= List of Pan American Games medalists in cycling =

This is the complete list of Pan American Games medalists in cycling from 1951 to 2015.

== Road cycling ==
=== Road race - Men's ===
Games	Gold	Silver	Bronze
1951 Buenos Aires	Oscar Muleiro; Argentina	Oscar Pezoa; Argentina	Humberto Varisco; Argentina
1955 Mexico City	Ramón Hoyos; Colombia	Benjamín Jiménez; Colombia	Alberto Velázquez; Uruguay
1959 Chicago	Ricardo Senn; Argentina	Francisco Lozano; Mexico	René Deceja; Uruguay
1963 São Paulo	Gregorio Carrizalez; Venezuela	Wilde Baridón; Uruguay	Delmo Delmastro; Argentina
1967 Winnipeg	Marcel Roy; Canada	Vicente Chancay; Argentina	Heriberto Díaz; Mexico
1971 Cali	John Howard; United States	Luiz Carlos Flores; Brazil	José Jaime Galeano; Colombia
1975 Mexico City	Gregorio Aldo Arencibia; Cuba	Alfonso Flores; Colombia	Carlos Cardet; Cuba
1979 San Juan	Carlos Cardet; Cuba	Bernardo Colex; Mexico	Gonzalo Marín; Colombia
1983 Caracas	Luis Rosendo Ramos; Mexico	Carlos Jaramillo; Colombia	Gustavo Parra; Venezuela
1987 Indianapolis	Luis Rosendo Ramos; Mexico	Marcos Mazzaron; Brazil	Enrique Campos; Venezuela
1991 Havana	Robinson Merchán; Venezuela	Heriberto Rodríguez; Cuba	Wanderley Magalhães Azevedo; Brazil
1995 Mar de Plata	Brian Walton; Canada	Mariano Friedick; United States	Fred Rodriguez; United States
1999 Winnipeg	Brian Walton; Canada	Gordon Fraser; Canada	Pedro Pablo Pérez; Cuba
2003 Santo Domingo	Milton Wynants; Uruguay	Pedro Pablo Pérez; Cuba	José Medina; Chile
2007 Rio de Janeiro	Wendy Cruz; Dominican Republic	Emile Abraham; Trinidad and Tobago	Luciano Pagliarini; Brazil
2011 Guadalajara	Marc de Maar; Netherlands Antilles	Miguel Ubeto; Venezuela	Arnold Alcolea; Cuba
2015 Toronto	Miguel Ubeto; Venezuela	Eric Marcotte; United States	Guillaume Boivin; Canada

=== Road race - Women's ===
The individual road race has been run every time since 1987.

Games	Gold	Silver	Bronze
1987 Indianapolis	Rebecca Twigg; United States	Inga Thompson-Benedict; United States	Sara Neil; Canada
1991 Havana	Jeanne Golay; United States	Odalys Toms; Cuba	Janice Bolland; United States
1995 Mar de Plata	Jeanne Golay; United States	Clara Hughes; Canada	Yacel Ojeda; Cuba
1999 Winnipeg	Karen Dunne; United States	Yoanka González; Cuba	Janildes Fernandes; Brazil
2003 Santo Domingo	Yoanka González; Cuba	Janildes Fernandes; Brazil	Yeilien Fernández; Cuba
2007 Rio de Janeiro	Yumari González; Cuba	Belem Guerrero; Mexico	Danielys García; Venezuela
2011 Guadalajara	Arlenis Sierra; Cuba	Yumari González; Cuba	Yudelmis Domínguez; Cuba
2015 Toronto	Jasmin Glaesser; Canada	Marlies Mejías; Cuba	Allison Beveridge; Canada

=== Team race - Men's ===
Games	Gold	Silver	Bronze
1951 Buenos Aires	Argentina	Mexico	Peru
1955 Mexico City	Colombia	Uruguay	Mexico
1959 Chicago	Argentina	Mexico	Uruguay
1963 São Paulo	Uruguay	United States	Venezuela

=== Time trial - Men's ===
Games	Gold	Silver	Bronze
1951 Buenos Aires	Oscar Giacché (ARG)	Héctor Rojas (CHI)	Rodolfo Caccavo (ARG)
1995 Mar del Plata	Clay Moseley; United States	Jesús Zárate; Mexico	Servando Figueredo; Uruguay
1999 Winnipeg	Eric Wohlberg; Canada	Levi Leipheimer; United States	Márcio May; Brazil
2003 Santo Domingo	José Serpa; Colombia	Chris Baldwin; United States	Franklin Chacón; Venezuela
2007 Rio de Janeiro	Santiago Botero; Colombia	Matías Médici; Argentina	Dominique Rollin; Canada
2011 Guadalajara	Marlon Pérez Arango; Colombia	Matías Médici; Argentina	Carlos Oyarzun; Chile
2015 Toronto	Hugo Houle; Canada	Ignacio Prado; Mexico	Sean MacKinnon; Canada

=== Time trial - Women's ===
The individual time trial was introduced in 1995, and has been run ever since.

Games	Gold	Silver	Bronze
1995 Mar de Plata	Dede Barry; United States	Yacel Ojeda; Cuba	Clara Hughes; Canada
1999 Winnipeg	Elizabeth Emery; United States	Lyne Bessette; Canada	Mari Holden; United States
2003 Santo Domingo	Kimberly Bruckner; United States	Clara Hughes; Canada	Kristin Armstrong; United States
2007 Rio de Janeiro	Anne Samplonius; Canada	Giuseppina Grassi; Mexico	Clemilda Fernandes; Brazil
2011 Guadalajara	María Luisa Calle; Colombia	Evelyn García; El Salvador	Laura Brown; Canada
2015 Toronto	Kelly Catlin; United States	Jasmin Glaesser; Canada	Evelyn García; El Salvador

=== Team time trial - Men's ===
Games	Gold	Silver	Bronze
1967 Winnipeg	Argentina; Delmo Delmastro; Carlos Miguel Álvarez	Mexico; Agustín Alcántara; Radamés Treviño; Roberto Brito; Adolfo Belmonte	Colombia
1971 Cali	Cuba; Galio Albolo; Gregorio Aldo Arencibia; Roberto Menéndez; Pedro Rodríguez	Colombia	Argentina
1975 Mexico City	Mexico; Ceferino Estrada; José Castañeda; Rodolfo Vitela	Cuba; Gregorio Aldo Arencibia; Carlos Cardet; José Prieto; Roberto Menéndez	Colombia
1979 San Juan	United States; Wayne Stetina; Andrew Weaver	Cuba	Canada
1983 Caracas	United States; Andrew Weaver; Davis Phinney; Thurlow Rogers	Cuba	Venezuela; Fernando Correa; Justo Galaviz; Mario Medina
1987 Indianapolis	United States; Kent Bostick; John Frey; Steve Hegg; Andy Paulin	Cuba	Mexico; Félipe Enríquez; Gabriel Cano
1991 Havana	Colombia; Héctor Palacio; Ruber Marín	Cuba	United States

=== Team time trial - Women's ===
Games	Gold	Silver	Bronze
1991 Havana	United States	Cuba	Canada

== Track cycling ==
=== Sprint - Men's ===
Games	Gold	Silver	Bronze
1951 Buenos Aires	Antonio Jiménez (ARG)	Carlos Martínez (ARG)	Mario Massanes (CHI)
1955 Mexico City	Jorge Bátiz (ARG)	Juan Pérez (URU)	Cenobio Ruiz (MEX)
1959 Chicago	Juan Canto (ARG)	Jack Disney (USA)	Carlos Alberto Vázquez (ARG)
1963 São Paulo	Roger Gibbon (TRI)	James Rossi (USA)	Edgardo Molinaroli (ARG)
1967 Winnipeg	Roger Gibbon (TRI)	Oscar García (ARG)	Carl Leusenkamp (USA)
1971 Cali	Leslie King (TRI)	Daniel Larreal (VEN)	Víctor Limba (ARG)
1975 Mexico City	Steven Woznick (USA)	Ottavio Dazzan (ARG)	Carl Leusenkamp (USA)
1979 San Juan	Gordon Singleton (CAN)	Jesús Pérez (CUB)	Dagoberto Pino (CUB)
1983 Caracas	Nelson Vails (USA)	Les Barczewski (USA)	José Antonio Urquijo (CHI)
1987 Indianapolis	Ken Carpenter (USA)	Mark Gorski (USA)	Curt Harnett (CAN)
1991 Havana	Richard Young (CAN)	D. Hiram (CUB)	Jhon González (COL)
1995 Mar de Plata	Marty Nothstein; United States	Christian Arrue; Chile	Gil Cordovés; Cuba
1999 Winnipeg	Marty Nothstein; United States	Christian Arrue; United States	Julio César Herrera; Cuba
2003 Santo Domingo	Leonardo Narváez; Colombia	Giddeon Massie; United States	None awarded
2007 Rio de Janeiro	Julio César Herrera; Cuba	Ben Barczewski; United States	Andy Lakatosh; United States
2011 Guadalajara	Hersony Canelón; Venezuela	Fabián Puerta; Colombia	Njisane Phillip; Trinidad and Tobago
2015 Toronto	Hugo Barrette; Canada	Njisane Phillip; Trinidad and Tobago	Hersony Canelón; Venezuela

=== Sprint - Women's ===
Games	Gold	Silver	Bronze
1987 Indianapolis	Connie Paraskevin-Young (USA)	Renee Duprel (USA)	Olga Ruyol (CUB)
1991 Havana	Tanya Dubnicoff (CAN)	Julie Gregg (USA)	Jessica Grieco (USA)
1995 Mar de Plata	Tanya Dubnicoff; Canada	Connie Paraskevin; United States	Nancy Contreras; Mexico
1999 Winnipeg	Tanya Dubnicoff; Canada	Jennie Reed; United States	Yumari González; Cuba
2003 Santo Domingo	Tanya Lindenmuth; United States	Daniela Larreal; Venezuela	Chris Witty; United States
2007 Rio de Janeiro	Diana García; Colombia	Lisandra Guerra; Cuba	Arianna Herrera; Cuba
2011 Guadalajara	Lisandra Guerra; Cuba	Daniela Larreal; Venezuela	Diana García; Colombia
2015 Toronto	Monique Sullivan; Canada	Kate O'Brien; Canada	Juliana Gaviria; Colombia

=== Team sprint - Men's ===
Games	Gold	Silver	Bronze
2003 Santo Domingo	Cuba; Ahmed López; Reinier Cartaya; Yosmani Poll	Colombia; Rodrigo Barros; Jonathan Marín; Leonardo Narváez	Venezuela; Alexander Cornieles; Rubén Osorio; Jhonny Hernández
2007 Rio de Janeiro	Cuba; Ahmed López; Julio César Herrera; Yosmani Poll	Venezuela; Hersony Canelón; Andris Hernández; César Marcano	Colombia; Leonardo Narváez; Hernán Sánchez; Marzuki Mejia
2011 Guadalajara	Venezuela; Hersony Canelón; César Marcano; Ángel Pulgar	United States; Michael Blatchford; Dean Tracy; Jimmy Watkins	Colombia; Jonathan Marín; Fabián Puerta; Christian Tamayo
2015 Toronto	Canada; Hugo Barrette; Evan Carey; Joseph Veloce	Venezuela; Hersony Canelón; César Marcano; Ángel Pulgar	Brazil; Flávio Cipriano; Kacio Fonseca; Hugo Osteti

=== Team sprint - Women's ===
Games	Gold	Silver	Bronze
2011 Guadalajara	Venezuela; Daniela Larreal; Mariaesthela Vilera	Colombia; Diana García; Juliana Gaviria	Mexico; Nancy Contreras; Daniela Gaxiola
2015 Toronto	Canada; Kate O'Brien; Monique Sullivan	Cuba; Lisandra Guerra; Marlies Mejías	Colombia; Diana García; Juliana Gaviria

=== Time trial - Men's ===
Games	Gold	Silver	Bronze
1951 Buenos Aires	Clodomiro Cortoni; Argentina	Hernán Masanés; Chile	Jorge Sobrevila; Argentina
1955 Mexico City	Antonio di Micheli; Venezuela	Octavio Echeverry; Colombia	Luis Serra; Uruguay
1959 Chicago	Anésio Argenton; Brazil	David Staub; United States	Ricardo Senn; Argentina
1963 São Paulo	Carlos Alberto Vázquez; Argentina	Roger Gibbon; Trinidad and Tobago	Anésio Argenton; Brazil
1967 Winnipeg	Roger Gibbon; Trinidad and Tobago	Jackie Simes; United States	Carlos Alberto Vázquez; Argentina
1971 Cali	Jocelyn Lovell; Canada	Leslie King; Trinidad and Tobago	Harold Halsey; United States
1975 Mexico City	Jocelyn Lovell; Canada	David Weller; Jamaica	Steven Woznick; United States
1979 San Juan	Gordon Singleton; Canada	David Weller; Jamaica	Richard Tormen; Chile
1983 Caracas	Rory O'Reilly; United States	Marcelo Alexandre; Argentina	David Weller; Jamaica
1987 Indianapolis	Curt Harnett; Canada	Gene Samuel; Trinidad and Tobago	Leonard Nitz; United States
1991 Havana	Gene Samuel; Trinidad and Tobago	Erin Hartwell; United States	Germán García; Argentina
1995 Mar de Plata	Gil Cordovés; Cuba	Erin Hartwell; United States	Gene Samuel; Trinidad and Tobago
1999 Winnipeg	Julio César Herrera; Cuba	Erin Hartwell; United States	Doug Baron; Canada
2003 Santo Domingo	Ahmed López; Cuba	Christian Stahl; United States	Benjamín Martínez; Bolivia

=== Time trial - Women's ===
Games	Gold	Silver	Bronze
1999 Winnipeg	Tanya Dubnicoff; Canada	Nancy Contreras; Mexico	Yumari González; Cuba
2003 Santo Domingo	Nancy Contreras; Mexico	Chris Witty; United States	Yumari González; Cuba

=== Australian pursuit - Men's ===
Games	Gold	Silver	Bronze
1951 Buenos Aires	Exequiel Ramírez (CHI)	Alfredo Hersch (ARG)	Elvio Giacche (ARG)

=== Individual pursuit - Men's ===
Games	Gold	Silver	Bronze
1951 Buenos Aires	Jorge Vallmitjana (ARG)	Pedro Salas (ARG)	Hernán Llerena (PER)
1967 Winnipeg	Martín Emilio Rodríguez (COL)	Juan Alberto Merlos (ARG)	Radamés Treviño (MEX)
1971 Cali	Martín Emilio Rodríguez (COL)	Juan Alberto Merlos (ARG)	Francisco Huerta (MEX)
1975 Mexico City	Balbino Jaramillo (COL)	Francisco Huerta (MEX)	Fernando Vera (CHI)
1979 San Juan	Claude Langlois (CAN)	Fernando Vera (CHI)	Juan Rivera (CUB)
1983 Caracas	David Grylls (USA)	José Ruiz (VEN)	Gabriel Curuchet (ARG)
1987 Indianapolis	Gabriel Curuchet (ARG)	David Brinton (USA)	Patrick Beauchemin (CAN)
1991 Havana	Raúl Domínguez (CUB)	Dirk Copeland (USA)	Miguel Droguett (CHI)
1995 Mar de Plata	Kent Bostick; United States	Walter Pérez; Argentina	Brian Walton; Canada
1999 Winnipeg	Dylan Casey; United States	Walter Pérez; Argentina	Marlon Pérez Arango; Colombia
2003 Santo Domingo	Edgardo Simón; Argentina	Marco Arriagada; Chile	Alexander González; Colombia
2007 Rio de Janeiro	Enzo Cesario; Chile	Tomás Gil; Venezuela	Fernando Antogna; Argentina

=== Individual pursuit - Women's ===
Games	Gold	Silver	Bronze
1987 Indianapolis	Rebecca Twigg (USA)	Kelly-Ann Way (CAN)	Enedilma Poveda (CUB)
1991 Havana	Kendra Kneeland (USA)	Clara Hughes (CAN)	Tatiana Fernández (CUB)
1995 Mar de Plata	Jane Eickhoff; United States	Yoanka González Pérez; Cuba	Belem Guerrero Méndez; Mexico
1999 Winnipeg	Erin Veenstra; United States	María Luisa Calle; Colombia	Yoanka González; Cuba
2003 Santo Domingo	María Luisa Calle; Colombia	Yoanka González; Cuba	Clara Hughes; Canada
2007 Rio de Janeiro	María Luisa Calle; Colombia	Danielys García; Venezuela	Dalila Rodríguez Hernandez; Cuba

=== Team pursuit - Men's ===
Games	Gold	Silver	Bronze
1951 Buenos Aires	Argentina; Rodolfo Caccavo; Pedro Salas; Oscar Giacché; Alberto García	Chile	Venezuela; Andoni Ituarte; Luis Toro
1955 Mexico City	Argentina; Clodomiro Cortoni; Ricardo Senn; Duilio Biganzoli; Alberto Ferreyra	Uruguay; Alberto Velázquez; Luis Serra; Julio Sobrera	Mexico; Rubén Ramírez; Francisco Lozano; Viviano Gonzalez
1959 Chicago	United States; Charles Hewett; James Rossi; Richard Cortright; Robert Pfarr	Uruguay; Eduardo Puertollano; Héctor Placeres; Rodolfo Rodino; Juan José Timón	Argentina; Federico Cortés; Antonio Alexandre; Héctor Acosta; Ricardo Senn
1963 São Paulo	Uruguay; Alberto Velázquez; Juan José Timón; Rubén Etchebarne; Luis Serra	Argentina; Héctor Acosta; Juan Brotto; Alberto Trillo; Ernesto Contreras	Mexico; Melesio Soto; Mauricio Mata; Jacinto Brito; Enrique Barajas
1967 Winnipeg	Argentina	Mexico	United States; William Kund; Skip Cutting; Wes Chowen
1971 Cali	Colombia	Argentina; José Pittaro; Raúl Halket	United States; David Mulica; John Vande Velde; David Chauner
1975 Mexico City	United States; Paul Deem; Ralph Therrio; Ron Skarin	Colombia	Mexico; Francisco Vázquez; Rubén Camacho
1979 San Juan	Chile; Fernando Vera; Roberto Muñoz; Richard Tormen; Sérgio Aliste	Cuba; Juan Rivera; Cabrera; Antonio Madera; Raúl Marcelo Vázquez	Argentina; Carlos Miguel Álvarez; Pedro Caino; Juan Carlos Haedo; Eduardo Trillini
1983 Caracas	United States; David Grylls; Brent Emery; Leonard Nitz	Cuba	Brazil; Mauro Ribeiro; Fernando Louro
1987 Indianapolis	United States; Leonard Nitz; Carl Sundquist; Dave Lettieri; David Brinton	Argentina; Rubén Priede; Sergio Llamazares	Brazil; Antônio Silvestre; Paulo Jamur; Fernando Louro
1991 Havana	Cuba; Noël de la Cruz; Eugenio Castro	United States; Chris Coletta; Jim Pollak; Matt Hamon	Argentina; Fabio Placanica; Gustavo Guglielmone
1995 Mar de Plata	United States	Cuba	Brazil; Mauro Ribeiro; Hernandes Quadri Júnior; Jamil Suaiden
1999 Winnipeg	USA; Derek Bouchard-Hall; Mariano Friedick; Adam Laurent; Tommy Mulkey	CUB	ARG; Gonzalo García; Juan Guillermo Brunetta; Gustavo Artacho
2003 Santo Domingo	Chile; Enzo Cesario; Marco Arriagada; Luis Sepúlveda; Antonio Cabrera	Argentina; Ángel Colla; Juan Guillermo Brunetta; Walter Pérez; Edgardo Simón	Colombia; Alexander González; José Serpa; Arles Castro; Juan Pablo Forero
2007 Rio de Janeiro	Chile; Enzo Cesario; Marco Arriagada; Luis Sepúlveda; Gonzalo Miranda	Colombia; Carlos Alzate; Juan Pablo Forero; Arles Castro; Jairo Pérez	Venezuela; Tomás Gil; Richard Ochoa; Jaime Rivas; Franklin Chacón
2011 Guadalajara	Colombia; Juan Arango; Edwin Ávila; Arles Castro; Weimar Roldán	Chile; Antonio Cabrera; Gonzalo Miranda; Pablo Seisdedos; Luis Sepúlveda	Argentina; Maximiliano Almada; Marcos Crespo; Walter Pérez; Eduardo Sepúlveda
2015 Toronto	Colombia; Juan Arango; Arles Castro; Fernando Gaviria; Jhonatan Restrepo	Argentina; Mauro Agostini; Maximiliano Richeze; Walter Pérez; Adrián Richeze; Juan Alberto Merlos	Canada; Eric Johnstone; Sean MacKinnon; Rémi Pelletier-Roy; Ed Veal; Adam Jamieson

=== Team pursuit - Women's ===
Games	Gold	Silver	Bronze
2011 Guadalajara	Canada; Laura Brown; Jasmin Glaesser; Stephanie Roorda	Cuba; Yumari González; Dalila Rodríguez Hernandez; Yudelmis Domínguez	Colombia; María Luisa Calle; Sérika Gulumá; Lorena Vargas
2015 Toronto	Canada; Allison Beveridge; Laura Brown; Jasmin Glaesser; Kirsti Lay	United States; Jennifer Valente; Sarah Hammer; Kelly Catlin; Lauren Tamayo; Ruth Winder	Mexico; Sofía Arreola; Íngrid Drexel; Mayra Rocha; Lizbeth Salazar

=== Points race - Men's ===
Games	Gold	Silver	Bronze
1983 Caracas	John Beckman (USA)	Juan Curuchet (ARG)	Peter Aldridge (JAM)
1987 Indianapolis	Federico Moreira (URU)	José Youshimatz (MEX)	Conrado Cabrera (CUB)
1991 Havana	Erminio Suárez (ARG)	Jairo Giraldo (COL)	Conrado Cabrera (CUB)
1995 Mar de Plata	Brian Walton; Canada	Milton Wynants; Uruguay	Juan Merheb; Puerto Rico
1999 Winnipeg	Marlon Pérez Arango; Colombia	Luis Martínez; Mexico	Milton Wynants; Uruguay
2003 Santo Domingo	Milton Wynants; Uruguay	Marco Arriagada; Chile	Leonardo Duque; Colombia
2007 Rio de Janeiro	Andris Hernández; Venezuela	José Serpa; Colombia	Milton Wynants; Uruguay

=== Points race - Women's ===
Games	Gold	Silver	Bronze
1995 Mar de Plata	Jane Eickhoff; United States	Belem Guerrero; Mexico	Dania Pérez; Cuba
1999 Winnipeg	Erin Veenstra; United States	Belem Guerrero; Mexico	María Luisa Calle; Colombia
2003 Santo Domingo	Clara Hughes; Canada	María Dolores Molina; Guatemala	Yoanka González; Cuba
2007 Rio de Janeiro	Yoanka González; Cuba	María Luisa Calle; Colombia	Belem Guerrero; Mexico

=== Madison - Men's ===
Games	Gold	Silver	Bronze
1999 Winnipeg	Argentina; Gabriel Curuchet; Juan Curuchet	United States; James Carney; Brian Whitcomb	Chile; Richard Rodríguez; Luis Fernando Sepúlveda
2003 Santo Domingo	Argentina; Walter Pérez; Juan Curuchet	Colombia; Alexander González; Leonardo Duque	United States; Colby Pearce; James Carney
2007 Rio de Janeiro	Argentina; Walter Pérez; Juan Curuchet	Colombia; Alexander González; José Serpa	Venezuela; Richard Ochoa; Andris Hernández
2019 Lima	Chile; Antonio Cabrera; Felipe Peñaloza	United States; Gavin Hoover; Adrian Hegyvary	Colombia; Juan Esteban Arango; Brayan Sánchez
2023 Santiago	Mexico; Fernando Nava; Ricardo Peña	Colombia; Juan Esteban Arango; Jordan Parra	United States; Colby Lange; Grant Koontz

=== Madison - Women's ===
Games	Gold	Silver	Bronze
2019 Lima	United States; Kimberly Geist; Christina Birch	Canada; Miriam Brouwer; Maggie Coles-Lyster	Mexico; Lizbeth Salazar; Jessica Bonilla
2023 Santiago	Colombia; Lina Hernández; Lina Rojas	Mexico; Lizbeth Salazar; Antonieta Gaxiola	United States; Chloe Patrick; Colleen Gulick

=== Olympic sprint - Men's ===
Games	Gold	Silver	Bronze
1999 Winnipeg	Christian Arrue; United States; Johnny Barios; United States; Marty Nothstein; United States	Joel Gelabert; Cuba; Yosmani Rodríguez; Cuba; Julio César Herrera; Cuba	Sebastián Alexandre; Argentina; Marcelo Ammendolia; Argentina; Juan José Haedo; Argentina

=== Keirin - Men's ===
The individual road race has been run every time since 1999.

Games	Gold	Silver	Bronze
1999 Winnipeg	Marty Nothstein; United States	Jhon González; Colombia	Mario Joseph; Trinidad and Tobago
2003 Santo Domingo	Giddeon Massie; United States	Rubén Osorio; Venezuela	José Alberto Sochón; Guatemala
2007 Rio de Janeiro	Leonardo Narváez; Colombia	Cam Mackinnon; Canada	Leandro Bottasso; Argentina
2011 Guadalajara	Fabián Puerta; Colombia	Hersony Canelón; Venezuela	Leandro Bottasso; Argentina
2015 Toronto	Fabián Puerta; Colombia	Hersony Canelón; Venezuela	Hugo Barrette; Canada

=== Keirin - Women's ===
The individual road race has been run every time since 2003.

Games	Gold	Silver	Bronze
2003 Santo Domingo	Tanya Lindenmuth; United States	Daniela Larreal; Venezuela	Yumari González; Cuba
2011 Guadalajara	Daniela Larreal; Venezuela	Daniela Gaxiola; Mexico	Dana Feiss; United States
2015 Toronto	Monique Sullivan; Canada	Lisandra Guerra; Cuba	Juliana Gaviria; Colombia

=== Omnium - Men's ===
The individual road race has been run every time since 2011.

Games	Gold	Silver	Bronze
2011 Guadalajara	Juan Arango; Colombia	Luis Mansilla; Chile	Walter Pérez; Argentina
2015 Toronto	Fernando Gaviria; Colombia	Ignacio Prado; Mexico	Gideoni Monteiro; Brazil

=== Omnium - Women's ===
The individual road race has been run every time since 2011.

Games	Gold	Silver	Bronze
2011 Guadalajara	Angie González; Venezuela	Sofía Arreola; Mexico	Marlies Mejías; Cuba
2015 Toronto	Sarah Hammer; United States	Jasmin Glaesser; Canada	Marlies Mejías; Cuba

== Mountain biking ==
=== Men's ===
Games	Gold	Silver	Bronze
1995 Mar de Plata	Tinker Juarez; United States	Andrés Brenes; Costa Rica	Sandro Miranda; Argentina
1999 Winnipeg	Edward Larsen; United States	Carl Swenson; United States	Christopher Sheppard; Canada
2003 Santo Domingo	Jeremiah Bishop; United States	Edvandro Cruz; Brazil	Deiber Esquivel; Costa Rica
2007 Rio de Janeiro	Adam Craig; United States	Rubens Donizete; Brazil	Dario Alejandro Gasco; Argentina
2011 Guadalajara	Hector Páez; Colombia	Max Plaxton; Canada	Jeremiah Bishop; United States
2015 Toronto	Raphaël Gagné; Canada	Catriel Soto; Argentina	Stephen Ettinger; United States

=== Women's ===
Games	Gold	Silver	Bronze
1995 Mar de Plata	Alison Sydor; Canada	Juli Furtado; United States	Jimena Florit; Argentina
1999 Winnipeg	Alison Dunlap; United States	Alison Sydor; Canada	Jimena Florit; Argentina
2003 Santo Domingo	Jimena Florit; Argentina	Mary McConneloug; United States	Francisca Campos; Chile
2007 Rio de Janeiro	Catharine Pendrel; Canada	Mary McConneloug; United States	Lorenza Morfín; Mexico
2011 Guadalajara	Heather Irmiger; United States	Lorenza Morfín; Mexico	Amanda Sin; Canada
2015 Toronto	Emily Batty; Canada	Catharine Pendrel; Canada	Erin Huck; United States

== BMX ==
=== Men's ===
The BMX was introduced in 2007.

Games	Gold	Silver	Bronze
2007 Rio de Janeiro	Jason Richardson; United States	Jonathan Suárez; Venezuela	José Primera; Venezuela
2011 Guadalajara	Connor Fields; United States	Nicholas Long; United States	Andrés Jiménez; Colombia
2015 Toronto	Tory Nyhaug; Canada	Alfredo Campo; Ecuador	Nicholas Long; United States

=== Women's ===
The BMX was introduced in 2007.

Games	Gold	Silver	Bronze
2007 Rio de Janeiro	Gabriela Díaz; Argentina	Ana Flávia Sgobin; Brazil	Kimmy Diquez; Venezuela
2011 Guadalajara	Mariana Pajón; Colombia	Arielle Martin; United States	Gabriela Díaz; Argentina
2015 Toronto	Felicia Stancil; United States	Doménica Azuero; Ecuador	Mariana Díaz; Argentina
