= Cycling at the Pan American Games =

- No. of events: 22 (men: 11; women: 11)

Cycling has been contested at the Pan American Games since the inaugural games in, 1951, without ever leaving the program.

The next edition of the games will take place in 2027 in Barranquilla, Colombia. In 2019, 22 medal events were contested, four in BMX, two in mountain biking, four in road cycling, and 12 in track cycling. A total of 250 cyclists qualified to compete at those games.

In 2016, the International Olympic Committee (IOC) made several changes to its sports program, which were subsequently implemented for these games. Included in this was the addition of BMX freestyle events for the first time to the Pan American Games sports program. Also added was the addition of the Madison event in track cycling event for men and women.

== Current events ==
=== Road cycling ===
==== Men's road race ====
The individual road race has been run every time since 1951.

Games	Gold	Silver	Bronze
Buenos Aires 1951	Oscar Muleiro; Argentina	Oscar Pezoa; Argentina	Humberto Varisco; Argentina
Mexico City 1955	Ramón Hoyos; Colombia	Benjamín Jiménez; Colombia	Alberto Velázquez; Uruguay
Chicago 1959	Ricardo Senn; Argentina	Francisco Lozano; Mexico	René Deceja; Uruguay
São Paulo 1963	Gregorio Carrizalez; Venezuela	Wilde Baridon; Uruguay	Delmo Delmastro; Argentina
Winnipeg 1967	Marcel Roy; Canada	Vicente Chancay; Argentina	Heriberto Díaz; Mexico
Cali 1971	John Howard; United States	Luis Carlos Flores; Brazil	José Jaime Galeano; Colombia
Mexico City 1975	Aldo Arencibia; Cuba	Alfonso Flores; Colombia	Carlos Cardet; Cuba
San Juan 1979	Carlos Cardet; Cuba	Bernardo Colex; Mexico	Gonzalo Marín; Colombia
Caracas 1983	Luis Rosendo Ramos; Mexico	Carlos Jaramillo; Colombia	Gustavo Parra; Venezuela
Indianapolis 1987	Luis Rosendo Ramos; Mexico	Marcos Mazzaron; Brazil	Enrique Campos; Venezuela
Havana 1991	Robinson Merchán; Venezuela	Heriberto Rodríguez; Cuba	Wanderley Magalhães; Brazil
Mar de Plata 1995	Brian Walton; Canada	Mariano Friedick; United States	Fred Rodriguez; United States
Winnipeg 1999	Brian Walton; Canada	Gordon Fraser; Canada	Pedro Pablo Pérez; Cuba
Santo Domingo 2003	Milton Wynants; Uruguay	Pedro Pablo Pérez; Cuba	José Medina; Chile
Rio de Janeiro 2007	Wendy Cruz; Dominican Republic	Emile Abraham; Trinidad and Tobago	Luciano Pagliarini; Brazil
Guadalajara 2011	Marc de Maar; Netherlands Antilles	Miguel Ubeto; Venezuela	Arnold Alcolea; Cuba
Toronto 2015	Miguel Ubeto; Venezuela	Eric Marcotte; United States	Guillaume Boivin; Canada
Lima 2019	Maximiliano Richeze; Argentina	Ignacio Prado; Mexico	Bryan Gómez; Colombia
Santiago 2023	Jhonatan Narváez; Ecuador	Eduardo Sepúlveda; Argentina	Eric Fagúndez; Uruguay

==== Women's road race ====
The individual road race has been run every time since 1987.

Games	Gold	Silver	Bronze
Indianapolis 1987	Rebecca Twigg; United States	Inga Thompson-Benedict; United States	Sara Neil; Canada
Havana 1991	Jeanne Golay; United States	Odalys Toms; Cuba	Janice Bolland; United States
Mar de Plata 1995	Jeanne Golay; United States	Clara Hughes; Canada	Yacel Ojeda; Cuba
Winnipeg 1999	Karen Dunne; United States	Yoanka González; Cuba	Janildes Fernandes; Brazil
Santo Domingo 2003	Yoanka González; Cuba	Janildes Fernandes; Brazil	Yeilien Fernández; Cuba
Rio de Janeiro 2007	Yumari González; Cuba	Belem Guerrero; Mexico	Danielys García; Venezuela
Guadalajara 2011	Arlenis Sierra; Cuba	Yumari González; Cuba	Yudelmis Domínguez; Cuba
Toronto 2015	Jasmin Glaesser; Canada	Marlies Mejías; Cuba	Allison Beveridge; Canada
Lima 2019	Arlenis Sierra; Cuba	Teniel Campbell; Trinidad and Tobago	Lizbeth Salazar; Mexico
Santiago 2023	Lauren Stephens; United States	Miryam Núñez; Ecuador	Agua Marina Espínola; Paraguay

==== Men's time trial ====
The men's individual time trial has been run at every Games since 1951.

Games	Gold	Silver	Bronze
Buenos Aires 1951	Clodomiro Cortoni; Argentina	Hernán Messanes; Chile	Jorge Sobrevila; Argentina
Mexico City 1955	Antonio di Micheli; Venezuela	Octavio Echeverri; Colombia	Luis Serra; Uruguay
Chicago 1959	Anésio Argenton; Brazil	David Staub; United States	Ricardo Senn; Argentina
São Paulo 1963	Carlos Vásquez; Argentina	Roger Gibbon; Trinidad and Tobago	Anésio Argenton; Brazil
Winnipeg 1967	Roger Gibbon; Trinidad and Tobago	Jack Simes; United States	Carlos Vásquez; Argentina
Cali 1971	Jocelyn Lovell; Canada	Leslie King; Trinidad and Tobago	Harold Halsey; United States
Mexico City 1975	Jocelyn Lovell; Canada	David Weller; Jamaica	Steve Woznick; United States
San Juan 1979	Gordon Singleton; Canada	David Weller; Jamaica	Richard Thormen; Chile
Caracas 1983	Rory O'Reilly; United States	Marcelo Alexandre; Argentina	David Weller; Jamaica
Indianapolis 1987	Curtis Harnett; Canada	Gene Samuel; Trinidad and Tobago	Leonard Nitz; United States
Havana 1991	Gene Samuel; Trinidad and Tobago	Erin Hartwell; United States	Germán García; Argentina
Mar de Plata 1995	Gil Cordovés; Cuba	Erin Hartwell; United States	Gene Samuel; Trinidad and Tobago
Winnipeg 1999	Eric Wohlberg; Canada	Levi Leipheimer; United States	Márcio May; Brazil
Santo Domingo 2003	José Serpa; Colombia	Chris Baldwin; United States	Franklin Chacón; Venezuela
Rio de Janeiro 2007	Santiago Botero; Colombia	Matías Médici; Argentina	Dominique Rollin; Canada
Guadalajara 2011	Marlon Pérez; Colombia	Matías Médici; Argentina	Carlos Oyarzún; Chile
Toronto 2015	Hugo Houle; Canada	Ignacio Prado; Mexico	Sean MacKinnon; Canada
Lima 2019	Daniel Martínez; Colombia	Magno Nazaret; Brazil	José Rodríguez; Chile
Santiago 2023	Walter Vargas; Colombia	Richard Carapaz; Ecuador	Conor White; Bermuda

==== Women's time trial ====
The women's individual time trial was introduced at the 1995 Games, and has been run ever since.

Games	Gold	Silver	Bronze
Mar de Plata 1995	Dede Barry; United States	Yacel Ojeda; Cuba	Clara Hughes; Canada
Winnipeg 1999	Elizabeth Emery; United States	Lyne Bessette; Canada	Mari Holden; United States
Santo Domingo 2003	Kimberly Bruckner; United States	Clara Hughes; Canada	Kristin Armstrong; United States
Rio de Janeiro 2007	Anne Samplonius; Canada	Giuseppina Grassi; Mexico	Clemilda Fernandes; Brazil
Guadalajara 2011	María Luisa Calle; Colombia	Evelyn García; El Salvador	Laura Brown; Canada
Toronto 2015	Kelly Catlin; United States	Jasmin Glaesser; Canada	Evelyn García; El Salvador
Lima 2019	Chloé Dygert; United States	Teniel Campbell; Trinidad and Tobago	Laurie Jussaume; Canada
Santiago 2023	Kristen Faulkner; United States	Arlenis Sierra; Cuba	Aranza Villalón; Chile

=== Track cycling ===
==== Men's keirin ====
Games	Gold	Silver	Bronze
Winnipeg 1999	Marty Nothstein; United States	Jhon González; Colombia	Mario Joseph; Trinidad and Tobago
Santo Domingo 2003	Barry Forde; Barbados	Giddeon Massie; United States	Rubén Osorio; Venezuela
Rio de Janeiro 2007	Leonardo Narváez; Colombia	Cam Mackinnon; Canada	Leandro Bottasso; Argentina
Guadalajara 2011	Fabián Puerta; Colombia	Hersony Canelón; Venezuela	Leandro Bottasso; Argentina
Toronto 2015	Fabián Puerta; Colombia	Hersony Canelón; Venezuela	Hugo Barrette; Canada
Lima 2019	Kevin Quintero; Colombia	Hersony Canelón; Venezuela	Leandro Bottasso; Argentina
Santiago 2023	Kevin Quintero; Colombia	Nicholas Paul; Trinidad and Tobago	Juan Ruiz Terán; Mexico

==== Women's keirin ====
Games	Gold	Silver	Bronze
Santo Domingo 2003	Tanya Lindenmuth; United States	Daniela Larreal; Venezuela	Yumari González; Cuba
Guadalajara 2011	Daniela Larreal; Venezuela	Luz Daniela Gaxiola; Mexico	Dana Feiss; United States
Toronto 2015	Monique Sullivan; Canada	Lisandra Guerra; Cuba	Juliana Gaviria; Colombia
Lima 2019	Martha Bayona; Colombia	Lisandra Guerra; Cuba	Yuli Verdugo; Mexico
Santiago 2023	Martha Bayona; Colombia	Daniela Gaxiola; Mexico	Dahlia Pamer; Jamaica

==== Men's omnium ====
Games	Gold	Silver	Bronze
Guadalajara 2011	Juan Esteban Arango; Colombia	Luis Mansilla; Chile	Walter Pérez; Argentina
Toronto 2015	Fernando Gaviria; Colombia	Ignacio Prado; Mexico	Gideoni Monteiro; Brazil
Lima 2019	Daniel Holloway; United States	Ignacio Prado; Mexico	Felipe Peñaloza; Chile
Santiago 2023	Hugo Ruiz; Peru	Ricardo Peña; Mexico	Jacob Decar; Chile

==== Women's omnium ====
Games	Gold	Silver	Bronze
Guadalajara 2011	Angie González; Venezuela	Sofía Arreola; Mexico	Marlies Mejías; Cuba
Toronto 2015	Sarah Hammer; United States	Jasmin Glaesser; Canada	Marlies Mejías; Cuba
Lima 2019	Jennifer Valente; United States	Lizbeth Salazar; Mexico	Arlenis Sierra; Cuba
Santiago 2023	Yareli Acevedo; Mexico	Lina Hernández; Colombia	Catalina Soto; Chile

=== Mountain biking ===
==== Men's cross-country ====
Cross-country mountain biking was introduced in 1995.

Games	Gold	Silver	Bronze
Mar de Plata 1995	Tinker Juarez; United States	Andrés Brenes; Costa Rica	Sandro Miranda; Argentina
Winnipeg 1999	Edward Larsen; United States	Carl Swenson; United States	Christopher Sheppard; Canada
Santo Domingo 2003	Jeremiah Bishop; United States	Edvandro Cruz; Brazil	Deiber Esquivel; Costa Rica
Rio de Janeiro 2007	Adam Craig; United States	Rubens Donizete; Brazil	Dario Alejandro Gasco; Argentina
Guadalajara 2011	Héctor Leonardo Páez; Colombia	Max Plaxton; Canada	Jeremiah Bishop; United States
Toronto 2015	Raphaël Gagné; Canada	Catriel Soto; Argentina	Stephen Ettinger; United States
Lima 2019	Gerardo Ulloa; Mexico	Henrique Avancini; Brazil	Martín Vidaurre; Chile
Santiago 2023	Gunnar Holmgren; Canada	Martín Vidaurre; Chile	José Gabriel Marques; Brazil

==== Women's cross-country ====
Cross-country mountain was introduced in 1995.

Games	Gold	Silver	Bronze
Mar de Plata 1995	Alison Sydor; Canada	Juli Furtado; United States	Jimena Florit; Argentina
Winnipeg 1999	Alison Dunlap; United States	Alison Sydor; Canada	Jimena Florit; Argentina
Santo Domingo 2003	Jimena Florit; Argentina	Mary McConneloug; United States	Francisca Campos; Chile
Rio de Janeiro 2007	Catharine Pendrel; Canada	Mary McConneloug; United States	Lorenza Morfín; Mexico
Guadalajara 2011	Heather Irmiger; United States	Lorenza Morfin; Mexico	Amanda Sin; Canada
Toronto 2015	Emily Batty; Canada	Catharine Pendrel; Canada	Erin Huck; United States
Lima 2019	Daniela Campuzano; Mexico	Sofía Gómez; Argentina	Jaqueline Mourão; Brazil
Santiago 2023	Jennifer Jackson; Canada	Catalina Vidaurre; Chile	Raiza Goulão; Brazil

=== BMX ===
==== Men's BMX racing ====
The BMX was introduced in 2007.

Games	Gold	Silver	Bronze
Rio de Janeiro 2007	Jason Richardson; United States	Jonathan Suárez; Venezuela	José Primera; Venezuela
Guadalajara 2011	Connor Fields; United States	Nicholas Long; United States	Andrés Jiménez; Colombia
Toronto 2015	Tory Nyhaug; Canada	Alfredo Campo; Ecuador	Nicholas Long; United States
Lima 2019	Alfredo Campo; Ecuador	Anderson de Souza; Brazil	Federico Villegas; Argentina
Santiago 2023	Kamren Larsen; United States	Cameron Wood; United States	Carlos Ramírez; Colombia

==== Women's BMX racing ====
The BMX was introduced in 2007.

Games	Gold	Silver	Bronze
Rio de Janeiro 2007	Gabriela Díaz; Argentina	Ana Flávia Sgobin; Brazil	Kimmy Diquez; Venezuela
Guadalajara 2011	Mariana Pajón; Colombia	Arielle Martin; United States	Gabriela Díaz; Argentina
Toronto 2015	Felicia Stancil; United States	Doménica Azuero; Ecuador	Mariana Díaz; Argentina
Lima 2019	Mariana Pajón; Colombia	Paola Reis; Brazil	Stefany Hernández; Venezuela
Santiago 2023	Mariana Pajón; Colombia	Molly Simpson; Canada	Gabriela Bolle; Colombia

=== BMX freestyle ===
==== Men's BMX freestyle ====
The BMX freestyle was introduced in 2019.

Games	Gold	Silver	Bronze
Lima 2019	Daniel Dhers; Venezuela	José Torres; Argentina	Justin Dowell; United States
Santiago 2023	José Torres; Argentina	José Manuel Cedano; Chile	Gustavo Oliveira; Brazil

==== Women's BMX freestyle ====
The BMX freestyle was introduced in 2019.

Games	Gold	Silver	Bronze
Lima 2019	Hannah Roberts; United States	Macarena Perez Grasset; Chile	Agustina Roth; Argentina
Santiago 2023	Hannah Roberts; United States	Macarena Perez Grasset; Chile	Katherine Díaz; Venezuela

== All-time medal table ==
=== Road cycling ===
Men's and women's events (1951–2023)
Rank	Nation	Gold	Silver	Bronze	Total
1	United States	17	9	7	33
2	Canada	10	5	10	25
3	Colombia	9	4	5	18
4	Argentina	8	6	7	21
5	Cuba	7	14	6	27
6	Mexico	3	9	4	16
7	Venezuela	3	1	6	10
8	Uruguay	2	2	5	9
9	Brazil	1	4	6	11
10	Ecuador	1	2	0	3
11	Dominican Republic	1	0	0	1
11	Netherlands Antilles	1	0	0	1
13	Trinidad and Tobago	0	3	0	3
14	Chile	0	1	4	5
15	El Salvador	0	1	1	2
16	Bermuda	0	0	1	1
16	Paraguay	0	0	1	1
16	Peru	0	0	1	1
Totals (18 entries)		63	61	64	188

=== Track cycling ===
Men's and women's events (1951–2023)
Rank	Nation	Gold	Silver	Bronze	Total
1	United States	31	26	17	74
2	Colombia	23	20	18	61
3	Canada	20	8	8	36
4	Argentina	14	15	14	43
5	Cuba	10	14	21	45
6	Trinidad and Tobago	8	6	3	17
7	Venezuela	7	11	6	24
8	Chile	6	8	10	24
9	Mexico	4	18	16	38
10	Uruguay	3	4	3	10
11	Peru	1	0	2	3
12	Jamaica	0	2	3	5
13	Guatemala	0	1	0	1
13	Suriname	0	1	0	1
15	Brazil	0	0	6	6
16	Bolivia	0	0	1	1
16	Puerto Rico	0	0	1	1
Totals (17 entries)		127	134	129	390

=== Mountain biking ===
Men's and women's events (1995–2023)
Rank	Nation	Gold	Silver	Bronze	Total
1	United States	6	4	3	13
2	Canada	6	3	2	11
3	Mexico	2	1	1	4
4	Argentina	1	2	4	7
5	Colombia	1	0	0	1
6	Brazil	0	3	3	6
7	Chile	0	2	2	4
8	Costa Rica	0	1	1	2
Totals (8 entries)		16	16	16	48

=== BMX racing ===
Men's and women's events (2007–2023)
Rank	Nation	Gold	Silver	Bronze	Total
1	United States	4	3	1	8
2	Colombia	3	0	3	6
3	Ecuador	1	2	0	3
4	Canada	1	1	0	2
5	Argentina	1	0	3	4
6	Brazil	0	3	0	3
7	Venezuela	0	1	3	4
Totals (7 entries)		10	10	10	30

=== BMX freestyle ===
Men's and women's events (2019–2023)
Rank	Nation	Gold	Silver	Bronze	Total
1	United States	2	0	1	3
2	Argentina	1	1	1	3
3	Venezuela	1	0	1	2
4	Chile	0	3	0	3
5	Brazil	0	0	1	1
Totals (5 entries)		4	4	4	12

=== Combined total ===
Updated after the 2023 Pan American Games

Rank	Nation	Gold	Silver	Bronze	Total
1	United States	63	38	27	128
2	Canada	38	17	20	75
3	Colombia	36	24	26	86
4	Argentina	25	24	32	81
5	Cuba	18	27	27	72
6	Venezuela	11	15	16	42
7	Mexico	10	29	21	60
8	Trinidad and Tobago	7	8	3	18
9	Chile	6	14	16	36
10	Uruguay	5	6	8	19
11	Ecuador	2	4	0	6
12	Brazil	1	10	16	27
13	Peru	1	0	3	4
14	Dominican Republic	1	0	0	1
14	Netherlands Antilles (AHO)	1	0	0	1
16	Jamaica	0	2	3	5
17	Costa Rica	0	1	1	2
17	El Salvador	0	1	1	2
17	Guatemala	0	1	1	2
20	Suriname	0	1	0	1
21	Bermuda	0	0	1	1
21	Bolivia	0	0	1	1
21	Paraguay	0	0	1	1
21	Puerto Rico	0	0	1	1
Totals (24 entries)		225	222	225	672
