= Cycling at the 1951 Pan American Games =

- Start date: 25 February 1951
- End date: 3 March 1951
- No. of events: 8

This page shows the results of the cycling competition at the 1951 Pan American Games, held from 25 February to 3 March 1951 in Buenos Aires, Argentina. There were a total number of eight medal events, with only men competing.

== Medal summary ==
=== Medal table ===
* Host nation (Argentina)

| Rank | NOC's | Gold | Silver | Bronze | Total |
|---|---|---|---|---|---|
| 1 | Argentina* | 7 | 4 | 4 | 15 |
| 2 | Chile | 1 | 3 | 1 | 5 |
| 3 | Mexico | 0 | 1 | 0 | 1 |
| 4 | Peru | 0 | 0 | 2 | 2 |
| 5 | Venezuela | 0 | 0 | 1 | 1 |
| Totals (5 entries) | | 8 | 8 | 8 | 24 |

== Track cycling ==
=== Men's 1000m Match Sprint (Track) ===
| Rank | Name |
|---|---|
| 1st place, gold medalist(s) | Antonio Giménez (ARG) |
| 2nd place, silver medalist(s) | Carlos Martínez (ARG) |
| 3rd place, bronze medalist(s) | Mario Masanés (CHI) |

=== Men's 1000m Time Trial (Track) ===
| Rank | Name |
|---|---|
| 1st place, gold medalist(s) | Clodomiro Cortoni (ARG) |
| 2nd place, silver medalist(s) | Hernán Masanés (CHI) |
| 3rd place, bronze medalist(s) | Jorge Sobrevila (ARG) |

=== Men's 40-lap Australian Pursuit (Track) ===
| Rank | Name |
|---|---|
| 1st place, gold medalist(s) | Ezequiel Ramírez (CHI) |
| 2nd place, silver medalist(s) | Alfredo Hersch (ARG) |
| 3rd place, bronze medalist(s) | Elvio Giacche (ARG) |

=== Men's 4000m Individual Pursuit (Track) ===
| Rank | Name |
|---|---|
| 1st place, gold medalist(s) | Jorge Vallmitjana (ARG) |
| 2nd place, silver medalist(s) | Pedro Salas (ARG) |
| 3rd place, bronze medalist(s) | Hernán Llerena (PER) |

=== Men's 4000m Team Pursuit (Track) ===
| Rank | Team |
|---|---|
| 1st place, gold medalist(s) | Argentina |
| 2nd place, silver medalist(s) | Chile |
| 3rd place, bronze medalist(s) | Venezuela |

== Road cycling ==
=== Men's Individual Race (Road) ===
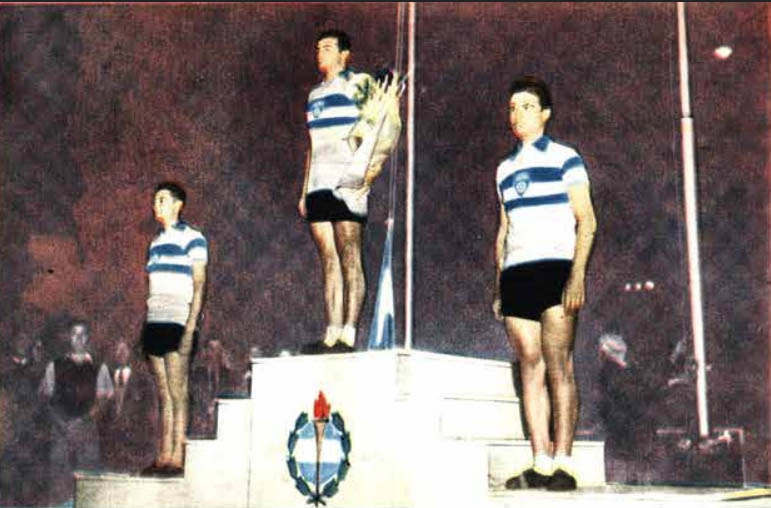
Three Argentine cyclists at the podium

| Rank | Name |
|---|---|
| 1st place, gold medalist(s) | Oscar Muleiro (ARG) |
| 2nd place, silver medalist(s) | Oscar Pezoa (ARG) |
| 3rd place, bronze medalist(s) | Humberto Varisco (ARG) |

=== Men's Individual Time Trial (Road) ===
| Rank | Name |
|---|---|
| 1st place, gold medalist(s) | Oscar Giacche (ARG) |
| 2nd place, silver medalist(s) | Héctor Rojas (CHI) |
| 3rd place, bronze medalist(s) | Rodolfo Caccavo (ARG) |

=== Men's Team Race (Road) ===
| Rank | Team |
|---|---|
| 1st place, gold medalist(s) | Argentina |
| 2nd place, silver medalist(s) | Mexico |
| 3rd place, bronze medalist(s) | Peru |

== See also ==
- Cycling at the 1952 Summer Olympics
