= Carlos Miguel Álvarez =

Argentine cyclist

Personal information
- Full name: Carlos Miguel Álvarez Seibanes
- Born: 5 May 1943 (age 83) La Plata, Argentina
- Height: 175 cm (5 ft 9 in)
- Weight: 74 kg (163 lb)

Cycling career
- Sport: Cycling
Medal record
Men's cycling
Representing Argentina
Pan American Games
Gold medal – first place	1967 Winnipeg	Team time trial
Bronze medal – third place	1979 San Juan	Team pursuit

Carlos Miguel Álvarez Seibanes (Note: In this Spanish name, the first or paternal surname is Álvarez and the second or maternal family name is Seibanes.) (born 5 May 1943) is an Argentine former cyclist. He competed at the 1968 Summer Olympics in the team time trial and team pursuit events and at the 1972 Summer Olympics in the individual pursuit and team pursuit events.

== See also ==
- Carlos Alberto Álvarez
