= Cycling at the 1975 Pan American Games =

This page shows the results of the Cycling Competition at the 1975 Pan American Games, held from October 12 to October 26, 1975 in Mexico City, Mexico. There were a total number of six events, with only men competing.

== Men's competition ==
=== Men's 1.000m Match Sprint (Track) ===
RANK	CYCLIST
1st place, gold medalist(s)	Steve Woznick (USA)
2nd place, silver medalist(s)	Octavio Dazzan (ARG)
3rd place, bronze medalist(s)	Carl Leusenkamp (USA)

=== Men's 1.000m Time Trial (Track) ===
RANK	CYCLIST
1st place, gold medalist(s)	Jocelyn Lovell (CAN)
2nd place, silver medalist(s)	David Weller (JAM)
3rd place, bronze medalist(s)	Steve Woznick (USA)

=== Men's 4.000m Individual Pursuit (Track) ===
RANK	CYCLIST
1st place, gold medalist(s)	Balbino Jaramillo (COL)
2nd place, silver medalist(s)	Francisco Huerta (MEX)
3rd place, bronze medalist(s)	Fernando Vera (CHI)

=== Men's 4.000m Team Pursuit (Track) ===
RANK	CYCLIST
1st place, gold medalist(s)	United States
2nd place, silver medalist(s)	Colombia
3rd place, bronze medalist(s)	Mexico

=== Men's Individual Race (Road) ===
RANK	CYCLIST
1st place, gold medalist(s)	Aldo Arencibia (CUB)
2nd place, silver medalist(s)	Alfonso Flórez (COL)
3rd place, bronze medalist(s)	Carlos Cardet (CUB)

=== Men's Team Time Trial (Road) ===
RANK	CYCLIST
1st place, gold medalist(s)	Mexico
2nd place, silver medalist(s)	Cuba
3rd place, bronze medalist(s)	Colombia

== Medal table ==
Rank	Nation	Gold	Silver	Bronze	Total
1	United States	2	0	2	4
2	Colombia	1	2	1	4
3	Cuba	1	1	1	3
3	Mexico	1	1	1	3
5	Canada	1	0	0	1
6	Argentina	0	1	0	1
6	Jamaica	0	1	0	1
8	Chile	0	0	1	1
Totals (8 entries)		6	6	6	18
