= Adolfo Belmonte =

Mexican cyclist (born 1945)

Personal information
- Full name: Adolfo Belmonte Heredia
- Born: 10 January 1945 (age 81) Ensenada, Mexico
- Height: 182 cm (6 ft 0 in)
- Weight: 70 kg (154 lb)

Cycling career
- Sport: Cycling
Medal record
Men's cycling
Representing Mexico
Pan American Games
Silver medal – second place	1967 Winnipeg	Team time trial

Adolfo Belmonte Heredia (Note: In this Spanish name, the first or paternal surname is Belmonte and the second or maternal family name is Heredia.) (born 10 January 1945) was a Mexican cyclist. He competed at the 1964 Summer Olympics and the 1968 Summer Olympics.
