= Roberto Brito =

Mexican cyclist (born 1947)

Personal information
- Full name: Roberto Brito Villegas
- Born: 7 August 1947 (age 79) Mexico City, Mexico
- Height: 178 cm (5 ft 10 in)
- Weight: 74 kg (163 lb)

Cycling career
- Sport: Cycling
Medal record
Men's cycling
Representing Mexico
Pan American Games
Silver medal – second place	1967 Winnipeg	Team time trial

Roberto Brito Villegas (Note: In this Spanish name, the first or paternal surname is Brito and the second or maternal family name is Villegas.) (born 7 August 1947) is a Mexican former cyclist. He competed in the team time trial at the 1968 Summer Olympics.
