= Pedro Caino =

Argentinian cyclist

Personal information
- Full name: Pedro Omar Caino
- Born: 29 June 1956 La Paz, Argentina
- Died: 14 August 2014 (aged 58) La Paz, Argentina
- Height: 182 cm (6 ft 0 in)
- Weight: 82 kg (181 lb)

Cycling career
- Sport: Cycling
Medal record
Men's cycling
Representing Argentina
Pan American Games
Bronze medal – third place	1979 San Juan	Team pursuit

Pedro Omar Caino (29 June 1956 – 14 August 2014) was an Argentine cyclist. He competed in the individual pursuit and team pursuit events at the 1984 Summer Olympics. He suffered a fatal heart attack while cycling near his home in 2014, at the age of 58.
