= Juan Carlos Haedo =

Argentine cyclist

Personal information
- Born: 3 January 1948 (age 78) Chascomús, Buenos Aires Province
- Height: 174 cm (5 ft 9 in)
- Weight: 73 kg (161 lb)

Cycling career
- Sport: Cycling
Medal record
Men's cycling
Representing Argentina
Pan American Games
| Bronze medal – third place | 1979 San Juan | Team pursuit |

Juan Carlos Haedo (born 3 January 1948) is an Argentine former cyclist. He competed at the 1976 Summer Olympics and 1984 Summer Olympics.
