= Agustín Alcántara =

Mexican cyclist (1946–1979)

Personal information
- Full name: Agustín Alcántara Estrada
- Born: 18 December 1946 Celayita, Mexico
- Died: 25 February 1979 (aged 32) Camagüey, Cuba
- Height: 176 cm (5 ft 9 in)
- Weight: 70 kg (154 lb)

Cycling career
- Sport: Cycling
Medal record
Men's cycling
Representing Mexico
Pan American Games
Silver medal – second place	1967 Winnipeg	Team time trial

Agustín Alcántara Estrada (Note: In this Spanish name, the first or paternal surname is Alcántara and the second or maternal family name is Estrada.) (18 December 1946 – 25 February 1979) was a Mexican cyclist. He competed at the 1968 Summer Olympics and the 1972 Summer Olympics.

He died after competing in the 1979 Tour of Cuba.
