= Cycling at the 1955 Pan American Games =

This page shows the results of the Cycling Competition at the 1955 Pan American Games, held from March 12 to March 26, 1955 in Mexico City, Mexico. There were a total number of five medal events, with only men competing.

== Track cycling ==
=== Men's 1000m Match Sprint (Track) ===
Rank	Name
1st place, gold medalist(s)	Jorge Batiz (ARG)
2nd place, silver medalist(s)	Juan Pérez (URU)
3rd place, bronze medalist(s)	Cenobio Ruiz (MEX)

=== Men's 1000m Time Trial (Track) ===
Rank	Name
1st place, gold medalist(s)	Antonio di Micheli (VEN)
2nd place, silver medalist(s)	Octavio Echeverry (COL)
3rd place, bronze medalist(s)	Luis Serra (URU)

=== Men's 4000m Team Pursuit (Track) ===
Rank	Name
1st place, gold medalist(s)	Argentina
2nd place, silver medalist(s)	Uruguay
3rd place, bronze medalist(s)	Mexico

== Road cycling ==
=== Men's Individual Race (Road) ===
Rank	Name
1st place, gold medalist(s)	Ramón Hoyos (COL)
2nd place, silver medalist(s)	Benjamín Jiménez (COL)
3rd place, bronze medalist(s)	Alberto Velázquez (URU)

=== Men's Team Race (Road) ===
Rank	Name
1st place, gold medalist(s)	Colombia
2nd place, silver medalist(s)	Uruguay
3rd place, bronze medalist(s)	Mexico
