= Cycling at the 1959 Pan American Games =

Cycling at the I959 Pan American Games
- Venue: Gately Stadium

This page shows the results of the Cycling Competition at the 1959 Pan American Games, held from August 27 to September 7, 1959 in Chicago, United States. There were a total number of five medal events, with only men competing.

== Men's competition ==
=== Men's 1000 m Match Sprint (Track) ===
RANK	CYCLIST
	Juan Canto (ARG)
	Jack Disney (USA)
	Carlos Vásquez (ARG)

=== Men's 1000 m Time Trial (Track) ===
RANK	CYCLIST
	Anesio Argenton (BRA)
	David Staub (USA)
	Ricardo Senn (ARG)

=== Men's 4000 m Team Pursuit (Track) ===
RANK	CYCLIST
	United States
	Uruguay
	Argentina

=== Men's Individual Race (Road) ===
RANK	CYCLIST
	Ricardo Senn (ARG)
	Francisco Lozano (MEX)
	René Deceja (URU)

=== Men's Team Race (Road) ===
RANK	CYCLIST
	Argentina
	Mexico
	Uruguay
