= Cycling at the 1971 Pan American Games =

This page shows the results of the Cycling Competition at the 1971 Pan American Games, held from July 30 to August 13, 1971 in Cali, Colombia. There were a total number of six events, with only men competing.

== Men's competition ==
=== Men's 1.000m Match Sprint (Track) ===
RANK	CYCLIST
1st place, gold medalist(s)	Leslie King (TRI)
2nd place, silver medalist(s)	Daniel Larreal (VEN)
3rd place, bronze medalist(s)	Víctor Limba (ARG)

=== Men's 1.000m Time Trial (Track) ===
RANK	CYCLIST
1st place, gold medalist(s)	Jocelyn Lowell (CAN)
2nd place, silver medalist(s)	Leslie King (TRI)
3rd place, bronze medalist(s)	Harold Halsey (USA)

=== Men's 4.000m Individual Pursuit (Track) ===
RANK	CYCLIST
1st place, gold medalist(s)	Martín Emilio Rodríguez (COL)
2nd place, silver medalist(s)	Juan Merlos (ARG)
3rd place, bronze medalist(s)	Francisco Huerta (MEX)

=== Men's 4.000m Team Pursuit (Track) ===
RANK	CYCLIST
1st place, gold medalist(s)	Colombia
2nd place, silver medalist(s)	Argentina
3rd place, bronze medalist(s)	United States

=== Men's Individual Race (Road) ===
RANK	CYCLIST
1st place, gold medalist(s)	John Howard (USA)
2nd place, silver medalist(s)	Luis Carlos Flores (BRA)
3rd place, bronze medalist(s)	Jaime Galeano (COL)

=== Men's Team Time Trial (Road) ===
RANK	CYCLIST
1st place, gold medalist(s)	Cuba
2nd place, silver medalist(s)	Colombia
3rd place, bronze medalist(s)	Argentina
