= Roberto Menéndez =

Cuban cyclist

Personal information
- Born: 9 October 1949 (age 77)

Cycling career
- Sport: Cycling

Roberto Menéndez (born 9 October 1949) is a Cuban former cyclist. He competed at the 1968, 1972 and the 1976 Summer Olympics as well as the 1971 and 1975 Pan American Games.

At the 1971 Pan American Games in Cali, Colombia, he won a gold medal for the Men's Team Time Trial event alongside Gregorio Aldo Arencibia, Pedro Rodríguez, and Galio Albolo. At the 1975 Pan American Games in Mexico City, he won the silver medal for the same event alongside Aldo Arencibia, Carlos Cardet, and José Prieto.
