= Eduardo Trillini =

Argentine cyclist

Personal information
- Full name: Eduardo Walter Trillini
- Born: 20 June 1958 (age 68) San Miguel, Buenos Aires, Argentina
- Height: 176 cm (5 ft 9 in)
- Weight: 79 kg (174 lb)

Cycling career
- Sport: Cycling
Medal record
Men's cycling
Representing Argentina
Pan American Games
| Bronze medal – third place | 1979 San Juan | Team pursuit |

Eduardo Walter Trillini (born 20 June 1958) is an Argentine former cyclist. He competed in the team pursuit event at the 1984 Summer Olympics.
