= Delmo Delmastro =

Argentine cyclist

Personal information
- Born: 15 August 1936 (age 90) Lozzolo, Vercelli, Italy
- Height: 168 cm (5 ft 6 in)
- Weight: 70 kg (154 lb)

Cycling career
- Sport: Cycling
Medal record
Men's cycling
Representing Argentina
Pan American Games
Gold medal – first place	1967 Winnipeg	Time trial - team
Bronze medal – third place	1963 São Paulo	Road race - individual

Delmo Delmastro (born 15 August 1936) is a former Argentine cyclist. He competed in the individual road race and team time trial events at the 1964 Summer Olympics. He was born in Italy and moved to Buenos Aires with his parents at the age of 16.
