= Trillini =

Trillini is an Italian surname. Notable people with the surname include:

- Eduardo Trillini (born 1958), Argentine cyclist
- Giovanna Trillini (born 1970), Italian foil fencer
- Sebastián Trillini (born 1994), Argentine road and track cyclist
