= Radamés Treviño =

Mexican cyclist (1945–1970)

Personal information
- Full name: Radamés Eliud Treviño Llanas
- Born: 7 December 1945 Monterrey, Mexico
- Died: 12 April 1970 (aged 24)
- Height: 185 cm (6 ft 1 in)
- Weight: 70 kg (154 lb)

Cycling career
- Sport: Cycling
Medal record
Men's cycling
Representing Mexico
Pan American Games
Silver medal – second place	1967 Winnipeg	100 km team time trial
Silver medal – second place	1967 Winnipeg	4 km team pursuit
Bronze medal – third place	1967 Winnipeg	4 km ind. pursuit

Radamés Eliud Treviño Llanas (Note: In this Spanish name, the first or paternal surname is Treviño and the second or maternal family name is Llanas.) (7 December 1945 – 12 April 1970) was a Mexican road and track cyclist who won two silver and one bronze medals at the 1967 Pan American Games: in the 100 km team time trial and in the 4 km pursuit, individual and with a team. He competed in these three events at the 1968 Olympics with a best result of fifth place in the individual pursuit.

On 21 October 1967 he rode the individual pursuit world record in a time of 4'49.73" on a velodrome in Mexico. Later in 1969 he set a world hour record.

Treviño died after a crash during a regional race between Pachuca and Mexico City. A velodrome in Mexico is named in his honor.
