= Wilde Baridón =

Uruguayan cyclist

Personal information
- Full name: Wilde H. Baridón Ricca
- Born: 26 April 1941 Tarariras
- Died: 29 November 1965 (aged 24) Montevideo
- Weight: 71 kg (157 lb)

Cycling career
- Sport: Cycling
Medal record
Men's cycling
Representing Uruguay
Pan American Games
Silver medal – second place	1963 São Paulo	Road race - individual
Gold medal – first place	1963 São Paulo	Road race - team

Wilde H. Baridón Ricca (Note: In this Spanish name, the first or paternal surname is Baridón and the second or maternal family name is Ricca.) (26 April 1941 – 29 November 1965) was a Uruguayan cyclist. He competed in the individual road race and team time trial events at the 1964 Summer Olympics.
