= Cycling at the 1983 Pan American Games =

This page shows the results of the Cycling Competition at the 1983 Pan American Games, held from August 14 to August 29, 1983 in Caracas, Venezuela. There were a total number of seven events, with only men competing. The Points Race was added to the program.

== Track competitions ==
=== Men's 1.000m Match Sprint (Track) ===
RANK	CYCLIST
1st place, gold medalist(s)	Nelson Vails (USA)
2nd place, silver medalist(s)	Les Barczewski (USA)
3rd place, bronze medalist(s)	José Urquijo (CHI)

=== Men's 1.000m Time Trial (Track) ===
RANK	CYCLIST
1st place, gold medalist(s)	Rory O'Reilly (USA)
2nd place, silver medalist(s)	Marcelo Alexandre (ARG)
3rd place, bronze medalist(s)	David Weller (JAM)

=== Men's 50 km Points Race (Track) ===
RANK	CYCLIST
1st place, gold medalist(s)	John Beckman (USA)
2nd place, silver medalist(s)	Juan Curuchet (ARG)
3rd place, bronze medalist(s)	Peter Aldridge (JAM)

=== Men's 4.000m Individual Pursuit (Track) ===
RANK	CYCLIST
1st place, gold medalist(s)	David Grylls (USA)
2nd place, silver medalist(s)	José Ruiz (VEN)
3rd place, bronze medalist(s)	Gabriel Curuchet (ARG)

=== Men's 4.000m Team Pursuit (Track) ===
RANK	CYCLIST
1st place, gold medalist(s)	United States
2nd place, silver medalist(s)	Cuba
3rd place, bronze medalist(s)	Brazil

== Road competitions ==
=== Men's Individual Race (Road) ===
RANK	CYCLIST
1st place, gold medalist(s)	Luis Rosendo Ramos (MEX)
2nd place, silver medalist(s)	Carlos Jaramillo (COL)
3rd place, bronze medalist(s)	Gustavo Parra (VEN)

=== Men's Team Time Trial (Road) ===
RANK	CYCLIST
1st place, gold medalist(s)	United States
2nd place, silver medalist(s)	Cuba
3rd place, bronze medalist(s)	Venezuela

== Medal table ==
Place	Nation	Gold medal	Silver medal	Bronze medal	Total
1	United States	6	1	0	7
2	Mexico	1	0	0	1
3	Argentina	0	2	1	3
4	Cuba	0	2	0	2
5	Venezuela	0	1	2	2
6	Colombia	0	1	0	1
7	Jamaica	0	0	2	2
8	Chile	0	0	1	1
8	Brazil	0	0	1	1
Total		7	7	7	21
