= Rodolfo Rodino =

Uruguayan cyclist

Personal information
- Born: 31 July 1937 (age 89) Montevideo, Uruguay

Cycling career
- Sport: Cycling

Rodolfo Rodino (born 31 July 1937) is a former Uruguayan cyclist. He competed in the individual road race and team pursuit events at the 1960 Summer Olympics.

In the previous games, the 1956 Summer Olympics in Melbourne, Rodino competed in the cycling team along with his compatriots Alberto Velázquez and Alberto Domínguez.
