= Cycling at the 1963 Pan American Games =

This page shows the results of the cycling competition at the 1963 Pan American Games, held from April 20 to May 5, 1963 in São Paulo, Brazil. There were a total number of five medal events, with only men competing.

== Men's competition ==
=== Men's 1.000m match sprint (track) ===
Rank	Name
1st place, gold medalist(s)	Roger Gibbon (TRI)
2nd place, silver medalist(s)	James Rossi (USA)
3rd place, bronze medalist(s)	Edgardo Molinaroli (ARG)

=== Men's 1.000m time trial (track) ===
Rank	Name
1st place, gold medalist(s)	Carlos Vásquez (ARG)
2nd place, silver medalist(s)	Roger Gibbon (TRI)
3rd place, bronze medalist(s)	Anesio Argenton (BRA)

=== Men's 4.000m team pursuit (track) ===
Rank	Team
1st place, gold medalist(s)	Uruguay
2nd place, silver medalist(s)	Argentina
3rd place, bronze medalist(s)	Mexico

=== Men's individual race (road) ===
Rank	Name
1st place, gold medalist(s)	Gregorio Carrizalez (VEN)
2nd place, silver medalist(s)	Wilde Baridon (URU)
3rd place, bronze medalist(s)	Delmo Delmastro (ARG)

=== Men's team race (road) ===
Rank	Team
1st place, gold medalist(s)	Uruguay
2nd place, silver medalist(s)	United States
3rd place, bronze medalist(s)	Venezuela
