= Héctor Acosta (cyclist) =

Argentine cyclist (1933–1973)

Personal information
- Born: 9 December 1933 Rosario, Santa Fe, Argentina
- Died: 1 November 1973 Rosario, Santa Fe, Argentina

Cycling career
- Sport: Cycling

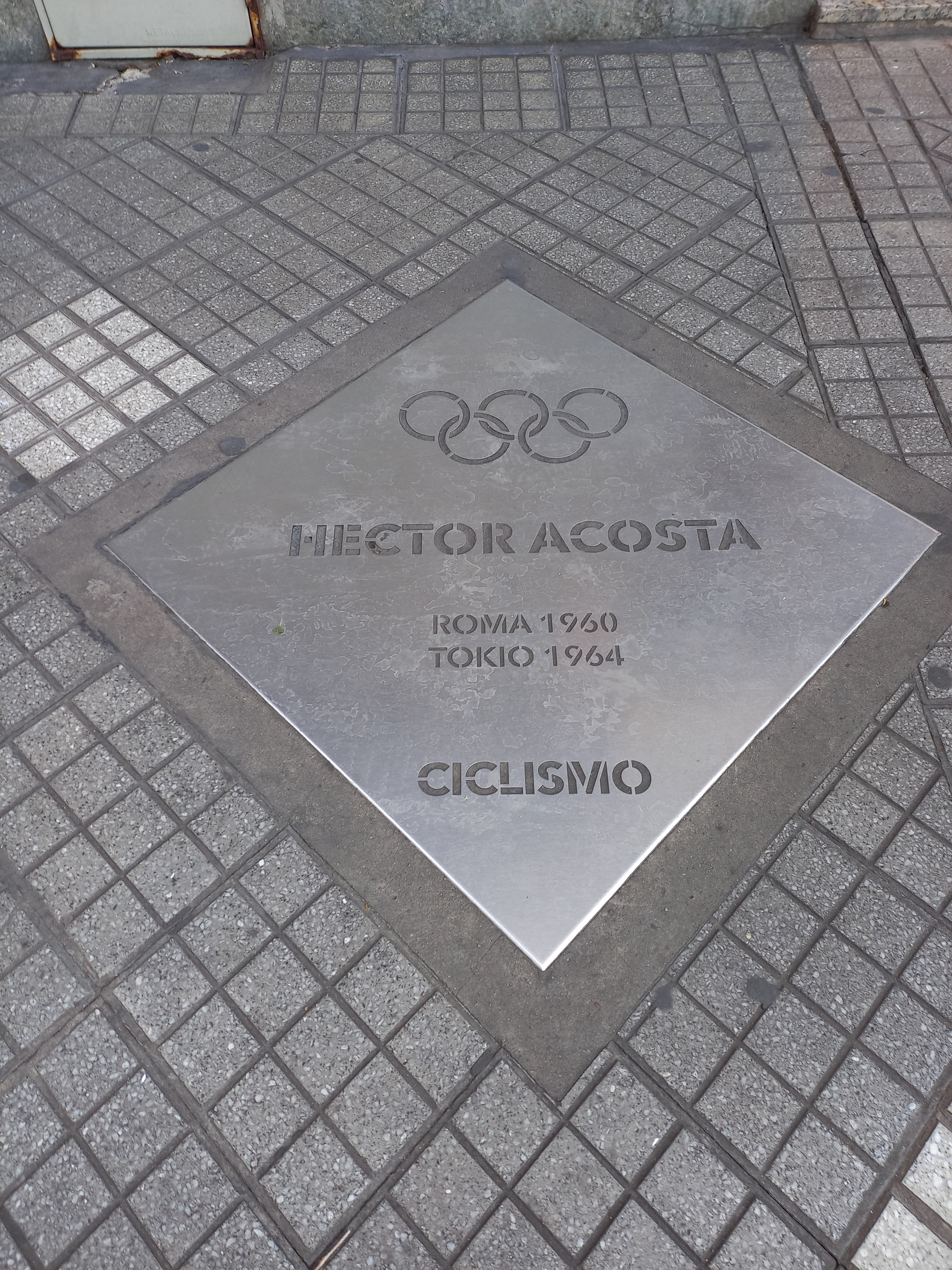
Plaque dedicated to Héctor Acosta on the Olympic walkway in Rosario, Argentina (photo by JMafoe)

Héctor H. Acosta (9 December 1933 – 1 November 1973) was an Argentine former cyclist. He competed at the 1960 Summer Olympics and the 1964 Summer Olympics.
