= Wes Chowen =

American cyclist

Personal information
- Full name: Wesley John Chowen
- Born: May 25, 1939 (age 87) Santa Monica, California, United States

Cycling career
- Sport: Cycling
Medal record
Men's cycling
Representing the United States
Pan American Games
Bronze medal – third place	1967 Winnipeg	4,000 m team pursuit

Wesley John Chowen (born May 25, 1939) is an American former cyclist. He competed at the 1960 Summer Olympics, 1964 Summer Olympics, and the 1967 Pan American Games, where he won a bronze medal in the team pursuit.

A graduate of the University of Southern California, Chowen joined the United States Marine Corps where he became a pilot. After leaving the Marines, Chowen became a commercial pilot for Continental and United Airlines, while living in Denver with his wife.
