= Pedro Rodríguez (cyclist, born 1950) =

Cuban cyclist

Personal information
- Born: 12 February 1950 (age 76)

Cycling career
- Sport: Cycling

Pedro Rodríguez (born 12 February 1950) is a former Cuban cyclist. He competed in the individual road race and team time trial events at the 1972 Summer Olympics. as well as the men's time trial at the 1971 Pan American Games.

At the 1971 Pan American Games in Cali, Colombia, he won a gold medal for the Men's Team Time Trial event alongside Gregorio Aldo Arencibia, Roberto Menéndez, and Galio Albolo.
