= Martín Emilio Rodríguez =

Colombian cyclist

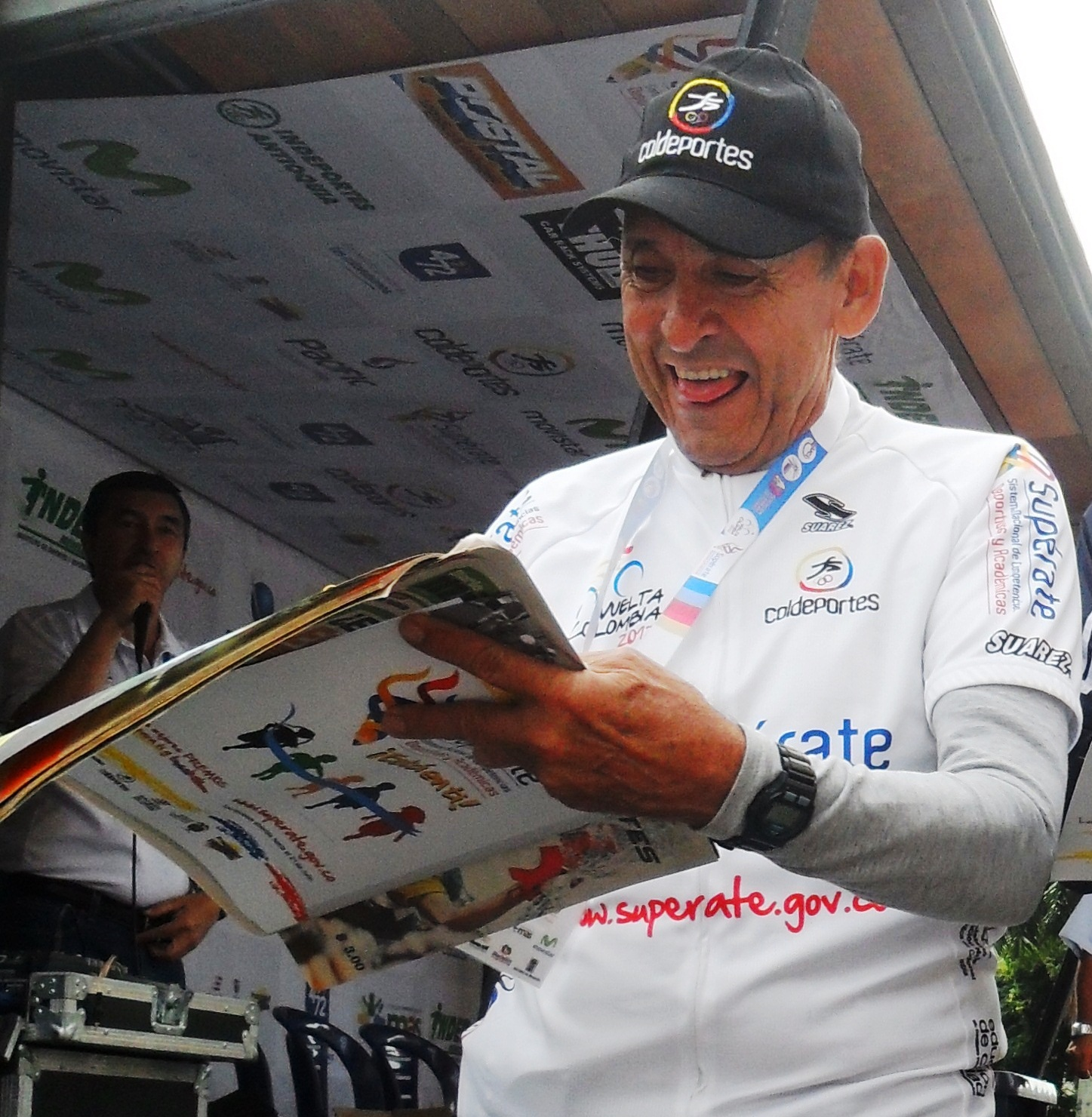

Personal information
- Full name: Martín Emilio Rodríguez Gutiérrez
- Nickname: Cochise
- Born: 14 April 1942 (age 84) Medellín, Colombia

Cycling career
- Sport: Cycling
- Current team: Retired
- Disciplines: Road; Track
- Role: Rider
- Rider type: Climbing specialist

Amateur teams
- 1961: Blue Bell
- 1962–1971: Wrangler–Caribú
- 1976: Castalia
- 1979: Pilas Varta
- 1980: Pilsen Cervunión

Professional teams
- 1972: Salvarani
- 1973–1975: Bianchi–Campagnolo

Major wins
- Vuelta a Colombia (1963, 1965, 1966, 1967); Vuelta al Táchira (1966, 1968, 1971)

Martín Emilio Rodríguez Gutiérrez (born 14 April 1942), known by the nickname Cochise, is a retired Colombian road and track cyclist.

Cochise started his first Vuelta a Colombia in 1961. He would win his first Vuelta two years later in 1963 and would win the event four times in total. He was the road racing champion of Colombia in 1965. He had won gold in the 4,000-metre pursuit at the Central American Games in 1962, the Bolivarian Games in 1965, the American Games in 1965 and 1966 and the Pan-American Games in 1967. Cochise also won Colombia's second most important stage race, the Clásico RCN, in 1963 as well as winning the Vuelta al Táchira in Venezuela three times. On 7 October 1970, Cochise beat the world hour record, with a distance of 47.566 km.

In 1971 in Track World Championships in Varese (Italy), Rodriguez won the Amateurs 4.000ms individual track pursuit beating Swiss Josef Fuchs. Cochise turned professional in 1973 where he won two stages in the Giro d'Italia. Cochise was partnered with the great Italian champion Felice Gimondi for two-man time trial events and won the 1973 Baracchi Trophy and the Verona Grand Prix. Cochise rode the 1975 Tour de France and finished 27th overall. After 1975, Cochise returned to Colombia and competed again as an amateur, winning a final stage in the Vuelta a Colombia in 1980. Cochise is currently involved with a Colombian professional team Indeportes Antioquia that has former time trial world champion Santiago Botero.

The nickname "Cochise" is derived from the fact that he was a great admirer of the Apache chief Cochise.

He also competed at the 1964 Summer Olympics and the 1968 Summer Olympics.

== Major results ==
=== Road ===
1961
1st Stage 3 Vuelta a Colombia
1962
2nd Overall Vuelta a Colombia

1st Stages 5 & 13

2nd Team time trial, Central American and Caribbean Games
1963
1st Overall Vuelta a Colombia

1st Stages 3, 4, 6, 8, 15 & 16

1st Overall Clásico RCN
1964
1st Overall Vuelta a Colombia

1st Stages 3, 7, 9, 10, 11, 13, 15, 16 & 19

1965
2nd Overall Vuelta a Colombia

1st Stage 5

1966
1st Overall Vuelta a Colombia

1st Stages 3, 5, 6, 8, 9, 10, 13 & 18

1st Overall Vuelta al Táchira

1st Stages 3 & 5

Central American and Caribbean Games

1st Road race
1st Team time trial

1967
1st Overall Vuelta a Colombia

1st Stages 6, 10, 13 & 18

1968
1st Overall Vuelta al Táchira
7th Overall Vuelta a Colombia

1st Stage 9

9th Road race, Summer Olympics
1969
2nd Overall Vuelta a Colombia

1st Stages 3 & 8

1970
1st Team time trial, Central American and Caribbean Games
1st Stage 8 Vuelta a Colombia
1971
1st Overall Vuelta al Táchira
1st Stage 11 Vuelta a Colombia
1972
1st Stages 3 & 9 Vuelta a Colombia
3rd Overall Clásico RCN
1973
1st Gran Premio Città di Camaiore
1st Trofeo Baracchi (with Felice Gimondi)
1st Stage 15 Giro d'Italia
3rd Giro di Romagna
1974
2nd Trofeo Baracchi (with Gösta Pettersson)
3rd GP du canton d'Argovie
3rd GP Forli
5th GP Lugano
7th Gran Premio Città di Camaiore
1975
1st Stage 19 Giro d'Italia
1st Overall Cronostaffetta (TTT)

1st Stage 1a (ITT)

9th Milano–Torino
10th Giro del Veneto
1980
1st Stage 10 Vuelta a Colombia

=== Grand Tour general classification results timeline ===
Grand Tour	1973	1974	1975
Giro d'Italia	41	18	33
Tour de France	—	—	27
Vuelta a España	—	—	—

=== Track ===
1962
1st Individual pursuit, Central American and Caribbean Games
1965
Bolivarian Games

1st Individual pursuit
1st Team pursuit

1966
1st Individual pursuit, Central American and Caribbean Games
1967
1st Individual pursuit, Pan American Games
1970
1st Individual pursuit, Bolivarian Games
1st Individual pursuit, Central American and Caribbean Games
World hour record for amateurs, at the Agustín Melgar velodrome, Mexico City, 7 October 1970, 47,566.24 kilometers. 6
1971
1st Individual pursuit, UCI Amateur Track World Championships
Pan American Games

1st Individual pursuit
1st Team pursuit
