= Gabriel Curuchet =

Argentine cyclist

Personal information
- Full name: Gabriel Ovidio Curuchet
- Born: 24 June 1963 (age 63) Buenos Aires, Argentina

Cycling career
- Sport: Cycling
- Discipline: Track
- Role: Rider
Medal record
Men's track cycling
Representing Argentina
UCI Track World Championships
Silver medal – second place	1995 Bogota	Madison
Bronze medal – third place	1997 Perth	Madison
Bronze medal – third place	2001 Antwerp	Madison
Pan American Games
Gold medal – first place	Indianapolis 1987	Individual pursuit
Gold medal – first place	Winnipeg 1999	Madison
Bronze medal – third place	Caracas 1983	Individual pursuit

Gabriel Ovidio Curuchet (born 24 June 1963) is an Argentine retired road bicycle racer and track cyclist, who represented his native country at four Summer Olympics (1984, 1988, 1996 and 2000). He won the gold medal in the Men's 4.000m Individual Pursuit at the 1987 Pan American Games, followed by the gold in the Men's Madison in 1999 with his brother Juan Curuchet. He was a professional rider from 1989 to 2005.
