= Juan Curuchet =

Argentine cyclist (born 1965)

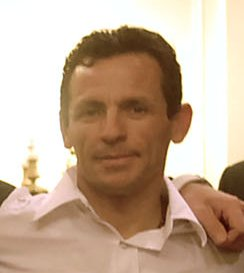

Personal information
- Full name: Juan Esteban Curuchet
- Born: 4 February 1965 (age 61) Mar del Plata, Argentina
- Height: 1.75 m (5 ft 9 in)
- Weight: 75 kg (165 lb; 11.8 st)

Cycling career
- Sport: Cycling
- Discipline: Track
- Role: Rider

Professional teams
- 1989–1991: Giessegi
- 1992: Rudy Project
- 1992–1995: Supermercados Toledo
Medal record
Representing Argentina
Men's track cycling
Olympic Games
Gold medal – first place	2008 Beijing	Madison
World Championships
Gold medal – first place	2004 Melbourne	Madison
Silver medal – second place	1995 Bogota	Madison
Silver medal – second place	2001 Antwerp	Points Race
Bronze medal – third place	1992 Valencia	Points Race
Bronze medal – third place	1997 Perth	Madison
Bronze medal – third place	2000 Manchester	Madison
Bronze medal – third place	2001 Antwerp	Madison
Bronze medal – third place	2002 Ballerup	Madison
Bronze medal – third place	2002 Ballerup	Points Race
Bronze medal – third place	2003 Stuttgart	Madison
Bronze medal – third place	2004 Melbourne	Points Race
Bronze medal – third place	2006 Bordeaux	Madison
Pan American Games
Gold medal – first place	1999 Winnipeg	Madison
Gold medal – first place	2003 Santo Domingo	Madison
Gold medal – first place	2007 Rio de Janeiro	Madison
Silver medal – second place	1983 Caracas	Points Race
Silver medal – second place	2003 Santo Domingo	Team Pursuit
Pan American Championships
Gold medal – first place	2005 Mar del Plata	Points race
Gold medal – first place	2005 Mar del Plata	Madison
Gold medal – first place	2006 São Paulo	Madison

Juan Esteban Curuchet (born 4 February 1965 in Mar del Plata) is an Argentine road bicycle racer and track cyclist.

Curuchet represented Argentina at the Summer Olympics in 1984, 1988, 1996, 2000, 2004, and 2008.

He won the madison at the 1999 Pan American Games with his older brother, Gabriel Ovidio Curuchet. He also won the madison at the 2003 Pan American Games and 2007 Pan American Games alongside Walter Pérez and the Cycling World Championships in 2004 (Men's Madison).

Curuchet holds an Argentine record of participating in six non-consecutive Olympic games. He retired from his Olympic career at age 43, by winning the Men's Madison gold medal at the 2008 Summer Olympics with Walter Pérez.

In 2008, he received the gold Gold Olimpia Award as the best athlete of the year from his country with Walter Pérez. In 2000 and 2010 he won the Platinum Konex Award as the best cyclist of the last decade in Argentina.

== Major results ==
1992
3rd Points race, UCI Track Cycling World Championships, Valencia
2nd Six Days of Buenos Aires (ARG)

1994
1st Vuelta al Valle (ARG)

1995
2nd Madison, UCI Track Cycling World Championships, Bogota
1st Mar del Plata, Six Days (ARG) (with Gabriel Curuchet

1997
1st Clásica del Oeste-Doble Bragado (ARG)
2nd Medellin, Six Days (COL)
3rd Madison, UCI Track Cycling World Championships, Perth

1998
1st Clásica del Oeste-Doble Bragado (ARG)
1st National Time Trial Championship, Argentina (ARG)
1st UCI Track World Cup, Cali, Madison (COL) (with Gabriel Curuchet)

1999
1st Six Days of Buenos Aires (ARG) (with Gabriel Curuchet)
1st Frisco, Madison, Frisco, Texas, (USA) (with Gabriel Curuchet)
2nd UCI Track World Cup, Cali, Madison (COL)
1st UCI Track World Cup, Cali, Points race (COL)

2000
1st Clásica del Oeste-Doble Bragado (ARG)
3rd Madison, UCI Track Cycling World Championships, Manchester
1st Six Days of Buenos Aires (ARG) (with Gabriel Curuchet)

2001
3rd Madison, UCI Track Cycling World Championships, Antwerp
2nd Points race, UCI Track Cycling World Championships

2002
2nd Aguascalientes, Six Days (MEX)
3rd Madison, UCI Track Cycling World Championships
3rd Points race, UCI Track Cycling World Championships
1st National Time Trial Championship, Santiago del Estero (ARG)

2003
3rd Madison, UCI Track Cycling World Championships
3rd Vuelta de San Juan (ARG)

2nd Stage 2, Vuelta de San Juan

1st Clásica del Oeste-Doble Bragado (ARG)

3rd Stage 4 Clásica del Oeste-Doble Bragado
2nd Stage 5b, Clásica del Oeste-Doble Bragado
1st Stage 5a, Clásica del Oeste-Doble Bragado

1st UCI Track World Cup, Aguascalientes, Madison (MEX) (with Walter Pérez)
2nd UCI Track World Cup, Aguascalientes, Points race (MEX)
1st Cape Town, Madison (RSA) (with Walter Pérez)
1st Fiorenzuola d' Arda, Six Days (ITA) (with Giovanni Lombardi)
1st Tre Giorni Citta di Pordenone (ITA) (with Walter Pérez)
1st Madison, National Track Championship, Cordoba (ARG) (with Walter Pérez)

2004
1st Madison, UCI Track Cycling World Championships (with Walter Pérez)
3rd Points race, UCI Track Cycling World Championships, Melbourne
3rd Stage 5 Vuelta de San Juan (ARG)
1st UCI Track World Cup, Moscow, Madison (RUS) (with Walter Pérez)
3rd UCI Track World Cup, Moscow, Points race (RUS)
1st Aguascalientes, Points race (MEX)
1st Sydney, Madison (AUS) (with Walter Pérez)

2005
1st Points race, Pan American Championships, Mar del Plata
1st Madison, Pan American Championships, Mar del Plata (with Walter Pérez)
1st Tre Giorni Citta di Pordenone (ITA) (with Walter Pérez)
3rd Fiorenzuola d' Arda, Six Days (ITA)
2nd Torino, Six Days, Torino (ITA)

2006
2nd Clásica del Oeste-Doble Bragado (ARG)

2nd Stage 6a, Clásica del Oeste-Doble Bragado

2nd Madison, UCI Track Cycling World Championships, Bordeaux

2007
2nd Clásica del Oeste-Doble Bragado (ARG)

2nd Stage 6b, Clásica del Oeste-Doble Bragado
2nd Stage 6a, Clásica del Oeste-Doble Bragado

3rd UCI Track World Cup, Manchester, Points race (GBR)
2nd Clasica 1° de Mayo Argentina (ARG)
2nd Fiorenzuola d' Arda, Six Days (ITA)
1st Torino, Six Days (ITA) (with Walter Pérez)
2nd Apertura Mercedes (ARG)

2008
1st Stage 1, Criterium Internacional, Mar del Plata (ARG)
2nd Stage 2, Criterium Internacional, Mar del Plata (ARG)

2009
Argentina National Time Trial Champion

Awards
Preceded by Ángel Cabrera	Olimpia de Oro; 2008 (alongside Walter Pérez)	Succeeded by Juan Martín del Potro
