= Gregorio Aldo Arencibia =

Cuban cyclist (born 1947)

Personal information
- Born: 12 March 1947 (age 79) Havana, Cuba

Cycling career
- Sport: Cycling

Gregorio Aldo Arencibia (born 12 March 1947) is a Cuban former cyclist. He competed at the 1972, 1976 and 1980 Summer Olympics as well as the 1971 and 1975 Pan American Games.

At the 1971 Pan American Games in Cali, Colombia, he won a gold medal for the Men's Team Time Trial event alongside Roberto Menéndez, Pedro Rodríguez, and Galio Albolo. At the 1975 Pan American Games in Mexico City, he won the silver medal for the same event alongside Roberto Menéndez, Carlos Cardet, and José Prieto.
