= Juan José Timón =

Uruguayan cyclist

Personal information
- Born: 18 November 1937 Fray Bentos, Uruguay
- Died: 13 July 2001 (aged 63)

Cycling career
- Sport: Cycling

Juan José Timón (18 November 1937 – 13 July 2001) was a Uruguayan cyclist. He competed at the 1960 Summer Olympics and the 1964 Summer Olympics.
