= Amanda Sin =

Canadian cyclist

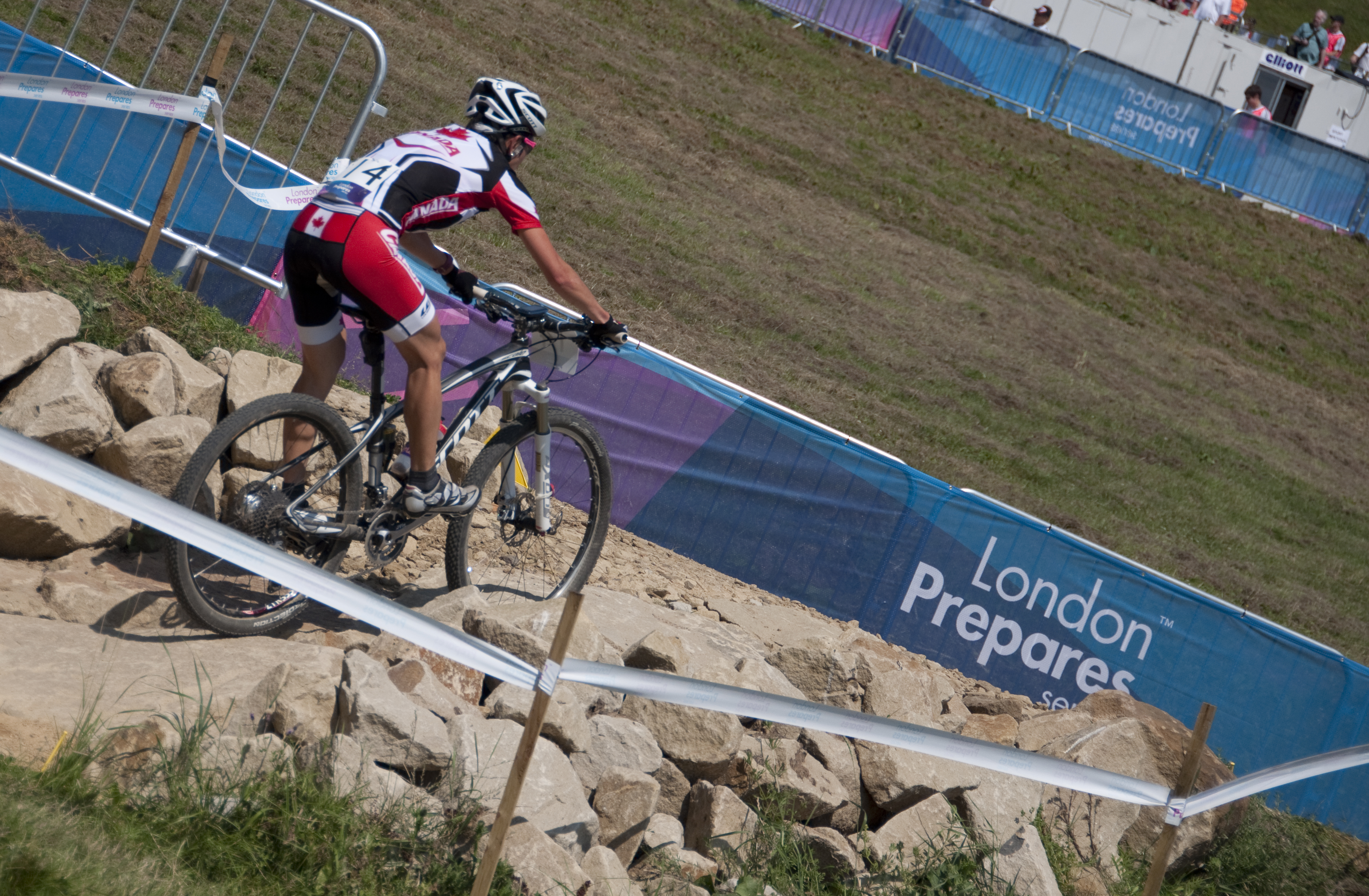

Personal information
- Born: 3 February 1977 (age 49) Collingwood, Ontario, Canada

Sport
- Sport: Cycling
Medal record
Women's cycling
Representing Canada
Pan American Games
Bronze medal – third place	2011 Guadalajara	Mountain biking

Amanda Sin (born 3 February 1977) is a Canadian cross-country mountain biker from Collingwood, Ontario. She is a member of the Canadian National team. She had great success for Canada at the 2011 Pan American Games when the 34-year-old won Canada's first medal at those games.
