= Marcos Mazzaron =

Brazilian cyclist

Personal information
- Born: 5 November 1963 (age 62)

Cycling career
- Sport: Cycling
Medal record
Men's cycling
Representing Brazil
Pan American Games
Silver medal – second place	1987 Indianapolis	Road Race

Marcos Mazzaron (born 5 November 1963) is a retired road bicycle racer and track cyclist from Brazil.

Mazzaron represented his native country at two consecutive Summer Olympics, starting in 1984. He also won the silver medal in the Men's Individual Race Race (171 km) at the 1987 Pan American Games.
