= Lorenza Morfín =

Mexican cyclist

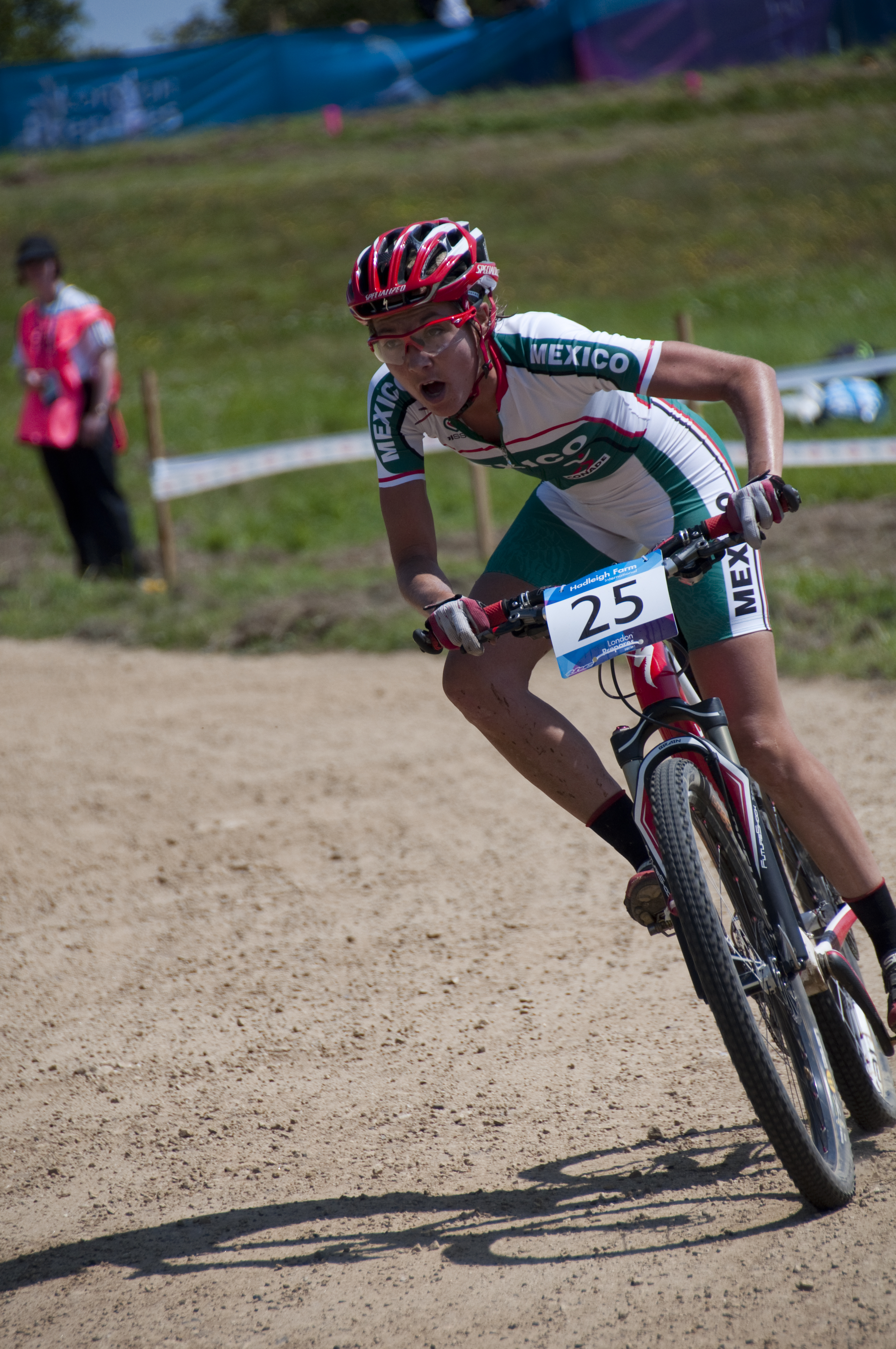

Personal information
- Full name: Laura Lorenza Morfin Macouzet
- Born: 9 January 1982 (age 44) Cuernavaca, Morelos, Mexico

Cycling career
- Sport: Cycling
- Discipline: Road cycling

Professional teams
- 2010: Team Valdarno Umbria
- 2014: Forno d'Asolo–Astute
Medal record
Representing Mexico
Pan American Games
Bronze medal – third place	2007 Rio de Janeiro	Mountain bike

Laura Lorenza Morfin Macouzet (born 9 January 1982 in Cuernavaca, Morelos) is a road cyclist from Mexico. She represented her nation at the 2006, 2008 and 2009 UCI Road World Championships.

== See also ==
- List of people from Morelos
