= Pedro Salas =

Argentine cyclist

Personal information
- Born: 7 December 1923 Córdoba, Argentina
- Died: 15 June 2000 (aged 76) Córdoba, Argentina

Cycling career
- Sport: Cycling

Pedro Salas (7 December 1923 – 15 June 2000) was an Argentine cyclist. He competed in the 4,000 metres team pursuit event at the 1952 Summer Olympics.
