= Sara Neil (cyclist) =

Canadian retired road bicycle racer (born 1960)

Personal information
- Full name: Sara Neil
- Born: 2 September 1960 (age 66) Guildford, United Kingdom

Cycling career
- Sport: Cycling
- Discipline: Road
- Role: Rider
Medal record
Women's road cycling
Representing Canada
Pan American Games
Bronze medal – third place	1987 Indianapolis	Road Race

Sara Louise Neil (born 2 September 1960) is a Canadian retired road bicycle racer, who won the bronze medal in the women's individual road race at the 1987 Pan American Games. A resident of Vancouver, British Columbia, she represented Canada at the same event at the 1988 Summer Olympics, finishing in 39th place. She has two daughters. She now teaches physical education at Lord Byng Secondary in Vancouver, British Columbia.
