= Oscar Giacché =

Argentine cyclist (1923–2005)

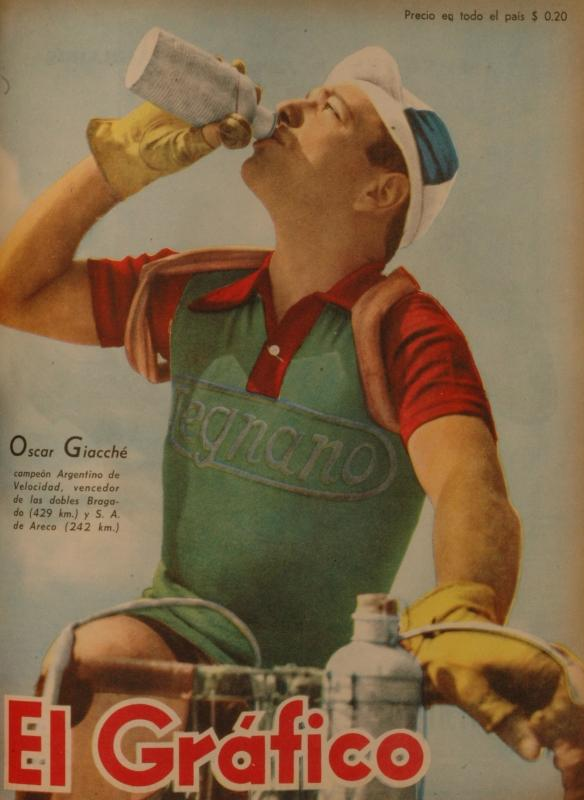

Personal information
- Born: 14 August 1923
- Died: 21 October 2005 (aged 82)

Cycling career
- Sport: Cycling

Oscar Giacché (14 August 1923 – 21 October 2005) was an Argentine cyclist. He competed at the 1948 and 1952 Summer Olympics.
