= Jhon González =

Colombian cyclist (born 1971)

Personal information
- Born: 29 August 1971 (age 55)

Cycling career
- Sport: Cycling
Medal record
Representing Colombia
Pan American Games
| Silver medal – second place | 1999 Winnipeg | Sprint |
| Bronze medal – third place | 1991 Havana | Sprint |
Central American and Caribbean Games
| Bronze medal – third place | 1998 Maracaibo | Sprint |

Jhon Jaime González Jiménez (born 29 August 1971) is a Colombian former cyclist. He competed in the men's sprint at the 1992 Summer Olympics.
