= Luis Rosendo Ramos =

Mexican cyclist (born 1957)

Personal information
- Born: 6 September 1957 (age 69)

Cycling career
- Sport: Cycling
Medal record
Men's cycling
Representing Mexico
Pan American Games
Gold medal – first place	1983 Caracas	Road Race
Gold medal – first place	1987 Indianapolis	Road Race

Luis Rosendo Ramos Maldonado (born 6 September 1957) is a retired road bicycle racer from Mexico, who twice won the men's individual road race at the Pan American Games: in 1983 and 1987. He represented his native country at the 1976, 1984 and 1988 Summer Olympics.
