= David Weller =

Jamaican cyclist

Personal information
- Born: 11 February 1957 (age 69)

Cycling career
- Sport: Cycling
Medal record
Men's track cycling
Representing Jamaica
Olympic Games
Bronze medal – third place	1980 Moscow	1000m Time Trial
Commonwealth Games
Bronze medal – third place	1978 Edmonton	1000m Match Sprint
Pan American Games
Silver medal – second place	1975 Mexico City	1000m Time Trial
Silver medal – second place	1979 San Juan	1000m Time Trial
Bronze medal – third place	1983 Caracas	1000m Time Trial

David Weller (born 11 February 1957) is a retired Jamaican track cyclist.

Weller won a bronze medal in 1000 metres time trial at the 1980 Summer Olympics in Moscow, becoming the first (and still the only) Jamaican to win an Olympic medal in another sport than athletics.

At the next Olympic Games in Los Angeles 1984, Weller finished sixth as a result of a serious pre-Olympic competition injury received in a crash in Medellin, Colombia two months before his 1984 Olympic competition.
