= Walter Pérez (cyclist) =

Argentine cyclist (born 1975)

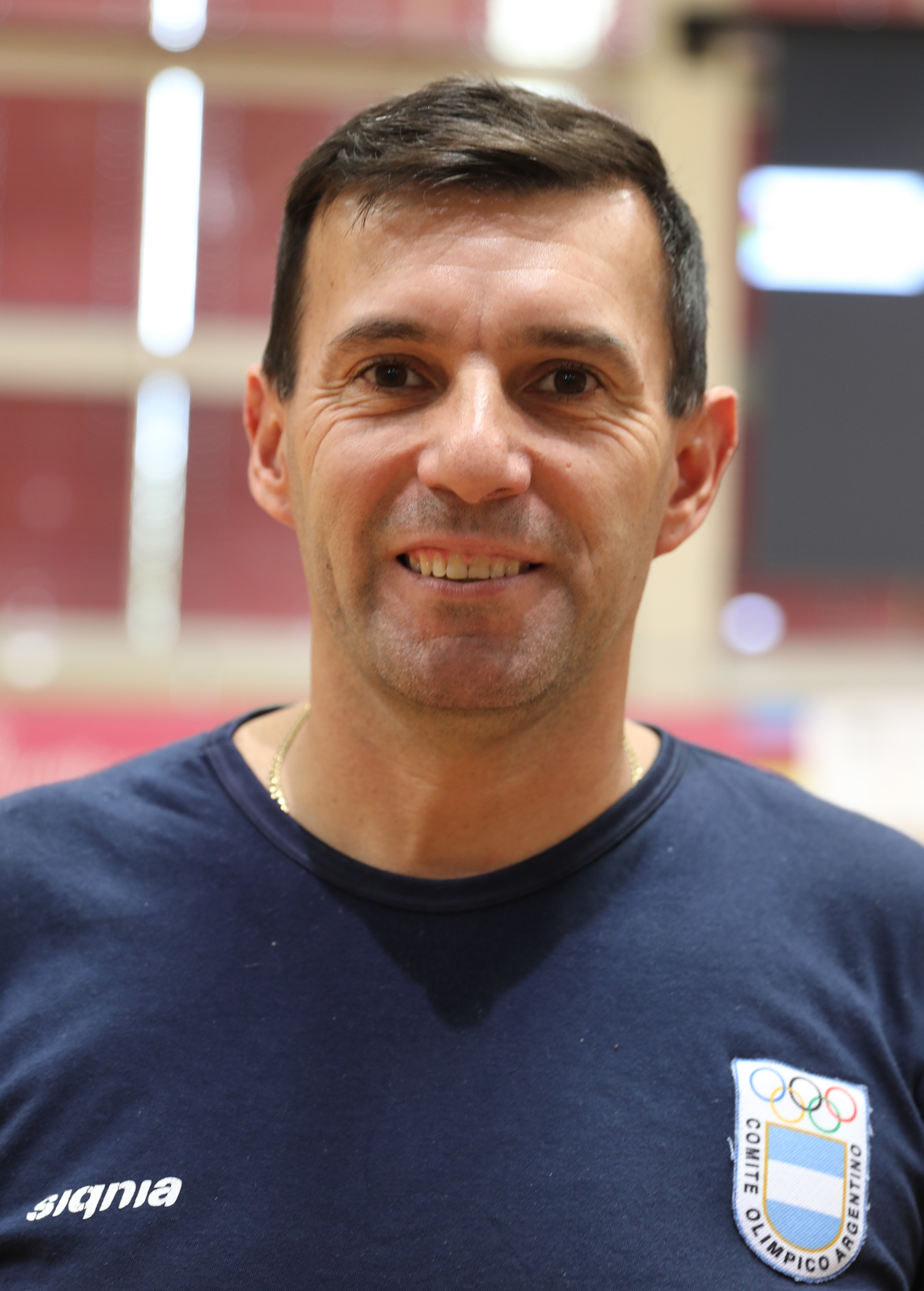
- Pérez in 2019

Personal information
- Full name: Walter Fernando Pérez
- Born: 31 January 1975 (age 51) San Justo, Argentina

Cycling career
- Sport: Cycling
- Discipline: Track
- Role: Rider
- Rider type: Endurance
Medal record
Men's track cycling
Representing Argentina
Olympic Games
Gold medal – first place	2008 Beijing	Madison
World Championships
Gold medal – first place	2004 Melbourne	Madison
Silver medal – second place	2007 Palma de Mallorca	Omnium
Bronze medal – third place	2003 Stuttgart	Madison
Bronze medal – third place	2004 Melbourne	Scratch
Bronze medal – third place	2006 Bordeaux	Madison
Pan American Games
Gold medal – first place	2003 Santo Domingo	Madison
Gold medal – first place	2007 Rio de Janeiro	Madison
Silver medal – second place	1995 Mar del Plata	Team Pursuit
Silver medal – second place	1999 Winnipeg	Team Pursuit
Silver medal – second place	2003 Santo Domingo	Team Pursuit
Silver medal – second place	2015 Toronto	Team Pursuit
Bronze medal – third place	2011 Guadalajara	Omnium
Bronze medal – third place	2011 Guadalajara	Team Pursuit
Pan American Championships
Gold medal – first place	2005 Mar del Plata	Madison
Gold medal – first place	2006 São Paulo	Madison
Gold medal – first place	2006 São Paulo	Scratch
Bronze medal – third place	2005 Mar del Plata	Scratch

Walter Fernando Pérez (born 31 January 1975) is an Argentine racing cyclist. He won a gold medal at the 2008 Summer Olympics.

Pérez, who joined the Argentine cycling team in 1992, won the Cycling World Championships in 2004 and Men's Madison gold medal at the 2008 Summer Olympics with teammate Juan Curuchet. Walter also won two gold medals at the Pan American Games (2003 in Santo Domingo and 2007 in Rio de Janeiro).

Walter carried the flag for his country at the opening ceremony of the 2011 Pan American Games in Guadalajara, Mexico, and 2015 Pan American Games in Toronto, Canada.

In 2008, he received the Gold Olimpia Award as the best athlete of the year from his country with Juan Curuchet; and in 2010 they won the Platinum Konex Award as the best cyclist of the last decade in Argentina.

Awards
Preceded by Ángel Cabrera	Olimpia de Oro; 2008 (alongside Juan Curuchet)	Succeeded by Juan Martín del Potro
