= Max Plaxton =

Canadian cross-country mountain biker

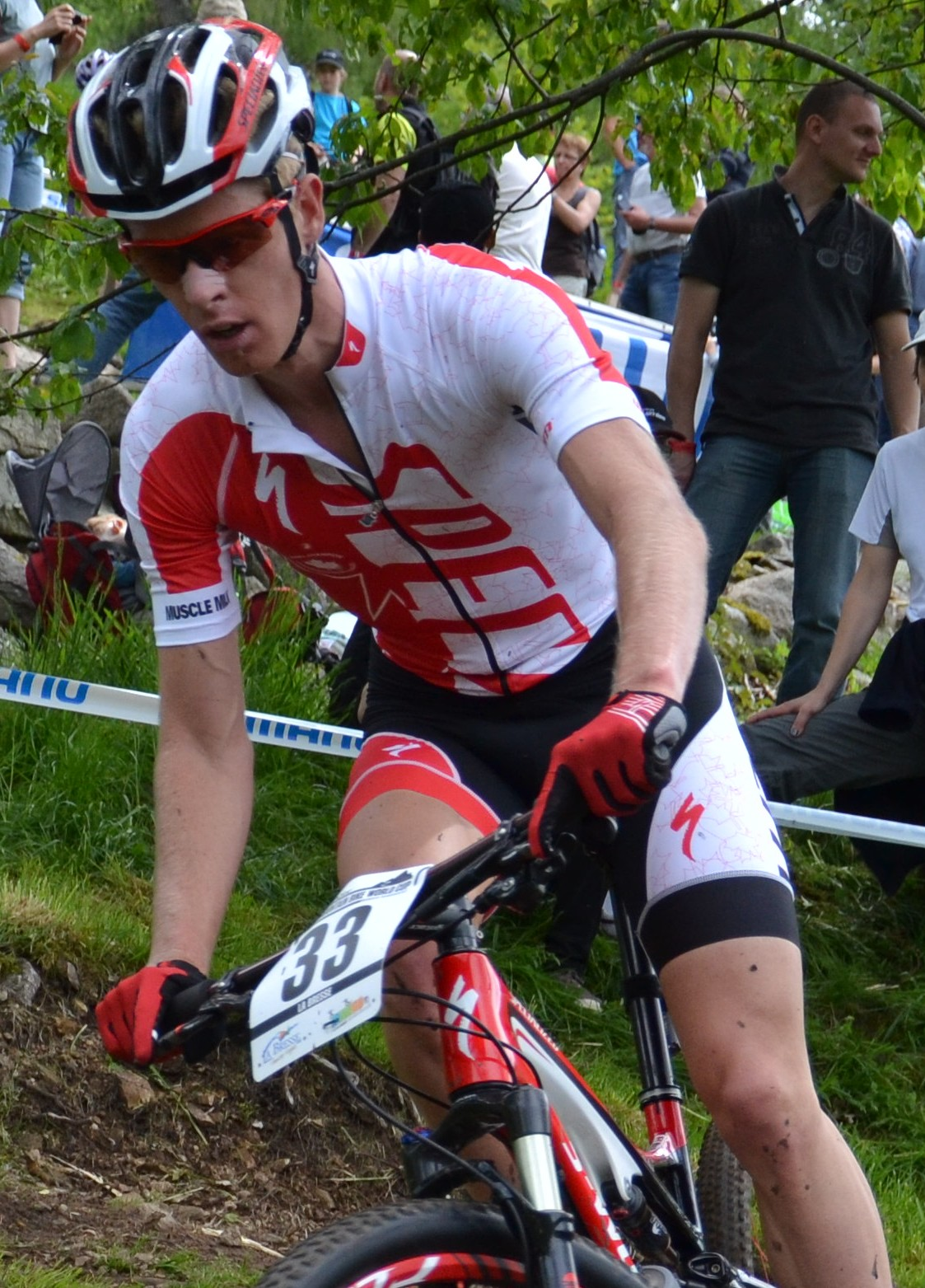
- Plaxton in 2012

Personal information
- Born: 29 May 1985 (age 41) Tofino, British Columbia
- Height: 183 cm (6.00 ft)
- Weight: 70 kg (150 lb)

Sport
- Country: Canada
- Sport: Mountain biking
Medal record
Men's Mountain biking
Representing Canada
Pan American Games
Silver medal – second place	2011 Guadalajara	Cross-country
- Updated on 7 February 2013

Max Plaxton is a Canadian cross-country mountain biker. At the 2012 Summer Olympics, he competed in the Men's cross-country at Hadleigh Farm, but did not finish due to a knee injury. He raced the entire 2012 UCI XC world cup and had a career best finish in France breaking into the top ten in elite. His main sponsor is Cannondale bikes.
