= Carlos Alberto Vázquez =

Argentine cyclist

Personal information
- Born: 13 February 1934
- Died: 27 November 2020 (aged 86)
- Height: 179 cm (5 ft 10 in)
- Weight: 78 kg (172 lb)

Cycling career
- Sport: Cycling

Carlos Alberto Vázquez (13 February 1934 – 27 November 2020) was an Argentine cyclist. He competed in the men's sprint and the 1000m time trial events at the 1964 Summer Olympics.
