= Rodolfo Caccavo =

Argentine cyclist (1927–1958)

Personal information
- Born: 24 October 1927 Buenos Aires, Argentina
- Died: 17 February 1958 (aged 30) Buenos Aires, Argentina

Cycling career
- Sport: Cycling

Rodolfo Caccavo (24 October 1927 – 17 February 1958) was an Argentine cyclist. He competed in the 4,000 metres team pursuit event at the 1952 Summer Olympics.
