= Dario Alejandro Gasco =

Argentine mountain biker

Personal information
- Full name: Dario Alejandro Gasco
- Born: 20 January 1987 (age 39) Concepción, Argentina
- Height: 1.80 m (5 ft 11 in)
- Weight: 68 kg (150 lb)

Cycling career
- Sport: Cycling
- Current team: Unattached
- Discipline: Mountain biking
- Role: Rider
- Rider type: Cross-country

Professional teams
- 2005: Zenith MTB International Team
- 2007–2009: Massi
Medal record
Men's mountain biking
Representing Argentina
Pan American Games
Bronze medal – third place	2007 Rio de Janeiro	Cross-country

Dario Alejandro Gasco (born January 20, 1987, in Concepción, Tucumán) is an Argentine professional mountain biker. He won a bronze medal in men's cross-country racing at the 2007 Pan American Games, and later represented his nation Argentina at the 2008 Summer Olympics. Throughout his sporting career, Gasco has been training and riding for four consecutive seasons on Zenith MTB International, and Spain's Massi Cycling Team.

Gasco spotted officially on his major international debut at the 2007 Pan American Games in Rio de Janeiro, Brazil, where he delivered a bronze-medal time of 2:07:37 in the men's cross-country race, trailing behind U.S. rider Adam Craig and Brazil's Rubens Donizete within a two-minute gap.

At the 2008 Summer Olympics in Beijing, Gasco qualified for the Argentine squad in the men's cross-country race by receiving an invitational berth from the Union Cycliste Internationale (UCI), based on his best performance at the World and Pan American Championships. He scored a twenty-seventh place in a 4.8-km sturdy, treacherous cross-country course with a time of 2:07:04.
