= Octavio Echeverry =

Colombian cyclist (born 1931)

Octavio Echeverri Bernal
Personal information
- Born: 22 March 1931 Abejorral, Colombia

Cycling career
- Sport: Cycling

Octavio Echeverri (born 22 March 1931) is a Colombian former cyclist. He competed in the time trial and team pursuit events at the 1956 Summer Olympics.
