= Enrique Campos =

Venezuelan cyclist

Personal information
- Born: 7 January 1961 (age 65)

Cycling career
- Sport: Cycling
Medal record
Men's cycling
Representing Venezuela
Pan American Games
Bronze medal – third place	1987 Indianapolis	Road Race

Enrique Campos (born 7 January 1961) is a retired road bicycle racer from Venezuela. He represented his native country at two consecutive Summer Olympics, starting in 1984. Campos also won the bronze medal in the Men's Individual Race Race (171 km) at the 1987 Pan American Games. He was nicknamed “El Águila” during his career.
