= Roger Gibbon =

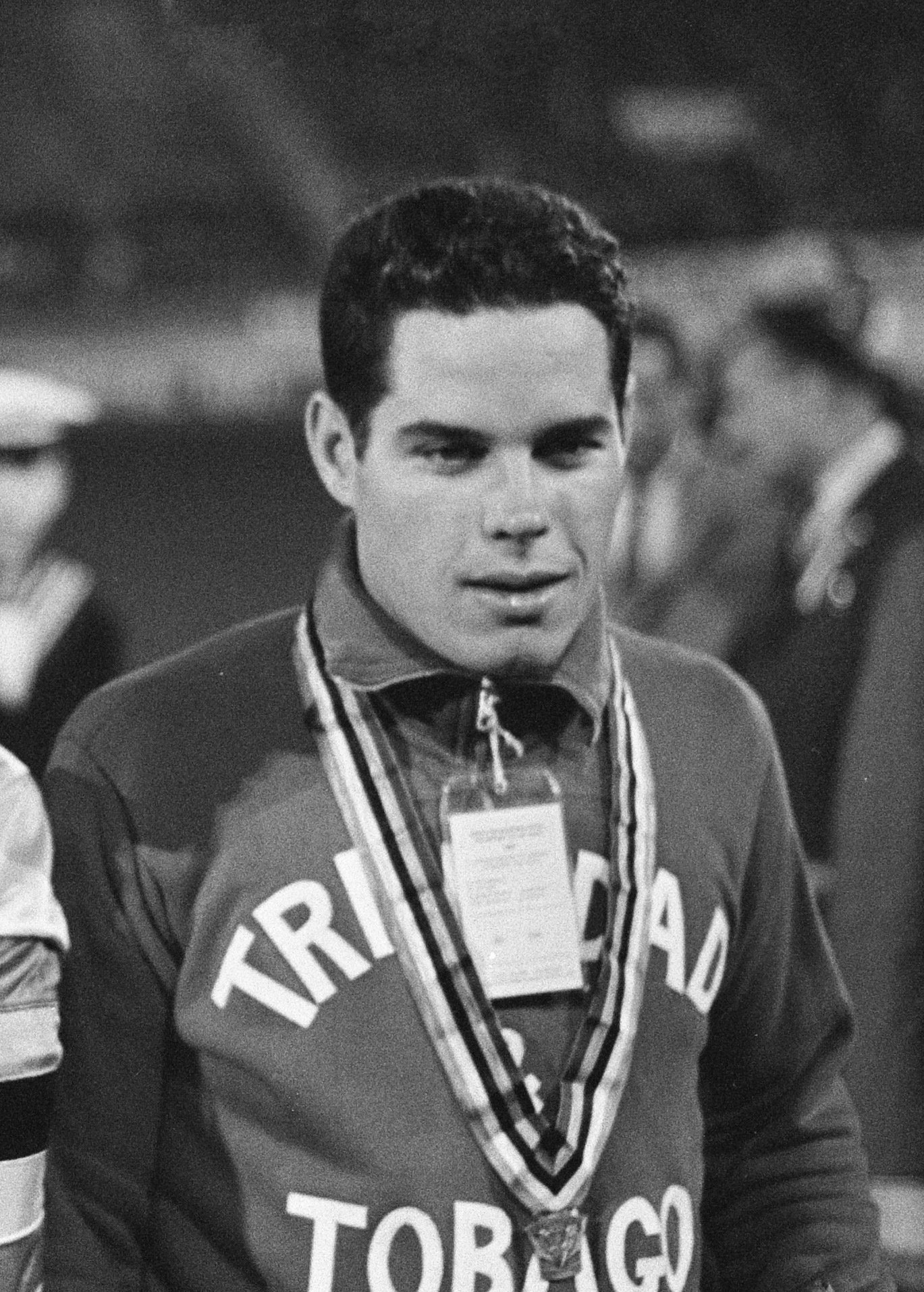
- Roger Gibbon in 1967

Personal information
- Full name: Roger Gibbon
- Born: 9 March 1944 (age 82)
- Height: 1.72 m (5 ft 8 in)
- Weight: 78 kg (172 lb)

Cycling career
- Sport: Cycling
- Discipline: Track
- Role: Rider
- Rider type: Sprinter
Medal record
Representing Trinidad and Tobago
Men's track cycling
World Championships
Bronze medal – third place	1967 Amsterdam	1 km
Pan American Games
Gold medal – first place	São Paulo 1963	1 km sprint
Silver medal – second place	São Paulo 1963	1 km time trial
Gold medal – first place	Winnipeg 1967	1 km sprint
Gold medal – first place	Winnipeg 1967	1 km time trial

Roger Patrick Gibbon (born 9 March 1944) is a retired track cyclist from Trinidad and Tobago. He was most successful in the 1 km sprint and time trial events, winning a bronze medal at the 1967 world championships and three gold medals at the 1963 and 1967 Pan American Games. He competed in these two events at the 1964 and 1968 Summer Olympics with the best achievement of fifth place in the time trial in 1968. He is of Portuguese descent.

Olympic Games
Preceded by Wendell Mottley	Flagbearer for Trinidad and Tobago; Mexico City 1968	Succeeded by Hasely Crawford
