= Jason Richardson (BMX racer) =

Create article on Jason Richardson the international professional (BMX racer) Cyclist

Personal information
- Full name: Jason Amed Richardson
- Nicknames: "Demolition Man", "JRich"
- Born: August 19, 1974 (age 52) Burlington, New Jersey, U.S.
- Height: 1.82 m (6 ft 0 in)
- Weight: 90 kg (200 lb)

Cycling career
- Sport: Cycling
- Discipline: Bicycle Motocross (BMX)
- Role: Racer
- Rider type: Off Road

Amateur team
- 1991-1992: Auburn Cycles

Professional teams
- 1992-1993: Auburn Cycles
- 1994-1995: TNT
- 1995-1999: Giant/Mosh
- 2000-2004: Crupi
- 2005-2008: Haro Bicycles
Medal record
Men's BMX racing
Representing United States
UCI World Championships
Gold medal – first place	1994 Waterford Oaks	Elite Men's Cruiser
Pan American Games
Gold medal – first place	2007 Rio de Janeiro	Men's BMX

Jason Richardson (born August 19, 1974) is an American former professional BMX racer. He won the 1994 UCI BMX World Championships in the Superclass Cruiser category in Waterford Oaks, Michigan. In 2007 he won the gold medal in the elite men's category at the 2007 Pan American Games. He retired from racing in 2008 and finished his doctorate in 2011 to work with athletes and professionals as a Doctor in Psychology.
