= Ricardo Senn =

Argentine cyclist

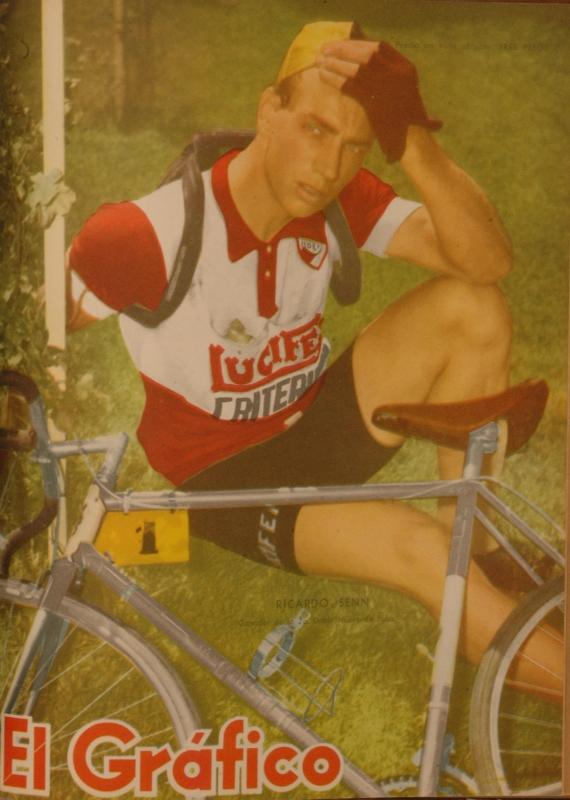
- Senn in El Gráfico, 1958

Personal information
- Born: 3 April 1931 Córdoba, Argentina
- Died: 26 July 2012 (aged 81)
Medal record
Men's cycling
Representing Argentina
Pan American Games
Gold medal – first place	1959 Chicago	Individual Road Race
Bronze medal – third place	1959 Chicago	1.000m Time Trial

Ricardo S. Senn (3 April 1931 – 26 July 2012) was a track and road bicycle racer from Argentina, who won the men's individual road race at the 1959 Pan American Games. He represented his native country at the 1960 Summer Olympics, finishing in 44th place in the men's road race.
