= Marcel Roy =

Canadian cyclist

Personal information
- Born: April 21, 1942 (age 84) Quebec City, Canada

Cycling career
- Sport: Cycling

Marcel Roy (born April 21, 1942) is a Canadian former cyclist. He competed in the individual road race and the team time trial events at the 1968 Summer Olympics. He won gold in the 1967 Pan American Games.
