= Juan Alberto Merlos =

Argentine cyclist (1945–2021)

Personal information
- Born: 25 May 1945 Buenos Aires, Argentina
- Died: 19 June 2021 (aged 76)

Cycling career
- Sport: Cycling

Juan Alberto Merlos (25 May 1945 – 19 June 2021) was an Argentine cyclist. He competed at the 1964 Summer Olympics and the 1968 Summer Olympics.
