= René Deceja =

Uruguayan cyclist (1934–2007)

Personal information
- Born: 16 April 1934 Canelones, Uruguay
- Died: 21 July 2007 (aged 73) La Paz, Uruguay

Cycling career
- Sport: Cycling

René Deceja (16 April 1934 – 21 July 2007) was a Uruguayan cyclist. He competed at the 1956 Summer Olympics and the 1968 Summer Olympics.
