= Rory O'Reilly =

American cyclist

Personal information
- Born: June 25, 1955 (age 71) Greenport, New York, United States

Cycling career
- Sport: Cycling

Rory O'Reilly (born June 25, 1955) is an American former cyclist. He competed in the 1000m time trial "kilo" event at the 1984 Summer Olympics on a custom bicycle built by Mike Celmins.
