= Alberto Velázquez =

Uruguayan cyclist (1934–2026)

Personal information
- Born: 16 July 1934 Casupá, Uruguay
- Died: 18 July 2026 (aged 92) Montevideo, Uruguay

Cycling career
- Sport: Cycling

Alberto Camilo Velázquez (16 July 1934 – 18 July 2026) was a Uruguayan cyclist. He competed at the 1956 Summer Olympics and the 1960 Summer Olympics. In the former he was teammate with Rodolfo Rodino and Alberto Domínguez.

In 2003 he was honored for his work by the Departmental Board of Montevideo. In 2018 he was awarded the "José Nasazzi - Obdulio Varela" prize awarded by the House of Representatives.
