= Francisco Huerta =

Mexican cyclist (born 1947)

Personal information
- Born: 10 August 1947 (age 79)

Cycling career
- Sport: Cycling

Francisco Javier Huerta Franco (born 10 August 1947) is a Mexican former cyclist. He competed at the 1972 Summer Olympics and the 1976 Summer Olympics.
