= Oscar Pezoa =

Argentine cyclist (1933–2023)

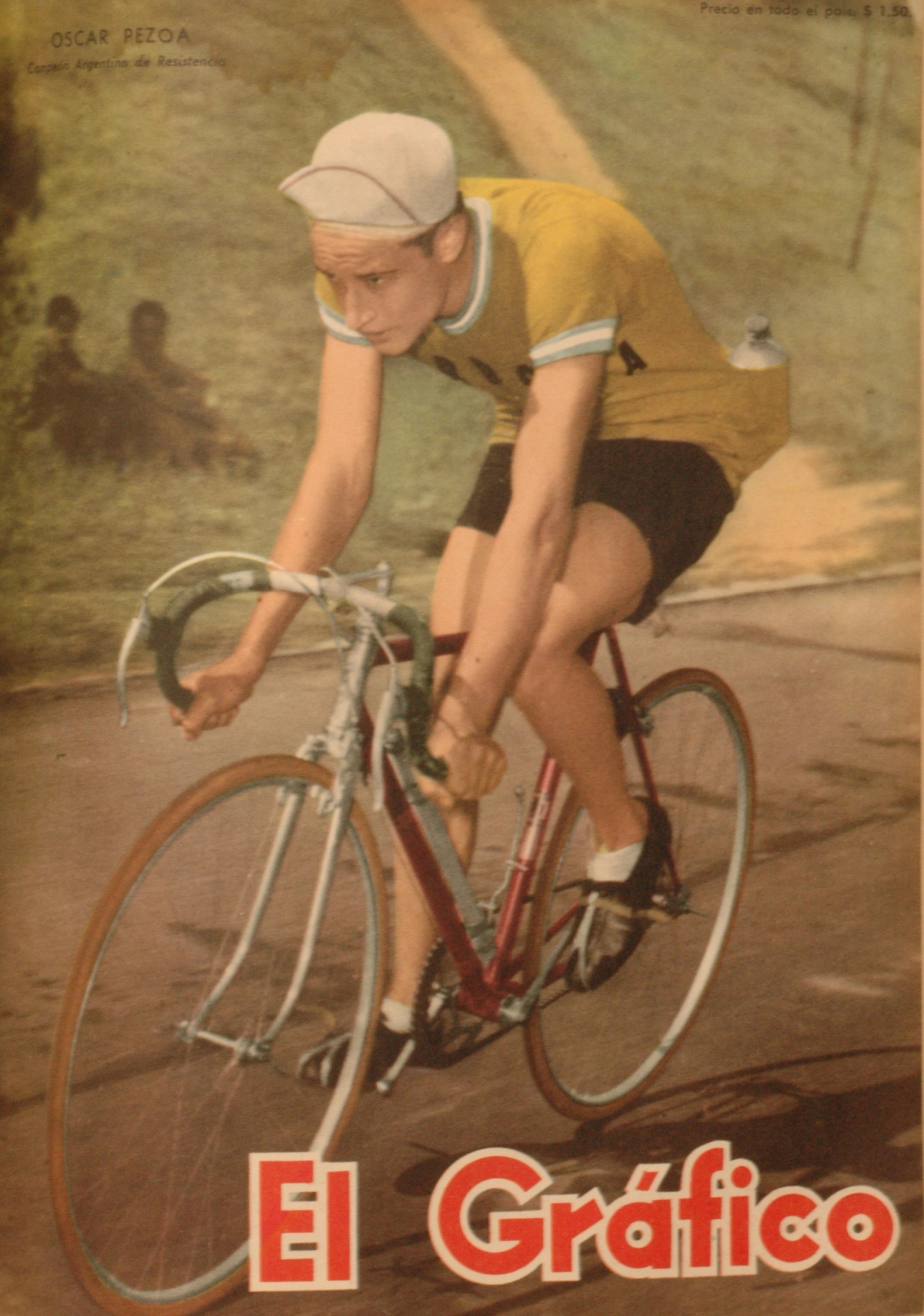

Personal information
- Born: 2 May 1933 San Francisco, Córdoba, Argentina
- Died: 8 June 2023 (aged 90) San Francisco, Córdoba, Argentina

Cycling career
- Sport: Cycling

Óscar Pezoa (2 May 1933 – 8 June 2023) was an Argentine cyclist. He competed in the 4,000 metres team pursuit event at the 1952 Summer Olympics.

Pezoa died in San Francisco, Córdoba on 8 June 2023, at the age of 90.
