= Francisco Lozano =

Mexican cyclist (1932–2008)

Personal information
- Born: 19 May 1932
- Died: 11 November 2008 (aged 76) Mexico City, Mexico

Cycling career
- Sport: Cycling

Francisco Lozano (19 May 1932 – 11 November 2008) was a Mexican cyclist. He competed at the 1952 and 1956 Summer Olympics.
