= Steven Woznick =

American cyclist

Personal information
- Born: October 14, 1949 (age 77) Oakland, California, U.S.
- Height: 5 ft 6 in (168 cm)
- Weight: 79 kg (174 lb)

Cycling career
- Sport: Cycling

Steven Woznick (born October 14, 1949) is a former American cyclist. He competed in the 1000m time trial at the 1972 Summer Olympics. He moved to Peachtree, North Carolina, around 1976.
