= Heriberto Díaz =

Mexican cyclist (born 1942)

Personal information
- Born: 5 January 1942 (age 84) Jocotepec, Mexico

Cycling career
- Sport: Cycling

Heriberto Díaz (born 5 January 1942) is a former Mexican cyclist. He competed at the 1964 Summer Olympics and the 1968 Summer Olympics.
