= José Prieto =

Cuban cyclist

Personal information
- Born: 22 July 1949 (age 77)

Cycling career
- Sport: Cycling

José Prieto (born 22 July 1949) is a Cuban cyclist. He competed in the individual road race at the 1972 Summer Olympics.
