= Jorge Sobrevila =

Argentine cyclist

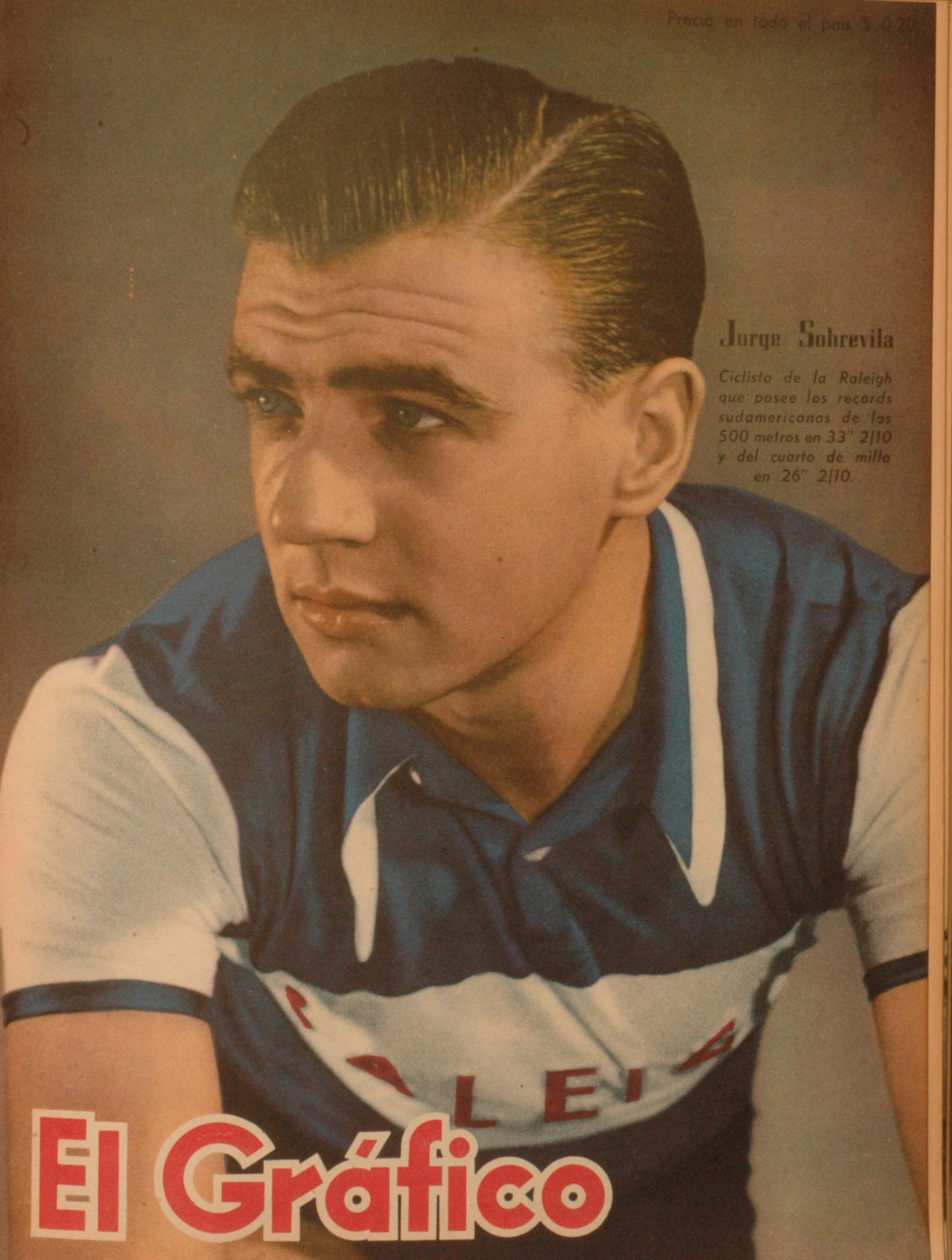

Personal information
- Full name: Jorge Sobrevila
- Born: 26 February 1920

Cycling career
- Sport: Cycling

Jorge Sobrevila (born 26 February 1920, date of death unknown) was an Argentine cyclist. He competed in the time trial event at the 1948 Summer Olympics.
