= Fernando Vera =

Chilean cyclist

Personal information
- Born: 4 February 1954 (age 72) Santiago, Chile

Cycling career
- Sport: Cycling

Fernando Vera (born 4 February 1954) is a Chilean former cyclist. He competed at the 1976 Summer Olympics and the 1984 Summer Olympics.

Vera tested positive for a prohibited substance at the 1983 Pan American Games and was disqualified.
