= Luis Serra =

Uruguayan cyclist

Personal information
- Born: 28 November 1934 San José de Mayo, Uruguay
- Died: 2 October 1992 (aged 57)

Cycling career
- Sport: Cycling

Luis Serra (28 November 1934 – 2 October 1992) was a Uruguayan cyclist. He competed at the 1952, 1956 and 1960 Summer Olympics.
