= Leslie King (cyclist) =

Trinidadian cyclist (1950–2009)

Personal information
- Born: 6 March 1950 San Fernando, Trinidad and Tobago
- Died: 28 October 2009 (aged 59) Mount Hope, Tunapuna-Piarco, Trinidad and Tobago

Cycling career
- Sport: Cycling

Leslie King (6 March 1950 – 28 October 2009) was a Trinidadian cyclist. He competed at the 1968 Summer Olympics and the 1972 Summer Olympics.
