= Clodomiro Cortoni =

Argentine cyclist (1923–2000)

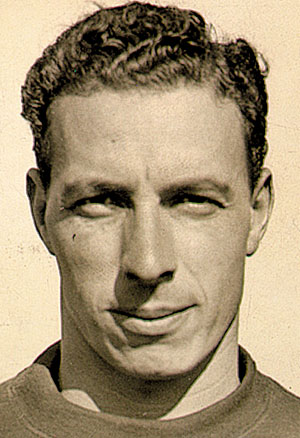

Personal information
- Full name: Clodomiro Cortoni
- Born: 22 June 1923 Pilar, Buenos Aires Province, Argentina
- Died: 3 September 2000 (aged 77) Santa Fe, Argentina

Cycling career
- Sport: Cycling

Clodomiro Cortoni (22 June 1923 – 3 September 2000) was an Argentine cyclist. He competed at the 1948 and 1952 Summer Olympics.
