= Cycling at the 1967 Pan American Games =

This page shows the results of the Cycling Competition at the 1967 Pan American Games, held from July 23 to August 6, 1967 in Winnipeg, Manitoba, Canada. There were a total number of six events, with only men competing.

== Men's competition ==
=== Men's 1.000m Match Sprint (Track) ===
RANK	CYCLIST
1st place, gold medalist(s)	Roger Gibbon (TRI)
2nd place, silver medalist(s)	Oscar García (ARG)
3rd place, bronze medalist(s)	Carl Leusenkamp (USA)

=== Men's 1.000m Time Trial (Track) ===
RANK	CYCLIST
1st place, gold medalist(s)	Roger Gibbon (TRI)
2nd place, silver medalist(s)	Jack Simes (USA)
3rd place, bronze medalist(s)	Carlos Alberto Vázquez (ARG)

=== Men's 4.000m Individual Pursuit (Track) ===
RANK	CYCLIST
1st place, gold medalist(s)	Martín Emilio Rodríguez (COL)
2nd place, silver medalist(s)	Juan Alberto Merlos (ARG)
3rd place, bronze medalist(s)	Radamés Treviño (MEX)

=== Men's 4.000m Team Pursuit (Track) ===
RANK	CYCLIST
1st place, gold medalist(s)	Argentina
2nd place, silver medalist(s)	Mexico
3rd place, bronze medalist(s)	United States; Wes Chowen

=== Men's Individual Race (Road) ===
RANK	CYCLIST
1st place, gold medalist(s)	Marcel Roy (CAN)
2nd place, silver medalist(s)	Vicente Chancay (ARG)
3rd place, bronze medalist(s)	Heriberto Díaz (MEX)

=== Men's Team Time Trial (Road) ===
RANK	CYCLIST
1st place, gold medalist(s)	Argentina
2nd place, silver medalist(s)	Mexico
3rd place, bronze medalist(s)	Colombia
