= Anésio Argenton =

Brazilian cyclist (1931–2011)

Personal information
- Born: 14 March 1931 Boa Esperança do Sul, Brazil
- Died: 3 October 2011 (aged 80) Araraquara, Brazil

Cycling career
- Sport: Cycling

Anésio Argenton (14 March 1931 – 3 October 2011) was a Brazilian cyclist. He competed at the 1956 Summer Olympics and the 1960 Summer Olympics.
