= Cycling at the 1979 Pan American Games =

San Juan, Puerto Rico, was the main host city for the 1979 Pan American Games, but the track cycling events took place about 100 kilometres south, at a velodrome in Coamo. The Coamo velodrome was an outdoor concrete track that didn't have lights. The lack of artificial lighting forced all races to be held in the middle of the day, in the full heat and humidity of the Caribbean summer weather. This page lists the results for men's track cycling and road cycling. There were no women's cycling events at these games.

== Men's track competition ==
=== 1,000-metre Time Trial (July 4) ===
RANK	CYCLIST	TIME
1st place, gold medalist(s)	Gordon Singleton (CAN)	1:07.30
2nd place, silver medalist(s)	David Weller (JAM)	1:08.67
3rd place, bronze medalist(s)	Richard Tormen (CHI)	1:08.83

=== 4,000-metre Individual Pursuit (July 6) ===
RANK	CYCLIST	TIME
1st place, gold medalist(s)	Claude Langlois (CAN)	4:55.718
2nd place, silver medalist(s)	Fernando Vera (CHI)	4:56.915
3rd place, bronze medalist(s)	Juan Rivera (CUB)	5:01.196

=== Scratch Sprint (July 7) ===
RANK	CYCLIST
1st place, gold medalist(s)	Gordon Singleton (CAN)
2nd place, silver medalist(s)	Jesús Pérez (CUB)
3rd place, bronze medalist(s)	Dagoberto Pino (CUB)

=== 4,000-metre Team Pursuit (July 7) ===
RANK	TEAM	TIME
1st place, gold medalist(s)	Chile	4:43.932
2nd place, silver medalist(s)	Cuba	4:45.447
3rd place, bronze medalist(s)	Brazil	4:46.464

== Men's road competition ==
=== Individual Race ===
RANK	CYCLIST
1st place, gold medalist(s)	Carlos Cardet (CUB)
2nd place, silver medalist(s)	Bernardo Colex (MEX)
3rd place, bronze medalist(s)	Gonzalo Marín (COL)

=== Men's Team Time Trial (Road) ===
RANK	CYCLIST
1st place, gold medalist(s)	United States
2nd place, silver medalist(s)	Cuba
3rd place, bronze medalist(s)	Canada

== Medal table ==
Place	Nation	Gold medal	Silver medal	Bronze medal	Total
1	Canada	3	0	1	4
2	Cuba	1	3	2	6
3	Chile	1	1	1	3
4	United States	1	0	0	1
5	Jamaica	0	1	0	1
5	Mexico	0	1	0	1
7	Argentina	0	0	1	1
7	Colombia	0	0	1	1
Total		6	6	6	18
