= Carlos Cardet =

Cuban cyclist (born 1951)

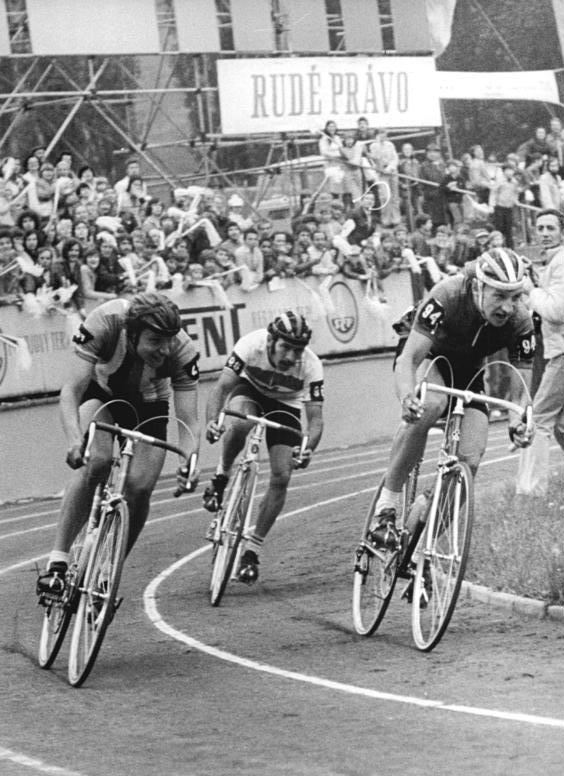

Personal information
- Born: 6 March 1951 (age 75) Havana, Cuba

Cycling career
- Sport: Cycling

Carlos Cardet (born 6 March 1951) is a Cuban former cyclist. He competed at the 1976 Summer Olympics and the 1980 Summer Olympics. In 1978, he won stage five to Karlovy Vary in the Peace Race, an important amateur race of the era.
