= 2004 Vuelta Ciclista de Chile =

Race details
- Dates: March 11–21
- Stages: 11
- Distance: 1,366 km (848.8 mi)
- Winning time: 32h 22' 45"

Results
	Winner	Marco Arriagada (CHI)	(Publiguías)
	Second	José Medina (CHI)	(Ace Bryc Curicó)
	Third	Marcelo Arriagada (CHI)	(Publiguías)
	Points	Edgardo Simón (ARG)	(Líder-La Polar)
	Mountains	Marco Arriagada (CHI)	(Publiguías)
	Team	Orbitel Colombia	

The 27th edition of the Vuelta Ciclista de Chile was held from March 11 to March 21, 2004.

== Stages ==
=== 2004-03-11: Lota — Concepción (35 km) ===
Place	Stage 1 – Team Time Trial		General Classification	
Place	Name	Time	Name	Time
1.	Ace Bryc Curicó	48.44	Enzo Cesario (CHI)	48.44
2.	Publiguías	+0.15	José Medina (CHI)	—
3.	Líder-La Polar	+0.40	Arturo Corvalán (CHI)	—

=== 2004-03-12: Concepción — Chillán (117 km) ===
Place	Stage 2		General Classification	
Place	Name	Time	Name	Time
1.	Arturo Corvalán (CHI)	2:42.50	Arturo Corvalán (CHI)	3:31.34
2.	Enzo Cesario (CHI)	+0.04	Enzo Cesario (CHI)	+0.04
3.	Edgardo Simón (ARG)	+0.06	José Medina (CHI)	+0.10

=== 2004-03-13: San Nicolás — Talca (197 km) ===
Place	Stage 3		General Classification	
Place	Name	Time	Name	Time
1.	Arturo Corvalán (CHI)	4:59.19	Arturo Corvalán (CHI)	8:32.47
2.	Pedro Lópes (POR)	—	José Medina (CHI)	+0.20
3.	Edgardo Simón (ARG)	—	Luis Sepúlveda (CHI)	+0.20

=== 2004-03-14: Talca — Curepto (77 km) ===
Place	Stage 4-A		General Classification	
Place	Name	Time	Name	Time
1.	Enzo Cesario (CHI)	1:49.51	Arturo Corvalán (CHI)	10:22.38
2.	Pedro Miranda (CHI)	—	José Medina (CHI)	+0.20
3.	David Muñoz (ESP)	—	Luis Sepúlveda (CHI)	+0.20

=== 2004-03-14: Hualañé — Curicó (90 km) ===
Place	Stage 4-B		General Classification	
Place	Name	Time	Name	Time
1.	Edgardo Simón (ARG)	2:10.47	Arturo Corvalán (CHI)	13:31.27
2.	Arturo Corvalán (CHI)	—	Juan Fierro (CHI)	+0.25
3.	Pedro Miranda (CHI)	—	José Medina (CHI)	+0.26

=== 2004-03-15: Curicó — Pichilemu (150 km) ===
Place	Stage 5		General Classification	
Place	Name	Time	Name	Time
1.	Raúl López (CHI)	3:31.31	Néstor Pías (URU)	16:05.36
2.	Néstor Pías (URU)	—	Juan Fierro (CHI)	+7.07
3.	Rodrigo Berrios (CHI)	+3.50	Luis Sepúlveda (CHI)	+7.07

=== 2004-03-16: Cruce La Rosa — La Estrella (21 km) ===
Place	Stage 6-A Individual Time Trial		General Classification	
Place	Name	Time	Name	Time
1.	Edgardo Simón (ARG)	25.00		
2.	Gonzalo Miranda (CHI)	+0.16		
3.	José Medina (CHI)	+0.17		

=== 2004-03-16: La Estrella — Algarrobo (146 km) ===
Place	Stage 6-B		General Classification	
Place	Name	Time	Name	Time
1.	Andrei Sartassov (RUS)	3:16.40	José Medina (CHI)	19:54.21
2.	Francisco Cabrera (CHI)	—	Edgardo Simón (ARG)	+0.09
3.	Arturo Corvalán (CHI)	+0.04	Marco Arriagada (CHI)	+0.22

=== 2004-03-17: Algarrobo — Villa Alemana (105 km) ===
Place	Stage 7		General Classification	
Place	Name	Time	Name	Time
1.	Luis Sepúlveda (CHI)	2:17.26	Luis Sepúlveda (CHI)	22:12.19
2.	Marco Arriagada (CHI)	+0.04	Marco Arriagada (CHI)	+0.40
3.	Andrei Sartassov (RUS)	+0.06	Gonzalo Salas (ARG)	+0.46

=== 2004-03-18: Olmué — Los Andes (122 km) ===
Place	Stage 8		General Classification	
Place	Name	Time	Name	Time
1.	Edgardo Simón (ARG)	3:02.49	Edgardo Simón (ARG)	25:15.47
2.	Javier Zapata (COL)	—	José Medina (CHI)	+0.02
3.	José Medina (CHI)	—	Marcelo Arriagada (CHI)	+0.11

=== 2004-03-19: Los Andes — Portillo (115 km) ===
Place	Stage 9		General Classification	
Place	Name	Time	Name	Time
1.	Marco Arriagada (CHI)	3:02.53	Marco Arriagada (CHI)	28:19.10
2.	José Medina (CHI)	+0.16	José Medina (CHI)	+0.50
3.	Julio César Rangel (COL)	+1.28	Marcelo Arriagada (CHI)	+1.23

=== 2004-03-20: Pirque — Pirque (131 km) ===
Place	Stage 10		General Classification	
Place	Name	Time	Name	Time
1.	Gonzalo Miranda (CHI)	2:50.46	Marco Arriagada (CHI)	31:10.06
2.	Arturo Corvalán (CHI)	+0.04	José Medina (CHI)	+0.50
3.	Edgardo Simón (ARG)	+0.06	Marcelo Arriagada (CHI)	+1.23

=== 2004-03-21: Santiago — Santiago (60 km) ===
Place	Stage 11		General Classification	
Place	Name	Time	Name	Time
1.	Arturo Corvalán (CHI)	1:12.39	Marco Arriagada (CHI)	32:22.45
2.	Gonzalo Miranda (CHI)	—	José Medina (CHI)	+0.50
3.	Edgardo Simón (ARG)	—	Marcelo Arriagada (CHI)	+1.23

== Final classification ==
RANK	CYCLIST	TEAM	TIME
1.	Marco Arriagada (CHI)	Publiguías	32:22:45
2.	José Medina (CHI)	ACE Bryc Curicó	+ 0.50
3.	Marcelo Arriagada (CHI)	Publiguías	+ 1.23
4.	Gonzalo Salas (ARG)	Líder-La Polar	+ 1.29
5.	Hernán Darío Muñoz (COL)	Orbitel Colombia	+ 1.35
6.	Jairo Hernández (COL)	Orbitel Colombia	+ 3.43
7.	Javier Zapata (COL)	Orbitel Colombia	+ 3.49
8.	Heberth Gutiérrez (COL)	Orbitel Colombia	+ 3.50
9.	Edgardo Simón (ARG)	Líder-La Polar	+ 4.11
10.	Iván Parra (COL)	Comunidad Valenciana-Kelme	+ 4.19

== Teams ==
Publiguías

1. (Chile) Marco Arriagada
2. (Argentina) Jorge Giacinti
3. (Chile) Marcelo Arriagada
4. (Chile) Richard Rodríguez
5. (Chile) Gonzalo Miranda
6. (Argentina) Pedro Prieto

Ace Bryc Curicó

7. (Chile) Luis Sepúlveda
8. (Chile) José Medina
9. (Chile) Arturo Corvalán
10. (Chile) Enzo Cesario
11. (Chile) Juan Fierro
12. (Colombia) Elder Herrera

Skippi – Doñihue

13. (Russia) Andrei Sartassov
14. (Argentina) Marcelo Agüero
15. (Chile) Carlos Oyarzún
16. (Chile) Cristóbal Silva
17. (Chile) Aliro Catejo
18. (Chile) Cristián Rosas

Kazachstan National Team

19. (Kazakhstan) Maxim Iglinsky
20. (Kazakhstan) Assan Bazayev
21. (Kazakhstan) Valeriy Dmitriyev
22. (Kazakhstan) Kairat Baigudinov
23. (Kazakhstan) Andrey Medyannikov
24. (Kazakhstan) Vadim Gorbachevsky

Comunidad Valenciana-Kelme

25. (Spain) David Muñoz
26. (Spain) Javier Cherro
27. (Spain) Antonio Olmo
28. (Spain) Vicente Ballester
29. (Colombia) Iván Parra
30. (Spain) José Luis Martínez

L.A Pecol

31. (Portugal) Pedro Lópes
32. (Chile) Pedro Andrade
33. (Chile) Luís Pinheiro
34. (Spain) David Arroyo

Lascar-Peñaflor

37. (Chile) Alexis Arias
38. (Chile) Miguel Parraguez
39. (Chile) Raúl López
40. (Chile) Jaime Carreño
41. (Chile) Sergio Abarca
42. (Chile) Patricio Taulis

Líder-La Polar

43. (Chile) Gonzalo Garrido
44. (Chile) Francisco Cabrera
45. (Chile) Jaime Bretti
46. (Chile) Antonio Cabrera
47. (Argentina) Gonzalo Salas
48. (Argentina) Edgardo Simón

Miche

49. (Russia) Alexander Bespalov
50. (Chile) Fabio Borghesi
51. (Hungary) Balasz Rohtmer
52. (Chile) Leonardo Caneschi
53. (Chile) Maximiliano Martella
54. (Chile) Alberto Tacconi

Multihogar Curicó

55. (Chile) Miguel Quitral
56. (Chile) José Manuel Aravena
57. (Chile) Cristián Medina
58. (Chile) Ramón Carreño
59. (Colombia) Edilberto Suárez

Orbitel Colombia

61. (Colombia) Hernán Bonilla
62. (Colombia) Jairo Hernández
63. (Colombia) Jorge Martínez
64. (Colombia) Heberth Gutiérrez
65. (Colombia) Hernán Darío Muñoz
66. (Colombia) Javier Zapata

Quinta Normal

67. (Chile) Manuel Miranda
68. (Chile) Fernando Gatica
69. (Chile) Claudio Cornejo
70. (Chile) Rodrigo Berríos
71. (Chile) Reynaldo Cortes

Uruguay National Team

73. (Uruguay) Hernán Cline
74. (Uruguay) Richard Mascaraña
75. (Uruguay) Néstor Pías
76. (Uruguay) Ricardo Guedes
77. (Uruguay) Daniel Fuentes
78. (Uruguay) Wilder Miraballes

Transportes Romero

79. (Chile) Daniel Bretti
80. (Chile) César Doussang
81. (Chile) Pablo González
82. (Chile) Patricio Almonacid
83. (Colombia) Julio César Rangel
84. (Chile) Raúl Ruarte

UPMC American Cycling Team

85. (Argentina) Alejandro Acton
86. (United States) Joseph M. Papp
87. (Uruguay) Gerardo Castro
88. (Uruguay) Mateo Sasso
89. (Uruguay) Álvaro Tardaguita
90. (United States) Eneas Freyre

Nacimiento

91. (Chile) Gerson Zúñiga
92. (Chile) Rodrigo Zúñiga
93. (Chile) Pablo Valenzuela
94. (Chile) César Oliva
95. (Chile) Álvaro Pino
96. (Chile) Carlos Villarreal

Asociación de Concepción

97. (Chile) Sven Harms
98. (Chile) Francisco Pino
99. (Chile) Lorenzo Torres
100. (Chile) Marcelo Sandoval
101. (Chile) Daniel Torres
102. (Chile) Cristian Vera
