= 2003 Vuelta Ciclista de Chile =

Race details
- Dates: March 27 – April 5
- Stages: 12
- Distance: 1,496.5 km (929.9 mi)
- Winning time: 34h 40' 57"

Results
| | Winner | Marco Arriagada (CHI) | (Publiguías) |
| | Second | José Medina (CHI) | (Ace Bryc Curicó) |
| | Third | Jorge Giacinti (ARG) | (Publiguías) |
| | Points | Francisco Cabrera (CHI) | (Ekono Alamo Rent A) |
| | Mountains | José Medina (CHI) | (Ace Bryc Curicó) |
| | Team | Publiguías | |

The 26th edition of the Vuelta Ciclista de Chile was held from March 27 to April 5, 2003.

== Stages ==
=== 2003-03-27: Concepción — Concepción (4.5 km) ===
| Place | Prologue | | General Classification | |
| Place | Name | Time | Name | Time |
|---|---|---|---|---|
| 1. | Edgardo Simón (ARG) | 5.17 | Edgardo Simón (ARG) | 5.17 |
| 2. | Enzo Cesario (CHI) | +0.09 | Enzo Cesario (CHI) | +0.09 |
| 3. | Alejandro Acton (ARG) | +0.09 | Alejandro Acton (ARG) | +0.09 |

=== 2003-03-28: San Pedro de La Paz — Chillán (135 km) ===
| Place | Stage 1 | | General Classification | |
| Place | Name | Time | Name | Time |
|---|---|---|---|---|
| 1. | Edgardo Simón (ARG) | 2:49.49 | Edgardo Simón (ARG) | 2:54.56 |
| 2. | Francisco Cabrera (CHI) | — | Francisco Cabrera (CHI) | +0.19 |
| 3. | José Aravena (CHI) | — | Enzo Cesario (CHI) | +0.19 |

=== 2003-03-29: Chillán — Linares (211 km) ===
| Place | Stage 2 | | General Classification | |
| Place | Name | Time | Name | Time |
|---|---|---|---|---|
| 1. | Francisco Cabrera (CHI) | 5:07.20 | Edgardo Simón (ARG) | 8:02.13 |
| 2. | Darío Ramírez (ARG) | — | Francisco Cabrera (CHI) | +0.06 |
| 3. | Gonzalo Miranda (CHI) | — | Gonzalo Miranda (CHI) | +0.18 |

=== 2003-03-30: Linares — Talca (122 km) ===
| Place | Stage 3-A | | General Classification | |
| Place | Name | Time | Name | Time |
|---|---|---|---|---|
| 1. | Richard Rodríguez (CHI) | 2:51.67 | Edgardo Simón (ARG) | 10:54.05 |
| 2. | Edgardo Simón (ARG) | — | Francisco Cabrera (CHI) | +0.12 |
| 3. | Ángel Pérez (CHI) | — | Gonzalo Miranda (CHI) | +0.24 |

=== 2003-03-30: Talca — Pencahue (20 km) ===
| Place | Stage 3-B – Individual Time Trial | | General Classification | |
| Place | Name | Time | Name | Time |
|---|---|---|---|---|
| 1. | Edgardo Simón (ARG) | 21.04 | Edgardo Simón (ARG) | 11:15.09 |
| 2. | Marco Arriagada (CHI) | +0.02 | Marco Arriagada (CHI) | +0.30 |
| 3. | Gonzalo Salas (ARG) | +0.11 | Gonzalo Salas (ARG) | +0.47 |

=== 2003-03-31: Talca — Licante (70 km) ===
| Place | Stage 4-A | | General Classification | |
| Place | Name | Time | Name | Time |
|---|---|---|---|---|
| 1. | José Medina (CHI) | 1:49.57 | Edgardo Simón (ARG) | 13:05.04 |
| 2. | Richard Rodríguez (CHI) | — | Marco Arriagada (CHI) | +0.32 |
| 3. | Francisco Cabrera (CHI) | — | Gonzalo Salas (ARG) | +0.49 |

=== 2003-03-31: Licante — Curicó (120 km) ===
| Place | Stage 4-B | | General Classification | |
| Place | Name | Time | Name | Time |
|---|---|---|---|---|
| 1. | Richard Rodríguez (CHI) | 2:48.43 | Edgardo Simón (ARG) | 15:53.40 |
| 2. | Edgardo Simón (ARG) | — | Marco Arriagada (CHI) | +0.39 |
| 3. | Francisco Cabrera (CHI) | — | Gonzalo Salas (ARG) | +0.56 |

=== 2003-04-01: Curicó — Pichilemu (160 km) ===
| Place | Stage 5 | | General Classification | |
| Place | Name | Time | Name | Time |
|---|---|---|---|---|
| 1. | Harm Jansen (NED) | 4:02.26 | Edgardo Simón (ARG) | 20:02.54 |
| 2. | Cory Lange (CAN) | +0.02 | Marco Arriagada (CHI) | +0.39 |
| 3. | Pablo Valenzuela (CHI) | +4.56 | Gonzalo Salas (ARG) | +0.56 |

=== 2003-04-02: Pichilemu — San Antonio (140 km) ===
| Place | Stage 6 | | General Classification | |
| Place | Name | Time | Name | Time |
|---|---|---|---|---|
| 1. | Alejandro Acton (ARG) | 3:33.25 | Edgardo Simón (ARG) | 23:36.18 |
| 2. | Edgardo Simón (ARG) | +0.05 | Marco Arriagada (CHI) | +0.45 |
| 3. | Richard Rodríguez (CHI) | +0.05 | Gonzalo Salas (ARG) | +1.02 |

=== 2003-04-03: Melipilla — Farellones (125 km) ===
| Place | Stage 7 | | General Classification | |
| Place | Name | Time | Name | Time |
|---|---|---|---|---|
| 1. | Marco Arriagada (CHI) | 3:26.58 | Marco Arriagada (CHI) | 27:03.46 |
| 2. | Jorge Giacinti (ARG) | +0.05 | Jorge Giacinti (ARG) | +0.25 |
| 3. | José Medina (CHI) | +0.03 | Edgardo Simón (ARG) | +0.29 |

=== 2003-04-04: Limache — Limache (128 km) ===
| Place | Stage 8 | | General Classification | |
| Place | Name | Time | Name | Time |
|---|---|---|---|---|
| 1. | Edgardo Simón (ARG) | 2:58.58 | Marco Arriagada (CHI) | 30:02.43 |
| 2. | Richard Rodríguez (CHI) | — | Edgardo Simón (ARG) | +0.13 |
| 3. | Enzo Cesario (CHI) | — | Jorge Giacinti (ARG) | +0.26 |

=== 2003-04-05: Quilpué — Quilicura (190 km) ===
| Place | Stage 9 | | General Classification | |
| Place | Name | Time | Name | Time |
|---|---|---|---|---|
| 1. | José Medina (CHI) | 3:07.05 | Marco Arriagada (CHI) | 33:09.40 |
| 2. | Marco Arriagada (CHI) | — | José Medina (CHI) | +0.27 |
| 3. | Jorge Giacinti (ARG) | +0.04 | Jorge Giacinti (ARG) | +0.33 |

=== 2003-04-06: Santiago — Santiago (71.4 km) ===
| Place | Stage 10 | | General Classification | |
| Place | Name | Time | Name | Time |
|---|---|---|---|---|
| 1. | Richard Rodríguez (CHI) | 1:31.17 | Marco Arriagada (CHI) | 34:40.57 |
| 2. | Edgardo Simón (ARG) | — | José Medina (CHI) | +0.27 |
| 3. | Enzo Cesario (CHI) | — | Jorge Giacinti (ARG) | +0.33 |

== Final classification ==
| RANK | CYCLIST | TEAM | TIME |
|---|---|---|---|
| 1. | Marco Arriagada (CHI) | Publiguías | 34:40:57 |
| 2. | José Medina (CHI) | ACE Bryc Curicó | + 0.27 |
| 3. | Jorge Giacinti (ARG) | Publiguías | + 0.33 |
| 4. | Edgardo Simón (ARG) | Ekono Alamo Rent A | + 1.30 |
| 5. | Gonzalo Salas (ARG) | Lider Trek Bio-Bio | + 2.10 |
| 6. | Luis Fernando Sepúlveda (CHI) | ACE Bryc Curicó | + 2.39 |
| 7. | Marcelo Agüero (ARG) | Ekono Alamo Rent A | + 3.02 |
| 8. | Pedro Prieto (ARG) | Publiguías | + 3.46 |
| 9. | Raúl Gómez (COL) | Transportes Romero | + 4.39 |
| 10. | Richard Rodríguez (CHI) | Publiguías | + 5.26 |

== Teams ==
Lider Trek Bio-Bio

1. (Argentina) Gonzalo Salas
2. (Chile) Marcelo Sandoval
3. (Chile) Victor Garrido
4. (Chile) Gonzalo Garrido
5. (Russia) Andrei Sartassov
6. (Chile) Juan Fierro

Alas Rojas

7. (Argentina) Alejandro Acton
8. (Uruguay) Néstor Pías
9. (Chile) Richard Mascaraña
10. (Chile) Alen Reyes
11. (Chile) Agustín Margalef
12. (Colombia) Hernán Cline

Ace Byrc Curico

13. (Chile) José Medina
14. (Chile) Luis Fernando Sepúlveda
15. (Colombia) Nélson Vargas
16. (Chile) Raúl López
17. (Chile) Miguel Parraguez
18. (Chile) Enzo Cesario

Brazil National Team

19. (Brazil) Márcio May
20. (Brazil) Hernandes Cuadri
21. (Brazil) Rudrigo Brito
22. (Brazil) Renato Rosler
23. (Brazil) Suelito Gohr
24. (Brazil) Antonio Nascimento

Doñihue

25. (Chile) Aliro Catejo
26. (Chile) Rodrigo Barrios
27. (Chile) Alejandro Solís
28. (Chile) Hector Osorio
29. (Chile) Felipe Ramírez
30. (Chile) César Doussang

Colavita Bolla

31. (United States) Shawn Wilard
32. (United States) Eddy Hilger
33. (United States) Josh Seldman
34. (United States) Peter Fairbanks
35. (United States) Muricio Jacomo

Ekono Alamo Rent A

37. (Argentina) Edgardo Simón
38. (Argentina) Marcelo Agüero
39. (Chile) Francisco Cabrera
40. (Chile) Antonio Cabrera
41. (Chile) Jaime Bretti
42. (Chile) Ángel Pérez

Marco Polo

43. (Mongolia) Jamsram Ulzii
44. (United States) Michael Carter
45. (Germany) Kay Karner
46. (New Zealand) Nathan Dahlberg
47. (Canada) Cory Lange
48. (Germany) Felix Rohrbach

La Polar

49. (Uruguay) Milton Wynants
50. (Argentina) Ezequiel Romero
51. (Chile) Cristobal Silva
52. (Chile) José Labra
53. (Chile) Clauss Plaut
54. (Chile) Cristian Fierro

Trust House

55. (Australia) Baden Burke
56. (Australia) Andrew Small
57. (Australia) Tim Wilson
58. (Australia) Gregory Saw
59. (Netherlands) Pelle Kil
60. (Netherlands) Harm Jansen

Agua Mineral Rari

61. (Chile) Joaquín Jorquera
62. (Chile) Manuel Abarca
63. (Chile) José Aravena
64. (Argentina) Darío Ramírez
65. (Colombia) Cristian Medina
66. (Argentina) Facundo Bazzi

UPMC-La Polar

67. (United States) Todd Herriott
68. (United States) Joseph M. Papp
69. (Uruguay) Gerardo Castro
70. (Uruguay) Mateo Sasso
71. (Uruguay) Alvaro Tardáguila
72. (Colombia) César Grajales

Peñaflor Lascar

73. (Chile) Jonathan Alvarado
74. (Chile) Rodrigo Pérez
75. (Chile) Alexis Arias
76. (Chile) Jaime Carreño
77. (Chile) Andrés Taulis
78. (Chile) Sergio Abarca

Venezuela National Team

79. (Venezuela) Franklin Chacón
80. (Venezuela) Manuel Medina
81. (Venezuela) Víctor Becerra
82. (Venezuela) Carlos José Ochoa
83. (Venezuela) Ronald Gonzales
84. (Venezuela) Deivis Urdaneta

Publiguías

85. (Argentina) Pedro Prieto
86. (Argentina) Jorge Giacinti
87. (Chile) Marco Arriagada
88. (Chile) Marcelo Arriagada
89. (Chile) Richard Rodríguez
90. (Chile) Gonzalo Miranda

Transportes Romero

91. (Colombia) Luis Espinosa
92. (Colombia) Raúl Gómez
93. (Chile) Pablo Riveros
94. (Chile) Cristian Rosas
95. (Chile) Marcelo Olivares
96. (Chile) Reinaldo Cortes

Vinci Los Angeles

97. (Chile) Pablo Syll
98. (Chile) Manuel González
99. (Chile) Pablo Valenzuela
100. (Chile) César Valenzuela
101. (Chile) Gustavo Carvacho
102. (Chile) Daniel Bretti
