= 2005 Vuelta Ciclista de Chile =

Race details
- Dates: March 27 – April 3
- Stages: 7
- Distance: 861 km (535.0 mi)
- Winning time: 21h 28' 41"

Results
	Winner	Edgardo Simón (ARG)	(Líder)
	Second	Gonzalo Salas (ARG)	(Líder)
	Third	Marco Arriagada (CHI)	(Líder)
	Mountains	Marco Arriagada (CHI)	(Líder)
	Sprints	Arturo Corvalán (CHI)	(Glassex-Bryc-Ace-Curico)
	Team	Líder	

The 28th edition of the Vuelta Ciclista de Chile was held from March 27 to April 3, 2005.

== Stages ==
=== 2005-03-27: Talca—Talca (4 km) ===
Place	Prologue		General Classification	
Place	Name	Time	Name	Time
1.	Edgardo Simón (ARG)	4.24	Edgardo Simón (ARG)	4.24
2.	Gonzalo Salas (ARG)	+0.07	Gonzalo Salas (ARG)	+0.07
3.	Andrei Sartassov (RUS)	+0.11	Andrei Sartassov (RUS)	+0.11

=== 2005-03-28: Talca—Curicó (169 km) ===
Place	Stage 1-A		General Classification	
Place	Name	Time	Name	Time
1.	Arturo Corvalán (CHI)	3:36.21	Edgardo Simón (ARG)	3:40.41
2.	Edgardo Simón (ARG)	—	Gonzalo Salas (ARG)	+0.10
3.	Francisco Cabrera (CHI)	—	Andrei Sartassov (RUS)	+0.15

=== 2005-03-28: Curicó—Curicó (20 km) ===
Place	Stage 1-B – Individual Time Trial		General Classification	
Place	Name	Time	Name	Time
1.	Edgardo Simón (ARG)	25.29	Edgardo Simón (ARG)	4:06.10
2.	Matías Médici (ARG)	+0.42	Matías Médici (ARG)	+1.01
3.	José Medina (CHI)	+0.43	José Medina (CHI)	+1.01

=== 2005-03-29: Curicó—Rancagua (165 km) ===
Place	Stage 2		General Classification	
Place	Name	Time	Name	Time
1.	Richard Rodríguez (CHI)	3:50.28	Gabriel Brizuela (ARG)	7:58.34
2.	Jaime Bretti (CHI)	—	José Aravena (CHI)	+0.06
3.	Rui Sousa (POR)	—	Gonzalo Salas (ARG)	+0.12

=== 2005-03-30: Ascenso—Farellones (51 km) ===
Place	Stage 3		General Classification	
Place	Name	Time	Name	Time
1.	Marco Arriagada (CHI)	1:38.10	Gonzalo Salas (ARG)	9:37.34
2.	José Medina (CHI)	+0.07	Gabriel Brizuela (ARG)	+1.18
3.	Gonzalo Salas (ARG)	+0.41	Andrei Sartassov (RUS)	+1.52

=== 2005-03-31: Santiago—Algarrobo (160 km) ===
Place	Stage 4		General Classification	
Place	Name	Time	Name	Time
1.	Edgardo Simón (ARG)	3:24.57	Gonzalo Salas (ARG)	13:02.33
2.	Enzo Cesario (CHI)	+0.02	Gabriel Brizuela (ARG)	+1.18
3.	Assan Bazayev (KAZ)	+0.02	Andrei Sartassov (RUS)	+1.52

=== 2005-04-01: Algarrobo—Villa Alemana (150 km) ===
Place	Stage 5		General Classification	
Place	Name	Time	Name	Time
1.	Enzo Cesario (CHI)	3:37.15	Gonzalo Salas (ARG)	16:39.48
2.	Richard Rodríguez (CHI)	—	Gabriel Brizuela (ARG)	+1.18
3.	Francisco Cabrera (CHI)	—	Richard Rodríguez (CHI)	+1.46

=== 2005-04-02: Villa Alemana—Los Andes (150 km) ===
Place	Stage 6		General Classification	
Place	Name	Time	Name	Time
1.	Marco Arriagada (CHI)	3:09.08	Edgardo Simón (ARG)	19:53.06
2.	Edgardo Simón (ARG)	—	Gonzalo Salas (ARG)	+0.12
3.	Gonzalo Garrido (CHI)	+4.19	Marco Arriagada (CHI)	+0.39

=== 2005-04-02: Santiago ("Circuita") (60 km) ===
Place	Stage 7		General Classification	
Place	Name	Time	Name	Time
1.	Arturo Corvalán (CHI)	1:35.37	Edgardo Simón (ARG)	21:28.41
2.	Francisco Cabrera (CHI)	—	Gonzalo Salas (ARG)	+0.14
3.	Gonzalo Miranda (CHI)	—	Marco Arriagada (CHI)	+0.41

== Final classification ==
RANK	CYCLIST	TEAM	TIME
1.	Edgardo Simón (ARG)	Líder	21:28:41
2.	Gonzalo Salas (ARG)	Líder	+ 0.14
3.	Marco Arriagada (CHI)	Líder	+ 0.41
4.	Gabriel Brizuela (ARG)	Amaru Argentina	+ 1.32
5.	Andrei Sartassov (RUS)	O.G.M	+ 2.06
6.	Francisco Cabrera (CHI)	Líder	+ 2.50
7.	Richard Rodríguez (CHI)	Publiguías	+ 2.59
8.	Gonzalo Miranda (CHI)	Publiguías	+ 3.33
9.	Rui Sousa (POR)	L.A.Aluminios – Liberty Seguros	+ 3.57
10.	Marcelo Arriagada (CHI)	Publiguías	+ 4.08

== Teams ==
Líder

1. (Chile) Marco Arriagada
2. (Argentina) Edgardo Simón
3. (Chile) Francisco Cabrera
4. (Chile) Jaime Bretti
5. (Chile) Gonzalo Garrido
6. (Argentina) Gonzalo Salas

L.A.Aluminios – Liberty Seguros

7. (Portugal) Rui Sousa
8. (Spain) David García
9. (Portugal) Pedro Andrade
10. (Portugal) Gilberto Martins
11. (Spain) Carlos Nozal
12. (Spain) Jordi Grau

Glassex-Bryc-Ace-Curico

13. (Chile) Arturo Corvalán
14. (Chile) José Medina
15. (Chile) Luis Sepúlveda
16. (Chile) Enzo Cesario
17. (Chile) Juan Fierro
18. (Chile) Pablo González

Venezuela National Team

19. (Venezuela) José Chacón Díaz
20. (Venezuela) Manuel Guevara
21. (Venezuela) Carlos Ochoa
22. (Venezuela) Carlos Maya
23. (Venezuela) Manuel Medina
24. (Venezuela) Ronald González

Publiguías Sport Club Trentin

25. (Chile) Richard Rodríguez
26. (Chile) Gonzalo Miranda
27. (Chile) César Doussang
28. (Chile) Daniel Bretti
29. (Chile) Marcelo Arriagada
30. (Chile) Carlos Oyarzun

Argentina National Team

32. (Argentina) Federico Folgaral
33. (Argentina) Matías Médici
34. (Argentina) Juan Pablo Dotti
35. (Argentina) Emanuel Saldaño

Multihogar-M.A.G.-Curico

37. (Chile) José Aravena
38. (Chile) José Parraguez
39. (Chile) Rubén González
40. (Chile) Julio Gómez
41. (Chile) Gerardo Castro
42. (Chile) Luis Mansilla

Kazakhstan National Team

43. (Kazakhstan) Alexandr Dymovskikh
44. (Kazakhstan) Assan Bazayev
45. (Kazakhstan) Kairat Baygudiniv
46. (Kazakhstan) Alexsandr Dyachenko
47. (Kazakhstan) Andrey Zeits
48. (Kazakhstan) Sergey Danniker

Asociacion Ciclismo Talca

49. (Chile) Jonathan Alvarado
50. (Chile) Patricio Jorquera
51. (Chile) Marcelo Valenzuela
52. (Chile) Alejandro Valenzuela
53. (Chile) Juan Alvarado
54. (Chile) Pablo Valenzuela

Extra Suzano Brasil

55. (Brazil) Andre Grizante
56. (Brazil) Renato Ruiz
57. (Brazil) Renato Rohsler
58. (Brazil) Tiago Fiorilli
59. (Brazil) Patrique Azevedo
60. (Brazil) José Santos

O.G.M

61. (Russia) Andrei Sartassov
62. (Chile) Antonio Cabrera
63. (Chile) Claus Plaut
64. (Chile) Cristobal Silva
65. (Chile) Cristobal Gomez
66. (Chile) Robinson Nuñez

Amaru Argentina

67. (Argentina) Juan Aguirre
68. (Argentina) Osvaldo Fronssasco
69. (Argentina) Gabriel Brizuela
70. (Argentina) Javier Moressi
71. (Argentina) Jorge Cornejo
72. (Argentina) Sebastian Alexandre

Club Ciclista Ñielol-Municipal

73. (Chile) Alvaro Alvarez
74. (Chile) Danilo Olmazabal
75. (Chile) San Martin Francisco
76. (Chile) Victor Carcamo
77. (Chile) Jorge Contreras
78. (Chile) César Mardones

Quinta Normal Keller-Dimar

85. (Chile) Rodrigo Berrios
86. (Chile) Boris Campos
87. (Chile) Claudio Cornejo
88. (Chile) Labra José
89. (Chile) Nicodemus Verdugo
90. (Chile) Álvaro Pino

Lascar Peñaflor

91. (Chile) Sergio Abarca
92. (Chile) Raúl López
93. (Chile) Patricio Taulis
94. (Chile) Alexis Arias
95. (Chile) Patricio Almonacid
96. (Chile) Jaime Carreño

Cannondale

97. (Chile) César Vasquez
98. (Chile) César Oliva
99. (Chile) Gino Urrutia
100. (Chile) Ricardo Paredes
101. (Chile) Francisco Corvalán
