= 2006 Vuelta Ciclista de Chile =

Race details
- Dates: May 4–15
- Stages: 10
- Distance: 1,424.5 km (885.1 mi)
- Winning time: 32h 50' 49"

Results
	Winner	Andrei Sartassov (RUS)	(Líder)
	Second	Jorge Giacinti (ARG)	(Relax)
	Third	Luis Sepúlveda (CHI)	(Glassex Bryc Curicó)
	Points	Arturo Corvalán (CHI)	(Glassex Bryc Curicó)
	Mountains	Enzo Cesario (CHI)	(Glassex Bryc Curicó)
	Sprints	Enzo Cesario (CHI)	(Glassex Bryc Curicó)
	Team	Glassex Bryc Curicó	

The 29th edition of the Vuelta Ciclista de Chile was held from May 4 to May 14, 2006.

== Stages ==
=== 2006-05-04: Coquimbo — Coquimbo (2 km) ===
Place	Prologue		General Classification	
Place	Name	Time	Name	Time
1.	Matías Médici (ARG)	0:08.17	Matías Médici (ARG)	0:08.17
2.	Andrei Sartassov (RUS)	+0.07	Andrei Sartassov (RUS)	+0.07
3.	Jorge Giacinti (ARG)	+0.10	Jorge Giacinti (ARG)	+0.10

=== 2006-05-05: Coquimbo — La Serena (120 km) ===
Place	Stage 1		General Classification	
Place	Name	Time	Name	Time
1.	Arturo Corvalán (CHI)	2:54.58	Matías Médici (ARG)	3:03.15
2.	Luis Mancilla (CHI)	—	Andrei Sartassov (RUS)	+0.07
3.	Francisco Cabrera (CHI)	—	Jorge Giacinti (ARG)	+0.10

=== 2006-05-06: La Serena — Ovalle (110 km) ===
Place	Stage 2		General Classification	
Place	Name	Time	Name	Time
1.	Marco Arriagada (CHI)	2:44.42	Andrei Sartassov (RUS)	5:48.00
2.	Jorge Giacinti (ARG)	—	Jorge Giacinti (ARG)	+0.01
3.	Andrei Sartassov (RUS)	—	Marco Arriagada (CHI)	+0.10

=== 2006-05-07: La Ligua — San Esteban (182.5 km) ===
Place	Stage 3		General Classification	
Place	Name	Time	Name	Time
1.	Andrei Sartassov (RUS)	4:43.40	Andrei Sartassov (RUS)	10:31.30
2.	Enzo Cesario (CHI)	—	Jorge Giacinti (ARG)	+0.11
3.	Luis Sepúlveda (CHI)	—	Marco Arriagada (CHI)	+0.20

=== 2006-05-08: Villa Alemana — Valparaíso (150 km) ===
Place	Stage 4-A		General Classification	
Place	Name	Time	Name	Time
1.	Gonzalo Miranda (CHI)	2:02.09	Andrei Sartassov (RUS)	12:33.39
2.	Walter Pérez (URU)	—	Jorge Giacinti (ARG)	+0.11
3.	Francisco Cabrera (CHI)	—	Marco Arriagada (CHI)	+0.20

=== 2006-05-08: Valparaíso — Patrimonio de la Humanidad (57.4 km) ===
Place	Stage 4-B		General Classification	
Place	Name	Time	Name	Time
1.	Luis Mancilla (CHI)	1:20.07	Andrei Sartassov (RUS)	13:53.46
2.	Enzo Cesario (CHI)	—	Jorge Giacinti (ARG)	+0.11
3.	Walter Pérez (URU)	—	Marco Arriagada (CHI)	+0.20

=== 2006-05-09: Valparaíso — Algarrobo (107 km) ===
Place	Stage 5		General Classification	
Place	Name	Time	Name	Time
1.	Luis Mancilla (CHI)	2:26.32	Andrei Sartassov (RUS)	16:20.18
2.	Arturo Corvalán (CHI)	—	Jorge Giacinti (ARG)	+0.11
3.	Emmanuel Yáñez (URU)	—	Marco Arriagada (CHI)	+0.20

=== 2006-05-10: Santiago — Sewell (160 km) ===
Place	Stage 6		General Classification	
Place	Name	Time	Name	Time
1.	Artur García Rincón (VEN)	3:32.43	Andrei Sartassov (RUS)	20:00.57
2.	Arturo Corvalán (CHI)	+0.10	Jorge Giacinti (ARG)	+0.29
3.	Fernando Antogna (ARG)	+0.10	Luis Sepúlveda (CHI)	+1.29

=== 2006-05-11: Rancagua — Pichilemu (170 km) ===
Place	Stage 7		General Classification	
Place	Name	Time	Name	Time
1.	Enzo Cesario (CHI)	3:57.19	Andrei Sartassov (RUS)	23:58.16
2.	Gonzalo Miranda (CHI)	—	Jorge Giacinti (ARG)	+0.29
3.	Francisco Cesario (CHI)	—	Luis Sepúlveda (CHI)	+1.29

=== 2006-05-12: Paredones — Paredones (16 km) ===
Place	Stage 8-A – Individual Time Trial		General Classification	
Place	Name	Time	Name	Time
1.	Andrei Sartassov (RUS)	22.09	Andrei Sartassov (RUS)	24:20.25
2.	Jorge Giacinti (ARG)	+0.01	Jorge Giacinti (ARG)	+0.30
3.	Matías Médici (ARG)	+0.02	Luis Sepúlveda (CHI)	+2.09

=== 2006-05-12: Paredones — Curicó (170 km) ===
Place	Stage 8-B		General Classification	
Place	Name	Time	Name	Time
1.	Arturo Corvalán (CHI)	4:04.20	Andrei Sartassov (RUS)	
2.	Francisco Cesario (CHI)	—	Jorge Giacinti (ARG)	+0.30
3.	Enzo Cesario (CHI)	—	Luis Sepúlveda (CHI)	+2.09

=== 2006-05-13: Curicó — Talca (120 km) ===
Place	Stage 9		General Classification	
Place	Name	Time	Name	Time
1.	Emmanuel Yáñez (URU)	2:56.21	Andrei Sartassov (RUS)	31:21.34
2.	José Valdez (MEX)	—	Jorge Giacinti (ARG)	+0.30
3.	César Oliva (CHI)	—	Luis Sepúlveda (CHI)	+2.09

=== 2006-05-14: Santiago — Santiago (60 km) ===
Place	Stage 10		General Classification	
Place	Name	Time	Name	Time
1.	Arturo Corvalán (CHI)	1:29.15	Andrei Sartassov (RUS)	32:50.49
2.	Enzo Cesario (CHI)	—	Jorge Giacinti (ARG)	+0.30
3.	Gonzalo Miranda (CHI)	—	Luis Sepúlveda (CHI)	+2.09

== Final classification ==
RANK	CYCLIST	TEAM	TIME
1.	Andrei Sartassov (RUS)	Líder	32:50:49
2.	Jorge Giacinti (ARG)	Relax	+ 0.30
3.	Luis Sepúlveda (CHI)	Glassex Bryc Curicó	+ 2.09
4.	Enzo Cesario (CHI)	Glassex Bryc Curicó	+ 5.45
5.	Matías Médici (ARG)	Argentina National Team	+ 7.51
6.	Néstor Pias (URU)	Uruguay National Team	+ 9.53
7.	Geovane Fernández (URU)	Uruguay National Team	+ 10.07
8.	José Chacón Díaz (VEN)	Venezuela National Team	+ 10.16
9.	José Medina (CHI)	Glassex Bryc Curicó	+ 10.44
10.	José Alirio Contreras (VEN)	Venezuela National Team	+ 11.18
