= 2000 Vuelta Ciclista de Chile =

Race details
- Dates: March 23 – April 2
- Stages: 10
- Distance: 1,492.5 km (927.4 mi)
- Winning time: 35h 14' 51"

Results
	Winner	Luis Fernando Sepúlveda (CHI)	(Publiguías-Trek)
	Second	Richard Rodríguez (CHI)	(Union Ciclista Curicó)
	Third	José Medina (CHI)	(Union Ciclista Curicó)
	Points	Christian Lademann (GER)	(Agro Adler Brandenburg)
	Mountains	José Medina (CHI)	(Union Ciclista Curicó)
	Sprints	Francisco Cabrera (CHI)	(Ekono - Go! Zuko)
	Team	Union Ciclista Curicó	

The 23rd edition of the Vuelta Ciclista de Chile was held from March 23 to April 2, 2000. The stage began with a four-kilometer prologue time trial in the heart of Santiago.

Luis Fernando Sepúlveda was the winner.

== Stages ==
=== 2000-03-23: Vitacura — Vitacura (4 km) ===
Place	Prologue		General Classification	
Place	Name	Time	Name	Time
1.	Steve Speaks (USA)	00:04.32	Steve Speaks (USA)	00:04.32
2.	Luis Fernando Sepúlveda (CHI)	+0.02	Luis Fernando Sepúlveda (CHI)	+0.02
3.	Enzo Cesario (CHI)	+0.04	Enzo Cesario (CHI)	+0.04

=== 2000-03-24: Santiago — Los Andes (109.9 km) ===
Place	Stage 1		General Classification	
Place	Name	Time	Name	Time
1.	Andriss Reiss (LAT)	02:19.41	Andriss Reiss (LAT)	????????
2.	Michael McNena (IRL)	+0.06	Sven Harms (CHI)	+0.01
3.	Richard Rodríguez (CHI)	—	Richard Rodríguez (CHI)	+0.05

=== 2000-03-25: Los Andes — Viña del Mar (133.6 km) ===
Place	Stage 2		General Classification	
Place	Name	Time	Name	Time
1.	Arturo Corvalán (CHI)	03:01.34	Andriss Reiss (LAT)	????????
2.	Ángel Pérez (CHI)	—	Sven Harms (CHI)	+0.01
3.	Daniele Della Tommasina (ITA)	—	Richard Rodríguez (CHI)	+0.05

=== 2000-03-26: Viña del Mar — El Tabo (141.6 km) ===
Place	Stage 3		General Classification	
Place	Name	Time	Name	Time
1.	Andriss Reiss (LAT)	03:20.56	Andriss Reiss (LAT)	08:46.44
2.	Luis Fernando Sepúlveda (CHI)	—	Sven Harms (CHI)	+0.25
3.	Enzo Cesario (CHI)	—	Richard Rodríguez (CHI)	+0.28

=== 2000-03-27: San Antonio — Los Maitenes (194.4 km) ===
Place	Stage 4		General Classification	
Place	Name	Time	Name	Time
1.	Israel Ochoa (COL)	05:31.29	Andriss Reiss (LAT)	14:18.17
2.	Richard Rodríguez (CHI)	+0.04	Richard Rodríguez (CHI)	+0.22
3.	Luis Fernando Sepúlveda (CHI)	—	Sven Harms (CHI)	+0.25

=== 2000-03-28: San Fernando — Talca (164.9 km) ===
Place	Stage 5		General Classification	
Place	Name	Time	Name	Time
1.	Ángel Pérez (CHI)	03:55.20	Andriss Reiss (LAT)	18:13.37
2.	Víctor Garrido (CHI)	—	Richard Rodríguez (CHI)	+0.22
3.	Arturo Corvalán (CHI)	—	Sven Harms (CHI)	+0.25

=== 2000-03-29: Cauquenes — Penco (140.5 km) ===
Place	Stage 6		General Classification	
Place	Name	Time	Name	Time
1.	Enzo Cesario (CHI)	03:28.41	Andriss Reiss (LAT)	???????
2.	Richard Rodríguez (CHI)	—	Richard Rodríguez (CHI)	+0.22
3.	José Maneiro (ARG)	—	Sven Harms (CHI)	+0.25

=== 2000-03-30: San Fernando — Talca (110 km) ===
Place	Stage 7-A		General Classification	
Place	Name	Time	Name	Time
1.	José Maneiro (ARG)	02:26.22	Andriss Reiss (LAT)	24:08.40
2.	Richard Rodríguez (CHI)	—	Richard Rodríguez (CHI)	+0.08
3.	Christian Lademann (GER)	—	Marco Arriagada (CHI)	+0.29

=== 2000-03-30: Chillán — Chillán (20 km) ===
Place	Stage 7-B (Individual Time Trial)		General Classification	
Place	Name	Time	Name	Time
1.	Steve Speaks (USA)	00:23.54	Luis Fernando Sepúlveda (CHI)	24:33.17
2.	Luis Fernando Sepúlveda (CHI)	+0.07	Richard Rodríguez (CHI)	+0.15
3.	Anton Villatoro (GUA)	+0.09	Marco Arriagada (CHI)	+0.26

=== 2000-03-31: Quirihue — Curicó (213.2 km) ===
Place	Stage 8		General Classification	
Place	Name	Time	Name	Time
1.	Christian Lademann (GER)	04:49.19	Luis Fernando Sepúlveda (CHI)	29:22.50
2.	Steve Speaks (USA)	—	Richard Rodríguez (CHI)	+0.14
3.	Lisandro Cruel (ARG)	—	José Medina (CHI)	+0.47

=== 2000-04-01: Curicó — Santiago (190.9 km) ===
Place	Stage 9		General Classification	
Place	Name	Time	Name	Time
1.	Christian Lademann (GER)	04:25.13	Luis Fernando Sepúlveda (CHI)	33:48.14
2.	Antonio Cabrera (CHI)	—	Richard Rodríguez (CHI)	+0.14
3.	Anton Villatoro (GUA)	—	José Medina (CHI)	+0.47

=== 2000-04-02: Santiago (Circuito "Providencia") (69.9 km) ===
Place	Stage 10		General Classification	
Place	Name	Time	Name	Time
1.	Gonzalo Garrido (CHI)	01:26.37	Luis Fernando Sepúlveda (CHI)	35:14.51
2.	Roberto Lochowski (GER)	—	Richard Rodríguez (CHI)	+0.14
3.	Ángel Pérez (CHI)	—	José Medina (CHI)	+0.47

== Final classification ==
RANK	CYCLIST	TEAM	TIME
1.	Luis Fernando Sepúlveda (CHI)	Publiguías-Trek	35:14:51
2.	Richard Rodríguez (CHI)	Union Ciclista Curicó	+ 0.14
3.	José Medina (CHI)	Union Ciclista Curicó	+ 0.47
4.	Andriss Reiss (LAT)	Sintofarm	+ 1.04
5.	Christian Lademann (GER)	Agro Adler Brandenburg	+ 1.14
6.	Pablo González (CHI)	Ekono - Go! Zuko	+ 1.36
7.	Anton Villatoro (GUA)	7 UP/Colorado Cyclist	+ 2.10
8.	Marcelo Arriagada (CHI)	Ekono - Go! Zuko	+ 2.11
9.	Sven Harms (CHI)	Rabié Omo - Chillan	+ 2.20
10.	Libardo Niño (COL)	Aguardiente Nectar	+ 2.28
