= Francisco Cabrera (cyclist) =

Chilean racing cyclist

Personal information
- Born: June 9, 1979 (age 46)

Sport
- Sport: Cycling

Juan Francisco Cabrera Torres (born June 9, 1979) is a male professional track and road cyclist from Chile. He represented his native country at the 1999 Pan American Games in Winnipeg, Manitoba, Canada.

== Career ==
1999
10th in General Classification Vuelta Ciclista de Chile (CHI)
2000
1st in Sprints Classification Vuelta Ciclista de Chile (CHI)
2003
2nd in Stage 1 Vuelta Ciclista de Chile, Chillan (CHI)
1st in Stage 2 Vuelta Ciclista de Chile, Linares (CHI)
3rd in Stage 4 Vuelta Ciclista de Chile, Curepto (CHI)
2nd in Stage 1 Vuelta a Zamora, Santa Cristina (ESP)
1st in Stage 4 Vuelta a Zamora, Zamora (ESP)
2004
3rd in Stage 2 part a Vuelta Ciclista Lider al Sur, Valdivia (CHI)
1st in Stage 7 Vuelta Ciclista Lider al Sur, Concepcion (CHI)
2nd in Stage 6 part b Vuelta Ciclista de Chile, Algarrobo (CHI)
2005
1st in Stage 2 part b Vuelta Ciclista Lider al Sur, Ancud (CHI)
3rd in Stage 3 Vuelta Ciclista Lider al Sur, Osorno (CHI)
1st in Stage 5 Vuelta Ciclista Lider al Sur, Temuco (CHI)
3rd in Stage 10 Vuelta Ciclista Lider al Sur, Maitén (CHI)
2nd in General Classification Vuelta Ciclista Lider al Sur (CHI)
1st in Chile National Championship, Road, Elite, Chile (CHI)
3rd in Stage 1 part a Vuelta Ciclista de Chile, Curicó (CHI)
3rd in Stage 5 Vuelta Ciclista de Chile, Villa Alemana (CHI)
2nd in Stage 7 Vuelta Ciclista de Chile, Circuito Santiago (CHI)
6th in General Classification Vuelta Ciclista de Chile (CHI)
2006
1st in Stage 2 Vuelta Ciclista Lider al Sur, Osorno (CHI)
2nd in Stage 3 part a Vuelta Ciclista Lider al Sur, Valdivia (CHI)
1st in Stage 3 part b Vuelta Ciclista Lider al Sur, Mafil (CHI)

alongside Marco Arriagada, Andrei Sartassov, Jorge Giacinti, Gonzalo Garrido, and Jaime Bretti

2nd in Stage 5 Vuelta Ciclista Lider al Sur, Cañete (CHI)
3rd in Stage 1 Vuelta Ciclista de Chile, La Serena circuit (CHI)
3rd in Stage 4 part a Vuelta Ciclista de Chile, Valparaíso (CHI)
1st in Stage 8 Vuelta a Sucre, Cumana (VEN)
3rd in Stage 2 part A Vuelta al Estado Zulia (VEN)
3rd in Stage 2 part B Vuelta al Estado Zulia (VEN)
2nd in South American Games, Road, Elite, Mar del Plata (ARG)
2007
2nd in Stage 1 Vuelta a Peru, Cusco (PER)
2nd in Stage 5 Vuelta a Peru, Reparticion (PER)
1st in Stage 6 Vuelta a Peru, Arequipa (PER)
2nd in Chile National Championship, Road, Elite, Chile (CHI)
1st in Stage 1 Vuelta Ciclista Lider al Sur, Osorno (CHI)
1st in Stage 2 part b Vuelta Ciclista Lider al Sur, Mafil (CHI)

alongside Marco Arriagada, Andrei Sartassov, Jorge Giacinti, Gonzalo Garrido, and Antonio Cabrera

2nd in Stage 4 Vuelta Ciclista Lider al Sur, Cañete (CHI)
2nd in Stage 5 Vuelta Ciclista Lider al Sur, Concepcion (CHI)
3rd in Stage 6 Vuelta Ciclista Lider al Sur, Talca (CHI)
1st in Stage 7 part a Vuelta Ciclista Lider al Sur, Curicó (CHI)
3rd in Juegos del Alba, Road, Individual Time Trial, San Carlos de Austria, Venezuela
3rd in Juegos del Hibere, Road, Individual Time Trial, San Carlos de Austria, Venezuela
