= Enzo Cesario =

Chilean cyclist (born 1980)

Personal information
- Born: August 30, 1980 (age 45) Villa Alemana, Chile

Sport
- Sport: Cycling
Medal record
Men's cycling
Representing Chile
Pan American Games
Gold medal – first place	2003 Santo Domingo	Men's team pursuit
Gold medal – first place	2007 Río de Janeiro	Individual pursuit
Gold medal – first place	2007 Río de Janeiro	Men's team pursuit

Enzo Bruno Cesario Farias (born August 30, 1980) is a male professional track and road racing cyclist from Chile. He won two gold medals for his native country at the 2007 Pan American Games in Rio de Janeiro, Brazil.

== Career ==
2000
3rd in Prologue Vuelta Ciclista de Chile, Vitacura (CHI)
3rd in Stage 3 Vuelta Ciclista de Chile, El Tabo (CHI)
1st in Stage 6 Vuelta Ciclista de Chile, Penco (CHI)
2001
(bronze) in Pan American Championships, Track, 1 km, Medellin (COL)
2003
2nd in Prologue Vuelta Ciclista de Chile, Concepcion (CHI)
3rd in Stage 8 Vuelta Ciclista de Chile, Limache (CHI)
3rd in Stage 10 Vuelta Ciclista de Chile, Circuito Vitacura (CHI)
(gold) in Pan American Games, Track, Team Pursuit, Santo Domingo (DOM)
2004
(bronze) in Pan American Championships, Track, Team Pursuit, San Carlos Tinaquillo
2nd in Stage 2 Vuelta Ciclista de Chile, Chillán (CHI)
1st in Stage 4 part a Vuelta Ciclista de Chile, Curepto (CHI)
2005
2nd in Stage 4 Vuelta Ciclista de Chile, Algarrobo (CHI)
1st in Stage 5 Vuelta Ciclista de Chile, Villa Alemana (CHI)
(gold) in Pan American Championships, Track, Team Pursuit, Mar del Plata (ARG)

alongside Marco Arriagada, Gonzalo Miranda, and Luis Fernando Sepúlveda

(silver) in Pan American Championships, Track, Madison, Mar del Plata (ARG)
1st in Stage 10 Vuelta a Costa Rica, Guapiles (CRC)
2006
3rd in Stage 10 Vuelta Ciclista Lider al Sur, Circuito Santiago (CHI)
2nd in Stage 3 Vuelta Ciclista Por Un Chile Lider, San Esteban (CHI)
2nd in Stage 4 part b Vuelta Ciclista de Chile, Patrimonio de la Humanidad (CHI)
1st in Stage 7 Vuelta Ciclista de Chile, Pichilemu (CHI)
3rd in Stage 8 part b Vuelta Ciclista de Chile, Curicó circuit (CHI)
2nd in Stage 10 Vuelta Ciclista de Chile, Circuito Santiago (CHI)
1st in Sprints and Mountains Classification Vuelta Ciclista de Chile, Circuito Santiago (CHI)
(gold) in Pan American Championships, Track, Team Pursuit, Sao Paulo (BRA)
2007
(gold) in Pan American Games, Track, Individual Pursuit, Rio de Janeiro (BRA)
(gold) in Pan American Games, Track, Team Pursuit, Rio de Janeiro (BRA)

alongside Marco Arriagada, Gonzalo Miranda, and Luis Fernando Sepúlveda
