= Arturo Corvalán =

Chilean racing cyclist

Personal information
- Born: September 1, 1978 (age 48) Chile

Cycling career
- Sport: Cycling
- Current team: Retired
- Discipline: Road racing
- Role: Rider

Arturo Corvalán Galaz (born September 1, 1978) is a retired male road racing cyclist from Chile.

== Career ==
2000
1st in Stage 2 Vuelta Ciclista de Chile, Viña del Mar (CHI)
3rd in Stage 5 Vuelta Ciclista de Chile, Talca (CHI)
2001
1st in Stage 3 Vuelta Ciclista de Chile, Temuco (CHI)
1st in Stage 6 part b Vuelta Ciclista de Chile, Chillan (CHI)
1st in Stage 10 Vuelta Ciclista de Chile, Las Condes criterium (CHI)
2002
1st in Stage 7 Vuelta Ciclista de Chile, Talca (CHI)
2003
1st in Stage 5 Vuelta a Mendoza (ARG)
1st in Stage 7 Vuelta a Mendoza (ARG)
1st in General Classification Vuelta a Mendoza (ARG)
2004
1st in Stage 2 Vuelta Ciclista de Chile, Chillán (CHI)
1st in Stage 3 Vuelta Ciclista de Chile, Talca (CHI)
2nd in Stage 4 part b Vuelta Ciclista de Chile, Curicó (CHI)
3rd in Stage 6 part b Vuelta Ciclista de Chile, Algarrobo (CHI)
2nd in Stage 10 Vuelta Ciclista de Chile, Pirque (CHI)
1st in Stage 11 Vuelta Ciclista de Chile, Santiago (CHI)
2005
1st in Stage 8 Vuelta Ciclista Lider al Sur, Talca (CHI)
1st in Stage 9 Vuelta Ciclista Lider al Sur, Curicó (CHI)
1st in Stage 11 Vuelta Ciclista Lider al Sur, Santiago (CHI)
2nd in Chile National Championship, Road, Chile (CHI)
1st in Stage 1 part a Vuelta Ciclista de Chile, Curicó (CHI)
1st in Stage 7 Vuelta Ciclista de Chile, Circuito Santiago (CHI)
1st in Sprints Classification Vuelta Ciclista de Chile, Circuito Santiago (CHI)
2006
1st in Stage 1 part b Vuelta Ciclista Lider al Sur, Ancud. (CHI)
3rd in Stage 3 part a Vuelta Ciclista Lider al Sur, Valdivia (CHI)
2nd in Stage 8 part a Vuelta Ciclista Lider al Sur, Curico (CHI)
2nd in Stage 10 Vuelta Ciclista Lider al Sur, Circuito Santiago (CHI)
1st in Stage 1 Vuelta Ciclista de Chile, La Serena circuit (CHI)
2nd in Stage 5 Vuelta Ciclista de Chile, Algarrobo (CHI)
2nd in Stage 6 Vuelta Ciclista de Chile, Sewel (CHI)
1st in Stage 8 part b Vuelta Ciclista de Chile, Curicó circuit (CHI)
1st in Stage 10 Vuelta Ciclista de Chile, Circuito Santiago (CHI)
1st in Points Classification Vuelta Ciclista de Chile, Circuito Santiago (CHI)
2nd in Stage 5 Vuelta a Sucre, Araya (VEN)
1st in Stage 6 part b Vuelta a Sucre, Cumanacoa (VEN)
1st in Stage 5 Vuelta al Estado Zulia, El Chivo (VEN)
3rd in Stage 7 part A Vuelta al Estado Zulia (VEN)
2nd in Stage 7 part B Vuelta al Estado Zulia (VEN)
2nd in Stage 8 Vuelta al Estado Zulia (VEN)
3rd in General Classification Vuelta al Estado Zulia (VEN)
2007
3rd in Stage 1 Vuelta a Mendoza, Las Heras (ARG)
1st in Stage 4 Vuelta a Mendoza, San Martin (ARG)
3rd in Stage 10 Vuelta Ciclista Lider al Sur, Santiago (CHI)
3rd in Stage 6 Vuelta a Venezuela, Acarigua (VEN)
1st in Stage 4 Vuelta a Sucre, Cumaná (VEN)
2nd in Stage 5 Vuelta a Sucre, Monumento (VEN)
2nd in Stage 7 Vuelta a Sucre, Av. Gran Mariscal (VEN)

== Sources ==
- Arturo Corvalán at Cycling Archives (archive)
