= 2001 Vuelta Ciclista de Chile =

Race details
- Dates: April 19 – April 29
- Stages: 10
- Distance: 1,469 km (912.8 mi)
- Winning time: 33h 49' 24"

Results
	Winner	David Plaza (ESP)	(Festina)
	Second	Andrei Sartassov (RUS)	(Lider Ariel)
	Third	Gonzalo Garrido (CHI)	(Lider Ariel)
	Points	Andrei Sartassov (RUS)	(Lider Ariel)
	Mountains	Gonzalo Garrido (CHI)	(Lider Ariel)
	Team	Lider Ariel	

The 24th edition of the Vuelta Ciclista de Chile was held from April 19 to April 29, 2001.

== Stages ==
=== 2001-04-29: Santiago (Circuito "Las Condes") — Santiago (Circuito "Las Condes") (72 km) ===
Place	Stage 10		General Classification	
Place	Name	Time	Name	Time
1.	Arturo Corvalán (CHI)	1:32.37	David Plaza (ESP)	33:49.24
2.	Ángel Colla (ARG)	—	Andrei Sartassov (RUS)	+1.06
3.	Sven Teutenberg (GER)	—	Gonzalo Garrido (CHI)	+2.42

== Final classification ==
RANK	NAME	TEAM	TIME
1.	David Plaza (ESP)	Festina	33:49:24
2.	Andrei Sartassov (RUS)	Lider-Ariel	+ 1.06
3.	Gonzalo Garrido (CHI)	Lider-Ariel	+ 2.42
4.	Marco Arriagada (CHI)	Publiguías	+ 2.56
5.	Lisandro Cruel (CHI)	Romero-Matos	+ 3.00
6.	José Luis Rebollo (ESP)	Festina	+ 3.43
7.	Luis Fernando Sepúlveda (CHI)	Publiguías	+ 4.30
8.	Gonzalo Miranda (CHI)	Rabie-Chillán	+ 4.52
9.	Hernandes Cuadri (BRA)	Memorial Santos	+ 5.19
10.	Luis Pérez Rodríguez (ESP)	Festina	+ 5.38
