= 1998 Vuelta Ciclista de Chile =

Race details
- Dates: March 19 – March 29
- Stages: 10
- Distance: 1,495.8 km (929.4 mi)
- Winning time: 33h 42' 18"

Results
	Winner	José Ramón Uriarte (ESP)	(Festina-Lotus)
	Second	Andrei Kivilev (KAZ)	(Festina-Lotus)
	Third	Marcel Wüst (GER)	(Festina-Lotus)
	Mountains	Daniel Rogelín (BRA)	(Caloí-Parana)
	Team	(France) Aix-en-Provence	

The 21st edition of the Vuelta Ciclista de Chile was held from March 19 to March 29, 1998, in Southern Chile over a distance of 1519 km.

== Stages ==
=== 1999-03-19: Pelluco — Puerto Montt (4.2 km) ===
Place	Prologue	
Place	Name	Time
1.	Sebastián Medan (FRA)	4.56.21
2.	Marcel Wüst (GER)	5.01.47
3.	Gustavo Figueredo (URU)	5.03.49

=== 1999-03-20: Puerto Montt — Osorno (137.4 km) ===
Place	Stage 1	
Place	Name	Time
3:00.52
2.	Bert Grabsch (GER)	+0.04
3.	Gonzalo Garrido (CHI)	+0.06

=== 1999-03-21: Osorno — Valdivia (137.4 km) ===
Place	Stage 1	
Place	Name	Time
1.	Richard Rodríguez (CHI)	

=== 1999-03-22: Valdivia — Temuco (172.6 km) ===
Place	Stage 3	
Place	Name	Time
1.	Rodrigo Galvan (ARG)	4:11.12
2.	Olaf Pollack (GER)	+0.04
3.	Marcel Wüst (GER)	+0.06

=== 1999-03-23: Temuco — Los Angeles (201.2 km) ===
Place	Stage 4	
Place	Name	Time
1.	Danilo Hondo (GER)	4:26.01
2.	Hernández Quadri (BRA)	+0.04
3.	Rodrigo Galvan (ARG)	+0.06

=== 1999-03-24: Los Angeles — Concepción (143.6 km) ===
Place	Stage 5	
Place	Name	Time
1.	Ángel Pérez (CHI)	3:04.58
2.	Marcel Wüst (GER)	+0.04
3.	Luciano Pagliarini (BRA)	+0.06

=== 1999-03-25: Concepción — Chillán (164.6 km) ===
Place	Stage 6	
Place	Name	Time
1.	Marcel Wüst (GER)	4:04.23
2.	Olaf Pollack (GER)	+0.04
3.	Ángel Pérez (CHI)	+0.05

=== 1999-03-26: Chillán — Talca (161.6 km) ===
Place	Stage 7	
Place	Name	Time
1.	Rodrigo Galvan (ARG)	3:36.11
2.	Ángel Pérez (CHI)	+0.04
3.	Víctor Garrido (CHI)	+0.06

=== 1999-03-27: San Clemente — Curicó (100.7 km) ===
Place	Stage 8-A	
Place	Name	Time
1.	Marcel Wüst (GER)	1:52.03
2.	Danilo Hondo (GER)	+0.02
3.	Luciano Pagliarini (BRA)	+0.04

=== 1999-03-27: Comallé — Curicó (15.3 km) ===
Place	Stage 8-B	
Place	Name	Time
1.	Luis Fernando Sepúlveda (CHI)	20.10
2.	Gustavo Figueredo (URU)	—
3.	Márcio May (BRA)	+0.02

=== 1999-03-28: Curicó — Rancagua (188 km) ===
Place	Stage 9	
Place	Name	Time
1.	Marcel Wüst (GER)	

=== 1998-03-29: Santiago (Circuito "Providencia") (71.4 km) ===
Place	Stage 10	
Place	Name	Time
1.	Rodrigo Galvan (ARG)	1:38.21
2.	Danilo Hondo (GER)	+0.04
3.	José Ramón Uriarte (ESP)	+0.06

== Final Classification ==
RANK	CYCLIST	TEAM	TIME
1.	José Ramón Uriarte (ESP)	Festina-Lotus	33:42.18
2.	Andrei Kivilev (KAZ)	Festina-Lotus	+0.15
3.	Marcel Wüst (GER)	Festina-Lotus	+0.44
4.	Thierry Laurent (FRA)	Festina-Lotus	??
5.	Laurent Lefèvre (FRA)	Festina-Lotus	??
6.	Rodrigo Galvan (ARG)	Giant	??
7.	Hernández Cuadri (BRA)	Caloí	??
8.	Glauber Souza (BRA)	Caloí	??
9.	Bert Grabsch (GER)	Agro – Adler	??
10.	Sebastián Medan (FRA)	Festina-Lotus	??
