= 2002 Vuelta Ciclista de Chile =

Race details
- Dates: March 12–24
- Stages: 13
- Distance: 1,678 km (1,043 mi)
- Winning time: 41h 59' 28"

Results
	Winner	Gonzalo Salas (ARG)	(Lider Ariel)
	Second	Marcelo Agüero (ARG)	(Ekono)
	Third	Edgardo Simón (ARG)	(Publiguías-Bianchi)
	Points	Edgardo Simón (ARG)	(Publiguías-Bianchi)
	Mountains	Pablo González (CHI)	(Lider Ariel)
	Team	(Chile) Lider Ariel	

The 25th edition of the Vuelta Ciclista de Chile was held from March 12 to March 24, 2002.

== Stages ==
=== 2002-03-24: Santiago — Santiago (60 km) ===
Place	Stage 12		General Classification	
Place	Name	Time	Name	Time
1.	Pierre Bourquenoud (SUI)	1:18.12	Gonzalo Salas (ARG)	41:59.28
2.	Andrei Sartassov (RUS)	—	Marcelo Agüero (ARG)	+0.30
3.	Edgardo Simón (ARG)	+0.05	Edgardo Simón (ARG)	+0.41

== Final classification ==
RANK	CYCLIST	TEAM	TIME
1.	Gonzalo Salas (ARG)	Lider Ariel	41:59:28
2.	Marcelo Agüero (ARG)	Ekono	+ 0.30
3.	Edgardo Simón (ARG)	Publiguías-Bianchi	+ 0.41
4.	Luis Fernando Sepúlveda (CHI)	Ace-Bryc Curicó	+ 0.45
5.	Pierre Bourquenoud (SUI)	Oktos-St Quentin	+ 0.54
6.	Márcio May (BRA)	Brazilian National Team	+ 1.55
7.	Andrei Sartassov (RUS)	Lider Ariel	+ 2.12
8.	Héctor Meza (COL)	Mobilvetta Design	+ 4.02
9.	José Medina (CHI)	Ace-Bryc Curicó	+ 4.29
10.	Pablo González (CHI)	Lider Ariel	+ 4.41
