= Juan Fierro =

Chilean racing cyclist

Personal information
- Born: January 17, 1974 (age 52) Penco, Chile

Sport
- Sport: Cycling

Juan Manuel Fierro González (born January 17, 1974, in Penco) is a male professional track and road cyclist from Chile. He represented his native country at the 1999 Pan American Games in Winnipeg, Manitoba, Canada. Juan won the Vuelta por un Chile Líder in 2000 and the elite individual time trial at the Chilean National Road Championships in 2004. Fierro also represented Chile in the men's road race at the 1999 Pan American Games in Winnipeg.

== Career ==
Fierro competed in Chilean and international stage races during the 1990s and 2000s. At the 1999 Pan American Games, he finished 41st in the men's road race. The following year, he won the general classification of the Vuelta por un Chile Líder.

In February 2002, Fierro finished second to Jaime Bretti on the third stage of the Vuelta Líder al Sur. During that year's Vuelta Ciclista de Chile, he was second in the general classification after the third stage. He later finished second to Brazilian cyclist Márcio May on the sixth stage between Ninhue and Constitución.

In the 2004 Vuelta Ciclista de Chile, riding for Ace Bryc-Curicó, Fierro took the overall lead after the fourth stage. He held a one-second advantage over teammates José Medina and Luis Fernando Sepúlveda. The following month, he won the elite individual time trial at the Chilean National Road Championships.

Fierro continued competing later in the decade. In 2006 he finished second on a stage of the Vuelta por un Chile Líder, and in 2007 he placed third overall in the Vuelta de Atacama.

He later continued racing in masters events. In 2023, La Discusión reported that Fierro had won the national road title in his masters category and placed third in the individual time trial; he also won the Master B category of the Vuelta Master that year.

1995

Pan American Games, Mar del Plata (Arg)

1999
38th in Pan American Games, Winnipeg (CAN)
2000
1st in General Classification Vuelta Ciclista Por Un Chile Lider (CHI)
2002
1ro Campeonato Nacional de Chile, en la CRI (CHI)
2003
Ciclista Elite de Team Vibrogan
February 1995 - March 1998
Ciclista Elite de Team Supermercados Ekono
April 1998 - December 1999
Ciclista Elite de Team Supermercados Lider
1999 - April 2003
Ciclista Elite de Team Supermercado Ace Brick
November 2003 - April 2006
Ciclista Elite de Transportes Bretti
May 2007 - November 2008
Ciclista Elite de Federación de Ciclismo
December 1992 - November 2004
Ciclista Master Team MDR CSS Chillán

Participation in Regional Multi-sport Events
Pan American Games Mar del Plata (1995)
Pan American Games Winnipeg (1999)
South American Games Chile (1994)
South American Games Ecuador (1998)
3er lugar Campeonato Panamericano 4 X 100, Curicó Chile:
Participación Panamericano Venezuela (1996)
Participación Panamericano Colombia(1997)
Participación Panamericano Brasil(1998)

World Championships
World Champion (Colombia) 1995
Olympic Games 1996
Clasificado para Mundial Trento Italia año 2022 en Ruta y CRI

Campeonatos Nacionales.
Cuarto en campeonato nacional La Serena 1990
Quinto en Campeonato nacional de Los Angeles 1991
Tercer campeón de Chile Concepción 1993
Tercer 4 x 100 campeonato de Chile Concepción, 1993
Tercer campeón de Chile Ruta, Talca 1994
Vice campeón de Chile, Puerto Montt 1997
Tercer Campeón Nacional, Quilpue 1998
4to Campeón Nacional Crono, La Serena 1999
Campeón de Chile Contra el Reloj 2002
Vice campeón de Chile contra el reloj 2003
Campeón de Chile Contra el Reloj 2004
Campeón de Chile 4x4000 por equipos 2004 Pista
Campeón de Chile Prueba Pista Madison (pareja Richard Rodríguez) Diciembre

2007

Actual Campeón de Chile de Ruta cat. Master 2022
Actual Campeón de Chile de CRI cat. Master 2022

Vueltas de Chile.
Año : 1995, 1996, 1997, 1998, 1999, 2000,
2001, 3ro prologo Vuelta Chile
2002, Ganadores por equipo Vuelta Chile (Equipo Lider)
Segundo etapa Valdivia - Pucón
Segundo etapa Ninhue - Constitución
2003, Ganadores por equipo Vuelta Chile (Equipo Lider)
2004, Primeros en Contra-reloj por Equipo primera etapa
Vice campeón por equipo Vuelta Chile (Equipo Ace Bryc Curicó)
2005,
Vice campeón por equipo Vuelta Chile 2005 (Equipo Ace Bryc Curicó)
2006, Vuelta Chile Ganadores por Equipo (Equipo Ace Bryc Curicó)
Vueltas Internacionales
36° lugar vuelta New Zealand 1993 (New Zealand)
Vuelta Cuyo Argentina 1993
Ganador de una etapa vuelta Cuyo (Argentina)
Vuelta Regatas Lima (Perú) 1993, 1994, 1996, 1998
19° Rutas de América (Uruguay) 1995Vuelta del Uruguay 1995
2do por equipo Vuelta estado de Paraná (Brasil) 1998
5to lugar General Vuelta Sta. Catarina (Brasil) 1998
3ro en 6ta etapa Vuelta Sta. Catarina (Brasil) 1998
3 meses de Competencia en un equipo español en España 1999 (Amateur)
Vuelta Valenciana Amateur 1999 (España)
Vuelta Commonwealth Bank Australia 1999 (Australia)
Vuelta santa Catarina 2000 (Brasil)
2do lugar Metas Volantes Doble Copa Cabana, (La Paz, Bolivia 2000)
Vuelta Doble Copa Cabana, (La Paz, Bolivia 2001)
Vuelta Doble Copa Cabana, (La Paz, Bolivia 2002)
País Vasco 2001(España)
Vuelta San Juan (Argentina) 1998, 1999, 2000, 2001, 2002, 2003, 2004, 2005,
2007
Doblé Calingasta 1997, 1998 (8vo), Argentina
Vuelta Municipales San Juan 1997, 1998, Argentina
Vuelta Táchira (Venezuela) 2005
50o Vuelta Venezuela 2005 agosto29 a 11 sept.(14 días)
2005 Vuelta Córdoba
Vuelta Costa Rica
2006 Vuelta Mendoza febrero
Vuelta Costa Rica Diciembre
2007 Vuelta Sao Paulo
2019 Vuelta las América Panamá décimo en la general

Vueltas Nacionales.
1er lugar Vuelta Puerto Montt 1995
2do lugar Termas de Chillán 1995
Primero Vuelta al Perro Stgo, 1995
3ro lugar Vuelta Puerto Montt, 1996
1er lugar Vuelta Arica, 1997
2do lugar Termas de Chillán 1998
3er lugar Termas de Chillán 2000 (Chile)
1er lugar Vuelta al Sur 2000 (Chile)
1er lugar Cuatro Puntos Cardinales 2000 (Santiago de Chile)
Lider en Bike tour La serena, Iquique (Chile)
2do lugar Termas de Chillán 2001 (Chile)
2005 Vuelta Por Un Chile Lider
2006 Vuelta por un Chile Líder Marzo
segundo en la etapa Chillán-Talca2007 Ganador de las Termas de Chillán 3 :días 4 etapas. Enero
2007 Vuelta por un Chile Líder Marzo
2007 Vuelta al norte Chico Copiapó Mayo 3ro en la General
2008 Primero Raid, Los Ángeles (12 fechas), MTB
2009 Primero Raid, Los Ángeles (12 fechas), MTB
2011 Primer lugar Máster Arauco Adventures, MTB
2011 Primero General Vuelta Maule Sur, Linares
2014 Primero Vuelta Maule Sur Máster, Linares
2015 Primero Vuelta Maule Sur Máster, Linares
2016 Segundo Termas de Chillán, Máster
2016 Primero Vuelta Máster, Chillán
2016 Segundo Vuelta Máster, Santiago
2016 Primer lugar Kiwi Pro, Máster (2 Fechas)
2017 Segundo Termas de Chillán, Master
2017 Segundo General Vuelta Máster, Chillán
2018 Segundo General Vuelta Master, Chillán
2018 Primero Termas de Chillán, Master
2020 Pandemia
2021 Pandemia
2022
Primero en Vuelta Master, Chillán:
Primero en la cat. Master Giro del Lago
Actual Campeón de Chile de Ruta cat. Master
Actual Campeón de Chile de CRI cat. Master
Segundo en Cat. Master en Monumento Cardenal Samore

2nd in Chile National Championship, Road, Individual Time Trial, Chile (CHI)
2004
1st in Chile National Championship, Road, Individual Time Trial, Chile (CHI)
2006
2nd in Stage 7 Vuelta Vuelta Ciclista Por Un Chile Lider, Talca (CHI)
2007
2nd in Stage 3 Ascensión a los Nevados de Chillán (CHI)
1st in General Classification Ascensión a los Nevados de Chillán (CHI)
3rd in General Classification Vuelta de Atacama (CHI)
