= Marcelo Arriagada =

Chilean cyclist (born 1973)

Marcelo Arriagada Quinchel (born 22 August 1973) is a male professional track and road cyclist from Chile. An older brother of Marco Arriagada he competed for his native country at the 2004 Summer Olympics in Athens, Greece, where he didn't finish the men's individual road race.

He was born in Curicó, Chile.

== Career ==
2000
8th in General Classification Vuelta Ciclista de Chile (CHI)
2003
3rd in Stage 1 Vuelta a Zamora, Santa Cristina (ESP)
2004
2nd in Stage 7 Vuelta Ciclista Por Un Chile Lider, Villa Alemana (CHI)
3rd in General Classification Vuelta Ciclista de Chile (CHI)
2005
1st in Stage 7 Vuelta Ciclista Por Un Chile Lider, Concepción (CHI)
10th in General Classification Vuelta Ciclista de Chile
2006
2nd in Stage 2 Vuelta Ciclista Por Un Chile Lider, Osorno (CHI)
2008
1st in Stage 4 Vuelta a Mendoza, Las Heras (ARG)
