= Agro–Adler Brandenburg =

German cycling team (1997–2001)

Team information
- UCI code: AAB
- Registered: Germany
- Founded: 1997
- Disbanded: 2001
- Discipline: Road
- Status: Trade Team II

Key personnel
- General manager: Dirk Meier
- Team managers: René Schmidt; Lothar Thoms; Achmed Wolke

Team name history
- 1997–2001: Agro–Adler Brandenburg

Agro–Adler Brandenburg was a German road cycling team that competed professionally between 1997 and 2001.

== Major wins ==
1997
Stage 1 Tour de l'Ain, Danilo Hondo
Stage 7a (ITT) Rheinland-Pfalz Rundfahrt, Martin Müller
Stage 9 Peace Race, Steffen Blochwitz
1998
Stage 2 Tour de Pologne, Danilo Hondo
Regio-Tour

Stage 1, Bert Grabsch
Stage 4, Danilo Hondo

Stage 2 Hessen Rundfahrt, Danilo Hondo
Stage 11 Olympia's Tour, Olaf Pollack
1999
Stage 5 Deutschland Tour, Andreas Kappes
Stage 9 Peace Race, Olaf Pollack
Stage 5 Niedersachsen-Rundfahrt, Olaf Pollack
2000
Stage 3 Niedersachsen-Rundfahrt, Christian Lademann
2001
Brandenburg-Rundfahrt, Christian Lademann
Stage 6 Peace Race, Christian Lademann

== Notable riders ==
- Danilo Hondo (1997–1998)
- Bert Grabsch (1997–1998)
- Olaf Pollack (1997–1999)
- Martin Müller (1997–1999)
- Volker Ordowski (1998)
- Uwe Ampler (1999)
- Andreas Kappes (1999–2000)
- Steffen Blochwitz (1997–1999)
- Andreas Beikirch (2000)
- Roberto Lochowski (2000)
- Christian Lademann (2000)
