= 2006 Pan American Cycling Championships =

- Venue: São Paulo, Brazil
- Date(s): June 4–11, 2006
- Velodrome: Caleirasen
- Events: 21

The 2006 Pan American Cycling Championships took place at the Caleirasen Velodrome, São Paulo, Brazil, June 4–11, 2006. Cuba led the championship with twelve medals.

== Medal summary ==
=== Road ===
==== Men ====
| Event | Gold | Silver | Bronze |
|---|---|---|---|
| Individual road race | José Serpa; Colombia | Breno Sidoti; Brazil | Alex Diniz; Brazil |
| Individual time trial | Pedro Nicacio; Brazil | Magno Nazaret; Brazil | Eric Wohlberg; Canada |

==== Women ====
| Event | Gold | Silver | Bronze |
|---|---|---|---|
| Individual road race | Yumari González; Cuba | Kori Seehafer; United States | Clemilda Fernandes; Brazil |
| Individual time trial | Amber Neben; United States | Erinne Willock; Canada | Kori Seehafer; United States |

==== Under 23 Men ====
| Event | Gold | Silver | Bronze |
|---|---|---|---|
| Individual road race | Alex Diniz; Brazil | Tiago Fiorilli; Brazil | Artur García; Venezuela |
| Individual time trial | Magno Nazaret; Brazil | Bradley Fairall; Canada | Federico Pagani; Argentina |

=== Track ===
==== Men ====
| Event | Gold | Silver | Bronze |
|---|---|---|---|
| Sprint | ~~Stephen Alfred~~; United States | Travis Smith; Canada | Giddeon Massie; United States |
| 1 km time trial | Cam Mackinnon; Canada | Julio Herrera; Cuba | Matt Barlee; Canada |
| Keirin | Leandro Bottasso; Argentina | Travis Smith; Canada | Ricardo Lynch; Jamaica |
| Scratch | Walter Pérez; Argentina | Ángel Colla; Argentina | José Aravena; Chile |
| Points race | Andris Hernández; Venezuela | Michel Fernández; Cuba | Jairo Pérez; Colombia |
| Individual pursuit | Carlos Alzate; Colombia | Jairo Pérez; Colombia | Zachary Bell; Canada |
| Madison | Argentina; Juan Curuchet; Walter Pérez | Chile; Enzo Cesario; Luis Sepúlveda | Brazil; Hernandes Quadri; Mac Donald Fernandes |
| Team sprint | Cuba; Yasmani Pol; Julio Herrera; Alexis Sotolongo | Argentina; Darío Grosso; Leandro Bottasso; Sergio Guatto | United States; Giddeon Massie; Michael Blatchford; Stephen Alfred |
| Team pursuit | Chile; Enzo Cesario; Antonio Cabrera; Luis Sepúlveda; Gonzalo Miranda | Argentina; Guillermo Bruneta; Jorge Pi; Fernando Antogna; César Sigura | Venezuela; Tomás Gil; Isaac Cañizales; Andrés Hernández; Freddy Segura |

==== Women ====
| Event | Gold | Silver | Bronze |
|---|---|---|---|
| Sprint | Diana García; Colombia | Lisandra Guerra; Cuba | Angie González; Venezuela |
| 500 m time trial | Lisandra Guerra; Cuba | Angie González; Venezuela | Diana García; Colombia |
| Keirin | Lisandra Guerra; Cuba | Angie González; Venezuela | Diana García; Colombia |
| Individual pursuit | María Calle; Colombia | Yoanka González; Cuba | Yudelmis Domínguez; Cuba |
| Points race | Yoanka González; Cuba | Cristina Greve; Argentina | Mónica Méndez; Colombia |
| Scratch | Yumari González; Cuba | Yoanka González; Cuba | Karelia Machado; Venezuela |
