= Gabriel Brizuela =

Argentine cyclist

Personal information
- Full name: Gabriel Alejandro Brizuela
- Born: 12 August 1979 (age 47)

Cycling career
- Sport: Cycling
- Current team: Municipalidad de Guaymallén
- Discipline: Road
- Role: Rider

Amateur teams
- 2007: Alas Rojas de Santa Lucía
- 2015: AC Mardan-Municipalidad de Caucete
- 2016: Stylo Bike San Juan
- 2016–: Municipalidad de Guaymallén

Professional team
- 2006: Colavita–Sutter Home

Gabriel Alejandro Brizuela (born August 12, 1979) is an Argentine professional racing cyclist.

== Major results ==
2005
4th Overall Vuelta Ciclista de Chile
2006
3rd Overall Vuelta a Mendoza
2007
3rd Overall Vuelta al Chana
4th Overall Tour de San Luis
2008
2nd Overall Vuelta a San Juan

1st Stage 7

2011
1st Prologue & Stage 3 Vuelta a Mendoza
2013
2nd Overall Vuelta a Mendoza

1st Stage 2

2015
1st Overall Vuelta a Mendoza
2017
3rd Overall Vuelta a Mendoza
