= Christian Lademann =

German cyclist (born 1975)

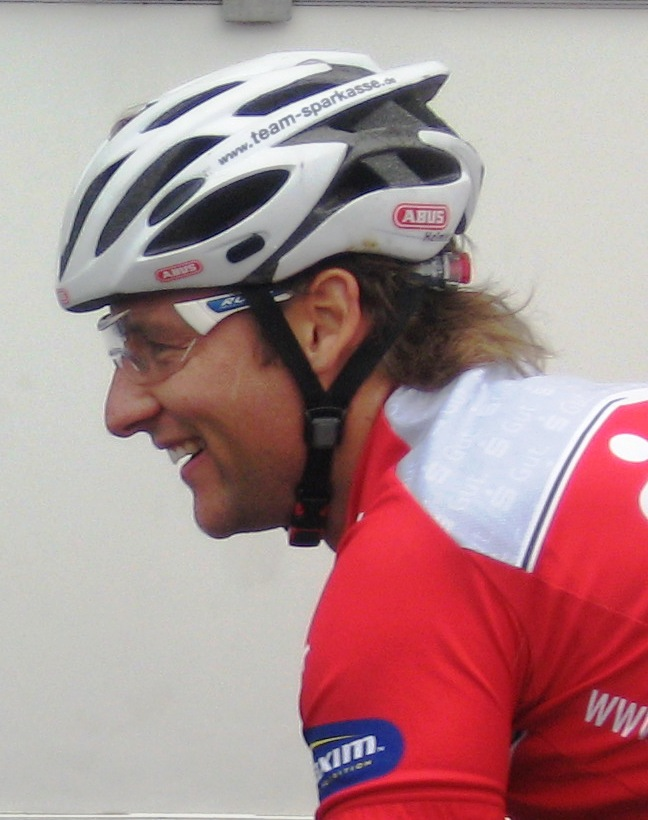

Personal information
- Born: 30 October 1975 (age 50) Blankenburg, Bezirk Magdeburg, East Germany (present-day Germany)

Cycling career
- Sport: Cycling
- Current team: Retired
- Disciplines: Road, track
- Role: Rider

Professional teams
- 2000–2001: Agro–Adler Brandenburg
- 2002–2003: Wüstenrot–ZVVZ
- 2005–2008: Team Sparkasse

Christian Lademann (born 30 October 1975, Blankenburg) is a former German professional racing cyclist.

Lademann became world champion at the UCI Track Cycling World Championships in 1999 in the team pursuit with the German team, a year after they had become Military World Champions and Vice World Champions. On the road he already won the Tour of Tunisia as an amateur at the age of 18 and in 1999 a stage of the Tour of Rheinland Palatinate.

In 2000 he rode for Agro-Adler Brandenburg winning two stages of the Tour of Chile and a stage in both the Tour of Argentina and the Tour of Lower Saxony. In 2001 he won the Tour of Brandenburg and a stage of the Peace Race.

At the 2004 Summer Olympics in Athens, Lademann with the German National Pursuit Team lost out to the Spanish Team in the ride off for bronze. From 2005 onwards until his retirement at the end of 2008, he rode under contract with the German continental team Sparkasse.

In 2009 a sample of Lademann's from the year 2007 was retrospectively tested following newly developed test methods and found to be positive for EPO. Lademann did not request a B-sample, as he had already ended his professional career.

== Major results ==
=== Road ===
1999
1st Stage 7 Rheinland-Pfalz Rundfahrt
2000
Vuelta Ciclista de Chile

1st Stages 8 & 9
1st Points Classification

1st Stage 13 Vuelta a la Argentina
2001
1st Stage 6 Peace Race
1st Overall Brandenburg-Rundfahrt
2006
1st Stage 2 Bay Cycling Classic
2007
1st Stage 7 International Cycling Classic

=== Track ===
1996
1st National team pursuit championships (with Guido Fulst, Robert Bartko and Heiko Szonn)
2nd Individual pursuit, Under-23 European Track Championships
1997
1st Individual pursuit, Under-23 European Track Championships
1998
2nd Team pursuit, World Track Championships
1999
1st Team pursuit, World Track Championships (with Daniel Becke, Robert Bartko and Guido Fulst)

World Cup

2001
1st National Madison Championships (with Mathias Kahl)
