= Emanuel Yáñez =

Uruguayan cyclist

Personal information
- Born: 23 February 1985 (age 41)

Cycling career
- Sport: Cycling
- Current team: CNP Bocas del Cufré
- Discipline: Road
- Role: Rider

Amateur teams
- 2014: Fénix
- 2015–2016: CCSD Amanecer
- 2017: C.C.S.D. Treinta y Tres de San Jose
- 2018: CNP Bocas del Cufré
- 2019: Avenida Artigas de Guichón
- 2020: C.C.S.D. Treinta y Tres de San Jose
- 2022–: CNP Bocas del Cufré

Emanuel Yáñez Machín (born 23 February 1985) is a Uruguayan professional track and road cyclist.

== Major results ==
2003
1st Overall Vuelta Ciclista de la Juventud
2006
1st Stage 9 Vuelta del Uruguay
1st Stage 9 Vuelta Ciclista de Chile
2009
1st Stage 2 Rutas de America
2010
4th Overall Vuelta del Paraguay
2011
5th Overall Vuelta del Uruguay

1st Stage 3

2012
1st Road race, National Road Championships
2014
1st Road race, National Road Championships
