= Gonzalo Miranda =

Chilean racing cyclist (born 1979)

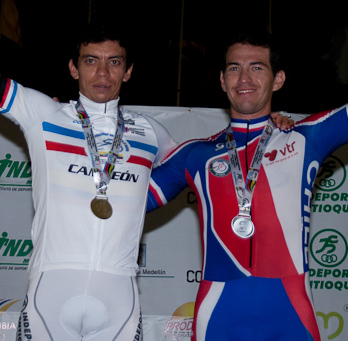
- Miranda (right) at the 2011 Pan American Cycling Championships

Personal information
- Full name: Gonzalo Sabas Miranda Figueroa
- Born: 6 October 1979 (age 47)

Cycling career
- Sport: Cycling
- Current team: U.C. Curicó
- Disciplines: Road; Track
- Role: Rider

Amateur teams
- 2015: Stylo Bike San Juan
- 2016: BMC Exportxpert
- 2018: Team CCA
- 2019: OGM Cycling Adventur
- 2020–: U.C. Curicó

Professional team
- 2017–2018: Equipo Continental Municipalidad de Pocito
Medal record
Representing Chile
Men's track cycling
Pan American Games
Gold medal – first place	2007 Rio de Janeiro	Team pursuit
Silver medal – second place	2011 Guadalajara	Team pursuit
Pan American Championships
Gold medal – first place	2005 Mar del Plata	Team pursuit
Gold medal – first place	2006 São Paulo	Team pursuit
Gold medal – first place	2012 Mar del Plata	Team pursuit
Silver medal – second place	2004 Cojedes	Scratch
Silver medal – second place	2004 Cojedes	Points race
Silver medal – second place	2007 Valencia	Madison
Silver medal – second place	2008 Montevideo	Madison
Silver medal – second place	2008 Montevideo	Team pursuit
Silver medal – second place	2011 Medellin	Team pursuit
Bronze medal – third place	2004 Cojedes	Team pursuit
Bronze medal – third place	2011 Medellin	Individual pursuit
Bronze medal – third place	2015 Santiago	Madison

Gonzalo Sabas Miranda Figueroa (born October 6, 1979) is a Chilean track and road cyclist, who currently rides for the Chilean amateur team U.C. Curicó. He won a gold medal in the team pursuit at the 2007 Pan American Games in Rio de Janeiro, Brazil.

== Major results ==
2001
8th Overall Vuelta Ciclista de Chile

1st Stage 1

2003
3rd Road race, National Road Championships
2004
1st Stage 3 Tour de San Juan
1st Stage 10 Vuelta Ciclista de Chile
Pan American Track Championships

2nd (silver) Points race
3rd (bronze) Team pursuit

2005
1st (gold) Team pursuit, Pan American Track Championships (with Marco Arriagada, Enzo Cesario, and Luis Fernando Sepúlveda)
1st Stage 4a Vuelta Ciclista Por Un Chile Lider
8th Overall Vuelta Ciclista de Chile
9th Overall Vuelta Ciclista Por Un Chile Lider
2006
1st (gold) Team pursuit, Pan American Track Championships
Tour de San Juan

1st Stages 5, 6 & 9

1st Stage 6 Vuelta a Mendoza
1st Stage 4a Vuelta Ciclista de Chile
2007
1st (gold) Team pursuit, Pan American Games (with Marco Arriagada, Enzo Cesario, and Luis Fernando Sepúlveda)
1st Stage 2a Vuelta Ciclista Por Un Chile Lider
2nd (silver) Madison, Pan American Track Championships
2008
1st Road race, National Road Championships
1st Prologue Vuelta a Mendoza
1st Stage 2 Vuelta a Toledo
2011
2nd (silver) Team pursuit, Pan American Games
2017
1st Stage 5 Vuelta Ciclista de Chile
1st Stage 8 Vuelta a Mendoza
