= 2005 Pan American Cycling Championships =

- Venue: Mar del Plata, Argentina
- Date(s): April 25, May 1, 2005
- Velodrome: Velódromo Julio Polet
- Nations participating: 22
- Cyclists participating: 250

The 2005 Pan American Cycling Championships took place at the Julio Polet Velodrome, Mar del Plata, Argentina April 25, May 1, 2005.

== Medal summary ==
=== Road ===
==== Men ====
Event	Gold	Silver	Bronze
Individual road race	John Parra; Colombia	Charles Dionne; Canada	Damier Martínez; Cuba
Individual time trial	Edgardo Simón; Argentina	Pedro Nicacio; Brazil	Guillermo Brunetta; Argentina

==== Women ====
Event	Gold	Silver	Bronze
Individual road race	Tina Mayolo-Pic; United States	Yeilien Fernández; Cuba	Yumari González; Cuba
Individual time trial	Kristin Armstrong; United States	Christine Thorburn; United States	Paola Madriñan; Colombia

==== Under 23 Men ====
Event	Gold	Silver	Bronze
Individual road race	Maximiliano Richeze; Argentina	Jorge Soto; Uruguay	Jorge Montenegro; Argentina
Individual time trial	Weimar Roldan; Colombia	Jorge Soto; Uruguay	Fabricio Ferrari; Uruguay

=== Track ===
==== Men ====
Event	Gold	Silver	Bronze
Sprint	Barry Forde; Barbados	Kevin Belz; United States	Michael Blatchford; United States
1 km time trial	Wilson Meneses; Colombia	Sergio Guatto; Argentina	Travis Smith; Canada
Keirin	Barry Forde; Barbados	José Sochón; Guatemala	Kevin Belz; United States
Scratch	Ángel Colla; Argentina	José Aravena; Chile	Walter Pérez; Argentina
Points race	Juan Curuchet; Argentina	Marco Arriagada; Chile	John Parra; Colombia
Individual pursuit	Edgardo Simón; Argentina	Marco Arriagada; Chile	Brad Huff; United States
Madison	Argentina; Juan Curuchet; Walter Pérez	Chile; Enzo Cesario; Luis Sepúlveda	Colombia; José Serpa; Alexander González
Team sprint	Cuba; Ahmed López; Julio Herrera; Reiner Cartaya	Canada; Travis Smith; Cam Mackinnon; Yannik Morin	United States; Kevin Belz; Michael Blatchford; Stephen Alfred
Team pursuit	Chile; Enzo Cesario; Marco Arriagada; Luis Sepúlveda; Gonzalo Miranda	Argentina; Edgardo Simón; Sebastián Cancio; Fernando Antogna; César Sigura	Colombia; José Serpa; Carlos Alzate; Alexander González; Carlos Quintero

==== Women ====
Event	Gold	Silver	Bronze
Sprint	Diana García; Colombia	Lisandra Guerra; Cuba	Angie González; Venezuela
500 m time trial	Lisandra Guerra; Cuba	Nancy Contreras; Mexico	Yumari González; Cuba
Keirin	Daniela Larreal; Venezuela	Lisandra Guerra; Cuba	Diana García; Colombia
Individual pursuit	María Calle; Colombia	Kristin Armstrong; United States	Erin Mirabella; United States
Points race	Erin Mirabella; United States	Yudelmis Domínguez; Cuba	Yumari González; Cuba
Scratch	Yumari González; Cuba	Mandy Poitras; Canada	Gina Grain; Canada
