= Richard Rodríguez (cyclist) =

Chilean cyclist

Personal information
- Born: 21 November 1978 (age 47)

Sport
- Sport: Cycling
Medal record
Representing Chile
Pan American Games
Bronze medal – third place	1999 Winnipeg	Madison
Pan American Championships
Gold medal – first place	2002 Quito	Madison
Gold medal – first place	2002 Quito	Team pursuit

Richard Angelo Rodríguez Rodríguez (born 21 November 1978) is a Chilean male track and road cyclist. He represented his native country at the 1999 Pan American Games in Winnipeg, Manitoba, Canada.

== Career highlights ==
1998
1st in Stage 2 Vuelta Ciclista de Chile, Valdivia (CHI)
1999
9th in General Classification Vuelta Ciclista de Chile (CHI)
2000
3rd in Stage 1 Vuelta Ciclista de Chile, Los Andes (CHI)
2nd in Stage 4 Vuelta Ciclista de Chile, Los Maitenes (CHI)
2nd in Stage 6 Vuelta Ciclista de Chile, Penco (CHI)
2nd in Stage 7-a Vuelta Ciclista de Chile, Talca (CHI)
2nd in General Classification Vuelta Ciclista de Chile (CHI)

2001 stage Giro de Cosenza

2002
(gold) in Pan American Championships, Track, Madison, Quito (ECU)
(gold) in Pan American Championships, Track, Team Pursuit, Quito (ECU)
2003
1st in Stage 3 part a Vuelta Ciclista de Chile, Talca (CHI)
2nd in Stage 4 Vuelta Ciclista de Chile, Curepto (CHI)
3rd in Stage 6 Vuelta Ciclista de Chile, San Antonio (CHI)
2nd in Stage 8 Vuelta Ciclista de Chile, Limache (CHI)
1st in Stage 10 Vuelta Ciclista de Chile, Circuito Vitacura (CHI)
10th in General Classification Vuelta Ciclista de Chile (CHI)
3rd in Stage 1 Volta do Rio de Janeiro, Angra dos Reis (BRA)
1st in Stage 3 Volta do Rio de Janeiro, São Pedro da Aldeia (BRA)
1st in Stage 4 Volta do Rio de Janeiro, Niteroi (BRA)
1st in Stage 5 Volta do Rio de Janeiro, Rio de Janeiro (circuito) (BRA)
3rd in General Classification Volta do Rio de Janeiro (BRA)
2005
1st in Stage 1 Vuelta Ciclista Lider al Sur, Castro (CHI)
(bronze) in Chile National Championship, Road, Elite, Chile (CHI)
1st in Stage 2 Vuelta Ciclista de Chile, Rancagua (CHI)
2nd in Stage 5 Vuelta Ciclista de Chile, Villa Alemana (CHI)
7th in General Classification Vuelta Ciclista de Chile
1st in Stage 11 Vuelta a Venezuela, El Tigro (VEN)
2006
1st in Stage 3 Vuelta a Mendoza (ARG)
1st in Stage 1 part a Vuelta Ciclista Lider al Sur, Castro (CHI)
1st in Stage 3 part a Vuelta Ciclista Lider al Sur, Valdivia (CHI)
2nd in Stage 4 Vuelta Ciclista Lider al Sur, Pucon (CHI)
3rd in Stage 8 part a Vuelta Ciclista Lider al Sur, Curico (CHI)
(bronze) in Chile National Championship, Road, Elite, Chile (CHI)
1st in Stage 8 Vuelta al Estado Zulia (VEN)
2007
1st in Stage 5 Vuelta de Atacama, Copiapo (CHI)
6th in Championship world B Capetwon Sudafrica
