= Vuelta por un Chile Líder =

Men's professional road bicycle racing stage race

Vuelta Ciclista Por Un Chile Líder
Race details
- Date: February/March
- Region: Chile
- English name: Lider Tour of Chile
- Local name(s): Vuelta Ciclista Líder
- Discipline: Road
- Competition: Standalone: 1997–2004; UCI America Tour: 2005–07
- Type: Stage race

History
- First edition: 1997
- Editions: 11
- Final edition: 2007
- First winner: José Medina (CHI)
- Most wins: Edgardo Simón (ARG) (3 wins)
- Final winner: Andrei Sartassov (RUS)

The Vuelta Ciclista Por Un Chile Líder (Vuelta Líder) was an elite men's professional road bicycle racing stage race held annually in Chile. The Vuelta Líder was created in 1997 by Líder, the largest supermarket chain in Chile, and was sanctioned by the Chilean Cycling Federation (Federación Ciclista de Chile). The last race was held in 2007. The Vuelta Líder was one of the largest cycling races in Chile. When the UCI Continental Circuits were created in 2005, the Vuelta Ciclista Por Un Chile Líder was added to the UCI America Tour schedule.

== List of winners ==
Year	Winner	Nation	Team
1997	José Medina	Chile	Unión Ciclista Curicó
1998	Pablo González	Chile	Providencia
1999	Víctor Garrido	Chile	Deportes Concepción
2000	Juan Manual	Chile	FierroEkono
2001	Jorge Giacinti	Argentina	Transportes Romero
2002	Edgardo Simón	Argentina	Publiguías Bianchi
2003	Marco Arriagada	Chile	Publiguías Bianchi
2004	Edgardo Simón (2)	Argentina	Líder-La Polar
2005	Edgardo Simón (3)	Argentina	Líder
2006	Andrei Sartassov	Russia	Líder-Presto Chile
2007	Andrei Sartassov (2)	Russia	Líder
