= Luís Pinheiro =

Portuguese footballer

Personal information
- Full name: Luís Carlos Ventura Pinheiro
- Date of birth: 8 January 2000 (age 26)
- Place of birth: Vila Viçosa, Portugal
- Height: 1.75 m (5 ft 9 in)
- Position: Right-back

Team information
- Current team: Louletano
- Number: 23

Youth career
- 2009–2011: O Calipolense
- 2011–2020: Benfica

Senior career*
Years	Team	Apps	(Gls)
2019–2020	Benfica B	2	(0)
2020–2023	Varzim	21	(0)
2022–2023	→ Moncarapachense (loan)	15	(0)
2023–2024	Pêro Pinheiro	19	(0)
2024–2025	Oliveira do Hospital	15	(0)
2025–	Louletano	8	(0)

International career
2015	Portugal U15	2	(0)
2016	Portugal U16	5	(0)
- * Club domestic league appearances and goals as of 00:12, 10 March 2024 (UTC)

Luís Carlos Ventura Pinheiro (born 8 January 2000) is a Portuguese professional footballer who plays as a right-back for Campeonato de Portugal club Louletano.

== Career statistics ==
=== Club ===
As of match played 22 April 2023

Appearances and goals by club, season and competition
Club	Season	League			National cup		League cup		Total	
Club	Season	Division	Apps	Goals	Apps	Goals	Apps	Goals	Apps	Goals
Benfica B	2019–20	LigaPro	2	0	—		—		2	0
Varzim	2020–21	Liga Portugal 2	9	0	0	0	—		9	0
Varzim	2021–22	Liga Portugal 2	12	0	3	0	1	0	16	0
Varzim	Total		21	0	3	0	1	0	25	0
Moncarapachense (loan)	2022–23	Liga 3	15	0	1	0	—		16	0
Pêro Pinheiro	2023–24	Liga 3	0	0	0	0	—		0	0
Career total			38	0	4	0	1	0	43	0
