= Néstor Pías =

Uruguayan cyclist

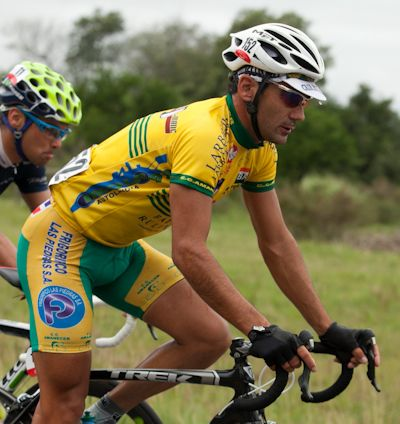
- Pías in 2012

Personal information
- Full name: Néstor Fabián Pías Torres
- Born: 7 March 1981 (age 45) Montevideo, Uruguay

Cycling career
- Sport: Cycling
- Discipline: Road
- Role: Rider

Amateur teams
- 2000–2001: General Hornos
- 2002: Juventud
- 2003–2005: Alas Rojas de Santa Lucía
- 2006–2013: CC Amanecer
- 2014–2017: Schneck–Alas Rojas
- 2017–2019: Ciudad del Plata

Néstor Fabián Pías Torres (born March 7, 1981, in Montevideo) is a Uruguayan track and road cyclist.

== Major results ==
2000
1st Overall Vuelta Ciclista de la Juventud
2004
5th Overall Vuelta del Uruguay

1st Stage 3

2005
1st Stage 8 Rutas de América
5th Overall Vuelta del Uruguay
8th Time trial, Pan American Road Championships
2006
1st Overall Vuelta del Uruguay

1st Stage 4

2nd Overall Vuelta al Chana
6th Overall Vuelta Ciclista de Chile
2008
1st Stage 8 Rutas de América
2nd Overall Vuelta del Uruguay
3rd Overall Prueba CC Champagnat Sprinter
3rd Apertura Temporada del Uruguay
5th Overall Tour Canario

1st Stage 2

2009
4th Overall Rutas de América
4th Overall Volta de Ciclismo Internacional do Estado de São Paulo
2011
2nd Overall Rutas de América

1st Stage 2

2012
6th Overall Vuelta del Uruguay
2013
National Road Championships

2nd Time trial
2nd Road race

2014
1st Time trial, National Road Championships
2015
1st Time trial, National Road Championships
6th Overall Vuelta del Uruguay
2016
1st Overall Vuelta del Uruguay

1st Stages 3a (TTT) & 7 (ITT)

2017
9th Overall Vuelta del Uruguay
