= Gonzalo Salas =

Argentine cyclist

Personal information
- Born: December 6, 1974 (age 51)

Cycling career
- Sport: Cycling
- Disciplines: Track, road
- Role: Rider

Gonzalo Edgardo Salas (born December 6, 1974) is a male track and road cyclist from Argentina.

== Career ==
1998
1st in General Classification Vuelta a San Juan (ARG)
2000
2nd in Prologue Vuelta a la Argentina (ARG)
2nd in Stage 9 Vuelta a la Argentina, San Juan (ARG)
1st in Stage 12 Vuelta a la Argentina, Alta Gracia (ARG)
2001
(bronze) in National Championship, Road, Individual Time Trial, Elite (ARG)
2002
1st in General Classification Vuelta Ciclista de Chile (CHI)
2003
3rd in Stage 3 part b Vuelta Ciclista de Chile, Talca (CHI)
5th in General Classification Vuelta Ciclista de Chile (CHI)
2004
2nd in Stage 3 Volta do Rio de Janeiro, Nova Friburgo (BRA)
4th in General Classification Vuelta Ciclista de Chile (CHI)
2005
2nd in Stage 8 Vuelta a San Juan (ARG)
3rd in General Classification Ascensión a los Nevados de Chillán (CHI)
2nd in Prologue Vuelta Ciclista de Chile, Ciudad de Talca (CHI)
3rd in Stage 3 Vuelta Ciclista de Chile, Farellones (CHI)
2nd in General Classification Vuelta Ciclista de Chile (CHI)
2006
3rd in General Classification Ascensión a los Nevados de Chillán (CHI)
