= Alvaro Alvarez =

Australian artist

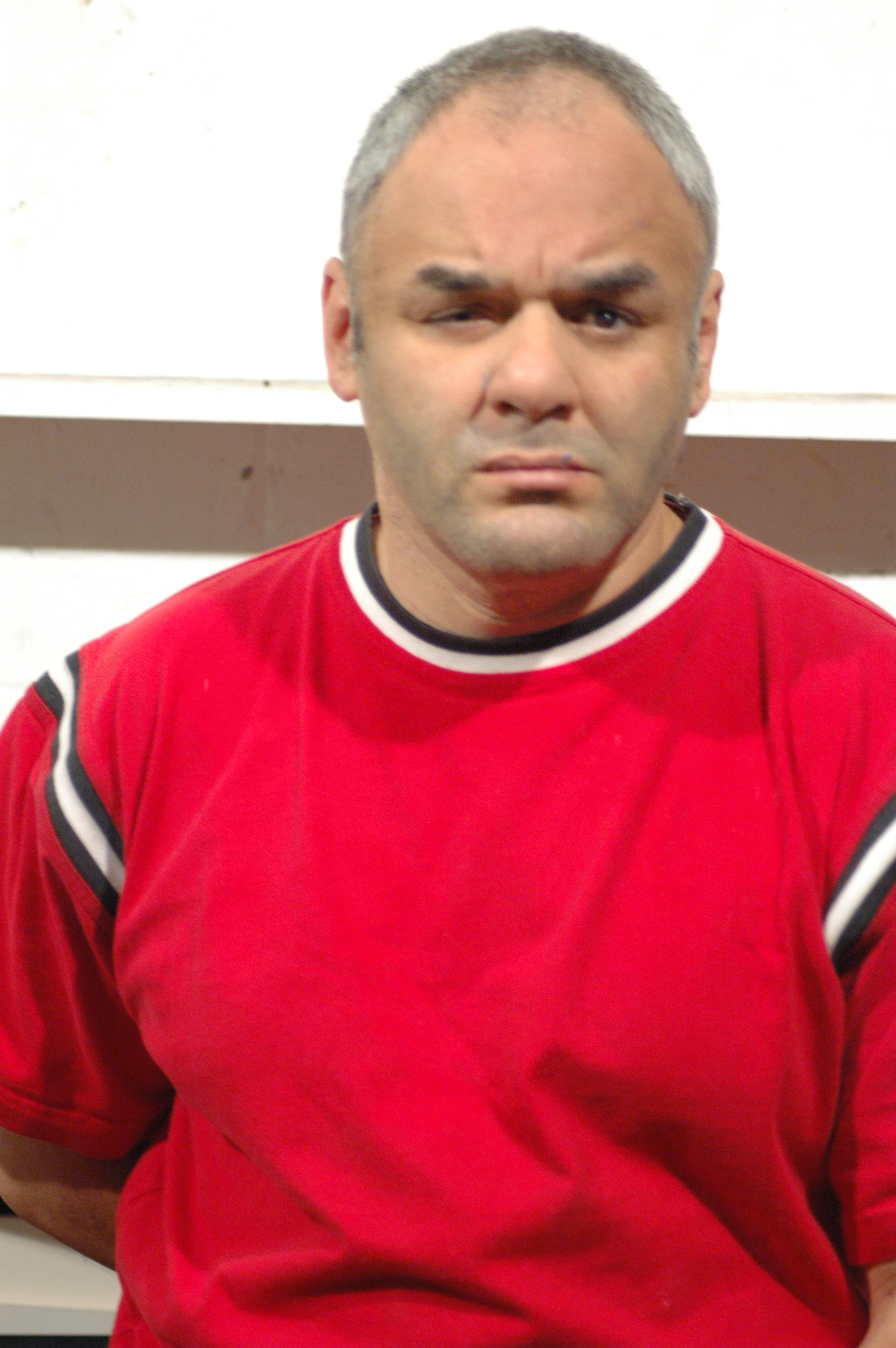
Alvaro Alvarez in 2009

Alvaro Alvarez (born San Jose, Costa Rica, 1965) is an artist, working primarily as a painter. He is based in Melbourne, Australia.

== Career, themes and style ==
Alvaro Alvarez's recent work combines painting and drawing, based on images from books, magazines and old calendars. After careful examination of this content, Alvarez recreates the imagery in his paintings using a methodical process of fine brushwork and soft lines. Layers of these techniques are often visible on the surface of a finished work where Alvarez has erased evidence of early mark making to begin again, giving the artworks an ethereal quality. As the Sydney Morning Herald writes of Alvarez's practice, "Alvaro Alvarez creates rippling, vibrant paint and texta abstractions from images found online."

Alvarez has exhibited his work internationally and throughout Australia and currently practices at Melbourne studio Arts Project Australia. Alvarez is an important figure in Australian outsider art and has exhibited his works across Melbourne Arts Centre, the Museum of Everything in London and Campbelltown Arts Centre and Monash University Museum of Art.

== Solo exhibitions ==
2005

Alvaro Going Solo, Arts Project Australia Gallery, Melbourne

== Selected group exhibitions ==
2016

Signature Style, Arts Project Australia, Melbourne

Tell 'em I'm dead, Arts Project Australia, Melbourne

2015

It takes more than 140 characters to write a novel, Arts Project Australia, Melbourne

Home, locations around Melbourne Arts Centre, Melbourne

2014

Renegades: Outsider Art, The Arts Centre Gold Coast, Surfers Paradise

Darebin Art Show, Bundoora Homestead Art Centre, Bundoora

2013

Repeat. Restate…Reiterate, Arts Project Australia Gallery, Melbourne

Walking the Line, Arts Project Australia Gallery, Melbourne

2011

Exhibition #4, Museum of Everything, London

Moving Galleries, Flinders Street Station, Melbourne

2010

Melbourne Art Fair 2010, Royal Exhibition Building, Melbourne

2009

Snapshot, ACGA Gallery, Federation Square, Melbourne

2008

Pearls of Arts Project Australia - The Stuart Purves Collection, Ivan Dougherty

Gallery, College of Fine Arts, UNSW, Sydney

Without Borders: Outsider Art in an Antipodean Context, Monash University

Museum of Art, Melbourne, and Campbelltown Arts Centre, Sydney

2005

Phyllis Kind Gallery, New York

Home Sweet Home: Works from the Peter Fay Collection, National Gallery of Australia Travelling exhibition: Tamworth City Gallery, Tamworth NSW, Dunedin Public Art Gallery, New Zealand

2004

2nd Annual Intuit Show of Folk and Outsider Art, Chicago, United States Hosted by the Phyllis Kind Gallery, New York

2001

Face-Up, Idiom Studio, Wellington, New Zealand

== Collections ==
Alvaro Alvarez's work is represented in private collections as well as in the National Gallery of Victoria, the Stuart Purves Collection and the National Gallery of Australia.
