= Luis Fernando Sepúlveda =

Chilean cyclist (born 1974)

Personal information
- Born: 8 April 1974 (age 52) Curicó, Chile

Sport
- Sport: Cycling
Medal record
Representing Chile
Men's track cycling
Pan American Games
Gold medal – first place	2003 Santo Dommingo	Team pursuit
Gold medal – first place	2007 Río de Janeiro	Team pursuit
Silver medal – second place	2011 Guadalajara	Team pursuit
Pan American Championships
Gold medal – first place	2002 Quito	Madison
Gold medal – first place	2002 Quito	Team pursuit
Gold medal – first place	2005 Mar del Plata	Team pursuit
Gold medal – first place	2006 São Paulo	Team pursuit
Gold medal – first place	2012 Mar del Plata	Team pursuit
Gold medal – first place	2015 Santiago	Points race
Silver medal – second place	2002 Quito	Points race
Silver medal – second place	2005 Mar del Plata	Madison
Silver medal – second place	2006 São Paulo	Madison
Silver medal – second place	2007 Valencia	Madison
Silver medal – second place	2008 Montevideo	Madison
Silver medal – second place	2011 Medellin	Team pursuit
Bronze medal – third place	2015 Santiago	Madison
Bronze medal – third place	2015 Santiago	Team pursuit
Bronze medal – third place	2017 Couva	Team pursuit

Luis Fernando Sepúlveda Villar (born 8 April 1974) is a male professional track and road racing cyclist from Chile. He won a gold medal for his native country at the 2007 Pan American Games in Rio de Janeiro, Brazil. He also competed at the 1996 Summer Olympics and the 2000 Summer Olympics.

== Career ==
1998
1st in Stage 8 part b Vuelta Ciclista de Chile (CHI)
6th in General Classification Vuelta Ciclista de Chile (CHI)
1999
1st in General Classification Vuelta Ciclista de Chile (CHI)
2nd in Frisco, Points Race, Frisco, Texas (USA)
2000
2nd in Prologue Vuelta Ciclista de Chile, Vitacura (CHI)
2nd in Stage 3 Vuelta Ciclista de Chile, El Tabo (CHI)
3rd in Stage 4 Vuelta Ciclista de Chile, Los Maitenes (CHI)
2nd in Stage 7-b Vuelta Ciclista de Chile, Chillán (CHI)
1st in General Classification Vuelta Ciclista de Chile (CHI)
2nd in General Classification Volta Ciclistica Internacional de Santa Catarina (BRA)
2001
3rd in Chile National Championship, Road, Individual Time Trial, Chile (CHI)
1st in Prologue Vuelta Ciclista de Chile, Puerto Montt (CHI)
7th in General Classification Vuelta Ciclista de Chile (CHI)
2002
(gold) in Pan American Championships, Track, Madison, Quito (ECU)
(gold) in Pan American Championships, Track, Team Pursuit, Quito (ECU)
(silver) in Pan American Championships, Track, Point Race, Quito (ECU)
1st in Stage 1 Vuelta Ciclista de Chile, Pucon (CHI)
4th in General Classification Vuelta Ciclista de Chile (CHI)
2003
2nd in Stage 4 Volta do Rio de Janeiro, Niteroi (BRA)
6th in General Classification Vuelta Ciclista de Chile (CHI)
(gold) in Pan American Games, Track, Team Pursuit, Santo Domingo (DOM)
2004
1st in Stage 7 Vuelta Ciclista de Chile, Villa Alemana (CHI)
3rd in UCI Track Cycling World Cup, Points Race, Moscow (RUS)
2005
(gold) in Pan American Championships, Track, Team Pursuit, Mar del Plata (ARG)

alongside Marco Arriagada, Enzo Cesario, and Gonzalo Miranda

(silver) in Pan American Championships, Track, Madison, Mar del Plata (ARG)
2006
2nd in Chile National Championship, Road, Individual Time Trial, Chile (CHI)
2nd in Chile National Championship, Road, Chile (CHI)
3rd in Stage 3 Vuelta Ciclista de Chile, San Esteban (CHI)
3rd in General Classification Vuelta Ciclista de Chile (CHI)
2nd in Stage 2 Vuelta a Costa Rica, Playas del Coco (CRC)
3rd in Stage 3 Vuelta a Costa Rica, Finca La Ponderosa (CRC)
2nd in Stage 7 Vuelta a Costa Rica, Belén (CRC)
(gold) in Pan American Championships, Track, Team Pursuit, Sao Paulo (BRA)
(silver) in Pan American Championships, Track, Madison, Sao Paulo (BRA)
2007
3rd in Stage 4 Vuelta Ciclista Lider al Sur, Cañete (CHI)
(silver) in Pan American Championships, Track, Madison, Valencia (VEN)
(gold) in Pan American Games, Track, Team Pursuit, Rio de Janeiro (BRA)

alongside Marco Arriagada, Enzo Cesario, and Gonzalo Miranda

3rd in Stage 5 Vuelta a Sucre, Monumento (VEN)
2008
3rd in Stage 3 Vuelta a Mendoza, San Martín (ARG)
3rd in Chile National Championship, Road, Individual Time Trial, Chile (CHI)
1st in Stage 1 Vuelta a Bolivia, Santa Cruz (BOL)
2nd in Stage 2 Vuelta a Bolivia, Mineros (BOL)
3rd in Stage 3 Vuelta a Bolivia, Villa Tunari (BOL)
2nd in Stage 1 Vuelta ciclista a la Republica del Ecuador, Tulcan (ECU)
1st in Stage 4 Vuelta ciclista a la Republica del Ecuador, Ambato (ECU)
5th in Stage 6 Vuelta ciclista a la Republica del Ecuador, Milagro (ECU)
2nd in Stage 7 Vuelta ciclista a la Republica del Ecuador, Quevedo (ECU)
4th in Stage 8 Vuelta ciclista a la Republica del Ecuador, Santo Domingo (ECU)
2nd in Stage 9 Vuelta ciclista a la Republica del Ecuador, Quito (ECU)
2009
2nd in Vuelta de la Leche, Puerto Octay (CHI)
1st in Stage 1 Vuelta a la Independencia Nacional, Santo Domingo (DOM)
1st in Stage 2 Vuelta a la Independencia Nacional, Santo Domingo (DOM)
1st in General Classification Vuelta a la Independencia Nacional (DOM)
2nd in Juegos del Alba, Road, Individual Time Trial
1st in Stage 1 Volta Ciclistica Internacional do Paraná, Bela Vista do Paraiso (BRA)
7th in Pan American Championships, Road, Individual Time Trial
2nd in Prologue Tour de l'Amitié de Tahiti (PYF)
2nd in Stage 2 Tour de l'Amitié de Tahiti, Col d'Erima (PYF)
1st in Stage 3 Tour de l'Amitié de Tahiti, Pirae (PYF)
1st in Stage 5 part b Tour de l'Amitié de Tahiti, Taiarapu (PYF)

alongside Gonzalo Garrido, Patricio Almonacid, and Cristobal Gómez

1st in Stage 6 Tour de l'Amitié de Tahiti, Mahini (PYF)
1st in Stage 7 part b Tour de l'Amitié de Tahiti, Taiarapu (PYF)
2nd in General Classification Tour de l'Amitié de Tahiti (PYF)
2010
1st Chile National Road Race Champion
