= Anton Villatoro =

Guatemalan cyclist

Personal information
- Born: June 10, 1970 (age 55); Boulder, Colorado, United States
- Home town: Guatemala City, Guatemala

Sport
- Sport: Cycling

Anton Villatoro (born June 10, 1970) is a Guatemalan former professional cyclist. He attended the University of Colorado, where he raced with future US Postal teammate Tyler Hamilton. Villatoro won the 1991 Junior Tour of Guatemala, a gold medal at the 1994 Central American Games (team time trial) and placed fourth at the 1995 Pan American Games (time trial). In 1996, he represented Guatemala at the Olympic Games in Atlanta.

He raced for the US Postal Service Cycling Team from 1996–1998 and then served as team captain for Team 7-UP from 1999 to 2000.

He retired in 2001 to pursue business interests.
