= Darío Ramírez =

Spanish footballer (born 2005)

Personal information
- Full name: Darío Ramírez Ramírez
- Date of birth: 14 January 2005 (age 21)
- Place of birth: Haría, Spain
- Height: 1.75 m (5 ft 9 in)
- Position: Winger

Team information
- Current team: Gimnàstic

Youth career
- Lomo
- Orientación Marítima
- 2020–2023: Real Sociedad

Senior career*
Years	Team	Apps	(Gls)
2023–2025	Real Sociedad C	32	(1)
2023	→ Touring (loan)	13	(2)
2023–2026	Real Sociedad B	35	(0)
2026–	Gimnàstic	0	(0)
- * Club domestic league appearances and goals as of 9 June 2026

Darío Ramírez Ramírez (born 14 January 2005) is a Spanish footballer who plays as a winger for Gimnàstic de Tarragona.

== Career ==
Born in Haría, Lanzarote, Canary Islands, Ramírez played for local sides CD Lomo and CD Orientación Marítima before joining Real Sociedad's youth sides in June 2020. In January 2023, he was loaned to Tercera Federación side Touring KE for the remainder of the season.

Upon returning to the Txuri-urdin in July 2023, Ramírez was assigned to the C-team in Segunda Federación, and first appeared with the reserves on 17 December, coming on as a late substitute for Iñaki Rupérez in a 2–2 Primera Federación home draw against Real Unión. On 14 April of the following year, he renewed his contract until 2027.

Regularly used with Sanse during the 2024–25 campaign, Ramírez featured in 29 matches overall as the club achieved promotion to Segunda División. In July 2025, he agreed to a move to Real Madrid's C-team, but the deal later collapsed.

Ramírez made his professional debut on 11 October 2025, replacing goalscorer Gorka Carrera in a 3–0 home win over FC Andorra. The following 9 July, after being rarely used, he moved to Gimnàstic de Tarragona in the third division on a two-year contract.
