= Alejandro Acton =

Argentine cyclist

Personal information
- Full name: Alejandro José Acton
- Born: June 3, 1972 (age 54) Buenos Aires, Argentina

Cycling career
- Sport: Cycling
- Current team: Colavita-Sutter Home
- Discipline: Road
- Role: Rider

Professional teams
- 2006: Targetraining
- 2007: Colavita-Sutter Home

Alejandro José Acton (born June 3, 1972) is an Argentine professional racing cyclist.

== Career highlights ==
1998
1st, Stage 9, Vuelta Ciclista del Uruguay
2000
2nd, Overall, Rutas de America
2001
2nd, Overall, Vuelta Ciclista del Uruguay
2002
1st, Stage 2, Rutas de America, Treinta y Tres
3rd, Overall, Vuelta Ciclista del Uruguay

1st, Stages 7 & 10 (Salto & Montevideo)

2003
1st, Stage 6, Vuelta Ciclista de Chile, San Antonio
2004
1st, Prologue, Stages 5 & 6 Tour de Korea (Seoul & Yang Yang (2x))
2nd, Murraysville
3rd, Somerset
2005
1st, Stage 3, Green Mountain Stage race, Voler Burlington Criterium
2nd, GP Mengoni
3rd, Overall, Vuelta Ciclista del Uruguay

1st, Stages 1 & 8 (Piriapolis & Trinidad)

3rd, Athens
2006
1st, Garrett Lemire Memorial GP
1st, Bethel
1st, Visalia
2nd, Amgen Classic
3rd, Kelly Cup
2008
1st, Overall, Vuelta al Chana

1st, Stage 3 (Cheveste)
