= Jorge Giacinti =

Argentine cyclist (born 1974)

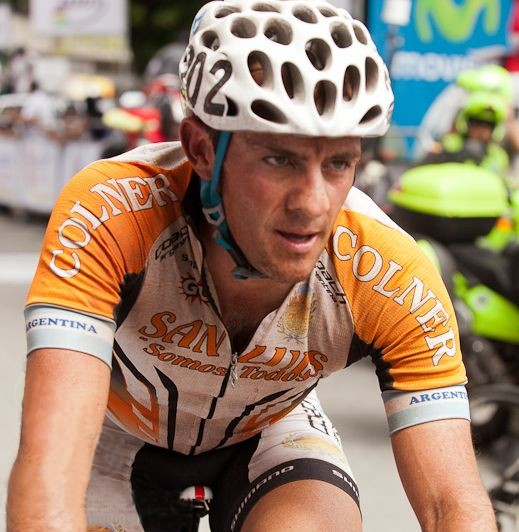

Personal information
- Full name: Jorge Giacinti
- Born: 21 June 1974 (age 52) Almafuerte, Córdoba, Argentina

Cycling career
- Sport: Cycling
- Current team: Retired
- Discipline: Road
- Role: Rider

Amateur teams
- 2000: Bianchi
- 2002: Amaru
- 2003–2004: Publiguías
- 2004: Villa Teresa
- 2004: José Palma-Argentina
- 2005: Flamengo FC Memorial
- 2006: Relax
- 2006–2007: Team Lider Presto
- 2009: Scott–Marcondes Cesar–São José dos Campos
- 2010–2011: OGM
- 2016–2018: Mirasal
- 2019–2025: CC Cerro Largo

Professional teams
- 2008: Scott–Marcondes Cesar–São José dos Campos
- 2010: Scott–Marcondes Cesar–São José dos Campos
- 2012–2015: San Luis Somos Todos

Major wins
- National Road Race Championships (1997, 1999)

Jorge Alberto Giacinti (born 21 June 1974 in Almafuerte, Córdoba) is a former track and road cyclist from Argentina.

== Major results ==
1997
1st Road race, National Road Championships
1998
1st Overall Vuelta del Uruguay
1999
1st Road race, National Road Championships
1st Overall Vuelta al Valle
2001
1st Overall Vuelta Ciclista Lider al Sur
2002
1st Stage 4 Volta do Rio de Janeiro
2003
3rd Overall Vuelta Ciclista de Chile
2004
1st Overall Vuelta Ciclista del Uruguay
1st Stage 1 Volta do Rio de Janeiro
2nd Overall Vuelta a San Juan
2005
1st Overall Volta de Ciclismo Internacional do Estado de São Paulo

1st Stage 6

1st Overall Volta de Porto Alegre

1st Stage 3

2006
2nd Overall Vuelta Ciclista de Chile
2nd Overall Volta do Paraná
3rd Overall Vuelta Ciclista Lider al Sur

1st Stage 3b (TTT)

3rd Overall Vuelta al Valle
2007
1st Overall Vuelta a Perú

1st Stages 1, 2, 3 & 5

1st Overall Tour de San Luis

1st Stage 3

1st Stage 6a Vuelta al Valle
2nd Overall Vuelta Ciclista Lider al Sur

1st Stage 2b

2008
1st Stage 3 Vuelta del Uruguay
3rd Time trial, National Road Championships
3rd Overall Tour de San Luis
2009
2nd Overall Tour de San Luis

1st Stage 3

3rd Overall Giro del Sol San Juan

1st Stage 2

2013
Vuelta a Bolivia

1st Stages 3 (TTT) & 4

2014
National Road Championships

2nd Road race
3rd Time trial

2016
2nd Road race, National Road Championships
2022
1st Overall Rutas de América

1st Prologue & Stage 8

1st Stages 3 & 4 Vuelta Ciclista Chaná
2023
1st Overall Vuelta del Uruguay
2nd Overall Rutas de América

1st Stage 8
