= Andrei Sartassov =

Russian-born Chilean cyclist

Personal information
- Full name: Andrei Sartassov
- Born: 10 November 1975 (age 50) Rybno-Slobodsky District, Tatarstan, Soviet Union

Cycling career
- Sport: Cycling
- Current team: Retired
- Discipline: Road
- Role: Rider

Amateur teams
- 2000: Sport Lisboa e Benfica
- 2001–2002: Lider Ariel
- 2003: Lider Trek Bio-Bio
- 2004: Doñihue–Skippy
- 2004: DataRO/Blumenau
- 2004–2007: Equipo Lider–La Polar
- 2006: Selle Italia–Diquigiovanni (stagiaire)
- 2010: OGM

Professional teams
- 2010: Scott–Marcondes Cesar–São José dos Campos
- 2012–2015: San Luis Somos Todos
- 2016–2017: Sindicato de Empleados Publicos de San Juan

Andrei Sartassov (born 10 November 1975) is a Russian-born Chilean former professional road racing cyclist. In 2009 it was revealed that he, along with his Chilean teammate Juan Francisco Cabrera Torres, had tested positive in 2007 for EPO during the Vuelta de Chile.

== Major results ==
2001
1st Stage 4 Doble Copacabana GP Fides
2nd Overall Vuelta de Chile
2002
1st Stage 4b Doble Copacabana GP Fides
7th Overall Vuelta Ciclista de Chile

1st Stages 9 & 11

2003
1st Stage 6b Doble Copacabana GP Fides
2004
1st Stage 6b Vuelta Ciclista de Chile
1st Stage 7 Volta Ciclistica Internacional de Santa Catarina
2nd Overall Vuelta por un Chile Líder
2005
1st Stage 1 Vuelta a San Juan
5th Overall Vuelta Ciclista de Chile
2006
1st Overall Vuelta Ciclista de Chile

1st Stages 3 & 8a

1st Overall Vuelta por un Chile Líder

1st Stages 3b (TTT), 5 & 8b

1st Stage 6b Doble Copacabana GP Fides
2nd Overall Vuelta a Mendoza

1st Stage 1

3rd Overall UCI America Tour
2007
1st Overall Vuelta por un Chile Líder

1st Stages 2b (TTT), 7b & 8

2nd Overall Vuelta a Peru

1st Stages 5 (TTT), 7 & 8

1st Stage 7 Vuelta a Mendoza
