= Víctor Garrido =

Chilean cyclist

Personal information
- Born: 5 September 1971 (age 55)

Cycling career
- Sport: Cycling

Víctor Garrido (born 5 September 1971), also known as Victor Garrido Zenteno, is a Chilean cyclist. He competed in the men's individual road race at the 1996 Summer Olympics. He completed 111 km, but did not finish (DNF) the race. He has also participated in the Vuelta de Chile stage race in 2000 and 2003, with a best finish of 21st place in 2000. He participated in the Tour do Rio (Brazil) in 2002, finishing in 4th place.
