= Cristóbal Silva =

Chilean cyclist (born 1979)

Personal information
- Full name: Cristóbal Mauricio Silva Ibaceta
- Born: 12 October 1979 (age 47) Santiago, Chile
- Height: 1.77 m (5 ft 10 in)
- Weight: 69 kg (152 lb)

Cycling career
- Sport: Cycling
- Discipline: Mountain biking
- Role: Rider
- Rider type: Cross-country

Cristóbal Mauricio Silva Ibaceta (born 12 October 1979 in Santiago) is a Chilean amateur mountain biker. He has won five Chilean national championship titles in men's mountain biking, and also represented his nation Chile in two editions of the Olympic Games (2004 and 2008).

Silva spotted officially on his major international debut at the 2004 Summer Olympics in Athens, where he scored a fortieth place in the men's cross-country race with only a single lap left to complete.

At the 2008 Summer Olympics in Beijing, Silva qualified for his second Chilean squad in the men's cross-country race by receiving an automatic berth from the Chilean Cycling Federation (Spanish: Federación Ciclista de Chile) and the Union Cycliste Internationale (UCI), based on his best performance at the World and Pan American Championships and at the Mountain Biking World Series. Silva could not upgrade again a complete cross-country distance from his ride in Athens, as he ended his course with only two laps to go and a thirty-sixth-place finish.
