= Edgardo Simón =

Argentine cyclist

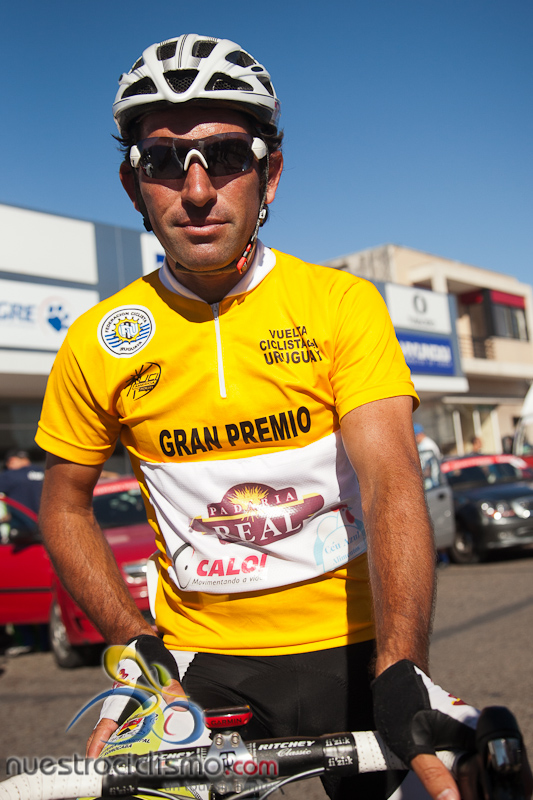

Personal information
- Full name: Edgardo Simón
- Born: 16 December 1974 (age 51) Corrientes, Argentina

Cycling career
- Sport: Cycling
- Current team: Ironage-Colner
- Disciplines: Road and track
- Role: Rider

Amateur teams
- 2000–2002: Toledo
- 2003: Ekono Alamo Rent A
- 2004–2005: Lider Presto
- 2009: Scott–Marcondes Cesar–São José dos Campos
- 2011: Padaria Real/Calói/Céu Azul Alimentos
- 2013: Ironage-Colner

Professional teams
- 2005–2007: Colombia–Selle Italia
- 2008: Scott–Marcondes Cesar–São José dos Campos
- 2010: Funvic–Pindamonhangaba
- 2012: Real Cycling Team

Major wins
- UCI America Tour (2005)
Medal record
Men's road bicycle racing
Representing Argentina
Pan American Championships
| Gold medal – first place | 2005 Mar del Plata | Time trial |

Edgardo Simón (born December 16, 1974) is an Argentine professional track and road bicycle racer. He rides for the Ironage-Colner squad, having previously competed for the Real Cycling Team on the UCI America Tour. In 2005, Simon won the UCI America Tour. In 2010 he was granted the Konex Award Merit Diploma as one of the five best cyclist of the last decade in Argentina.

Simon competed for Argentina at the 2000 Summer Olympics in track cycling in the Men's Team Pursuit event.

== Major achievements ==
1997

- 1st Overall Vuelta al Valle -Arg- (ARG)

1998

- 2nd in Cali, Team Pursuit, Cali (COL)

2000 – Toledo (TOL) Argentina

- 3rd (Bronze) – World Track Cycling Championships (Men's Madison 60 km)
- 1st in National Championship, Road, ITT, Elite, Argentina, Bahía Blanca (ARG)
- 1st in General Classification Vuelta a Mendoza (ARG)

2001 – Toledo (TOL) Argentina

- 1st – Clásica del Oeste-Doble Bragado
- 1st Apertura Temporada Argentina, Avellaneda (ARG)
- 1st Overall Vuelta a Mendoza (ARG)
- 1st Overall Vuelta de San Juan (ARG)
- 2nd in National Championship, Road, Elite, Argentina (ARG)
- 1st in National Championship, Road, ITT, Elite, Argentina (ARG)
- 1st in Pan American Championships, Track, Pursuit, Elite, Medellin (COL)

2002 – Toledo (TOL) Argentina

- 1st (Gold) – South American Games (Men's road race, 140 km)
- 1st (Gold) – South American Games (Men's Individual Pursuit)
- 1st Overall – Vuelta Ciclista por un Chile Lider (2.2)
- 3rd (Bronze) – World Track Cycling Championships (Men's Madison 60 km)
- 3rd Overall – Vuelta Ciclista de Chile
- 2nd 2nd in Monterrey, Madison (MEX)

2003 – Ekono Alamo Rent A (EKO) Chile

- 1st (Gold) – Pan American Games (Men's 4000m individual pursuit)
- 4th Overall – Vuelta Ciclista de Chile
- 1st in Stage 7 Vuelta de San Juan, Jachal (ARG)
- 1st in Stage 9 Vuelta de San Juan, San Juan (ARG)
- 1st in Prologue Vuelta Ciclista de Chile, Conception (CHI)
- 1st in Stage 1 Vuelta Ciclista de Chile, Chillan (CHI)
- 1st in Stage 3 part b Vuelta Ciclista de Chile, Talca (CHI)
- 1st in Stage 8 Vuelta Ciclista de Chile, Limache (CHI)
- 2nd in National Championship, Track, Pursuit, Elite/U23, Argentina, Cordoba (ARG)
- 1st in Stage 5 Vuelta al Valle -Arg-, Catriel (ARG)

2004 – LIDER-PRESTO (LID) Chile

- 1st in Stage 9 Vuelta de San Juan (ARG)
- 3rd in General Classification Vuelta de San Juan (ARG)
- 1st in Prologue Vuelta Ciclista Lider al Sur, Costanera Puerto Montt (CHI)
- 1st in Stage 5 Vuelta Ciclista Lider al Sur, Canete (CHI)
- 1st in General Classification Vuelta Ciclista Lider al Sur (CHI)
- 1st in Stage 4 part b Vuelta Ciclista de Chile, Curicó (CHI)
- 1st in Stage 6 part a Vuelta Ciclista de Chile, La Estrella (CHI)
- 1st in Stage 8 Vuelta Ciclista de Chile, Los Andes (CHI)
- 3rd in National Championship, Track, Points race, Elite/U23, Argentina, Mar del Plata (ARG)
- 1st in Stage 1 Vuelta a Guatemala, Zacapa (GUA)
- 1st in Stage 6 Vuelta a Guatemala, Retalhuleu (GUA)

2005 – LIDER-PRESTO (LID) Chile – Colombia – Selle Italia (CSI) Colombia

- Champion – UCI America Tour
- 1st in Stage 5 Vuelta de San Juan (ARG)
- 1st in Stage 2 Ascensión a los Nevados de Chillán, Puente El Ala (CHI)
- 2nd in General Classification Ascensión a los Nevados de Chillán (CHI)
- 1st in Stage 3 Vuelta Ciclista Lider al Sur, Osorno (CHI)
- 1st in Stage 4 part b Vuelta Ciclista Lider al Sur, Máfil (CHI)
- 1st in Stage 6 Vuelta Ciclista Lider al Sur, Los Angeles (CHI)
- 1st in General Classification Vuelta Ciclista Lider al Sur (CHI)
- 1st in Prologue Vuelta Ciclista de Chile, Ciudad de Talca (CHI)
- 1st in Stage 1 part b Vuelta Ciclista de Chile, Curicó (CHI)
- 1st in Stage 4 Vuelta Ciclista de Chile, Algarrobo (CHI)
- 1st in General Classification Vuelta Ciclista de Chile (CHI)
- 1st in Pan American Championships, Road, ITT, Elite, Mar Del Plata
- 1st in Pan American Championships, Track, Pursuit, Elite, Mar del Plata
- 2nd in Pan American Championships, Track, Team Pursuit, Elite, Mae del Plata
- 1st in General Classification UCI America Tour

2006 – Sella Italia-Serramenti Diquigiovanni (SEL) Colombia

- 2nd in General Classification Ascensión a los Nevados de Chillán (CHI)
- 1st in Stage 2 Vuelta a Mendoza, Tumuyan (ARG)
- 1st in Prologue Vuelta Ciclista Lider al Sur, Achao (CHI)

2007 – Serramenti PVC Diquigiovanni – Selle Italia (SER) Colombia

- 1st in Stage 6 Rutas de America, Fray Bentos (URU)
- 1st in Prologue Vuelta Ciclista Lider al Sur, Puerto Varas (CHI)
- 1st in Stage 4 Vuelta Ciclista Lider al Sur, Cañete (CHI)
- 1st in Stage 5 Vuelta Ciclista Lider al Sur, Concepcion (CHI)
- 1st in Stage 6 Vuelta Ciclista Lider al Sur, Talca (CHI)

2008 – Scott – Marcondes Cesar – Sao José dos Campos (SCO) Brazil

- 1st in Stage 10 Vuelta Ciclista del Uruguay, Sarandí Grande (URU)
- 3rd in National Championship, Road, Elite, Argentina (ARG)
- 1st in Stage 1 Volta de Ciclismo Internacional do Estado de São Paulo, Interlagos (BRA)
- 1st in Stage 2 Volta de Ciclismo Internacional do Estado de São Paulo, São Carlos (BRA)
- 1st in Stage 4 Volta de Ciclismo Internacional do Estado de São Paulo, Ribeirão (BRA)
- 2nd in Prova São Salvador (BRA)
- 3rd in Volta Do ABC Paulista (BRA)
- 4th in Camaras Colla (ARG)
- 1st in Stage 3 Vuelta a Bolivia, Villa Tunari (BOL)
- 1st in Stage 4 Vuelta a Bolivia, Cochabamba (BOL)
- 2nd in Copa da Republica de Ciclismo (BRA)

2009 – Scott – Marcondes Cesar – Sao José dos Campos (SCO) Brazil

- 1st in Stage 5 Vuelta de San Juan, Angaco circuito (ARG)
- 6th in General Classification Giro del Sol San Juan (ARG)
- 1st in Stage 3 Volta Ciclistica Internacional de Gravatai, Gravataí (BRA)
- 1st in Stage 4 Volta Ciclistica Internacional de Gravatai, Gravataí (BRA)
- 1st in Stage 1 Volta Ciclistica Internacional de Santa Catarina, Timbó (BRA)
- 3rd in Prova Ciclistica 1° de Maio – GP Ayrton Senna (BRA)
- 5th in Gran Premio Ciudad de Buenos Aires (ARG)
- 4th in GP Campagnolo (b) (ARG)
- 1st in Prologue Vuelta a Bolivia 2009(BOL)
- 1st in Stage 1 Vuelta a Bolivia 2009(BOL)
- 1st in Stage 2 Vuelta a Bolivia 2009(BOL)

2010 – Funvic-Sundown-Feijão Tarumã-Pindamonhangaba (FUN) Brazil

- 4th Giro de Juan Koslay

2012 – Real Cycling Team

- 1st, Stage 2, Vuelta al Uruguay
- 1st, Stages 1 & 2, Tour do Rio
- 1st, Stage 4, Tour do Brasil
