= José Medina (cyclist) =

Chilean cyclist

Medal record

Representing Chile

Men's road cycling

Pan American Games
Bronze medal – third place	2003 Santo Domingo	Road Race

Pan American Championships
Gold medal – first place	2002 Quito	Time trial

José Alfredo Medina Andrade (born August 13, 1973) is a male track and road cyclist from Chile. He represented his native country at the 2000 Summer Olympics in Sydney, Australia. Medina won the elite time trial gold medal in the 2002 Pan American Championships held in Quito, Ecuador.
