= Marco Arriagada =

Chilean cyclist (born 1975)

Personal information
- Full name: Marco Antonio Arriagada Quinchel
- Born: October 30, 1975 (age 50) Curicó, Chile

Cycling career
- Sport: Cycling
- Discipline: Road
- Role: Rider
- Rider type: Climber

Amateur team
- 2010: Funvic–Pindamonhangaba
Medal record
Men's cycling
Representing Chile
Pan American Games
Gold medal – first place	2003 Sto Domingo	Men's team pursuit
Gold medal – first place	2007 Río de Janeiro	Men's team pursuit
Silver medal – second place	2003 Sto Domingo	Men's pursuit individual
Silver medal – second place	2003 Sto Domingo	Men's points race

Marco Antonio Arriagada Quinchel (born October 30, 1975, in Curicó) is a Chilean professional racing cyclist. He is the brother of cyclist Marcelo Arriagada. He carried the flag for his native country at the opening ceremony of the 2007 Pan American Games in Rio de Janeiro, Brazil. After a very successful opening to his 2011 season, which saw him take victories in Argentina, Chile and the Dominican Republic, Arriagada tested positive for the anabolic steroid stanozolol during the Vuelta de Chile. He later received a four-year ban.

== Career highlights ==
1999
5th in General Classification Vuelta Ciclista de Chile (CHI)
2001
Chile National Road Race Championships
4th in General Classification Vuelta Ciclista de Chile (CHI)
2002
(gold) in Pan American Championships, Track, Individual Pursuit, Quito (ECU):
1st in Stage 10 Vuelta Ciclista de Chile, Los Maitenes (CHI)
2003
1st in General Classification Vuelta Ciclista Lider al Sur (CHI)
Chile National Time Trial Championships, Elite, Chile (CHI)
2nd in National Championships, Road, Elite, Chile (CHI)
1st in Stage 7 Vuelta Ciclista de Chile, Farellones (CHI)
1st in General Classification Vuelta Ciclista de Chile (CHI)
(gold) in Pan American Games, Track, Team Pursuit, Santo Domingo (DOM)
(silver) in Pan American Games, Track, Individual Pursuit, Santo Domingo (DOM)
2004
1st in Moscou, Points race (RUS)
1st in Stage 2 part b Vuelta Ciclista Lider al Sur, Mafil (CHI)
1st in Stage 3 Vuelta Ciclista Lider al Sur, Villarrica (CHI)
Vuelta Ciclista de Chile:

Winner stage 9
Winner General Classification

3rd in Erondegem (BEL)
2005
1st in Stage 10 Vuelta Ciclista Lider al Sur, Maitén (CHI)
3rd in General Classification Vuelta Ciclista Lider al Sur (CHI)
Vuelta Ciclista de Chile:

1st in Stage 3, Farellones (CHI)
1st in Stage 6, Los Andes (CHI)
3rd in General Classification
1st in Mountains Classification

Pan American Championships, Mar del Plata (ARG):

(gold) in Track, Team Pursuit, Elite
(silver) in Track, Pursuit, Elite
(silver) in Track, Points Race, Elite

2006
1st in General Classification Termas Chillan (CHI)
1st in Stage 9 Vuelta a Mendoza (ARG)
1st in General Classification Vuelta a Mendoza (ARG)
1st in Stage 3 part b Vuelta Ciclista Lider al Sur, Mafil (CHI)
1st in Stage 9 Vuelta Ciclista Lider al Sur, Valle Nevado (CHI)
2nd in General Classification Vuelta Ciclista Lider al Sur (CHI)
Chile national Road Race Championship
1st in Stage 2 Vuelta Ciclista de Chile, Ovalle (CHI)
2007
1st in Stage 5 Vuelta a Peru, Reparticion (PER)
3rd in General Classification Vuelta a Peru (PER)
Chile national Road Race Championship
1st in Stage 2 part b Vuelta Ciclista Lider al Sur, Mafil (CHI)
1st in Mexico, Six Days, Aguascalientes (MEX)
1st in General Classification Vuelta de Atacama (CHI)
(gold) in Pan American Games (Team Pursuit), Rio de Janeiro (BRA)
2008
1st in Stage 5 Vuelta de San Juan, Cerro Colorado (ARG)
2010
1st Overall Volta do Parana

1st Stage 1
1st Stage 3

Chile National Time Trial Championships, Elite, Chile (CHI)
2011
1st Overall Tour de San Luis

== See also ==
- List of doping cases in cycling
