= Vuelta Ciclista de Chile =

Stage race in Chile

Vuelta de Chile
Race details
- Date: October
- Region: Chile
- English name: Tour of Chile
- Local name: Vuelta Ciclista de Chile
- Discipline: Road
- Competition: UCI America Tour 2.2
- Type: Stage race
- Organiser: Federación Ciclista de Chile
- Web site: www.fdnciclismochile.cl

History
- First edition: 1976
- Editions: 33 (as of 2025)
- First winner: Giovanni Fedrigo (ITA)
- Most wins: Luis Fernando Sepúlveda (CHI) (2); Marco Arriagada (CHI) (2)
- Most recent: Óscar Sevilla (ESP) (2019)

The Vuelta Ciclista de Chile (Tour of Chile) is the main professional men's road cycling stage race in Chile, first held in 1976.

The race is contested over multiple stages across different regions of Chile. It has been considered the country's premier cycling event, sometimes nicknamed the Multicolored Serpent for the colorful jerseys in the peloton.

== History ==
The inaugural edition was run between 23 October and 1 November 1976, under the name Vuelta Ciclística El Mercurio. It replaced the earlier Vuelta al Centro de la República (sponsored by the Arrigoni family since the 1950s). El Mercurio newspaper organized the 10-stage route from Puerto Montt to Santiago, with major crowds in Concepción and Santiago. Italian rider Giovanni Fedrigo became the first winner, while the San Bernardo club won the team classification.

From 1977, Colombian teams began to dominate the race, earning the nickname "Escarabajos" ("Beetles"). Antonio Londoño was champion in 1977, followed by several Colombian victories.

The race was not held in 1993, 1994, from 2007 to 2010, 2013 to 2016, 2018, and since 2020. In 2005, it was classified as a 2.2 race within the UCI America Tour. After a four-year pause, the event returned in January–February 2011. It was last held in 2017, when Colombian Nicolás Paredes took victory. Since then, the Vuelta has remained suspended, while other Chilean races such as the Vuelta Ciclista a Chiloé and the Gran Premio de la Patagonia gained prominence within the UCI America Tour.

== Past winners ==
Year	Country	Rider	Team
1976	Italy	Giovanni Fedrigo	{{{team}}}
1977	Colombia	Antonio Londoño	{{{team}}}
1978	Colombia	Norberto Cáceres	{{{team}}}
1979	Colombia	Alfonso Flórez Ortiz	{{{team}}}
1980	Colombia	Plinio Casas	{{{team}}}
1981	Belgium	Marc Somers	{{{team}}}
1982	Colombia	Julio Alberto Rubiano	{{{team}}}
1983	Chile	Roberto Muñoz	{{{team}}}
1984	Brazil	Renan Ferraro	{{{team}}}
1985	Uruguay	Federico Moreira	{{{team}}}
1986	Colombia	José Darío Hernández	{{{team}}}
1987	Chile	Peter Tormen	{{{team}}}
1988	Chile	Fernando Vera	{{{team}}}
1989	Colombia	Julio César Ortegón	{{{team}}}
1990	Soviet Union	Sergei Sukhoruchenkov	{{{team}}}
1991	Soviet Union	Pavel Tonkov	{{{team}}}
1992	Kazakhstan	Yuri Sourkov	{{{team}}}
1993–94	No race		
1995	Colombia	Ricardo Meza	{{{team}}}
1996	France	Christophe Moreau	{{{team}}}
1997	France	Patrice Halgand	{{{team}}}
1998	Spain	José Ramón Uriarte	{{{team}}}
1999	Chile	Luis Fernando Sepúlveda	{{{team}}}
2000	Chile	Luis Fernando Sepúlveda	{{{team}}}
2001	Spain	David Plaza	{{{team}}}
2002	Argentina	Gonzalo Salas	{{{team}}}
2003	Chile	Marco Arriagada	{{{team}}}
2004	Chile	Marco Arriagada	{{{team}}}
2005	Argentina	Edgardo Simón	{{{team}}}
2006	Russia	Andrei Sartassov	{{{team}}}
2007–10	No race		
2011	Chile	Gonzalo Garrido	{{{team}}}
2012	Chile	Patricio Almonacid	{{{team}}}
2013–16	No race		
2017	Colombia	Nicolás Paredes	{{{team}}}
2018	No race		
2019	Spain	Óscar Sevilla	{{{team}}}
2020–2025	No race		
