= Argentina at the 2003 Pan American Games =

- IOC code: ARG
- NOC: Comité Olímpico Argentino

in Santo Domingo 1–17 August 2003
- Flag bearer: José Meolans
- Medals Ranked 7th: Gold 16 Silver 20 Bronze 27 Total 63

Pan American Games appearances (overview)
- 1951; 1955; 1959; 1963; 1967; 1971; 1975; 1979; 1983; 1987; 1991; 1995; 1999; 2003; 2007; 2011; 2015; 2019; 2023

The 14th Pan American Games were held in Santo Domingo, Dominican Republic, from August 1 to August 17, 2003.

== Medals ==
=== Gold ===
===== Athletics =====
- Men's hammer throw: Juan Ignacio Cerra

===== Canoeing =====
- Men's K-1 500 m: Javier Correa
- Men's K-1 1,000 m: Javier Correa

===== Cycling =====
- Men's individual pursuit: Edgardo Simón
- Women's mountain bike: Jimena Florit
- Men's madison: Walter Pérez and Juan Curuchet

===== Football =====
- Men's tournament: Argentina national football team
  - Ezequiel Lázaro, Juan Pablo Carrizo, Marcos Aguirre, Jesús Méndez, Oscar Roberto Cornejo, Gustavo Eberto, Franco Sanchírico, Franco Cángele, Joel Barbosa, Hugo Colace, Alexis Cabrera, Alejandro Alonso, Marcos Galarza, Osmar Ferreyra, Pablo Barzola, Walter García, Raúl Gorostegui, Maximiliano López, Jonathan Bottinelli and Emanuel Perrone

===== Swimming =====
- Men's 100 m freestyle: José Meolans
- Women's 400 m individual medley: Georgina Bardach

=== Silver ===
===== Canoeing =====
- Men's K-2 500 m: Miguel Correa and Fernando Redondo
- Women's K-1 500 m: Fernanda Lauro

===== Cycling =====
- Men's team pursuit: Ángel Colla, Guillermo Brunetta, Walter Pérez and Edgardo Simón

===== Handball =====
- Men's tournament: Argentina
- Women's tournament: Argentina

===== Swimming =====
- Men's 100 m butterfly: José Meolans
- Women's 100 m freestyle: Florencia Szigeti

===== Taekwondo =====
- Women's –67 kg: Vanina Sánchez

===== Weightlifting =====
- Men's –94 kg: Darío Lecman
- Women's –75 kg: Nora Koppel

=== Bronze ===
===== Boxing =====
- Men's super heavyweight (+91 kg): Sébastian Ceballo

===== Canoeing =====
- Men's K-4 1,000 m: Damian Dossena, Rodrigo Caffa, Miguel Correa and Fernando Redondo
- Women's K-2 500 m: Sabrina Ameghino and María Romano
- Women's K-4 500 m: Vanesia Pittao, Mari Ducrett, Sabrina Ameghino and María Romano

===== Karate =====
- Men's kumite (+80 kg): Leandro Monzón

===== Taekwondo =====
- Men's –80 kg: Darío Coria
- Women's +67 kg: Patricia Riccautti

===== Triathlon =====
- Men's individual race: Oscar Galíndez

== Results by event ==
=== Athletics ===
Road

Athlete	Event	Time	Rank
Daniel Simbrón	Men's marathon	2:28:21	6

Field

Athlete	Event	Throws						Total	
Athlete	Event	1	2	3	4	5	6	Distance	Rank
Juan Ignacio Cerra	Men's hammer throw	73.24	69.54	72.42	73.85	X	75.53	75.53 m	1st place, gold medalist(s)
Adrián Marzo	Men's hammer throw	X	X	68.65	X	X	68.56	68.65 m	5
Jorge Balliengo	Men's discus throw	X	53.43	59.39	X	—	X	59.39 m	5
Marcelo Pugliese	Men's discus throw	55.39	55.13	X	55.88	55.18	X	55.88 m	8

Decathlon

Athlete	Decathlon										Total	
Athlete	100 m	Long jump	Shot put	High jump	400 m	110 m hurdles	Discus throw	Pole vault	Javelin throw	1500 m	Points	Rank
Santiago Lorenzo	11.31	6.89	13.57	1.83	49.94	15.18	40.98	4.70	58.68	4:42.37	7467	4
Enrique Aguirre	11.06	7.00	13.51	1.98	50.20	15.17	39.93	4.20	52.12	4:49.47	7356	5

- Alejandra García
- Javier Benitez
- Javier Carrique
- Solange Witteveen

=== Basketball ===
==== Men's tournament ====
- Preliminary round
  - Lost to United States (79-80)
  - Lost to Uruguay (81-84)
  - Defeated Puerto Rico (92–67)
- Classification matches
  - 5th/8th place: Defeated Canada (88–86)
  - 5th/6th place: Lost to Mexico (90–95) → 6th place
- Team roster
  - Bruno Lábaque
  - Diego Lo Grippo
  - Javier González Romana
  - Paolo Quinteros
  - Julio Mázzaro
  - Hernán Pelleteri
  - Patricio Pratto
  - Diego Alba
  - Martín Leiva
  - Diego Cavaco
  - Matías Sandes
  - Diego Guaita

==== Women's tournament ====
- Preliminary round
  - Defeated Dominican Republic (76-52)
  - Lost to Brazil (43-86)
  - Lost to Cuba (57-83)
  - Lost to United States (78-93)
  - Lost to Canada (57-62) → 5th place
- Team roster
  - Andrea Gale
  - Laura Nicolini
  - Erica Sanchez
  - Maria Fernández
  - Veronica Soberon
  - Paula Gatti
  - Macela Paoletta
  - Andrea Fernández
  - Vanesa Pires
  - Natalia Rios
  - Irene Cacciapuoti
  - Gisela Vega

=== Badminton ===
- Joaquin Berrios
- Santiago Castro
- Hugo Madsen

=== Bowling ===
- Ruben Favero
- Maria Lanzavechia
- Lucas Legnani
- Maria Quinteros

=== Boxing ===
Athlete	Event	Round of 16	Quarterfinals	Semifinals	Final
Athlete	Event	Opposition Result	Opposition Result	Opposition Result	Opposition Result
Juan Carlos Reveco	Light flyweight	Castañeda (MEX); L RSCO-3	did not advance		
Santiago Acosta	Flyweight	Valenzuela (GUA); W 13-7	Hilares (MEX); L 15-23	did not advance	
Juan Manuel Flores	Bantamweight	Mares (MEX); L 10-20	did not advance		
Daniel Brizuela	Featherweight	Bye	Aguilera (CUB); L 8-22	did not advance	
Matias Ferreyra	Lightweight	Mosquera (COL); W 20-19	Díaz (DOM); L 13-26	did not advance	
Lucas Matthysse	Light welterweight	Prescott (COL); L 5-17	did not advance		
Fabian Velardes	Welterweight	Bye	Aragón (CUB); L 4-23	did not advance	
Martín Islas	Middleweight	Periban (MEX); W 14-12	Despaigne (CUB); L RSCI-2	did not advance	
Julio Domínguez	Light heavyweight	Muñoz (VEN); L 9-14	did not advance		
Sebastian Ceballos	Super heavyweight	Bye	Zumbano (BRA); W 17-12	Estrada (USA); L 8-26 → (bronze)	did not advance

=== Canoeing ===
- Roman Turqui
- Javier Correa
- Damian Dossena
- Fernando Redondo
- Maria Fernanda Lauro
- Sabrina Ameghino
- Miguel Correa
- Juan Pablo Bergero
- Leonardo Niveiro
- Matias Machicote
- Liliana Pittao
- Rodrigo Caffa
- Maria Ducrett
- Maria Romano

=== Cycling ===
- Ángel Colla
- Edgardo Simón
- Walter Pérez
- Guillermo Brunetta
- Maximiliano Richeze
- Juan Curuchet
- Valeria Pintos
- Graciela Martínez

==== Mountain bike ====
- Carlos Gennero
  - Final — + 1 lap (→ 9th place)
- Jimena Florit
  - Final — 2:02.59 (→ 1st place)

=== Equestrian ===
- Gregorio Werthein
- Gabriel Armando
- Mariana Motta Pini
- Roxana Rubaldo
- Justo Albarracin
- Ricardo Kierkergaard
- Maria Andrea Guerreño

=== Fencing ===
- Alejandra Carbone
- Victor Groupierre
- Diego Drajer
- Lucas Saucedo
- Alberto Perez Ghersi
- Leandro Marchetti
- Juan Barbosa
- Santiago Induni
- Alberto González Viaggio

=== Football ===
==== Men's tournament ====
- Team roster
  - Ezequiel Lazaro
  - Juan Pablo Carrizo
  - Marcos Aguirre
  - Jesus Mendez
  - Oscar Roberto Cornejo
  - Gustavo Eberto
  - Franco Sanchirico
  - Franco Cángele
  - Joel Barbosa
  - Hugo Colace
  - Alexis Cabrera
  - Alejandro Alonso
  - Marcos Galarza
  - Osmar Ferreyra
  - Pablo Barsola
  - Walter García
  - Raúl Gorostegui
  - Maxi López
  - Jonathan Bottinelli
  - Emanuel Perrone

==== Women's tournament ====
- Team roster
  - Nancy Díaz
  - Karina Alvariza
  - Marisa Gerez
  - Yanina Gaitán
  - Noelia López
  - Andrea Gonsabate
  - Mariela Ricotti
  - Rosana Gomez
  - Marisol Medina
  - Romina Ferro
  - Mariela Coronel
  - Natalia Gatti
  - Vanina Correa
  - Valeria Cotelo
  - Clarisa Huber
  - Fabiana Vallejos
  - Analia Soledad Almeida
  - Eva González

=== Gymnastics ===
- Anahi Sosa
- Maria Antonella Yacobelli
- Ruth Vasta
- Melñina Sirolli
- Gabriela Parigi
- Lucas Chiarlo
- Martin Passalenti
- Federico Molinari
- Eric Pedersini
- Sergio Erbojo
- Mario Gorosito
- Celeste Carnevale
- Cecilia Stancato
- Maria Conde

=== Handball ===
==== Men's tournament ====
- Team roster
  - Lucas Guerra
  - Andrés Kogovsek
  - Eric Gull
  - Alejo Carrara
  - Cristian Canzoniero
  - Martin Viscovich
  - Alejandro Marine
  - Gonzalo Viscovich
  - Federico Besasso
  - Bruno Civelli
  - Gonzalo Carou
  - Rodolfo Carou
  - Rodolfo Jung
  - Sergio Crevatin
  - Fernando García
  - Cristian Plati

==== Women's tournament ====
- Team roster
  - Giselle Pintos
  - Sabrina Nievas
  - Florencia Am
  - Eliana Fontana
  - Karina Seif
  - Pamela Sampietro
  - Natacha Melillo
  - Valentina Kogan
  - Georgina Visciglia
  - Guadalupe Roman
  - Mariana Mansilla
  - Maria Decilio
  - Marianella Larroca
  - Maricel Bueno
  - Maria Barile

=== Field hockey ===
==== Men's tournament ====
- Team roster
  - Carlos Retegui
  - Pablo Moreira
  - Jorge Lombi
  - Mariano Chao
  - Mario Almada
  - Ezequiel Paulon
  - German Orozco
  - Fernando Zylberberg
  - Tomás MacCormik
  - Matias Vila
  - Fernando Oscaris
  - Lucas Cammareri
  - Marco Riccardi
  - Juan Esparis
  - Juan Pablo Hourquebie
  - Matías Paredes

==== Women's tournament ====
- Team roster
  - Maria Paz Ferrari
  - Magdalena Aicega
  - Alejandra Gulla
  - Mariela Antoniska
  - Mercedes Margalot
  - Ayelen Stepnik
  - Mariana Di Giacomo
  - Mariana González Oliva
  - Cecilia Rognoni
  - Maria de la Paz Hernández
  - Luciana Aymar
  - Natali Doreski
  - Claudia Burkart
  - Maria del Carril
  - Agustina García
  - Angela Cattaneo

=== Judo ===
- Miguel Albarracin
- Orlando Baccino
- Lorena Briceño
- Elizabeth Copes
- Daniela Krukower
- Jorge Lencina
- Andres Laforte
- Rodrigo Lucenti
- Melissa Rodríguez
- Diego Rosati
- Ariel Sganga

=== Karate ===
- Virginia Acevedo
- Lucio Martínez
- Leandro Monzon
- Silvina Perez
- Leonardo Santucho

=== Rowing ===
- Ulf Lienhard
- Federico Steindl
- Gustavo de Ezcurra
- Sebastian Massa
- Damian Ordás
- Ariel Suarez
- Sebastian Fernández
- Marcos Morales
- Walter Naneder
- Jose Czcy
- Fernando Loglen
- Santiago Fernández
- Siego Wehrendt

=== Sailing ===
- Miguel Saubidet
- Domingo Contesi
- Cristian Petersen
- Hernan Esteban Marino
- Marcos Galvan
- Juan Ignacio Grimaldi
- Matias Capizzano
- Diego Romero
- Luis Calabrese
- Jorge Engelhard
- Florencia Cerutti
- Catalina Walther

=== Shooting ===
- Melisa Gil
- Angel Velarte
- Pablo Alvarez
- Amelia Fournel
- Daniel Felizia
- Rafael Olivera Araus
- Hugo Rodulfo
- Masimino Modesti
- Ana Maria Gibaut
- Cyntia Kholer
- Manuel Britos
- Cecilia Zeid
- Ariel Romero
- Horacio Gil
- Juan Dasque

=== Softball ===
==== Men's tournament ====
- Team roster
  - Ricardo Biondi
  - Emiliano di Centa
  - Andres Gamarci
  - Julio Gamarci
  - Gustavo Guerrinieri
  - José Guerrinieri
  - Cristian Lacout
  - Guillrmo Correa
  - Pablo Montero
  - Gustavo Muñoz
  - Fernando Dagostino
  - José Luis Pintos
  - Pablo Pintos
  - Luis Rosales
  - Diego Salguero
  - Pablo Segui

=== Swimming ===
==== Men's competitions ====
Athlete	Event	Heat		Final	
Athlete	Event	Time	Rank	Time	Rank
José Meolans	50 m freestyle	22.68	4	22.42	2nd place, silver medalist(s)
José Meolans	100 m freestyle	50.05	2	49.27	1st place, gold medalist(s)

- Pablo Abal
- Cristian Soldano
- Georgina Bardach
- Florencia Szigeti
- Eduardo Otero
- Mariana Bertelotti

==== Women's competitions ====
Athlete	Event	Heat		Final	
Athlete	Event	Time	Rank	Time	Rank
Florencia Szigeti	50 m freestyle	26.61	6	26.39	6
Florencia Szigeti	100 m freestyle	56.73	4	55.92	2nd place, silver medalist(s)
Florencia Szigeti	200 m freestyle	2:04.21	5	2:03.23	6
Agustina de Giovanni	200 m breaststroke	2:35.72	5	2:33.92	5

=== Squash ===
- Jorge Keen
- Robertino Pezzota
- Rodrigo Pezzota

=== Table tennis ===
- Gaston Alto
- Kiu Song
- Martin Paradela
- Pablo Tabachnik

=== Taekwondo ===
- Dario Coria
- Carola Lopez Rodríguez
- Laura Lopez Rodríguez
- Patricia Ricciuti
- Vanina Beron

=== Tennis ===
- Carlos Berlocq
- Jorgelina Cravero
- Brian Dabul
- Natalia Garbellotto
- Vanina García Sokol
- Cristian Villagrán

=== Triathlon ===
Athlete	Event	Race			Total	
Athlete	Event	Swim	Bike	Run	Time	Rank
Oscar Galíndez	Men's individual	20:57.600	56:45.900	34:16.200	01:52:59	3rd place, bronze medalist(s)
Daniel Fontana	Men's individual	19:59.100	57:46.700	35:18.500	01:53:28	5
Ezequiel Morales	Men's individual	22:05.300	1:00:55.600	37:21.500	02:01:17	21
Nancy Álvarez	Women's individual	19:59.400	1:04:00.700	40:59.600	02:04:59	9
María Soledad Omar	Women's individual	22:00.800	1:06:55.800	44:59.800	02:13:56	14
Ana Paula Ortega	Women's individual	22:00.100	—	—	DNF	—

=== Water polo ===
==== Men's tournament ====
- Team roster
  - Hernan Mazzini
  - Mariano Zanotti
  - Federico Zuljan
  - Nicolas Bianchi
  - Juan Montane
  - Fernando Scursoni
  - Juan Felicce
  - Ramiro Gil
  - Tomas Bulgheroni
  - Silvio Corsi
  - Diego Giusto
  - Bruno Testa
  - Juan Manuel Albareda

=== Wrestling ===
- Javier Broschini
- Mauricio Cabello
- Lucas Garralda
- Romina Gonzalez
- Daniel Iglesias

== See also ==
- Argentina at the 2004 Summer Olympics
