= Football at the 2003 Pan American Games – Men's tournament =

Football – Men's tournament at the 2003 Pan American Games
- Venues: Estadio Olímpico Juan Pablo Duarte, Estadio Parque del Este and Estadio Panamericano, San Cristóbal
- Dates: 2–15 August

Medalists
Gold medal	Argentina
Silver medal	Brazil
Bronze medal	Mexico

The fourteenth edition of the football tournament at the Pan American Games was held in Santo Domingo, Dominican Republic from 2 August to 15 August 2003. A total of eight teams competed, with Mexico defending its title. The CONMEBOL teams played with their U-20 teams while teams from CONCACAF played with their U-23 squads.

Argentina won their 6th gold medal after beating Brazil in the final.

== Preliminary round ==
=== Group A ===
Pos	Team	Pld	W	D	L	GF	GA	GD	Pts
1	Argentina	3	3	0	0	7	4	+3	9
2	Mexico	3	1	1	1	7	6	+1	4
3	Paraguay	3	1	0	2	3	4	−1	3
4	Guatemala	3	0	1	2	2	5	−3	1

2 August

Mexico	1–1	Guatemala
Martínez 76' (pen.)		Thompson 46'

Estadio Parque del Este
Referee: William Mattus (Costa Rica)
2 August

Argentina	1–0	Paraguay
Cángele 65'

Estadio Parque del Este

5 August

Argentina	2–1	Guatemala
Cángele 49'; Alonso 73'		Mendoza 90' (pen.)

Estadio Parque del Este
Referee: Peter Prendergast (Jamaica)
5 August

Paraguay	1–3	Mexico
Dos Santos 9'		Partez 46', 52'; Rodríguez 67'

Estadio Parque del Este

8 August

Mexico	3–4	Argentina
Medina 42'; Pérez 78'; Martínez 83'		Galarza 50'; Bottinelli 75'; Cángele 80'; Ferreyra 84'

Estadio Parque del Este
Referee: Roberto Moreno (Panama)
8 August

Guatemala	0–2	Paraguay
		Florentín 39'; Dos Santos 90'

Estadio Panamericano, San Cristóbal
Referee: Ricardo Valenzuela (United States)

=== Group B ===
Pos	Team	Pld	W	D	L	GF	GA	GD	Pts
1	Brazil	3	3	0	0	11	1	+10	9
2	Colombia	3	2	0	1	5	5	0	6
3	Cuba	3	0	1	2	2	4	−2	1
4	Dominican Republic	3	0	1	2	2	10	−8	1

2 August

Dominican Republic	1–1	Cuba
Arias 3'		Morales 7'

Estadio Panamericano, San Cristóbal
3 August

Brazil	4–0	Colombia
Vágner Love 30', 41'; Gabriel Santos 34'; Coelho 65'

Estadio Parque del Este

6 August

Colombia	1–0	Cuba
Castrillón 43'

Estadio Parque del Este
6 August

Brazil	5–0	Dominican Republic
Dagoberto 5', 22'; Diego Souza 63'; Dudu 86'; Vágner Love 88'

Estadio Parque del Este

9 August

Brazil	2–1	Cuba
William 62'; Vágner Love 64'		Alcántara 50'

Estadio Parque del Este
9 August

Colombia	4–1	Dominican Republic
Perea 4', 43', 45', 48'		Cierra 63'

Estadio Panamericano, San Cristóbal

== Final round ==
Semi-finals
12 August – Santo Domingo
Argentina	2
Colombia	1
12 August – Santo Domingo
Brazil	1
Mexico	0

Final
15 August – Santo Domingo
Argentina	1
Brazil	0
Third place
15 August – Santo Domingo
Mexico	0 (5)
Colombia	0 (4)

=== Semi finals ===
12 August 2003

Argentina	2–1 (a.e.t.)	Colombia
Perrone 90'; Cángele 94'		Aguilar 70'

Estadio Olímpico Juan Pablo Duarte
Referee: Ricardo Valenzuela (United States)

12 August 2003

Brazil	1–0	Mexico
Dagoberto 87'

Estadio Olímpico Juan Pablo Duarte
Referee: Silviu Petrescu (Canada)

=== Bronze medal match ===
15 August 2003

Colombia	0–0 (a.e.t.)	Mexico
Penalties
	4–5

Estadio Olímpico Juan Pablo Duarte
Referee: Roberto Moreno (Panama)

=== Gold medal match ===
15 August 2003

Argentina	1–0	Brazil
López 45+1'	Report

Estadio Olímpico Juan Pablo Duarte
Referee: Peter Prendergast (Jamaica)

Argentina
Brazil

GK	1	Gustavo Eberto
RB	4	Joel Barbosa
CB	2	Walter García
CB	6	Jonathan Bottinelli
LB	13	Marcos Galarza
DM	5	Hugo Colace
RM	8	Alejandro Alonso	(substituted off) 69'
LM	15	Alexis Cabrera
AM	11	Osmar Ferreyra	(substituted off) 79'
CF	10	Franco Cángele
CF	9	Maxi López	(substituted off) 46'
Substitutes:
FW	20	Emanuel Perrone	(substituted on) 46'
DF	14	Pablo Barzola	(substituted on) 69'
MF	3	Raúl Gorostegui	(substituted on) 79'
Manager:
Miguel Tojo

GK	1	Fernando Henrique
RB	13	Dyego Coelho
CB	15	Irineu	(substituted off) 77'
CB	3	Gabriel Santos
LB	16	Wendel
RM	17	Vágner Love
CM	8	Dudu Cearense
LM	14	Leandro
AM	9	Cleiton Xavier
AM	18	Diego Souza
CF	10	William	(substituted off) 72'
Substitutes:
MF	5	Jardel	(substituted on) 72'
FW	7	Marcelo Nicácio	(substituted on) 77'
Manager:
Valinhos

2003 Pan American Games winners

Argentina
Sixth title

== Medalists ==
Event	Gold	Silver	Bronze
Men's football	Argentina: 1. Gustavo Eberto; 2. Walter García; 3. Raúl Gorostegui; 4. Joel Barbosa; 5. Hugo Colace; 6. Jonathan Bottinelli; 7. Marcos Aguirre; 8. Alejandro Alonso; 9. Maxi López; 10. Franco Cángele; 11. Osmar Ferreyra; 12. Nicolás Navarro; 13. Marcos Galarza; 14. Pablo Barzola; 15. Alexis Cabrera; 16. Jesús Méndez; 17. Franco Sanchirico; 18. Ezequiel Lázaro; 19. Roberto Cornejo; 20. Emanuel Perrone; Miguel Tojo (coach)	Brazil: 1. Fernando Henrique; 2. Simão; 3. Gabriel Santos; 4. Adaílton; 5. Jardel; 6. Moreno; 7. Marcelo Nicácio; 8. Dudu Cearense; 9. Cleiton Xavier; 10. William; 11. Dagoberto; 12. Jefferson; 13. Dyego Coelho; 14. Leandro; 15. Irineu; 16. Wendel; 17. Vágner Love; 18. Diego Souza; Valinhos (coach)	Mexico

== Goalscorers ==
4 goals

- (Argentina) Franco Cangele
- (Brazil) Vagner Love
- (Colombia) Edixon Perea
