= 2007 Vuelta a San Juan =

The 2007 Vuelta a San Juan was held from 11 to 21 January 2007 in Argentina. It was a multiple stage road cycling race that took part over a prologue and ten stages.

== Men's stage summary ==
Stage	Date	Start	Finish	Distance	Stage Top 3
P	11 January	San Juan	San Juan		(Argentina) Claudio Flores
1	12 January			162 km	(Argentina) Juan Capdevila (Argentina) Marcos Crespo (Argentina) Juan Pablo Dotti
2	13 January			150 km	(Argentina) Gerardo Fernandez (Argentina) Maximiliano Richeze (Argentina) Héctor Lucero
3	14 January			150 km	(Argentina) Ángel Colla (Argentina) Héctor Lucero (Argentina) Maximiliano Richeze
4	15 January			150 km	(Argentina) Maximiliano Richeze (Argentina) Hétor Lucero (Argentina) Gerardo Fernandez
5	16 January				(Argentina) Darío Díaz (Argentina) Maximiliano Richeze (Argentina) Ezequiel Romero
6	17 January			22 km	(Argentina) Darío Díaz (Argentina) Juan Pablo Dotti (Argentina) Juan Capdevila
7	18 January			139.7 km	(Argentina) Ricardo Escuela (Argentina) Luciano Montivero (Argentina) Ricardo Julio
8	19 January				(Venezuela) Luis Diaz (Argentina) Gerardo Fernandez (Argentina) Ricardo Escuela
9	20 January				(Argentina) Juan Pablo Dotti (Argentina) Sergio Montivero (Argentina) Luciano Montivero
10	21 January				(Argentina) Darío Díaz (Argentina) Héctor Lucerno (Argentina) Darío Ramírez

=== Men's top 10 overall ===
Pos	Rider	Time
1	(Argentina) Luciano Montivero	29:31.46
2	(Argentina) Darío Díaz	+ 0.09
3	(Argentina) Juan Pablo Dotti	+ 0.22
4	(Argentina) Gerardo Fernandez	+ 1.31
5	(Argentina) Sergio Montivero	+ 1.33
6	(Argentina) Ricardo Julio	+ 1.53
7	(Argentina) Pedro González	+ 2.01
8	(Argentina) Juan Capdevila	+ 2.35
9	(Argentina) Pedro Prieto	+ 3.28
10	(Argentina) Eduardo Vila	+ 4.04
