= Maximiliano Richeze =

Argentine road cyclist

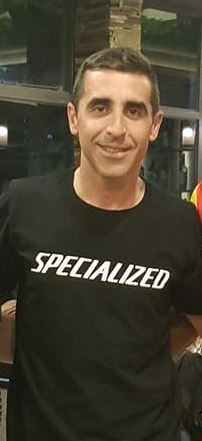
- Richeze at the 2023 Vuelta a San Juan

Personal information
- Full name: Ariel Maximiliano Richeze Araquistain
- Nickname: Atomico
- Born: 7 March 1983 (age 43) Bella Vista, Buenos Aires, Argentina
- Height: 1.77 m (5 ft 9 1/2 in)
- Weight: 68 kg (150 lb; 10 st 10 lb)

Cycling career
- Sport: Cycling
- Discipline: Road
- Role: Rider
- Rider type: Sprinter; Lead-out man

Professional teams
- 2006–2009: Ceramica Panaria–Navigare
- 2011–2012: D'Angelo & Antenucci–Nippo
- 2013–2015: Lampre–Merida
- 2016–2019: Etixx–Quick-Step
- 2020–2022: UAE Team Emirates

Major wins
- One-day races and Classics National Road Race Championships (2019)
Medal record
Representing Argentina
Men's road cycling
Pan American Games
Gold medal – first place	2019 Lima	Road race
Pan American Championships
Gold medal – first place	2012 Mar del Plata	Road race
Silver medal – second place	2018 San Juan	Road race
Men's track cycling
Pan American Games
Silver medal – second place	2015 Toronto	Team Pursuit

Ariel Maximiliano Richeze Araquistain (born 7 March 1983) is an Argentine professional cyclist, who competed as a professional from 2006 until January 2023. Richeze won the silver medal at the 2015 Pan American Games (Men's Team Pursuit). His brothers Roberto, Mauro and Adrián are also cyclists.

== Biography ==
Richeze was born in Bella Vista. In his first season as a professional racer, he obtained the second position in the last stage of the 2006 Giro d'Italia, finishing some centimetres behind Robert Förster. He is considered to be the Argentine cyclist to obtain the best result in any of the three main cycling tours (the Giro d'Italia, the Tour de France and the Vuelta a España), since naturalised Lucien Petit-Breton raced for France, Argentine-born Juan Antonio Flecha raced for Spain, and Alejandro Borrajo only achieved a third place, also at the Giro.

In the 2007 Giro d'Italia Richeze placed 3rd on Stage 3 and 2nd on Stage 18 and 21, all of which were won by Alessandro Petacchi. But after the disqualification of Petacchi in May 2008 for doping, Richeze was declared the winner of stages 18 and 21 of that Giro.

Among his other achievements are the first position of Stage 1 and other second positions in the 2006 Tour de Langkawi in Malaysia, and the 2005 Trofeo Arvedi of the Circuito del Porto in Portugal. Also in 2005 he won the Panamerican under-23 Championship, and in 2003 he became the Argentine under-23 champion.

In 2010 he was granted the Konex Award Merit Diploma as one of the five best cyclist of the last decade in Argentina.

In October 2015, after spending 11 seasons riding professionally for Italian teams, Belgian squad Etixx–Quick-Step announced that Richeze would join them from 2016 on a two-year contract, with a role as a lead-out man for Marcel Kittel and Fernando Gaviria. After four years without a victory he won the fourth stage at the 2016 Tour de Suisse and also won the points classification for his new team.

== Doping ==
Before the start of the 2008 Giro d'Italia Richeze tested positive for a steroid named stanozolol which resulted in his expulsion from the race. Despite being initially cleared by the Argentine Cycling Federation he was banned by the Court of Arbitration for Sport for two years.

== Major results ==
2003
1st Kilo, National Track Championships
2nd Overall Clásica del Oeste-Doble Bragado

1st Stage 6

2004
Vuelta Ciclista Lider al Sur

1st Stages 2a & 4a

1st Stage 2 Clásica del Oeste-Doble Bragado
2005
1st Road race, Pan American Under-23 Road Championships
1st Circuito del Porto
Clásica del Oeste-Doble Bragado

1st Stages 1 & 6b

1st Stage 2 Giro del Veneto
1st Stage 9 Vuelta a San Juan
2nd Road race, National Under-23 Road Championships
2nd Piccola Coppa Agostoni
7th Gran Premio della Liberazione
2006
1st Stage 1 Tour de Langkawi
2007
1st Stage 1 Tour de Luxembourg
1st Stage 2 Tour de Langkawi
1st Stage 4 Giro del Trentino
1st Stage 4 Vuelta a San Juan
4th Grand Prix de Rennes
5th Gran Premio Città di Misano – Adriatico
2008
1st Stage 2 Tour de San Luis
1st Stage 7 Tour of Turkey
3rd Trofeo Laigueglia
4th Giro di Toscana
6th Giro del Piemonte
7th Grand Prix de Rennes
9th Overall Circuit de la Sarthe

1st Stage 5

2011
Okolo Slovenska

1st Points classification
1st Stages 1, 6 & 7

4th Overall Tour de Kumano

1st Prologue

5th GP Kranj
6th Gran Premio della Costa Etruschi
2012
1st Road race, Pan American Road Championships
1st Overall Tour de Hokkaido

1st Points classification
1st Stages 2 & 3

Tour de Serbie

1st Points classification
1st Stages 1, 5 & 6

1st Stage 1 Tour of Japan
3rd Overall Tour de Korea
3rd Coppa Bernocchi
4th Overall Giro della Provincia di Reggio Calabria
5th Overall Tour de Kumano

1st Points classification
1st Stage 1

5th Gran Premio della Costa Etruschi
8th Overall Vuelta a Venezuela

1st Points classification
1st Stages 1, 7, 8 & 10

2013
Pan American Track Championships

1st Scratch
1st Team pursuit

1st Prologue Vuelta a San Juan
2015
2nd Team pursuit, Pan American Games
2016
Tour de Suisse

1st Points classification
1st Stage 4

1st Stage 1 (TTT) Tour de San Luis
2nd Eschborn-Frankfurt – Rund um den Finanzplatz
3rd Grand Prix Impanis-Van Petegem
2017
Vuelta a San Juan

1st Stages 6 & 7

5th Paris–Tours
6th EuroEyes Cyclassics
8th Eschborn–Frankfurt – Rund um den Finanzplatz
2018
1st Stage 1 Presidential Tour of Turkey
1st Stage 4 Vuelta a San Juan
2nd Road race, Pan American Road Championships
2019
1st Road race, Pan American Games
1st Road race, National Road Championships

=== Grand Tour general classification results timeline ===
Grand Tour	2006	2007	2008	2009	2010	2011	2012	2013	2014	2015	2016	2017	2018	2019	2020	2021	2022
Giro d'Italia	138	92	DNF	—	—	—	—	—	—	127	—	148	—	—	DNF	137	142
Tour de France	—	—	—	—	—	—	—	—	DNF	—	144	—	135	149	—	—	—
Vuelta a España	—	—	—	—	—	—	—	141	138	152	—	—	—	148	—	—	—

Legend
—	Did not compete
DNF	Did not finish

== See also ==
- List of doping cases in cycling
