= Juan Guillermo Brunetta =

Argentine cyclist (born 1975)

Personal information
- Full name: Juan Guillermo Brunetta
- Born: 25 August 1975 (age 51) Laboulaye, Argentina
- Height: 2.04 m (6 ft 8 in)
- Weight: 97 kg (214 lb)

Cycling career
- Sport: Cycling
- Disciplines: Road, track
- Role: Rider
- Rider type: Time-trialist
Medal record
Men's road bicycle racing
Representing Argentina
Pan American Games
Silver medal – second place	2003 Santo Domingo	Team pursuit
Bronze medal – third place	1999 Winnipeg	Team pursuit
Pan American Championships
Bronze medal – third place	2005 Mar del Plata	Time trial

Juan Guillermo Brunetta (born August 25, 1975, in Laboulaye, Córdoba) is an Argentine professional racing cyclist. He is most famous for his unusual size for a cyclist. He is 2.04 metres (6 ft 8 in) and 97 kilograms (214 lb). Like most cyclists out of Córdoba, he started off as a track rider but has made the transition to the road and does not race as much on the track these days. He has been one of the best time trialists for the last 6 years in Argentina, but he has raced most of his road career in Uruguay with the Villa Teresa team with much success, especially in the time trials. He competed in the men's team pursuit at the 2000 Summer Olympics. Since 2007 he has been racing in Argentina again.

== Career highlights ==
2000
1st, Stage 5, Vuelta a la Argentina
2001
Argentina National Championships, Road Race
2nd Pan American Championships, Track, Individual Pursuit, Medellín, Colombia
2002
Argentina National Championships, Individual Time Trial
2nd, Overall, Vuelta a San Juan
1st, Stage 8B, Vuelta Ciclista de Chile
1st, Stage 6A, Clásica del Oeste-Doble Bragado
2003
Argentina National Championships, Track, Individual Pursuit
Argentina National Championships, Individual Time Trial
(silver) in Pan American Games, Track, Team Pursuit, Santo Domingo (DOM)
2004
Argentina National Championships, Individual Time Trial
Argentina National Championships, Track, Individual Pursuit
1st, Stage 4, Vuelta de San Juan
1st, Overall, Giro del Sol

1st, Stage 2

2005
3rd Pan American Championships, Individual Time trial in Mar del Plata, Argentina
Argentina National Championship, Individual Time trial
Argentina National Championship, Track, Madison with Jorge Ruschansky
Argentina National Championship, Track, Individual Pursuit
2006
1st, Stage 1 & 9, Rutas de America
3rd, Overall, Vuelta Ciclista del Uruguay

1st, Stage 8

2007
Argentina National Championship, Individual Time trial
2nd National Championship, Track, Individual Pursuit
Argentina National Championship, Track, Team Pursuit with the Cordoba Track Team
Argentina National Championship, Track, Madison with Sebastian Cancio
1st, Stage 8B, Rutas de America
2008
1st, Stage 8, Vuelta a San Juan
2nd, Stage 3, Tour de San Luis
2nd, Overall, Clásica del Oeste-Doble Bragado

1st, Stage 6A
