= 2008 Tour de San Luis =

Race details
- Dates: January 22 – January 27
- Stages: 5
- Distance: 622 km (386 mi)
- Winning time: 15h 31' 21"

Results
	Winner	Martín Garrido (ARG)
	Second	Gerardo Fernández (ARG)
	Third	Jorge Giacinti (ARG)

The 2008 Tour de San Luis was a men's road cycling race held from 22 to January 27, 2008 in Argentina. The second edition of this road racing event was a multiple stage race with a prologue, five stages and a total length of 622 kilometres.

== Stage summary ==
Stage	Date	Start	Finish	Distance	Stage Top 3
P	22 January	San Luis	San Luis	3.5 km	(Argentina) Martín Garrido (Argentina) Fernando Antogna (Argentina) Alejandro Borrajo
1	23 January	San Luis	Villa Mercedes	168.4 km	(Argentina) Juan José Haedo (Argentina) Maximiliano Richeze (Cuba) Gil Cordovés
2	24 January	La Toma	Merlo	168.7 km	(Argentina) Maximiliano Richeze (Argentina) Martín Garrido (Argentina) Alejandro Alberto Borrajo
3	25 January	San Luis	San Luis	19.8 km	(Argentina) Martín Garrido (Argentina) Juan Guillermo Brunetta (Argentina) Matías Médici
4	26 January	San Luis	Mirador El Potrero	157.1 km	(Venezuela) Carlos José Ochoa (Spain) Beñat Intxausti (Colombia) José Serpa
5	27 January	San Luis	San Luis	144.5 km	(Argentina) Juan José Haedo (Argentina) Maximiliano Richeze (Cuba) Gil Cordoves

== General Classification ==
Pos	Rider	Time
1	(Argentina) Martín Garrido	15:31.21
2	(Argentina) Gerardo Fernández	+ 1.06
3	(Argentina) Jorge Giacinti	+ 1.09
4	(Colombia) José Serpa	+ 1.10
5	(Brazil) Magno Nazaret	+ 1.11
6	(Argentina) Gaston Aguero	+ 1.22
7	(Italy) Manuele Boaro	+ 1.23
8	(Argentina) Gabriel Brizuela	+ 1.28
9	(Spain) David Blanco	+ 1.46
10	(Venezuela) Carlos José Ochoa	+ 1.51
