= 2007 Tour de San Luis =

2008 Tour de San Luis
Race details
- Dates: January 23 – January 28
- Stages: 5
- Distance: 625 km (388.4 mi)
- Winning time: 14h 40' 14"

Results
	Winner	Jorge Giacinti (ARG)
	Second	Fernando Antogna (ARG)
	Third	Francisco Mancebo (ESP)

The 2007 Tour de San Luis was a men's road cycling race held from 23 to 28 January 2007 in Argentina. It was a multiple stage race over a prologue and five stages with a total of 625 kilometres.

== Stage summary ==
Stage	Date	Start	Finish	Distance	Stage Top 3
P	23 January	San Luis	San Luis	4 km	(Argentina) Fernando Antogna (Argentina) Matías Médici (Argentina) Martín Garrido
1	24 January	San Luis	Villa Mercedes	165 km	(Argentina) Ángel Colla (Italy) Fabio Masotti (Argentina) Martín Garrido
2	25 January	San Luis	Quines	165 km	(Argentina) Fernando Antogna (Argentina) Armando Ariel Borrajo (Argentina) Diego Simeani
3	26 January	San Luis	Mirador	11 km	(Argentina) Jorge Giacinti (Argentina) Gabriel Brizuela (Argentina) Matías Médici
4	27 January	La Toma	Merlo	160 km	(Italy) Ricardo Riccò (Mexico) Juan Pablo Magallanes (Argentina) Martín Garrido
5	28 January	San Luis	San Luis	120 km	(Spain) Daniel Moreno (Argentina) Fausto Esparza (Argentina) Diego Simeani

== General Classification ==
Pos	Rider	Time
1	(Argentina) Jorge Giacinti	14:40.14
2	(Argentina) Fernando Antogna	+ 0.37
3	(Spain) Francisco Mancebo	+ 0.55
4	(Argentina) Gabriel Brizuela	+ 1.08
5	(Russia) Krasimir Vasilev	+ 1.12
6	(Argentina) Matías Médici	+ 1.25
7	(Italy) Federico Pagani	+ 1.36
8	(Argentina) Diego Simeani	+ 2.10
9	(Italy) Ricardo Ricco	+ 2.11
10	(Italy) Giario Ermeti	+ 2.13
