= 2016 Tour de Suisse =

2016 UCI World Tour, race 17 of 28
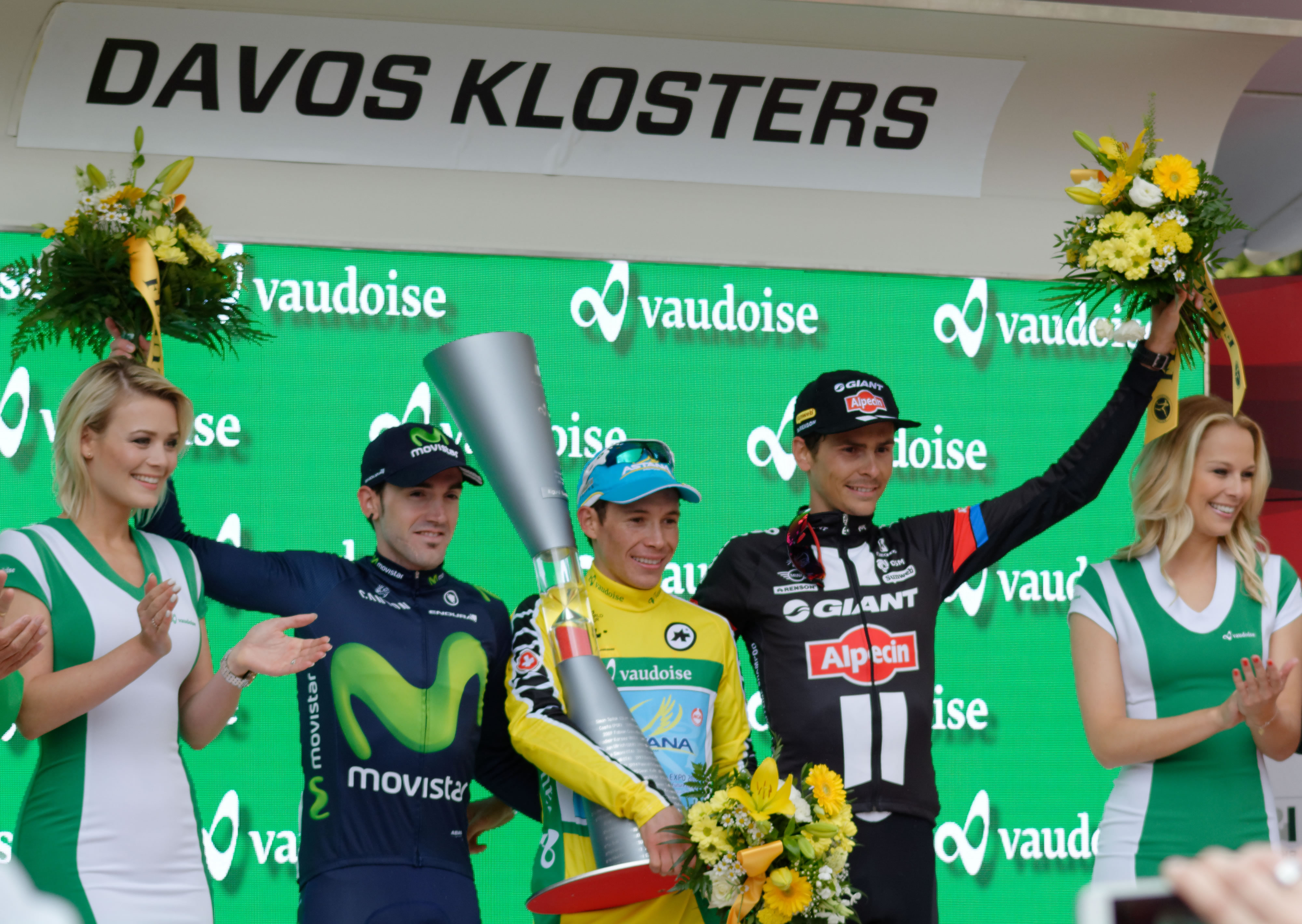
- Podium of 2016 Tour de Suisse

Race details
- Dates: 11–19 June 2016
- Stages: 9
- Distance: 1,257.9 km (781.6 mi)
- Winning time: 30h 55' 58"

Results
Jersey awarded to the overall winner	Winner	Miguel Ángel López (COL)	(Astana)
	Second	Ion Izagirre (ESP)	(Movistar Team)
	Third	Warren Barguil (FRA)	(Team Giant–Alpecin)
Jersey awarded to the points classification winner	Points	Maximiliano Richeze (ARG)	(Etixx–Quick-Step)
Jersey awarded to the mountains classification winner	Mountains	Antwan Tolhoek (NED)	(Roompot–Oranje Peloton)
	Team	Team Katusha	

The 2016 Tour de Suisse was the 80th edition of the Tour de Suisse cycling stage race. It took place from 11 to 19 June as the nineteenth event of the 2016 UCI World Tour. It was won by Colombian cyclist Miguel Ángel López.

== Schedule ==
Stage characteristics and winners
Stage	Date	Route	Distance	Type	Winner
1	11 June	Baar to Baar	6.4 km (4.0 mi)	Individual time trial	Fabian Cancellara (SUI)
2	12 June	Baar to Baar	187.6 km (116.6 mi)	Medium-mountain stage	Peter Sagan (SVK)
3	13 June	Grosswangen to Rheinfelden	192.6 km (119.7 mi)	Flat stage	Peter Sagan (SVK)
4	14 June	Rheinfelden to Champagne	193 km (119.9 mi)	Flat stage	Maximiliano Richeze (ARG)
5	15 June	Brig-Glis to Carì	126.4 km (78.5 mi)	Mountain stage	Darwin Atapuma (COL)
6	16 June	Weesen to Amden	162.8 km (101.2 mi)	Mountain stage	Pieter Weening (NED)
7	17 June	Arbon to Sölden (Austria)	224.3 km (139.4 mi)	Mountain stage	Tejay van Garderen (USA)
8	18 June	Davos to Davos	16.8 km (10.4 mi)	Individual time trial	Ion Izagirre (ESP)
9	19 June	Davos to Davos	117.7 km (73.1 mi)	Mountain stage	Jarlinson Pantano (COL)
	Total		1,257.9 km (782 mi)		

== Participating teams ==
As the Tour de Suisse is a UCI World Tour event, all eighteen UCI Pro Teams were invited automatically and obliged to enter a team into the race. Four teams were also given wildcard places in the race.

UCI WorldTeams

- AG2R La Mondiale
- Astana
- BMC Racing Team
- Etixx–Quick-Step
- FDJ
- IAM Cycling
- Lampre–Merida
- Lotto–Soudal
- Movistar Team
- Team Giant–Alpecin
- Team Katusha
- LottoNL–Jumbo
- Team Dimension Data
- Team Sky
- Tinkoff
- Trek–Segafredo
- Orica–GreenEDGE
- Cannondale

UCI Professional Continental teams

- CCC–Sprandi–Polkowice
- Roompot–Oranje Peloton
- Team Roth
- Verva ActiveJet

== Stages ==
=== Stage 1 ===
11 June 2016 – Baar, 6.4 km (4.0 mi) Individual time trial (ITT)

Stage 1 Result and General Classification
Rank	Rider	Team	Time
1	Fabian Cancellara (SUI)	Trek–Segafredo	7' 38"
2	Jürgen Roelandts (BEL)	Lotto–Soudal	+ 1"
3	Luke Durbridge (AUS)	Orica–GreenEDGE	+ 2"
4	Martin Elmiger (SUI)	IAM Cycling	+ 6"
5	Ion Izagirre (ESP)	Movistar Team	+ 6"
6	Tim Wellens (BEL)	Lotto–Soudal	+ 7"
7	Johan Le Bon (FRA)	FDJ	+ 9"
8	Silvan Dillier (SUI)	BMC Racing Team	+ 9"
9	Gorka Izagirre (ESP)	Movistar Team	+ 10"
10	Wilco Kelderman (NED)	LottoNL–Jumbo	+ 10"
Source: Cyclingnews.com

=== Stage 2 ===
12 June 2016 – Baar to Baar, 187.6 km (116.6 mi)

Stage 2 Results
Rank	Rider	Team	Time
1	Peter Sagan (SVK)	Tinkoff	4h 35' 19"
2	Maximiliano Richeze (ARG)	Etixx–Quick-Step	s.t.
3	Michael Matthews (AUS)	Orica–GreenEDGE	s.t.
4	Magnus Cort (DEN)	Orica–GreenEDGE	s.t.
5	Jürgen Roelandts (BEL)	Lotto–Soudal	s.t.
6	Jasper Stuyven (BEL)	Trek–Segafredo	s.t.
7	Danny van Poppel (NED)	Team Sky	+ 3"
8	Reinardt Janse van Rensburg (RSA)	Team Dimension Data	+ 3"
9	Sven Erik Bystrom (NOR)	Team Katusha	+ 3"
10	Tom Van Asbroeck (BEL)	LottoNL–Jumbo	+ 3"
Source: Cyclingnews.com

General Classification after Stage 2
Rank	Rider	Team	Time
1	Jürgen Roelandts (BEL)	Lotto–Soudal	4h 42' 56"
2	Fabian Cancellara (SUI)	Trek–Segafredo	+ 1"
3	Luke Durbridge (AUS)	Orica–GreenEDGE	+ 6"
4	Peter Sagan (SVK)	Tinkoff	+ 10"
5	Martin Elmiger (SUI)	IAM Cycling	+ 10"
6	Ion Izagirre (ESP)	Movistar Team	+ 10"
7	Tim Wellens (BEL)	Lotto–Soudal	+ 11"
8	Johan Le Bon (FRA)	FDJ	+ 13"
9	Silvan Dillier (SUI)	BMC Racing Team	+ 13"
10	Gorka Izagirre (ESP)	Movistar Team	+ 14"
Source: Cyclingnews.com

=== Stage 3 ===
13 June 2016 – Grosswangen to Rheinfelden, 192.6 km (119.7 mi)

Stage 3 Results
Rank	Rider	Team	Time
1	Peter Sagan (SVK)	Tinkoff	4h 31' 17"
2	Michael Albasini (SUI)	Orica–GreenEDGE	s.t.
3	Silvan Dillier (SUI)	BMC Racing Team	s.t.
4	Maximiliano Richeze (ARG)	Etixx–Quick-Step	+ 3"
5	Jürgen Roelandts (BEL)	Lotto–Soudal	+ 3"
6	Jhonatan Restrepo (COL)	Team Katusha	+ 3"
7	Michael Matthews (AUS)	Orica–GreenEDGE	+ 3"
8	Rui Costa (POR)	Lampre–Merida	+ 3"
9	Simon Geschke (GER)	Team Giant–Alpecin	+ 3"
10	Christopher Juul Jensen (DEN)	Orica–GreenEDGE	+ 3"
Source: Cyclingnews.com

General Classification after Stage 3
Rank	Rider	Team	Time
1	Peter Sagan (SVK)	Tinkoff	9h 14' 13"
2	Jürgen Roelandts (BEL)	Lotto–Soudal	+ 3"
3	Silvan Dillier (SUI)	BMC Racing Team	+ 3"
4	Ion Izagirre (ESP)	Movistar Team	+ 13"
5	Tim Wellens (BEL)	Lotto–Soudal	+ 14"
6	Gorka Izagirre (ESP)	Movistar Team	+ 17"
7	Wilco Kelderman (NED)	LottoNL–Jumbo	+ 17"
8	Michael Matthews (AUS)	Orica–GreenEDGE	+ 18"
9	Geraint Thomas (GBR)	Team Sky	+ 19"
10	Simon Geschke (GER)	Team Giant–Alpecin	+ 20"
Source: Cyclingnews.com

=== Stage 4 ===
14 June 2016 – Rheinfelden to Champagne, 193 km (120 mi)

Stage 4 Results
Rank	Rider	Team	Time
1	Maximiliano Richeze (ARG)	Etixx–Quick-Step	5h 08' 21"
2	Fernando Gaviria (COL)	Etixx–Quick-Step	s.t.
3	Peter Sagan (SVK)	Tinkoff	s.t.
4	Tom Van Asbroeck (BEL)	LottoNL–Jumbo	+ 2"
5	Jasper Stuyven (BEL)	Trek–Segafredo	+ 2"
6	Magnus Cort (DEN)	Orica–GreenEDGE	+ 2"
7	Raymond Kreder (NED)	Roompot–Oranje Peloton	+ 2"
8	Andrea Pasqualon (ITA)	Team Roth	+ 2"
9	Jürgen Roelandts (BEL)	Lotto–Soudal	+ 2"
10	Warren Barguil (FRA)	Team Giant–Alpecin	+ 2"
Source: Cyclingnews.com

General Classification after Stage 4
Rank	Rider	Team	Time
1	Peter Sagan (SVK)	Tinkoff	14h 22' 30"
2	Jürgen Roelandts (BEL)	Lotto–Soudal	+ 9"
3	Silvan Dillier (SUI)	BMC Racing Team	+ 9"
4	Maximiliano Richeze (ARG)	Etixx–Quick-Step	+ 17"
5	Ion Izagirre (ESP)	Movistar Team	+ 19"
6	Tim Wellens (BEL)	Lotto–Soudal	+ 20"
7	Gorka Izagirre (ESP)	Movistar Team	+ 23"
8	Wilco Kelderman (NED)	LottoNL–Jumbo	+ 23"
9	Michael Matthews (AUS)	Orica–GreenEDGE	+ 24"
10	Geraint Thomas (GBR)	Team Sky	+ 25"
Source: Cyclingnews.com

=== Stage 5 ===
15 June 2016 – Brig-Glis to Cari, 126.4 km (78.5 mi)

Stage 5 Results
Rank	Rider	Team	Time
1	Darwin Atapuma (COL)	BMC Racing Team	3h 41' 52"
2	Warren Barguil (FRA)	Team Giant–Alpecin	+ 4"
3	Pierre Latour (FRA)	AG2R La Mondiale	+ 7"
4	Tejay van Garderen (USA)	BMC Racing Team	+ 9"
5	Wilco Kelderman (NED)	LottoNL–Jumbo	+ 9"
6	Geraint Thomas (GBR)	Team Sky	+ 12"
7	Andrew Talansky (USA)	Cannondale	+ 12"
8	Rui Costa (POR)	Lampre–Merida	+ 16"
9	Michele Scarponi (ITA)	Astana	+ 16"
10	Miguel Ángel López (COL)	Astana	+ 16"
Source: Cyclingnews.com

General Classification after Stage 5
Rank	Rider	Team	Time
1	Pierre Latour (FRA)	AG2R La Mondiale	18h 04' 54"
2	Wilco Kelderman (NED)	LottoNL–Jumbo	+ 0"
3	Geraint Thomas (GBR)	Team Sky	+ 5"
4	Warren Barguil (FRA)	Team Giant–Alpecin	+ 16"
5	Tejay van Garderen (USA)	BMC Racing Team	+ 18"
6	Andrew Talansky (USA)	Cannondale	+ 19"
7	Gorka Izagirre (ESP)	Movistar Team	+ 27"
8	Ion Izagirre (ESP)	Movistar Team	+ 30"
9	Miguel Ángel López (COL)	Astana	+ 34"
10	Jarlinson Pantano (COL)	IAM Cycling	+ 34"
Source: Cyclingnews.com

=== Stage 6 ===
16 June 2016 – Weesen to Amden, 162.8 km (101.2 mi)

Stage 6 Results
Rank	Rider	Team	Time
1	Pieter Weening (NED)	Roompot–Oranje Peloton	4h 33' 47"
2	Maximiliano Richeze (ARG)	Etixx–Quick-Step	+ 2' 37"
3	Maciej Paterski (POL)	CCC–Sprandi–Polkowice	+ 3' 57"
4	Kristjan Koren (SLO)	Cannondale	+ 4' 13"
5	Wilco Kelderman (NED)	LottoNL–Jumbo	+ 4' 31"
6	Andrew Talansky (USA)	Cannondale	+ 4' 31"
7	Warren Barguil (FRA)	Team Giant–Alpecin	+ 4' 31"
8	Ion Izagirre (ESP)	Movistar Team	+ 4' 35"
9	Miguel Ángel López (COL)	Astana	+ 4' 36"
10	Simon Špilak (SLO)	Team Katusha	+ 4' 39"
Source: Cyclingnews.com

General Classification after Stage 6
Rank	Rider	Team	Time
1	Wilco Kelderman (NED)	LottoNL–Jumbo	22h 43' 12"
2	Warren Barguil (FRA)	Team Giant–Alpecin	+ 16"
3	Andrew Talansky (USA)	Cannondale	+ 19"
4	Ion Izagirre (ESP)	Movistar Team	+ 34"
5	Miguel Ángel López (COL)	Astana	+ 39"
6	Pierre Latour (FRA)	AG2R La Mondiale	+ 51"
7	Simon Špilak (SLO)	Team Katusha	+ 52"
8	Geraint Thomas (GBR)	Team Sky	+ 56"
9	Gorka Izagirre (ESP)	Movistar Team	+ 59"
10	Jarlinson Pantano (COL)	IAM Cycling	+ 1' 03"
Source: Cyclingnews.com

=== Stage 7 ===
17 June 2016 – Arbon to Sölden (Austria), 224.3 km (139.4 mi)

Stage 7 Results
Rank	Rider	Team	Time
1	Tejay van Garderen (USA)	BMC Racing Team	6h 26' 13"
2	Miguel Ángel López (COL)	Astana	+ 16"
3	Warren Barguil (FRA)	Team Giant–Alpecin	+ 16"
4	Jarlinson Pantano (COL)	IAM Cycling	+ 31"
5	Andrew Talansky (USA)	Cannondale	+ 33"
6	Simon Špilak (SLO)	Team Katusha	+ 43"
7	Rui Costa (POR)	Lampre–Merida	+ 49"
8	Ion Izagirre (ESP)	Movistar Team	+ 49"
9	Víctor de la Parte (ESP)	CCC–Sprandi–Polkowice	+ 59"
10	Jan Hirt (CZE)	CCC–Sprandi–Polkowice	+ 59"
Source: Cyclingnews.com

General Classification after Stage 7
Rank	Rider	Team	Time
1	Warren Barguil (FRA)	Team Giant–Alpecin	29h 09' 53"
2	Miguel Ángel López (COL)	Astana	+ 21"
3	Andrew Talansky (USA)	Cannondale	+ 24"
4	Ion Izagirre (ESP)	Movistar Team	+ 55"
5	Jarlinson Pantano (COL)	IAM Cycling	+ 1' 06"
6	Simon Špilak (SLO)	Team Katusha	+ 1' 07"
7	Tejay van Garderen (USA)	BMC Racing Team	+ 1' 31"
8	Geraint Thomas (GBR)	Team Sky	+ 1' 36"
9	Wilco Kelderman (NED)	LottoNL–Jumbo	+ 1' 39"
10	Rui Costa (POR)	Lampre–Merida	+ 1' 55"
Source: Cyclingnews.com

=== Stage 8 ===
18 June 2016 – Davos, 16.8 km (10.4 mi) Individual time trial

Stage 8 Results
Rank	Rider	Team	Time
1	Ion Izagirre (ESP)	Movistar Team	21' 31"
2	Miguel Ángel López (COL)	Astana	+ 18"
3	Fabian Cancellara (SUI)	Trek–Segafredo	+ 19"
4	Wilco Kelderman (NED)	LottoNL–Jumbo	+ 21"
5	Andrew Talansky (USA)	Cannondale	+ 23"
6	Jonathan Castroviejo (ESP)	Movistar Team	+ 24"
7	Jarlinson Pantano (COL)	IAM Cycling	+ 25"
8	Michael Matthews (AUS)	Orica–GreenEDGE	+ 25"
9	Geraint Thomas (GBR)	Team Sky	+ 33"
10	Tejay van Garderen (USA)	BMC Racing Team	+ 34"
Source: Cyclingnews.com

General Classification after Stage 8
Rank	Rider	Team	Time
1	Miguel Ángel López (COL)	Astana	29h 32' 03"
2	Andrew Talansky (USA)	Cannondale	+ 8"
3	Ion Izagirre (ESP)	Movistar Team	+ 16"
4	Warren Barguil (FRA)	Team Giant–Alpecin	+ 18"
5	Jarlinson Pantano (COL)	IAM Cycling	+ 52"
6	Wilco Kelderman (NED)	LottoNL–Jumbo	+ 1' 21"
7	Tejay van Garderen (USA)	BMC Racing Team	+ 1' 26"
8	Geraint Thomas (GBR)	Team Sky	+ 1' 30"
9	Simon Špilak (SLO)	Team Katusha	+ 1' 31"
10	Rui Costa (POR)	Lampre–Merida	+ 2' 09"
Source: Cyclingnews.com

=== Stage 9 ===
19 June 2016 – La Punt to Davos, 57 km (35 mi)

Stage 9 Results
Rank	Rider	Team	Time
1	Jarlinson Pantano (COL)	IAM Cycling	1h 23" 55"
2	Sergey Chernetskiy (RUS)	Team Katusha	s.t.
3	Ion Izagirre (ESP)	Movistar Team	s.t.
4	Miguel Ángel López (COL)	Astana	s.t.
5	Tejay van Garderen (USA)	BMC Racing Team	s.t.
6	Rui Costa (POR)	Lampre–Merida	s.t.
7	Warren Barguil (FRA)	Team Giant–Alpecin	s.t.
8	Andrew Talansky (USA)	Cannondale	+ 56"
9	Víctor de la Parte (ESP)	CCC–Sprandi–Polkowice	+ 56"
10	Joe Dombrowski (USA)	Cannondale	+ 56"
Source: Cyclingnews.com

Final General Classification
Rank	Rider	Team	Time
1	Miguel Ángel López (COL)	Astana	30h 55' 58"
2	Ion Izagirre (ESP)	Movistar Team	+ 12"
3	Warren Barguil (FRA)	Team Giant–Alpecin	+ 18"
4	Jarlinson Pantano (COL)	IAM Cycling	+ 42"
5	Andrew Talansky (USA)	Cannondale	+ 1' 04"
6	Tejay van Garderen (USA)	BMC Racing Team	+ 1' 26"
7	Rui Costa (POR)	Lampre–Merida	+ 2' 09"
8	Wilco Kelderman (NED)	LottoNL–Jumbo	+ 2' 38"
9	Simon Špilak (SLO)	Team Katusha	+ 2' 48"
10	Sergey Chernetskiy (RUS)	Team Katusha	+ 5' 08"
Source: Cyclingnews.com

== Classification leadership ==
In the Tour de Suisse, three different jerseys were awarded. For the general classification, calculated by adding each cyclist's finishing times on each stage, and the leader received a yellow jersey. This classification was considered the most important of the Tour de Suisse, and the winner of the classification was considered the winner of the race. There was also a mountains classification, the leadership of which was marked by a light blue jersey. In the mountains classification, points were won by reaching the top of a climb before other cyclists, with more points available for the higher-categorised climbs. Hors Category gave 20 points to the first rider crossing (20, 15, 10, 6, 4), a Category 1 was worth 12 points (12, 8, 6, 4, 2), a Category 2 was worth 8 points (8, 6, 4, 2, 1) and a Category 3 was worth 5 points (5, 3, 2, 1).

The third jersey represented the points classification, marked by a black jersey. In the points classification, cyclists got points for finishing highly in a stage. A stage victory awarded 10 points, with 8 points for second, 6 for third, 4 for fourth and 2 for fifth. Points could also be earned at intermediate sprints location for finishing in the top three during each stage on a 6–3–1 scale. There was also a classification for teams, in which the times of the best three cyclists per team on each stage were added together; the leading team at the end of the race was the team with the lowest total time.

A combativity award was also attributed for the rider who had ridden the most aggressively in the eyes of the judges at the end of every stage. It could have been a rider who featured in breakaways or a cyclist who attacked often.

Classification leadership by stage
Stage	Winner	General classification	Mountains classification	Points classification	Best Swiss rider classification	Team classification	Combativity award
1	Fabian Cancellara	Fabian Cancellara	not awarded	Fabian Cancellara	Fabian Cancellara	Lotto–Soudal	not awarded
2	Peter Sagan	Jürgen Roelandts	Matthias Krizek	Fabian Cancellara	Fabian Cancellara	Lotto–Soudal	Marcel Wyss
3	Peter Sagan	Peter Sagan	Antwan Tolhoek	Peter Sagan	Silvan Dillier	Lotto–Soudal	Silvan Dillier
4	Maximiliano Richeze	Peter Sagan	Antwan Tolhoek	Peter Sagan	Silvan Dillier	Lotto–Soudal	Jérémy Maison
5	Darwin Atapuma	Pierre Latour	Antwan Tolhoek	Peter Sagan	Mathias Frank	Team Sky	Darwin Atapuma
6	Pieter Weening	Wilco Kelderman	Antwan Tolhoek	Maximiliano Richeze	Martin Elmiger	Lotto–Soudal	Pieter Weening
7	Tejay van Garderen	Warren Barguil	Antwan Tolhoek	Maximiliano Richeze	Martin Elmiger	Team Katusha	Matthias Brändle
8	Ion Izagirre	Miguel Ángel López	Antwan Tolhoek	Maximiliano Richeze	Martin Elmiger	Team Katusha	Ion Izagirre
9	Jarlinson Pantano	Miguel Ángel López	Antwan Tolhoek	Maximiliano Richeze	Martin Elmiger	Team Katusha	Miguel Ángel López
Final		Miguel Ángel López	Antwan Tolhoek	Maximiliano Richeze	Martin Elmiger	Team Katusha	not awarded

Notes

- In stage 2, Jürgen Roelandts, who was second in the points classification, wore the black jersey, because Fabian Cancellara (in first place) wore the yellow jersey as leader of the general classification during that stage. Martin Elmiger, who was second in the Swiss rider classification, wore the red jersey, because Fabian Cancellara (in first place) wore the yellow jersey as leader of the overall classification during that stage.
- In stage 3, Martin Elmiger, who was second in the Swiss rider classification, wore the red jersey, because Fabian Cancellara (in first place) wore the black jersey as leader of the points classification during that stage.
- In stage 4, Fabian Cancellara, who was third in the points classification, wore the black jersey, because Peter Sagan (in first place) wore the yellow jersey as leader of the overall classification and Silvan Dillier (in second place) wore the red jersey as the leader of the Swiss rider classification during that stage.
- In stage 5, Maximiliano Richeze, who was second in the points classification, wore the black jersey, because Peter Sagan (in first place) wore the yellow jersey as leader of the overall classification during that stage.
