= Emanuel Saldaño =

Argentine cyclist

Personal information
- Full name: Emanuel Saldaño
- Nickname: Chino
- Born: 16 May 1985 San Juan, Argentina
- Died: 25 January 2014 (aged 28) El Encón, San Juan Province, Argentina

Cycling career
- Sport: Cycling
- Current team: Forjar Salud UOM
- Disciplines: Road, Track
- Role: Rider
- Rider type: All-rounder

Major wins
- Vuelta a Lavalle, 1 Stage (2009); Giro del Sol (2010); Argentina National Road Race Champion (2011)

Marcelo Saldaño (16 May 1985 – 25 January 2014) was an Argentine road racing cyclist and track cyclist for amateur team Forjar Salud UOM.

Born in San Juan, he was the Argentine 2011 national road race champion.

Saldaño died on 25 January 2014 when the pickup truck he was driving overturned near El Encón, San Juan Province.

== Palmares ==
- Vuelta a San Juan - 1 stage (2006)
- Vuelta a la Bebida - 1 stage (2009)
- Vuelta a Lavalle - 1 stage (2009)
- Vuelta a San Juan - 1 stage (2010)
- Giro del Sol - 1 stage & Overall (2010)
- Vuelta de Albardón (2010)
- Doble Chepes - 1 stage (2011)
- Argentina National Road Race Champion (2011)
