= Darío Díaz =

Argentine cyclist

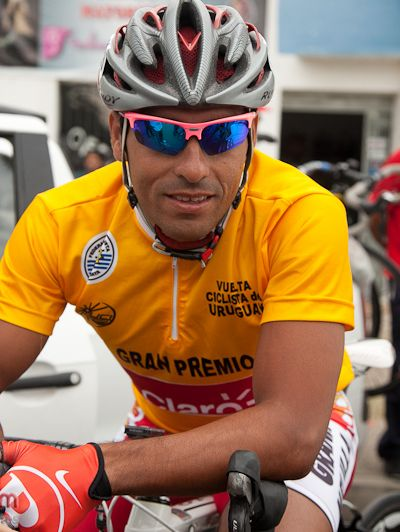
- Díaz in 2012

Personal information
- Full name: Darío Raúl Antonio Díaz
- Born: 13 July 1981 (age 45) San Fernando del Valle de Catamarca, Argentina

Cycling career
- Sport: Cycling
- Current team: Transportes Puertas de Cuyo
- Discipline: Road
- Role: Rider

Amateur teams
- 2010: Equipo Continental Municipalidad de Pocito
- 2011–2012: Villa Teresa
- 2013: Municipalidad de Rawson

Professional teams
- 2015–2016: Sindicato de Empleados Publicos de San Juan
- 2018–: Asociación Civil Mardan

Darío Raúl Antonio Díaz (born July 13, 1981, in San Fernando del Valle de Catamarca) is an Argentine professional racing cyclist, who currently rides for UCI Continental team Transportes Puertas de Cuyo.

== Major results ==
2003
1st Road race, National Under-23 Road Championships
2005
1st Prologue Vuelta a San Juan
2007
1st Overall Giro del Sol San Juan
Vuelta a Mendoza

1st Prologue, Stages 1, 2, 3 & 5

2nd Overall Vuelta a San Juan

1st Stages 5, 6, 8 & 10

2nd Subida a El Jumeal
2008
1st Overall Doble Calingasta
1st Stage 1 Vuelta a San Juan
4th Road race, National Road Championships
2011
Rutas de América

1st Stages 1 & 3

2nd Overall Vuelta del Uruguay

1st Stages 1, 2, 8, 9, 10 & 11

2012
1st Road race, National Road Championships
Vuelta del Uruguay

1st Stages 4 & 9

2013
Vuelta a San Juan

1st Stages 1 & 2

2015
1st Sprints classification Vuelta del Uruguay
2016
1st Stage 6 Vuelta a San Juan
2020
3rd Overall Giro del Sol San Juan

1st Stage 1
