= Fernando Antogna =

Argentine cyclist (born 1976)

Personal information
- Born: December 21, 1976 (age 49) Chivilcoy, Buenos Aires Province, Argentina

Sport
- Sport: Cycling
Medal record
Representing Argentina
Pan American Games
Bronze medal – third place	2007 Rio de Janeiro	Individual pursuit
South American Games
Bronze medal – third place	2002 Belem	Individual pursuit
Bronze medal – third place	2002 Belem	Team pursuit
Bronze medal – third place	2006 Buenos Aires	Team pursuit
Bronze medal – third place	2010 Medellin	Team pursuit

Jose Fernando Antogna (born December 21, 1976) is a male professional track and road cyclist from Argentina.

== Career ==
2002
3rd in Doble Difunta Corréa (ARG)
2003
2nd in Stage 5 Vuelta a San Juan, San Juan (ARG)
2nd in General Classification Vuelta de San Juan (ARG)
3rd in Stage 5 part A Clásica del Oeste-Doble Bragado, Bragado (ARG)
3rd in General Classification Clásica del Oeste-Doble Bragado (ARG)
1st in Stage 1 Vuelta a Mendoza (ARG)
2nd in Stage 2 Vuelta a Mendoza (ARG)
3rd in Argentina National Championship, Track, Pursuit, Elite/U23, Cordoba (ARG)
3rd in Argentina National Championship, Track, Points race, Elite/U23, Cordoba (ARG)
1st in Prologue Vuelta al Valle, Allen (ARG)
1st in Stage 1 Vuelta al Valle, Allen (ARG)
1st in Stage 4 Vuelta al Valle, Catriel (ARG)
1st in General Classification Vuelta al Valle (ARG)
2005
1st in Stage 3 Clásica del Oeste-Doble Bragado, Pergamino (ARG)
2nd in Stage 6 part A Clásica del Oeste-Doble Bragado (ARG)
2nd in General Classification Clásica del Oeste-Doble Bragado (ARG)
(silver) in Pan American Championships, Track, Team Pursuit, Mar del Plata (ARG)
2006
1st in Stage 2 Clásica del Oeste-Doble Bragado, Chacabuco (ARG)
1st in Stage 3 Clásica del Oeste-Doble Bragado, Pergamino (ARG)
3rd in Stage 6 Vuelta Ciclista Por Un Chile Lider, Sewel (CHI)
2nd in Stage 1 Doble San Francisco-Miramar (ARG)
2nd in General Classification Doble San Francisco-Miramar (ARG)
(silver) in Pan American Championships, Track, Team Pursuit, Sao Paulo (BRA)
2007
1st in Prologue Tour de San Luis, San Luis (ARG)
1st in Stage 2 Tour de San Luis, Quines (ARG)
2nd in General Classification Tour de San Luis (ARG)
2nd in Stage 1 Clásica del Oeste-Doble Bragado, Mercedes (ARG)
3rd in Stage 2 Clásica del Oeste-Doble Bragado, Chacabuco (ARG)
3rd in Stage 6 part a Clásica del Oeste-Doble Bragado, Bragado (ARG)
3rd in General Classification Clásica del Oeste-Doble Bragado (ARG)
2nd in 100 Km de la Republica Argentina (ARG)
1st in Clasica 1° de Mayo Argentina (ARG)
(bronze) in Pan American Games, Track, Individual Pursuit, Rio de Janeiro (BRA)
1st in Stage 1 Vuelta al Valle, Allén (ARG)
1st in Stage 3 Vuelta al Valle, Allén (ARG)
2008
2nd in Prologue Tour de San Luis, San Luis (ARG)
1st in Prologue Clásica del Oeste-Doble Bragado, Suipacha (ARG)
2nd in 100 Km de la Republica Argentina (ARG)
2009
5th in General Classification Giro del Sol San Juan (ARG)
3rd in Stage 2 Giro del Sol San Juan, San Juan (ARG)
1st in Stage 2 Clásica del Oeste-Doble Bragado, Chacabuco (ARG)
2nd in Stage 5 Clásica del Oeste-Doble Bragado, Bragado (ARG)
1st in Stage 6 part a Clásica del Oeste-Doble Bragado (ARG)
2nd in General Classification Clásica del Oeste-Doble Bragado (ARG)
2nd in Memorial Julio Lino Latorre (ARG)
1st in General Clásica Mochila Armagno (ARG)
