= 2007 Clásica del Oeste-Doble Bragado =

The 2007 Clásica del Oeste-Doble Bragado was a men's road cycling race held from 5 to 11 February 2007 in Argentina. It was a multiple stage race over seven stages with a total length of 1146 kilometres.

== Stage Summary ==
Stage	Date	Start	Finish	Distance	Stage Top 3
1	5 February	3 de Febrero	Mercedes	133 km	(Argentina) Ángel Colla (Argentina) Fernando Antogna (Argentina) Gaston Corsaro
2	6 February	Mercedes	Chacabuco	171 km	(Argentina) Ángel Colla (Argentina) Gaston Corsaro (Argentina) Fernando Antogna
3	7 February	Chacabuco	Pergamino	156 km	(Argentina) Walter Pérez (Argentina) Alejandro Alberto Borrajo (Argentina) Raul Turano
4	8 February	Pergamino	Pergamino	144 km	(Argentina) Herminio Suarez (Argentina) Gustavo Borcard (Argentina) Claudio Flores
5	9 February	Pergamino	Bragado	207 km	(Argentina) Mauro Richeze (Argentina) Ángel Colla (Argentina) Walter Pérez
6A	10 February	Bragado	Bragado	17 km	(Argentina) Matías Médici (Argentina) Juan Curuchet (Argentina) Fernando Antogna
6B	10 February	Bragado	Bragado	122 km	(Argentina) Ángel Colla (Argentina) Juan Curuchet (Argentina) Sebastián Cancio
7	11 February	Bragado	Pablo Podesta	196 km	(Argentina) Gaston Corsaro (Argentina) Ángel Colla (Argentina) Mauro Richeze

=== General Classification ===
Pos	Rider	Time
1	(Argentina) Ángel Colla	24h 42m 19s
2	(Argentina) Juan Curuchet	+ 06s
3	(Argentina) Fernando Antogna	+ 24s
