= Matías Médici =

Argentine cyclist (born 1975)

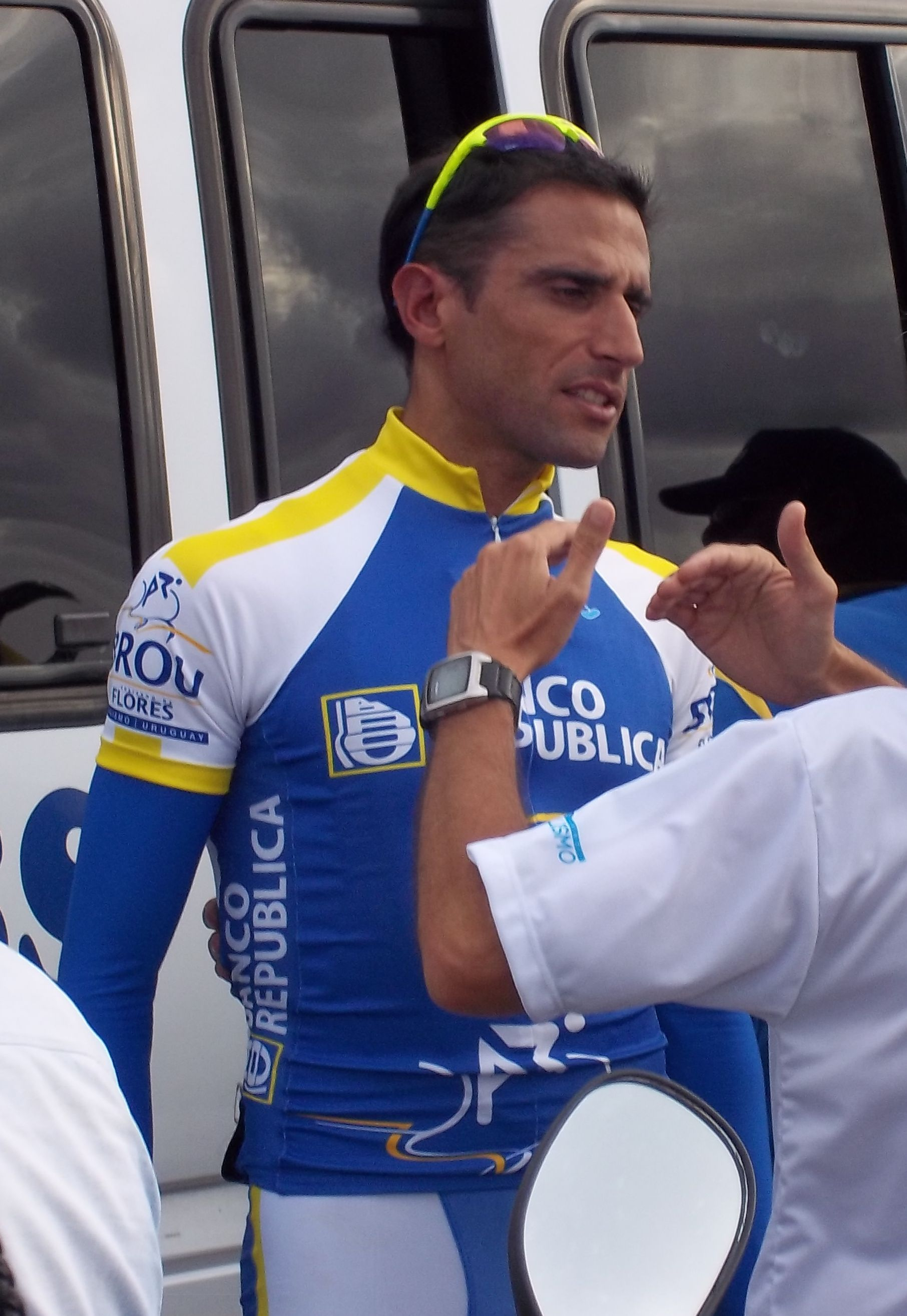

Personal information
- Full name: Matías Médici
- Born: 29 June 1975 (age 51) Ciudadela, Buenos Aires, Argentina
- Height: 1.89 m (6 ft 2 in)
- Weight: 70 kg (154 lb)

Cycling career
- Sport: Cycling
- Current team: Retired
- Disciplines: Track; Road
- Role: Rider
- Rider type: Time trialist

Amateur teams
- 1999–2000: Policial
- 2003: Municipalidad 3 de Febrero
- 2004: C.C. Fénix
- 2005: Avaí/Florianópolis
- 2006: Blumenau/DataRo/Pinarello
- 2009: Scott–Marcondes Cesar–São José dos Campos
- 2012: Porongos de Flores
- 2015–2020: Avaí–FME Florianópolis–APGF

Professional teams
- 2007–2008: Scott–Marcondes Cesar–São José dos Campos
- 2010: Scott–Marcondes Cesar–São José dos Campos
- 2011: Funvic–Pindamonhangaba

Major wins
- National Time Trial Championships (2006, 2008, 2010)
Medal record
Men's road bicycle racing
Representing Argentina
Pan American Championships
Silver medal – second place	2008 Montevideo	Time trial
Bronze medal – third place	2009 Hidalgo	Time trial

Matías Médici (born 29 June 1975 in Ciudadela, Buenos Aires) is an Argentine former professional track and road cyclist. He represented his native country at the 2008 Summer Olympics in Beijing, PR China.

== Doping ==
Médici tested positive for EPO at the 2012 Rutas de América and received a two-year suspension for doping.

== Major results ==
2003
1st Prologue Rutas de América
Vuelta del Uruguay

1st Stages 5 & 8 (ITT)

3rd Time trial, National Road Championships
2004
1st Overall Rutas de América

1st Stage 7b (ITT)

1st Overall Tour de Santa Catarina

1st Prologue & Stage 8b (ITT)

3rd Time trial, National Road Championships
6th Overall Volta do Paraná
6th Overall Vuelta del Uruguay

1st Stages 5 & 8 (ITT)

2005
1st Overall Rutas de América

1st Stage 7b

1st Stage 2b (ITT) Volta de Porto Alegre
1st Prologue Tour de Santa Catarina
2nd Overall Volta de Ciclismo Internacional do Estado de São Paulo
9th Time trial, UCI Road World Championships
2006
1st Time trial, South American Games
1st Time trial, National Road Championships
1st Overall Doble Bragado

1st Stage 6a

5th Overall Vuelta Ciclista de Chile

1st Prologue

8th Time trial, Pan American Road Championships
8th Overall Volta de Ciclismo Internacional do Estado de São Paulo

1st Stage 6 (ITT)

2007
1st Overall Volta do Rio de Janeiro

1st Stage 2 (ITT)

1st Stage 6a (ITT) Clásica del Oeste-Doble Bragado
1st Stage 1 Tour de Santa Catarina
2nd Time trial, Pan American Games
3rd Overall Volta de Ciclismo Internacional do Estado de São Paulo
6th Overall Tour de San Luis
9th Overall Vuelta por un Chile Líder
2008
1st Time trial, National Road Championships
1st Clasica 1° de Mayo
Vuelta a Mendoza

1st Stages 6 & 8

1st Stage 9a Vuelta del Uruguay
1st Stage 1 Volta das Satélites
Pan American Road Championships

2nd Time trial
5th Road race

3rd Volta Inconfidencia Mineira
3rd Copa Recife Speed Bike
2009
1st Overall 500 Millas del Norte

1st Stage 5

2nd Time trial, National Road Championships
2nd Overall Vuelta a San Juan

1st Stage 3

3rd Time trial, Pan American Road Championships
5th Overall Volta de Ciclismo Internacional do Estado de São Paulo
8th Overall Giro del Sol San Juan
2010
1st Time trial, National Road Championships
1st Stage 5 Volta do Paraná
4th Time trial, Pan American Road Championships
2011
2nd Time trial, Pan American Games
2nd Time trial, National Road Championships
9th Overall Rutas de América
2012
~~1st Time trial, Pan American Road Championships~~
~~3rd Overall Rutas de América~~

~~1st Stage 4b (ITT)~~

2015
2nd Time trial, National Road Championships
2016
5th Overall Vuelta del Uruguay
8th Overall Volta Ciclística Internacional do Rio Grande do Sul
2017
1st Overall Rutas de América

1st Stage 3b
