= Carì =

Swiss village

Coordinates: 46°29′37″N 8°49′00″E

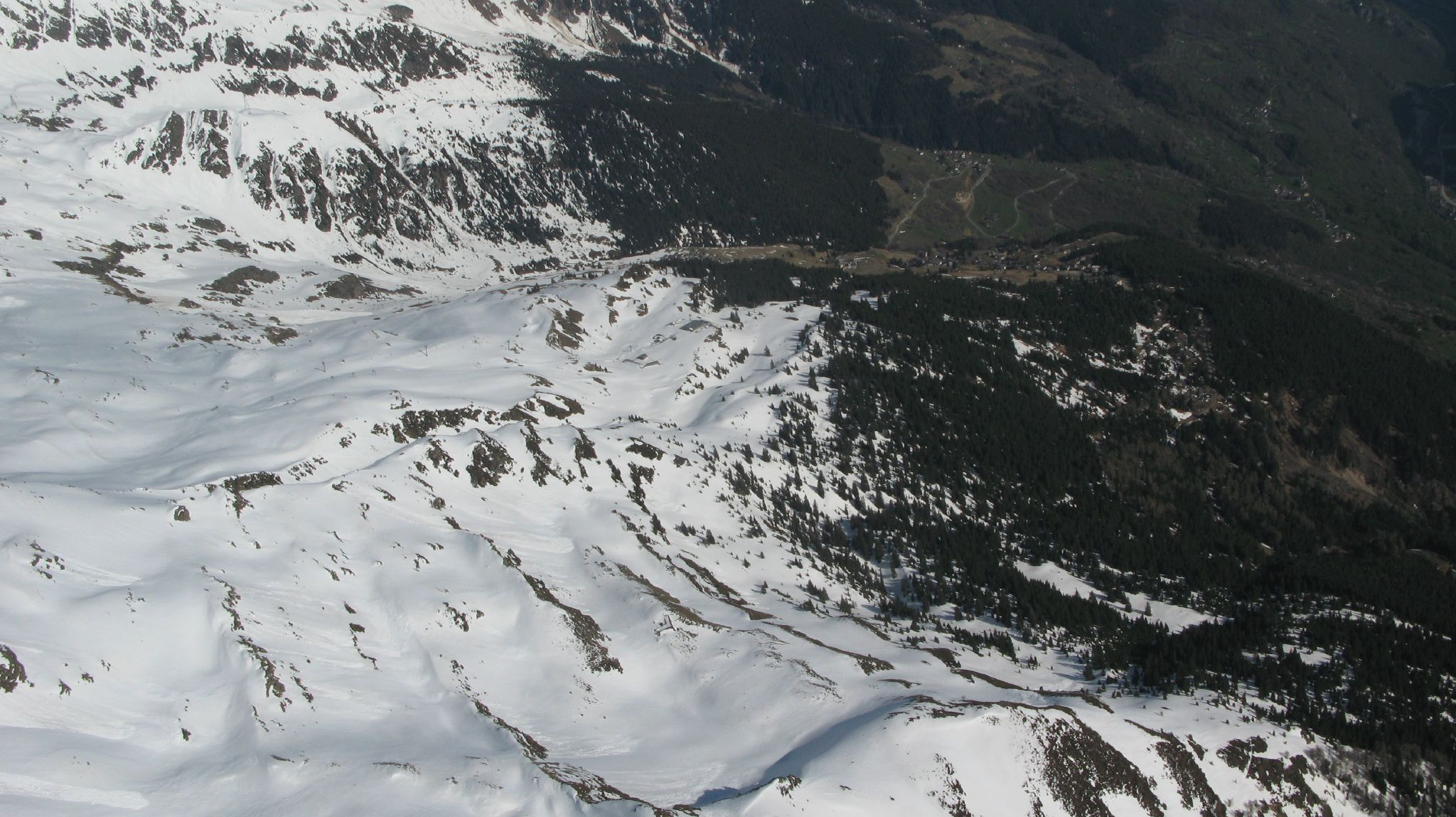
Aerial view of Carì

Carì (formerly known as Maiensäss) is a village in the Swiss Alps, located in the canton of Ticino. The village is situated in the northern part of the canton, in the Leventina valley, above Faido. It belongs to the latter municipality.

Carì sits on a sunny terrace at a height of 1,642 metres (5,387 ft) above sea level, on the southern flanks of Pizzo di Campello. Since 1950, the village has developed into one of the most popular alpine tourist resorts of the canton. It is now inhabited all year round, making Carì the highest permanent settlement in the canton of Ticino.

In winter, Carì includes 20 kilometres (12 mi) of pistes up to Lago di Carì (2,280 metres (7,480 ft)).

The Gotthard Base Tunnel runs below Carì, over one kilometre (0.62 mi) below the ground. At that point is the Faido multifunction station.
