= Vicente Rojas =

Chilean cyclist

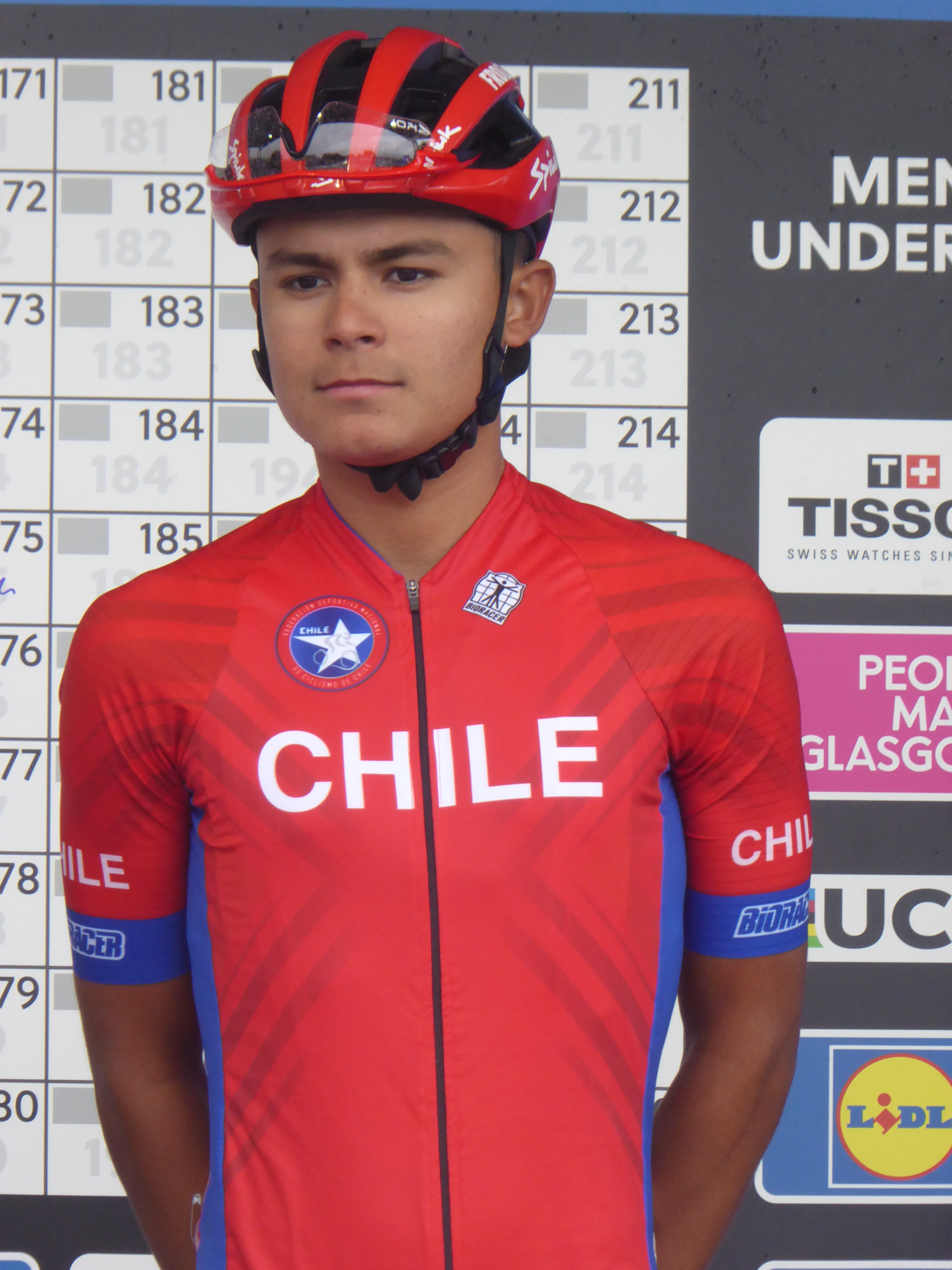
- Rojas at the 2023 UCI Road World Championships

Personal information
- Born: 30 April 2002 (age 24) Santiago, Chile
- Height: 1.69 m (5 ft 7 in)

Cycling career
- Sport: Cycling
- Current team: Bardiani–CSF 7 Saber
- Discipline: Road
- Role: Rider

Amateur teams
- 2021: Futuro Sport
- 2022: Team CRC
- 2023: Supermercados Froiz

Professional teams
- 2022: Swift Carbon Pro Cycling Brasil
- 2024–: VF Group–Bardiani–CSF–Faizanè

Vicente Rojas Naranjo (born 30 April 2002) is a Chilean racing cyclist, who currently rides for UCI ProTeam Bardiani–CSF 7 Saber.

== Major results ==
2022
1st Road race, National Under-23 Road Championships
3rd Road race, Pan American Under-23 Road Championships
2023
1st Road race, Pan American Under-23 Road Championships
1st Clásica de Pascua
2nd Overall Giro del Sol San Juan

1st Young rider classification

2nd Overall Volta a Portugal do Futuro

1st Stage 3

2nd Overall Vuelta a Salamanca

1st Stage 2

2024
4th Overall Giro della Valle d'Aosta
4th Eschborn–Frankfurt Under-23
8th Overall Alpes Isère Tour
2025
3rd Trofeo Città di Castelfidardo
