= Ricardo Julio =

Argentine racing cyclist (born 1976)

Personal information
- Born: January 13, 1976 (age 50)

Cycling career
- Sport: Cycling
- Discipline: Road racing
- Role: Rider

Ricardo Daniel ("Turco") Julio (born January 13, 1976) is an Argentine professional racing cyclist.

== Career highlights ==
2008
3rd in Stage 7 Vuelta a San Juan (ARG)
2008
3rd in General Classification Vuelta a San Juan (ARG)
