= Moreno (footballer, born 1983) =

Brazilian footballer

Personal information
- Full name: Moreno Aoas Vidal
- Date of birth: 23 February 1983 (age 43)
- Place of birth: São Paulo, Brazil
- Height: 1.81 m (5 ft 11 in)
- Position: Left-back

Youth career
- 2000: Juventus-SP
- 2001–2002: Corinthians

Senior career*
Years	Team	Apps	(Gls)
2003–2005	Corinthians	26	(0)
2005	→ Chiasso (loan)	14	(1)
2005–2006	Atlético-PR	9	(0)
2007	Santa Cruz	0	(0)
2007	Fortaleza	0	(0)
2007	Botafogo	10	(0)
2008–2009	Udinese	0	(0)
2009	→ Eupen (loan)	10	(0)
2010	Guarani	12	(0)
2011	São Bernardo	0	(0)
2012	Marcílio Dias	0	(0)
2012	Bragantino	16	(0)
2013	Uberlândia		
- * Club domestic league appearances and goals

Moreno Aoas Vidal or simply Moreno (born 23 February 1983) is a Brazilian former professional footballer who played as a left-back.

== Career ==
Moreno was signed for Udinese in January 2008. He previously played for Botafogo, signed a 6-month contract in June 2007.

In January 2009 he left for Eupen on loan. In June 2009 he was released by Udinese.

In February 2010, he signed a one-year contract with Guarani.

In international level, he played for Brazil at 2003 Pan American Games.

== Honours ==
- Tournament Rio - São Paulo: 2002
- Brazilian Cup: 2002
- São Paulo State League: 2003
- Ceará State League: 2007
