= Luciano Montivero =

Argentinian bicycle racer

Personal information
- Full name: Luciano Antonio Montivero
- Born: 21 September 1978 (age 48)

Cycling career
- Sport: Cycling
- Current team: Agrupación Virgen de Fátima–San Juan Biker Motos
- Discipline: Road
- Role: Rider

Amateur teams
- 2003: Palmar del Lago
- 2005–2007: Puertas de Cuyo
- 2008: La Rioja–Litos
- 2009–2011: Agrupación Virgen de Fátima
- 2010: Shania Competición
- 2011: Municipalidad de Guaymallén
- 2012: Andalucía–Kohlberg
- 2014–2016: A.C. Agrupación Virgen de Fátima

Professional team
- 2017–: A.C. Agrupación Virgen de Fátima

Luciano Antonio Montivero (born 21 September 1978) is an Argentine road cyclist, who currently rides for UCI Continental team Agrupación Virgen de Fátima–San Juan Biker Motos.

== Major results ==
2002
1st Overall Giro del Sol San Juan
2004
1st Overall Giro del Sol San Juan
5th Time trial, National Road Championships
10th Overall Vuelta del Uruguay
2005
1st Overall Vuelta a San Juan

1st Stage 8

5th Road race, National Road Championships
2007
1st Overall Vuelta a San Juan
3rd Overall Vuelta a Mendoza
5th Road race, National Road Championships
2009
3rd Overall Vuelta a San Juan

1st Stage 6

2010
1st Stage 9 Vuelta a Mendoza
2nd Overall Vuelta a San Juan
3rd Overall Doble Calingasta
2011
1st Overall Vuelta a Mendoza

1st Prologue (TTT) & Stage 9

2nd Road race, National Road Championships
2014
1st Overall Doble Calingasta
2017
1st Prologue (TTT) Giro del Sol San Juan
