= Jardel (footballer, born 1983) =

Brazilian footballer

Personal information
- Full name: Jardel Pereira de Souza
- Date of birth: January 27, 1983 (age 43)
- Place of birth: Araguaína, Brazil
- Height: 1.76 m (5 ft 9 in)
- Position: Midfielder

Team information
- Current team: Santo André

Youth career
- 1996–1997: Araguainense
- 1998: Clube dos 30
- 1999: Rio Branco-SP
- 1999: Clube dos 30

Senior career*
Years	Team	Apps	(Gls)
1999–2005	Cruzeiro	47	(4)
2005	→ Juventude (loan)	17	(1)
2005–2007	Marítimo	7	(0)
2007–2008	Cruzeiro	2	(0)
2008–2009	Estrela Amadora	24	(4)
2010	Feirense	11	(1)
2010–2011	Penafiel	11	(1)
2011	Caldense	8	(2)
2011	Ituiutaba	0	(0)
2012	Ceará		
2013	Santo André		

International career
2003	Brazil U20	4	(0)
- * Club domestic league appearances and goals as of 18 April 2013

Jardel Pereira de Souza (born 27 January 1983), or simply Jardel, is a Brazilian footballer who plays for Esporte Clube Santo André as a central midfielder.

== Club career ==
Jardel started his professional career at Cruzeiro Esporte Clube in 1999 at the age of 16, and made his Série A debut against Botafogo de Futebol e Regatas. He also helped the team win the 2003 Brazilian Cup, against Clube de Regatas do Flamengo.

In 2005 Jardel was loaned to Esporte Clube Juventude, being released by Cruzeiro shortly after. He then moved to Portugal, first appearing for C.S. Marítimo (only seven top division games and just four with the reserves, during nearly two full seasons). After an unassuming spell in his country with former team Cruzeiro, he returned to Portugal and played for C.F. Estrela da Amadora, C.D. Feirense and F.C. Penafiel, the first in the top division (scoring four goals in an eventual relegation due to irregularities).

Jardel returned to his country on 9 February 2011, moving to Associação Atlética Caldense. On 16 May, Série B side Ituiutaba Esporte Clube signed him for one season.

== International career ==
Jardel was part of the Brazilian under-20 team that won the 2003 FIFA World Youth Championship in the United Arab Emirates. He appeared in four games during the tournament, including the 1–0 final win against Spain (90 minutes played).

== Honours ==
=== Club ===
Cruzeiro

- Brazilian League: 2003
- Brazilian Cup: 2003
- Minas Gerais State League: 2003, 2004, 2008

=== Country ===
- FIFA U-20 World Cup: 2003
