= Pedro González (cyclist) =

Argentine cyclist

Personal information
- Full name: Pedro Cristian González
- Born: 4 June 1983 (age 43)

Cycling career
- Sport: Cycling
- Current team: Chimbas Te Quiero
- Discipline: Road
- Role: Rider

Amateur teams
- 2015–2016: Municipalidad de Pocito
- 2019–2021: Construcciones Ureña

Professional teams
- 2017–2018: Equipo Continental Municipalidad de Pocito
- 2022–: Chimbas Te Quiero

Pedro Cristian González (born 4 June 1983) is an Argentine professional racing cyclist, who currently rides for UCI Continental team Chimbas Te Quiero.

== Major results ==
2007
7th Overall Vuelta a San Juan
2008
1st Overall Vuelta a San Juan
2010
3rd Road race, National Road Championships
10th Overall Vuelta a San Juan
2012
1st Stage 5 Vuelta a San Juan
2013
3rd Overall Giro del Sol San Juan
