= Marcos Galarza =

Argentine footballer

Personal information
- Full name: Marcos Adrián Galarza
- Date of birth: April 3, 1984 (age 42)
- Place of birth: Morón, Argentina
- Height: 1.80 m (5 ft 11 in)
- Position: Right back

Senior career*
Years	Team	Apps	(Gls)
2002–2009	Banfield	126	(5)
2009	Hapoel Be'er Sheva	8	(0)
2010–2014	San Martín de San Juan	55	(1)
2012–2013	→ Banfield (loan)	19	(0)
2014–2015	Nueva Chicago	45	(0)

International career
2003	Argentina U-20	4	(1)
- * Club domestic league appearances and goals

Marcos Adrián Galarza (born 3 April 1984 in Morón, Buenos Aires) is an Argentine retired football defender.

Galarza made his professional debut for Banfield in 2002. He went on to make over 100 appearances for the club. in 2003 he was part of the Argentina squad that won the Pan American Games football tournament.

== Honours ==
Season	Team	Title
2003	Argentina U-20	Pan American Games Gold medal
