= Bardiani–CSF 7 Saber =

Italian cycling team

Bardiani–CSF 7-Saber
Team information
- UCI code: BCS
- Registered: Italy
- Founded: 1982
- Discipline: Road
- Status: UCI ProTeam
- Bicycles: De Rosa
- Website: Team home page

Key personnel
- General manager: Roberto Reverberi

Team name history
| 1982–1983 | Termolan |
| 1984–1986 | Santini |
| 1987–1989 | Selca |
| 1990–1992 | Italbonifica–Navigare |
| 1993–1995 | Navigare–Blue Storm |
| 1996 | Scrigno–Blue Storm |
| 1997–1998 | Scrigno–Gaerne |
| 1999 | Navigare–Gaerne |
| 2000 | Ceramica Panaria–Gaerne |
| 2001–2003 | Ceramiche Panaria–Fiordo |
| 2004 | Ceramiche Panaria–Margres |
| 2005–2007 | Ceramica Panaria–Navigare |
| 2008–2009 | CSF Group–Navigare |
| 2010–2011 | Colnago–CSF Inox |
| 2012 | Colnago–CSF Bardiani |
| 2013 | Bardiani Valvole–CSF Inox |
| 2014–2019 | Bardiani–CSF |
| 2020–2022 | Bardiani–CSF–Faizanè |
| 2023 | Green Project–Bardiani–CSF–Faizanè |
| 2024–2025 | VF Group–Bardiani–CSF–Faizanè |
| 2026– | Bardiani–CSF 7-Saber |

Bardiani–CSF 7 Saber (UCI team code: BCS) is a UCI ProTeam cycling team registered in Italy that participates in UCI Continental Circuits races and when selected as a wildcard to UCI World Tour events. The team is managed by Bruno Reverberi with assistance from directeurs sportifs Fabiano Fontanelli and Roberto Reverberi. Reverberi has managed the team since 1982, when it started as Termolan. Navigare was an on-and-off title sponsor since 1990, when the team was called Italbonifica-Navigare. The current main sponsor, Bardiani Valvole, became associated with the team in 2013, prior to which CSF Group (2008–12) and Ceramica Panaria (2000–2007) were main sponsors.

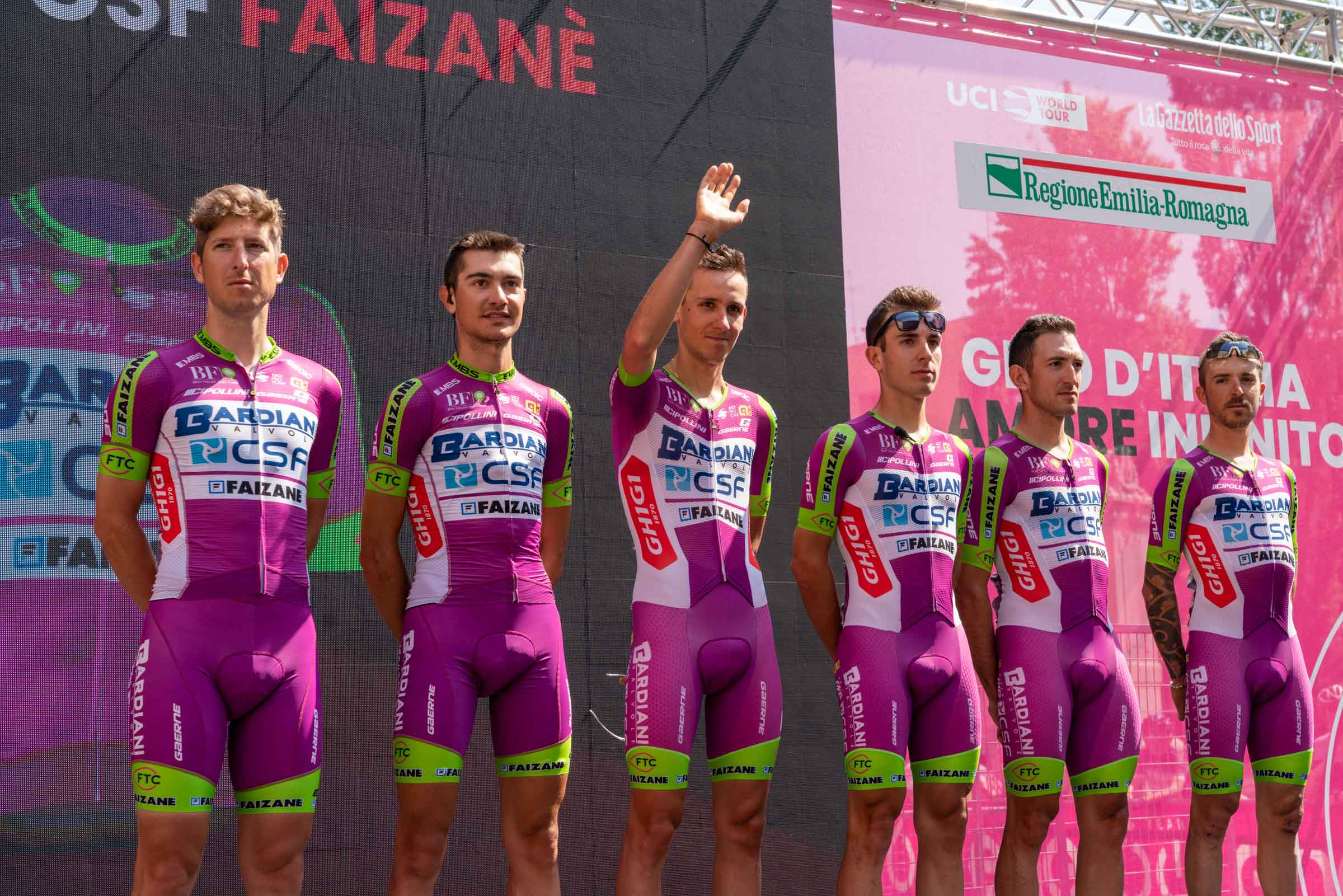
The team at the 2022 Giro d'Italia

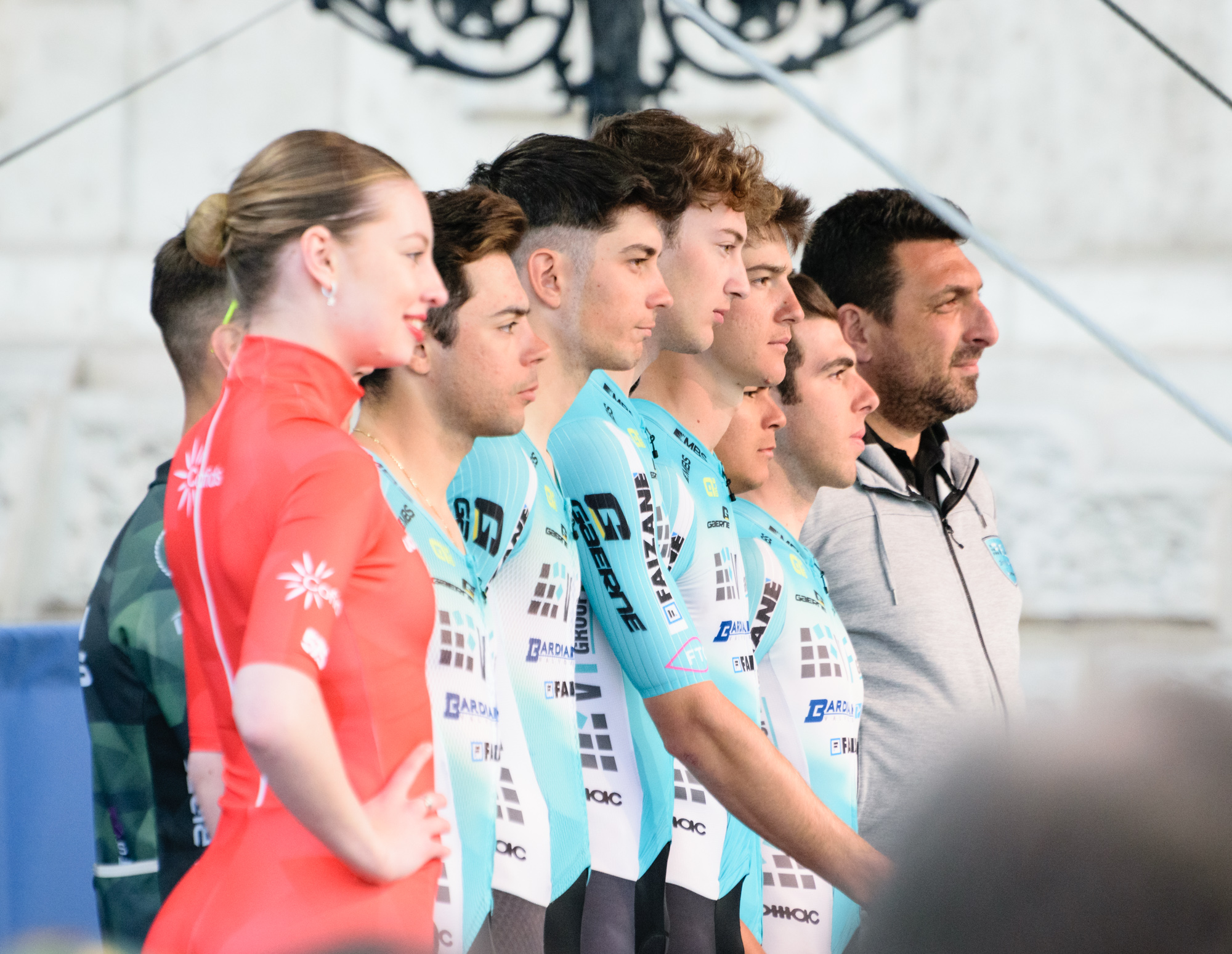
The team at the 2025 Tour de Hongrie

== Doping ==
On the eve of the 2017 Giro d'Italia, the UCI announced that both Stefano Pirazzi and Nicola Ruffoni had given adverse analytical findings (AAFs) for growth hormone-releasing peptides (GHRPs) in samples collected during out-of-competition doping tests conducted on 25 and 26 April 2017. With the team incurring first and second AAFs within a twelve-month period, the UCI aimed to enforce article 7.12.1 of the UCI Anti-Doping Rules, allowing for suspension of the team from 15 to 45 days – casting doubt on their Giro appearance.

In October 2017, the team announced that Michael Bresciani had tested positive for the banned diuretic furosemide in his first race as a professional. Diuretics can be used as masking agents for other illegal doping products. The team could now face a 12-month ban due to a third doping case in a given year. Bresciani was hired by the team in order to fill the vacant spots left by Pirazzi and Ruffoni's dismissals.

== Team roster ==
As of 14 January 2025.

| Rider | Date of birth |
|---|---|
| Federico Biagini (ITA) | 20 June 2003 (age 23) |
| Filippo Cettolin (ITA) | 23 June 2006 (age 20) |
| Luca Colnaghi (ITA) | 14 January 1999 (age 27) |
| Lorenzo Conforti (ITA) | 22 May 2004 (age 22) |
| Luca Covili (ITA) | 10 February 1997 (age 29) |
| Edward Cruz (COL) | 5 July 2006 (age 20) |
| Santiago Ferraro (ITA) | 20 September 2006 (age 20) |
| Filippo Fiorelli (ITA) | 19 November 1994 (age 31) |
| Martin Santiago Herreño (COL) | 13 September 2006 (age 20) |
| Filippo Magli (ITA) | 29 April 1999 (age 27) |
| Martin Marcellusi (ITA) | 5 April 2000 (age 26) |
| Alessio Martinelli (ITA) | 26 April 2001 (age 25) |

| Rider | Date of birth |
|---|---|
| Andrea Montagner (ITA) | 15 February 2006 (age 20) |
| Luca Paletti (ITA) | 5 June 2004 (age 22) |
| Alessandro Pinarello (ITA) | 12 July 2003 (age 23) |
| Mattia Pinazzi (ITA) | 4 April 2001 (age 25) |
| Vicente Rojas (CHI) | 30 April 2002 (age 24) |
| Matteo Scalco (ITA) | 25 June 2004 (age 22) |
| Manuele Tarozzi (ITA) | 20 June 1998 (age 28) |
| Alex Tolio (ITA) | 30 March 2000 (age 26) |
| Filippo Turconi (ITA) | 20 October 2005 (age 20) |
| Enrico Zanoncello (ITA) | 2 August 1997 (age 29) |
| Mattia Stenico (ITA) | 26 September 2006 (age 20) |

== National and Continental champions ==
1998
Ukraine Road Race Championships, Vladimir Duma
2000
Ukraine Road Race Championships, Vladimir Duma
2002
Australia Time Trial Championships, Nathan O'Neill
2003
Ukraine Time Trial Championships, Sergiy Matveyev
2022
Italian Road Race Championships, Filippo Zana
2025
Pan American U23 Road Race Championship, Vicente Rojas
