= Fabian Velardes =

Argentine boxer

Personal information
- Nationality: Argentina
- Born: Fabian Leonardo Velardes; March 6, 1984 (age 42) La Calera, Córdoba Province
- Weight: Middleweight

Boxing career
- Stance: Orthodox

Boxing record
- Total fights: 22
- Wins: 9
- Win by KO: 4
- Losses: 13
- Draws: 0
- No contests: 0

Fabian Velardes (born March 6, 1984, in La Calera, Córdoba Province) is a male middleweight boxer from Argentina. As an amateur Velardes competed for his native country at the 2003 Pan American Games in Santo Domingo, Dominican Republic, where he was stopped in the quarterfinals of the men's welterweight division (– 69 kg) by Cuba's eventual gold medalist Lorenzo Aragón. Velardes made his professional debut on February 5, 2005, against Alberto Gustavo Torres.
