= Gerardo Fernández (cyclist) =

Argentine cyclist

Personal information
- Full name: Gerardo Luis Fernández
- Born: 29 March 1977 (age 49) Lobería, Argentina

Cycling career
- Sport: Cycling
- Current team: Retired
- Discipline: Road
- Role: Rider

Professional teams
- 2003–2005: Antarte–Rota dos Móveis
- 2006: Viña Magna–Cropu

Major wins
- National Road Race Championships (2008)

Gerardo Luis Fernández (born 29 March 1977) is a former road racing cyclist from Argentina, who was a professional from 2003 to 2006.

== Major achievements ==
2005
1st Overall Troféu Joaquim Agostinho

1st Stage 2

2006
1st Overall Vuelta a San Juan
2007
1st Stage 3 Tour do Brasil
2nd Overall Volta do Paraná

1st Points classification

National Road Championships

3rd Road race
4th Time trial

2008
1st Road race, National Road Championships
1st Overall Giro del Sol San Juan
1st Overall Doble Bragado

1st Stage 6b

1st Stage 2 Vuelta a Bolivia
2nd Overall Tour de San Luis
2009
1st Overall Vuelta a San Juan
2nd Overall Vuelta a Mendoza

1st Stages 1, 3, 5 & 8

National Road Championships

3rd Road race
3rd Time trial

4th Overall Giro del Sol San Juan

1st Stage 3

2011
7th Overall Tour de San Luis
2014
1st Stage 4 Vuelta del Uruguay
