= Pizzo di Campello =

Mountain of the Swiss Lepontine Alps

- Location within Switzerland

Highest point
- Elevation: 2,660 m (8,730 ft)
- Prominence: 217 m (712 ft)
- Parent peak: Pizzo del Sole
- Coordinates: 46°30′57.6″N 8°49′36.8″E

Geography
- Location: Ticino, Switzerland
- Parent range: Lepontine Alps

Pizzo di Campello is a mountain of the Swiss Lepontine Alps, overlooking Faido in the canton of Ticino. It lies between the main Leventina valley and the valley of Blenio.
