= Giro del Sol San Juan =

Race details
- Date: January
- Region: San Juan Province, Argentina
- Discipline: Road
- Competition: National; UCI America Tour (2009, 2023–)
- Type: Stage race

History
- First edition: 2002
- Editions: 21 (as of 2023)
- First winner: Luciano Montivero (ARG)
- Most wins: Nicolás Naranjo (ARG) (3 wins)
- Most recent: Maximiliano Navarrete (ARG)

The Giro del Sol San Juan is a multi-day road cycling race held annually in Argentina. It takes place in January in the province of San Juan. It has been held as a 2.2 event on the UCI America Tour in 2009 and again since 2023.

== Winners ==
Year	Winner	Second	Third
2002	(Argentina) Luciano Montivero
2003	(Argentina) Guillermo Brunetta
2004	(Argentina) Luciano Montivero
2005	(Argentina) Guillermo Brunetta
2006	(Argentina) Jorge Pi	(Argentina) Sergio Montivero	(Argentina) Alejandro Borrajo
2007	(Argentina) Darío Díaz
2008	(Argentina) Gerardo Fernández
2009	(Argentina) Emanuel Saldaño	(Argentina) Claudio Flores	(Argentina) Jorge Giacinti
2010	(Argentina) Emanuel Saldaño	(Argentina) Juan Pablo Dotti	(Argentina) Juan Gáspari
2011	(Argentina) Matías Médici	(Argentina) Juan Pablo Dotti	(Argentina) Jorge Pi
2012	(Argentina) Juan Pablo Dotti	(Argentina) Jorge Giacinti	(Argentina) Cristian Clavero
2013	(Argentina) Cristian Clavero	(Argentina) Jorge Giacinti	(Argentina) Pedro González
2015	(Argentina) Daniel Zamora	(Argentina) Diego Tivani	(Argentina) Mauricio Muller
2016	(Argentina) Elías Pereyra	(Argentina) Nicolás Naranjo	(Argentina) Juan Pablo Dotti
2017	(Argentina) Ricardo Escuela	(Argentina) Gerardo Tivani	(Argentina) Josué Moyano
2018	(Argentina) Nicolás Naranjo	(Argentina) Mauricio Quiroga	(Chile) Marco Arriagada
2019	(Argentina) Nicolás Naranjo	(Argentina) Gerardo Tivani	(Argentina) Emiliano Contreras
2020	(Argentina) Nicolás Naranjo	(Argentina) Laureano Rosas	(Argentina) Darío Díaz
2021	(Argentina) Nicolás Tivani	(Argentina) Alberto Alvárez	(Argentina) Alejandro Quilci
2022	(Argentina) Agustín Del Negro	(Argentina) Nicolás Tivani	(Argentina) Laureano Rosas
2023	(Argentina) Maximiliano Navarrete	(Chile) Vicente Rojas	(Argentina) Emiliano Contreras
