= Raúl Gorostegui =

Argentine footballer

Personal information
- Full name: Raúl Armando Gorostegui
- Date of birth: 13 May 1984 (age 42)
- Place of birth: Buenos Aires, Argentina
- Height: 1.70 m (5 ft 7 in)
- Position: Defender

Senior career*
Years	Team	Apps	(Gls)
2002–2005	Vélez Sarsfield	10	(0)
2006–2007	Instituto	30	(0)
2007–2008	Quilmes	35	(1)
2008–2009	Unión de Santa Fe	20	(0)
2009–2010	Juventud Antoniana		
2010	San Martín SJ	1	(0)
2011	Sarmiento	18	(0)
2011–2012	Juventud Antoniana		
2012–2013	Unión de Mar del Plata	20	(1)
2013–2014	Unión Guemes	7	(1)
2014–2017	Juventud Antoniana	78	(3)
2017–2018	Almirante Brown	13	(3)
- * Club domestic league appearances and goals as of 15:40, 27 March 2019 (UTC)

Raúl Armando Gorostegui (born 13 May 1984) is an Argentine professional footballer who plays for as a defender.

== Career ==
Born in Buenos Aires, Gorostegui has played for Club Atlético Vélez Sarsfield, Instituto, Quilmes, Unión de Santa Fe, Juventud Antoniana, San Martín de San Juan, Sarmiento, Unión de Mar del Plata, Unión Guemes and Almirante Brown.
