= Joel Barbosa =

Argentine footballer

Personal information
- Full name: Joel Enrique Barbosa
- Date of birth: 15 January 1983 (age 43)
- Place of birth: Córdoba, Argentina
- Height: 1.77 m (5 ft 10 in)
- Position: Defender

Youth career
- –2000: Boca Juniors

Senior career*
Years	Team	Apps	(Gls)
2000–2005	Boca Juniors	26	(0)
2004–2005	→ Almagro (loan)	29	(1)
2005–2006	Talleres	26	(0)
2007–2009	Nueva Chicago	32	(0)
2009–2011	Sarmiento	55	(2)
2011–2012	Central Norte	25	(3)
2012–2018	Brown	156	(7)
2018–2019	Atlanta	3	(0)

International career
2003	Argentina U20	4	(0)
2003	Argentina Olympic	5	(0)
- * Club domestic league appearances and goals as of 17 February 2019

Joel Barbosa (born 15 January 1983) is an Argentine footballer who plays as a defender.

== Titles ==
- Boca Juniors 2000 (Copa Libertadores, Intercontinental Cup and Torneo Apertura)
- Boca Juniors 2001 (Copa Libertadores)
- Boca Juniors 2003 (Copa Libertadores, Intercontinental Cup and Torneo Apertura)
