= Ángel Colla =

Argentine cyclist (born 1973)

Personal information
- Full name: Ángel Dario Colla Anacoreto
- Born: 8 September 1973 (age 53)

Cycling career
- Sport: Cycling
Medal record
Men's track cycling
Representing Argentina
World Championships
Silver medal – second place	2006 Bordeaux	Scratch
Silver medal – second place	2009 Pruszków	Scratch
Pan American Games
Silver medal – second place	2003 Santo Domingo	Team pursuit
Pan American Championships
Gold medal – first place	2004 Cojedes	Scratch
Gold medal – first place	2005 Mar del Plata	Scratch
Gold medal – first place	2008 Montevideo	Scratch
Silver medal – second place	2006 São Paulo	Scratch
Silver medal – second place	2009 Mexico City	Scratch
Bronze medal – third place	2008 Montevideo	Omnium
Bronze medal – third place	2009 Mexico City	Omnium
Bronze medal – third place	2011 Medellin	Scratch

Ángel Dario Colla Anacoreto (born 8 September 1973) is an Argentine former professional racing cyclist. He competed at the 1992 Summer Olympics and the 1996 Summer Olympics. In 2010 he was granted the Konex Award Merit Diploma as one of the five best cyclist of the last decade in Argentina.

== Career highlights ==
2000
1st, Stage 2, Doble San Francisco-Miramar
2001
1st, Stage 7 & 9, Vuelta de Chile
2nd, Stage 10, Vuelta de Chile
2002
1st, Stage 2 & 5, Vuelta de Chile
1st, Overall, Clásica del Oeste-Doble Bragado

1st, Stage 3

2003
1st, Prologue, Vuelta a San Juan
1st, Stage 1, 4 & 5B, Clásica del Oeste-Doble Bragado
(silver) in Pan American Games, Track, Team Pursuit, Santo Domingo (DOM)
2004
Argentina National Champion, Road race
2nd, National Championship, Track, Scratch
1st, Stage 4 & 6, Clásica del Oeste-Doble Bragado
1st, Stage 7. Vuelta Ciclista del Uruguay
2005
(gold) Pan American Championships, Track, Scratch
1st, Overall, Doble San Francisco-Miramar

1st, Stage 1 & 2

2006
(silver) World Championship, Track, Scratch
1st, Los Angeles, World Cup Classic, Track, Madison
1st, Prologue, Stage 2 & 5, Giro del Sol
1st, Stage 1, 4 & 5, Clásica del Oeste-Doble Bragado
1st, Stage 2, Doble San Francisco-Miramar
2007
1st, Stage 3, Vuelta a San Juan
1st, Stage 1, Tour de San Luis
1st, Overall, Clásica del Oeste-Doble Bragado

1st, Stage 1, 2 & 6B

1st, Aniversario 3 de Febrero
2008
1st, Stage 3 & 4, Vuelta a San Juan
3rd, Overall, Clásica del Oeste-Doble Bragado

1st, Prologue, Stage 4 & 7
