= Alexis Cabrera =

Argentine footballer

Personal information
- Full name: Alexis Sebastián Cabrera Coronas
- Date of birth: 18 March 1987 (age 39)
- Place of birth: Mar de Ajó, Argentina
- Position: Midfielder

Youth career
- Banfield
- Gimnasia LP
- Estudiantes LP
- Lanús

Senior career*
Years	Team	Apps	(Gls)
2005–2007	Lanús		
2008–2009	San Martín Mendoza	24	(1)
2009	Naval	11	(0)
2010	Deportes La Serena	1	(0)
2010–2011	Almagro	4	(1)
2012	Ferroviarios	4	(0)
2012–2013	Defensores Unidos	1	(0)
2013	Atlético Policial	1	(0)
2014	Sportivo Rivadavia		
2014	Victoria		
2015	Sportivo Rivadavia		
2015	Atlético Sportivo	6	(0)
2016	San Miguel		
2016–2017	Camioneros		
2023–2024	Everton LP	8	(1)
- * Club domestic league appearances and goals as of 21 May 2024

Alexis Sebastián Cabrera Coronas (born 18 March 1987) is an Argentine footballer who plays as a midfielder.

== Teams ==
- (Argentina) Lanús 2005–2007
- (Argentina) San Martín de Mendoza 2008–2009
- (Chile) Deportes Naval 2009
- (Chile) Deportes La Serena 2010
- (Argentina) Almagro 2011–2012
- (Ecuador) Ferroviarios 2012-2013
- (Argentina) Sportivo Rivadavia 2014
