= Ezequiel Lázaro =

Argentine footballer

Personal information
- Full name: Ezequiel Alejandro Lázaro
- Date of birth: 4 December 1981 (age 44)
- Place of birth: Córdoba, Argentina
- Height: 1.70 m (5 ft 7 in)
- Position: Midfielder

Senior career*
Years	Team	Apps	(Gls)
2003–2006	Talleres	68	(6)
2006–2007	Atlético Rafaela	33	(3)
2008–2011	Instituto	63	(7)
2010	→ Chacarita Juniors (loan)	10	(1)
2011	→ Ñublense (loan)	9	(0)
2011	Independiente Rivadavia	6	(0)
2012	Alumni	8	(1)
2012–2013	General Paz Juniors	8	(2)
2013–2014	Mitre	13	(0)
2016	9 de Julio RT	–	(–)
- * Club domestic league appearances and goals

Ezequiel Alejandro Lázaro (born 4 December 1981) is an Argentine former footballer who played as a midfielder.

== Teams ==
- (Argentina) Talleres 2003–2006
- (Argentina) Atlético Rafaela 2006–2007
- (Argentina) Instituto 2008–2010
- (Argentina) Chacarita Juniors 2010
- (Chile) Ñublense 2011
- (Argentina) Independiente Rivadavia 2011
- (Argentina) Alumni de Villa María 2012
- (Argentina) General Paz Juniors 2012–2013
- (Argentina) Mitre 2013–2014
- (Argentina) 9 de Julio de Río Tercero 2016

== Personal life ==
Ezequiel is the father of Jeremías Lázaro, a footballer from the Instituto youth system.
