= Franco Cángele =

Argentine footballer (born 1984)

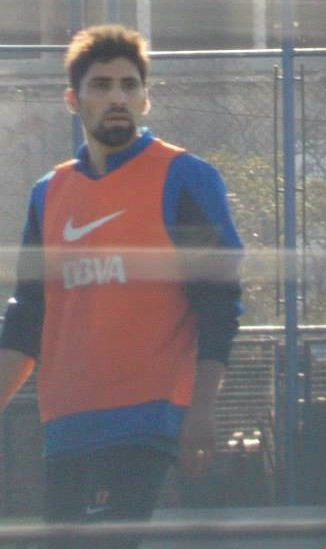

Personal information
- Full name: Franco Dario Cángele
- Date of birth: July 16, 1984 (age 42)
- Place of birth: Buenos Aires, Argentina
- Height: 1.80 m (5 ft 11 in)
- Positions: Forward; attacking midfielder

Youth career
- Boca Juniors

Senior career*
Years	Team	Apps	(Gls)
2002–2004	Boca Juniors	36	(7)
2005	Independiente	11	(0)
2005–2007	Colón	30	(6)
2006–2007	→ Sakaryaspor	26	(7)
2007–2013	Kayserispor	82	(18)
2013–2014	Boca Juniors	6	(0)
2014–2015	Elazığspor	20	(2)
2016	Boca Unidos	18	(8)
2016	Argentinos Juniors	0	(0)
2016	Boca Unidos	14	(4)

International career
2003	Argentina U-20	-	(-)
- * Club domestic league appearances and goals

Franco Cángele (born 16 July 1984 in Francisco Madero, Buenos Aires) is an Argentine footballer, who played as a forward.

Cángele went through the Boca Juniors youth system to make his debut for the club in 2002, he played a total of 57 games for the club in all competitions, scoring 10 goals. Cángele won three trophies in his time at Boca; the Primera Division Argentina Apertura 2003, the Copa Libertadores 2003 and the Copa Sudamericana 2004.

In 2005 Cángele was transferred to Club Atlético Independiente and then later that year to Colón de Santa Fe. In 2006 and fellow Colón teammate Alejandro Capurro signed contracts with Sakaryaspor in Turkey.

In 2013 Cángele left Turkey for a personal problem, and after a few months training with the first team of Boca Juniors. He confirm the return to the first team this season. The day 27 of June 2013 Franco, in dialogue with Argentinian Radio La Red on Buenos Aires declare "I am a Boca Juniors player again. I just know about it," declare the midfield of 28 years. As well he added:"I can play as a winger or as a second striker," he predicted, excited for the chance to back to the first team of Boca Juniors.

== Honours ==
Season	Club	Title
2003	Boca Juniors	Primera Division Argentina
2003	Boca Juniors	Copa Libertadores
2004	Boca Juniors	Copa Sudamericana
2007	Kayserispor	Turkish Cup

== International career ==
He came to international attention playing for the Argentina Under-20 team in the 2003 FIFA World Youth Championship in which Argentina finished fourth overall.

== Honours ==
Kayserispor

- Turkish Cup (1): 2007–08
