= Franco Sanchírico =

Argentine footballer

Personal information
- Date of birth: January 21, 1984 (age 42)
- Place of birth: Córdoba, Argentina
- Height: 1.79 m (5 ft 10 in)
- Position: Defender

Team information
- Current team: Évian TGFC
- Number: 15

Senior career*
Years	Team	Apps	(Gls)
2003–2008	Instituto de Córdoba	77	(1)
2008–2010	Évian TGFC	11	(0)
2010–2015000	CD Masnou		
2011–	UD Cornellà		
- * Club domestic league appearances and goals

Franco Sanchírico (born January 21, 1984, in Córdoba) is an Argentine professional football player, who currently plays for UD Cornellà.

He played on the professional level in Primera División Argentina for Instituto Atlético Central Córdoba and for the Championnat National side Évian Thonon Gaillard FC.
