= Pablo Barzola =

Argentine football full back

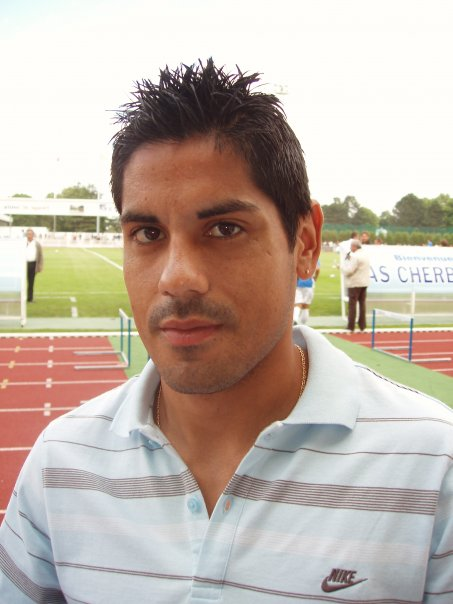

Personal information
- Full name: Pablo Maximiliano Barzola
- Date of birth: 17 November 1983 (age 42)
- Place of birth: San Martín, Argentina
- Height: 1.83 m (6 ft 0 in)
- Position: Left-back

Team information
- Current team: Fernando Cáceres FC

Senior career*
Years	Team	Apps	(Gls)
2001–2003	Argentinos Juniors	33	(0)
2004–2005	River Plate	9	(0)
2005–2006	Quilmes	35	(0)
2006–2008	Argentinos Juniors	66	(4)
2008–2011	SM Caen	71	(2)
2011–2015	Argentinos Juniors	67	(6)
2015	All Boys	15	(0)
2016–2017	Gimnasia y Tiro	15	(0)
2017–2018	Guaraní Antonio Franco	37	(0)
2019–	Fernando Cáceres FC	9	(0)

International career
2003	Argentina U-23	3	(0)
- * Club domestic league appearances and goals as of 22 March 2015

Pablo Maximiliano Barzola (born 17 November 1983 in San Martín) is an Argentine football full back, who plays for Fernando Cáceres FC.

== Career ==
Barzola started his professional career with Argentinos Juniors in 2001 in the Primera División Argentina, the club were relegated in 2002, but he stayed with them.

In 2003, Barzola was selected to play for Argentina in the Pan American Games.

In 2004, Barzola joined River Plate but never established himself as a regular in the first team. In 2005, he joined Quilmes before returning to Argentinos in 2006.

On 4 June 2008, Barzola signed with Stade Malherbe de Caen in French Ligue 1.
