= Doble Bragado =

Argentinian road cycling race

Race details
- Date: January–February
- Region: Buenos Aires Province, Argentina
- Discipline: Road

History
- First edition: 1922
- Editions: 84 (as of 2019)
- First winner: Eugenio Gret (ARG)
- Most wins: Cosme Saavedra (ARG) (6 wins)
- Most recent: Aníbal Borrajo (ARG)

The Clásica del Oeste-Doble Bragado is a road cycling race held in Argentina. The race exists as a men's competition over seven stages.

== Past winners ==
Year	Winner
1922	(Argentina) Eugenio Gret
1923	(Argentina) Eugenio Gret
1924	(Argentina) Cosme Saavedra
1925	(Argentina) Cosme Saavedra
1927	(Argentina) Cosme Saavedra
1928	(Argentina) Cosme Saavedra
1929	(Argentina) Cosme Saavedra
1930	(Argentina) Cosme Saavedra
1931	(Argentina) Francisco Rodríguez
1932	(Argentina) Remigio Saavedra
1933	(Argentina) Mario Stefani
1934	(Argentina) Remigio Saavedra
1935	(Argentina) Mario Mathieu
1936	(Argentina) Mario Mathieu
1937	(Argentina) José Gonzalez
1938	(Argentina) Mario Mathieu
1939	(Argentina) Mario Mathieu
1940	(Argentina) Mario Mathieu
1942	(Argentina) Mario Mathieu
1947	(Argentina) Oscar Giacche
1948	(Argentina) Miguel Sevillano
1949	(Argentina) Caferino Perone
1950	(Argentina) Oscar Muleiro
1951	(Argentina) Saúl Crispin
1952	(Italy) Dante Benvenuti
1953	(Argentina) Alfredo Figgini
1954	(Argentina) Humberto Varisco
1956	(Argentina) Rodolfo Caccavo
1957	(Argentina) Carlos Vásquez
1958	(Argentina) Ricardo Senn
1959	(Argentina) Duilio Biganzoli
1960	(Argentina) Carlos Vásquez
1961	(Argentina) Marcos Spaggiari
1964	(Argentina) Carlos Alvarez Seidanes
1965	(Argentina) Carlos Alvarez Seidanes
1966	(Argentina) Eduardo Sanchez
1967	(Argentina) Héctor Gomez
1968	(Argentina) Saul Alcantara
1969	(Argentina) Raul Gomez
1970	(Argentina) Rodolfo Tadeo
1971	(Argentina) Raul Gomez
1972	(Argentina) Ismael Torres
1973	(Argentina) Osvaldo Benvenutti
1974	(Argentina) Ricardo Jurado
1975	(Argentina) Oswaldo Frossasco
1980	(Argentina) Ricardo Jurado
1981	(Argentina) Omar Richeze
1982	(Argentina) Juan Ruarte
1983	not held
1984	(Argentina) Luis Moyano
1985	(Argentina) Carlos Bodei
1986	(Argentina) Armando Robledo
1987	(Argentina) Alejandro Carrusca
1988	(Argentina) Marcello Alexandre
1989	(Argentina) Jorge Sebastia
1990	(Argentina) Adrián García
1991	(Argentina) Marcello Alexandre
1992	(Argentina) Luis Biera
1993	(Argentina) Pablo Pérez
1994	(Argentina) Ruben Priede
1995	(Argentina) Rubén Pegorin
1996	(Argentina) Gustavo Artacho
1997	(Argentina) Juan Curuchet
1998	(Argentina) Juan Curuchet
1999	(Argentina) Walter Pérez
2000	(Argentina) Juan Curuchet
2001	(Argentina) Edgardo Simón
2002	(Argentina) Ángel Colla
2003	(Argentina) Juan Curuchet
2004	(Argentina) Alejandro González
2005	(Argentina) Pedro Prieto
2006	(Argentina) Matías Médici
2007	(Argentina) Ángel Colla
2008	(Argentina) Gerardo Fernández
2009	(Argentina) Daniel Díaz
2010	(Argentina) Román Mastrangelo
2011	(Argentina) Leandro Messineo
2012	(Argentina) Laureano Rosas
2013	(Argentina) Fernando Antogna
2014	(Argentina) Laureano Rosas
2015	(Argentina) Juan Melivilo
2016	(Argentina) Laureano Rosas
2017	(Argentina) Román Mastrángelo
2018	(Argentina) Fernando Antogna
2019	(Argentina) Aníbal Borrajo
