= Gustavo Eberto =

Argentine footballer

Personal information
- Full name: Gustavo Daniel Eberto
- Date of birth: August 30, 1983
- Place of birth: Paso de los Libres, Argentina
- Date of death: September 3, 2007 (aged 24)
- Height: 1.88 m (6 ft 2 in)
- Position: Goalkeeper

Youth career
- Boca Juniors

Senior career*
Years	Team	Apps	(Gls)
2003–2005	Boca Juniors	1	(0)
2006	Talleres de Córdoba	2	(0)
Total		3	(0)

International career
2003	Argentina U-20	14	(0)
- * Club domestic league appearances and goals

Gustavo Daniel Eberto (30 August 1983 – 3 September 2007) was an Argentine soccer goalkeeper, for the Club Atlético Boca Juniors. He played for the Argentina Under-20 team in the 2003 FIFA World Youth Championship.

Eberto died of testicular cancer in 2007 at the age of 24.

== Titles ==
Season	Team	Title
Apertura 2003	Boca Juniors	Primera División Argentina
