= Jonathan Bottinelli =

Argentine footballer (born 1984)

Personal information
- Full name: Jonathan Pablo Bottinelli
- Date of birth: 14 September 1984 (age 42)
- Place of birth: Buenos Aires, Argentina
- Height: 1.84 m (6 ft 0 in)
- Position: Centre-back

Youth career
- San Lorenzo

Senior career*
Years	Team	Apps	(Gls)
2002–2012	San Lorenzo	235	(14)
2008	→ Sampdoria	8	(0)
2012–2014	River Plate	33	(1)
2014	→ Universidad Católica (loan)	13	(0)
2014–2015	León	20	(2)
2016–2017	Arsenal Sarandí	41	(3)
2017–2020	Unión	68	(2)
2020–2021	Rosario Central	7	(0)
2021	Arsenal Sarandí	11	(0)
2022	San Martín SJ	34	(2)
Total		470	(24)

International career
2007–2011	Argentina	3	(0)
- * Club domestic league appearances and goals

Jonathan Pablo Bottinelli (born 14 September 1984) is an Argentine former professional footballer who played as a centre-back. He is the brother of fellow professional footballer Darío Bottinelli.

== Club career ==
=== San Lorenzo ===
In 2007, Bottinelli helped San Lorenzo to win the Clausura tournament. On 12 August 2008, Bottinelli moved to Sampdoria, on 15 January 2009 he returned to San Lorenzo.

=== River Plate ===
On 26 July 2012, River Plate's president Daniel Passarella reported that Bottinelli joined to the club for an approximate fee of US$2 million, and was presented days later during a press conference at the city of Ezeiza. On 21 August, the AFA investigated the player for irregularities in his rights as the Chilean Primera División club Unión San Felipe with bank accounts at Virgin Islands received exactly US$1.7 million while posing as the club owner of the player's rights according to information provided by La Tercera newspaper.

=== León ===
Bottinelli played for Club León in the 2014–15 Liga MX season.

== International career ==
Bottinelli made his debut for the Argentina national team in a 0–0 draw against Chile on 18 April 2007.

== Honours ==
San Lorenzo

- Torneo de Clausura: 2007
