= Walter García =

Argentine footballer

Personal information
- Full name: Walter Ariel García
- Date of birth: March 14, 1984 (age 42)
- Place of birth: Buenos Aires, Argentina
- Height: 6 ft 0 in (1.83 m)
- Positions: Defender; midfielder

Youth career
- Argentinos Juniors

Senior career*
Years	Team	Apps	(Gls)
2001–2003	Argentinos Juniors	21	(0)
2004–2006	San Lorenzo	61	(3)
2006–2008	Rubin Kazan	3	(0)
2006	→ Catania (loan)	5	(0)
2007–2008	→ Quilmes (loan)	21	(0)
2008	Nacional	2	(0)
2009	New York Red Bulls	1	(0)
2010–2011	Juventud Antoniana		
2011–2012	Guillermo Brown	33	(3)
2012–2015	Independiente Rivadavia	82	(9)
2015–2017	Los Andes	62	(3)
2017	CD Olimpia	16	(2)
2017–2018	Deportivo Maipú	22	(3)
2018–2019	All Boys	16	(1)
- * Club domestic league appearances and goals

Walter Ariel García (born March 14, 1984) is an Argentine former footballer.

== Career ==
=== Club ===
García started his career with Argentinos Juniors in 2001, but in 2002 the club was relegated to the Argentine 2nd division. After staying with the club for a further season he returned to the Primera with Club Atlético San Lorenzo de Almagro one of the top five clubs (cinco grandes) in Argentine football. García was a key player for San Lorenzo anchoring the clubs back line, appearing in 61 league matches. He also participated in the 2004 Copa Sudamericana in which he started all 4 matches and the 2005 Copa Libertadores for San Lorenzo appearing in 4 matches and scoring one goal. His play did not go unnoticed as he began to receive interest from various European clubs. Sevilla FC were interested in acquiring García on loan, however this offer was rejected by San Lorenzo who accepted an offer of $2 million from FC Rubin Kazan for his transfer.

In February 2006, García joined FC Rubin Kazan on a four-year contract, before joining Catania on a one-year loan deal in September of the same year. Returning to Argentina to play for Quilmes in 2007. After being relegated with his team García stayed with Quilmes to play in the 2007-08 Primera B Nacional season. Following his stay with Quilmes, García joined Nacional in Uruguay. After not featuring for the club he received interest from various clubs including Club América of Mexico and Deportivo Quito of Ecuador. He signed with New York Red Bulls in August 2009.

He left Red Bulls at the end of 2009 season, having played just 1 game for the team, and had a trial at English side Leeds United with hopes of securing a contract at the club in the January 2010 transfer window. Leeds manager Simon Grayson decided that after Garcia played for Leeds in a behind closed doors friendly in which Leeds conceded 4 goals that Garcia was no better than any of the centre backs currently at the club, and his trial was ended.

=== International ===
García represented Argentina at the 2001 FIFA U-17 World Championship. He was also capped for the Argentina Under-20 side in the 2003 FIFA World Youth Championship and the 2003 South American Youth Championship which was won by the Argentine team.
