= Vuelta a San Juan =

Race details
- Date: January
- Region: San Juan, Argentina
- English name: Tour of San Juan
- Local name: Vuelta a San Juan (in Spanish)
- Discipline: Road
- Type: Stage race
- Web site: vueltaasanjuan.org

History
- First edition: 1982
- Editions: 39 (as of 2023)
- First winner: Eduardo Trillini (ARG)
- Most wins: Laureano Rosas (ARG); Alberto Bravo (ARG) (3 wins each)
- Most recent: Miguel Ángel López (COL)

The Vuelta a San Juan is an annual road cycling stage race held in Argentine. Typically consisting of seven stages, beginning and ending in San Juan, the race was first held in 1982. In 2017, the race was classified as a 2.1 event by the Union Cycliste Internationale (UCI), and expanded to included international, professional teams.

Taking place in January, the race was viewed as a useful event for UCI WorldTour cyclists to get racing experience early in the season, before the start of the European season. It was called "the most prestigious competition in Latin America" by the Pan American Cycling Confederation.

In 2020, the race was promoted to the UCI ProSeries and given a 2.Pro status. The race was cancelled in 2021 and 2022 due to the COVID-19 pandemic. Following the 2023 edition, the race was removed from the UCI calendar. Since 2025, the race has continued as a local competition, unaffiliated with the UCI.

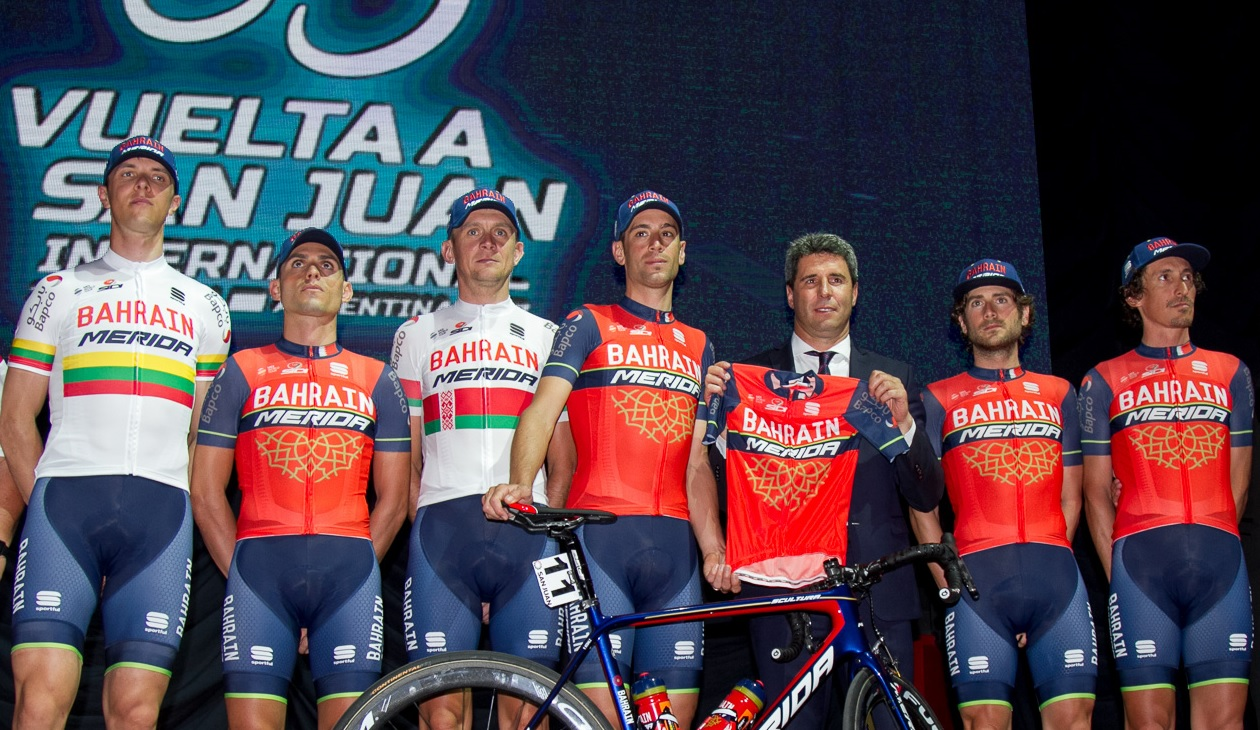
The Bahrain Merida team at the start of the 2017 Vuelta a San Juan

== Past winners ==
Year	Country	Rider	Team
1982	Argentina	Eduardo Trillini	
1983	Chile	Víctor Caro	
1984	Argentina	Pedro Chirino	
1985	Argentina	Ramón Sánchez	
1986	Argentina	Ramón Sánchez	
1987	Argentina	Daniel Castro	
1988	Argentina	Luis Moyano	
1989	Argentina	Alberto Bravo	
1990	Argentina	Javier Argonz	
1991	Argentina	Alberto Bravo	
1992	Argentina	Alberto Bravo	
1993	Argentina	Juan Agüero	
1994	Argentina	Juan Agüero	
1995	Argentina	David Kenig	
1996	Argentina	Raúl Ruarte	
1997	Argentina	Eduardo Mulet	
1998	Argentina	Gonzalo Rosas	
1999	Argentina	Gustavo Toledo	
2000	No race		
2001	Argentina	Edgardo Simón	
2002	Argentina	Edgardo Simón	
2003	Argentina	Oscar Villalobo	
2004	Argentina	Oscar Villalobo	
2005	Argentina	Luciano Montivero	
2006	Argentina	Gerardo Fernández	
2007	Argentina	Luciano Montivero	
2008	Argentina	Pedro González	
2009	Argentina	Gerardo Fernández	
2010	Argentina	Juan Pablo Dotti	
2011	Argentina	Daniel Zamora	
2012	Argentina	Juan Pablo Dotti	
2013	Argentina	Daniel Zamora	
2014	Argentina	Laureano Rosas	Sindicato Empleados Públicos
2015	Argentina	Laureano Rosas	Sindicato de Empleados Publicos de San Juan
2016	Argentina	Laureano Rosas	Sindicato de Empleados Publicos de San Juan
2017	Netherlands	Bauke Mollema	Trek–Segafredo
2018	Spain	Óscar Sevilla (Note: Gonzalo Najar originally won the race, but he tested positive for the EPO-based blood booster CERA and was stripped of his results. Subsequently, Sevilla, who finished second, was awarded the win.)	Medellín
2019	Colombia	Winner Anacona	Movistar Team
2020	Belgium	Remco Evenepoel	Deceuninck–Quick-Step
2021	No race due to COVID-19 pandemic		
2022	No race due to COVID-19 pandemic		
2023	Colombia	Miguel Ángel López	Team Medellín–EPM
2026	Chile	Cristóbal Baeza	Plus Performance–ZEO Sport

=== Wins per country ===
Wins	Country
33	Argentina
2	Colombia; Chile
1	Belgium; Netherlands; Spain
