= Flávio Cardoso =

Brazilian bicycle racer (born 1980)

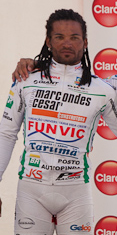

Personal information
- Full name: Flávio Cardoso Santos
- Born: October 12, 1980 (age 46) Itagi, Brazil

Cycling career
- Sport: Cycling
- Current team: UniFunvic–Pindamonhangaba
- Discipline: Road
- Role: Rider

Amateur teams
- 2009: Fapi–Sundown–JKS–Pindamonhangaba
- 2018–: Funvic/Soul Brasil Pro Cycling

Professional team
- 2010–2017: Funvic–Pindamonhangaba

Major wins
- National Road Race Championships (2009, 2016)

Flávio Cardoso Santos (born October 12, 1980 in Itagi) is a Brazilian cyclist, who currently rides for Brazilian amateur team UniFunvic–Pindamonhangaba.

== Major results ==
2008
10th Prova Ciclística 9 de Julho
2009
1st Road race, National Road Championships
2nd Overall Volta Ciclística Internacional do Rio Grande do Sul
2010
6th Overall Giro do Interior de São Paulo
7th Overall Tour do Brasil

1st Stage 3

2011
Giro do Interior de São Paulo

1st Stages 1 & 2

2nd Overall Tour do Brasil

1st Stage 3

2012
2nd Overall Tour do Brasil
3rd Time trial, National Road Championships
2013
1st Points classification Tour do Rio
7th Overall Vuelta a Guatemala
2014
1st Stage 1 Tour do Brasil
2015
3rd Overall Vuelta del Uruguay
5th Copa América de Ciclismo
7th Overall Volta do Paraná

1st Stage 3

2016
1st Road race, National Road Championships
2017
3rd Overall Vuelta del Uruguay

1st Stage 3b (TTT)

2018
3rd Time trial, National Road Championships
5th Overall Vuelta del Uruguay

1st Stage 2a (TTT)
