= Ramiro Cabrera =

Uruguayan cyclist

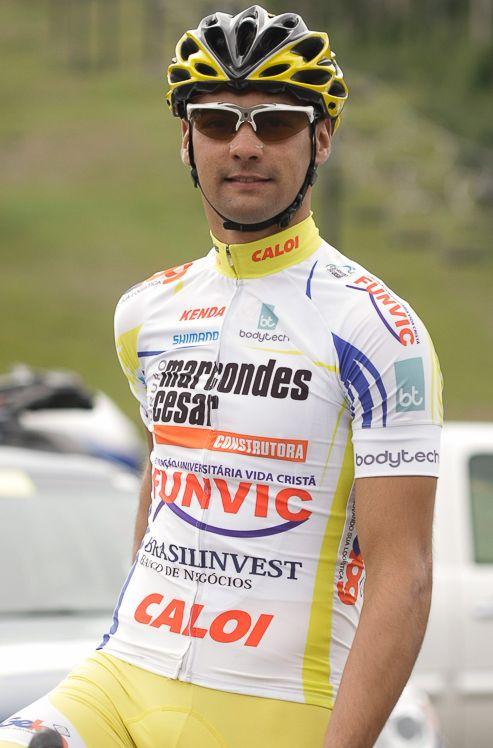
- Cabrera at the 2013 Tour of Utah

Personal information
- Full name: Ramiro Cabrera González
- Born: 8 February 1988 (age 38) Tacuarembó, Uruguay

Cycling career
- Sport: Cycling
- Current team: Retired
- Discipline: Road
- Role: Rider

Amateur teams
- 2015–2016: DataRo Brazil
- 2017: Libre Uruguay
- 2018–2019: Club Juvenil de Rivera

Professional teams
- 2011–2012: Movistar Continental Team
- 2013: Funvic Brasilinvest–São José dos Campos
- 2014: Clube DataRo de Ciclismo–Bottecchia

Ramiro Cabrera González (born 8 February 1988 in Tacuarembó) is a Uruguayan former professional cyclist.

== Major results ==
2008
1st Stage 1 Rutas de América
3rd Overall Vuelta del Uruguay
3rd Road race, Pan American Road Championships Montevideo Uruguay
2009
1st Overall Volta Ciclistica Internacional de Gravataí

1st Stage 1

2nd Overall Rutas de América
1st Overall
2010
National Under-23 Road Championships

2nd Road race
3rd Time trial

3rd Overall Vuelta del Uruguay
4th Overall Rutas de América
10th Time trial, Pan American Road Championships
2012
9th Overall Vuelta del Uruguay
2015
Volta do Paraná

1st Stages 4 & 5

10th Overall Vuelta del Uruguay
2016
6th Overall Vuelta del Uruguay
