= Geovane Fernández =

Uruguayan cyclist

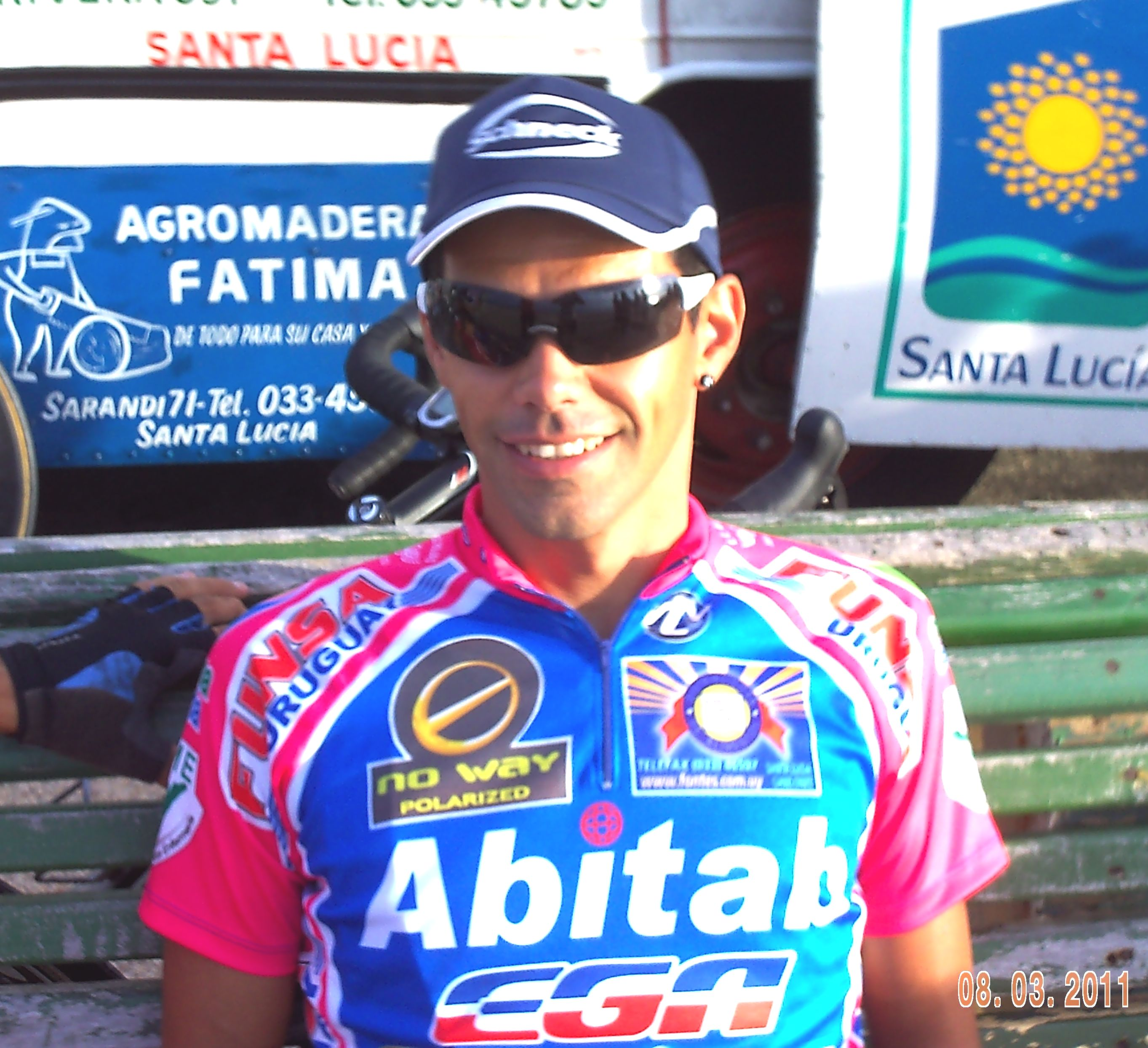

Personal information
- Full name: Vagner Giovani Fernández
- Born: July 21, 1982 (age 44) Río Branco, Uruguay

Cycling career
- Sport: Cycling
- Discipline: Road
- Role: Rider

Amateur teams
- 2001–2002: U.C. de Treinta y Tres
- 2002–2004: Cruz del Sur
- 2004–2007: CC Amenecer
- 2007–2012: Alas Rojas de Santa Lucía
- 2012–2019: CC Cerro Largo

Vagner Giovani "Geovane" Fernández (born July 21, 1982, in Río Branco, Uruguay) is a Uruguayan racing cyclist. In 2015, Fernández won the Uruguayan National Road Race Championships.

== Major results ==
2003
1st Overall Volta Ciclistica de Porto Alegre

1st Stage 3

2005
9th Overall Vuelta del Uruguay
2006
3rd Overall Vuelta al Chana
7th Overall Vuelta Ciclista de Chile
2007
1st Suarez
2008
Vuelta al Chana

1st Stages 1 & 2

2nd Overall Rutas del Este

1st Stage 2

3rd Overall Día de las Americas
2009
7th Overall Rutas de América
2010
8th Overall Vuelta del Uruguay
2015
1st Road race, National Road Championships
