= Fino (surname) =

Fino is a surname. Notable people with the surname include:

- Anna Fino, Italian mathematician
- Bashkim Fino (1962–2021), Albanian politician, the 29th Prime Minister of Albania
- Gabriel Fino Noriega (1966/67-2009), Honduras journalist
- Paul A. Fino (1913–2009), American lawyer and politician

== See also ==
- Mariano De Fino (born 1983), Uruguayan cyclist riding for Salto Nuevo
- Fino (disambiguation)
