= Ricardo Guedes =

Uruguayan cyclist

Personal information
- Full name: Ricardo Guedes Moseque
- Born: 2 November 1972 (age 53)

Cycling career
- Sport: Cycling
- Discipline: Road
- Role: Rider

Ricardo Guedes Moseque (born 2 November 1972) is a Uruguayan cyclist. He competed in the men's individual road race at the 1996 Summer Olympics. In 2015 and 2016, Guedes finished in second place at the Uruguayan National Road Race Championships.

== Major results ==
1996
1st Stage 6 Rutas de America
2002
1st Stage 7 Rutas de America
2005
6th Overall Vuelta del Uruguay
2009
2nd Overall Vuelta del Uruguay
2015
2nd Road race, National Road Championships
2016
2nd Road race, National Road Championships
