= Nicolás Arachichú =

Uruguayan cyclist

Personal information
- Full name: Nicolás Arachichú de Armas
- Born: 6 July 1986 (age 40) Uruguay

Cycling career
- Sport: Cycling
- Current team: CC Ciudad del Plata
- Discipline: Road
- Role: Rider

Amateur teams
- 2014: Brou Flores
- 2015: CC Fénix
- 2016–2017: Schneck Alas Rojas
- 2017: Audax Flores
- 2018–2021: CC Cerro Largo
- 2022: CC Ciudad del Plata

Nicolás Arachichú de Armas (born 6 July 1986) is a Uruguayan cyclist, who last rode for CC Ciudad del Plata.

== Major results ==
2013
1st National Road Race Championships
1st Stage 7a Rutas de America
2014
1st Stage 1 Vuelta del Uruguay
2016
1st National Road Race Championships
1st Stages 3a (TTT) and 4 Vuelta del Uruguay
