= Jorge Bravo =

Uruguayan cyclist

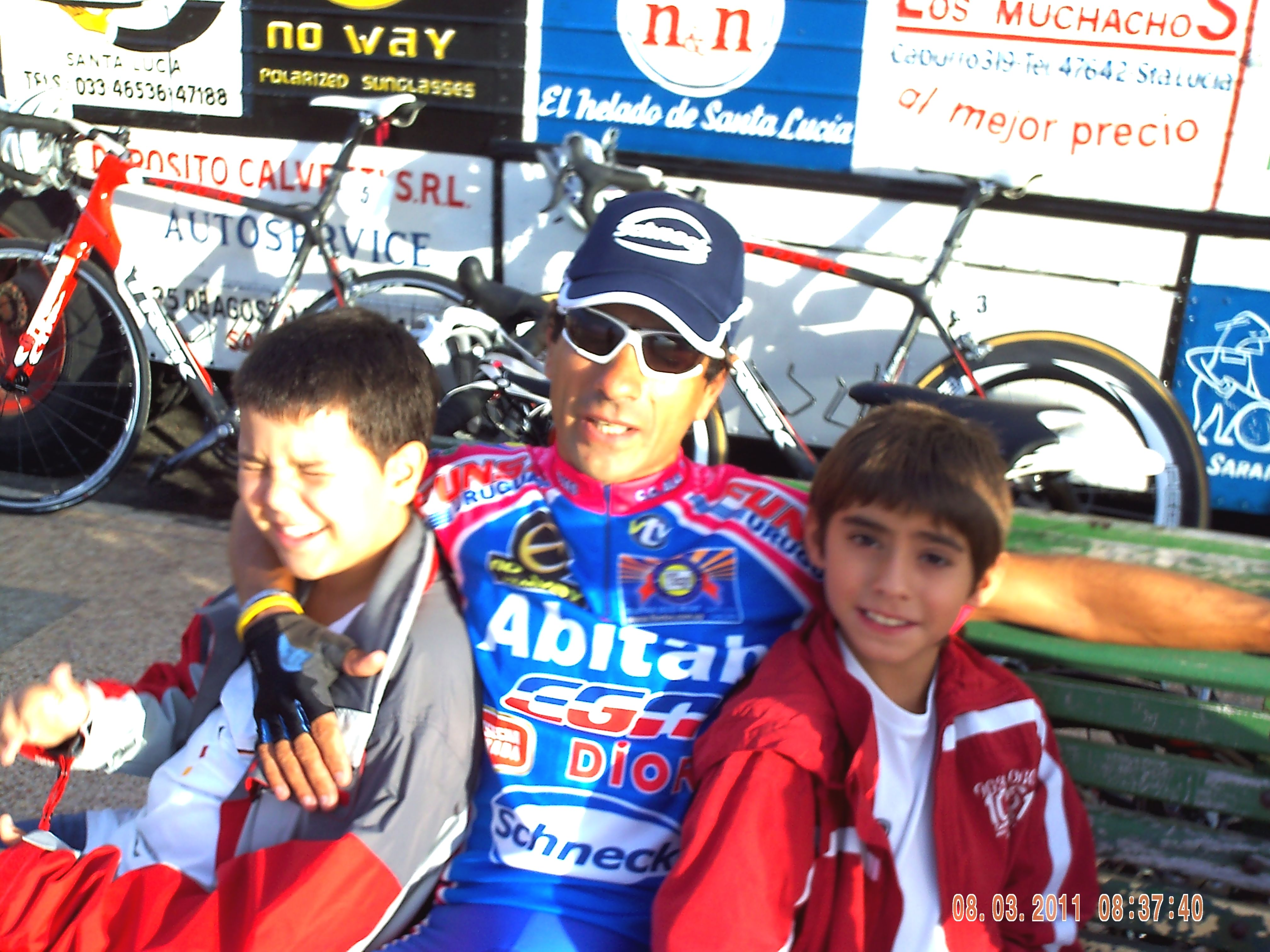

Personal information
- Full name: Jorge Raúl Bravo Orona
- Born: November 28, 1967 (age 58) Trinidad, Uruguay

Cycling career
- Sport: Cycling
- Discipline: Road
- Role: Rider

Amateur teams
- 1986: Porongos
- 1987–1996: Belo Horizonte
- 1997–1998: Alas Rojas
- 2000: San Antonio de Florida
- 2001: Amanecer
- 2002: Peñarol
- 2003: Tabaré Farías
- 2004–2005: Villa Teresa
- 2006–2007: Cruz del Sur
- 2008–2009: Olímpico Juvenil
- 2010–2017: Schneck–Alas Rojas
- 2017: Audax de Flores
- 2018: San Antonio de Florida
- 2019-2020: Federación de Treinta y Tres

Jorge Raúl Bravo Orona (born 28 November 1967 in Trinidad, Uruguay) is a Uruguayan cyclist.

== Major results ==
1995
1st Stage 1b (TTT) Vuelta del Uruguay
2002
2nd Overall Rutas de América
2003
6th Overall Vuelta del Uruguay

1st Stage 9

2004
7th Overall Vuelta del Uruguay
2005
8th Overall Vuelta del Uruguay
2007
1st Overall Vuelta del Uruguay

1st Stage 6b

2nd Overall Rutas de América
8th Overall Volta de Ciclismo Internacional do Estado de São Paulo
2008
6th Road race, Pan American Road Championships
2009
1st Stage 6 Rutas de América
2010
2nd Road race, National Road Championships
6th Overall Rutas de América
6th Overall Vuelta del Uruguay
2011
3rd Overall Rutas de América
2014
1st Stage 2b (TTT) Vuelta del Uruguay
2015
3rd Time trial, National Road Championships
2016
7th Overall Volta Ciclística Internacional do Rio Grande do Sul
9th Overall Vuelta del Uruguay

1st Stage 3a (TTT)
