= Fino (disambiguation) =

Fino is a dry sherry variety.

Fino or FINO may also refer to:

- Fino (surname)
- FINO, "First In Never Out", a humorous scheduling algorithm
- Fino bread, an Egyptian bread roll
- FINO, Bolivian brand of oils and spreads from Industrias de Aceite
- LG L Fino, smartphone/phablet by LG Electronics
- Yamaha Fino, a Yamaha scooter
- Fino (river), river in eastern central Italy
