= Agustín Moreira (cyclist) =

Uruguayan cyclist

Personal information
- Full name: Federico Agustín Moreira Guarino
- Born: 23 July 1993 (age 33)

Cycling career
- Sport: Cycling
- Current team: CC Cerro Largo
- Discipline: Road
- Role: Rider

Amateur teams
- 2012: Villa Teresa
- 2013: Reyno de Navarra–WRC–Makor
- 2013–2014: Brou Flores
- 2015: Estudiantes El Colla
- 2016: CC Fenix
- 2017–: CC Cerro Largo

Major wins
- National Time Trial Championships (2016, 2017)

Federico Agustín Moreira Guarino (born 23 July 1993) is a Uruguayan cyclist, who currently rides for Uruguayan amateur team CC Cerro Largo. His brother Mauricio Moreira is also a cyclist.

== Major results ==
2012
1st Time trial, National Under-23 Road Championships
3rd Time trial, National Road Championships
2014
1st Time trial, National Under-23 Road Championships
3rd Time trial, National Road Championships
2015
1st Time trial, National Under-23 Road Championships
9th Overall Vuelta del Uruguay

1st Young rider classification

2016
1st Time trial, National Road Championships
2017
1st Time trial, National Road Championships
9th Time trial, Pan American Road Championships
2018
1st Overall Vuelta Ciclista Chaná

1st Stages 2 & 3

2nd Time trial, National Road Championships
3rd Overall Vuelta del Uruguay
9th Time trial, Pan American Road Championships
2019
2nd Overall Rutas de América

1st Stage 6b (ITT)

7th Overall Vuelta del Uruguay
2020
1st Overall Rutas de América

1st Stage 3

1st Overall Vuelta Ciclista Chaná

1st Stages 1, 2a & 3

2022
1st Stages 4, 5 & 9 Vuelta del Uruguay
1st Stage 2a Vuelta Ciclista Chaná
2nd Overall Rutas de América

1st Stage 5

3rd Time trial, National Road Championships
2023
1st Overall Fiesta del Pueblo de Treinta y Tres

1st Stage 1

2nd Overall Vuelta Ciclista Chaná

1st Stage 2b (ITT)

2nd Time trial, National Road Championships
