= 2011 Tour de San Luis =

Race details
- Dates: 17–23 January
- Stages: 7
- Distance: 1,026.8 km (638.0 mi)
- Winning time: 25h 51' 54"

Results
	Winner	Marco Arriagada (CHI)	(Chile national Team)
	Second	José Serpa (COL)	(Androni Giocattoli)
	Third	Josue Moyano (ARG)	(Team Argentina)
	Mountains	Antonio Piedra (ESP)	(Andalucía–Caja Granada)
	Young rider	Josue Moyano (ARG)	(Team Argentina)
	Sprints	Luis Mansilla (CHI)	(Team Chile)
	Team	Team Argentina	

The 2011 Tour de San Luis is the 5th edition of the stage race Tour de San Luis. It forms part of the 2010–11 UCI America Tour.

The tour was won by Marco Arriagada riding for the Chile national team. The previous edition was won by Vincenzo Nibali, from Liquigas–Doimo, who came ahead of José Serpa, from Androni Giocattoli.

== Teams ==
Twenty-one teams are invited to the 2011 Tour de San Luis.

=== UCI ProTeams ===
- Liquigas–Cannondale
- Ag2r–La Mondiale
- Movistar Team

=== Professional Continental teams ===
- Androni Giocattoli
- Andalucía–Caja Granada
- De Rosa–Ceramica Flaminia
- UnitedHealthcare

=== Continental teams ===
- Endura Racing
- Trek–Livestrong
- Team Nutrixxion
- Team Boavista
- Funvic-Pindamonhangaba
- Centro della Calzatura
- D'Angelo & Antenucci

=== National teams ===
- Team Bolivia
- Team Brazil
- Team Argentina
- Team Colombia
- Team Chile
- Team Cuba
- Team Uruguay

== Schedule ==
Stage	Route	Distance	Date	Winner
1	San Luis (Argentina) > Justo Daract (Argentina)	170 km	Monday, January 17	Roberto Ferrari
2	Juana Koslay (Argentina) > Mirador del Portero (Argentina)	160 km	Tuesday, January 18	José Serpa
3	Buena Esperanza (Argentina) > Villa Mercedes (Argentina)	170 km	Wednesday, January 19	Roberto Ferrari
4 (ITT)	San Luis (Argentina) > San Luis (Argentina)	19.5 km	Thursday, January 20	Xavier Tondó
5	La Toma (Argentina) > Mirador de Merlo (Argentina)	170 km	Friday, January 21	Leandro Messineo
6	San Martín (Argentina) > La Carolina (Argentina)	140 km	Saturday, January 22	Miguel Ángel Rubiano
7	San Luis (Argentina) > San Luis (Argentina)	167 km	Sunday, January 23	Hector Aguilar

== Stages ==
=== Stage 1, San Luis to Justo Daract ===
Stage 1 result

	Rider	Team	Time
1	Roberto Ferrari (ITA)	Androni Giocattoli	4h 59' 30"
2	Maximiliano Richeze (ARG)	D'Angelo & Antenucci	+ 0"
3	Jacopo Guarnieri (ITA)	Liquigas–Cannondale	+ 0"
4	Jorge Soto (URU)	Uruguay – national team	+ 0"
5	Giorgio Brambilla (ITA)	De Rosa–Ceramica Flaminia	+ 0"

General Classification after Stage 1

	Rider	Team	Time
1	Roberto Ferrari (ITA)	Androni Giocattoli	4h 59' 20"
2	Maximiliano Richeze (ARG)	Argentina – national team	+ 4"
3	Jacopo Guarnieri (ITA)	Liquigas–Cannondale	+ 6"
4	Jorge Soto (URU)	Uruguay – national team	+ 10"
5	Giorgio Brambilla (ITA)	De Rosa–Ceramica Flaminia	+ 10"

=== Stage 2, Juana Koslay to Mirador del Portero ===
Stage 2 result

	Rider	Team	Time
1	José Serpa (COL)	Androni Giocattoli	3h 52' 58"
2	Eros Capecchi (ITA)	Liquigas–Cannondale	+ 0"
3	Marco Arriagada (CHI)	Chile – national team	+ 0"
4	Xavier Tondó (ESP)	Movistar Team	+ 0"
5	Josue Moyano (ARG)	Argentina – national team	+ 14"

General Classification after Stage 2

	Rider	Team	Time
1	José Serpa (COL)	Androni Giocattoli	8h 52' 18"
2	Eros Capecchi (ITA)	Liquigas–Cannondale	+ 4"
3	Xavier Tondó (ESP)	Movistar Team	+ 10"
4	Josue Moyano (ARG)	Argentina – national team	+ 24"
5	Jorge Giacinti (ARG)	Argentina – national team	+ 36"

=== Stage 3, Buena Esperanza to Villa Mercedes ===
Stage 3 result

	Rider	Team	Time
1	Roberto Ferrari (ITA)	Androni Giocattoli	3h 19' 49"
2	Marco Crespo (ARG)	Funvic–Pindamonhangaba	+ 0"
3	Maximiliano Richeze (ARG)	D'Angelo & Antenucci	+ 0"
4	Hector Aguilar (URU)	Funvic–Pindamonhangaba	+ 0"
5	Sebastien Hinault (FRA)	Ag2r–La Mondiale	+ 0"

General Classification after Stage 3

	Rider	Team	Time
1	José Serpa (COL)	Androni Giocattoli	12h 12' 07"
2	Eros Capecchi (ITA)	Liquigas–Cannondale	+ 4"
3	Xavier Tondó (ESP)	Movistar Team	+ 10"
4	Josue Moyano (ARG)	Argentina – national team	+ 24"
5	Jorge Giacinti (ARG)	Argentina – national team	+ 36"

=== Stage 4, San Luis to San Luis (ITT) ===
Stage 4 result

	Rider	Team	Time
1	Xavier Tondó (ESP)	Movistar Team	23' 23"
2	Jorge Giacinti (ARG)	Argentina – national team	+ 8"
3	Scott Zwizanski (USA)	United Healthcare	+ 15"
4	Juan Arango (COL)	Colombia – national team	+ 23"
5	Marco Arriagada (CHI)	Chile – national team	+ 23"

General Classification after Stage 4

	Rider	Team	Time
1	Xavier Tondó (ESP)	Movistar Team	12h 35' 40"
2	José Serpa (COL)	Androni Giocattoli	+ 30"
3	Jorge Giacinti (ARG)	Argentina – national team	+ 34"
4	Marco Arriagada (CHI)	Chile – national team	+ 59"
5	Eros Capecchi (ITA)	Liquigas–Cannondale	+ 1' 14"

=== Stage 5, La Toma to Mirador de Merlo ===
Stage 5 result

	Rider	Team	Time
1	Leandro Messineo (ARG)	Argentina – national team	4h 04' 44"
2	Cristiano Salerno (ITA)	Liquigas–Cannondale	+ 22"
3	Adrián Palomaresi (ESP)	Andalucía–Caja Granada	+ 35"
4	Alexander Wetterhall (SWE)	Endura Racing	+ 41"
5	Marco Arriagada (CHI)	Chile – national team	+ 57"

General Classification after Stage 5

	Rider	Team	Time
1	Xavier Tondó (ESP)	Movistar Team	16h 41' 43"
2	José Serpa (COL)	Androni Giocattoli	+ 34"
3	Marco Arriagada (CHI)	Chile – national team	+ 37"
4	Eros Capecchi (ITA)	Liquigas–Cannondale	+ 1' 28"
5	Josue Moyano (ARG)	Argentina – national team	+ 1' 52"

=== Stage 6, Estancia Grande to La Carolina ===
Stage 6 result

	Rider	Team	Time
1	Miguel Ángel Rubiano (COL)	Andalucía–Caja Granada	5h 22' 14"
2	Antonio Piedra (ESP)	Androni Giocattoli	+ 1' 29"
3	Marco Arriagada (CHI)	Chile – national team	+ 1' 29"
4	Josué Moyano (ARG)	Argentina – national team	+ 2' 01"
5	Gonzalo Garrido (CHI)	Chile – national team	+ 2' 01"

General Classification after Stage 6

	Rider	Team	Time
1	Marco Arriagada (CHI)	Chile – national team	22h 05' 59"
2	José Serpa (COL)	Androni Giocattoli	+ 38"
3	Josué Moyano (ARG)	Argentina – national team	+ 1' 49"
4	Eros Capecchi (ITA)	Liquigas–Cannondale	+ 1' 50"
5	Miguel Ángel Rubiano (COL)	Andalucía–Caja Granada	+ 2' 42"

=== Stage 7, San Luis to San Luis ===
Stage 7 result

	Rider	Team	Time
1	Hector Aguilar (URU)	Funvic–Pindamonhangaba	3h 45' 55"
2	Marco Crespo (ARG)	Funvic–Pindamonhangaba	+ 0"
3	Maximiliano Richeze (ARG)	Argentina – national team	+ 0"
4	Bernardo Riccio (ITA)	D'Angelo & Antenucci	+ 0"
5	Roberto Ferrari (ITA)	Androni Giocattoli	+ 0"

Final Classification

	Rider	Team	Time
1	Marco Arriagada (CHI)	Chile – national team	25h 51' 54"
2	José Serpa (COL)	Androni Giocattoli	+ 38"
3	Josué Moyano (ARG)	Argentina – national team	+ 1' 49"
4	Eros Capecchi (ITA)	Liquigas–Cannondale	+ 1' 50"
5	Miguel Ángel Rubiano (COL)	Andalucía–Caja Granada	+ 2' 42"
