= Richard Mascarañas =

Uruguayan cyclist

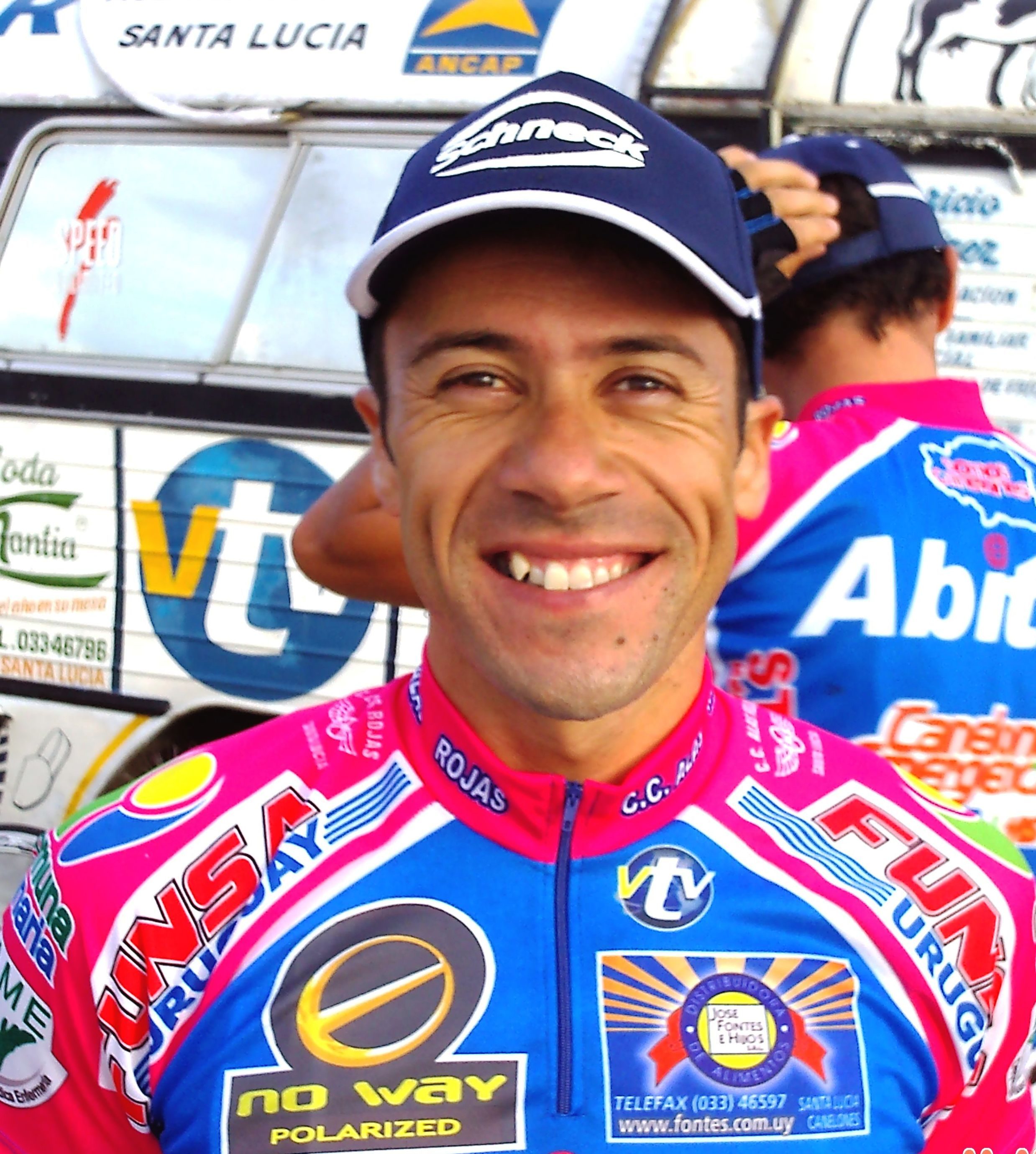
- Mascarañas in 2011

Personal information
- Full name: Richard Eustaquio Mascarañas Granada
- Born: 14 September 1979 (age 47) Tacuarembó, Uruguay

Cycling career
- Sport: Cycling
- Discipline: Road
- Role: Rider

Amateur teams
- 1999–2001: Cruz del Sur
- 2002–2017: Alas Rojas de Santa Lucía
- 2017–2018: San Antonio de Florida
- 2019: Tacuarembó
- 2020–2021: CC Cerro Largo
Medal record
Men's road bicycle racing
Representing Uruguay
Pan American Championships
Gold medal – first place	2008 Montevideo	Road race

Richard Eustaquio Mascarañas Granada (born 14 September 1979 in Tacuarembó) is a Uruguayan cyclist, who last rode for Uruguayan amateur team CC Cerro Largo.

== Major results ==
2003
1st Stage 4 Rutas de América
8th Overall Vuelta del Uruguay
2004
4th Overall Vuelta del Uruguay

1st Stage 4

2006
1st Stage 5 Vuelta del Uruguay
2007
3rd Overall Rutas de América

1st Stage 2

3rd Overall Vuelta del Uruguay

1st Stage 3

2008
1st Road race, Pan American Road Championships
1st Overall Vuelta del Uruguay

1st Stage 8

2009
1st Stage 1 Rutas de América
National Road Championships

2nd Road race
3rd Time trial

3rd Overall Vuelta del Uruguay

1st Stage 9

7th Copa América de Ciclismo
2010
1st Overall Vuelta del Uruguay

1st Stages 1 & 2

3rd Time trial, National Road Championships
3rd Overall Rutas de América

1st Stage 3

2011
4th Overall Rutas de América
2012
2nd Time trial, National Road Championships
9th Overall Rutas de América
2013
1st Stage 2 Vuelta del Uruguay
2014
1st Stage 2b (TTT) Vuelta del Uruguay
2015
1st Stage 2 Rutas de América
8th Overall Vuelta del Uruguay
2016
1st Stage 4 Volta Ciclística Internacional do Rio Grande do Sul
National Road Championships

3rd Road race
3rd Time trial

3rd Overall Vuelta del Uruguay

1st Stages 2 & 3a (TTT)

2017
1st Road race, National Road Championships
8th Overall Vuelta del Uruguay
2018
7th Overall Vuelta del Uruguay
2019
2nd Road race, National Road Championships
9th Overall Vuelta del Uruguay
