= Jorge Soto (cyclist) =

Uruguayan cyclist

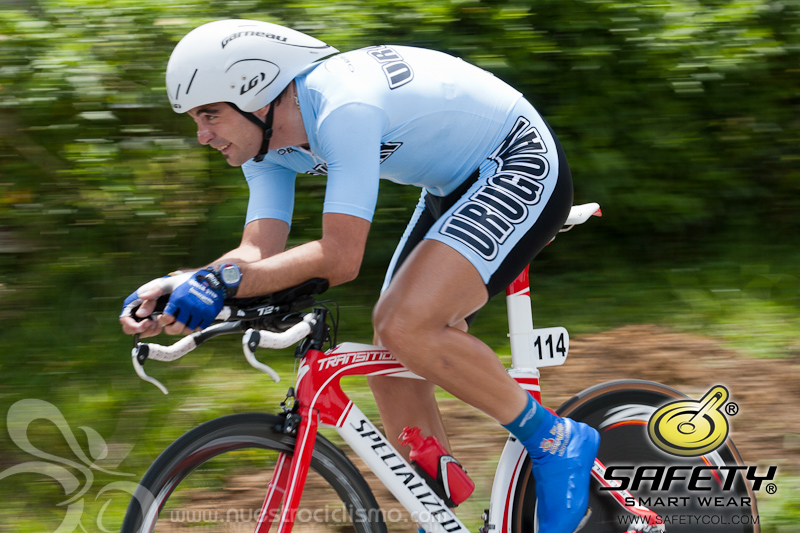
- Jorge Soto during the 2011 Pan American Road and Track Championship

Personal information
- Full name: Jorge Adelbio Soto Pereira
- Born: 8 August 1986 (age 40) Salto, Uruguay

Cycling career
- Sport: Cycling
- Disciplines: Road and track
- Role: Rider

Amateur teams
- 2004: Salto Nuevo
- 2005: Villa Teresa
- 2006: C.C. Fénix
- 2006–2007: Champagnat
- 2008–2010: Villa Teresa
- 2010–2012: Porongos
- 2014: Fénix
- 2015–2016: Club Social Amanecer
- 2018: Ciudad del Plata
- 2019: Avenida Artigas de Guichón
- 2021–2022: Ciudad del Plata
Medal record
Men's road bicycle racing
Representing Uruguay
Pan American Championships
Bronze medal – third place	2012 Mar del Plata	Time trial

Jorge Adelbio Soto Pereira (born 8 August 1986, in Salto, Uruguay) is a Uruguayan road bicycle racer and track cyclist.

He has won several stages of both Rutas de América as Vuelta Ciclista del Uruguay. In 2005, he received a grant for a month in Switzerland in the World Cycling Centre of the UCI to improve his performance, which ultimately became more than a year.

Soto represented Uruguay at the 2012 Summer Olympics in the Men's road race. He won the Rutas de América in 2011 and 2012.

== Major results ==
2005
1st Stage 3 Rutas de América
Pan American Under-23 Road Championships

2nd Road race
2nd Time trial

2008
1st Stage 5 Vuelta del Uruguay
10th Time trial, Pan American Road Championships
2009
6th Overall Vuelta del Uruguay

1st Stages 6 & 8

2010
1st Time trial, National Road Championships
3rd Overall Vuelta del Paraguay

1st Stage 1 (ITT)

9th Overall Rutas de América

1st Stage 4

2011
1st Overall Rutas de América

1st Stage 5b (ITT)

3rd Overall Vuelta del Uruguay
2012
1st Time trial, National Road Championships
1st Overall Rutas de América

1st Points classification
1st Mountains classification
1st Stage 2

4th Time trial, Pan American Road Championships
6th Copa América de Ciclismo
2013
1st Time trial, National Road Championships
2014
2nd Time trial, National Road Championships
10th Overall Vuelta del Uruguay

1st Stage 12

2015
1st Stage 4 Rutas de América
2019
1st Time trial, National Road Championships
2021
5th Road race, National Road Championships
2022
1st Stages 3 & 5 Vuelta del Uruguay
