= Uruguayan National Time Trial Championships =

National road cycling championship in Uruguay

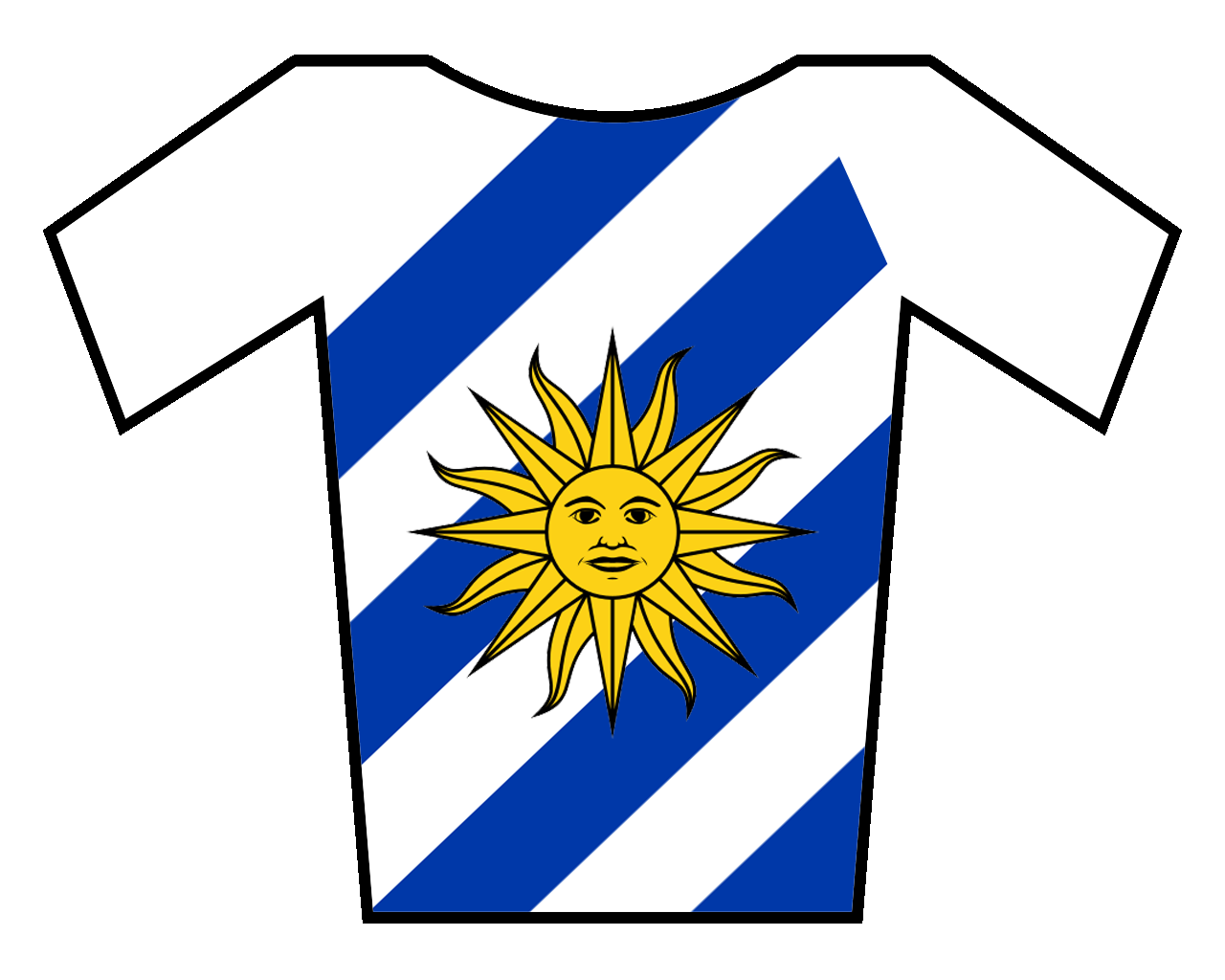
The champion's jersey

The Uruguayan National Time Trial Championships is a cycling race where the Uruguayan cyclists decide who will become the champion for the year to come.

== Men ==
=== Elite ===
| Year | Gold | Silver | Bronze |
| 2009 | Daniel Fuentes | Luis Martínez Ramírez | Richard Mascarañas |
| 2010 | Jorge Soto | Mariano De Fino | Richard Mascarañas |
| 2012 | Jorge Soto | Richard Mascarañas | Agustín Moreira |
| 2013 | Jorge Soto | Néstor Pías | Ignacio Maldonado |
| 2014 | Néstor Pías | Jorge Soto | Agustín Moreira |
| 2015 | Néstor Pías | Alan Presa | Jorge Bravo |
| 2016 | Agustín Moreira | Alan Presa | Richard Mascarañas |
| 2017 | Agustín Moreira | Sixto Núñez | Cristian Pérez |
| 2018 | Robert Méndez | Agustín Moreira | Juan Caorsi |
| 2019 | Jorge Soto | Nicolas Rariz | Pablo Troncoso |
| 2022 | Agustin Alonso | Roderyck Asconeguy | Agustín Moreira |
| 2023 | Eric Fagúndez | Agustín Moreira | Guillermo Thomas Silva |
| 2024 | Agustin Alonso | Antonio Fagundez | Guillermo Thomas Silva |
| 2025 | Antonio Fagundez | Guillermo Thomas Silva | Agustin Alonso |
| 2026 | Roderyck Asconeguy | Agustin Alonso | Guillermo Thomas Silva |

=== U23 ===
| Year | Gold | Silver | Bronze |
| 2010 | Roderyck Asconeguy | Ramiro Cabrera | Ignacio Maldonado |
| 2012 | Agustín Moreira | Sixto Nuñez | Enrique Peculio |
| 2013 | Camilo Pimentel | Diego Martin González | Sixto Nuñez |
| 2014 | Agustín Moreira | Sixto Nuñez | Carlos Cabrera |
| 2015 | Agustín Moreira | Pablo Troncoso | David Exequiel |
| 2016 | Mauricio Moreira | Pablo Troncoso | Diego Jamen |
| 2017 | Mauricio Moreira | Nahuel Soares | Martin Ansolabehere |
| 2018 | Eric Fagundez | Nahuel Alarcon | Hernan Silvera |
| 2019 | Agustin Alonso | Nahuel Hernandez | Juan Martin Echeverria |
| 2022 | Ivo Weickert | Juan Carlos Labeque | Carlos Sebastian Caraballo |
| 2023 | Guillermo Thomas Silva | Pablo Bonilla | Mateo Nahuel Mascarañas |

=== Junior ===
| Year | Gold | Silver | Bronze |
| 2012 | Mauricio Moreira | Diego González Suárez | Wayner Gadea |
| 2013 | Luis Olivera | Mauricio Moreira | Edy Corujo |
| 2014 | Frederico Rivero | Santiago Vanolli | Mauricio Chineppe |
| 2015 | Cristian Orellano | | |
| 2016 | Jean Pierre Bordenave | Douglas Castro | Alfredo Larraura |
| 2019 | Thomas Silva | Dante Gomez | Juan Labeque |
| 2022 | Pablo Bonilla | Thomas Alexander Lucas | Facundo José Revetria |
| 2023 | Ciro Pérez | Felipe Emanuel Reyes | Martin Falini |

== Women ==
=== Elite ===
| Year | Gold | Silver | Bronze |
| 2022 | Fabiana Granizal | Mariana Garcia | Natalia Beatriz Guedes |
| 2023 | Mariana Garcia | Johanna Bracco | Vikla Yenniers Lopez |
| 2025 | Anabel Posse | Mariana Garcia | Luciana Wynants |
| 2026 | Florencia Revetria | Mariana Garcia | Paola Silva |

=== Under 23 ===
| Year | Gold | Silver | Bronze |
| 2022 | Paola Silva | Luciana Wynants | Serena Santana |
| 2023 | Luciana Wynants | Natalia Gabriela Silva | Serena Santana |

== See also ==
- Uruguayan National Road Race Championships
- National Road Cycling Championships
