= Hernán Cline =

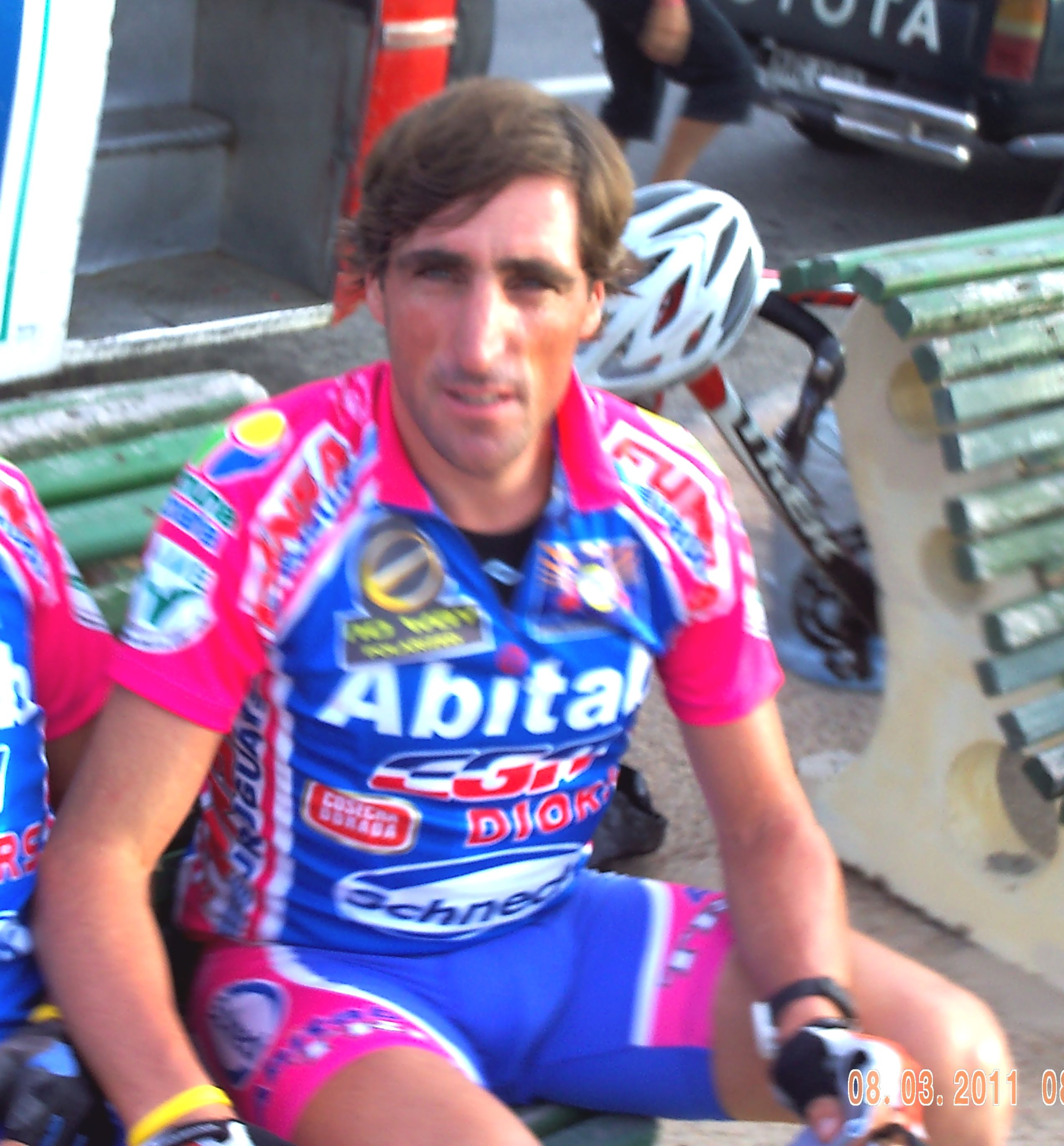

Personal information
- Full name: Hernán Jorge Cline Raffaelli
- Born: 3 September 1975 (age 51) Berisso, Argentina

Cycling career
- Sport: Cycling
- Current team: Retired
- Discipline: Road
- Role: Rider

Amateur teams
- 1996–1998: Cruz del Sur
- 1999–2001: Nacional
- 2002–2012: Alas Rojas

Hernán Jorge Cline Raffaelli (born 3 September 1975) is a Uruguayan former road cyclist. He held Argentine citizenship until 2002.

== Major results ==
2003
1st Overall Vuelta a los Puentes
1st Stage 2 Vuelta del Uruguay
4th Overall Rutas de América

1st Stage 1

2004
4th Overall Rutas de América
2005
1st Overall Doble Treinta y Tres

1st Stages 1 & 2

1st Stage 10 Vuelta del Uruguay
2006
3rd Overall Vuelta del Uruguay

1st Stage 2

2009
1st Overall Rutas de América
1st Stage 5 Vuelta Chaná
2010
1st Overall Rutas de América
1st Overall Doble Treinta y Tres

1st Stages 1 & 2

1st Overall Vuelta Chaná

1st Stage 3

1st Stage 5 Doble Bragado
2nd Overall Vuelta del Uruguay
