= Carlos Alcántara =

Carlos Alcántara may refer to:

- Carlos Alcántara (actor) (born 1964), Peruvian stand-up comedian and actor
- Carlos Alcántara (cyclist) (born 1948), Uruguayan cyclist
- Carlos Alcántara (footballer) (born 1985), Spanish footballer
