= 2017 Volta a Catalunya =

Cycling race

2017 UCI World Tour, race 9 of 37

Race details
- Dates: 20–26 March 2017
- Stages: 7
- Distance: 1,055 km (655.5 mi)
- Winning time: 25h 27' 15"

Results
Jersey awarded to the overall winner	Winner	Alejandro Valverde (ESP)	(Movistar Team)
	Second	Alberto Contador (ESP)	(Trek–Segafredo)
	Third	Marc Soler (ESP)	(Movistar Team)
Jersey awarded to the mountains classification winner	Mountains	Alejandro Valverde (ESP)	(Movistar Team)
Jersey awarded to the youth classification winner	Youth	Marc Soler (ESP)	(Movistar Team)
Jersey awarded to the sprints classification winner	Sprints	Pierre Rolland (FRA)	(Cannondale–Drapac)
	Team	Movistar Team	

The 2017 Volta a Catalunya was a road cycling stage race that took place between 20 and 26 March. It was the 97th edition of the Volta a Catalunya and the ninth event of the 2017 UCI World Tour.

The race was won for the second time by Movistar Team rider Alejandro Valverde, who – like all of his teammates received a one-minute time penalty in the team time trial stage of the race – won three stages, the mountains classification as well as the overall general classification. Valverde finished over a minute clear of his next closest competitor; Alberto Contador finished second for Trek–Segafredo, 63 seconds in arrears of Valverde. The podium was completed by Valverde's teammate Marc Soler – taking the young rider classification as a result – a further 13 seconds adrift of Contador. In the other classifications, the performances for Valverde and Soler were good enough for the Movistar Team to win the teams classification, while Cannondale–Drapac's Pierre Rolland won the intermediate sprints classification.

== Teams ==
As the Volta a Catalunya is a UCI World Tour event, all eighteen UCI WorldTeams were invited automatically and obliged to enter a team in the race. Seven UCI Professional Continental teams competed, completing the 25-team peloton. Two of the Professional Continental teams, Team Manzana Postobón and Soul Brasil Pro Cycling, made their début at UCI World Tour level.

UCI WorldTeams

- AG2R La Mondiale
- Astana
- Bahrain–Merida
- BMC Racing Team
- Bora–Hansgrohe
- Cannondale–Drapac
- Team Dimension Data
- FDJ
- Team Katusha–Alpecin
- LottoNL–Jumbo
- Lotto–Soudal
- Movistar Team
- Orica–Scott
- Quick-Step Floors
- Team Sky
- Team Sunweb
- Trek–Segafredo
- UAE Team Emirates

UCI Professional Continental teams

- Caja Rural–Seguros RGA
- CCC–Sprandi–Polkowice
- Cofidis
- Team Manzana Postobón
- Roompot–Nederlandse Loterij
- Soul Brasil Pro Cycling
- Wanty–Groupe Gobert

== Route ==
The full route of the 2017 Volta a Catalunya was announced on 9 March 2017. The race featured a team time trial for the first time since 2007, and its longest since 1964.

The fourth stage, initially scheduled to be run over 194.3 km (121 mi) and to start in Llívia, was shortened due to snow.

Stage schedule
Stage	Date	Route	Distance	Type	Winner
1	20 March	Calella to Calella	178.9 km (111 mi)	Medium-mountain stage	Davide Cimolai (ITA)
2	21 March	Banyoles to Banyoles	41.3 km (26 mi)	Team time trial	BMC Racing Team (Note: The Movistar Team initially won the stage, but were later penalised one minute for pushing during the stage.)
3	22 March	Mataró to La Molina	188.3 km (117 mi)	Mountain stage	Alejandro Valverde (ESP)
4	23 March	La Seu d'Urgell to Igualada	136.1 km (85 mi) (Note: Stage reduced from 194.3 km (121 mi) due to snow.)	Hilly stage	Nacer Bouhanni (FRA)
5	24 March	Valls to Lo Port	182 km (113 mi)	Mountain stage	Alejandro Valverde (ESP)
6	25 March	Tortosa to Reus	189.7 km (118 mi)	Medium-mountain stage	Daryl Impey (RSA)
7	26 March	Barcelona to Barcelona	138.7 km (86 mi)	Hilly stage	Alejandro Valverde (ESP)

== Stages ==
=== Stage 1 ===
20 March 2017 — Calella to Calella, 178.9 km (111 mi)

Result of Stage 1
Rank	Rider	Team	Time
1	Davide Cimolai (ITA)	FDJ	4h 28' 21"
2	Nacer Bouhanni (FRA)	Cofidis	+ 0"
3	Kristian Sbaragli (ITA)	Team Dimension Data	+ 0"
4	Dion Smith (NZL)	Wanty–Groupe Gobert	+ 0"
5	André Greipel (GER)	Lotto–Soudal	+ 0"
6	José Joaquín Rojas (ESP)	Movistar Team	+ 0"
7	Daryl Impey (RSA)	Orica–Scott	+ 0"
8	Petr Vakoč (CZE)	Quick-Step Floors	+ 0"
9	Phil Bauhaus (GER)	Team Sunweb	+ 0"
10	Enrico Gasparotto (ITA)	Bahrain–Merida	+ 0"

General classification after Stage 1
Rank	Rider	Team	Time
1	Davide Cimolai (ITA)	FDJ	4h 28' 11"
2	Nacer Bouhanni (FRA)	Cofidis	+ 4"
3	Kristian Sbaragli (ITA)	Team Dimension Data	+ 6"
4	Dion Smith (NZL)	Wanty–Groupe Gobert	+ 10"
5	André Greipel (GER)	Lotto–Soudal	+ 10"
6	José Joaquín Rojas (ESP)	Movistar Team	+ 10"
7	Daryl Impey (RSA)	Orica–Scott	+ 10"
8	Petr Vakoč (CZE)	Quick-Step Floors	+ 10"
9	Phil Bauhaus (GER)	Team Sunweb	+ 10"
10	Enrico Gasparotto (ITA)	Bahrain–Merida	+ 10"

=== Stage 2 ===
21 March 2017 — Banyoles to Banyoles, 41.3 km (26 mi), team time trial (TTT)

Result of Stage 2
Rank	Team	Time
1	BMC Racing Team	48' 57"
2	Team Sky	+ 44"
3	Movistar Team	+ 58"
4	Trek–Segafredo	+ 1' 13"
5	Orica–Scott	+ 1' 22"
6	FDJ	+ 1' 42"
7	LottoNL–Jumbo	+ 1' 46"
8	Astana	+ 2' 03"
9	Lotto–Soudal	+ 2' 08"
10	Quick-Step Floors	+ 2' 11"

General classification after Stage 2
Rank	Rider	Team	Time
1	Ben Hermans (BEL)	BMC Racing Team	5h 17' 18"
2	Brent Bookwalter (USA)	BMC Racing Team	+ 0"
3	Tejay van Garderen (USA)	BMC Racing Team	+ 0"
4	Rohan Dennis (AUS)	BMC Racing Team	+ 0"
5	Kilian Frankiny (SUI)	BMC Racing Team	+ 0"
6	Alessandro De Marchi (ITA)	BMC Racing Team	+ 0"
7	Samuel Sánchez (ESP)	BMC Racing Team	+ 0"
8	Geraint Thomas (GBR)	Team Sky	+ 44"
9	Peter Kennaugh (GBR)	Team Sky	+ 44"
10	Mikel Nieve (ESP)	Team Sky	+ 44"

=== Stage 3 ===
22 March 2017 — Mataró to La Molina, 188.3 km (117 mi)

Result of Stage 3
Rank	Rider	Team	Time
1	Alejandro Valverde (ESP)	Movistar Team	5h 07' 12"
2	Dan Martin (IRL)	Quick-Step Floors	+ 0"
3	Adam Yates (GBR)	Orica–Scott	+ 3"
4	Romain Bardet (FRA)	AG2R La Mondiale	+ 3"
5	Ilnur Zakarin (RUS)	Team Katusha–Alpecin	+ 3"
6	Geraint Thomas (GBR)	Team Sky	+ 3"
7	Alberto Contador (ESP)	Trek–Segafredo	+ 3"
8	Tejay van Garderen (USA)	BMC Racing Team	+ 3"
9	Michael Woods (CAN)	Cannondale–Drapac	+ 8"
10	Davide Formolo (ITA)	Cannondale–Drapac	+ 8"

General classification after Stage 3
Rank	Rider	Team	Time
1	Tejay van Garderen (USA)	BMC Racing Team	10h 24' 33"
2	Samuel Sánchez (ESP)	BMC Racing Team	+ 41"
3	Geraint Thomas (GBR)	Team Sky	+ 44"
4	Alejandro Valverde (ESP)	Movistar Team	+ 45"
5	Chris Froome (GBR)	Team Sky	+ 49"
6	Marc Soler (ESP)	Movistar Team	+ 1' 10"
7	Alberto Contador (ESP)	Trek–Segafredo	+ 1' 13"
8	Adam Yates (GBR)	Orica–Scott	+ 1' 18"
9	Bauke Mollema (NED)	Trek–Segafredo	+ 1' 25"
10	Jarlinson Pantano (COL)	Trek–Segafredo	+ 1' 25"

=== Stage 4 ===
23 March 2017 — La Seu d'Urgell to Igualada, 136.1 km (85 mi)

Result of Stage 4
Rank	Rider	Team	Time
1	Nacer Bouhanni (FRA)	Cofidis	3h 04' 27"
2	Davide Cimolai (ITA)	FDJ	+ 0"
3	Daryl Impey (RSA)	Orica–Scott	+ 0"
4	Alex Edmondson (AUS)	Orica–Scott	+ 0"
5	Dion Smith (NZL)	Wanty–Groupe Gobert	+ 0"
6	Pieter Serry (BEL)	Quick-Step Floors	+ 0"
7	Enrico Gasparotto (ITA)	Bahrain–Merida	+ 0"
8	Petr Vakoč (CZE)	Quick-Step Floors	+ 0"
9	José Joaquín Rojas (ESP)	Movistar Team	+ 0"
10	Bauke Mollema (NED)	Trek–Segafredo	+ 0"

General classification after Stage 4
Rank	Rider	Team	Time
1	Tejay van Garderen (USA)	BMC Racing Team	13h 29' 00"
2	Samuel Sánchez (ESP)	BMC Racing Team	+ 41"
3	Geraint Thomas (GBR)	Team Sky	+ 44"
4	Alejandro Valverde (ESP)	Movistar Team	+ 45"
5	Chris Froome (GBR)	Team Sky	+ 49"
6	Marc Soler (ESP)	Movistar Team	+ 1' 10"
7	Alberto Contador (ESP)	Trek–Segafredo	+ 1' 13"
8	Adam Yates (GBR)	Orica–Scott	+ 1' 18"
9	Bauke Mollema (NED)	Trek–Segafredo	+ 1' 25"
10	Jarlinson Pantano (COL)	Trek–Segafredo	+ 1' 25"

=== Stage 5 ===
24 March 2017 — Valls to Lo Port, 182 km (113 mi)

Result of Stage 5
Rank	Rider	Team	Time
1	Alejandro Valverde (ESP)	Movistar Team	4h 14' 52"
2	Chris Froome (GBR)	Team Sky	+ 13"
3	Alberto Contador (ESP)	Trek–Segafredo	+ 13"
4	Marc Soler (ESP)	Movistar Team	+ 25"
5	Adam Yates (GBR)	Orica–Scott	+ 32"
6	Dan Martin (IRL)	Quick-Step Floors	+ 46"
7	David Gaudu (FRA)	FDJ	+ 58"
8	Hugh Carthy (GBR)	Cannondale–Drapac	+ 1' 04"
9	Jakob Fuglsang (DEN)	Astana	+ 1' 11"
10	Steven Kruijswijk (NED)	LottoNL–Jumbo	+ 1' 11"

General classification after Stage 5
Rank	Rider	Team	Time
1	Alejandro Valverde (ESP)	Movistar Team	17h 44' 27"
2	Chris Froome (GBR)	Team Sky	+ 21"
3	Alberto Contador (ESP)	Trek–Segafredo	+ 47"
4	Marc Soler (ESP)	Movistar Team	+ 1' 00"
5	Adam Yates (GBR)	Orica–Scott	+ 1' 15"
6	Tejay van Garderen (USA)	BMC Racing Team	+ 1' 18"
7	Geraint Thomas (GBR)	Team Sky	+ 1' 34"
8	Samuel Sánchez (ESP)	BMC Racing Team	+ 1' 59"
9	Dan Martin (IRL)	Quick-Step Floors	+ 2' 13"
10	Steven Kruijswijk (NED)	LottoNL–Jumbo	+ 2' 40"

=== Stage 6 ===
25 March 2017 — Tortosa to Reus, 189.7 km (118 mi)

Result of Stage 6
Rank	Rider	Team	Time
1	Daryl Impey (RSA)	Orica–Scott	4h 34' 14"
2	Alejandro Valverde (ESP)	Movistar Team	+ 0"
3	Arthur Vichot (FRA)	FDJ	+ 0"
4	Petr Vakoč (CZE)	Quick-Step Floors	+ 0"
5	Alessandro De Marchi (ITA)	BMC Racing Team	+ 0"
6	Nick van der Lijke (NED)	Roompot–Nederlandse Loterij	+ 0"
7	Dario Cataldo (ITA)	Astana	+ 0"
8	Lennard Kämna (GER)	Team Sunweb	+ 0"
9	Cyril Gautier (FRA)	AG2R La Mondiale	+ 0"
10	Dan Martin (IRL)	Quick-Step Floors	+ 0"

General classification after Stage 6
Rank	Rider	Team	Time
1	Alejandro Valverde (ESP)	Movistar Team	22h 18' 35"
2	Alberto Contador (ESP)	Trek–Segafredo	+ 53"
3	Marc Soler (ESP)	Movistar Team	+ 1' 06"
4	Adam Yates (GBR)	Orica–Scott	+ 1' 21"
5	Tejay van Garderen (USA)	BMC Racing Team	+ 1' 24"
6	Dan Martin (IRL)	Quick-Step Floors	+ 2' 19"
7	Steven Kruijswijk (NED)	LottoNL–Jumbo	+ 2' 46"
8	Carlos Verona (ESP)	Orica–Scott	+ 2' 50"
9	George Bennett (NZL)	LottoNL–Jumbo	+ 2' 51"
10	Romain Bardet (FRA)	AG2R La Mondiale	+ 2' 55"

=== Stage 7 ===
26 March 2017 — Barcelona to Barcelona, 138.7 km (86 mi)

Result of Stage 7
Rank	Rider	Team	Time
1	Alejandro Valverde (ESP)	Movistar Team	3h 08' 50"
2	Jarlinson Pantano (COL)	Trek–Segafredo	+ 0"
3	Arthur Vichot (FRA)	FDJ	+ 0"
4	Rafał Majka (POL)	Bora–Hansgrohe	+ 0"
5	Dan Martin (IRL)	Quick-Step Floors	+ 0"
6	Aldemar Reyes (COL)	Team Manzana Postobón	+ 0"
7	Romain Bardet (FRA)	AG2R La Mondiale	+ 0"
8	Davide Formolo (ITA)	Cannondale–Drapac	+ 0"
9	George Bennett (NZL)	LottoNL–Jumbo	+ 0"
10	Steven Kruijswijk (NED)	LottoNL–Jumbo	+ 0"

Final general classification
Rank	Rider	Team	Time
1	Alejandro Valverde (ESP)	Movistar Team	25h 27' 15"
2	Alberto Contador (ESP)	Trek–Segafredo	+ 1' 03"
3	Marc Soler (ESP)	Movistar Team	+ 1' 16"
4	Adam Yates (GBR)	Orica–Scott	+ 1' 31"
5	Tejay van Garderen (USA)	BMC Racing Team	+ 1' 34"
6	Dan Martin (IRL)	Quick-Step Floors	+ 2' 29"
7	Steven Kruijswijk (NED)	LottoNL–Jumbo	+ 2' 56"
8	Carlos Verona (ESP)	Orica–Scott	+ 3' 00"
9	George Bennett (NZL)	LottoNL–Jumbo	+ 3' 01"
10	Romain Bardet (FRA)	AG2R La Mondiale	+ 3' 05"

== Classification leadership table ==
In the 2017 Volta a Catalunya, four different jerseys were awarded. The general classification was calculated by adding each cyclist's finishing times on each stage. Time bonuses were awarded to the first three finishers on all stages except for the team time trial: the stage winner won a ten-second bonus, with six and four seconds for the second and third riders respectively. Bonus seconds were also awarded to the first three riders at intermediate sprints; three seconds for the winner of the sprint, two seconds for the rider in second and one second for the rider in third. The leader of the general classification received a white and green jersey. This classification was considered the most important of the 2017 Volta a Catalunya, and the winner of the classification was considered the winner of the race.

Points for the mountains classification
Position	1	2	3	4	5	6	7	8	9	10	11	12
Points for Special	30	25	20	16	12	10	8	6	4	3	2	1
Points for Category 1	16	12	10	8	6	4	3	2	1	0		
Points for Category 2	10	7	5	3	2	1	0					
Points for Category 3	6	4	2	1	0							

The second classification was the sprints classification, the leader of which was awarded a white-and-black jersey. In the sprints classification, riders received points for finishing in the top three at intermediate sprint points during each stage. There was also a mountains classification, the leadership of which was marked by a red jersey. Points for this classification were won by the first riders to the top of each categorised climb, with more points available for the higher-categorised climbs.

The fourth jersey represented the young rider classification, marked by a white "design" jersey. Only riders born after 1 January 1992 were eligible; the young rider best placed in the general classification was the leader of the young rider classification. There was also a classification for teams, in which the times of the best three cyclists per team on each stage were added together; the leading team at the end of the race was the team with the lowest total time.

Stage	Winner	General classification	Mountains classification	Sprints classification	Young rider classification	Teams classification
1	Davide Cimolai	Davide Cimolai	Murilo Affonso	Murilo Affonso	Dion Smith	Quick-Step Floors
2	BMC Racing Team	Ben Hermans	Murilo Affonso	Murilo Affonso	Kilian Frankiny	BMC Racing Team
3	Alejandro Valverde	Tejay van Garderen	Murilo Affonso	Pascal Ackermann	Marc Soler	Team Sky
4	Nacer Bouhanni	Tejay van Garderen	Murilo Affonso	Diego Rubio	Marc Soler	Team Sky
5	Alejandro Valverde	Alejandro Valverde	Alejandro Valverde	Pierre Rolland	Marc Soler	Trek–Segafredo
6	Daryl Impey	Alejandro Valverde	Alejandro Valverde	Pierre Rolland	Marc Soler	Movistar Team
7	Alejandro Valverde	Alejandro Valverde	Alejandro Valverde	Pierre Rolland	Marc Soler	Movistar Team
Final		Alejandro Valverde	Alejandro Valverde	Pierre Rolland	Marc Soler	Movistar Team
