= Matías Presa =

Uruguayan cyclist

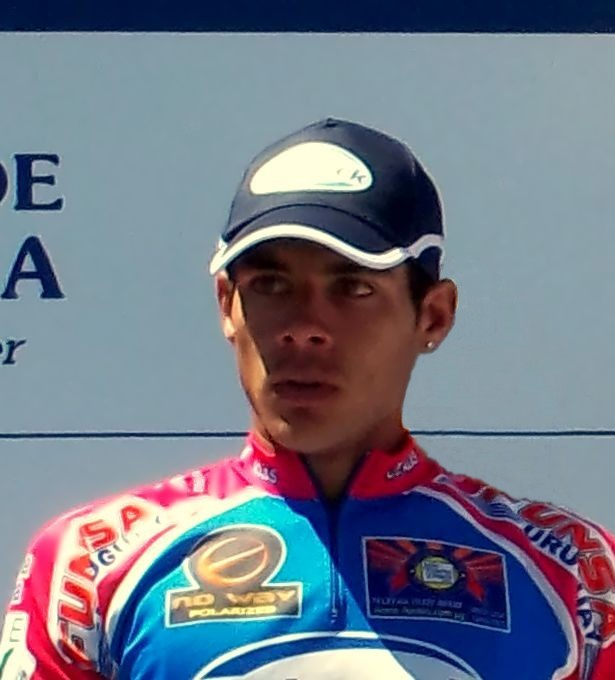
- Presa in 2012

Personal information
- Full name: Alan Matías Presa Pírez
- Born: 17 October 1990 (age 35) Melo, Uruguay

Cycling career
- Sport: Cycling
- Current team: CC Cerro Largo
- Discipline: Road
- Role: Rider

Amateur teams
- 2011: CC Cerro Largo
- 2012: Alas Rojas de Santa Lucía
- 2013–2014: Schneck–Alas Rojas
- 2015–2018: CC Cerro Largo
- 2017: Team Kuota-Construcciones Paulino
- 2017: Schneck–Alas Rojas
- 2019: Cortizo–Anova
- 2021–: CC Cerro Largo

Alan Matías Presa Pírez (born 17 October 1990) is a Uruguayan cyclist, who currently rides for Uruguayan amateur team CC Cerro Largo.

== Major results ==
2010
1st Road race, National Under-23 Road Championships
2012
1st Overall Vuelta Ciclista Chaná

1st Stages 2 & 3

2nd Overall Rutas de América

1st Young rider classification

1st Young rider classification, Vuelta del Uruguay
7th Time trial, Pan American Road Championships
2014
1st Overall Doble Melo-Treinta y Tres

1st Stages 1 (TTT) & 2

1st Stages 3 (TTT) & 11 Vuelta del Uruguay
2nd Overall Vuelta Ciclista Chaná

1st Stage 1

2nd Overall Rutas de América

1st Stage 5b (ITT)

National Road Championships

3rd Road race
4th Time trial

2015
2nd Overall Rutas de América

1st Points classification
1st Stage 7

7th Overall Vuelta del Uruguay

1st Points classification
1st Stages 5 & 10

2016
1st Stage 2 Rutas de América
1st Stage 2 Vuelta Ciclista Chaná
2nd Time trial, National Road Championships
7th Overall Vuelta del Uruguay
2017
1st Overall Vuelta Ciclista Chaná

1st Stage 4

1st Overall Doble Melo-Treinta y Tres

1st Stages 1 & 2 (TTT)

1st Vuelta a los Puentes del Santa Lucía
1st Stage 1 Grande Prémio Jornal de Notícias
1st Stage 2 Vuelta a La Coruña
2nd Road race, National Road Championships
2nd Overall Rutas de América

1st Stage 6

10th Overall Vuelta del Uruguay

1st Stage 1

10th Grand Prix Minsk
2018
1st Overall Rutas de América

1st Stages 2, 2 (ITT), 5 (ITT) & 7

1st Overall Doble Melo-Treinta y Tres

1st Stages 2 & 3 (TTT)

6th Overall Vuelta del Uruguay
2019
1st Overall Rutas de América

1st Stages 3 & 4

1st Overall Vuelta Ciclista Chaná

1st Stage 3

3rd Overall Doble Bragado

1st Stage 4

2023
1st Overall Rutas de América

1st Prologue & Stage 2

1st Stage 7 Vuelta del Uruguay
2025
1st Stage 3 Rutas de América
1st Stage 2 Vuelta Ciclista Chaná
