= Héctor Aguilar (cyclist) =

Uruguayan cyclist

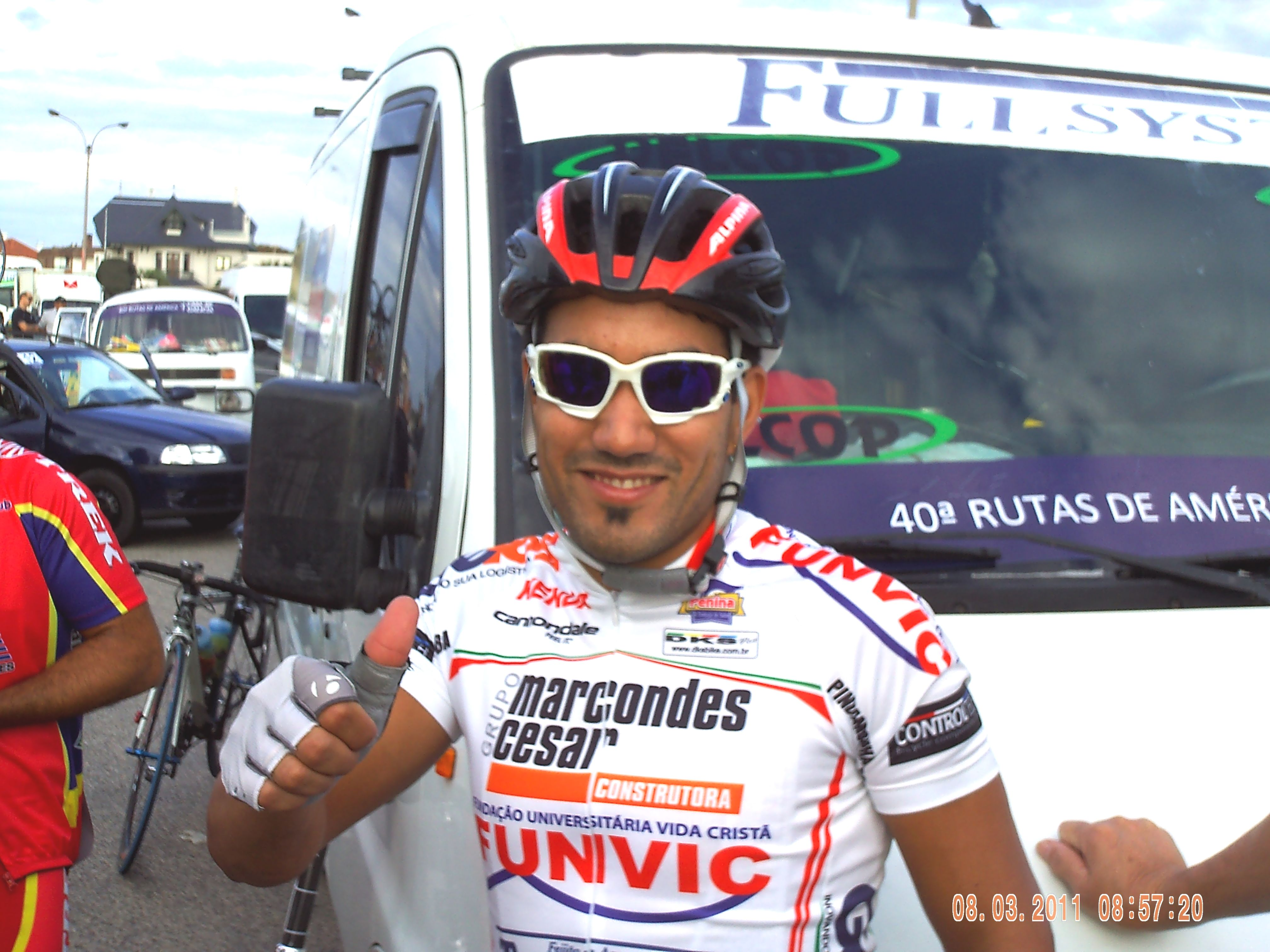
- Aguilar in 2011

Personal information
- Full name: Héctor Fabián Aguilar Figueras
- Born: 16 April 1984 (age 42) Maldonado, Uruguay

Cycling career
- Sport: Cycling
- Current team: Alas Rojas
- Discipline: Road
- Role: Rider

Amateur teams
- 2005–2006: CC Amenecer
- 2007: LA–Trevomar
- 2013: Porongos
- 2014: Brou Flores
- 2015–2017: Schneck Alas Rojas
- 2017: Amanecer
- 2018–2019: Tacuarembó
- 2023–2024: Alas Rojas

Professional teams
- 2008–2009: Fercase–Rota dos Móveis
- 2010–2012: Funvic–Pindamonhangaba
Medal record
Men's road bicycle racing
Representing Uruguay
Pan American Championships
| Bronze medal – third place | 2012 Mar del Plata | Road race |

Héctor Fabián Aguilar Figueras (born 16 April 1984 in Maldonado) is a Uruguayan cyclist, who is currently riding for Alas Rojas, after being suspended from the sport after testing positive for clenbuterol in 2019.

== Major results ==
2005
1st Stage 2 Rutas de América
1st Stage 9 Vuelta del Uruguay
2006
1st Stage 2 Rutas de América
Tour do Brasil

1st Points classification
1st Stages 1, 4 & 5

3rd Copa América de Ciclismo
2007
1st Stage 4a Vuelta del Uruguay
2009
Tour do Brasil

1st Stages 1 & 8

6th Prova Ciclística 9 de Julho
2010
Vuelta del Uruguay

1st Stages 6 & 7

1st Stage 2 Tour do Brasil
5th Prova Ciclística 9 de Julho
2011
1st Stage 7 Tour de San Luis
1st Stage 2 Vuelta Ciclista de Chile
1st Stage 6 Rutas de América
2012
1st Stage 1 Vuelta Mexico Telmex
1st Stage 3 Vuelta del Uruguay
2nd Prova Ciclística 9 de Julho
3rd Road race, Pan American Road Championships
2013
1st Stage 8 Rutas de América
Vuelta del Uruguay

1st Stages 4, 6 & 8

2014
1st Overall Rutas de América

1st Stage 6

2015
1st Stage 1 Rutas de América
1st Stage 7 Vuelta del Uruguay
2016
1st Overall Rutas de América

1st Stages 1, 5a & 6

Vuelta del Uruguay

1st Points classification
1st Stages 1, 3a (TTT), 3b & 6

2018
Vuelta del Uruguay

1st Stages 5 & 8b
