= Luis Sosa =

Luis Sosa may refer to:

- Luis Sosa (cyclist) (born 1949), Uruguayan cyclist
- Luis Sosa (gymnast) (born 1987), Mexican gymnast
- Luis Sosa (volleyball) (born 1995), Cuban volleyball player
