= Fabiana Granizal =

Uruguayan cyclist

Personal information
- Full name: Fabiana Andrea Granizal Martinez
- Born: 1 August 1987 (age 39) Rocha, Uruguay

Cycling career
- Sport: Cycling
- Discipline: Road
- Role: Rider

Amateur team
- 2019–2020: Belori Womens Team
Medal record
Women's road bicycle racing
Representing Uruguay
Pan American Championships
Bronze medal – third place	2022 San Juan	Road race

Fabiana Andrea Granizal Martinez (born 1 August 1987) is an Uruguayan racing cyclist. She rode in the women's road race event at the 2019 UCI Road World Championships.

== Major results ==
2006
4th Road Race, South American Games
2018
9th Road Race, Pan American Cycling Championships
2019
8th Road Race, Pan American Cycling Championships
2021
3rd National Road Race Championships
2022
1st National Time Trial Championships
2nd National Road Race Championships
3rd Road Race, Pan American Cycling Championships
