= Industrias de Aceite =

Bolivian consumer food and personal care products company

Industrias de Aceite S.A.
- Company type: Public
- Traded as: BBV: FIN
- Industry: Food & Beverages
- Founded: 1944
- Headquarters: Santa Cruz de la Sierra, Bolivia
- Area served: Bolivia
- Owner: Alicorp
- Website: Fino

Industrias de Aceite S.A., doing business as Alicorp Bolivia or FINO, is a Bolivian consumer food and personal care products company that specializes in food and cooking oils, particularly soybean-derived oils. It is a wholly owned international subsidiary of Alicorp. Industrias de Aceite is headquartered in Santa Cruz with a large plant located in Warnes. It also has a plant in Cochabamba. It is known for its FINO brand oils and spreads.

== History ==
The company was founded in 1944 in the city of Cochabamba. The FINO brand was introduced in 1954. Production in the Warnes plant began in 1977.

By 2013 vegetable oil production had increased to 2,500 metric tons (2,800 short tons) per day.

In 2018 it merged with ADM-SAO S.A., subsidiary of Archer Daniels Midland, and was acquired by Peruvian consumer goods company Alicorp S.A.A. for 292 million USD. The deal closed April 1, 2019.

== Products ==
The products of Industrias de Aceite include:

- Aceite Fino
- Aceite Fino Mental Activ
- Detergente UNO PRO
- Suavizante Uno Caricias
- Aceite Fino Light
- Jabon UNO
- Jabon AZO
- Jabon OSO
- Manteca Karina
- Manteca Gordito
- Margarina Regia
- Margarina Regia Light
- Primor

Distributed by FINO:

- Van Camp's
- Borges
- Plusbelle
- Don Vittorio
- Mimaskot
- Bolívar
- Nutregal
- Victoria
- Super
