= Uruguayan National Road Race Championships =

National road cycling championship in Uruguay

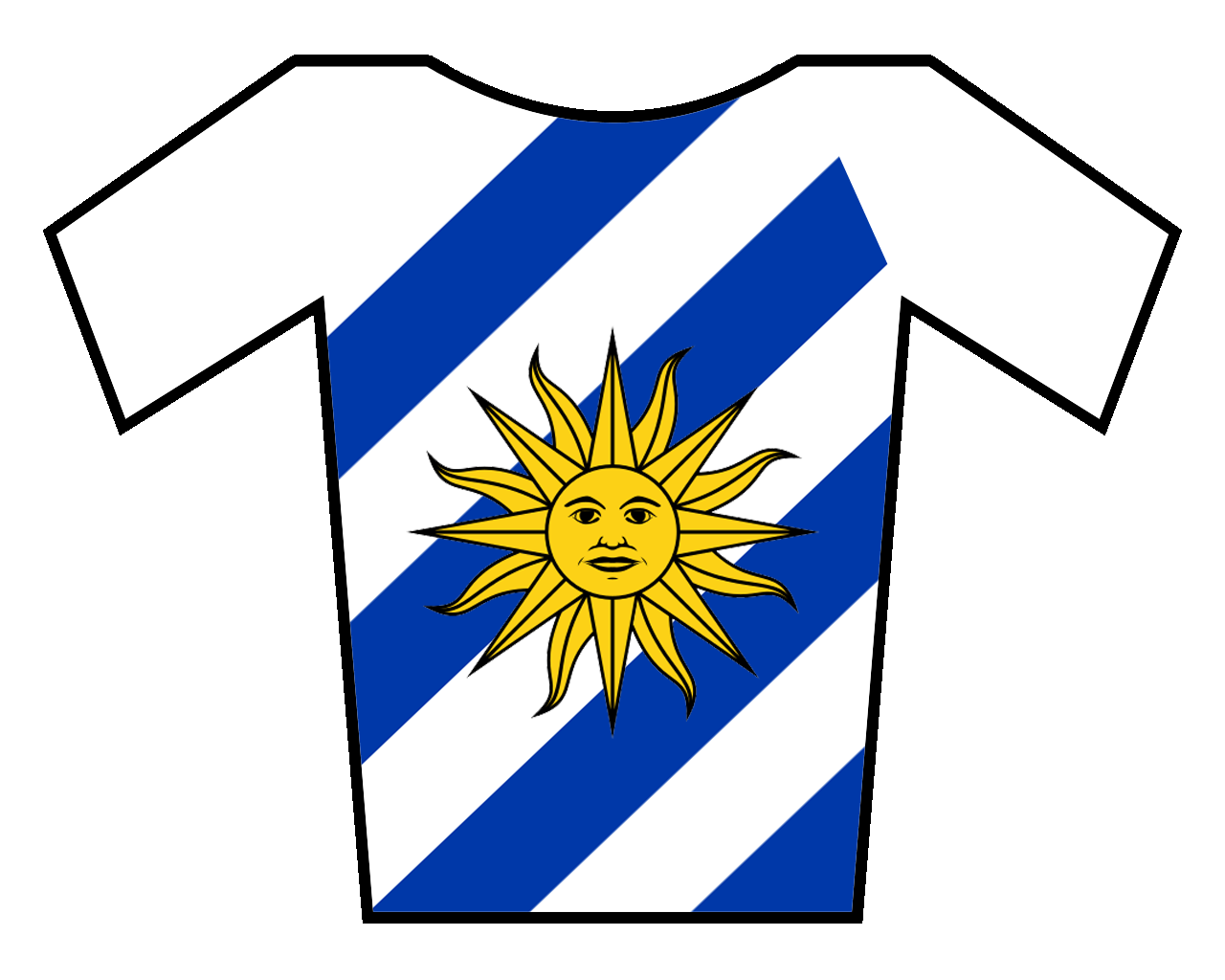
The champion's jersey

The Uruguayan National Road Race Championships is a cycling race where the Uruguayan cyclists decide who will become the champion for the year to come.

== Men ==
=== Elite ===
Year	Gold	Silver	Bronze
2007	Cristian Villanueva	Emanuel Machín	Néstor Aquino
2009	Néstor Aquino	Richard Mascarañas	Pablo Pintos Rodriguez
2010	Pablo Pintos Rodriguez	Jorge Bravo	Gregory Duarte
2012	Emanuel Machín	Alinton Gadea	Pablo Pintos Rodríguez
2013	Nicolás Arachichú	Néstor Pías	Joan De Souza
2014	Emanuel Yáñez	Diego González Suárez	Alan Presa
2015	Geovane Fernández	Ricardo Guedes	Matías Pérez
2016	Nicolás Arachichú	Ricardo Guedes	Richard Mascarañas
2017	Richard Mascarañas	Alan Presa	Ignacio Maldonado
2019	Pablo Anchieri	Richard Mascarañas	Santiago Nicolas Mendez
2021	Roderyck Asconeguy	Anderson Maldonado	Pablo Pintos Rodríguez
2022	Guillermo Thomas Silva	Ivo Weickert	Diego Leonel Rodríguez
2023	Diego Leonel Rodríguez	Fernando Augusto Mendez	Juan Martin Echevarria
2024	Guillermo Thomas Silva	Ignacio Maldonado	Ivo Weickert
2025	Diego Leonel Rodríguez	Antonio Fagundez	Roderyck Asconeguy
2026	Diego Leonel Rodríguez	Roderyck Asconeguy	Guillermo Thomas Silva

=== U23 ===
Year	Gold	Silver	Bronze
2010	Alan Presa	Ignacio Maldonado	Ramiro Cabrera
2012	Bilker Castro	Robert Hernández	Jorge Corujo
2013	Diego González Suárez	Rafael Ferrero	Robert Méndez
2014	Sixto Nuñez	Joaquín Hiriart	Anderson Maldonado
2015	Robert Méndez	Mauricio Moreira	Mauricio Santa Cruz
2016	Sandro Adrián Rodríguez		
2017	Cristian Gutiérrez	Alexander Gutiérrez	Luciano Flores
2019	Bruno Santa Cruz	Juan Martin Echeverria	Nahuel Hernandez
2021	Gabriel Ochoa	Ivan Pereira	Ivo Weickert
2022	Guillermo Thomas Silva	Ivo Weickert	Sebastián Caraballo
2023	Guillermo Thomas Silva	Lucas Piano	Bruno Joaquín Castro

=== Junior ===
Year	Gold	Silver	Bronze
2010	Carlos Cabrera	Matias Pombo	Sergio Saavedra
2012	José Larrosa	Nicolas Aveiro	Alexander Gutiérrez
2013	Mauricio Moreira	Nicolas Aveiro	Cristian Gutiérrez
2014	Mauricio Chineppe	Santiago Vanolli	Giovani Acosta
2015	Cristian Orellano		
2019	Thomas Silva	Dante Gomez	Ulises Carballo
2021	Ciro Perez	Pablo Bonilla	Franco Nahuel Seijas Rivero
2022	Ciro Pérez	Pablo Bonilla	Franco Seijas
2023	Ciro Pérez	Felipe Emanuel Reyes	Thomas Alexander Lucas

== Women ==
Year	Gold	Silver	Bronze
2021	Agustina Belen Fernandez	Florencia Giordano	Fabiana Granizal
2022	Ana Claudia Seijas	Fabiana Granizal	Paola Silva
2023	Johanna Bracco	Ana Claudia Seijas	Paola Silva
2025	Malvina Prieto	Paola Silva	Mariana Garcia
2026	Luciana Wynants	Paola Silva	Ana Claudia Seijas

== See also ==
- Uruguayan National Time Trial Championships
- National Road Cycling Championships
