= Antonio Piedra =

Spanish cyclist

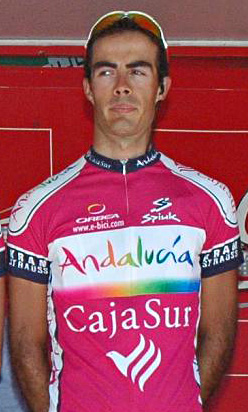
- Piedra in 2008

Personal information
- Full name: Antonio Piedra Pérez
- Born: 10 October 1985 (age 41) Seville, Spain
- Height: 1.78 m (5 ft 10 in)
- Weight: 61 kg (134 lb; 9.6 st)

Cycling career
- Sport: Cycling
- Current team: Retired
- Discipline: Road
- Role: Rider

Amateur teams
- 2002: Citroen Martos Tobalo (junior)
- 2003: UCOP (junior)
- 2004: Córdoba Patrimonio de la Humanidad
- 2005–2006: Comunitat Valenciana

Professional teams
- 2007: Fuerteventura–Canarias
- 2008–2011: Andalucía–Cajasur
- 2012–2014: Caja Rural
- 2016: Funvic Soul Cycles–Carrefour
- 2017: Team Manzana Postobón

Major wins
- Grand Tours Vuelta a España 1 individual stage (2012) One-day races and Classics Rogaland GP (2012)

Antonio Piedra Pérez (born 10 October 1985) is a Spanish former professional road bicycle racer, who rode professionally between 2007 and 2017 for the Fuerteventura–Canarias, Andalucía–Caja Granada, Caja Rural–Seguros RGA, Funvic Soul Cycles–Carrefour and Team Manzana Postobón squads.

== Career ==
Born in Seville, Piedra became a professional in 2007, competing for the Fuerteventura–Canarias team, before joining Andalucía–Cajasur in 2008. He spent four years with the team before joining the Caja Rural team for the 2012 season. Piedra took a prestigious victory by winning the Rogaland GP in May 2012, soloing away to win by 35 seconds over his nearest challenger. He participated in that year's Vuelta a España, his team being invited as a 'wildcard', and had a major victory on stage 15, a high mountain affair finishing atop the Lakes of Covadonga climb. Piedra followed a move that formed on the first climb of the day, and dropped his breakaway companions on the final difficulty of the race, the first "Hors Category" climb of the Vuelta. He had 2 minutes and 2 seconds of an advantage over his nearest competitor, Euskaltel–Euskadi's Rubén Pérez.

== Major results ==
2006
2nd Overall Vuelta a Segovia

1st Stage 3

3rd Overall Vuelta a Palencia

1st Stage 2 (TTT)

2009
1st Stage 5 Volta a Portugal
2011
8th Overall Tour de San Luis
9th Gran Premio de Llodio
2012
1st Rogaland GP
1st Stage 15 Vuelta a España
2013
Combativity award Stage 5 Vuelta a España
2016
10th Overall Tour de Langkawi
