= Mariano De Fino =

Uruguayan cyclist

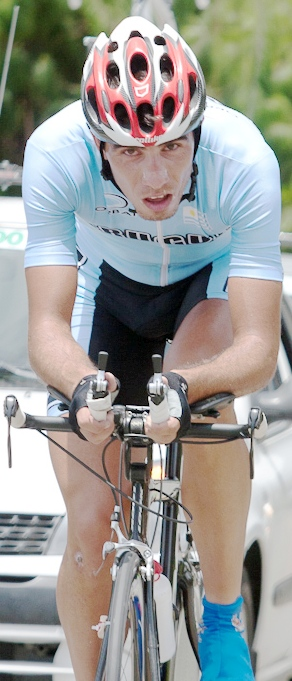
- De Fino in 2011

Personal information
- Full name: Mariano Ceferino De Fino Silveiro
- Born: 11 May 1983 (age 43) Salto, Uruguay

Cycling career
- Sport: Cycling
- Current team: Audax De Flores
- Discipline: Road
- Role: Rider

Amateur teams
- 2002: CC Salto Nuevo
- 2003: Avance de Pando
- 2006: Diputación de León
- 2007–2008: CC Amanecer
- 2009: Diputación de León
- 2009–2012: CA Villa Teresa
- 2012–2013: BROU-Flores
- 2014–2017: CC Fénix
- 2019: Salto Nuevo
- 2019–2020: Avenida Artigas de Guichón
- 2020–2021: CC Fénix
- 2021–2022: CC Ciudad del Plata
- 2022–2023: CA Villa Teresa
- 2024–: Audax De Flores

Professional teams
- 2004: Domina Vacanze (stagiaire)
- 2005: Naturino–Sapore di Mare

Mariano Ceferino De Fino Silveiro (born 11 May 1983) is a Uruguayan cyclist, who currently rides for amateur team Audax De Flores.

== Major results ==
2002
1st Overall Vuelta Ciclista de la Juventud
2004
3rd Time trial, Italian Under–23 Road Championships
9th Overall Volta de Ciclismo Internacional do Estado de São Paulo
2006
6th Overall Vuelta Ciclista a León
2010
2nd Time trial, National Road Championships
5th Overall Vuelta del Uruguay
2011
5th Overall Rutas de America
9th Overall Vuelta del Uruguay
2012
5th Overall Rutas de America
2013
9th Time trial, Pan American Road and Track Championships
2014
1st Overall Vuelta del Uruguay
2023
5th Time trial, Uruguayan Road Championships
