= Murilo Affonso =

Brazilian cyclist (born 1991)

Personal information
- Full name: Murilo Ferraz Affonso
- Born: 19 June 1991 (age 35) Brazil

Cycling career
- Sport: Cycling
- Current team: Suspended
- Discipline: Road
- Role: Rider

Amateur team
- 2018: Funvic/Soul Brasil Pro Cycling

Professional teams
- 2011–2013: Clube DataRo de Ciclismo–Foz do Iguaçu
- 2014: Ironage–Colner
- 2015–2017: Carrefour Funvic Soul Cycling Team

Murilo Ferraz Affonso (born 19 June 1991) is a Brazilian cyclist, who is currently suspended from the sport.

== Major results ==
2013
Pan American Under-23 Road Championships

4th Time trial
6th Road race

2014
1st Time trial, South American Games
5th Overall Volta Ciclística Internacional do Rio Grande do Sul
2015
4th Time trial, Pan American Games
4th Overall Vuelta del Uruguay
2016
1st Overall Volta Ciclística Internacional do Rio Grande do Sul

1st Stage 1

2017
~~2nd Overall Vuelta del Uruguay~~

~~1st Stage 3b (TTT)~~

2018
1st Stage 2a (TTT) Vuelta del Uruguay
