= Héctor Aguilar =

Héctor Aguilar may refer to:

- Héctor Aguilar Camín (born 1946), Mexican writer, journalist and historian
- Héctor Aguilar (cyclist) (born 1984), Uruguayan racing cyclist
- Héctor Aguilar (silversmith) (1905–1986), Mexican silversmith and jewellery designer
