= Federico Moreira =

Uruguayan cyclist

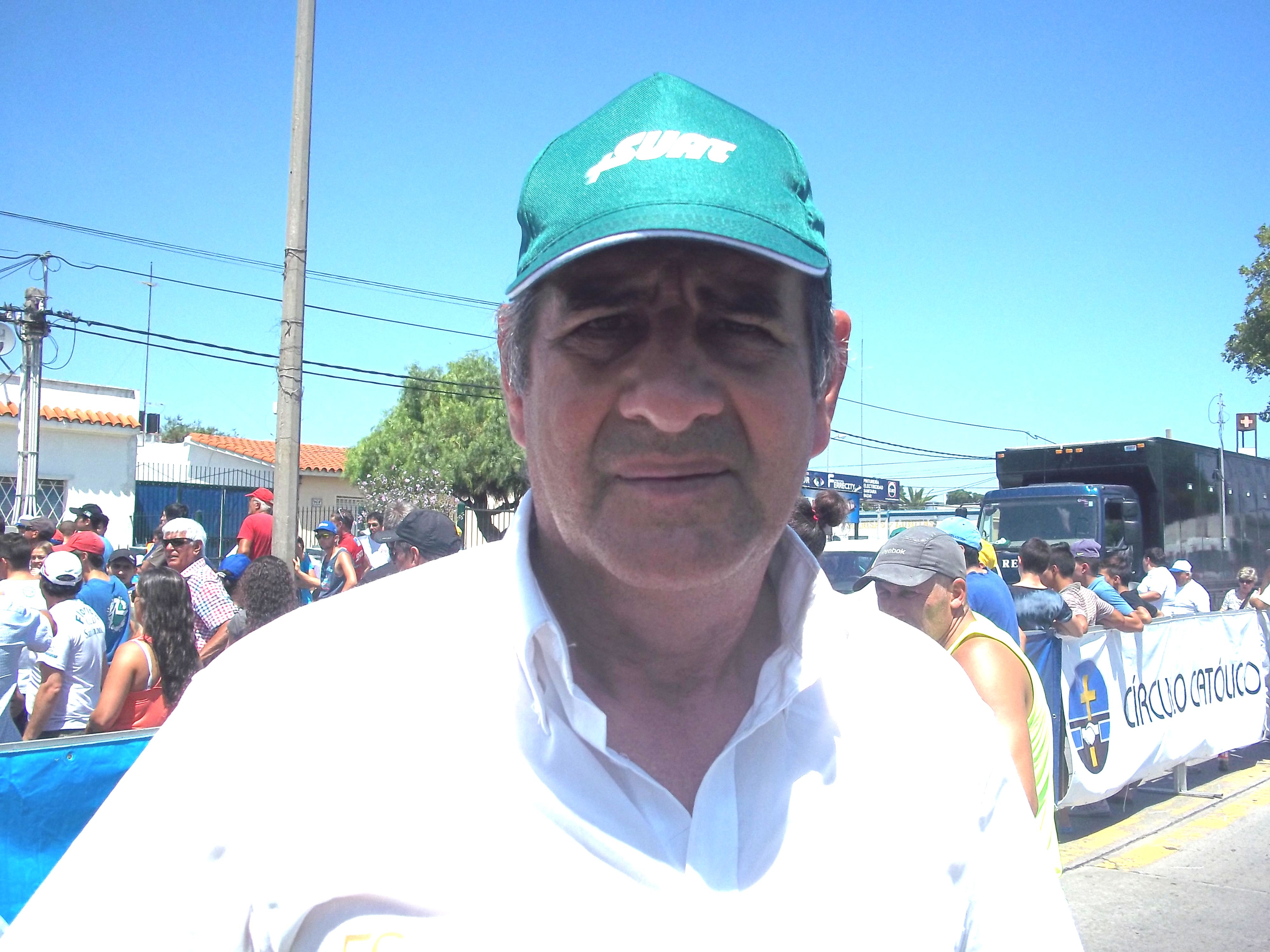

Personal information
- Born: 8 March 1961 (age 65)
Medal record
Men's cycling
Representing Uruguay
Pan American Games
Gold medal – first place	1987 Indianapolis	Points Race

Federico A. Moreira Wuilman (born 8 March 1961, in Salto) is a retired road bicycle racer and track cyclist from Uruguay.

Moreira represented his native country at two consecutive Summer Olympics, starting in 1988. He also won the gold medal in the Men's Points Race at the 1987 Pan American Games. Moreira won the 1985 edition of the Vuelta Ciclista de Chile. He also won 6 editions of the Vuelta del Uruguay.
