= Giorgio Brambilla =

Italian cyclist

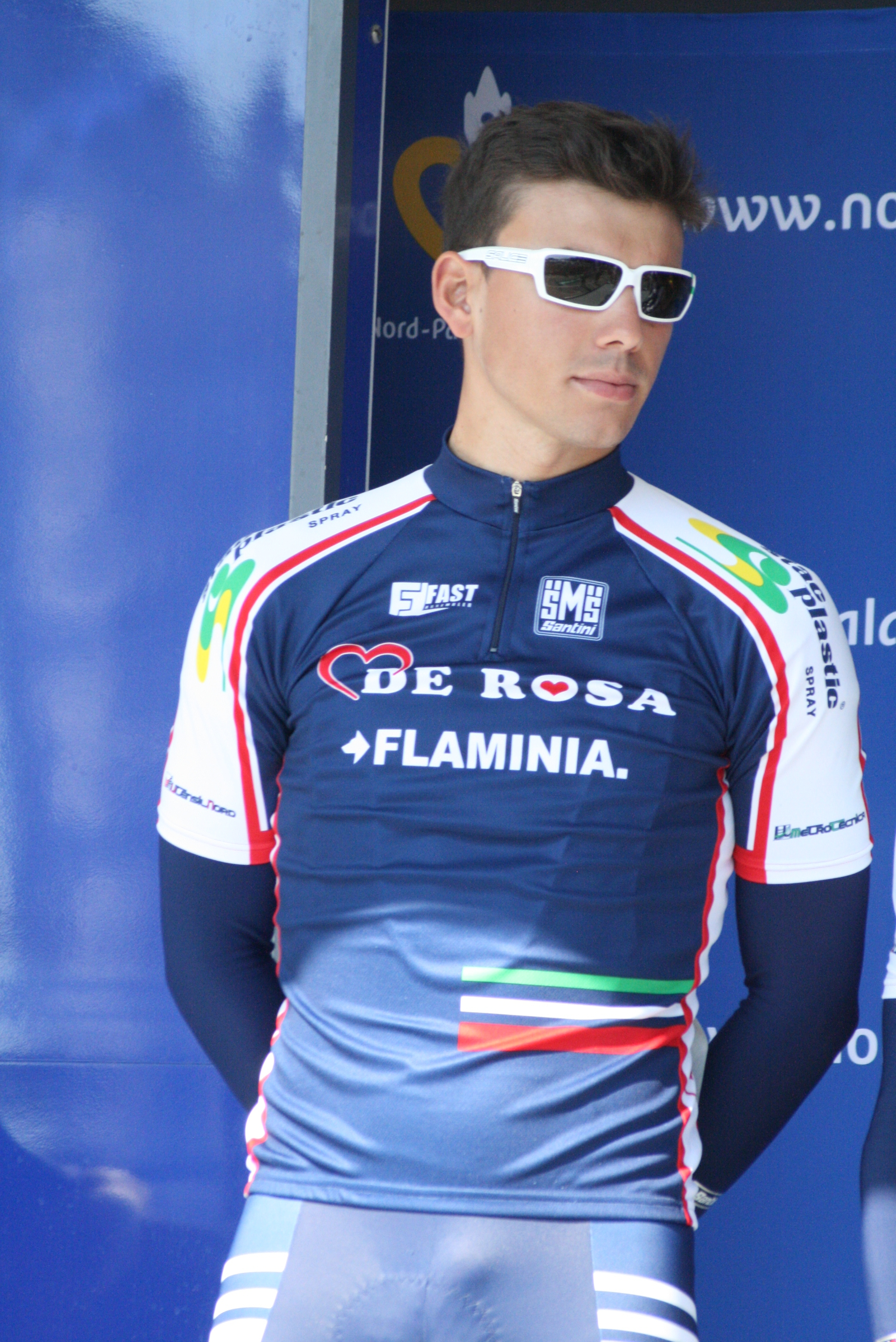
- Brambilla at the 2011 Four Days of Dunkirk

Personal information
- Nickname: Brambo
- Born: 19 September 1988 (age 38) Lecco, Italy

Cycling career
- Sport: Cycling
- Current team: Retired
- Discipline: Road
- Role: Rider

Professional teams
- 2010–2011: De Rosa–Stac Plastic
- 2012: Leopard–Trek Continental Team
- 2013: Atlas Personal–Jakroo
- 2014: Veranclassic–Doltcini

Giorgio Brambilla (born 19 September 1988) is an Italian former cyclist.

== Major results ==
2005
1st Stage 2 Grand Prix Rüebliland
3rd Trofeo Guido Dorigo
2006
2nd Overall Grand Prix Rüebliland
2007
7th GP Waregem
2008
2nd Paris–Roubaix Espoirs
2009
3rd Paris–Roubaix Espoirs
4th Gran Premio Inda
2010
7th GP Costa Degli Etruschi
2012
1st Dorpenomloop Rucphen
4th GP Costa Degli Etruschi
5th Sparkassen Münsterland Giro
6th Nokere Koerse
6th Antwerpse Havenpijl
10th Omloop van het Houtland
2013
3rd Overall Paris–Arras Tour
4th Overall Tour of China II
