= Alicorp =

Peruvian consumer goods company

Alicorp S.A.A.
- Company type: Public
- Traded as: BVL: ALICORC1
- Industry: Food & Beverages
- Founded: 1956
- Headquarters: Callao, Peru
- Area served: Latin America
- Key people: Dionisio Romero Paoletti (Chairman); Alfredo Perez (CEO)
- Revenue: ▲US$ 1.753 billion (2012)
- Operating income: ▲US$ 203.3 million (2012)
- Net income: ▲US$ 137.7 million (2012)
- Number of employees: 5,000
- Website: alicorp.com.pe

Alicorp is the largest Peruvian consumer goods company, with operations in South America.

== History ==
The company now known as Alicorp was started in 1956 as Industrias Teodoro Aldude and Anderson, Clayton & Co. as an oil and soap manufacturer in the port of Callao, Peru. In 1971, the Peruvian conglomerate Grupo Romero acquired Anderson, Clayton & Co. and renamed it Compañia Industrial Peru Pacifico S.A. (CIPPSA).
The company survived during the years of military rule in Peru and during the 1990s, embarked on several acquisitions. In 1993, it absorbed Calixto Romero S.A. and Compañia Oleaginosa Pisco S.A. which were also owned by Grupo Romero. In 1995, it acquired La Fabril S.A., the largest food manufacturer in Peru from Grupo Bunge y Born from Argentina. CIPPSA changed its name to Consorcio de Alimentos Fabril Pacifico S.A. (CFP) in 1995. CFP merged with Nicolini Hermanos S.A. and Compañia Molinera del Peru S.A. in 1996, and changed its name to Alicorp in 1997.

According to Ojo Público, in 2015, it concentrated 27% of the food industry in the country, with income of 1229.6 million soles.

== Acquisitions ==
- 2001 – Acquired assets and brands owned by the Peruvian subsidiary of Unilever.
- 2004 – Acquired Alimentum S.A. in order to enter the ice cream business.
- 2005 – Bought a laundry plant owned by Unilever and several laundry brands.
- 2006 – Acquired Asa Alimentos and Molinera Inca.
- 2008 – Acquired Colombian company PROPERSA and Argentinian company The Value Brand Company.
- 2010 – Acquired Argentinian company SANFORD
- 2012 – Acquired Chilean company SALMOFOOD, expanding its animal nutrition business.

== Financial results ==
Alicorp achieved revenues of 896 million dollars during 2007, a 40% increase compared to 2006.
Alicorp plans to boost sales to US$2 billion by 2013 based on foreign acquisitions and export projections.

== Main brands ==
=== Perú ===
- Cooking Oils: Primor, Capri, Cocinero, Cil, Friol
- Hair Care: Plusbelle
- Pasta: Don Vittorio, Nicolini, Lavaggi, Alianza, Espiga de Oro, Victoria
- Cookies: Casino, Glacitas, Victoria, Wazzu, Fénix, Tentación, Tejanas, Margarita, Divas, Integrackers, Choco Bum, Chomp
- Domestic Flour: Blanca Flor, Favorita
- Laundry Care: Bolívar, Opal, Marsella, Trome
- Spreads: Manty, Sello de Oro
- Juice: Kanú, Umsha
- Seasoning: AlaCena, AlaCena Tarí, Salsa Don Vittorio

=== Brazil ===
- Pastas: Santa Amália
- Hair Care: Plusbelle
- Chocolate Powder: Geneo
