= Walter Moyano =

Uruguayan cyclist

Personal information
- Born: 26 December 1933 (age 92)
- Died: Canelones, Uruguay

Cycling career
- Sport: Cycling

Walter Moyano (born 26 December 1933) is a former Uruguayan cyclist. He competed in the individual and team road race events at the 1956 Summer Olympics.
