= Anna Fino =

Italian mathematician

Anna Maria Fino
- Education: University of Turin
- Occupation: Mathematician
- Known for: Founding editor-in-chief, Complex Manifolds

Anna Maria Fino is an Italian mathematician specializing in differential geometry, complex geometry, and Lie groups. She is a professor of mathematics in the Giuseppe Peano Department of Mathematics at the University of Turin, and founding editor-in-chief of the journal Complex Manifolds.

== Education and career ==
Fino earned a laurea in mathematics in 1992 from the University of Turin. She completed her Ph.D. in 1997 through the Genoa-Turin University Consortium, with a dissertation Geometria e topologia degli spazi omogenei [Geometry and topology of homogeneous spaces] supervised by Simon Salamon.

She remained as a researcher at the University of Turin until 2005, when she became an associate professor. She earned a habilitation in 2013 and was promoted to full professor in 2015.

She has been editor-in-chief of Complex Manifolds since 2014 when it first began publication, as part of De Gruyter's "Emerging Science Journals" line of open-access journals.
