= Mauricio Moreira =

Uruguayan cyclist

Personal information
- Full name: Mauricio José Moreira Guarino
- Born: 18 July 1995 (age 31) Salto, Uruguay
- Height: 1.89 m (6 ft 2 in)
- Weight: 76 kg (168 lb)

Cycling career
- Sport: Cycling
- Current team: Efapel Cycling
- Discipline: Road
- Role: Rider

Amateur teams
- 2014–2015: Estudiantes el Colla
- 2016–2017: CC Fénix
- 2017–2018: Caja Rural–Seguros RGA amateur
- 2020: Vigo–Rías Baixas

Professional teams
- 2018–2019: Caja Rural–Seguros RGA
- 2021–2024: Efapel
- 2024–: Efapel Cycling

Mauricio José Moreira Guarino (born 18 July 1995) is a Uruguayan cyclist, who currently rides for UCI Continental team Efapel Cycling. On August 15, 2022, Moreira won the Tour of Portugal, having conquered the yellow jersey during the final stage, an individual time trial.

== Major results ==
2012
1st Time trial, National Junior Road Championships
2013
National Junior Road Championships

1st Road race
2nd Time trial

2015
2nd Road race, National Under-23 Road Championships
2016
1st Time trial, National Under-23 Road Championships
4th Time trial, National Road Championships
2017
1st Time trial, National Under-23 Road Championships
4th Time trial, National Road Championships
2018
4th Overall Volta ao Alentejo
2019
2nd Overall Boucles de la Mayenne

1st Stage 1

2021
1st Overall Volta ao Alentejo

1st Stage 5 (ITT)

2nd Overall Volta a Portugal

1st Combination classification
1st Stage 9

3rd Vuelta a Castilla y León
2022
1st Overall Volta a Portugal

1st Stages 3 & 10 (ITT)

2023
1st Overall Troféu Joaquim Agostinho
1st Overall Grande Prémio O Jogo

1st Stages 2 (ITT) & 4

1st Clássica da Primavera
4th Overall Volta ao Alentejo
5th Clássica Aldeias do Xisto
2024
1st Clássica Aldeias do Xisto
1st Stage 4 Grande Prémio O Jogo
2nd Overall Grande Prémio Abimota
2nd Overall GP Anicolor
