= LG L Fino =

Smartphone by LG Electronics

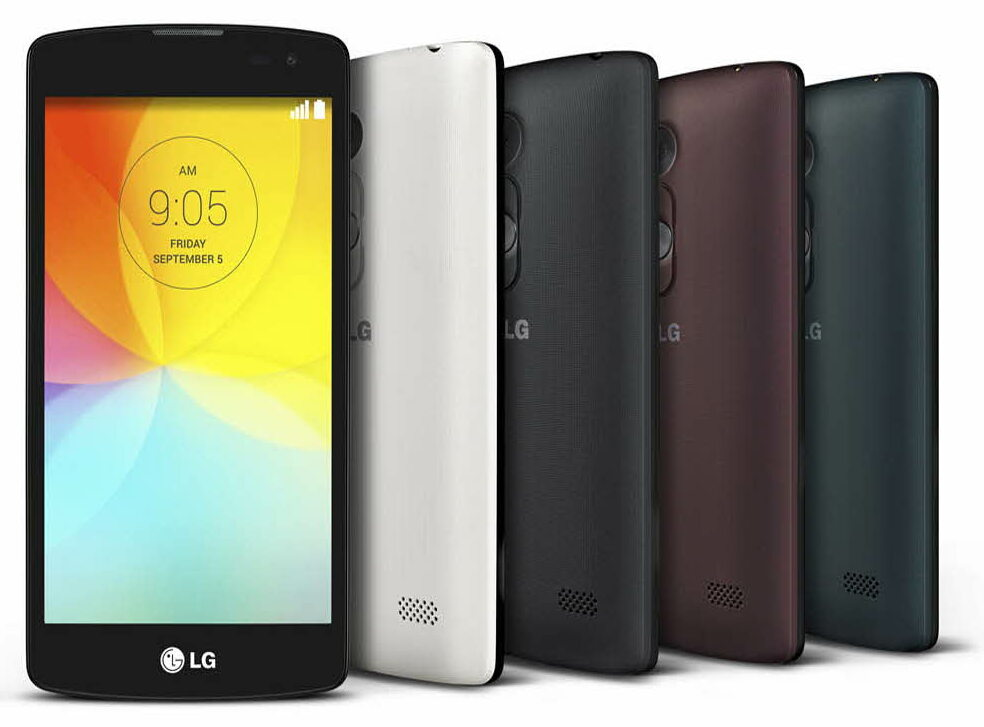
- Brand: LG
- Manufacturer: LG Electronics
- Related: LG L Bello
- Colors: White; Black; Gold; Red; Green
- Operating system: Android 4.4.2 KitKat
- System-on-chip: Qualcomm Snapdragon 200
- CPU: 1.2 GHz quad-core ARM Cortex-A7
- GPU: Adreno 302
- Memory: 1 GB LPDDR2 RAM
- Storage: 4 GB
- Battery: 1900 mAh Li-Ion removable battery
- Rear camera: 8 MP (LED flash, autofocus, 800x480 video recording)
- Front camera: VGA (640x480 video recording)
- Connectivity: Wi-Fi 802.11 b/g/n Bluetooth 4.1; GPS; GLONASS; BeiDou; 3.5 mm headphone jack

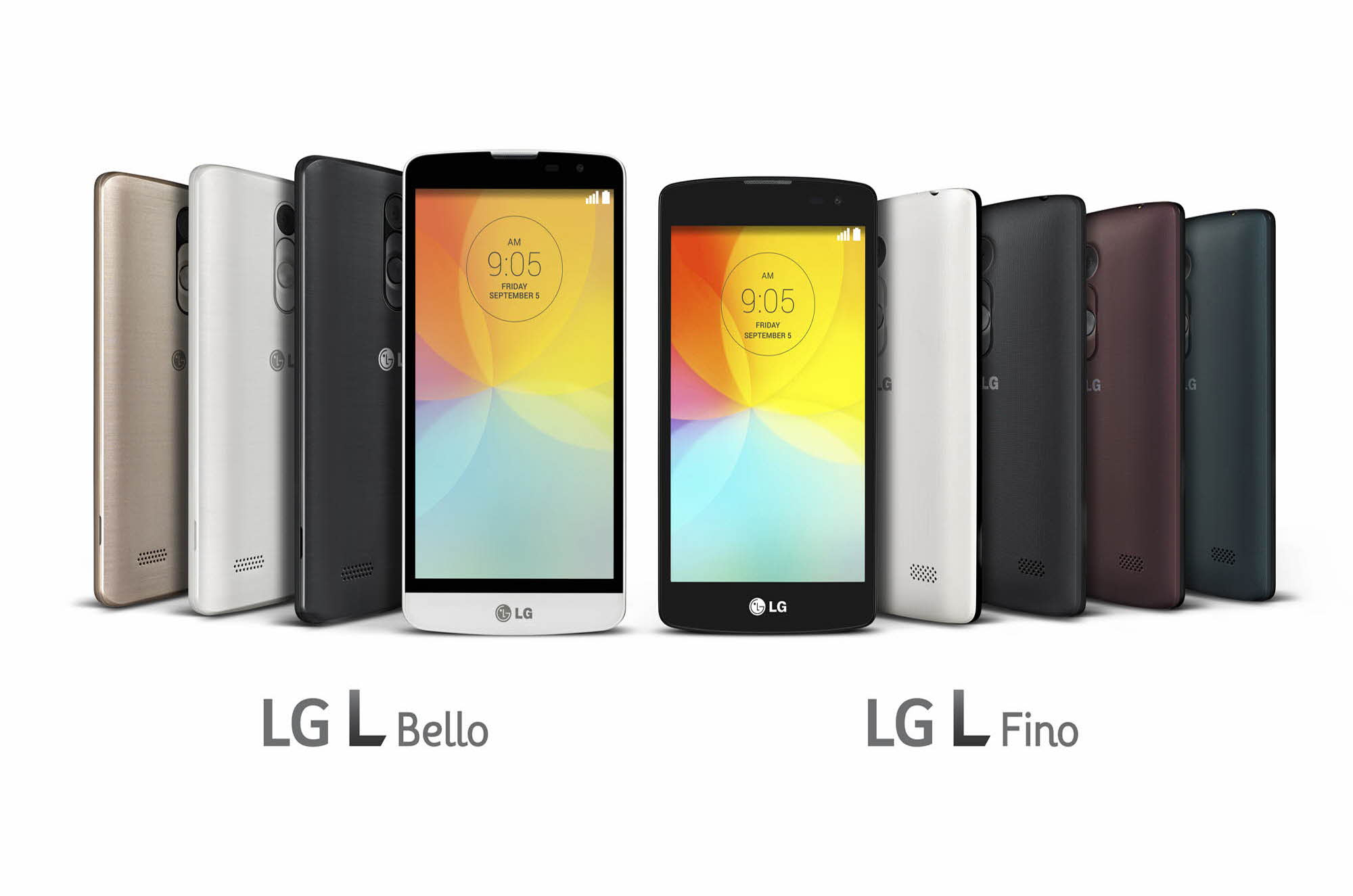
LG L Bello and LG L Fino

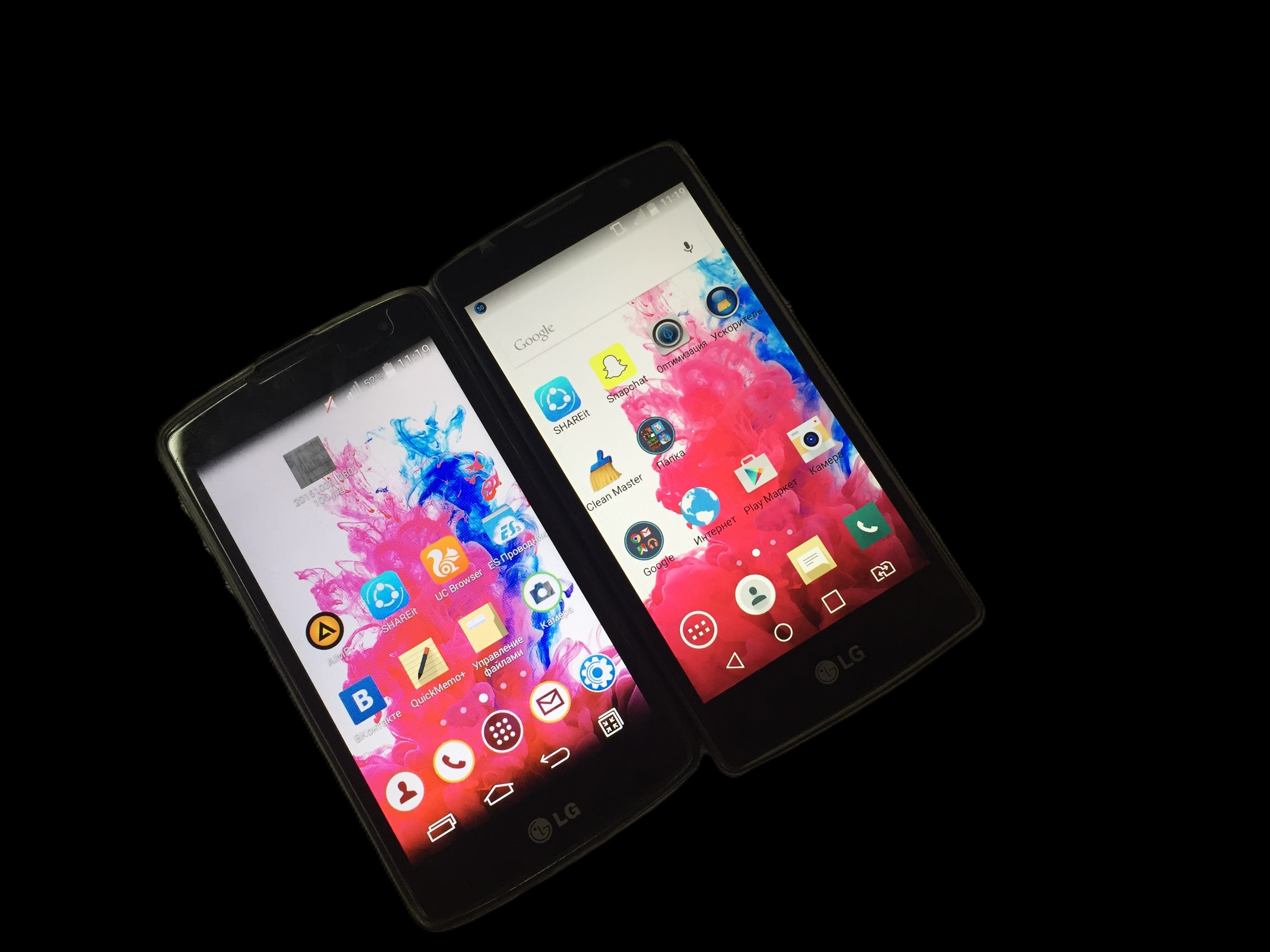
On the left is the LG-D295

The LG L Fino is an Android smartphone/phablet designed and manufactured by LG Electronics. It was released on 10 August 2014.

== Specifications ==
=== Design ===
LG L Fino features a design similar to the LG G3. The phone has a 4.5 inch display with sizable bezels; the top bezel includes the front-facing camera and the earpiece, and the bottom bezel has an "LG" logo. On the side frame, there is a 3.5 mm headphone jack and a microphone at the top, and there is a microUSB port and a microphone at the bottom. Unlike most of the smartphones, the power button and the volume buttons are located at the back under the rear-facing camera instead of the side frame; there is also an LED flash, an "LG" logo and a speaker at the back. The phone is made of plastic and the back cover is removable, removing the back cover reveals the removable battery.

LG L Fino is available in white, black, gold, red and green.

=== Hardware ===
LG L Fino features:the Qualcomm Snapdragon 200 system-on-chip with a 1.2 GHz quad-core ARM Cortex-A7 CPU and an Adreno 302 GPU. The phone comes with 1 GB RAM and 4 GB internal storage expandable through the microSD card slot. It has a 4.5 inch WVGA (480x800 pixels resolution) capacitive touchscreen with 207 ppi pixel density. It has a 1900 mAh removable Li-Ion battery.

LG L Fino has an 8 MP rear-facing camera with LED flash, Gesture Shot and Touch & Shoot, and a 0.3 MP (VGA) front-facing camera with Front Camera Light. The rear-facing camera can record videos at 800x480 pixels resolution and the front-facing camera can record videos at 640x480 pixels resolution.

=== Software ===
LG L Fino runs on Android 4.4.2 KitKat with LG's custom user interface. It comes with LG's Knock Code, tap to unlock and QuickMemo features, and LG's camera application.

== See also ==
- List of LG mobile phones
- List of Android devices
- Smartphone
- LG G series
