= Robert Méndez =

Chilean footballer

Personal information
- Full name: Robert Méndez Rodríguez
- Date of birth: 28 August 1989 (age 37)
- Place of birth: Concepción, Chile
- Position: Midfielder

Youth career
- Universidad de Concepción

Senior career*
Years	Team	Apps	(Gls)
2007–2010	Universidad de Concepción		
2009	→ Iberia (loan)		
2010	→ Fernández Vial (loan)		
- Chiguayante Sur
- * Club domestic league appearances and goals

Robert Méndez Rodríguez (born 28 August 1989) is a Chilean former footballer who played as a midfielder.

== Club career ==
Méndez began his career with Universidad de Concepción, signing a professional contract with the club at the age of eighteen. Despite showing promise at an early age, he was sent by then-manager Jorge Pellicer on loan to Tercera A side Iberia in 2009 - a move Méndez suggested may have simply been a mistake in a 2023 interview with Diario AS. On 26 October 2009, Méndez was involved in a car accident while travelling on the highway from Los Ángeles to Concepción; after his partner, who was driving, fell asleep, the car crashed into a sign and Méndez suffered an injury to his left foot, later requiring one of his toes to be amputated.

Having spent three months in hospital, and another three months recovering, Méndez was loaned again to the third division in 2010, this time joining Fernández Vial. After suffering a meniscus tear, he struggled to get game-time, and with his contract at Universidad de Concepción set to expire, he decided to retire. Following his retirement from professional football, he would feature for local amateur side Chiguayante Sur.

== International career ==
Though never called up to represent Chile in official games, Méndez was called up by then-Chile national team manager Marcelo Bielsa in 2007 to play for a squad of under-18 players, led by César Vaccia, in 'sparring' games with the senior squad.

== Style of play ==
Méndez was given the nickname "Chilean Messi" by then-Chile national team assistant manager, Eduardo Berizzo, as he shared a similar hairstyle and technical ability as Argentine football legend Lionel Messi.

== Later life ==
After his spell with Fernández Vial, he began to drink alcohol more frequently, and in a 2018 interview with El Mercurio, he stated that this led to him crashing his car a number of times. His local side, Chiguayante Sur, offered him a position on the team, as well as helping him get a job as a driver for a construction company. Following this, he became an electrical installer in Antofagasta, and later began studying to be a technician in mining processes.
