= Luis Sosa (cyclist) =

Uruguayan cyclist (born 1949)

Personal information
- Born: 15 October 1949 (age 77) Montevideo, Uruguay

Cycling career
- Sport: Cycling

Luis Sosa (born 15 October 1949) is a Uruguayan former cyclist. He competed in the team time trial at the 1968 Summer Olympics.
