= Volta Ciclística Internacional do Rio Grande do Sul =

Brazilian multi-day road cycling race

Volta do Rio Grande do Sul
Race details
- Region: Brazil
- Discipline: Road
- Competition: UCI America Tour
- Type: Stage race
- Web site: voltainternacional.wordpress.com

History
- First edition: 2009
- Editions: 6
- Final edition: 2016
- First winner: Ramiro Cabrera (URU)
- Most wins: No repeat winners
- Final winner: Murilo Affonso (BRA)

The Volta do Rio Grande do Sul (also known as the Volta Ciclística Internacional do Rio Grande do Sul and previously known as Volta Ciclística Internacional de Gravataí) was a stage cycling race held annually from 2009 to 2011 and 2014 to 2016 in Rio Grande do Sul, Brazil. It was rated 2.2 and was held as part of the UCI America Tour.

== Winners ==
Year	Country	Rider	Team
2009	Uruguay	Ramiro Cabrera	Avaí FC
2010	Colombia	Jaime Castañeda	EPM–UNE
2011	Brazil	Renato Seabra	Clube DataRo de Ciclismo-Foz do Iguaçu
2012– 2013	No race		
2014	Chile	José Luis Rodríguez Aguilar	Clos de Pirque–Trek
2015	Ecuador	Byron Guamá	Team Ecuador
2016	Brazil	Murilo Affonso	Funvic Soul Cycles–Carrefour
