= Carlos Alcántara (cyclist) =

Uruguayan cyclist

Carlos Alcantara
Personal information
- Born: 21 August 1948 (age 78) Montevideo, Uruguay

Cycling career
- Sport: Cycling

Carlos Alcantara (born 21 August 1948) is a Uruguayan former cyclist. He competed in the individual road race event at the 1976 Summer Olympics.
