= Rutas de América =

Race details
- Date: Late February
- Region: Uruguay
- Discipline: Road
- Competition: UCI America Tour
- Type: Stage race

History
- First edition: 1972
- Editions: 52 (as of 2024)
- First winner: Luis Sosa (URU)
- Most wins: Carlos Alcántara (URU); Federico Moreira (URU); Matías Presa (URU); (3 wins)
- Most recent: Agustín Moreira (URU)

Rutas de América is a multi-day road bicycle race held annually in February in Uruguay since 1972. From 2009 to 2012, the race was organized as a 2.2 event on the UCI America Tour.

== Winners ==
Year	Country	Rider	Team
1972	Uruguay	Luis Sosa	CC América
1973	Uruguay	Carlos Alcántara	Policial
1974	Uruguay	Waldemar Pedrazzi	Alas Rojas
1975	Uruguay	Nestor Berti	Social Progreso
1976	Uruguay	Ramon Cañete	Policial
1977	Uruguay	Ricardo Rondan	Atenas de Soriano
1978	Uruguay	Carlos Alcántara	Policial
1979	Uruguay	Victor Hugo González	CC América
1980	Uruguay	Carlos Alcántara	CC Amanecer
1981	Uruguay	José Rosello	Club Ciclista Fénix
1982	Uruguay	Federico Moreira	CC Maroñas
1983	Uruguay	Pedro Paiz	Club Ciclista Fénix
1984	Uruguay	José Asconegui	Belho Horizonte
1985	Uruguay	Ricardo Rondan	CSD Cruz del Sur
1986	Brazil	Wanderley Magalhaes	Caloi de Brasil
1987	Brazil	Marcos Mazzaron	Caloi de Brasil
1988	Uruguay	Federico Moreira	CC Amanecer
1989	Argentina	Eduardo Trillini	Club Ciclista Fénix
1990	Uruguay	José Maria Orlando	Peñarol
1991	Uruguay	Pablo Elizalde	CC Punta del Este
1992	Argentina	Gustavo Artacho	CC Punta del Este
1993	Uruguay	Pablo Elizalde	CC Punta del Este
1994	Uruguay	Sergio Tesitore	Belho Horizonte
1995	Uruguay	Gustavo Figueredo	Belho Horizonte
1996	Germany	Sven Teutenberg	US Postal Service
1997	Uruguay	Federico Moreira	Club Ciclista Fénix
1998	Uruguay	Milton Wynants	Alas Rojas
1999	Argentina	Emilio Carricondo	Argentina (national team)
2000	Uruguay	Gustavo Figueredo	Club Nacional
2001	Argentina	Javier Gomez	Alas Rojas
2002	Uruguay	Héctor Morales	Club Ciclista Fénix
2003	Uruguay	Miguel Direna	Villa Teresa
2004	Argentina	Matias Medici	Fénix
2005	Argentina	Matias Medici	Fénix
2006	Uruguay	Eleno Rodriguez	Fénix
2007	Uruguay	Milton Wynants	Policial
2008	Uruguay	Cristian Villanueva	Olimpico Juvenil de Flores
2009	Uruguay	Hernán Cline	Alas Rojas
2010	Uruguay	Hernán Cline	Alas Rojas
2011	Uruguay	Jorge Soto	Club Porongos
2012	Uruguay	Jorge Soto	Club Porongos
2013	Argentina	Laureano Rosas	Fénix
2014	Uruguay	Héctor Aguilar	BROU-Flores
2015	Uruguay	Néstor Pías	Schneck Ciclismo-Alas Rojas
2016	Uruguay	Héctor Aguilar	Schneck Ciclismo-Alas Rojas
2017	Argentina	Matías Médici	Avaí–FME Florianópolis–APGF
2018	Uruguay	Matías Presa	CC Cerro Largo
2019	Uruguay	Matías Presa	CC Cerro Largo
2020	Uruguay	Agustín Moreira	CC Cerro Largo
2021	No race		
2022	Argentina	Jorge Giacinti	CC Cerro Largo
2023	Uruguay	Matías Presa	CC Cerro Largo
2024	Uruguay	Agustín Moreira	CC Cerro Largo
