= Vuelta del Uruguay =

Stage cycling race held annually in Uruguay

Vuelta Ciclista del Uruguay
Race details
- Date: March-April
- Region: Uruguay
- Discipline: Road
- Competition: UCI America Tour; National calendar
- Type: Stage race
- Organiser: Uruguayan Cycling Federation

History
- First edition: 1939
- Editions: 81 (as of 2026)
- First winner: Leandro Noli (URU)
- Most wins: Federico Moreira (URU) (6 wins)
- Most recent: Pablo Bonilla (URU)

The Vuelta Ciclista del Uruguay is a stage cycling race held annually in Uruguay. It was created in 1939 and was a category 2.2 event of the UCI America Tour until 2019. The 2020 and 2021 editions were cancelled due to the Covid-19 pandemic. Since returning in 2022, the race has been held on the national calendar.

== Winners ==
Year	Country	Winner
1939	Uruguay	Leandro Noli
1941	Uruguay	Abel Vera
1946	Uruguay	Atilio François
1947	Uruguay	Atilio François
1948	Uruguay	Atilio François
1949	Uruguay	Luis Alberto Rodríguez
1950	Uruguay	Virgilio Pereyra
1951	Uruguay	Próspero Barrios
1952	Uruguay	Dante Sudatti
1953	Uruguay	Aníbal Donatti
1954	Uruguay	Luis Pedro Serra
1955	Uruguay	Luis Pedro Serra
1956	Uruguay	Juan Bautista Tiscornia
1957	Uruguay	Walter Moyano
1958	Uruguay	René Deceja
1959	Uruguay	Héctor Placeres
1960	Uruguay	Walter Moyano
1961	Uruguay	Gabriel Barrios
1962	Uruguay	Rubén Etchebarne
1963	Uruguay	Walter Moyano
1964	Uruguay	Walter Moyano
1965	Uruguay	Juan José Timón
1966	Uruguay	Tomás Correa
1967	Uruguay	René Deceja
1968	Uruguay	Jorge Correa
1969	Uruguay	Walter Moyano
1970	Italy	Giuseppe Maffei
1971	Brazil	Pedro de Souza
1972	Uruguay	Walter Tardáguila
1973	Uruguay	Dumas Rodríguez
1974	Uruguay	Ruben Messones
1975	Uruguay	Antonio Díaz
1976	Argentina	Raúl Labbate
1977	Uruguay	Carlos Alcántara
1978	Uruguay	Saúl Alcántara
1979	Uruguay	Gerardo Bruzzone
1980	Argentina	Juan Carlos Ruarte
1981	Uruguay	Alcides Etcheverry
1982	Argentina	Pedro Omar Caino
1983	Argentina	Eduardo Trillini
1984	Colombia	Rogelio Arango
1985	Uruguay	José Asconeguy
1986	Uruguay	Federico Moreira
1987	Uruguay	José Asconeguy
1988	Cuba	Ruben Campanioni
1989	Uruguay	Federico Moreira
1990	Uruguay	Federico Moreira
1991	Uruguay	Federico Moreira
1992	Argentina	Andrés Maizteguy
1993	Uruguay	José Asconeguy
1994	Russia	Viatcheslav Djavanian
1995	Uruguay	Gustavo Figueredo
1996	Uruguay	Milton Wynants
1997	Uruguay	Federico Moreira
1998	Argentina	Jorge Giacinti
1999	Uruguay	Federico Moreira
2000	Argentina	Javier Gómez
2001	Argentina	Javier Gómez
2002	Uruguay	Gustavo Figueredo
2003	Uruguay	Luis Alberto Martínez
2004	Argentina	Jorge Giacinti
2005	Uruguay	Alvaro Tardáguila
2006	Argentina	Guillermo Brunetta
2007	Uruguay	Jorge Bravo
2008	Uruguay	Richard Mascarañas
2009	United States	Scott Zwizanski
2010	Uruguay	Richard Mascarañas
2011	Colombia	Iván Casas
2012	Brazil	Magno Nazaret
2013	Brazil	Cristian da Rosa
2014	Uruguay	Mariano De Fino
2015	Chile	Carlos Oyarzún
2016	Uruguay	Néstor Pías
2017	Brazil	Magno Nazaret
2018	Brazil	Magno Nazaret
2019	Colombia	Walter Vargas
2022	Uruguay	Agustín Alonso
2023	Argentina	Jorge Giacinti
2024	Uruguay	Juan Caorsi
