= 2004 Vuelta a Venezuela =

Race details
- Dates: August 30 – September 12
- Stages: 14
- Distance: 1,968.5 km (1,223 mi)
- Winning time: 41h 51' 54"

Results
Jersey awarded to the overall winner	Winner	Federico Muñoz (COL)	(Triple Gordo Gob Lara)
	Second	Franklin Chacón (VEN)	(Loteria del Táchira)
	Third	José Rujano (VEN)	(Colombia Selle Italia)
	Points	Gil Cordovés (CUB)	(Gobernacíon del Zulía)
	Mountains	Fredy González (COL)	(Colombia Selle Italia)
	Youth	José Rujano (VEN)	(Colombia Selle Italia)
	Sprints	Gil Cordovés (CUB)	(Gobernacíon del Zulía)
	Team	Lotería del Táchira	

The 41st edition of the annual Vuelta a Venezuela was held from August 30 to September 12, 2004. The stage race started in Puerto la Cruz, and ended in Maracaibo.

== Stages ==
=== 2004-08-30: Puerto la Cruz — Puerto la Cruz (105 km) ===
Place	Stage 1		General Classification	
Place	Name	Time	Name	Time
1.	Gil Cordovés (CUB)	02:25.42	Gil Cordovés (CUB)	02:25.29
2.	Luis Díaz (VEN)	—	Luis Díaz (VEN)	+0.07
3.	Franklin Chacón (VEN)	—	Franklin Chacón (VEN)	+0.08

=== 2004-08-31: Barcelona — Punta de Mata (148.2 km) ===
Place	Stage 2		General Classification	
Place	Name	Time	Name	Time
1.	Gil Cordovés (CUB)	04:01.28	Gil Cordovés (CUB)	06:26.41
2.	Artur García (VEN)	—	Luis Díaz (VEN)	+0.19
3.	Luis Díaz (VEN)	—	Miguel Chacón (VEN)	+0.22

=== 2004-09-01: Maturín Circuito (136 km) ===
Place	Stage 3		General Classification	
Place	Name	Time	Name	Time
1.	Miguel Chacón (VEN)	03:09.31	Gil Cordovés (CUB)	09:36.06
2.	Gil Cordovés (CUB)	—	Miguel Chacón (VEN)	+0.18
3.	Marlon Pérez (COL)	—	Luis Díaz (VEN)	+0.25

=== 2004-09-02: Santa Bárbara de Tapirín — Paríaguan (184.8 km) ===
Place	Stage 4		General Classification	
Place	Name	Time	Name	Time
1.	José Chacón Díaz (VEN)	04:08.06	Gil Cordovés (CUB)	13:44.08
2.	Luis Díaz (VEN)	—	Miguel Chacón (VEN)	+0.22
3.	Gil Cordovés (CUB)	—	Luis Díaz (VEN)	+0.23

=== 2004-09-03: Paríaguan — Valle de la Pascua (164.7 km) ===
Place	Stage 5		General Classification	
Place	Name	Time	Name	Time
1.	Gil Cordovés (CUB)	03:33.10	Gil Cordovés (CUB)	17:17.08
2.	Miguel Chacón (VEN)	—	Miguel Chacón (VEN)	+0.26
3.	Fredy González (COL)	—	Luis Díaz (VEN)	+0.33

=== 2004-09-04: Chaguaramas — San Juan de Los Morros (184 km) ===
- Stage 6 result nullified after accident in final kilometre

=== 2004-09-05: San Juan de Los Morros — Los Guayos (113.2 km) ===
Place	Stage 7		General Classification	
Place	Name	Time	Name	Time
1.	Gil Cordovés (CUB)	02:36.58	Gil Cordovés (CUB)	19:53.56
2.	Artur García (VEN)	—	Miguel Chacón (VEN)	+0.36
3.	Marlon Pérez (COL)	—	Luis Díaz (VEN)	+0.43

=== 2004-09-06: Valencia — San Felipe (155.3 km) ===
Place	Stage 8		General Classification	
Place	Name	Time	Name	Time
1.	Fredy González (COL)	03:51.29	Gil Cordovés (CUB)	23:45.38
2.	Marlon Pérez (COL)	—	Miguel Chacón (VEN)	+0.23
3.	José Chacón Díaz (VEN)	—	José Chacón Díaz (VEN)	+0.30

=== 2004-09-07: San Felipe — Chivacoa (32 km) ===
Place	Stage 9-A (Individual Time Trial)		General Classification	
Place	Name	Time	Name	Time
1.	Federico Muñoz (COL)	00:39.24	Federico Muñoz (COL)	24:25.48
2.	José Rujano (VEN)	+0.04	Marlon Pérez (COL)	+0.12
3.	Marlon Pérez (COL)	+0.26	José Rujano (VEN)	+0.18

=== 2004-09-07: San Felipe Circuito (91.2 km) ===
Place	Stage 9-B		General Classification	
Place	Name	Time	Name	Time
1.	Gil Cordovés (CUB)	02:06.11	Federico Muñoz (COL)	26:31.59
2.	Jesús Pérez (VEN)	—	Marlon Pérez (COL)	+0.07
3.	Marlon Pérez (COL)	—	José Rujano (VEN)	+0.18

=== 2004-09-08: Yaritagua — Carora (118.2 km) ===
Place	Stage 10		General Classification	
Place	Name	Time	Name	Time
1.	Artur García (VEN)	02:33.25	Federico Muñoz (COL)	29:05.22
2.	Luis Díaz (VEN)	—	Marlon Pérez (COL)	+0.05
3.	Miguel Chacón (VEN)	—	José Rujano (VEN)	+0.20

=== 2004-09-09: Carora — El Dividive (143.1 km) ===
Place	Stage 11		General Classification	
Place	Name	Time	Name	Time
1.	Giovanny Báez (VEN)	03:10.27	Federico Muñoz (COL)	32:15.53
2.	Fredy González (COL)	+0.08	Marlon Pérez (COL)	+0.06
3.	Federico Muñoz (COL)	—	Franklin Chacón (VEN)	+0.24

=== 2004-09-10: Valera Circuito (116.0 km) ===
Place	Stage 12		General Classification	
Place	Name	Time	Name	Time
1.	Artur García (VEN)	02:54.42	Federico Muñoz (COL)	35:10.39
2.	Fredy González (COL)	—	Franklin Chacón (VEN)	+0.20
3.	Manuel Guevara (VEN)	—	José Rujano (VEN)	+0.37

=== 2004-09-11: Valera — Cabimas (177.9 km) ===
Place	Stage 13		General Classification	
Place	Name	Time	Name	Time
1.	Gil Cordovés (CUB)	03:53.13	Federico Muñoz (COL)	39:03.52
2.	Miguel Chacón (VEN)	—	Franklin Chacón (VEN)	+0.20
3.	José Rodríguez (VEN)	—	José Rujano (VEN)	+0.37

=== 2004-09-12: Circuito Maracaibo (118.3 km) ===
Place	Stage 14		General Classification	
Place	Name	Time	Name	Time
1.	Gil Cordovés (CUB)	02:48.02	Federico Muñoz (COL)	41:51.54
2.	Franklin Chacón (VEN)	—	Franklin Chacón (VEN)	+0.14
3.	Jesús Pérez (VEN)	—	José Rujano (VEN)	+0.37

== Final classification ==
RANK	NAME	TEAM	TIME
1.	Federico Muñoz (COL)	Triple Gordo Gob Lara	41:51:54
2.	Franklin Chacón (VEN)	Loteria del Táchira	+ 0.14
3.	José Rujano (VEN)	Colombia Selle Italia	+ 0.37
4.	Fredy González (COL)	Colombia Selle Italia	+ 0.38
5.	Libardo Niño (COL)	Gobernacíon del Zulía	+ 0.42
6.	Víctor Niño (COL)	Gobernacíon del Zulía	+ 0.53
7.	Tommy Alcedo (VEN)	Loteria del Táchira	+ 1.10
8.	Jairo Pérez (VEN)	Alc Los Guayos Carabobo	+ 1.44
9.	Carlos José Ochoa (VEN)	Gob Trujillo CTD	+ 1.47
10.	Artur García (VEN)	Kino Táchira	+ 2.11

== Teams ==
Lotería del Táchira A

1. (Venezuela) José Chacón Díaz
2. (Venezuela) Aldrin Salamanca
3. (Venezuela) Tommy Alcedo
4. (Venezuela) Franklin Chacón
5. (Colombia) César Salazar
6. (Venezuela) Manuel Guevara

Gob Zulia Alc Cabimas A

13. (Venezuela) Tomás Gil
14. (Venezuela) Adelso Valero
15. (Colombia) Raúl Saavedra
16. (Colombia) Libardo Niño
17. (Venezuela) Manuel Medina
18. (Cuba) Gil Cordovés

Triple Gordo Gob Lara A

25. (Colombia) Federico Muñoz
26. (Venezuela) Jesús Pérez
27. (Venezuela) Rodolfo Camacho
28. (Venezuela) José Araqué
29. (Venezuela) Isaac Ramírez
30. (Venezuela) José Ramos

PDVSA – PDV Anzoátegui A

37. (Venezuela) Luis Díaz
38. (Venezuela) Jean Belisario
39. (Venezuela) Antonio Ortíz
40. (Venezuela) Jonathan Hernández
41. (Venezuela) Giorgio Landaeta
42. (Venezuela) Isaac Cañizalez

PDVSA Norte Maturin A

49. (Venezuela) Darwin Urrea
50. (Venezuela) Wilmer Urbina
51. (Venezuela) Evert Rivas
52. (Venezuela) Javier Salazar
53. (Venezuela) Reinaldo Figuera
54. (Venezuela) Rubén Rangel

Alc Pariaguan Anzoátegui

67. (Venezuela) Williams García
68. (Venezuela) Joel Ruiz
69. (Venezuela) Richard Mayo
70. (Venezuela) Adrian Villarroel
71. (Venezuela) Adam Piamo
72. (Venezuela) Jefrid Mendoza

Alc Tinaco Cojedes

79. (Venezuela) Félix Alvarado
80. (Venezuela) Tibaldo Martínez
81. (Venezuela) José Pérez
82. (Venezuela) Argenis Sánchez
83. (Venezuela) José Hermoso
84. (Venezuela) Víctor Moreno

Loteria del Táchira B

97. (Venezuela) Rónald González
98. (Venezuela) Carlos Maya
99. (Venezuela) John Nava
100. (Venezuela) Paul Torres
101. (Venezuela) Juan Murillo

Gob Zulia Alc Cabimas C

109. (Colombia) Giovanny Báez
110. (Venezuela) Francisco Landaeta
111. (Venezuela) Dixon Carmona
112. (Venezuela) Deivis Urdaneta
113. (Venezuela) Carlos Sáenz
114. (Venezuela) José Contreras

Colombia Selle Italia

121. (Venezuela) José Rujano
122. (Colombia) Marlon Pérez
123. (Colombia) Fredy González
124. (Switzerland) Philippe Schnyder
125. (Colombia) Alexis Castro

Kino Táchira

133. (Venezuela) Artur García
134. (Venezuela) Jesús Rodríguez
135. (Venezuela) Miguel Ángel Chacón
136. (Venezuela) Liselfi Montoya

PDVSA PDV Anzoátegui B

143. (Venezuela) Juan Méndez
144. (Venezuela) José Piamo
145. (Venezuela) Jorgen Balza
146. (Venezuela) Luis González

Dos Pinos Costa Rica

7. (Costa Rica) Maikol Chavez
8. (Costa Rica) Luis García
9. (Costa Rica) José Montero
10. (Costa Rica) Warren Calvo
11. (Costa Rica) Esteban Castro
12. (Costa Rica) Nieves Carrasco

Colombian National Team

19. (Colombia) Álvaro Lozano
20. (Colombia) Urbelino Mesa
21. (Colombia) Freddy Paredes
22. (Colombia) Alexander González
23. (Colombia) Edison Paredes
24. (Colombia) Óscar Álvarez

Grefusa Altecar Chidutani

31. (Spain) Esteban Perales
32. (Spain) Óscar Crespo
33. (Spain) José Agullo
34. (Spain) Victorio Marina
35. (Spain) Oneire Mora

Gob Trujillo CTD Café Flor de Patri

43. (Venezuela) Carlos José Ochoa
44. (Venezuela) Wilmer Vasquez
45. (Venezuela) Víctor Becerra
46. (Venezuela) Luis Díaz
47. (Venezuela) Frederick Segura
48. (Venezuela) Daniel Medina

Jugos Prolaca Fundadeporte Carabobo

55. (Venezuela) Richard Ochoa
56. (Venezuela) Andris Hernández
57. (Venezuela) Maximo Rojas
58. (Venezuela) José Aguilar
59. (Venezuela) Albin Hernández
60. (Venezuela) José Rodríguez

Alc Los Guayos Carabobo

73. (Colombia) Jairo Pérez
74. (Venezuela) Jhonny Martínez
75. (Venezuela) José Bartolomé
76. (Venezuela) Alexis Chacón
77. (Venezuela) Yosmer Mendez
78. (Venezuela) Erwin Mendez

Gob Zulia Alc Cabimas B

91. (Colombia) Victor Niño
92. (Venezuela) Iván Castillo
93. (Venezuela) Juan Jiménez
94. (Venezuela) Henry Meneses
95. (Venezuela) Nelson Gelvez
96. (Venezuela) Edgar Ortega

Triple Gordo Gob Lara B

103. (Venezuela) Mario Figueroa
104. (Venezuela) Douglas Pérez
105. (Venezuela) Vladimir Forero
106. (Venezuela) Norberto Vizcayá
107. (Venezuela) César Suárez
108. (Colombia) Ricardo Mesa

Farara Tours Gob Amazonas

116. (Venezuela) Anthony Brea
117. (Venezuela) Alirio Contreras
118. (Venezuela) Nestor Chacón
119. (Venezuela) Elkin Infante
120. (Venezuela) José Tirado

ACT Snow Valley USA

127. (United States) Ward Solar
128. (United States) Jacob Stephens
129. (United States) Chia Kung
130. (United States) Kurt Hackler

PDVSA Norte Maturin B

139. (Venezuela) José Machado
140. (Venezuela) José Barrios
141. (Venezuela) Daniel Mata
142. (Venezuela) Geraldo Marquez

PDVSA Norte Maturin C

147. (Venezuela) Dicson Hernández
148. (Venezuela) Héctor Francis
149. (Venezuela) Danny Manrique
150. (Venezuela) Wilfredo Figueroa
