= 2003 Vuelta a Venezuela =

Race details
- Dates: September 8–21
- Stages: 14
- Distance: 2,212.6 km (1,375 mi)
- Winning time: 50h 37' 07"

Results
Jersey awarded to the overall winner	Winner	José Chacón Díaz (VEN)	(Loteria del Táchira)
	Second	Federico Muñoz (COL)	(Triple Gordo Gob.)
	Third	Tomás Gil (VEN)	(Triple Gordo Gob.)
	Points	Gil Cordovés (CUB)	(Gobernacíon del Zulía)
	Mountains	Manuel Medina (VEN)	(Gobernacíon del Zulía)
	Youth	Freddy Vargas (VEN)	(Kino Táchira)
	Sprints	Gil Cordovés (CUB)	(Gobernacíon del Zulía)
	Team	Lotería del Táchira	

The 40th edition of the annual Vuelta a Venezuela was held from September 8 to September 21, 2003. The stage race started in Tucupita, and ended in San Felipe, Yaracuy.

== Stages ==
=== 2003-09-08: Tucupita Circuito (93 km) ===
Place	Stage 1		General Classification	
Place	Name	Time	Name	Time
1.	Gil Cordovés (CUB)	02:07.35	Gil Cordovés (CUB)	02:07.28
2.	Honorio Machado (VEN)	—	Félix Álvarado (VEN)	+0.02
3.	Alvaro Tardáguila (URU)	—	Honorio Machado (VEN)	+0.03

=== 2003-09-09: Tucupita — Maturín (191.4 km) ===
Place	Stage 2		General Classification	
Place	Name	Time	Name	Time
1.	Tommy Alcedo (VEN)	04:15.03	Tommy Alcedo (VEN)	06:22.31
2.	José Pérez (VEN)	+0.13	Honorio Machado (VEN)	+0.14
3.	Luis Díaz (VEN)	+0.14	Gil Cordovés (CUB)	+0.14

=== 2003-09-10: Punta de Mata — Pariaguán (196.6 km) ===
Place	Stage 3		General Classification	
Place	Name	Time	Name	Time
1.	Gil Cordovés (CUB)	04:15.06	Tommy Alcedo (VEN)	10:37.37
2.	Honorio Machado (VEN)	—	Gil Cordovés (CUB)	+0.04
3.	Miguel Ubeto (VEN)	—	Honorio Machado (VEN)	+0.10

=== 2003-09-11: Pariaguán — Valle de la Pascua (165.4 km) ===
Place	Stage 4		General Classification	
Place	Name	Time	Name	Time
1.	Tony Linares (VEN)	03:43.05	Tommy Alcedo (VEN)	14:20.45
2.	Alvaro Tardáguila (URU)	—	Gil Cordovés (CUB)	+0.06
3.	Tommy Alcedo (VEN)	+0.50	Tony Linares (VEN)	+0.06

=== 2003-09-12: Valle de la Pascua — El Socorro (38.6 km) ===
Place	Stage 5-A (Individual Time Trial)		General Classification	
Place	Name	Time	Name	Time
1.	José Chacón Díaz (VEN)	00:45.32,33	José Chacón Díaz (VEN)	15:06.40
2.	Tomás Gil (VEN)	+0.15,71	Tomás Gil (VEN)	+0.16
3.	Matías Medici (ARG)	+1.35,53	Carlos Ochoa (VEN)	+1.37

=== 2003-09-12: Valle de la Pascua Circuito (73 km) ===
Place	Stage 5-B		General Classification	
Place	Name	Time	Name	Time
1.	Gil Cordovés (CUB)	01:36.58	José Chacón Díaz (VEN)	16:43.38
2.	Honorio Machado (VEN)	—	Tomás Gil (VEN)	+0.16
3.	Jean Belisario (VEN)	—	Carlos Ochoa (VEN)	+1.37

=== 2003-09-13: El Sombrero — Maracay (159 km) ===
Place	Stage 6		General Classification	
Place	Name	Time	Name	Time
1.	Gil Cordovés (CUB)	03:15.23	José Chacón Díaz (VEN)	19:59.01
2.	Luis Díaz (VEN)	—	Tomás Gil (VEN)	+0.16
3.	Miguel Chacón (VEN)	—	Carlos Ochoa (VEN)	+1.37

=== 2003-09-14: Valencia Circuito (78 km) ===
Place	Stage 7-A		General Classification	
Place	Name	Time	Name	Time
1.	Honorio Machado (VEN)	01:26.43	José Chacón Díaz (VEN)	21:25.44
2.	Artur García (VEN)	—	Tomás Gil (VEN)	+0.16
3.	José Aguilar (VEN)	—	Carlos Ochoa (VEN)	+1.37

=== 2003-09-14: Los Guayos — Tinaco (99.7 km) ===
Place	Stage 7-B		General Classification	
Place	Name	Time	Name	Time
1.	Alejandro González (ARG)	02:08.50	José Chacón Díaz (VEN)	23:36.42
2.	José Pino (VEN)	—	Tomás Gil (VEN)	+0.16
3.	Daniel Piamo (VEN)	—	Carlos Ochoa (VEN)	+1.37

=== 2003-09-15: San Carlos de Austria — Guanare (164.2 km) ===
Place	Stage 8		General Classification	
Place	Name	Time	Name	Time
1.	Gil Cordovés (CUB)	04:01.32	José Chacón Díaz (VEN)	27:38.14
2.	Luis Díaz (VEN)	—	Tomás Gil (VEN)	+0.16
3.	Frederick Segura (VEN)	—	Carlos Ochoa (VEN)	+1.37

=== 2003-09-16: Socopó — San Cristóbal (210.2 km) ===
Place	Stage 9		General Classification	
Place	Name	Time	Name	Time
1.	Federico Muñoz (COL)	05:13.30	José Chacón Díaz (VEN)	32:51.42
2.	Manuel Medina (VEN)	—	Federico Muñoz (COL)	+1.35
3.	José Chacón Díaz (VEN)	—	Tomás Gil (VEN)	+2.08

=== 2003-09-17: La Fría — Santa Cruz de Mora (131.4 km) ===
Place	Stage 10		General Classification	
Place	Name	Time	Name	Time
1.	José Chacón Díaz (VEN)	03:17.17	José Chacón Díaz (VEN)	36:08.52
2.	Federico Muñoz (COL)	+0.01	Federico Muñoz (COL)	+1.39
3.	Carlos Maya (VEN)	—	Tomás Gil (VEN)	+2.16

=== 2003-09-18: El Vigía — El Dividive (163.1 km) ===
Place	Stage 11		General Classification	
Place	Name	Time	Name	Time
1.	Jesús Pérez (VEN)	03:26.21	José Chacón Díaz (VEN)	39:47.43
2.	Abel Jochola (GUA)	—	Federico Muñoz (COL)	+1.39
3.	Paul Torres (VEN)	+0.02	Tomás Gil (VEN)	+2.16

=== 2003-09-19: El Dividive — Carora (140.7 km) ===
Place	Stage 12		General Classification	
Place	Name	Time	Name	Time
1.	Gil Cordovés (CUB)	03:26.49	José Chacón Díaz (VEN)	43:14.32
2.	Alejandro González (ARG)	—	Federico Muñoz (COL)	+1.39
3.	Luis Díaz (VEN)	—	Tomás Gil (VEN)	+2.16

=== 2003-09-20: Carora — San Pablo de Yaracuy (179.3 km) ===
Place	Stage 13		General Classification	
Place	Name	Time	Name	Time
1.	Deibis Urdaneta (VEN)	04:11.57	José Chacón Díaz (VEN)	47:28.30
2.	Andris Hernández (VEN)	+0.01	Federico Muñoz (COL)	+1.37
3.	Freddy Alvarado (VEN)	+0.02	Tomás Gil (VEN)	+2.16

=== 2003-09-21: San Felipe Circuito (129 km) ===
Place	Stage 14		General Classification	
Place	Name	Time	Name	Time
1.	Gil Cordovés (CUB)	03:08.37	José Chacón Díaz (VEN)	50:37.07
2.	Luis Díaz (VEN)	—	Federico Muñoz (COL)	+1.37
3.	Miguel Ubeto (VEN)	—	Tomás Gil (VEN)	+2.16

== Final classification ==
RANK	NAME	TEAM	TIME
1.	José Chacón Díaz (VEN)	Loteria del Táchira	50:37:07
2.	Federico Muñoz (COL)	Triple Gordo Gobernacíon de Lara A	+ 1.37
3.	Tomás Gil (VEN)	Triple Gordo Gobernacíon de Lara A	+ 2.16
4.	Franklin Chacón (VEN)	Loteria del Táchira	+ 2.50
5.	Carlos José Ochoa (VEN)	Gobernacíon Trujillo Café Flor de Patria	+ 3.37
6.	Álvaro Lozano (COL)	Gobernacíon del Zulía	+ 3.38
7.	Tommy Alcedo (VEN)	Loteria del Táchira	+ 3.49
8.	Carlos Maya (VEN)	Loteria del Táchira	+ 3.54
9.	Miguel Ubeto (VEN)	Triple Gordo Gobernacíon de Lara A	+ 5.06
10.	Manuel Medina (VEN)	Gobernacíon del Zulía	+ 5.17
