= Carlos Maya =

Venezuelan cyclist (born 1972)

Personal information
- Born: 16 March 1972 (age 54) Mérida, Venezuela

Cycling career
- Sport: Cycling
- Current team: Retired
- Discipline: Road
- Role: Rider

Amateur teams
- 2002–2005: Lotería del Táchira
- 2006: Gobernación del Zulia–Alcaldía de Cabimas
- 2007: Gobernación Bolivariano Carabobo

Professional teams
- 1992–1994: ZG Mobili–Selle Italia
- 1995: Castellblanch

Carlos Alberto Maya Lizcano (born 16 March 1972) is a Venezuelan former professional track and road racing cyclist. He competed in three consecutive Summer Olympics for his native country: 1992, 1996 and 2000. He also rode in the 1995 Vuelta a España, where he finished 47th overall.

== Major results ==
1992
3rd Road race, National Road Championships
1993
2nd Road race, National Road Championships
1995
1st Overall Vuelta al Táchira
1998
8th Overall Vuelta al Táchira
2000
2nd Overall Vuelta al Táchira

1st Stages 7 & 12

2001
2nd Overall Vuelta al Táchira

1st Stage 9

2003
1st Overall Clasico Ciclistico Banfoandes
2nd Overall Vuelta al Táchira
2004
3rd Overall Vuelta a Guatemala

1st Stages 11 & 12

3rd Overall Vuelta al Táchira
2005
1st Stage 3a Vuelta a Venezuela (TTT) (with Iván Castillo, José Serpa, Franklin Chacón, Manuel Medina, & Nelson Gelvez)
3rd Overall Vuelta al Táchira

1st Stage 14

4th Overall Clasico Ciclistico Banfoandes

1st Stage 6

2006
9th Overall Vuelta al Táchira
2007
4th Overall Vuelta al Táchira

1st Stage 2 (TTT) (with José Chacón Díaz, Jackson Rodríguez, Rónald González, and César Salazar)

5th Overall Clasico Ciclistico Banfoandes

1st Stage 7
