= 2009 Vuelta a Venezuela =

2008–2009 UCI America Tour
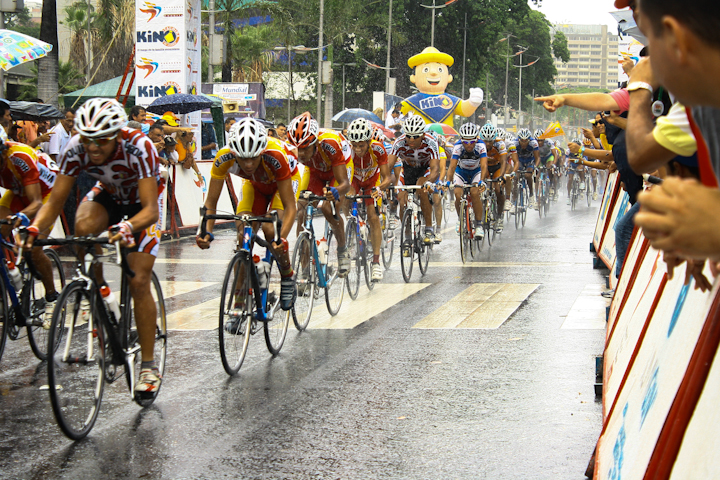
- Peloton at the last stage of the 2009 Vuelta a Venezuela

Race details
- Dates: June 24 – July 5
- Stages: 12
- Distance: 1,560.6 km (969.7 mi)
- Winning time: 39h 09' 51"

Results
| Jersey awarded to the overall winner | Winner | José Rujano (VEN) | (Gobernacion del Zulía) |
| | Second | César Salazar (COL) | (Loteria del Tachirá) |
| | Third | José Chacón Díaz (VEN) | (G. Carabobo-Tra. Ele) |
| | Points | Honorio Machado (VEN) | (Alcadia Bol.Jimenez) |
| | Mountains | José Rujano (VEN) | (Gobernacion del Zulía) |
| | Youth | José Alarcón (VEN) | (Sumiglov) |
| | Team | Lotería del Táchira | |

The 46th edition of the annual Vuelta a Venezuela was held from Wednesday June 24 to Sunday July 5, 2009.

== Stages ==
=== 2009-06-24: Puerto la Cruz - Puerto la Cruz (80 km) ===
| Place | Stage 1 | | General Classification | |
| Place | Name | Time | Name | Time |
|---|---|---|---|---|
| 1. | Alberto Loddo (ITA) | 02:09.21 | Alberto Loddo (ITA) | 02:09.11 |
| 2. | José Aguilar (VEN) | — | José Aguilar (VEN) | +0.03 |
| 3. | Mattia Gavazzi (ITA) | — | Mattia Gavazzi (ITA) | +0.06 |

=== 2009-06-25: Barcelona - El Tigre (175.6 km) ===
| Place | Stage 2 | | General Classification | |
| Place | Name | Time | Name | Time |
|---|---|---|---|---|
| 1. | Alberto Loddo (ITA) | 04:18.06 | Alberto Loddo (ITA) | 06:27.17 |
| 2. | Mattia Gavazzi (ITA) | — | Mattia Gavazzi (ITA) | — |
| 3. | Alien García (CUB) | — | José Aguilar (VEN) | +0.03 |

=== 2009-06-26: Anaco Circuito (50 km) ===
| Place | Stage 3-A | | General Classification | |
| Place | Name | Time | Name | Time |
|---|---|---|---|---|
| 1. | Mattia Gavazzi (ITA) | 00:40.30 | | |
| 2. | Honorio Machado (VEN) | — | | |
| 3. | Franklin Molina (VEN) | — | | |

=== 2009-06-26: Aragua de Barcelona - Valle de la Pascua (135 km) ===
| Place | Stage 3-B | | General Classification | |
| Place | Name | Time | Name | Time |
|---|---|---|---|---|
| 1. | Mattia Gavazzi (ITA) | 03:31.32 | Wilmer Bravo (VEN) | 10:39.20 |
| 2. | Franklin Chacón (VEN) | — | Honorio Machado (VEN) | — |
| 3. | Jesús Pérez (VEN) | — | José Aguilar (VEN) | +0.02 |

=== 2009-06-27: Valle de la Pascua - Valle de la Pascua (93 km) ===
| Place | Stage 4 | | General Classification | |
| Place | Name | Time | Name | Time |
|---|---|---|---|---|
| 1. | Mattia Gavazzi (ITA) | 02:12.54 | José Aguilar (VEN) | 12:52.07 |
| 2. | José Aguilar (VEN) | — | Honorio Machado (VEN) | +0.02 |
| 3. | Honorio Machado (VEN) | — | Mattia Gavazzi (ITA) | +0.04 |

=== 2009-06-28: Chaguaramas - Calabozo (169.5 km) ===
| Place | Stage 5 | | General Classification | |
| Place | Name | Time | Name | Time |
|---|---|---|---|---|
| 1. | Jesús Pérez (VEN) | 04:16.35 | José Aguilar (VEN) | 17:08.42 |
| 2. | Tomás Teresen (VEN) | — | Honorio Machado (VEN) | +0.02 |
| 3. | Julio Herrera (VEN) | — | Mattia Gavazzi (ITA) | +0.04 |

=== 2009-06-29: El Sombrero - San Carlos de Austria (225 km) ===
| Place | Stage 6 | | General Classification | |
| Place | Name | Time | Name | Time |
|---|---|---|---|---|
| 1. | Honorio Machado (VEN) | 05:21.11 | Honorio Machado (VEN) | 22:29.44 |
| 2. | Frederick Segura (VEN) | — | José Aguilar (VEN) | +0.09 |
| 3. | Weimar Roldán (COL) | — | Mattia Gavazzi (ITA) | +0.13 |

=== 2009-06-30: Turén - Turén (35 km) ===
| Place | Stage 7 (Individual Time Trial) | | General Classification | |
| Place | Name | Time | Name | Time |
|---|---|---|---|---|
| 1. | José Serpa (COL) | 00:40.59 | José Serpa (COL) | 23:11.28 |
| 2. | José Chacón Díaz (VEN) | +0.21 | José Chacón Díaz (VEN) | +0.01 |
| 3. | César Salazar (COL) | +0.27 | César Salazar (COL) | +0.07 |

=== 2009-07-01: Acarigua - Sanaré (163.4 km) ===
| Place | Stage 8 | | General Classification | |
| Place | Name | Time | Name | Time |
|---|---|---|---|---|
| 1. | José Rujano (VEN) | 03:44.29 | José Rujano (VEN) | 26:56.50 |
| 2. | Víctor Moreno (VEN) | +1.15 | César Salazar (COL) | +0.32 |
| 3. | Carlos José Ochoa (VEN) | +1.16 | José Chacón Díaz (VEN) | +1.00 |

=== 2009-07-02: Quibor - Nirgua (160 km) ===
| Place | Stage 9 | | General Classification | |
| Place | Name | Time | Name | Time |
|---|---|---|---|---|
| 1. | José Rujano (VEN) | 04:12.18 | José Rujano (VEN) | 31:08.56 |
| 2. | Carlos José Ochoa (VEN) | +0.49 | César Salazar (COL) | +1.28 |
| 3. | César Salazar (COL) | +0.49 | José Chacón Díaz (VEN) | +2.31 |

=== 2009-07-03: San Felipe Circuito (80 km) ===
| Place | Stage 10 | | General Classification | |
| Place | Name | Time | Name | Time |
|---|---|---|---|---|
| 1. | Honorio Machado (VEN) | 01:32.39 | José Rujano (VEN) | 32:41.35 |
| 2. | Mattia Gavazzi (ITA) | — | César Salazar (COL) | +1.28 |
| 3. | Jesús Pérez (VEN) | — | José Chacón Díaz (VEN) | +2.31 |

=== 2009-07-04: San Felipe - Turmero (181.5 km) ===
| Place | Stage 11 | | General Classification | |
| Place | Name | Time | Name | Time |
|---|---|---|---|---|
| 1. | Weimar Roldán (COL) | 04:17.49 | José Rujano (VEN) | 37:00.13 |
| 2. | Miguel Chacón (VEN) | — | César Salazar (COL) | +1.28 |
| 3. | Fredy Burgos (CUB) | — | José Chacón Díaz (VEN) | +2.31 |

=== 2009-07-05: Caracas - Caracas (81.6 km) ===
| Place | Stage 12 | | General Classification | |
| Place | Name | Time | Name | Time |
|---|---|---|---|---|
| 1. | Jesús Pérez (VEN) | 02:09.39 | José Rujano (VEN) | 39:09.51 |
| 2. | Frederick Segura (VEN) | — | César Salazar (COL) | +1.29 |
| 3. | Miguel Chacón (VEN) | — | José Chacón Díaz (VEN) | +2.32 |

== Final classification ==
| RANK | NAME | TEAM | TIME |
|---|---|---|---|
| 1. | José Rujano (VEN) | Gobernacíon del Zulía | 39:09:51 |
| 2. | César Salazar (COL) | Loteria del Táchira | + 1.29 |
| 3. | José Chacón Díaz (VEN) | G. Carabobo-Tra. Ele | + 2.32 |
| 4. | José Alarcón (VEN) | Sumiglov-City of Mérida | + 2.42 |
| 5. | Carlos José Ochoa (VEN) | Serramenti PVC Diquigiovanni | + 2.43 |
| 6. | Rodolfo Camacho (COL) | Loteria del Táchira | + 3.16 |
| 7. | José Alirio Contreras (VEN) | Sumiglov-City of Mérida | + 4.45 |
| 8. | Yeison Delgado (VEN) | Loteria del Táchira | + 4.57 |
| 9. | Yosvang Rojas (VEN) | G. Carabobo-Tra. Ele | + 5.35 |
| 10. | Edwin Becerra (VEN) | Sumiglov-City of Mérida | + 5.41 |

== See also ==
- 2009 Vuelta al Táchira
