= Cycling at the 2010 South American Games – Men's road race =

The Men's Road Race event at the 2010 South American Games was held at 12:30 on March 22.

== Medalists ==
Gold	Silver	Bronze
Santiago Botero; Colombia	Luis Felipe Laverde; Colombia	Sergio Henao; Colombia

== Results ==
Race distance: 73.2 km

Rank	Rider	Time	Time Behind	Speed
1st place, gold medalist(s)	Santiago Botero (COL)	3:49:03		38.349
2nd place, silver medalist(s)	Luis Felipe Laverde (COL)	s.t.		
3rd place, bronze medalist(s)	Sergio Henao (COL)	s.t.		
4	Fabio Duarte (COL)	3:57:13	+8:10	
5	Bayron Patricio de la Cruz (ECU)	3:59:29	+10:26	
6	Carlos Ivan Guñez (CHI)	s.t.		
7	Carlos José Ochoa (VEN)	4:00:51	+11:48	
8	Jaime Castañeda (COL)	4:02:25	+13:22	
9	Juan Pablo Suárez (COL)	4:03:39	+14:36	
10	Tomás Gil (VEN)	s.t.		
11	Jorge Luis Revelo (ECU)	s.t.		
12	Pedro Amauri dos Santos (CHI)	s.t.		
13	Oscar Vilca (BOL)	4:03:53	+14:50	
14	José Alarcón (VEN)	4:07:06	+18:03	
15	Sebastian Ricardo Urbina (CHI)	4:08:31	+19:28	
	Mauricio Morandi (BRA)	DNF	LAP	
	Raul Cançado (BRA)	DNF	LAP	
	Erik Mauricio Cabascango (ECU)	DNF	LAP	
	Jorge Luis Vargas (CHI)	DNF	LAP	
	José Alirio Contreras (VEN)	DNF	LAP	
	Carlos Galviz (VEN)	DNF	LAP	
	Vicente Wegener (CHI)	DNF	LAP	
	Juan Cotumba Coa (BOL)	DNF	LAP	
	Miguel Ubeto (VEN)	DNF	LAP	
	Ruiz Ceder (SUR)	DNF	LAP	
	Matías Médici (ARG)	DNF		
	Tiago Fiorilli (BRA)	DNF		
	Joreg Giacinti (ARG)	DNF		
	Ignacio Pereyra (ARG)	DNF		
	José Carlos Guzman (ECU)	DNF		
	Juan Pablo Romero (PAR)	DNF		
	Gonzalo Andrés Zenteno (CHI)	DNF		
	Gerardo Fernández (ARG)	DNF		
	Mauricio Knapp (BRA)	DNF		
	Victor Hugo Tarqui (BRA)	DNF		
	Luiz Tavares (BRA)	DNF		
	Magno Nazaret (BRA)	DNF		
	Carlos Eduardo Quishpe (ECU)	DNF		
	Roman Mastrangelo (ARG)	DNF		
	Edgardo Simón (ARG)	DNS		
