= 2007 Vuelta al Táchira =

The 2007 Vuelta al Táchira was held from 7 to 21 January 2007 in Venezuela. It was a multiple stage road cycling race that took part over seven stages with a total of over 1600 kilometres.

Colombian Hernán Buenahora edged his Gobernación del Zulia – Alcaldía de Cabimas teammate and defending champion Manuel Medina. Medina won the mountains classification and Venezuelan Jackson Rodríguez of Loteria Del Táchira-Banfoandes captured the points classification.

== Men's stage summary ==
| Stage | Date | Start | Finish | Distance | Stage Top 3 |
|---|---|---|---|---|---|
| 1 | 7 January | Barquisimeto | Barquisimeto | 121.6 km | (Italy) Alberto Loddo (Venezuela) Artur García Rincón (Venezuela) Jackson Rodríguez |
| 2 | 8 January | Guanare | Santuario de la Virgen de Coromoto | 48.6 km | Lotería Tàchira-Banfoandes; Gobernación del Zulia – Alcaldía de Cabimas; Serramenti PVC Diquigiovanni-Selle Italia |
| 3 | 9 January | Barinas | Barinas | 141 km | (Venezuela) Juan Murillo (Venezuela) Anthony Brea (Colombia) José Contreras |
| 4 | 10 January | Ejido | La Azulita | 112.5 km | (Colombia) Hernán Buenahora (Venezuela) Manuel Medina (Venezuela) Jackson Rodríguez |
| 5 | 11 January | La Azulita | Bailadores | 120.3 km | (Colombia) José Serpa (Venezuela) Manuel Medina (Colombia) Hernán Buenahora |
| 6 | 12 January | El Vigia | La Grita | 184.6 km | (Venezuela) Manuel Medina (Colombia) Hernán Buenahora (Colombia) José Serpa |
| 7 | 13 January | Seboruco | Cerro de El Cristo Rey | 128.8 km | (Venezuela) Freddy Vargas (Venezuela) Ronald Gonzalez (Venezuela) Luis Diaz |
| 8 | 14 January | San Cristóbal | San Cristóbal | | (Venezuela) Manuel Medina (Venezuela) Jackson Rodríguez (Venezuela) Juan Murillo |
| 9 | 16 January | Tariba | Pregonero | 188 km | (Colombia) Francisco Colorado (Venezuela) Jackson Rodríguez (Venezuela) Manuel Medina |
| 10 | 17 January | Pregonero | San Antonio del Táchira | 229.4 km | (Colombia) Walter Pedraza (Venezuela) Jackson Rodríguez (Venezuela) Freddy Vargas |
| 11 | 18 January | Cordero | El Cobre | 145 km | (Colombia) César Salazar (Venezuela) Manuel Medina (Venezuela) Carlos Maya |
| 12 | 19 January | San Jose Bolivar | Queniquea | 12.3 km | (Colombia) Hernán Buenahora (Venezuela) José Chacón Díaz (Venezuela) Manuel Medina |
| 13 | 20 January | Rubio | Cordero | 156.7 km | (Cuba) Arnold Alcolea (Colombia) Elder Herrera (Venezuela) José Chacón Díaz |
| 14 | 21 January | El Pinal | San Cristóbal | | (Colombia) César Salazar (Venezuela) Jackson Rodríguez (Venezuela) Manuel Medina |

=== Men's top 10 overall ===
| Pos | Rider | Time |
|---|---|---|
| 1 | (Colombia) Hernán Buenahora | 46:43.33 |
| 2 | (Venezuela) Manuel Medina | + 1.13 |
| 3 | (Venezuela) Jackson Rodríguez | + 2.49 |
| 4 | (Venezuela) Carlos Maya | + 3.39 |
| 5 | (Colombia) Carlos Becerra | + 5.09 |
| 6 | (Venezuela) Yeison Delgado | + 7.21 |
| 7 | (Venezuela) César Salazar | + 8.25 |
| 8 | (Colombia) José Castelblanco | + 9.38 |
| 9 | (Venezuela) José Chacón Díaz | + 12.39 |
| 10 | (Colombia) Francisco Colorado | + 16.07 |
