= 2010 Vuelta al Táchira =

2009–10 UCI America Tour

Race details
- Dates: January 13 – January 24
- Stages: 12
- Distance: 1,435 km (892 mi)
- Winning time: 36h 42' 10"

Results
Jersey awarded to the overall winner	Winner	José Rujano (VEN)	(Gobernacion Del Zulia)
	Second	José Alarcón (VEN)	(Sumiglov Gob Merida Sta. Cruz Mora)
	Third	Noel Vazquez (VEN)	(Lotería del Táchira)
	Points	José Alarcón (VEN)	(Sumiglov Gob Merida Sta. Cruz Mora)
	Mountains	José Rujano (VEN)	(Gobernacion Del Zulia)
	Combination	José Alarcón (VEN)	(Sumiglov Gob Merida Sta. Cruz Mora)
	Sprints	Arthur Garcia (VEN)	(Kino Táchira)
	Team	(Venezuela) Lotería del Táchira	

The 2010 Vuelta al Táchira began on January 13 and ended on January 24. This was the 45th edition of the Vuelta al Táchira.

== Stages ==
Stage	Date	Start	Finish	Distance	Stage Top 3
1 (TTT)	13 January	San Cristóbal	San Cristóbal	15 km	Gob Carabobo Trasporte Eliang Plastipack (VEN); Lotería del Táchira (VEN); Gobernacion Del Zulia (VEN)
2	14 January	Táriba	Santa Barbara de Barinas	160 km	Miguel Ubeto (VEN); Gil Cordovez (VEN); Julio Herrera (VEN)
3	15 January	Abejales	Guasdualito	150 km	Gil Cordovez (VEN); Miguel Ubeto (VEN); Wilmer Bravo (VEN)
4	16 January	El Cantón	Cordero	160 km	José Alarcón (VEN); José Alirio Contreras (VEN); Yosvangs Rojas (VEN)
5	17 January	Palmira	El Vigía	140 km	Miguel Ubeto (VEN); Jonathan Monsalve (VEN); Arthur Garcia (VEN)
6	18 January	Umuquena	La Grita	107 km	Jhonathan Camargo (VEN); José Alarcón (VEN); José Alirio Contreras (VEN)
7	19 January	Seboruco	San Juan de Colon	110 km	Jonathan Monsalve (VEN); José Alirio Contreras (VEN); Rónald González (VEN)
8 (ITT)	20 January	Rubio-Bramon, Concafe	Rubio-Bramon, Concafe	15 km	José Rujano (VEN); Carlos Gálviz (VEN); Tomás Gil (VEN)
9	21 January	San Josecito	Pregonero	168 km	José Alarcón (VEN); Jhonathan Camargo (VEN); Noel Vazquez (VEN)
10	22 January	Pregonero	Santa Ana del Táchira	175 km	Jhon Navas (VEN); Freddy Vargas (VEN); José Alarcón (VEN)
11	23 January	San Antonio del Táchira	Cerro del Cristo	120 km	Jimmy Briceño (VEN); Jhonathan Camargo (VEN); Noel Vazquez (VEN)
12	24 January	San Cristóbal	San Cristóbal	115 km	José Alarcón (VEN); Miguel Ubeto (VEN); José Alirio Contreras (VEN)

== Final classification ==
Rank	Name	Team	Time
1.	José Rujano (VEN)	Gobernacion Del Zulia	36h 42' 10"
2.	José Alarcón (VEN)	Sumiglov Gob Merida Sta. Cruz Mora	+ 3"
3.	Noel Vazquez (VEN)	Lotería del Táchira	+ 27"
4.	Jhonathan Camargo (VEN)	Kino Táchira	+ 39"
5.	Carlos Becerra (VEN)	Lotería del Táchira	+ 2' 56"
6.	José Alirio Contreras (VEN)	Lotería del Táchira	+ 4' 13"
7.	Carlos Gálviz (VEN)	Gobernacion Del Zulia	+ 4' 39"
8.	Jonathan Monsalve (VEN)	Gs.Mastromarco Sensi Mapooro Hussein Sport	+ 6' 15"
9.	Freddy Vargas (VEN)	Lotería del Táchira	+ 7' 13"
10.	Humberlino Mesa (COL)	Boyacá Orgullo de America	+ 7' 18"
