= 2001 Vuelta a Venezuela =

Race details
- Dates: September 26 – October 7
- Stages: 13
- Distance: 1,833.8 km (1,139 mi)
- Winning time: 43h 34' 38"

Results
Jersey awarded to the overall winner	Winner	José Chacón Díaz (VEN)	(Loteria del Táchira)
	Second	Libardo Niño (COL)	(Loto Fortuna Barinas)
	Third	Jairo Pérez (COL)	(Gobernacíon Zulia)
	Points	Gil Cordovés (CUB)	(Indeportes Merida)
	Mountains	Isaac Ramírez (VEN)	(Loteria del Táchira)
	Youth	Pavel Brutt (RUS)	(Russia-Itera)
	Sprints	Mario Figueroa (VEN)	(Gobernacíon Zulia)
	Team	Loteria del Táchira B	

The 38th edition of the annual Vuelta a Venezuela was held from September 26 to October 7, 2002. The stage race started in Maturín, and ended in Caracas. Stage 1 was cancelled.

== Stages ==
=== 2001-09-25 ===
- Stage 1 was cancelled

=== 2001-09-26: Maturín — Carúpano (182.5 km) ===
Place	Stage 2		General Classification	
Place	Name	Time	Name	Time
1.	Gil Cordovés (CUB)	04:33.05	Gil Cordovés (CUB)	04:32.57
2.	Tony Linarez (VEN)	—	Tony Linarez (VEN)	+0.02
3.	Frederick Segura (VEN)	—	Frederick Segura (VEN)	+0.03

=== 2001-09-27: Carúpano Circuit Race (126 km) ===
Place	Stage 3		General Classification	
Place	Name	Time	Name	Time
1.	Gil Cordovés (CUB)	03:06.12	Gil Cordovés (CUB)	07:39.01
2.	Tony Linarez (VEN)	—	Tony Linarez (VEN)	+0.04
3.	Paulo Vargas (CRC)	—	Frederick Segura (VEN)	+0.11

=== 2001-09-28: Cariaco — Puerto la Cruz (160 km) ===
Place	Stage 4		General Classification	
Place	Name	Time	Name	Time
1.	Arlex Méndez (VEN)	03:48.34	Tony Linarez (VEN)	11:27.39
2.	John Nava (VEN)	—	John Nava (VEN)	+0.03
3.	Paulo Vargas (CRC)	—	Arlex Méndez (VEN)	+0.04

=== 2001-09-29: Puerto Píritu — Valle de la Pascua (179.2 km) ===
Place	Stage 5		General Classification	
Place	Name	Time	Name	Time
1.	Tommy Alcedo (VEN)	04:05.47	Tony Linarez (VEN)	15:33.26
2.	Hussein Monsalve (VEN)	—	Tommy Alcedo (VEN)	+0.01
3.	Pavel Brutt (RUS)	—	Arlex Méndez (VEN)	+0.04

=== 2001-09-30: Calabozo Circuit Race (121.5 km) ===
Place	Stage 6		General Classification	
Place	Name	Time	Name	Time
1.	Jairo Pérez (COL)	02:49.18	Hussein Monsalve (VEN)	18:22.43
2.	Hussein Monsalve (VEN)	—	Jairo Pérez (COL)	+0.02
3.	José Chacón Díaz (VEN)	—	José Chacón Díaz (VEN)	+0.03

=== 2001-10-01: Calabozo — San Juan de los Morros (136 km) ===
Place	Stage 7		General Classification	
Place	Name	Time	Name	Time
1.	Tommy Alcedo (VEN)	02:56.42	José Chacón Díaz (VEN)	21:19.26
2.	José Chacón Díaz (VEN)	+0.04	Hussein Monsalve (VEN)	+0.03
3.	Dixon Carmona (VEN)	—	Jairo Pérez (COL)	+0.05

=== 2001-10-02: San Juan de los Morros — San Carlos (200 km) ===
Place	Stage 8		General Classification	
Place	Name	Time	Name	Time
1.	Gil Cordovés (CUB)	04:23.23	José Chacón Díaz (VEN)	25:42.49
2.	Tony Linarez (VEN)	—	Hussein Monsalve (VEN)	+0.03
3.	Frederick Segura (VEN)	—	Jairo Pérez (COL)	+0.05

=== 2001-10-03: San Carlos — San Felipe (236 km) ===
Place	Stage 9		General Classification	
Place	Name	Time	Name	Time
1.	José Chacón Díaz (VEN)	05:25.50	José Chacón Díaz (VEN)	31:08.31
2.	Álvaro Lozano (COL)	—	Hussein Monsalve (VEN)	+0.11
3.	Gregorio Ladino (VEN)	—	Jairo Pérez (COL)	+0.13

=== 2001-10-04: Guama — Guama (22.7 km) ===
Place	Stage 10-A (Individual Time Trial)		General Classification	
Place	Name	Time	Name	Time
1.	José Chacón Díaz (VEN)	00:29.25	José Chacón Díaz (VEN)	31:37.56
2.	Libardo Niño (COL)	+0.08	Libardo Niño (COL)	+0.32
3.	Tommy Alcedo (VEN)	+0.36	Jairo Pérez (COL)	+0.56

=== 2001-10-04: San Felipe Circuit Race (92 km) ===
Place	Stage 10-B		General Classification	
Place	Name	Time	Name	Time
1.	Gil Cordovés (CUB)	02:10.04	José Chacón Díaz (VEN)	33:48.00
2.	Tony Linarez (VEN)	—	Libardo Niño (COL)	+0.32
3.	Miguel Ubeto (VEN)	—	Jairo Pérez (COL)	+0.56

=== 2001-10-05: San Felipe — Valencia (140.9 km) ===
Place	Stage 11		General Classification	
Place	Name	Time	Name	Time
1.	Pavel Brutt (RUS)	03:20.35	José Chacón Díaz (VEN)	37:08.35
2.	Franklin Chacón (VEN)	—	Libardo Niño (COL)	+0.32
3.	Robinson Merchán (VEN)	—	Jairo Pérez (COL)	+0.56

=== 2001-10-06: Valencia — Ocumare del Tuy (138 km) ===
Place	Stage 12		General Classification	
Place	Name	Time	Name	Time
1.	Raúl Montaña (COL)	04:15.25	José Chacón Díaz (VEN)	41:24.00
2.	Hussein Monsalve (VEN)	—	Libardo Niño (COL)	+0.32
3.	Israel Ochoa (COL)	—	Jairo Pérez (COL)	+0.56

=== 2001-10-07: Caracas Circuit Race (99 km) ===
Place	Stage 13		General Classification	
Place	Name	Time	Name	Time
1.	Gil Cordovés (CUB)	02:10.38	José Chacón Díaz (VEN)	43:34.38
2.	Tony Linarez (VEN)	—	Libardo Niño (COL)	+0.32
3.	Miguel Ubeto (VEN)	—	Jairo Pérez (COL)	+0.56

== Final classification ==
RANK	NAME	TEAM	TIME
1.	José Chacón Díaz (VEN)	Loteria del Táchira A	43:34:38
2.	Libardo Niño (COL)	Loto Fortuna Barinas A	+ 0.32
3.	Jairo Pérez (COL)	Gobernacíon Zulia Alcaldia	+ 0.56
4.	Federico Muñoz (COL)	Triple Gordo Trujillo A	+ 2.08
5.	Hussein Monsalve (VEN)	Distribuidora La Japonesa Lotería de Oriente	+ 2.16
6.	Gregorio Ladino (COL)	Gobernacíon del Zulía Alcaldia	+ 2.17
7.	Luis Espinosa (COL)	Triple Gordo Trujillo B	+ 2.20
8.	Raúl Montaña (COL)	Triple Gordo Trujillo B	+ 2.28
9.	Pavel Brutt (RUS)	Russia-Itera	+ 2.42
10.	Arlex Méndez (VEN)	Loteria del Táchira A	+ 2.43
