= 2008 Vuelta a Venezuela =

2007–08 UCI America Tour

Race details
- Dates: August 25 – September 7
- Stages: 14
- Distance: 1,977.1 km (1,229 mi)
- Winning time: 46h 24' 46"

Results
Jersey awarded to the overall winner	Winner	Carlos José Ochoa (VEN)	(Diguigiovanni Androni)
	Second	Franklin Chacón (VEN)	(Gobernacíon del Zulía)
	Third	Freddy Vargas (VEN)	(Loteria del Tachirá)
	Points	Franklin Chacón (VEN)	(Gobernacíon del Zulía)
	Mountains	Manuel Medina (VEN)	(Gobernacíon del Zulía)
	Sprints	Gil Cordovés (CUB)	(Alcaldia de Cabimas)
	Team	Lotería del Táchira	

The 45th edition of the annual Vuelta a Venezuela was held from August 25 to September 7, 2008. The stage race started in Maracaibo, and ended in Caracas.

== Stages ==
=== 2008-08-25: Maracaibo — Maracaibo (80 km) ===
Place	Stage 1		General Classification	
Place	Name	Time	Name	Time
1.	Artur García (VEN)	01:45.59	Artur García (VEN)	01:44.59
2.	Manuel Belletti (ITA)	—	Gil Cordovés (CUB)	+0.03
3.	Gil Cordovés (CUB)	—	Manuel Belletti (ITA)	+0.04

=== 2008-08-26: Cabimas — Valera (188.6 km) ===
Place	Stage 2		General Classification	
Place	Name	Time	Name	Time
1.	Jackson Rodríguez (VEN)	04:35.00	Artur García (VEN)	06:19.53
2.	Artur García (VEN)	—	Jackson Rodríguez (VEN)	+0.06
3.	Manuel Medina (VEN)	—	Manuel Belletti (ITA)	+0.10

=== 2008-08-27: Caja Seca — Mérida (183.2 km) ===
Place	Stage 3		General Classification	
Place	Name	Time	Name	Time
1.	Rolando Trujillo (VEN)	04:38.34	Rolando Trujillo (VEN)	10:58.33
2.	Richard Ochoa (VEN)	+0.01	Franklin Chacón (VEN)	+0.07
3.	Franklin Chacón (VEN)	—	Freddy Vargas (VEN)	+0.11

=== 2008-08-28: Mucuchies — Guanare (172.6 km) ===
Place	Stage 4		General Classification	
Place	Name	Time	Name	Time
1.	Franklin Chacón (VEN)	04:27.50	Franklin Chacón (VEN)	15:26.15
2.	Jackson Rodríguez (VEN)	—	Freddy Vargas (VEN)	+0.17
3.	Yonathan Monsalve (VEN)	—	Jackson Rodríguez (VEN)	+0.48

=== 2008-08-29: Ospino — Nirgua San Vicente (217.6 km) ===
Place	Stage 5		General Classification	
Place	Name	Time	Name	Time
1.	Carlos José Ochoa (VEN)	05:16.42	Franklin Chacón (VEN)	20:43.49
2.	Carlos Becerra (VEN)	+0.09	Carlos José Ochoa (VEN)	+0.02
3.	Manuel Medina (VEN)	+0.20	Manuel Medina (VEN)	+0.24

=== 2008-08-30: Valencia — Valencia (80 km) ===
Place	Stage 6		General Classification	
Place	Name	Time	Name	Time
1.	Gil Cordovés (CUB)	01:55.11	Franklin Chacón (VEN)	22:39.00
2.	Manuel Belletti (ITA)	—	Carlos José Ochoa (VEN)	+0.02
3.	Frederick Segura (VEN)	—	Manuel Medina (VEN)	+0.24

=== 2008-08-31: Puerto Cabello — San Juan de los Morros (139.6 km) ===
Place	Stage 7		General Classification	
Place	Name	Time	Name	Time
1.	Richard Ochoa (VEN)	03:47.54	Franklin Chacón (VEN)	26:26.50
2.	Honorio Machado (VEN)	—	Carlos José Ochoa (VEN)	+0.06
3.	Franklin Chacón (VEN)	—	Manuel Medina (VEN)	+0.28

=== 2008-09-01: Ortiz — Valle de la Pascua (161.4 km) ===
Place	Stage 8		General Classification	
Place	Name	Time	Name	Time
1.	Gil Cordovés (CUB)	03:51.18	Franklin Chacón (VEN)	30:18.08
2.	José Águilar (VEN)	—	Carlos José Ochoa (VEN)	+0.06
3.	Honorio Machado (VEN)	—	Manuel Medina (VEN)	+0.28

=== 2008-09-02: Las Mercedes del Llano — Chaguaramas (40 km) ===
Place	Stage 9 (Individual Time Trial)		General Classification	
Place	Name	Time	Name	Time
1.	José Serpa (COL)	00:37.24	Carlos José Ochoa (VEN)	30:57.08
2.	José Chacón Díaz (VEN)	+0.29	Franklin Chacón (VEN)	+0.17
3.	Carlos Galvis (VEN)	+0.49	Freddy Vargas (VEN)	+0.32

=== 2008-09-03: Valle de la Pascua — Pariaguan (159.1 km) ===
Place	Stage 10		General Classification	
Place	Name	Time	Name	Time
1.	Jesús Pérez (VEN)	04:04.48	Carlos José Ochoa (VEN)	35:01.56
2.	Anthony Brea (VEN)	—	Franklin Chacón (VEN)	+0.14
3.	Víctor Moreno (VEN)	—	Freddy Vargas (VEN)	+0.32

=== 2008-09-04: Cantaura — Cantaura (80 km) ===
Place	Stage 11		General Classification	
Place	Name	Time	Name	Time
1.	Honorio Machado (VEN)	01:58.28	Carlos José Ochoa (VEN)	37:00.24
2.	Anthony Brea (VEN)	—	Franklin Chacón (VEN)	+0.11
3.	Jackson Rodríguez (VEN)	—	Freddy Vargas (VEN)	+0.31

=== 2008-09-05: Cantaura — Barcelona (147.3 km) ===
Place	Stage 12		General Classification	
Place	Name	Time	Name	Time
1.	Frederick Segura (VEN)	03:14.28	Carlos José Ochoa (VEN)	40:14.52
2.	Honorio Machado (VEN)	—	Franklin Chacón (VEN)	+0.07
3.	Gil Cordovés (CUB)	—	Freddy Vargas (VEN)	+0.32

=== 2008-09-06: Piritu — Higuerote (231.8 km) ===
Place	Stage 13		General Classification	
Place	Name	Time	Name	Time
1.	Gil Cordovés (CUB)	04:24.00	Carlos José Ochoa (VEN)	44:38.52
2.	Frederick Segura (VEN)	—	Franklin Chacón (VEN)	+0.03
3.	Tomás Gil (VEN)	—	Freddy Vargas (VEN)	+0.23

=== 2008-09-07: Caracas — Caracas (80 km) ===
Place	Stage 14		General Classification	
Place	Name	Time	Name	Time
1.	Honorio Machado (VEN)	01:45.54	Carlos José Ochoa (VEN)	46:24.46
2.	Manuel Belletti (ITA)	—	Franklin Chacón (VEN)	+0.03
3.	José Serpa (COL)	—	Freddy Vargas (VEN)	+0.23

== Final standings ==
=== General Classification ===
RANK	NAME	TEAM	TIME
1.	Carlos José Ochoa (VEN)	Diguigiovanni Androni	46:24:46
2.	Franklin Chacón (VEN)	Gobernacíon del Zulía	+ 0.03
3.	Freddy Vargas (VEN)	Loteria del Táchira	+ 0.23
4.	José Alarcón (VEN)	Sumiglov-City of Mérida	+ 1.00
5.	José Chacón Díaz (VEN)	Loteria del Táchira	+ 1.07
6.	Manuel Medina (VEN)	Gobernacíon del Zulía	+ 1.50
7.	Eduin Becerra (VEN)	Sumiglov-City of Mérida	+ 1.57
8.	Jackson Rodríguez (VEN)	Diguigiovanni Androni	+ 2.08
9.	Juan Murillo (VEN)	Loteria del Táchira	+ 2.31
10.	Yonathan Monsalve (VEN)	Hussein Sport Gobierno	+ 3.53

=== Points Classification ===
RANK	NAME	TEAM	POINTS
1.	Franklin Chacón (VEN)	Gobernacíon del Zulía	165
2.	Gil Cordovés (CUB)	Alcaldia de Cabimas	156
3.	Jackson Rodríguez (VEN)	Diguigiovanni Androni	151

=== Mountains Classification ===
RANK	NAME	TEAM	POINTS
1.	Manuel Medina (VEN)	Gobernacíon del Zulía	15
2.	Richard Ochoa (VEN)	Diguigiovanni Androni	13
3.	Rolando Trujillo (COL)	Trecolli Bono del Ciclismo Colombia	11

=== Sprints Classification ===
RANK	NAME	TEAM	POINTS
1.	Gil Cordovés (CUB)	Alcaldia de Cabimas	33
2.	Wilmen Bravo (VEN)	Alcaldia Bolivariana de Paez Apure	27
3.	Franklin Chacón (VEN)	Gobernacíon del Zulía	20

=== Stage Points Classification ===
RANK	NAME	TEAM	POINTS
1.	Honorio Machado (COL)	Gobernacíon de Lara Alcaldia de Jimenez	78
2.	Franklin Chacón (VEN)	Gobernacíon del Zulía	75
3.	Gil Cordovés (CUB)	Alcaldia de Cabimas	68
