= Jesús Pérez (cyclist) =

Venezuelan racing cyclist

Personal information
- Full name: Jesús María Pérez Silva
- Born: 15 July 1984 (age 42) Lara, Venezuela

Cycling career
- Sport: Cycling
- Current team: Retired
- Discipline: Road
- Role: Rider

Professional team
- 2007–2008: Cinelli–OPD–Endeka

Jesús María Pérez Silva (born 15 July 1984) is a former Venezuelan professional track and road racing cyclist.

== Major results ==
2003
1st Stage 11 Vuelta a Venezuela
2004
9th Road race, Pan American Under-23 Road Championships
2005
1st Stage 4 Vuelta Ciclista Aragua
Vuelta a Yacambu-Lara

1st Stages 1, 2b & 6

1st Stage 2 Vuelta a Venezuela
Vuelta a Sucre

1st Stages 1 & 2

1st Stage 2 Vuelta al Estado Zulia
2006
Vuelta al Táchira

1st Stages 1 & 2

Vuelta al Estado Yaracuy

1st Stages 1, 4a & 5

1st Stage 4 Volta do Paraná
1st Stage 5 Vuelta a Sucre
2nd Overall Vuelta al Estado Zulia

1st Stages 1 & 3

2007
1st Stage 5 Vuelta a la Comunidad de Madrid
1st Stage 5 Vuelta a Venezuela
Vuelta al Estado Zulia

1st Stages 3 & 4a

2008
1st Overall GP Alto Apure
1st Stage 6b Tour du Maroc
1st Stage 10 Vuelta a Venezuela
1st Stage 6 Vuelta al Estado Zulia
2009
Clásica San Eleuterio Barinitas

1st Stages 1 & 3

Vuelta a Venezuela

1st Stages 5 & 12

1st Stage 1b Vuelta a Lara
2nd Road race, National Road Championships
2010
1st Apertura Temporada de Quibor
Vuelta a Venezuela

1st Stages 9 & 12

2nd Clasico Corre Por La Vida
3rd Overall Vuelta al Oriente

1st Stage 2

3rd Overall Vuelta al Estado Zulia

1st Stage 6

2011
2nd Overall Vuelta al Estado Zulia

1st Stage 2

2nd Clásico Ciudad de Anaco
2012
1st Clásica Virgen de Begoña
1st Stage 1 Vuelta Ciclista Aragua
1st Stage 2 Vuelta a Yacambu-Lara
2013
1st Stage 6 Vuelta a Barinitas
Vuelta a Venezuela

1st Stages 1, 5 & 10

2015
1st Stage 1 Vuelta a Venezuela
6th Copa Federación Venezolana de Ciclismo
2017
10th Road race, Pan American Road Championships
