= Artur García =

Venezuelan racing cyclist

Personal information
- Full name: Artur Albeiro García Rincón
- Born: 26 January 1984 (age 42) San Juan de Colón, Táchira, Venezuela

Cycling career
- Sport: Cycling
- Discipline: Road
- Role: Rider

Amateur teams
- 2008–2010: Lotería del Táchira
- 2011: Kino Tachira Sporade
- 2013–2015: Lotería del Táchira
- 2017–2018: Banco Bicentenario–Gobierno de Yaracuy
- 2018: Gobernación de Miranda–Trek
Medal record
Men's road cycling
Representing Venezuela
Central American and Caribbean Games
Bronze medal – third place	2006 Cartagena	Road Race

Artur Albeiro García Rincón (born 26 January 1984 in San Juan de Colón, Táchira) is a Venezuelan racing cyclist.

== Major results ==
2004
10th Overall Vuelta a Venezuela

1st Stages 10 & 12

2005
1st Clásica de la Consolación
1st Stage 5 Vuelta a Cuba
2nd Overall Vuelta a Venezuela
2006
1st Stage 6 Vuelta Ciclista de Chile
1st Stage 5 Vuelta Internacional al Estado Trujillo
1st Stage 4 Vuelta al Oriente
3rd Road race, Central American and Caribbean Games
3rd Road race, South American Games
2007
1st Stage 2 Clásico Ciclístico Banfoandes
2008
Vuelta a Colombia

1st Sprints classification
1st Stages 1 & 14

1st Stage 1 Vuelta al Táchira
1st Stage 1 Vuelta a Venezuela
1st Stage 9 Clásico Ciclístico Banfoandes
2009
Vuelta al Táchira

1st Stages 2 & 5

1st Stage 6 Vuelta a Colombia
3rd Road race, National Road Championships
2010
1st Stage 3 Vuelta a Venezuela
1st Stage 1 Vuelta a Guatemala
2011
1st Stage 6 Vuelta al Táchira
2012
2nd Overall Vuelta a Venezuela

1st Stage 2

2013
Vuelta a Bolivia

1st Stages 5 & 10b

2015
1st Stage 1 Vuelta al Táchira
2017
6th Overall Vuelta a Venezuela

1st Stage 7

2018
1st Stage 7 Vuelta del Uruguay
2nd Road race, National Road Championships
