= Francisco Colorado =

Colombian racing cyclist

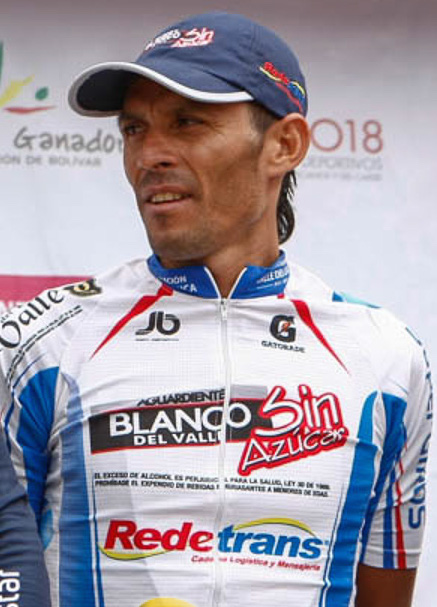
- Colorado in 2014

Personal information
- Full name: Francisco Jarley Colorado Hernández
- Born: May 13, 1980 (age 46) San Rafael, Antioquia, Colombia

Cycling career
- Sport: Cycling
- Discipline: Road
- Role: Rider
- Rider type: All-rounder

Amateur teams
- 2014–2015: Canels Turbo
- 2019: Team Saitel Ecuador

Professional teams
- 2006: Colombia es Pasión
- 2010–2012: EPM–UNE
- 2015: Ningxia Sports Lottery–Focus Cycling Team
- 2016: RTS–Santic Racing Team
- 2017–2018: Ningxia Sports Lottery–Livall Cycling Team

Francisco Jarley Colorado Hernández (born May 13, 1980, in San Rafael, Antioquia) is a Colombian road racing cyclist, who last rode for the Ecuadorian amateur team, Team Saitel Ecuador.

== Major results ==
2005
10th Overall Clásico Ciclístico Banfoandes
2006
1st Stage 8 Vuelta Ciclista a Costa Rica
3rd Overall Vuelta a El Salvador
4th Overall Vuelta al Táchira
10th Overall Tour de Beauce

1st Mountains classification

2007
2nd Overall Vuelta Ciclista a Costa Rica

1st Stage 12

5th Overall Vuelta a Venezuela

1st Stage 10

10th Overall Vuelta al Táchira

1st Stage 9

2008
10th Overall Vuelta a Colombia
2009
9th Overall Vuelta a Colombia

1st Prologue

2010
3rd Overall Vuelta a Guatemala
4th Overall Vuelta a Colombia
5th Overall Vuelta a Cuba
2012
1st Most Aggressive USA Pro Cycling Challenge
10th Overall Vuelta a la Comunidad de Madrid
2013
10th Overall Vuelta a Guatemala
2014
2nd Overall Vuelta a Guatemala

1st Stage 6

2015
1st Overall Vuelta Mexico Telmex
3rd Overall Tour of Qinghai Lake

1st Mountains classification

2017
5th Overall Tour of Fuzhou
9th Overall Tour of Almaty
10th Overall Tour of Xingtai
