= 2007 Vuelta a Venezuela =

2006–2007 UCI America Tour

Race details
- Dates: August 27 – September 9
- Stages: 14
- Distance: 2,180 km (1,355 mi)
- Winning time: 49h 24' 11"

Results
Jersey awarded to the overall winner	Winner	César Salazar (COL)	(Lotería del Táchira)
	Second	Richard Ochoa (VEN)	(Gobernación Bolivariano)
	Third	Tomás Gil (VEN)	(Gobernación Bolivariano)
	Points	Gil Cordovés (CUB)	(Alcaldía de Cabimas)
	Mountains	César Salazar (COL)	(Lotería del Táchira)
	Youth	Jimmy Briceño (VEN)	(Gobernación Barinas)
	Sprints	Gil Cordovés (CUB)	(Alcaldia de Cabimas)
	Team	Lotería del Táchira	

The 2007 Vuelta a Venezuela was held from August 27 to September 9, 2007. The 44th annual edition of the stage race started with an Individual Time Trial (18.8 km) in Carúpano, and ended in Caracas.

== Stages ==
=== 2007-08-27: Carupano — Rio Caribe (18.8 km) ===
Place	Stage 1-A (Individual Time Trial)		General Classification	
Place	Name	Time	Name	Time
1.	Juan Pablo Dotti (ARG)	00:25.38	Juan Pablo Dotti (ARG)	00:25.36
2.	Freddy Vargas (VEN)	+0.11	Freddy Vargas (VEN)	+0.11
3.	Andris Hernández (VEN)	+0.28	Andris Hernández (VEN)	+0.28

=== 2007-08-27: Carupano Circuito (76.8 km) ===
Place	Stage 1-B		General Classification	
Place	Name	Time	Name	Time
1.	Gil Cordovés (CUB)	01:50.09	Juan Pablo Dotti (ARG)	02:15.45
2.	Jesús Pérez (VEN)	—	Freddy Vargas (VEN)	+0.11
3.	Edgardo Simón (ARG)	—	Andris Hernández (VEN)	+0.28

=== 2007-08-28: Casanay — Santa Barbara de Tapirin (187.5 km) ===
Place	Stage 2		General Classification	
Place	Name	Time	Name	Time
1.	Miguel Ubeto (VEN)	04:51.02	Juan Pablo Dotti (ARG)	07:07.00
2.	Ivan Fanelli (ITA)	+0.13	Freddy Vargas (VEN)	+0.11
3.	Juan Murillo (VEN)	—	Andris Hernández (VEN)	+0.28

=== 2007-08-29: Maturín Circuito (44.8 km) ===
Place	Stage 3		General Classification	
Place	Name	Time	Name	Time
1.	Gil Cordovés (CUB)	01:00.09	Juan Pablo Dotti (ARG)	08:07.09
2.	Miguel Chacón (VEN)	—	Freddy Vargas (VEN)	+0.11
3.	Jesús Pérez (VEN)	—	Andris Hernández (VEN)	+0.28

=== 2007-08-30: Santa Barbara de Tapirin — Cantaura (142.8 km) ===
Place	Stage 4		General Classification	
Place	Name	Time	Name	Time
1.	Wilmen Bravo (VEN)	03:10.26	Juan Pablo Dotti (ARG)	11:17.35
2.	Edgardo Simón (ARG)	—	Freddy Vargas (VEN)	+0.11
3.	Elder Herrera (COL)	—	Andris Hernández (VEN)	+0.28

=== 2007-08-31: Pariaguan — Valle de la Pascua (220.6 km) ===
Place	Stage 5		General Classification	
Place	Name	Time	Name	Time
1.	Jesús Pérez (VEN)	04:11.50	Juan Pablo Dotti (ARG)	15:29.25
2.	Edgardo Simón (ARG)	—	Freddy Vargas (VEN)	+0.11
3.	Gil Cordovés (CUB)	—	Andris Hernández (VEN)	+0.28

=== 2007-09-01: San José Tiznado — Acarigua (216.2 km) ===
Place	Stage 6		General Classification	
Place	Name	Time	Name	Time
1.	Emiliano Donadello (ITA)	05:10.52	Juan Pablo Dotti (ARG)	20:40.17
2.	Julio Herrera (VEN)	—	Freddy Vargas (VEN)	+0.11
3.	Arturo Corvalán (CHI)	—	Andris Hernández (VEN)	+0.28

=== 2007-09-02: Acarigua Circuito (76.8 km) ===
Place	Stage 7		General Classification	
Place	Name	Time	Name	Time
1.	Gil Cordovés (CUB)	01:45.41	Juan Pablo Dotti (ARG)	22:25.58
2.	Jesús Pérez (VEN)	—	Freddy Vargas (VEN)	+0.11
3.	Frederick Segura (VEN)	—	Andris Hernández (VEN)	+0.28

=== 2007-09-03: Ospina — Barinas Circuito (180.1 km) ===
Place	Stage 8		General Classification	
Place	Name	Time	Name	Time
1.	Frederick Segura (VEN)	03:10.57	Juan Pablo Dotti (ARG)	25:36.55
2.	Gil Cordovés (CUB)	—	Freddy Vargas (VEN)	+0.11
3.	Edgardo Simón (ARG)	—	Andris Hernández (VEN)	+0.28

=== 2007-09-04: Santa Bárbara de Barinas — San Cristóbal (162.3 km) ===
Place	Stage 9		General Classification	
Place	Name	Time	Name	Time
1.	José Chacón Díaz (VEN)	03:37.55	Freddy Vargas (VEN)	29:15.05
2.	Francisco Colorado (COL)	—	Juan Pablo Dotti (ARG)	+0.02
3.	Juan Murillo (VEN)	+0.04	José Chacón Díaz (VEN)	+0.09

=== 2007-09-05: La Fría — Mérida (160.3 km) ===
Place	Stage 10		General Classification	
Place	Name	Time	Name	Time
1.	Francisco Colorado (COL)	03:37.55	Francisco Colorado (COL)	33:25.18
2.	César Salazar (COL)	+0.15	César Salazar (COL)	+0.11
3.	Carlos José Ochoa (VEN)	+0.32	José Chacón Díaz (VEN)	+0.45

=== 2007-09-06: Santa Elena de Arenales — Valera (170.6 km) ===
Place	Stage 11		General Classification	
Place	Name	Time	Name	Time
1.	Juan Pablo Dotti (ARG)	04:02.08	César Salazar (COL)	37:27.35
2.	Carlos José Ochoa (VEN)	—	Richard Ochoa (VEN)	+0.40
3.	César Salazar (COL)	+0.02	José Serpa (COL)	+0.56

=== 2007-09-07: La Libertad — San Felipe (220.9 km) ===
Place	Stage 12		General Classification	
Place	Name	Time	Name	Time
1.	Víctor Moreno (VEN)	05:36.24	César Salazar (COL)	43:04.43
2.	Joan Páez (VEN)	+0.01	Richard Ochoa (VEN)	+0.40
3.	Vicente Sanabria (CUB)	—	José Serpa (COL)	+0.56

=== 2007-09-08: San Pablo de Yaracuy — Maracay (189.2 km) ===
Place	Stage 13		General Classification	
Place	Name	Time	Name	Time
1.	Gil Cordovés (CUB)	04:35.20	César Salazar (COL)	47:40.03
2.	Jesús Pérez (VEN)	—	Richard Ochoa (VEN)	+0.40
3.	Anthony Brea (VEN)	—	José Serpa (COL)	+0.56

=== 2007-09-09: Caracas Circuito (80 km) ===
Place	Stage 14		General Classification	
Place	Name	Time	Name	Time
1.	Gil Cordovés (CUB)	01:43.57	César Salazar (COL)	49:24.11
2.	Jesús Pérez (VEN)	—	Richard Ochoa (VEN)	+0.39
3.	Julio Herrera (VEN)	—	Tomás Gil (VEN)	+0.44

== Final classification ==
RANK	NAME	TEAM	TIME
1.	César Salazar (COL)	Lotería del Táchira	49:24:11
2.	Richard Ochoa (VEN)	Gobernación Bolivariano Carabobo	+ 0.39
3.	Tomás Gil (VEN)	Gobernación Bolivariano Carabobo	+ 0.44
4.	José Serpa (COL)	Serramenti PVC Diquigiovanni	+ 0.53
5.	Francisco Colorado (COL)	Alcaldía Bolivariana Páez	+ 1.04
6.	Rónald González (VEN)	Lotería del Táchira	+ 1.13
7.	Juan Pablo Dotti (ARG)	Cinelli Endeka OPD	+ 1.26
8.	José Chacón Díaz (VEN)	Lotería del Táchira	+ 2.00
9.	Andris Hernández (VEN)	Gobernación Bolivariano Carabobo	+ 2.37
10.	Jimmy Briceño (VEN)	Fecez Eje. Gobernación Barinas	+ 2.50
