= Cycling at the 2010 South American Games – Men's road time trial =

The men's time trial event at the 2010 South American Games was held at 11:30 on March 17.

== Medalists ==
Gold	Silver	Bronze
Santiago Botero; Colombia	Matías Médici; Argentina	Fabio Duarte; Colombia

== Results ==
Rank	Rider	Time
1st place, gold medalist(s)	Santiago Botero (COL)	49:04.055
2nd place, silver medalist(s)	Matías Médici (ARG)	49:24.964
3rd place, bronze medalist(s)	Fabio Duarte (COL)	49:31.925
4	Carlos Ivan Guñez (CHI)	49:51.516
5	Tomás Gil (VEN)	50:52.441
6	Luiz Tavares (BRA)	51:18.704
7	Magno Nazaret (BRA)	51:54.390
8	José Alarcón (VEN)	52:41.229
9	Roman Mastrangelo (ARG)	52:42.941
10	Jorge Luis Vargas (CHI)	53:46.283
11	Óscar Soliz Vilca (BOL)	53:47.001
12	Ruiz Ceder (SUR)	1:01:08.332
