= Miguel Chacón =

Miguel Chacón may refer to:

- Miguel Chacón (Spanish cyclist) (1930–2011), Spanish racing cyclist
- Miguel Chacón (Venezuelan cyclist) (born 1983), Venezuelan road cyclist
