= 2009 Vuelta al Táchira =

(Venezuela) 2009 Vuelta al Táchira
2008–09 UCI America Tour

Race details
- Dates: January 6 – January 17
- Stages: 12
- Distance: 1,369.5 km (851.0 mi)
- Winning time: 34h 35' 25"

Results
Jersey awarded to the overall winner	Winner	Rónald González (VEN)	(Loteria del Tachirá)
	Second	Tomás Gil (VEN)	(Gobierno de Carabobo)
	Third	Jonathan Monsalve (VEN)	(Hussein Sport Gobierno)
	Points	Jonathan Monsalve (VEN)	(Hussein Sport Gobierno)
	Mountains	Manuel Medina (VEN)	(Gobernacíon del Zulía)
	Combination	Jonathan Monsalve (VEN)	(Hussein Sport Gobierno)
	Sprints	Víctor Moreno (VEN)	(Alcaldia de Maracaibo)
	Team	(Venezuela) Lotería del Táchira	

The 2009 Vuelta al Táchira is the 44th of the annual Vuelta al Táchira cycling competition. The race was held in San Cristóbal, Táchira from January 6 to January 17, 2009, on a 1,400-kilometre (870 mi) course.

== Final classification ==
RANK	NAME	TEAM	TIME
1.	Rónald González (VEN)	Loteria del Táchira	34:35.25
2.	Tomás Gil (VEN)	Gobierno de Carabobo Fundadeporte	+ 0.07
3.	Jonathan Monsalve (VEN)	Hussein Sport Gobierno Barinas	+ 0.33
4.	Juan Murillo (VEN)	Loteria del Táchira	+ 0.35
5.	Eduin Becerra (VEN)	Sumiglow Gobernacíon Mérida	+ 0.39
6.	Manuel Medina (VEN)	Gobernacíon del Zulía	+ 0.53
7.	José Chacón Díaz (VEN)	Loteria del Táchira	+ 1.46
8.	José Alarcón (VEN)	Sumiglow Gobernacíon Mérida	+ 1.58
9.	José Rujano (VEN)	Gobernacíon del Zulía	+ 2.08
10.	César Salazar (COL)	Loteria del Táchira	+ 2.36

== See also ==
- 2009 Vuelta a Venezuela
