= Manuel Medina (cyclist) =

Venezuelan racing cyclist

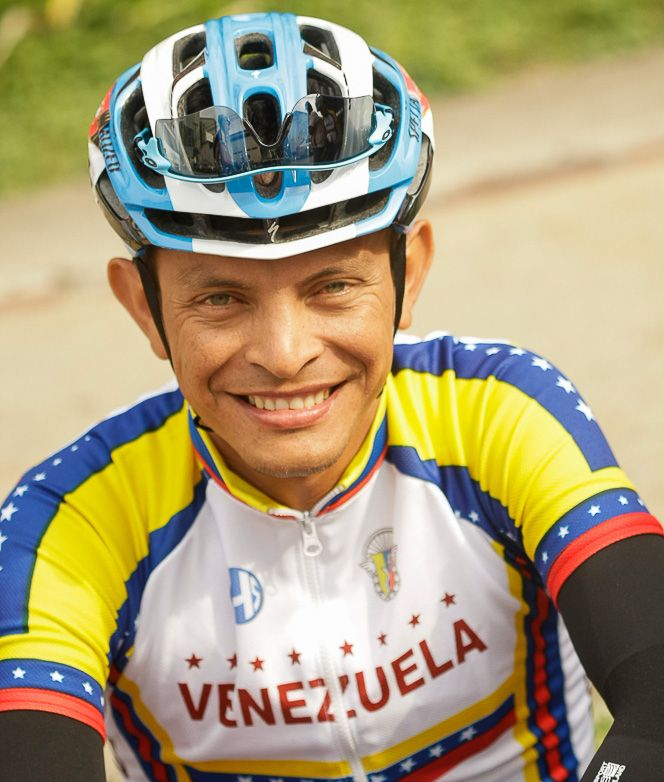
- Medina during the 2013 Vuelta a Guatemala.

Personal information
- Full name: Manuel Eduardo Medina Mariño
- Nickname: El Gato
- Born: 14 July 1976 (age 50) Aragua de Barcelona, Venezuela

Cycling career
- Sport: Cycling
- Current team: Team Atlético Venezuela
- Discipline: Road
- Role: Rider
- Rider type: Stage races

Amateur teams
- 2003–2013: Gobernación del Zulia
- 2015: Alcaldia de Mariño–Porlamar–Nueva Esparta
- 2016–2017: JHS Aves–Intac.Táchira
- 2017: Grupo JHS–Andiempaques
- 2018–2019: Deportivo Táchira
- 2020–: Team Atlético Venezuela
Medal record
Men's road bicycle racing
Representing Venezuela
Pan American Championships
Silver medal – second place	2007 Valencia	Road race

Manuel Eduardo Medina Mariño (born July 14, 1976) is a Venezuelan professional bicycle road racing cyclist and former Venezuelan national cycling champion. He was nicknamed "El Gato" during his career.

== Major results ==
1998
3rd Overall Vuelta a Venezuela
2002
3rd Time trial, National Road Championships
3rd Overall Vuelta a Venezuela

1st Stage 11

2003
10th Overall Vuelta a Venezuela

1st Mountains classification

2004
1st Stage 6 Vuelta al Táchira
2005
1st Overall Vuelta Ciclista Aragua

1st Stage 5

1st Stage 1 Vuelta a Colombia
1st Stage 3a Vuelta a Venezuela
2006
National Road Championships

1st Road race
3rd Time trial

1st Overall Vuelta al Táchira

1st Stages 5 & 13

1st Stage 5 Vuelta a Colombia
1st Stage 5 Clasico Ciclistico Banfoandes
5th Overall Vuelta a Venezuela

1st Stage 8

8th Central American and Caribbean Games – Road race
2007
1st Overall Vuelta al Oriente

1st Stage 5

1st Stages 3 & 7 Vuelta a Colombia
1st Stage 12 Vuelta a Guatemala
2nd Pan American Road Race Championships
2nd Overall Vuelta al Táchira

1st Stages 6 & 8

2nd Overall Vuelta a Yacambu-Lara

1st Stage 6

2nd Overall Clasico Pedro Infante
3rd Overall Vuelta a Bramon
2008
1st Overall Vuelta al Táchira

1st Stages 4, 6, 11 & 13

1st Overall Vuelta a Guatemala

1st Stages 3, 8 & 9

2nd Road race, National Road Championships
6th Overall Vuelta a Venezuela
2009
3rd Overall Vuelta a Cuba
6th Overall Vuelta al Táchira
2010
3rd Overall Vuelta a Venezuela
2011
1st Overall Vuelta al Táchira

1st Stage 5

1st Stage 9 Vuelta a Venezuela
2nd Overall Vuelta a la Independencia Nacional

1st Stage 5

2012
1st Mountains classification Vuelta a Venezuela
3rd Overall Vuelta al Táchira

1st Stage 9

2013
5th Overall Vuelta al Táchira

1st Mountains classification
1st Stages 8 & 9

2017
5th Overall Vuelta a Venezuela

1st Mountains classification

2019
10th Overall Vuelta al Táchira
