= Nicolas Reidtler =

Venezuelan cyclist

Personal information
- Born: 5 December 1947 (age 78)

Cycling career
- Sport: Cycling

Nicolas Reidtler (born 5 December 1947) is a Venezuelan former cyclist. He competed in the individual road race event at the 1976 Summer Olympics. He is a two-time winner of the Vuelta a Venezuela race.
