= 2004 Pan American Cycling Championships =

- Venue: El Baquiano Sport Complex, Venezuela
- Date(s): June 20, 2004
- Velodrome: El Baquiano

The 2004 Pan American Cycling Championships took place at the El Baquiano Velodrome, Cojedes, Venezuela from 20 to 27 June 2004.

== Medal summary ==
=== Road ===
==== Men ====
Event	Gold	Silver	Bronze
Individual road race	Manuel Guevara; Venezuela	Jorge Humberto Martínez; Colombia	Miguel Ubeto; Venezuela
Individual time trial	José Chacón Díaz; Venezuela	José Rujano; Venezuela	Domingo González; Mexico

==== Women ====
Event	Gold	Silver	Bronze
Individual road race	Yoanka González; Cuba	Yeilien Fernández; Cuba	Danielys García; Venezuela
Individual time trial	Paola Madriñán; Colombia	Marie Rosado; Puerto Rico	Yoanka González; Cuba

==== Under 23 Men ====
Event	Gold	Silver	Bronze
Individual road race	Jackson Rodríguez; Venezuela	Miguel Chacón; Venezuela	Juan Murillo; Venezuela
Individual time trial	Rafael Infantino; Colombia	Jimm Santos; Venezuela	Marco Ortega; Mexico

=== Track ===
==== Men ====
Event	Gold	Silver	Bronze
Sprint	Giddeon Massie; United States	Jonathan Marín; Colombia	Alexander Cornieles; Venezuela
1 km time trial	Christian Stahl; United States	Alexander Cornieles; Venezuela	Adam Duvendeck; United States
Keirin	Giddeon Massie; United States	Rubén Osorio; Venezuela	Leonardo Narváez; Colombia
Individual pursuit	Sebastián Cancio; Argentina	Tomás Gil; Venezuela	Fernando Antogna; Argentina
Scratch	Ángel Colla; Argentina	Gonzalo Miranda; Chile	Isaac Cañizalez; Venezuela
Points race	Richard Ochoa; Venezuela	Gonzalo Miranda; Chile	Sebastián Cancio; Argentina
Madison	Colombia; José Serpa; John Parra	Guatemala; Miguel Pérez; David Calanche	Chile; Enzo Cesario; José Aravena
Team pursuit	Colombia; José Serpa; Rafael Infantino; Juan Pablo Suárez; Andrés Rodríguez	Venezuela; Richard Ochoa; Tomás Gil; Isaac Cañizalez; Franklin Chacón	Chile; Enzo Cesario; José Aravena; Francisco Cesario; Gonzalo Miranda
Team sprint	Venezuela	United States; Giddeon Massie; Adam Duvendeck; Christian Stahl	Colombia

==== Women ====
Event	Gold	Silver	Bronze
Sprint	Tanya Lindemuth; United States	Yumari González; Cuba	Diana García; Colombia
500 m time trial	Tanya Lindenmuth; United States	Yumari González; Cuba	Diana García; Colombia
Keirin	Diana García; Colombia	Yumari González; Cuba	Tanya Lindenmuth; United States
Individual pursuit	Yoanka González; Cuba	Sarah Uhl; United States	Dayana Chirinos; Venezuela
Points race	Sandra Gómez; Colombia	Amelia Blanco; Dominican Republic	Dayana Chirinos; Venezuela
Scratch	Yumari González; Cuba	Dayana Chirinos; Venezuela	Paola Muñoz; Chile
