= José Rujano =

Venezuelan cyclist (born 1982)

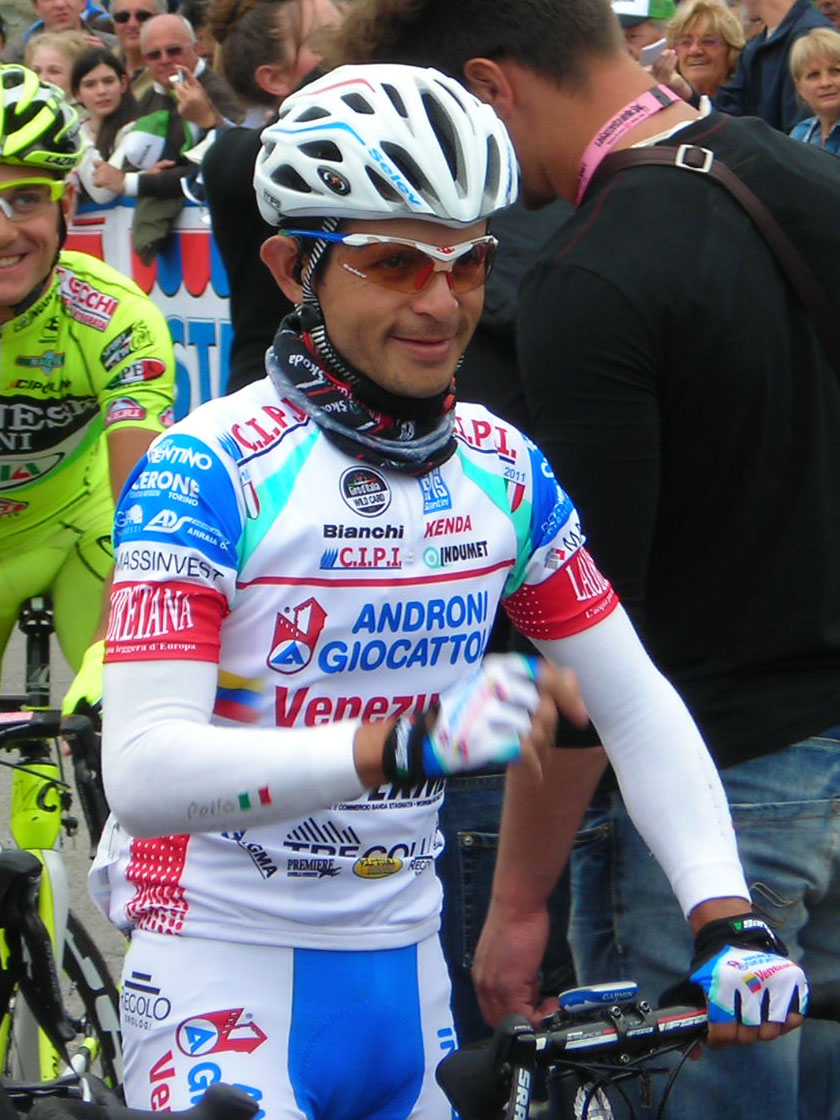
- Rujano at the 2012 Giro d'Italia.

Personal information
- Full name: José Humberto Rujano Guillen
- Nicknames: El Águila de Mérida, Jojo, The Coffee planter from Santa Cruz de Mora
- Born: 18 February 1982 (age 44) Santa Cruz de Mora, Venezuela
- Height: 1.62 m (5 ft 4 in)
- Weight: 48 kg (106 lb; 7 st 8 lb)

Cycling career
- Sport: Cycling
- Discipline: Road
- Role: Rider
- Rider type: Climbing specialist

Amateur teams
- 2009: Gobernación del Zulia
- 2010: Gobernación del Zulia
- 2014: Boyacá se Atreve
- 2015: Gobernación de Mérida
- 2015: Coordinadora–FundaRujano
- 2016: Multi Repuestos Bosa
- 2016–2017: Gobernación de Mérida
- 2019: Venezuela País de Futuro–Fina Arroz
- 2019: US Lamentinois
- 2021: Team Osorio Grupo Ciclismo

Professional teams
- 2003–2006: Colombia–Selle Italia
- 2006: Quick-Step–Innergetic
- 2007: Unibet.com
- 2008: Caisse d'Epargne
- 2010: ISD–NERI
- 2011–2012: Androni Giocattoli
- 2013: Vacansoleil–DCM

Major wins
- Grand Tours Giro d'Italia Mountains classification (2005) 3 individual stages (2005, 2011) Stage races Tour de Langkawi (2010) Vuelta a Colombia (2009) Vuelta al Táchira (2004, 2005, 2010, 2015) Vuelta a Venezuela (2009) One-day races and Classics National Time Trial Championships (2007, 2009, 2013)
Medal record
Men's road bicycle racing
Representing Venezuela
Pan American Championships
Silver medal – second place	2004 Cojedes	Time trial

José Humberto Rujano Guillen (born 18 February 1982) is a Venezuelan road bicycle racer who competed professionally between 2003 and 2013, and most recently competed for Venezuelan amateur team Osorio Grupo Ciclismo.

== Career ==
Born in Santa Cruz de Mora, Mérida, Rujano made his debut in the professional peloton in 2003 with the Colombia–Selle Italia team. In 2005 Rujano had his best year to date, finishing third in the Giro d'Italia and winning the mountains classification. In 2006 he left the Colombia-Selle Italia team for Quick Step and he moved to the Spanish ProTour team Caisse d'Epargne in 2008. His results were not up to the expectations of team leaders, who did not renew his contract at the end of the season. In 2010, Rujano joined the Italian Professional Continental team ISD-Neri. He was not selected for the Giro d'Italia, his main objective for the season, so he left the team in May and returned to Venezuela.

=== Androni Giocattoli (2011–12) ===
At the end of 2010, Rujano signed a contract for two years with the Italian team Androni Giocattoli, directed by Gianni Savio who said that he "believed in his talent" and wanted "to revive his career." Rujano was recruited at the same time as the Italian climber Emanuele Sella, Savio referring to giving these two riders a "last chance".

His main objective for 2011 was the Giro d'Italia, and especially its mountain stages. He lived up to his objectives since he prevailed on 2 mountain stages in the race: stage 9 from Messina to Etna after original winner Alberto Contador was removed from the rankings due to a doping affair and stage 13 from Spilimbergo to Grossglockner, while finishing sixth in the overall classification.

In the 2012 Giro d'Italia, Rujano pulled out of the race, reportedly suffering from mononucleosis.

=== Vacansoleil–DCM (2013) ===
Rujano left Androni Giocattoli–Venezuela at the end of 2012, and joined Vacansoleil–DCM for the 2013 season. Rujano reportedly retired during the 2013 season, but later in the season, he backtracked from his retirement and remained within the professional fold after terminating his contract with Vacansoleil–DCM.

== Major results ==
2002
3rd Overall Vuelta al Táchira

1st Stage 13

2003
1st Stage 4 Clásico RCN
2004
1st Overall Vuelta al Táchira

1st Mountains classification
1st Young rider classification
1st Stages 5 & 13 (ITT)

2nd Time trial, Pan American Road Championships
3rd Overall Vuelta a Venezuela

1st Young rider classification

2005
1st Overall Vuelta al Táchira

1st Mountains classification
1st Stages 6, 7 & 13 (ITT)

1st Overall Clásico Ciclístico Banfoandes

1st Points classification
1st Stages 4, 7 & 8 (ITT)

2nd Overall Tour de Langkawi
3rd Overall Giro d'Italia

1st Mountains classification
1st Combativity classification
1st Stage 19

3rd Giro d'Oro
8th Overall Giro del Trentino
2006
7th Giro dell'Appennino
2007
1st Time trial, National Road Championships
2008
5th Prueba Villafranca de Ordizia
6th Overall Deutschland Tour
6th Subida a Urkiola
2009
1st Time trial, National Road Championships
1st Overall Vuelta a Colombia

1st Stages 6, 8, 10 & 14 (ITT)

1st Overall Vuelta a Venezuela

1st Stages 8 & 9

9th Overall Vuelta al Táchira

1st Stages 7, 10 & 11 (ITT)

2010
1st Overall Vuelta al Táchira

1st Stage 8 (ITT)

1st Overall Tour de Langkawi

1st Stage 6

1st Stage 7 Vuelta a Venezuela
3rd Overall Vuelta a Colombia

1st Stage 9

2011
1st Stage 1b (TTT) Settimana Internazionale di Coppi e Bartali
5th Giro dell'Appennino
6th Overall Giro d'Italia (Note: Rujano was promoted one position retroactively, after Alberto Contador's results were disqualified following his backdated two-year ban in February 2012.)

1st Stages 9 & 13

8th Overall Giro del Trentino
9th Overall Vuelta a Venezuela
2012
2nd Overall Tour de Langkawi
5th Overall Giro del Trentino
9th Overall Settimana Internazionale di Coppi e Bartali
2013
1st Time trial, National Road Championships
2014
2nd Time trial, National Road Championships
2015
1st Overall Vuelta al Táchira

1st Mountains classification
1st Stage 6

2nd Time trial, National Road Championships
6th Time trial, Pan American Road Championships
7th Overall Vuelta a Colombia
2016
Pan American Road Championships

6th Road race
10th Time trial

2019
5th Overall Vuelta a Venezuela
10th Overall Tour de Guadeloupe

=== Grand Tour general classification results timeline ===
Grand Tour	2005	2006	2007	2008	2009	2010	2011	2012
Giro d'Italia	3	DNF	—	49	—	—	6	DNF
Tour de France	—	DNF	—	—	—	—	—	—
Vuelta a España	Has not contested during his career							

Legend
—	Did not compete
DNF	Did not finish
