= Gil Cordovés =

Cuban cyclist (born 1965)

Personal information
- Full name: Gil Cordovés Pérez
- Born: 14 March 1965 (age 61) Santiago de Cuba, Cuba

Cycling career
- Sport: Cycling
- Disciplines: Road, track
- Role: Rider
- Rider type: Sprinter

Amateur teams
- 2001: Café de Costa Rica
- 2001–2008: Gobernación del Zulia
- 2009–2012: Gobernación del Zulia
- 2013: Gobernación de Carabobo
- 2014: Gobernación del Táchira–Concafé

Professional team
- 2008: Tecos Trek UAG

Gil Cordovés Pérez (born March 14, 1965) is a track and road racing cyclist. Formerly a competitor for Cuba, Cordovés thereafter competed for Venezuela.

== Major results ==
1995
Pan American Games

1st 1 km Time Trial
3rd Individual sprint

1999
1st Stage 7 Vuelta a Venezuela
2000
Vuelta a Venezuela

1st Points classification
1st Sprints classification

2001
Vuelta a Venezuela

1st Stages 2, 3, 8, 10b & 13

1st Prologue (ITT) Vuelta Ciclista a Costa Rica
2002
Vuelta a Venezuela

1st Stages 1, 4, 9b & 10

1st Prologue (ITT) Vuelta Ciclista a Costa Rica
2003
1st Clasico Corre Por La Vida
Vuelta a Venezuela

1st Stages 1, 3, 5b, 6, 8, 12 & 14

1st Stage 3 Vuelta a Colombia
2004
1st Overall Clasico Aniversario Federacion Ciclista de Venezuela
1st Overall Vuelta al Estado Zulia
Vuelta a Venezuela

1st Stages 1, 2, 5, 7, 9b, 13 & 14

1st Stage 5 Volta do Río de Janeiro
2005
1st Overall Vuelta al Estado Zulia

1st Stages 1, 4, 5 & 6

Vuelta a Venezuela

1st Stages 5, 12 & 14

Vuelta a la Independencia Nacional

1st Prologue (ITT), Stages 5a & 9

Vuelta Ciclista Aragua

1st Stages 1 & 2

1st Stage 2 Vuelta al Tachira
2006
1st Overall Vuelta al Estado Zulia

1st Stages 2a, 2b, 4, 6, 7a & 7b

1st Overall Vuelta al Estado Portugesa

1st Stages 2, 3, 4b & 5

1st Overall Clasico Aniversario Federacion Ciclista de Venezuela
Vuelta a Venezuela

1st Stages 1, 3, 6, 7, 9, 11 & 14

Vuelta Internacional al Estado Trujillo

1st Stages 1, 2 & 3

Vuelta a Yacambu-Lara

1st Stages 2b & 3

1st Stage 1 Vuelta Ciclista Aragua
1st Stage 2a Vuelta al Oriente
1st Stage 3 Clasico Ciclistico Banfoandes
2007
1st Overall Vuelta al Estado Zulia

1st Stages 1, 2 & 4b

Vuelta a Venezuela

1st Stages 1b, 3, 7, 13 & 14

Vuelta al Oriente

1st Stages 1, 2, 3, 4 & 6

Vuelta al Estado Portugesa

1st Stages 2, 4 & 6

Vuelta a Yacambu-Lara

1st Stages 2b & 5

1st Stage 3 Clasico Pedro Infante
1st Stage 1 Clasico Ciclistico Banfoandes
2008
1st Overall Vuelta a los Valles de Tuy

1st Stage 1

1st Clasico ciudad de Caracas
Vuelta a la Independencia Nacional

1st Prologue (ITT), Stages 2, 5b, 6 & 9

Vuelta a Venezuela

1st Stages 6, 8 & 13

Clasico Ciclistico Banfoandes

1st Stages 2 & 4

1st Stage 2 Vuelta al Oriente
1st Stage 1 Vuelta al Estado Zulia
2nd Clasico Corre Por La Vida
3rd Virgen de la Candelaria
2010
Vuelta a Venezuela

1st Stages 3, 5 & 11

1st Stage 3 Vuelta al Táchira
2011
1st Stage 7 Vuelta a Venezuela
4th Clasico FVCiclismo Corre Por la VIDA
2012
Vuelta a Venezuela

1st Sprints classification
1st Stage 3

2014
2nd National Road Race Championships
