= Alejandro González (cyclist) =

Argentine cyclist

Alejandro Walter González (born 5 August 1972) is a male professional racing cyclist from Argentina, who is nicknamed "El Ñoqui".

== Career ==
2003
3rd in Stage 7 Vuelta de San Juan, Jachal (ARG)
1st in Stage 7 part b Vuelta a Venezuela, Zinaco (VEN)
2nd in Stage 12 Vuelta a Venezuela, Carora (VEN)
2004
3rd in Stage 1 Clásica del Oeste-Doble Bragado, Mercedes (ARG)
1st in Stage 3 Clásica del Oeste-Doble Bragado, Pergamino (ARG)
3rd in Stage 4 Clásica del Oeste-Doble Bragado, 25 de Mayo (ARG)
2nd in Stage 6 part A Clásica del Oeste-Doble Bragado, Bragado (ARG)
1st in General Classification Clásica del Oeste-Doble Bragado (ARG)
3rd in General Classification Vuelta al Valle (ARG)
2006
2nd in 100 KM Capillenses (ARG)
2nd in Aniversario 3 de Febrero (ARG)
