= César Salazar (cyclist) =

Colombian cyclist (born 1972)

Personal information
- Full name: César Augusto Salazar Herrera
- Born: 14 February 1972 (age 54) Pereira, Colombia

Cycling career
- Sport: Cycling
- Current team: Retired
- Discipline: Road
- Role: Rider

Amateur team
- Loteria del Táchira

César Augusto Salazar Herrera (born February 14, 1972, in Pereira, Risaralda) is a Colombian former road racing cyclist, who also holds Venezuelan nationality.

== Major results ==
1997
1st Overall Vuelta al Táchira

1st Stage 11

1998
1st Stage 4 Vuelta al Táchira
1999
1st Overall Vuelta Internacional al Estado Trujillo
1st Stage 12 Vuelta a Venezuela
2000
1st in Stage 3 Vuelta al Táchira
2001
1st Overall Clásico Virgen de la Consolación de Táriba
1st Stage 11 Vuelta al Táchira
2nd Overall Clásico Ciclístico Banfoandes
2003
1st Overall Vuelta a Guatemala
1st Stages 1 & 14 Vuelta al Táchira
3rd Overall Doble Copacabana GP Fides
2004
1st Stages 10 & 11 Vuelta al Táchira
2nd Overall Clásica de la Consolación
2005
3rd Overall Vuelta a Cuba
2nd Overall Clásica de la Consolación
2006
1st Stage 9 Vuelta al Táchira
1st Stages 1 & 6 Clásico Ciclístico Banfoandes
2007
1st Overall Vuelta a Venezuela
1st Stages 2 (TTT), 11 & 14 Vuelta al Táchira
2008
1st Stage 13 Vuelta a Colombia
3rd Overall Vuelta a Bramon
2009
1st Stage 1a (TTT) Vuelta a Lara

alongside Noel Vasquez, Yeison Delgado, Artur García, Tomás Gil, Daniel Abreu, Yonathan Salinas, and Carlos Becerra

2nd Overall Vuelta a Venezuela
3rd Overall Vuelta a Colombia
