= José Alarcón (cyclist) =

Venezuelan racing cyclist

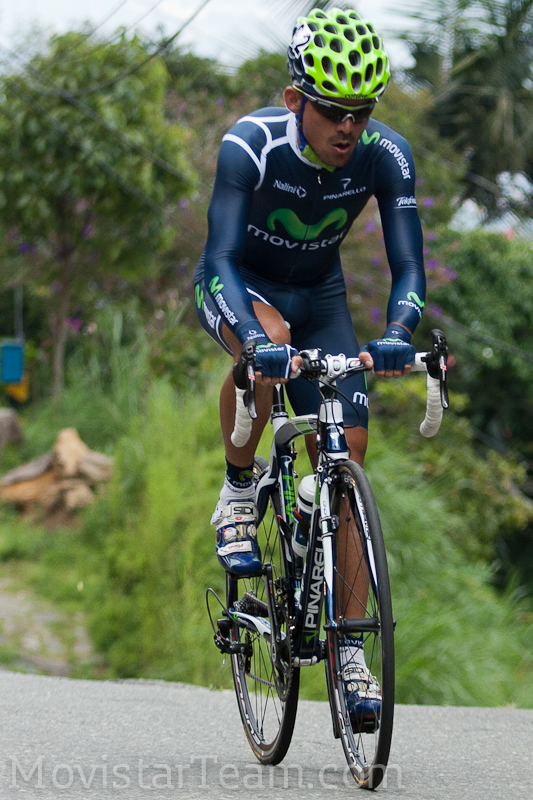

Personal information
- Full name: José Antonio Alarcón Morales
- Born: 12 June 1988 (age 38) El Vigía, Venezuela

Cycling career
- Sport: Cycling
- Current team: Gran Misión Transporte Venezuela
- Discipline: Road
- Role: Rider

Amateur teams
- 2007: Kino Táchira Banfoandes
- 2008–2010: Sumiglov Fundemer Merida
- 2010: Lotería de Boyacá
- 2013–2014: Canels Turbo
- 2014: Gobernación de Mérida–PDVSA
- 2015–2017: Lotería del Táchira
- 2018: Banco Bicentenario–Gobierno de Yaracuy
- 2019: Gobernación de Miranda–Trek
- 2020–2021: Deportivo Táchira–JHS
- 2022–: Gran Misión Transporte Venezuela

Professional team
- 2011–2012: Movistar Continental Team

José Antonio Alarcón Morales (born June 12, 1988) is a Venezuelan road cyclist, who rides for the Gran Misión Transporte Venezuela team.

== Major results ==
2007
1st Clasico Corre Por La Vida
10th Overall Clásico Ciclístico Banfoandes
10th Overall Vuelta a Guatemala
2008
4th Overall Vuelta a Venezuela
2009
1st Stage 3 Vuelta a Tovar
2nd Overall Vuelta a Yacambu-Lara

1st Stage 2

2nd Overall Clásico Virgen de la Consolación de Táriba
4th Overall Vuelta a Venezuela
8th Overall Vuelta al Táchira

1st Stage 8

2010
National Under-23 Road Championships

2nd Road race
2nd Time trial

2nd Overall Vuelta al Táchira

1st Stages 4, 9 & 12

2nd Overall Vuelta a Cuba

1st Stage 8

2nd Overall Vuelta a Venezuela
2011
6th Overall Vuelta al Táchira
2013
2nd Overall Clásico Aniversario de la Federación Venezolana de Ciclismo
5th Overall Vuelta a Venezuela
7th Overall Vuelta al Táchira
Pan American Road Championships

8th Time trial
9th Road race

2014
6th Overall Vuelta al Táchira
2015
1st Overall Vuelta a Venezuela

1st Mountains classification
1st Stage 3

4th Overall Vuelta a Guatemala
10th Overall Vuelta al Táchira
2016
2nd Time trial, National Road Championships
3rd Overall Vuelta a Venezuela

1st Stage 7

2017
2nd Time trial, National Road Championships
2018
2nd Overall Vuelta a Venezuela
3rd Time trial, National Road Championships
8th Time trial, Central American and Caribbean Games
2021
6th Overall Vuelta al Táchira

1st Stage 7

7th Overall Tour de Guadeloupe

1st Mountains classification

2022
1st Stage 7 Vuelta al Táchira
2nd Time trial, National Road Championships
2023
1st Overall Vuelta al Tachira en Bicicleta

1st Mountains classification
1st Stages 5 & 7
