= Franklin Molina =

Venezuelan racing cyclist (born 1984)

Franklin Molina (born August 28, 1984) is a male professional road cyclist from Venezuela.

== Career ==
2009
1st in V Válida Rescatando el Ciclismo Aragüeño (VEN)
1st in Stage 1 Vuelta al Estado Portugesa, Guanaré (VEN)
1st in General Classification Vuelta al Estado Portugesa (VEN)
