= Olinto Silva =

Venezuelan cyclist

Personal information
- Born: 3 August 1960 (age 66)

Cycling career
- Sport: Cycling

Olinto Silva (born 3 August 1960) is a Venezuelan former cyclist. He competed in the individual road race and team time trial events at the 1980 Summer Olympics.
