= Manuel Guevara =

Venezuelan cyclist

Personal information
- Full name: Manuel Enrique Guevara Reydtler
- Born: 15 July 1969 (age 57) Villa de Cura, Aragua

Cycling career
- Sport: Cycling
- Current team: Retired
- Discipline: Road
- Role: Rider

Amateur teams
- 2002–2005: Lotería del Táchira
- 2006–2007: Gobernación Bolivariano Carabobo
Medal record
Men's road bicycle racing
Representing Venezuela
Pan American Championships
Gold medal – first place	2004 Cojedes	Road race

Manuel Enrique Guevara Reydtler (born July 15, 1969 in Villa de Cura, Aragua) is a retired professional road cyclist from Venezuela. He twice competed for his native country at the Summer Olympics, in 1996 and 2000.

== Career ==
1991
1st Stage 12 Vuelta al Táchira
1999
1st National Road Race Championships
1st Stages 5b & 13 Vuelta a Venezuela
2001
1st in Stage 3 Vuelta al Táchira
1st Overall Vuelta a la Independencia Nacional

1st Stages 3, 4 & 8

2002
1st Overall Doble Sucre Potosí GP Cemento Fancesa
1st Stage 9 Vuelta al Táchira
2003
1st in Stage 4 Vuelta al Táchira, Santa Ana (VEN)
2004
1st (gold) Pan American Road Race Championships
2005
1st Stage 1 Vuelta al Táchira
