= Tommy Alcedo =

Venezuelan cyclist (born 1976)

Personal information
- Full name: Tommy Auma Free Alcedo Pérez
- Born: 26 April 1976 (age 50)

Cycling career
- Sport: Cycling
- Discipline: Road cycling
- Role: Rider

Major wins
- 1st in Venezuelan National Championships (2000, 2002)

Tommy Auma Free Alcedo Pérez (born 26 April 1976) is a Venezuelan professional road cyclist.

== Career ==
1999
1st in General Classification Independencia Nacional, Santo Domingo (DOM)
1st in Stage 6 Vuelta a Venezuela, San Juan de los Morros (VEN)
2000
1st in Stage 8 Vuelta al Táchira, Capacho (VEN)
1st in Venezuelan National Championships, Road, Elite, Venezuela (VEN)
1st in Stage 5 Vuelta a Venezuela, Los Teques (VEN)
2001
1st in Stage 4 Vuelta al Táchira, Santa Ana (VEN)
1st in Stage 12 Vuelta al Táchira, Bramón (VEN)
1st in Stage 5 Vuelta a Venezuela, Valle de la Pascua (VEN)
1st in Stage 7 Vuelta a Venezuela, San Juan de los Morros (VEN)
2002
1st in Stage 3 Vuelta a Bramon, Delicias (VEN)
1st in Stage 4 Vuelta a Bramon, Santa Ana del Tachira (VEN)
1st in Venezuelan National Championships, Road, Elite, Venezuela (VEN)
2003
1st in Stage 2 Vuelta a Venezuela, Maturin (VEN)
1st in Stage 5 part b Doble Copacabana GP Fides, Copacabana (BOL)
2004
1st in General Classification Clasico Ciclistico Banfoandes (VEN)
3rd in General Classification Vuelta a Yacambu-Lara (VEN)
2007
1st in Virgen de la Candelaria (VEN)
1st in Stage 7 Vuelta a la Independencia Nacional, Jarabacoa (DOM)
2008
1st in Stage 4 Vuelta al Oriente, El Tigre (VEN)
