= Santa Cruz de Mora =

- Coordinates: 8.399°N 71.641°W

Santa Cruz de Mora is a city of Venezuela. Capital of the Antonio Pinto Salinas municipality of the Mérida State, located 40 kilometers from the city of Mérida. The city is home of the Venezuelan cyclist José Rujano and the former governor of the state Alexis Ramírez. The mayor is Edgar Márquez.

The city has a population of about 21,000 to 24,000 people.
