= Federico Muñoz =

Colombian cyclist

Personal information
- Full name: Federico Muñoz Fernández
- Born: 7 May 1963 (age 63) San Andrés, Santander, Colombia

Cycling career
- Sport: Cycling
- Discipline: Road
- Role: Rider

Amateur team
- 1999: Lotería de Santander

Professional team
- 1988–1992: Postobón–Manzana
- 1993–1996: Kelme–Xacobeo
- 1997–1998: Flavia–Telecom

Federico Muñoz Fernández (born May 7, 1963, in San Andrés, Santander) is a Colombian former road racing cyclist, who was a professional from 1988 to 2004.

== Career achievements ==
=== Major results ===
1991
2nd Overall Vuelta y Ruta de Mexico

1st Stage 2

1992
7th Overall Route du Sud
1993
1st Road race, National Road Championships
9th Overall Vuelta a Colombia
1994
3rd Overall Volta ao Algarve

1st Stage 2

1996
3rd Clasica a los Puertos de Guadarrama
1999
1st Overall Vuelta a los Santanderes
1st Stage 11 Vuelta a Colombia
2000
9th Overall Vuelta a Colombia
2001
1st Stage 13 Vuelta al Táchira
1st Stage 11 Vuelta a Colombia
4th Overall Vuelta a Venezuela
2002
1st Overall Vuelta a Venezuela

1st Stage 9a

2003
1st Stage 11 Vuelta al Táchira
1st Stage 3a Vuelta a Costa Rica (TTT)
2nd Overall Vuelta a Venezuela

1st Stage 9

2004
1st Overall Vuelta a Venezuela

1st Stage 9a

=== Grand Tour general classification results timeline ===
Grand Tour	1993	1994	1995	1996	1997	1998
Giro d'Italia	38	33	DNF	—	—	—
Tour de France	—	23	24	89	—	—
Vuelta a España	—	—	—	—	39	44

Legend
DSQ	Disqualified
DNF	Did not finish
