= Tomás Teresen =

Venezuelan racing cyclist (born 1987)

Tomás Teresen (born August 14, 1987) is a male professional road cyclist from Venezuela.

== Career ==
2005
1st in Stage 4 Vuelta a Sucre (VEN)
2006
1st in Venezuela National Championship, Road, U23, Venezuela, San Carlos, Cojedes (VEN)
