= Miguel Chacón (Venezuelan cyclist) =

Venezuelan racing cyclist

Medal record
Men's Track Cycling
Representing Venezuela
Central American and Caribbean Games
| Silver medal – second place | 2006 Cartagena | Scratch |

Miguel Ernesto Chacón Sosa (born October 8, 1983) is a male professional road cyclist from Venezuela.

== Career ==
2004
(silver) in Pan American Championships, Track, Team Pursuit, Elite, San Carlos Tinaquillo
(silver) in Pan American Championships, Road, U23, San Carlos Tinaquillo
1st in Stage 3 Vuelta a Venezuela (VEN)
2005
1st in Stage 3 Vuelta a Cuba, Bayamo (CUB)
1st in Stage 3 part b Vuelta a Venezuela, Barquisimeto Circuit Av. Venezuela (VEN)
1st in Stage 9 Vuelta a Venezuela, Valle La Pascua (VEN)
1st in Stage 2 Clasico Ciclistico Banfoandes, Ciudad Bolivia (VEN)
2nd in General Classification Vuelta al Estado Zulia (VEN)
2007
1st in Stage 1 Vuelta a Venezuela, Aracataca (COL)
2009
1st in Stage 3 Vuelta al Estado Portugesa, Piritu circuito (VEN)
1st in Stage 4 Vuelta al Estado Portugesa, Acarigua (VEN)
