= Paul Torres =

Venezuelan racing cyclist

Paúl Torres
Personal information
- Born: November 21, 1983 (age 42) Caracas, Venezuela

Cycling career
- Sport: Cycling
- Discipline: Racing
- Role: Rider

Paúl Alberto Torres García (born November 21, 1983, in Caracas) is a retired Venezuelan professional racing cyclist. In 2006, while racing for the Gobernaciòn del Zulia-Alcaldia de Cabimas cycling team, he was excluded from racing in the Vuelta a Colombia for having high haematocrit numbers.

== Career ==
2004
1st in Stage 4 Tour de la Guadeloupe, Vieux-Habitants (GUA)
2005
1st in Stage 2 Vuelta Internacional al Estado Trujillo, Betijoque (VEN)
1st in Stage 3 Vuelta Internacional al Estado Trujillo, Circuito El Dividive-Sabana de Mendoza (VEN)
2006
1st in Stage 6 Vuelta Internacional al Estado Trujillo, Bocono (VEN)
1st in Stage 8 Vuelta Internacional al Estado Trujillo (VEN)
2nd in General Classification Vuelta Internacional al Estado Trujillo (VEN)
2008
1st in Stage 7 Vuelta al Táchira, El Vígia (VEN)
