= Miguel Ubeto =

Venezuelan racing cyclist

Personal information
- Full name: Miguel Armando Ubeto Aponte
- Born: 2 September 1976 (age 50) Caracas, Venezuela
- Height: 1.68 m (5 ft 6 in)
- Weight: 60 kg (132 lb)

Cycling career
- Sport: Cycling
- Discipline: Road
- Role: Rider

Amateur teams
- 2001: Distribuidora Japonesa-Lotería Oriente TLM
- 2003–2005: Triple Gordo Lara
- 2006–2007: Espoir Du Sud
- 2007: Fundadeporte Carabobo
- 2008–2011: Gobernación de Carabobo
- 2010–2011: Gwada Bikers 118
- 2011–2012: Lotería del Táchira
- 2014: Gobernación del Táchira–Concafé
- 2015: Amo Táchira–Concafé–Táchira
- 2015–2016: Gobernación de Nueva Esparta
- 2016: Kino Táchira
- 2017: Lotería del Táchira
- 2018: Team Nicolas Dubois
- 2018–2020: Venezuela País de Futuro
- 2021–2022: MU Training–Venezuela País de Futuro

Professional teams
- 2012: Androni Giocattoli–Venezuela
- 2013: Lampre–Merida
Medal record
Representing Venezuela
Men's track cycling
Pan American Games
Gold medal – first place	2015 Toronto	Road race
Silver medal – second place	2011 Guadalajara	Road race
Central American and Caribbean Games
Silver medal – second place	1998 Maracaibo	4000m Team Pursuit
Bronze medal – third place	2002 San Salvador	Madison
Men's road bicycle racing
Pan American Championships
Bronze medal – third place	2004 Cojedes	Road race

Miguel Armando Ubeto Aponte (Note: In this Spanish name, the first or paternal surname is Ubeto and the second or maternal family name is Aponte.) (born 2 September 1976) is a Venezuelan road racing cyclist. He turned professional in 2012 with Androni Giocattoli–Venezuela before signing with the UCI World Tour team Lampre–Merida for 2013. In 2011 he won the UCI America Tour.

== Career ==
In May 2013, Caracas-born Ubeto was provisionally suspended for an adverse finding of GW501516. He was later banned for two years, before being reduced to 14 months.

Following this suspension, Ubeto won the gold medal in the road race at the 2015 Pan American Games in Toronto, Canada.

On 7 July 2018, while riding for the team "Venezuela País de Futuro", Ubeto won the 3rd stage in the Vuelta a Venezuela. On 1 August 2018, Ubeto was provisionally suspended by the UCI for "Use of Prohibited Methods and/or Prohibited Substances", serving a further ban.

== Major results ==
1998
2nd Team pursuit, Central American and Caribbean Games
2002
Vuelta a la Independencia Nacional

1st Stages 1 & 3

3rd Madison, Central American and Caribbean Games
2004
1st Stage 2 Vuelta al Táchira
2nd Overall Tour de Guadeloupe
3rd Road race, Pan American Road Championships
10th Overall Vuelta a Cuba
2005
1st Clasico Ciudad de Caracas
1st Stage 13 Vuelta a Venezuela
6th Road race, Pan American Road Championships
2007
1st Stage 4 Vuelta a la Independencia Nacional
1st Stage 3 Vuelta Internacional al Estado Trujillo
1st Stage 2 Vuelta a Venezuela
8th Overall Tour de Guadeloupe
2008
8th Overall Vuelta a Cuba
2009
1st Stage 1 Vuelta al Táchira
2nd Overall Tour de Guadeloupe
2010
Vuelta al Táchira

1st Stages 1 (TTT), 2 & 5

1st Stage 1 Vuelta a Cuba
9th Overall Tour de Guadeloupe

1st Stages 2b (TTT) & 8a

2011
1st 2010–11 UCI America Tour
1st Road race, National Road Championships
1st Clasico Corre Por La Vida
Vuelta al Táchira

1st Stages 3 & 7

Vuelta a Venezuela

1st Stages 4b & 10

2nd Road race, Pan American Games
5th Overall Tour de Guadeloupe

1st Stage 2b

7th Overall Vuelta a la Independencia Nacional
2012
1st Road race, National Road Championships
1st Overall Vuelta a Venezuela
1st Stage 1 Vuelta al Táchira
6th Road race, Pan American Road Championships
2015
1st Road race, Pan American Games
1st Clasico FVCiclismo Corre Por la VIDA
2nd Road race, National Road Championships
4th Copa Federación Venezolana de Ciclismo
2017
1st Road race, National Road Championships
8th Overall Tour de Guadeloupe
2018
1st Stage 3 Vuelta a Venezuela
2021
1st Stage 3 Vuelta a Venezuela
2022
6th Overall Vuelta a Venezuela
