= José Chacón Díaz =

Venezuelan cyclist (born 1977)

Personal information
- Full name: José Isidro Chacón Díaz
- Born: 27 January 1977 (age 49) Táriba, Venezuela

Cycling career
- Sport: Cycling
- Discipline: Road
- Role: Rider

Amateur team
- Lotería del Táchira
Medal record
Men's road cycling
Representing Venezuela
Pan American Championships
Gold medal – first place	2004 Cojedes	Time trial
Central American and Caribbean Games
Gold medal – first place	2002 San Salvador	Road race
Silver medal – second place	2002 San Salvador	Time trial
Bronze medal – third place	2006 Cartagena	Time trial

José Isidro Chacón Díaz (born January 27, 1977, in Táriba) is a Venezuelan professional racing cyclist.

== Major results ==
2000
1st Stage 2 Vuelta al Táchira
4th Overall Vuelta a Venezuela
2001
1st Overall Vuelta a Venezuela

1st Stages 9 & 10a

1st Stage 7 Vuelta al Táchira
2002
1st Overall Vuelta a Bramon

1st Stage 2

Vuelta al Táchira

1st Stages 3 & 12

1st Stage 5 Vuelta a Venezuela
2003
1st National Time Trial Championships
1st Overall Vuelta a Venezuela

1st Stages 5a & 10

2004
1st Pan American Time Trial Championships
1st National Road Race Championships
1st National Time Trial Championships
1st Stage 9 Vuelta al Táchira
1st Stage 4 Vuelta a Venezuela
2nd Overall Vuelta a Cuba
2005
1st Overall Vuelta a Venezuela
2nd Overall Vuelta al Tachira

1st Stage 8

2nd Overall Vuelta al Estado Portugesa

1st Stage 3

2nd Overall Vuelta a Yacambu-Lara
2006
1st Stage 1 Clasico Aniversario Federacion Ciclista de Venezuela
2nd Central American and Caribbean Games – Individual time trial
3rd Overall Vuelta a Venezuela
2007
1st Stage 2 Vuelta al Táchira
1st Stage 9 Vuelta a Venezuela
2008
1st Stage 12 Vuelta al Táchira
5th Overall Vuelta a Venezuela
2009
3rd Overall Vuelta a Venezuela
2013
2nd Overall Tour de Guadeloupe

1st Stage 8b (ITT)

4th Overall Vuelta a Venezuela
2016
3rd Overall Tour de Guadeloupe
