= Franklin Chacón =

Venezuelan cyclist

Personal information
- Born: February 12, 1979 (age 47) Táchira, Venezuela

Cycling career
- Sport: Cycling
- Current team: Retires
- Disciplines: Road; Track
- Role: Rider

Professional teams
- 2006: Gobernación del Zulia–Alcaldía de Cabimas
- 2008: Café Quetzal Sello Verde
- 2009–2010: Gobernación del Zulia
- 2011: Alcaldía de Valencia
- 2012–2013: Gobernación del Zulia
- 2015: Gobernación de Mérida
Medal record
Representing Venezuela
Men's track cycling
Central American and Caribbean Games
Silver medal – second place	2002 San Salvador	4000m Team Pursuit
Pan American Games
Bronze medal – third place	2007 Rio de Janeiro	Team Pursuit
Men's road cycling
Pan American Games
Bronze medal – third place	2003 Santo Domingo	Road Time Trial

Franklin Raúl Chacón Colmenares (born February 12, 1979) is a Venezuelan former professional track and road racing cyclist.

== Major results ==
2000
1st Stage 5 Vuelta al Táchira
2001
3rd Under-23 road race, Pan American Championships
2002
1st National Time Trial Championships
1st Stage 1 Vuelta a Bramon
1st Stage 1 Vuelta al Táchira
2nd Overall Vuelta a Venezuela
2003
3rd Individual time trial, Pan American Games
4th Overall Vuelta a Venezuela
2004
2nd Overall Vuelta a Venezuela
2005
1st Stage 3 Vuelta Ciclista Aragua
2nd Overall Vuelta a Tovar
10th Overall Vuelta a Venezuela

1st Stage 3a

2006
1st Stage 3 Vuelta al Tachira
3rd Overall Vuelta a Cuba
6th Overall Vuelta a Venezuela
2007
1st Overall Vuelta al Estado Yaracuy

1st Stage 1

1st Juegos del Alba
2nd Team pursuit, Pan American Championships
2nd Overall Vuelta al Estado Portugesa

1st Stage 3

3rd Team pursuit, Pan American Games
2008
1st Overall Vuelta a Yacambu-Lara
1st Stage 1 Clásico Virgen de la Consolación de Táriba
2nd Overall Vuelta a Venezuela

1st Stage 4

3rd Clasico Aniversario Federacion Ciclista de Venezuela
9th Overall Vuelta a Guatemala

1st Stages 1, 2 & 12

2009
4th Overall Vuelta a Cuba
2013
10th Overall Vuelta a Venezuela
