= Vuelta a Venezuela =

Venezuelan multi-day road cycling race

Race details
- Date: Varies
- English name: Tour of Venezuela
- Discipline: Road
- Competition: UCI America Tour
- Type: Stage race
- Organiser: Federacion Venezolana de Ciclismo

History
- First edition: 1963
- Editions: 62 (as of 2025)
- First winner: Gregorio Garrizalez (VEN)
- Most wins: Olinto Silva (VEN); José Chacón Díaz (VEN) (3 wins)
- Most recent: Luis Mora (VEN)

The Vuelta a Venezuela (English: Tour of Venezuela) is a men's multi-day road cycling race held annually in Venezuela. Between, 2005 and 2019 and 2021 and 2022, the race carried a UCI rating of 2.2 and was part of the UCI America Tour, which is one of six UCI Continental Circuits sponsored by the Union Cycliste Internationale. In 2023, the race dropped down to national level. The event is organized by the Federacion Venezolana de Ciclismo.

== Past winners ==
Year	Winner	Team
1963	Gregorio Garrizalez (VEN)	Carabobo
1964	Domingo López (VEN)	Lara
1965	Armando Blanco (VEN)	Aragua
1966	Félix Bermúdez (VEN)	D.F.
1967	Nicolas Reidtler (VEN)	Aragua
1968	Fernando Fontes (VEN)	Tàchira
1969	Luis Villarroel (VEN)	Carabobo
1970	Santos Bermúdez (VEN)	Tàchira
1971	Nicolas Reidtler (VEN)	Tàchira
1972	Cirilo Correa (VEN)	Guàrico
1973	Victor Rubiano (VEN)	Tàchira
1974	Luis Vivas (VEN)	Tàchira
1975	Ramón Ramírez (VEN)	Trujillo
1976	Ramón Noriega (VEN)	D.F.
1977	not held	
1978	Juan Arroyo (VEN)	Guàrico
1979	Claudio Pérez (VEN)	Guàrico
1980	Olinto Silva (VEN)	Lara
1981	Olinto Silva (VEN)	Lara
1982	Enrique Campos (VEN)	Cojedes
1983	Olinto Silva (VEN)	Lara
1984	Elio Villamizar (VEN)	Tàchira
1985	Elio Villamizar (VEN)	Tàchira
1986	Mario Medina (VEN)	Tàchira
1987	José Lindarte (VEN)	Tàchira
1988	Richard Parra (VEN)	Tàchira
1989	Enzo Rivas (VEN)	Zulia
1990	Enrique Campos (VEN)	Miranda
1991	Julio Bernal (COL)	Trujillo
1992	Julio Bernal (COL)	Trujillo
1993	Omar Pumar (VEN)	Tàchira
1994	Joselin Saavedra (COL)	Tàchira
1995	Alfredo López (VEN)	Trujillo
1996	Pastor Linares (VEN)	Tàchira
1997	Javier Zapata (COL)	Lotería de Medellín
1998	Álvaro Lozano (COL)	Kross-Selle Italia
1999	Rui Lavarinhas (POR)	Maia Chin
2000	Álvaro Lozano (COL)	Distribuidora La Japonesa Lotería Oriente
2001	José Chacón Díaz (VEN)	Lotería del Táchira
2002	Federico Muñoz (COL)	Distribuidora La Japonesa Lotería Oriente
2003	José Chacón Díaz (VEN)	Lotería del Táchira
2004	Federico Muñoz (COL)	Triple Gordo Gob Lara
2005	José Chacón Díaz (VEN)	Gob Boliv. Car. Fundadeporte
2006	José Serpa (COL)	Selle Italia-Serramenti Diquigiovanni
2007	César Salazar (COL)	Lotería del Táchira
2008	Carlos José Ochoa (VEN)	Diquigiovanni-Androni
2009	José Rujano (VEN)	Gobernación del Zulia
2010	Tomás Gil (VEN)	Lotería del Táchira
2011	Pedro Gutiérrez (VEN)	Gobernación del Zulia
2012	Miguel Ubeto (VEN)	Androni Giocattoli–Venezuela
2013	Carlos José Ochoa (VEN)	Androni Giocattoli–Venezuela
2014	Jonathan Salinas (VEN)	Kino Táchira
2015	José Alarcón (VEN)	Lotería del Táchira
2016	Jonathan Monsalve (VEN)	JHS Aves
2017	Carlos Torres (VEN)	JHS Grupo
2018	Matteo Spreafico (ITA)	Androni Giocattoli–Sidermec
2019	Orluis Aular (VEN)	Matrix Powertag
2020	Orluis Aular (VEN)	Caja Rural–Seguros RGA
2021	Jorge Abreu (VEN)	Vzla Pais Futuro Fina Arroz
2022	Luis Gómez (VEN)	Team Carabobo
2023	César Sanabria (VEN)	Fina Arroz-Multimarcas Sport
2024	Walter Vargas (COL)	Team Medellín–EPM
2025	Luis Mora (VEN)	Gob. Trujillo-MPP Comercio

== See also ==
- Venezuelan National Road Race Championships
