= Rónald González (cyclist) =

Venezuelan racing cyclist

Personal information
- Full name: Rónald Javier González Escalante
- Born: 6 March 1981 (age 45) San Cristóbal, Táchira, Venezuela

Cycling career
- Sport: Cycling
- Current team: Team Osorio Grupo Ciclismo
- Discipline: Road
- Role: Rider

Amateur teams
- 2006–2017: Lotería del Táchira
- 2014–2015: Pédale Pilotine
- 2016–2018: UC Spiritaine
- 2018–2019: Deportivo Táchira
- 2019–2020: Lotería del Táchira
- 2020–: Osorio Group City Bike

Rónald Javier González Escalante (born 6 March 1981) is a Venezuelan professional racing cyclist.

== Major results ==
2003
1st Time trial, National Under-23 Road Championships
2005
1st Stages 3 & 11 Vuelta al Táchira
1st Stage 4 Vuelta al Estado Portugesa
2006
1st Stage 2 Clasico Aniversario Federacion Ciclista de Venezuela
2007
1st Stage 2 (TTT) Vuelta al Táchira
1st Overall Vuelta a Bramon

1st Stage 2

6th Overall Vuelta a Venezuela
2008
1st Stage 10 Vuelta al Táchira
2009
1st Overall Vuelta al Táchira

1st Stage 6

2010
1st Stage 2 Vuelta a Bolivia
3rd Overall Clásico Virgen de la Consolación de Táriba
2011
1st Stage 1 Vuelta a Trujillo
2012
1st Overall Clásico Virgen de la Consolación de Táriba

1st Stages 1 & 3

2nd Overall Vuelta al Táchira

1st Stages 3 & 6

2014
3rd Overall Clásico Virgen de la Consolación de Táriba
2015
1st Stage 3 Tour de Martinique
2016
2nd Overall Tour de Martinique
10th Overall Vuelta al Táchira
2017
10th Overall Vuelta al Táchira
2018
1st Stage 1 (TTT) Tour de Martinique
2nd Overall Vuelta al Táchira
2019
4th Overall Vuelta al Táchira

1st Stage 5
