= Tomás Gil =

Venezuelan racing cyclist

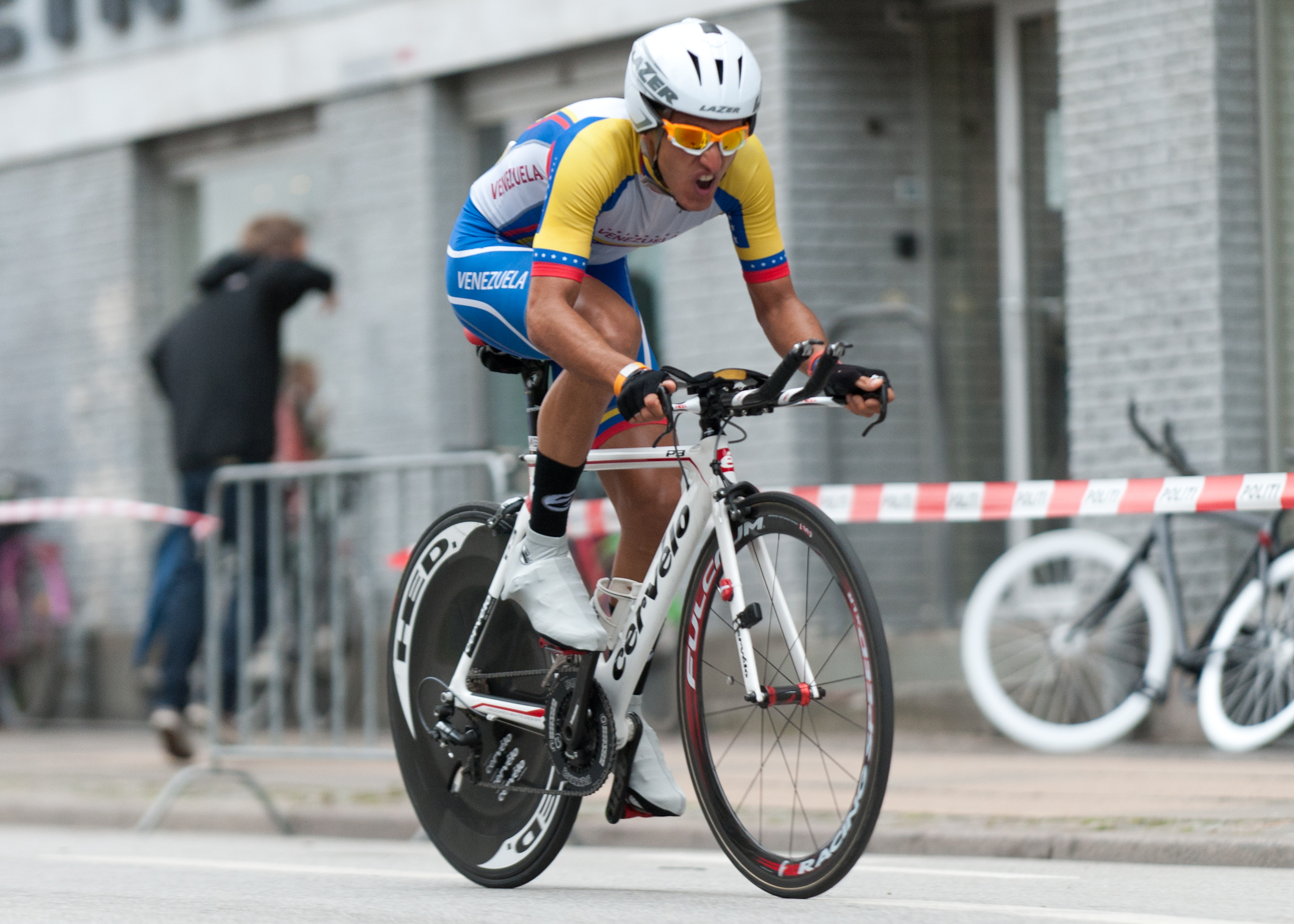
- Gil during the time trial at the 2011 UCI Road World Championships

Personal information
- Full name: Tomás Aurelio Gil Martínez
- Born: 23 May 1977 (age 49)
- Height: 1.65 m (5 ft 5 in)
- Weight: 65 kg (143 lb)

Cycling career
- Sport: Cycling
- Disciplines: Road; Track
- Role: Rider (retired); Directeur sportif

Amateur teams
- 2002: Gobernación de Anzoátegui
- 2003: Triple Gordo
- 2004–2005: Andalucía–Paul Versan
- 2006–2008: Gobernación Bolivariano Carabobo
- 2009–2011: Loteria Del Tachira
- 2015: Ona Idt Fona

Professional teams
- 2012–2013: Androni Giocattoli–Venezuela
- 2014–2016: Neri Sottoli

Managerial team
- 2017–2021: Wilier Triestina–Selle Italia
Medal record
Representing Venezuela
Men's track cycling
Pan American Games
Silver medal – second place	2007 Rio de Janeiro	Individual pursuit
Bronze medal – third place	2007 Rio de Janeiro	Team pursuit
Central American and Caribbean Games
Silver medal – second place	1998 Maracaibo	Team pursuit
Silver medal – second place	2002 San Salvador	Team pursuit
Silver medal – second place	2006 Cartagena	Team pursuit
Bronze medal – third place	2002 San Salvador	Madison
Bronze medal – third place	2006 Cartagena	Individual pursuit
Bronze medal – third place	2006 Cartagena	Road time trial
Men's road bicycle racing
Pan American Championships
Bronze medal – third place	2007 Valencia	Time trial
Bronze medal – third place	2011 Medellín	Time trial

Tomás Aurelio Gil Martínez (Note: In this Spanish name, the first or paternal surname is Gil and the second or maternal family name is Martínez.) (born 23 May 1977) is a Venezuelan former professional track and road cyclist, who rode professionally between 2012 and 2016 for the Androni Giocattoli–Venezuela and Yellow Fluo teams. Since retiring, Gil has worked as a directeur sportif for UCI ProTeam Vini Zabù between 2017 and 2021, and is scheduled to work in the same role for UCI WorldTeam UAE Team Emirates from the 2023 season.

== Major results ==
1998
2nd Team pursuit, Central American and Caribbean Games
2002
Central American and Caribbean Games

2nd Team pursuit
3rd Madison (with Miguel Ubeto)

2003
3rd Overall Vuelta a Venezuela
2004
Pan American Track Championships

2nd Individual pursuit
2nd Team pursuit

National Road Championships

2nd Time trial
3rd Road race

5th Overall Vuelta a Cuba

1st Stage 11a (ITT)

2005
1st Stage 3 Rutas del Vino
2006
1st Time trial, National Road Championships
1st Clasico Ciudad de Valencia
Central American and Caribbean Games

2nd Team pursuit
3rd Individual pursuit
3rd Time trial

3rd Team pursuit, Pan American Track Championships
2007
National Road Championships

1st Road race
3rd Time trial

1st Overall Vuelta al Estado Portugesa

1st Stage 5a

1st Stage 3 Vuelta al Estado Yaracuy
Pan American Games

2nd Individual pursuit
3rd Team pursuit

Pan American Track Championships

2nd Team pursuit
2nd Individual pursuit

3rd Individual time trial, Pan American Road Championships
3rd Overall Vuelta a Venezuela
2008
1st Time trial, National Road Championships
1st Clásico Gobernación de Anzoátegui
1st Stage 2 Clasico Pedro Infante
2nd Overall Vuelta a los Valles de Tuy

1st Stage 2

7th Clasico FVCiclismo Corre Por la VIDA
10th Overall Vuelta a la Independencia Nacional
2009
1st Overall Vuelta a Lara

1st Stage 1a (TTT)

2nd Overall Vuelta al Táchira
2010
1st Time trial, Central American and Caribbean Games
1st Time trial, National Road Championships
1st Overall Vuelta a Venezuela

1st Stage 8

South American Games

5th Time trial
10th Road race

2011
1st Overall Vuelta a la Independencia Nacional

1st Stage 6b (ITT)

2nd Time trial, National Road Championships
3rd Time trial, Pan American Road Championships
8th Time trial, Pan American Games
2012
1st Time trial, National Road Championships
1st Stage 2 Vuelta al Táchira
10th Time trial, Pan American Road Championships
2014
3rd Time trial, National Road Championships
2015
3rd Time trial, National Road Championships

=== Grand Tour general classification results timeline ===
Grand Tour	2013
Giro d'Italia	DNF
Tour de France	—
Vuelta a España	—

Legend
—	Did not compete
DNF	Did not finish
