= Carlos Ochoa (cyclist) =

Venezuelan cyclist

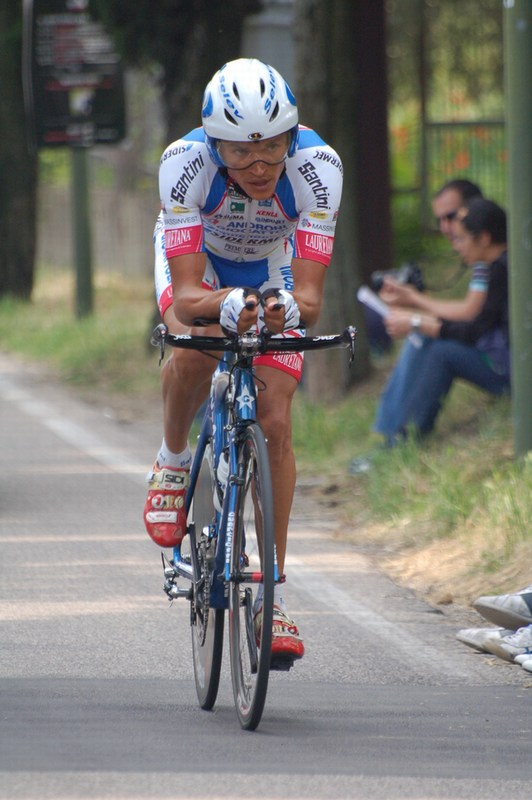

Personal information
- Full name: Carlos José Ochoa
- Born: December 14, 1980 (age 45) Nirgua, Venezuela
- Height: 1.80 m (5 ft 11 in)
- Weight: 62 kg (137 lb)

Cycling career
- Sport: Cycling
- Current team: Gobernación de Yaracuy AGV
- Discipline: Road
- Role: Rider

Amateur teams
- 2002–2005: Ejército–PDVSA–Gobierno Trujillo
- 2005: Café Flor de Patria SATRUD
- 2007: Triple Gordo
- 2007: Funda Rujano–Gobierno de Mérida PDVSA
- 2015–: Gobernación de Yaracuy AGV

Professional teams
- 2006: Team LPR
- 2008–2014: Diquigiovanni–Androni

Major wins
- Vuelta Ciclista a Venezuela, (2008)

Carlos José Ochoa (born December 14, 1980, in Nirgua, Yaracuy) is a Venezuelan road bicycle racer for amateur team Gobernación de Yaracuy AGV. Ochoa has also spent eight seasons as a professional; one with Team LPR in 2006, and the remaining seven with Androni Giocattoli–Venezuela between 2008 and 2014.

== Palmarès ==
2005
2nd Overall Vuelta a la Independencia Nacional

1st Stage 1 La Romana

2nd Overall Vuelta Internacional al Estado Trujillo

1st Stage 7 Bocono
1st Stage 8 Circuito al Valle de Motatán

1st Overall Vuelta a Yacambu-Lara

1st Stage 2a

2007
1st Overall Vuelta a Yacambu-Lara

1st Stage 2a Cuara

1st Overall Vuelta Internacional al Estado Trujillo

1st Stage 4 La Quebrada

2008
1st Stage 4 Tour de San Luis
1st, Overall Vuelta a la Independencia Nacional

1st Stage 7 Jarabacoa
1st Stage 8b Santo Domingo

1st Overall Vuelta a Venezuela
2009
5th Overall Vuelta a Venezuela
2011
1st Stage 1b Settimana internazionale di Coppi e Bartali (TTT)
2013
1st Overall Vuelta a Venezuela

Grand Tour general classification results timeline

Grand Tour	2008	2009	2010	2011	2012	2013	2014
Giro d'Italia	61	30	52	65	DNF	—	—
Tour de France	—	—	—	—	—	—	
Vuelta a España	—	—	—	—	—	—	

Legend
—	Did not compete
DNF	Did not finish
