= José Alirio Contreras =

Venezuelan racing cyclist (born 1978)

Personal information
- Born: March 21, 1978 (age 48) Venezuela

Cycling career
- Sport: Cycling
- Discipline: Racing
- Role: Rider

José Alirio Contreras Vásquez (born March 21, 1978) is a retired Venezuelan professional racing cyclist.

== Career ==
A mountain specialist, he led the 2010 Vuelta al Táchira for much of the race. Contreras raced with the Lotería del Táchira team for most of his professional career.

After the 2015 Vuelta al Táchira, Contreras signed with a new cycling team, sponsored by the Government of Mérida – Fundarujano. Contreras recorded his last professional race two months later in April 2015, when he did not finish stage six of the Vuelta Mexico.

== Career ==
2005
3rd in General Classification Vuelta a Santa Cruz de Mora (VEN)
1st in Mountains Classification Vuelta a Venezuela (VEN)
2006
3rd in General Classification Vuelta al Tachira (VEN)
2009
7th in General Classification Vuelta a Venezuela (VEN)
