= Clásico Ciclístico Banfoandes =

Annual road bicycle race in Venezuela

Clasico Ciclistico Banfoandes
Race details
- Date: Early-October
- Region: Venezuela
- English name: Banfoandes Cycling Classic
- Discipline: Road race
- Competition: UCI America Tour
- Type: Stage race

History
- First edition: 1990
- Editions: 12 (as of 2008)
- First winner: Sergio González (VEN)
- Most wins: Álvaro Lozano (COL) (2 wins)
- Most recent: José Serpa (COL)

Clasico Ciclistico Banfoandes is a road bicycle race held annually in Venezuela. The main sponsor of the event is Banfoandes. The 2008 edition was contested over 10 stages. From 1990 to 2004 it was reserved to amateurs; since 2005 it is rated 2.2 on the UCI America Tour.

== Winners ==
Year	Country	Rider	Team
1990	Venezuela	Sergio González	Lotería del Táchira
1991	Colombia	Néstor Freddy Barrera	Alcaldía de Cabimas
1992	Venezuela	Omar Pumar	Cadafe Uribante Caparo
1993	Colombia	Álvaro Lozano	Bono de Ciclismo
1994	Colombia	Álvaro Lozano	Bono de Ciclismo
1995-2000	No race		
2001	Colombia	Libardo Niño	Lotería de Boyacá
2002	Colombia	Julio César Rangel	Alcaldía de Cabimas
2003	Venezuela	Carlos Maya	Lotería del Táchira
2004	Venezuela	Tommy Alcedo	Lotería del Táchira
2005	Venezuela	José Rujano	Colombia-Selle Italia
2006	Colombia	Hernán Buenahora	Gobernacion del Zulia-BOD
2007	Colombia	Sergio Henao	Colombia es Pasion Team
2008	Colombia	José Serpa	Diquigiovanni–Androni
