= 2005 Vuelta a Venezuela =

Race details
- Dates: August 29 – September 11
- Stages: 14
- Distance: 1,983.9 km (1,232.7 mi)
- Winning time: 50h 38' 59"

Results
Jersey awarded to the overall winner	Winner	José Chacón Díaz (VEN)	(Gob Boliv. Car. Fundadeporte)
	Second	Artur García (VEN)	(Loteria del Táchira)
	Third	Iván Castillo (VEN)	(Gobernacíon del Zulía)
	Points	Gil Cordovés (CUB)	(Gobernacíon del Zulía)
	Mountains	José Alirio Contreras (VEN)	(Gobernación de Lara Alcaldía)
	Team	Lotería del Táchira	

The 42nd edition of the annual Vuelta a Venezuela was held from August 29 to September 11, 2005. The stage race started in Guanare, and ended in Carúpano.

== Final classification ==
RANK	NAME	TEAM	TIME
1.	José Chacón Díaz (VEN)	Gob Boliv. Car. Fundadeporte	50:38:59
2.	Artur García (VEN)	Loteria del Táchira	+ 0:28
3.	Iván Castillo (VEN)	Gobernacíon del Zulía	+ 1:58
4.	Jackson Rodríguez (VEN)	Loteria del Táchira	+ 1:59
5.	Marlon Pérez (COL)	Selle Italia Trecolli	+ 2:40
6.	José Serpa (COL)	Gobernacíon del Zulía	+ 3:45
7.	Olmedo Capacho (COL)	Gobernación de Lara Alcaldía	+ 3:50
8.	Richard Ochoa (VEN)	Gobernación del Estado Bolívar	+ 4:00
9.	Lizardo Benítez (CUB)	Cuban National Team	+ 4:11
10.	Franklin Chacón (VEN)	Gobernacíon del Zulía	+ 4:44
