= 1999 Vuelta a Venezuela =

Race details
- Dates: August 31 – September 12
- Stages: 13
- Distance: 1,845.5 km (1,147 mi)
- Winning time: 47h 37' 52"

Results
| Jersey awarded to the overall winner | Winner | Rui Lavarinhas (POR) | (Maia - Cin) |
| | Second | Martín Garrido (ARG) | (Matesica - Abóboda) |
| | Third | Jaime Pinzón (COL) | (Selle Italia) |
| | Points | Henry Menéses (VEN) | (Triple Gordo Gobernacíon) |
| | Mountains | Rodolfo Camacho (COL) | (Triple Gordo) |
| | Combination | Martín Garrido (ARG) | (Matesica - Abóboda) |
| | Team | (Venezuela) Lotería de Táchira | |

The 36th edition of the annual Vuelta a Venezuela was held from August 31 to September 12, 1999. The stage race started in Punto Fijo, and ended in Carúpano.

== 1999-08-31: Punto Fijo Circuito (125 km) ==
| Place | Stage 1 | | General Classification | |
| Place | Name | Time | Name | Time |
|---|---|---|---|---|
| 1. | Mario Figueroa (VEN) | 02:28.56 | Mario Figueroa (VEN) | 02:28.56 |
| 2. | Martín Garrido (ARG) | — | Martín Garrido (ARG) | +0.03 |
| 3. | Pablo Fernández (ESP) | — | Pablo Fernández (ESP) | +0.04 |

=== 1999-09-01: Falcón — Tucacas (205 km) ===
| Place | Stage 2 | | General Classification | |
| Place | Name | Time | Name | Time |
|---|---|---|---|---|
| 1. | Raúl Saavedra (VEN) | 05:39.28 | Mario Figueroa (VEN) | ??????? |
| 2. | Henry Menéses (VEN) | — | | |
| 3. | Pedro Cardozo (POR) | +1.13 | | |

=== 1999-09-02: Tucacas — San Felipe (150 km) ===
| Place | Stage 3 | | General Classification | |
| Place | Name | Time | Name | Time |
|---|---|---|---|---|
| 1. | Rui Lavarinhas (POR) | 03:36.25 | Pastor Linares (VEN) | ??????? |
| 2. | Jaime Pinzón (COL) | +0.11 | | |
| 3. | Pastor Linares (VEN) | +0.25 | | |

=== 1999-09-03: San Felipe — Acarigua (150 km) ===
| Place | Stage 4 | | General Classification | |
| Place | Name | Time | Name | Time |
|---|---|---|---|---|
| 1. | Gregorio Bare (URU) | 03:38.43 | Pastor Linares (VEN) | ??????? |
| 2. | Martín Garrido (ARG) | — | | |
| 3. | José Juan González (CUB) | — | | |

=== 1999-09-04: Acarigua — San Carlos (82 km) ===
| Place | Stage 5-A | | General Classification | |
| Place | Name | Time | Name | Time |
|---|---|---|---|---|
| 1. | Jorge Rodríguez (VEN) | 01:51.45 | Rui Lavarinhas (POR) | ??????? |
| 2. | Mario Figueroa (VEN) | — | | |
| 3. | Henry Menéses (VEN) | — | | |

=== 1999-09-04: San Carlos Circuito (83 km) ===
| Place | Stage 5-B | | General Classification | |
| Place | Name | Time | Name | Time |
|---|---|---|---|---|
| 1. | Manuel Guevara (VEN) | 01:45.23 | Rui Lavarinhas (POR) | ??????? |
| 2. | José Bruzual (VEN) | +0.01 | | |
| 3. | Jason McCarney (USA) | +0.03 | | |

=== 1999-09-05: San Carlos — San Juan de los Morros (195 km) ===
| Place | Stage 6 | | General Classification | |
| Place | Name | Time | Name | Time |
|---|---|---|---|---|
| 1. | Tommy Alcedo (VEN) | 04:42.41 | Rui Lavarinhas (POR) | ??????? |
| 2. | José Chacón Díaz (VEN) | +0.05 | | |
| 3. | Ramón Caballero (VEN) | +0.09 | | |

=== 1999-09-06: Ortiz — Chaguaramas (124 km) ===
| Place | Stage 7 | | General Classification | |
| Place | Name | Time | Name | Time |
|---|---|---|---|---|
| 1. | Gil Cordovés (CUB) | 03:11.46 | Rui Lavarinhas (POR) | ??????? |
| 2. | Arles Méndez (VEN) | — | | |
| 3. | Frederick Segura (VEN) | — | | |

=== 1999-09-07: Chaguaramas — Chaguaramas (33 km) ===
| Place | Stage 8 (Individual Time Trial) | | General Classification | |
| Place | Name | Time | Name | Time |
|---|---|---|---|---|
| 1. | Rui Lavarinhas (POR) | 00:40.20 | Rui Lavarinhas (POR) | ??????? |
| 2. | José Azevedo (POR) | +1.53 | | |
| 3. | Tommy Alcedo (VEN) | +2.39 | | |

=== 1999-09-08: Zaraza — Cantaura (128.5 km) ===
| Place | Stage 9 | | General Classification | |
| Place | Name | Time | Name | Time |
|---|---|---|---|---|
| 1. | Martín Garrido (ARG) | 03:47.17 | Rui Lavarinhas (POR) | ??????? |
| 2. | Mario Wynants (URU) | — | | |
| 3. | Mario Figueroa (VEN) | — | | |

=== 1999-09-09: Anaco — Cantaura (110 km) ===
| Place | Stage 10 | | General Classification | |
| Place | Name | Time | Name | Time |
|---|---|---|---|---|
| 1. | Julio César Blanco (VEN) | 02:36.39 | Rui Lavarinhas (POR) | ??????? |
| 2. | Ramón Caballero (VEN) | — | | |
| 3. | Carlos Maya (VEN) | — | | |

=== 1999-09-10: Anaco — Cumaná (192 km) ===
| Place | Stage 11 | | General Classification | |
| Place | Name | Time | Name | Time |
|---|---|---|---|---|
| 1. | Saúl Morales (ESP) | 04:20.57 | Rui Lavarinhas (POR) | ??????? |
| 2. | Pedro Cardoso (POR) | — | | |
| 3. | Gonçalo Amorim (POR) | — | | |

=== 1999-09-11: Cumaná — Carúpano (142 km) ===
| Place | Stage 12 | | General Classification | |
| Place | Name | Time | Name | Time |
|---|---|---|---|---|
| 1. | César Salazar (VEN) | 03:14.59 | Rui Lavarinhas (POR) | ??????? |
| 2. | Rodolfo Camacho (COL) | +0.10 | | |
| 3. | Robinson Merchán (VEN) | +0.43 | | |

=== 1999-09-12: Carúpano Circuito (140 km) ===
| Place | Stage 13 | | General Classification | |
| Place | Name | Time | Name | Time |
|---|---|---|---|---|
| 1. | Manuel Guevara (VEN) | 03:42.39 | Rui Lavarinhas (POR) | 47:37.52 |
| 2. | Julio César Blanco (VEN) | +0.04 | Martín Garrido (ARG) | +3.33 |
| 3. | Mario Wynants (URU) | +1.07 | Jaime Pinzón (COL) | +3.37 |

== Final classification ==
| RANK | NAME | TEAM | TIME |
|---|---|---|---|
| 1. | Rui Lavarinhas (POR) | Maia - Cin | 47:37.52 |
| 2. | Martín Garrido (ARG) | Matesica - Abóboda | + 3.33 |
| 3. | Jaime Pinzón (COL) | Selle Italia | + 3.37 |
| 4. | Robinson Merchán (VEN) | | + 4.47 |
| 5. | John Nava (VEN) | | + 4.51 |
| 6. | Rubén Rangel (VEN) | | + 5.00 |
| 7. | Tommy Alcedo (VEN) | | + 8.25 |
| 8. | Omar Pumar (VEN) | | + 10.42 |
| 9. | Danny Yépez (VEN) | | + 10.45 |
| 10. | Eduardo Guerrero (COL) | | + 11.41 |
