= Ribes (disambiguation) =

Ribes, a genus of about 200 known species of flowering plants.

Ribes may also refer to:

== Places ==
- Ribes, Ardèche, commune in southern France
- Vall de Ribes, region in Catalonia
- Sant Pere de Ribes, a town in the Barcelona province, Catalonia
- Ribes de Freser, a municipality in Girona, Catalonia

== Other uses ==
- Baldachin of Ribes, a fragmentary altar-canopy in the Romanesque style
- Ribes (surname)

== See also ==
- Rib (disambiguation)
