= Ribes (surname) =

Ribes is a Spanish surname. Notable people with the surname include:

- Alba Teruel Ribes (born 1996), Spanish professional racing cyclist
- Auguste Champetier de Ribes (1882–1947), French politician and jurist
- Daniel Lencina-Ribes (born 1977), Spanish former professional tennis
- David López Ribes (born 1972), Spanish painter and multidisciplinary artist
- Guillem de Ribes (1140–1220), Catalan nobleman and troubadour who once ruled a 12th-century castle located at Sant Pere de Ribes
- Jacqueline de Ribes (1929–2025), French aristocrat, designer, fashion icon, businesswoman, producer, and philanthropist
- Jean-Michel Ribes (born 1946), French playwright, screenwriter, theatre director, filmmaker, and actor
- Lola Ochoa Ribes (born 1978), Spanish wheelchair tennis player
- Manuel Bertrán de Lis y Ribes (1806–1869), Spanish politician who served twice as Minister of State
- Pau Ribes (born 1995), Spanish synchronised swimmer
- Salvador Blasco Ribes (1916–unknown), Spanish footballer
- Sonia Ribes-Beaudemoulin (born 1953), French biologist and oceanographer

== See also ==
- Ribes (disambiguation)
