= David López =

David López or Lopez may refer to:

== Spanish association footballers ==
- David López (footballer, born 1956) (Jorge David López Fernández), Spanish football midfielder
- David López (footballer, born 1982) (David López Moreno), Spanish football midfielder
- David López (footballer, born 1989) (David López Silva), Spanish football defensive midfielder and centre-back
- David López (footballer, born 2003) (David López Guijarro), Spanish football centre-back

== Others ==
- David López (artist) (born 1975), Spanish comic book artist
- David López (cyclist) (born 1981), Spanish road racing cyclist
- David López Ribes (born 1972), Spanish painter and multidisciplinary artist
- David Alonso López (1977–2017), Mexican boxer
- David L. Lopez (1809–1884), builder, industrialist, slave owner, philanthropist, and defender of the Confederacy
- Dave Lopez (born 1951), American telecommunications executive and Oklahoma secretary of state

== See also ==
- Davey Lopes (1945–2026), American baseball player and manager
- David Lopes (born 1982), Brazilian footballer
