= Paul Dangla =

French cyclist (1878–1904)

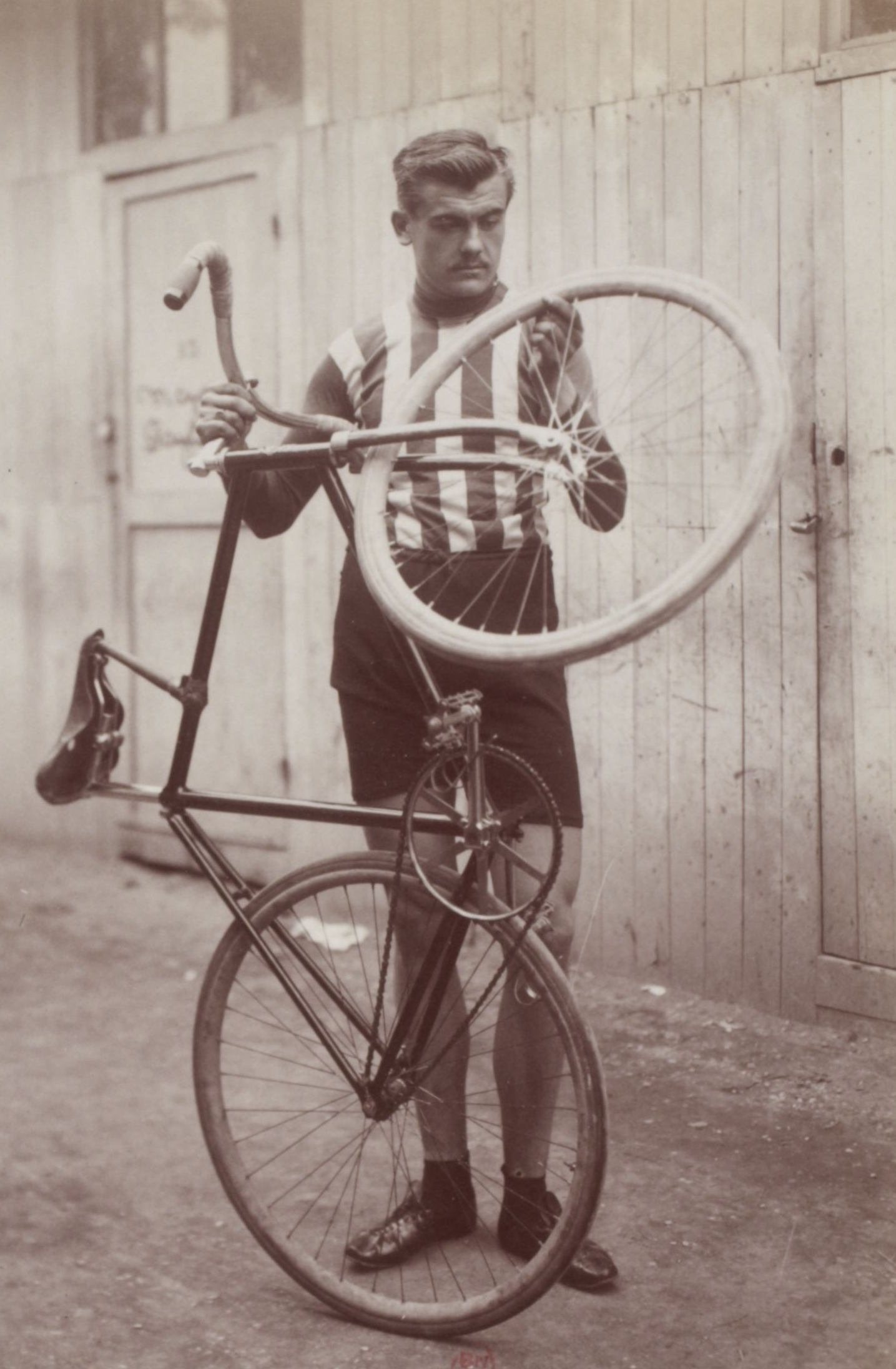
- Paul Dangla (1903)

Personal information
- Nationality: French
- Born: Léopold-Marie Dangla; 16 January 1878 Laroque-Timbaut, Aquitaine, France
- Died: 18 June 1904 or 25 June 1904 (aged 26) Magdeburg, Province of Saxony, Germany
- Resting place: Dolmayrac, France
- Years active: 1899-1904

Sport
- Sport: Road bicycle racing

Léopold-Marie "Paul" Dangla (Laroque-Timbaut, Aquitaine, 16 January 1878 – Magdeburg, Province of Saxony, 18 or 25 June 1904) was a French professional road bicycle racer.

Paul Dangla was born to Marie Pelegrin and Ferdinand Dangla. Ferdinand, a former gendarme, worked as a garde champêtre (rural guard) in his birthplace, Le Passage. A brother had died a year before Dangla's birth at the age of nine months. From 1896 Dangla gained a reputation in his home region as a good amateur in sprint and tandem races.

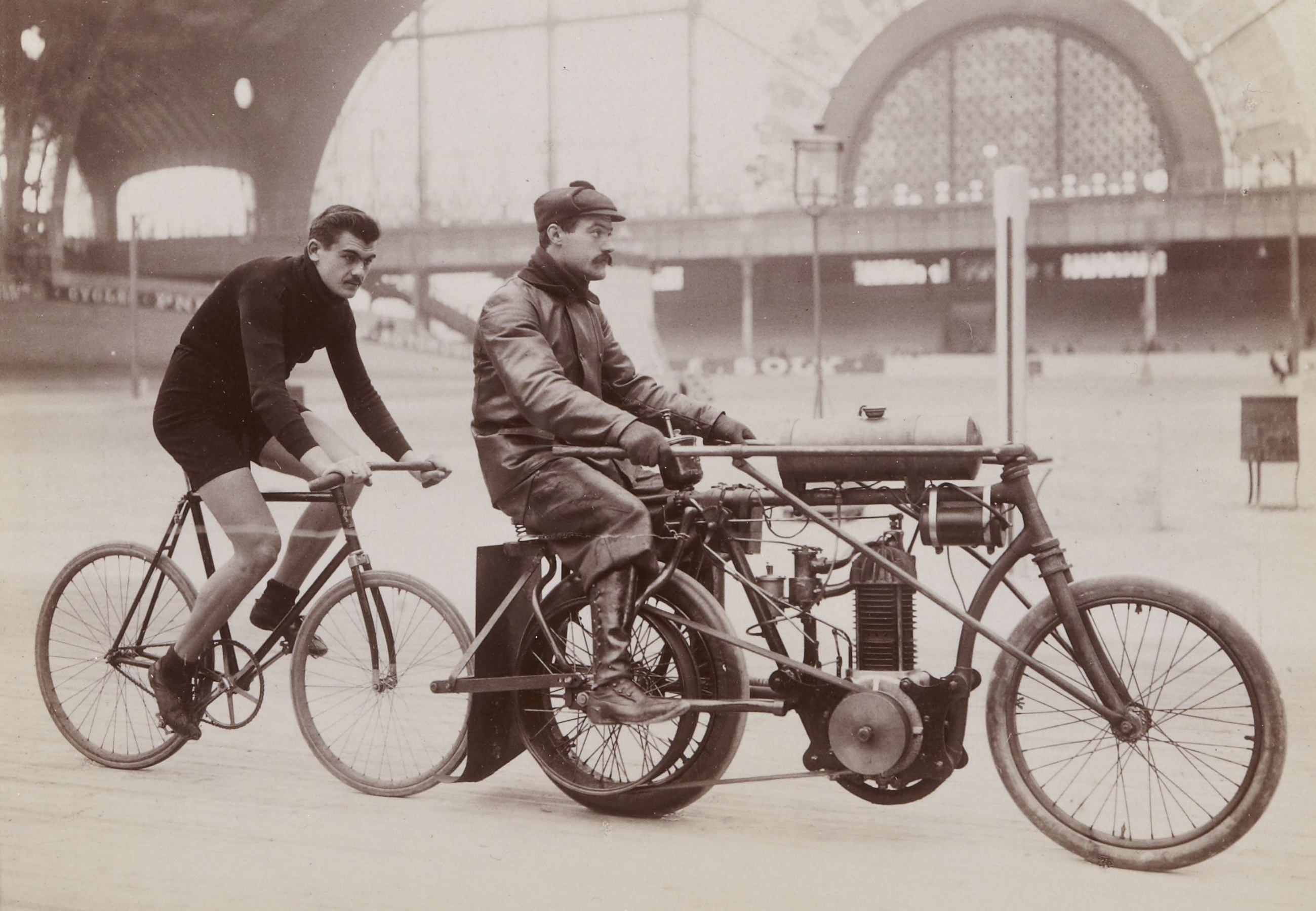
Paul Dangla behind pacemaker Marius Thé at the Vélodrome d'Hiver (1903/04)

In 1899 Paul Dangla, actually a trained accountant, went to Paris to start as a professional in motor-paced racing and became a popular local hero. He competed in non-medal cycling events at the 1900 Summer Olympics in Paris and placed second in the sprint event at the 1901 Grand Prix d'Angers.

After Dangla had beaten all the world records of the German Thaddäus Robl on 16 August 1903, he became a "national hero". On 18 October, he again set an hour record behind pacemakers over 84.577 kilometres (52.554 mi) at the Parc des Princes, as the August record had now been beaten by Tommy Hall of England.

In 1903 Dangla placed second in the motor-paced event at both the European Championship and French Championship. In April 1904, he was injured in a fall and unable to race for a month. On 12 June 1904, Dangla crashed at a speed of nearly 50 miles per hour (80 km/h) while racing in Magdeburg, shortly after winning the "Goldenen Rad von Magdeburg" (Golden Wheel of Magdeburg). He died two weeks later.

In Agen, a school was named after Dangla, "Collège Paul Dangla". As of 2016 the school still bore this name. For many years, the bicycle Dangla was riding when he had his fatal accident stood on his grave in the cemetery of Dolmayrac; on the occasion of the 100th anniversary of his death, it was to be placed in a glass display case. After this was announced in the press, the bike was stolen.

== See also ==
- List of racing cyclists and pacemakers with a cycling-related death
