= Chaguaramas =

Chaguaramas can refer to:

- Chaguaramas, Trinidad and Tobago
- Chaguaramas, Venezuela
