= Riber (surname) =

Riber is a surname. Notable people with the surname include:

- Hans Jørgen Riber (born 1964), Danish sailor
- John Riber, Indian-born Zimbabwean filmmaker and producer
- Jordan Riber, Tanzanian film maker, director, screenwriter, and sound engineer

== See also ==
- Ribes (surname)
