= Manuel Sanroma =

Spanish cyclist (1977–1999)

- Sanroma in 1999

Personal information
- Full name: Manuel Sanromà
- Born: 9 May 1977 Ciudad Real, Spain
- Died: 19 June 1999 (aged 22) Sant Pere de Ribes, Spain

Cycling career
- Sport: Cycling
- Discipline: Road
- Role: Rider
- Rider type: Sprinter

Professional team
- 1999: Fuenlabrada

Manuel Sanroma (9 May 1977 – 19 June 1999) was a Spanish racing cyclist.

In late 1998 he became a stagiaire in the Estepona team, winning three stages in the Vuelta a Venezuela. In 1999 he joined the Fuenlabrada team. In a stage in the Volta a la Comunitat Valenciana, he beat Mario Cipollini in the sprint.

He also won stages in the Volta ao Alentejo and the Vuelta a Asturias. In the Volta a Catalunya he started as a favorite for the second stage, but one kilometre before the finish in Vilanova i la Geltrú he fell head first on the curb stone. He died in an ambulance on his way to the hospital.

The only victory of the Fuenlabrada team that year after Sanroma's death was a stage win by Saúl Morales in the Vuelta a Venezuela. A year later, Morales died as well during an in-race accident.

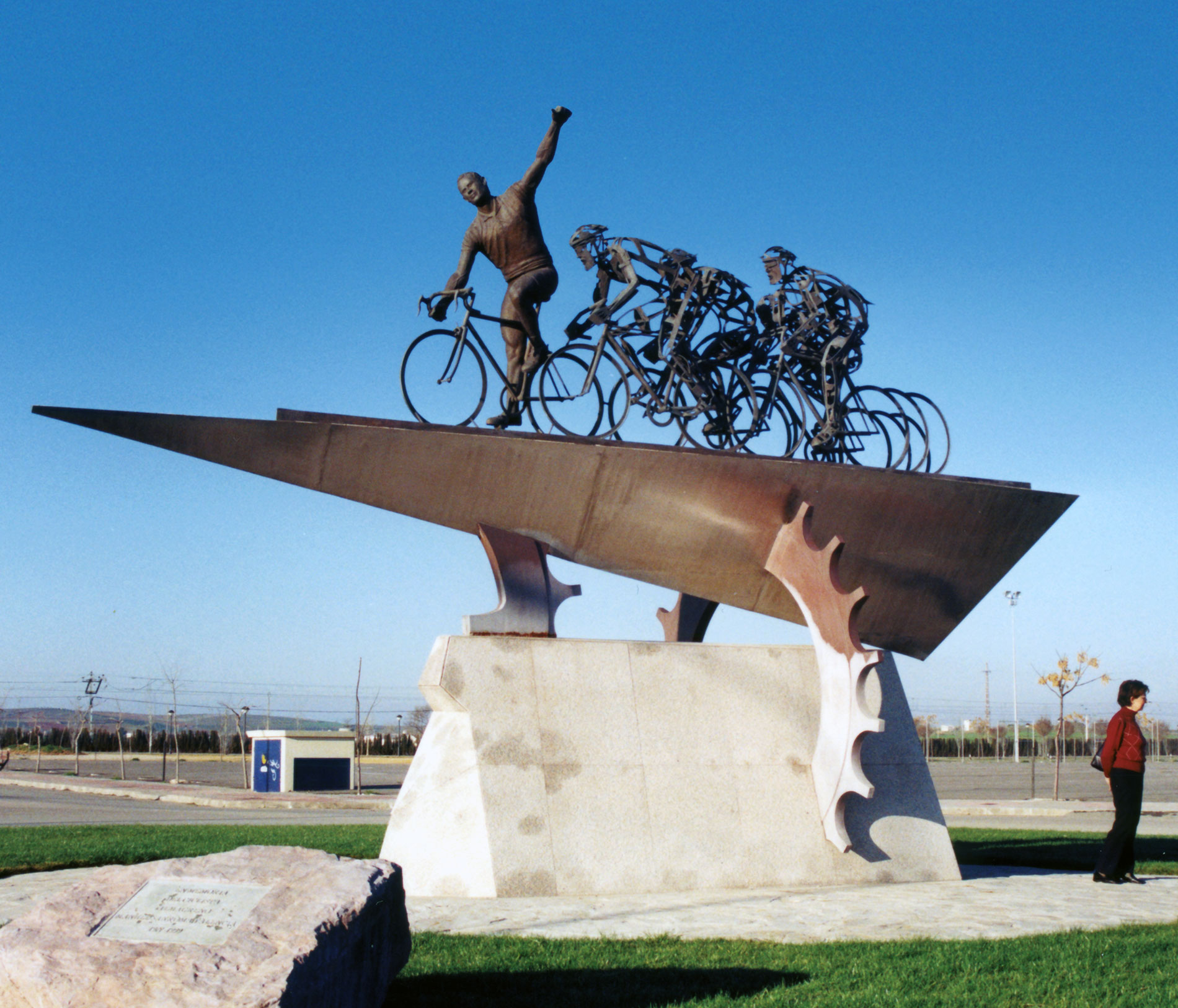
Manuel Sanroma monument in Almagro, Spain

== Major wins ==
1998
Vuelta a Venezuela

1st Stages 1 and 7

Volta ao Alentejo

1st Stage 2

4th Circuito de Getxo

1999
Vuelta a Asturias

1st Stages 2 and 4

Volta ao Alentejo
1st Points classification

1st Stages 1, 2, 3 and 6

1st Stage 1 Volta a la Comunitat Valenciana
4th Trofeo Manacor

== See also ==
- List of racing cyclists and pacemakers with a cycling-related death
