= Lycée Français Bel Air =

French international school in Spain

Location
- Ctra. C-246, km.42 - VILANOVETA 08812 Sant Pere de Ribes BARCELONA – ESPAÑA
- Coordinates: 41.2390448°N 1.7602653999999802°E

Information
- Website: ecole-belair.com

Lycée Français Bel-Air Garraf (Spanish: Liceo Francés Bel-Air Garraf), formerly École Française Bel Air (Spanish: Escuela Francesa Bel Air) is a French international school in Sant Pere de Ribes, Province of Barcelona, Catalonia, Spain. It serves petite section through terminale (final year of lycée, senior high school/sixth form). The classes at the lycée (upper secondary level) are taught with the National Centre for Distance Education (CNED) distance education programme. Garraf is a Catalan comarca.

It was created in 1992. The current campus opened in 1996. The current cycle 3 (years 3–5) primary school building opened in 2004, and an addition for cycle 2 (years 1–2) of primary school was installed in 2008.
