= Julio César Blanco =

Venezuelan cyclist (born 1976)

Julio César Blanco (born July 4, 1976) is a male professional road cyclist from Venezuela.

== Career ==
1998
1st in General Classification Vuelta al Táchira (VEN)
1999
1st in Stage 10 Vuelta a Venezuela, Cantaura (VEN)
