= Patricia Pepper =

British road cyclist

Personal information
- Born: 1936 Colchester, United Kingdom
- Died: 25 July 2006 (aged 70) Cambridge, United Kingdom

Cycling career
- Sport: Cycling
- Discipline: Road
- Role: Rider

Patricia Pepper also called Pat Pepper (1936 - 25 July 2006) was a British road cyclist. She competed seven times at UCI Road World Championships between 1962 and 1970, with her best result a 5th place in the 1963 UCI Road World Championships. She won medals at the British National Road Race Championships, placing 2nd in 1962, 1963, 1964 and placing 3rd in 1967, 1969, and 1972.

Pepper continued with competitive cycling as a master. In July 2006 she crashed during a competition on the road in Cambridge, and died a week later at the age of 70.

== Achievements ==
1960
3rd in British Best All Rounder, (London (F) (c)), London (Greater London), Great Britain

1962
2nd in National Championship, Road, Elite, Great Britain (F), Great Britain
3rd in British Best All Rounder, (London (F) (c)), London (Greater London), Great Britain

1963
2nd in National Championship, Road, Elite, Great Britain (F), Great Britain
3rd in British Best All Rounder, (London (F) (c)), London (Greater London), Great Britain

1964
5th in National Championship, Road, ITT, Elite, Great Britain (F), Kidlington (Oxfordshire), Great Britain
2nd in British Best All Rounder, (London (F) (c)), London (Greater London), Great Britain

1965
1st in Teplice Criterium, (Teplice (F)), Teplice (Ustecky Kraj), Czech Republic
2nd in Newbury R.C. Road Race, (Newbury (F) (a)), Newbury (Berkshire), Great Britain

1967
3rd in National Championship, Road, Elite, Great Britain (F), Great Britain

1969
3rd in National Championship, Road, Elite, Great Britain (F), Great Britain

1971
5th in part a Gemini B.C. Footscray Meadows Cyclo Cross, (Foots Cray, Cyclo-cross), Sidcup (Bexley), Great Britain
9th in part b Gemini B.C. Footscray Meadows Cyclo Cross, (Foots Cray, Cyclo-cross), Sidcup (Bexley), Great Britain

1972
3rd in National Championship, Road, Elite, Great Britain (F), Great Britain

1976
7th in part c London International Weekend, (London (F) (a)), Stratford (Greater London), Great Britain
7th in General Classification London International Weekend, (London (F) (a)), Stratford (Greater London), Great Britain
7th in National Championship, Road, Elite, Great Britain (F), Harrogate (North Yorkshire), Great Britain

== See also ==
- List of racing cyclists and pacemakers with a cycling-related death
