= Mario Figueroa =

Venezuelan road racing cyclist

Mario Figueroa (born December 24, 1963) is a retired male professional road racing cyclist from Venezuela.

== Career ==
1999
1st in Stage 1 Vuelta a Venezuela, Punto Fijo Circuito (VEN)
2000
1st in Stage 4 part b Vuelta a Venezuela, Valencia (VEN)
2001
1st in Sprints Classification Vuelta a Venezuela (VEN)
