= Saúl Morales =

Spanish cyclist (1973–2000)

- Morales in 1999

Personal information
- Born: 3 May 1973 Madrid, Spain
- Died: 28 February 2000 (aged 26) Caucete, Argentina

Cycling career
- Sport: Cycling
- Discipline: Road
- Role: Rider

Professional teams
- 1999: Fuenlabrada-Cafés Toscaf
- 2000: Relax-Fuenlabrada

Saúl Morales Corral (3 May 1973 – 28 February 2000) was a Spanish racing cyclist, who was born in Madrid.

Morales became a professional in 1999, at the Fuenlabrada team. That year his fellow team member Manuel Sanroma died during the Volta a Catalunya. Three years earlier, José Antonio Espinosa, another Fuenlabrada member, died as well. In 2000, during the Vuelta a la Argentina, he was hit by a truck that accidentally came between the riders. Out of protest, several European teams withdrew from the race; it has not been held since.

Morales' only victory was a stage in the 1999 Vuelta a Venezuela.

== Major wins ==
1999
Vuelta a Venezuela

1st Stage 13

2000
Trofeo Calvià

Challenge Volta a Mallorca | Mountain

== See also ==
- List of racing cyclists and pacemakers with a cycling-related death
