= Willy Schmitter =

German cyclist (1884–1905)

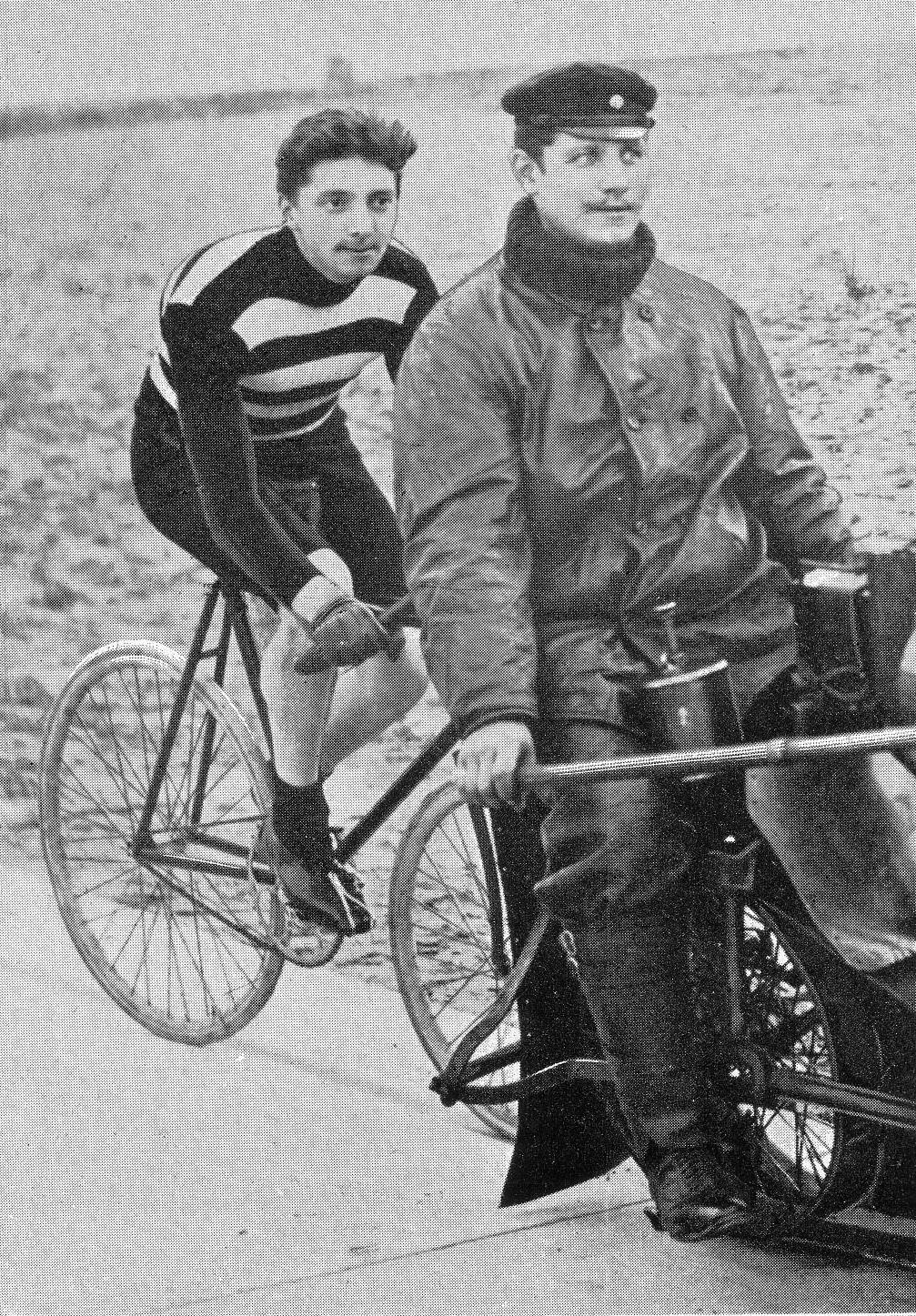
- Willy Schmitter following pacemaker Charles Peguy (1905)

Personal information
- Born: 8 February 1884 Mülheim, Germany
- Died: 18 September 1905 (aged 21) Leipzig, Germany

Sport
- Sport: Track cycling

Willy Schmitter (8 February 1884 – 18 September 1905) was a German cyclist.

Schmitter was a baker's son. After high school he started studying to be a pharmacist, but instead became a professional cyclist. In his first year as a professional he won 12 competitions and finished fourth at the UCI Track Cycling World Championships. In his last year of competition he won most of the races that he participated in.

During the 1905 European Track Cycling Championships in Leipzig on 18 September, the front tire of his bicycle exploded. He fell onto the track and was run over by a pacemaker behind him. With many broken bones and a skull fracture, he died later that night at the age of 21. His funeral procession was attended by fifty thousand people.

Journalist Fredy Budzinski published a biography of Schmitter in 1905 with the title “Willy Schmitter. Eine Biographie”.

== See also ==
- List of racing cyclists and pacemakers with a cycling-related death
