= Robinson Merchán =

Venezuelan cyclist

Personal information
- Born: 28 October 1964 (age 62) Caracas, Venezuela

Cycling career
- Sport: Cycling
Medal record
Representing Venezuela
Pan American Games
Gold medal – first place	1991 Havana	Road race

Robinson Reinaldo Merchán Useche (born 28 October 1964) is a male professional road racing cyclist from Venezuela. He competed in the individual road race at the 1992 Summer Olympics.

== Career ==
1990
7th in General Classification Tour of the Americas, Carolina (USA)
1991
(gold) in Pan American Games, Road, Havana (CUB)
1994
1st in General Classification Vuelta Internacional al Estado Trujillo (VEN)
1998
1st in General Classification Vuelta a la Independencia Nacional (DOM)
1st in Stage 6 Vuelta al Táchira, Palmira (VEN)
3rd in General Classification Vuelta al Táchira (VEN)
1999
4th in General Classification Vuelta a Venezuela (VEN)
2000
1st in Stage 9 Vuelta a Cuba, Santa Clara (CUB)
2002
1st in Clasico Ciudad de Valencia (VEN)
