= Martín Garrido =

Argentine road bicycle racer

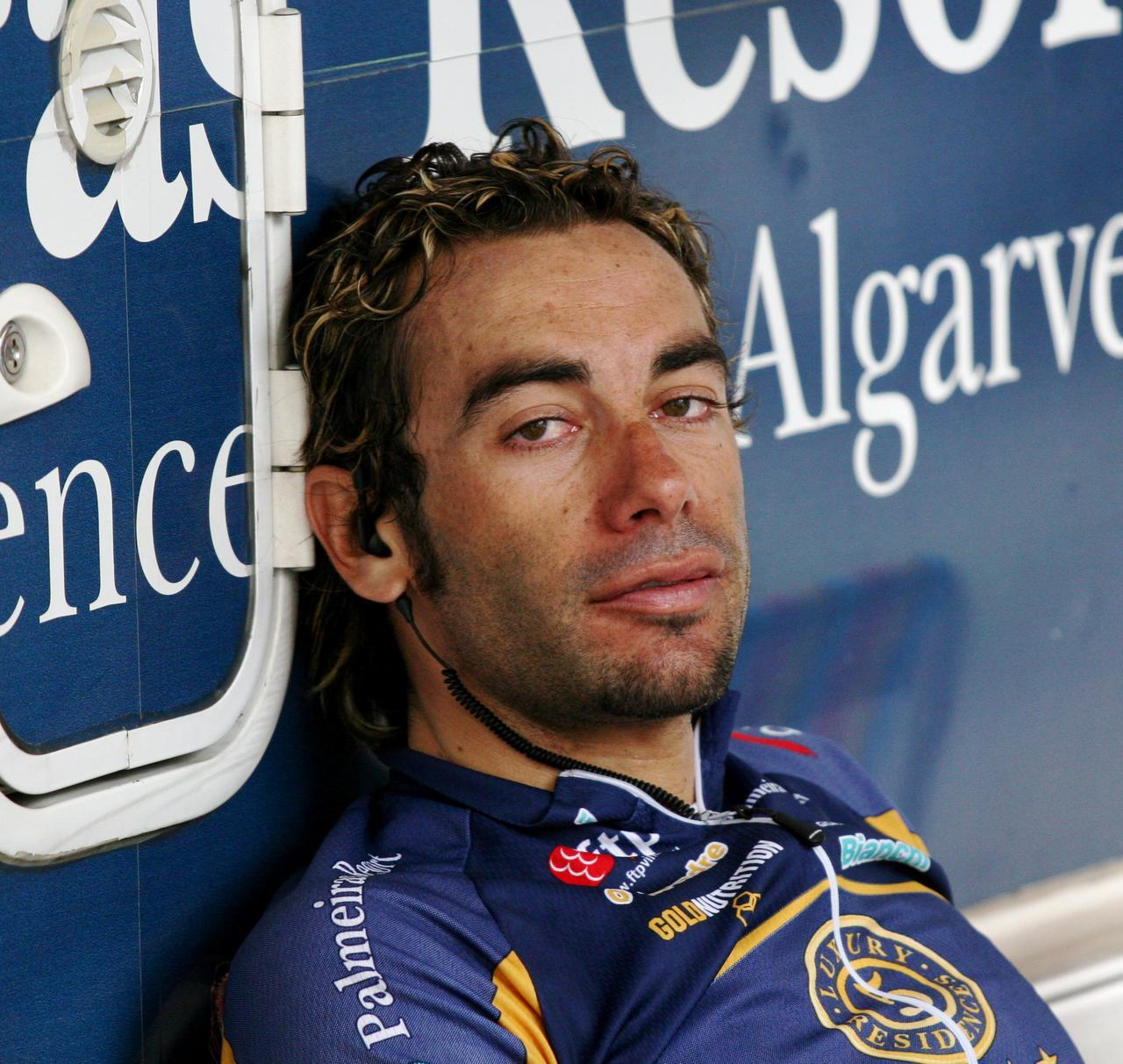

Personal information
- Full name: Martín Gerardo Garrido Mayorga
- Born: November 9, 1974 (age 51) Córdoba, Argentina

Cycling career
- Sport: Cycling
- Current team: Retired
- Discipline: Road
- Role: Rider
- Rider type: Sprinter

Professional teams
- 1999: Matesica–Abóboda
- 2000–2002: Colchon Relax–Fuenlabrada
- 2004: Barbot–Gaia
- 2005–2009: Duja–Tavira

Martín Garrido Mayorga (born November 9, 1974, in Córdoba, Argentina) is an Argentine former professional road racing cyclist.

== Major results ==
1999
2nd Overall Vuelta a Venezuela

1st Stage 9

2000
1st Stage 1 Vuelta a Galega
2001
1st Stage 3 Vuelta a Murcia
2004
1st Stage 3 GP Barbot
1st Stage 3 Volta ao Algarve
2005
Tour of Bulgaria

1st Stages 3, 4, 8 & 9

1st Prologue Tour de Normandie
2006
1st Stage 6 Tour of Bulgaria
1st Stage 3 Volta a Portugal
2007
1st Prologue Volta a Portugal
1st Stage 3 Volta ao Distrito de Santarém
2008
1st Overall Tour de San Luis

1st Prologue & Stage 3

1st Overall Vuelta del Este Córdobes
1st Stage 3 Boucles de la Mayenne
