= Chaguaramas Municipality =

Municipality of Guárico, Venezuela

Chaguaramas Municipality Municipio Chaguaramas
- Municipality
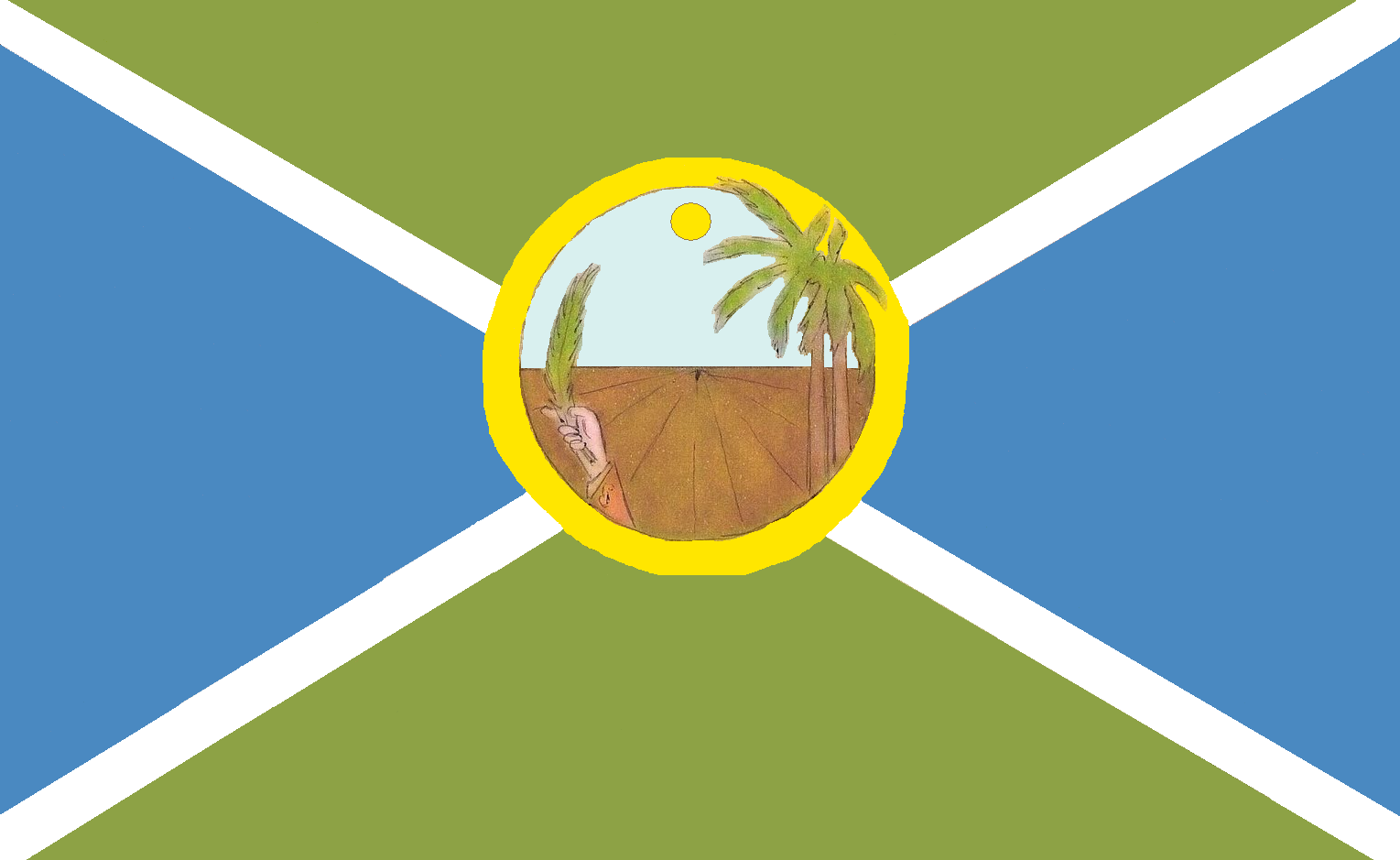
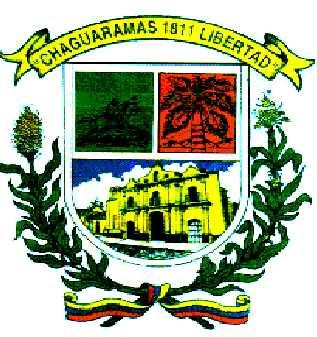
- Flag Coat of arms
- Interactive map of Chaguaramas Municipality
- Coordinates: 9°20′36″N 66°18′24″W
- Country: Venezuela
- State: Guárico

Area
  - Total: 2,069 km^{2} (799 sq mi)

Population (2014)
  - Total: 12,966
- Website: http://chaguaramas-guarico.gov.ve/portal-alcaldias/

Chaguaramas Municipality is one of the 15 municipalities of the state of Guárico, Venezuela. It has an area of 2,069 square kilometres (799 sq mi) and is estimated to have a population of 12,966 inhabitants as of 2011 according to the census. Its capital is the town of Chaguaramas in the east of the municipality.

The Chaguaramas Municipality is located in the north of the state in the Venezuelan Llanos. Agriculture is the basis of its economy.

== History ==
Chaguaramas was founded in 1653 by Bartolomé Belisario de la Madrid; the first site founded was Las Palmas, where the Casianero and Curipa hamlets are currently located.

The first mass was celebrated in 1728.

== Politics and government ==
=== Mayors ===
Period	Mayor	Political Party	% of votes	Notes
1989–1992	Pedro Aguilera Subero	COPEI	55.58	First mayor under direct elections
1992–1995	Luis Mejías	Democratic Action (AD)	33.82	
1995–1998	Carlos Jiménez Romero	COPEI		
1998–2000	Julia Martínez	COPEI		Early general elections were held in 2000 due to the approval of the 1999 Constitution
2000–2004	Carlos Jiménez Romero	Fatherland for All	53.86	Reelected
2004–2008	Mary Luz Pérez	Fatherland for All	52.07	
2008–2013	Yamilet Guevara	United Socialist Party of Venezuela	50.19	Municipal elections for 2012 were postponed by 1 year
2013–2017	Yovanny Rafael Salazar	Popular Will/Democratic Unity Roundtable	50.37	
2017–2021	Manuel García	United Socialist Party of Venezuela	85.25	
2021–2025	José Requena	Union and Progress Party	43.51	
