= Karel Verbist =

Belgian cyclist (1883–1909)

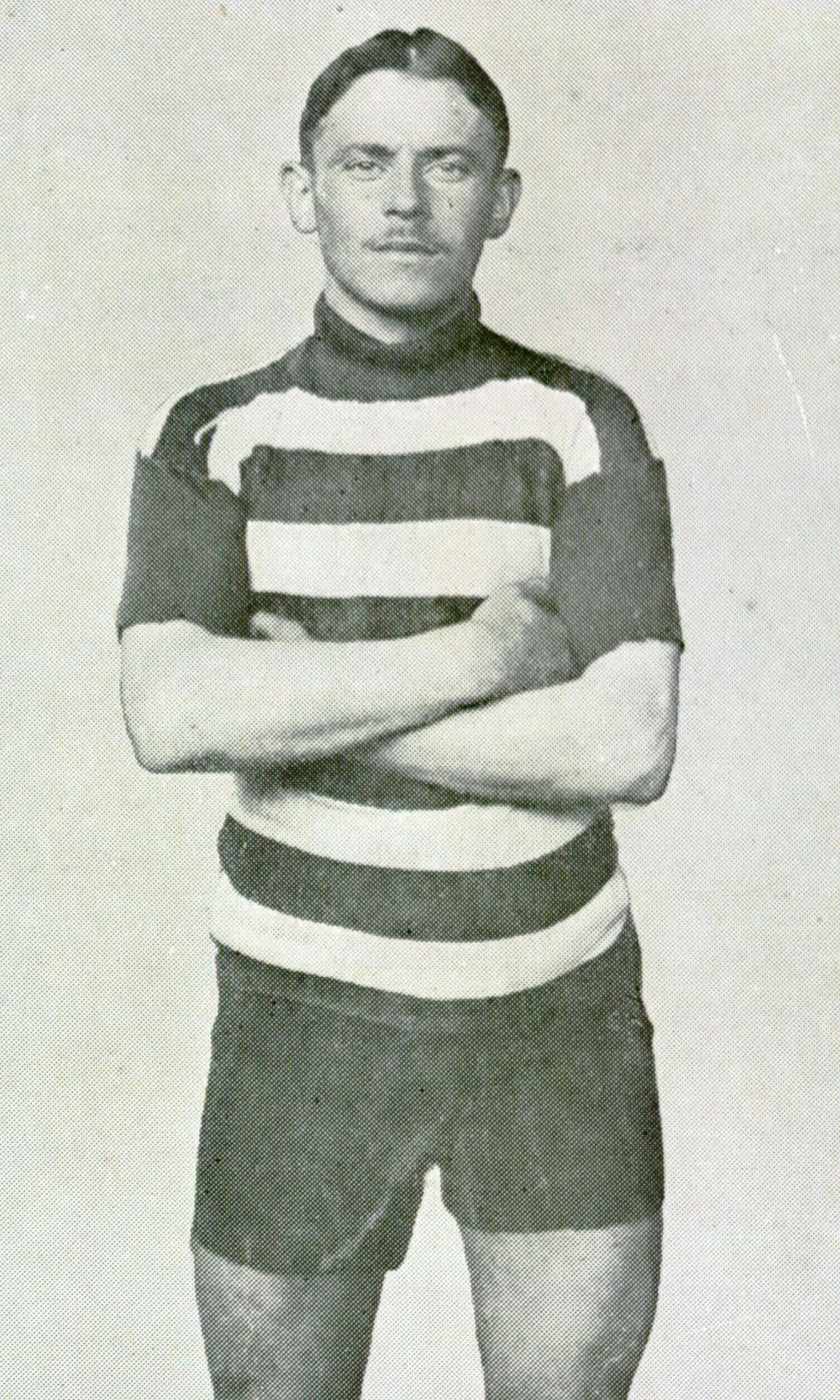

Personal information
- Born: 16 August 1883 Antwerp, Belgium
- Died: 21 July 1909 (aged 25) Brussels, Belgium

Cycling career
- Sport: Cycling
- Discipline: Track
- Role: Rider

Amateur team
- 1906: RCB

Professional team
- 1907-09: Individual

Major wins
- Belgian track championships (Motor-paced racing) (1908, 1909)

Karel Verbist (16 August 1883 – 21 July 1909) was Belgian National Stayers Champion in 1908 and 1909.

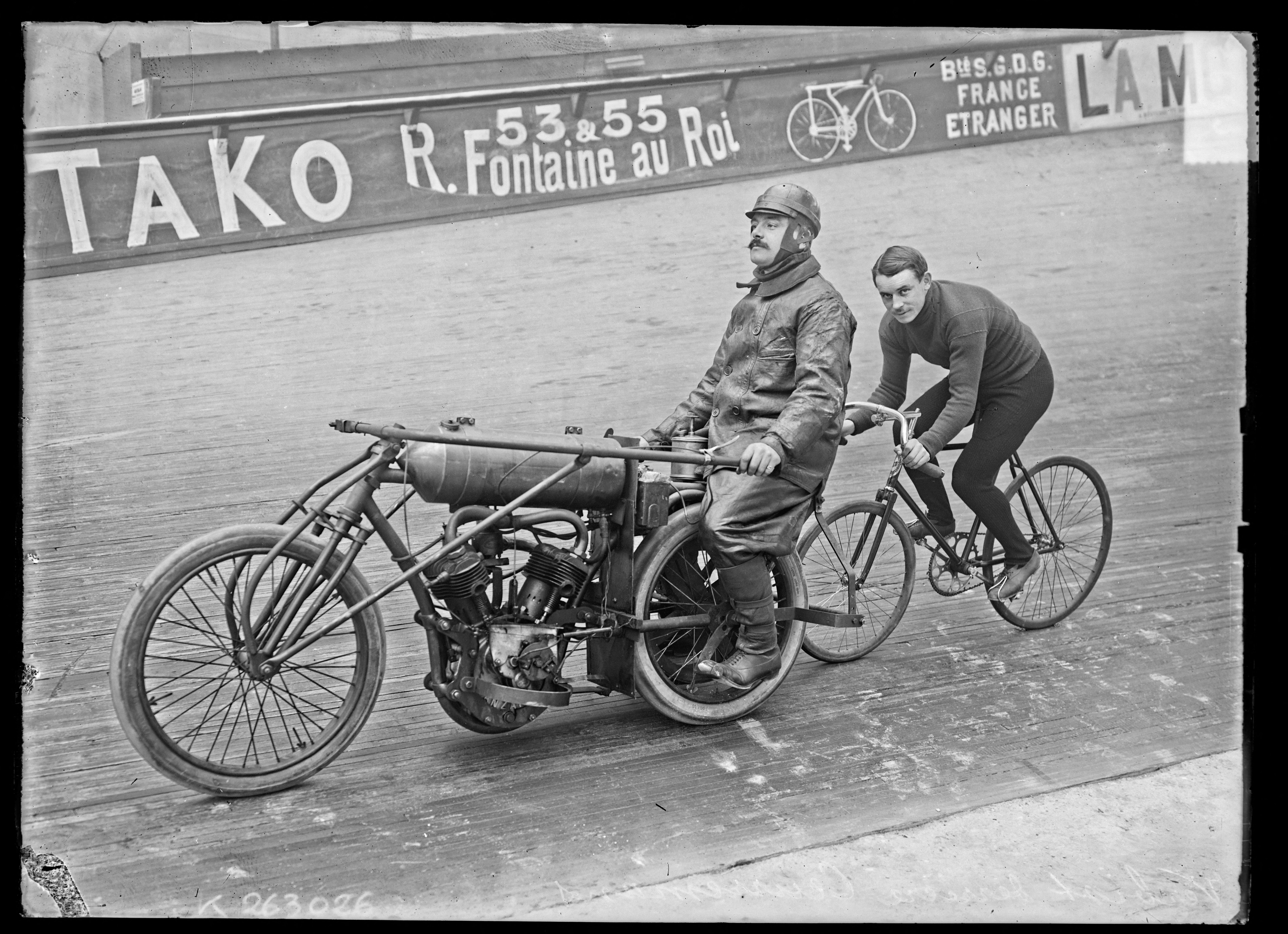
Verbist behind his pacemaker Ceurremans

On July 21, Verbist collided with the motorcycle of Constant Ceurremans (his pacemaker) on the track in Brussels and died almost immediately. Verbist is the subject of a macabre Flemish folk-poem... "Chareltje, Chareltje Verbist, hadt ge niet gereden op de pist(e), hadt ge niet gelegen in de kist." which roughly translates to "Verbist, if you hadn't ridden your bike, you may not have ended up in a coffin."

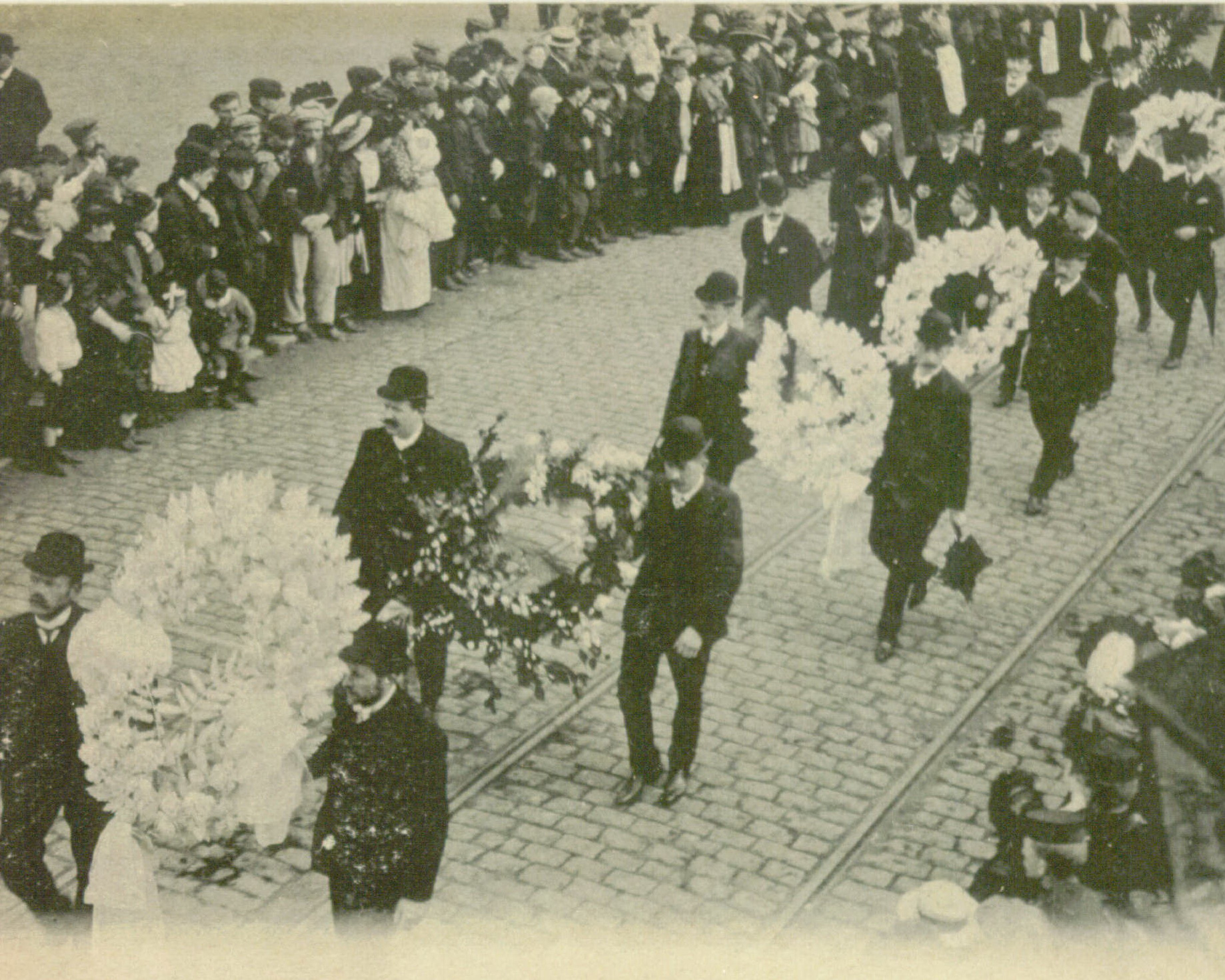
Funeral of Verbist

== Achievements ==
1907
1st Spring GP Munich
1st GP Munich
1st Autumn Fair Leipzig Stayers prize
1st European Grand Prix over one hour
1st GP Antwerp Motor-paced racing
2nd UCI Motor-paced World Championships, Île-de-France, Professional motor-paced racing

1908
1st National Track Championships, Antwerp, Motor-paced racing

1st Spring GP Hanover
1st Golden Cup Cologne
1st European Grand Prix over 100 km, Dresden
1st GP Germany 1/2 long distance, Düsseldorf
1st Siebengebirge Prize, Cologne
1st Derby Germany, Cologne
1st Steglitz hourly race
2nd international Spring Prize, Leipzig

1909
1st National Track Championships, Brussels, Motor-paced racing
1st Breslau (Dolnoslaskie)

== See also ==
List of racing cyclists and pacemakers with a cycling-related death
