= List of racing cyclists and pacemakers with a cycling-related death =

List of deaths of cyclists during competition or training

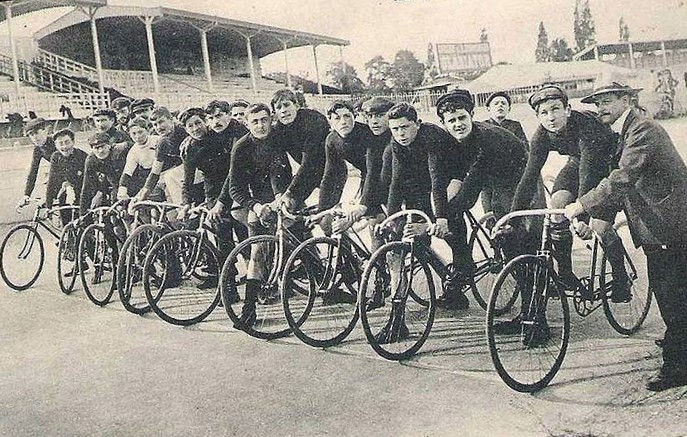
Parc des Princes Velodrome, site of Breton's 1902 death (c. 1900 postcard)

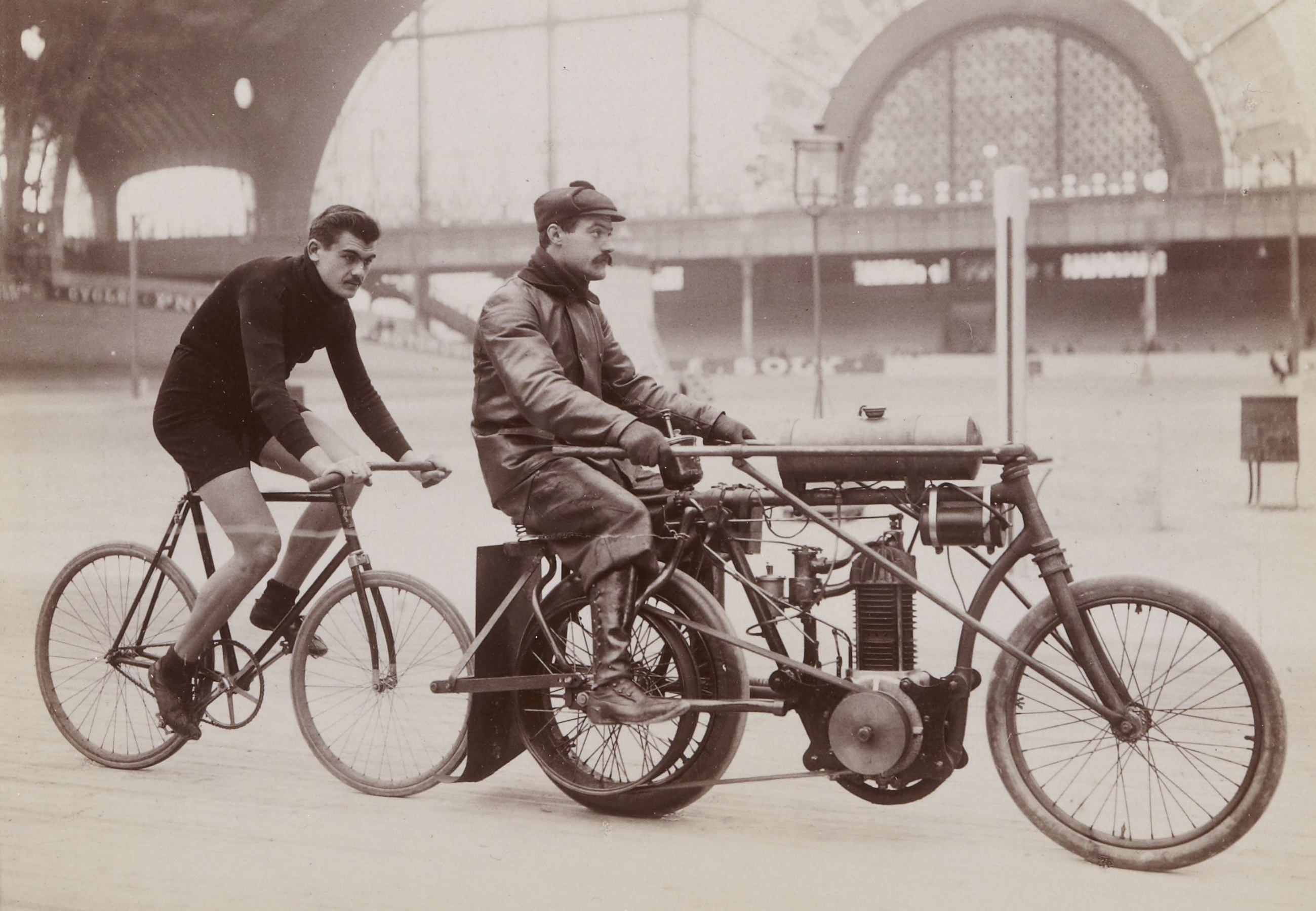
The cyclist Paul Dangla and his pacemaker teammate Marius Thé in the Vélodrome d'Hiver (c. 1903)

The first documented deaths of competitive cyclists during competition or training date to the 1890s and early 1900s when the recently invented safety bicycle made cycling more popular, both as a sport and as a mode of transport. The athletes listed here were either professional cyclists, professional pacemakers or well-known competitive amateurs who had a cycling-related death, mostly during a race or during training. Pacemakers are motorcyclists utilized in motor-paced racing, riding motorcycles in front of their cycling teammates to provide additional speed to those cyclists via the resulting slipstream.

Safety has been a concern since cycling's early days. By 1929, at least 47 people had died while racing at velodromes – 33 cyclists and 14 pacemakers. (Note: The total includes the professional pacemakers (14) and riders (33) but does not include injuries/deaths of bystanders. On page 101 Mangan recounts some details of the infamous 1909 Friedenau (Berlin) track accident with nine spectators being killed and 52 others injured. Other sources refer to the July 18, 1909 disaster happening at the "Botanical Garden" track or Botanischer Garten track.) Motor-paced cycling still exists in the modern era as keirin racing and derny racing. A number of professionals and competitive amateurs have been killed in crashes with motorized vehicles while training on public roads plus there is a growing number of cyclists who have died of heart attacks while cycling in a race or while training. Some of these deaths affect cycle racing afterwards – the death of Andrey Kivilev in a crash during the 2003 Paris–Nice race caused the Union Cycliste Internationale to institute a mandatory helmet rule.

The dangers of the various sporting forms of cycling continue to be an issue, including training on public roadways. A survey of 2008 Olympics teams, however, indicated that cycling was not even in the top six most injury-prone sports during competition that year. Racing cyclists who have died during a race or during training are remembered by cycling aficionados and the cycling press. Their personal effects are exhibited in museums, their cemetery markers and tombstones are visited by fans, and as one commentator wrote: "Plaques, statues and shrines to cycling's fallen heroes are scattered all over Europe's mountain roads, turning any ride into a pilgrimage."

== Cyclists who died during a race or because of a crash that happened during a race ==
=== 1890 to 1999 ===
Cyclists who died during a race
| Name | Image | Competitive status | Date of death | Nationality | Location of death and additional information |
|---|---|---|---|---|---|
| Pierre Froget | — | Track cyclist | August 21, 1894 | France | Crashed at the Velodrome in Vichy while tandem racing as a track cyclist. Died six days later at the age of 21, was the first death in a cycling crash on a French track. |
| Bert Harris | — | Track cyclist | April 21, 1897 | United Kingdom | While participating in a race at Aston on Easter Monday of 1897 Harris' cycle touched another rider and he was upset head-first onto the track's surface. Harris died a few days later, never having regained consciousness. Tens of thousands of mourners lined the streets of Leicester for his funeral procession. |
| Muller | — | Pacemaker | 1899 | German Empire | Muller died at the scene after a fall during a competition on the winter track in Hamburg. Kocher, the cyclist following him, decided to quit cycling. |
| Harry Miles William Stafford | — | Pacemakers | May 31, 1900 | United States | During a race at the Waltham, Massachusetts track, four tandem-motorcycles crash. Pacemakers Miles and Stafford, both 25 years old, are killed in the crash. |
| Oscar Aaronson (Note: Some sources spell Oscar Aaronson's last name as "Aronson".) | — | Track cyclist | December 22, 1900 | Sweden | Injured during December 16, 1900 competitors' crash at the New York City/Madison Square Garden Six-Day Race. Died on the 22nd from aftereffects of the crash, from exhaustion and pneumonia. |
| Johnny Nelson | — | Track cyclist | September 6, 1901 | USA | Nelson was a professional cyclist originally from Chicago. On September 4, 1901 he was in a 15-mile match race with Jimmy Michael at Madison Square Garden. Two miles into the race a tire on Nelson's pacemaker's vehicle exploded. Nelson then collided with the vehicles of both his pacemaker and Michael's pacemaker. Nelson's leg was badly lacerated in the crash and he suffered a massive blood loss. He died two days later in Bellevue Hospital. |
| Charles Kerff | — | Road cyclist | May 18, 1902 | Belgium | Kerff crashed during the French cycling classic Marseille–Paris in which his brother Marcel also participated. The cause was unknown but Kerff had no visible injuries and was unconscious immediately after the crash. He was taken to the hospital in Aix-en-Provence but was dead on arrival. |
| Harry Elkes | A man on his bicycle headed towards the camera | Track cyclist | May 30, 1903 | United States | Died in a crash at Charles River Track in Cambridge, Massachusetts. Held the world record for "paced-cycle racing" during most of his career and just prior to his fatal crash had achieved a new 5 Miles World Record (going that distance in 6 minutes, 12 1/5 seconds) as well as achieving world's records for 10 and 15 miles. Major Taylor in his autobiography called Elkes "one of the greatest middle-distance riders that ever pedalled a bicycle." |
| Alfred Görnemann | A picture of a man beside a bike | Track cyclist | October 11, 1903 | German Empire | Collided with his pacemaker during an October 11, 1903 race on the Dresden track and died that evening. |
| Jules Oreggia | — | Track cyclist | May 15, 1904 | France | Died during a stayers race at the Marseille velodrome |
| Pilack | — | Track cyclist, pacemaker | June 16, 1904 | German Empire | Died at the track while acting as a pacemaker during a race |
| Paul Dangla | A man holding up a bike | Track cyclist | June 1904 (Note: Dangla's date of death is variously reported as June 12, June 24 and June 26, 1904.) | France | Died from injuries he received in a crash on a track at Magdeburg, Germany. |
| Karl Käser | A male cyclist standing next to his bike in a crowd | Track cyclist | August 14, 1904 | German Empire | Was killed during a paced race between himself and Thaddeus Robl at the Plauen track in Saxony, Germany. Was utilizing a 24-inch tire on a 22-inch wheel and in the moments before his fatal crash Käser had just pushed back his safety helmet. (Note: The reference Sport-Album der Rad-Welt" was an annual compendium of the sports-newspaper Rad-Welt or "Bike World" which included a column, "Die Toten der Rennbahn" (or "The Dead of the Racetrack") that consisted of obituaries for dead cyclists.) (Note: Some sources spell Käser's name as "Carl Kaeser" see "Trove"/The Sydney Mail reference.) |
| George Leander | A male cyclist getting an assisted push from a pedestrian | Track cyclist | August 23, 1904 | United States | Died as a result of injuries during a race at the Parc des Princes track (or velodrome) in Paris. Had been going 92 kmh/57 mph at the time. |
| Jimmy Michael | Black & white studio portrait of a man | Road and track cyclist | November 1904 | United Kingdom | Died November 20, 1904 as a result of the injuries he received in a crash at a Berlin track a year or two before (Note: Sources differ on whether the accident happened in 1902 or in 1903.) where his skull was fractured. It is thought that Michael probably had some kind of brain damage from the fall, as afterwards he suffered from severe headaches, had partial paralysis of his face, and had lapses of memory. Michael was en route from the UK to the United States on the ocean steamer "Savoie". The night before he died Michael complained of feeling sick and nauseous, telling the ship's doctor that his symptoms were the result of the Berlin track crash. Some sources state he died from alcoholic delirium tremens or a brain hemorrhage. |
| Charles Albert Brécy | Posed photos of a male cyclist on a bicycle in a studio | Track cyclist | November 25, 1904 | France | Crashed into his pacemaker's motorcycle when the engine failed, died eleven days later. The crash occurred during an attempt to break the Paced Hour Record (meaning how much distance could be achieved within an hour) at the Parc des Princes velodrome. (Note: The accident took place on November 14, Brecy died on November 25 after lingering for 11 days.) |
| Hubert Sevenich | Male cyclist on a bicycle in a crowd of pedestrians | Track cyclist | May 7, 1905 | German Empire | Sevenich's sixth stayer competition as a professional was the Grand Prix of Brunswijk on 7 May 1905. During the race a pacer's motorcycle collided with others on the track and Sevenich was crushed to death against the track's guardrail. |
| Willy Schmitter | A male cyclist behind a pacemaking motorcycle during a race | Track cyclist | September 18, 1905 | German Empire | Suffered a skull fracture in a crash during the European Championship at the Leipzig track and died a few hours afterwards |
| Gustav Freudenberg | A male cyclist riding his bicycle on a track | Track cyclist | April 29, 1906 | German Empire | Collided with a pacemaker's motorcycle at the track in Magdeburg. An artery in his right leg was torn open and he died at the track as a result of his injuries. |
| Richard Huhndorf | A male cyclist riding his bicycle | Track cyclist and stayer | July 22, 1906 | German Empire | Fatally injured during a 100 km race, the Kleinen Golden Rad von Halle |
| Charles Péguy | A male cyclist behind a man on a pacemaking motorcycle | Track cyclist, pacemaker | June 9, 1907 | France | Died in a crash on the Spandau Track in Berlin. |
| Louis Mettling | A male cyclist headed directly toward the camera | Track cyclist | June 21, 1907 | United States | Died in his sleep on June 21 as a result of a crash during a 50-mile pace-following race on the Dresden track June 9, 1907 |
| Josef Schwarzer | A man standing comfortably | Pacemaker | August 30, 1907 | German Empire | Düsseldorf track |
| Moritz Hübner | A man with a wreath around his neck | Track cyclist | October 13, 1907 | German Empire | During "Die Goldpokal", a 100 km stayers' race, Hübner fell to the track when his pacing motorcycle broke down, then was fatally injured when a succeeding cycle ran over his body. |
| Gustav Schadebrodt | A man on a pacer-motocycle and a male cyclist | Track cyclist | October 22, 1907 | German Empire | Died in a crash at the Brandenburg track with his brother Otto as pacemaker. The two Schadebrodt brothers were a team, Otto Schadebrodt the pacemaker riding a motorcycle in front and Gustav riding his bicycle behind. |
| Ernst Wolf | A man sitting on a motorcycle | Pacemaker | October 29, 1907 | German Empire | While standing at the edge of the Dresden Track, Wolf was run over by a fellow pacemaker. |
| Karel Verbist | A man in a bicycle racing uniform standing comfortably | Track cyclist | July 21, 1909 | Belgium | Verbist collided with his pacemaker's (Constant Ceurremans') motorcycle on the Bruxelles track. Verbist is the subject of a macabre Flemish folk-poem... "Chareltje, Chareltje Verbist, hadt ge niet gereden op de pist(e), hadt ge niet gelegen in de kist." which roughly translates to "Verbist, if you hadn't ridden your bike, you may not have ended up in a coffin." |
| Fritz Theile | A male cyclist on a bicycle | Track cyclist | June 4, 1911 | German Empire | Zehlendorf Velodrome |
| Hans Bachmann | — | Pacemaker | 1913 | German Empire | Velodrome Hall |
| Hans Lange | — | Track cyclist | 1913 | German Empire | Velodrome Hall |
| August Kraft | — | Track cyclist | July 25, 1913 | German Empire | Strasbourg, France |
| Richard Scheuermann | A male cyclist on a bicycle looking up at the camera | Track cyclist | September 8, 1913 | German Empire | Killed almost instantly during a 100-kilometer event on the Cologne track. Gus Lawson, Paul Guignard's pacemaker, lost control of his pacemaking motorcycle when the back tire blew out. Emil Meinhold, Scheuermann's pacemaker, then collided – at 50 mph on his motorcycle – straight into the wreckage. Scheuermann and Lawson were both killed almost instantly. Meinhold was mistakenly reported in the newspapers of the day to have died (which error has been repeated in modern references) but he recovered from his injuries and was involved in the cycling world for many years afterwards. |
| Gus Lawson | A man wearing a long coat standing near a racetrack | Pacemaker | September 8, 1913 | United States | Killed immediately in a multi bicycle–motorcycle crash on the Cologne track during a 100-kilometer event. (See Richard Scheuermann 'Notes' above) |
| Max Hansen | — | Track cyclist | October 12, 1913 | German Empire | Berlin Velodrome Stadium |
| Piet van Nek sr. (Note: Piet van Nek Sr.'s name is also rendered in some sources as "Piet van Neck".) | aA male cyclist posed riding on his bike and looking sideways at the camera. | Track cyclist | April 14, 1914 | Netherlands | Injured and died as a result of a tire blow-out on the Leipzig track during the inaugural Grote Oostprijs, a 100+ km race. van Nek's Amsterdam artistic gravesite marker is a well-known monument in Amsterdam. |
| Willy Hamann | — | Track cyclist | July 21, 1914 | German Empire | Treptow track. The crash occurred on July 15, Hamann died six days later in hospital. |
| Max Bauer | — | Pacemaker | 1917 | German Empire | Treptow track |
| Jacob Esser | — | Track cyclist | July 8, 1917 | German Empire | Died shortly after a crash at the Düsseldorf Germany track that happened when one of his tires blew out |
| Louis Darragon | A man in a cycling uniform standing beside his bicycle on a racetrack | Track cyclist | April 28, 1918 | France | Died in a crash on the track of the Vélodrome d'Hiver Paris. |
| Peter Günther | Studio portrait of a man wearing a cap | Track cyclist | October 7, 1918 | German Empire | Günther died the day after an October 6 crash at a track in Düsseldorf. He was involved in a collision with his pacemaker's motorcycle after the motorcycle's rear tire burst. |
| Hans Schneider | — | Track cyclist | January 1920 | Weimar Republic | |
| Emanuel Kudela | Male cyclist on a bicycle headed straight toward the camera | Track cyclist | September 22, 1920 | Weimar Republic | Olympia track, Berlin |
| Christian Oorlemans (Note: Some sources spell the name as "Christiaan Orlemans".) | — | Pacemaker | August 22, 1922 | Netherlands | Died in a crash during a track race at Amsterdam's "Het Stadion". Thousands attended Oorlemans' funeral procession. |
| Walter Ebert | — | Track cyclist | June 1, 1924 | Weimar Republic | Magdeburg track |
| Gustave Ganay | Seated man in cycling uniform | Track cyclist | August 23, 1926 | France | Stayer. Died from a fall at the Parc des Princes. The crash was immortalized by Ernest Hemingway in A Moveable Feast with "where we saw that great rider Ganay fall and heard his skull crumple under the crash helmet as you crack an hard-boiled egg against a stone to peel it on a picnic." |
| Franz Krupkat | Man on a bike with flowers | Track cyclist | June 1, 1927 | Weimar Republic | Leipzig track |
| Ernst Feja | — | Track cyclist | June 1, 1927 | Weimar Republic | Crashed while training on the concrete track at Oerlikon in Zurich |
| Constant Ceurremans | Constant Ceurremans | Pacemaker | June 18, 1931 | Belgium / Netherlands | Died in a crash on the track at Cologne. Also involved in Karel (Charles) Verbist's fatal crash in 1909 |
| Werner Krüger | An old postcard showing a pacemaker and a male cyclist | Pacemaker | July 21, 1931 | Weimar Republic | Died after a fall on the Cologne-Riehl track during a stayer race, while riding as a pacemaker for Emil Thollembeek Was a survivor of the 1909 Friedenau disaster. |
| Georg Pawlack (Note: Pawlack is also rendered as "Georg Klein Bohrau Pawlack".) | — | Track cyclist | June 10, 1933 | Nazi Germany | Run over by a pacemaker after his bicycle slipped on a rain-soaked track |
| Georges Lemaire | Three men standing with a bicycle | Road cyclist | September 29, 1933 | Belgium | Died in a crash during the Belgian club championship road race in Uccle, Belgium. (Note: Per Cycling Archives, this race is also known as the "Inter Clubs Championship" and took place in Uccle, Belgium.) |
| Emil Richli | Standing man | Track cyclist | May 13, 1934 | Switzerland | Track championships |
| Francisco Cepeda | — | Road cyclist | July 14, 1935 | Spain | Tour de France. "Fell down a ravine near Bourg-d'Oisans", died while making the Col du Galibier descent. |
| Giulio Bartali | 2 men standing next to a bike | Road cyclist | June 14, 1936 | Italy | Brother and training partner of 1938 and 1948 Tour de France winner Gino Bartali. Giulio and Gino Bartali were participating in a regional championship race in Florence, the Targa Chiari, when a car drove onto the course and mowed Giulio down. He died two days later in hospital, never having regained consciousness. |
| Len Johnson | — | Track and road cyclist | August 8, 1936 | Australia | Melbourne to Sale Race. Johnson was riding on the Princes Highway, when he slowed due to a puncture and was hit by a truck laden with timber. |
| Stefan Veger | — | Track cyclist | November 1936 | Netherlands | Track Gent |
| André Raynaud | Man in a cycling suit wearing a leather helmet | Track cyclist | March 1937 | France | A world champion stayer, Raynaud died during an Antwerp Sportpaleis track race. |
| Adrien Buttafochi | Buttafocch in the 1934 Tour de France | Road cyclist | July 6, 1937 | France | As he was descending the Col Esteret pass during the Grand Prix d'Antibes, Buttafocchi crashed into a wayward vehicle driving up the hill. He lingered in a coma for a few days before dying. |
| Hefty Stuart | — | Road and track cyclist | December 9, 1938 | Australia | Riding in a motor pacing event, Walter "Hefty" Stuart's front tire blew out, causing him to fall and he was run over by a following pacing motorcycle. Stuart died in hospital two weeks later. |
| Jean Alavoine | Male cyclist posed riding a bicycle | Road cyclist | July 18, 1943 | France | Alavoine's professional career lasted from 1908 until 1925, he won 17 Tour de France stages along the way. In 1943 at the age of 55 he died during a veterans race in Argenteuil. |
| Richard Depoorter | — | Road cyclist | June 16, 1948 | Belgium | Crashed into a tunnel wall on a descent of the Sustenpas near Bern, during the Tour of Switzerland, died onsite or shortly thereafter of his injuries. |
| Léon Level | Three male cyclists standing in a row | Road and track cyclist | March 26, 1949 | France | Fractured his skull in a crash and died at the Parc des Princes track in Paris. |
| Paul Chacque | — | Road and track cyclist | September 1949 | France | Died when he fractured his skull during a race at the "Parc des Princes" track in Paris |
| Paul Kroll | — | Road and track cyclist | November 8, 1949 | Germany | Died in a crash during a Berlin 1000 laps race at the Funkturm track (Note: When Walter Rutt (the former world champion) wrote to the "American Bicyclist and Motorcyclist (Volume 71)" published in 1950, he referred to this race not as the actual Six-Day Race but as a 'team race that was run before' it and that this team race was of a 'A Thousand Laps' (150 km) variety.) |
| Gerard van Beek | A man being carried by several other men on a racetrack | Road cyclist | March 15, 1951 | Netherlands | Died of a skull fracture suffered during the Berlin Six-Day race held in March (Note: There were two Berlin Six-Days races run in 1951, one in March and one in December. Van Beek died while racing the March 1951 Berlin Six-Day and Rudi Mirke died during the December Six-Day. There is some confusion in sources about which race Mirke and van Beek died in. The Berlin official visitors bureau website, for instance, has the two men involved in the same fatal collision.) |
| Camille Danguillaume | A male cyclist in a cycling uniform looking into the uniform | Road cyclist | June 26, 1951 | France | Killed in collision with press motorcycle during Critérium International (Championship of France) |
| Serse Coppi | — | Road cyclist | June 29, 1951 | Italy | Crashed near the end of the 1951 Tour of Piedmont (aka "Tour du Piedmont" and "Giro del Piemonte") on June 28. Finished race but then died the next day. |
| Rudi Mirke | — | Road cyclist | December 10, 1951 | Germany | Berlin Six Day. Died after falling during the race. |
| Orfeo Ponsin | — | Road cyclist | May 20, 1952 | Italy | Crashed in the fourth stage of the 1952 Giro d'Italia. Died in hospital that evening. |
| Erich Metze | — | Road and track cyclist | July 28, 1952 (Note: Metze's date of death is reported in sources as being in two different months in 1952 – July 28 (CyclingArchives.Com, American Bicyclist and Motorcyclist) and also as May 28(Radsportseiten.net, ProCyclingStats.com)) | Germany | Metze suffered three skull fractures during his long career, which stretched from 1930 until 1952. The last one was fatal and occurred during a race on the Erfurt cycle track. |
| Stan Ockers | A male cyclist looking over his shoulder | Road and track cyclist | October 1, 1956 | Belgium | During a track race at the Sportpaleis Antwerp, the 1955 road race world champion didn't see that Ernest Sterckx had returned to the track after a mechanical failure. Ockers looked back and drove full into his opponent. He fell into a coma and died 2 days later. (Note: Ockers crashed on September 29 and died two days later, thousands of people took to the streets for his funeral.) |
| Joaquín Polo | — | Road cyclist | August 4, 1958 | Spain | Died of heatstroke during the 1958 Tour of Portugal |
| Raúl Motos | — | Road cyclist | August 4, 1958 | Spain | Died of heatstroke during the 1958 Tour of Portugal |
| Russell Mockridge | Two male cyclists in profile | Road cyclist | September 13, 1958 | Australia | Tour of Gippsland. |
| Willy Lauwers | — | Road cyclist | April 1959 | Belgium | Lauwers died at the age of 22 in an accident during a motor-paced race in the Tirador de Palma Velodrome. He had won the first leg of the race and fell in the 46th lap of the second. Lauwers, who was riding at a speed of over 70 km per hour, suddenly lost his balance and fell on the track and was then hit by the motorbike of rider Pedro Gomila who followed him from a short distance. He died in hospital, half an hour after the accident. |
| Kiyoshi Kitazawa | | Track cyclist | May 1959 | Japan | All-Star Keirin, taking place at the Osaka Nagai Velodrome |
| Knud Enemark Jensen | — | Road cyclist | September 1960 | Denmark | Jensen collapsed during the 100-kilometer team time trial at the 1960 Summer Olympic Games, suffering a skull fracture and dying several hours later. Some commentators state that Jensen's autopsy revealed traces of drugs in his system but the Italian authorities' 1961 report stated that the official cause of death was heatstroke. A race-day temperature of 40 degrees Celsius/104 degrees Fahrenheit and Jensen's post-crash care (being kept in a "hot military tent"), could have been probable contributing factors. |
| Alessandro Fantini | — | Road cyclist | May 5, 1961 | Italy | Died after a crash at the end of the sixth stage of the 1961 Tour of Germany |
| Shosuke Fukushima | | Track cyclist | April 30, 1967 | Japan | All-Star Keirin, taking place at the Kishiwada Velodrome Fell off his bike, where he died of skull fracture. |
| Tom Simpson | Tom Simpson in his 1966 cycling uniform | Road cyclist | July 13, 1967 | United Kingdom | Fell unconscious from his bike on the ascent up Mont Ventoux during the Tour de France, after suffering heart issues, heatstroke, the aftereffects of taking amphetamine and other medical issues. He died shortly afterwards in hospital, near where his famous memorial stands. (Note: The circumstances surrounding Simpson's death were controversial. The autopsy report said that drugs (amphetamines) were found in his system but judged the overall cause of death as being a combination of heatstroke, oxygen depletion and physical exertion. The temperature that day was 45 degrees Celsius/113 degrees Fahrenheit in the shade – the heat combined with the exertion of getting up Ventoux plus riders' dehydration (since they were limited on water intake by Tour rules) were all contributing factors.) |
| Masamitsu Nakamura | | Track cyclist | August 1967 | Japan | National Prefectural Keirin Championship, Shizuoka Velodrome His and Fujishima's death at a high-profile race (the equivalent of today's GI) led to wider rule revisions by NJS to improve safety. |
| Valentín Uriona | — | Road cyclist | July 30, 1967 | Spain | Spanish Championship |
| José Samyn | — | Road cyclist | August 28, 1969 | France | Zingem, Belgium |
| Radamés Treviño | — | Road and track cyclist | April 12, 1970 | Mexico | Crashed during a regional race between Pachuca and Mexico City. |
| Jean-Pierre Monseré | Two men in conversation, one of them holding a toddler | Road, Track cyclist | March 15, 1971 | Belgium | The 22-year-old 1970 world champion died during a local race in Lille, Antwerp when he collided head-on with a car that had entered the course. On impact, he hit his head in the windscreen, killing him instantly. (Note: Wilcockson refers to the race as "a kermesse race at Retié".) |
| Manuel Galera (Note: Sources refer to this cyclist as Manuel Galera and as Manuel Galera Magdaleno.) | Male cyclist on a bicycle | Road cyclist | February 14, 1972 | Spain | Tour of Andalusia |
| Graeme Jose | — | Road cyclist | June 23, 1973 | Australia | While taking part in a race in Feldkirch Austria, he ran into the rear of a parked tray-topped lorry and was killed. |
| Juan Manuel Santisteban (Note: Maneul's last name is also sometimes spelled as "Santiesteban".) | A man in a Monte Verde cycling jersey | Road cyclist | May 21, 1976 | Spain | Giro d'Italia. Died as a result of injuries when his head struck a crash barrier. |
| Karl Kaminski | Cyclists racing on a banked track | Road and track cyclist | October 8, 1978 | East Germany | Leipzig |
| Joaquim Agostinho | Male cyclist in 1974 Bic team uniform | Road cyclist | May 10, 1984 | Portugal | During the Tour of Algarve. Died ten days after colliding with a dog which had run onto the race-course. |
| Emilio Ravasio | — | Road cyclist | May 28, 1986 | Italy | Died in a hospital after a fall at the 1986 Giro d'Italia. |
| Vicente Mata | — | Road cyclist | February 17, 1987 | Spain | Trofeo Luis Puig. Died after colliding with a car during race. |
| Michel Goffin | — | Road cyclist | February 27, 1987 | Belgium | Tour du Haut-Var in Marseilles France. Goffin crashed and, after spending six days in a coma, died from his injuries. |
| Connie Meijer | — | Road cyclist | August 17, 1988 | Netherlands | Died during a criterium in the Netherlands |
| Noriyuki Tonai | | Track cyclist | May 17, 1992 | Japan | Fukui Velodrome |
| Fabio Casartelli | A memorial plaque with a photo in the middle | Road cyclist | July 18, 1995 | Italy | Tour de France. |
| José Antonio Espinosa (Note: Espinosa is also known as "José Antonio Espinosa Hernandez".) | — | Road cyclist | November 1996 | Spain | Criterium at Fuenlabrada (Note: Espinosa's accident and death occurred during a team time trial ("el Criterium de Fuenlabrada").) |
| Isamu Narishima | | Track cyclist | July 24, 1998 | Japan | Tachikawa Velodrome |
| Manuel Sanroma | — | Road cyclist | June 19, 1999 | Spain | Had a major crash 1 km from the end of a stage in the Volta a Catalunya and died at a nearby hospital |

=== 2000 to 2009 ===
Cyclists who died during a race
| Name | Image | Competitive status | Date of death | Nationality | Location of death and additional information |
|---|---|---|---|---|---|
| Saúl Morales (Note: Some sources render this cyclist's name as Saúl Morales Corral.) | — | Road cyclist | February 28, 2000 | Spain | Hit by truck during the 2000 Tour of Argentina |
| Nicole Reinhart | — | Road and track cyclist | September 17, 2000 | United States | Died as a result of a single-bike crash when she hit a tree during the 2000 BMC Tour event in Arlington/Boston. |
| Masaharu Hattori | | Track cyclist | January 3, 2003 | Japan | 2R, A-class race; Ito Onsen Velodrome. Collapsed during cool down lap after finishing fourth. Was already in cardiac arrest when doctors arrived. Later died in hospital. |
| Andrey Kivilev | | Road cyclist | March 12, 2003 | Kazakhstan | Crashed during the 2003 Paris–Nice and died the next morning. Kivilev was not wearing a helmet. After his death, the wearing of helmets became compulsory in all official UCI races. |
| Juan Barrero | — | Road cyclist | June 11, 2004 | Colombia | Crashed during a stage of the Vuelta a Colombia ("Tour of Colombia") on a high-speed descent early on in the stage. Barrero died in hospital shortly thereafter. |
| Tim Pauwels | — | Cyclo-cross rider | September 26, 2004 | Belgium | Passed out during an early-season cyclo-cross race in Erpe-Mere, Belgium and crashed. Some sources say that Pauwels' heart had stopped before the crash. |
| Alessio Galletti | — | Road cyclist | June 15, 2005 | Italy | Died of a heart attack 15 km from the finish line of the Subida al Naranco |
| Patricia Pepper | — | Road cyclist | July 25, 2006 | United Kingdom | At 70 years of age, while competing in a time trial her bike and another bike collided — she died in hospital nine days later. |
| Isaac Gálvez | — | Road cyclist | November 26, 2006 | Spain | Six Days of Ghent. Galvez died after coming into contact with Dimitri De Fauw and then crashing into a track railing. |
| Bruno Neves | — | Road cyclist | May 11, 2008 | Portugal | Classica de Amarante. Neves' collapse from heart failure caused him to crash during the race. |
| Kei Uchida | | Track cyclist | September 11, 2008 | Japan | 7R of S-class qualifying race during the first day of the All-Star Keirin at the Ichinomiya Velodrome. During the penultimate part of the decisive lap, whilst attempting to pass, Uchida was nudged into one side by an overtaking rider, who then rebounded into another rider, forcing him to rear back. This caused the spokes of Uchida's bicycle to collapse, throwing him over the handlebar face-first, striking his face onto the ground. He died in hospital hours later. By then, Uchida was the 48th cyclist to die in accidents in the history of professional keirin, also the 4th to die in a GI graded event. |

=== 2010 to 2019 ===
Cyclists who died during a race
| Name | Image | Competitive status | Date of death | Nationality | Location of death and additional information |
|---|---|---|---|---|---|
| Terumitsu Nakagaki | | Track cyclist | February 15, 2010 | Japan | 3R, A-class qualifying race, Hiroshima Velodrome. During the closing lap, he began to lose pace and collapsed where he was taken into hospital. He had already been in cardiac arrest and died shortly after. |
| Thomas Casarotto | — | Road cyclist | September 10, 2010 | Italy | During the Giro del Friuli Venezia Giulia at Pesariis, Casarotto hit the wing mirror of a SUV parked on the course and then crashed. He died September 15, 2010, of head injuries and trauma. |
| Wouter Weylandt | A man in sunglasses and a cycling uniform | Road cyclist Leopard Trek | May 9, 2011 | Belgium | Fatal crash on the Passo del Bocco during the third stage of the 2011 Giro d'Italia |
| Teruo Sakamoto | — | Track cyclist | July 7, 2012 | Japan | 9R, A-class qualifying race, Odawara Keirin Velodrome. Crashed into a timing equipment used for photo finishes, after swerving inward to avoid a fallen rider whilst fighting for the lead. Died in hospital. |
| Wouter Dewilde | — | Road cyclist | March 1, 2013 | Belgium | Dewilde was involved in a fatal crash during a regional event for elite racing cyclists without a contract, Brugge (West-Vlaanderen), Belgium |
| Junior Heffernan | — | Road cyclist | March 3, 2013 | Ireland | Died after collision with a car during the Severn Bridge Road Race in Gloucestershire |
| Marcelo Graces | — | Road cyclist | March 31, 2013 | Uruguay | Graces was involved in a fatal crash during last stage of Vuelta Ciclista del Uruguay after collision with a motorcycle during the time trial final stage of the race |
| Jeanné Nell | — | Track cyclist | February 11, 2014 | RSA | Died in Cape Town, South Africa, during a keirin race |
| Annefleur Kalvenhaar | — | Mountain biker | August 23, 2014 | Netherlands | Died in Grenoble, France, due to a crash during a UCI World Cup XCE race in Méribel, France |
| Will Olson | — | Enduro/mountain bike rider | August 2, 2015 | USA | Died in Crested Butte during an Enduro World Series race |
| Antoine Demoitié | Male cyclist wearing a colorful uniform | Road cyclist Wanty–Groupe Gobert | March 27, 2016 | Belgium | Died in hospital in Lille, due to injuries sustained in a crash during the Gent–Wevelgem race. Having been one of a group of cyclists who fell as the race went through Sainte-Marie-Cappel, he was struck by a motorbike accompanying the race. |
| Daan Myngheer | A man wearing a cycling windbreaker smiling into the camera | Road cyclist Roubaix–Métropole Européenne de Lille | March 28, 2016 | Belgium | Died in hospital two days after suffering a heart attack during first stage of Critérium International |
| Gijs Verdick | — | Road cyclist Cyclingteam Jo Piels | May 9, 2016 | Netherlands | Died a week after suffering two heart attacks at the Under-23 Carpathian Couriers Race in Poland. |
| Bahman Golbarnezhad | Male cyclist in the Uniform of the Iranian Paralympic Team riding a bicycle | Road cyclist | September 17, 2016 | Iran | 2016 Summer Paralympics. Had a head injury after colliding with a rock midway through the C4 road race of the Paralympics. Subsequently had cardiac arrest and died on the way to hospital. |
| Eslam Nasser Zaki | — | Road and track cyclist | March 20, 2017 | Egypt | Suffered a fatal heart attack while riding in the omnium event at the African Continental Track Championships at the Cyril Geoghegan Velodrome in Durban, South Africa. He was a member of the Bahraini VIB Bikes road race team. |
| Mike Hall | Mike Hall, seated, at a table with a microphone in his hand, before a 2015 race | Road endurance cyclist | March 31, 2017 | United Kingdom | Died after being struck by a car on the outskirts of Canberra, Australia. He was in second place in a 3,300-mile race, the Indian Pacific Wheel Race, which was subsequently cancelled. |
| Chad Young | Male cyclist in Team USA cycling uniform | Road cyclist Axeon–Hagens Berman | April 28, 2017 | United States | Received severe head injuries in a fall on a descent during the final stage of the Tour of the Gila into Pinos Altos, New Mexico and died in hospital in Tucson five days later. |
| Casey Saunders | — | Road cyclist | June 25, 2017 | United States | Died after crashing in the Pro-1-2 criterium at Tour of Kansas City |
| Ray Dare | — | Road cyclist | July 19, 2017 | United Kingdom | Died after being rear-ended by a vehicle on the A41 near Aylesbury while attempting a 10 mile national record for his age (91) in a time trial. |
| Mathieu Riebel | — | Road cyclist Shell Pacific team | October 20, 2017 | France | Died instantly in a collision on the descent of the Col de La Pirogue during Stage 9 of the Tour de Nouvelle-Calédonie |
| Michael Goolaerts | A man in a cycling uniform and suncap | Road cyclist Vérandas Willems–Crelan | April 8, 2018 | Belgium | During the Paris–Roubaix classic, Goolaerts suffered a cardiorespiratory arrest on the third cobbled sector at Saint-Python, after 109 km of racing. He was resuscitated by paramedics and transferred by helicopter to CHRU-Hospital in Lille, although he died later that day. |
| Stef Loos | — | Road cyclist Acrog-Pauwelssauzen-Balen team | March 18, 2019 | Belgium | Died after colliding with a van on the Mémorial Alfred Gadenne after a group of three riders took the wrong turning at a junction |
| Robbert de Greef | A male cyclist in partial uniform casually looking into the camera | Road cyclist Alecto Cycling Team | April 25, 2019 | Netherlands | Suffered cardiac arrest during the Omloop van de Braakman race |
| Bjorg Lambrecht | A male cyclist standing in full cycling uniform | Road cyclist Lotto–Soudal | August 5, 2019 | Belgium | Crashed into a concrete culvert during stage three of the 2019 Tour de Pologne. He was taken to a hospital by ambulance and died during surgery. |

=== 2020 to present ===
Cyclists who died during a race
| Name | Image | Competitive status | Date of death | Nationality | Location of death and additional information |
|---|---|---|---|---|---|
| Suleiman Kangangi | closeup of man wearing a racing helmet and smiling broadly | Road / gravel cyclist | August 27, 2022 | Kenya | Kangangi was killed in a high speed crash while riding in a gravel race in Vermont. |
| Gino Mäder | | Road cyclist Team Bahrain Victorious | June 16, 2023 | Switzerland | Gino Mäder died following a crash on the descent of the Albula Pass on stage 5 of the Tour de Suisse. |
| André Drege | | Road cyclist Team Coop–Repsol | July 6, 2024 | Norway | Drege died during the descent of the Grossglockner High Alpine Road on stage 4 of the 2024 Tour of Austria. |
| Muriel Furrer | | Road cyclist | September 27, 2024 | Switzerland | Furrer died following a crash at the 2024 UCI Road World Championships. She died the next day in the hospital of Zürich. |
| Samuele Privitera | | Road cyclist | July 16, 2025 | Italy | Privitera died after a crash in Giro Ciclistico della valle D'Aosta. |
| Iván Meléndez Luque | | Road cyclist | August 23, 2025 | Spain | 17-year-old Iván Meléndez Luque (Team Tenerife-Cabberty) was implicated in a mass crash during the 2nd stage of the Spanish junior race Vuelta Ciclista Junior a la Ribera del Duero and died on the way to the hospital. |
| Kevin Bonaldo | — | Road cyclist | October 24, 2025 | Italy | Bonaldo suffered cardiac arrest at the end of the Piccola Sanremo of Sovizzo |
| Cristian Camilo Muñoz | | Road cyclist | April 24, 2026 | Colombia | Muñoz died at a hospital in Oviedo due to an infection following a knee injury sustained during a fall at the Tour du Jura. |
| Finlay Tarling | | Road cyclist | August 14, 2026 | United Kingdom | Tarling was killed in a collision during the eighth stage of the 2026 Volta a Portugal. The incident involved a car outside the race convoy that was driving in the opposite direction. |

== Cyclists who died during training ==
The following athletes died while individually training for competitions or during scheduled breaks while participating in a professional race. The only incident of multiple deaths from a team involved Néstor Mora, Augusto Triana, and Hernán Patiño from Team Postobón in 1995. The death rates for cyclists, in general, differ from country to country depending on how popular cycling is. A 2015 study of European Union cyclists' deaths, for instance, showed that in the Netherlands almost 25% of road deaths were cyclists while Greece had less than 5%. (Note: There is a 58-year gap in this List of the recorded deaths of cyclists during training – from 1936 to 1994 – because none have been found so far by the editors who have worked on this List.)

=== 1900 to 1999 ===
Cyclists who died during training
| Name | Image | Competitive status | Date of death | Nationality | Location of death and additional information |
|---|---|---|---|---|---|
| Archie McEachern | — | Track cyclist | May 13, 1902 | Canada | Coliseum Cycling Track, Atlantic City, New Jersey. McEachern was participating in a practice run prior to the Atlantic City velodrome's official opening. Riding close to the pace vehicle, McEachern was fatally injured when the bike's drive chain broke and died within minutes. |
| Breton | — | Track cyclist | August 1902 | Unknown | Parc des Princes track. Killed when he steered his bicycle away from another cyclist and into the path of a 14-horsepower motorcycle being driven at 50 mph by Marius Thé. The track management allowed motorcyclists and racing bicyclists (called "flyers") to train at the same time. |
| Edouard Taylor (Note: Taylor is also known as "Edouard-Henry Taylor".) | man on a bicycle | Track cyclist | 1903 | France (Note: Some sources seem to possibly state Taylor cycled for Great Britain, but newspaper reports from the era and others state he was French.) | Died at Aubervilliers, France in 1903. |
| Hugh McLean | Hugh McLeanTaylor | Track cyclist | September 5, 1909 | United States | Revere, Massachusetts cycling track. Died as a result of a training crash earlier in the month at the cycling track in Revere, Massachusetts. |
| Franz Suter | Franz Suter standing and wearing a striped sweater in 1912 | Road cyclist | June 1, 1914 | Switzerland | Struck by a train while training with his brother Paul near Courbevoie, France |
| Ottavio Bottecchia | black&white studio photo of a man looking directly into the camera | Road cyclist | June 14, 1927 | Italy | Found by the side of the road with bruises and serious skull fracture. The cause has remained a mystery – various theories have included a solo-crash/serious fall or an assault by unknown Fascists. |
| Gustave Lejour | — | Track cyclist | 1928 | Unknown | Died while training on the Frankfurt (Germany) track |
| Leo Verberkt | — | Track cyclist | December 7, 1936 | Netherlands | Died on the "Aalsterweg" near Eindhoven after being hit by a bus. |
| Seiki Hirama | | Track cyclist | August 21, 1968 | Japan | Fell off his bike and fractured his skull on August 16, during training camp at the Hiratsuka Velodrome, preparing for the 1968 UCI Track Cycling World Championships. Later died in hospital of cerebral contusion. Hirama wore a leather helmet. |
| Antonio Martín | — | Road cyclist | February 11, 1994 | Spain | Killed by a truck while training near Madrid |
| Néstor Mora | — | Road cyclist | February 21, 1995 | Colombia | Three members of Team Postobón were killed almost immediately while group training when a truck collided with another vehicle, sending the second vehicle careening into the group of cyclists. |
| Augusto Triana | — | Road cyclist | February 21, 1995 | Colombia | Three members of Team Postobón were killed almost immediately while group training when a truck collided with another vehicle, sending the second vehicle careening into the group of cyclists. |
| Hernán Patiño | — | Road cyclist | February 21, 1995 | Colombia | Three members of Team Postobón were killed almost immediately while group training when a truck collided with another vehicle, sending the second vehicle careening into the group of cyclists. |

=== 2000 to 2009 ===
Cyclists who died during training
| Name | Image | Competitive status | Date of death | Nationality | Location of death and additional information |
|---|---|---|---|---|---|
| Anders Nilsson | — | Road cyclist | June 21, 2000 | Sweden | Died immediately when hit by a speeding car during bicycle training, the driver left the scene. National team member in triathlon. |
| Ricardo Otxoa | — | Road cyclist | February 15, 2001 | Spain | Hit by a car during a training session together with his brother Javier (who survived but had serious brain injuries). The Circuito de Getxo was renamed the Memorial Ricardo Otxoa in his honor. |
| Luke Harrop | — | Road cyclist | January 13, 2002 | Australia | Struck by a stolen car driven by an unlicensed driver who was out on bail at the time and who also fled the scene. Gold Coast, Brisbane, Australia during a training ride. Having severe head trauma, former champion triathlete Harrop died a day after the crash. In 2003, Australia's Gold Coast Triathlon was renamed in Harrop's memory as the Gold Coast Triathlon – Luke Harrop Memorial. |
| David Martin | — | Road cyclist | November 4, 2002 | United States | Hit by a drunk driver during training |
| Haruko Fujinaka | — | Mountainbiker | May 17, 2003 | Japan | Crashed and died during a practice run for the opening round of the 2003 NORBA National Championship Series at Big Bear Lake, California |
| Lauri Aus | — | Road cyclist | July 20, 2003 | Estonia | Hit by a truck driven by a drunk driver while training in Estonia |
| Amy Gillett | — | Road cyclist | July 18, 2005 | Australia | Head-on collision with a car in Germany (while training with her squad for the Thüringen Rundfahrt der Frauen which had been scheduled for the next day) |
| Frederiek Nolf | Frederiek Nolf in a cycling uniform | Road cyclist | February 5, 2009 | Belgium | Died in his sleep of a heart attack during the 2009 Tour of Qatar |
| Zinaida Stahurskaya | — | Road cyclist | June 25, 2009 | Belarus | Struck and killed by a speeding car while training for the Belarus national championship on a public road. |

=== 2010 to 2019 ===
Cyclists who died during training
| Name | Image | Competitive status | Date of death | Nationality | Location of death and additional information |
|---|---|---|---|---|---|
| Jure Robič | male cyclist standing on a winner's podium | Road cyclist | September 24, 2010 | Slovenia | Died in a head-on collision with a car while descending on a narrow mountain forest road in Plavški Rovt near Jesenice, Slovenia. |
| Carla Swart | — | Road cyclist | January 19, 2011 | South Africa | Turned into the path of an oncoming truck in a bid to retrieve her cycling computer that she had just lost. Swart was a professional who had previously won nineteen individual and team cycling titles spanning four different variations of biking (cyclo-cross, mountain bike, road, and track) while on the Lees–McRae College cycling team. |
| Carly Hibberd | Carly Hibberd memorial/accident marker | Road cyclist | July 6, 2011 | Australia | Hit by a car while training in Italy |
| Victor Cabedo | Male cyclist during race on his bicycle in colorful orange racing outfit | Road cyclist | September 19, 2012 | Spain | Died during a training ride after colliding with a vehicle |
| Iñaki Lejarreta | cyclist on bike on a mountain trail | Mountain biker | December 12, 2012 | Spain | Killed in a training crash when his cycle was struck by a car |
| Burry Stander | male cyclist crossing the finish line, arms held aloft – Burry Stander winning the under 23 men's XC title at the 2009 UCI Mountain Bike World Championships | Mountain biker | January 1, 2013 | South Africa | Died during a training ride after colliding with a vehicle |
| Amy Dombroski | Amy Dombroski on a bicycle during a race | Cyclo-cross rider | October 3, 2013 | United States | Hit by a truck while training in Belgium |
| Kristof Goddaert | closeup of a cyclist in bicycle wearing helmet & cycling gear | Road cyclist | October 18, 2014 | Belgium | Killed during a training ride in Antwerp when he fell from his bike and was struck by a bus |
| Claudio Clarindo | — | Road cyclist | January 25, 2016 | Brazil | Struck by an automobile whose driver had fallen asleep, Clarindo died almost immediately after being hit. |
| Kelly McGarry | — | Freerider | February 1, 2016 | New Zealand | Died from cardiac arrest while biking on the Fernhill Loop Track in Central Otago. |
| Ellen Watters | — | Road cyclist | December 23, 2016 | Canada | Died following a collision involving her bicycle and an automobile during a training ride in Sussex, New Brunswick |
| Michele Scarponi | male bicyclist in colorful racing outfit | Road cyclist | April 22, 2017 | Italy | Died after being hit by a truck, while on a training ride in Filottrano. |
| Jason Lowndes | male cyclist in racing outfit | Road cyclist | December 22, 2017 | Australia | Struck by a car while training near Bendigo, Australia |
| Alistair Eeckman | — | Triathlete/duathlete | August 20, 2018 | United States | Died after colliding with a line bus on a post-race recovery ride in Weyer, Austria at 2:10 pm local time, the day after racing Powerman Austria, placing 6th. Winner of the 2017 Powerman Duathlon in Panama. |

=== 2020 to present ===
Cyclists who died during training
| Name | Image | Competitive status | Date of death | Nationality | Location of death and additional information |
|---|---|---|---|---|---|
| Ben Sonntag | — | Mountain biker | March 4, 2020 | United States | Struck by a pickup truck while training near Durango, Colorado. Sonntag was a world-class athlete in multiple sports, including being a professional mountain cyclist. He had previously won elite world championships in winter triathlon, was an All-American in cross-country skiing for the University of Alaska Anchorage, and had won three individual national collegiate cycling titles while at Fort Lewis College in Durango – two collegiate cross-country bike national titles and a championship in short-track. |
| Jan Riedmann | — | Road cyclist | August 2, 2020 | Germany | A member of Team Auto Eder Bayern, the Under-19 team of Bora–Hansgrohe. Struck by a car while training with teammates near Sugenheim in Bavaria. |
| Daniel Pedraza Castillo | — | Road cyclist | January 25, 2021 | Colombia | Hit by a public transportation bus that had reversed to pick up a passenger on the side of the road while Pedraza Castillo was doing time trial work. |
| Ryunosuke Narikiyo | — | Track cyclist (keirin) | February 24, 2021 | Japan | Collision with a truck on public road whilst on a training ride with his teammates. |
| Gwen Inglis | — | Road cyclist | May 16, 2021 | USA | Inglis was the 2019 US Masters road race champion in the 45-49 age group and a member of the Back Swift-Cycleton Cycling Team. She was hit by a car driven by an apparently impaired driver that veered into the bike lane while Inglis was on a training ride. |
| Adrián Babič | — | Road cyclist | May 26, 2021 | Slovakia | Babič was the champion and the vice-champion of Slovakia in the individual time trial in the under-23 category, Slovakia's junior champion in winter triathlon, and the winner of the Slovak World Cycling Cup of 2019. Competed at the 2018 World Championships. Babič was struck by a vehicle while training |
| Desiet Kidane | — | Road cyclist | November 8, 2021 | Eritrea | Kidane was struck and killed while training in Asmara. At the time of her death, the 21- year old cyclist was considered a promising talent in the World Cycling Centre programme |
| Davide Rebellin | — | Road cyclist | August 11, 2022 | Italy | Hit by a truck and killed while out on a training ride at 51, one month after his retirement race |
| Estela Domínguez | — | Road cyclist and cyclocross rider | February 9, 2023 | Spain | Killed in a collision with a lorry at Villares de la Reina at the age of 19, Domínguez, from Valladolid and the daughter of a Giro d'Italia stage winner had been training for her first year as a professional with the Sopela team. |
| Germán Chaves | — | Road cyclist | June 3, 2023 | Colombia | Killed in a collision with a truck while training in Chocontà his hometown at the age of 28. He was training with his father when they were both struck, killing Germán instantly and his father later in hospital. Chaves was an active cyclist since 2014 and was currently with Team Sistecrédito. |
| Tijl De Decker | De Decker | Road cyclist | August 25, 2023 | Belgium | Collided with the rear of a car while training in Lier, close to his hometown Antwerp. He died at Antwerp University Hospital at the age of 22 as a result of his injuries. De Decker was an active rider for Lotto–Dstny Development Team and was set to join UCI ProTeam Lotto–Dstny for the 2024 UCI World Tour season. |
| Sara Piffer | | Road cyclist | January 24, 2025 | Italy | Killed by a car that was overtaking another vehicle. Her brother was also injured. |
| Rowan Collin Wilson | | Road cyclist | April 3, 2026 | Trinidad and Tobago | While avoiding another racer, he landed on track fencing and succumbed to his injuries. |
| Milan Bral | | Road cyclist | April 26, 2026 | Belgium | Killed by a driver of a vehicle while on a training ride in Ronse. |
| Toshiaki Fushimi | | Track cyclist | July 19, 2026 | Japan | Died in an accident during a keirin race in Japan. |

== See also ==
- Bicycle racing
- Madonna del Ghisallo
- Ghost bike
- Ride of Silence
- List of doping cases in cycling
- Cycling track tragedy at Berlin - a tragic incident in which a motorized derny crashed into crowds.
