= Salvador Blasco =

Spanish footballer

Personal information
- Full name: Salvador Blasco Ribes
- Date of birth: 28 February 1916
- Place of birth: Torrent, Valencia, Spain
- Date of death: unknown
- Position: Midfielder

Youth career
- Valencia

Senior career*
| Years | Team | Apps | (Gls) |
| 1934–1936 | Valencia | 6 | (0) |
| 1939–1941 | Valencia | 11 | (0) |
| 1941–1943 | Elche | | |
| 1943–1944 | Alcoyano | | |
| 1945–1946 | Levante | | |
| Total | | 17 | (0) |
- * Club domestic league appearances and goals

Salvador Blasco Ribes (28 February 1916 – unknown), also known as Torrentí, was a Spanish footballer who played as a midfielder for Valencia and Elche in the early 1940s.

== Early life ==
Salvador Blasco was born on 28 February 1916 in Torrent, Valencia, as the second of four siblings from the marriage formed by Salvador Blasco and Isabel Ribes.

== Career ==
Blasco began his career in the youth ranks of his hometown club Valencia, where he quickly stood out for his courage and enthusiasm on the pitch, as well as his tireless work in the midfield, excelling particularly in intercepting the opponent's balls and in winning balls back. On 23 September 1934, the 18-year-old Blasco made his debut with the first team in a match against Azcárraga. Over a year later he made his La Liga debut on 8 March 1936, when the coach Andrés Balsa fielded him in a fixture against Osasuna, remaining in the starting line-up until the outbreak of the Spanish Civil War.

Once the conflict ended in 1939, Blasco returned to Valencia, scoring his first (and only) goal for the club on 1 October 1939, in a Valencia Championship match against Castellón. In his last season at the club, Valencia won the 1941 Copa del Generalísimo, but he is not officially considered a member of the winning squad because he did not appear in a single match in the competition. In total, he played 17 La Liga matches for Valencia.

After leaving Valencia in 1941, Blasco received offers from Hércules and Espanyol, but he ultimately chose to sign for Elche, with whom he played for two years, until 1943. During his time there, he faced Valencia on both legs of the first round of the 1942 Copa del Generalísimo, which ended in a 2–6 aggregate loss. In 1943, he went to Alcoyano, where he stayed for one season, in which he started in 24 Segunda División matches. He played his last football at Levante, where he retired in 1945, aged 29. In April 1945, he coached a team made up of staff from the Levante newspaper group, currently known as Levante-EMV, in a match against a selection of workers from a well-known Madrid newspaper, which ended in a draw.

Given his young age, he was rumored to be a reinforcement for Valencia during the pre-season of the 1946–47 season, something which never came to fruition.

== Later life ==
Together with his wife, Júlia, and their two children, Blasco moved first to Vedat de Torrent and then to Calle Pizarro Street in Valencia, where, according to his relatives, he eventually went missing.

== Honours ==
Valencia

- Valencia Championship:
  - Champions (2): 1936–37 and 1939–40
