= Dolmayrac =

- Commune
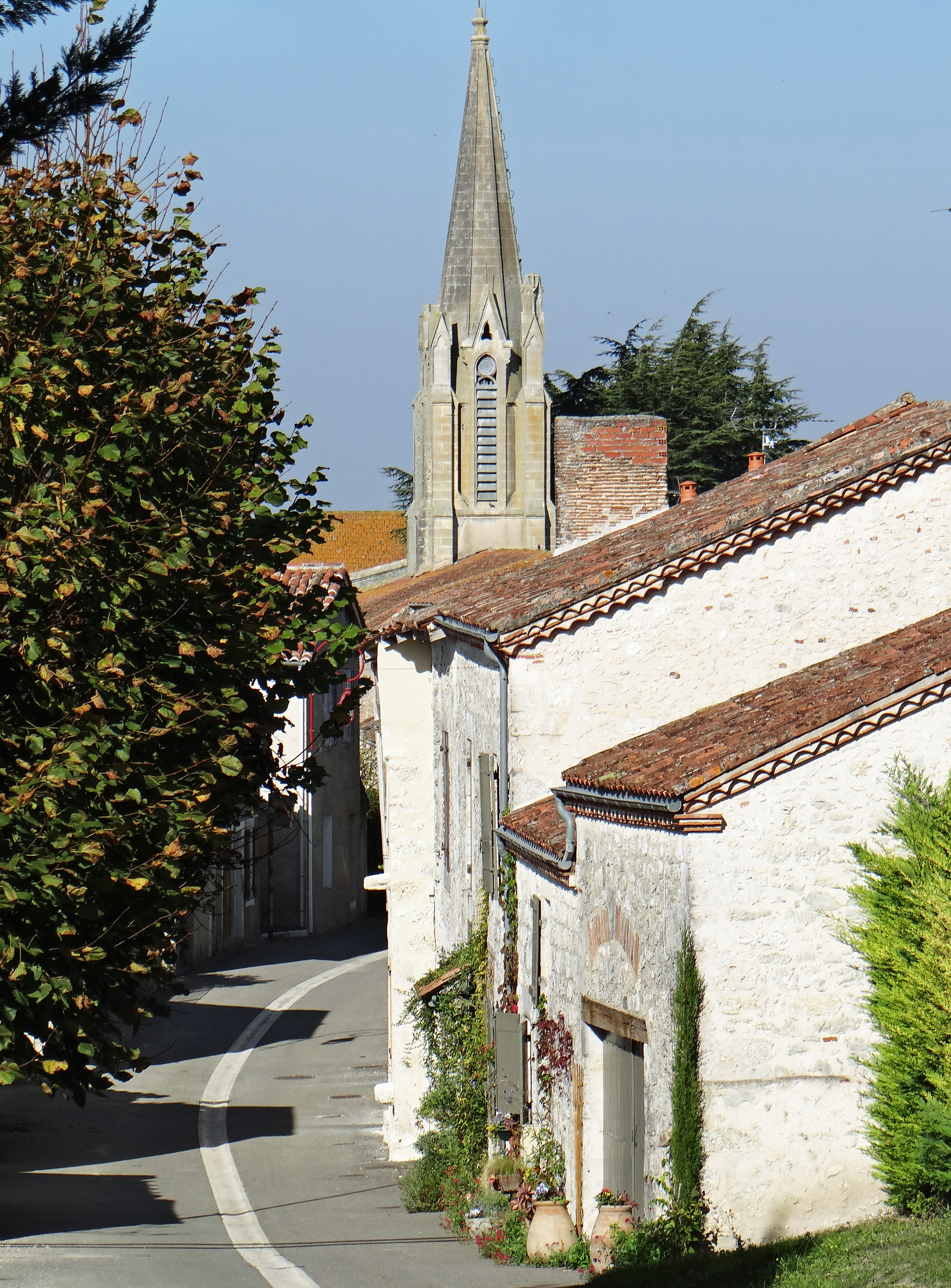
- The church and surrounding buildings in Dolmayrac

- Coat of arms
- Location of Dolmayrac
- Location within France Location within Nouvelle-Aquitaine
- Coordinates: 44°21′47″N 0°35′25″E
- Country: France
- Region: Nouvelle-Aquitaine
- Department: Lot-et-Garonne
- Arrondissement: Villeneuve-sur-Lot
- Canton: Le Livradais
- Intercommunality: CA Grand Villeneuvois

Government
  - Mayor (2020–2026): Gilles Grosjean
- Area^{1}: 19.4 km^{2} (7.5 sq mi)
- Elevation: 194 m (636 ft)
- Highest elevation: 219 m (719 ft)
- Lowest elevation: 50 m (160 ft)
- Population (2023): 719
  - Density: 37.1/km^{2} (96.0/sq mi)
- Time zone: UTC+01:00 (CET)
  - Summer (DST): UTC+02:00 (CEST)
- INSEE/Postal code: 47081 /47110
- Website: dolmayrac.wifeo.com
- ^{1} French Land Register data, which excludes lakes, ponds, glaciers > 1 km^{2} (0.386 sq mi or 247 acres) and river estuaries.

Dolmayrac (French pronunciation: [dɔlmɛjʁak]; Occitan: Domairac) is a commune in the Lot-et-Garonne department in south-western France.

== See also ==
- Communes of the Lot-et-Garonne department
