= Baldachin of Ribes =

12th century altar-canopy

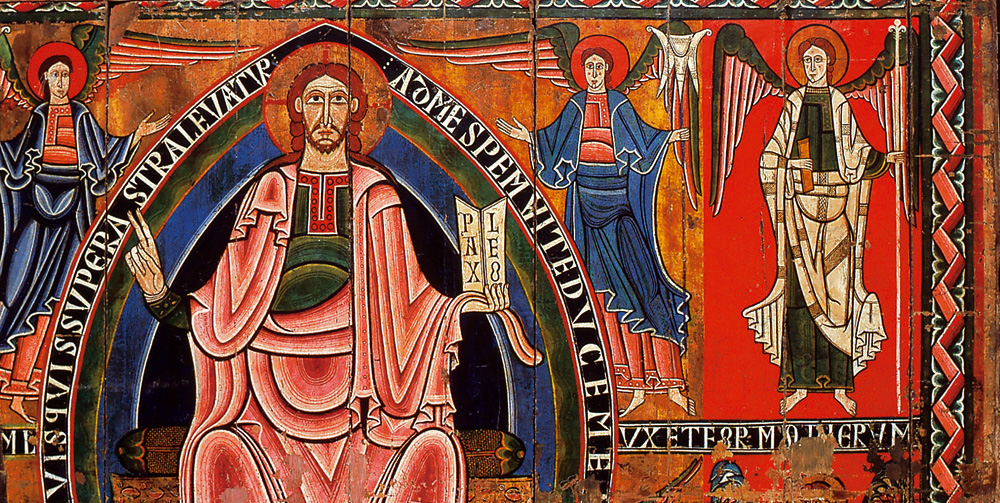
The painted wooden baldachin measures 3.5 × 80.5 × 157 cm

The baldachin of Ribes (Catalan: baldaquí de Ribes) is a fragmentary altar-canopy in the Romanesque style now in the Episcopal Museum of Vic. It is the masterpiece of the so-called "Ripoll workshop" (taller de Ripoll). It dates to the second quarter of the twelfth century. The surviving fragment is only one fourth of the size of the original, which contained a central mandorla with the figure of Christ and four angels on each side.

The style of the baldachin shows strong south French influence, and borrows many features from the tympanum of Moissac Abbey, especially in the robes of Christ. The robes of the angels, however, and the hairstyles of all the figures are more typically Iberian.
