= Rui Lavarinhas =

Portuguese cyclist

Personal information
- Full name: Rui Agostinho do Couto Lavarinhas
- Born: 9 January 1971 (age 55) Viana do Castelo, Portugal

Cycling career
- Sport: Cycling
- Current team: Retired
- Discipline: Road
- Role: Rider

Professional teams
- 1997–1998: Troiamarisco
- 1999–2004: Maia–CIN
- 2005–2006: Carvalhelhos–Boavista
- 2007: Benfica

Rui Agostinho do Couto Lavarinhas (born 9 January 1971) is a Portuguese former professional cyclist.

== Major results ==
1998
1st GP Gondomar
1999
1st Overall Vuelta a Venezuela

1st Stages 3 & 9

1st GP Gondomar
2002
1st Road race, National Road Championships
1st Overall GP Mosqueteiros – Rota do Marques

1st Stage 3

2003
3rd Overall Volta a Portugal
2005
1st Stage 4 Volta a Portugal
