= Pastor Linares =

Venezuelan road racing cyclist (born 1971)

Pastor Linares (born 12 May 1971) is a retired male professional road racing cyclist from Venezuela.

== Career ==
1996
1st in General Classification Vuelta a Venezuela (VEN)
1997
1st in Stage 8 Vuelta al Táchira (VEN)
