= Guillem de Ribes =

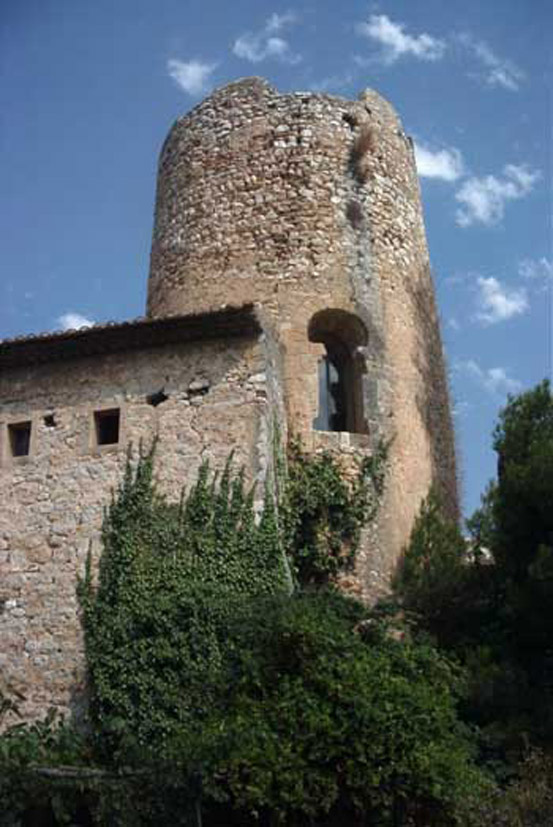
Ruins of the castle of Ribes held by Guillem

Guillem de Ribes (c. 1140 – c. 1220) was a Catalan nobleman and troubadour, that is, a composer of music and lyric verse in the Old Occitan language. None of his works survive and he is known as a troubadour only from a single reference to him in a song by another troubadour

Guillem was the son of Arnau de Ribes and younger brother of Ponç I de Ribes. The family were vassals of the Bishop of Barcelona. His father, a warrior, left the administration of the family castle, Sant Pere de Ribes, in the hands of his younger brother, Ramon I, for long periods and it was Ramon who inherited it after Arnau's death in 1168. Ponç, a warrior like his father, took over the lordship of the castle only after Ramon's death in 1180. He was absent for long periods and the actual administration was mainly in the hands of Guillem.

In 1190, Ponç pawned Ribes to his brother in order to finance and personally oversee the defence of the castle of Miralpeix (now part of Sitges), held by one of his vassals, when it came under siege by two rivals, Berenguer de Castellet and Eymerich de Espiells. The castle was taken in an assault and partially destroyed. In a lawsuit brought against Guillem in the early 1200s, it was alleged that he had deliberately impeded the defence of the castle to his own benefit. He was succeeded by his nephew, Ponç II.

The troubadour Peire d'Alvernhe composed a song satirizing twelve contemporary troubadours. It was probably first performed for the entourage of Eleanor, daughter of Henry II of England and fiancée of Alfonso VIII of Castile, while it was passing through Gascony on its way to Castile in 1173. It is likely that the twelve targets of Peire's satire were present in the entourage at the time. Guillem is the fifth target:

E•N Guillems de Ribas lo quins, qu'es malvatz defors e dedins, e ditz totz sos vers raucamen, per que es avols sos retins, e'atretan se'n fari'us chins; e l'uoil semblan de vout d'argen.	Lord Guillem de Ribes is the fifth, who is wicked outside and in and recites all his poems harshly, for his noises are terrible, like those made by a dog; and his eyes look like those of a silver statue.

Guillem's active career as a troubadour can be placed in the early 1170s, when he was about thirty years old and before he had inherited the family castle.
