= David López Ribes =

Spanish painter

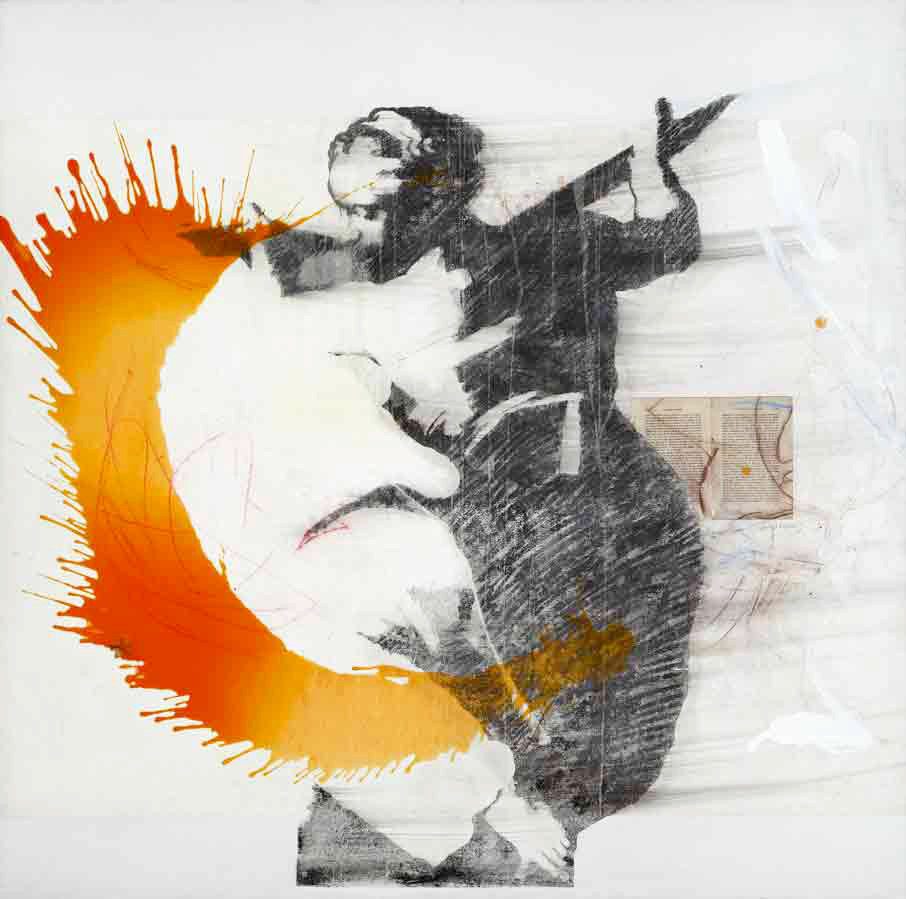
Art is revelation, 2007

David López Ribes (born June 27, 1972 in Valencia, Spain) is a Spanish painter and multidisciplinary artist.

His studies took place at the Polytechnic University of Valencia, UPV between 1991 and 1995, and at the School of Visual Arts in New York City during 2003.

David López Ribes is the winner of the Pontifical Academies Prize 2012 by Pope Benedict XVI, for his contribution to Christian Humanism on the contemporary.

== Overview ==
David López's work is mainly pictorial, partly heir of informalism. However, as of the year 2000 he develops New Media (video, sculpture and installation). They are spiritual and transcendental works, which are clearly influenced by his personal life. Through painting, sculpture and video art projected onto real objects, he addresses issues such as: father, sacrifice, gift, transit and kingdom, in the content of his work and also has a constant preoccupation for using media as a means to dialogue with the secular man. Creating connections between Contemporary Culture and Faith.

David López Ribes video installations are designed to cause reflection on perception while at the same time reconsidering video as a medium in itself. They are images that want to be here with us out of the boundaries of the 'frame' and into real life images projected on real objects on the same action performed. They are multimedia installations that blur the boundary between the tangible and the transcendental. The nostalgia of harmony, the rejection of subjectivism, and liturgies of everyday life as an expression of moral integrity, are his cross-cutting themes. His work is present in public and private collections nationally and internationally.

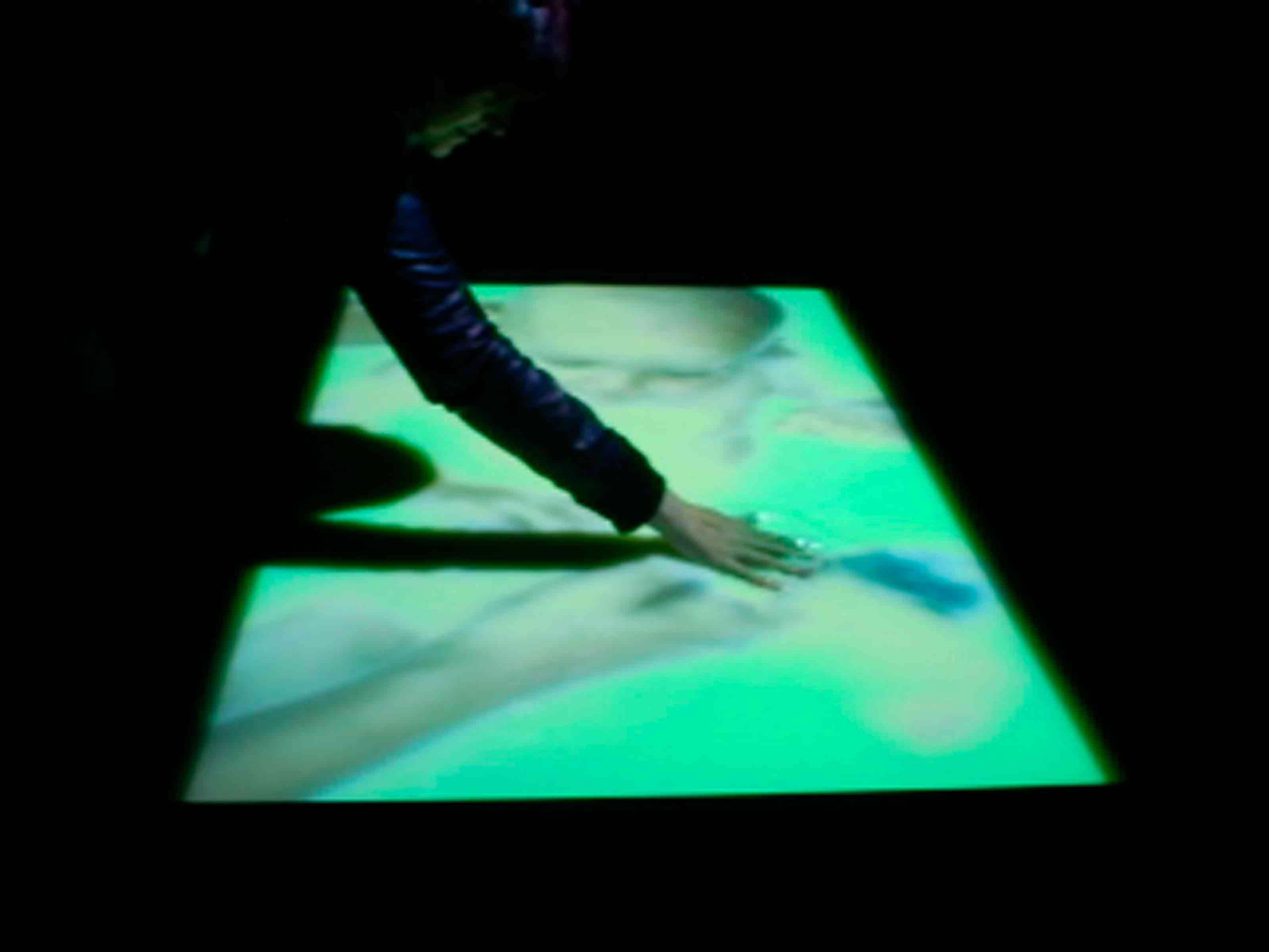
Bath 2012, Caceres

David López is awarded with the Young Art Prize 96 from IVAJ (Valencian Youth Institute) in 1997, and has held art exhibits in the Palau de la Musica (The Music Palace) in Valencia, in the House of Culture of Castellón and Alicante´s 14 Center, among others. That summer he worked with painter Antonio López. In August 1997 he moved to Paris, where he lived until 2000, a period in which he helped manage Cultural Affairs of the Instituto Cervantes in Paris and made his first solo exhibits in France. He also began his relationship with the Japanese Nichido Gallery, where he continuously exhibits artwork, both individual and collective.

In 2001, he had an art exhibit at Charpa Gallery, Valencia. In 2002, he received the Visual Arts Fellowship from the Generalitat Valenciana and thus traveled to New York in 2003, for a New Media Master´s at the School of Visual Arts in New York City. In 2004, he had an art exhibit at Edgar Neville Gallery in Valencia, commissioned by the painter José Sanleón, and director of the Valencian Institute of Modern Art IVAM Consuelo Ciscar.

In 2008, he was the winner of the X National Painting Prize Milagros Mir. In 2011, he had another art exhibit in Valencia at the Palau de la Música. In the same year he participates in the exhibit Art + Fe' at the Pons Foundation in Madrid, within the official program of the World Youth Day 2011. This exhibit has been presented at the Cultural Institute The Brocense, in Caceres, Lisbon and is now coming to Castellon and Valencia. López gives the inaugural speech. His artwork is present in public and private collections at a national and international level.

From 1999, David López, along with the Spanish painter Kiko Argüello and an international team of painters, develop a New Aesthetic for the Catholic Church in seminaries, churches and liturgical spaces worldwide.

== MURAL PAINTINGS ==
- 2023 Boston MA EEUU
- 2022 Manacor Mallorca Island spain.
- 2021 Queens Nueva York EE. UU.
- Boston EE. UU.
- 2020 Koln GERMANY
- Plainfield new jersey EE. UU
- 2020 RIVNE UKRAINE
- 2019 Seoul Korea
- Eger, Hungary
- Valencia, Spain
- Plainfield NJ. EE. UU
- 2018 Los Angeles California EE. UU
- Guardian Angel Sculpture for Los Angeles Cathedral Los Angeles California EE. UU
- Brasilia Brazil
- 2017 Plainfierld New Jersey EE. UU
- Mazarron Murcia. Spain
- Gandia. Valencia spain
- Torrente spain
- 2016 Brussels Belgium
- Ivrea Italy
- 2015 Ibiza Cathedral spain
- San Pedro de Sula Honduras
- Macerata Italy
- 2014 Verona Italy.
- Porto San Giorgio Fermo Italy
- Zaragoza
- Malta
- Valencia
- 2013 Almere Amsterdam Holland
- 2012 Brasilia, Brazil
- Ibiza
- Poetto Sardinia, Italy
- 2011 Valdemoro Madrid
- Torrente, Valencia
- 2010 Newark RM New Jersey, EE. UU
- Shanghai, China
- Managua, Nicaragua
- Valencia Spain
- 2009 Denver EE. UU
- Rome, Italy
- Warsaw, Poland
- Valencia Spain
- 2008 Macerata Italy
- Denver EE. UU
- 2007 Strasbourg France
- Los Angeles EE. UU
- Rome, Italy
- 2006 Ferro di Cavallo Perugia Italy
- Washington EE. UU
- Newark, EE. UU
- Rome Italy
- 2005 Strasbourg France
- Berlin Germany
- San Pedro del Pinatar, Murcia, Spain
- 2004 Almudena Cathedral, Madrid, Spain
- 2003 Domus Galilea Galilea, Israel
- Madrid Spain
- Valencia Madrid, Spain
- 2001 Madrid Spain
- 2000 Oulu Finland
- 1999 Piacenza Italy

== Selected exhibitions ==
- INDIVIDUAL EXHIBITIONS
- 2020 Seton Hall University NJ EE. UU
- 2011 Palau de la Musica Valencia.
- 2010 Marion Meyer Gallery California EE. UU
- 2008 Marion Meyer Gallery, California EE. UU
- 2007 Galerie Nichido Paris france
- 2005 Gabernia Valencia Gallery spain Palau de Vivanco catarroja spain
- 2004 Edgar Neville Gallery-curator director of the Museum of Contemporary Art of Valencia
- 2003 SVA New York EE. UU
- 2002 Galeria Charpa Valencia spain
- 2001 Galerie Nichido Paris france
- 2000 EspacioArte Renfe Valencia spain
- 1999 Galerie Bernanos Paris france
- 1998 College of Spain Paris france
- 1997 City Museum Alicante Young Art Award spain
- Castellón City Museum Young Art Award spain
- Palau de la Música Valencia. Young Art Award spain
- 1995 Palau de Vivanco Valencia spain
- GROUP EXHIBITIONS
- 2020 Galerie Nichido Paris france
- 2019 Cardenal Herrera University - Contemporary Art and Faith. Madrid spain 2016 Galerie Nichido Paris france
- 2014 Galerie Nichido Paris france
- 2012 Art + Faith Lisbon france Art + Faith Museum of the City Cáceres spain Galeria Nichido Paris france
- 2011 Arte + Fe Madrid Official activity of the World Youth Day france Fundación Pons Madrid spain Marion Meyer Gallery Laguna Beach California EE. UU Galerie Nichido Paris france
- 2010 Galerie NIchido Paris Marion Meyer California EE. UU
- 2009 A Mir Valencia Museum Curator; F. Calvo Serraller, former Director of the Prado Museum.
- 2008 Galerie Nichido Paris france
- 2007 Lowe Gallery Los Angeles California EE. UU
- Marion Meyer Gallery Laguna Beach California EE. UU
- Galerie Nichido Paris france
- 2006 Galerie Nichido Paris france 2005 Museum of Modern Art IVAM Valencia swain
- 2003 SVA New York EE. UU Galeria Nichido Paris france
- 2002 Museum of the City Madrid spain Museum of the City Valencia spain
- 2001 Museum of the City Madrid spain
- 1999 Cultural Center of the Villa Madrid- presided over by Reina Sofia of Spain
- 1998 Colegio de España Cite International universitario Paris france
- 1997 Palau de la Musica Valencia spain Alicante City Museum
- Castellón City Museum
- National Drawing Museum Gregorio Prieto Valdepeñas Award spain
