= Chaguaramas, Venezuela =

Town in Guárico, Venezuela

Chaguaramas
- Town
- Location within Venezuela
- Coordinates: 09°20′0″N 66°16′0″W
- Country: Venezuela
- State: Guárico
- Shire town: Chaguaramas Municipality

Chaguaramas is a town in northern Venezuela, in the state of Guárico. It is the shire town of the Chaguaramas Municipality.

== Transport ==
In 2006, it was proposed to build a new railway line to this station.
