= Sant Pere de Ribes =

- Municipality
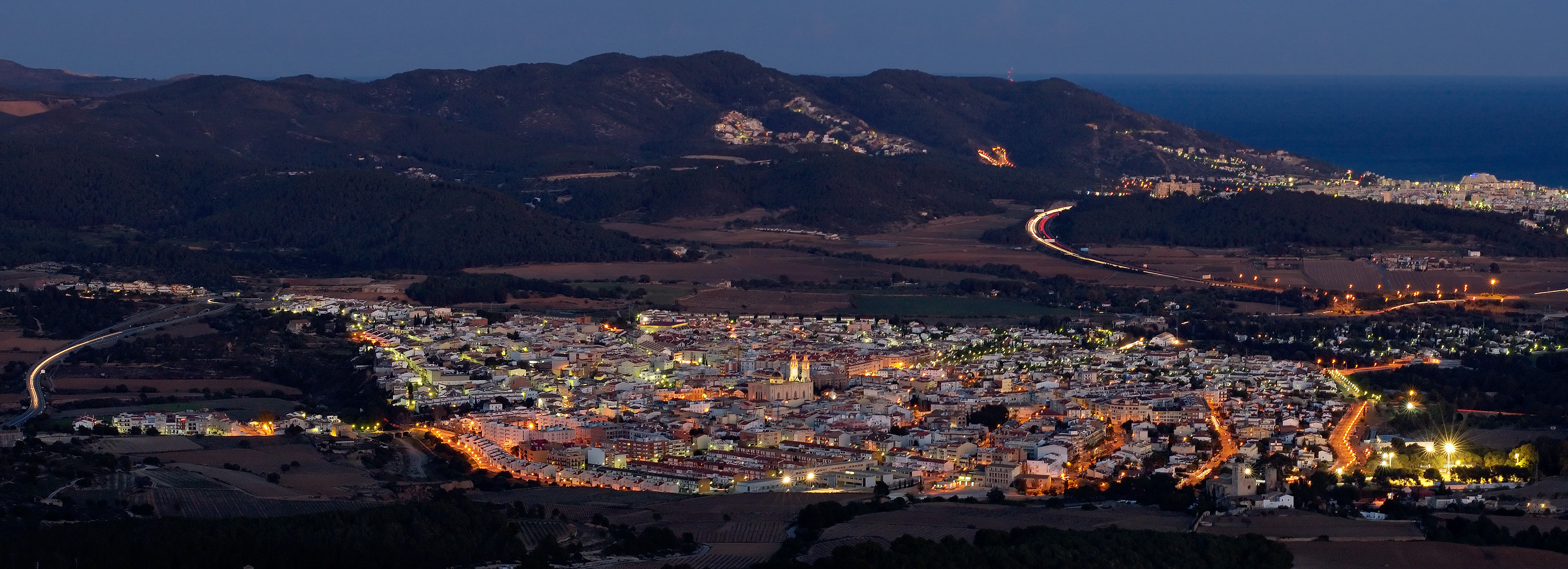
- A panorama of the town

- Coat of arms

- Location in the Province of Barcelona Location in Catalonia Location in Spain
- Coordinates: 41°15′35″N 1°46′25″E
- Country: Spain
- Community: Catalonia
- Province: Barcelona
- Comarca: Garraf

Government
  - Mayor: Abigail Garrido Tinta (2019) (PSC)

Area
  - Total: 40.8 km^{2} (15.8 sq mi)
- Elevation: 44 m (144 ft)

Population (2025-01-01)
  - Total: 32,705
  - Density: 802/km^{2} (2,080/sq mi)
- Postal code: 08810
- Website: santperederibes.cat

Sant Pere de Ribes (Note: Catalan pronunciation: [ˌsam ˈpeɾə ðə ˈriβəs]) is a town in the center of the Garraf comarca, in Barcelona province, Catalonia, Spain. The remains of a 12th-century castle once ruled by the troubadour Guillem de Ribes are in the town.

== Education ==
Lycée Français Bel-Air Garraf, a French international school, is in Sant Pere de Ribes. The city is also home to Richmond International School, a Finnish-style school for students between the ages of 3 and 18.

The Olive Tree School: An International British School for 3-16 year-olds. They follow the British Curriculum and are members of The National Association of British Schools in Spain (NABSS). Their focus is on personalized learning, creativity, and outdoor experiences.

In September 2024, Learnlife's Village Hub opened. The international school provides personal learning programmes for children aged 6+. It is Learnlife's third Learn Hub in Barcelona.

== Culture ==
Main festivals include:

- Festa Major de Sant Pere (29 June)
- Festa Major de Sant Pau (25 January)
- Festa Major de Santa Eulàlia (12 February)
- Festa Major de Sant Joan (24 June)

Aitana Bonmatí, regarded as one of the best players of women's football history, was born and raised in this city.

== Sources ==
- Panareda Clopés, Josep Maria; Rios Calvet, Jaume; Rabella Vives, Josep Maria (1989). Guia de Catalunya, Barcelona: Caixa de Catalunya. ISBN 84-87135-01-3 (Spanish). ISBN 84-87135-02-1 (Catalan).
