= 2012 UCI Road World Championships – Women's road race =

Women's road race
2012 UCI Road World Championships
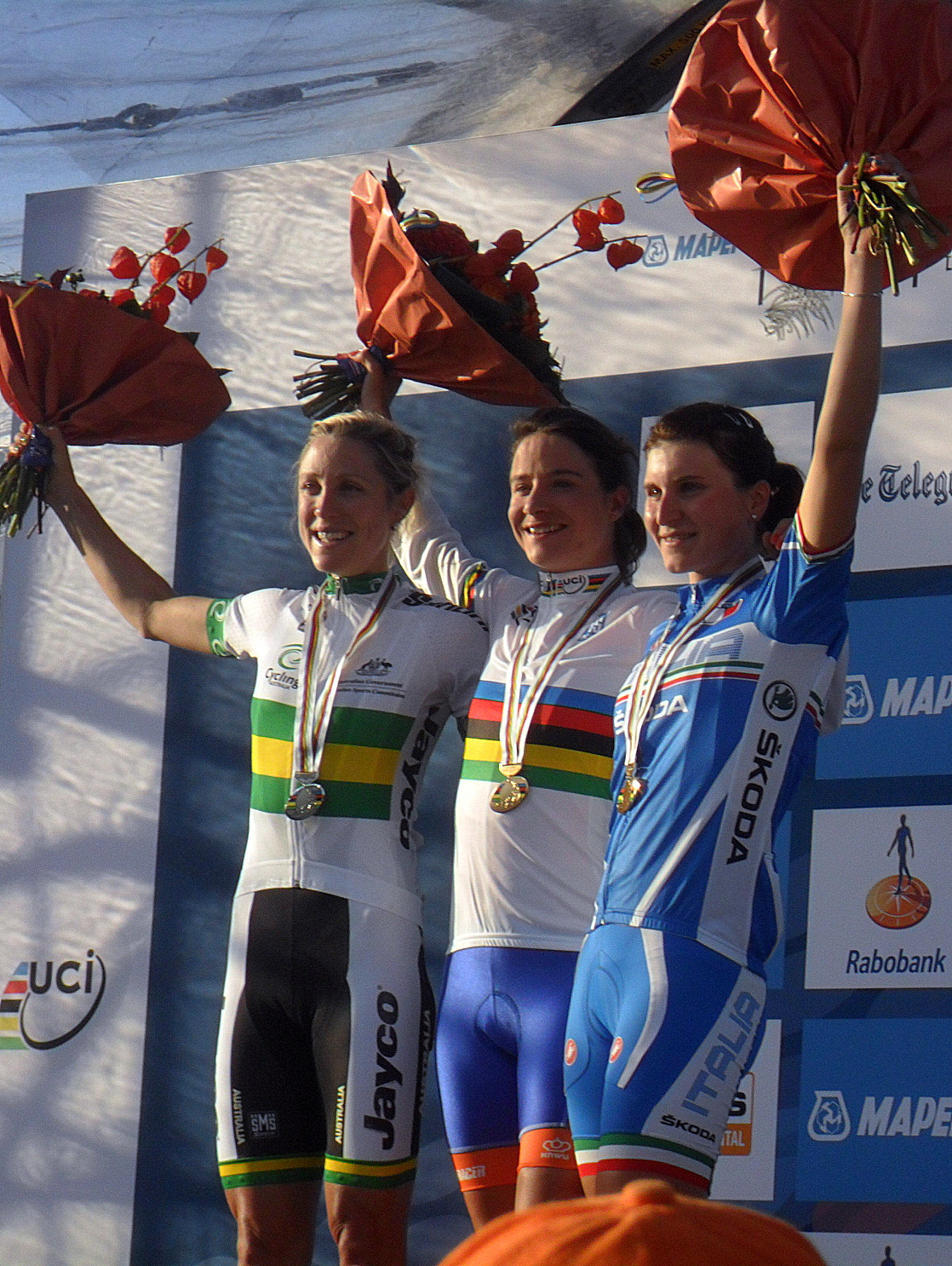
- Podium: Neylan, Vos and Longo Borghini

Race details
- Dates: 22 September 2012
- Stages: 1 in (Netherlands) Valkenburg (NED)
- Distance: 129 km (80 mi)
- Winning time: 3h 14' 29"

Medalists
	Gold	(Netherlands) Marianne Vos (NED)
	Silver	(Australia) Rachel Neylan (AUS)
	Bronze	(Italy) Elisa Longo Borghini (ITA)

The Women's road race of the 2012 UCI Road World Championships cycling event took place on 22 September in the province of Limburg, Netherlands.

Dutchwoman Marianne Vos won her second world title after finishing second 5 times since 2007. She struggled to escape for much of the 129-kilometre eight-lap race, but finally got clear on the intimidating Cauberg Hill to sprint to victory on the last two ascents. With a finishing time of three hours 14 minutes and 29 seconds, Vos defeated Rachel Neylan of Australia by 10 seconds, with Italy's Elisa Longo Borghini finishing third.

== Route ==
The race covered 129 km and contained eight laps on a 16.5 km circuit. The circuit included the Bemelerberg, 900 m long and maximal 7% and the Cauberg hill in Valkenburg – where the Amstel Gold Race has finished since 2003, and hosted the finish of stage 3 of the 2006 Tour de France – a 1.5 kilometres (0.93 mi) long climb with a maximum gradient of 12%. The finish was 1.7 kilometres (1.1 mi) beyond the summit of the Cauberg hill.

== Final classification ==
Of the race's 132 entrants, 80 riders completed the full distance of 129 kilometres (80 mi).

Rank	Rider	Country	Time
1	Marianne Vos	Netherlands	3h 14' 29"
1	Rachel Neylan	Australia	+ 10"
1	Elisa Longo Borghini	Italy	+ 18"
4	Amber Neben	United States	+ 33"
5	Anna van der Breggen	Netherlands	+ 55"
6	Rossella Ratto	Italy	+ 3' 40"
7	Linda Villumsen	New Zealand	+ 4' 37"
8	Judith Arndt	Germany	+ 4' 37"
9	Emma Johansson	Sweden	+ 4' 37"
10	Paulina Brzeźna	Poland	+ 4' 37"
11	Annemiek van Vleuten	Netherlands	+ 4' 37"
12	Ashleigh Moolman	South Africa	+ 4' 37"
13	Joëlle Numainville	Canada	+ 4' 37"
14	Alena Amialiusik	Belarus	+ 4' 37"
15	Emma Pooley	United Kingdom	+ 4' 37"
16	Evelyn Stevens	United States	+ 4' 37"
17	Jessie Daams	Belgium	+ 4' 37"
18	Liesbet De Vocht	Belgium	+ 4' 37"
19	Hanka Kupfernagel	Germany	+ 4' 49"
20	Giorgia Bronzini	Italy	+ 4' 49"
21	Leah Kirchmann	Canada	+ 4' 49"
22	Inga Čilvinaitė	Lithuania	+ 4' 49"
23	Cecilie Gotaas Johnsen	Norway	+ 4' 49"
24	Oxana Kozonchuk	Russia	+ 4' 49"
25	Yevheniya Vysotska	Ukraine	+ 4' 49"
26	Ivanna Borovychenko	Ukraine	+ 4' 49"
27	Larisa Pankova	Russia	+ 4' 49"
28	Anna Sanchis Chafer	Spain	+ 4' 49"
29	Carmen Small	United States	+ 4' 49"
30	Karol-Ann Canuel	Canada	+ 4' 49"
31	Tiffany Cromwell	Australia	+ 4' 52"
32	Tatiana Antoshina	Russia	+ 4' 54"
33	Megan Guarnier	United States	+ 4' 54"
34	Charlotte Becker	Germany	+ 4' 54"
35	Eneritz Iturriagaechevarria Mazaga	Spain	+ 4' 58"
36	Clemilda Fernandes Silva	Brazil	+ 4' 58"
37	Edwige Pitel	France	+ 4' 58"
38	Elena Cecchini	Italy	+ 4' 58"
39	Sharon Laws	United Kingdom	+ 4' 58"
40	Sofie De Vuyst	Belgium	+ 4' 58"
41	Kelly Druyts	Belgium	+ 4' 58"
42	Martina Růžičková	Czech Republic	+ 4' 58"
43	Annelies Van Doorslaer	Belgium	+ 4' 58"
44	Kristin McGrath	United States	+ 4' 58"
45	Claudia Häusler	Germany	+ 4' 58"
46	Aleksandra Burchenkova	Russia	+ 4' 58"
47	Pauline Ferrand-Prévot	France	+ 5' 03"
48	Lucinda Brand	Netherlands	+ 5' 03"
49	Olena Sharha	Ukraine	+ 5' 03"
50	Cherise Taylor	South Africa	+ 5' 03"
51	Lise Nøstvold	Norway	+ 5' 03"
52	Małgorzata Jasińska	Poland	+ 5' 03"
53	Shara Gillow	Australia	+ 5' 03"
54	Ane Santesteban Gonzalez	Spain	+ 5' 03"
55	Amélie Rivat	France	+ 5' 03"
56	Kataržina Sosna	Lithuania	+ 5' 03"
57	Trixi Worrack	Germany	+ 5' 03"
58	Andrea Dvorak	United States	+ 5' 03"
59	Olivia Dillon	Ireland	+ 5' 39"
60	Nicole Cooke	United Kingdom	+ 5' 39"
61	Petra Zrimšek	Slovenia	+ 5' 39"
62	Jennifer Hohl	Switzerland	+ 5' 39"
63	Edita Janeliūnaitė	Lithuania	+ 5' 39"
64	Francesca Cauz	Italy	+ 5' 39"
65	Verónica Leal Balderas	Mexico	+ 5' 39"
66	Nikki Harris	United Kingdom	+ 5' 39"
67	Veronique Labonte	Canada	+ 5' 39"
68	Amanda Spratt	Australia	+ 5' 39"
69	Adrie Visser	Netherlands	+ 5' 41"
70	Ina-Yoko Teutenberg	Germany	+ 5' 41"
71	Jessie MacLean	Australia	+ 6' 04"
72	Gracie Elvin	Australia	+ 6' 04"
73	Marta Tagliaferro	Italy	+ 6' 04"
74	Noemi Cantele	Italy	+ 6' 04"
75	Hanna Nilsson	Sweden	+ 6' 04"
76	Evelyn Arys	Belgium	+ 6' 04"
77	Kirsten Wild	Netherlands	+ 6' 04"
78	Sandrine Bideau	France	+ 6' 22"
79	Tatiana Guderzo	Italy	+ 7' 01"
80	Lilibeth Chacón García	Venezuela	+ 8' 24"

Rank	Rider	Country	Time
	Lex Albrecht	Canada	OTL
	Miriam Bjørnsrud	Norway	OTL
	Romy Kasper	Germany	DNF
	Loren Rowney	Australia	DNF
	Siobhan Horgan	Ireland	DNF
	Aleksandra Sošenko	Lithuania	DNF
	Sérika Guluma Ortiz	Colombia	DNF
	Doris Schweizer	Switzerland	DNF
	Daniela Pintarelli	Austria	DNF
	Lise Olivier	South Africa	DNF
	Alexandra Chekina	Russia	DNF
	Martina Ritter	Austria	DNF
	Mayuko Hagiwara	Japan	DNF
	Maria Briceno	Venezuela	DNF
	Rimma Luchshenko	Kazakhstan	DNF
	Audrey Cordon	France	DNF
	Sara Mustonen	Sweden	DNF
	Jessica Kihlbom	Sweden	DNF
	Patricia Schwager	Switzerland	DNF
	Sophie Creux	France	DNF
	Joanna van de Winkel	South Africa	DNF
	Katie Colclough	United Kingdom	DNF
	Shelley Olds	United States	DNF
	Emilia Fahlin	Sweden	DNF
	Ellen van Dijk	Netherlands	DNF
	Loes Gunnewijk	Netherlands	DNF
	Emily Collins	New Zealand	DNF
	Eugenia Bujak	Poland	DNF
	Olena Pavlukhina	Ukraine	DNF
	Anna Nahirna	Ukraine	DNF
	Semra Yetiş	Turkey	DNF
	Rotem Gafinovitz	Israel	DNF
	Mia Radotić	Croatia	DNF
	Mayra Del Rocio Rocha	Mexico	DNF
	Kathryn Bertine	Saint Kitts and Nevis	DNF
	Kaat Hannes	Belgium	DNF
	Robyn de Groot	South Africa	DNF
	An-Li Pretorius	South Africa	DNF
	Sari Saarelainen	Finland	DNF
	Polona Batagelj	Slovenia	DNF
	Roberta Monaldini	San Marino	DNF
	Isabelle Söderberg	Sweden	DNF
	Lenore Pipes	Guam	DNF
	Yuliya Martisova	Russia	DNF
	Andrea Graus	Austria	DNF
	Yennifer Cesar	Venezuela	DNF
	Emma Crum	New Zealand	DNF
	Kate Chilcott	New Zealand	DNF
	Martina Sáblíková	Czech Republic	DNF
	Agnė Šilinytė	Lithuania	DNF
	Urša Pintar	Slovenia	DNF
	Pavlína Šulcová	Czech Republic	DNF
