= 2002 Vuelta a Venezuela =

Race details
- Dates: September 3–15
- Stages: 13
- Distance: 2,101 km (1,306 mi)
- Winning time: 48h 01' 16"

Results
Jersey awarded to the overall winner	Winner	Federico Muñoz (COL)	(Distribuidora La Japonesa)
	Second	Franklin Chacón (VEN)	(Loteria del Táchira)
	Third	Manuel Medina (VEN)	(Gobernacíon de Anzoátegui)
	Points	Gil Cordovés (CUB)	(Gobernacíon del Zulía)
	Mountains	Manuel Medina (VEN)	(Gobernacíon de Anzoátegui)
	Youth	Carlos José Ochoa (VEN)	(Gob. Trujillo)
	Sprints	Gil Cordovés (CUB)	(Gobernacíon del Zulía)
	Team	Distribuidora La Japonesa Lotería Oriente	

The 39th edition of the annual Vuelta a Venezuela was held from September 3 to September 15, 2002. The stage race started in Puerto Ordaz, and ended in Barquisimeto. There were a total number of 134 competitors, with 69 cyclists actually finishing the stage race.

== Stages ==
=== 2002-09-03: Circuito en Puerto Ordaz (121.5 km) ===
Place	Stage 1		General Classification	
Place	Name	Time	Name	Time
1.	Gil Cordovés (CUB)	02:49.03	Gil Cordovés (CUB)	02:48.56
2.	Pedro Pablo Pérez (CUB)	—	Luis Valera (VEN)	+0.01
3.	Diosenis Valdés (VEN)	—	Pedro Pablo Pérez (CUB)	+0.03

=== 2002-09-04: Chaguaramas — Santa Bárbara de Tapirín (209.5 km) ===
Place	Stage 2		General Classification	
Place	Name	Time	Name	Time
1.	Rubén Rangel (VEN)	04:40.44	Rubén Rangel (VEN)	07:29.40
2.	Franklin Chacón (VEN)	+0.12	Franklin Chacón (VEN)	+0.13
3.	Lizardo Benítez (CUB)	—	Gil Cordovés (CUB)	+0.15

=== 2002-09-05: Circuito en Maturin (86 km) ===
Place	Stage 3		General Classification	
Place	Name	Time	Name	Time
1.	Domingo González (MEX)	02:28.46	Rubén Rangel (VEN)	09:58.28
2.	Gil Cordovés (CUB)	+0.02	Gil Cordovés (CUB)	+0.05
3.	Frederick Segura (VEN)	—	Franklin Chacón (VEN)	+0.13

=== 2002-09-06: Santa Bárbara de Tapirín — Guanta (181 km) ===
Place	Stage 4		General Classification	
Place	Name	Time	Name	Time
1.	Gil Cordovés (CUB)	04:04.49	Franklin Chacón (VEN)	14:03.30
2.	Yosvany Falcón (CUB)	—	Gil Cordovés (CUB)	+0.03
3.	Honorio Machado (VEN)	—	Honorio Machado (VEN)	—

=== 2002-09-07: Puerto Piritu — Valle de la Pascua (178 km) ===
Place	Stage 5		General Classification	
Place	Name	Time	Name	Time
1.	José Chacón Díaz (VEN)	04:27.32	Gil Cordovés (CUB)	18:31.09
2.	Gil Cordovés (CUB)	+0.08	Franklin Chacón (VEN)	+0.01
3.	Domingo González (MEX)	—	Honorio Machado (VEN)	+0.04

=== 2002-09-08: Circuito en Valle de la Pascua (129 km) ===
Place	Stage 6		General Classification	
Place	Name	Time	Name	Time
1.	Frederick Segura (VEN)	02:41.45	Gil Cordovés (CUB)	21:12.49
2.	Gil Cordovés (CUB)	+0.02	Franklin Chacón (VEN)	+0.08
3.	Diosenis Valdés (VEN)	—	Honorio Machado (VEN)	+0.09

=== 2002-09-09: El Sombrero — San Carlos (202.5 km) ===
Place	Stage 7		General Classification	
Place	Name	Time	Name	Time
1.	Dixon Carmona (VEN)	04:46.44	Gil Cordovés (CUB)	26:01.22
2.	José Pérez (VEN)	+0.02	Franklin Chacón (VEN)	+0.08
3.	Damian Martínez (CUB)	+0.42	Honorio Machado (VEN)	+0.09

=== 2002-09-10: San Carlos de Austria — San Felipe (228 km) ===
Place	Stage 8		General Classification	
Place	Name	Time	Name	Time
1.	Néstor Chacón (VEN)	04:10.19	Gil Cordovés (CUB)	30:14.25
2.	Ramil Gaifullin (RUS)	+0.04	Franklin Chacón (VEN)	+0.11
3.	Damian Martínez (CUB)	+1.48	Honorio Machado (VEN)	+0.12

=== 2002-09-11: Campo Elías — San Felipe (31.5 km) ===
Place	Stage 9-A (Individual Time Trial)		General Classification	
Place	Name	Time	Name	Time
1.	Federico Muñoz (COL)	00:44.55	Federico Muñoz (COL)	30:59.41
2.	Franklin Chacón (VEN)	+0.51	Franklin Chacón (VEN)	+0.40
3.	Álvaro Lozano (COL)	+0.53	Carlos José Ochoa (VEN)	+1.46

=== 2002-09-11: Circuito en San Felipe (86.5 km) ===
Place	Stage 9-B		General Classification	
Place	Name	Time	Name	Time
1.	Gil Cordovés (CUB)	01:40.48	Federico Muñoz (COL)	32:40.29
2.	Pedro Pablo Pérez (CUB)	—	Franklin Chacón (VEN)	+0.40
3.	Diosenis Valdés (VEN)	+0.05	Carlos José Ochoa (VEN)	+1.46

=== 2002-09-12: Carora — Cabimas (182.5 km) ===
Place	Stage 10		General Classification	
Place	Name	Time	Name	Time
1.	Gil Cordovés (CUB)	04:38.58	Federico Muñoz (COL)	37:19.27
2.	Diosenis Valdés (VEN)	—	Franklin Chacón (VEN)	+0.40
3.	Wendy Cruz (DOM)	+0.05	Carlos José Ochoa (VEN)	+1.46

=== 2002-09-13: Cabimas — Valera (178 km) ===
Place	Stage 11		General Classification	
Place	Name	Time	Name	Time
1.	Manuel Medina (VEN)	04:20.45	Federico Muñoz (COL)	41:40.59
2.	Robinson Merchán (VEN)	—	Franklin Chacón (VEN)	+0.40
3.	Raúl Saavedra (VEN)	+0.06	Manuel Medina (VEN)	+1.40

=== 2002-09-14: La Gran Parada — Quibor (148.5 km) ===
Place	Stage 12		General Classification	
Place	Name	Time	Name	Time
1.	Pedro Pablo Pérez (CUB)	03:35.14	Federico Muñoz (COL)	45:16.13
2.	Damian Martínez (CUB)	—	Franklin Chacón (VEN)	+0.40
3.	Honorio Machado (VEN)	—	Manuel Medina (VEN)	+1.40

=== 2002-09-15: Circuito Avenue Ribereña, Barquisimeto (120 km) ===
Place	Stage 13		General Classification	
Place	Name	Time	Name	Time
1.	Álvaro Lozano (COL)	02:36.38	Federico Muñoz (COL)	48:01.16
2.	Néstor Chacón (VEN)	+3.41	Franklin Chacón (VEN)	+0.40
3.	Johan Ramírez (COL)	+3.56	Manuel Medina (VEN)	+1.40

== Final classification ==
RANK	NAME	TEAM	TIME
1.	Federico Muñoz (COL)	Distribuidora La Japonesa Lotería Oriente	48:01:16
2.	Franklin Chacón (VEN)	Lotería del Táchira A	+ 0.40
3.	Manuel Medina (VEN)	Gobernacíon de Anzoátegui	+ 1.40
4.	Carlos José Ochoa (VEN)	Gobernacíon Trujillo Cafe Flor de Patría	+ 1.46
5.	Tommy Alcedo (VEN)	Lotería del Táchira B	+ 1.57
6.	John Nava (VEN)	Lotería del Táchira A	+ 1.59
7.	Danny Yepez (VEN)	Gobernación del Zulia-Alcaldia de Cabimas A	+ 2.47
8.	Nélson Gelves (VEN)	Gobernación del Zulia-Alcaldia de Cabimas A	+ 3.05
9.	Honorio Machado (VEN)	Distribuidora La Japonesa Lotería Oriente	+ 3.25
10.	Luis Valera (VEN)	Alcaldia Tinaco Cojedes	+ 3.46

== Teams ==
Lotería del Táchira A

1. (Venezuela) José Chacón Díaz
2. (Venezuela) Manuel Guevara
3. (Venezuela) Franklin Chacón
4. (Venezuela) Édgar Ortega
5. (Venezuela) Arlex Méndez
6. (Venezuela) John Nava

Cuban National Team

7. (Cuba) Pedro Pablo Pérez
8. (Cuba) Luis Alberto Romero
9. (Cuba) Yosvani Falcón
10. (Cuba) Lizardo Benítez
11. (Cuba) Damian Martínez
12. (Cuba) William Leyva

Gobernación del Zulia-Alcaldia de Cabimas A

13. (Colombia) Álvaro Lozano
14. (Colombia) Héctor Castaño
15. (Venezuela) Adelso Valero
16. (Venezuela) Francisco Landaeta
17. (Venezuela) Nélson Gelves
18. (Venezuela) Danny Yepez

Gobernación de Trujillo-Café Flor de Patria

19. (Venezuela) Rodolfo Camacho
20. (Venezuela) José Alirio Contreras
21. (Venezuela) Jonis Ortiz
22. (Venezuela) Carlos José Ochoa
23. (Venezuela) Giner Veda
24. (Venezuela) Andris Hernández

Lotería del Táchira B

25. (Venezuela) Tommy Alcedo
26. (Venezuela) Dixon Carmona
27. (Venezuela) Robinson Merchán
28. (Venezuela) Néstor Chacón
29. (Venezuela) Yeison Delgado
30. (Venezuela) Osney Contreras

Gobernación de Anzoátegui

31. (Venezuela) Manuel Medina
32. (Venezuela) Rubén Rangel
33. (Venezuela) Rubén Cañizales
34. (Venezuela) Hussein Monsalve
35. (Venezuela) Jonathan Mendoza
36. (Venezuela) Tomás Gil

Gobernación del Zulia-Alcaldia de Cabimas B

37. (Cuba) Gil Cordovés
38. (Colombia) Víctor Hugo González
39. (Venezuela) Mario Figueroa
40. (Venezuela) Deivis Urdaneta
41. (Venezuela) Juan Jiménez
42. (Venezuela) Julio Parra

Kino Táchira

43. (Venezuela) Ronald González
44. (Venezuela) José Norberto Ulloa
45. (Venezuela) Paúl Torres
46. (Venezuela) Rubén Chacón
47. (Venezuela) Miguel Chacón
48. (Venezuela) Édgar Chacón

Irdeg Guarico

49. (Venezuela) Ronald Cova
50. (Venezuela) Jean Belisario
51. (Venezuela) Ángel Nieves
52. (Venezuela) José Cheremos
53. (Venezuela) Yonier Infante
54. (Venezuela) Anthony Brea

Alcaldia Tinaco Cojedes

55. (Venezuela) José Loyo
56. (Venezuela) José Pérez
57. (Venezuela) Juan Lincon
58. (Venezuela) Luis Valera
59. (Venezuela) José Hermoso
60. (Venezuela) Luis Díaz

Gobernación de Barinas-Alc Socopo-Lotería Paraiso

61. (Venezuela) Ramón Herrera
62. (Venezuela) Jean Méndez
63. (Venezuela) Alvis Contreras
64. (Venezuela) Hernán Pérez
65. (Colombia) Javier Álvarez
66. (Colombia) Emilson Díaz

Gobernación del Zulia-Alcaldia de Cabimas C

67. (Colombia) Raúl Saavedra
68. (Colombia) Julio César Rangel
69. (Venezuela) José Caldera
70. (Venezuela) Alvis Meléndez
71. (Venezuela) Alejandro Blanco
72. (Venezuela) Edison Fernández

Distribuidora La Japonesa-Lotería Oriente

73. (Venezuela) José Guillermo Barrios
74. (Venezuela) Honorio Machado
75. (Venezuela) Henry Menéses
76. (Venezuela) Tomy Linares
77. (Colombia) Federico Muñoz
78. (Colombia) Eduardo Guerrero

Dominican Republic National Team

79. (Dominican Republic) Wendy Cruz
80. (Dominican Republic) Branly Núñez
81. (Dominican Republic) Jorge Cordero
82. (Dominican Republic) Wendy Palacios
83. (Dominican Republic) Benigno de la Cruz
84. (Dominican Republic) Augusto Sánchez

Russian National Team

85. (Russia) Vladimir Efimkin
86. (Russia) Evgyeni Zhadkevitch
87. (Russia) Denis Kudashev
88. (Russia) Alexei Bougrov
89. (Russia) Ivan Rybakov
90. (Russia) Ramil Gaifulline

Que Viva El Huila (Colombia)

91. (Colombia) Juan Fonseca
92. (Colombia) Johan Ramírez
93. (Colombia) Jorge Guevara
94. (Colombia) Enrique Ospina
95. (Colombia) Carlos Urán
96. (Colombia) Didier Méndez

Selección Bolívar

97. (Venezuela) José Bartolomé
98. (Venezuela) Jean Porte
99. (Venezuela) José Devera
100. (Venezuela) José Piar
101. (Venezuela) Jefrid Mendoza

México

102. (Mexico) Andrés Contreras
103. (Mexico) Carlos Manuel Hernández
104. (Mexico) David Álvarez
105. (Mexico) Domingo González
106. (Mexico) Manuel Carbajal

Alcaldía Caroni Bolivar

107. (Venezuela) Edgar Arreaza
108. (Venezuela) Silfredo Arreaza
109. (Venezuela) Ricardo Gracia
110. (Venezuela) Diomer Salazar

Fundadeporte Jesús Torito Romero-Rio Caribe Sucre

111. (Colombia) Gustavo Guzmán
112. (Venezuela) Anibal Marín
113. (Venezuela) Jose Bruzual
114. (Venezuela) Mario Subero

Tucán Amazonas

115. (Venezuela) Williams Quinto
116. (Venezuela) José Rodríguez
117. (Venezuela) Miguel Reina
118. (Colombia) José Serpa

Distribuidora Japonesa-Lotería Oriente TLM Indem

119. (Venezuela) José Machado
120. (Venezuela) José Pino
121. (Venezuela) Diosenis Valdés
122. (Venezuela) Frederick Segura

Equipo Mixto

123. (Venezuela) Lucidio Escalona
124. (Venezuela) Wilmer Vásquez
125. (Venezuela) Daniel Bermúdez
126. (Venezuela) Reinaldo Bellays
127. (Venezuela) Héctor Francia
128. (Venezuela) Tomás Rodríguez

Fundadeporte Carabobo

129. (Venezuela) José Pérez
130. (Colombia) José Aguilar
131. (Venezuela) Giorgio Landaeta
132. (Venezuela) Maximo Rojas
133. (Venezuela) Luis Ochoa
134. (Venezuela) Erick García
