= Cycling at the 2013 Bolivarian Games =

- Dates: 17–26 November 2013
- Nations: 11

Cycling (Spanish: Ciclismo), for the 2013 Bolivarian Games, took place from 17 November to 26 November 2013.

Within this sport, there are four different cycling disciplines: BMX racing (Spanish: Ciclismo BMX), Mountain biking (Spanish: Ciclismo de Montaña), Road racing (Spanish: Ciclismo de Ruta), and Track cycling (Spanish: Ciclismo Pista).

== Medal summary ==
=== BMX ===
Event	Gold		Silver		Bronze	
Men's events
Time trial	Carlos Oquendo (COL)	30.27	Carlos Ramírez (COL)	30.52	Alfredo Campo (ECU)	30.62
20-inch wheel	Alfredo Campo (ECU)	n/a	Carlos Oquendo (COL)	n/a	Andrés Jiménez (COL)	n/a
Women's events
Time trial	Mariana Pajón (COL)	33.86	Stefany Hernández (VEN)	34.67	Estefania Gómez (COL)	36.32
20-inch wheel	Mariana Pajón (COL)	n/a	Stefany Hernández (VEN)	n/a	Estefania Gómez (COL)	n/a

=== Mountain biking ===
Event	Gold		Silver		Bronze	
Men's events
Cross-country	Héctor Leonardo Páez (COL)	1:31.41	Fabio Castañeda (COL)	1:34.02	Gonzalo Eduardo Aravena García (CHI)	1:35.57
Downhill	Marcelo Gutiérrez (COL)	2:17.62	Mario Jose Jarrin Molina (ECU)	2:17.81	Rafael Gutiérrez (COL)	2:18.79
Women's events
Cross-country	Ángela Parra (COL)	1:15.48	Alexandra Gabriela Serrano Rodriguez (ECU)	1:16.23	Laura Abril (COL)	1:20.35

=== Road cycling ===
Event	Gold		Silver		Bronze	
Men's events
Time trial individual 40 km	Brayan Ramírez (COL)	49:04.471	Segundo Navarrete (ECU)	49:38.453	Yonder Godoy (VEN)	49:42.817
Road race	Fernando Gaviria (COL)	3:18:11	Gonzalo Garrido (CHI)	3:18:11	Byron Guamá (ECU)	3:18:11
Women's events
Time trial individual 30 km	María Luisa Calle (COL)	31:05.348	Danielys García (VEN)	31:12.468	Angie González (VEN)	32:01.740
Road race	Lilibeth Chacón (VEN)	2:05:35	María Luisa Calle (COL)	2:06:24	Diana Peñuela (COL)	2:12:11

=== Track cycling ===
Event	Gold		Silver		Bronze	
Men's events
1 km time trial	Fabián Puerta (COL)	1:03.766	Santiago Ramírez (COL)	1:05.146	Yhonny Araujo (VEN)	1:05.456
Keirin	Fabián Puerta (COL)	10.758	Yhonny Araujo (VEN)	n/a	Hersony Canelón (VEN)	n/a
Madison	Colombia; Juan Esteban Arango; Fernando Gaviria	36	Chile; Antonio Cabrera; Luis Fernando Sepúlveda	27	Venezuela; Manuel Briceño; Richard Ochoa	15
Ominium	Fernando Gaviria (COL)	13	Carlos Linarez (VEN)	14	Cristopher Mansilla (CHI)	22
4 km individual pursuit	Juan Esteban Arango (COL)	5:03.098	Jhonatan Restrepo (COL)	5:10.798	Manuel Briceño (VEN)	n/a
4 km team pursuit	Colombia; Juan Sebastián Molano; Arles Castro; Juan Esteban Arango; Jordan Parra	n/a	Venezuela; Víctor Moreno; Manuel Briceño; Clever Martínez; Richard Ochoa	OVL	Chile; Luis Fernando Sepúlveda; Luis Mansilla; Felipe Peñaloza; Antonio Cabrera	n/a
Points race	Juan Esteban Arango (COL)	96 points	Luis Fernando Sepúlveda (CHI)	96 points	Jorge Montenegro (ECU)	96 points
Scratch	Jordan Parra (COL)	n/a	Maximo Rojas (VEN)	n/a	Luis Mansilla (CHI)	n/a
Sprint	Fabián Puerta (COL)	n/a	Hersony Canelón (VEN)	n/a	Anderson Parra (COL)	n/a
Team sprint	Venezuela; César Marcano; Ángel Pulgar; Hersony Canelón	37.580	Colombia; Fabián Puerta; Rubén Murillo; Santiago Ramírez	38.095	Ecuador; Jamil Intriago; Ricki Gordillo; Cristopher Samaniego	39.095
Women's events
500m time trial	Juliana Gaviria (COL)	35.041	Diana García (COL)	35.311	Marynes Prada (VEN)	37.029
Keirin	Juliana Gaviria (COL)	12.348	Marynes Prada (VEN)	n/a	Karen Cruz (ESA)	n/a
Ominium	Jennifer Cesar (VEN)	12	Milena Salcedo (COL)	14	Paola Muñoz (CHI)	19
Points race	Karla Vallejos (CHI)	42	Danielys García (VEN)	41	Cynthia Lee (GUA)	28
3 km individual pursuit	Lilibeth Chacón (VEN)	3:49.665	María Luisa Calle (COL)	3:50.724	Jessica Parra (COL)	n/a
4 km team pursuit	Venezuela; Angie González; Danielys García; Jennifer Cesar; Lilibeth Chacón	4:51.162	Colombia; Jessica Parra; Lorena Vargas; Milena Salcedo; María Luisa Calle	4:51.668	Chile; Denísse Ahumada; Valentina Monsalve; Paola Muñoz; Karla Vallejos	n/a
Scratch	Danielys García (VEN)	n/a	Jennifer Cesar (VEN)	n/a	Nicolle Bruderer (GUA)	n/a
Sprint	Juliana Gaviria (COL)	n/a	Diana García (COL)	n/a	Marynes Prada (VEN)	n/a
sprint	Colombia; Juliana Gaviria; Diana García	28.797	Ecuador; Estefany Torres; Genesis Enriquez	30.677	Venezuela; Marynes Prada; Zuralmy Rivas	30.823

== Medal table ==
* Host nation (Peru)

Rank	Nation	Gold	Silver	Bronze	Total
1	Colombia (COL)	22	12	8	42
2	Venezuela (VEN)	6	11	9	26
3	Ecuador (ECU)	1	4	4	9
4	Chile (CHI)	1	3	6	10
5	Guatemala (GUA)	0	0	2	2
6	El Salvador (ESA)	0	0	1	1
Totals (6 entries)		30	30	30	90
