= Gleydimar Tapia =

Venezuelan bicycle racer

Personal information
- Full name: Gleydimar Tapia Romero
- Born: 27 February 1992 (age 34) Venezuela

Cycling career
- Sport: Cycling
- Current team: Retired
- Disciplines: Road; Track
- Role: Rider

Professional team
- 2016: Bizkaia–Durango

Gleydimar Tapia Romero (born 27 February 1992) is a Venezuelan former road and track cyclist. She competed at the 2015 Pan American Games.

== Major results ==
2012
National Track Championships

1st Sprint
1st Keirin
1st 500m time trial

2013
National Track Championships

1st Sprint
1st Keirin
1st 500m time trial

1st Sprint, Copa Cobernador de Carabobo
Pan American Track Championships

3rd Sprint
3rd Team sprint

2014
2nd Clasico FVCiclismo Corre Por la VIDA
7th Copa Federación Venezolana de Ciclismo
2015
1st Copa Federación Venezolana de Ciclismo
1st Team pursuit, Copa Cuba de Pista (with Jennifer Cesar, Leidimar Suárez & Zuralmy Rivas)
1st Mountains classification Vuelta Internacional Femenina a Costa Rica
Copa Venezuela

2nd Omnium
3rd 500m time trial

3rd Road race, National Road Championships
4th Clasico FVCiclismo Corre Por la VIDA
6th Road race, Pan American Road Championships
10th Road race, Pan American Games
