= 2006 Vuelta a Venezuela =

2005–2006 UCI America Tour

Race details
- Dates: August 28 – September 10
- Stages: 14
- Distance: 2,137 km (1,328 mi)
- Winning time: 48h 52' 05"

Results
Jersey awarded to the overall winner	Winner	José Serpa (COL)	(Selle Italia)
	Second	José Castelblanco (VEN)	(Gobernacíon del Zulía)
	Third	José Chacón Díaz (VEN)	(Loteria del Táchira)
	Points	Gil Cordovés (CUB)	(Gobernacíon del Zulía)
	Mountains	Jackson Rodríguez (VEN)	(Loteria del Tachirá)
	Sprints	Gil Cordovés (CUB)	(Gobernacíon del Zulía)
	Team	Lotería del Táchira	

The 43rd edition of the annual Vuelta a Venezuela was held from August 28 to September 10, 2006. The stage race started in Guasdualito, and ended in Maturín.

== Stages ==
=== 2006-08-28: Circuito Guasdualito (114 km) ===
Place	Stage 1		General Classification	
Place	Name	Time	Name	Time
1.	Gil Cordovés (CUB)	02:26.18	Gil Cordovés (CUB)	02:26.05
2.	Angelo Furlan (ITA)	—	Angelo Furlan (ITA)	+0.07
3.	Víctor Moreno (VEN)	—	Víctor Moreno (VEN)	+0.09

=== 2006-08-29: Abejales — Barinas (202.2 km) ===
Place	Stage 2		General Classification	
Place	Name	Time	Name	Time
1.	Juan Murillo (VEN)	04:46.53	Víctor Moreno (VEN)	07:12.57
2.	César Suárez (VEN)	—	Juan Murillo (VEN)	+0.04
3.	Víctor Moreno (VEN)	—	César Suárez (VEN)	+0.08

=== 2006-08-30: Barinas — Acarigua (189.4 km) ===
Place	Stage 3		General Classification	
Place	Name	Time	Name	Time
1.	Gil Cordovés (CUB)	04:25.36	Víctor Moreno (VEN)	11:38.33
2.	Angelo Furlan (ITA)	—	Juan Murillo (VEN)	+0.04
3.	Miguel Chacón (VEN)	—	César Suárez (VEN)	+0.08

=== 2006-08-31: Turén — Turén (47.5 km) ===
Place	Stage 4 (Individual Time Trial)		General Classification	
Place	Name	Time	Name	Time
1.	José Serpa (COL)	00:59.01	Víctor Moreno (VEN)	12:38.27
2.	Edgardo Simón (ARG)	+0.49	José Serpa (COL)	+0.43
3.	Víctor Moreno (VEN)	+0.52	Edgardo Simón (ARG)	+1.31

=== 2006-09-01: Acarigua — Sanare (143.5 km) ===
Place	Stage 5		General Classification	
Place	Name	Time	Name	Time
1.	Jackson Rodríguez (VEN)	03:31.31	José Serpa (COL)	16:11.15
2.	José Chacón Díaz (VEN)	+0.34	Víctor Moreno (VEN)	+0.29
3.	Franklin Chacón (VEN)	—	José Castelblanco (COL)	+1.00

=== 2006-09-02: Chivacoa — Maracay (200.4 km) ===
Place	Stage 6		General Classification	
Place	Name	Time	Name	Time
1.	Gil Cordovés (CUB)	04:38.32	José Serpa (COL)	20:49.47
2.	Anthony Brea (VEN)	—	Víctor Moreno (VEN)	+0.29
3.	Wilmer Bravo (VEN)	—	José Castelblanco (COL)	+1.00

=== 2006-09-03: Caracas Circuito (111.6 km) ===
Place	Stage 7		General Classification	
Place	Name	Time	Name	Time
1.	Gil Cordovés (CUB)	02:32.07	José Serpa (COL)	23:21.54
2.	Anthony Brea (VEN)	—	Víctor Moreno (VEN)	+0.28
3.	Jesús Pérez (VEN)	—	José Castelblanco (COL)	+1.00

=== 2006-09-04: Los Teques — San Juan de los Morros (146 km) ===
Place	Stage 8		General Classification	
Place	Name	Time	Name	Time
1.	Manuel Medina (VEN)	03:01.13	José Serpa (COL)	26:24.41
2.	Daniel Medina (VEN)	—	Víctor Moreno (VEN)	+0.28
3.	César Salazar (COL)	—	José Castelblanco (COL)	+1.00

=== 2006-09-05: Ortiz — Valle de la Pascua (163 km) ===
Place	Stage 9		General Classification	
Place	Name	Time	Name	Time
1.	Gil Cordovés (CUB)	03:40.13	José Serpa (COL)	30:04.54
2.	Anthony Brea (VEN)	—	Víctor Moreno (VEN)	+0.27
3.	Jesús Pérez (VEN)	—	José Castelblanco (COL)	+1.00

=== 2006-09-06: Valle de la Pascua — El Tigre (223 km) ===
Place	Stage 10		General Classification	
Place	Name	Time	Name	Time
1.	John Nava (VEN)	05:08.59	José Serpa (COL)	35:14.49
2.	Disson Carmona (VEN)	—	Víctor Moreno (VEN)	+0.27
3.	Antonio Ortíz (VEN)	—	José Castelblanco (COL)	+1.00

=== 2006-09-07: El Tigre — Puerto la Cruz (171.3 km) ===
Place	Stage 11		General Classification	
Place	Name	Time	Name	Time
1.	Gil Cordovés (CUB)	03:48.24	José Serpa (COL)	39:03.13
2.	Jesús Pérez (VEN)	—	Víctor Moreno (VEN)	+0.24
3.	Edgardo Simón (ARG)	—	José Castelblanco (COL)	+1.00

=== 2006-09-08: Puerto la Cruz — Cumaná (132.2 km) ===
Place	Stage 12		General Classification	
Place	Name	Time	Name	Time
1.	Frederick Segura (VEN)	03:23.34	José Serpa (COL)	42:26.47
2.	Víctor Moreno (VEN)	—	Víctor Moreno (VEN)	+0.18
3.	Anthony Brea (VEN)	—	José Castelblanco (COL)	+1.00

=== 2006-09-09: Cumaná — Punta de Mata (173.3 km) ===
Place	Stage 13		General Classification	
Place	Name	Time	Name	Time
1.	Anthony Brea (VEN)	04:11.26	José Serpa (COL)	46:38.12
2.	Franklin Chacón (VEN)	—	José Castelblanco (COL)	+1.01
3.	José Alirio Contreras (VEN)	—	José Chacón Díaz (VEN)	+2.13

=== 2006-09-10: Maturín Circuito, (112 km) ===
Place	Stage 14		General Classification	
Place	Name	Time	Name	Time
1.	Gil Cordovés (CUB)	02:13.53	José Serpa (COL)	48:52.05
2.	Bernardo Díaz (VEN)	—	José Castelblanco (COL)	+1.01
3.	Víctor Moreno (VEN)	—	José Chacón Díaz (VEN)	+2.13

== Final classification ==
RANK	NAME	TEAM	TIME
1.	José Serpa (COL)	Selle Italia	48:52:05
2.	José Castelblanco (COL)	Gobernacíon del Zulía	+ 1.01
3.	José Chacón Díaz (VEN)	Loteria del Táchira	+ 2.13
4.	César Salazar (COL)	Kino Táchira	+ 2.14
5.	Manuel Medina (VEN)	Gobernacíon del Zulía	+ 2.32
6.	Franklin Chacón (VEN)	Loteria del Táchira	+ 2.42
7.	Alexander Giraldo (COL)	Selle Italia	+ 3.30
8.	Carlos Escalona (VEN)	Triple Gordo Gob Lara	+ 4.51
9.	Jackson Rodríguez (VEN)	Loteria del Táchira	+ 5.00
10.	Rodolfo Camacho (VEN)	Loteria del Táchira	+ 5.19
