= Venezuelan National Road Race Championships =

National road cycling championship in Venezuela

The Venezuelan national champions jersey

The Venezuelan National Road Race Championships are held annually, and are governed by the Venezuelan Cycling Federation (in Spanish: Federación Venezolana de Ciclismo). The event also includes the Venezuelan National Time Trial Championships.

== Multiple winners ==
Wins	Rider	Years
3	Leonardo Sierra	1991, 1992, 1993
3	Miguel Ubeto	2011, 2012, 2017
2	Tommy Alcedo	2000, 2002

== Men ==
=== Elite ===
Year	Gold	Silver	Bronze
1991	Leonardo Sierra	Richard Gustavo Parra	Alexis Omar Méndez
1992	Leonardo Sierra (2)	Luis Barroso	Carlos Maya
1993	Leonardo Sierra (3)	Carlos Maya	Alexis Omar Méndez
1999	Manuel Guevara	Robinson Merchán	Alexis Méndez
2000	Tommy Alcedo	José Chacón Díaz	Robinson Merchán
2001	Nestor Chacón	Hussein Monsalve	Jonathan Mendoza
2002	Tommy Alcedo (2)	Guillermo Barrios	John Nava
2003	Tony Linarez	John Nava	Ángel López
2004	José Chacón Díaz	Aldrin Salamanca	Tomás Gil
2005	Wilmer Vasquez	Tommy Alcedo	Franklin Chacón
2006	Manuel Medina	Jonathan Hernández	José Alirio Contreras
2007	Tomás Gil	Anthony Brea	Miguel Chacón
2008	Noel Vasquez	Manuel Medina	Jhonathan Camargo
2009	Honorio Machado	Jesús Pérez	Artur García
2010	José Alirio Contreras	Carlos José Ochoa	Daniel Abreu
2011	Miguel Ubeto	Richard Ochoa	Jesús Pérez
2012	Miguel Ubeto (2)	Frederick Segura	Jackson Rodríguez
2013	Eduin Becerra	Juan Murillo	Yonathan Salinas
2014	Xavier Quevedo	Gil Cordovés	Honorio Machado
2015	Juan Murillo	Miguel Ubeto	Enrique Luis Diaz
2016	Gusneiver Gil	Carlos Torres	Roniel Campos
2017	Miguel Ubeto (3)	Rafael Medina	Anderson Timoteo Paredes
2018	Ralph Monsalve	Artur García	Clever Martínez
2019	Jesus Villegas	Orluis Aular	Pedro Sequera
2020	Robert Sierra	Xavier Nuevas	Orluis Aular
2021	Luis Gómez	Ángel Pulgar	Robert Sierra
2022	Orluis Aular	Xavier Quevedo	Yurgen Ramírez

=== U23 ===
Year	Gold	Silver	Bronze
2009	Jonathan Monsalve	Yosvangs Rojas	Álvaro Torres
2010	Jonathan Monsalve	Luis Gelvez	José Alarcón
2011	Sebastian Anaya	Jorge Abreu	Xavier Quevedo
2012	Xavier Quevedo	Jonathan Monsalve	Italo Hernández
2013	Yonder Godoy	Pedro Sequera	Rosales Marquez
2014	Enrique Luis Diaz	Xavier Nieves	Yonder Godoy
2015	Isaac Yaguaro	Carlos Giménez	Carlos Molina
2016	Anderson Timoteo Paredes	Darwin Montilla	Henry Meneses
2017	Anderson Timoteo Paredes	Leonel Quintero	Fredy Rico
2018	Luis Colmenárez	José Bruzual	Yurgen Ramírez
2019	Jesús Villegas	Yurgen Ramírez	César Sanabria
2020	Germán Rincón	José Andrés Díaz	Jeison Rujano
2021	José Andrés Díaz	Airton Cabral	Cristhian Laya
2022	Yohandri Rubio	Yenfron Guerrero	Airton Cabral

== Women ==
=== Elite ===
Year	First	Second	Third
1999	Anrosi Paruta	Yusbelli Carrasquero	Daniela Larreal
2000	Race not held		
2001	Dayana Chirinos	Jennifer Alzate	Daniela Larreal
2002	Anrosi Paruta	Daniela Larreal	Ismary Orellana
2003	Angie González	Melissa Olivares	Jennifer Guerrero
2004	Race not held		
2005	Blendys Rojas	Angie González	Karelia Machado
2006	María Briceño	Diana Díaz	Karelia Machado
2007	Danielys García	Francimar Pinto	María Briceño
2008	Danielys García	María Briceño	Angie González
2009	María Briceño	Francimar Pinto	Angie González
2010	Danielys García	Fanny Alvarez	Liliana Berrios
2011	Angie González	Fanny Alvarez	María Briceño
2012	Angie González	Danielys García	María Briceño
2013	Danielys García	Keyni Urbina	Zaily Salazar
2014	Danielys García	Keyni Urbina	María Briceño
2015	Jennifer Cesar	Wilmarys Moreno	Gleydimar Tapia
2016	Zuralmy Rivas	Lilibeth Chacón	Jennifer Cesar
2017	Jennifer Cesar	Angie González	Lilibeth Chacón
2018	Yngrid Porras	Wilmarys Moreno	María Briceño
2019	Wilmarys Moreno	Lilibeth Chacón	Zuralmy Rivas
2020	Yngrid Porras	Maria Rueda	Karina Clemant
2021	Wilmarys Moreno	Katherine Clemant	María Briceño
2022	Andisabel Luque	Lilibeth Chacón	Wilmarys Moreno

== See also ==
- Vuelta a Venezuela
- Venezuelan National Time Trial Championships
