= Angie González =

Venezuelan cyclist (born 1981)

Personal information
- Full name: Angie Sabrina González Garcia
- Born: 3 January 1981 (age 45)

Cycling career
- Sport: Cycling
- Disciplines: Road; Track
- Role: Rider
- Rider type: Endurance (track)

Amateur team
- 2013: ISCorp–Intelligentsia Coffee
Medal record
Women's track cycling
Representing Venezuela
Pan American Games
Gold medal – first place	2011 Guadalajara	Omnium
Pan American Championships
Gold medal – first place	2007 Valencia	Team sprint
Silver medal – second place	2006 São Paulo	500 m time trial
Silver medal – second place	2006 São Paulo	Keirin
Silver medal – second place	2010 Aguascalientes	Omnium
Silver medal – second place	2011 Medellin	Team pursuit
Silver medal – second place	2012 Mar del Plata	Omnium
Silver medal – second place	2012 Mar del Plata	Team pursuit
Silver medal – second place	2013 Mexico City	Omnium
Silver medal – second place	2017 Couva	Points race
Bronze medal – third place	2005 Mar del Plata	Sprint
Bronze medal – third place	2006 São Paulo	Sprint
Bronze medal – third place	2007 Valencia	500 m time trial
Bronze medal – third place	2013 Mexico City	Team pursuit
Bronze medal – third place	2014 Aguascalientes	Team pursuit
Bronze medal – third place	2015 Santiago	Omnium
Bronze medal – third place	2017 Couva	Omnium
Central American and Caribbean Games
Gold medal – first place	2010 Mayagüez	Omnium
Gold medal – first place	2010 Mayagüez	Team sprint
Gold medal – first place	2014 Veracruz	Scratch
Silver medal – second place	2010 Mayagüez	Scratch
Bronze medal – third place	2014 Veracruz	Omnium
Women's road cycling
Pan American Championships
Bronze medal – third place	2013 Zacatecas	Road race
Central American and Caribbean Games
Gold medal – first place	2010 Mayagüez	Road race

Angie Sabrina González Garcia (born 3 January 1981) is a Venezuelan track and road cyclist. At the 2008 Summer Olympics, she competed in the women's road race, finishing in 57th place. At the 2012 Summer Olympics, she competed in the Women's Omnium, finishing in 18th (last) place overall.

== Major results ==
=== Road ===
2003
1st Road race, National Road Championships
2005
2nd Road race, National Road Championships
3rd Sprint, Pan American Track Championships
2007
4th Road race, National Road Championships
2008
1st Clasico Aniversario de la Federacion Venezolana de Ciclismo
3rd Road race, National Road Championships
6th Copa Federacion Venezolana de Ciclismo
2009
3rd Road race, National Road Championships
2010
1st Road race, Central American and Caribbean Games
2nd Time trial, National Road Championships
4th Road race, Pan American Road and Track Championships
2011
National Road Championships

1st Road race
2nd Time trial

1st Clásico Aniversario Federacion Ciclista de Venezuela
1st Clasico Corre Por La Vida
7th Road race, Pan American Games
2012
National Road Championships

1st Road race
3rd Time trial

1st Copa Fundadeporte
2nd Road race, Juegos Nacionales Venezuela
2nd Clásico Aniversario Federacion Ciclista de Venezuela
2013
Pan American Road Championships

3rd Road race
6th Time trial

3rd Time trial, Bolivarian Games
2014
1st Copa Federación Venezolana de Ciclismo
National Road Championships

2nd Road race
2nd Time trial

3rd Clasico FVCiclismo Corre Por la VIDA
5th Time trial, Pan American Road Championships
2015
5th Copa Federación Venezolana de Ciclismo
8th Clasico FVCiclismo Corre Por la VIDA
2017
2nd Road race, National Road Championships
2019
1st Tour Femenino de Venezuela I
8th Overall Tour Femenino de Venezuela II

1st Stage 2

2020
2nd Time trial, National Road Championships

=== Track ===
2005
3rd Sprint, Pan American Track Championships
2006
Pan American Track Championships

2nd 500m time trial
2nd Keirin
3rd Sprint

2007
Pan American Road and Track Championships

1st Team sprint (with Karelia Machado)
3rd 500m time trial

2010
Central American and Caribbean Games

1st Omnium
1st Team sprint (with Daniela Larreal)
2nd Scratch

South American Games

2nd Points race
2nd Team pursuit
3rd Team sprint

2nd Omnium, Pan American Track Championships
2011
1st Omnium, Pan American Games
2nd Team pursuit, Pan American Track Championships
2012
National Track Championships

1st Omnium
2nd Points race
2nd Scratch

Pan American Track Championships

2nd Omnium
2nd Team pursuit (with Danielys García and Lilibeth Chacón)

2013
1st Team pursuit, Bolivarian Games
Pan American Track Championships

2nd Omnium
3rd Team pursuit (with Jennifer Cesar and Danielys García)

2014
Central American and Caribbean Games

1st Scratch
3rd Omnium

Copa Venezuela

1st Omnium
1st Points race

3rd Team pursuit, Pan American Track Championships (with Jennifer Cesar, Lilibeth Chacón and Zuralmy Rivas)
2015
1st Omnium, Copa Venezuela
Copa Cuba de Pista

2nd Scratch
3rd Omnium

3rd Omnium, Pan American Track Championships
2016
2nd Scratch, Copa Venezuela
3rd Scratch, Festival of Speed
2017
Bolivarian Games

1st Omnium
1st Scratch

Pan American Track Championships

2nd Points race
3rd Omnium
