= Cycling at the 2010 South American Games – Women's scratch race =

The Women's Scratch Race event at the 2010 South American Games was held on March 20.

== Medalists ==
| Gold | Silver | Bronze |
|---|---|---|
| Lorena Vargas; Colombia | Paola Andrea Grandon; Chile | Janildes Fernandez; Brazil |

== Results ==
Distance: 40 laps (10 km)
Elapsed time: 14:10.863
Average Speed: 42.309 km/h

| Rank | Rider | Laps Down |
|---|---|---|
| 1st place, gold medalist(s) | Lorena Vargas (COL) | |
| 2nd place, silver medalist(s) | Paola Andrea Grandon (CHI) | |
| 3rd place, bronze medalist(s) | Janildes Fernandez (BRA) | |
| 4 | Maria Eugenia Constante (ECU) | |
| 5 | Angie González (VEN) | |
| 6 | Leidy Natalia Muñoz Ruiz (COL) | |
| 7 | Claudia Aravena Cortes (CHI) | |
| 8 | Talia Ayelen Aguirre (ARG) | |
| 9 | Daniela Mishell Carvajal (ECU) | |
| 10 | Tania Castro (ARG) | |
| 11 | Valquiria Pardial (BRA) | |
| 12 | Francismar Pinto (VEN) | |
| | Valeria Bacilia Ruiloba (BOL) | DNF |
