= Zuralmy Rivas =

Venezuelan cyclist

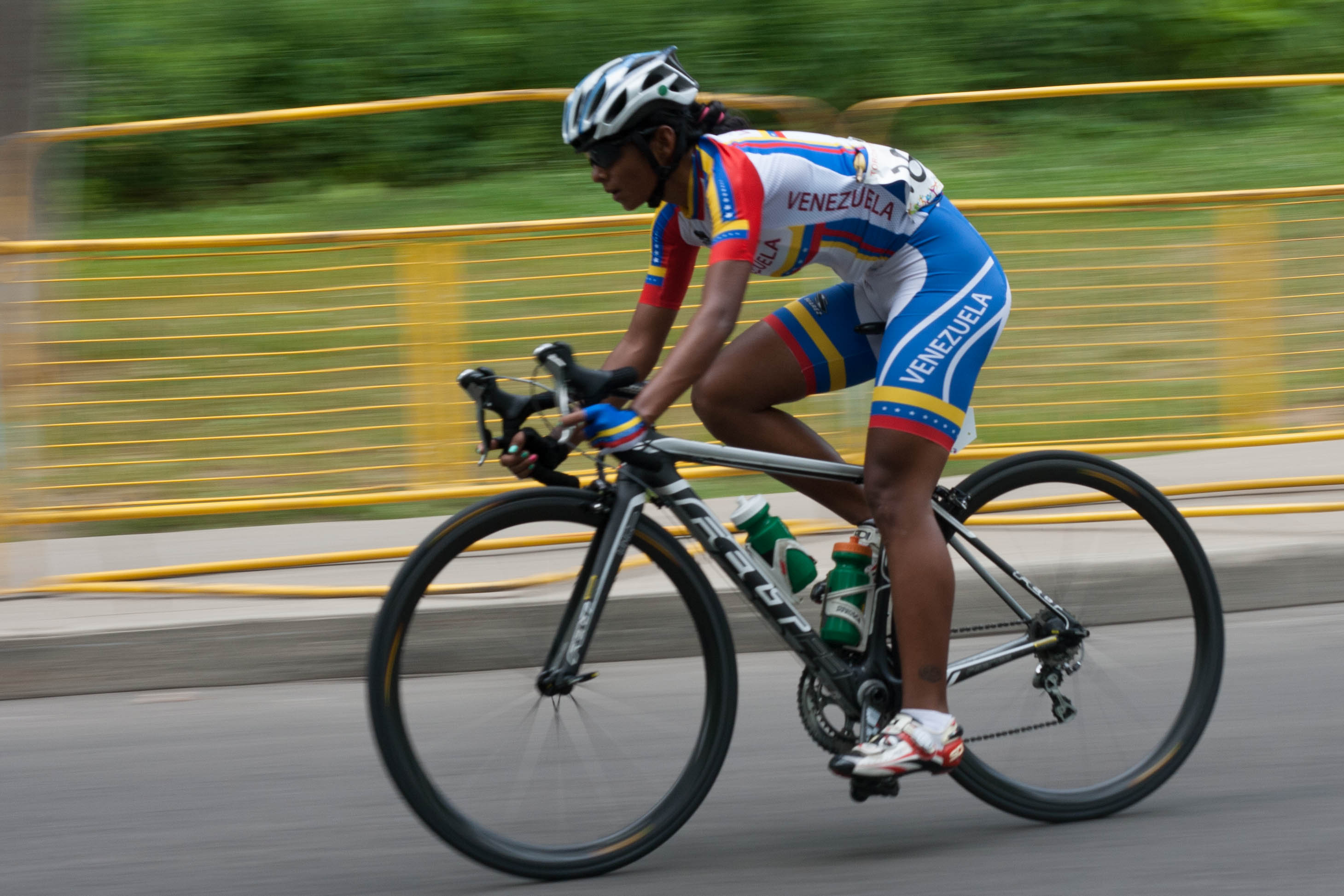
- Rivas at the 2015 Pan American Games

Personal information
- Full name: Zuralmy Coromoto Rivas Molina
- Born: 26 November 1993 (age 32) Venezuela

Cycling career
- Sport: Cycling
- Disciplines: Road; Track
- Role: Rider

Zuralmy Coromoto Rivas Molina (born 26 November 1993) is a Venezuelan track and road cyclist. In 2013, she won bronze at the Bolivarian Games in the team sprint. In 2014, she won the Clasico FVCiclismo Corre Por la VIDA.

== Major results ==
2013
2nd Team pursuit, Copa Cuba de Pista (with Danielys García, Jennifer Cesar and Fanny Alvarez)
3rd Team sprint, Bolivarian Games
2014
1st Clasico FVCiclismo Corre Por la VIDA
Copa Venezuela

2nd Scratch
3rd Individual pursuit
3rd Omnium
3rd 500m time trial

3rd Team pursuit, Pan American Track Cycling Championships (with Jennifer Cesar, Lilibeth Chacón and Angie González)
8th Copa Federación Venezolana de Ciclismo
2015
Copa Venezuela

1st Points race
1st Scratch

7th Clasico FVCiclismo Corre Por la VIDA
2016
1st Road race, National Road Championships
Copa Venezuela

1st Individual pursuit
3rd Scratch

9th Copa Federación Venezolana de Ciclismo
10th Clasico FVCiclismo Corre Por la VIDA
2017
Bolivarian Games

2nd Team pursuit
3rd Scratch

2019
3rd Road race, National Road Championships
10th Tour Femenino de Venezuela I
