= 2014 Copa Federación Venezolana de Ciclismo =

Race details
- Dates: 17 May 2014
- Stages: 1

The 2014 Copa Federación Venezolana de Ciclismo was a one-day women's cycle race held in Venezuela beginning and finishing in San Felipe on 17 May 2014. The race had a UCI rating of 1.2.

== Results ==
	Rider	Team	Time
1	Angie González (VEN)		1h 50' 27"
2	Ingrid Porras (VEN)		+ 3' 59"
3	Lilibeth Chacón (VEN)		+ 3' 59"
4	Laura Lozano (COL)		+ 3' 59"
5	Maria Briceno (VEN)		+ 3' 59"
6	Rosimber Montana (VEN)		+ 4' 01"
7	Gleydimar Tapia (VEN)		+ 6' 15"
8	Zuralmy Rivas (VEN)		+ 6' 15"
9	Ludy Correa (VEN)		+ 6' 15"
10	Danielys Del Valle (VEN)		+ 6' 15"

== See also ==
- 2014 in women's road cycling
