= Cycling at the 2010 South American Games – Women's points race =

The Women's Points Race event at the 2010 South American Games was held on March 21.

== Medalists ==
| Gold | Silver | Bronze |
|---|---|---|
| Lorena Vargas; Colombia | Angie González; Venezuela | Maria Parra Constante; Ecuador |

== Results ==
Distance: 80 laps (20 km) with 8 sprint
Elapsed time: 29:28.614
Average Speed: 40.709 km/h

| Rank | Rider | Sprint | | | | | | | | Finish | Lap Points | | | Total |
| Rank | Rider | 1 | 2 | 3 | 4 | 5 | 6 | 7 | 8 | Finish | + | – | Balance | Total |
|---|---|---|---|---|---|---|---|---|---|---|---|---|---|---|
| 1st place, gold medalist(s) | Lorena Vargas (COL) | 2 | 3 | 2 | 5 | 5 | 5 | 1 | | 7 | | | | 23 |
| 2nd place, silver medalist(s) | Angie González (VEN) | 5 | | 1 | 3 | 3 | 2 | 2 | | 10 | | | | 16 |
| 3rd place, bronze medalist(s) | Maria Parra Constante (ECU) | | | 5 | 2 | 2 | 3 | | 2 | 3 | | | | 14 |
| 4 | Leidy Natalia Muñoz Ruiz (COL) | | | 3 | | | | 5 | 5 | 1 | | | | 13 |
| 5 | Paola Andrea Grandon (CHI) | 3 | 2 | | | | | 3 | 3 | 2 | | | | 11 |
| 6 | Daniela Carvajal (ECU) | | 5 | | | | | | | 12 | | | | 5 |
| 7 | Valeria Teresita Müller (ARG) | | | | 1 | 1 | 1 | | | 9 | | | | 3 |
| 8 | Talia Ayelen Aguirre (ARG) | 1 | 1 | | | | | | | 5 | | | | 2 |
| 9 | Janildes Fernandez (BRA) | | | | | | | | 1 | 4 | | | | 1 |
| 10 | Valquiria Pardial (BRA) | | | | | | | | | 6 | | | | 0 |
| 11 | Olga Elena Muñoz (CHI) | | | | | | | | | 8 | | | | 0 |
| 12 | Francismar Pinto (VEN) | | | | | | | | | 11 | | | | 0 |
