= Honorio Machado =

Venezuelan racing cyclist

Personal information
- Full name: Honorio Rafael Machado Pérez
- Born: 26 July 1982 (age 44) Quíbor, Lara, Venezuela

Cycling career
- Sport: Cycling
- Current team: Retired
- Discipline: Road
- Role: Rider

Amateur teams
- 2004: Gobernacion del Zulia
- 2005: Marchiol–Ima
- 2010: VC Mantovani
- 2011: Gobernio Democratico
- 2013: Canels Turbo
- 2014: Anzoategui Sport
- 2015: Canel's–Specialized

Professional teams
- 2006–2007: Tenax–Salmilano
- 2008: Katay Cycling Team
- 2009: Betonexpressz 2000–Limonta
Medal record
Men's Track cycling
Representing Venezuela
Central American and Caribbean Games
| Bronze medal – third place | 2002 San Salvador | Points race |

Honorio Rafael Machado Pérez (born July 26, 1982 in Quíbor, Lara) is a Venezuelan former professional racing cyclist.

== Major results ==
2002
3rd Points race, Central American and Caribbean Games
2003
1st Stage 7a Vuelta a Venezuela
2004
1st Stage 4 Vuelta al Táchira
10th Road race, Pan American Under-23 Road Championships
2005
1st Stage 5b Vuelta a Sucre
1st Stage 3 Vuelta al Estado Zulia
2nd Circuito del Porto
10th GP Citta di Felino
2007
1st Juegos Nacionales Venezuela
3rd Paris–Brussels
2008
Vuelta a Venezuela

1st Stages 11 & 14

7th Giro di Toscana
8th Gran Premio Città di Misano – Adriatico
2009
1st Road race, National Road Championships
1st Clasico FVCiclismo Corre Por la VIDA
Vuelta a Venezuela

1st Stages 6 & 10

1st Stage 2 Vuelta a Lara
3rd Clasico Aniversario Federacion Ciclista de Venezuela
2010
1st Road race, Central American and Caribbean Games
2011
Vuelta a Venezuela

1st Stages 1 & 5

1st Stage 4 Vuelta al Táchira
2nd Copa Federación Venezolana de Ciclismo Por la Vida
2nd Clásico Aniversario de la Federación Venezolana de Ciclismo
2013
1st Stage 1 Ruta del Centro
2014
7th Overall Volta do Paraná

1st Stages 1 & 4

2015
1st Copa Federación Venezolana de Ciclismo
1st Points classification Vuelta a Guatemala
