= 2014 Pan American Track Cycling Championships =

- Venue: Aguascalientes, Mexico
- Date(s): September 10–14, 2014
- Velodrome: Velódromo Bicentenario
- Events: 19

The 2014 Pan American Track Cycling Championships took place at the Velódromo Bicentenario, Aguascalientes, Mexico on September 10–14, 2014.

== Medal summary ==
=== Men ===
Event	Gold	Silver	Bronze
Sprint	Hersony Canelón; Venezuela	Fabián Puerta; Colombia	Santiago Ramírez; Colombia
1 km time trial	Ángel Pulgar; Venezuela	Anderson Parra; Colombia	Santiago Ramírez; Colombia
Keirin	Fabián Puerta; Colombia	Hugo Barrette; Canada	Hersony Canelón; Venezuela
Scratch	Jorge Luis Montenegro; Ecuador	Luis Mansilla; Chile	Cristopher Mansilla; Chile
Points race	Luis Mansilla; Chile	Manuel Alberto Briceño; Venezuela	Bobby Lea; United States
Individual pursuit	Bobby Lea; United States	Mauro Agostini; Argentina	Víctor Moreno; Venezuela
Omnium	Juan Sebastián Molano; Colombia	Cristopher Mansilla; Chile	Rémi Pelletier-Roy; Canada
Madison	United States; Jacob Duehring; Bobby Lea	Colombia; Jordan Parra; Jhonatan Restrepo	Argentina; Marcos Crespo; Walter Pérez
Team sprint	Venezuela; Hersony Canelón; César Marcano; Ángel Pulgar	Colombia; Rubén Murillo; Fabián Puerta; Santiago Ramírez	Brazil; Dieferson Borges; Kacio Fonseca; Flávio Cipriano
Team pursuit	Colombia; Juan Sebastián Molano; Brayan Sánchez; Arles Castro; Jhonatan Restrepo	Argentina; Mauro Richeze; Juan Dario Merlos; Mauro Agostini; Walter Pérez	Venezuela; Issac Yaguaru; Manuel Alberto Briceño; Randal Figueroa; Víctor Moreno

=== Women ===
Event	Gold	Silver	Bronze
Sprint	Lisandra Guerra; Cuba	Monique Sullivan; Canada	Daniela Larreal; Venezuela
500 m time trial	Lisandra Guerra; Cuba	Juliana Gaviria; Colombia	Mariaesthela Vilera; Venezuela
Keirin	Monique Sullivan; Canada	Gabriela Gomes; Brazil	Daniela Larreal; Venezuela
Individual pursuit	Jasmin Glaesser; Canada	Marlies Mejías; Cuba	María Luisa Calle; Colombia
Points race	Jasmin Glaesser; Canada	Arlenis Sierra; Cuba	María Luisa Calle; Colombia
Scratch	Arlenis Sierra; Cuba	Yareli Salazar; Mexico	Daniela Guajardo; Chile
Omnium	Gillian Carleton; Canada	Marlies Mejías; Cuba	Jennifer Valente; United States
Team sprint	Colombia; Diana García; Juliana Gaviria	Venezuela; Daniela Larreal; Mariaesthela Vilera	Cuba; Marlies Mejías; Lisandra Guerra
Team pursuit	United States; Jennifer Valente; Elizabeth Newell; Amber Gaffney; Kimberly Geist	Cuba; Marlies Mejías; Yumari González; Yoanka González; Yudelmis Domínguez	Venezuela; Angie González; Jennifer Cesar; Lilibeth Chacón; Zuralmy Rivas

== Records ==
Pan American records were set in the following events:

- Men's sprint (flying 200m time trial/qualifying round): 9"549 by Fabián Puerta
- Men's 1 km time trial: 59"743 by Ángel Pulgar
- Men's individual pursuit (qualifying round): 4'14"882 by Mauro Agostini
- Men's team pursuit (gold medal final): 3'57"889 by Colombia (Juan Sebastián Molano, Brayan Sánchez, Arles Castro and Jhonatan Restrepo)
- Women's sprint (flying 200m time trial/qualifying round): 10"667 by Juliana Gaviria
- Women's 500m time trial: 33"036 by Lisandra Guerra
- Women's team sprint (gold medal final): 33"263 by Colombia (Diana García and Juliana Gaviria)

== Medal table ==
Rank	Nation	Gold	Silver	Bronze	Total
1	Colombia (COL)	4	5	4	13
2	Canada (CAN)	4	2	1	7
3	Cuba (CUB)	3	4	1	8
4	Venezuela (VEN)	3	2	7	12
5	United States (USA)	3	0	2	5
6	Chile (CHI)	1	2	2	5
7	Ecuador (ECU)	1	0	0	1
8	Argentina (ARG)	0	2	1	3
9	Brazil (BRA)	0	1	1	2
10	Mexico (MEX)	0	1	0	1
Totals (10 entries)		19	19	19	57
