= John Nava (cyclist) =

Venezuelan racing cyclist

Personal information
- Full name: John Alberto Nava Carvajar
- Born: 6 October 1978 (age 48) Guasdualito, Venezuela

Cycling career
- Sport: Cycling
- Current team: Gobierno Bolivariano de Trujillo
- Discipline: Road
- Role: Rider

Amateur teams
- 2001–2002: Lotería del Táchira
- 2003–2005: Kino Táchira
- 2005: Gobernación Bolivariana de Carabobo
- 2006: Lotería del Táchira–Banfoandes
- 2007–2009: Kino Táchira–Banfoandes
- 2009–2011: Gobernación de Carabobo
- 2011–2015: Kino Táchira
- 2011: Vélo Club Grand Case (guest)
- 2015: UC Moulienne
- 2016–2017: Kino Táchira
- 2017–2019: Gwada Bikers 118
- 2018: SuBicicleta.com–Osorio Motos
- 2019: Loteria del Táchira
- 2020–2021: Deportivo Táchira-JHS
- 2022–: Gobierno Bolivariano de Trujillo–Orbea

John Alberto Nava Carvajar (born 6 October 1978) is a Venezuelan professional road racing cyclist.

== Major results ==
1999
5th Overall Vuelta a Venezuela
2002
3rd Road race, National Road Championships
6th Overall Vuelta a Venezuela
2003
2nd Road race, National Road Championships
2005
3rd Overall Vuelta al Estado Portuguesa

1st Stages 1 & 2a

2006
1st Overall Clásico Virgen de la Consolación de Táriba
1st Overall Vuelta al Estado Yaracuy

1st Stage 2

1st Stage 2b Vuelta al Oriente
1st Stage 10 Vuelta a Venezuela
2007
1st Stage 1 Vuelta Internacional al Estado Trujillo
2009
1st Overall Vuelta Ciclista Aragua

1st Stage 2

5th Overall Vuelta al Estado Portuguesa
2010
Vuelta al Táchira

1st Stages 1 (TTT) & 10

4th Overall Tour de Guadeloupe
2011
1st Stage 12 Vuelta al Táchira
1st Stage 5 Tour de Guadeloupe
7th Overall Vuelta a Venezuela
2012
5th Overall Vuelta a Venezuela
2014
1st Overall Tour de Guadeloupe

1st Combination classification
1st Stage 8b (ITT)

3rd Overall Vuelta a Venezuela
9th Overall Vuelta al Táchira
2015
9th Overall Vuelta al Táchira

1st Stage 7

2018
1st Stage 7 Vuelta a Venezuela
4th Overall Tour de Guadeloupe
2019
6th Overall Tour de Guadeloupe
