= César Suárez =

César Suárez can refer to:

- César Suárez (cyclist) (born 1984), Venezuelan professional cyclist
- César Suárez (prosecutor) (1985–2024), Ecuadorian prosecutor and lawyer
