= Cycling at the 2010 South American Games – Women's team pursuit =

The Women's Team Pursuit event at the 2010 South American Games was held on March 19.

== Medalists ==
Gold	Silver	Bronze
María Luisa Calle; Leidy Natalia Muñoz Ruiz; Lorena Vargas; Colombia	Angie González; Maria Briceno; Francismar Pinto; Venezuela	Janildes Fernandes; Valquiria Pardial; Fernanda Souza; Brazil

== Results ==
=== Qualification ===
Rank	Team	1000m	2000m	Final	Speed	Q
1	Colombia; María Luisa Calle; Leidy Natalia Muñoz Ruiz; Lorena Vargas	1:15.766 (1)	2:27.153 (1)	3:38.855	49.347	QF
2	Venezuela; Angie González; Maria Briceno; Francismar Pinto	1:19.268 (3)	2:33.997 (2)	3:39.329	47.093	QF
3	Brazil; Janildes Fernandes; Valquiria Pardial; Fernanda Souza	1:18.226 (2)	2:35.123 (3)	3:50.870	46.779	QB
4	Argentina; Talia Ayelen Aguirre; Tania Castro; Valeria Müller	1:22.153 (5)	2:38.057 (4)	3:54.806	45.995	QB
5	Chile; Barbara Iturbe; Olga Elena Muñoz; Katterine Cofre	1:20.486 (4)	2:39.286 (5)	3:59.048	45.179	
6	Ecuador; Maria Eugenia Constante; Daniela Carvajal; Alexandra Rodriguez	1:22.260 (6)	2:41.365 (6)	4:01.751	44.674	

=== Finals ===
Rank	Team	1000m	2000m	Final	Speed
1st place, gold medalist(s)	Colombia; María Luisa Calle; Leidy Natalia Muñoz Ruiz; Lorena Vargas	1:15.215			
2nd place, silver medalist(s)	Venezuela; Angie González; Maria Briceno; Francismar Pinto	1:20.838 (2)		OVL	
3rd place, bronze medalist(s)	Brazil; Janildes Fernandes; Valquiria Pardial; Fernanda Souza	1:16.644 (1)	2:30.861 (1)	3:47.642	47.442
4	Argentina; Talia Ayelen Aguirre; Tania Castro; Valeria Müller	1:19.711 (2)	2:35.285 (2)	3:51.990	-
