= María Briceño =

Venezuelan cyclist

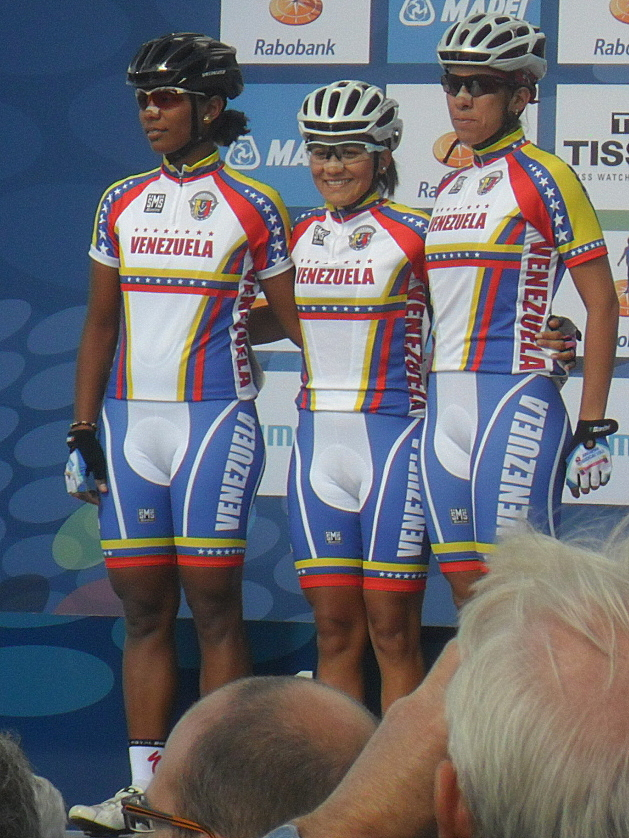
- Briceño at the 2012 UCI Road World Championships

Personal information
- Full name: María Elena Briceño Jiménez
- Born: 25 February 1985 (age 41) Venezuela

Cycling career
- Sport: Cycling
- Discipline: Road
- Role: Rider

Major wins
- National Road Race Championships (2006, 2009)

María Elena Briceño Jiménez (born 25 February 1985) is a Venezuelan road and track cyclist. She participated at the 2008 and 2012 UCI Road World Championships.

== Major results ==
2006
1st Road race, National Road Championships
2007
3rd Road race, National Road Championships
10th Time trial, Pan American Road and Track Championships
2008
2nd Road race, National Road Championships
2009
National Road Championships

1st Road race
2nd Time trial

2010
2nd Team pursuit, South American Games
2011
National Road Championships

3rd Road race
3rd Time trial

2012
National Road Championships

2nd Time trial
3rd Road race

2014
5th Copa Federación Venezolana de Ciclismo
2015
2nd Scratch, Copa Venezuela
3rd Time trial, National Road Championships
9th Copa Federación Venezolana de Ciclismo
2016
Copa Venezuela

3rd Individual pursuit
3rd Points race

2018
National Road Championships

3rd Road race
3rd Time trial

2019
2nd Time trial, National Road Championships
2nd Overall Tour Femenino de Venezuela II
5th Tour Femenino de Venezuela I
2021
3rd Road race, National Road Championships
