= 2014 Clasico FVCiclismo Corre Por la VIDA =

Race details
- Dates: 18 May 2014
- Stages: 1

The 2014 Clasico FVCiclismo Corre Por la VIDA was a one-day women's cycle race held in Venezuela. on 18 May 2014. The race had a UCI rating of 1.2.

== Results ==
	Rider	Team	Time
1	Zuralmy Rivas (VEN)		
2	Gleydimar Tapia (VEN)		
3	Angie González (VEN)		

== See also ==
- 2014 in women's road cycling
