= Juan Morillo =

Juan Morillo is the name of:

- Juan Morillo (athlete) (born 1972), Venezuelan sprinter
- Juan Morillo (baseball, born 1983), Dominican baseball pitcher
- Juan Morillo (baseball, born 1999), Venezuelan baseball pitcher

== See also ==
- Juan Murillo (born 1982), Venezuelan professional road racing cyclist
