= Cycling at the 2011 Pan American Games – Women's omnium =

Cycling – Women's Omnium at the 2011 Pan American Games
- Venue: Pan American Velodrome
- Dates: October 19–20
- Competitors: 10 from 10 nations

Medalists
Gold medal	Angie González	Venezuela
Silver medal	Sofía Arreola	Mexico
Bronze medal	Marlies Mejías	Cuba

The women's omnium competition of the cycling events at the 2011 Pan American Games was held between October 19 and 20 at the Pan American Velodrome in Guadalajara. This event is a new addition to the track cycling program at the Pan American Games.

== Results ==
=== Flying Lap ===
Rank	Name	Nation	Time
1	Marlies Mejías	Cuba	14.404
2	Stephanie Roorda	Canada	14.706
3	Angie González	Venezuela	14.750
4	Sofía Arreola	Mexico	14.967
5	Lorena Vargas	Colombia	15.170
6	Paola Muñoz	Chile	15.266
7	Talia Aguirre	Argentina	15.553
8	Maria Bone	Ecuador	15.566
9	Janildes Silva	Brazil	15.670
10	Marcela Rubiano	Costa Rica	16.135

=== Points Race ===
Rank	Name	Nation	Points
1	Angie González	Venezuela	35
2	Sofía Arreola	Mexico	32
3	Lorena Vargas	Colombia	26
4	Marcela Rubiano	Costa Rica	23
5	Maria Bone	Ecuador	20
6	Janildes Silva	Brazil	15
7	Stephanie Roorda	Canada	13
8	Paola Muñoz	Chile	12
9	Marlies Mejías	Cuba	12
10	Talia Aguirre	Argentina	DNF

=== Elimination Race ===
Rank	Name	Nation
1	Angie González	Venezuela
2	Sofía Arreola	Mexico
3	Paola Muñoz	Chile
4	Lorena Vargas	Colombia
5	Marlies Mejías	Cuba
6	Stephanie Roorda	Canada
7	Talia Aguirre	Argentina
8	Janildes Silva	Brazil
9	Maria Bone	Ecuador
10	Marcela Rubiano	Costa Rica

=== Individual Pursuit ===
Rank	Name	Nation	Time	Notes
1	Stephanie Roorda	Canada	3:37.544	PR
2	Marlies Mejías	Cuba	3:38.126	
3	Angie González	Venezuela	3:39.467	
4	Sofía Arreola	Mexico	3:41.612	
5	Lorena Vargas	Colombia	3:47.282	
6	Paola Muñoz	Chile	3:49.970	
7	Janildes Silva	Brazil	3:50.184	
8	Talia Aguirre	Argentina	3:54.442	
9	Marcela Rubiano	Costa Rica	4:00.411	
10	Maria Bone	Ecuador	4:01.063	

=== Scratch Race ===
Rank	Name	Nation	Laps down
1	Sofía Arreola	Mexico	
2	Talia Aguirre	Argentina	
3	Paola Muñoz	Chile	
4	Angie González	Venezuela	
5	Lorena Vargas	Colombia	
6	Marlies Mejías	Cuba	
7	Stephanie Roorda	Canada	
8	Marcela Rubiano	Costa Rica	
9	Maria Bone	Ecuador	
10	Janildes Silva	Brazil	

=== 500m Time Trial ===
Rank	Name	Nation	Time
1	Marlies Mejías	Cuba	35.211
2	Angie González	Venezuela	35.984
3	Paola Muñoz	Chile	36.901
4	Sofía Arreola	Mexico	37.143
5	Stephanie Roorda	Canada	37.189
6	Lorena Vargas	Colombia	37.888
7	Talia Aguirre	Argentina	38.198
8	Maria Bone	Ecuador	38.937
9	Janildes Silva	Brazil	39.608
10	Marcela Rubiano	Costa Rica	40.294

=== Final standings ===
Rank	Name	Nation	Points
1st place, gold medalist(s)	Angie González	Venezuela	14
2nd place, silver medalist(s)	Sofía Arreola	Mexico	17
3rd place, bronze medalist(s)	Marlies Mejías	Cuba	24
4	Stephanie Roorda	Canada	28
5	Lorena Vargas	Colombia	28
6	Paola Muñoz	Chile	29
7	Janildes Silva	Brazil	49
8	Maria Bone	Ecuador	49
9	Talia Aguirre	Argentina	51
10	Marcela Rubiano	Costa Rica	51
