= Cristopher Mansilla =

Chilean cyclist (1990–2021)

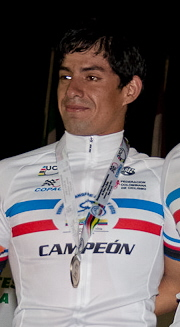

Personal information
- Full name: Cristopher Javier Mansilla Almonacid
- Born: 24 May 1990 Punta Arenas, Chile
- Died: 10 May 2021 (aged 30) Puerto Natales, Chile

Cycling career
- Sport: Cycling
- Disciplines: Track; Road
- Role: Rider

Amateur teams
- 2010: Chacabuco
- 2011: Bianchi R2 Antofagasta
- 2012: Clos de Pirque–Trek
- 2013: USM–Skechers
- 2015: Italomat–Dogo–Orbai

Professional teams
- 2014: PinoRoad
- 2016–2018: Start–Vaxes Cycling Team
Medal record
Representing Chile
Men's track cycling
Pan American Championships
Gold medal – first place	2008 Montevideo	Team sprint
Gold medal – first place	2011 Madison	Madison
Gold medal – first place	2012 Mar del Plata	Madison
Silver medal – second place	2011 Medellin	Scratch
Silver medal – second place	2014 Aguascalientes	Omnium
Bronze medal – third place	2009 Mexico City	Team sprint
Bronze medal – third place	2014 Aguascalientes	Scratch
Bronze medal – third place	2015 Santiago	Scratch
Men's road bicycle racing
Pan American Championships
Bronze medal – third place	2018 San Juan	Road race

Cristopher Javier Mansilla Almonacid (24 May 1990 – 10 May 2021) was a Chilean track and road cyclist.

== Biography ==
He competed in the omnium event at the 2012 UCI Track Cycling World Championships. He was also qualified to start in the madison event but did not start.

Mansilla died at age 30 from COVID-19 in Puerto Natales on 10 May 2021, during the COVID-19 pandemic in Chile.

== Major results ==
2008
1st Team sprint, Pan American Track Championships
2009
3rd Team sprint, Pan American Track Championships
2010
National Under-23 Road Championships

2nd Time trial
3rd Road race

2011
Pan American Track Championships

1st Madison (with Antonio Cabrera)
2nd Scratch

1st Stage 11 Vuelta Ciclista de Chile
2012
1st Madison, Pan American Track Championships (with Antonio Cabrera)
Vuelta Ciclista de Chile

1st Stages 1 (TTT) & 8

2013
Rutas de América

1st Stages 3 & 4

3rd Omnium, Bolivarian Games
2014
Pan American Track Championships

2nd Omnium
3rd Scratch

2015
1st Sprints classification, Vuelta a Venezuela
1st Stage 7b Doble Bragado
Vuelta a Mendoza

1st Stages 3 & 4

3rd Scratch, Pan American Track Championships
2016
1st Stage 2 Doble Bragado
8th Tour of Yancheng Coastal Wetlands
2018
3rd Road race, Pan American Road Championships
