= Roman Catholic Diocese of San Fernando =

Roman Catholic Diocese of San Fernando may refer to the following Latin Catholic dioceses :

- the Roman Catholic Diocese of San Fernando de La Union, in the Philippines
- the Roman Catholic Diocese of San Fernando de Apure, in Venezuela
