= Raúl Saavedra (cyclist) =

Colombian road racing cyclist

Personal information
- Full name: Raúl Saavedra Ochoa
- Born: September 27, 1969 (age 57) San Joaquin, Colombia

Cycling career
- Sport: Cycling
- Discipline: Road
- Role: Rider

Raúl Saavedra Ochoa (born September 27, 1969 in San Joaquin) is a male road racing cyclist from Colombia.

== Career ==
1999
1st in Stage 2 Vuelta a Venezuela, Tucacas (VEN)
2000
2nd in Stage 2 Clasica Coljueces Cundinamarca, Cucuta (COL)
2nd in General Classification Clasica Coljueces Cundinamarca (COL)
2002
1st in General Classification Clásico Virgen de la Consolación de Táriba (VEN)
3rd in Stage 5 Vuelta al Táchira, El Vigía (VEN)
3rd in Stage 11 Vuelta a Venezuela, Valera (VEN)
2005
2nd in Stage 7 Vuelta al Táchira, La Grita (VEN)
2nd in General Classification Vuelta Ciclista Aragua (VEN)
1st in General Classification Vuelta a Santa Cruz de Mora (VEN)
2006
3rd in Stage 6 part a Vuelta a Sucre, Cocoyar (VEN)
2008
2nd in Stage 1 Clasico Pedro Infante, Quibor (VEN)
2009
3rd in Stage 2 Vuelta a los Santanderes, Chinácota (COL)
4th in General Classification Vuelta a los Santanderes (COL)
