= Rubén Rangel =

Venezuelan racing cyclist (born 1977)

Rubén Rangel (born August 12, 1977 in Monagas) is a male professional racing cyclist from Venezuela.

== Career ==
1999
6th in general classification Vuelta a Venezuela (VEN)
2nd in general classification under 23 (1999 Vuelta a Venezuela) (VEN)
2002
1st in Stage 2 Vuelta a Venezuela, Santa Barbara de Taprin (VEN)
