= Our Lady of Mount Carmel Cathedral, Guasdualito =

Our Lady of Mount Carmel Cathedral
- Catedral de Nuestra Señora del Carmen
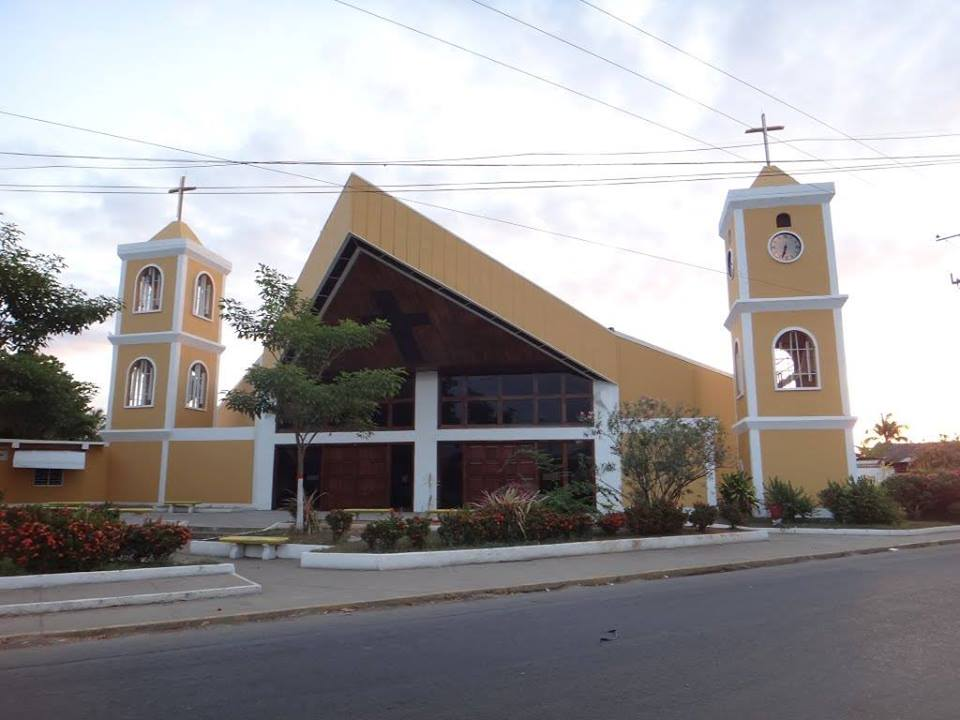
- Guasdualito Cathedral
- Our Lady of Mount Carmel Cathedral
- Location: Guasdualito
- Country: Venezuela
- Denomination: Roman Catholic Church

Our Lady of Mount Carmel Cathedral (Spanish: Catedral de Nuestra Señora del Carmen), also Guasdualito Cathedral, is a religious building belonging to the Catholic Church in the city of Guasdualito, Venezuela.

== Location ==
The cathedral is located between Bolívar and Sucre Streets and Miranda Avenue. Guasdualito is near the border with Colombia and Barinas state, in the municipality of Paez, in the Alto Apure Metropolitan district in western Apure state, in the plains region of Venezuela.

== History ==
The building began as a parish church ("Church of Our Lady of Mount Carmel"). The bells were donated in 1940 while the cathedral clock was donated by the Italian Vicenzo Guarino in 1954. In February 1948 the cathedral was affected by a fire and had to be repaired. In 1988 the building underwent significant changes in its structure

The church acquired cathedral status in 2015 with the separation of the jurisdiction of the Diocese of San Fernando de Apure (Dioecesis Sancti Ferdinandi Apurensis). Now a Roman or Latin rite cathedral, it functions as the headquarters of the Roman Catholic Diocese of Guasdualito which is a suffragan of the Metropolitan Archdiocese of Mérida and was created by decision of Pope Francis on December 3, 2015.

== See also ==
- List of cathedrals in Venezuela
- Our Lady of Mount Carmel
- Roman Catholicism in Venezuela
