= Roman Catholic Diocese of Guasdualito =

Roman Catholic diocese in Venezuela

Diocese of Guasdualito

Location
- Country: Venezuela
- Ecclesiastical province: Caracas

Statistics
- Area: 2,750 km^{2} (1,060 sq mi)
- Population: Total; Catholics: (as of 2021); 314,460; 281,340 (89.5%)

Information
- Denomination: Catholic Church
- Rite: Latin Rite
- Established: 3 December 2015 (10 years ago)

Current leadership
- Pope: Leo XIV
- Bishop-Elect: José Magdaleno Álvarez Briceño

The Roman Catholic Diocese of Guasdualito is a young Latin Catholic suffragan diocese of the Metropolitan Roman Catholic Archdiocese of Mérida in Venezuela in southern Venezuela's land-locked Apure State.

Its cathedral episcopal see is the Marian Our Lady of Mount Carmel Cathedral (Catedral Nuestra Señora del Carmen) dedicated to the Virgin of Mercy, in Guasdualito, Apure.

== History ==
The bishopric was established on 3 December 2015 by Pope Francis as Diocese of Guasdualito, on territories split off from the dioceses of Barinas and San Fernando de Apure.

== Episcopal ordinaries ==
- Bishop Pablo Modesto González Pérez, Salesians (S.D.B.) (2015.12.03 – 2025.01.09, Appointed Bishop of La Guaira)
- Bishop-Elect José Magdaleno Álvarez Briceño, (2026.04.25 – Present)

== See also ==
- Roman Catholicism in Venezuela
