= List of women's road bicycle races =

This is a list of women's road cycling races. The list only includes the most important women's road races, and no track, mountain or cyclo-cross races.

== Championships ==
- UCI Road World Championships: road race, time trial, team time trial
- African Cycling Championships: road race, time trial
- Asian Cycling Championships: road race, time trial
- European Road Championships (U23): road race, time trial
- Oceanian Cycling Championships: road race, time trial
- Pan American Championships: road race, time trial
- National Championships: road race, time trial

== UCI Women's WorldTour ==
This series replaced the UCI Women's Road World Cup in 2016. Unlike its predecessor, it also features stage races.

=== Current WorldTour races ===
Race	Cat.
(Italy) Strade Bianche	1.WWT
(Netherlands) Ronde van Drenthe	1.WWT
(Italy) Trofeo Alfredo Binda-Comune di Cittiglio	1.WWT
(Belgium) Three Days of Bruges–De Panne	1.WWT
(Belgium) Gent–Wevelgem	1.WWT
(Belgium) Tour of Flanders	1.WWT
(Netherlands) Amstel Gold Race	1.WWT
(Belgium) La Flèche Wallonne	1.WWT
(Belgium) Liège–Bastogne–Liège	1.WWT
(China) Tour of Chongming Island	2.WWT
(United States) Tour of California	2.WWT
(Spain) Emakumeen Euskal Bira	2.WWT
(United Kingdom) The Women's Tour	2.WWT
(Italy) Giro Donne	2.WWT
La Course by Le Tour de France	1.WWT
(United Kingdom) RideLondon	1.WWT
(Sweden) Open de Suède Vårgårda TTT	1.WWT
(Sweden) Open de Suède Vårgårda	1.WWT
Ladies Tour of Norway	2.WWT
(France) GP de Plouay	1.WWT
(Netherlands) Holland Ladies Tour	2.WWT
(Spain) Madrid Challenge by la Vuelta	1.WWT
(China) Tour of Guangxi	2.WWT

== One-day races (below WorldTour) ==
=== Current races ===
Race	Cat.
(Argentina) Gran Prix San Luis Femenino	1.2
(Thailand) Udon Thani's 123rd Anniversary International Cycling	1.2
(Australia) Cadel Evans Great Ocean Road Race	1.2
(Belgium) Omloop Het Nieuwsblad	1.1
(Belgium) Omloop van het Hageland	1.1
(Belgium) Le Samyn des Dames	1.2
(Israel) Arad Dimona Arad	1.2
(Israel) Massada Arad	1.2
(Israel) Dead Sea–Scorpion Pass	1.2
(Netherlands) Acht van Westerveld	1.2
(Belgium) Pajot Hills Classic	1.2
(Belgium) Grand Prix de Dottignies	1.2
(Spain) Durango-Durango Emakumeen Saria	1.2
(Netherlands) Salverda Omloop van de IJsseldelta	1.2
(Netherlands) Ronde van Gelderland	1.2
(Netherlands) EPZ Omloop van Borsele	1.1
(Belgium) Dwars door de Westhoek	1.1
(Italy) Trofeo Lazzaretti	1.2
(United Kingdom) Women's Tour de Yorkshire	1.2
(Netherlands) Rabobank Marianne Vos Classic	1.2
(Belgium) Trofee Maarten Wynants	1.2
(Venezuela) Copa Federación Venezolana de Ciclismo	1.2
(Venezuela) Clasico FVCiclismo Corre Por la VIDA	1.2
Gran Premio de Venezuela	1.2
Grand Prix de Venezuela	1.2
(Switzerland) GP Cham–Hagendorn	1.2
(United Kingdom) Velothon Wales	1.2
(Netherlands) Boels Rental Hills Classic	1.1
(France) La Classique Morbihan	1.1
(France) Grand Prix de Plumelec-Morbihan Dames	1.1
(Ukraine) Horizon Park Women Challenge	1.2
(Ukraine) VR Women (ITT)	1.2
(Belgium) Gooik–Geraardsbergen–Gooik	1.2
(United States) Winston-Salem Cycling Classic	1.2
(Canada) Grand Prix cycliste de Gatineau	1.1
(Canada) Chrono Gatineau (ITT)	1.1
(Belgium) Heistse Pijl – Heist op den Berg	1.1
(Belgium) Zuidkempense Ladies Classic	1.2
(Belgium) Diamond Tour	1.1
(Canada) White Spot / Delta Road Race	1.2
(France) Chrono Champenois (ITT)	1.2
(Italy) Giro dell'Emilia Internazionale Donne Elite	1.1
(Italy) Gran Premio Bruno Beghelli Internazionale Donne Elite	1.1

==== Non-UCI races ====
Netherlands

- Acht van Chaam, professional criterium
- Draai van de Kaai, professional criterium
- Gouden Pijl, professional criterium
- Grand Prix Leende, part of the Dutch National Time Trial competition (Dutch: KNWU tijdritcompetitie)
- Omloop van Borsele Time Trial, part of the Dutch National Time Trial competition (Dutch: KNWU tijdritcompetitie)
- Parel van de Veluwe
- Profronde van Almelo, professional criterium
- Profronde van Oostvoorne, professional criterium
- Profronde van Stiphout, professional criterium
- Profronde van Tiel, professional criterium

=== Defunct races ===
(year is last edition)

- Women's Challenge USA (2002)
- Tour of Chongming Island Time Trial China (2009)

== Stage races (below WorldTour) ==
=== Current races ===
Race	Cat.
(Argentina) Tour Femenino de San Luis	2.1
(Thailand) Tour of Udon	2.2
(Australia) Santos Women's Tour	2.2
Ladies Tour of Qatar	2.1
(Mexico) Vuelta Femenil Internacional	2.2
(Netherlands) Energiewacht Tour	2.2
(Thailand) The Princess Maha Chackri Sirindhon's Cup	2.2
(Spain) Emakumeen Euskal Bira	2.1
(United States) Joe Martin Stage Race	2.2
(Czech Republic) Gracia–Orlová	2.2
(Luxembourg) Festival Luxembourgeois du cyclisme féminin Elsy Jacobs	2.1
(United States) Tour of the Gila	2.2
(China) Tour of Zhoushan Island	2.2
(Finland) NEA	2.2
Vuelta Internacional Femenina a Costa Rica	2.2
(France) Tour d'Occitanie	2.2
(Germany) Albstadt-Frauen-Etappenrennen	2.1
(Germany) Auensteiner-Radsporttage	2.2
(Italy) Giro del Trentino Alto Adige-Südtirol	2.1
(Czech Republic) Tour de Feminin-O cenu Českého Švýcarska	2.2
(Netherlands) BeNe Ladies Tour	2.2
(Germany) Internationale Thüringen Rundfahrt der Frauen	2.1
(Poland) Tour de Pologne Féminin	2.2
(United States) Cascade Cycling Classic	2.2
La Route de France	2.1
Ladies Tour of Norway	2.2
(France) Trophée d'Or Féminin	2.2
(Netherlands) Boels Rental Ladies Tour	2.1
Lotto Belisol Belgium Tour	2.1
(Italy) Premondiale Giro Toscana Int. Femminile – Memorial Michela Fanini	2.2

=== Defunct races ===
(year is last edition)

- Tour du Grand Montréal Canada (2009)
- La Grande Boucle Féminine France (2009)
- Tour de Snowy Australia (2002)
- Tour de l'Aude Cycliste Féminin (2010)
- RaboSter Zeeuwsche Eilanden (Cat. 2.2) (2012)

== See also ==
- List of men's road bicycle races
