= Cycling at the 2010 South American Games – Women's team sprint =

The Women's Team Sprint event at the 2010 South American Games was held on March 19.

== Medalists ==
Gold	Silver	Bronze
Diana García; Milena Salcedo; Colombia	Maira Barbosa; Sumaia Ribeiro; Brazil	Angie González; Marines Prada; Venezuela

== Results ==
=== Qualification ===
Rank	Team	Lap 1	Final	Speed	Q
1	Colombia; Diana García; Milena Salcedo	20.460 (1)	35.535	50.654	QF
2	Brazil; Maira Barbosa; Sumaia Ribeiro	21.700 (3)	36.951	48.713	QF
3	Venezuela; Angie González; Marines Prada	21.163 (2)	37.135	48.471	QB
4	Chile; Maria Paz Bravo; Irene Cortes	22.096 (5)	38.453	46.810	QB
5	Argentina; Daiana Almada; Caterine Priviley	21.981 (4)	38.849	46.333	

=== Finals ===
Rank	Team	Lap 1	Final	Speed
1st place, gold medalist(s)	Colombia; Diana García; Milena Salcedo	20.841 (1)	35.893	50.149
2nd place, silver medalist(s)	Brazil; Maira Barbosa; Sumaia Ribeiro	21.198 (2)	37.083	48.083
3rd place, bronze medalist(s)	Venezuela; Angie González; Marines Prada	21.257 (1)	37.382	48.151
4	Chile; Maria Paz Bravo; Irene Cortes	22.290 (2)	38.436	46.831
