= Domingo González (cyclist) =

Mexican cyclist (born 1970)

Personal information
- Born: 30 January 1970 (age 56)

Cycling career
- Sport: Cycling
Medal record
Men's road bicycle racing
Representing Mexico
Pan American Championships
Bronze medal – third place	2004 Cojedes	Time trial

Domingo González (born 30 January 1970) is a Mexican cyclist. He competed in the men's individual road race at the 1996 Summer Olympics.
