= Danielys García =

Venezuelan cyclist (born 1986)

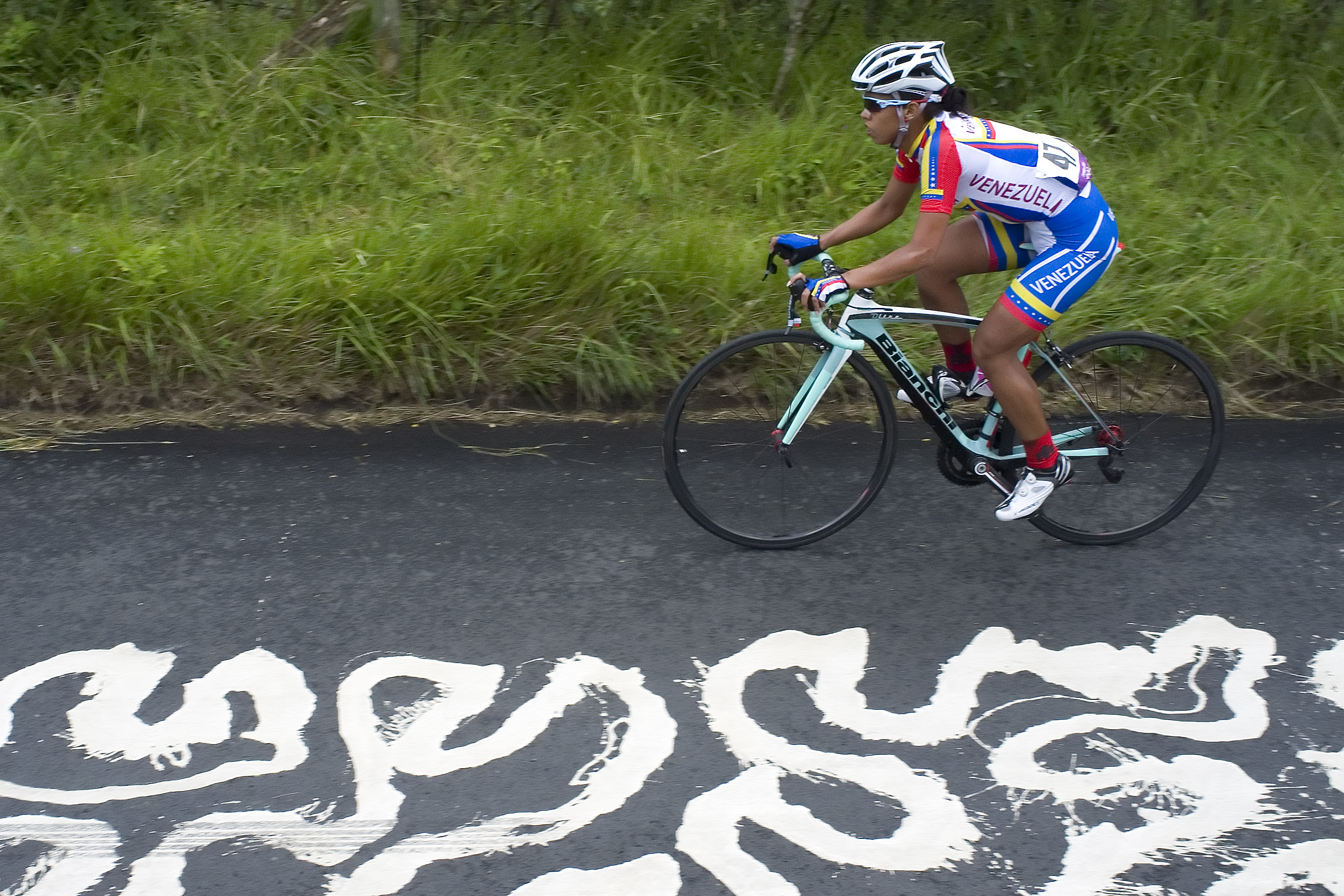
- Garcia climbing Box Hill while competing in the road race at the 2012 Olympics

Personal information
- Full name: Danielys del Valle García Buitriag
- Born: August 20, 1986 (age 40) Valera, Venezuela

Cycling career
- Sport: Cycling
- Disciplines: Road and track
- Role: Rider

Professional team
- 2007: USC Chirio Forno d'Asolo
Medal record
Representing Venezuela
Women's road cycling
Pan American Games
Bronze medal – third place	2007 Rio de Janeiro	Road race
Pan American Championships
Bronze medal – third place	2004 Cojedes	Road race
Central American and Caribbean Games
Gold medal – first place	2010 Mayagüez	Time trial
Bronze medal – third place	2006 Cartagena	Road race
Women's track cycling
Pan American Games
Silver medal – second place	2007 Rio de Janeiro	Individual pursuit
Pan American Championships
Silver medal – second place	2011 Medellin	Team pursuit
Silver medal – second place	2012 Mar del Plata	Points race
Silver medal – second place	2012 Mar del Plata	Team pursuit
Bronze medal – third place	2007 Valencia	Individual pursuit
Bronze medal – third place	2010 Aguascalientes	Points race
Bronze medal – third place	2013 Mexico City	Points race
Bronze medal – third place	2013 Mexico City	Team pursuit
Central American and Caribbean Games
Gold medal – first place	2010 Mayagüez	Individual pursuit
Gold medal – first place	2010 Mayagüez	Points race

Danielys Del Valle García Buitrago (born August 20, 1986 in Valera, Trujillo) is a female track and road cyclist from Venezuela.

== Career ==
She won a bronze medal for her native country at the 2007 Pan American Games in Rio de Janeiro, Brazil. She competed in the road race at the 2008 Olympics, placing 54th, and again in the road race at the 2012 Olympics, in which she did not finish.

2006
1st in Venezuelan National Championships, Road, Elite, Individual Time Trial, San Carlos, Cojedes (VEN)
in Central American and Caribbean Games, Road, Individual Time Trial, Cartagena (COL)
2007
1st in Venezuelan National Championships, Road, Elite, Venezuela (VEN)
in Pan American Championships, Track, Pursuit, Valencia (VEN)
(bronze) in Pan American Games, Road Race, Rio de Janeiro (BRA)
2008
1st in Venezuelan National Championships, Road, Elite, Individual Time Trial, Mérida (VEN)
1st in Venezuelan National Championships, Road, Elite, Santa Cruz de Mora (VEN)
2nd in Copa Federacion Venezolana de Ciclismo (VEN)
2009
1st in Venezuelan National Championships, Road, Elite, Individual Time Trial, Quibor (VEN)
2nd Venezuelan National Championships, Track, Points Race
2nd Venezuelan National Championships, Track, Individual Pursuit
2010
in Central American and Caribbean Games, Road, Individual Time Trial, Mayagüez (PUR)
in Central American and Caribbean Games, Track, Individual Pursuit, Mayagüez (PUR)
in Central American and Caribbean Games, Track, Points Race, Mayagüez (PUR)
in Pan American Championships, Track, Points race, Aguascalientes (MEX)
1st in Venezuelan National Championships, Road, Elite, Individual Time Trial, Trujillo (VEN)
1st in Venezuelan National Championships, Road, Elite, Road Race, Trujillo (VEN)
2011
1st in Venezuelan National Championships, Road, Elite, Individual Time Trial, Anzoátegui (VEN)
2nd in Venezuelan National Championships, Track, Scratch Race
2nd in Venezuelan National Championships, Track, Points Race
3rd in Venezuelan National Championships, Track, Individual Pursuit
2nd in Clásico Aniversario Federacion Ciclista de Venezuela, Araure (VEN)
2nd in Clasico Corre Por La Vida, Guanare (VEN)
2012
1st in Venezuelan National Championships, Road, Elite, Individual Time Trial, Falcón (VEN)
2nd in Venezuelan National Championships, Road, Elite, Road Race, Falcón (VEN)
in Pan American Championships, Track, Points Race, Mar del Plata (ARG)
3rd in Clasicó Fundadeporte, Valencia (VEN)
2013
1st in Venezuelan National Championships, Road, Elite, Individual Time Trial, Santa Cruz de Mora (VEN)
1st in Venezuelan National Championships, Road, Elite, Road Race, Santa Cruz de Mora (VEN)
2nd in Venezuelan National Championships, Track, Points Race
1st in Copa Cobernador de Carabobo, Track, Points Race
2nd in Copa Cobernador de Carabobo, Track, Scratch
Copa Cuba de Pista

2nd Points Race
2nd Team Pursuit (with Zuralmy Rivas, Yennifer Cesar and Fanny Alvarez)

in Pan American Championships, Track, Points Race, Mexico City (MEX)
in Pan American Championships, Track, Team Pursuit, Mexico City (MEX)(with Yennifer Cesar and Angie González)
2016
Copa Venezuela

1st Scratch Race
2nd Points Race
