= Veronique Labonte =

Canadian cyclist

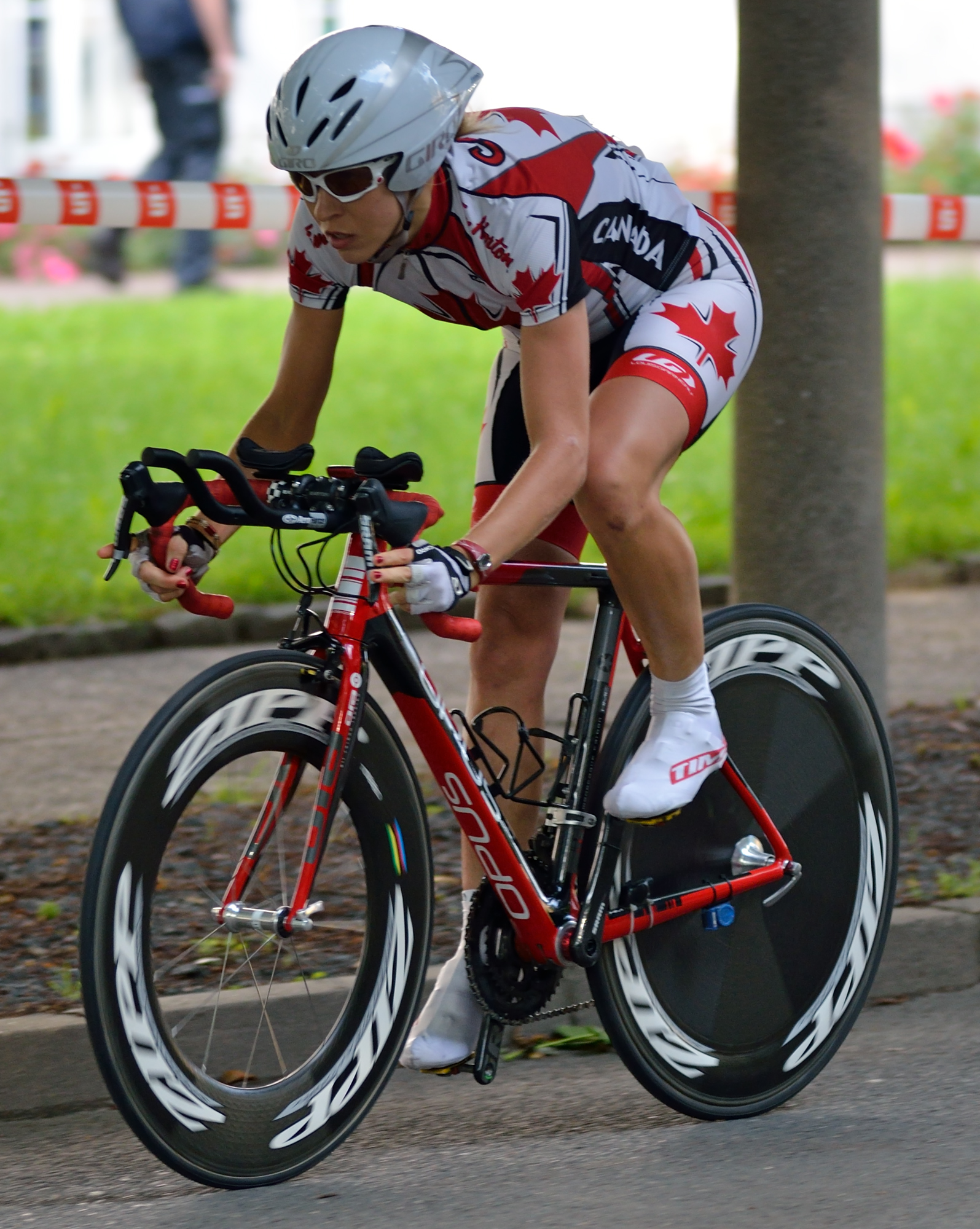
- Labonte in 2012

Personal information
- Born: 15 September 1980 (age 46) Canada

Cycling career
- Sport: Cycling
- Discipline: Road cycling

Professional team
- 2011: Juvederm-Specialized

Veronique Labonte (born 15 September 1980) is a road cyclist from Canada. She participated at the 2012 UCI Road World Championships.
