= Wilmer Bravo =

Venezuelan cyclist

Personal information
- Full name: Wilmer Bravo Isaga
- Born: 22 December 1981 (age 44)

Cycling career
- Sport: Cycling
- Current team: Grupo JHS
- Discipline: Road
- Role: Rider

Amateur teams
- 2013: Gobernación de Barinas
- 2014–2015: Gobernación de Mérida
- 2016–: Grupo JHS

Wilmer Bravo Isaga (born 22 December 1981) is a Venezuelan cyclist.

== Palmares ==
2007
1st Stage 4 Vuelta a Venezuela
2010
1st Stage 3 Vuelta a Cuba
2011
1st Stage 6 Vuelta a Venezuela
2017
1st Stage 4 Vuelta al Táchira
