= Petra Zrimšek =

Slovenian road cyclist

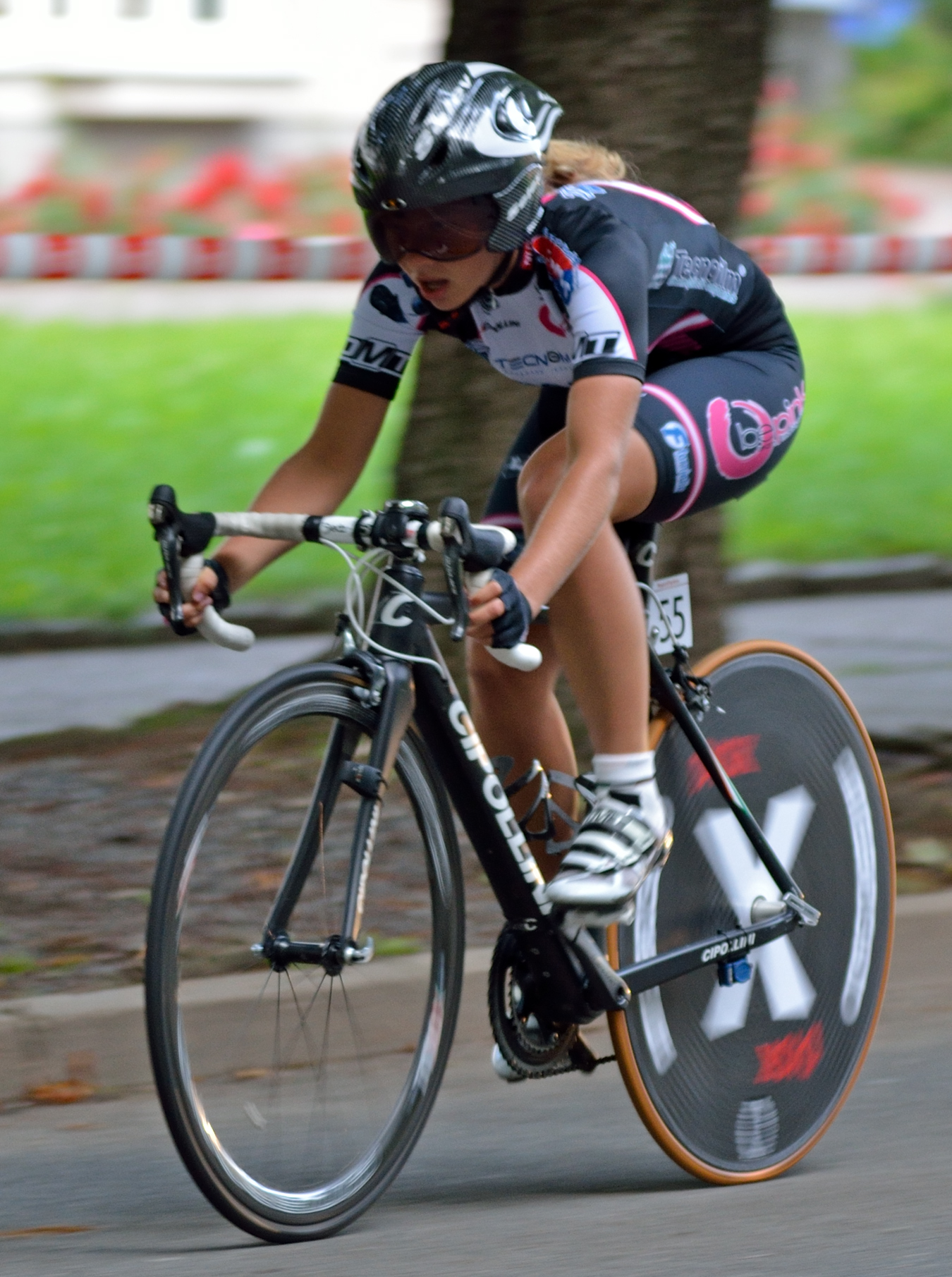
- Zrimšek in 2012

Personal information
- Born: 19 May 1988 (age 38) Socialist Republic of Slovenia, SFR Yugoslavia

Cycling career
- Sport: Cycling
- Discipline: Road cycling

Petra Zrimšek (born 19 May 1988) is a road cyclist from Slovenia. She participated at the 2012 UCI Road World Championships.
