= Anthony Brea =

Venezuelan racing cyclist

Personal information
- Full name: Anthony José Brea Salazar
- Born: 3 February 1983 (age 43) Carabobo, Valencia, Venezuela

Cycling career
- Sport: Cycling
- Discipline: Road
- Role: Rider

Professional team
- 2007: Diquigiovanni–Selle Italia

Anthony José Brea Salazar (born February 3, 1983) is a Venezuelan professional racing cyclist.

== Major results ==
2006
1st Stage 13 Vuelta a Venezuela
1st Points classification Clásico Ciclístico Banfoandes
2007
1st Stages 2, 9 & 13 Vuelta a Cuba
1st Stage 10 Vuelta Ciclista Lider al Sur
1st Stage 3 Volta do Rio de Janeiro
2nd Road race, National Road Championships
2008
1st Stage 2 Vuelta al Táchira
3rd Clasico Ciudad de Caracas
