= Juan Murillo =

Venezuelan racing cyclist (born 1982)

Personal information
- Full name: Juan Engelberth Murillo Ortíz
- Born: 1 August 1982 (age 44)

Cycling career
- Sport: Cycling
- Current team: Retired
- Discipline: Road
- Role: Rider

Amateur teams
- 2002: Kino Táchira
- 2002: Kopstal–Sidi–Colnago
- 2003–2009: Lotería del Táchira
- 2010–2012: Gobernación del Zulia
- 2013: Kino Táchira
- 2014–2017: Lotería del Táchira
- 2014–2015: Resonex Gwada Bikers 118 (guest)

Juan Engelberth Murillo Ortíz (born August 1, 1982) is a Venezuelan former road racing cyclist.

== Doping ==
On 1 August 2017 Murillo tested positive for EPO-CERA during the Tour de Guadeloupe and was later banned for four years and fined €10,000.

== Major results ==
2004
1st Stage 2 Doble Sucre Potosí GP Cemento Fancesa
3rd Road race, Pan American Under-23 Road Championships
2006
1st Stage 12 Vuelta al Táchira
1st Stage 2 Vuelta al Estado Yaracuy
1st Stage 2 Vuelta Ciclista Aragua
1st Stage 2 Vuelta a Venezuela
1st Stage 4 Clásico Ciclístico Banfoandes
2007
1st Stage 3 Vuelta al Táchira
2nd Overall Vuelta a Bramon

1st Stage 3

3rd Overall Vuelta al Oriente
2008
8th Overall Vuelta al Táchira
9th Overall Vuelta a Venezuela
2009
4th Overall Vuelta al Táchira

1st Stage 4

2011
2nd Overall Vuelta a Venezuela
4th Overall Vuelta al Táchira
2012
1st Stage 10 Vuelta al Táchira
2013
2nd Road race, National Road Championships
2nd Overall Vuelta a Venezuela

1st Stage 7

6th Overall Vuelta al Táchira

1st Stage 3

2014
2nd Overall Vuelta al Táchira

1st Stages 3 & 5

3rd Overall Tour de Guadeloupe

1st Points classification
1st Stages 1 & 2b (ITT)

5th Overall Vuelta a Venezuela
2015
1st Road race, National Road Championships
2nd Overall Vuelta al Táchira

1st Points classification
1st Stage 8

4th Overall Tour de Guadeloupe
2017
2nd Overall Tour de Guadeloupe

1st Stages 2b (ITT) & 4
