= Tour Femenino de Venezuela =

Bicycle race in Venezuela

Race details
- Date: May
- Region: Venezuela
- Discipline: Road
- Competition: UCI 2.2 (2019–)
- Type: Stage race
- Web site: federacionvenezolanadeciclismo.com.ve

History
- First edition: 2019
- Editions: 1 (as of 2019)
- First winner: Lilibeth Chacon (VEN)
- Most wins: No repeat winners
- Most recent: Lilibeth Chacon (VEN)

The Tour Femenino de Venezuela is an annual professional road bicycle race for women in Venezuela.

== Winners ==
Year	Country	Rider	Team
2019	Venezuela	Lilibeth Chacon	
