= Guasdualito =

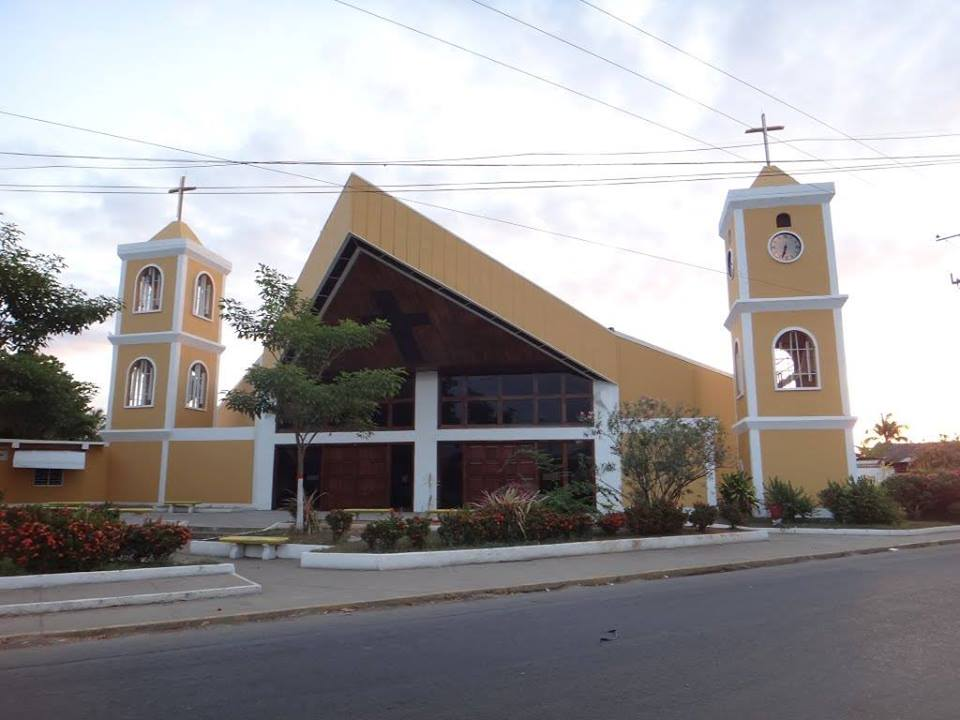

- Location within Apure Location within Venezuela
- Coordinates: 07°14′48″N 70°43′45″W
- Country: Venezuela
- State: Apure
- Municipality: Páez Municipality
- Founded: 1770/1
- Elevation: 125 m (410 ft)

Population
  - Total: 105,000
  - Demonym: Guasdualiteño/a
- Time zone: UTC−4 (VET)
- Postal code: 5063
- Area code: 0278
- Climate: Aw

Guasdualito is a city and episcopal see in the landlocked Apure State, in southern Venezuela.

== Description ==
The city is the capital of Páez Municipality, in the Distrito Especial Alto Apure.

It has an important location on the border between Venezuela and the city of Arauca in Colombia for commerce, as well as being the main petroleum center in the region.

It has a population of approximately 100,000 inhabitants per 2014.

== Climate ==
Guasdualito has a tropical savanna climate (Köppen: Aw), characterized by consistently hot temperatures and distinct wet and dry seasons. Guasdualito experiences a wet season from April to November, with the wettest months being May, June, and July. The dry season lasts from December to March. February to April are the hottest months, with average high temperatures around 34 °C (93 °F), and the coolest period is from June to August, with average highs around 30 °C (86 °F).

Climate data for Guasdualito (1991–2020)
Month	Jan	Feb	Mar	Apr	May	Jun	Jul	Aug	Sep	Oct	Nov	Dec	Year
Record high °C (°F)	36.9 (98.4)	37.8 (100.0)	39.6 (103.3)	39.0 (102.2)	38.4 (101.1)	39.1 (102.4)	36.4 (97.5)	36.1 (97.0)	35.6 (96.1)	38.3 (100.9)	38.3 (100.9)	38.5 (101.3)	39.6 (103.3)
Mean daily maximum °C (°F)	33.3 (91.9)	34.5 (94.1)	34.8 (94.6)	33.4 (92.1)	31.8 (89.2)	30.4 (86.7)	30.2 (86.4)	30.8 (87.4)	31.5 (88.7)	31.8 (89.2)	31.6 (88.9)	32.2 (90.0)	32.2 (90.0)
Daily mean °C (°F)	25.9 (78.6)	26.9 (80.4)	27.6 (81.7)	27.0 (80.6)	26.2 (79.2)	25.5 (77.9)	25.2 (77.4)	25.5 (77.9)	25.9 (78.6)	26.1 (79.0)	26.0 (78.8)	25.9 (78.6)	26.1 (79.0)
Mean daily minimum °C (°F)	21.4 (70.5)	22.3 (72.1)	23.0 (73.4)	23.3 (73.9)	23.1 (73.6)	22.6 (72.7)	22.4 (72.3)	22.5 (72.5)	22.7 (72.9)	22.9 (73.2)	22.8 (73.0)	22.1 (71.8)	22.6 (72.7)
Record low °C (°F)	16.8 (62.2)	17.2 (63.0)	18.6 (65.5)	18.8 (65.8)	20.5 (68.9)	20.5 (68.9)	20.1 (68.2)	20.3 (68.5)	18.2 (64.8)	18.5 (65.3)	18.2 (64.8)	18.0 (64.4)	16.8 (62.2)
Average precipitation mm (inches)	14.7 (0.58)	25.6 (1.01)	58.4 (2.30)	160.1 (6.30)	270.1 (10.63)	304.1 (11.97)	289.8 (11.41)	210.1 (8.27)	177.0 (6.97)	161.4 (6.35)	110.0 (4.33)	29.2 (1.15)	1,810.5 (71.28)
Average precipitation days (≥ 1.0 mm)	1.1	2.1	4.0	10.4	15.1	18.3	17.8	15.1	11.8	11.3	7.0	3.3	117.3
Source: NOAA

== Religion ==
The Our Lady of Mount Carmel Cathedral (Catedral Nuestra Señora del Carmen) is dedicated to the Virgin of Mercy and is the cathedral episcopal see of the Roman Catholic Diocese of Guasdualito since December 2015.

== See also ==
- List of cities and towns in Venezuela
