= Lorena Vargas =

Colombian cyclist (born 1986)

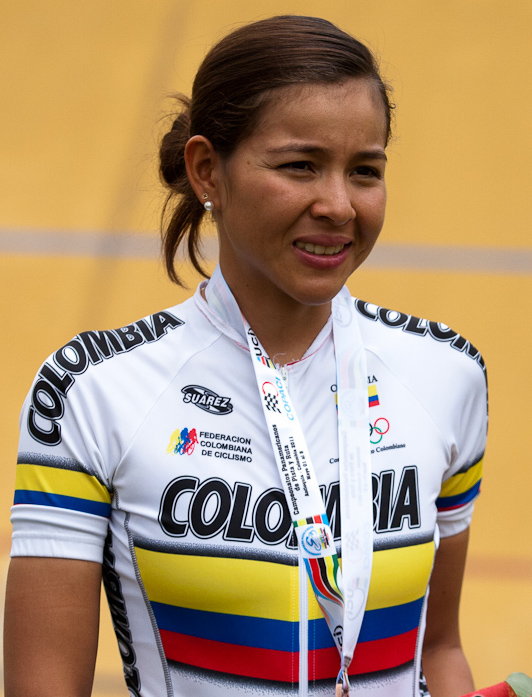
- Vargas at the 2011 Pan American Cycling Championships

Personal information
- Full name: Lorena María Vargas Villamil
- Born: 26 August 1986 (age 40)

Cycling career
- Sport: Cycling
- Disciplines: Track; Road
- Role: Rider

Professional teams
- 2013: Pasta Zara–Cogeas
- 2014: Forno d'Asolo–Astute
Medal record
Representing Colombia
Women's track cycling
Pan American Games
Bronze medal – third place	2011 Guadalajara	Team pursuit
Pan American Championships
Silver medal – second place	2009 Mexico City	Team pursuit
Silver medal – second place	2010 Aguascalientes	Points race
Silver medal – second place	2011 Medellín	Scratch
Bronze medal – third place	2010 Aguascalientes	Team pursuit
Bronze medal – third place	2011 Medellín	Team pursuit
South American Games
Gold medal – first place	2010 Medellín	Points race
Gold medal – first place	2010 Medellín	Scratch
Gold medal – first place	2010 Medellín	Team pursuit
Central American and Caribbean Games
Bronze medal – third place	2014 Veracruz	Team pursuit

Lorena María Vargas Villamil (born 26 August 1986) is a Colombian racing cyclist. She competed in the 2013 UCI women's road race in Florence. She won the Colombian National Road Race Championships in 2012 and 2013.

== Major results ==
=== Track ===
2008
2nd Individual pursuit, National Track Championships
2009
National Track Championships

1st Individual pursuit
1st Omnium
1st Points race

2nd Team pursuit, Pan American Track Championships
2010
South American Games

1st Points race
1st Scratch
1st Team pursuit

Pan American Track Championships

2nd Points race
3rd Team pursuit

2011
Pan American Track Championships

2nd Scratch
3rd Team pursuit

3rd Team pursuit, Pan American Games
National Track Championships

3rd Individual pursuit
3rd Omnium

2012
3rd Points race, National Track Championships
2014
3rd Team pursuit, Central American and Caribbean Games (with Jessica Parra, Valentina Paniagua and Milena Salcedo)
3rd Individual pursuit, National Track Championships
2015
National Track Championships

2nd Points race
3rd Omnium
3rd Scratch

2017
3rd Individual pursuit, National Track Championships
2018
2nd Madison, National Track Championships

=== Road ===
2008
National Road Championships

2nd Road race
2nd Time trial

2009
National Road Championships

2nd Road race
2nd Time trial

2011
2nd Time trial, National Road Championships
2012
1st Road race, National Road Championships
2013
National Road Championships

1st Road race
3rd Time trial

2nd Grand Prix de Oriente
3rd Overall Vuelta Internacional Femenina a Costa Rica
6th Grand Prix GSB
6th Grand Prix el Salvador
2015
8th Gran Prix San Luis Femenino
2017
3rd Road race, National Road Championships
2018
10th Overall Vuelta Femenina a Guatemala

1st Stage 3
