= Hussein Monsalve =

Venezuelan cyclist

Personal information
- Born: 3 March 1969 (age 57)

Cycling career
- Sport: Cycling

Hussein "Yussen" José Monsalve Madrid (born 3 March 1969) is a retired male road cyclist from Venezuela. He represented his native country at the 1999 Pan American Games in Winnipeg, Manitoba, Canada, and twice at the Summer Olympics: 1992 and 1996.

== Career ==
1997
1st in Stage 4 part a Vuelta al Táchira (VEN)
1998
1st in Stage 3 Vuelta al Táchira, Tova (VEN)
1st in Stage 10 Vuelta a Venezuela (VEN)
2nd in General Classification Vuelta a Venezuela (VEN)
2001
5th in General Classification Vuelta a Venezuela (VEN)
2002

46th in General Classification Olympic Games, Barcelona 1992
