= Clasico FVCiclismo Corre Por la VIDA =

Venezuelan one-day road cycling race

Race details
- Date: May
- Region: Venezuela
- Discipline: Road

History (men)
- First edition: 2004
- Editions: 9
- Final edition: 2015
- First winner: Gil Cordovés (CUB)
- Most wins: Gil Cordovés (CUB); José Aguilar (VEN); Ángel Pulgar (VEN); (2 wins)
- Final winner: Miguel Ubeto (VEN)

History (women)
- First edition: 2008
- Editions: 6
- Final edition: 2016
- First winner: Angie González (VEN)
- Most wins: Angie González (VEN) (2 wins)
- Final winner: Danielys García (VEN)

The Clasico FVCiclismo Corre Por la VIDA was an elite men's and women's professional one-day road bicycle race held in Venezuela, rated by the UCI as a 1.2 race.

== Past winners ==
=== Men's race ===
| Year | Country | Rider | Team |
|---|---|---|---|
| 2004 | Cuba | Gil Cordovés | |
| 2005 | No race | | |
| 2006 | Cuba | Gil Cordovés | |
| 2007 | Venezuela | José Aguilar | |
| 2008 | Venezuela | José Aguilar | |
| 2009 | Venezuela | Ángel Pulgar | |
| 2010 | Venezuela | Artur García | |
| 2011 | Venezuela | Ángel Pulgar | |
| 2012 | Venezuela | Frederick Segura | |
| 2013– 2014 | No race | | |
| 2015 | Venezuela | Miguel Ubeto | Gobierno Bolivariano de Nueva Esparta |

=== Women's race ===
| Year | Country | Rider | Team |
|---|---|---|---|
| 2008 | Venezuela | Angie González | |
| 2009– 2010 | No race | | |
| 2011 | Venezuela | Angie González | |
| 2012 | Mexico | Mayra Rocha | |
| 2013 | No race | | |
| 2014 | Venezuela | Zuralmy Rivas | |
| 2015 | Chile | Paola Muñoz | |
| 2016 | Venezuela | Danielys García | |
