= César Suárez (cyclist) =

Venezuelan cyclist (born 1984)

Personal information
- Born: October 16, 1984 (age 41)

Cycling career
- Sport: Cycling
- Discipline: Road racing
- Role: Rider

César Suárez (born October 16, 1984) is a Venezuelan professional racing cyclist.

== Career highlights ==
2005
3rd in General Classification Vuelta a Sucre (VEN)

2008
1st in Stage 9 Vuelta al Tachira, San Cristóbal (VEN)

== See also ==
- Glossary of cycling
- History of cycling
- List of cyclists
- Outline of cycling
