= Frederick Segura =

Venezuelan cyclist

Medal record
Men's track cycling
Representing Venezuela
Central American and Caribbean Games
Silver medal – second place	2006 Cartagena	Team Pursuit

Frederick J. Segura Chirinos (born January 16, 1979) is a male professional track and road cyclist from Venezuela.

== Career ==
2002
1st in Stage 6 Vuelta a Venezuela, Valle de la Pascua criterium (VEN)
2006
1st in Prologue Vuelta a la Independencia Nacional, Santo Domingo (DOM)
1st in Stage 5 Vuelta al Oriente (VEN)
1st in Stage 12 Vuelta a Venezuela, Cumaná (VEN)
2007
1st in Stage 2 Vuelta al Estado Yaracuy, Nirgua (VEN)
1st in Stage 8 Vuelta a Venezuela, Barinas circuito (VEN)
1st in Stage 5 Vuelta al Estado Zulia, Maracaibo (VEN)
3rd in General Classification Vuelta al Estado Zulia (VEN)
2008
1st in Stage 6 Vuelta al Oriente, Puerto La Cruz (VEN)
1st in Stage 2 Vuelta a Yacambu-Lara, Barquisimeto (VEN)
1st in Stage 4 Vuelta a Yacambu-Lara, Quibor (VEN)
1st in Stage 12 Vuelta a Venezuela, Barcelona (VEN)
2009
1st in Clasico Ciudad de Valencia (VEN)
2nd in Clasico Corre Por La Vida, Guanaré (VEN)
1st in Stage 2 Vuelta al Estado Portugesa, Ospina circuito (VEN)
1st in Stage 1 Vuelta Ciclista Aragua, Maracary (VEN)
1st in Stage 5 Vuelta Ciclista Aragua (VEN)
