= Víctor Moreno (cyclist) =

Venezuelan racing cyclist

Personal information
- Full name: Víctor Cecilio Moreno Sevilla
- Born: 15 July 1985 (age 41) Cojedes, Venezuela

Cycling career
- Sport: Cycling
- Current team: Retired
- Discipline: Road
- Role: Rider

Amateur teams
- 2007–2008: Gobernación del Zulia
- 2009: Alcaldía de Maracaibo
- 2013–2017: Gobernación de Carabobo

Víctor Cecilio Moreno Sevilla (born July 15, 1985 in Cojedes) is a Venezuelan former road racing cyclist.

== Major results ==
2006
1st Time trial, National Under-23 Road Championships
1st Stage 4a Vuelta al Estado Portugesa
Vuelta Ciclista Aragua

1st Stages 4 & 6

2007
1st Time trial, National Road Championships
1st Stage 12 Vuelta a Venezuela
1st Mountains classification Volta de Ciclismo Internacional do Estado de São Paulo
3rd Clasico Aniversario de la Federacion Venezolana de Ciclismo
6th Time trial, Pan American Road and Track Championships
2008
1st Virgen de la Candelaria
1st Clasico Ciudad de Valencia
1st Stage 1 Vuelta al Oriente
1st Stage 4 Vuelta Internacional al Estado Trujillo
2nd Time trial, National Road Championships
2nd Overall Vuelta al Estado Zulia
2009
1st Clásico San Francisco de Asís
3rd Time trial, National Road Championships
2012
2nd Virgen de la Candelaria
2013
Vuelta a Venezuela

1st Mountains classification
1st Sprints classification
1st Stage 4

1st Stage 2 Vuelta a Paria
2014
7th Road race, Central American and Caribbean Games
2015
6th Overall Volta Ciclística Internacional do Rio Grande do Sul
