= Lilibeth Chacón =

Venezuelan cyclist (born 1992)

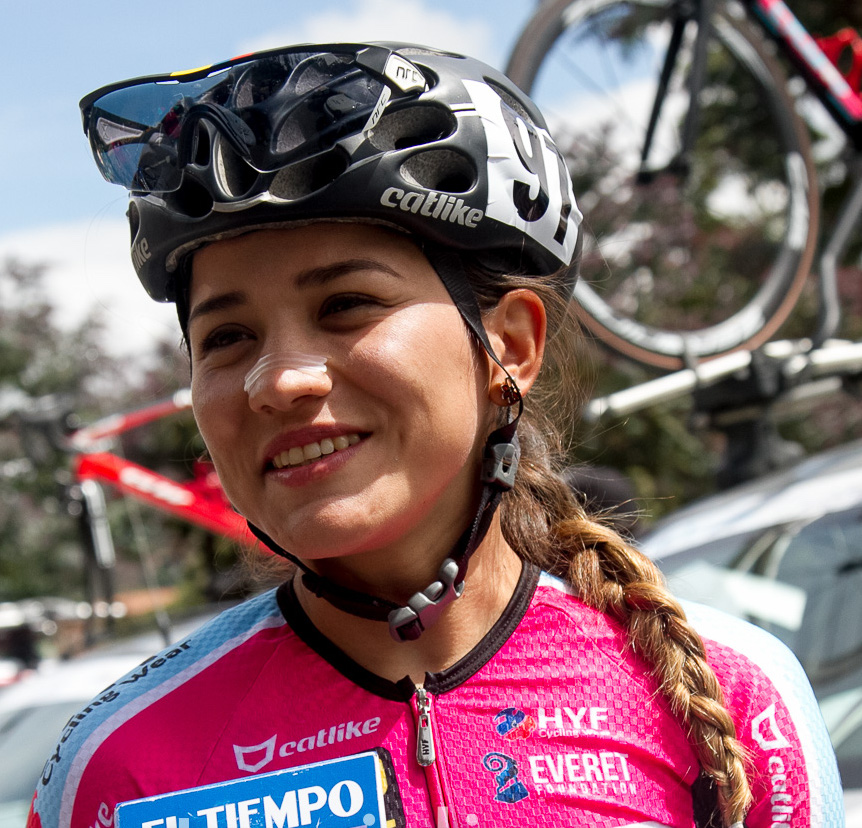
- Lilibeth Chacón at the stage 1 of Vuelta a Colombia Femenina 2018

Personal information
- Full name: Lilibeth del Carmen Chacón García
- Born: 1 March 1992 (age 34) Táchira, Venezuela

Cycling career
- Sport: Cycling
- Role: Rider
Medal record
Representing Venezuela
Women's track cycling
Pan American Championships
Gold medal – first place	2011 Medellin	Points race
Gold medal – first place	2012 Mar del Plata	Scratch
Silver medal – second place	2011 Medellin	Team pursuit
Silver medal – second place	2012 Mar del Plata	Team pursuit
Bronze medal – third place	2014 Aguascalientes	Team pursuit
Central American and Caribbean Games
Bronze medal – third place	2014 Veracruz	Time trial
Bronze medal – third place	2014 Veracruz	Points race
Women's road bicycle racing
Pan American Championships
Gold medal – first place	2022 San Juan	Time trial

Lilibeth del Carmen Chacón García (born 1 March 1992) is a Venezuelan racing cyclist. She competed in the 2012 UCI women's road race in Valkenburg aan de Geul and in the 2013 UCI women's road race in Florence.

== Career results ==
2014
Copa Venezuela

2nd Individual Pursuit
2nd Points Race
3rd Scratch Race

3rd Team Pursuit, Pan American Track Championships (with Yennifer Cesar, Zuralmy Rivas and Angie Sabrina Gonzalez)
3rd Points Race, Central American and Caribbean Games
2016
Copa Venezuela

1st Points Race
2nd Individual Pursuit

2021
1st Overall Vuelta a Colombia Femenina

1st Stages 1, 3 (ITT), 4 & 5
