= Leidy Natalia Muñoz Ruiz =

Colombian cyclist

Personal information
- Full name: Leidy Natalia Muñoz Ruiz
- Born: 4 June 1985 (age 41)

Cycling career
- Sport: Cycling
- Discipline: Road
- Role: Rider

Amateur teams
- 2015: Tre Colli–Forno d'Asolo
- 2018: Pedalea–Los Cabos–JB Ropa Deportiva (guest)
- 2019: Merquimia Colombia
- 2020: SuperGIROS–Alcaldía de Manizales
- 2021: Freevia–ALC Santa Rosa CA

Leidy Natalia Muñoz Ruiz (born 4 June 1985) is a Colombian racing cyclist. She won the Colombian National Road Race Championships in 2015.

== Major results ==
2010
3rd Team pursuit, Pan American Track Championships
2015
1st Road race, National Road Championships
5th Overall Vuelta a Cundinamarca
2018
4th Overall Vuelta Femenina a Guatemala

1st Mountains classification

2019
3rd Overall Vuelta a Colombia Femenina

1st Points classification
1st Stages 3 & 5
