= Jennifer Cesar =

Venezuelan cyclist (born 1989)

Personal information
- Full name: Jennifer Mariana Cesar Salazar
- Born: 26 May 1989 (age 37) Venezuela
- Height: 1.61 m (5 ft 3 in)

Cycling career
- Sport: Cycling
- Disciplines: Road; Track
- Role: Rider

Professional team
- 2017: Servetto Giusta

Major wins
- One-day races and Classics National Road Race Championships (2015, 2017) National Time Trial Championships (2015)
Medal record
Representing Venezuela
Women's track cycling
Pan American Championships
Bronze medal – third place	2013 Mexico City	Team pursuit
Bronze medal – third place	2014 Aguascalientes	Team pursuit
Bolivarian Games
Gold medal – first place	2013 Trujillo	Omnium
Gold medal – first place	2013 Trujillo	Team pursuit
Silver medal – second place	2013 Trujillo	Scratch
Silver medal – second place	2017 Santa Marta	Team pursuit
Women's road cycling
South American Games
Gold medal – first place	2022 Asunción	Road race
Silver medal – second place	2014 Santiago	Road race

Jennifer Mariana Cesar Salazar (born 26 May 1989) is a Venezuelan road and track cyclist. She participated at the 2012 UCI Road World Championships, the 2015 Pan American Games, and the 2016 Summer Olympics.

== Major results ==
2013
Bolivarian Games

1st Omnium
1st Team pursuit
2nd Scratch

3rd Team pursuit, Pan American Track Championships
3rd Time trial, National Road Championships
2014
2nd Road race, South American Games
3rd Team pursuit, Pan American Track Championships
2015
National Road Championships

1st Road race
1st Time trial

2nd Copa Federación Venezolana de Ciclismo
5th Road race, Pan American Road Championships
6th Clasico FVCiclismo Corre Por la VIDA
2016
3rd Road race, National Road Championships
5th Clasico FVCiclismo Corre Por la VIDA
2017
National Road Championships

1st Road race
3rd Time trial

2nd Team pursuit, Bolivarian Games
2018
5th Road race, Central American and Caribbean Games
8th Gran Premio Comite Olimpico Nacional Femenino
2022
1st Road race, South American Games
