= Copa Federación Venezolana de Ciclismo =

Venezuelan one-day road cycling race

Race details
- Date: May
- Region: Venezuela
- Discipline: Road

History
- First edition: 2014

The Copa Federación Venezolana de Ciclismo (also known as the Copa Ciudad de Valencia) is an elite men's and women's professional one-day road bicycle race held in Venezuela and is currently rated by the UCI as a 1.2 race.
