= 2016 Pan American Road Cycling Championships =

- Venue: San Cristóbal, Táchira, Venezuela
- Date: May 19–22, 2016
- Nations participating: 20
- Events: 6

The 2016 Pan American Road Cycling Championships took place at San Cristóbal, Táchira, Venezuela, May 19–22, 2016.

== Medal summary ==
=== Men ===
| Event | Gold | Silver | Bronze |
|---|---|---|---|
| Individual road race | Jonathan Caicedo; Ecuador | Brayan Ramírez; Colombia | Jonathan Monsalve; Venezuela |
| Individual time trial | Walter Vargas; Colombia | Laureano Rosas; Argentina | Cristian Serrano; Colombia |

=== Women ===
| Event | Gold | Silver | Bronze |
|---|---|---|---|
| Individual road race | Iraida García; Cuba | Arlenis Sierra; Cuba | Flavia Cardoso; Brazil |
| Individual time trial | Sérika Gulumá; Colombia | Ana Sanabria; Colombia | Íngrid Drexel; Mexico |

=== Under 23 Men ===
| Event | Gold | Silver | Bronze |
|---|---|---|---|
| Individual road race | José Rodríguez; Chile | Jonathan Villavicencio; Ecuador | Jhon Anderson Rodríguez; Colombia |
| Individual time trial | José Rodríguez; Chile | Carlos Ramírez; Colombia | Jhon Anderson Rodríguez; Colombia |

== Results ==
=== Men elite road race ===
| Rank | Rider | Nation | Time |
|---|---|---|---|
| 1st place, gold medalist(s) | Jonathan Caicedo | Ecuador | 0:49:10.98 |
| 2nd place, silver medalist(s) | Brayan Ramírez | Colombia | 0:49:41.62 |
| 3rd place, bronze medalist(s) | Jonathan Monsalve | Venezuela | 0:50:09.52 |
| 4 | Eder Frayre | Mexico | 0:50:38.54 |
| 5 | Ulises Alfredo Castillo | Mexico | 0:50:53.74 |
| 6 | José Rujano | Venezuela | 0:50:59.90 |
| 7 | Gonzalo Garrido | Chile | 0:51:03.11 |
| 8 | João Pereira | Brazil | 0:51:19.65 |
| 9 | Julio Padilla | Guatemala | 0:51:28.86 |
| 10 | Daniel Díaz | Argentina | 0:52:07.10 |
| 11 | Miguel Álvarez | Mexico | 0:53:26.29 |
| 12 | Christopher Olavarria | Chile | 0:53:38.06 |
| 13 | René Corella | Mexico | 0:53:53.83 |
| 14 | Juan Magellan | Mexico | 0:57:24.78 |
| 15 | Yonder Godoy | Venezuela | 0:57:24.78 |
| 16 | Henry Velasco | Ecuador | 0:57:24.78 |
| 17 | Flavio Moon | Mexico | 0:57:24.78 |
| 18 | Alfredo Ajpacaja | Guatemala | 0:57:24.78 |
| 19 | Byron Guamá | Ecuador | 0:57:24.78 |
| 20 | Patricio Almonacid | Chile | 0:57:24.78 |
| 21 | Diego Milán | Dominican Republic | 0:57:24.78 |
| 22 | Alan Valens | Brazil | 0:57:24.78 |
| 23 | Miguel Ubeto | Venezuela | 0:57:24.78 |
| 24 | Luis Sepúlveda | Chile | 0:57:24.78 |
| 25 | Alonso Gamero | Peru | 0:57:24.78 |
| 26 | Jorge Montenegro | Ecuador | 0:57:24.78 |
| 27 | Rafael Andriato | Brazil | 0:57:24.78 |
| 28 | Manuel Rhodes | Guatemala | 0:57:24.78 |
| 29 | Segundo Navarrete | Ecuador | 0:57:24.78 |
| 30 | Fabricio Quirós | Costa Rica | 0:57:24.78 |
| 31 | Augusto Sánchez | Dominican Republic | 0:57:24.78 |
| 32 | Jackson Rodríguez | Venezuela | 0:57:24.78 |
| 33 | Jan Arias | Cuba | 0:57:24.78 |
| 34 | Allan Hernández | Honduras | 0:57:24.78 |
| 36 | Rubén Ramos | Argentina | 0:57:24.78 |
| 36 | José Irias | Costa Rica | 0:57:24.78 |
| 37 | Elias Vega | Costa Rica | 0:57:24.78 |
| | Robinson Chalapud | Colombia | DNF |
| | Román Villalobos | Costa Rica | DNF |
| | Nervin Jiatz | Guatemala | DNF |
| | Jorge Torres | Honduras | DNF |
| | John llorens | Puerto Rico | DNF |
| | Juan José Cueto | Dominican Republic | DNF |
| | Basílio Ramos | Bolivia | DNF |
| | Walter Vargas | Colombia | DNF |
| | Cristian Serrano | Colombia | DNF |
| | Jonathan Villavicencio | Ecuador | DNF |
| | Jonathan de León | Guatemala | DNF |
| | Edison Bravo | Chile | DNF |
| | Laureano Rosas | Argentina | DNF |
| | Magno Nazaret | Brazil | DNF |
| | José Alarcón | Venezuela | DNF |
| | Lucas Gaday | Argentina | DNF |
| | William Guzmán | Dominican Republic | DNF |
| | Ismael Sánchez | Dominican Republic | DNF |
| | Juan Martínez | Puerto Rico | DNF |
| | Melbin Cano | Nicaragua | DNF |
| | Marlon Samayoa | Nicaragua | DNF |
| | Miguel Alcocer | Argentina | DNF |
| | Joseph Chavarria | Costa Rica | DNF |
| | Alejandro Durán | Argentina | DNF |
| | Brian Babylon | Puerto Rico | DNF |
| | Edgardo Richie | Puerto Rico | DNF |
| | Samuel Colonel | Paraguay | DNF |
| | Jaime Ramírez | Nicaragua | DNF |
| | Ernesto Mora | Paraguay | DNF |
| | Adderlyn Cruz | Dominican Republic | DNF |
| | Argenis Vanegas | Nicaragua | DNF |
| | Gregory Brenes | Costa Rica | DNF |
| | Luis Mansilla | Chile | DNF |

=== Men elite individual time trial ===
| Rank | Rider | Nation | Time |
|---|---|---|---|
| 1st place, gold medalist(s) | Walter Vargas | Colombia | 0:49:10.98 |
| 2nd place, silver medalist(s) | Laureano Rosas | Argentina | 0:49:41.62 |
| 3rd place, bronze medalist(s) | Cristian Serrano | Colombia | 0:50:09.52 |
| 4 | Patricio Almonacid | Chile | 0:50:38.54 |
| 5 | Román Villalobos | Costa Rica | 0:50:53.74 |
| 6 | Alejandro Durán | Argentina | 0:50:59.90 |
| 7 | Manuel Rodas | Guatemala | 0:51:03.11 |
| 8 | Magno Nazaret | Brazil | 0:51:19.65 |
| 9 | Luis Sepúlveda | Chile | 0:51:28.86 |
| 10 | José Rujano | Venezuela | 0:52:07.10 |
| 11 | Flavio de Luna | Mexico | 0:53:26.29 |
| 12 | Yonder Godoy | Venezuela | 0:53:38.06 |
| 13 | Segundo Navarrete | Ecuador | 0:53:53.83 |
| 14 | Ernesto Mora | Paraguay | 0:57:24.78 |

=== Women's road race ===
| Rank | Rider | Nation | Time |
|---|---|---|---|
| 1st place, gold medalist(s) | Iraida García | Cuba | 2:38:26 |
| 2nd place, silver medalist(s) | Arlenis Sierra | Cuba | 2:38:27 |
| 3rd place, bronze medalist(s) | Flavia Cardoso | Brazil | 2:38:27 |
| 4 | Íngrid Drexel | Mexico | 2:38:29 |
| 5 | Wilmary Moreno | Venezuela | 2:38:29 |
| 6 | Laura Lozano | Colombia | 2:38:29 |
| 7 | Ana Sanabria | Colombia | 2:38:30 |
| 8 | Evelyn García | El Salvador | 2:38:32 |
| 9 | Sofía Arreola | Mexico | 2:38:32 |
| 10 | Daniela Lionço | Brazil | 2:38:49 |
| 11 | Erika Valera | Mexico | 2:41:38 |
| 12 | Paola Muñoz | Chile | 2:41:38 |
| 13 | Carolina Rodríguez | Mexico | 2:41:38 |
| 14 | Lilibeth Chacón | Venezuela | 2:41:38 |
| 15 | Yngrid Porras | Venezuela | 2:41:41 |
| 16 | Janildes Fernandes | Brazil | 2:41:43 |
| 17 | Clemilda Fernandes | Brazil | 2:41:44 |
| 18 | Ana Casas | Mexico | 2:41:44 |
| 19 | Daniely García | Venezuela | 2:41:44 |
| 20 | Zuralmy Rivas | Venezuela | 2:41:44 |
| 21 | Luz Tovar | Colombia | 2:41:44 |
| 22 | Marlies Mejías | Cuba | 2:41:44 |
| 23 | Constanza Paredes | Chile | 2:41:44 |
| 24 | Jennifer César | Venezuela | 2:41:44 |
| 25 | Camila Valbuena | Colombia | 2:41:44 |
| 26 | Edith Guillén | Costa Rica | 2:41:44 |
| 27 | Camila Coelho | Brazil | 2:41:44 |
| 28 | Miryan Núñez | Ecuador | 2:41:50 |
| 29 | Yeny Colmenares | Colombia | 2:41:52 |
| 30 | Ana Polegatch | Brazil | 2:41:55 |
| 31 | Mayra Rocha | Mexico | 2:42:04 |
| 32 | Sérika Gulumá | Ecuador | 2:44:26 |
| | Aranza Villalón | Chile | DNF |
| | Nikole Narváez | Ecuador | DNF |
| | Yeneth Amurrio | Bolivia | DNF |
| | Unice Rojas | Costa Rica | DNF |
| | Ana Suarez | Ecuador | DNF |
| | María Vargas | Costa Rica | DNF |
| | Yumari González | Cuba | DNF |
| | Javiera Reyes | Chile | DNF |
| | Gigliola Monichi | Chile | DNF |
| | Sharon Sarabia | Bolivia | DNF |
| | Paula Ruiz | Chile | DNF |

=== Women's time trial ===
| Rank | Rider | Nation | Time |
|---|---|---|---|
| 1st place, gold medalist(s) | Sérika Gulumá | Colombia | 0:27:44.39 |
| 2nd place, silver medalist(s) | Ana Sanabria | Colombia | 0:28:05.62 |
| 3rd place, bronze medalist(s) | Íngrid Drexel | Mexico | 0:28:46.36 |
| 4 | Evelyn García | El Salvador | 0:28:56.98 |
| 5 | Constanza Paredes | Chile | 0:30:07.37 |
| 6 | Jennifer César | Venezuela | 0:30:08.74 |
| 7 | Clemilda Fernandes | Brazil | 0:30:09.88 |
| 8 | Cristina Greve | Argentina | 0:30:36.01 |
| 9 | Daniela Lionço | Brazil | 0:30:56.79 |
| 10 | Ana Suárez | Ecuador | 0:32:26.37 |
| 11 | María Vargas | Costa Rica | 0:32:38.86 |
| 12 | Miryan Núñez | Ecuador | 0:39:12.01 |

=== Under 23 Men road race ===
| Rank | Rider | Nation | Time |
|---|---|---|---|
| 1st place, gold medalist(s) | José Rodríguez | Chile | 3:08:57 |
| 2nd place, silver medalist(s) | Jonathan Villavicencio | Ecuador | 3:09:14 |
| 3rd place, bronze medalist(s) | John Rodríguez | Colombia | 3:09:14 |
| 4 | Carlos Molina | Venezuela | 3:09:16 |
| 5 | Caio Godoy | Brazil | 3:09:29 |
| 6 | Edwar Díaz | Colombia | 3:10:26 |
| 7 | Miguel Flores | Colombia | 3:10:59 |
| 8 | Jefferson Cepeda | Ecuador | 3:11:14 |
| 9 | Germán Tivani | Argentina | 3:15:00 |
| 10 | Anderson Paredes | Venezuela | 3:15:05 |
| 11 | Carlos Ramírez | Colombia | 3:16:28 |
| 12 | Francisco Lara | Mexico | 3:16:40 |
| 13 | Orluis Aular | Venezuela | 3:16:54 |
| 14 | Cristian Pita | Ecuador | 3:17:26 |
| 15 | Celso Ajpacaja | Guatemala | 3:17:32 |
| 16 | Victor Schizzi | Brazil | 3:18:24 |
| 17 | José Rodríguez | Mexico | 3:18:33 |
| 18 | Fernando Arroyo | Mexico | 3:19:22 |
| 19 | Frank Consuegra | Cuba | 3:19:24 |
| 20 | Oscar Serech | Guatemala | 3:19:24 |
| 21 | Renato Tapia | Peru | 3:19:28 |
| 22 | Freddy González | Bolivia | 3:19:29 |
| 23 | Javier Arando | Bolivia | 3:19:29 |
| 24 | Brandon Urrutia | Chile | 3:19:29 |
| 25 | Nicolás Navarro | Argentina | 3:19:31 |
| 26 | Alberto Covarrubias | Mexico | 3:19:33 |
| 27 | José Mendoza | Venezuela | 3:19:34 |
| 28 | Henry Meneses | Venezuela | 3:19:34 |
| 29 | Endrigo Pereira | Brazil | 3:19:42 |
| 30 | Gerson Toc | Guatemala | 3:20:41 |
| | Gabriel Marin | Costa Rica | DNS |
| | Leandro Varela | Costa Rica | DNS |
| | Josué Alpizar | Costa Rica | DNS |
| | Kevin Murillo | Costa Rica | DNS |
| | Daniel Jara | Costa Rica | DNS |
| | Wellinton Canela | Dominican Republic | DNS |
| | Enmanuel Núñez | Dominican Republic | DNS |
| | Robinson Paulino | Dominican Republic | DNS |
| | José Rodríguez | Nicaragua | DNS |
| | Gregory Vanderpool | Barbados | DNF |
| | Matías Muñoz | Chile | DNF |
| | Pedro Rodríguez | Ecuador | DNF |
| | Jhordan Cuaical | Ecuador | DNF |
| | Esteban Villareal | Ecuador | DNF |
| | Ismael Cárdenas | Venezuela | DNF |
| | Andre Téllez | Peru | DNF |
| | Francisco Rivero | Paraguay | DNF |
| | Onel Santaclara | Cuba | DNF |
| | Sebastian Trillini | Argentina | DNF |
| | Alain Quispe | Peru | DNF |
| | Elias Tello | Chile | DNF |
| | Víctor Grange | Paraguay | DNF |
| | Hugo Ruíz | Peru | DNF |
| | Sebastian Reyes | Chile | DNF |
| | Joshua Kelly | Barbados | DNF |
| | Emiliano Contreras | Argentina | DNF |
| | Fernando Torres | Argentina | DNF |
| | José Santoyo | Mexico | DNF |
| | Mauricio Graziani | Argentina | DNF |
| | Andre Gohr | Brazil | DNF |
| | Matías Arriaga | Chile | DNF |
| | Jorge Castro | Costa Rica | DNF |
| | Salvador Martínez | El Salvador | DNF |

=== Under 23 Men time trial ===
| Rank | Rider | Nation | Time |
|---|---|---|---|
| 1st place, gold medalist(s) | José Rodríguez | Chile | 0:32:59.49 |
| 2nd place, silver medalist(s) | Carlos Ramírez | Colombia | 0:33:49.35 |
| 3rd place, bronze medalist(s) | John Rodríguez | Colombia | 0:34:33.25 |
| 4 | Sebastián Trillini | Argentina | 0:34:38.14 |
| 5 | Víctor Grange | Paraguay | 0:35:21.07 |
| 6 | Orluis Aular | Venezuela | 0:35:22.22 |
| 7 | Emiliano Contreras | Argentina | 0:35:26.29 |
| 8 | Fernando Arroyo | Mexico | 0:32:59.49 |
| 9 | Freddy González | Bolivia | 0:36:27.88 |
| 10 | Endrigo Pereira | Brazil | 0:36:34.59 |
| 11 | Joshua Kelly | Barbados | 0:37:15.04 |
| 12 | Jefferson Cepeda | Ecuador | 0:37:16.16 |
| 13 | Javier Arando | Bolivia | 0:37:18.82 |
| 14 | Andre Gohr | Brazil | 0:37:20.20 |
| 15 | Frank Consuegra | Cuba | 0:37:25.78 |
| 16 | Matías Muñoz | Chile | 0:37:29.61 |
| 17 | José Rodríguez | Nicaragua | 0:37:47.08 |
| 18 | Ismael Cárdenas | Venezuela | 0:38:19.49 |
| 19 | Pedro Rodríguez | Ecuador | 0:38:30.16 |
| 20 | Andre Téllez | Peru | 0:39:17.08 |

== Controversies ==
Both Cycling Canada and USA Cycling decided not to attend to the Pan American Championships despite the impact on the 2016 World Championships and the Cycling at the 2016 Summer Olympics due to the ongoing Venezuelan unrest, citing "security concerns". The location of the championships requires flying to Cúcuta, Colombia then taking ground transportation to Táchira, having the border an ongoing increased violence advice from the Canadian and American governments. Earlier in the year, during the 2016 Vuelta al Táchira, riders and technical personnel from Italy suffered the robbery from personal belongings and Venezuelan rider Carlos Castro had his bike robbed.

After spending from 13 May to 17 stranded in the Colombian border, cyclists and technical personnel from Chile could finally manage to go through and arrived at San Cristóbal, Táchira on Tuesday 17 May. The Colombian customs authorities denied the passing of goods, but the delegations from Costa Rica, Brazil and Chile were halted in the border and had their practices affected.

During the inaugural session of the championships, protestors demanded in the streets of Rubio were the time trials started, that the National Electoral Council concede the revocatory referendum against Venezuelan President Nicolás Maduro.
