= 2014 UnitedHealthcare season =

American cycling team season

2014 UnitedHealthcare season
Manager	Thierry Attias
One-day victories	1
Stage race overall victories	–
Stage race stage victories	4
Previous season • Next season

The 2014 season for the UnitedHealthcare cycling team began in January at the Tour de San Luis. The team participated in UCI Continental Circuits and UCI World Tour events when given a wildcard invitation.

== 2014 roster ==
As of January 6, 2014.

Rider	Date of birth
Carlos Alzate (COL)	March 23, 1983 (age 43)
Alessandro Bazzana (ITA)	July 16, 1984 (age 41)
Isaac Bolivar (COL)	May 9, 1991 (age 35)
Hilton Clarke (AUS)	July 11, 1979 (age 46)
Jonathan Clarke (AUS)	December 18, 1984 (age 41)
Benjamin Day (AUS)	December 11, 1978 (age 47)
Marc de Maar (CUR)	February 15, 1984 (age 42)
Lucas Euser (USA)	December 5, 1983 (age 42)
Robert Förster (GER)	January 27, 1978 (age 48)
Davide Frattini (ITA)	August 6, 1978 (age 47)
Ken Hanson (USA)	April 14, 1982 (age 44)
Adrian Hegyvary (USA)	January 15, 1984 (age 42)

Rider	Date of birth
Aldo Ino Ilešič (SLO)	September 1, 1984 (age 41)
Martyn Irvine (IRL)	June 6, 1985 (age 40)
Christopher Jones (USA)	August 6, 1979 (age 46)
Luke Keough (USA)	August 10, 1991 (age 34)
Jeff Louder (USA)	December 8, 1977 (age 48)
Martijn Maaskant (NED)	July 27, 1983 (age 42)
Karl Menzies (AUS)	June 17, 1977 (age 48)
John Murphy (USA)	December 15, 1984 (age 41)
Kiel Reijnen (USA)	June 1, 1986 (age 39)
Danny Summerhill (USA)	January 28, 1989 (age 37)
Bradley White (USA)	January 15, 1982 (age 44)

Riders who joined the team for the 2014 season

Rider	2013 team
Isaac Bolivar	neo-pro (Aguardiente Antioquena)
Ken Hanson	neo-pro (Optum–Kelly Benefit Strategies)
Martijn Maaskant	Garmin–Sharp

Riders who left the team during or after the 2013 season

Rider	2014 team
Philip Deignan	Team Sky
Jake Keough	5-hour Energy

== Season victories ==
Date	Race	Competition	Rider	Country	Location
March 3	Tour de Langkawi, Stage 5	UCI Asia Tour	Bradley White (USA)	Malaysia	Rembau
March 9	Tour de Taiwan, Stage 1	UCI Asia Tour	Luke Keough (USA)	Taiwan	Taipei
May 4	Tour of Turkey, Mountains classification	UCI Europe Tour	Marc de Maar (CUR)	Turkey	
May 22	Tour of Norway, Stage 2	UCI Europe Tour	Marc de Maar (CUR)	Norway	Sarpsborg
June 1	Philadelphia International Cycling Classic	UCI America Tour	Kiel Reijnen (USA)	United States	Philadelphia
August 10	Danmark Rundt, Mountains classification	UCI Europe Tour	John Murphy (USA)	Denmark	
August 18	USA Pro Cycling Challenge, Stage 1	UCI America Tour	Kiel Reijnen (USA)	United States	Aspen
August 24	USA Pro Cycling Challenge, Sprints classification	UCI America Tour	Kiel Reijnen (USA)	United States	
