= Cycling at the 2017 Bolivarian Games =

- Dates: 12–24 November 2017
- Nations: 11

Four disciplines of cycling will be contested at the 2017 Bolivarian Games: road cycling, track cycling, mountain biking and BMX racing. A total of twenty-nine medal events will be held.

== Medal summary ==
=== Road cycling ===
Event	Gold		Silver		Bronze	
Men's road race	Juan Pablo Suárez; Colombia	3:30:18	Anderson Timoteo Paredes; Venezuela	s.t	Nelson Soto; Colombia	3:30:39
Men's time trial	Rodrigo Contreras; Colombia	44:23	Carlos Ramírez; Colombia	45:00	Patricio Almonacid; Chile	45:45
Women's road race	Lilibeth Chacón; Venezuela	2:50:10	Diana Peñuela; Colombia	s.t	Paula Patiño; Colombia	s.t
Women's time trial	Aranza Villalón; Chile	24:22	Ana Sanabria; Colombia	25:04	Lilibeth Chacón; Venezuela	26:08

=== Track cycling ===
==== Men ====
Event	Gold		Silver		Bronze	
1 km time trial	Fabián Puerta; Colombia	01:00.761	Anderson Parra; Colombia	01:02.392	Luis Yanez; Venezuela	01:03.122
Sprint	Fabián Puerta; Colombia		Santiago Ramírez; Colombia		Brandon Pineda; Guatemala	
Team sprint	Colombia; Fabián Puerta; Rubén Murillo; Santiago Ramírez		Venezuela; César Marcano; Hersony Canelón; Luis Yanez	DSQ	Guatemala; Brandon Pineda; Claudio Castro; Luis Cordon	46.248
Individual pursuit	Eduardo Estrada; Colombia	04:26.57	Brayan Sánchez; Colombia	04:27.411	Elías Tello; Chile	04:32.705
Team pursuit	Colombia; Brayan Sánchez; Eduardo Estrada; Juan Esteban Arango; Carlos Tobón	4:10.238	Chile; Antonio Cabrera; Felipe Peñaloza; Cristian Cornejo; Elías Tello	4:18.123	Venezuela; Víctor Moreno; Clever Martínez; Leonel Quintero; Robert Sierra	2:09.44
Keirin	Fabián Puerta; Colombia		Santiago Ramírez; Colombia		Brandon Pineda; Guatemala	
Scratch race	Carlos Tobón; Colombia		Luis Fernando Sepulveda; Chile		Maximo Rojas; Venezuela	
Points race	Jorge Luis Montenegro; Ecuador	92 pts	Maximo Rojas; Venezuela	90 pts	Elías Tello; Chile	89 pts
Omnium	Juan Esteban Arango; Colombia	192 pts	Felipe Peñaloza; Chile	161 pts	Enrique Díaz; Venezuela	133 pts

==== Women ====
Event	Gold		Silver		Bronze	
500 m time trial	Martha Bayona; Colombia	33.868	Diana García; Colombia	34.690	Mariesthela Vilera; Venezuela	35.734
Sprint	Martha Bayona; Colombia		Diana García; Colombia		Mariesthela Vilera; Venezuela	
Team sprint	Colombia; Mariana Pajón; Martha Bayona	33.630	Venezuela; Mariesthela Vilera; Yolimar Pérez	35.299	Guatemala; Joanne Rodriguez; María Jiménez Galicia	
Individual pursuit	Lilibeth Chacón; Venezuela	3:41.466	Jessica Parra; Colombia	3:42.834	Camila Valbuena; Colombia	3:46.208
Team pursuit	Colombia; Milena Salcedo; Jessica Parra; Camila Valbuena; Tatiana Dueñas	2:18.153	Venezuela; Danielys Garcia; Jennifer Cesar; Lilibeth Chacón; Zuralmy Rivas	2:52.282	Chile; Daniela Guajardo; Anany Muñoz; Carolina Oyarzo; Paula Villalon	
Keirin	Martha Bayona; Colombia		Diana García; Colombia		María Jiménez Galicia; Guatemala	
Scratch race	Angie González; Venezuela		Milena Salcedo; Colombia		Zuralmy Rivas; Venezuela	
Points race	Jessica Parra; Colombia	20 pts	Lilibeth Chacón; Venezuela	15 pts	Miryam Nuñez; Ecuador	13 pts
Omnium	Angie González; Venezuela	145 pts	Lorena Colmenares; Colombia	140 pts	Miryam Nuñez; Ecuador	129 pts

=== Mountain biking ===
Event	Gold		Silver		Bronze	
Men's cross-country	Fabio Castañeda; Colombia	1:24:54	Ever Gómez; Bolivia	1:27:57	Jhonnatan Botero Villegas; Colombia	1:29:37
Men's downhill	Rafael Gutiérrez; Colombia	2:46.002	Alejandro Paz Calmet; Peru	2:49.760	Mario Jarrin Molina; Ecuador	2:49.851
Women's cross-country	Laura Abril; Colombia	1:19:47	Michela Molina Arizaga; Ecuador	1:24:41	Yosiana Quintero Pineda; Colombia	1:29:27

=== BMX ===
Event	Gold		Silver		Bronze	
Men time trial	Diego Arboleda; Colombia	36.103	Carlos Ramírez; Colombia	36.438	Alfredo Campo; Ecuador	36.510
Men 20 inch	Carlos Ramírez; Colombia		Alfredo Campo; Ecuador		Diego Arboleda; Colombia	
Women time trial	Mariana Pajón; Colombia	40.290	Doménica Azuero; Ecuador	41.560	Stefany Hernández; Venezuela	41.781
Women 20 inch	Mariana Pajón; Colombia		Doménica Azuero; Ecuador		Stefany Hernández; Venezuela	

== Medal table ==
* Host nation (Colombia)

Rank	Nation	Gold	Silver	Bronze	Total
1	Colombia (COL)*	23	14	6	43
2	Venezuela (VEN)	4	6	10	20
3	Ecuador (ECU)	1	4	4	9
4	Chile (CHI)	1	3	4	8
5	Bolivia (BOL)	0	1	0	1
5	Peru (PER)	0	1	0	1
7	Guatemala (GUA)	0	0	5	5
Totals (7 entries)		29	29	29	87
