= Colnago CM Team =

Colombian cycling team

Team information
- Registered: Colombia
- Founded: 2020
- Discipline: Road
- Status: National team (2020); UCI Women's WorldTeams (2021–)
- Bicycles: Colnago

Team name history
- 2020–: Colnago CM Team

Colnago CM Team is a Colombian professional Women's cycling team, which competes in the UCI Women's World Tour and other elite races. The team was founded in 2020.

== Major results ==
2021
Stage 4 Vuelta Femenina a Guatemala, Erika Botero

== Continental & national Champions ==
2021
Ukraine Time Trial, Valeria Kononenko
Pan American Track (Team Pursuit), Tatiana Dueñas
