= Juliana Londoño =

Colombian cyclist (born 2005)

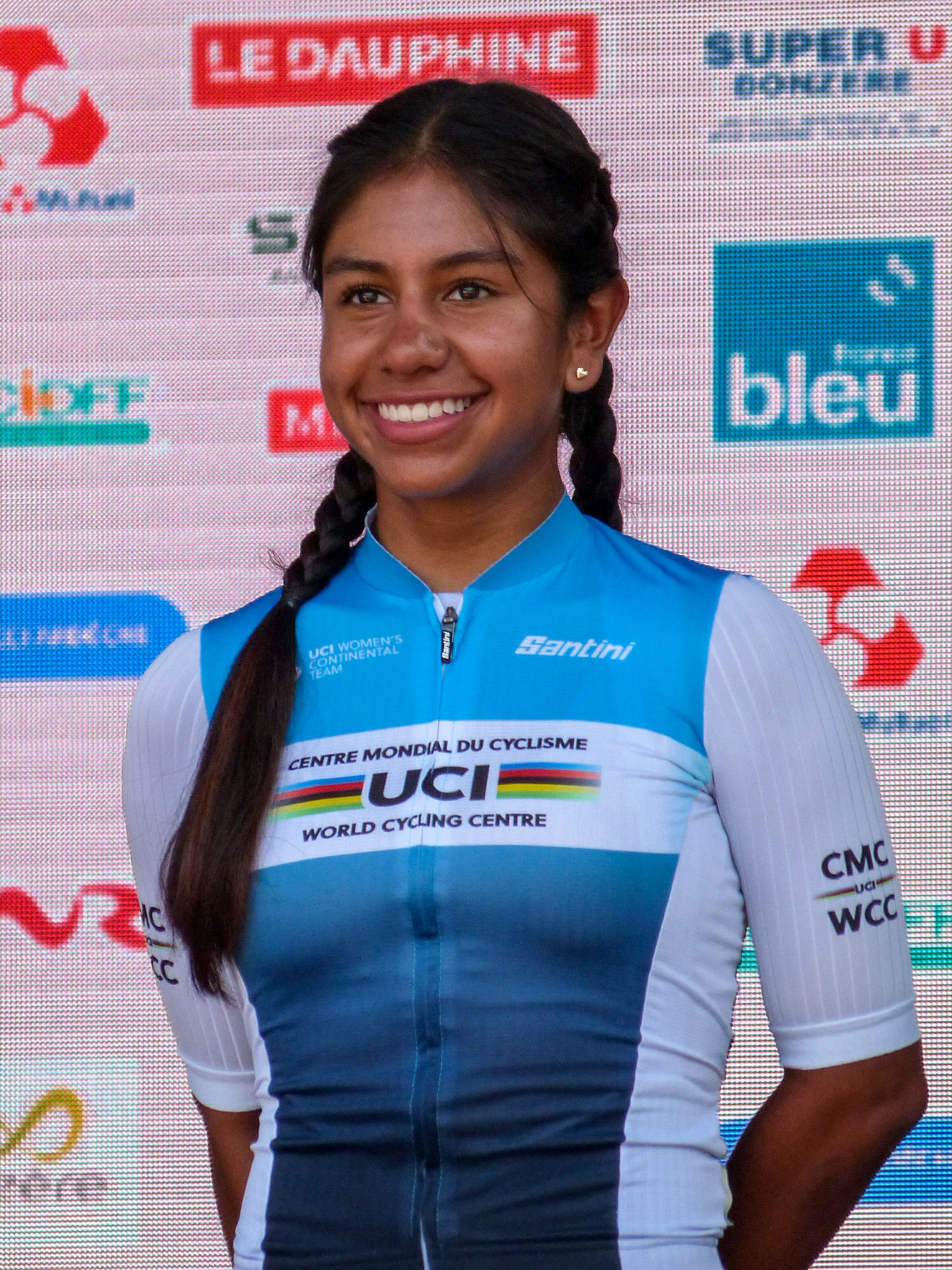
- Londoño in 2024

Personal information
- Full name: Juliana Londoño
- Born: 14 January 2005 (age 21) Medellín, Colombia

Cycling career
- Sport: Cycling
- Current team: Team Picnic–PostNL
- Disciplines: Road; Track
- Role: Rider

Amateur team
- 2023: Prototype Women's Cycling Team

Professional teams
- 2024: WCC Team
- 2025–: Team Picnic–PostNL
Medal record
Representing Colombia
Women's track cycling
| Event | 1st | 2nd | 3rd |
|---|---|---|---|
| World Junior Championships | 1 | 1 | 0 |
| Pan American Games | 0 | 0 | 1 |
| Pan American Championships | 0 | 2 | 0 |
| Bolivarian Games | 0 | 1 | 0 |
| Pan American Junior Championships | 5 | 0 | 0 |
| Total | 6 | 4 | 1 |
Pan American Games
| Bronze medal – third place | 2023 Santiago | Team pursuit |
Pan American Championships
| Silver medal – second place | 2024 Carson | Elimination |
| Silver medal – second place | 2024 Carson | Madison |
Bolivarian Games
| Silver medal – second place | 2025 Lima-Ayacucho | Team pursuit |
World Junior Championships
| Gold medal – first place | 2023 Cali | Omnium |
| Silver medal – second place | 2023 Cali | Individual pursuit |
Pan American Junior Championships
| Gold medal – first place | 2023 Asunción | Individual pursuit |
| Gold medal – first place | 2023 Asunción | Omnium |
| Gold medal – first place | 2023 Asunción | Scratch |
| Gold medal – first place | 2023 Asunción | Madison |
| Gold medal – first place | 2023 Asunción | Team pursuit |
Women's road cycling
| Event | 1st | 2nd | 3rd |
|---|---|---|---|
| Pan American Championships | 1 | 0 | 0 |
| Bolivarian Games | 1 | 0 | 0 |
| Pan American Junior Championships | 1 | 1 | 0 |
| Total | 3 | 1 | 0 |
Pan American Championships
| Gold medal – first place | 2025 Punta del Este | Road race |
Bolivarian Games
| Gold medal – first place | 2025 Lima-Ayacucho | Road race |
Pan American Junior Championships
| Gold medal – first place | 2023 Panama City | Time trial |
| Silver medal – second place | 2023 Panama City | Road race |

Juliana Londoño (born 14 January 2005) is a Colombian professional cyclist, who currently rides for Team Picnic–PostNL.

In 2025, Londoño won the Pan American Road Championships road race in a reduced bunch sprint, for Colombia's first win at the race since 2001.

== Major results ==
=== Road ===
2023
Pan American Road Championships

1st Junior time trial
2nd Junior road race

2025
Pan American Road Championships

1st Road race
6th Time trial

Bolivarian Games

1st Road race

National Championships

1st Road race
5th Time trial
