= Ralph Monsalve =

Venezuelan cyclist

Personal information
- Full name: Ralph Michael Monsalve Pertsinidis
- Born: 24 January 1987 (age 39) Barinas, Venezuela

Cycling career
- Sport: Cycling
- Discipline: Road
- Role: Rider

Amateur teams
- 2015: JHS Aves–Intac. Tachira
- 2017: Gobernación de Carabobo
- 2019–2020: Venezuela Pais Futuro–Fina Arroz

Professional team
- 2018: Qinghai Tianyoude Cycling Team

Ralph Michael Monsalve Pertsinidis (born 24 January 1987) is a Venezuelan racing cyclist, who most recently rode for Venezuelan amateur team Venezuela Pais Futuro–Fina Arroz. He is the older brother of fellow racing cyclist Yonathan Monsalve.

== Major results ==
2007
3rd Clasico Corre por la Vida
5th Road race, Pan American Road and Track Championships
2011
9th Copa Federacion Venezolana De Ciclismo Corre Por La Vida
2013
9th Road race, National Road Championships
2015
5th Overall Vuelta a Venezuela
2017
8th Road race, National Road Championships
2018
1st Road race, National Road Championships
2019
5th Road race, National Road Championships
7th Overall Vuelta Ciclista a Miranda
2020
1st Stage 2 Vuelta al Táchira
