= Brayan Ramírez =

Brayan Ramírez may refer to:

- Brayan Ramírez (cyclist) (born 1992), Colombian cyclist
- Brayan Ramírez (footballer) (born 1994), Honduran footballer
