= Hernando Bohórquez =

Colombian bicycle racer

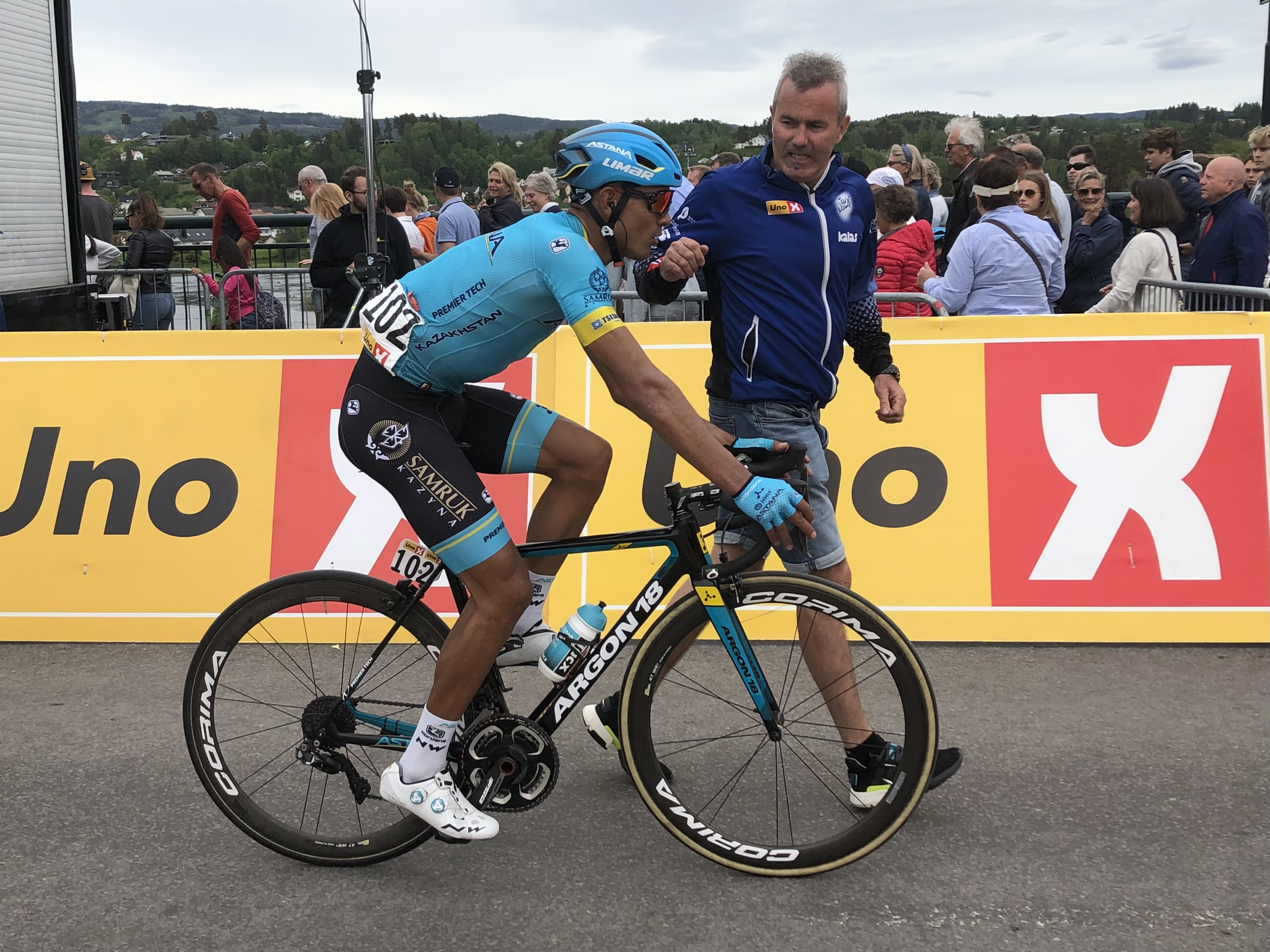

Personal information
- Full name: Hernando Bohórquez Sánchez
- Born: 22 June 1992 (age 34) Úmbita, Colombia
- Height: 1.78 m (5 ft 10 in)
- Weight: 68 kg (150 lb)

Cycling career
- Sport: Cycling
- Discipline: Road
- Role: Rider

Amateur teams
- 2013: Muebles Elegant House
- 2014: Lotería de Boyacá
- 2015: Raza de Campeones Loteria da Boyacá

Professional teams
- 2016–2018: Team Manzana Postobón
- 2019–2020: Astana

Hernando Bohórquez Sánchez (born 22 June 1992) is a Colombian cyclist, who most recently rode for UCI WorldTeam Astana. He was named in the startlist for the 2017 Vuelta a España.

== Major results ==
2012
Vuelta a Colombia Under-23

1st Stages 2 & 5

7th Road race, UCI Under-23 Road World Championships
2013
3rd Time trial, National Under-23 Road Championships
5th Road race, Pan American Under-23 Road Championships
2014
3rd Road race, Pan American Under-23 Road Championships
3rd Road race, National Under-23 Road Championships
7th Road race, UCI Under-23 Road World Championships
2015
3rd Time trial, National Road Championships
2018
2nd Overall Tour of Qinghai Lake

=== Grand Tour general classification results timeline ===
Grand Tour	2017
Giro d'Italia	—
Tour de France	—
Vuelta a España	93

Legend
—	Did not compete
DNF	Did not finish
