= Carlos Ospina =

Colombian bicycle racer

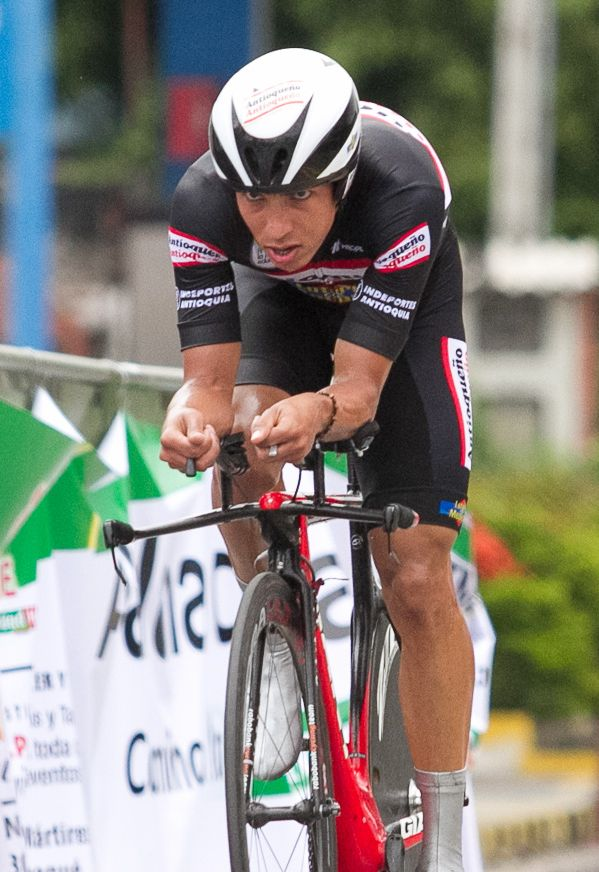

Personal information
- Full name: Carlos Alberto Ospina Hernández
- Born: 10 September 1982 (age 44) Nechí, Colombia

Cycling career
- Sport: Cycling
- Current team: Retired
- Discipline: Road
- Role: Rider

Professional teams
- 2011–2014: Gobernación de Antioquia–Indeportes Antioquia
- 2016–2017: RTS–Monton Racing Team

Carlos Alberto Ospina Hernández (born 10 September 1982 in Nechí) is a Colombian former professional cyclist.

== Major results ==
2008
3rd Overall Cinturón a Mallorca
2009
1st Prologue (TTT) Vuelta a Colombia
2010
1st Time trial, National Road Championships
2011
2nd Road race, National Road Championships
2013
1st Time trial, National Road Championships
2014
3rd Tobago Cycling Classic
