= 2021 Pan American Track Cycling Championships =

- Venue: Lima, Peru
- Date(s): 26–29 June
- Nations participating: 17
- Cyclists participating: 128
- Events: 22

The 2021 Pan American Track Cycling Championships took place at the National Sports Village (VIDENA) velodrome in Lima, Peru from 26 to 29 June 2021.

== Medal summary ==
=== Men ===
| Event | Gold | Silver | Bronze |
|---|---|---|---|
| Sprint | Kevin Quintero; Colombia | Santiago Ramírez; Colombia | Edgar Verdugo; Mexico |
| Team sprint | Colombia; Rubén Murillo; Kevin Quintero; Santiago Ramírez | Trinidad and Tobago; Keron Bramble; Njisane Phillip; Zion Pulido | Argentina; Leandro Bottasso; Franco Victorio; Lucas Vilar |
| Team pursuit | Colombia; Juan Esteban Arango; Julián Osorio; Jordan Parra; Brayan Sánchez | Mexico; Tomás Aguirre; Edibaldo Maldonado; Ricardo Peña; Jorge Peyrot | Argentina; Tomás Contte; Juan Ignacio Curuchet; Lucas Dundick; Rubén Ramos |
| Keirin | Kevin Quintero; Colombia | Santiago Ramírez; Colombia | Njisane Phillip; Trinidad and Tobago |
| Omnium | Ricardo Peña; Mexico | Juan Esteban Arango; Colombia | Tomás Contte; Argentina |
| Madison | Mexico; José Muñiz; Jorge Peyrot | Colombia; Juan Esteban Arango; Brayan Sánchez | Chile; Antonio Cabrera; Felipe Peñaloza |
| 1 km time trial | Kevin Quintero; Colombia | Santiago Ramírez; Colombia | Juan Ruiz; Mexico |
| Individual pursuit | Brayan Sánchez; Colombia | Bryan Gómez; Colombia | Edibaldo Maldonado; Mexico |
| Points race | Bryan Gómez; Colombia | Felipe Peñaloza; Chile | Robert Sierra; Venezuela |
| Scratch | Akil Campbell; Trinidad and Tobago | Jamol Eastmond; Barbados | Julio Padilla; Guatemala |
| Elimination race | Jordan Parra; Colombia | Juan Ignacio Curuchet; Argentina | Cristián Arriagada; Chile |

=== Women ===
| Event | Gold | Silver | Bronze |
|---|---|---|---|
| Sprint | Martha Bayona; Colombia | Yuli Verdugo; Mexico | Juliana Gaviria; Colombia |
| Team sprint | Colombia; Martha Bayona; Juliana Gaviria; Yarli Mosquera | Mexico; Sofía Martínez; Melanie Ramírez; Yuli Verdugo | Argentina; Valentina Luna; Milagros Sanabria; Natalia Vera |
| Team pursuit | Colombia; Tatiana Dueñas; Lina Hernández; Jessica Parra; Lina Rojas | Mexico; Yareli Acevedo; Sofía Arreola; Romina Hinojosa; Victoria Velasco | Chile; Daniela Guajardo; Paola Muñoz; Aranza Villalón; Paula Villalón |
| Keirin | Yuli Verdugo; Mexico | Martha Bayona; Colombia | Juliana Gaviria; Colombia |
| Omnium | Lina Hernández; Colombia | Maggie Coles-Lyster; Canada | Victoria Velasco; Mexico |
| Madison | Mexico; Yareli Acevedo; Victoria Velasco | Colombia; Tatiana Dueñas; Jessica Parra | Ecuador; Dayana Aguilar; Miryam Núñez |
| 500 m time trial | Martha Bayona; Colombia | Natalia Vera; Argentina | Marianis Salazar; Colombia |
| Individual pursuit | Lina Hernández; Colombia | Yareli Acevedo; Mexico | Jessica Parra; Colombia |
| Points race | Yareli Acevedo; Mexico | Maggie Coles-Lyster; Canada | Amber Joseph; Barbados |
| Scratch | Amber Joseph; Barbados | Victoria Velasco; Mexico | Alexi Costa; Trinidad and Tobago |
| Elimination race | Lina Hernández; Colombia | Maggie Coles-Lyster; Canada | Sofía Arreola; Mexico |

== Medal table ==
| Rank | Nation | Gold | Silver | Bronze | Total |
|---|---|---|---|---|---|
| 1 | Colombia | 15 | 8 | 4 | 27 |
| 2 | Mexico | 5 | 6 | 5 | 16 |
| 3 | Trinidad and Tobago | 1 | 1 | 2 | 4 |
| 4 | Barbados | 1 | 1 | 1 | 3 |
| 5 | Canada | 0 | 3 | 0 | 3 |
| 6 | Argentina | 0 | 2 | 4 | 6 |
| 7 | Chile | 0 | 1 | 3 | 4 |
| 8 | Ecuador | 0 | 0 | 1 | 1 |
| 8 | Guatemala | 0 | 0 | 1 | 1 |
| 8 | Venezuela | 0 | 0 | 1 | 1 |
| Totals (10 entries) | | 22 | 22 | 22 | 66 |
