= Walter Vargas =

Colombian cyclist (born 1992)

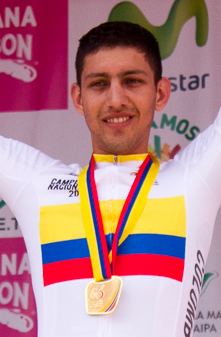
- Vargas in 2016

Personal information
- Full name: Walter Alejandro Vargas Alzate
- Born: 16 April 1992 (age 34) El Carmen de Viboral, Colombia

Cycling career
- Sport: Cycling
- Current team: Team Medellín–EPM
- Discipline: Road
- Role: Rider
- Rider type: Time-trialist

Amateur teams
- 2014: Rionegro Con Más Futuro
- 2016: Aguardiente Antioqueño–Lotería de Medellín–Idea Indeportes Antioquia

Professional teams
- 2015: Orgullo Antioqueño
- 2017–: Medellín–Inder

Major wins
- One-day races and Classics Pan American Time Trial Championships (2016, 2018, 2021, 2023, 2024, 2025, 2026) National Time Trial Championships (2016, 2021)
Medal record
Representing Colombia
Men's road cycling
Event	1st	2nd	3rd
Pan American Games	1	0	0
Pan American Championships	7	1	0
CAC Games	1	2	0
South American Games	1	2	0
Bolivarian Games	2	0	0
Total	12	5	0
Pan American Games
Gold medal – first place	2023 Santiago	Time trial
Pan American Championships
Gold medal – first place	2016 San Cristóbal	Time trial
Gold medal – first place	2018 San Juan	Time trial
Gold medal – first place	2021 Santo Domingo	Time trial
Gold medal – first place	2023 Panama City	Time trial
Gold medal – first place	2024 São José dos Campos	Time trial
Gold medal – first place	2025 Punta del Este	Time trial
Gold medal – first place	2026 Montería	Time trial
Silver medal – second place	2022 San Juan	Time trial
Central American and Caribbean Games
Gold medal – first place	2026 Santo Domingo	Time trial
Silver medal – second place	2018 Barranquilla	Time trial
Silver medal – second place	2023 San Salvador	Time trial
South American Games
Gold medal – first place	2022 Asunción	Time trial
Silver medal – second place	2018 Cochabamba	Time trial
Silver medal – second place	2026 Santa Fe	Time trial
Bolivarian Games
Gold medal – first place	2022 Valledupar	Time trial
Gold medal – first place	2025 Lima-Ayacucho	Time trial

Walter Alejandro Vargas Alzate (born 16 April 1992) is a Colombian professional racing cyclist, who currently rides for UCI Continental team Team Medellín–EPM. He won the Colombian National Time Trial Championships in 2016.

== Major results ==
2016
1st Time trial, Pan American Road Championships
1st Time trial, National Road Championships
2017
3rd Time trial, National Road Championships
8th Overall Vuelta Ciclista de Chile
2018
1st Time trial, Pan American Road Championships
2nd Time trial, CAC Games
2nd Time trial, South American Games
3rd Time trial, National Road Championships
2019
1st Overall Vuelta del Uruguay

1st Stage 6 (ITT)

1st Stage 1 (TTT) Tour of Qinghai Lake
4th Time trial, Pan American Road Championships
5th Time trial, National Road Championships
2021
1st Time trial, Pan American Road Championships
1st Time trial, National Road Championships
2022
1st Time trial, South American Games
1st Time trial, Bolivarian Games
Pan American Road Championships

2nd Time trial
6th Road race

4th Time trial, National Road Championships
2023
1st Time trial, Pan American Games
2nd Time trial, CAC Games
1st Stage 1 Clásica de Ciclismo Ciudad Santiago de Arma-Rionegro
1st Time trial, Pan American Road Championships
1st Stage 3 (ITT) Tour of the Gila
2nd Time trial, National Road Championships
2024
1st Time trial, Pan American Road Championships
1st Overall Vuelta a Venezuela

1st Stage 4 (ITT)

2nd Overall Tour of the Gila
2nd Overall Jamaica International Cycling Classic
5th Time trial, National Road Championships
2025
1st Time trial, Pan American Road Championships
1st Time trial, Bolivarian Games
2nd Time trial, National Road Championships

2026
1st Time trial, Pan American Road Championships
1st Time trial, CAC Games
2nd Time trial, South American Games
