= Xavier Quevedo =

Venezuelan cyclist

Personal information
- Full name: Xavier Antonio Quevedo Chinchilla
- Born: 21 January 1991 (age 35) Bachaquero, Zulia, Venezuela

Cycling career
- Sport: Cycling
- Current team: Venezuela País de Futuro
- Discipline: Road
- Role: Rider

Amateur teams
- 2010–2011: Fund Nelson Cabrera Gob Soc Trujillo
- 2012: Gobernación del Zulia
- 2014–2017: Gobernación de Yaracuy–Androni
- 2018: Gobernación de Miranda–Trek
- 2018: Gobernación Bolivariana de Carabobo
- 2019: Venezuela País de Futuro–Fina Arroz
- 2021–: Venezuela País de Futuro–Fina Arroz

Xavier Antonio Quevedo Chinchilla (born 21 January 1991) is a Venezuelan racing cyclist. He rode at the 2014 UCI Road World Championships.

== Major results ==
2011
1st Stage 3 Vuelta a Venezuela
2012
1st Road race, National Road Championships
1st Stage 4 Vuelta a Venezuela
2014
1st Road race, National Road Championships
1st Points classification Vuelta a Venezuela
6th Road race, Central American and Caribbean Games
2015
Vuelta a Venezuela

1st Points classification
1st Stage 8

9th Copa Federación Venezolana de Ciclismo
2016
Vuelta a Venezuela

1st Stages 9 & 10

10th Overall Tour du Maroc
2017
Vuelta a Venezuela

1st Points classification
1st Stages 2 & 10

6th Road race, Pan American Road Championships
2019
Vuelta a Venezuela

1st Stages 1 & 7

1st Stage 5 Vuelta a Miranda
2021
1st Stage 5 Vuelta a Venezuela
2022
Vuelta al Táchira

1st Points classification
1st Stage 3

2nd Road race, National Road Championships
