= Pedro Herrera (cyclist) =

Colombian cyclist

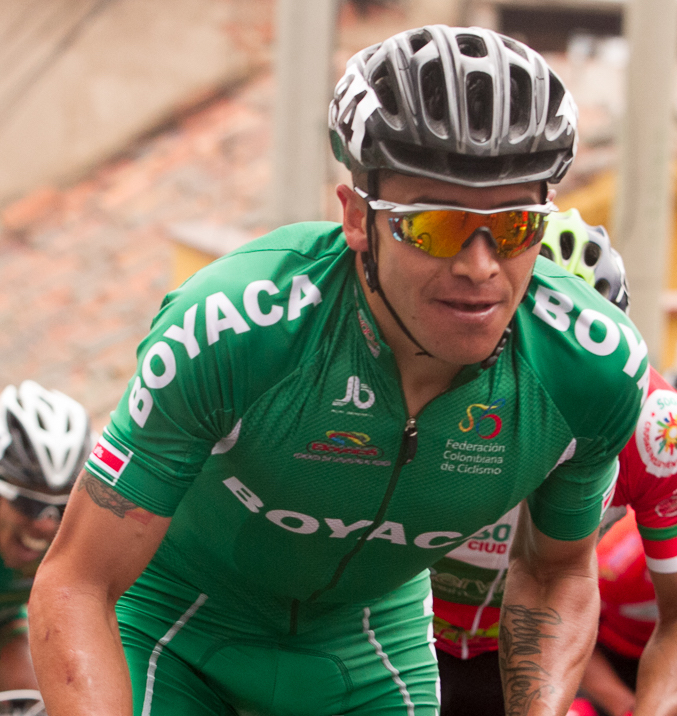
- Herrera in 2016

Personal information
- Full name: Pedro Antonio Herrera Moreno
- Born: 7 October 1986 (age 40) Tunja, Boyacá, Colombia

Cycling career
- Sport: Cycling
- Current team: EBSA–Indeportes Boyacá
- Discipline: Road
- Role: Rider
- Rider type: Time-trialist; Rouleur

Amateur teams
- 2008: Indeportes Boyacá
- 2010: EBSA
- 2011: Gobernación de Boyacá–Alcaldía Paipa
- 2012: Lotería de Boyacá–Indeportes Boyacá
- 2013: EBSA–Indeportes Boyacá
- 2014: Formesán–Bogotá Humana
- 2015: EBSA–Indeportes Boyacá
- 2016–2017: Team Arroz Sonora–Dimonex
- 2018: EBSA–Indeportes Boyacá
- 2019–2020: CC Vauclinois
- 2020–: EBSA–Indeportes Boyacá

Professional teams
- 2009: Boyacá es Para Vivirla
- 2016–2017: RTS–Santic Racing Team

Major wins
- Pan American Time Trial Championships (2014); National Time Trial Championships (2014)
Medal record
Men's road bicycle racing
Representing Colombia
Pan American Championships
Gold medal – first place	2014 Puebla	Time trial

Pedro Antonio Herrera Moreno (born 7 October 1986), is a Colombian cyclist, who currently rides for amateur team EBSA–Indeportes Boyacá.

== Major results ==
2009
3rd Overall Vuelta a Chiriquí
2013
1st Prologue & Stage 3 Vuelta a Cundinamarca
1st Stage 4 Clásica Ciudad de Girardot
2014
1st Time trial, Pan American Road Championships
1st Time trial, National Road Championships
1st Stage 10 Vuelta al Táchira
8th Overall Vuelta Independencia Nacional
