= Cycling at the 2023 Pan American Games – Women's team pursuit =

Women's team pursuit at the 2023 Pan American Games
- Venue: Velódromo Peñalolén
- Dates: 24–25 October
- Competitors: 24 from 6 nations

Medalists
Gold medal	Devaney Collier; Fiona Majendie; Kiara Lylyk; Ruby West	Canada
Silver medal	Lizbeth Salazar; Antonieta Gaxiola; Victoria Velasco; Yareli Acevedo	Mexico
Bronze medal	Andrea Alzate; Lina Hernández; Juliana Londoño; Lina Rojas	Colombia

The women's team pursuit competition of the cycling events at the 2023 Pan American Games was held on 24 and 25 October at the Velódromo Peñalolén in Santiago, Chile.

== Records ==
Prior to this competition, the existing world and Games records were as follows:

World record	Germany	4:04.242	Izu, Japan	3 August 2021
Games record	Canada	4:19.664	Milton, Canada	17 July 2015

== Schedule ==
All times are local (UTC–3)

Date	Time	Round
24 October 2023	10:05	Qualification
24 October 2023	18:28	First round
25 October 2023	18:19	Finals

== Results ==
=== Qualification ===
All teams advanced to the first round.

Rank	Nation	Time	Behind	Notes
1	Canada; Devaney Collier; Fiona Majendie; Kiara Lylyk; Ruby West	4:28.540		
2	Mexico; Lizbeth Salazar; Antonieta Gaxiola; Victoria Velasco; Yareli Acevedo	4:30.520	+1.980	
3	Colombia; Andrea Alzate; Lina Hernández; Juliana Londoño; Lina Rojas	4:32.900	+4.360	
4	United States; Chloe Patrick; Colleen Gulick; Olivia Cummins; Shayna Powless	4:34.125	+5.585	
5	Chile; Scarlet Cortés; Camila García; Catalina Soto; Victoria Martínez	4:38.790	+10.250	
6	Venezuela; Angie González; Jalymar Rodríguez; Verónica Abreu; Wilmarys Moreno	4:51.618	+23.078	

=== First round ===
First round heats were held as follows:
Heat 1: 5th v 6th fastest
Heat 2: 2nd v 3rd fastest
Heat 3: 1st v 4th fastest

The winners of heats 2 and 3 proceeded to the gold medal race. The remaining four teams were ranked on time, from which the top two proceeded to the bronze medal race.

Heat	Rank	Nation	Time	Notes
1	1	Chile; Scarlet Cortés; Camila García; Catalina Soto; Victoria Martínez	4.33.100	
1	2	Venezuela; Angie González; Jalymar Rodríguez; Verónica Abreu; Wilmarys Moreno	4:46.841	
2	1	Mexico; Lizbeth Salazar; Antonieta Gaxiola; Victoria Velasco; Yareli Acevedo	4:24.386	QG
2	2	Colombia; Andrea Alzate; Lina Hernández; Juliana Londoño; Lina Rojas	4:27.512	QB
3	1	Canada; Devaney Collier; Fiona Majendie; Kiara Lylyk; Ruby West	4:22.246	QG
3	2	United States; Chloe Patrick; Colleen Gulick; Olivia Cummins; Shayna Powless	4:26.425	QB

=== Finals ===
Rank	Nation	Time	Behind	Notes
Gold medal final
1st place, gold medalist(s)	Canada; Devaney Collier; Fiona Majendie; Ruby West; Kiara Lylyk			
2nd place, silver medalist(s)	Mexico; Lizbeth Salazar; Antonieta Gaxiola; Yareli Acevedo; Victoria Velasco	OVL		
Bronze medal final
3rd place, bronze medalist(s)	Colombia; Andrea Alzate; Lina Hernández; Juliana Londoño; Lina Rojas	4:24.964		
4	United States; Chloe Patrick; Colleen Gulick; Olivia Cummins; Shayna Powless	4:27.139	+2.175	
