= Jaime Suaza =

Colombian cyclist

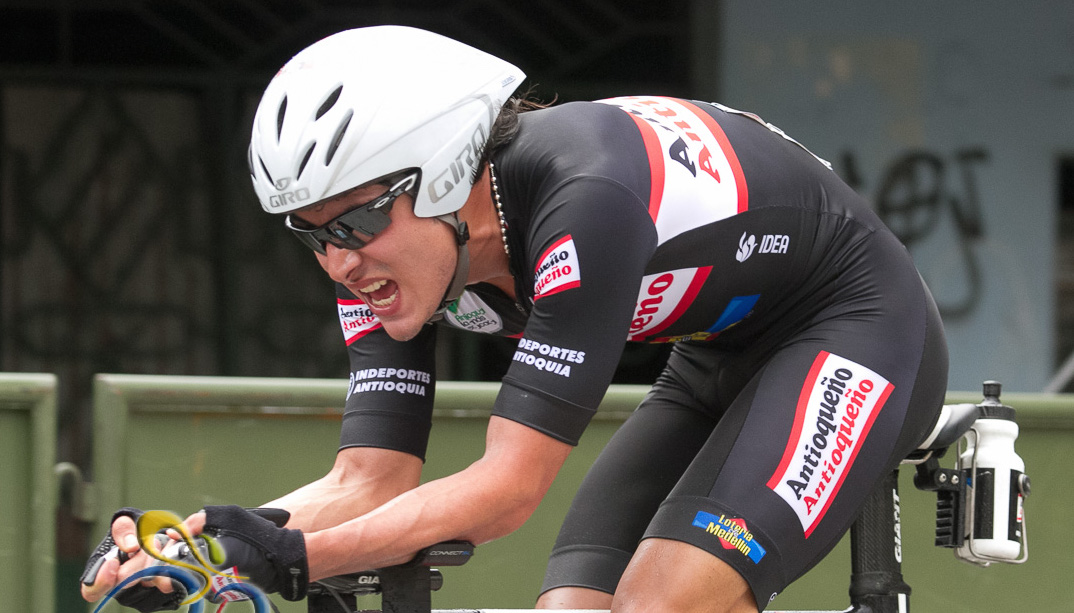
- Suaza in 2013

Personal information
- Full name: Jaime Gustavo Suaza López
- Born: 25 September 1986 (age 40)

Cycling career
- Sport: Cycling
- Current team: Retired
- Disciplines: Road; Track
- Role: Rider
- Rider type: Time trialist

Amateur teams
- 2008: GW–Shimano
- 2009–2014: Indeportes Antioquia
- 2015: GW–Shimano

Professional team
- 2016–2017: Strongman–Campagnolo–Wilier

Jaime Gustavo Suaza López (born 25 September 1986) is a Colombian former professional cyclist.

== Major results ==
2003
1st Time trial, National Junior Road Championships
2008
1st Time trial, Pan American Under-23 Road Championships
2012
3rd Time trial, National Road Championships
2013
3rd Time trial, National Road Championships
