= Cycling at the 2010 South American Games – Women's individual pursuit =

The Women's Individual Pursuit event at the 2010 South American Games was held on March 18,. The qualification was held on the morning and the finals on the evening.

== Medalists ==
| Gold | Silver | Bronze |
|---|---|---|
| María Luisa Calle; Colombia | Janildes Fernandes; Brazil | Sérika Gulumá; Colombia |

== Results ==
=== Qualification ===
| Rank | Rider | 1000m | 2000m | Final | Speed | Q |
|---|---|---|---|---|---|---|
| 1 | María Luisa Calle (COL) | 1:18.241 (3) | 2:31.832 (1) | 3:46.768 | 47.625 | QF |
| 2 | Janildes Fernandes (BRA) | 1:17.947 (2) | 2:34.288 (3) | 3:53.203 | 46.311 | QF |
| 3 | Sérika Gulumá (COL) | 1:16.075 (1) | 2:32.400 (2) | 3:53.994 | 46.155 | QB |
| 4 | Valeria Teresita Müller (ARG) | 1:22.370 (6) | 2:41.039 (5) | 3:57.234 | 45.524 | QB |
| 5 | Maria Eugenia Constante (ECU) | 1:23.043 (8) | 2:40.204 (4) | 3:59.790 | 45.039 | |
| 6 | Olga Elena Muñoz (CHI) | 1:21.980 (5) | 2:41.525 (6) | 4:03.559 | 44.342 | |
| 7 | Maria Briceno (VEN) | 1:22.739 (7) | 2:43.277 (8) | 4:05.175 | 44.050 | |
| 8 | Fernanda Souza (BRA) | 1:19.660 (4) | 2:42.821 (7) | 4:09.340 | 43.314 | |
| 9 | Katterine Adrea Cofre (CHI) | 1:23.906 (9) | 2:49.655 (9) | 4:20.399 | 41.474 | |

=== Finals ===
| Rank | Rider | 1000m | 2000m | Final | Speed |
|---|---|---|---|---|---|
| 1st place, gold medalist(s) | María Luisa Calle (COL) | 1:17.169 (1) | – | (1) | |
| 2nd place, silver medalist(s) | Janildes Fernandes (BRA) | 1:18.265 (2) | – | OVL | |
| 3rd place, bronze medalist(s) | Sérika Gulumá (COL) | 1:16.665 (1) | 2:32.685 (1) | 3:44.972 | 48.005 |
| 4 | Valeria Teresita Müller (ARG) | 1:22.117 (2) | 2:41.399 (2) | DNF | |
