= Juan Carlos López (cyclist) =

Colombian cyclist

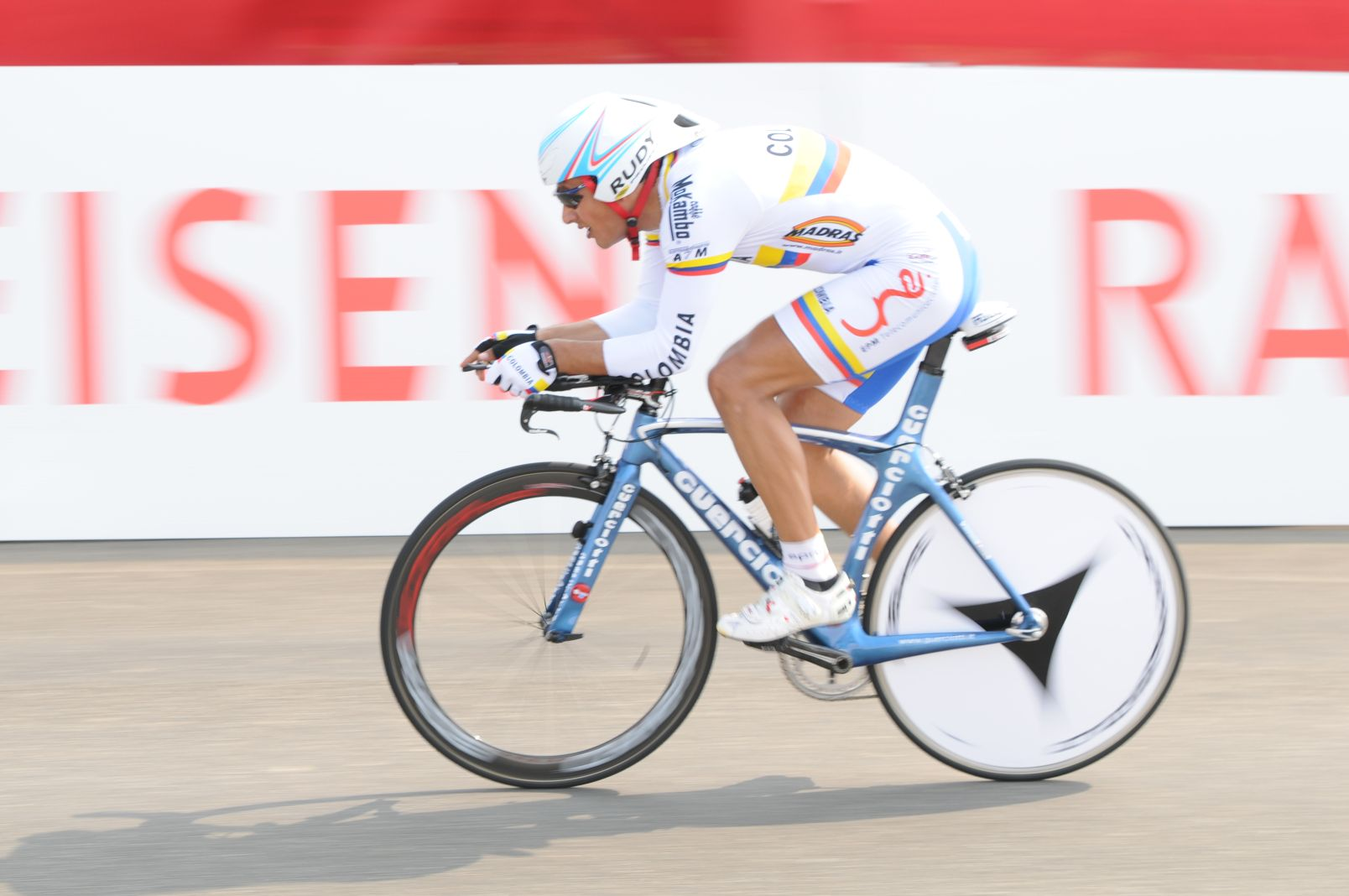
- López riding in the time trial at the 2009 UCI Road World Championships

Personal information
- Full name: Juan Carlos López Marín
- Born: 24 April 1981 (age 45) Rionegro, Colombia

Cycling career
- Sport: Cycling
- Current team: Retired
- Discipline: Road
- Role: Rider
- Rider type: Time trialist

Amateur teams
- 2002: Aguardiente Antioqueño–IDEA
- 2004–2005: Saunier–Duval amateur
- 2007–2009: UNE–Orbitel
- 2010: Indeportes Antioquia
- 2011: IDRD–Liga de Ciclismo de Bogota–Formesan

Professional teams
- 2005: Saunier Duval–Prodir (stagiaire)
- 2006: Grupo Nicolás Mateos
Medal record
Men's road bicycle racing
Representing Colombia
Pan American Championships
Gold medal – first place	2009 Hidalgo	Time trial

Juan Carlos López Marín (born 24 April 1981) is a Colombian former road cyclist. A time trial specialist, he won the 2009 Pan American Time Trial Championships.

== Major results ==
2003
1st Road race, National Under-23 Road Championships
1st Overall Vuelta de la Juventud de Colombia

1st Stages 3 & 6 (ITT)

2004
1st Overall Vuelta a Extremadura
2005
2nd Overall Vuelta a Navarra

1st Mountains classification

2nd Overall Vuelta a Palencia

1st Stage 5

2007
1st Overall Clásica de Fusagasugá
2nd Overall Clásica de Marinilla

1st Stage 2

2008
3rd Overall Clásico RCN

1st Stage 9 (ITT)

2009
1st Time trial, Pan American Road Championships
2nd Time trial, National Road Championships
2nd Overall Clásica de Fusagasugá

1st Stage 2

2010
1st Overall Clásica de Rionegro

1st Stage 2 (ITT)

1st Stage 1 (TTT) Vuelta a Colombia
2011
3rd Time trial, National Road Championships
