= Camila Valbuena =

Colombian cyclist (born 1997)

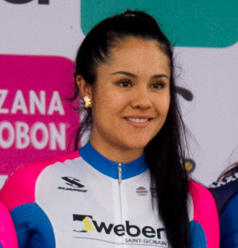

Personal information
- Full name: Camila Andrea Valbuena Roa
- Born: February 18, 1997 (age 29) Bogotá, Colombia

Cycling career
- Sport: Cycling
- Disciplines: Road cycling; Track cycling
- Role: Rider

Amateur teams
- 2016: World Cycling Centre
- 2019: Evoluc Fem Lia de Bogota

Professional team
- 2017: Weber Shimano Ladies Power
Medal record
Representing Colombia
Women's track cycling
Event	1st	2nd	3rd
World Junior Championships	1	0	0
Nations Cup stage	0	0	2
Pan American Championships	0	0	1
CAC Games	1	0	0
South American Games	1	0	0
Bolivarian Games	2	1	1
Total	5	1	4
Pan American Championships
Bronze medal – third place	2025 Asunción	Team pursuit
Central American and Caribbean Games
Gold medal – first place	2026 Santo Domingo	Team pursuit
South American Games
Gold medal – first place	2026 Santa Fe	Team pursuit
Bolivarian Games
Gold medal – first place	2017 Santa Marta	Team pursuit
Gold medal – first place	2022 Valledupar	Team pursuit
Silver medal – second place	2025 Lima-Ayacucho	Team pursuit
Bronze medal – third place	2017 Santa Marta	Individual pursuit
World Junior Championships
Gold medal – first place	2014 Gwangmyeong	Points race

Camila Andrea Valbuena Roa (born February 18, 1997, in Bogotá) is a Colombian track and road cyclist. She has previous competed with UCI Women's Team Weber Shimano Ladies Power in 2017.

She won gold in the 2014 UCI Juniors Track World Championships in the points race category. She was the Pan American junior time trial champion, and qualified for the time trial at the 2015 UCI Road World Championships. In the 2017 Bolivarian Games, she won gold in the team pursuit and bronze in the individual pursuit.

== Major results ==
2014
1st Points race, UCI Juniors Track World Championships
1st Time trial, Pan American Junior Road Championships
2015
Pan American Junior Road Championships

1st Time trial
2nd Road race

1st Time trial, National Junior Road Championships
8th Time trial, Pan American Games
2017
Bolivarian Games

1st Team pursuit
3rd Individual pursuit

6th Overall Vuelta a Colombia Femenina
2019
National Under-23 Road Championships

2nd Road race
2nd Time trial

2nd Overall Vuelta a Colombia Femenina

1st Young rider classification

10th Overall Vuelta Femenina a Guatemala
2020
3rd Time trial, National Road Championships
2021
4th Overall Vuelta Femenina a Guatemala
5th Overall Vuelta a Colombia Femenina
2022
3rd Time trial, National Road Championships
