= Daniela Lionço =

Brazilian cyclist (born 1989)

Personal information
- Full name: Daniela Cristine Lionço
- Born: 1 January 1989 (age 37) Cascavel, Brazil
- Height: 167 cm (5 ft 6 in)
- Weight: 52 kg (115 lb)

Cycling career
- Sport: Cycling
- Disciplines: Road; Track
- Role: Rider

Amateur teams
- 2008: Team System Data
- 2016: Brasil Pro Cycling
- 2019: ABEC Rio Claro

Professional teams
- 2010: ACS Chirio–Forno d'Asolo
- 2015: Servetto Footon
Medal record
Women's track cycling
Representing Brazil
Pan American Championships
Bronze medal – third place	2019 Cochabamba	Madison

Daniela Cristine Lionço (born 1 January 1989) is a Brazilian racing cyclist. She has previously ridden for UCI Women's Teams ACS Chirio–Forno d'Asolo in 2010, and Servetto Footon in 2015.

== Major results ==
2008
8th Copa América de Ciclismo
2015
1st Time trial, National Road Championships
1st Omnium, National Track Championships
1st Prova Ciclística 9 de Julho
2016
1st Individual pursuit, National Track Championships
1st Prova Ciclística 9 de Julho
1st Shimano Fest Brazil
4th Time trial, National Road Championships
Pan American Road Championships

9th Time trial
10th Road race

2019
3rd Madison, Pan American Track Championships (with Wellyda dos Santos)

== See also ==
- List of 2015 UCI Women's Teams and riders
