= Jessica Parra =

Colombian cyclist (born 1995)

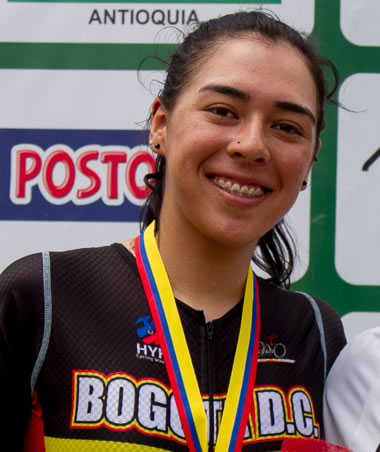
- Parra in 2016

Personal information
- Full name: Jessica Marcela Parra Rojas
- Born: 10 August 1995 (age 31) Bogotá, Colombia

Cycling career
- Sport: Cycling
- Disciplines: Road cycling; Track cycling
- Role: Rider

Amateur team
- 2017: Coldeportes–Claro

Professional teams
- 2014–2016: Vaiano Fondriest
- 2018: Servetto–Stradalli Cycle–Alurecycling
- 2020: Team Illuminate
Medal record
Representing Colombia
Women's track cycling
Event	1st	2nd	3rd
World Junior Championships	1	0	0
Nations Cup stage	0	0	1
Pan American Games	0	0	1
Pan American Championships	1	1	1
CAC Games	0	1	2
South American Games	2	0	0
Bolivarian Games	2	2	1
Total	6	4	6
Pan American Games
Bronze medal – third place	2019 Lima	Team pursuit
Pan American Championships
Gold medal – first place	2021 Lima	Team pursuit
Silver medal – second place	2021 Lima	Madison
Bronze medal – third place	2021 Lima	Individual pursuit
Central American and Caribbean Games
Silver medal – second place	2018 Barranquilla	Team pursuit
Bronze medal – third place	2014 Veracruz	Team pursuit
Bronze medal – third place	2018 Barranquilla	Madison
South American Games
Gold medal – first place	2018 Cochabamba	Madison
Gold medal – first place	2018 Cochabamba	Team pursuit
Bolivarian Games
Gold medal – first place	2017 Santa Marta	Points race
Gold medal – first place	2017 Santa Marta	Team pursuit
Silver medal – second place	2013 Trujillo	Team pursuit
Silver medal – second place	2017 Santa Marta	Individual pursuit
Bronze medal – third place	2013 Trujillo	Individual pursuit
World Junior Championships
Gold medal – first place	2013 Glasgow	Scratch
Women's road cycling
Event	1st	2nd	3rd
Pan American Championships	0	0	1
Total	0	0	1
Pan American Championships
Bronze medal – third place	2017 Santo Domingo	Under-23 time trial

Jessica Marcela Parra Rojas (born 10 August 1995) is a Colombian professional racing cyclist, who most recently rode for UCI Women's Continental Team Team Illuminate.

== Major results ==
2014
3rd Team pursuit, Central American and Caribbean Games (with Valentina Paniagua, Milena Salcedo and Lorena Vargas)

== See also ==
- List of 2015 UCI Women's Teams and riders
