= Sérika Gulumá =

Colombian cyclist (born 1990)

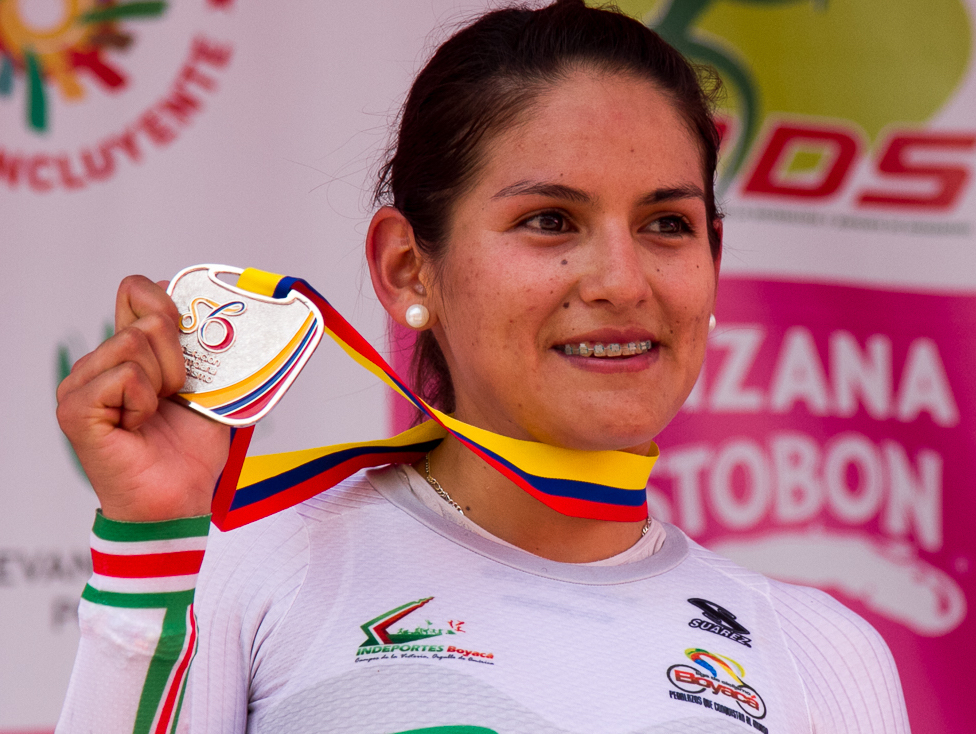
- Gulumá in 2016

Personal information
- Full name: Sérika Mitchell Gulumá Ortiz
- Born: 16 July 1990 (age 36) Puerto Rico, Colombia

Cycling career
- Sport: Cycling
- Current team: Colnago CM Team
- Discipline: Road
- Role: Rider

Amateur teams
- 2017: Boyaca (guest)
- 2018–2020: Boyaca Raza De Campeones
- 2021–: Colnago CM Team

Professional team
- 2013–2016: Vaiano Fondriest
Medal record
Representing Colombia
Women's track cycling
Pan American Games
Bronze medal – third place	2011 Guadalajara	Team pursuit
Pan American Championships
Silver medal – second place	2009 Mexico City	Team pursuit
Silver medal – second place	2013 Mexico City	Team pursuit
Bronze medal – third place	2011 Medellín	Team pursuit
Central American and Caribbean Games
Gold medal – first place	2010 Mayagüez	Team pursuit
Silver medal – second place	2010 Mayagüez	Omnium
Silver medal – second place	2010 Mayagüez	Points race
Silver medal – second place	2018 Barranquilla	Team pursuit
Silver medal – second place	2023 San Salvador	Team pursuit
Women's road cycling
Pan American Championships
Gold medal – first place	2016 San Cristóbal	Time trial
Silver medal – second place	2014 Puebla	Time trial
Bronze medal – third place	2013 Zacatecas	Time trial
Central American and Caribbean Games
Silver medal – second place	2014 Veracruz	Time trial
Bronze medal – third place	2018 Barranquilla	Time trial

Sérika Mitchell Gulumá Ortiz (born 16 July 1990) is a Colombian racing cyclist, who rides for Colombian amateur team Colnago CM Team. She competed in the 2013 UCI women's team time trial in Florence.

== Major results ==
=== Road ===
2008
2nd Time trial, Pan American Road Championships
2009
3rd Time trial, National Road Championships
2010
1st Overall Vuelta Femenino del Porvenir

1st Stages 1, 2, 4 (ITT) & 5

3rd Overall Clasica Alcaldia de Anapoima
3rd Overall Vuelta a Cundinamarca
4th Road race, South American Games
4th Road race, National Road Championships
2011
1st Overall Tour Femenino de Colombia

1st Stage 2

1st Overall Vuelta Femenino del Porvenir

1st Stage 2

2nd Overall Vuelta a Cundinamarca
3rd Team pursuit, Pan American Games (with María Luisa Calle and Lorena Vargas)
National Road Championships

4th Road race
4th Time trial

5th Overall Clasica Alcaldia de Anapoima
2012
3rd Overall Tour Femenino de Colombia

1st Stages 1, 3 & 4

3rd Overall Vuelta Femenino del Porvenir

1st Stages 1, 3 (ITT) & 4

9th Overall Vuelta a Cundinamarca
9th Herman Miller Grand Cycling Classic
2013
National Road Championships

1st Time trial
5th Road race

3rd Time trial, Pan American Road Championships
3rd Overall Vuelta a El Salvador
5th Grand Prix de Oriente
10th Grand Prix GSB
2014
1st Time trial, National Road Championships
2nd Time trial, Central American and Caribbean Games
2nd Time trial, Pan American Road Championships
4th Overall Vuelta Internacional Femenina a Costa Rica
4th Overall Tour Femenino de San Luis
9th Giro dell'Emilia Internazionale Donne Elite
2015
National Road Championships

2nd Time trial
6th Road race

2nd Overall Vuelta al Valle del Cauca
3rd Overall Vuelta Femenino del Porvenir
6th Giro del Trentino Alto Adige-Südtirol
2016
1st Road race, Pan American Road Championships
1st Overall Vuelta Al Tolima

1st Stages 2 & 3

National Road Championships

2nd Time trial
8th Road race

2nd Overall Clasica Alcaldia de Anapoima
2017
5th Overall Vuelta a Boyacá
5th Overall Vuelta Femenino del Porvenir
2018
1st Time trial, National Road Championships
1st Stage 4 Vuelta a Colombia Femenina
South American Games

2nd Time trial
3rd Road race

3rd Time trial, Central American and Caribbean Games
2019
1st Time trial, National Road Championships
1st Stage 3 Vuelta a Colombia Femenina
2021
1st Time trial, National Road Championships
5th Time trial, Pan American Road Championships
2022
2nd Time trial, Bolivarian Games
4th Overall Vuelta Internacional Femenina a Costa Rica

1st Points classification

=== Track ===
2010
Central American and Caribbean Games

1st Team pursuit (with María Luisa Calle and Leidy Muñoz)
2nd Points race
2nd Omnium

3rd Individual pursuit, South American Games
2011
3rd Team pursuit, Pan American Games (with María Luisa Calle and Lorena Vargas)
3rd Team pursuit, Pan American Track Championships
2013
2nd Team pursuit, Pan American Track Championships (with María Luisa Calle and Milena Salcedo)
2018
1st Team pursuit, South American Games
2nd Team pursuit, Central American and Caribbean Games
2nd Points race, National Track Championships
2022
3rd Team pursuit, UCI Track Cycling Nations Cup, Cali
