= 2015 UnitedHealthcare season =

UnitedHealthcare
- 2015 season
- UCI code: UHC
- Status: UCI Professional Continental
- Manager: Thierry Attias
- Main sponsor(s): UnitedHealth Group
- Based: United States
- Bicycles: Wilier Triestina

Season victories
- One-day races: 1
- Stage race overall: 1
- Stage race stages: 4

The 2015 season for the UnitedHealthcare cycling team began in January at the Tour de San Luis. The team participated in UCI Continental Circuits and UCI World Tour events when given a wildcard invitation.

== 2015 roster ==
| Rider | Date of birth |
|---|---|
| Carlos Alzate (COL) | March 23, 1983 (age 41) |
| Alessandro Bazzana (ITA) | July 16, 1984 (age 40) |
| Isaac Bolívar (COL) | May 9, 1991 (age 33) |
| Janez Brajkovič (SLO) | December 18, 1983 (age 41) |
| Marco Canola (ITA) | December 26, 1988 (age 36) |
| Hilton Clarke (AUS) | July 11, 1979 (age 45) |
| Jonathan Clarke (AUS) | December 18, 1984 (age 40) |
| Lucas Euser (USA) | December 5, 1983 (age 41) |
| Robert Förster (GER) | January 27, 1978 (age 47) |
| Davide Frattini (ITA) | August 6, 1978 (age 46) |
| Ken Hanson (USA) | April 14, 1982 (age 42) |

| Rider | Date of birth |
|---|---|
| Adrian Hegyvary (USA) | January 15, 1984 (age 41) |
| Christopher Jones (USA) | August 6, 1979 (age 45) |
| Luke Keough (USA) | August 10, 1991 (age 33) |
| Karl Menzies (AUS) | June 17, 1977 (age 47) |
| John Murphy (USA) | December 15, 1984 (age 40) |
| Tanner Putt (USA) | April 21, 1992 (age 32) |
| Daniele Ratto (ITA) | October 5, 1989 (age 35) |
| Kiel Reijnen (USA) | June 1, 1986 (age 38) |
| Daniel Summerhill (USA) | January 28, 1989 (age 36) |
| Bradley White (USA) | January 15, 1982 (age 43) |
| Federico Zurlo (ITA) | February 25, 1994 (age 31) |

Riders who joined the team for the 2015 season

| Rider | 2014 team |
|---|---|
| Janez Brajkovič | Astana |
| Marco Canola | Bardiani–CSF |
| Tanner Putt | neo-pro (Bissell Development) |
| Daniele Ratto | Cannondale |
| Federico Zurlo | neo-pro (Zalf-Euromobil) |

Riders who left the team during or after the 2014 season

| Rider | 2015 team |
|---|---|
| Benjamin Day | Retired |
| Marc de Maar | Team Roompot |
| Aldo Ino Ilešič | Vorarlberg |
| Martyn Irvine | Madison Genesis |
| Jeff Louder | Retired |
| Martijn Maaskant | Retired |

== Season victories ==
| Date | Race | Competition | Rider | Country | Location |
|---|---|---|---|---|---|
| 7 February | Dubai Tour, Sprints classification | UCI Asia Tour | Alessandro Bazzana (ITA) | United Arab Emirates | |
| 15 March | Tour de Langkawi, Mountains classification | UCI Asia Tour | Kiel Reijnen (USA) | Malaysia | |
| 29 March | Critérium International, Mountains classification | UCI Europe Tour | Marco Canola (ITA) | France | |
| 24 April | Joe Martin Stage Race, Stage 2 | UCI America Tour | John Murphy (USA) | United States | Fayetteville |
| 25 April | Joe Martin Stage Race, Stage 3 | UCI America Tour | John Murphy (USA) | United States | Prairie Grove |
| 26 April | Joe Martin Stage Race, Overall | UCI America Tour | John Murphy (USA) | United States | |
| 26 April | Joe Martin Stage Race, Points classification | UCI America Tour | John Murphy (USA) | United States | |
| 3 August | Tour of Utah, Stage 1 | UCI America Tour | Kiel Reijnen (USA) | United States | Logan |
| 19 August | USA Pro Cycling Challenge, Stage 3 | UCI America Tour | Kiel Reijnen (USA) | United States | Aspen |
| 12 September | The Reading 120 | UCI America Tour | Daniel Summerhill (USA) | United States | Reading |
