= Victoria Velasco =

Mexican cyclist

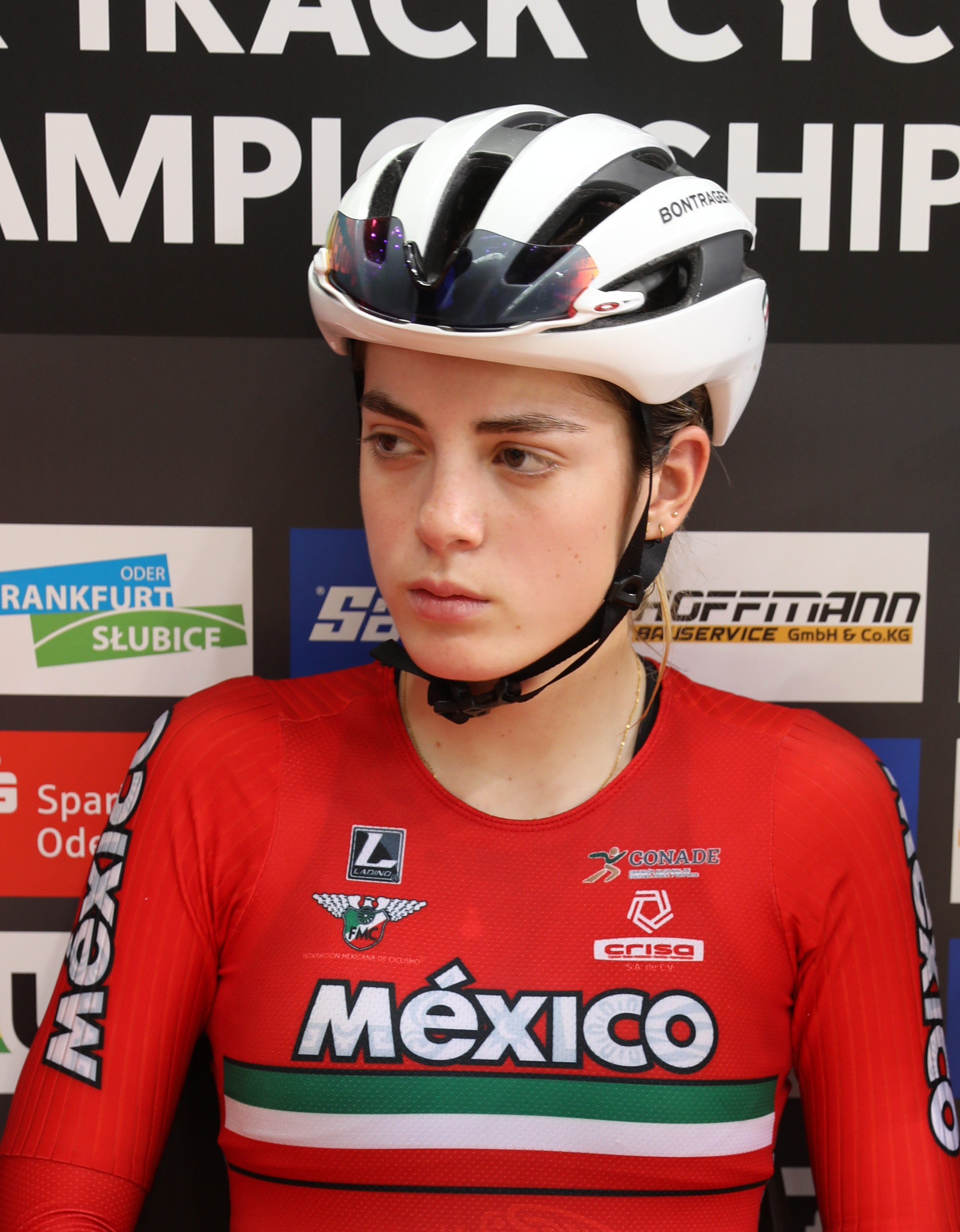
- Velasco in 2019

Personal information
- Full name: Victoria Velasco Fuentes
- Born: 5 August 2002 (age 24) Monterrey, Nuevo León, México

Cycling career
- Sport: Cycling
- Disciplines: Track; Road
- Role: Rider
Medal record
Women's track cycling
Representing Mexico
Pan American Games
Silver medal – second place	2023 Santiago	Team pursuit
Pan American Championships
Gold medal – first place	2021 Lima	Madison
Gold medal – first place	2023 San Juan	Omnium
Silver medal – second place	2021 Lima	Scratch race
Silver medal – second place	2021 Lima	Team Pursuit
Silver medal – second place	2022 Lima	Team pursuit
Silver medal – second place	2023 San Juan	Team pursuit
Silver medal – second place	2024 Carson	Points race
Silver medal – second place	2021 Lima	Omnium
Bronze medal – third place	2022 Lima	Omnium
Bronze medal – third place	2024 Carson	Team pursuit
Central American and Caribbean Games
Gold medal – first place	2023 San Salvador	Omnium
Gold medal – first place	2023 San Salvador	Team pursuit
Junior Pan American Games
Gold medal – first place	2021 Cali-Valle	Madison
Silver medal – second place	2021 Cali-Valle	Team pursuit

Victoria Velasco Fuentes (Note: In this Spanish name, the first or paternal surname is Velasco and the second or maternal family name is Fuentes.) (born 5 August 2002) is a Mexican cyclist. She won a silver medal for Mexico in the team pursuit at the 2023 Pan American Games and represented Mexico at the 2024 Olympic Games. She is a multiple-time medalist at the Pan American Track Cycling Championships.

== Career ==
In June 2021, Velasco won the madison with Yareli Acevedo at the Pan American Track Cycling Championships in Lima, Peru. Prior to that, on 29 May 2021, Velasco also won the omnium at the Mexican Olympic trials in Guadalajara. Velasco travelled to compete at the delayed 2020 Olympic Games in Tokyo, Japan. However, a registration error by the Mexican federation made her and Acevedo ineligible to compete at the Games in August 2021, and was discovered just days before the opening ceremony chasing them to withdraw. Velasco won the bronze medal at the 2022 Pan American Track Cycling Championships in Lima, Peru in August 2022, in the Omnium.

Velasco was a silver medalist in the team pursuit alongside Acevedo, Antonieta Gaxiola and Lizbeth Salazar at the 2023 Pan American Games in Santiago, Chile. Velasco placed ninth overall in the Omnium at the 2023 UCI Track Cycling Nations Cup and also had top-ten finishes at the events in Canada and Hong Kong in the 2024 UCI Track Cycling Nations Cup. She qualified to compete for Mexico in the omnium at the 2024 Olympic Games in Paris, France for a belated Olympic debut.

== Personal life ==
Velasco was born in Monterrey. From a family of cyclists, her brother and sister also competed in cycling events.
