= Cycling at the 2023 Central American and Caribbean Games =

- Venue: Various
- Location: (El Salvador) San Salvador
- Dates: 25 June – 7 July

The cycling competition at the 2023 Central American and Caribbean Games will be held from 25 June to 7 July. The BMX events are going to held at Ecoparque El Espino, the mountain biking events are going to be held at the Ecoparque El Espino, the road cycling events are going to be held at Comalapa–Usulután/Ave. Jerusalem and the track cycling events are going to be held at the Velódromo Nacional.

== Medal summary ==
=== Road events ===
Event	Gold	Silver	Bronze
Men's road race	Orluis Aular (VEN)	Miguel Ángel López (COL)	Dorian Monterroso (CCS)
Women's road race	Arlenis Sierra (CUB)	Lilibeth Chacón (VEN)	Gabriela Soto (CCS)
Men's time trial	Miguel Ángel López (COL)	Walter Vargas (COL)	Conor White (BER)
Women's time trial	Arlenis Sierra (CUB)	Diana Peñuela (COL)	Caitlin Conyers (BER)

=== Track events ===
Event	Gold	Silver	Bronze
Men's sprint	Nicholas Paul (TTO)	Kwesi Browne (TTO)	Kevin Quintero (COL)
Women's sprint	Daniela Gaxiola (MEX)	Martha Bayona (COL)	Yuli Verdugo (MEX)
Men's team sprint	Mexico; Jafet Lopez; Juan Ruiz; Edgar Verdugo	Colombia; Carlos Echeverri; Cristian Ortega; Kevin Quintero	Trinidad and Tobago; Kwesi Browne; Zion Pulido; Nicholas Paul
Women's team sprint	Mexico; Jessica Salazar; Yuli Verdugo; Daniela Gaxiola	Colombia; Yarli Mosquera; Valeria Cardozo; Martha Bayona	Cuba; Ana Bello; Thalia Diaz; Sandra Cabrera
Men's keirin	Juan Ruiz (MEX)	Kevin Quintero (COL)	Cristian Ortega (COL)
Women's keirin	Martha Bayona (COL)	Valeria Cardozo (COL)	Yuli Verdugo (MEX)
Men's team pursuit	Colombia (COL); Anderson Arboleda; Brayan Sánchez; Nelson Soto; Juan Esteban Arango	Mexico (MEX); Tomas Aguirre; Sebastian Ruiz; Fernando Nava; Ignacio Prado	Venezuela (VEN); Franklin Chacón; Cesar Sanabria; Ángel Pulgar; Edwin Torres
Women's team pursuit	Mexico (MEX); Antonieta Gaxiola; Yareli Acevedo; Victoria Velasco; Lizbeth Salazar	Colombia (COL); Andrea Alzate; Elizabeth Castaño; Lina Rojas; Sérika Gulumá	Venezuela (VEN); Wilmarys Moreno; Angie González; Lilibeth Chacón; Veronica Abreu
Men's madison	Mexico (MEX); Fernando Nava; Ignacio Prado	Colombia (COL); Brayan Sánchez; Juan Esteban Arango	Cuba (CUB); Alejandro Parra; Leandro Marcos
Women's madison	Mexico (MEX); Antonieta Gaxiola; Lizbeth Salazar	Colombia (COL); Elizabeth Castaño; Lina Rojas	Venezuela (VEN); Angie González; Veronica Abreu
Men's omnium	Ricardo Peña (MEX)	Juan Esteban Arango (COL)	Alejandro Parra (CUB)
Women's omnium	Victoria Velasco (MEX)	Lina Rojas (COL)	Amber Joseph (BAR)

=== Mountain events ===
Event	Gold	Silver	Bronze
Men's cross country	Jhonnatan Botero Villegas (COL)	Gerardo Ulloa (MEX)	Georwill Pérez (PUR)
Women's cross country	Daniela Campuzano (MEX)	Adriana Rojas (CRC)	Ana María Roa (COL)

=== BMX events ===
Event	Gold	Silver	Bronze
Men's BMX	Diego Arboleda (COL)	Jholman Sivira (VEN)	Edgar Rodarte (MEX)
Women's BMX	Mariana Pajón (COL)	Gabriela Bolle (COL)	Shanayah Howell (ARU)

== Medal table ==
* Host nation (El Salvador)

Rank	Nation	Gold	Silver	Bronze	Total
1	Mexico (MEX)	10	2	3	15
2	Colombia (COL)	6	14	3	23
3	Cuba (CUB)	2	0	3	5
4	Venezuela (VEN)	1	2	3	6
5	Trinidad and Tobago (TTO)	1	1	1	3
6	Costa Rica (CRC)	0	1	0	1
7	Bermuda (BER)	0	0	2	2
7	Centro Caribe Sports (CCS)	0	0	2	2
9	Aruba (ARU)	0	0	1	1
9	Barbados (BAR)	0	0	1	1
9	Puerto Rico (PUR)	0	0	1	1
Totals (11 entries)		20	20	20	60
