= Jonathan Monsalve =

Venezuelan road cyclist

Personal information
- Full name: Jonathan Alejandro Monsalve Pertsinidis
- Born: 28 June 1989 (age 37) Maracaibo, Zulia, Venezuela
- Height: 176 cm (5 ft 9 in)
- Weight: 62 kg (137 lb)

Cycling career
- Sport: Cycling
- Current team: Qinghai Tianyoude Hotel Cycling Team
- Discipline: Road
- Role: Rider
- Rider type: Climber

Amateur teams
- 2008–2009: Hussein Sport Gobierno Barinas
- 2010: G.S. Mastromarco
- 2016: JHS Aves

Professional teams
- 2011–2012: Androni Giocattoli
- 2013–2015: Vini Fantini–Selle Italia
- 2017–2019: Qinghai Tianyoude Cycling Team
- 2023–: Tianyoude Hotel Cycling Team
Medal record
Men's road bicycle racing
Representing Venezuela
Pan American Championships
Bronze medal – third place	2016 San Cristóbal	Road race

Jonathan Alejandro Monsalve Pertsinidis (born 28 June 1989) is a Venezuelan road cyclist, who currently rides for UCI Continental team Qinghai Tianyoude Hotel Cycling Team. He was suspended from the sport after testing positive for anabolic–androgenic steroids (AAS) from July 2019 to July 2023. He is the younger brother of fellow racing cyclist Ralph Monsalve.

== Major results ==
2008
10th Overall Vuelta a Venezuela
2009
1st Road race, National Under-23 Road Championships
2nd Coppa Colli Briantei
3rd Overall Vuelta al Táchira

1st Points classification
1st Young rider classification
1st Combination classification
1st Stages 3 & 12

9th Trofeo Banca Popolare di Vicenza
2010
1st Road race, National Under-23 Road Championships
1st Stage 8 Girobio
2nd Overall Giro della Valle d'Aosta

1st Stage 2

4th Trofeo Franco Balestra
5th Gran Premio della Liberazione
8th Overall Vuelta al Táchira

1st Stage 7

8th Trofeo Banca Popolare di Vicenza
2011
1st Overall Tour de Langkawi

1st Mountains classification
1st Stage 5

2012
7th Trofeo Matteotti
8th Road race, Pan American Road Championships
9th Circuito de Getxo
10th Gran Premio Industria e Commercio di Prato
2013
9th Overall Vuelta a Venezuela
2014
1st Mountains classification Giro del Trentino
9th Overall Vuelta a Venezuela

1st Stage 3

2015
1st Stage 10 Vuelta al Táchira
2016
1st Overall Vuelta a Venezuela

1st Points classification
1st Stage 2

3rd Road race, Pan American Road Championships
5th Overall Tour du Maroc
9th Overall Vuelta al Táchira
2017
1st Overall Tour of Qinghai Lake
1st Stage 1 Vuelta a Venezuela
3rd Overall Tour de Singkarak

1st Stage 5

4th Overall Vuelta al Táchira

1st Points classification
1st Stage 3

2018
1st Stage 10 Vuelta al Táchira
9th Overall Tour of Qinghai Lake
2019
1st Stage 4 Vuelta al Táchira
~~8th Overall Tour of Qinghai Lake~~

=== Grand Tour general classification results timeline ===
Grand Tour	2014	2015
Giro d'Italia	66	30
Tour de France	—	—
Vuelta a España	—	—
