= Colombian National Time Trial Championships =

National road cycling championship in Colombia

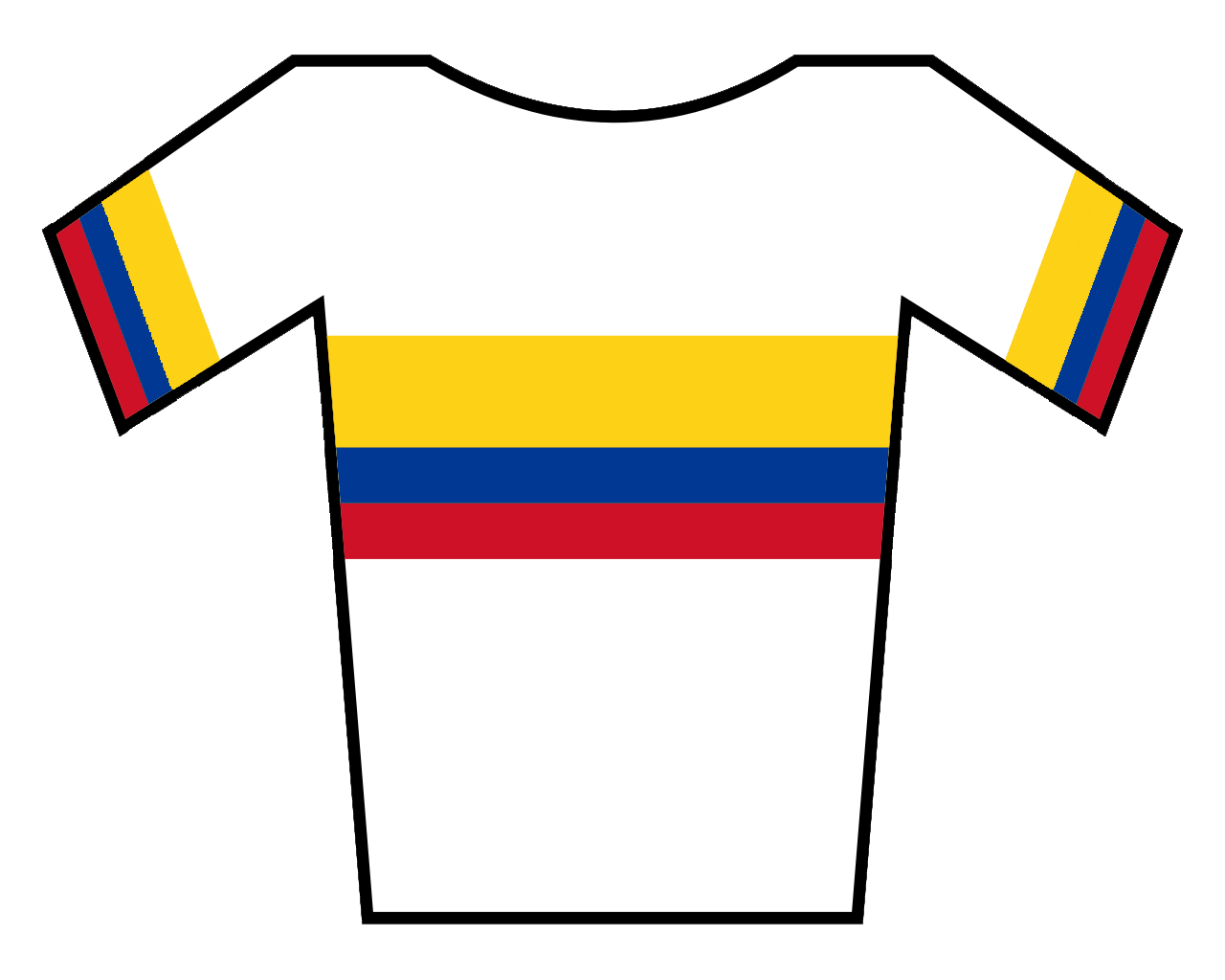

The Colombian National Time Trial Championship is a road bicycle race that takes place inside the Colombian National Cycling Championship, and decides the best cyclist in this type of race. The first edition took place in 1999. The first winner of the time trial championship was Marlon Pérez. Israel Ochoa holds the record for the most wins in the men's championship with 3, Daniel Martínez is the current champion.

== Multiple winners ==
Wins	Name	Years
4	Daniel Martínez	2019, 2020, 2022, 2024
3	Marlon Pérez	1996, 1999, 2001
3	Israel Ochoa	2000, 2004, 2008
3	Walter Vargas	2016, 2021, 2023
2	Santiago Botero	2007, 2009
2	Iván Casas	2011, 2012
2	Carlos Ospina	2010, 2013
2	Egan Bernal	2018, 2025

== Men ==
=== Elite ===
Year	Gold	Silver	Bronze
1999	Marlon Pérez	Javier Zapata	Jairo Hernández
2000	Israel Ochoa	Álvaro Lozano	Raúl Montaña
2001	Marlon Pérez	Johnny Leal	Vladimir González
2002	Johnny Leal	Marlon Pérez	José Serpa
2003	Heberth Gutiérrez	José Serpa	Israel Ochoa
2004	Israel Ochoa	Libardo Niño	Jairo Hernández
2005	Iván Parra	Javier Zapata	José Serpa
2006	Libardo Niño	José Serpa	Mauricio Neiza
2007	Santiago Botero	Rigoberto Urán	Israel Ochoa
2008	Israel Ochoa	Iván Parra	Fabio Duarte
2009	Santiago Botero	Juan Carlos López	Javier Zapata
2010	Carlos Ospina	Rafael Infantino	Víctor Hugo Peña
2011	Iván Casas	Wilson Marentes	Juan Carlos López
2012	Iván Casas	Marlon Pérez	Jaime Suaza
2013	Carlos Ospina	Iván Casas	Jaime Suaza
2014	Pedro Herrera	Omar Mendoza	Víctor Hugo Peña
2015	Rigoberto Urán	Rafael Infantino	Hernando Bohórquez
2016	Walter Vargas	Brayan Ramírez	Juan Pablo Rendón
2017	Jarlinson Pantano	Rodrigo Contreras	Walter Vargas
2018	Egan Bernal	Daniel Martínez	Walter Vargas
2019	Daniel Martínez	Miguel Ángel López	Egan Bernal
2020	Daniel Martínez	Nairo Quintana	Egan Bernal
2021	Walter Vargas	Diego Camargo	Andrés Ardila
2022	Daniel Martínez	Esteban Chaves	Diego Camargo
2023	Walter Vargas	Rodrigo Contreras	Diego Camargo
2024	Daniel Martínez	Brandon Rivera	Rodrigo Contreras
2025	Egan Bernal	Walter Vargas	Brandon Rivera

=== U23 ===
Year	Gold	Silver	Bronze
2003	Julián Rodas	Andrés Rodríguez	Mauricio Neiza
2004			
2005	Dalivier Ospina		
2006	Fabio Duarte	Edwin Parra	Wilson Marentes
2007	Wilson Marentes	Camilo Suárez	Sergio Henao
2008			
2009	Nairo Quintana	Sebastián Salazar	Michael Rodríguez
2010	Félix Barón	Winner Anacona	Isaac Bolívar
2011	Brayan Ramírez	Isaac Bolivar	Argiro Ospina
2012			
2013	Isaac Bolivar	Félix Barón	Hernando Bohórquez
2014	Carlos Ramírez	Rodrigo Contreras	Brayan Ramírez
2015			
2016	Carlos Ramírez	Eduardo Estrada	Miguel Eduardo Flórez
2019	Harold Tejada	Jhojan García	Santiago Ordoñez
2020	Adrián Bustamante	Adrian Enrique Vargas	Marlon David Herrera
2021	Victor Ocampo	Anderson Arboleda	Rafael Pineda
2022	Juan Manuel Barbosa Nader	Johan Fernando Porras	David Santiago Mesa

== Women ==
=== Elite ===
Year	Gold	Silver	Bronze
2006	Monica Méndez	Diana Agudelo	Laura Lozano
2007	María Luisa Calle	Monica Méndez	Laura Lozano
2008	Paola Madriñán	Lorena Vargas	María Luisa Calle
2009	Paola Madriñán	Lorena Vargas	Sérika Gulumá
2010	Paola Madriñán	Luz Adriana Tovar	Diana Agudelo
2011	María Luisa Calle	Lorena Vargas	Laura Lozano
2012	María Luisa Calle	Laura Lozano	Luz Adriana Tovar
2013	Sérika Gulumá	Luz Adriana Tovar	Lorena Vargas
2014	Sérika Gulumá	María Luisa Calle	Andreina Rivera
2015	Ana Sanabria	Sérika Gulumá	Laura Buriticá
2016	Ana Sanabria	Sérika Gulumá	Luz Adriana Tovar
2017	Ana Sanabria	Luz Adriana Tovar	Laura Lozano
2019	Sérika Gulumá	Ana Sanabria	Estefanía Herrera
2020	Ana Sanabria	Diana Peñuela	Camila Valbuena
2021	Sérika Gulumá	Ana Sanabria	Ana Fagua
2022	Lina Hernández	Tatiana Dueñas	Camila Valbuena
2023	Lina Hernández	Diana Peñuela	Cristina Sanabria
2024	Diana Peñuela	Karen Villamizar	Cristina Sanabria
