= Anderson Timoteo Paredes =

Venezuelan racing cyclist

Anderson Paredes
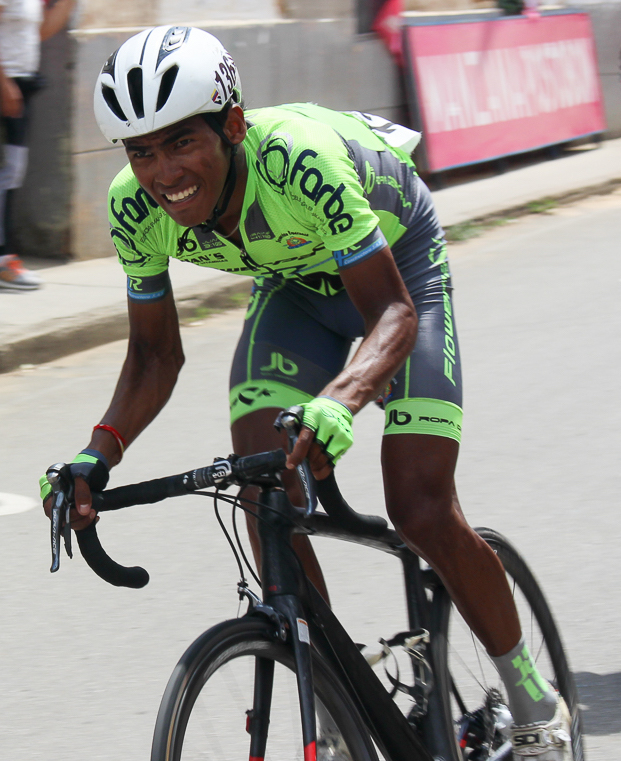
- Paredes at the 2016 Clásico RCN

Personal information
- Full name: Anderson Timoteo Paredes López
- Born: 20 March 1995 (age 31) Puerto Ayacucho, Venezuela

Cycling career
- Sport: Cycling
- Current team: Ángeles Hernandez–Orgullo Andino–Distribuidora Rairos
- Discipline: Road
- Role: Rider

Amateur teams
- 2014–2015: Gobernación de Yaracuy
- 2016: Gobierno de Yaracuy–Cavebici
- 2017: JB Ropa Deportiva
- 2017: EC Cartucho.es–Magro
- 2018: Banco Bicentenario–Gobierno de Yaracuy
- 2022–: Ángeles Hernandez–Orgullo Andino–Distribuidora Rairos

Professional teams
- 2018–2019: Team Ecuador
- 2020–2021: Best PC Ecuador

Anderson Timoteo Paredes López (born 20 March 1995 in Puerto Ayacucho) is a Venezuelan cyclist, who rides for Venezuelan amateur team Ángeles Hernandez–Orgullo Andino–Distribuidora Rairos.

== Major results ==
2013
National Junior Road Championships

1st Time trial
2nd Road race

2015
1st Young rider classification Vuelta a la Independencia Nacional
2nd Overall Vuelta a Trujillo
National Road Championships

3rd Under-23 time trial
6th Time trial

6th Overall Vuelta a Venezuela
2016
National Road Championships

1st Under-23 road race
1st Under-23 time trial
3rd Time trial
5th Road race

2nd Overall Vuelta a Trujillo

1st Stage 5

7th Overall Vuelta a Venezuela

1st Young rider classification

10th Road race, Pan American Under-23 Road Championships
2017
National Road Championships

1st Under-23 road race
2nd Under-23 time trial
3rd Road race
6th Time trial

2nd Road race, Bolivarian Games
2nd Overall Vuelta a Venezuela

1st Young rider classification

3rd Overall Vuelta a la Independencia Nacional

1st Young rider classification

2018
3rd Overall Vuelta a Venezuela
5th Time trial, South American Games
2019
6th Overall Vuelta al Táchira
7th Overall Vuelta a Venezuela
2020
5th Overall Vuelta al Ecuador
2021
Vuelta al Táchira

1st Mountains classification
1st Stage 6

2nd Overall Vuelta al Ecuador
2022
10th Overall Vuelta al Táchira
