= Félix Barón =

Colombian cyclist (born 1991)

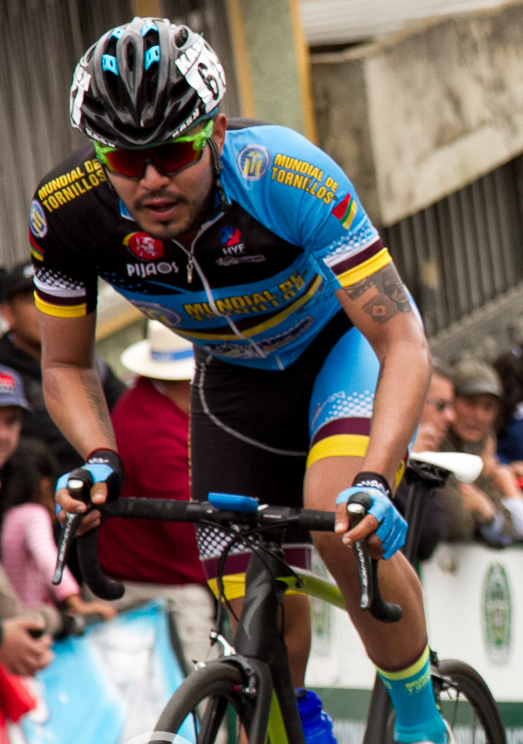
- Félix Barón in 2016

Personal information
- Full name: Félix Alejandro Barón Castillo
- Born: 7 November 1991 (age 34)

Cycling career
- Sport: Cycling
- Current team: Team Illuminate
- Disciplines: Road; Track
- Role: Rider

Amateur teams
- 2013–2014: Formesan–Bogotá Humana
- 2015: General Store Bottoli Zardini
- 2016: Mundial de Tornillos–Formesan–Pijaos Web
- 2017: Supergiros

Professional teams
- 2012: Coldeportes–Comcel
- 2015: Colombia (stagiaire)
- 2018–: Team Illuminate

Félix Alejandro Barón Castillo (born 7 November 1991) is a Colombian road and track cyclist, who currently rides for UCI Continental team Team Illuminate. He competed in the individual pursuit event at the 2011 UCI Track Cycling World Championships.

== Major results ==
2008
Pan American Junior Road Championships

1st Road race
2nd Time trial

2010
1st Time trial, National Under-23 Road Championships
1st Stage 1 Vuelta al Tolima
2013
2nd Time trial, National Under-23 Road Championships
Pan American Under-23 Road Championships

3rd Road race
6th Time trial

2018
10th Overall Tour of Thailand
