= Carlos Ramírez (road cyclist) =

Colombian cyclist

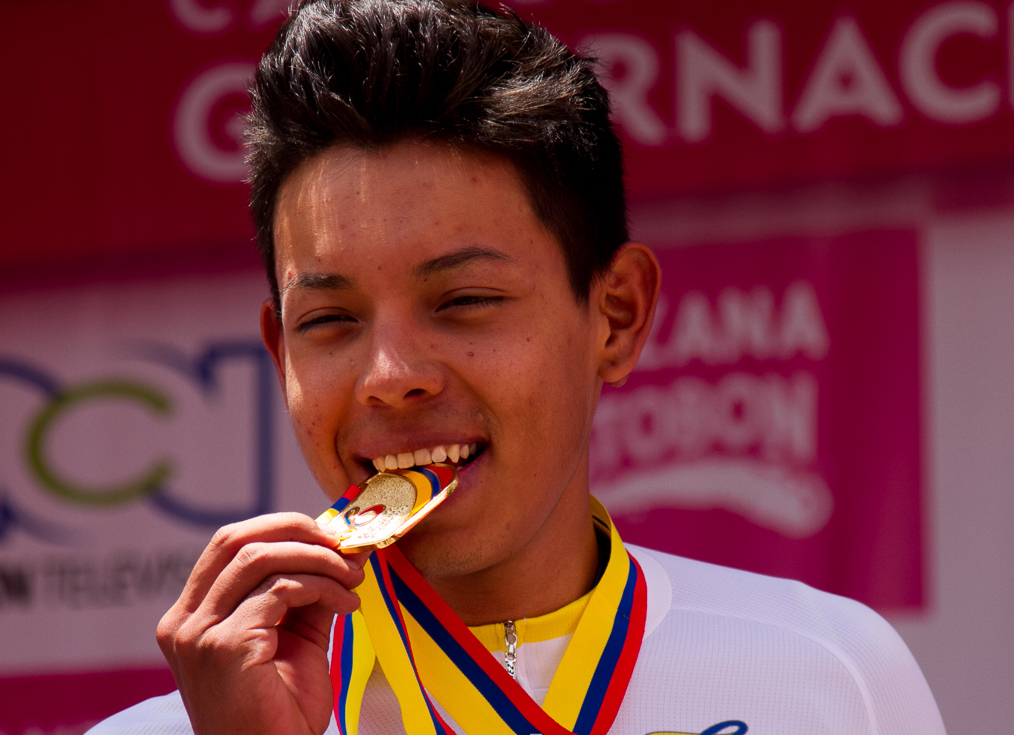
- Ramírez in 2016

Personal information
- Full name: Carlos Mario Ramírez Botero
- Born: October 26, 1994 (age 31) Manizales, Colombia

Cycling career
- Sport: Cycling
- Discipline: Road
- Role: Rider

Amateur team
- 2014: Aguardiente Antioqueño–Lotería de Medellín–IDEA

Professional teams
- 2015: Colombia
- 2016–2017: Movistar Team América
- 2018: GW–Shimano
- 2019: EPM

Carlos Mario Ramírez Botero (born October 26, 1994, in Manizales) is a Colombian cyclist, who last rode for UCI Continental team EPM.

== Major results ==
2014
1st Time trial, National Under-23 Road Championships
Pan American Under-23 Road Championships

3rd Time trial
5th Road race

2016
1st Time trial, National Under-23 Road Championships
2nd Time trial, Pan American Under-23 Road Championships
