= Luz Adriana Tovar =

Colombian cyclist (born 1983)

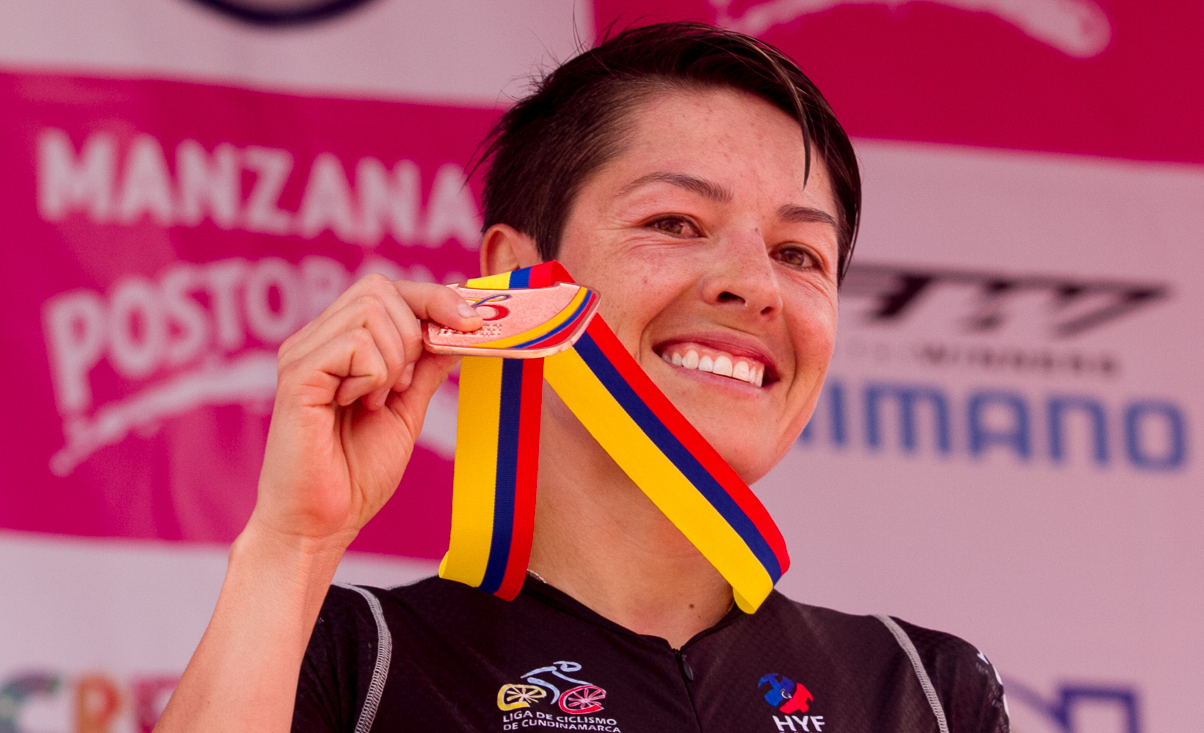
- Tovar in 2016

Personal information
- Full name: Luz Adriana Tovar Salgado
- Born: 21 February 1983 (age 43) Herveo, Colombia

Cycling career
- Sport: Cycling
- Disciplines: Road; Track
- Role: Rider

Amateur team
- 2019: IMRD Chia–Ciclo Fortaleza
Medal record
Representing Colombia
Women's track cycling
Pan American Championships
Bronze medal – third place	2011 Medellin	Team pursuit

Luz Adriana Tovar Salgado (born 21 February 1983) is a Colombian racing cyclist. She won the Colombian National Road Race Championships in 2016.

== Major results ==
2010
2nd Time trial, National Road Championships
2011
3rd Team pursuit, Pan American Track Championships
6th Time trial, Pan American Road Championships
8th Time trial, Pan American Games
2012
3rd Time trial, National Road Championships
2013
2nd Time trial, National Road Championships
2015
1st Overall Vuelta a Cundinamarca

1st Stage 1

2016
National Road Championships

1st Road race
3rd Time trial

2017
2nd Time trial, National Road Championships
