= Tianyoude Hotel Cycling Team =

Chinese cycling team

Team information
- UCI code: TYD
- Registered: China
- Founded: 2009
- Discipline: Road
- Status: UCI Continental

Key personnel
- General manager: Zhang Xiaolong
- Team managers: Tao Yilin; Dong Xiaoyong; Wu Shengjun

Team name history
- 2009–2014 2015 2016–2018 2019 2019–: Qinghai Tianyoude Cycling Team; Qinghai Tianyoude–BH Cycling Team; Qinghai Tianyoude Cycling Team; Qinghai Lianshi Sports Cycling Team; Tianyoude Hotel Cycling Team

Tianyoude Hotel Cycling Team is a Chinese UCI Continental cycling team established in 2009.

== Team roster ==
As of 3 September 2023.

Rider	Date of birth
Duojie Cairang (CHN)	1 July 2000 (age 26)
Guo Shourong (CHN)	3 February 2002 (age 24)
Li Hongbo (CHN)	21 September 2000 (age 25)
Li Hu (CHN)	5 June 1998 (age 28)
Li Zisen (CHN)	26 October 1997 (age 28)
Jonathan Monsalve (VEN)	28 June 1989 (age 37)
Yeisson Ubarley Quetama Rojas (COL)	18 June 1994 (age 32)

Rider	Date of birth
Saeid Safarzadeh (IRI)	21 September 1985 (age 40)
Sun Hailin (CHN)	1 January 2001 (age 25)
Wang Jiancai (CHN)	5 December 1994 (age 31)
Yuan Zhanhui (CHN)	5 April 1998 (age 28)
Zhang Zhishan (CHN)	3 July 1994 (age 32)
Zhu Pengwu (CHN)	27 January 2001 (age 25)

== Major wins ==
2017
Overall Tour of Qinghai Lake, Yonathan Monsalve
Stage 1 Vuelta Ciclista a Venezuela, Yonathan Monsalve
Stage 5 Tour de Singkarak, Yonathan Monsalve
2018
Stage 10 Vuelta al Táchira, Yonathan Monsalve
2019
Stage 4 Vuelta al Táchira, Yonathan Monsalve
2021
Stage 3 Tour of Qinghai Lake, Wang Jiancai
Stage 6 Tour of Qinghai Lake, Li Zisen
Stage 7 Tour of Qinghai Lake, Yuan Zhanhui
Stage 8 Tour of Qinghai Lake, Li Zisen
Overall Tour of Qinghai Lake, Zhang Zhishan
2023
Overall Tour of Azerbaijan (Iran), Saeid Safarzadeh

Stage 5, Saeid Safarzadeh
