= 2014 Pan American Road Cycling Championships =

- Venue: Puebla, Mexico
- Date: May 8–11, 2014
- Events: 6

The 2014 Pan American Road Cycling Championships took place in Puebla, Mexico, May 8–11, 2014.

== Medal summary ==
=== Men ===
Event	Gold	Silver	Bronze
Road race	Byron Guamá; Ecuador	Joey Rosskopf; United States	Juan Pablo Suárez; Colombia
Time trial	Pedro Herrera; Colombia	Joey Rosskopf; United States	Carlos Oyarzún; Chile

=== Women ===
Event	Gold	Silver	Bronze
Road race	Arlenis Sierra; Cuba	Megan Guarnier; United States	Laura Camila Lozano Ramírez; Colombia
Time trial	Evelyn Stevens; United States	Sérika Gulumá; Colombia	Megan Guarnier; United States

=== Men (under 23) ===
Event	Gold	Silver	Bronze
Road race	Fernando Gaviria; Colombia	Brayan Ramírez; Colombia	Hernando Bohórquez; Colombia
Time trial	Rodrigo Contreras; Colombia	Ignacio Prado; Mexico	Carlos Ramírez; Colombia
