= 2013 Pan American Road Cycling Championships =

- Venue: Zacatecas, Mexico
- Date(s): May 1–5, 2013
- Events: 6

The 2013 Pan American Road Cycling Championships took place in Zacatecas, Mexico, from May 1 to 5, 2013.

== Medal summary ==
=== Men ===
Event	Gold	Silver	Bronze
Road race	Jonathan Paredes; Colombia	Ignacio Sarabia; Mexico	Segundo Navarrete; Ecuador
Time trial	Carlos Oyarzún; Chile	Ignacio Sarabia; Mexico	Leandro Messineo; Argentina

=== Women ===
Event	Gold	Silver	Bronze
Road race	Arlenis Sierra; Cuba	Marlies Mejías; Cuba	Angie González; Venezuela
Time trial	Íngrid Drexel; Mexico	Carmen Small; United States	Sérika Gulumá; Colombia

=== Men (under 23) ===
Event	Gold	Silver	Bronze
Road race	Richard Carapaz; Ecuador	Isaac Bolívar; Colombia	Félix Barón; Colombia
Time trial	José Luis Rodríguez Aguilar; Chile	Facundo Gabriel Lezica; Argentina	Isaac Bolívar; Colombia
