= Brayan Ramírez (cyclist) =

Colombian cyclist

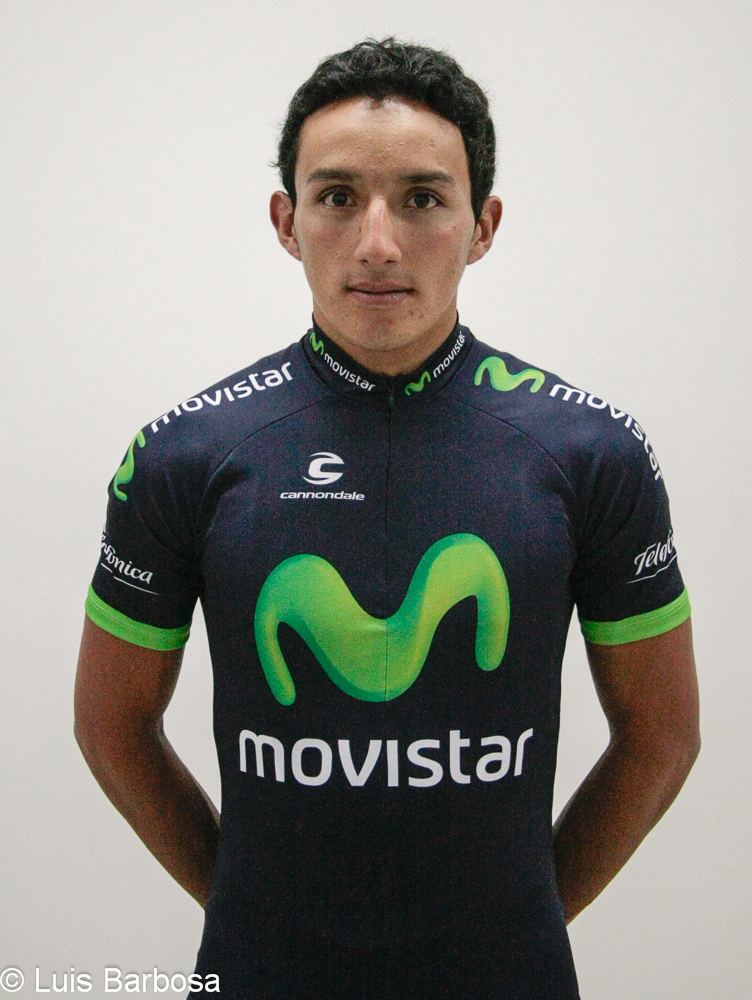
- Ramírez in 2013

Personal information
- Full name: Brayan Stiven Ramírez Chacón
- Born: 20 November 1992 (age 33) Bogotá, Colombia

Cycling career
- Sport: Cycling
- Discipline: Road
- Role: Rider
- Rider type: All-rounder

Professional teams
- 2015: Colombia
- 2016: Movistar Team América
- 2017: Medellín–Inder
- 2019: Coldeportes–Zenú
Medal record
Men's road bicycle racing
Representing Colombia
Pan American Championships
Silver medal – second place	2016 San Cristóbal	Road race

Brayan Stiven Ramírez Chacón (born 20 November 1992) is a Colombian professional racing cyclist, who last rode for UCI Continental team Coldeportes–Zenú. He rode his first Grand Tour in the 2015 Vuelta a España.

== Major results ==
2009
1st Road race, National Junior Road Championships
2010
1st Time trial, National Junior Road Championships
2011
National Under-23 Road Championships

1st Time trial
3rd Road race

2012
2nd Road race, National Road Championships
2014
1st Time trial, Central American and Caribbean Games
2nd Road race, Pan American Under-23 Road Championships
National Under-23 Road Championships

2nd Road race
3rd Time trial

3rd Time trial, South American Games
2015
Combativity award Stage 15 Vuelta a España
2016
2nd Road race, Pan American Road Championships
2nd Time trial, National Road Championships
2017
1st Overall Tour of Ankara

1st Stage 1

5th Overall Vuelta Ciclista de Chile

=== Grand Tour general classification results timeline ===
Grand Tour	2015
Giro d'Italia	—
Tour de France	—
Vuelta a España	127

Legend
—	Did not compete
DNF	Did not finish
