= Robert Sierra =

Venezuelan cyclist

Personal information
- Full name: Robert David Sierra Perez
- Born: 13 November 1996 (age 29) Venezuela

Cycling career
- Sport: Cycling
- Current team: Venezuela Pais Futuro
- Discipline: Road
- Role: Rider

Amateur teams
- 2016–2017: Gobernación de Carabobo
- 2018–: Venezuela Pais Futuro

Professional team
- 2019: Start Cycling Team

Major wins
- One-day races and Classics National Road Race Championships (2020)
Medal record
Men's track cycling
Representing Venezuela
Pan American Championships
Bronze medal – third place	2021 Lima	Points race

Robert David Sierra Perez (born 13 November 1996) is a Venezuelan racing cyclist, who currently rides for American amateur team Miami Night (NCL)

== Major results ==
2014
3rd Time trial, National Junior Road Championships
2016
1st Points race, National Track Championships
2018
2nd Scratch, National Track Championships
2019
6th Overall Vuelta a Venezuela
2020
1st Road race, National Road Championships
