= Tatiana Dueñas =

Colombian cyclist (born 1998)

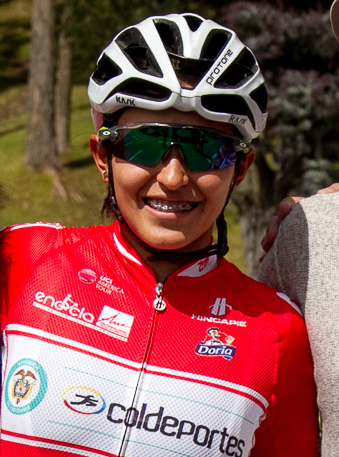
- Dueñas in 2018

Personal information
- Full name: Yesi Tatiana Dueñas Gómez
- Born: 31 March 1998 (age 28) Bogotá, Colombia

Cycling career
- Sport: Cycling
- Current team: Colnago CM Team
- Disciplines: Road cycling; Track cycling
- Role: Rider

Amateur teams
- 2017: Cycling Girls–Motul
- 2018: Coldeportes Zenú Sello Rojo
- 2020–2021: Colnago CM Team

Professional teams
- 2019–2020: Team Illuminate
- 2021–: Colnago CM Team
Medal record
Representing Colombia
Women's track cycling
| Event | 1st | 2nd | 3rd |
|---|---|---|---|
| Pan American Championships | 1 | 1 | 0 |
| CAC Games | 0 | 1 | 0 |
| South American Games | 1 | 0 | 0 |
| Bolivarian Games | 1 | 0 | 0 |
| Total | 3 | 2 | 0 |
Pan American Championships
| Gold medal – first place | 2021 Lima | Team pursuit |
| Silver medal – second place | 2021 Lima | Madison |
Central American and Caribbean Games
| Silver medal – second place | 2018 Barranquilla | Team pursuit |
South American Games
| Gold medal – first place | 2018 Cochabamba | Team pursuit |
Bolivarian Games
| Gold medal – first place | 2017 Santa Marta | Team pursuit |

Yesi Tatiana Dueñas Gómez (born 31 March 1998) is a Colombian racing cyclist, who currently rides for UCI Women's Continental Team Colnago CM Team.

== Major results ==
2016
1st Time trial, National Road Championships Juniores
1st Time trial Juniores, Pan American Road Championships
2019
3rd Road race, National Road Championships Under-23
4th Tour of Zhoushan Island I
2020
2nd Time trial, National Road Championships Under-23
2021
4th Time trial, National Road Championships
2022
2nd Time trial, National Road Championships
