= Laura Camila Lozano Ramírez =

Colombian cyclist

Laura Lozano
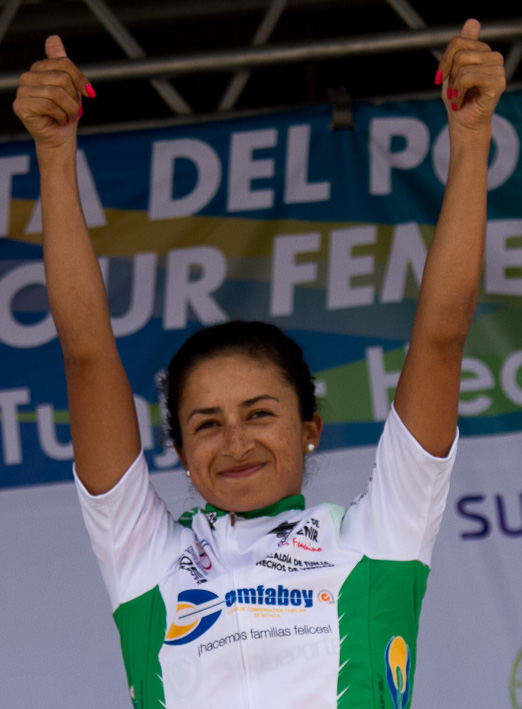
- Lozano in 2015.

Personal information
- Full name: Laura Camila Lozano Ramírez
- Born: 25 October 1986 (age 39)

Cycling career
- Sport: Cycling
- Discipline: Road
- Role: Rider

Professional teams
- 2007–2008: USC Chirio Forno d'Asolo
- 2015–2016: S.C. Michela Fanini Rox
- 2017: Servetto Giusta
- 2019–: Health Mate–Cyclelive Team
Medal record
Women's road bicycle racing
Representing Colombia
Pan American Championships
Bronze medal – third place	2014 Puebla	Road race

Laura Camila Lozano Ramírez (born 25 October 1986) is a Colombian professional racing cyclist, who rode for UCI Women's Team Health Mate–Cyclelive Team in 2019. She competed at the 2015 UCI Road World Championships.

== See also ==
- List of 2015 UCI Women's Teams and riders
