= Isaac Bolívar =

Colombian bicycle racer

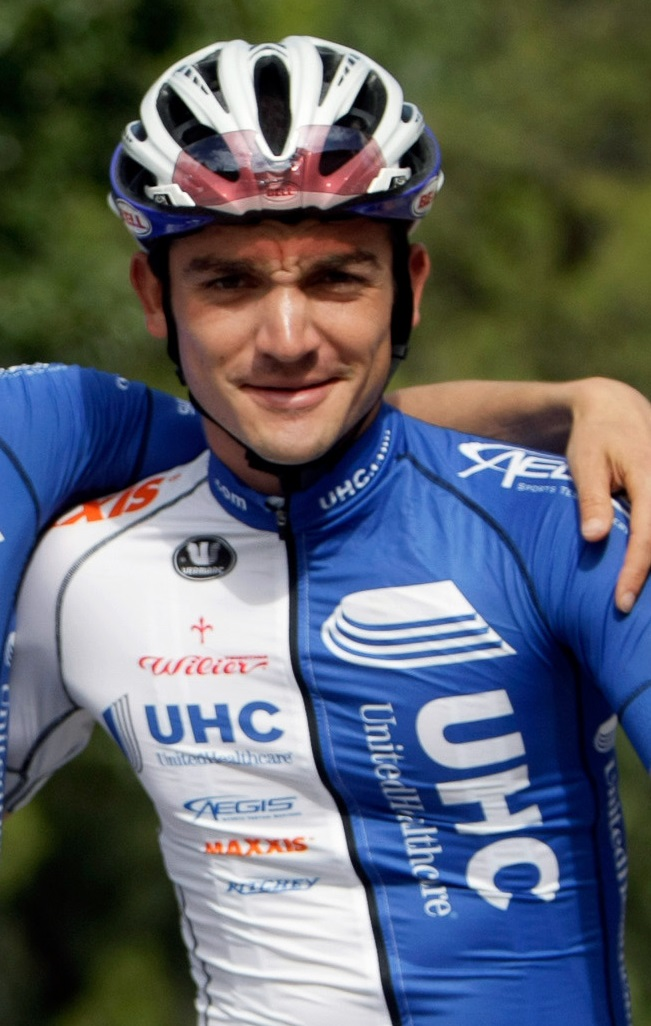
- Bolívar in 2014

Personal information
- Full name: Isaac Hernández Bolívar
- Born: May 9, 1991 (age 35) Medellín, Colombia
- Height: 1.78 m (5 ft 10 in)
- Weight: 64 kg (141 lb)

Cycling career
- Sport: Cycling
- Current team: Retired
- Discipline: Road
- Role: Rider

Amateur teams
- 2009–2010: Indeportes Antioquia
- 2013: Aguardiente Antioqueño–Lotería de Medellín–IDEA

Professional teams
- 2011: Gobernación de Antioquia–Indeportes Antioquia
- 2012: EPM–UNE
- 2014–2015: UnitedHealthcare

Isaac Hernández Bolívar (born 9 May 1991 in Medellín) is a Colombian former professional cyclist, who rode professionally between 2011 and 2015.

== Major results ==
2010
2nd Overall Vuelta de Higuito
3rd Time trial, National Under-23 Road Championships
2011
1st Stage 6 Vuelta a Colombia U23
2nd Time trial, National Under-23 Road Championships
2012
1st Stage 5 Vuelta a Guatemala
2013
1st Time trial, National Under-23 Road Championships
Pan American Under-23 Road Championships

2nd Time trial
3rd Road race

2014
3rd Overall Tour de Langkawi
