= Cycling at the 2022 South American Games =

- Venue: Agua Vista (mountain biking); Pista de BMX Freestyle (BMX freestyle); Pista BMX Racing - COP (BMX racing); Costanera José Asunción Flores (road cycling); Velódromo del COP (track cycling )
- Dates: October 2−15
- Nations: 14

Cycling competitions at the 2022 South American Games in Asunción, Paraguay were held between October 2 and 15, 2022 at the Agua Vista, Pista de BMX Freestyle, Pista BMX Racing - COP, Costanera José Asunción Flores and Velódromo del COP.

== Schedule ==
The competition schedule is as follows:

| P | Preliminary | F | Final |

BMX, Mountain biking, Road cycling
| Date Event | Sun 2 | Mon 3 | Tue 4 | Wed 5 | Thu 6 | Fri 7 | Sat 8 | Sun 9 | Mon 10 | Tue 11 | Wed 12 | Thu 13 | Fri 14 |
|---|---|---|---|---|---|---|---|---|---|---|---|---|---|
BMX freestyle
| Men's individual | | | | | | | F | | | | | | |
| Women's individual | | | | | | | F | | | | | | |
BMX racing
| Men's individual | | | | | | | | | | | | P | F |
| Women's individual | | | | | | | | | | | | P | F |
Mountain biking
| Men's cross-country | F | | | | | | | | | | | | |
| Women's cross-country | F | | | | | | | | | | | | |
Road cycling
| Men's time trial | | F | | | | | | | | | | | |
| Men's road race | | | | F | | | | | | | | | |
| Women's time trial | | F | | | | | | | | | | | |
| Women's road race | | | | F | | | | | | | | | |

Track cycling
| Date Event | Wed 12 | | Thu 13 | | Fri 14 | | Sat 15 | |
| Session → | M | A | M | A | M | A | M | |
|---|---|---|---|---|---|---|---|---|
| Men's individual sprint | | | P | F | | | | |
| Men's keirin | | | | | | | P | F |
| Men's madison | | | | | | | F | |
| Men's omnium | | | | | P | F | | |
| Men's team sprint | | | | | P | F | | |
| Men's team pursuit | P | F | | | | | | |
| Women's individual sprint | P | F | | | | | | |
| Women's keirin | | | | | P | F | | |
| Women's madison | | | | | | | F | |
| Women's omnium | | | P | F | | | | |
| Women's team sprint | | | P | F | | | | |
| Women's team pursuit | P | F | | | | | | |

== Medal summary ==
=== Medal table ===
* Host nation (Paraguay)

| Rank | Nation | Gold | Silver | Bronze | Total |
|---|---|---|---|---|---|
| 1 | Colombia | 12 | 10 | 4 | 26 |
| 2 | Argentina | 4 | 6 | 3 | 13 |
| 3 | Venezuela | 2 | 2 | 5 | 9 |
| 4 | Brazil | 2 | 1 | 3 | 6 |
| 5 | Chile | 1 | 2 | 6 | 9 |
| 6 | Paraguay* | 1 | 0 | 0 | 1 |
| 7 | Uruguay | 0 | 1 | 0 | 1 |
| 8 | Ecuador | 0 | 0 | 1 | 1 |
| Totals (8 entries) | | 22 | 22 | 22 | 66 |

=== Medalists ===
==== BMX freestyle ====
| Event | Gold | | Silver | | Bronze | |
|---|---|---|---|---|---|---|
| Men's individual | José Torres; Argentina | 89.00 | Daniel Dhers; Venezuela | 87.33 | Gustavo Oliveira; Brazil | 84.00 |
| Women's individual | Macarena Perez Grasset; Chile | 75.33 | Queen Saray Villegas; Colombia | 72.66 | Katherine Díaz; Venezuela | 71.00 |

==== BMX racing ====
| Event | Gold | Silver | Bronze |
|---|---|---|---|
| Men's individual | Nicolás Torres; Argentina | Diego Arboleda; Colombia | Wilson Goyes; Ecuador |
| Women's individual | Mariana Pajón; Colombia | Gabriela Bolle; Colombia | Agustina Cavalli; Argentina |

==== Mountain biking ====
| Event | Gold | | Silver | | Bronze | |
|---|---|---|---|---|---|---|
| Men's cross-country | Gustavo Pereira; Brazil | 1:29:56 | José Gabriel Almeida; Brazil | 1:30:29 | Fabio Castañeda; Colombia | 1:30:52 |
| Women's cross-country | Raiza Goulão; Brazil | 1:28:25 | Agustina Apaza; Argentina | 1:29:20 | Hercília Najara Souza; Brazil | 1:29:50 |

==== Road cycling ====
| Event | Gold | | Silver | | Bronze | |
|---|---|---|---|---|---|---|
| Men's time trial | Walter Vargas; Colombia | 47:01.40 | Rodrigo Contreras; Colombia | 47:50.03 | José Luis Rodríguez Aguilar; Chile | 47:54.29 |
| Men's road race | Orluis Aular; Venezuela | 3:42:39.00 | Roderyck Asconeguy; Uruguay | 3:42:39.00 | Leangel Linarez; Venezuela | 3:42:39.00 |
| Women's time trial | Agua Marina Espínola; Paraguay | 35:27.18 | Lina Hernández; Colombia | 36:24.33 | Lilibeth Chacón; Venezuela | 36:33.99 |
| Women's road race | Jennifer Cesar; Venezuela | 2:04:42.00 | Lina Hernández; Colombia | 2:04:42.00 | Aranza Villalón; Chile | 2:04:42.00 |

==== Track cycling ====
===== Men =====
| Event | Gold | Silver | Bronze |
|---|---|---|---|
| Men's individual sprint | Rubén Murillo; Colombia | Fabián Puerta; Colombia | Juan Ochoa; Colombia |
| Men's keirin | Fabián Puerta; Colombia | Leandro Bottasso; Argentina | Vicente Ramírez; Chile |
| Men's madison | Nicolás Tivani; Tomás Contte; Argentina | Cristián Arriagada; Felipe Peñaloza; Chile | Juan Pablo Zapata; Julián Osorio; Colombia |
| Men's omnium | Tomás Contte; Argentina | Nelson Soto; Colombia | Jacob Decar; Chile |
| Men's team sprint | Carlos Echeverri; Juan Ochoa; Rubén Murillo; Colombia | Leandro Bottasso; Lucas Vilar; Yoel Vargas; Argentina | Hersony Canelón; Luis Yanez; Yorber Teran; Venezuela |
| Men's team pursuit | Juan Pablo Zapata; Juan Barboza; Julián Osorio; Nelson Soto; Colombia | Nicolás Tivani; Marcos Méndez; Rubén Ramos; Tomás Contte; Argentina | Cristián Arriagada; Felipe Pizarro; Jacob Decar; Matías Arriagada; Pablo Seisdedos; Chile |

===== Women =====
| Event | Gold | Silver | Bronze |
|---|---|---|---|
| Women's individual sprint | Juliana Gaviria; Colombia | Natalia Vera; Argentina | Valeria Cardozo; Colombia |
| Women's keirin | Valeria Cardozo; Colombia | Juliana Gaviria; Colombia | Valentina Luna; Argentina |
| Women's madison | Lina Hernández; Mariana Herrera; Colombia | Cristina Irma Greve; Maribel Aguirre; Argentina | Alice Melo; Wellyda Rodrigues; Brazil |
| Women's omnium | Lina Hernández; Colombia | Lina Rojas; Colombia | Lilibeth Chacón; Venezuela |
| Women's team sprint | Juliana Gaviria; Valeria Cardozo; Yarli Mosquera; Colombia | Daniela Colilef; Paula Molina; Renata Urrutia; Chile | Milagros Sanabria; Natalia Vera; Valentina Luna; Argentina |
| Women's team pursuit | Andrea Alzate; Elizabeth Castaño; Lina Rojas; Lina Hernández; Mariana Herrera; Colombia | Angie González; Jennifer Cesar; Lilibeth Chacón; Verónica Abreu; Wilmarys Moreno; Venezuela | Camila García; Daniela Guajardo; Paula Villalón; Scarlet Cortés; Chile |

== Participation ==
Fourteen nations participated in cycling events of the 2022 South American Games.

- Argentina
- Aruba
- Bolivia
- Brazil
- Chile
- Colombia
- Curaçao
- Ecuador
- Panama
- Paraguay
- Peru
- Suriname
- Uruguay
- Venezuela

== Results ==
=== Men's BMX freestyle ===
| Rank | Name | Nation | Preliminary Heats | | | | Final |
| Rank | Name | Nation | Run 1 | Run 2 | Avg. | Rank | Score |
|---|---|---|---|---|---|---|---|
| 1st place, gold medalist(s) | José Torres | Argentina | 78.33 | 76.66 | 77.50 | 1 Q | 89.00 |
| 2nd place, silver medalist(s) | Daniel Dhers | Venezuela | 72.33 | 76.00 | 74.17 | 3 Q | 87.33 |
| 3rd place, bronze medalist(s) | Gustavo Oliveira | Brazil | 75.33 | 73.66 | 74.50 | 2 Q | 84.00 |
| 4 | Gabriel Chaves | Argentina | 72.00 | 69.33 | 70.67 | 4 Q | 80.33 |
| 5 | Job Montañez | Peru | 48.00 | 63.66 | 55.83 | 8 Q | 70.33 |
| 6 | Juan Caicedo | Colombia | 51.66 | 64-66 | 58.16 | 7 Q | 65.66 |
| 7 | Yohnatan Da Cunha | Uruguay | 61.33 | 57.00 | 59.16 | 6 Q | 56.33 |
| 8 | José Manuel Cedano | Chile | 72.33 | 68.33 | 70.33 | 5 Q | 43.33 |
| 9 | Edy Alviarez | Venezuela | 63.00 | 43.33 | 53.16 | 9 | DNA |
| 10 | Juan Vaca | Colombia | 41.33 | 56.33 | 48.83 | 10 | DNA |
| 11 | Anthony De León | Panama | 41.00 | 22.66 | 31.83 | 11 | DNA |
| 12 | Harafa Fajardo | Peru | 25.00 | 28.33 | 26.66 | 12 | DNA |
| 13 | Pedro Alcides | Paraguay | 20.00 | 17.00 | 18.50 | 13 | DNA |
| 14 | Jefferson Eichi | Paraguay | 11.00 | 10.66 | 10.83 | 14 | DNA |

=== Women's BMX freestyle ===
| Rank | Name | Nation | Preliminary Heats | | | | Final |
| Rank | Name | Nation | Run 1 | Run 2 | Avg. | Rank | Score |
|---|---|---|---|---|---|---|---|
| 1st place, gold medalist(s) | Macarena Perez Grasset | Chile | 66.00 | 77.00 | 71.50 | 3 Q | 75.33 |
| 2nd place, silver medalist(s) | Queen Saray Villegas | Colombia | 79.66 | 79.00 | 79.33 | 1 Q | 72.66 |
| 3rd place, bronze medalist(s) | Katherine Díaz | Venezuela | 75.88 | 76.33 | 76.00 | 2 Q | 71.00 |
| 4 | Lizsurley Villegas | Colombia | 80.00 | 62.66 | 71.33 | 4 Q | 69.00 |
| 5 | Analia Zacarias | Argentina | 71.33 | 69.00 | 70.17 | 5 | DNA |
| 6 | Agustina Roth | Argentina | 61.00 | 62.00 | 61.50 | 6 | DNA |
| 7 | Patricia Marín | Paraguay | 33.66 | 35.66 | 34.66 | 7 | DNA |

=== Men's BMX racing ===
Quarterfinal 1

| R | Name | Nation | R1 | R2 | R3 | Total |
|---|---|---|---|---|---|---|
| 1 | Diego Arboleda | Colombia | 1 | 1 | 1 | 3 Q |
| 2 | Jholman Sivira | Venezuela | 2 | 2 | 2 | Q |
| 3 | Cristhian Castro | Ecuador | 3 | 3 | 4 | 10 Q |
| 4 | Pedro Santos | Brazil | 4 | 5 | 3 | 12 Q |
| 5 | Benjamín Vergara | Chile | 7 | 4 | 5 | 16 |
| 6 | Goshue Keep | Curaçao | 5 | 6 | 6 | 17 |
| 7 | Horst Werner | Paraguay | 6 | 7 | 7 | 20 |

Quarterfinal 2

| R | Name | Nation | R1 | R2 | R3 | Total |
|---|---|---|---|---|---|---|
| 1= | Nicolás Torres | Argentina | 1 | 1 | 4 | 6 Q |
| 1= | Wilson Goyes | Ecuador | 2 | 3 | 1 | 6 Q |
| 3 | Gonzalo Molina | Argentina | 3 | 2 | 2 | 7 Q |
| 4 | Eddy Ballesteros | Bolivia | 4 | 4 | 3 | 11 Q |
| 5 | Gabriel Valda | Bolivia | 5 | 5 | 5 | 15 |
| 6 | Robert Vazquez | Paraguay | 6 | DNF | 6 | 18 |

Quarterfinal 3

| R | Name | Nation | R1 | R2 | R3 | Total |
|---|---|---|---|---|---|---|
| 1 | Mateo Carmona | Colombia | 1 | 1 | 1 | 3 Q |
| 2 | Bruno Andrade | Brazil | 2 | 5 | 2 | 9 Q |
| 3 | Vladimir Rodríguez | Venezuela | 3 | 4 | 3 | 10 Q |
| 4 | Mauricio Molina | Chile | 4 | 2 | 5 | 11 Q |
| 5 | Andre Felix | Curaçao | 6 | 3 | 4 | 13 |
| 6 | Andre Lacroix | Peru | 5 | DNF | DNF | 17 |

Semifinal 1

| R | Name | Nation | Total |
|---|---|---|---|
| 1 | Nicolás Torres | Argentina | 1 Q |
| 2 | Bruno Andrade | Brazil | 2 Q |
| 3 | Diego Arboleda | Colombia | 3 Q |
| 4 | Cristhian Castro | Ecuador | Q |
| 5 | Vladimir Rodríguez | Venezuela | 5 |
| 6 | Eddy Ballesteros | Bolivia | 6 |

Semifinal 2

| R | Name | Nation | Total |
|---|---|---|---|
| 1 | Gonzalo Molina | Argentina | 1 Q |
| 2 | Wilson Goyes | Ecuador | 2 Q |
| 3 | Mateo Carmona | Colombia | 3 Q |
| 4 | Jholman Sivira | Venezuela | 4 Q |
| 5 | Pedro Santos | Brazil | 5 |
| 6 | Mauricio Molina | Chile | DNF |

Final

| R | Name | Nation | Total |
|---|---|---|---|
| 1st place, gold medalist(s) | Nicolás Torres | Argentina | 1 |
| 2nd place, silver medalist(s) | Diego Arboleda | Colombia | 2 |
| 3rd place, bronze medalist(s) | Wilson Goyes | Ecuador | 3 |
| 4 | Gonzalo Molina | Argentina | 4 |
| 5 | Bruno Andrade | Brazil | 5 |
| 6 | Cristhian Castro | Ecuador | 6 |
| 7 | Mateo Carmona | Colombia | 7 |
| 8 | Jholman Sivira | Venezuela | 8 |

=== Women's BMX racing ===
| R | Name | Nation | R1 | R2 | R3 | Total |
|---|---|---|---|---|---|---|
| 1st place, gold medalist(s) | Mariana Pajón | Colombia | 1 | 1 | 1 | 3 |
| 2nd place, silver medalist(s) | Gabriela Bolle | Colombia | 3 | 2 | 2 | 7 |
| 3rd place, bronze medalist(s) | Agustina Cavalli | Argentina | 2 | 3 | 3 | 8 |
| 4 | Priscilla Carnaval | Brazil | 4 | 4 | 4 | 12 |
| 5 | Doménica Azuero | Ecuador | 5 | 5 | 5 | 15 |
| 6 | Micaela Ramírez | Peru | 6 | 6 | 6 | 18 |
| 7 | Rocío Pizarro | Chile | 7 | 7 | 7 | 21 |
| 8 | Patricia Marín | Paraguay | 8 | 8 | 8 | 24 |

=== Men's cross country ===
| Rank | Name | Nation | Time |
|---|---|---|---|
| 1st place, gold medalist(s) | Gustavo Pereira | Brazil | 1:29:56 |
| 2nd place, silver medalist(s) | José Gabriel Almeida | Brazil | 1:30:29 |
| 3rd place, bronze medalist(s) | Fabio Castañeda | Colombia | 1:30:52 |
| 4 | Nelson Peña | Colombia | 1:31:35 |
| 5 | Catriel Soto | Argentina | 1:32:15 |
| 6 | Sandro Martínez | Venezuela | 1:32:57 |
| 7 | Yonathan Mejías | Venezuela | 1:34:02 |
| 8 | Joel Contreras | Argentina | 1:36:05 |
| 9 | William Tobay | Ecuador | 1:38:19 |
| 10 | Lucas Bogado | Paraguay | 1:40:20 |
| 11 | Esteban Portillo | Paraguay | 1:43:03 |
| | Martín Vidaurre | Chile | DNF |
| | Nicolás Delich | Chile | –3 LAP |
| | César Hinojosa | Bolivia | –1 LAP |

=== Women's cross country ===
| Rank | Name | Nation | Time |
|---|---|---|---|
| 1st place, gold medalist(s) | Raiza Goulão | Brazil | 1:28:25 |
| 2nd place, silver medalist(s) | Augstina Apaza | Argentina | 1:29:20 |
| 3rd place, bronze medalist(s) | Hercília Najara Souza | Brazil | 1:29:50 |
| 4 | Michela Molina | Ecuador | 1:30:03 |
| 5 | Catalina Vidaurre | Chile | 1:31:30 |
| 6 | Yngrid Porras | Venezuela | 1:32:51 |
| 7 | Gloria Garzón | Colombia | 1:33:03 |
| 8 | Miryam Núñez | Ecuador | 1:34:25 |
| 9 | Yarela González | Chile | 1:34:31 |
| 10 | Ines Gutierrez | Argentina | 1:35:19 |
| 11 | Samira Martínez | Paraguay | 1:36:13 |
| 12 | María José Salamanca | Colombia | 1:37:32 |
| 13 | Sara Torres | Paraguay | 1:39:20 |
| 14 | Andrea Contreras | Venezuela | 1:40:21 |
| | Miriam Muñoz | Bolivia | –2 LAP |

=== Men's road race ===
| Rank | Rider | Nation | Time |
|---|---|---|---|
| 1st place, gold medalist(s) | Orluis Aular | Venezuela | 3:42:39 |
| 2nd place, silver medalist(s) | Roderyck Asconeguy | Uruguay | 3:42:39 |
| 3rd place, bronze medalist(s) | Leangel Linarez | Venezuela | 3:42:39 |
| 4 | Nelson Soto | Colombia | 3:42:39 |
| 5 | Cristian Da Rosa | Brazil | 3:42:39 |
| 6 | Héctor Quintana | Chile | 3:42:48 |
| 7 | Jonathan Caicedo | Ecuador | 3:42:48 |
| 8 | Diego Rodríguez | Uruguay | 3:42:48 |
| 9 | Brayan Sánchez | Colombia | 3:42:52 |
| 10 | Franklin Archibold | Panama | 3:42:52 |
| 11 | Emiliano Contreras | Argentina | 3:42:55 |
| 12 | Christofer Jurado | Panama | 3:43:00 |
| 13 | Francisco Kotsakis | Chile | 3:43:11 |
| 14 | German Tivani | Argentina | 3:43:11 |
| 15 | José Luis Rodríguez Aguilar | Chile | 3:43:11 |
| 16 | Leonidas Novoa | Ecuador | 3:43:16 |
| 17 | Alex Strah | Panama | 3:43:27 |
| 18 | Luis Gómez | Venezuela | 3:44:12 |
| 19 | Carlos Acuña | Paraguay | 3:44:15 |
| 20 | Bryan Gómez | Colombia | 3:44:15 |
| 21 | José Wilfrido González | Paraguay | 3:44:15 |
| 22 | César Sarabria | Venezuela | 3:44:19 |
| 23 | Pablo Anchieri | Uruguay | 3:44:29 |
| 24 | Hugo Ruiz | Peru | 3:44:29 |
| 25 | Tomás Contte | Argentina | 3:44:50 |
| 26 | Nicolás Cabrera | Chile | 3:46:05 |
| 27 | Laureano Rosas | Argentina | 3:46:12 |
| 28 | Esteban Villarreal | Ecuador | 3:46:12 |
| 29 | Carlos Samudio | Paraguay | 3:46:12 |
| 30 | Juan Manuel Barboza | Colombia | 3:49:36 |
| 31 | Rodrigo Contreras | Colombia | 3:49:36 |
| 32 | Alexis Quinteros | Ecuador | 3:49:57 |
| 33 | Fernando Ferreira | Paraguay | 3:57:44 |
| 34 | Marcos Flores | Bolivia | 3:57:44 |
| 35 | José Manuel Aramayo | Bolivia | 3:57:44 |
| 36 | Alexander Patijn | Paraguay | 3:57:44 |
| | Bolivar Espinosa | Panama | DNF |
| | Edwin Torres | Venezuela | DNF |
| | Anderson Paredes | Venezuela | DNF |
| | Yelko Gómez | Panama | DNF |
| | Lucas Gaday | Argentina | DNF |
| | Marcos Méndez | Argentina | DNF |
| | Alan Presa | Uruguay | DNF |
| | Walter Vargas | Colombia | DNF |
| | Francisco Riveros | Paraguay | DNF |
| | Maximiliano Coila | Peru | DNF |
| | Cristian Pita | Ecuador | DNF |
| | Robinson Ruiz | Peru | DNF |
| | Axel Castro | Peru | DNF |
| | Mario Franco | Bolivia | DNF |
| | Wilber Rodríguez | Bolivia | DNF |
| | Eduardo Moyata | Bolivia | DNF |
| | Bruno Zachar | Paraguay | DNF |
| | Wilfrid Camelia | Curaçao | DNF |
| | Danny Van Ommen | Curaçao | DNF |
| | Jacob Decar | Chile | DNF |

=== Women's road race ===
| Rank | Rider | Nation | Time |
|---|---|---|---|
| 1st place, gold medalist(s) | Jennifer Cesar | Venezuela | 2:04:42 |
| 2nd place, silver medalist(s) | Lina Hernández | Colombia | 2:04:42 |
| 3rd place, bronze medalist(s) | Aranza Villalón | Chile | 2:04:42 |
| 4 | Maribel Aguirre | Argentina | 2:04:42 |
| 5 | Taise Benato | Brazil | 2:04:42 |
| 6 | Wilmarys Moreno | Venezuela | 2:04:49 |
| 7 | Wellyda Rodrigues | Brazil | 2:07:22 |
| 8 | Angie Gonzalez | Venezuela | 2:07:22 |
| 9 | Diana Peñuela | Colombia | 2:07:22 |
| 10 | Paola Muñoz | Chile | 2:07:22 |
| 11 | Paula Patiño | Colombia | 2:07:22 |
| 12 | Lilibeth Chacón | Venezuela | 2:07:22 |
| 13 | Andrea Alzate | Colombia | 2:07:22 |
| 14 | Alice De Melo | Brazil | 2:07:22 |
| 15 | Agua Marina Espínola | Paraguay | 2:07:22 |
| 16 | Elizabeth Castaño | Colombia | 2:07:22 |
| 17 | Araceli Galeano | Paraguay | 2:07:22 |
| 18 | Agustina Reyes | Uruguay | 2:07:22 |
| 19 | Miryam Nuñez | Ecuador | 2:07:22 |
| 20 | Mariana García | Uruguay | 2:07:22 |
| 21 | Dayana Aguilar | Ecuador | 2:07:22 |
| 22 | Elizabeth Vasquez | Bolivia | 2:07:22 |
| 23 | Victoria Martínez | Chile | 2:07:22 |
| 24 | Verónica Abreu | Venezuela | 2:07:22 |
| 25 | Paula Villalón | Chile | 2:07:22 |
| 26 | Angy Luna | Venezuela | 2:07:22 |
| 27 | Karla Vallejos | Chile | 2:07:22 |
| 28 | Sofía Martelli | Argentina | 2:07:22 |
| 29 | Esther Galarza | Ecuador | 2:07:29 |
| 30 | Sérika Gulumá | Colombia | 2:07:29 |
| 31 | Ana Paula Polegatch | Brazil | 2:07:29 |
| 32 | Ana Vitoria Magalhães | Brazil | 2:07:29 |
| 33 | Wendy Ducreux | Panama | 2:07:31 |
| 34 | Antonella Leonardi | Argentina | 2:07:31 |
| 35 | Abigail Sarabia | Bolivia | 2:07:31 |
| 36 | Cristina Irma Greve | Argentina | 2:07:31 |
| 37 | María Mercedes Fadiga | Argentina | 2:07:31 |
| 38 | Julieta Benedetti | Argentina | 2:12:14 |
| 39 | Samira Martínez | Paraguay | 2:12:14 |
| 40 | Sara Torres | Paraguay | 2:13:09 |
| 41 | Silvia Chinchilla | Bolivia | 2:13:09 |
| 42 | Silvia Rodas | Paraguay | 2:13:09 |
| 43 | Sonia Olmedo | Paraguay | 2:13:09 |
| | Ana Gabriela Viva | Ecuador | DNF |

=== Men's road time trial ===
| Rank | Name | Nation | Time |
|---|---|---|---|
| 1st place, gold medalist(s) | Walter Vargas | Colombia | 47:01.40 |
| 2nd place, silver medalist(s) | Rodrigo Contreras | Colombia | 47:50.03 |
| 3rd place, bronze medalist(s) | José Luis Rodríguez Aguilar | Chile | 47:54.29 |
| 4 | Orluis Aular | Venezuela | 47:59.17 |
| 5 | Jonathan Caicedo | Ecuador | 49:05.26 |
| 6 | Héctor Quintana | Chile | 49:22.60 |
| 7 | Alexis Quinteros | Ecuador | 50:54.73 |
| 8 | Edwin Torres | Venezuela | 51:03.59 |
| 9 | Cristian Da Rosa | Brazil | 51:16.64 |
| 10 | Christofer Jurado | Panama | 51:32.53 |
| 11 | Franklin Archibold | Panama | 52:11.90 |
| 12 | Francisco Riveros | Paraguay | 52:59.62 |
| 13 | Arian Etcheverry | Argentina | 54:12.34 |
| 14 | Fernando Ferreira | Paraguay | 57:35.03 |
| | Mario Franco | Bolivia | DNS |

=== Women's road time trial ===
| Rank | Name | Nation | Time |
|---|---|---|---|
| 1st place, gold medalist(s) | Agua Marina Espínola | Paraguay | 35:27.18 |
| 2nd place, silver medalist(s) | Lina Hernández | Colombia | 36:24.33 |
| 3rd place, bronze medalist(s) | Lilibeth Chacón | Venezuela | 36:33.99 |
| 4 | Antonella Leonardi | Argentina | 36:37.66 |
| 5 | Ana Paula Polegatch | Brazil | 36:53.65 |
| 6 | Aranza Villalón | Chile | 36:54.88 |
| 7 | Sérika Gulumá | Colombia | 37:28.37 |
| 8 | Abigail Sarabia | Bolivia | 37:33.05 |
| 9 | Ana Vitoria Magalhães | Brazil | 38:12.27 |
| 10 | Angy Luna | Venezuela | 38:46.24 |
| 11 | Wendy Ducreux | Panama | 39:58.43 |
| 12 | Araceli Galeano | Paraguay | 40:25.83 |
| | Miryam Nuñez | Ecuador | DNS |

=== Men's sprint ===
Qualification

| Rank | Name | Nation | Time | Notes |
|---|---|---|---|---|
| 1 | Juan Ochoa | Colombia | 10.06 | Q |
| 2 | Fabián Puerta | Colombia | 10.18 | Q |
| 3 | Lucas Vilar | Argentina | 10.23 | Q |
| 4 | Rubén Murillo | Colombia | 10.32 | Q |
| 5 | Yorber Terán | Venezuela | 10.42 | Q |
| 6 | Luis Yáñez | Venezuela | 10.47 | Q |
| 7 | Hersony Canelón | Venezuela | 10.51 | Q |
| 8 | Joaquín Fuenzalida | Chile | 10.54 | Q |
| 9 | Juan Bautista Rodríguez | Argentina | 10.56 | |
| 10 | Diego Fuenzalida | Chile | 10.66 | |
| 11 | Francis Cachique | Peru | 10.70 | |
| 12 | Vicente Ramirez | Chile | 10.71 | |
| 13 | Alexis Dominguez | Paraguay | 10.78 | |
| 14 | Alexander Patijn | Paraguay | 11.48 | |

Quarterfinals

| Heat | Rank | Name | Nation | Race 1 | Race 2 | Notes |
|---|---|---|---|---|---|---|
| 1 | 1 | Juan Ochoa | Colombia | 10.77 | 10.63 | Q |
| 1 | 2 | Joaquín Fuenzalida | Chile | | | |
| 2 | 1 | Fabián Puerta | Colombia | 10.81 | 10.80 | Q |
| 2 | 2 | Hersony Canelón | Venezuela | | | |
| 3 | 1 | Lucas Vilar | Argentina | 10.64 | 10.71 | Q |
| 3 | 2 | Luis Yáñez | Venezuela | | | |
| 4 | 1 | Rubén Murillo | Colombia | 10.59 | 10.59 | Q |
| 4 | 2 | Yorber Terán | Venezuela | | | |

Semifinals

| Heat | Rank | Name | Nation | Race 1 | Race 2 | Notes |
|---|---|---|---|---|---|---|
| 1 | 1 | Rubén Murillo | Colombia | 10.36 | 10.76 | Q |
| 1 | 2 | Juan Ochoa | Colombia | | | |
| 2 | 1 | Fabián Puerta | Colombia | 10.68 | 10.86 | Q |
| 3 | 1 | Lucas Vilar | Argentina | | | |

Finals

| Rank | Name | Nation | Race 1 | Race 2 | Race 3 |
|---|---|---|---|---|---|
| 1st place, gold medalist(s) | Rubén Murillo | Colombia | 10.96 | | 10.55 |
| 2nd place, silver medalist(s) | Fabián Puerta | Colombia | | 10.90 | |
| 3rd place, bronze medalist(s) | Juan Ochoa | Colombia | 10.72 | 10.88 | |
| 4 | Lucas Vilar | Argentina | | | |

=== Men's keirin ===
Qualification 1

| Rank | Name | Nation | Notes |
|---|---|---|---|
| 1 | Leandro Bottasso | Argentina | Q |
| 2 | Fabián Puerta | Colombia | Q |
| 3 | Yorber Teran | Venezuela | Q |
| 4 | Joaquín Fuenzalida | Chile | |
| 5 | Francis Cachique | Peru | |
| 6 | Alexander Patijn | Paraguay | |

Qualification 2

| Rank | Name | Nation | Notes |
|---|---|---|---|
| 1 | Juan Ochoa | Colombia | Q |
| 2 | Vicente Ramirez | Chile | Q |
| 3 | Lucas Vilar | Argentina | Q |
| 4 | Alexis Dominguez | Paraguay | |
| 5 | Hersony Canelón | Venezuela | |

Final 1–6

| Rank | Name | Nation | Notes |
|---|---|---|---|
| 1st place, gold medalist(s) | Fabián Puerta | Colombia | |
| 2nd place, silver medalist(s) | Leandro Bottasso | Argentina | |
| 3rd place, bronze medalist(s) | Vicente Ramirez | Chile | |
| 4 | Juan Ochoa | Colombia | |
| 5 | Lucas Vilar | Argentina | |
| 6 | Yorber Teran | Venezuela | |

Final 7–12

| Rank | Name | Nation | Notes |
|---|---|---|---|
| 7 | Francis Cachique | Peru | |
| 8 | Alexis Dominguez | Paraguay | |
| 9 | Joaquín Fuenzalida | Chile | |
| 10 | Alexander Patijn | Paraguay | |
| 11 | Hersony Canelón | Venezuela | |

=== Men's madison ===
| R | Name | Nation | Points |
|---|---|---|---|
| 1st place, gold medalist(s) | Nicolás Tivani / Tomás Contte | Argentina | 46 |
| 2nd place, silver medalist(s) | Cristian Arriagada / Felipe Peñaloza | Chile | 40 |
| 3rd place, bronze medalist(s) | Juan Pablo Zapata / Julián Osorio | Colombia | 30 |
| 4 | Hugo Ruiz / Robinson Ruiz | Peru | 15 |
| 5 | Luis Gómez / Máximo Rojas | Venezuela | 17 |
| 7= | Carlos Dominguez / Carlos Acuña | Paraguay | DNF |
| 7= | Pablo Anchieri / Roderyck Asconeguy | Uruguay | DNF |

=== Men's omnium ===
| Rank | Name | Nation | Scratch | Tempo | Elimination | Points Race | Total |
|---|---|---|---|---|---|---|---|
| 1st place, gold medalist(s) | Tomás Contte | Argentina | 38 | 40 | 38 | 48 | 164 |
| 2nd place, silver medalist(s) | Nelson Soto | Colombia | 40 | 36 | 32 | 50 | 158 |
| 3rd place, bronze medalist(s) | Jacob Decar | Chile | 30 | 24 | 40 | 50 | 144 |
| 4 | Hugo Ruiz | Peru | 26 | 38 | 28 | 51 | 143 |
| 5 | Rubén Ramos | Argentina | 28 | 28 | 36 | 47 | 139 |
| 6 | Juan Pablo Zapata | Colombia | 24 | 34 | 34 | 43 | 135 |
| 7 | Matías Arriagada | Chile | 36 | 32 | 30 | 32 | 130 |
| 8 | Leangel Linarez | Venezuela | 16 | 26 | 24 | 54 | 120 |
| 9 | Pablo Anchieri | Uruguay | 22 | 18 | 18 | 45 | 103 |
| 10 | Carlos Domínguez | Paraguay | 14 | 16 | 26 | 0 | 56 |
| | César Sarabria | Venezuela | 34 | 20 | 20 | | DNF |
| | Robinson Ruiz | Peru | 32 | 22 | 22 | | DNF |
| | Bruno Zachar | Paraguay | 20 | 14 | 14 | | DNF |
| | Roderyck Asconeguy | Uruguay | 18 | 30 | 16 | | DNF |

=== Men's team sprint ===
Qualification

| Rank | Name | Nation | Time | Notes |
|---|---|---|---|---|
| 1 | Carlos Echeverri / Juan Ochoa / Rubén Murillo | Colombia | 45.26 | QG |
| 2 | Leandro Bottasso / Lucas Vilar / Yoel Vargas | Argentina | 45.66 | QG |
| 3 | Hersony Canelón / Luis Yáñez / Yorber Teran | Venezuela | 45.68 | QB |
| 4 | Diego Fuenzalida / Joaquín Fuenzalida / Vicente Ramírez | Chile | 47.30 | QB |

Finals

| Rank | Name | Nation | Time | Notes |
Gold medal match
| 1st place, gold medalist(s) | Carlos Echeverri / Juan Ochoa / Rubén Murillo | Colombia | 44.80 | |
| 2nd place, silver medalist(s) | Leandro Bottasso / Lucas Vilar / Yoel Vargas | Argentina | 45.65 | |
Bronze medal match
| 3rd place, bronze medalist(s) | Hersony Canelón / Luis Yáñez / Yorber Teran | Venezuela | 45.00 | |
| 4 | Diego Fuenzalida / Joaquín Fuenzalida / Vicente Ramírez | Chile | 47.17 | |

=== Men's team pursuit ===
Qualification

| Rank | Name | Nation | Time | Notes |
|---|---|---|---|---|
| 1 | Juan Pablo Zapata / Juan Manuel Barboza / Julián Osorio / Nelson Soto | Colombia | 4:08.48 | QG |
| 2 | Nicolás Tivani / Marcos Méndez / Rubén Ramos / Tomás Contte | Argentina | 4:11.04 | QG |
| 3 | Cristián Arriagada / Felipe Pizarro / Jacob Decar / Matías Arriagada / Pablo Seisdedos | Chile | 4:11.42 | QB |
| 4 | Ángel Pulgar / César Sanabria / Luis Gómez / Leangel Linarez / Orluis Aular | Venezuela | 4:12.54 | QB |
| 5 | Axel Castro / Hugo Ruiz / Maximiliano Coila / Robinson Ruiz | Peru | 4:23.02 | QB |
| 6 | Bruno Zachar / Carlos Domínguez / Carlos Acuña / Fernando Ferreira | Paraguay | 4:32.51 | QB |

Finals

| Rank | Name | Nation | Time | Notes |
Gold medal match
| 1st place, gold medalist(s) | Juan Pablo Zapata / Juan Manuel Barboza / Julián Osorio / Nelson Soto | Colombia | 59.06 | |
| 2nd place, silver medalist(s) | Nicolás Tivani / Marcos Méndez / Rubén Ramos / Tomás Contte | Argentina | 1:02.43 | |
Bronze medal match
| 3rd place, bronze medalist(s) | Cristián Arriagada / Felipe Pizarro / Jacob Decar / Matías Arriagada / Pablo Seisdedos | Chile | 4:08.64 | |
| 4 | Ángel Pulgar / César Sanabria / Luis Gómez / Leangel Linarez / Orluis Aular | Venezuela | 4:16.11 | |

=== Women's sprint ===
Qualification

| Rank | Name | Nation | Time | Notes |
|---|---|---|---|---|
| 1 | Juliana Gaviria | Colombia | 11.16 | Q |
| 2 | Valeria Cardozo | Colombia | 11.40 | Q |
| 3 | Marianis Salazar | Colombia | 11.65 | Q |
| 4 | Daniela Colilef | Chile | 11.69 | Q |
| 5 | Valentina Luna | Argentina | 11.73 | Q |
| 6 | Natalia Vera | Argentina | 11.75 | Q |
| 7 | Paula Molina | Chile | 11.78 | Q |
| 8 | Mariaesthela Vilera | Venezuela | 11.90 | Q |
| 9 | Tachana Dalger | Suriname | 11.91 | |
| 10 | Renata Urrutia | Chile | 12.08 | |
| 11 | Carleany Martínez | Venezuela | 12.20 | |
| 12 | Jalymar Rodríguez | Venezuela | 12.21 | |
| 13 | Silvia Rodas | Paraguay | 13.68 | |
| 14 | Araceli Galeano | Paraguay | 13.75 | |
| 15 | Sara Torres | Paraguay | 13.92 | |
| 16 | Micaela Sarabia | Bolivia | 14.76 | |

Quarterfinals

| Heat | Rank | Name | Nation | Race 1 | Race 2 | Notes |
|---|---|---|---|---|---|---|
| 1 | 1 | Juliana Gaviria | Colombia | 12.08 | 12.40 | Q |
| 1 | 2 | Mariaesthela Vilera | Venezuela | | | |
| 2 | 1 | Valeria Cardozo | Colombia | 11.77 | 12.06 | Q |
| 2 | 2 | Paula Molina | Chile | | | |
| 3 | 1 | Valentina Luna | Argentina | 11.81 | 11.79 | Q |
| 3 | 2 | Marianis Salazar | Colombia | | | |
| 4 | 1 | Natalia Vera | Argentina | 11.93 | 12.14 | Q |
| 4 | 2 | Daniela Colilef | Chile | | | |

Semifinals

| Heat | Rank | Name | Nation | Race 1 | Race 2 | Notes |
|---|---|---|---|---|---|---|
| 1 | 1 | Juliana Gaviria | Colombia | 11.76 | 12.04 | Q |
| 1 | 2 | Valentina Luna | Argentina | | | |
| 2 | 1 | Natalia Vera | Argentina | 11.93 | 12.02 | Q |
| 2 | 2 | Valeria Cardozo | Colombia | | | |

Finals

| Rank | Name | Nation | Race 1 | Race 2 | Notes |
|---|---|---|---|---|---|
| 1st place, gold medalist(s) | Juliana Gaviria | Colombia | 12.45 | 12.03 | |
| 2nd place, silver medalist(s) | Natalia Vera | Argentina | | | |
| 3rd place, bronze medalist(s) | Valeria Cardozo | Colombia | 11.77 | 12.85 | |
| 4 | Valentina Luna | Argentina | | | |

=== Women's keirin ===
Qualification 1

| Rank | Name | Nation | Notes |
|---|---|---|---|
| 1 | Juliana Gaviria | Colombia | Q |
| 2 | Carleany Martínez | Venezuela | Q |
| 3 | Natalia Vera | Argentina | Q |
| 4 | Tachana Dalger | Suriname | |
| 5 | Daniela Colilef | Chile | |

Qualification 2

| Rank | Name | Nation | Notes |
|---|---|---|---|
| 1 | Valeria Cardozo | Colombia | Q |
| 2 | Mariaesthela Vilera | Venezuela | Q |
| 3 | Valentina Luna | Argentina | Q |
| 4 | Renata Urrutia | Chile | |
| 5 | Mariana García | Uruguay | |

Final 1–6

| Rank | Name | Nation | Notes |
|---|---|---|---|
| 1st place, gold medalist(s) | Valeria Cardozo | Colombia | |
| 2nd place, silver medalist(s) | Juliana Gaviria | Colombia | |
| 3rd place, bronze medalist(s) | Valentina Luna | Argentina | |
| 4 | Natalia Vera | Argentina | |
| 5 | Carleany Martínez | Venezuela | |
| 6 | Mariaesthela Vilera | Venezuela | |

Final 7–12

| Rank | Name | Nation | Notes |
|---|---|---|---|
| 7 | Tachana Dalger | Suriname | |
| 8 | Daniela Colilef | Chile | |
| 9 | Renata Urrutia | Chile | |
| 10 | Mariana García | Uruguay | |

=== Women's madison ===
| R | Name | Nation | Points |
|---|---|---|---|
| 1st place, gold medalist(s) | Lina Hernández / Mariana Herrera | Colombia | 27 |
| 2nd place, silver medalist(s) | Cristina Irma Greve / Maribel Aguirre | Argentina | 14 |
| 3rd place, bronze medalist(s) | Alice De Melo / Wellyda Rodrigues | Brazil | 13 |
| 4 | Angie González / Lilibeth Chacón | Venezuela | 10 |
| 5 | Paola Muñoz / Scarlet Córtes | Chile | -6 |
| 6 | Araceli Galeano / Silvia Rodas | Paraguay | -59 |

=== Women's omnium ===
| Rank | Name | Nation | Scratch | Tempo | Elimination | Points Race | Total |
|---|---|---|---|---|---|---|---|
| 1st place, gold medalist(s) | Lina Hernández | Colombia | 34 | 40 | 40 | 39 | 153 |
| 2nd place, silver medalist(s) | Lina Rojas | Colombia | 40 | 32 | 36 | 34 | 142 |
| 3rd place, bronze medalist(s) | Lilibeth Chacón | Venezuela | 30 | 38 | 22 | 31 | 121 |
| 4 | Paula Villalón | Chile | 36 | 18 | 28 | 25 | 107 |
| 5 | Alice De Melo | Brazil | 28 | 36 | 38 | 0 | 102 |
| 6 | Cristina Irma Greve | Argentina | 38 | 26 | 30 | 8 | 102 |
| 7 | Angie González | Venezuela | 24 | 28 | 32 | 1 | 85 |
| 8 | Dayana Aguilar | Ecuador | 22 | 34 | 26 | 2 | 84 |
| 9 | Wellyda Rodrigues | Brazil | 32 | 30 | 34 | -17 | 79 |
| 10 | Daniela Guajardo | Chile | 26 | 22 | 24 | 5 | 77 |
| 11 | Mariana García | Uruguay | 18 | 16 | 18 | 0 | 52 |
| 12 | Maribel Aguirre | Argentina | 20 | 20 | 16 | -12 | 44 |
| 13 | Araceli Galeano | Paraguay | 14 | 24 | 0 | 0 | 38 |
| 14 | Silvia Rodas | Paraguay | 16 | 14 | 20 | -20 | 30 |
| 15 | Micaela Sarabia | Bolivia | 12 | 12 | 0 | 0 | 24 |

=== Women's team sprint ===
Qualification

| Rank | Name | Nation | Time | Notes |
|---|---|---|---|---|
| 1 | Juliana Gaviria / Valeria Cardozo / Yarli Mosquera | Colombia | 50.209 | QG |
| 2 | Daniela Colilef / Paula Molina / Renata Urrutia | Chile | 51.837 | QG |
| 3 | Milagros Sanabria / Natalia Vera / Valentina Luna | Argentina | 52.125 | QB |
| 4 | Carleany Martínez / Jalymar Rodríguez / Mariaesthela Vilera | Venezuela | 52.734 | QB |

Finals

| Rank | Name | Nation | Time | Notes |
Gold medal match
| 1st place, gold medalist(s) | Juliana Gaviria / Valeria Cardozo / Yarli Mosquera | Colombia | 50.209 | |
| 2nd place, silver medalist(s) | Daniela Colilef / Paula Molina / Renata Urrutia | Chile | 51.837 | |
Bronze medal match
| 3rd place, bronze medalist(s) | Milagros Sanabria / Natalia Vera / Valentina Luna | Argentina | 51.599 | |
| 4 | Carleany Martínez / Jalymar Rodríguez / Mariaesthela Vilera | Venezuela | 52.873 | |

=== Women's team pursuit ===
Qualification

| Rank | Name | Nation | Time | Notes |
|---|---|---|---|---|
| 1 | Andrea Alzate / Elizabeth Castaño / Lina Rojas / Lina Hernández / Mariana Herrera | Colombia | 4:38.28 | QG |
| 2 | Angie González / Jennifer Cesar / Lilibeth Chacón / Verónica Abreu / Wilmarys Moreno | Venezuela | 4:47.02 | QG |
| 3 | Camila García / Daniela Guajardo / Paula Villalon / Scarlet Cortés | Chile | 4:47.19 | QB |
| 4 | Alice De Melo / Ana Paula Polegatch / Ana Vitoria Magalhães / Taise Benato | Brazil | 4:49.07 | QB |
| 5 | Antonella Leonardi / Cristina Irma Greve / Julieta Benedetti / Maribel Aguirre | Argentina | 4:52.32 | |

Finals

| Rank | Name | Nation | Time | Notes |
Gold medal match
| 1st place, gold medalist(s) | Andrea Alzate / Elizabeth Castaño / Lina Rojas / Lina Hernández / Mariana Herrera | Colombia | | |
| 2nd place, silver medalist(s) | Angie González / Jennifer Cesar / Lilibeth Chacón / Verónica Abreu / Wilmarys Moreno | Venezuela | OVL | |
Bronze medal match
| 3rd place, bronze medalist(s) | Camila García / Daniela Guajardo / Paula Villalon / Scarlet Cortés | Chile | 4:47.04 | |
| 4 | Alice De Melo / Ana Paula Polegatch / Ana Vitoria Magalhães / Taise Benato | Brazil | 4:47.20 | |
