= Pan American Road Championships =

Annual road cycling championships

Pan American Road Cycling Championships
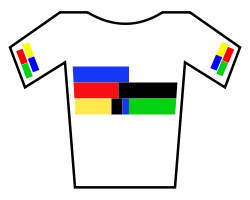
- The champion's jersey

Race details
- Region: North and South America
- Discipline: Road

History
- First edition: 1974

The Pan American Road Championships are the continental cycling championships for road bicycle racing held annually for member nations of the Pan American Cycling Confederation. Riders competing in the Pan American Cycling Championships are selected by the national governing body.

== Men ==
=== Road race ===
Year	(gold) Gold Medal	(silver) Silver Medal	(bronze) Bronze Medal
1974	(Colombia) Luis Hernán Díaz	(Colombia) Fabio Acevedo	(Colombia) Gonzalo Marín
1976	(Mexico) Rosendo Ramos	(Colombia) Luis Manrique	(Colombia) Hernán Donneys
1978	(Mexico) Rodolfo Vitela	(Colombia) Gonzalo Marín	(Mexico) Rosendo Ramos
1980	(Argentina) Eduardo Trillini	(Chile) Manuel Aravena	(Colombia) Carlos Adolfo Mesa
1981	(Chile) Manuel Aravena	(Venezuela) Olinto Silva	(Chile) Sergio Aliste
1982	(Brazil) Jair Braga	(Chile) Roberto Muñoz	(Venezuela) Justo Galavís
1984	(Colombia) Ramón Tolosa	(Colombia) Fabio Parra	(Colombia) Julio Alberto Rubiano
1986			
1988	(Colombia) Juan Carlos Arias	(Colombia) Álvaro Mejía	(Venezuela) Leonardo Sierra
1990	(Colombia) José Robles	(Colombia) Ruber Marín	(Mexico) Alexander Ernst
1992	(Ecuador) Héctor Chiles	(Ecuador) Juan Carlos Rosero	(Colombia) José Robles
1994	(Colombia) Óscar Giraldo	(Cuba) Heriberto Rodríguez	(Colombia) César Goyeneche
1996	(Brazil) Márcio May	(Argentina) Rubén Pegorin	(Brazil) Jamil Suaiden
1997	(Mexico) Eduardo Uribe	(Brazil) Márcio May	(Venezuela) Manuel Guevara
1998	(Mexico) Jesús Zárate	(Brazil) Cássio Freitas	(Colombia) Israel Ochoa
2000	(Colombia) Raúl Montaña	(Colombia) Élder Herrera	(Canada) Michael Barry
2001	(Colombia) Juan Diego Ramírez	(Colombia) Hernán Bonilla	(Colombia) Javier Zapata
2002	(Colombia) Daniel Rincón	(Colombia) Ismael Sarmiento	(Ecuador) Héctor Chiles
2004	(Venezuela) Manuel Guevara	(Colombia) Jorge Humberto Martínez	(Venezuela) Miguel Ubeto
2005	(Colombia) John Parra	(Canada) Charles Dionne	(Cuba) Damier Martínez
2006	(Colombia) José Serpa	(Brazil) Breno Sidoti	(Brazil) Alex Diniz
2007	(Canada) Martin Gilbert	(Venezuela) Manuel Medina	(Mexico) Carlos Hernández
2008	(Uruguay) Richard Mascarañas	(Mexico) Luis Fernando Macias	(Brazil) Otávio Bulgarelli
2009	(Colombia) Gregorio Ladino	(Colombia) Juan Pablo Villegas	(Colombia) Cayetano Sarmiento
2010	(Chile) Carlos Oyarzún	(Cuba) Arnold Alcolea	(Cuba) Raúl Grangel
2011	(Brazil) Gregolry Panizo	(Chile) Gonzalo Garrido	(Colombia) Luis Felipe Laverde
2012	(Argentina) Maximiliano Richeze	(Argentina) Mauro Richeze	(Uruguay) Héctor Aguilar
2013	(Colombia) Jonathan Paredes	(Mexico) Ignacio Sarabia	(Ecuador) Segundo Navarrete
2014	(Ecuador) Byron Guamá	(United States) Joey Rosskopf	(Colombia) Juan Pablo Suárez
2015	(Ecuador) Byron Guamá	(Costa Rica) Josué González	(Mexico) Juan Pablo Magallanes
2016	(Ecuador) Jonathan Caicedo	(Colombia) Brayan Ramírez	(Venezuela) Yonathan Monsalve
2017	(Colombia) Nelson Soto	(Mexico) José Aguirre	(Colombia) Juan Sebastián Molano
2018	(Colombia) Juan Sebastián Molano	(Argentina) Maximiliano Richeze	(Chile) Christopher Mansilla
2019	(Ecuador) Jefferson Cepeda	(Colombia) Julio Camacho	(Ecuador) Segundo Navarrete
2021	(Colombia) Nelson Soto	(Ecuador) Cristian Pita	(Ecuador) Sebastián Novoa
2022	(Argentina) Emiliano Contreras	(Ecuador) Sebastián Novoa	(Uruguay) Sixto Núñez
2023	(Canada) Pier-André Coté	(Argentina) Nicolás Tivani	(Canada) Charles-Étienne Chrétien
2024	(Venezuela) Leangel Linarez	(Grenada) Red Walters	(Colombia) Wilmar Paredes

=== Individual time trial ===
Year	(gold) Gold Medal	(silver) Silver Medal	(bronze) Bronze Medal
1997	(Colombia) Dubán Ramírez	(Colombia) Javier de Jesús Zapata	(Cuba) Iddis Tavarez
1998	(Argentina) Rubén Pegorín	(Colombia) Dubán Ramírez	(Brazil) Márcio May
2000	(Colombia) Víctor Hugo Peña	(Brazil) Márcio May	(Mexico) Eduardo Graciano
2001	(Colombia) Jairo Hernández	(Colombia) Javier Zapata	(Canada) Svein Tuft
2002	(Chile) José Medina	(Colombia) Johnny Leal	(Colombia) Carlos Ibáñez
2004	(Venezuela) José Isidro Chacón	(Venezuela) José Rujano	(Mexico) Domingo González
2005	(Argentina) Edgardo Simón	(Brazil) Pedro Nicácio	(Argentina) Guillermo Brunetta
2006	(Brazil) Pedro Nicácio	(Brazil) Magno Nazaret	(Canada) Eric Wohlberg
2007	(Colombia) Libardo Niño	(Canada) Zachary Bell	(Venezuela) Tomás Gil
2008	(Canada) Svein Tuft	(Argentina) Matías Médici	(Brazil) Luiz Carlos Amorim
2009	(Colombia) Juan Carlos López	(Costa Rica) Gregory Brenes	(Argentina) Matías Médici
2010	(Colombia) Iván Casas	(Chile) Carlos Oyarzun	(Colombia) Freddy Montaña
2011	(Argentina) Leandro Messineo	(Colombia) Iván Casas	(Venezuela) Tomás Gil
2012	(Argentina) Matías Médici	(Brazil) Magno Nazaret	(Argentina) Eduardo Sepúlveda
2013	(Chile) Carlos Oyarzun	(Mexico) Ignacio Sarabia	(Argentina) Leandro Messineo
2014	(Colombia) Pedro Herrera	(United States) Joey Rosskopf	(Chile) Carlos Oyarzun
2015	(Chile) Carlos Oyarzun	(Guatemala) Manuel Rodas	(Argentina) Alejandro Durán
2016	(Colombia) Walter Vargas	(Argentina) Laureano Rosas	(Colombia) Cristian Serrano Forero
2017	(Chile) José Luis Rodríguez Aguilar	(Colombia) Rodrigo Contreras	(Guatemala) Manuel Rodas
2018	(Colombia) Walter Vargas	(Argentina) Rubén Ramos	(Guatemala) Manuel Rodas
2019	(Colombia) Brandon Rivera	(Chile) José Rodríguez	(Mexico) Ignacio Prado
2021	(Colombia) Walter Vargas	(Chile) José Rodríguez	(Panama) Franklin Archibold
2022	(Colombia) Rodrigo Contreras	(Colombia) Walter Vargas	(Venezuela) Orluis Aular
2023	(Colombia) Walter Vargas	(Colombia) Miguel Ángel López	(Bermuda) Kaden Hopkins
2024	(Colombia) Walter Vargas	(Panama) Franklin Archibold	(Venezuela) Orluis Aular

== Women ==
=== Road race ===
Year	(gold) Gold Medal	(silver) Silver Medal	(bronze) Bronze Medal	Ref.
1996	(United States) Nicole Reinhart	(Cuba) Madelin Jorge	(Venezuela) Anrrosy Paruta	
2001	(Colombia) Luz Delgadillo	(Mexico) Belem Guerrero	(Colombia) Martha López	
2002	(Mexico) Belem Guerrero	(Colombia) Flor Delgadillo	(Brazil) Janildes Fernandes	
2004	(Cuba) Yoanka González	(Cuba) Yeilien Fernández	(Venezuela) Danielys García	
2005	(United States) Tina Mayola-Pic	(Cuba) Yeilien Fernández	(Cuba) Yumari González	
2006	(Cuba) Yumari González	(United States) Kori Kelley Seehafer	(Brazil) Clemilda Fernandes	
2007	(United States) Tina Pic	(Cuba) Yumari González	(Canada) Gina Grain	
2008	(Cuba) Yumari González	(Venezuela) Karelia Machado	(Mexico) Belem Guerrero	
2009	(Canada) Joëlle Numainville	(Chile) Paola Muñoz	(Mexico) Verónica Leal	
2010	(United States) Shelley Evans Olds	(Canada) Joëlle Numainville	(Cuba) Dalila Rodríguez	
2011	(Canada) Clara Hughes	(El Salvador) Evelyn García	(United States) Theresa Cliff-Ryan	
2012	(Cuba) Yumari González	(Canada) Leah Kirchmann	(Brazil) Janildes Fernandes	
2013	(Cuba) Arlenis Sierra	(Cuba) Marlies Mejías	(Venezuela) Angie González	
2014	(Cuba) Arlenis Sierra	(United States) Megan Guarnier	(Colombia) Laura Lozano	
2015	(Cuba) Marlies Mejías	(United States) Coryn Rivera	(Cuba) Yumari González	
2016	(Cuba) Iraida Garcia	(Cuba) Arlenis Sierra	(Brazil) Flávia Oliveira	
2017	(Chile) Paola Muñoz	(Brazil) Wellyda Rodrigues	(United States) Skylar Schneider	
2018	(Cuba) Arlenis Sierra	(Cuba) Iraida Garcia	(Cuba) Marlies Mejías	
2019	(Mexico) Ariadna Gutiérrez	(Chile) Denisse Ahumada	(Trinidad and Tobago) Teniel Campbell	
2021	(Colombia) Lina Hernández	(Chile) Paola Muñoz	(Trinidad and Tobago) Teniel Campbell	
2022	(Cuba) Arlenis Sierra	(Chile) Catalina Soto	(Uruguay) Fabiana Granizal	
2023	(United States) Skylar Schneider	(Canada) Alison Jackson	(Chile) Catalina Soto	
2024	(United States) Lauren Stephens	(Brazil) Wellyda Rodrigues	(Chile) Catalina Soto	
2025	(Colombia) Juliana Londoño	(United States) Skylar Schneider	(Trinidad and Tobago) Teniel Campbell	
2026	(Chile) Catalina Soto	(Argentina) Julieta Benedetti	(Colombia) Diana Peñuela	

=== Individual time trial ===
Year	(gold) Gold Medal	(silver) Silver Medal	(bronze) Bronze Medal	Ref.
2001	(Colombia) María Luisa Calle	(Colombia) Flor Delgadillo	(Cuba) Julier Rodríguez	
2002	(Mexico) Sonia López	(Colombia) Paola Madriñán	(Colombia) Flor Delgadillo	
2004	(Colombia) Paola Madriñán	(Puerto Rico) Marie Rosado	(Cuba) Yoanka González	
2005	(United States) Kristin Armstrong	(United States) Christine Thorburn	(Colombia) Paola Madriñán	
2006	(United States) Amber Neben	(Canada) Erinne Willock	(United States) Kori Kelley Seehafer	
2007	(United States) Alison Powers	(Mexico) Giuseppina Grassi	(United States) Dotsie Bausch	
2008	(Colombia) Paola Madriñán	(Mexico) Giuseppina Grassi	(United States) Kori Kelley Seehafer	
2009	(Mexico) Giuseppina Grassi	(Canada) Tara Whitten	(Argentina) Valeria Müller	
2010	(Colombia) Paola Madriñán	(United States) Amber Neben	(United States) Shelley Evans	
2011	(Canada) Clara Hughes	(United States) Evelyn Stevens	(United States) Amber Neben	
2012	(United States) Amber Neben	(Canada) Rhae-Christie Shaw	(Brazil) Clemilda Fernandes	
2013	(Mexico) Íngrid Drexel	(United States) Carmen Small	(Colombia) Sérika Gulumá	
2014	(United States) Evelyn Stevens	(Colombia) Sérika Gulumá	(United States) Megan Guarnier	
2015	(United States) Carmen Small	(Canada) Tara Whitten	(Brazil) Clemilda Fernandes	
2016	(Colombia) Sérika Gulumá	(Colombia) Ana Sanabria	(Mexico) Íngrid Drexel	
2017	(United States) Chloé Dygert	(United States) Tayler Wiles	(Cuba) Marlies Mejías	
2018	(United States) Amber Neben	(United States) Lauren Stephens	(Colombia) Ana Sanabria	
2019	(United States) Leah Thomas	(United States) Amber Neben	(Chile) Constanza Paredes	
2021	(Cuba) Marlies Mejías	(Colombia) Lina Hernández	(Chile) Aranza Villalón	
2022	(Venezuela) Lilibeth Chacón	(Colombia) Lina Hernández	(Argentina) Antonella Leonardi	
2023	(United States) Amber Neben	(Chile) Aranza Villalón	(Canada) Alison Jackson	
2024	(United States) Amber Neben	(United States) Lauren Stephens	(Chile) Aranza Villalón	
2025	(United States) Ruth Edwards	(United States) Emily Erlich	(Trinidad and Tobago) Teniel Campbell	
2026	(United States) Kristen Faulkner	(United States) Emily Erlich	(Chile) Aranza Villalón	
