= Chilean National Road Race Championships =

National road cycling championship in Chile

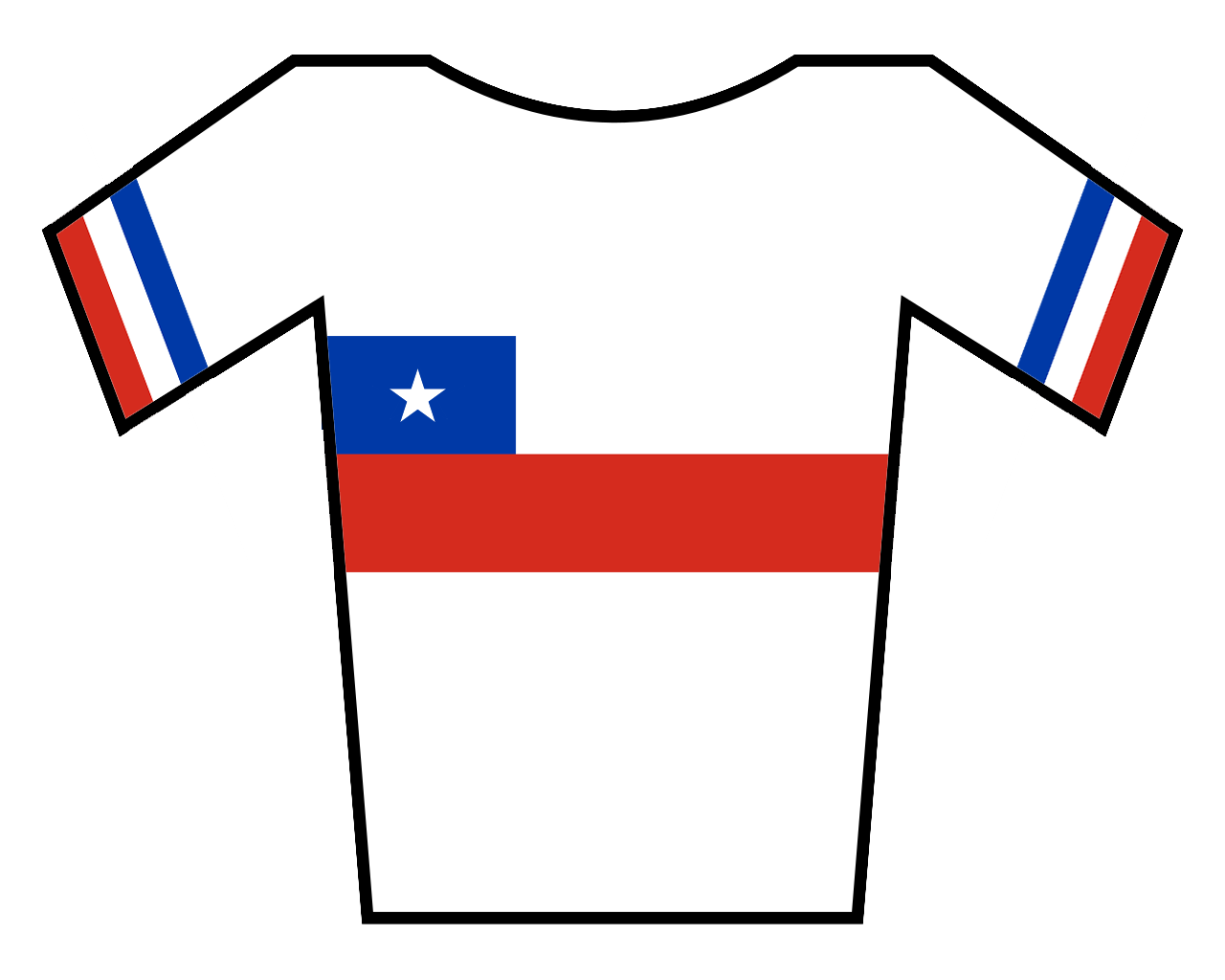
The champion's jersey

The Chilean National Road Race Championships is a cycling race where the Chilean cyclists decide who will become the champion for the year to come.

== Men ==
=== Elite ===
Year	Gold	Silver	Bronze
1997	Jose Alfredo Medina Andrade	Juan Fierro	Gonzalo Garrido
1998			
1999	Luis Sepúlveda	Marco Arriagada	Gonzalo Garrido
2000	Marcelo Sandoval	Gonzalo Garrido	César Doussang
2001			
2002			
2003	Gonzalo Garrido	Marcelo Arriagada	Gonzalo Miranda
2004	Jaime Bretti	Marcelo Sandoval	Gonzalo Garrido
2005	Juan Francisco Cabrera	Arturo Corvalan	Richard Rodríguez
2006	Gonzalo Garrido	Luis Sepúlveda	Richard Rodríguez
2007	Gonzalo Garrido	Juan Francisco Cabrera	Jaime Bretti
2008	Gonzalo Miranda	Gonzalo Garrido	Patricio Almonacid
2009	José Aravena	Patricio Almonacid	Cesar Oliva
2010	Luis Sepúlveda	Marco Arriagada	Elías Adrián
2011	Gonzalo Garrido	Andrei Sartassov	Patricio Almonacid
2012	Carlos Oyarzún	Pablo Alarcón	Pedro Palma Santos
2013	Julio Garcés	Ricardo Paredes	Gerson Zúñiga
2014	Lino Arriagada	Pablo Alarcón	Gerson Zúñiga
2015	José Luis Rodríguez Aguilar	Gonzalo Garrido	Wolfgang Burmann
2016	Edison Bravo	Pedro Palma	Javier Gallardo
2017	José Luis Rodríguez Aguilar	Gonzalo Garrido	Patricio Almonacid
2018	Adrian Alvarado	Antonio Cabrera	Lino Arriagada
2019	Felipe Andres Peñalosa	Cristian Ojeda	Adrian Alvarado
2021	José Luis Rodríguez Aguilar	Abraham Gomez	Francisco Lagos
2022	José Luis Rodriquez	Abraham Paredes	Francisko Kotsakis
2023	Manuel Lira	Joaquin Corvalan	José Luis Rodriquez

=== U23 ===
Year	Gold	Silver	Bronze
2008	Juan Raúl Bravo	Luis Bravo	Pedro Amauri Palma
2009	Pedro Amauri Palma	Diego Vera	Oscar Valencia
2010	Gonzalo Andre González	Pedro Amauri Palma	Cristopher Javier Mansilla
2011	Pedro Amauri Palma	Vicente Muga	Wolfgang Burmann
2012	Jonathan Andrés Guzman	Marcel Vandel	Germán Alfredo Bustamante
2013	José Luis Rodríguez Aguilar	Juan Carrasco	Mandel Arnold Marquez
2014	José Luis Rodríguez Aguilar	Juan Cabrera	Matias Alejandro Muñoz
2015	José Luis Rodríguez Aguilar	Sebastian Reyes	Carlos Olivares
2016	Matias Muñoz	José Luis Rodríguez Aguilar	Matias Fernando Arriagada
2019	Nicolas Cabrera	Diego Ferreyra	José Eduardo Autran

== Women ==
Year	Gold	Silver	Bronze
1999	Elisa Maria Garcia	Silvia Gonzalez Uribe	Macarena Larrain
2000	Claudia Aravena Cortes	Alejandra Saavedra	Silvia Gonzalez Uribe
2006	Marta Bobadilla	Laura Soto	Daniela Garces
2007	Paola Muñoz	Francisca Campos	Barbara Arancibia
2008	Paola Muñoz	Francisca Campos	Olga Cisterna
2009	Romina Díaz	Margarita Hernandez	Olga Cisterna
2010	Paola Muñoz	Olga Cisterna	Daniela Guajardo
2011	Daniela Rojas	Leslie Pugar	Constanza Gonzalez
2012	Paola Muñoz	Karla Vallejos	Flor Palma Dos Santos
2013	Karla Vallejos	Constanza Paredes	Carla Darras
2014	Paola Muñoz	Daniela Guajardo	Karla Vallejos
2015	Denisse Ahumada	Karla Vallejos	Paola Muñoz
2016	Karla Vallejos	Stephanie Subercaseaux	Gigliolla Monichi Orellana
2017	Paola Muñoz	Paula Ruiz	Constanza Paredes
2018	Aranza Villalón		
2019	Denisse Ahumada	Aranza Villalón	Fernanda Subiabre
2021	Aranza Villalón	Paula Villalon	Karla Vallejos

== See also ==
- Chilean National Time Trial Championships
- National Road Cycling Championships
