= 2017 Pan American Road Cycling Championships =

- Venue: Santo Domingo, Dominican Republic
- Date(s): May 4–7, 2017
- Nations participating: 27
- Events: 8

The 2017 Pan American Road Cycling Championships took place at Santo Domingo, Dominican Republic, May 4–7, 2017. This was the 32nd edition of the continental championship. The event gave berths for the 2018 Central American and Caribbean Games.

== Medal summary ==
=== Men ===
Event	Gold	Silver	Bronze
Individual road race	Nelson Soto; Colombia	José Aguirre; Mexico	Juan Sebastián Molano; Colombia
Individual time trial	José Rodríguez; Chile	Rodrigo Contreras; Colombia	Manuel Rodas; Guatemala

=== Women ===
Event	Gold	Silver	Bronze
Individual road race	Paola Muñoz; Chile	Wellyda Rodrigues; Brazil	Skylar Schneider; United States
Individual time trial	Chloé Dygert; United States	Tayler Wiles; United States	Marlies Mejías; Cuba

=== Under 23 Men ===
Event	Gold	Silver	Bronze
Individual road race	Matías Muñoz; Chile	Germán Tivani; Argentina	José Alfredo Santoyo; Mexico
Individual time trial	José Alexis Rodríguez; Costa Rica	Ian Garrison; United States	Germán Tivani; Argentina

=== Under 23 Women ===
Event	Gold	Silver	Bronze
Individual road race	Wellyda Rodrigues; Brazil	Skylar Schneider; United States	Tatielle Valadares; Brazil
Individual time trial	Chloé Dygert; United States	Aranza Villalón; Chile	Jessica Parra; Colombia

== Results ==
=== Men elite road race ===
Rank	Rider	Nation	Time
1st place, gold medalist(s)	Nelson Soto	Colombia	3:18:47
2nd place, silver medalist(s)	José Aguirre	Mexico	3:18:47
3rd place, bronze medalist(s)	Juan Sebastián Molano	Colombia	3:18:47
4	Francisco Chamorro	Argentina	3:18:47
5	Ignacio Maldonado	Uruguay	3:18:47
6	Xavier Quevedo	Venezuela	3:18:47
7	Diego Milán	Dominican Republic	3:18:47
8	Elías Tello	Chile	3:18:47
9	Pablo Anchieri	Uruguay	3:18:47
10	Jesús Pérez	Venezuela	3:18:47
11	Julio Padilla	Guatemala	3:18:47
12	Byron Guamá	Ecuador	3:18:47
13	Phillip Clarke	Barbados	3:18:47
14	Felix Nodarse	Cuba	3:18:47
15	Kélian Duro	France	3:18:47
16	Efren Santos	Mexico	3:18:47
17	Juan José Cueto	Dominican Republic	3:18:47
18	Boris Carène	France	3:18:47
19	Royner Navarro	Peru	3:18:47
20	Allan Hernández	Honduras	3:18:47
21	Onel Santa Clara	Cuba	3:18:47
22	Pedro Gutiérrez	Venezuela	3:18:47
23	Yans Arias	Cuba	3:18:47
24	Alder Torres	Guatemala	3:18:47
25	Dorian Monterroso	Guatemala	3:18:47
26	Segundo Navarrete	Ecuador	3:18:47
27	Fernando Briceño	Venezuela	3:18:47
28	Manuel Rhodes	Guatemala	3:18:47
29	Robert Steward	Belize	3:18:47
30	Samuel Gevan	Trinidad and Tobago	3:18:47
31	Ruben Ramos	Argentina	3:18:47
32	Jorge Torres	Honduras	3:18:47
33	Xavier Santana	Puerto Rico	3:18:47
34	William Guzmán	Dominican Republic	3:18:47
35	Dominique Mahyo	Bermuda	3:18:47
36	Fredy González	Bolivia	3:18:47
37	Máximo Rojas	Venezuela	3:18:47
38	Frank Consuegra	Cuba	3:18:47
39	Juan Rendón	Colombia	3:18:47
40	Ulises Alfredo Castillo	Mexico	3:18:47
41	Ismael Sánchez	Dominican Republic	3:18:47
42	José Luis Rodríguez	Chile	3:18:47
43	Jesse Kelly	Barbados	3:18:47
44	Paul Denobrega	Guyana	3:18:47
45	Alejandro Morales	Chile	3:18:47
46	Rene Corella	Mexico	3:18:47
47	Jonathan Caicedo	Ecuador	3:18:47
48	Gonzalo Najar	Argentina	3:18:47
49	Laureano Rosas	Argentina	3:18:47
50	Adderlyn Cruz	Dominican Republic	3:18:47
51	Martial Rene	France	3:18:47
52	Ignacio Sarabia	Mexico	3:18:47
53	José Alarcón	Venezuela	3:18:47
54	Luis Sepúlveda	Chile	3:18:47
55	Manuel Rodas	Guatemala	+00:00:01
56	José Aguirre	Mexico	+00:00:18
57	Nicolás Naranjo	Argentina	+00:00:18
58	Alex Cano	Colombia	+00:00:36
59	Gonzalo Garrido	Chile	+00:00:39
60	Alfredo Ajpacaja	Guatemala	+00:01:54
61	Ron Vasquez	Belize	+00:03:08
62	Facundo Lezica	Argentina	+00:03:08
63	Felipe Peñaloza	Chile	+00:03:58
64	Argenis Vanegas	Nicaragua	+00:06:09
65	Jorge Montenegro	Ecuador	+00:07:34
66	Edgar Arana	Belize	+00:11:47
67	Sebastián Trillini	Argentina	+00:12:36
68	Roger Artiaga	Nicaragua	+00:12:36
69	Junior Niles	Guyana	+00:15:09
70	Jean Nulo	Haiti	+00:15:53

Qualified for the 2018 Central American and Caribbean Games
