= Cycling at the 2023 Pan American Games – Women's road time trial =

Women's road time trial at the 2023 Pan American Games
- Venue: Streets of Isla de Maipo
- Dates: October 22
- Competitors: 16 from 10 nations
- Winning time: 25:45.38

Medalists
Gold medal	Kristen Faulkner	United States
Silver medal	Arlenis Sierra	Cuba
Bronze medal	Aranza Villalón	Chile

The women's road time trial competition of the cycling events at the 2023 Pan American Games was held on October 22 on the streets of Isla de Maipo, Chile.

== Schedule ==
Date	Time	Round
October 22, 2023	09:15	Final

== Results ==
Rank	Rider	Nation	Time
1st place, gold medalist(s)	Kristen Faulkner	United States	25:45.38
2nd place, silver medalist(s)	Arlenis Sierra	Cuba	26:07.11
3rd place, bronze medalist(s)	Aranza Villalón	Chile	26:07.28
4	Lauren Stephens	United States	26:27.51
5	Agua Marina Espínola	Paraguay	27:07.83
6	Ngaire Barraclough	Canada	27:11.65
7	Lina Hernández	Colombia	27:27.72
8	Diana Peñuela	Colombia	27:44.92
9	Andrea Ramírez	Mexico	28:06.95
10	Ana Paula Polegatch	Brazil	28:08.19
11	Lilibeth Chacón	Venezuela	28:10.90
12	Ruby West	Canada	28:12.65
13	Catalina Soto	Chile	28:14.18
14	Lina Rojas	Colombia	28:31.15
15	Marcela Prieto	Mexico	28:35.93
16	Miryam Núñez	Ecuador	28:36.38
