= Chilean National Time Trial Championships =

National road cycling championship in Chile

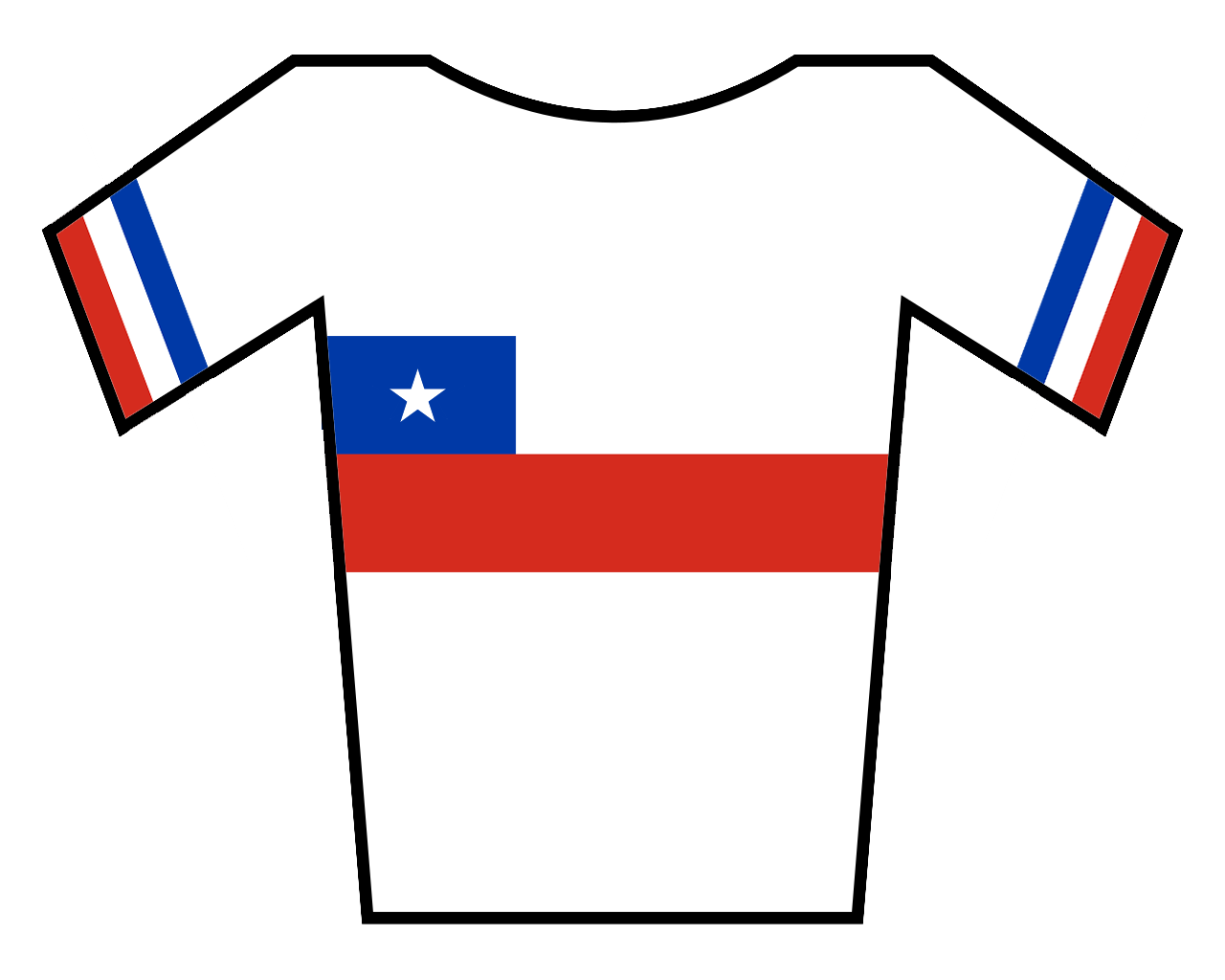
The champion's jersey

The Chilean National Time Trial Championships is a cycling race where the Chilean cyclists compete to decide who will become the champion for the year to come in the time trial discipline.

== Men ==
=== Elite ===
Year	Gold	Silver	Bronze
2000	Luis Sepúlveda	Marco Arriagada	Pablo González
2001	Marco Arriagada	Sven Harms	Luis Sepúlveda
2002			
2003	Marco Arriagada	Juan Fierro	José Medina
2004	Juan Fierro	Antonio Cabrera	Patricio Almonacid
2005			
2006	Marco Arriagada	Luis Sepúlveda	José Medina Andrade
2007	José Medina Andrade	Marco Arriagada	Jorge Contreras
2008	Robinson Núñez	José Medina	Luis Sepúlveda
2009	Jorge Contreras	Robinson Nuñez	José Medina
2010	Marco Arriagada	Juan Fernández Faundez	José Medina
2011	Gonzalo Garrido	Patricio Almonacid	Juan Norambuena
2012	Carlos Oyarzún	Pedro Palma	Daniel Cádiz
2013	Gerson Zúñiga	Cristian Humire	Juan Peredo
2014	Jonathan Guzmán	Daniel Cádiz	Pablo Seisdedos; Gerson Zúñiga
2015	Wolfgang Burmann	Jorge Contreras	Patricio Almonacid
2016	José Luis Rodríguez Aguilar	Matías Muñoz	Patricio Almonacid
2017	José Luis Rodríguez Aguilar	Diego Ferreyra	Jonathan Guzmán
2018	Germán Bustamente	Luis Sepúlveda	Luis Matías Delgado
2019	José Luis Rodríguez Aguilar	Matías Arriagada	Elias Tello
2021	José Luis Rodríguez Aguilar	Abraham Paredes Gomez	Juan Lira Eguiguren
2022	José Luis Rodríguez Aguilar	Patricio Baeza	Diego Ferreyra

=== U23 ===
Year	Gold	Silver	Bronze
2008	Juan Raúl Bravo	Luis Bravo	Juan Norambuena
2009	Óscar Valencia	Julio Garcés	Pedro Palma
2010	Pedro Palma	Cristopher Mansilla	Jonathan Guzmán
2011	Wolfgang Burmann	Vicente Muga	Pedro Palma
2012	Jonathan Guzmán	Germán Bustamente	Óscar Velásquez
2013	José Luis Rodríguez Aguilar	Germán Bustamante	Wolfgang Burmann
2014	José Luis Rodríguez Aguilar	Matías Muñoz	Ricardo Martínez
2015	José Luis Rodríguez Aguilar	Germán Bustamante	Brandon Urrutia
2016	José Luis Rodríguez Aguilar	Matías Muñoz	Maximiliano Tapia
2019	Diego Ferreyra	Alejandro Lovera	Nicolas Alejandro Cabrera
2021	Hector Quintana	Cristian Pizarro	Felipe Mancilla
2022	Hector Quintana	Jacob Decar	Felipe Mancilla

== Women ==
Year	Gold	Silver	Bronze
1999	Macarena Larrain	Alejandra Saavedra	Silvia Gonzalez Uribe
2000	Claudia Aravena Cortes	Alejandra Saavedra	Silvia Gonzalez Uribe
2006	Paulina Fuentealba Duran	Claudia Miranda	
2007	Barbara Arancibia	Irene Aravena Cortes	Paulina Fuentealba Duran
2008	Francisca Campos	Irene Aravena Cortes	Olga Cisterna
2009	Claudia Aravena Cortes	Barbara Arancibia	Olga Cisterna
2010	Olga Cisterna	Francisca Navarro	Marta Bobadilla
2011	Leslie Pugar	Ana Bobadilla	
2012	Flor Palma Dos Santos	Karla Vallejos	Olga Cisterna
2013	Karla Vallejos	Carla Darras	Constanza Paredes
2014	Daniela Guajardo	Constanza Paredes	Karla Vallejos
2015	Daniela Guajardo	Constanza Paredes	Paola Muñoz
2016	Aranza Villalón	Constanza Paredes	Stephanie Subercaseaux
2017	Aranza Villalón	Constanza Paredes	Vanessa Vidal
2018	Aranza Villalón		
2019	Constanza Paredes	Denisse Ahumada	Aranza Villalón
2021	Aranza Villalón	Paula Villalon	Stephanie Subercaseaux
2022	Catalina Campos	Fernanda Santander	Aranza Villalón

== See also ==
- Chilean National Road Race Championships
- National Road Cycling Championships
