= José Luis Rodríguez Aguilar =

Chilean bicycle racer

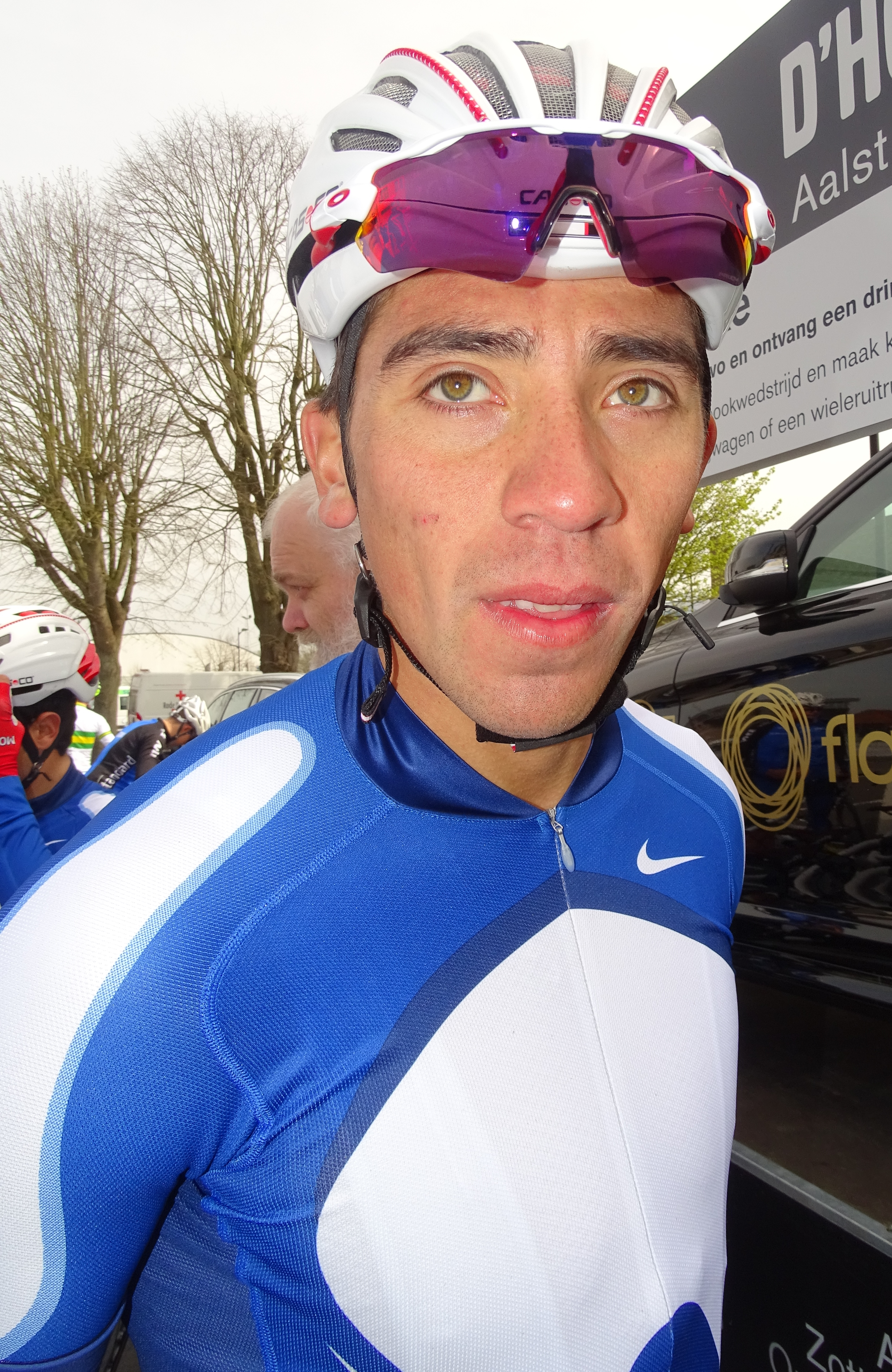
- Rodríguez Aguilar in 2016

Personal information
- Full name: José Luis Rodríguez Aguilar
- Nickname: Pipo
- Born: 1 June 1994 (age 32) Coyhaique, Chile
- Height: 1.80 m (5 ft 11 in)
- Weight: 75 kg (165 lb)

Cycling career
- Sport: Cycling
- Current team: Plus Performance–ZEO Sport
- Discipline: Road
- Role: Rider
- Rider type: Time trialist

Amateur teams
- 2010–2013: CC Coyhaique
- 2014: Clos de Pirque–Trek
- 2015–2017: World Cycling Centre
- 2019: Biobío
- 2022–2023: CC Patagonia Austral

Professional teams
- 2016: Trek–Segafredo (stagiaire)
- 2018: Sindicato de Empleados Publicos de San Juan
- 2021: Start Cycling Team
- 2023: Swift Carbon Pro Cycling Brasil
- 2024–: Plus Performance–Solutos

Major wins
- One-day races and Classics Pan American Time Trial Championships (2017) National Road Race Championships (2015, 2017, 2021) National Time Trial Championships (2016, 2017, 2019, 2021–2024)
Medal record
Men's road cycling
Pan American Games
Bronze medal – third place	2019 Lima	Time trial
South American Games
Bronze medal – third place	2022 Asunción	Time trial
Pan American Championships
Gold medal – first place	2017 Santo Domingo	Time trial
Silver medal – second place	2019 Ixmiquilpan	Time trial
Silver medal – second place	2021 Santo Domingo	Time trial
Men's track cycling
Pan American Games
Bronze medal – third place	2019 Lima	Team pursuit

José Luis Rodríguez Aguilar (born 1 June 1994) is a Chilean cyclist, who currently rides for UCI Continental team Localiza Meoo / Swift Pro Cycling.

== Major results ==
2012
1st Time trial, National Junior Road Championships
2013
1st Time trial, Pan American Under-23 Road Championships
National Under-23 Road Championships

1st Road race
1st Time trial

2014
National Under-23 Road Championships

1st Road race
1st Time trial

1st Overall Volta Ciclística Internacional do Rio Grande do Sul

1st Young rider classification

1st Stage 3 Vuelta a Mendoza
Pan American Under-23 Road Championships

4th Time trial
7th Road race

6th Time trial, South American Games
2015
National Road Championships

1st Road race
1st Under-23 road race
1st Under-23 time trial

1st Stage 1 Vuelta de la Leche
Pan American Under-23 Road Championships

2nd Road race
3rd Time trial

2016
Pan American Under-23 Road Championships

1st Time trial
1st Road race

1st Time trial, National Road Championships
9th Overall Giro della Valle d'Aosta
2017
1st Time trial, Pan American Road Championships
National Road Championships

1st Road race
1st Time trial

2019
1st Time trial, National Road Championships
2nd Time trial, Pan American Road Championships
Pan American Games

3rd Time trial
7th Road race

10th Overall Vuelta Ciclista a Chiloe
2021
National Road Championships

1st Road race
1st Time trial

2nd Time trial, Pan American Road Championships
2022
1st Time trial, National Road Championships
3rd Time trial, South American Games
4th Road race, Pan American Road Championships
2023
National Road Championships

1st Time trial
3rd Road race

1st Sprint classification, Vuelta del Porvenir San Luis
3rd Time trial, Pan American Road Championships
6th Time trial, Pan American Games
2024
National Road Championships

1st Time trial
2nd Road race

6th Time trial, Pan American Road Championships
