= Cycling at the 2011 Pan American Games – Men's road time trial =

Men's road time trial at the 2011 Pan American Games
- Venue: Guadalajara Circuit
- Dates: October 16
- Competitors: 14 from 10 nations

Medalists
Gold medal	Marlon Pérez Arango	Colombia
Silver medal	Matías Médici	Argentina
Bronze medal	Carlos Oyarzun	Chile

The men's road time trial competition of the cycling events at the 2011 Pan American Games was held on October 16 at the Guadalajara Circuit in Guadalajara. The defending Pan American Games champion is Santiago Botero of Colombia.

== Schedule ==
All times are Central Standard Time (UTC−6).

Date	Time	Round
October 16, 2011	10:00	Final

== Results ==
14 competitors from 10 countries are scheduled to compete.

Rank	Rider	Time
1st place, gold medalist(s)	Marlon Pérez Arango (COL)	49:56.93
2nd place, silver medalist(s)	Matías Médici (ARG)	50:00.98
3rd place, bronze medalist(s)	Carlos Oyarzun (CHI)	50:27.60
4	Gregory Brenes (CRC)	50:43.00
5	Leandro Messineo (ARG)	50:46.98
6	Carlos Lopez (MEX)	51:13.60
7	Iván Casas (COL)	51:21.13
8	Tomás Gil (VEN)	51:38.74
9	Rémi Pelletier (CAN)	52:01.07
10	Arnold Alcolea (CUB)	52:10.73
11	Bernardo Colex (MEX)	52:11.53
12	Rob Britton (CAN)	52:19.66
13	Gregolry Panizo (BRA)	52:32.00
14	Robert Marsh (ATG)	56:49.77
