= Nelson Soto (cyclist) =

Colombian road cyclist (born 1994)

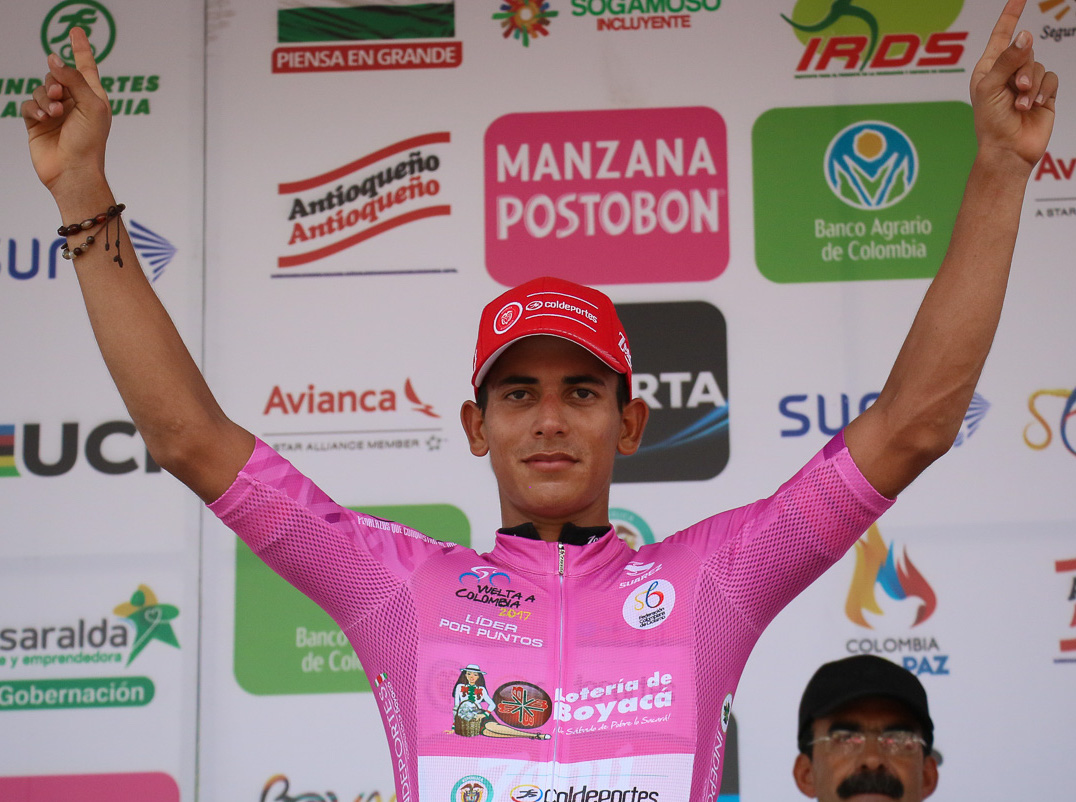
- Soto in 2017.

Personal information
- Full name: Nelson Andrés Soto Martínez
- Born: 19 June 1994 (age 32) Barranquilla, Colombia
- Height: 1.78 m (5 ft 10 in)
- Weight: 66 kg (146 lb)

Cycling career
- Sport: Cycling
- Current team: Petrolike
- Disciplines: Road cycling; Track cycling
- Role: Rider
- Rider type: Sprinter

Amateur teams
- 2015: Metropolitan Green Planet
- 2016: Coldeportes–Claro
- 2023: Colombia Pacto por el Deporte

Professional teams
- 2017: Coldeportes–Zenú
- 2018–2019: Caja Rural–Seguros RGA
- 2020–2022: Colombia Tierra de Atletas–GW Bicicletas
- 2024–: Petrolike
Medal record
Representing Colombia
Men's track cycling
Event	1st	2nd	3rd
Pan American Games	0	1	0
Pan American Championships	0	1	1
CAC Games	1	0	0
South American Games	1	1	0
Total	2	3	1
Pan American Games
Silver medal – second place	2023 Santiago	Team pursuit
Pan American Championships
Silver medal – second place	2025 Asunción	Points race
Bronze medal – third place	2025 Asunción	Team pursuit
Central American and Caribbean Games
Gold medal – first place	2023 San Salvador	Team pursuit
South American Games
Gold medal – first place	2022 Asunción	Team pursuit
Silver medal – second place	2022 Asunción	Omnium
Men's road cycling
Event	1st	2nd	3rd
Pan American Championships	2	0	0
CAC Games	1	0	0
Bolivarian Games	0	0	1
Total	3	0	1
Pan American Championships
Gold medal – first place	2017 Santo Domingo	Road race
Gold medal – first place	2021 Santo Domingo	Road race
Central American and Caribbean Games
Gold medal – first place	2018 Barranquilla	Road race
Bolivarian Games
Bronze medal – third place	2017 Santa Marta	Road race

Nelson Andrés Soto Martínez (born 19 June 1994 in Barranquilla) is a Colombian cyclist, who currently rides for UCI Continental team Petrolike. In August 2018, he was named in the startlist for the Vuelta a España.

== Major results ==
2017
1st Road race, Pan American Road Championships
Vuelta a Colombia

1st Points classification
1st Stages 3, 10 & 11

2018
1st Road race, Central American and Caribbean Games
1st Stage 2 Vuelta a la Comunidad de Madrid
2019
4th Route Adélie
10th Trofeo Matteotti
2020
4th Poreč Trophy
2021
1st Road race, Pan American Road Championships
1st Stage 1 Vuelta a Colombia
2022
4th Road race, National Road Championships
2024
1st Stage 1 Vuelta al Táchira

=== Grand Tour general classification results timeline ===
Grand Tour	2018
Giro d'Italia	—
Tour de France	—
Vuelta a España	154

Legend
—	Did not compete
DNF	Did not finish
