= Ramón Tolosa =

Colombian road cyclist (1960–2025)

Personal information
- Full name: Ramón Jesús Tolosa Calvo
- Born: 4 May 1960 Paipa, Colombia
- Died: 29 August 2025 (aged 65) Ibagué, Colombia

Cycling career
- Sport: Cycling
- Discipline: Road
- Role: Rider

Amateur teams
- 1983: Banco de Colombia
- 1984: Perfumería Yaneth

Professional teams
- 1986: Café de Colombia–Varta
- 1987–1990: Western–Rossin
Medal record
Men's road cycling
Representing Colombia
Pan American Championships
Gold medal – first place	1984 Duitama	Road race

Ramón Jesús Tolosa Calvo (4 May 1960 – 29 August 2025) was a Colombian road cyclist. He competed at the 1984 Pan American Road Championships, winning the gold medal in the men's road race event.

Tolosa died in Ibagué on 29 August 2025, at the age of 65.

== Major results ==
1982
1st Stage 6 Vuelta a Guatemala
1983
3rd Overall Clásico RCN
3rd Overall Clásica de Cundinamarca
1984
Pan American Road Championships

1st Road race
3rd Team time trial

1st Prologue Vuelta a Colombia
