= Patricio Almonacid =

Chilean road bicycle racer (born 1979)

Personal information
- Full name: Patricio Javier Almonacid González
- Born: September 11, 1979 (age 47) Puerto Montt, Chile
- Height: 1.66 m (5 ft 5 in)
- Weight: 60 kg (130 lb)

Cycling career
- Sport: Cycling
- Discipline: Road
- Role: Rider

Amateur teams
- 2009: OGM
- 2010–2011: T Banc–Skechers
- 2012: Clos de Pirque–Trek
- 2014: Clos de Pirque–Trek
- 2015–2016: Black Sheep–Puerto Montt
- 2016: Trek–Subaru
- 2017–2018: Cycling Adventure Chilenazo

Professional team
- 2013: Clos de Pirque–Trek

Patricio Javier Almonacid González (born September 11, 1979, in Puerto Montt, Los Lagos Region) is a Chilean professional road bicycle racer. He competed in the road race at the 2008 Summer Olympics but failed to finish the race.

== Major results ==
2007
7th Time trial, Pan American Road Championships
2008
3rd Road race, National Road Championships
2011
8th Overall Vuelta Ciclista de Chile
10th Overall Volta Ciclística Internacional do Rio Grande do Sul
2012
1st Overall Vuelta Ciclista de Chile

1st Stages 1 (TTT) & 4

2014
2nd Overall Volta do Paraná
10th Time trial, Pan American Road Championships
2015
1st Points classification Vuelta Mexico Telmex
3rd Time trial, National Road Championships
2016
3rd Time trial, National Road Championships
4th Time trial, Pan American Road Championships
2017
3rd Time trial, Bolivarian Games
3rd Road race, National Road Championships
7th Overall Vuelta Ciclista de Chile
