= Maribel Aguirre =

Argentine cyclist

Personal information
- Born: 15 May 1999 (age 27) San Juan, Argentina

Cycling career
- Sport: Cycling
- Role: Rider
Medal record
Women's track cycling
Representing Argentina
Pan American Championships
Silver medal – second place	2026 Santiago	Omnium
Bronze medal – third place	2019 Cochabamba	Omnium
South American Games
Silver medal – second place	2022 Asunción	Madison
Bronze medal – third place	2026 Santa Fe	Madison
Junior Pan American Games
Bronze medal – third place	2021 Cali-Valle	Omnium

Maribel Aguirre (born 15 May 1999) is an Argentine racing cyclist. In 2018, she won the Women's National Road Race Championship in Argentina.
