= Cycling at the 2014 South American Games =

There were four cycling events at the 2014 South American Games: road cycling, track cycling, mountain bike and BMX racing, adding up to 28 events.

== Medal summary ==
=== Medal table ===
* Host nation (Chile)

Rank	Nation	Gold	Silver	Bronze	Total
1	Colombia (COL)	8	6	5	19
2	Brazil (BRA)	4	3	4	11
3	Venezuela (VEN)	3	5	4	12
4	Chile (CHI)*	2	1	0	3
5	Argentina (ARG)	1	3	5	9
Totals (5 entries)		18	18	18	54

=== Road cycling ===
Event	Gold	Silver	Bronze
Men's events
Men's road race	Gonzalo Garrido; Chile	Luis Felipe Laverde; Colombia	Jackson Rodríguez; Venezuela
Men's time trial	Murilo Affonso; Brazil	Carlos Oyarzún; Chile	Brayan Ramírez; Colombia
Women's events
Women's road race	Paola Muñoz; Chile	Jennifer Cesar; Venezuela	Diana Peñuela; Colombia
Women's time trial	Fernanda Da Silva; Brazil	María Luisa Calle; Colombia	Clemilda Fernandes; Brazil

=== Track cycling ===
Event	Gold	Silver	Bronze
Men's events
Men's team pursuit	Juan Esteban Arango; Arles Castro; Edwin Ávila; Weimar Roldán; Colombia	Mauro Agostini; Walter Pérez; Adrián Richeze; Mauro Richeze; Juan Merlos; Argentina	Richard Ochoa; Manuel Briceño; Víctor Moreno; Clever Martínez; Venezuela
Men's individual sprint	Fabián Puerta; Colombia	Hersony Canelón; Venezuela	Flávio Cipriano; Brazil
Men's team sprint	César Marcano; Hersony Canelón; Ángel Pulgar; Venezuela	Rubén Murillo; Fabián Puerta; Santiago Ramírez; Colombia	Flávio Cipriano; Kacio Fonseca; Dieferson Borges; Brazil
Men's Keirin	Fabián Puerta; Colombia	Hersony Canelón; Venezuela	Leandro Bottasso; Argentina
Men's Omnium	Fernando Gaviria; Colombia	Juan Esteban Arango; Colombia	Máximo Rojas; Venezuela
Women's events
Women's individual sprint	Daniela Larreal; Venezuela	Juliana Gaviria; Colombia	Diana García; Colombia
Women's team sprint	Daniela Larreal; Mariaesthela Vilera; Venezuela	Diana García; Juliana Gaviria; Colombia	Gabriela Yumi; Wellyda Rodrigues; Brazil
Women's Keirin	Juliana Gaviria; Colombia	Daniela Larreal; Venezuela	Diana García; Colombia

=== Mountain biking ===
Event	Gold	Silver	Bronze
Men's event
Men's cross-country	Henrique Avancini; Brazil	Rubens Donizete; Brazil	Catriel Soto; Argentina
Women's event
Women's cross-country	Agustina Apaza; Argentina	Raiza Goulão; Brazil	Ángela Parra; Colombia

- 4th place in the men's mountain biking was Colombia.

=== BMX ===
Event	Gold	Silver	Bronze
Men's events
Time Trial	Carlos Oquendo; Colombia	Renato Rezende; Brazil	Matías Montenegro; Argentina
BMX	Renato Rezende; Brazil	Federico Villegas; Argentina	Gonzalo Molina; Argentina
Women's events
Time Trial	Mariana Pajón; Colombia	Gabriela Díaz; Argentina	Stefany Hernández; Venezuela
BMX	Mariana Pajón; Colombia	Stefany Hernández; Venezuela	Gabriela Díaz; Argentina
