= Catalina Soto =

Chilean cyclist

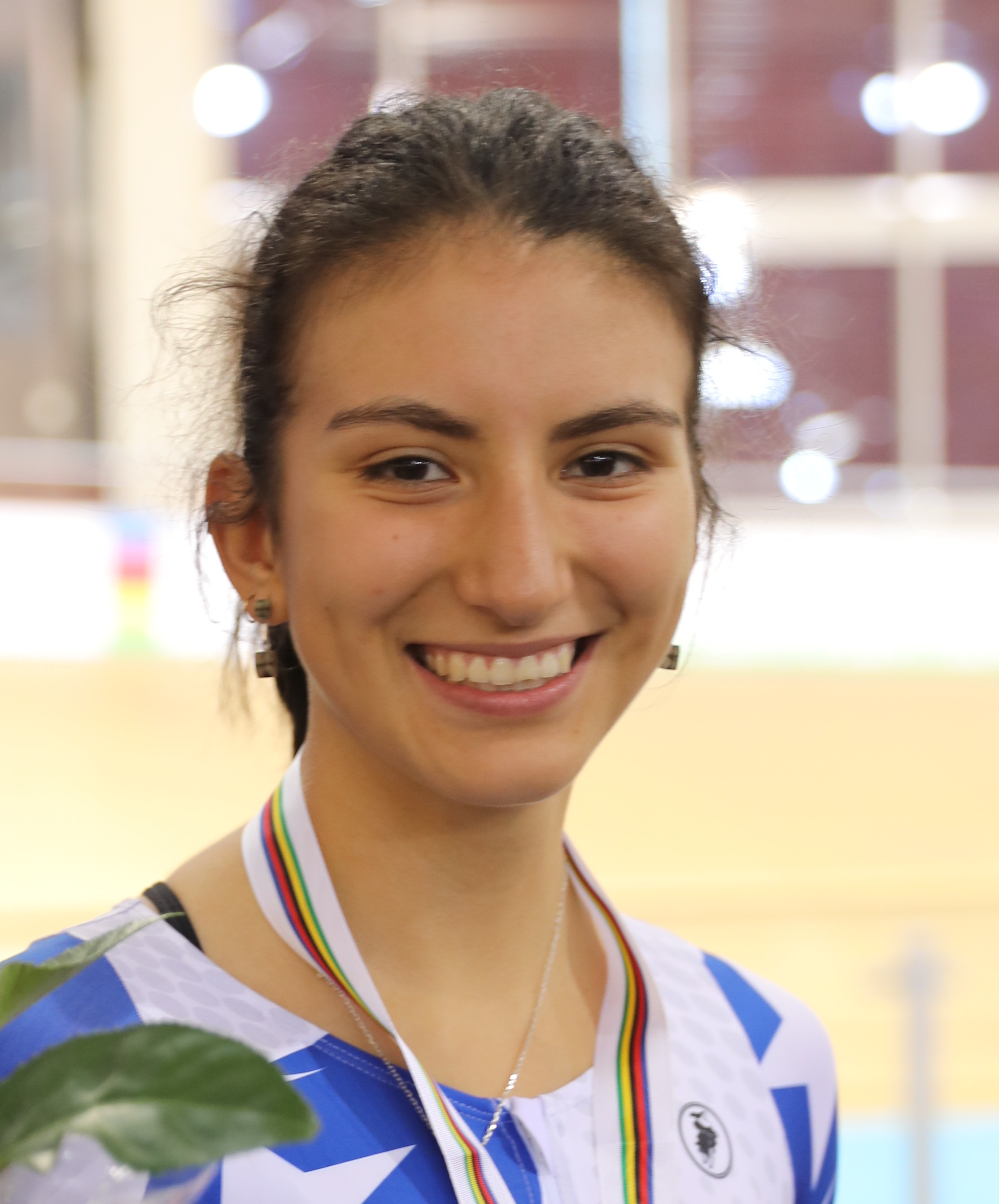
- Soto in 2019

Personal information
- Full name: Catalina Anais Soto Campos
- Born: 8 April 2001 (age 25) Santiago, Chile

Cycling career
- Sport: Cycling
- Current team: Laboral Kutxa–Fundación Euskadi
- Disciplines: Road; Track
- Role: Rider

Professional teams
- 2020: WCC Team
- 2021: NXTG Racing
- 2022–2023: Bizkaia–Durango
- 2024–: Laboral Kutxa–Fundación Euskadi
Medal record
Representing Chile
Women's track cycling
Pan American Games
Bronze medal – third place	2023 Santiago	Omnium
World Junior Championships
Silver medal – second place	2019 Frankfurt	Scratch
Junior Pan American Games
Bronze medal – third place	2021 Cali-Valle	Madison
Bronze medal – third place	2021 Cali-Valle	Team Pursuit
Women's road bicycle racing
Pan American Championships
Gold medal – first place	2026 Montería	Road race
Silver medal – second place	2022 San Juan	Road race
Bronze medal – third place	2023 Panama City	Road race
Bronze medal – third place	2024 São José dos Campos	Road race

Catalina Anais Soto Campos (born 8 April 2001) is a Chilean professional racing cyclist, who currently rides for UCI Women's ProTeam Laboral Kutxa–Fundación Euskadi. She rode in the women's time trial event at the 2020 UCI Road World Championships. In June 2021, she qualified to represent Chile at the 2020 Summer Olympics.

== Major results ==
2019
National Junior Road Championships

1st Road race
1st Time trial

2nd Scratch, UCI Junior Track World Championships
2021
4th Road race, Junior Pan American Games
2022
1st Time trial, National Road Championships
Pan American Road Championships

2nd Road race
6th Time trial

Bolivarian Games

5th Road race
5th Time trial

2023
National Road Championships

2nd Time trial
4th Road race

Pan American Games

3rd Omnium
7th Road race

Pan American Road Championships

3rd Road race
4th Time trial

2024
National Road Championships

2nd Time trial
3rd Road race

2nd Pioniera Race
Pan American Road Championships

3rd Road race
6th Time trial

6th Clásica de Almería
8th La Picto–Charentaise
9th La Périgord Ladies
2025
5th Vuelta CV Feminas
8th Trofeo Binissalem-Andratx
9th Clásica de Almería

2026
1st Road race, Pan American Road Championships
