= Daniela Guajardo =

Chilean cyclist (born 1990)

Personal information
- Full name: Daniela Andrea Guajardo Cornejo
- Born: 23 June 1990 (age 36) Curicó, Chile

Cycling career
- Sport: Cycling
- Disciplines: Road; Track
- Role: Rider

Amateur team
- 2015: Bontrager
Medal record
Representing Chile
Women's track cycling
Pan American Track Championships
Silver medal – second place	2008 Montevideo	Team sprint
Silver medal – second place	2012 Mar del Plata	Scratch
Bronze medal – third place	2012 Mar del Plata	Points race
Bronze medal – third place	2014 Aguascalientes	Scratch
Bronze medal – third place	2015 Santiago	Team pursuit
Bronze medal – third place	2021 Lima	Team pursuit

Daniela Andrea Guajardo Cornejo (born 23 June 1990) is a Chilean road and track cyclist.

== Major results ==
2008
1st Road race, National Junior Road Championships
2nd Team sprint, Pan American Track Championships
2012
Pan American Track Championships

2nd Scratch
3rd Points race

2014
1st Time trial, National Road Championships
Copa Internacional de Pista

1st Points race
3rd Individual pursuit

3rd Scratch, Pan American Track Championships
10th Time trial, Pan American Road Championships
2015
1st Time trial, National Road Championships
3rd Team pursuit, Pan American Track Championships (with Denisse Ahumada, Valentina Monsalve Giraudo and Flor Palma)
3rd Copa Federación Venezolana de Ciclismo
2017
3rd Team pursuit, Bolivarian Games
2021
3rd Team pursuit, Pan American Track Championships
