= Agua Marina Espínola =

Paraguayan cyclist (born 1996)

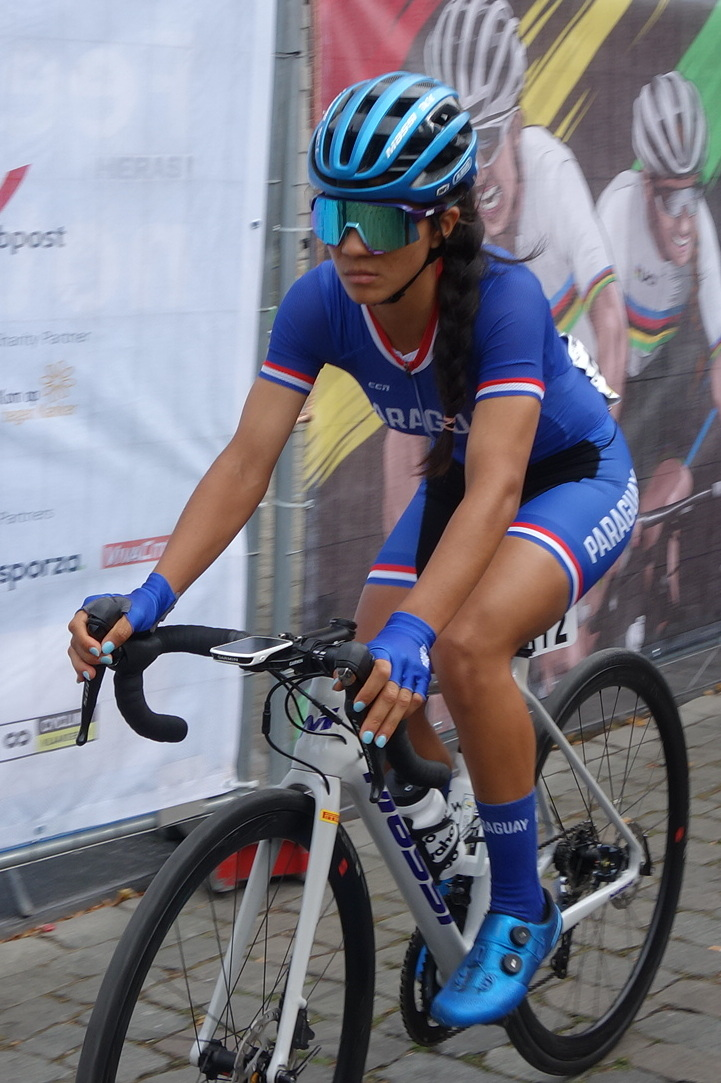
- Espínola at the 2021 UCI Road World Championships

Personal information
- Full name: Agua Marina Espínola Salinas
- Born: 31 March 1996 (age 30) Asunción, Paraguay

Cycling career
- Sport: Cycling
- Current team: Primeau Vélo - Groupe Abadie
- Discipline: Road
- Role: Rider

Amateur teams
- 2018: UCI WCC Women's Team
- 2018: Cogeas–Mettler Pro Cycling Team (stagiaire)

Professional teams
- 2019: WCC Team
- 2020–2021: Massi–Tactic
- 2022–2023: Canyon–SRAM Generation
- 2024–: Primeau Vélo - Groupe Abadie
Medal record
Women's road bicycle racing
Representing Paraguay
Pan American Games
Bronze medal – third place	2023 Santiago	Road race
South American Games
Silver medal – second place	2026 Santa Fe	Time trial

Agua Marina Espínola Salinas (born 31 March 1996) is a Paraguayan cyclist, who currently rides for UCI Women's Continental Team Primeau Vélo - Groupe Abadie.

She qualified for the 2020 Summer Olympics, becoming the first cyclist from her country ever to do so.

== Major results ==
2013
10th Time trial, Pan American Junior Road Championships
2014
National Road Championships

1st Road race
1st Time trial

Pan American Junior Road Championships

4th Road race
5th Time trial

2015
National Road Championships

1st Road race
1st Time trial

2016
National Road Championships

1st Road race
1st Time trial

2019
8th Time trial, Pan American Road Championships
2020
National Road Championships

1st Road race
1st Time trial

2022
1st Time trial, South American Games
2nd Overall Vuelta a Formosa Femenina
8th Overall Princess Anna Vasa Tour
2023
National Road Championships

1st Road race
1st Time trial

Pan American Games

3rd Road race
5th Time trial

4th Gran Premio Cidade De Pontevedra
5th Time trial, Pan American Road Championships
