= Carlos Oyarzún =

Chilean road cyclist

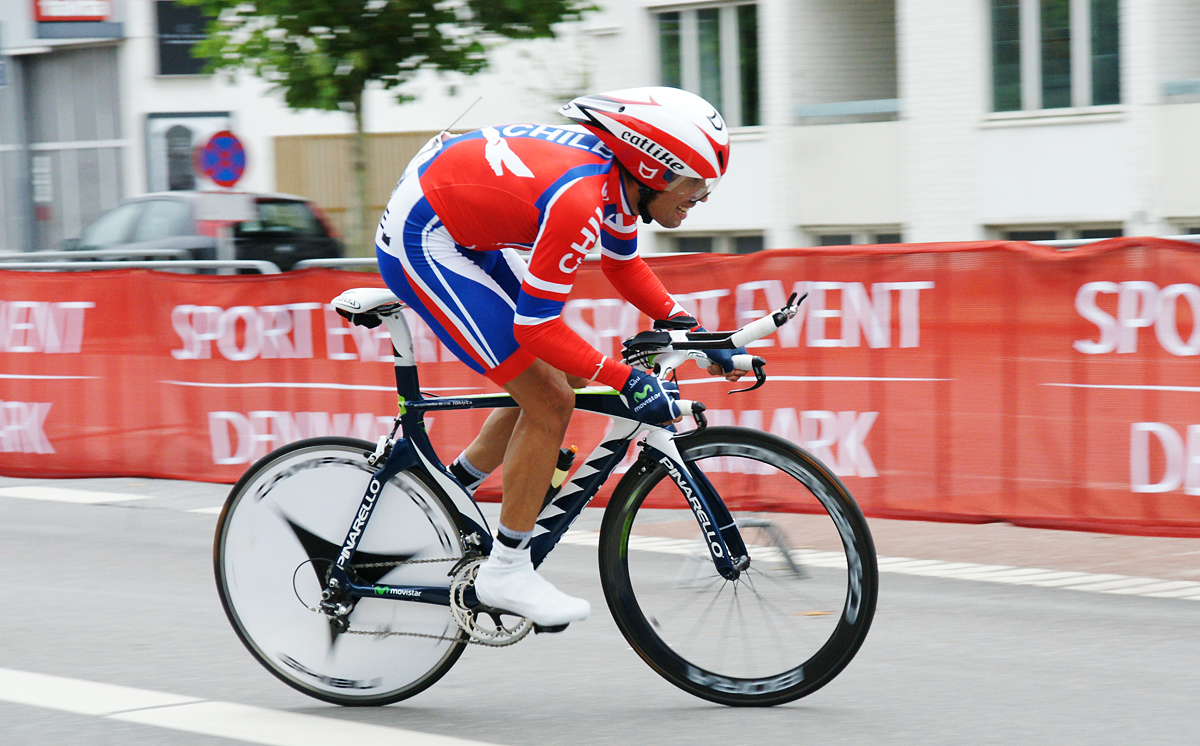
- Oyarzun riding in the 2011 UCI Road World Championships – Men's time trial

Personal information
- Full name: Carlos Iván Oyarzún Guíñez
- Born: 26 October 1981 (age 44) Santiago, Chile
- Height: 1.77 m (5 ft 10 in)
- Weight: 66 kg (146 lb)

Cycling career
- Sport: Cycling
- Current team: Aviludo–Louletano–Loulé
- Discipline: Road
- Role: Rider
- Rider type: Climber

Amateur teams
- 2005: Roper–Camargo
- 2006: Ciudad de Oviedo
- 2007: Diputación de León
- 2009–2010: Super Froiz
- 2012: Triciclo–USM

Professional teams
- 2008: Tecos
- 2011: Movistar Team
- 2012: J.Jensen–Sandstød Salg Og Event
- 2013: Louletano–Dunas Douradas
- 2014: Efapel–Glassdrive
- 2015: Keith Mobel–Partizan
- 2019–2020: BAI–Sicasal–Petro de Luanda
- 2021–: Louletano–Loulé Concelho

Major wins
- National Road Race Championships (2012); National Time Trial Championships (2012)
Medal record
Representing Chile
Men's road bicycle racing
Pan American Games
Bronze medal – third place	2011 Guadalajara	Time trial
Pan American Championships
Gold medal – first place	2010 Aguascalientes	Road race
Gold medal – first place	2013 Zacatecas	Time trial
Gold medal – first place	2015 León	Time trial
Silver medal – second place	2010 Aguascalientes	Time trial
Bronze medal – third place	2014 Puebla	Time trial

Carlos Iván Oyarzún Guíñez (born 26 October 1981) is a Chilean professional road cyclist, who currently rides for UCI Continental team Aviludo–Louletano–Loulé. Oyarzun has also rode for UCI ProTeam Movistar Team.

== Doping ==
On 20 July 2015 the Chilean Olympic Committee announced that Oyarzun had been sent home from the 2015 Pan American Games in Toronto after he had tested positive for the HIF prolyl-hydroxylase inhibitor FG-4592 in a pre-competition test. Oyarzun was at the Games to ride the time trial, but was sent home prior to the event.

== Major results ==
2008
1st Overall Tour of Belize

1st Stage 1

2009
7th Overall Circuito Montañés
2010
Pan American Road Championships

1st Road race
2nd Time trial

2nd Overall Circuito Montañés

1st Stage 1

2011
3rd Time trial, Pan American Games
2012
National Road Championships

1st Road race
1st Time trial

6th Chrono des Nations
2013
Pan American Road Championships

1st Time trial
10th Road race

5th Overall Volta ao Alentejo
6th Chrono des Nations
2014
2nd Time trial, South American Games
Pan American Road Championships

3rd Time trial
7th Road race

4th Chrono des Nations
2015
1st Time trial, Pan American Road Championships
1st Overall Vuelta del Uruguay

1st Stage 9 (ITT)

6th Overall Troféu Joaquim Agostinho
7th Overall Volta Ciclística Internacional do Rio Grande do Sul

1st Stage 2

2020
7th Overall La Tropicale Amissa Bongo

== See also ==
- List of doping cases in cycling
