= Raiza Goulão =

Brazilian cyclist (born 1991)

Personal information
- Full name: Raiza Goulão Henrique
- Born: 28 February 1991 (age 35) Pirenópolis, Brazil

Cycling career
- Sport: Cycling
Medal record
Representing Brazil
Women's mountain bike racing
Pan American Games
Bronze medal – third place	2023 Santiago	Cross-country
South American Games
Gold medal – first place	2022 Asunción	Cross-country
Silver medal – second place	2014 Santiago	Cross-country

Raiza Goulão (born 28 February 1991) is a Brazilian cross-country cyclist. She placed 20th in the women's cross-country race at the 2016 Summer Olympics.
