= Rubén Pegorín =

Argentine cyclist

Personal information
- Born: 28 April 1965 (age 61)

Cycling career
- Sport: Cycling

Rubén Pegorín (born 28 April 1965) is an Argentine cyclist. He competed in the men's individual road race at the 1996 Summer Olympics.
