= Paola Muñoz =

Chilean cyclist

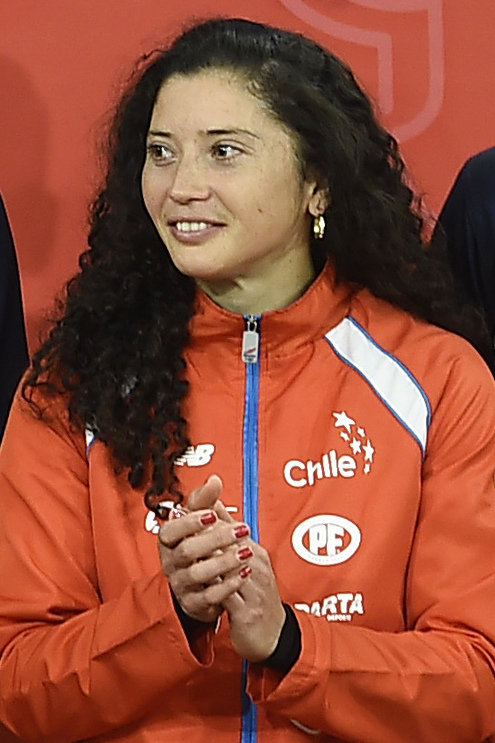

Personal information
- Full name: Paola Andrea Muñoz Grandón
- Born: 13 April 1986 (age 40) Santiago, Chile

Cycling career
- Sport: Cycling
- Disciplines: Road; Track
- Role: Rider

Amateur team
- 2008: Pratomagno Colombia (guest)

Professional teams
- 2012: Bizkaia–Durango
- 2016: Xirayas de San Luis–OPW
- 2017: Bizkaia–Durango
- 2018–2019: Swapit–Agolíco

Major wins
- One day races & Classics National Road Race Championships (2007–2009, 2012, 2014, 2017) Pan American Road Race Championships (2017)
Medal record
Representing Chile
Women's track cycling
Pan American Championships
Gold medal – first place	2012 Mar del Plata	Points race
Silver medal – second place	2016 Aguascalientes	Scratch
Bronze medal – third place	2004 Cojedes	Scratch
Bronze medal – third place	2010 Aguascalientes	Scratch
Bronze medal – third place	2016 Aguascalientes	Team pursuit
Bronze medal – third place	2021 Lima	Team pursuit
Women's road cycling
Pan American Championships
Gold medal – first place	2017 Santo Domingo	Road race
Silver medal – second place	2009 Mexico City	Road race
Silver medal – second place	2021 Santo Domingo	Road race

Paola Andrea Muñoz Grandón (born April 13, 1986) is a Chilean road bicycle racer, who most recently rode for UCI Women's Team Swapit–Agolíco. She competed at the 2012 Summer Olympics in the Women's road race, and the 2016 Summer Olympics.

== Major results ==
2004
3rd Scratch, Pan American Track Championships
2007
1st Road race, National Road Championships
7th Road race, Pan American Games
9th Road race, Pan American Road Championships
2008
National Road Championships

1st Road race
6th Time trial

2009
2nd Road race, Pan American Road Championships
6th Copa America de Ciclismo
2010
1st Road race, National Road Championships
3rd Scratch, Pan American Track Championships
7th Road race, South American Games
2011
1st Wenduine
1st Zonnebeke
3rd Leeuwergem
4th Muizen
7th Finale Lotto Cycling Cup - Breendonk
8th Road race, Pan American Games
2012
1st Points race, Pan American Track Championships
1st Road race, National Road Championships
8th Road race, Pan American Road Championships
2013
Bolivarian Games

3rd Omnium
3rd Team pursuit

2014
1st Road race, South American Games
1st Road race, National Road Championships
2015
1st Clasico FVCiclismo Corre Por la VIDA
National Road Championships

3rd Road race
3rd Time trial

Copa Venezuela

3rd Omnium
3rd Points race

6th Road race, Pan American Games
8th Copa Federación Venezolana de Ciclismo
2016
1st Road race, East Flanders Provincial Road Championships
1st Gran Premio de Venezuela
Pan American Track Championships

2nd Scratch
3rd Team pursuit (with Carolina Andrea Oyarzo, Constanza Paredes and Javiera Reyes)

2nd Zizurkil-Villabona Sari Nagusia
4th Road race, National Road Championships
4th Clasico FVCiclismo Corre Por la VIDA
6th Grand Prix de Venezuela
9th Gran Prix San Luis Femenino
10th Copa Federación Venezolana de Ciclismo
2017
1st Road race, Pan American Road Championships
1st Road race, National Road Championships
1st Premio Comunidad de Cantabria
1st Stage 4 Vuelta Internacional Femenina a Costa Rica
6th Road race, Bolivarian Games
2018
Vuelta Femenina a Guatemala

1st Points classification
1st Stage 4

6th Road race, Pan American Road Championships
8th Gran Premio ICODER
9th Gran Premio Comite Olimpico Nacional Femenino
2019
National Road Championships

4th Road race
5th Time trial

2021
2nd Road race, Pan American Road Championships
3rd Team pursuit, Pan American Track Championships
2022
Vuelta a Formosa Femenina

1st Stage 1
1st Points classification

10th Road Race Juegos Suramericanos
