= Nicolás Torres (BMX cyclist) =

Argentine cyclist

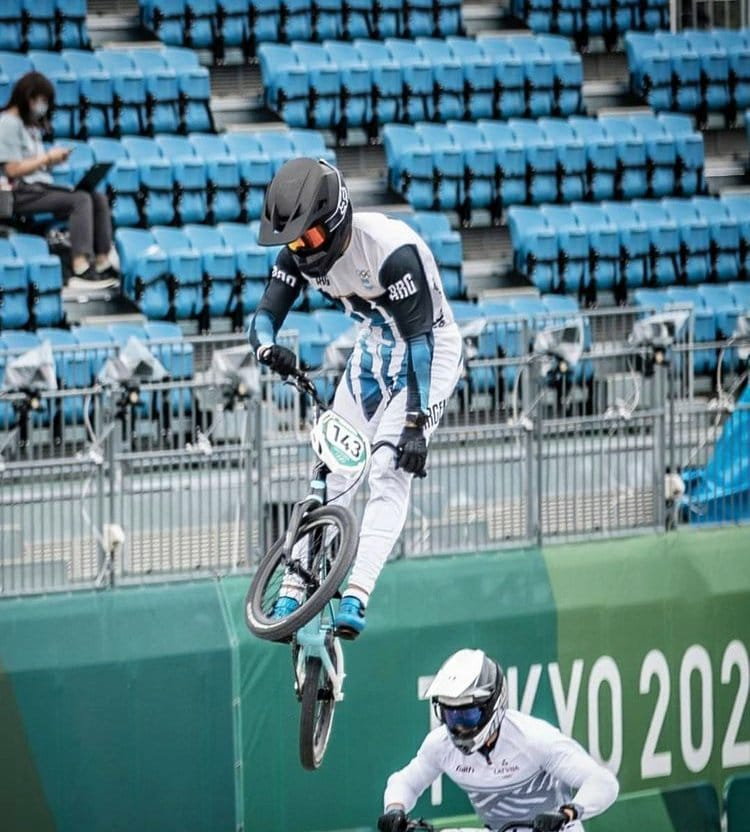
Nicolás Torres at the 2020 Summer Olympics

Nicolás Exequiel Torres (born 9 September 1997 in La Rioja, Argentina) is an Argentine BMX (bicycle motocross) cyclist.

He took part in the 2014 Summer Youth Olympics BMX event in Nanjing, China. He was the 2015 UCI BMX World Championships Junior World Champion. Torres was selected in the Argentinian team for the Cycling at the 2020 Summer Olympics – Men's BMX racing.
