= Aranza Villalón =

Chilean cyclist

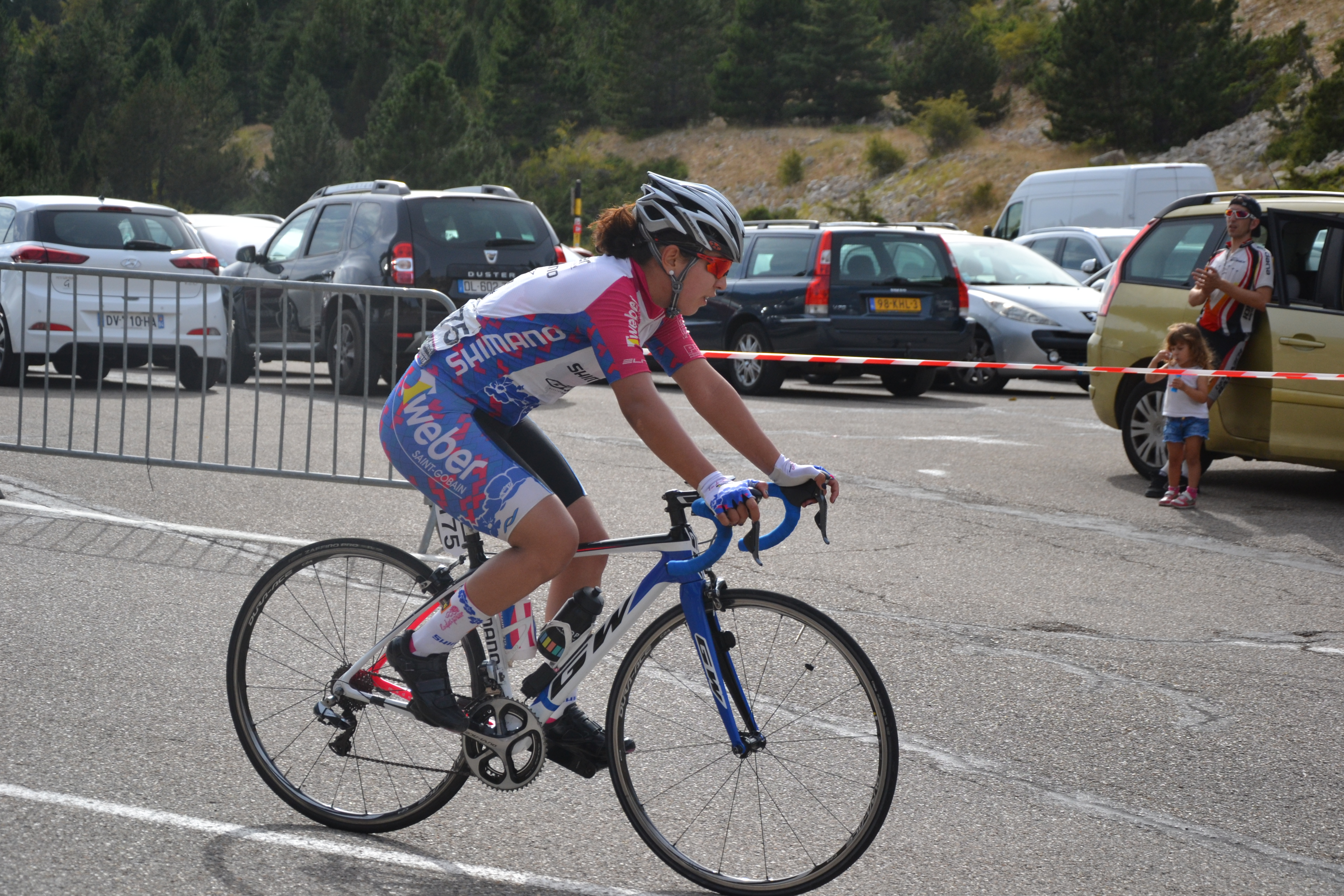
- Villalón in 2016

Personal information
- Full name: Aranza Valentina Villalón Sánchez
- Born: 16 June 1995 (age 31)

Cycling career
- Sport: Cycling
- Current team: Soltec Iberoamérica
- Disciplines: Road; Track
- Role: Rider

Amateur team
- 2019–2020: Avinal–GW–El Carmen de Viboral

Professional teams
- 2015–2017: Itau Shimano Ladies Power Team
- 2022–2023: Eneicat–RBH Global–Martín Villa
- 2024–: Soltec Iberoamérica

Major wins
- One day races & Classics National Road Race Championships (2018, 2021) National Time Trial Championships (2016–2018, 2021, 2023)
Medal record
Representing Chile
Women's road bicycle racing
Pan American Games
Bronze medal – third place	2023 Santiago	Time trial
Pan American Championships
Silver medal – second place	2023 Panama City	Time trial
Bronze medal – third place	2021 Santo Domingo	Time trial
Bronze medal – third place	2024 São José dos Campos	Time trial
South American Games
Gold medal – first place	2026 Santa Fe	Time trial
Women's track cycling
Pan American Championships
Silver medal – second place	2024 Carson	Individual pursuit
Bronze medal – third place	2021 Lima	Team pursuit
South American Games
Silver medal – second place	2026 Santa Fe	Madison
Silver medal – second place	2026 Santa Fe	Team pursuit

Aranza Valentina Villalón Sánchez (born 16 June 1995) is a Chilean professional racing cyclist, who rides for UCI Women's Continental Team Soltec Iberoamérica.

== Major results ==
2015
5th 9 de Julho
7th Overall Armed Forces Association Cycling Classic
2016
National Road Championships

1st Time trial
6th Road race

1st Overall Vuelta a la Prov. de Buenos Aires

1st Stage 1

7th Gran Premio de Venezuela
8th Grand Prix de Venezuela
9th Overall Tour Femenino de San Luis

1st Young rider classification

2017
Bolivarian Games

1st Time trial
7th Road race

1st Time trial, National Road Championships
1st Overall Vuelta de La Pampa

1st Stages 1, 2 (ITT) & 3

2nd Overall Tour Internacional Femenino de Uruguay

1st Stage 3 (ITT)

5th Time trial, Pan American Road Championships
2018
National Road Championships

1st Road race
1st Time trial

1st Overall Vuelta Femenina a San Juan

1st Stages 1, 2 (ITT) & 3

5th Time trial, Pan American Road Championships
South American Games

5th Time trial
8th Road race

2019
1st Overall Vuelta a Colombia Femenina

1st Stage 4 (ITT)

1st Overall Vuelta Femenino del Porvenir

1st Stage 4 (ITT)

National Road Championships

2nd Road race
3rd Time trial

2nd Overall Vuelta Antioquia Femenina

1st Stages 1, 2 & 3

8th Overall Vuelta Femenina a Guatemala
9th Time trial, Pan American Games
2021
National Road Championships

1st Road race
1st Time trial

2nd Overall Vuelta a Colombia Femenina

1st Stage 2

3rd Team pursuit, Pan American Track Championships
3rd Time trial, Pan American Road Championships
2022
3rd Time trial, National Road Championships
1st Overall Vuelta a Formosa Femenina

1st Stage 3a (ITT)

South American Games

3rd Road race
6th Time trial

2023
National Road Championships

1st Time trial
5th Road Race

Pan American Road Championships

2nd Time trial
7th Road Race

4th Trofeo del Bajo Andarax
9th Vuelta CV Feminas
2024
National Road Championships

1st Time trial
2nd Road Race

1st Grand Prix MOPT
3rd Time trial, Pan American Road Championships
