= Gonzalo Molina =

Argentine BMX rider (born 1995)

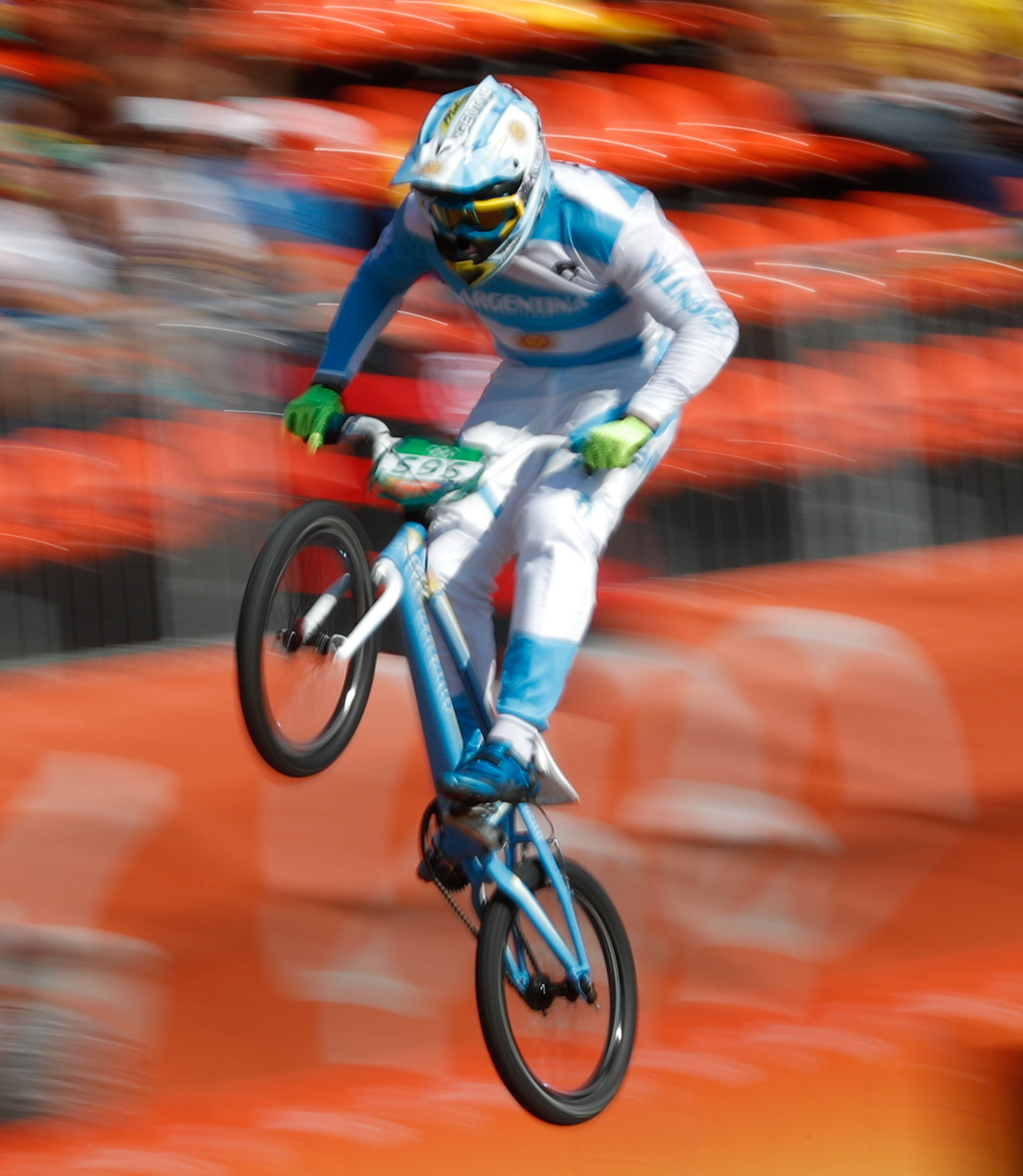
- Molina at the 2016 Summer Olympics

Personal information
- Born: 5 May 1995 (age 31) San Juan, Argentina
- Height: 1.78 m (5 ft 10 in)
- Weight: 83 kg (183 lb)

Cycling career
- Sport: Cycling
- Current team: Argentina
- Discipline: BMX racing
- Role: Rider
Medal record
Representing Argentina
Men's BMX racing
Event	1st	2nd	3rd
World Junior Championships	0	1	0
Pan American Championships	1	2	1
South American Games	0	2	1
Pan American Junior Championships	0	0	1
Total	1	5	3
Pan American Championships
Gold medal – first place	2016 Santiago del Estero	BMX racing
Silver medal – second place	2017 Santiago del Estero	BMX racing
Silver medal – second place	2025 Chillán	BMX racing
Bronze medal – third place	2021 Lima	BMX racing
South American Games
Silver medal – second place	2018 Cochabamba	BMX racing
Silver medal – second place	2026 Santa Fe	BMX racing
Bronze medal – third place	2014 Santiago	BMX racing
World Junior Championships
Silver medal – second place	2013 Auckland	BMX racing
Pan American Junior Championships
Bronze medal – third place	2013 Santiago del Estero	BMX racing

Gonzalo Molina (born 5 May 1995) is an Argentine male BMX rider, representing his nation in international competitions. He competed in the time trial event at the 2015 UCI BMX World Championships.

Molina was selected as part of the Argentine cycling team for the 2016 Summer Olympics in Rio de Janeiro, competing in the men's BMX race. After he grabbed a twenty-ninth seed on the opening round with a time of 36.860 and then finished fourth in the quarterfinals, Molina scored a total of 16 placing points to take the sixth spot in his semifinal heat, thus missing out on a chance to compete for the medals at the final race.
