= Diego Ferreyra =

Chilean cyclist

Personal information
- Full name: Diego Agustín Ferreyra Geldrez
- Born: 14 October 1997 (age 29)

Cycling career
- Sport: Cycling
- Disciplines: Road, Track
Medal record
Men's track cycling
Representing Chile
Pan American Track Cycling Championships
Bronze medal – third place	2016 Aguascalientes	Team pursuit

Diego Ferreyra (born 14 October 1997) is a Chilean road and track cyclist.

He won a bronze medal at the 2016 Pan American Track Cycling Championships in the team pursuit.

== Major results ==
2015
1st Junior National Time Trial Championships
2016
3rd Team pursuit, Pan American Track Championships
2017
1st Under–23 National Time Trial Championships
2018
1st Time trial, Pan American Under–23 Road Championships
2019
1st Time trial, Pan American Under–23 Road Championships
