= Manuel Aravena =

Chilean cyclist (born 1954)

Personal information
- Born: 29 June 1954 (age 72)

Cycling career
- Sport: Cycling

Manuel Aravena González (born 29 June 1954) is a Chilean former cyclist. He received ninth place in the individual road race at the 1975 Pan American Games.

He competed in the individual road race event at the 1984 Summer Olympics, but was unable to finish after being injured in a collision on the course.
