= Denisse Ahumada =

Chilean cyclist (born 1993)

Personal information
- Full name: Denisse Aracely Ahumada Riquelme
- Born: 8 April 1993 (age 33)

Cycling career
- Sport: Cycling
- Current team: Memorial Santos–SaddleDrunk
- Discipline: Road
- Role: Rider

Professional teams
- 2020: Agolíco–BMC–PatoBike
- 2021–: Memorial Santos–SaddleDrunk
Medal record
Women's road bicycle racing
Representing Chile
Pan American Championships
Silver medal – second place	2019 Ixmiquilpan	Road race

Denisse Aracely Ahumada Riquelme (born 8 April 1993) is a Chilean professional racing cyclist, who currently rides for UCI Women's Continental Team Memorial Santos–SaddleDrunk. She rode in the women's road race at the 2019 UCI Road World Championships in Yorkshire, England.

== Major results ==
2015
1st Road race, National Road Championships
2019
National Road Championships

1st Road race
2nd Time trial

2nd Road race, Pan American Road Championships
4th Road race, Pan American Games
7th Overall Vuelta Femenina a Guatemala
