= Gonzalo Garrido =

Chilean cyclist (born 1973)

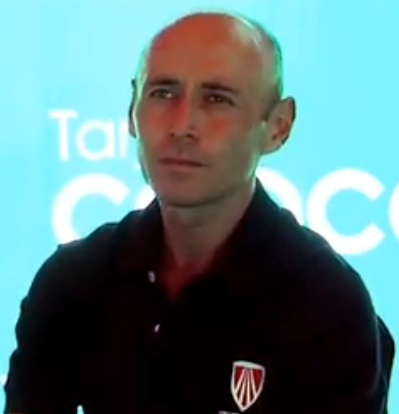
- In a 2014 interview

Personal information
- Full name: Gonzalo Andrés Garrido Zenteno
- Born: 2 September 1973 (age 53) Concepción, Chile
- Height: 1.74 m (5 ft 9 in)
- Weight: 68 kg (150 lb)

Cycling career
- Sport: Cycling
- Discipline: Road
- Role: Rider

Amateur team
- 2012: Clos de Pirque–Trek

Professional team
- 2013: Clos de Pirque–Trek
Medal record
Men's road bicycle racing
Representing Chile
Pan American Championships
Silver medal – second place	2011 Medellín	Road race

Gonzalo Andrés Garrido Zenteno (born 2 September 1973) is a Chilean road bicycle racer. He competed at the 2012 Summer Olympics in the Men's road race. He is a five-time National Champion.

== Major results ==
1997
3rd Road race, National Road Championships
1999
3rd Road race, National Road Championships
2000
2nd Road race, National Road Championships
2003
1st Road race, National Road Championships
2004
3rd Road race, National Road Championships
2006
1st Road race, National Road Championships
2007
1st Road race, National Road Championships
2008
2nd Road race, National Road Championships
4th Road race, Pan American Road Championships
2011
National Road Championships

1st Road race
1st Time trial

1st Overall Vuelta Ciclista de Chile
2nd Road race, Pan American Road Championships
8th Overall Volta Ciclística Internacional de Gravatai
2012
1st Stage 1 Vuelta Ciclista a Costa Rica
3rd Overall Vuelta Ciclista de Chile

1st Mountains classification
1st Stage 1

2015
2nd Road race, National Road Championships
2016
7th Road race, Pan American Road Championships
2017
2nd Road race, National Road Championships
