= Stephanie Subercaseaux =

Chilean cyclist (1984–2023)

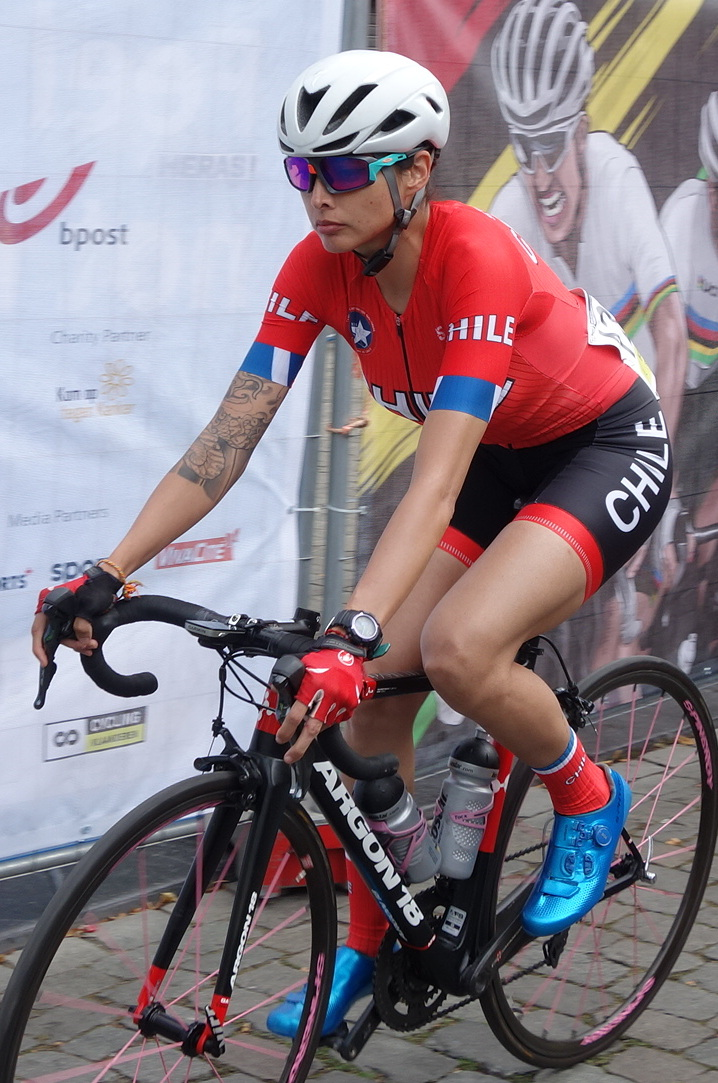
- Subercaseaux at the 2021 UCI Road World Championships

Personal information
- Full name: Stephanie Subercaseaux Vergara
- Born: 23 March 1984
- Died: 21 January 2023 (aged 38) Las Condes, Chile

Cycling career
- Sport: Cycling
- Discipline: Road
- Role: Rider

Professional team
- 2018–2019: Team Illuminate

Stephanie Subercaseaux Vergara (23 March 1984 – 21 January 2023) was a Chilean racing cyclist, who rode for UCI Women's Team Team Illuminate. She rode in the women's road race event at the 2018 UCI Road
