= Pan American Track Championships =

Annual track cycling championships

Pan American Track Cycling Championships
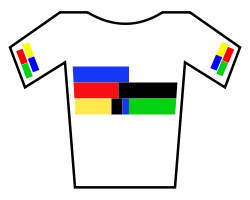
- The champion's jersey

Race details
- Region: North and South America
- Discipline: Road

History
- First edition: 1974

The Pan American Track Championships are the continental cycling championships for track cycling held annually for member nations of the Pan American Cycling Confederation. Riders competing in the Pan American Cycling Championships are selected by the national governing body.

== Men ==
=== Sprint ===
Year	(gold) Gold Medal	(silver) Silver Medal	(bronze) Bronze Medal
2002	(Barbados) Barry Forde	(Cuba) Julio César Herrera	(Cuba) Michel Pedroso
2004	(United States) Giddeon Massie	(Colombia) Jonathan Marín	(Venezuela) Alexander Cornieles
2005	(Barbados) Barry Forde	(United States) Kevin Belz	(United States) Michael Blatchford
2006	(United States) Stephen Alfred	(Canada) Travis Smith	(United States) Giddeon Massie
2007	(United States) Michael Blatchford	(Cuba) Julio César Herrera	(Colombia) Hernán Sánchez
2008	(Colombia) Jonathan Marín	(Colombia) Rodrigo Barros	(Trinidad and Tobago) Christopher Sellier
2009	(Colombia) Leonardo Narváez	(Canada) Travis Smith	(Cuba) Alejandro Mainat
2010			
2011			
2012			
2013			
2014			
2015			
2016	(Colombia) Fabián Puerta	(Suriname) Jair Tjon En Fa	(Colombia) Santiago Ramírez
2017	(Canada) Hugo Barrette	(Colombia) Fabián Puerta	(Suriname) Jair Tjon En Fa

=== 1 km Time Trial ===
Year	(gold) Gold Medal	(silver) Silver Medal	(bronze) Bronze Medal
2002	(Colombia) Wilson Meneses	(Cuba) Michel Pedroso	(Cuba) Julio Herrera
2004	(United States) Christian Stahl	(Venezuela) Alexander Cornieles	(United States) Adam Duvendeck
2005	(Colombia) Wilson Meneses	(Argentina) Sergio Guatto	(Canada) Travis Smith
2006	(Canada) Cam MacKinnon	(Cuba) Julio César Herrera	(Canada) Matt Barlee
2007	(Cuba) Ahmed López	(Chile) Pablo Seisdedos	(Cuba) Yasmani Poll
2008	(Colombia) Mejia Marzuki	(Trinidad and Tobago) Azikiwe Kellar	(Mexico) Carlos Carrasco
2009	(United States) Jimmy Watkins	(Colombia) Leonardo Narváez	(Canada) Travis Smith
2010			
2011			
2012			
2013			
2014			
2015			
2016	(Colombia) Santiago Ramírez	(Colombia) Diego Peña	(Canada) Stefan Ritter
2017	(Colombia) Fabián Puerta	(Colombia) Santiago Ramírez	(Trinidad and Tobago) Quincy Alexander

=== Keirin ===
Year	(gold) Gold Medal	(silver) Silver Medal	(bronze) Bronze Medal
2002	(Barbados) Barry Forde	(Colombia) Wilson Meneses	(Canada) Steen Madsen
2004	(United States) Giddeon Massie	(Venezuela) Rubén Osorio	(Colombia) Leonardo Narváez
2005	(Barbados) Barry Forde	(Guatemala) José Sochón	(United States) Kevin Belz
2006	(Argentina) Leandro Bottasso	(Canada) Travis Smith	(Jamaica) Ricardo Lynch
2007	(Cuba) Julio César Herrera	(Colombia) Hernán Sánchez	(Cuba) Ahmed López
2008	(Trinidad and Tobago) Christopher Sellier	(Argentina) Diego Vargas	(Trinidad and Tobago) Elisha Greene
2009	(Colombia) Jonathan Marín	(United States) Jimmy Watkins	(Colombia) Leonardo Narváez
2010			
2011			
2012			
2013			
2014			
2015			
2016	(Colombia) Fabián Puerta	(Argentina) Leandro Hernan Bottasso	(Trinidad and Tobago) Kwesi Browne
2017	(Colombia) Fabián Puerta	(Canada) Hugo Barrette	(Argentina) Leandro Bottasso

=== Scratch ===
Year	(gold) Gold Medal	(silver) Silver Medal	(bronze) Bronze Medal
2002	(Mexico) Juan de la Rosa	(Chile) Marcelo Arriagada	(Brazil) Marcos Novello
2005	(Argentina) Ángel Colla	(Chile) José Araven	(Argentina) Walter Pérez
2006	(Argentina) Walter Pérez	(Argentina) Ángel Colla	(Chile) José Aravena
2007	(Chile) Luis Mansilla	(Venezuela) Maximo Rojas	(Argentina) Cristian Clavero
2008	(Argentina) Ángel Dario Colla	(Chile) Luis Mansilla	(United States) Cody O'Reilly
2009	(Chile) Pablo Seisdedos	(Argentina) Ángel Dario Colla	(Mexico) Mario Contreras
2010			
2011			
2012			
2013			
2014			
2015			
2016	(Mexico) José Alfredo Santoyo	(United States) Zachary Kovalcik	(Barbados) Edwin Sutherland
2017	(Argentina) Hugo Angel Velazquez	(Colombia) Bryan Gómez	(Venezuela) Clever Martinez

=== Points Race ===
Year	(gold) Gold Medal	(silver) Silver Medal	(bronze) Bronze Medal
2002	(Chile) Marco Arriagada	(Chile) Luis Sepúlveda	(Brazil) Hernandes Quadri
2005	(Argentina) Juan Curuchet	(Chile) Marco Arriagada	(Colombia) John Parra
2006	(Venezuela) Andris Hernández	(Cuba) Michel Fernández	(Colombia) Jairo Pérez
2007	(Colombia) Arles Castro	(Venezuela) Andris Hernández	(Mexico) Carlos Hernández
2008	(Canada) Svein Tuft	(United States) Daniel Holloway	(Chile) Antonio Cabrera
2009	(Colombia) Juan Pablo Suarez	(Mexico) Carlos Manuel Santana	(Colombia) Jairo Pérez
2010			
2011			
2012			
2013			
2014			
2015			
2016	(Colombia) Juan Arango	(Guatemala) Manuel Ochoa	(Argentina) Rubén Ramos
2017	(United States) Eric Young	(Chile) Antonio Cabrera	(Colombia) Edwin Ávila

=== 4km Pursuit ===
Year	(gold) Gold Medal	(silver) Silver Medal	(bronze) Bronze Medal
2002	(Chile) Marco Arriagada	(Ecuador) Luca Barazutti	(Canada) Mark Ernsting
2005	(Argentina) Edgardo Simón	(Chile) Marco Arriagada	(United States) Brad Huff
2006	(Colombia) Carlos Alzate	(Colombia) Jairo Pérez	(Canada) Zachary Bell
2007	(Colombia) Carlos Alzate	(Venezuela) Tomás Gil	(Chile) Jorge Contreras
2008			
2009	(Colombia) Jairo Pérez	(Argentina) Fernando Antogna	(Colombia) Jaime Suaza
2010			
2011			
2012			
2013			
2014			
2015			
2016	(Colombia) Eduardo Estrada	(Canada) Jay Lamoureux	(Chile) Edison Bravo
2017	(Canada) Derek Gee	(Canada) Jay Lamoureux	(Mexico) Ignacio Prado

=== Madison ===
Year	(gold) Gold Medal	(silver) Silver Medal	(bronze) Bronze Medal
2002	Chile; Richard Rodríguez; Luis Fernando Sepúlveda	Mexico; Juan de la Rosa; José Sánchez	Uruguay; Milton Wynants; Tomás Margalef
2005	Argentina; Juan Curuchet; Walter Pérez	Chile; Enzo Cesario; Luis Fernando Sepúlveda	Colombia; José Serpa; Alexander González
2006	Argentina; Juan Curuchet; Walter Pérez	Chile; Enzo Cesario; Luis Sepúlveda	Brazil; Hernandes Quadri Jr; Mac Donald Fernandes
2007	United States; Brad Huff; Colby Pearce	Chile; Gonzalo Miranda; Luis Fernando Sepúlveda	Cuba; Michel Fernández; Yunier Alonso
2008	Canada; Zachary Bell; Svein Tuft	Chile; Gonzalo Miranda; Luis Fernando Sepúlveda	Colombia; Armando Cardenas; Carlos Urán
2009	Mexico; Luis Fernando Hernández; Ignacio Díaz	Brazil; Thiago Nardin; Marcos Novelo	Dominican Republic; Benigno de la Cruz; Rafael Merán
2010			
2011			
2012			
2013			
2014			
2015			
2016	Chile; Antonio Cabrera; Edison Bravo	Colombia; Eduardo Estrada; Jordan Parra	Argentina; Rubén Ramos; Sebastián Trillini
2017	United States; Zachary Carlson; Zak Kovalcik	Argentina; Tomas Contte; Sebastián Trillini	Colombia; Jordan Parra; Edwin Ávila

=== Omnium ===
Year	(gold) Gold Medal	(silver) Silver Medal	(bronze) Bronze Medal
2007	(United States) Brad Huff	(Colombia) Juan Arango	(Dominican Republic) Jorge Pérez
2008			
2009	(Cuba) Rubén Companioni	(Chile) Pablo Seisdedos	(Argentina) Ángel Dario Colla
2010			
2011			
2012			
2013			
2014	(Colombia) Juan Sebastián Molano	(Chile) Cristopher Mansilla	(Canada) Remi Pelletier-Roy
2015			
2016	(Canada) Aidan Caves	(Guatemala) Julio Padilla Miranda	(United States) Zachary Kovalcik
2017	(Mexico) Ignacio Prado	(Canada) Aidan Caves	(Argentina) Tomas Contte

=== Team Sprint ===
Year	(gold) Gold Medal	(silver) Silver Medal	(bronze) Bronze Medal
2002	Cuba; Yasmani Pol; Michel Pedroso; Reiner Cartaya	Colombia; Wilson Meneses; Jonathan Marín; Víctor Álvarez	Chile; Sebastián Muñoz; José Aravena; Enzo Sesario
2005	Cuba; Julio César Herrera; Reiner Cartaya; Ahmed López	Canada; Cam Mackinnon; Travis Smith; Yannik Morin	United States; Michael Blatchford; Stephen Alfred; Kevin Belz
2006	Cuba; Yasmani Pol; Julio Herrera; Alexis Sotolongo	Argentina; Darío Grosso; Leandro Bottasso; Sergio Guatto	United States; Giddeon Massie; Michael Blatchford; Stephen Alfred
2007	Cuba; Julio César Herrera; Yasmani Poll; Ahmed López	United States; Michael Blatchford; Adam Duvendeck; Kevin Selker	Canada; Cam Mackinnon; Lawrence Leroux; Yannik Morin
2008	Chile; Cristian Concha; Pablo Concha; Christopher Mansilla	Trinidad and Tobago; Ako Kellar; Azikiwe Kellar; Christopher Sellier	Guatemala; Daniel Cute; Gabriel Alberto Castro; José Alberto Gudiel
2009	Colombia; Leonardo Romero; Jonathan Cermeno; Diego Gutiérrez	Canada; Joseph Veloce; Lawrence Leroux; Stéphane Cossette	Chile; Cristian Concha; Pablo Concha; Cristopher Mansilla
2010			
2011			
2012			
2013			
2014			
2015			
2016	Colombia; Rubén Murillo; Fabián Puerta; Santiago Ramírez	Argentina; Leandro Bottasso; Pablo Perruchoud; Juan Pablo Serrano	Canada; Patrice Pivin; Joel Archambault; Stefan Ritter
2017	Colombia; Fabián Puerta; Santiago Ramírez; Rubén Murillo	Trinidad and Tobago; Kwesi Browne; Njisane Phillip; Nicholas Paul	Argentina; Leandro Bottasso; Juan Pablo Serrano; Pablo Perruchoud

=== Team Pursuit ===
Year	(gold) Gold Medal	(silver) Silver Medal	(bronze) Bronze Medal
2002	Chile; Richard Rodríguez; Marco Arriagada; Luis Sepúlveda; Antonio Cabrera	Brazil; Hernandes Quadri; Armando Costa; André Polini; Marcos Novello	Mexico; Ignacio Sarabia; José Sánchez; Luis Macías; Juan de la Rosa
2004	Colombia; José Serpa; Rafael Infantino; Juan Suárez; Andrés Rodríguez	Venezuela; Richard Ochoa; Tomás Gil; Isaac Cañizalez; José Chacón Díaz	Chile; Enzo Cesario; José Aravena; Francisco Cesario; Gonzalo Miranda
2005	Chile; Enzo Cesario; Marco Arriagada; Luis Sepúlveda; Gonzalo Miranda	Argentina; Edgardo Simón; Sebastián Cancio; Fernando Antogna; César Sigura	Colombia; José Serpa; Carlos Alzate; Alexander González; Carlos Quintero
2006	Chile; Enzo Cesario; Antonio Cabrera; Luis Sepúlveda; Gonzalo Miranda	Argentina; Guillermo Bruneta; Jorge Pi; Fernando Antogna; César Sigura	Venezuela; Tomás Gil; Isaac Cañizales; Andrés Hernández; Freddy Segura
2007	Colombia; Juan Pablo Forero; Arles Castro; Carlos Alzate; Jairo Pérez	Venezuela; Tomás Gil; Richard Ochoa; Franklin Chacón; Yosbang Rojas	Dominican Republic; Augusto Sánchez; Jorge Pérez; Euri Vidal; Rafael Merán
2008	Colombia; Edwin Ávila; Weimar Roldán; Jaime Suaza; Carlos Urán	Chile; Raúl Bravo; Antonio Cabrera; Luis Mansilla; Gonzalo Miranda	Argentina; Mauro Agostini; Fernando Antogna; Marcos Crespo; Edgardo Simón
2009	Colombia; Jairo Pérez; Jaime Suaza; John Parra; Juan Pablo Suárez	Chile; Luis Mansilla; Pablo Seisdedos; Antonio Cabrera; José Medina	Cuba; Reidy Pérez; Rubén Companioni; Jan Carlos Pérez; Pedro Sibila
2010			
2011			
2012			
2013			
2014			
2015			
2016	Colombia; Juan Arango; Brayan Sánchez; Eduardo Estrada; Wilmar Paredes	Canada; Ed Veal; Aidan Caves; Jay Lamoureux; Adam Jamieson	Chile; Antonio Cabrera; Edison Bravo; Nicolás González; Diego Ferreyra
2017	Canada; Derek Gee; Aidan Caves; Jay Lamoureux; Bayley Simpson	United States; Eric Young; Logan Owen; Daniel Summerhill; Adrian Hegyvary	Chile; Elias Tello; Luis Fernando Sepúlveda; Cristian Cornejo; Antonio Cabrera

== Women ==
=== Sprint ===
Year	(gold) Gold Medal	(silver) Silver Medal	(bronze) Bronze Medal
2002	(Canada) Lori-Ann Muenzer	(Cuba) Yumari González	(Colombia) Diana García
2004	(United States) Tanya Lindemuth	(Cuba) Yumari González	(Colombia) Diana García
2005	(Colombia) Diana García	(Cuba) Lisandra Guerra	(Venezuela) Angie González
2006	(Colombia) Diana García	(Cuba) Lisandra Guerra	(Venezuela) Angie González
2007	(Cuba) Lisandra Guerra	(United States) Jennie Reed	(Colombia) Diana García
2008			
2009			
2010			
2011			
2012			
2013			
2014	(Cuba) Lisandra Guerra	(Canada) Monique Sullivan	(Venezuela) Daniela Larreal
2015			
2016	(Mexico) Jessica Salazar	(Mexico) Yuli Verdugo	(Mexico) Daniela Gaxiola
2017	(Mexico) Daniela Gaxiola	(Mexico) Yuli Verdugo	(United States) Madalyn Godby

=== 500m time trial ===
Year	(gold) Gold Medal	(silver) Silver Medal	(bronze) Bronze Medal
2002	(Cuba) Yumari González	(Canada) Lori-Ann Muenzer	(Colombia) Diana García
2004	(United States) Tanya Lindenmuth	(Cuba) Yumari González	(Colombia) Diana García
2005	(Cuba) Lisandra Guerra	(Mexico) Nancy Contreras	(Cuba) Yumari González
2006	(Cuba) Lisandra Guerra	(Venezuela) Angie González	(Colombia) Diana García
2007	(Cuba) Lisandra Guerra	(Colombia) Diana García	(Venezuela) Angie González
2008			
2009			
2010			
2011			
2012			(United States) Liz Reap Carlson
2013			
2014			
2015			
2016	(Mexico) Jessica Salazar	(Colombia) Martha Bayona	(Colombia) Juliana Gaviria
2017	(Mexico) Jessica Salazar	(Colombia) Martha Bayona	(United States) Mandy Marquardt

=== Keirin ===
Year	(gold) Gold Medal	(silver) Silver Medal	(bronze) Bronze Medal
2002	(Canada) Lori-Ann Muenzer	(Cuba) Yumari González	(Colombia) Diana García
2004	(Colombia) Diana García	(Cuba) Yumari González	(United States) Tanya Lindenmuth
2005	(Venezuela) Daniela Larreal	(Cuba) Lisandra Guerra	(Colombia) Diana García
2006	(Cuba) Lisandra Guerra	(Venezuela) Angie González	(Colombia) Diana García
2007	(United States) Jennie Reed	(Cuba) Lisandra Guerra	(Mexico) Nancy Contreras
2008			
2009			
2010			
2011			
2012			
2013			
2014			
2015			
2016	(Mexico) Daniela Gaxiola	(Colombia) Juliana Gaviria	(Colombia) Martha Bayona
2017	(Colombia) Martha Bayona	(United States) Mandy Marquardt	(Mexico) Daniela Gaxiola

=== 3km Individual Pursuit ===
Year	(gold) Gold Medal	(silver) Silver Medal	(bronze) Bronze Medal
2002	(Mexico) Belem Guerrero	(Canada) Erin Carter	(Colombia) Sandra Gómez
2004	(Cuba) Yoanka González	(United States) Sarah Uhl	(Venezuela) Dayana Chirinos
2005	(Colombia) María Luisa Calle	(United States) Kristin Armstrong	(United States) Erin Mirabella
2006	(Colombia) María Luisa Calle	(Cuba) Yoanka González	(Cuba) Yudelmis Domínguez
2007	(Colombia) María Luisa Calle	(Venezuela) Danielys García	(Cuba) Dalila Rodriguez
2008			
2009			
2010			
2011			
2012			
2013			
2014			
2015			
2016	(United States) Kelly Catlin	(Cuba) Marlies Mejías	(Canada) Jasmin Duehring
2017	(United States) Kelly Catlin	(Canada) Kinley Gibson	(Cuba) Mailin Sánchez

=== Points Race ===
Year	(gold) Gold Medal	(silver) Silver Medal	(bronze) Bronze Medal
2002	(Mexico) Patricia Palencia	(Mexico) Belem Guerrero	(Ecuador) María Parra
2004	(Colombia) Sandra Gómez	(Dominican Republic) Amelia Blanco	(Venezuela) Dayana Chirinos
2005	(United States) Erin Mirabella	(Cuba) Yudelmis Domínguez	(Cuba) Yumari González
2006	(Cuba) Yoanka González	(Argentina) Cristina Greve	(Colombia) Mónica Méndez
2007	(Mexico) Belem Guerrero	(Colombia) Sandra Gomez	(Cuba) Yoanka González
2008			
2009			
2010			
2011			
2012			
2013			
2014	(Canada) Jasmin Glaesser	(Cuba) Arlenis Sierra	(Colombia) María Luisa Calle
2015			
2016	(Canada) Jasmin Duehring	(Cuba) Arlenis Sierra	(Canada) Ariane Bonhomme
2017	(United States) Jennifer Valente	(Venezuela) Angie González	(Canada) Stephanie Roorda

=== Scratch ===
Year	(gold) Gold Medal	(silver) Silver Medal	(bronze) Bronze Medal
2002	(Mexico) Belem Guerrero	(Mexico) Patricia Palencia	(Chile) Claudia Aravena
2004	(Cuba) Yumari González	(Venezuela) Dayana Chirinos	(Chile) Paola Muñoz
2005	(Cuba) Yumari González	(Canada) Mandy Poitras	(Canada) Gina Grain
2006	(Cuba) Yumari González	(Cuba) Yoanka González	(Venezuela) Karelia Machado
2007	(Colombia) Elizabeth Agudelo	(Mexico) Jessica Jurado	(Brazil) Janildes Fernandes
2008			
2009			
2010			
2011			
2012			
2013			
2014			
2015			
2016	(Mexico) Lizbeth Salazar	(Chile) Paola Muñoz	(Cuba) Arlenis Sierra
2017	(United States) Jennifer Valente	(Cuba) Marlies Mejías	(Canada) Allison Beveridge

=== Omnium ===
Year	(gold) Gold Medal	(silver) Silver Medal	(bronze) Bronze Medal
2011			
2012			
2013			
2014			
2015			
2016	(Cuba) Marlies Mejías	(Mexico) Lizbeth Salazar	(Colombia) Yeny Colmenares
2017	(United States) Jennifer Valente	(Mexico) Lizbeth Salazar	(Venezuela) Angie González

=== Team Sprint ===
Year	(gold) Gold Medal	(silver) Silver Medal	(bronze) Bronze Medal
2007	Venezuela	Cuba	Mexico
2008			
2009			
2010			
2011			
2012		United States; Liz Reap Carlson; Dana Feiss	
2013			
2014			
2015			
2016	Mexico; Jessica Salazar; Yuli Verdugo	Colombia; Juliana Gaviria; Martha Bayona	United States; Mandy Marquardt; Madalyn Godby
2017	United States; Madalyn Godby; Mandy Marquardt	Canada; Stephanie Roorda; Amelia Walsh	Venezuela; Mariaesthela Vilera; Yolimar Pérez

=== Team Pursuit ===
Year	(gold) Gold Medal	(silver) Silver Medal	(bronze) Bronze Medal
2007			
2008			
2009			
2010			
2011			
2012			
2013			
2014			
2015			
2016	Canada; Jasmin Duehring; Ariane Bonhomme; Kinley Gibson; Jamie Gilgen	Mexico; Lizbeth Salazar; Mayra Rocha; Sofía Arreola; Jessica Bonilla	Chile; Javiera Reyes; Constanza Paredes; Carolina Oyarzo; Paola Muñoz
2017	Canada; Devaney Collier; Ariane Bonhomme; Kinley Gibson; Meghan Grant	Mexico; Sofía Arreola; Lizbeth Salazar; Jessica Bonilla; Mayra Rocha	Cuba; Arlenis Sierra; Marlies Mejías; Mailin Sánchez; Yeima Torres

=== Madison ===
Year	(gold) Gold Medal	(silver) Silver Medal	(bronze) Bronze Medal
2017	Canada; Allison Beveridge; Stephanie Roorda	United States; Kimberly Geist; Kimberly Ann Zubris	Mexico; Sofía Arreola; Mayra Rocha
