= List of Panamerican records in track cycling =

Panamerican records in the sport of track cycling are ratified by the Confederación Panamericana de Ciclismo (COPACI).

== Men ==
Event	Record	Athlete	Nationality	Date	Meet	Place	Ref
Flying 200 m time trial	9.100	Nicholas Paul	Trinidad and Tobago	6 September 2019	Pan American Championships	Cochabamba, Bolivia	
250 m time trial (standing start)	17.303	Keron Bramble	Trinidad and Tobago	4 September 2019	Pan American Championships	Cochabamba, Bolivia	
Flying 500 m time trial	26.020	Santiago Ramírez	Colombia	6 October 2016	Pan American Championships	Aguascalientes, Mexico	
1 km time trial	57.508	Kevin Quintero	Colombia	8 September 2019	Pan American Championships	Cochabamba, Bolivia	
1 km time trial (sea level)	1:00.609	Fabián Puerta	Colombia	4 March 2018	World Championships	Apeldoorn, Netherlands	
Team sprint	41.938	Keron Bramble; Njisane Phillip; Nicholas Paul	Trinidad and Tobago	4 September 2019	Pan American Championships	Cochabamba, Bolivia	
4000m individual pursuit	3:59.930	Ashton Lambie	United States	18 August 2021		Aguascalientes, Mexico	
4000m individual pursuit (sea level)	4:02.304	Ashlin Barry	United States	16 October 2026	World Championships	Shanghai, China	
4000m team pursuit	3:46.324	Vincent De Haître; Michael Foley; Derek Gee; Jay Lamoureux	Canada	4 August 2021	Olympic Games	Izu, Japan	
Hour record	53.037 km	Tom Zirbel	United States	16 September 2016		Aguascalientes, Mexico	
Hour record (sea level)	51.304 km	Lionel Sanders	Canada	23 October 2020		Milton, Canada	

== Women ==
Event	Record	Athlete	Nationality	Date	Meet	Place	Ref
Flying 200 m time trial	10.154	Kelsey Mitchell	Canada	5 September 2019	Pan American Championships	Cochabamba, Bolivia	
250 m time trial (standing start)	18.849	Jessica Salazar	Mexico	4 September 2019	Pan American Championships	Cochabamba, Bolivia	
Flying 500 m time trial	29.662	Jennie Reed	United States	16 June 2008		Carson, United States	
500 m time trial	32.268 WR	Jessica Salazar	Mexico	7 October 2016	Pan American Championships	Aguascalientes, Mexico	
Team sprint (500 m)	32.232	Kelsey Mitchell; Lauriane Genest	Canada	4 September 2019	Pan American Championships	Cochabamba, Bolivia	
Team sprint (750 m)	46.198	Daniela Gaxiola; Yuli Verdugo; Jessica Salazar	Mexico	5 August 2024	Olympic Games	Saint-Quentin-en-Yvelines, France	
Team sprint (1000 m)	1:09.302	Mandy Marquardt; McKenna McKee; Allyson Wasielewski	United States	18 July 2021	U.S. Championships	Trexlertown, United States	
Flying 1 km time trial	1:03.264+	Chloé Dygert	United States	29 February 2020	World Championships	Berlin, Germany	
1 km time trial	1:04.940	Stefany Cuadrado	Colombia	21 February 2026	Pan American Championships	Santiago, Chile	
1 km time trial (sea level)	1:04.940	Stefany Cuadrado	Colombia	21 February 2026	Pan American Championships	Santiago, Chile	
3000m individual pursuit	3:15.663 WR	Chloé Dygert	United States	19 October 2024	World Championships	Ballerup, Denmark	
4000m individual pursuit	4:26.127	Chloé Dygert	United States	25 October 2025	World Championships	Santiago, Chile	
4000m individual pursuit (sea level)	4:26.127	Chloé Dygert	United States	25 October 2025	World Championships	Santiago, Chile	
3000m team pursuit*	3:16.853	Sarah Hammer; Dotsie Bausch; Jennie Reed	United States	4 August 2012	Olympic Games	London, Great Britain	
4000m team pursuit	4:04.306	Jennifer Valente; Lily Williams; Chloé Dygert; Kristen Faulkner	United States	7 August 2024	Olympic Games	Saint-Quentin-en-Yvelines, France	
Hour record	47.980 km	Evelyn Stevens	United States	27 February 2016		Colorado Springs, United States	

* In 2013, the 3000m team pursuit, 3 rider format was replaced by the UCI with a 4000m team pursuit, 4 person format.
