= List of Argentine records in track cycling =

The following are the national records in track cycling in Argentina maintained by the Unión Ciclista de la Republica Argentina.

== Men ==
| Event | Record | Athlete | Date | Meet | Place | Ref |
|---|---|---|---|---|---|---|
| Flying 200 m time trial | 9.733 | Leandro Bottasso | 6 September 2019 | Pan American Championships | Cochabamba, Bolivia | |
| 250 m time trial (standing start) | 17.975 | Farid Suárez | 4 September 2019 | Pan American Championships | Cochabamba, Bolivia | |
| 1 km time trial | 59.702 | Farid Suárez | 8 September 2019 | Pan American Championships | Cochabamba, Bolivia | |
| Team sprint | 43.805 | Leandro Bottasso; Pablo Perruchoud; Juan Pablo Serrano | 5 October 2016 | Pan American Championships | Aguascalientes, Mexico | |
| 4000m individual pursuit | 4:15.279 | Eduardo Sepúlveda | 7 February 2013 | Pan American Championships | Mexico City, Mexico | |
| 4000m team pursuit | 4:01.379 | Mauro Agostini; Juan Ignacio Curuchet; Sebastian Trillini; Facundo Olaf Crisafulli | 5 October 2016 | Pan American Championships | Aguascalientes, Mexico | |

== Women ==
| Event | Record | Athlete | Date | Meet | Place | Ref |
|---|---|---|---|---|---|---|
| Flying 200 m time trial | 11.000 | Valentina Méndez | 22 September 2026 | South American Games | Rafaela, Argentina | |
| 250 m time trial (standing start) | 19.633 | Natalia Vera | 17 June 2023 | Pan American Championships | San Juan, Argentina | |
| 500 m time trial | 34.166 | Natalia Vera | 17 June 2023 | Pan American Championships | San Juan, Argentina | |
| 1 km time trial | 1:09.719 | Natalia Vera | 5 April 2025 | Pan American Championships | Asunción, Paraguay | |
| Team sprint (500 m) | 34.129 | Natalia Vera; Mariana Díaz | 30 May 2018 | South American Games | Cochabamba, Bolivia | |
| Team sprint (750 m) | 49.468 | Guadalupe Díaz; Valentina Méndez; Natalia Vera | 20 September 2026 | South American Games | Rafaela, Argentina | |
| 3000m individual pursuit | 3:47.770 | Alejandra Feszczuk | 6 February 2013 | Pan American Championships | Mexico City, Mexico | |
| 3000m team pursuit | 3:44.661 | Cristina Greve; Alejandra Feszczuk; Mariela Delgado | 7 February 2013 | Pan American Championships | Mexico City, Mexico | |
| 4000m team pursuit | 4:30.686 | Julieta Benedetti; Abril Garzón; Ludmila Aguirre; Maribel Aguirre | 20 September 2026 | South American Games | Rafaela, Argentina | |
