= List of Colombian records in track cycling =

The following are the national records in track cycling in Colombia maintained by the Federación Colombiana de Ciclismo.

== Men ==
Event	Record	Athlete	Date	Meet	Place	Ref
Flying 200 m time trial	9.362	Kevin Quintero	6 September 2019	Pan American Championships	Cochabamba, Bolivia	
250 m time trial (standing start)	17.773	Cristian Ortega	14 June 2023	Pan American Championships	San Juan, Argentina	
Flying 500 m time trial	26.020	Santiago Ramírez	6 October 2016	Pan American Championships	Aguascalientes, Mexico	
1 km time trial	57.508	Kevin Quintero	8 September 2019	Pan American Championships	Cochabamba, Bolivia	
1 km time trial (sea level)	59.780	Santiago Ramírez	18 June 2023	Pan American Championships	San Juan, Argentina	
Team sprint	42.772	Rubén Murillo; Fabián Puerta; Santiago Ramírez	5 October 2016	Pan American Championships	Aguascalientes, Mexico	
4000m individual pursuit	4:15.649	Eduardo Estrada	7 October 2016	Pan American Championships	Aguascalientes, Mexico	
4000m team pursuit	3:55.362	Juan Arango; Brayan Sánchez; Eduardo Estrada; Wilmar Paredes	5 October 2016	Pan American Championships	Aguascalientes, Mexico	

== Women ==
Event	Record	Athlete	Date	Meet	Place	Ref
Flying 200 m time trial	10.360	Martha Bayona	5 September 2019	Pan American Championships	Cochabamba, Bolivia	
250 m time trial (standing start)	18.980	Martha Bayona	9 July 2022	Nations Cup	Cali, Colombia	
500 m time trial	32.952	Martha Bayona	9 July 2022	Nations Cup	Cali, Colombia	
1 km time trial	1:04.940	Stefany Cuadrado	21 February 2026	Pan American Championships	Santiago, Chile	
Team sprint (500 m)	32.813	Juliana Gaviria; Martha Bayona	5 October 2016	Pan American Championships	Aguascalientes, Mexico	
Team sprint (750 m)	47.924	Martha Bayona; Valeria Cardozo; Marianis Salazar	14 June 2023	Pan American Championships	San Juan, Argentina	
3000m individual pursuit	3:31.121	María Luisa Calle	18 January 2013	World Cup	Aguascalientes, Mexico	
4000m individual pursuit	4:47.933	Lina Hernández	25 October 2025	World Championships	Santiago, Chile	
3000m team pursuit	3:24.302	María Luisa Calle; Sérika Gulumá; Milena Salcedo	7 February 2013	Pan American Championships	Mexico City, Mexico	
4000m team pursuit	4:23.037	Luciana Osorio; Elizabeth Castaño; Lina Hernández; Camila Valbuena	20 September 2026	South American Games	Rafaela, Argentina	
