= List of Pan American Games records in track cycling =

Pan American Games records in the sport of track cycling are ratified by the Confederación Panamericana de Ciclismo (COPACI).

== Men's records ==
Event	Record	Athlete	Nation	Date	Meet	Place	Ref
Flying 200 m time trial	9.574	Nicholas Paul	Trinidad and Tobago	25 October 2023	2023 Pan American Games	Santiago, Chile	
Team sprint	43.188	Hersony Canelón; César Marcano; Ángel Pulgar	Venezuela	17 October 2011	2011 Pan American Games	Guadalajara, Mexico	
1 km time trial	1:04.423	Ahmed López	Cuba	August 2003	2003 Pan American Games	Santo Domingo, Dominican Republic	
4000 m individual pursuit	4:23.864	Juan Esteban Arango	Colombia	19 October 2011	2011 Pan American Games	Guadalajara, Mexico	
4000 m team pursuit	3:53.593	Carson Mattern; Sean Richardson; Michael Foley; Campbell Parrish	Canada	27 October 2023	2023 Pan American Games	Santiago, Chile	

== Women's records ==
Event	Record	Athlete	Nation	Date	Meet	Place	Ref
Flying 200 m time trial	10.699	Martha Bayona	Colombia	26 October 2023	2023 Pan American Games	Santiago, Chile	
Team sprint (500 m)	33.424	Daniela Gaxiola; Jessica Salazar	Mexico	1 August 2019	2019 Pan American Games	Lima, Peru	
Team sprint (750 m)	47.134	Jessica Salazar; Yuli Verdugo; Daniela Gaxiola	Mexico	24 October 2023	2023 Pan American Games	Santiago, Chile	
500 m time trial	35.394	Tanya Dubnicoff	Canada	28 July 1999	1999 Pan American Games	Winnipeg, Canada	
3000 m individual pursuit	3:31.592	Sarah Hammer	United States	18 July 2015	2015 Pan American Games	Milton, Canada	
4000 m team pursuit	4:19.664	Allison Beveridge; Laura Brown; Jasmin Duehring; Kirsti Lay	Canada	17 July 2015	2015 Pan American Games	Milton, Canada	
