= Visit South Aegean GP =

Cycling road race held in Greece

Race details
- Date: March
- Region: Rhodes, Greece
- Discipline: Road race
- Competition: UCI Europe Tour
- Type: Stage race (2022–2025); One-day race (2026–)

History
- First edition: 2022
- Editions: 5 (as of 2026)
- First winner: Matteo Dal-Cin (CAN)
- Most recent: Bryan Coquard (FRA)

The Visit South Aegean GP is an annual men's professional one day bicycle race held in the Greek island of Rhodes. It is part of UCI Europe Tour as a category 1.1 event. It was first held in 2022. Prior to 2026, the race took place over multiple stages and held 2.2 status under the name Visit South Aegean Islands.

== Winners ==
Year	Country	Rider	Team
2022	Canada	Matteo Dal-Cin	Toronto Hustle
2023	Czech Republic	Jakub Otruba	ATT Investments
2024	Norway	André Drege	Team Coop–Repsol
2025	Denmark	Alexander Arnt Hansen	Airtox–Carl Ras
2026	France	Bryan Coquard	Cofidis

== See also ==
- International Rhodes Grand Prix
- International Tour of Rhodes
