= Edwin Sutherland (cyclist) =

Barbadian cyclist

Cycling career
- Sport: Cycling
- Discipline: Track cycling
Medal record
Men's track cycling
Representing Barbados
Pan American Track Cycling Championships
Bronze medal – third place	2016 Aguascalientes	Scratch

Edwin Sutherland is a Barbadian male track cyclist, representing Barbados at international competitions. He won the bronze medal at the 2016 Pan American Track Cycling Championships in the scratch.
