= Ariane Bonhomme =

Canadian cyclist (born 1995)

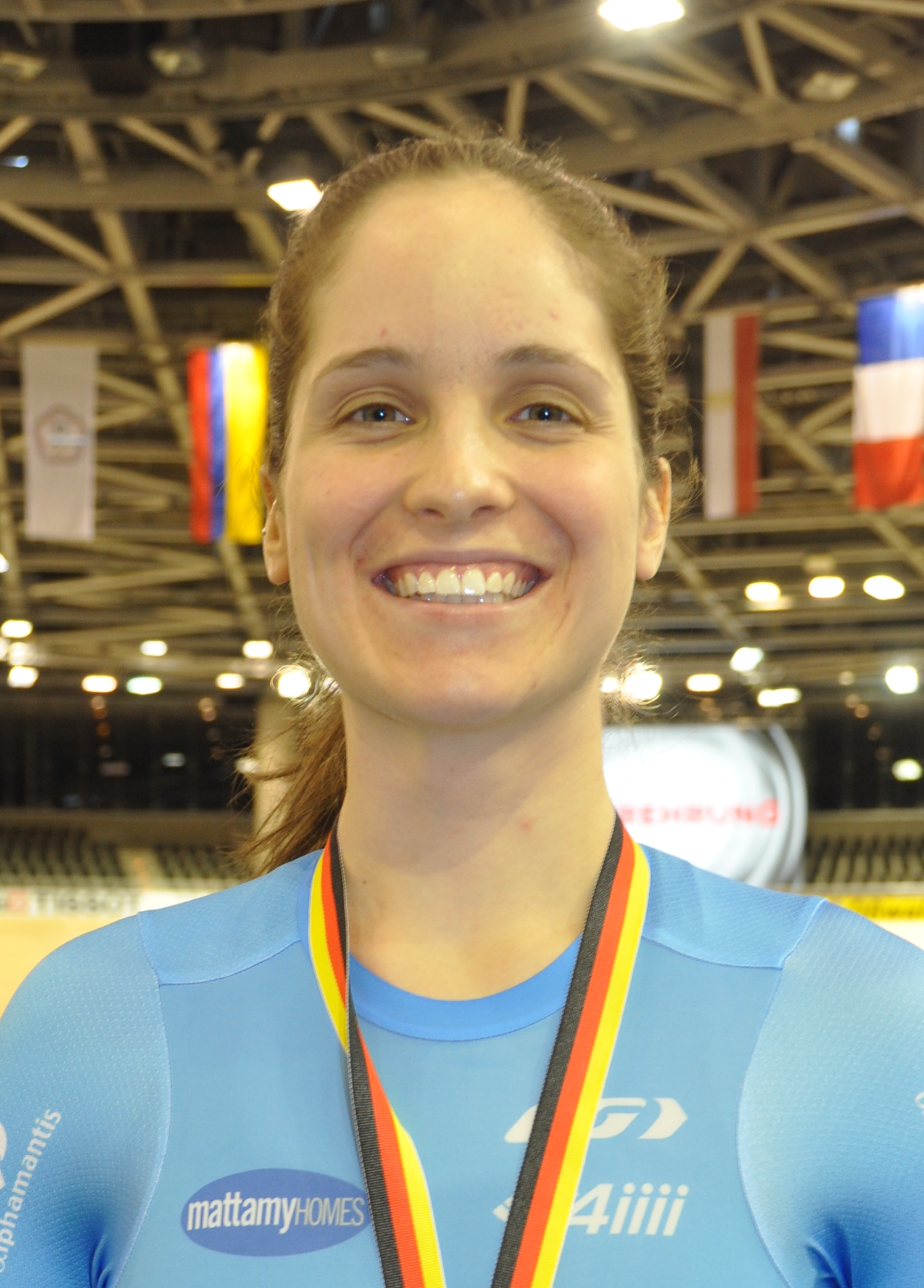
- Ariane Bonhomme (2018)

Personal information
- Born: 2 April 1995 (age 31) Gatineau, Quebec, Canada
- Height: 175 cm (69 in)
- Weight: 70 kg (154 lb)

Cycling career
- Sport: Cycling
- Discipline: Track cycling
Medal record
Women's track cycling
Representing Canada
Commonwealth Games
Bronze medal – third place	2018 Gold Coast	Team pursuit
Pan American Championships
Gold medal – first place	2016 Aguascalientes	Team pursuit
Gold medal – first place	2017 Balmain	Team pursuit
Gold medal – first place	2019 Cochabamba	Team pursuit
Gold medal – first place	2023 San Juan	Team pursuit
Gold medal – first place	2023 San Juan	Individual pursuit
Silver medal – second place	2023 San Juan	Madison
Silver medal – second place	2025 Asunción	Individual pursuit
Silver medal – second place	2025 Asunción	Team pursuit
Bronze medal – third place	2016 Aguascalientes	Points race

Ariane Bonhomme OLY (born 2 April 1995 in Gatineau, Quebec) is a Canadian track cyclist, representing Canada at international competitions. She won the gold medal at the 2016 Pan American Track Cycling Championships in the team pursuit.

== Career ==
Bonhomme qualified to represent Canada at the 2020 Summer Olympics. Bonhomme qualified in 2024 to compete in her Second Olympics.

== Major results ==
=== Road ===
2013
3rd Time trial, National Junior Road Championships
2019
3rd Road race, National Road Championships
4th Grand Prix Cycliste de Gatineau

=== Track ===
2016
Pan American Track Championships

1st Team Pursuit (with Kinley Gibson, Jamie Gilgen and Jasmin Glaesser)
3rd Points Race

2017
2nd Team Pursuit, Round 1, (Pruszków) Track Cycling World Cup (with Allison Beveridge, Annie Foreman-Mackey and Kinley Gibson)
