= Cycling at the 2023 Pan American Games – Women's sprint =

Women's sprint at the 2023 Pan American Games
- Venue: Velódromo Peñalolén
- Dates: 26–27 October
- Competitors: 19 from 11 nations

Medalists
Gold medal	Martha Bayona	Colombia
Silver medal	Yuli Verdugo	Mexico
Bronze medal	Mandy Marquardt	United States

The women's sprint competition of the cycling events at the 2023 Pan American Games was held on 26 and 27 October at the Velódromo Peñalolén in Santiago, Chile.

== Records ==
Prior to this competition, the existing world and Games records were as follows:

World record	Kelsey Mitchell (CAN)	10.154	Cochabamba, Bolivia	5 September 2019
Games record	Kelsey Mitchell (CAN)	10.890	Lima, Peru	3 August 2019

== Schedule ==
All times are local (UTC–3)

Date	Time	Round
26 October 2023	10:05	Qualification
26 October 2023	11:37	1/8 finals
26 October 2023	12:41	Repechage
26 October 2023	18:05	Quarterfinals
27 October 2023	10:05	Semifinals
27 October 2023	10:32	Race for 5–8th places
27 October 2023	18:05	Finals

== Results ==
=== Qualification ===
The top 12 riders advanced to the 1/8 finals.

Rank	Name	Nation	Time	Notes
1	Martha Bayona	Colombia	10.699	Q, GR
2	Sarah Orban	Canada	10.790	Q
3	Yuli Verdugo	Mexico	10.965	Q
4	Kayla Hankins	United States	11.037	Q
5	Mandy Marquardt	United States	11.156	Q
6	Jessica Salazar	Mexico	11.192	Q
7	Marianis Salazar	Colombia	11.248	Q
8	Valeria Cardozo	Colombia	11.262	Q
9	Carolina Barbosa	Brazil	11.272	Q
10	Natalia Vera	Argentina	11.318	Q
11	Daniela Colilef	Chile	11.349	Q
12	Paula Molina	Chile	11.417	Q
13	Emy Savard	Canada	11.454	
14	Valentina Luna	Argentina	11.502	
15	Abigail Recio	Costa Rica	11.506	
16	Tachana Dalger	Suriname	11.565	
17	Dahlia Palmer	Jamaica	11.693	
18	Jalymar Rodríguez	Venezuela	12.006	
19	Talita da Luz	Brazil	12.958	

=== 1/8 finals ===
The winners of each advance to the quarterfinals, while the losers advance to the repechage.

Heat	Rank	Name	Nation	Time	Notes
1	1	Martha Bayona	Colombia	11.275	Q
1	2	Paula Molina	Chile		
2	1	Daniela Colilef	Chile	11.561	Q
2	2	Sarah Orban	Canada		
3	1	Yuli Verdugo	Mexico	11.292	Q
3	2	Natalia Vera	Argentina		
4	1	Kayla Hankins	United States	11.608	Q
4	2	Carolina Barbosa	Brazil		
5	1	Mandy Marquardt	United States	11.661	Q
5	2	Valeria Cardozo	Colombia		
6	1	Jessica Salazar	Mexico	11.751	Q
6	2	Marianis Salazar	Colombia		

=== Repechage ===
The winner of each advanced to the quarterfinals.

Heat	Rank	Name	Nation	Time	Notes
1	1	Carolina Barbosa	Brazil	11.677	Q
1	2	Valeria Cardozo	Colombia		
1	3	Paula Molina	Chile		
2	1	Sarah Orban	Canada	11.489	Q
2	2	Marianis Salazar	Colombia		
2	3	Natalia Vera	Argentina		

=== Quarterfinals ===
The winner of each advanced to the semifinals.

Heat	Rank	Name	Nation	Race 1	Race 2	Decide	Notes
1	1	Martha Bayona	Colombia	11.254	11.165		Q
1	2	Sarah Orban	Canada				
2	1	Carolina Barbosa	Brazil	11.656	11.650		Q
2	2	Daniela Colilef	Chile				
3	1	Yuli Verdugo	Mexico	11.483	11.357		Q
3	2	Jessica Salazar	Mexico				
4	1	Mandy Marquardt	United States	11.552	11.571		Q
4	2	Kayla Hankins	United States				

=== Race for 5–8th places ===
Rank	Name	Nation	Time	Notes
5	Jessica Salazar	Mexico	11.646	
6	Sarah Orban	Canada		
7	Kayla Hankins	United States		
8	Daniela Colilef	Chile		

=== Semifinals ===
The winner of each advanced to the final.

Heat	Rank	Name	Nation	Race 1	Race 2	Decide	Notes
1	1	Martha Bayona	Colombia	11.322	11.345		Q
1	2	Mandy Marquardt	United States				
2	1	Yuli Verdugo	Mexico	11.460	11.351		Q
2	2	Carolina Barbosa	Brazil				

=== Finals ===
The final classification is determined in the medal finals.

Rank	Name	Nation	Race 1	Race 2	Decide	Notes
Gold medal final
1st place, gold medalist(s)	Martha Bayona	Colombia	11.088	11.154		
2nd place, silver medalist(s)	Yuli Verdugo	Mexico	REL			
Bronze medal final
3rd place, bronze medalist(s)	Mandy Marquardt	United States	11.746	12.155		
4	Carolina Barbosa	Brazil				
