= 2017 Pan American Track Cycling Championships =

Cycling Championship

- Venue: Couva, Trinidad & Tobago
- Date(s): 30 August – 3 September
- Velodrome: National Cycling Centre
- Nations participating: 20
- Cyclists participating: 168
- Events: 20

The 2017 Pan American Track Cycling Championships took place at the National Cycling Centre, in Couva, Trinidad & Tobago, from 30 August to 3 September 2017. The event served as a qualifier for the 2018 Central American and Caribbean Games and the United States won the event.

== Medal summary ==
=== Men ===
Event	Gold	Silver	Bronze
Sprint	Hugo Barrette; Canada	Fabián Puerta; Colombia	Jair Tjon En Fa; Suriname
1 km time trial	Fabián Puerta; Colombia	Santiago Ramírez; Colombia	Quincy Alexander; Trinidad and Tobago
Keirin	Fabián Puerta; Colombia	Hugo Barrette; Canada	Leandro Bottasso; Argentina
Scratch	Hugo Velázquez; Argentina	Bryan Gómez; Colombia	Clever Martínez; Venezuela
Points race	Eric Young; United States	Antonio Cabrera; Chile	Edwin Ávila; Colombia
Individual pursuit	Derek Gee; Canada	Jay Lamoureux; Canada	Ignacio Delgado; Mexico
Omnium	Ignacio Prado; Mexico	Aidan Caves; Canada	Tomás Contte; Argentina
Madison	United States; Zachary Carlson; Zachary Kovalcik	Argentina; Tomás Contte; Sebastián Trillini	Colombia; Jordan Parra; Edwin Ávila
Team sprint	Colombia; Fabián Puerta; Santiago Ramírez; Rubén Murillo	Trinidad and Tobago; Kwesi Browne; Njisane Phillip; Nicholas Paul	Argentina; Leandro Bottasso; Juan Pablo Serrano; Pablo Perruchoud
Team pursuit	Canada; Aidan Caves; Jay Lamoureux; Derek Gee; Bayley Simpson	United States; Eric Young; Logan Owen; Daniel Summerhill; Adrian Hegyvary	Chile; Elías Tello; Luis Fernando Sepúlveda; Cristian Cornejo; Antonio Cabrera

=== Women ===
Event	Gold	Silver	Bronze
Sprint	Luz Gaxiola; Mexico	Yuli Verdugo; Mexico	Madalyn Godby; United States
500 m time trial	Jessica Salazar; Mexico	Martha Bayona; Colombia	Mandy Marquardt; United States
Keirin	Martha Bayona; Colombia	Mandy Marquardt; United States	Luz Gaxiola; Mexico
Individual pursuit	Kelly Catlin; United States	Kinley Gibson; Canada	Mailyn Sánchez; Cuba
Points race	Jennifer Valente; United States	Angie González; Venezuela	Stephanie Roorda; Canada
Scratch	Jennifer Valente; United States	Marlies Mejías; Cuba	Allison Beveridge; Canada
Omnium	Jennifer Valente; United States	Yarely Salazar; Mexico	Angie González; Venezuela
Madison	Canada; Allison Beveridge; Stephanie Roorda	United States; Kimberly Geist; Kimberly Zubris	Mexico; Sofía Arreola; Mayra Rocha
Team sprint	United States; Madalyn Godby; Mandy Marquardt	Canada; Stephanie Roorda; Amelia Walsh	Venezuela; Mariaesthela Vilera; Yolimar Pérez
Team pursuit	Canada; Ariane Bonhomme; Kinley Gibson; Devaney Collier; Meghan Grant	Mexico; Sofía Arreola; Yarely Salazar; Jessica Bonilla; Mayra Rocha	Cuba; Arlenis Sierra; Marlies Mejías; Mailyn Sánchez; Yeima Torres; Claudia Baró

== Medal table ==
* Host nation (Trinidad and Tobago)

Rank	Nation	Gold	Silver	Bronze	Total
1	United States	7	3	2	12
2	Canada	5	5	2	12
3	Colombia	4	4	2	10
4	Mexico	3	3	3	9
5	Argentina	1	1	3	5
6	Venezuela	0	1	3	4
7	Cuba	0	1	2	3
8	Chile	0	1	1	2
8	Trinidad and Tobago*	0	1	1	2
10	Suriname	0	0	1	1
Totals (10 entries)		20	20	20	60
