= Cycling at the 2023 Pan American Games – Women's team sprint =

Women's team sprint at the 2023 Pan American Games
- Venue: Velodrome
- Dates: 24 October
- Competitors: 22 from 7 nations
- Winning time: 47.134

Medalists
Gold medal	Jessica Salazar; Yuli Verdugo; Daniela Gaxiola	Mexico
Silver medal	Keely Ainslie; Kayla Hankins; Mandy Marquardt	United States
Bronze medal	Emy Savard; Sarah Orban; Jacklynn Boyle	Canada

The women's team sprint competition of the cycling events at the 2023 Pan American Games was held on 24 October at the Velodrome in Santiago, Chile.

== Records ==
Prior to this competition, the existing world and Games records were as follows:

World record	Germany	45.848	Glasgow, United Kingdom	3 August 2023
Games record	Not established			

== Schedule ==
Date	Time	Round
24 October 2023	11:30	Qualification
24 October 2023	19:07	Final

== Results ==
=== Qualification ===
Rank	Nation	Time	Behind	Notes
1	Mexico; Jessica Salazar; Yuli Verdugo; Daniela Gaxiola	47.960		QG, GR
2	United States; Keely Ainslie; Kayla Hankins; Mandy Marquardt	48.650	+0.690	QG
3	Canada; Emy Savard; Sarah Orban; Jacklynn Boyle	49.110	+1.150	QB
4	Colombia; Yarli Mosquera; Valeria Cardozo; Martha Bayona	49.670	+1.710	QB
5	Argentina; Milagros Sanabria; Valentina Luna; Natalia Vera	50.889	+2.929	
6	Chile; Paola Muñoz; Paula Molina; Daniela Colilef	51.000	+3.040	
7	Brazil; Ana Paula Polegatch; Wellyda Rodrigues; Alice Melo	1:01.570	+13.610	

=== Finals ===
Rank	Nation	Time	Behind	Notes
Gold medal final
1st place, gold medalist(s)	Mexico; Jessica Salazar; Yuli Verdugo; Daniela Gaxiola	47.134		GR
2nd place, silver medalist(s)	United States; Keely Ainslie; Kayla Hankins; Mandy Marquardt	48.001	+0.867	
Bronze medal final
3rd place, bronze medalist(s)	Canada; Emy Savard; Sarah Orban; Jacklynn Boyle	48.498		
4	Colombia; Yarli Mosquera; Juliana Gaviria; Martha Bayona	48.836	+0.338	
