= Kinley Gibson =

Canadian cyclist (born 1995)

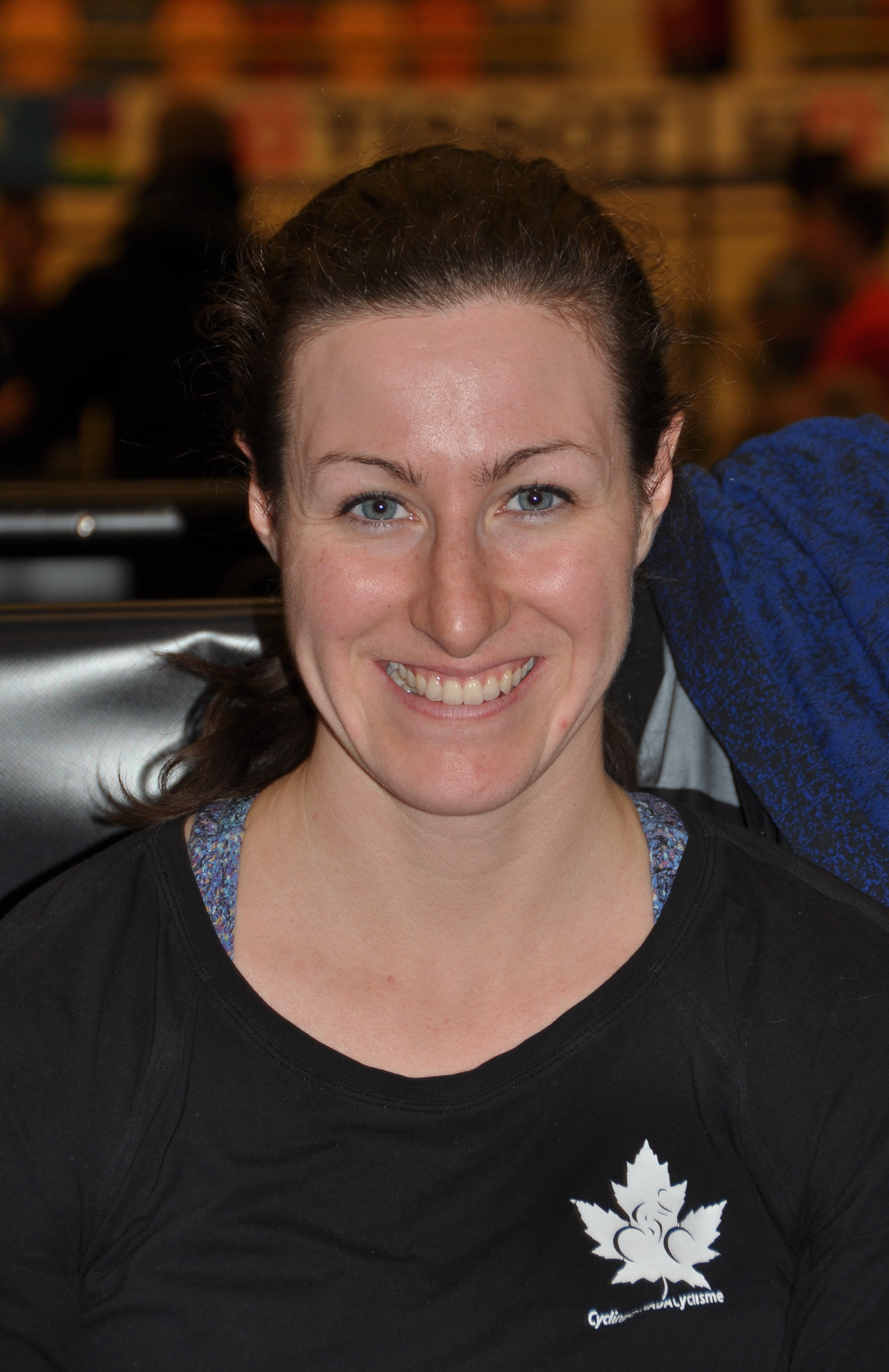
- Kinley Gibson (2018)

Personal information
- Born: 16 January 1995 (age 31)

Cycling career
- Sport: Cycling
- Discipline: Track cycling
Medal record
Women's track cycling
Representing Canada
Pan American Championships
Gold medal – first place	2016 Aguascalientes	Team pursuit
Gold medal – first place	2017 Couva	Team pursuit
Silver medal – second place	2017 Couva	Individual pursuit
Bronze medal – third place	2019 Cochabamba	Scratch

Kinley Gibson (born January 16, 1995) is a Canadian track and road bicycle racer currently living in Edmonton, AB. She competed at the 2013 UCI Juniors Track World Championships in the Women's scratch race, finishing 2nd. At the 2013 UCI Road World Championships she finished 9th in the junior time trial.

== Palmares ==
2013
1st National Junior Time Trial championship
3rd National Junior Road race championships
1st National Junior Criterium championship
2nd National Junior Track championships - Points race
1st National Junior Track championship - Individual pursuit
1st National Junior Track championship - Omnium
2nd National Junior Track championships - Individual Time Trial
2nd UCI World Junior Track championships - Scratch race

2016
1st Team Pursuit Pan American Track Championships (with Ariane Bonhomme, Jamie Gilgen and Jasmin Glaesser)
2nd Points Race, Milton International Challenge

2017
2nd Team Pursuit, Round 1, (Pruszków) Track Cycling World Cup (with Ariane Bonhomme, Allison Beveridge and Annie Foreman-Mackey)
