= Nicolás González (cyclist) =

Chilean male track cyclist

Personal information
- Full name: Nicolás González Gutíerrez
- Born: 20 September 1997 (age 29)

Cycling career
- Sport: Cycling
- Discipline: Track cycling
Medal record
Men's track cycling
Representing Chile
Pan American Track Cycling Championships
Bronze medal – third place	2016 Aguascalientes	Team pursuit

Nicolás González Gutíerrez (born 20 September 1997) is a Chilean male track cyclist, representing Chile at international competitions. He won the bronze medal at the 2016 Pan American Track Cycling Championships in the team pursuit.
