= Hugo Velázquez =

Argentine cyclist

Personal information
- Full name: Hugo Ángel Velázquez
- Born: 16 July 1992 (age 34) San Nicolás de los Arroyos, Argentina

Cycling career
- Sport: Cycling
- Discipline: Road
- Role: Rider

Amateur team
- 2015–2016: Transporte El Sol–9 de Julio

Professional teams
- 2017: Tusnad Cycling Team
- 2018: UnitedHealthcare
Medal record
Men's track cycling
Representing Argentina
Pan American Championships
Gold medal – first place	2017 Couva	Scratch

Hugo Ángel Velázquez (born 16 July 1992 in San Nicolás de los Arroyos) is an Argentine cyclist, who last rode for UCI Professional Continental team UnitedHealthcare.

== Major results ==
2014
1st Time trial, National Under-23 Road Championships
2016
3rd Time trial, National Road Championships
2017
1st Stage 1 Tour de Serbie
