= Jamie Gilgen =

Canadian cyclist

Personal information
- Born: 22 October 1981 (age 44)
- Height: 183 cm (6 ft 0 in)

Cycling career
- Sport: Cycling
- Disciplines: Road; Track
- Role: Rider
- Rider type: Sprinter (road); Endurance (track)

Amateur teams
- 2013: Infinit Nutrition/CyclePower
- 2015: The Cyclery–Opus
- 2017–2018: Rise Racing

Professional team
- 2016: Visit Dallas DNA Pro Cycling
Medal record
Women's track cycling
Representing Canada
Pan American Track Cycling Championships
Gold medal – first place	2016 Aguascalientes	Team pursuit

Jamie Gilgen (born 22 October 1981) is a Canadian road and track cyclist, representing Canada at international competitions. She won the gold medal at the 2016 Pan American Track Cycling Championships in the team pursuit. She won the bronze medal at the 2015 Canadian National Road Race Championships.

== Major results ==
2014
3rd Criterium, National Road Championships
2015
3rd Road race, National Road Championships
8th Overall Tulsa Tough
2016
1st Team pursuit, Pan American Track Championships (with Ariane Bonhomme, Kinley Gibson and Jasmin Glaesser)
Milton International Challenge

2nd Scratch
2nd Individual pursuit
3rd Points race

3rd Tour of Somerville
8th Grand Prix Cycliste de Gatineau
2017
1st Sprints classification Tour of the Gila
