= Diego Peña =

Colombian cyclist

Cycling career
- Sport: Cycling
- Discipline: Track cycling
Medal record
Representing Colombia
Men's track cycling
Pan American Championships
Silver medal – second place	2016 Aguascalientes	1 km time trial

Diego Peña is a Colombian male track cyclist, representing Colombia at international competitions. He won the silver medal at the 2016 Pan American Track Cycling Championships in the 1 km time trial.
