= Michael Foley (cyclist) =

Canadian cyclist (born 1999)

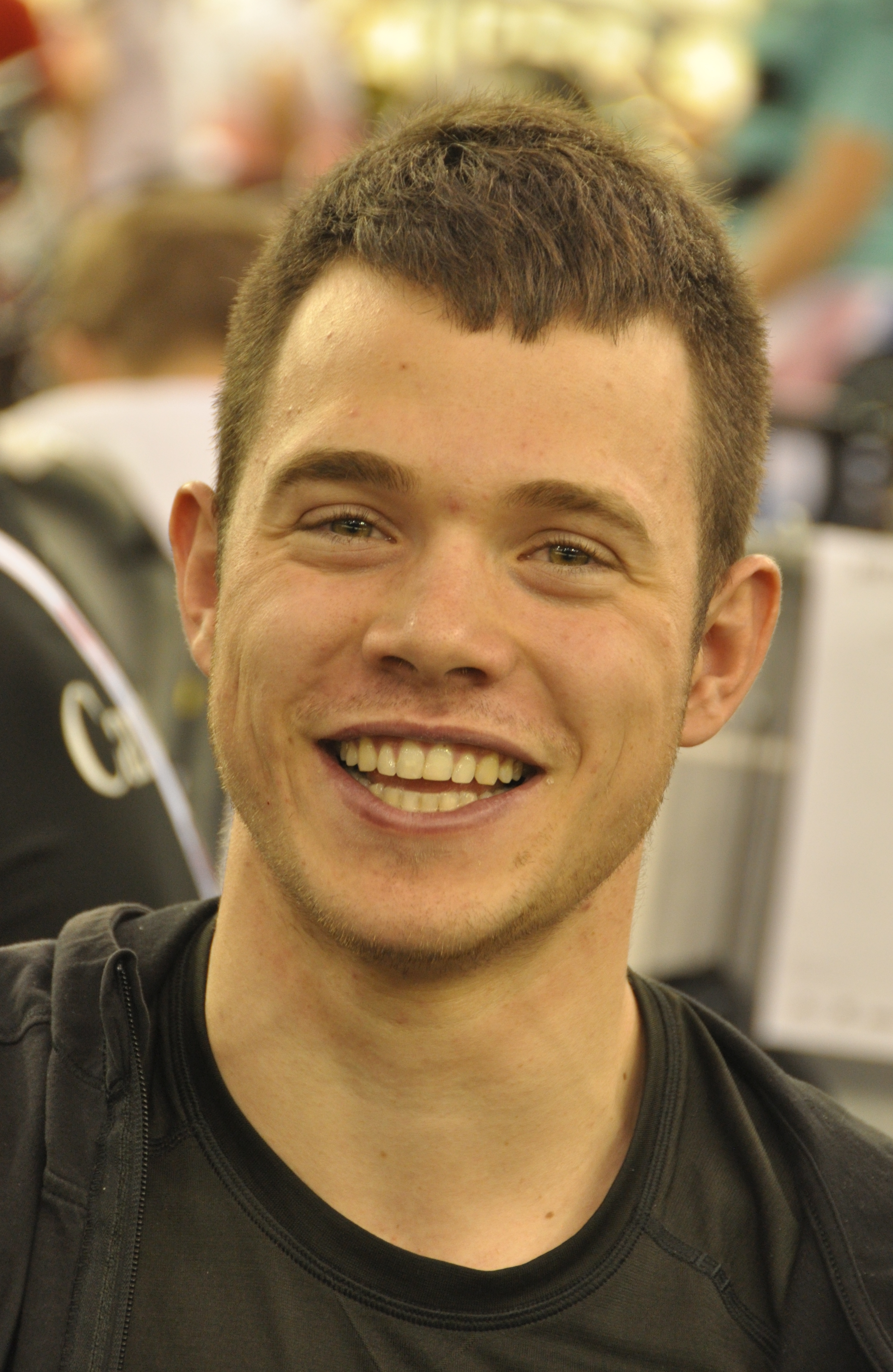
- Foley in 2018

Personal information
- Born: January 12, 1999 (age 27) Milton, Ontario, Canada
- Height: 179 cm (5 ft 10 in)
- Weight: 72 kg (159 lb)

Cycling career
- Sport: Cycling
- Current team: Hustle Pro Cycling
- Disciplines: Track; Road
- Role: Rider

Amateur teams
- 2018: Team RaceClean
- 2019: Toronto Velodrome Club

Professional teams
- 2021: XSpeed United Continental
- 2022–: Toronto Hustle
Medal record
Men's track cycling
Representing Canada
Commonwealth Games
Bronze medal – third place	2018 Gold Coast	Team pursuit
Pan American Games
Gold medal – first place	2023 Santiago	Team pursuit
Pan American Championships
Gold medal – first place	2019 Cochabamba	Team pursuit
Gold medal – first place	2019 Cochabamba	Points race
Gold medal – first place	2022 Lima	Madison
Gold medal – first place	2022 Lima	Team pursuit
Gold medal – first place	2023 San Juan	Team pursuit
Silver medal – second place	2022 Lima	Points race
Silver medal – second place	2023 San Juan	Individual pursuit

Michael Foley (born January 12, 1999) is a Canadian racing cyclist, who currently rides for UCI Continental team Hustle Pro Cycling. He rode in the men's team pursuit event at the 2018 UCI Track Cycling World Championships. He qualified to represent Canada at the 2020 Summer Olympics.

== Major results ==
=== Track ===
2017
2nd Team pursuit, National Championships
2nd Team pursuit, Milton, 2017–18 UCI World Cup
2018
National Championships

1st Team pursuit (with Derek Gee, Evan Burtnik & Adam Jamieson)
1st Madison (with Derek Gee)

3rd Team pursuit, Commonwealth Games
3rd Team pursuit, Berlin, 2018–19 UCI World Cup
2019
Pan American Championships

1st Points race
1st Team pursuit (with Vincent De Haître, Jay Lamoureux & Derek Gee)

National Championships

1st Team pursuit (with Aidan Caves, Jay Lamoureux & Chris Ernst)
1st Madison (with Derek Gee)

2021
2nd Team pursuit, Cali, UCI Nations Cup
2022
Pan American Championships

1st Madison (with Dylan Bibic)
1st Team pursuit (with Evan Burtnik, Chris Ernst & Sean Richardson)
2nd Points race

National Championships

1st Individual pursuit
2nd Team pursuit
2nd Team sprint

2023
Pan American Championships

1st Team pursuit (with Dylan Bibic, Mathias Guillemette & Sean Richardson)
2nd Individual pursuit

1st Individual pursuit, National Championships

=== Road ===
2017
3rd Road race, National Junior Championships
2022
1st Criterium, National Championships
