= Sebastián Trillini =

Argentine cyclist

Personal information
- Full name: Sebastián Martin Junior Trillini
- Born: 16 April 1994 (age 32)

Cycling career
- Sport: Cycling
- Disciplines: Track; Road
- Role: Rider
- Rider type: Pursuitist (track)

Amateur teams
- 2014: Hagens Berman U23
- 2016: Italomat–Dogo–Orbai
- 2018: SAT
- 2022: Super Froiz
- 2022: Lafranfox
- 2024: Náutico Boca del Cufré

Professional teams
- 2015: Unieuro–Wilier
- 2017: Italomat–Dogo
- 2023: Chimbas Te Quiero
Medal record
Representing Argentina
Men's road bicycle racing
Pan American Championships
Silver medal – second place	2015 León	Under-23 time trial
Men's track cycling
Pan American Championships
Silver medal – second place	2017 Couva	Madison
Bronze medal – third place	2016 Aguascalientes	Madison

Sebastián Martin Junior Trillini (born 16 April 1994) is an Argentine road and track cyclist, who last rode for UCI Continental team Chimbas Te Quiero. He competed in the team pursuit event at the 2015 UCI Track Cycling World Championships. He won the silver medal in the under-23 time trial at the 2015 Pan American Road Cycling Championships.

== Major results ==
2014
1st Stage 4 Tour of Walla Walla
2015
2nd Time trial, Pan American Under-23 Road Championships
2016
3rd Madison, Pan American Track Championships (with Rubén Ramos)
4th Time trial, Pan American Under-23 Road Championships
2017
2nd Madison, Pan American Track Championships (with Tomás Contte)
6th Time trial, Pan American Road Championships
2018
2nd Overall Doble Bragado

1st Stage 1

8th Overall Vuelta del Uruguay
