= Toronto Hustle =

Canadian cycling team

Team information
- UCI code: TOR
- Registered: Canada
- Founded: 2017
- Status: Club (2017–2021); UCI Continental (2022–)

Key personnel
- General manager: Brad Bradford
- Team manager: Hudson Lubbers

Team name history
- 2017–: Toronto Hustle

Toronto Hustle is a Canadian UCI Continental road cycling team based in Toronto, Ontario, Canada. Formed in 2017, the team registered with the UCI for the 2022 season as a UCI Continental team and has competed at the professional level since. The team is mainly focused on road events, but also has riders who compete across multiple disciplines including track and gravel events.

== Team roster ==
As of 2026.

Rider	Date of birth
Max Bradwin (CAN)	13 May 2005 (age 21)
Lynden Doyon (CAN)	19 October 2007 (age 18)
Michael Foley (CAN)	12 January 1999 (age 27)
Jack Harris (CAN)	30 November 2006 (age 19)
Patrick Harris (CAN)	26 March 2005 (age 21)
Zakariya Jackson (CAN)	2 December 2001 (age 24)
Hudson Lubbers (CAN)	19 December 2005 (age 20)
Brody Mann (CAN)	24 November 2007 (age 18)
Anton Varabei (CAN)	2 September 1985 (age 41)
Yehor Volkov (UKR)	1 January 2004 (age 22)

== Major wins ==
=== 2022 ===
Overall South Aegean Tour, Matteo Dal-Cin
South Aegean Tour Stage 2, Matteo Dal-Cin

=== 2023 ===
Stage 3 Tour de Beauce, Carson Miles

=== 2026 ===
Canadian Track Championships Men's Elite Points Race, Brody Mann
