= Matteo Dal-Cin =

Canadian road cyclist

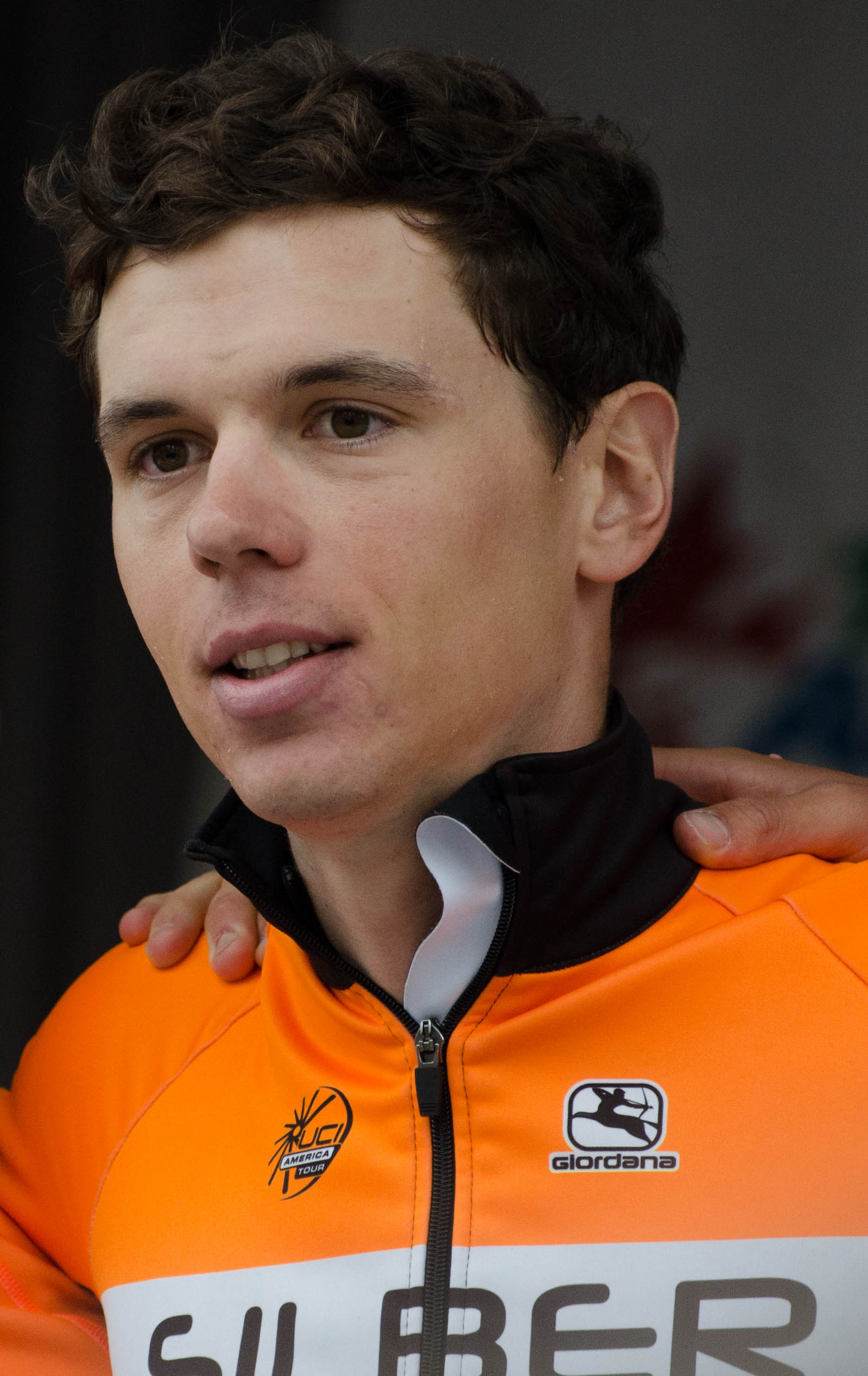
- Dal-Cin at the 2016 Tour of Alberta

Personal information
- Full name: Matteo Dal-Cin
- Born: 14 January 1991 (age 35) Ottawa, Ontario, Canada
- Height: 1.94 m (6 ft 4 in)
- Weight: 77 kg (170 lb)

Cycling career
- Sport: Cycling
- Current team: Hustle Pro Cycling
- Discipline: Road
- Role: Rider

Amateur team
- 2013–2014: Stevens Racing–The Cyclery

Professional teams
- 2014–2016: Silber Pro Cycling Team
- 2017–2021: Rally Cycling
- 2022–: Toronto Hustle

Matteo Dal-Cin (born 14 January 1991) is a Canadian cyclist, who currently rides for UCI Continental team Hustle Pro Cycling.

== Major results ==
2009
2nd Time trial, National Junior Road Championships
2011
3rd Time trial, National Under-23 Road Championships
2013
Canada Summer Games

1st Individual time trial
2nd Road race

3rd Time trial, National Under-23 Road Championships
2014
1st Stage 2 Tucson Bicycle Classic
1st Stage 3 Tour de White Rock
8th White Spot / Delta Road Race
2015
1st Overall Grand Prix Cycliste de Saguenay

1st Stage 1

2nd Criterium, National Road Championships
2nd Overall Tucson Bicycle Classic

1st Stage 2

2016
1st Overall Redlands Bicycle Classic
6th Overall Grand Prix Cycliste de Saguenay
2017
National Road Championships

1st Road race
6th Time trial

1st Stage 2 Tour de Beauce
9th Overall Tour of the Gila

1st Stage 1

2020
7th UCI Esports World Championships
2022
1st Overall South Aegean Tour

1st Stage 2

2nd Time trial, National Road Championships
2nd Overall Tour of the Gila
10th International Rhodes Grand Prix
2023
3rd Time trial, National Road Championships
4th Overall Tour de Beauce
