= Mandy Marquardt =

American track cyclist

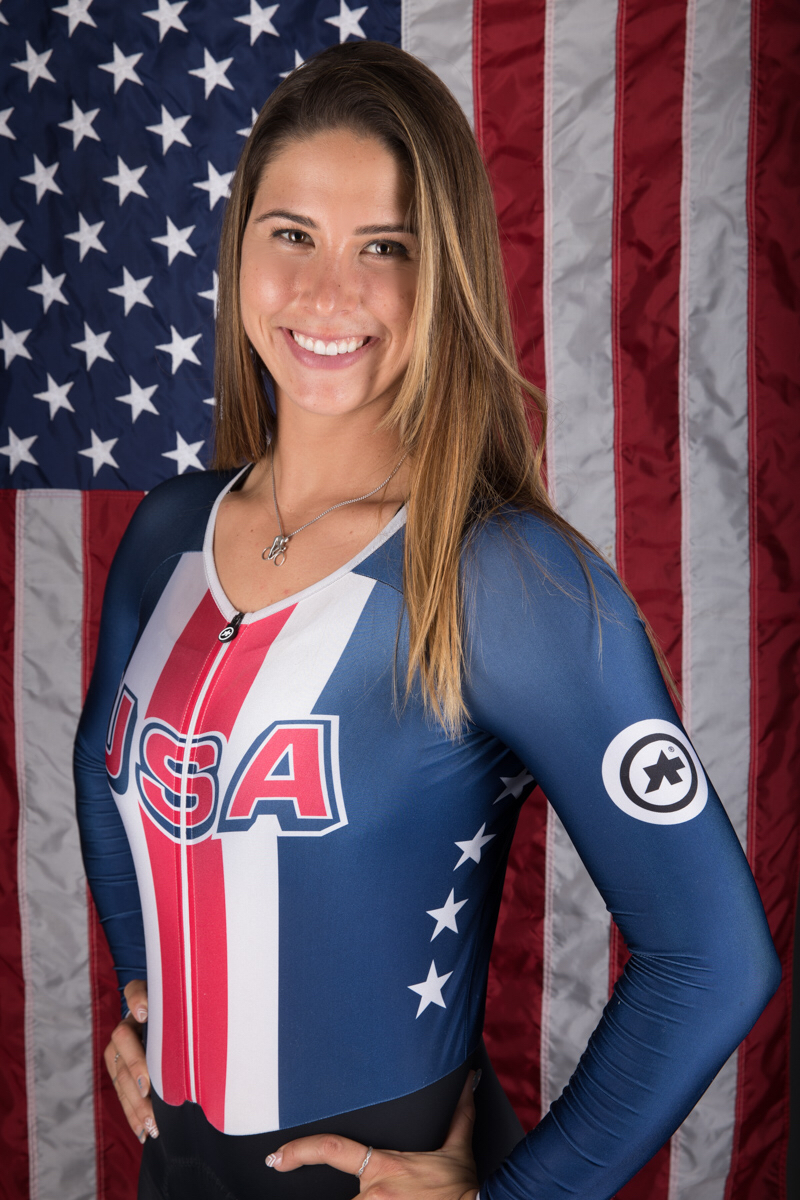
- Marquardt in 2019

Personal information
- Born: August 7, 1991 (age 35) Mannheim, Germany
- Height: 175 cm (69 in)

Cycling career
- Sport: Cycling
- Current team: Team Novo Nordisk
- Discipline: Track cycling
- Rider type: Sprinter

Major wins
- 27 U.S National Titles, 5-time American Record Holder, 2-Pan American Games Medalist, 2019 Tissot UCI Track Cycling World Cup Minsk, Belarus - Sprint 4th place
Medal record
Women's track cycling
Representing United States
Pan American Games
Silver medal – second place	2023 Santiago	Team sprint
Bronze medal – third place	2023 Santiago	Sprint
Pan American Championships
Gold medal – first place	2017 Couva	Team sprint
Silver medal – second place	2017 Couva	Kierin
Silver medal – second place	2018 Aguascalientes	Team sprint
Bronze medal – third place	2017 Couva	500 m time trial
Bronze medal – third place	2016 Aguascalientes	Team sprint
Bronze medal – third place	2019 Cochabamba	Sprint
Bronze medal – third place	2023 San Juan	Team sprint
Bronze medal – third place	2024 Carson	Team sprint

Mandy Marquardt (born August 7, 1991) is an American female sprint track cyclist, representing the United States. Marquardt was diagnosed with type 1 diabetes at the age of 16. Marquardt is an 27-time U.S. National Champion, 4-time U.S. National Record Holder in the Standing 500m Time Trial, Standing 1 km Time Trial, Team Sprint (2-rider) and Team Sprint (3-rider) .

She defended her title in the Time Trial and won the gold in the Keirin at the 2023 United States National Track Championships held at VELO Sports Center. Marquardt has won the gold in the 500m Time Trial for the last seven years, starting in 2016. (The 2020 U.S. Track Nationals were canceled due to the pandemic.)

Marquardt was named to the 2023 USA National Team. She represented the United States at the Track Pan American Continental Championships in San Juan, Argentina, where she won the silver in the Time Trial and bronze in the Team Sprint.

Marquardt was named to the 2023 USA Track Team that competed at the 2023 UCI Cycling World Championships in Glasgow, Scotland.

Marquardt was named to the 2020 Olympic Long Team for track cycling by USA Cycling.

== Early life ==
Born in Mannheim, Germany, in August 1991, Mandy Marquardt moved with her mother and father to Plantation, Florida, when she was six years old. After playing tennis, swimming and showing an interest in triathlons, she began cycling on the track at the age of 10 at the Velodrome at the Brian Piccolo Park. A year later, she won her first two gold medals at the 2003 U.S. Junior Women's 10-12 Road National Championships in Texas.

Marquardt continued to race both the road and track discipline for years. At the age of 15, she moved to Germany to live with her father and to race on the European circuit. One year later, she won a bronze medal in the 500m time trial at the German Junior National Championships.

At the end of year testing in Germany, Marquardt was diagnosed with type 1 diabetes at the age of 16. A doctor told her that she would never be able to compete at a high level at her sport again. After working with and learning from experts to manage her diabetes, she once again won the bronze medal in the 500m Time Trial at the German Junior National Championships.

After moving back to Florida, Marquardt joined Team Novo Nordisk in 2010. That same year, she enrolled at Penn State Lehigh Valley, where she eventually became a Campus Cycling Club coach and graduated with a degree in Business Management and Marketing.

== Major results ==
;2014

2nd Sprint, Champions of Sprint
3rd Keirin, Keirin Revenge
3rd Team Sprint, Grand Prix of Colorado Spring
2015
1st Keirin, Keirin Revenge
2nd Sprint, Champions of Sprint
2016
Puerto Rico Track Cup

1st Sprint
1st Keirin
1st 500m Time Trial
3rd Scratch Race

Easter International Grand Prix

1st Sprint
2nd Keirin

2nd Keirin, Fastest Man on Wheels
2nd Sprint, US Sprint GP
3rd Team Sprint, 2016 Pan American Track Cycling Championships (with Madalyn Godby)
Festival of Speed

3rd Keirin
3rd Sprint

2017
1st Sprint, Easter International Grand Prix
1st Sprint, US Sprint GP
1st Team Sprint, Fastest Man on Wheels (with Madalyn Godby)
1st Sprint, Keirin Cup / Madison Cup
2018
1st 500m Time Trial, United States National Track Championships
1st Sprint, U.S. Sprint Gran Prix
2019
1st Sprint, United States National Track Championships
1st Keirin, United States National Track Championships
1st 500m Time Trial, United States National Track Championships
1st Sprint, UCI C1 Fastest Woman on Wheels
3rd Sprint, 2019 Pan American Track Cycling Championships
4th Sprint, 2019–20 UCI Track Cycling World Cup, Round 1 in Minsk, Belarus
2021
1st Sprint, United States National Track Championships
1st Keirin, United States National Track Championships
1st 500m Time Trial, United States National Track Championships
1st Team Sprint, United States National Track Championships with McKenna McKee and Allyson Wasielewski
1st Sprint, UCI Fastest Man and Woman On Wheels, CL1
1st Keirin, UCI Fastest Man and Woman On Wheels, CL1
1st Sprint, UCI Festival of Speed, CL1
1st Keirin, UCI Festival of Speed, CL1
1st Sprint, UCI Tandemonium, CL1
1st Keirin, UCI Tandemonium, CL1
2022
1st Sprint, United States National Track Championships
1st 500m Time Trial, United States National Track Championships
1st Team Sprint, United States National Track Championships with Annika Flannigan and Divya Verma
2nd Keirin, United States National Track Championships
2nd Sprint, UCI CL1 - T-Town Summer Games - US GP
2nd Sprint, UCI CL1 - T-Town Summer Games - Discover Lehigh Valley GP
2nd Sprint, UCI CL2 - T-Town Summer Games - Festival Of Speed
3rd Keirin, UCI CL2 T-Town Summer Games - Festival Of Speed
4th Keirin, UCI CL1 - T-Town Summer Games - US GP
4th Keirin, UCI CL1 - T-Town Summer Games - Discover Lehigh Valley GP
4th Team Sprint, Pan American Track Cycling Championships new national record with Kayla Hankins, Keely Kortman, and McKenna McKee
4th Time Trial, Pan American Track Cycling Championships
2023
1st 500m Time Trial, United States National Track Championships
1st Keirin, United States National Track Championships
2nd Team Sprint, 2023 Pan American Games with Keely Ainslie and Kayla Hankins
2nd Sprint, United States National Track Championships
2nd Team Sprint, United States National Track Championships
2nd 500m Time Trial, Pan American Track Cycling Championships
3rd Sprint, 2023 Pan American Games
3rd Team Sprint, Pan American Track Cycling Championships
5th Keirin, 2023 Pan American Games
6th Sprint, Pan American Track Cycling Championships
