= Rubén Ramos (cyclist) =

Argentine cyclist (born 1992)

Personal information
- Full name: Rubén Gabriel Ramos Meglioli
- Born: 2 November 1992 (age 33)

Cycling career
- Sport: Cycling
- Current team: Equipo Continental Municipalidad de Pocito
- Discipline: Road
- Role: Rider

Amateur teams
- 2015–2016: Equipo Continental Municipalidad de Pocito
- 2018: Fundación Deporte y Salud Diberboll
- 2018–2019: CS Árbol Verde

Professional teams
- 2016–2017: Tuşnad Cycling Team
- 2020–: Equipo Continental Municipalidad de Pocito
Medal record
Representing Argentina
Men's road bicycle racing
Pan American Championships
Silver medal – second place	2018 San Juan	Time trial
Men's track cycling
Pan American Championships
Bronze medal – third place	2016 Aguascalientes	Points race
Bronze medal – third place	2016 Aguascalientes	Madison
Bronze medal – third place	2018 Aguascalientes	Points race
Bronze medal – third place	2021 Lima	Team pursuit
Bronze medal – third place	2025 Asunción	Omnium
Bronze medal – third place	2025 Asunción	Madison
Bronze medal – third place	2026 Santiago	Madison
South American Games
Gold medal – first place	2026 Santa Fe	Madison
Bronze medal – third place	2026 Santa Fe	Team pursuit

Rubén Gabriel Ramos Meglioli (born 2 November 1992) is an Argentine racing cyclist, who currently rides for UCI Continental team Equipo Continental Municipalidad de Pocito. In 2018, he won the Argentine National Road Race Championships. His brother Duilio Ramos is also a professional cyclist.

== Major results ==
2012
2nd Time trial, National Under-23 Road Championships
2013
1st Stage 7 Giro del Sol San Juan
3rd Time trial, National Under-23 Road Championships
2014
2nd Time trial, National Under-23 Road Championships
2016
10th Overall Tour de Serbie
2017
6th Overall Tour de Serbie
10th Overall Tour de Hongrie
2018
National Road Championships

1st Road race
2nd Time trial

2nd Time trial, Pan American Road Championships
4th Road race, South American Games
