= Zak Kovalcik =

American cyclist

Personal information
- Born: 26 April 1983 (age 43)

Cycling career
- Sport: Cycling
- Discipline: Track cycling
Medal record
Men's track cycling
Representing United States
Pan American Championships
Gold medal – first place	2017 Couva	Madison
Silver medal – second place	2016 Aguascalientes	Scratch
Bronze medal – third place	2016 Aguascalientes	Omnium

Zak Kovalcik (born 26 April 1983) is an American male track cyclist, representing United States at international competitions. In 2014 he won the National Team Pursuit Championships (with Zach Allison, Alexander Darville and Adrian Hegyvary). He won the silver medal at the 2016 Pan American Track Cycling Championships in the scratch.
