= 2019 Pan American Track Cycling Championships =

- Venue: Cochabamba, Bolivia
- Date(s): 4–8 September
- Events: 20

The 2019 Pan American Track Cycling Championships took place at the Velodrome of the Sports Training Center (CEFED) in Cochabamba, Bolivia, from 4 to 8 September 2019.

== Medal summary ==
=== Men ===
Event	Gold	Silver	Bronze
Sprint	Nicholas Paul; Trinidad and Tobago	Jaïr Tjon En Fa; Suriname	Kevin Quintero; Colombia
1 km time trial	Kevin Quintero; Colombia	Santiago Ramírez; Colombia	Vincent De Haître; Canada
Individual pursuit	Ashton Lambie; United States	Brayan Sánchez; Colombia	Jay Lamoureux; Canada
Team pursuit	Canada; Derek Gee; Jay Lamoureux; Vincent De Haître; Michael Foley; Aidan Caves	United States; Daniel Holloway; Ashton Lambie; Eric Young; John Croom; Adrian Hegyvary	Colombia; Brayan Sánchez; Carlos Tobón; Juan Esteban Arango; Wilmar Molina
Team sprint	Trinidad and Tobago; Keron Bramble; Njisane Phillip; Nicholas Paul	Argentina; Farid Suárez; Juan Pablo Serrano; Lucas Vilar	Ecuador; Allan Lozano; Francisco Bone; Pablo Pacheco
Keirin	Kevin Quintero; Colombia	Santiago Ramírez; Colombia	Keron Bramble; Trinidad and Tobago
Scratch	Eric Young; United States	Ignacio Prado; Mexico	Aidan Caves; Canada
Points race	Michael Foley; Canada	Ignacio Sarabia; Mexico	Brayan Sánchez; Colombia
Madison	Mexico; Ignacio Sarabia; Ignacio Prado	United States; Adrian Hegyvary; Daniel Holloway	Chile; Antonio Cabrera; Matías Arriagada
Omnium	Derek Gee; Canada	Ignacio Prado; Mexico	Gavin Hoover; United States

=== Women ===
Event	Gold	Silver	Bronze
Sprint	Kelsey Mitchell; Canada	Martha Bayona; Colombia	Mandy Marquardt; United States
500 m time trial	Jessica Salazar; Mexico	Martha Bayona; Colombia	Daniela Gaxiola; Mexico
Individual pursuit	Georgia Simmerling; Canada	Annie Foreman-Mackey; Canada	Emma White; United States
Team pursuit	Canada; Allison Beveridge; Annie Foreman-Mackey; Ariane Bonhomme; Georgia Simmerling	United States; Christina Birch; Emma White; Kendall Ryan; Lily Williams; Jennifer Valente	Mexico; Jessica Bonilla; María Gaxiola; Mayra Rocha; Sofía Arreola
Team sprint	Canada; Kelsey Mitchell; Lauriane Genest	Mexico; Jessica Salazar; Yuli Verdugo; Daniela Gaxiola	Colombia; Juliana Gaviria; Diana García; Martha Bayona
Keirin	Lauriane Genest; Canada	Martha Bayona; Colombia	Kelsey Mitchell; Canada
Scratch	Jennifer Valente; United States	Lizbeth Salazar; Mexico	Kinley Gibson; Canada
Points race	Jennifer Valente; United States	Sofía Arreola; Mexico	Lina Hernández; Colombia
Madison	United States; Jennifer Valente; Kendall Ryan	Mexico; Jessica Bonilla; Lizbeth Salazar	Brazil; Daniela Lionço; Wellyda dos Santos
Omnium	Jennifer Valente; United States	Allison Beveridge; Canada	Maribel Aguirre; Argentina

== Medal table ==
Rank	Nation	Gold	Silver	Bronze	Total
1	Canada	8	2	5	15
2	United States	6	3	3	12
3	Mexico	2	7	2	11
4	Colombia	2	6	5	13
5	Trinidad and Tobago	2	0	1	3
6	Argentina	0	1	1	2
7	Suriname	0	1	0	1
8	Brazil	0	0	1	1
8	Chile	0	0	1	1
8	Ecuador	0	0	1	1
Totals (10 entries)		20	20	20	60

== Records ==
Gender	Event	Athlete	Country	Result	Record	Date	Ref
Women	Team sprint	Kelsey Mitchell; Lauriane Genest	Canada	32.232	AM	4 September 2019	
Men	Team sprint	Keron Bramble; Njisane Phillip; Nicholas Paul	Trinidad and Tobago	42.395	AM	4 September 2019	
Men	Team sprint	Keron Bramble; Njisane Phillip; Nicholas Paul	Trinidad and Tobago	41.938	AM	4 September 2019	
Women	Flying 200m time trial	Kelsey Mitchell	Canada	10.154	WR, AM	5 September 2019	
Men	Team pursuit	Derek Gee; Jay Lamoureux; Vincent De Haître; Michael Foley	Canada	3:49.974	AM	5 September 2019	
Men	Flying 200m time trial	Nicholas Paul	Trinidad and Tobago	9.100	WR, AM	6 September 2019	
Men	4000m individual pursuit	Ashton Lambie	United States	4:06.407	WR, AM	6 September 2019	
Men	4000m individual pursuit	Ashton Lambie	United States	4:05.423	WR, AM	6 September 2019	
Men	1 km time trial	Kevin Quintero	Colombia	57.508	AM	8 September 2019	
