= Edison Bravo =

Chilean cyclist

Personal information
- Full name: Edison Fernando Bravo Mansilla
- Born: 22 February 1992 (age 34) Puerto Montt, Chile

Cycling career
- Sport: Cycling
- Disciplines: Road; Track
- Role: Rider

Amateur teams
- 2011–2013: Extremadura–Spiuk
- 2015–2016: Club Ciclista Melipulli
- 2017: Team Grottes Berria
- 2019: Team El Constructor

Professional team
- 2014: PinoRoad
Medal record
Representing Chile
Men's track cycling
Pan American Championships
Gold medal – first place	2012 Mar del Plata	Points race
Gold medal – first place	2016 Aguascalientes	Madison
Bronze medal – third place	2016 Aguascalientes	Individual pursuit
Bronze medal – third place	2016 Aguascalientes	Team pursuit

Edison Fernando Bravo Mansilla (born 22 February 1992) is a Chilean cyclist. He competed in the individual pursuit and scratch event at the 2012 UCI Track Cycling World Championships.

== Major results ==
2010
1st road race, Pan American Junior Road Championships
National Junior Road Championships

1st time trial
2nd road race

2011
1st Stages 5 & 6 Vuelta a Palencia
2012
1st Stage 4 Vuelta a Mendoza
1st Stage 4 Vuelta a Palencia
2013
1st Overall Vuelta a Toledo

1st Stage 3

3rd Overall Vuelta a Palencia
5th Overall Vuelta a la Comunidad de Madrid Sub 23
2016
1st road race, National Road Championships
2017
3rd Overall Vuelta Ciclista a Chiloe
