= Tomás Contte =

Argentine cyclist

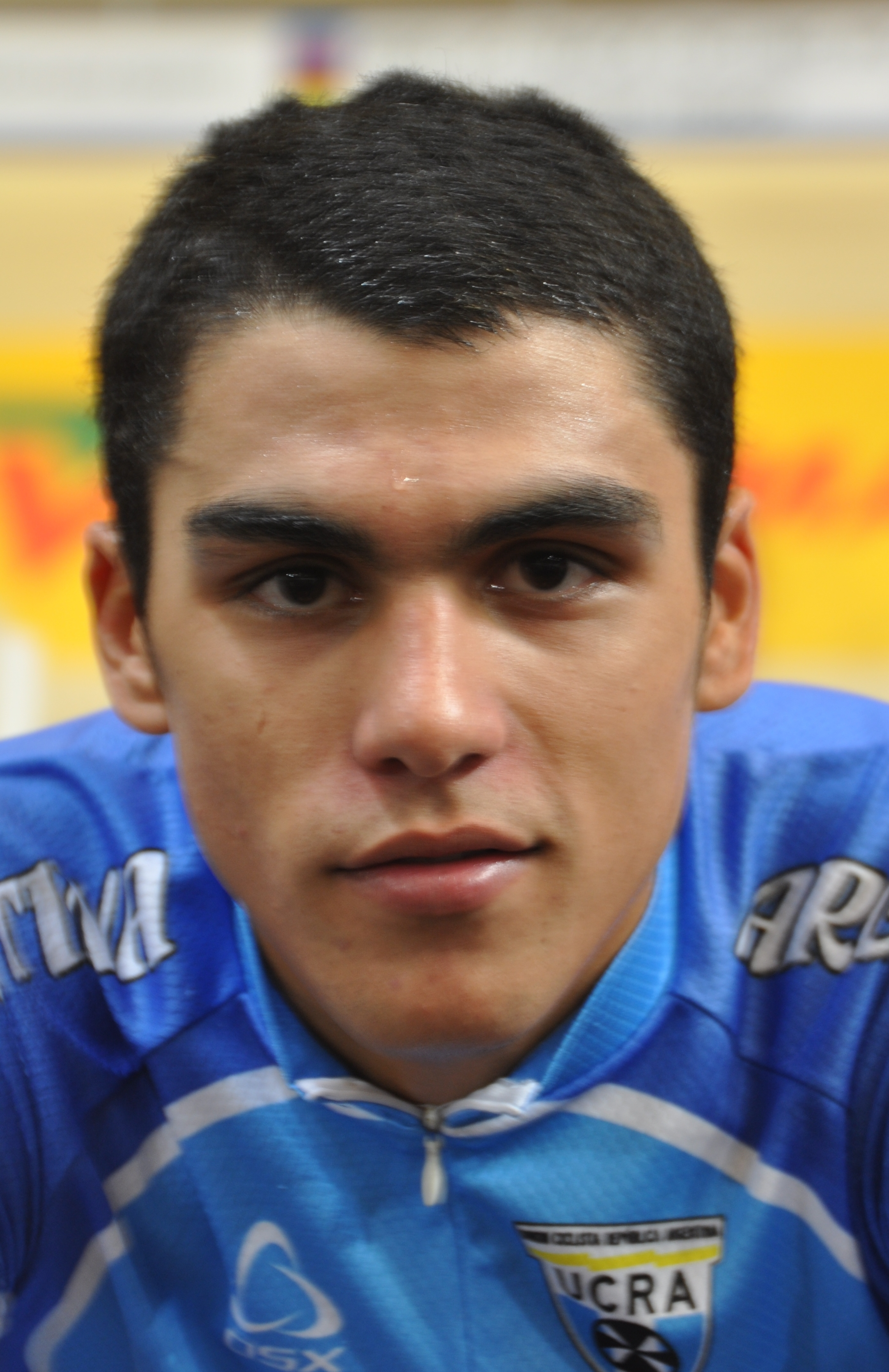
- Contte at the 2018 UCI Track Cycling World Championships

Personal information
- Born: 1 August 1998 (age 28) Zárate, Buenos Aires, Argentina

Cycling career
- Sport: Cycling
- Current team: Aviludo–Louletano–Loulé
- Disciplines: Road; Track
- Role: Rider

Amateur teams
- 2017: World Cycling Centre
- 2018: Municipalidad de Ezeiza
- 2018–2020: SAT
- 2019: Mutua Levante–Alé
- 2020: Netllar Telecom–Alé

Professional teams
- 2020: Equipo Continental Municipalidad de Pocito
- 2021–: Louletano–Loulé Concelho
Medal record
Representing Argentina
Men's track cycling
Pan American Championships
Silver medal – second place	2017 Couva	Madison
Bronze medal – third place	2017 Couva	Omnium
Bronze medal – third place	2021 Lima	Team pursuit
Bronze medal – third place	2021 Lima	Omnium
World Junior Championships
Silver medal – second place	2016 Aigle	Omnium
South American Games
Bronze medal – third place	2026 Santa Fe	Road race

Tomás Contte (born 1 August 1998) is an Argentine cyclist, who currently rides for UCI Continental team Aviludo–Louletano–Loulé.

== Major results ==
=== Road ===
2016
National Junior Road Championships

1st Time trial
2nd Road race

2019
1st Stage 8 Doble Bragado
1st Stage 2 Vuelta a Zamora
3rd Road race, National Under-23 Road Championships
9th Road race, Pan American Games
2024 (1 pro win)
1st Stage 8 Volta a Portugal
2026
1st Mountains classification, Volta ao Algarve

=== Track ===
2016
2nd Omnium, UCI Junior World Championships
2017
Pan American Track Championships

2nd Madison
3rd Omnium

2018
2nd Madison, South American Games
2019
1st Pursuit, National Track Championships
