= Eduardo Estrada (cyclist) =

Colombian cyclist

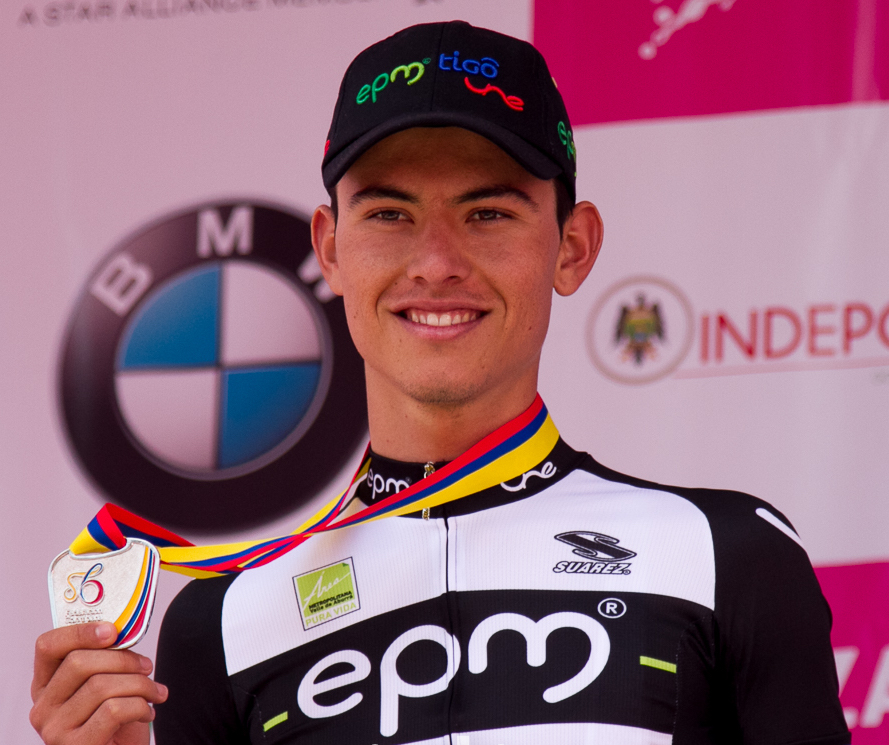
- Estrada in 2016

Personal information
- Full name: Eduardo Estrada Celis
- Born: 25 January 1995 (age 31) Sabana de Torres, Colombia
- Height: 1.84 m (6 ft 0 in)

Cycling career
- Sport: Cycling
- Current team: Nu Colombia
- Disciplines: Road; Track
- Role: Rider
- Rider type: All-rounder

Amateur teams
- 2012: GW–Shimano
- 2013: Gobernación de Antioquia Antioquia–Indeportes
- 2014: Chambéry CF

Professional teams
- 2015: D'Amico–Bottecchia
- 2016: EPM–UNE–Área Metropolitana
- 2017: Medellín–Inder
- 2018–2019: Bicicletas Strongman–Colombia Coldeportes
- 2020–: EPM–Scott
Medal record
Representing Colombia
Men's track cycling
Pan American Championships
| Gold medal – first place | 2016 Aguascalientes | Individual pursuit |
| Gold medal – first place | 2016 Aguascalientes | Team pursuit |
| Silver medal – second place | 2016 Aguascalientes | Madison |

Eduardo Estrada Celis (born 25 January 1995) is a Colombian cyclist, who currently rides for UCI Continental team Nu Colombia.

== Major results ==
2011
1st Road race, National Junior Road Championships
2014
1st Team pursuit, Central American and Caribbean Games
2016
2nd Time trial, National Under-23 Road Championships
