= Juan Pablo Serrano =

Argentine cyclist

Personal information
- Full name: Juan Pablo Serrano Esper
- Born: 8 August 1994 (age 32)

Cycling career
- Sport: Cycling
- Discipline: Track cycling
Medal record
Men's track cycling
Representing Argentina
Pan American Championships
Silver medal – second place	2016 Aguascalientes	Team sprint
Silver medal – second place	2019 Cochabamba	Team sprint
Bronze medal – third place	2017 Couva	Team sprint

Juan Pablo Serrano Esper (born 8 August 1994) is an Argentine track cyclist who won a silver medal at the 2016 Pan American Track Cycling Championships in the team sprint.
