= Pablo Perruchoud =

Argentine track cyclist (born 1992)

Personal information
- Born: 2 February 1992 (age 34)

Cycling career
- Sport: Cycling
- Discipline: Track cycling
Medal record
Men's track cycling
Representing Argentina
Pan American Championships
Silver medal – second place	2016 Aguascalientes	Team sprint
Bronze medal – third place	2017 Couva	Team sprint

Pablo Perruchoud (born 2 February 1992) is an Argentine male track cyclist, representing Argentina at international competitions. He won the silver medal at the 2016 Pan American Track Cycling Championships in the team sprint.
