= Aidan Caves =

Canadian cyclist (born 1995)

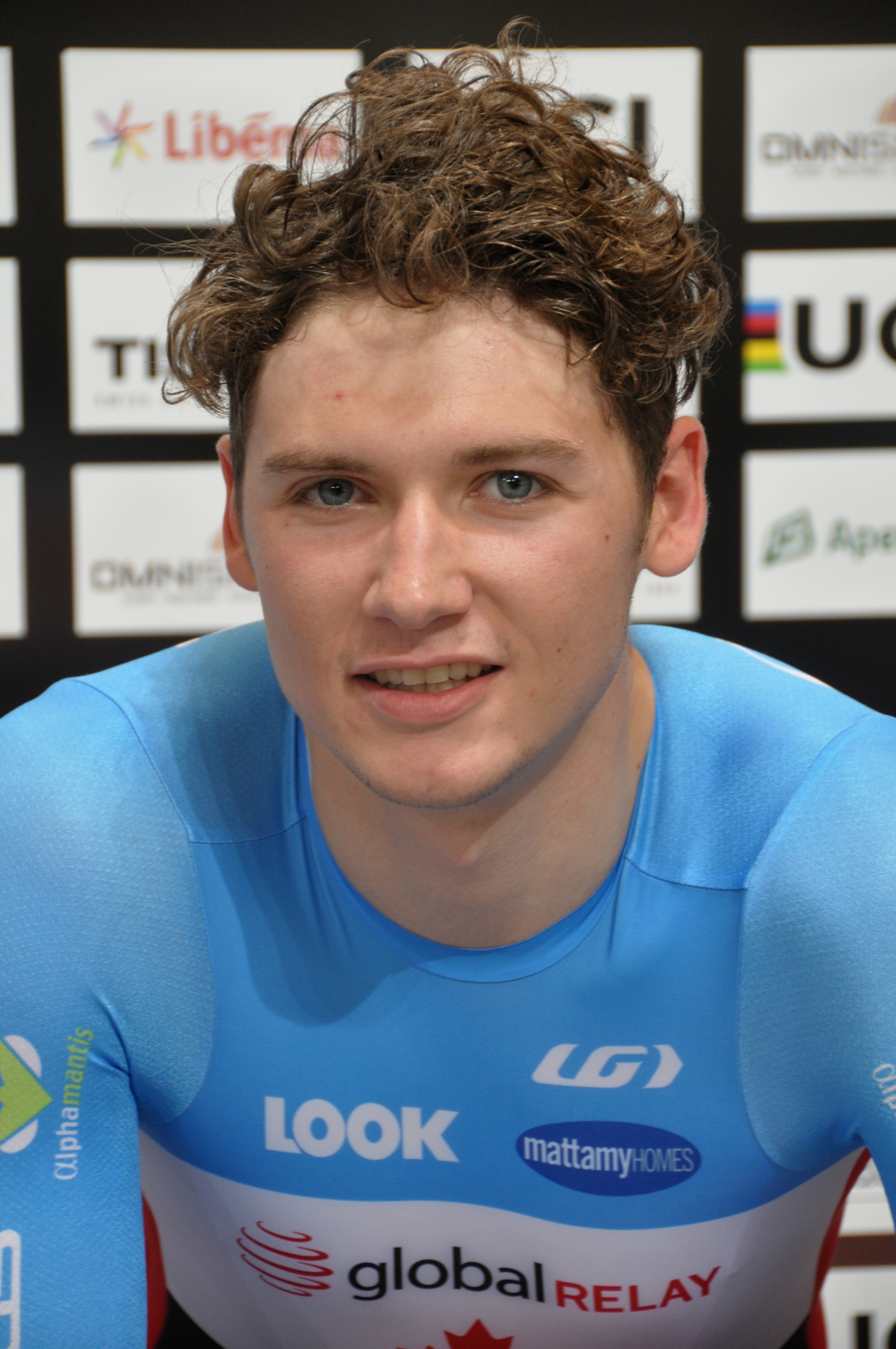
- Caves in 2016

Personal information
- Full name: Aidan Michael Caves
- Born: 3 January 1995 (age 31) Vancouver, British Columbia, Canada
- Height: 1.78 m (5 ft 10 in)
- Weight: 78 kg (172 lb)

Cycling career
- Sport: Cycling
- Current team: Toronto Velodrome Club / RaceClean / Team Canada
- Discipline: Track cycling / Road cycling
- Role: Rider
- Rider type: Sprinter
Medal record
Men's track cycling
Representing Canada
Commonwealth Games
Bronze medal – third place	2018 Gold Coast	Team pursuit
Pan American Championships
Gold medal – first place	2019 Bolivia	Team Pursuit
Gold medal – first place	2016 Aguascalientes	Omnium
Gold medal – first place	2017 Balmain	Team pursuit
Silver medal – second place	2019 Bolivia	Scratch Race
Silver medal – second place	2015 Santiago	Scratch race
Silver medal – second place	2015 Santiago	Team pursuit
Silver medal – second place	2016 Aguascalientes	Team pursuit
Silver medal – second place	2017 Balmain	Omnium
Canadian Championships
Gold medal – first place	x11

Aidan Caves (born 3 January 1995) is a Canadian professional track cyclist. He won the silver medal at the 2015 Pan American Track Cycling Championships in the scratch and at the 2016 Pan American Track Cycling Championships in the team pursuit also setting the Canadian Record with his teammates. Later he went on to win the gold medal and champions jersey in the Omnium at 2016 Pan American Track Cycling Championships. Back in 2014, he participated at the 2014 Commonwealth Games. In 2018, he won Silver at the 2018 Commonwealth Games He has 11 National Championship wins throughout his career, along with multiple medals at World Cups and three Pan American Titles.
