= 2016 Pan American Track Cycling Championships =

- Venue: Aguascalientes, Mexico
- Date: October 5–9, 2016
- Velodrome: Velódromo Bicentenario
- Nations participating: 15
- Events: 19

The 2016 Pan American Track Cycling Championships took place at the Velódromo Bicentenario, Aguascalientes, Mexico, October 5–9, 2016.

== Medal summary ==
=== Men ===
Event	Gold	Silver	Bronze
Sprint	Fabián Puerta; Colombia	Jair Tjon En Fa; Suriname	Santiago Ramírez; Colombia
1 km time trial	Santiago Ramírez; Colombia	Diego Peña; Colombia	Stefan Ritter; Canada
Keirin	Fabián Puerta; Colombia	Leandro Bottasso; Argentina	Kwesi Browne; Trinidad and Tobago
Scratch	José Alfredo Santoyo; Mexico	Zak Kovalcik; United States	Edwing Sutherland; Barbados
Points race	Juan Esteban Arango; Colombia	Manuel Rodas; Guatemala	Ruben Ramos; Argentina
Individual pursuit	Eduardo Estrada; Colombia	Jay Lamoureux; Canada	Edison Bravo; Chile
Omnium	Aidan Caves; Canada	Julio Padilla; Guatemala	Zak Kovalcik; United States
Madison	Chile; Antonio Cabrera; Edison Bravo	Colombia; Eduardo Estrada; Jordan Parra	Argentina; Ruben Ramos; Sebastian Trillini
Team sprint	Colombia; Rubén Murillo; Fabián Puerta; Santiago Ramírez	Argentina; Leandro Bottasso; Pablo Perruchoud; Juan Pablo Serrano	Canada; Patrice Pivin; Joel Archambault; Stefan Ritter
Team pursuit	Colombia; Juan Esteban Arango; Brayan Sánchez; Eduardo Estrada; Wilmar Paredes	Canada; Ed Veal; Aidan Caves; Jay Lamoureux; Adam Jamieson	Chile; Antonio Cabrera; Edison Bravo; Nicolás González; Diego Ferreyra

=== Women ===
Event	Gold	Silver	Bronze
Sprint	Jessica Salazar; Mexico	Yuli Verdugo; Mexico	Daniela Gaxiola; Mexico
500 m time trial	Jessica Salazar; Mexico (Note: Jessica Salazar set a world record of 32"268 to win the women's 500m time trial.)	Martha Bayona; Colombia	Juliana Gaviria; Colombia
Keirin	Daniela Gaxiola; Mexico	Juliana Gaviria; Colombia	Martha Bayona; Colombia
Individual pursuit	Kelly Catlin; United States	Marlies Mejías; Cuba	Jasmin Glaesser; Canada
Points race	Jasmin Glaesser; Canada	Arlenis Sierra; Cuba	Ariane Bonhomme; Canada
Scratch	Yareli Salazar; Mexico	Paola Muñoz; Chile	Arlenis Sierra; Cuba
Omnium	Marlies Mejías; Cuba	Yareli Salazar; Mexico	Yeny Lorena Colmenares; Colombia
Madison (Note: Held as an exhibition event. No medals were awarded for this discipline.)	Mexico; Mayra Rocha; Sofía Arreola	United States; Colleen Gulick; Christina Birch	Cuba; Marlies Mejías; Iraida Garcia
Team sprint	Mexico; Jessica Salazar; Yuli Verdugo	Colombia; Juliana Gaviria; Martha Bayona	United States; Mandy Marquardt; Madalyn Godby
Team pursuit	Canada; Jasmin Glaesser; Ariane Bonhomme; Kinley Gibson; Jamie Gilgen	Mexico; Yareli Salazar; Mayra Rocha; Sofía Arreola; Jessica Bonilla	Chile; Javiera Reyes; Constanza Paredes; Carolina Oyarzo; Paola Muñoz

== Records ==
In addition to the women's 500m time trial world record, Pan American records were also set in the following events:

- Men's sprint (flying 200m time trial/qualifying round): 9"487 by Fabián Puerta
- Men's 1 km time trial: 59"135 by Santiago Ramírez
- Men's individual pursuit (bronze medal final): 4'13"007 by Edison Bravo
- Men's team sprint (gold medal final): 42"772 by Colombia (Rubén Murillo, Fabián Puerta and Santiago Ramírez)
- Men's team pursuit (gold medal final): 3'55"362 by Colombia (Juan Arango, Brayan Sánchez, Eduardo Estrada and Wilmar Paredes)
- Women's sprint (flying 200m time trial/qualifying round): 10"474 by Jessica Salazar
- Women's team sprint (qualifying round): 32"568 by Mexico (Jessica Salazar and Yuli Verdugo)

== Medal table ==
Rank	Nation	Gold	Silver	Bronze	Total
1	Colombia (COL)	7	5	4	16
2	Mexico (MEX)	6	3	1	10
3	Canada (CAN)	3	2	4	9
4	Cuba (CUB)	1	2	1	4
5	Chile (CHI)	1	1	3	5
6	United States (USA)	1	1	2	4
7	Argentina (ARG)	0	2	2	4
8	Guatemala (GUA)	0	2	0	2
9	Suriname (SUR)	0	1	0	1
10	Barbados (BAR)	0	0	1	1
10	Trinidad and Tobago (TTO)	0	0	1	1
Totals (11 entries)		19	19	19	57
