= Derek Gee-West =

Canadian cyclist (born 1997)

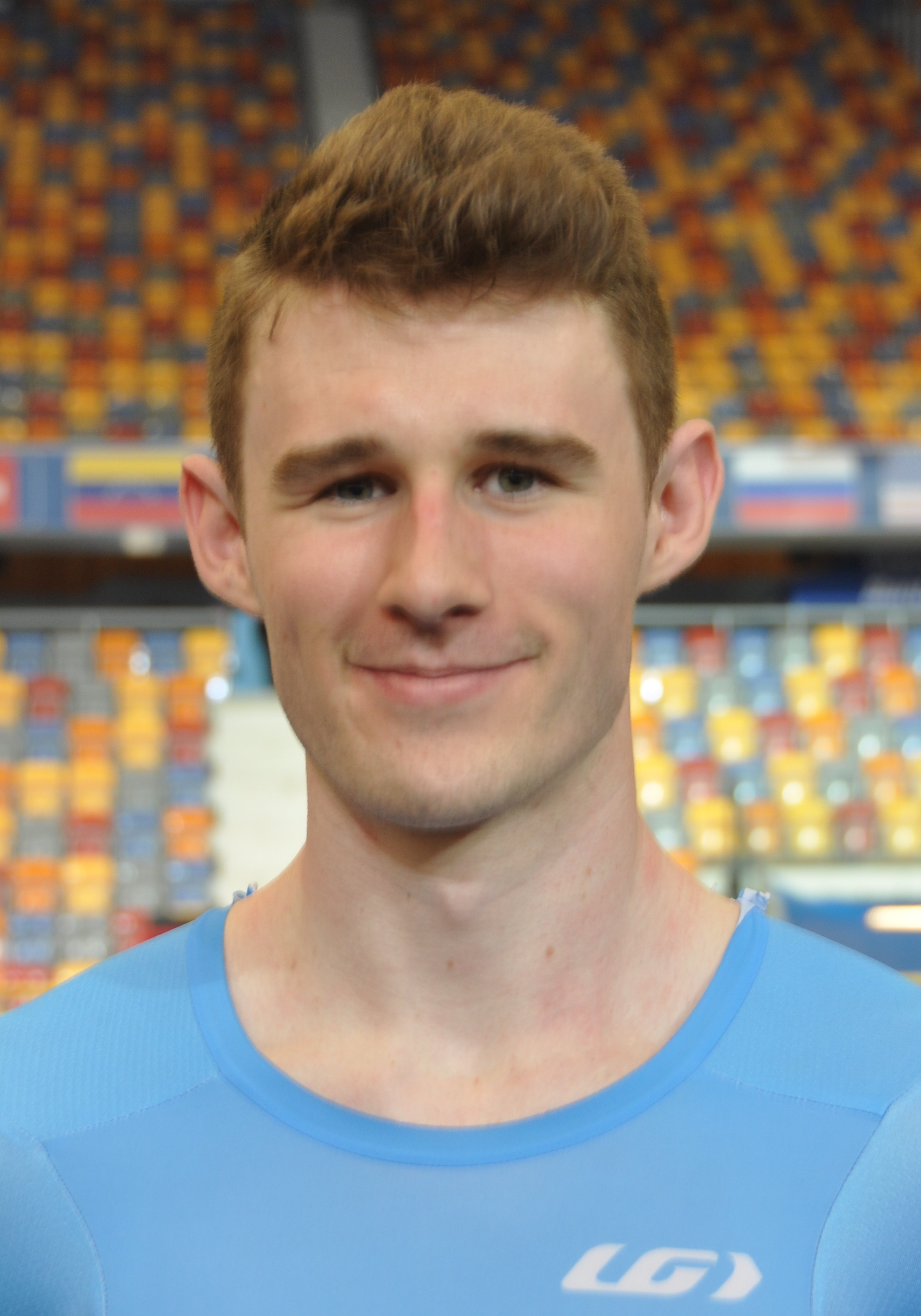
- Gee-West at the 2018 UCI Track Cycling World Championships

Personal information
- Full name: Derek Gee-West
- Born: 3 August 1997 (age 29) Ottawa, Ontario, Canada
- Height: 189 cm (6 ft 2 in)
- Weight: 78 kg (172 lb)

Cycling career
- Sport: Cycling
- Current team: Lidl–Trek
- Disciplines: Track; Road
- Role: Rider
- Rider type: All-rounder, Breakaway specialist

Amateur teams
- 2010–2015: Ottawa Bicycle Club
- 2016–2017: Giant Langley–Smart Savvy+
- 2017–2018: RaceClean

Professional teams
- 2021: XSpeed United Continental
- 2022: Israel Cycling Academy
- 2023–2025: Israel–Premier Tech
- 2026–: Lidl–Trek

Major wins
- Grand Tours Giro d'Italia Combativity award (2023) One-day races and Classics National Road Race Championships (2025) National Time Trial Championships (2022, 2023, 2026)
Medal record
Men's track cycling
Representing Canada
Commonwealth Games
Bronze medal – third place	2018 Gold Coast	Team pursuit
Pan American Championships
Gold medal – first place	2017 Balmain	Team pursuit
Gold medal – first place	2017 Balmain	Individual pursuit
Gold medal – first place	2019 Cochabamba	Team pursuit
Gold medal – first place	2019 Cochabamba	Omnium

Derek Gee-West (né Gee; born 3 August 1997) is a Canadian professional cyclist who rides for UCI WorldTeam Lidl–Trek.

== Career ==
He rode in the men's team pursuit event at the 2018 UCI Track Cycling World Championships. He qualified to represent Canada at the 2020 Summer Olympics.

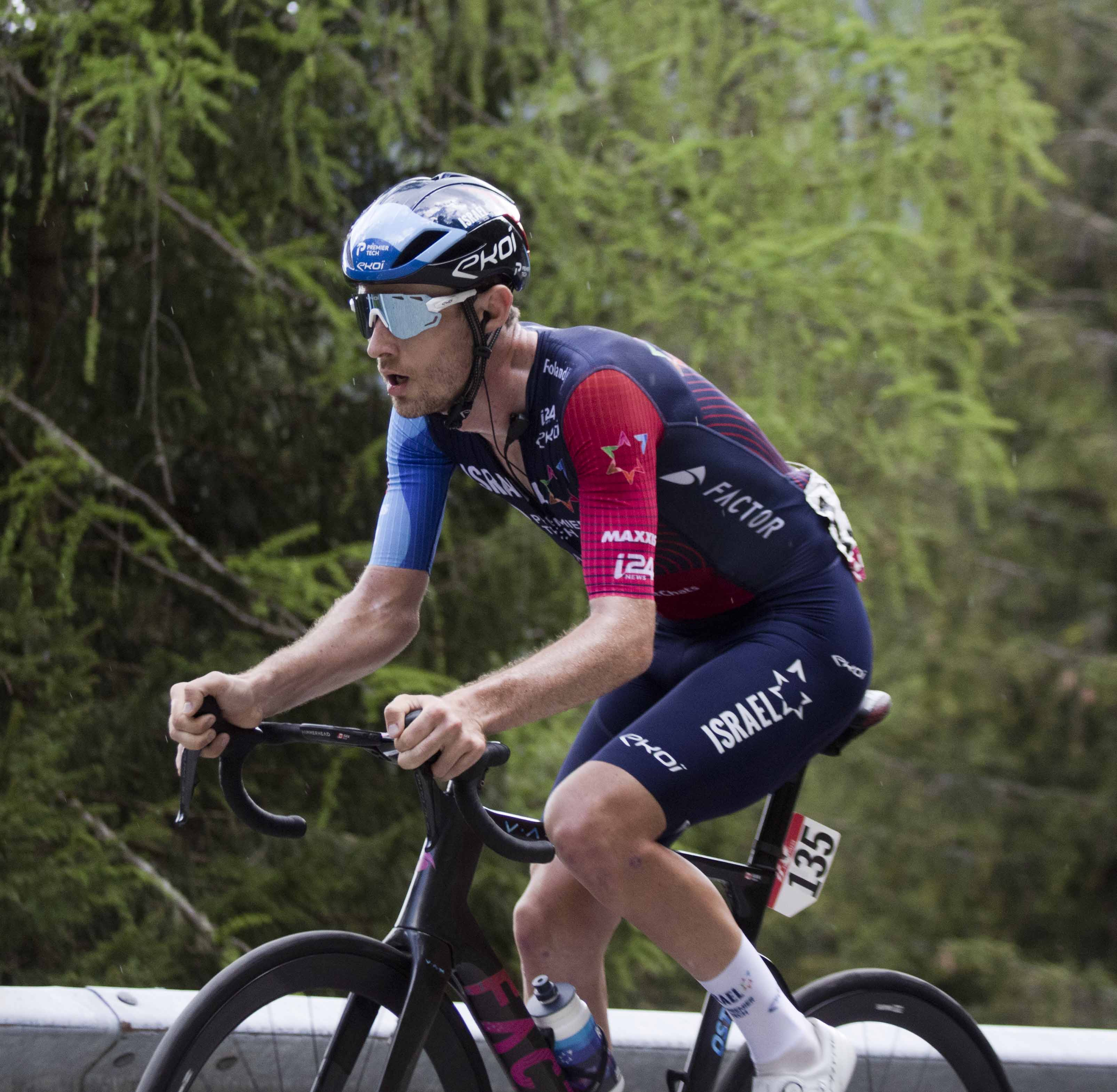
Gee-West at the 2023 Giro d'Italia

Gee-West rode in the 2023 Giro d'Italia, which was his first Grand Tour as well as in his first season on the UCI World Tour. He placed second on four stages and fourth on two others, while having no victories. He also finished second overall in the points classification, the intermediate sprints classification and the mountains classification. He was also awarded the Combativity award on stages 10, 14 and 19, all of which he placed second on, as well as the overall most combative rider award.

In 2024, Gee-West won stage 3 at the 2024 Critérium du Dauphiné, out-sprinting a small pack in a hilltop finish, and went on to finish third overall in the one-week stage race. He next competed in the Tour de France, his first time entering the race, finishing third on stage nine. He ultimately finished 9th overall. Gee-West later was out for two months after breaking his collarbone in a crash.

After being left out of the 2025 Vuelta a España, it was revealed he had sent his Israel–Premier Tech team a notice of termination. In a statement published on social media in October 2025, Gee-West said that the move was due to "an irreparable relationship with the team principal, as well as serious concerns related to racing for the team, both from a safety and personal-belief standpoint", and indicated that the team were seeking damages of about €30m from him for ending the contract.

Gee-West announced that was he was joining Lidl-Trek for the 2026 cycling season.

== Personal life ==
In November 2025, Gee-West began using a hyphenated surname following his marriage to Canadian cyclocross, track, and gravel racer Ruby West.

== Major results ==
=== Road ===
2015
National Junior Championships

1st Road race
1st Time trial

2nd Overall Ronde des Vallées
7th Overall Tour de l'Abitibi
2017
Challenge du Prince

5th Trophée Princier
7th Trophée de l'Anniversaire

2019
4th Time trial, National Championships
2021
National Championships

3rd Road race
3rd Time trial

2022 (1 pro win)
1st Time trial, National Championships
8th Grand Prix de la Ville de Lillers
2023 (1)
1st Time trial, National Championships
10th Brussels Cycling Classic
10th Chrono des Nations
Giro d'Italia

Combativity award Stages 10, 14, 19 & Overall

2024 (1)
3rd Overall Critérium du Dauphiné

1st Stage 3

9th Overall Tour de France
2025 (3)
National Championships

1st Road race
2nd Time trial

1st Overall O Gran Camiño

1st Mountains classification
1st Stage 3 (ITT)

3rd Overall Tour of the Alps
4th Overall Giro d'Italia
4th Overall Tirreno–Adriatico
2026 (1)
1st Time trial, National Championships
5th Overall Giro d'Italia
7th Overall UAE Tour

=== General classification results timeline ===
Grand Tour general classification results
Grand Tour	2023	2024	2025	2026
Giro d'Italia	22	—	4	5
Tour de France	—	9	—	25
Vuelta a España	—	—	—	
Major stage race general classification results
Race	2023	2024	2025	2026
Paris–Nice	—	—	—	—
Tirreno–Adriatico	41	—	4	—
Volta a Catalunya	—	—	—	DNF
Tour of the Basque Country	—	—	—	—
Tour de Romandie	—	—	—	—
Critérium du Dauphiné	—	3	—	—
Tour de Suisse	—	—	—	—

=== Track ===
2016
2nd Omnium, National Championships
2017
Pan American Championships

1st Individual pursuit
1st Team pursuit

National Championships

1st Individual pursuit
1st Team pursuit
1st Omnium
1st Madison (with Evan Burtnik)
1st Points race

2nd Team pursuit, UCI World Cup, Milton
2018
National Championships

1st Individual pursuit
1st Team pursuit
1st Omnium
1st Madison (with Michael Foley)
1st Points race
2nd Team pursuit

3rd Team pursuit, Commonwealth Games
3rd Team pursuit, UCI World Cup, Berlin
2019
Pan American Championships

1st Omnium
1st Team pursuit

National Championships

1st Individual pursuit
1st Omnium
1st Madison (with Michael Foley)
2nd Team pursuit

2nd Team pursuit, UCI World Cup, Cambridge
2020
National Championships

1st Individual pursuit
1st Omnium
3rd Team pursuit
