= Ahmed López =

Cuban cyclist (born 1984)

Personal information
- Born: 11 November 1984 (age 41) Havana, Cuba

Cycling career
- Sport: Cycling
Medal record
Representing Cuba
Pan American Games
Gold medal – first place	2003 Santo Domingo	1km time trial
Gold medal – first place	2003 Santo Domingo	Team sprint
Gold medal – first place	2007 Rio de Janeiro	Team sprint
Central American and Caribbean Games
Silver medal – second place	2006 Cartagena	Individual sprint

Ahmed López Naranjo (born 11 November 1984) is a Cuban cyclist. He competed in two events at the 2004 Summer Olympics.
