= Yuli Verdugo =

Mexican cyclist

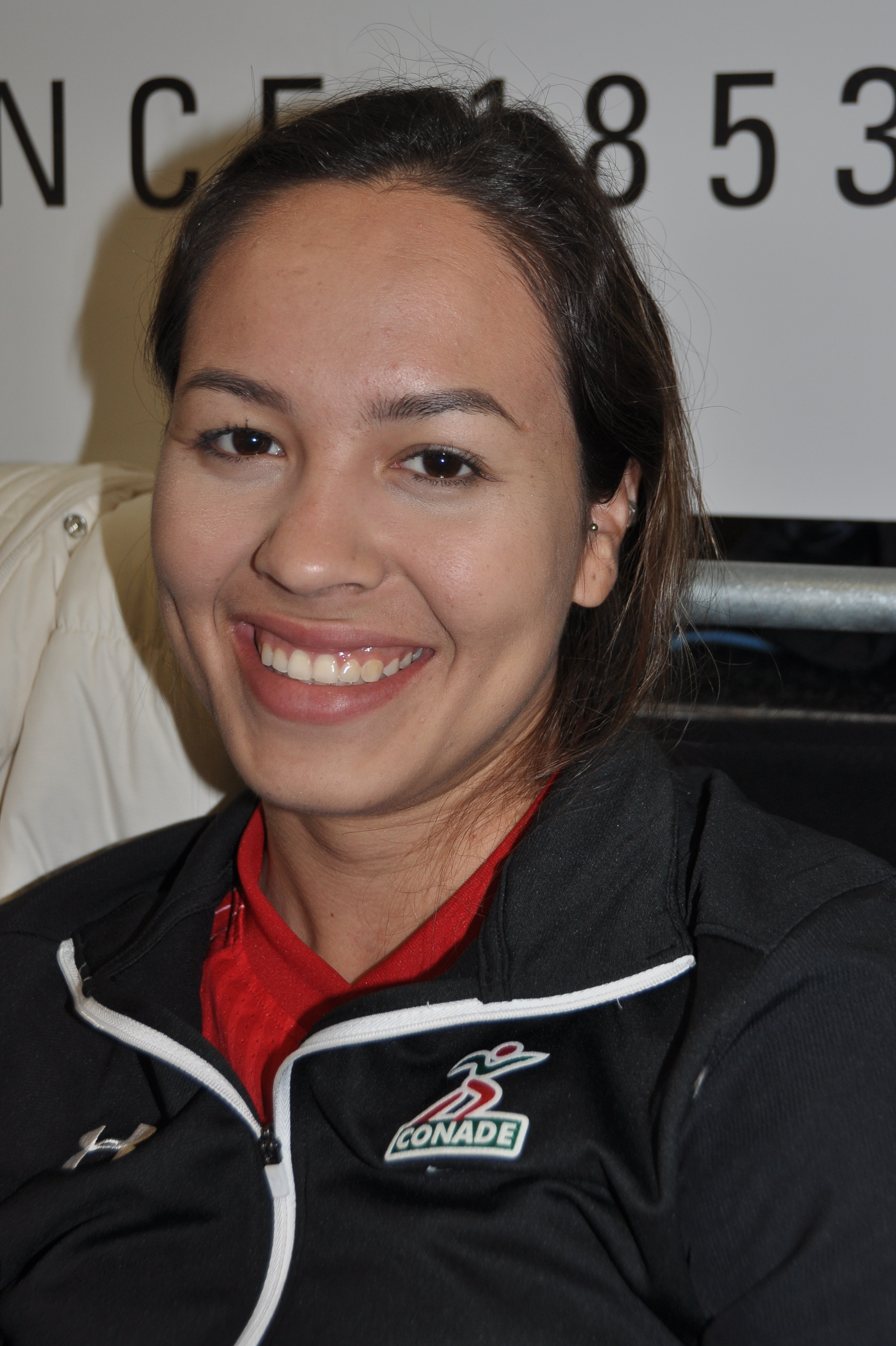
- Verdugo in 2018

Personal information
- Full name: Yuli Paola Verdugo Osuna
- Born: 29 June 1997 (age 29) La Paz, Baja California Sur, Mexico

Cycling career
- Sport: Cycling
- Discipline: Track cycling
Medal record
Women's track cycling
Representing Mexico
Pan American Games
Gold medal – first place	2023 Santiago	Team sprint
Silver medal – second place	2023 Santiago	Sprint
Bronze medal – third place	2019 Lima	Keirin
Pan American Championships
Gold medal – first place	2016 Aguascalientes	Team sprint
Gold medal – first place	2018 Aguascalientes	Team sprint
Gold medal – first place	2021 Lima	Keirin
Gold medal – first place	2023 San Juan	Team sprint
Gold medal – first place	2024 Carson	Team sprint
Gold medal – first place	2026 Santiago	Team sprint
Silver medal – second place	2016 Aguascalientes	Sprint
Silver medal – second place	2017 Couva	Sprint
Silver medal – second place	2019 Cochabamba	Team sprint
Silver medal – second place	2021 Lima	Sprint
Silver medal – second place	2021 Lima	Team sprint
Silver medal – second place	2022 Lima	Team sprint
Silver medal – second place	2025 Asunción	Keirin
Bronze medal – third place	2022 Lima	Sprint
Bronze medal – third place	2023 San Juan	Sprint
Central American and Caribbean Games
Gold medal – first place	2023 San Salvador	Team sprint
Gold medal – first place	2026 Santo Domingo	Team sprint
Bronze medal – third place	2018 Barranquilla	Sprint
Bronze medal – third place	2023 San Salvador	Keirin
Bronze medal – third place	2023 San Salvador	Sprint
Bronze medal – third place	2026 Santo Domingo	Keirin
Bronze medal – third place	2026 Santo Domingo	Sprint

Yuli Paola Verdugo Osuna (born 29 June 1997) is a Mexican female track cyclist, representing Mexico at international competitions. She won the gold medal at the 2016 Pan American Track Cycling Championships in the team sprint.

== Career results ==
2016
Pan American Track Championships

1st Team Sprint (with Jessica Salazar)
2nd Sprint

Copa Cuba de Pista

1st Keirin
1st Sprint
1st 500m Time Trial
