= Santiago Ramírez (cyclist) =

Colombian cyclist (born 1994)

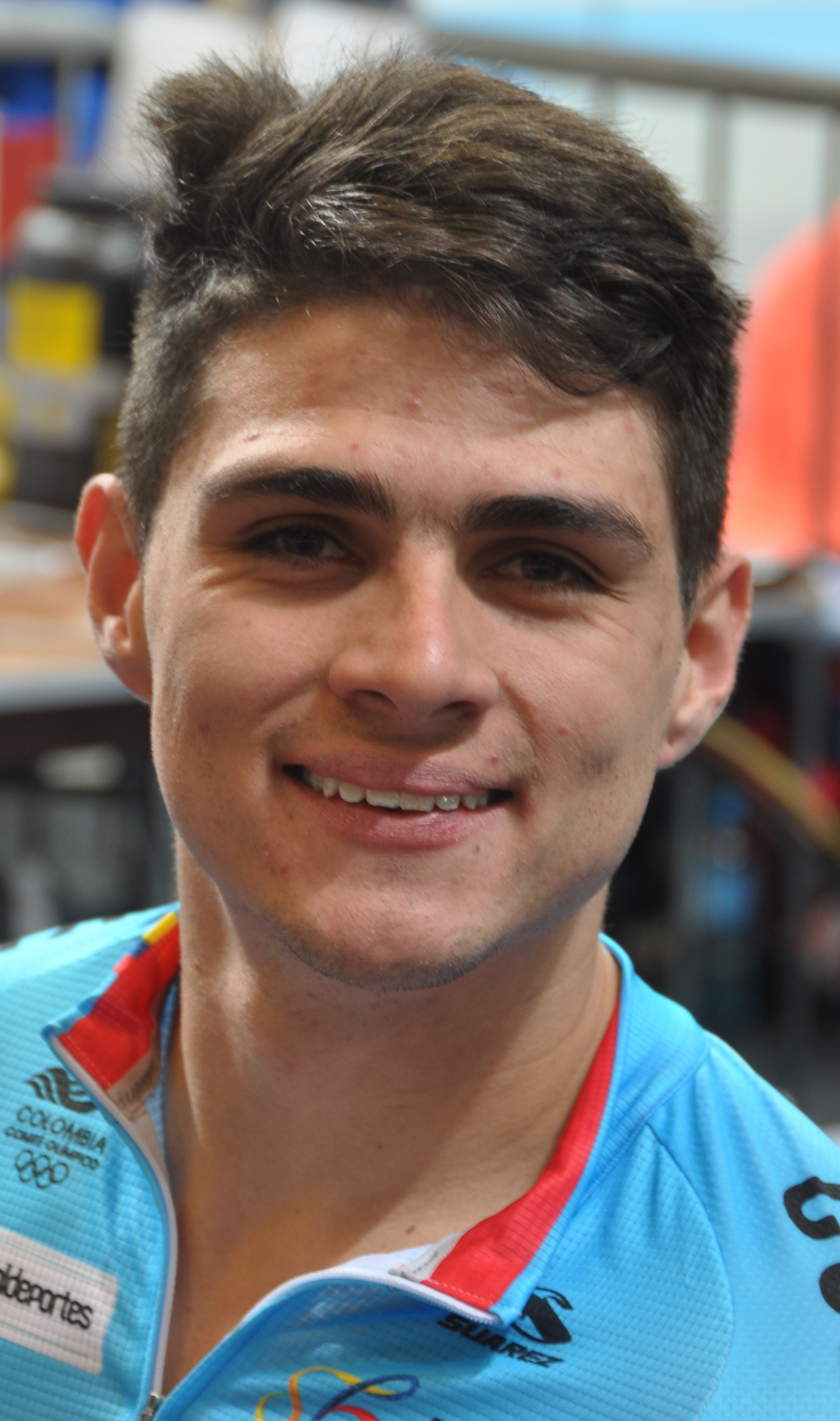
- Ramírez in 2018

Personal information
- Full name: Santiago Ramírez Morales
- Born: 20 July 1994 (age 32) Cali, Colombia
- Height: 1.83 m (6 ft 0 in)
- Weight: 85 kg (187 lb)

Cycling career
- Sport: Cycling
- Current team: Colombia
- Discipline: Track cycling
- Role: Rider
- Rider type: Sprinter
Medal record
Representing Colombia
Men's track cycling
Event	1st	2nd	3rd
Nations Cup	2	2	1
Nations Cup stage	0	3	3
Champions League stage	0	1	0
Pan American Games	1	0	0
Pan American Championships	9	12	7
South American Games	0	1	0
Bolivarian Games	2	6	0
Total	14	25	11
Nations Cup
Gold medal – first place	2021	1 km time trial
Gold medal – first place	2022	1 km time trial
Silver medal – second place	2021	Sprint
Silver medal – second place	2022	Team sprint
Bronze medal – third place	2021	Keirin
Pan American Games
Gold medal – first place	2019 Lima	Team sprint
Pan American Championships
Gold medal – first place	2015 Santiago	1 km time trial
Gold medal – first place	2016 Aguascalientes	1 km time trial
Gold medal – first place	2016 Aguascalientes	Team sprint
Gold medal – first place	2017 Couva	Team sprint
Gold medal – first place	2018 Aguascalientes	1 km time trial
Gold medal – first place	2021 Lima	Team sprint
Gold medal – first place	2022 Lima	1 km time trial
Gold medal – first place	2024 Carson	1 km time trial
Gold medal – first place	2024 Carson	Team sprint
Silver medal – second place	2013 Mexico City	Keirin
Silver medal – second place	2014 Aguascalientes	Team sprint
Silver medal – second place	2017 Couva	1 km time trial
Silver medal – second place	2018 Aguascalientes	Keirin
Silver medal – second place	2018 Aguascalientes	Team sprint
Silver medal – second place	2019 Cochabamba	Keirin
Silver medal – second place	2019 Cochabamba	1 km time trial
Silver medal – second place	2021 Lima	Keirin
Silver medal – second place	2021 Lima	Sprint
Silver medal – second place	2021 Lima	1 km time trial
Silver medal – second place	2023 San Juan	1 km time trial
Silver medal – second place	2026 Santiago	Team sprint
Bronze medal – third place	2013 Mexico City	Sprint
Bronze medal – third place	2014 Aguascalientes	Sprint
Bronze medal – third place	2014 Aguascalientes	1 km time trial
Bronze medal – third place	2016 Aguascalientes	Sprint
Bronze medal – third place	2022 Lima	Keirin
Bronze medal – third place	2022 Lima	Team sprint
Bronze medal – third place	2024 Carson	Sprint
South American Games
Silver medal – second place	2014 Santiago	Team sprint
Bolivarian Games
Gold medal – first place	2017 Santa Marta	Team sprint
Gold medal – first place	2022 Valledupar	Team sprint
Silver medal – second place	2013 Trujillo	1 km time trial
Silver medal – second place	2013 Trujillo	Team sprint
Silver medal – second place	2017 Santa Marta	Keirin
Silver medal – second place	2017 Santa Marta	Sprint
Silver medal – second place	2022 Valledupar	Keirin
Silver medal – second place	2022 Valledupar	Sprint

Santiago Ramírez Morales (born 20 July 1994) is a Colombian track cyclist. He competed in the team sprint at the 2014 UCI Track Cycling World Championships.

== Major results ==
2013
UCI World Cup

2nd Keirin, Guadalajara

2021
UCI Nations Cup

1st Overall Kilometer
3rd Keirin, Cali
3rd Kilometer, Cali

2022
UCI Nations Cup

1st Overall Kilometer
2nd Kilometer, Milton
2nd Kilometer, Cali
2nd Team sprint, Cali

== See also ==
- List of Track Cycling Nations Cup medalists
