= Jay Lamoureux =

Canadian cyclist (born 1995)

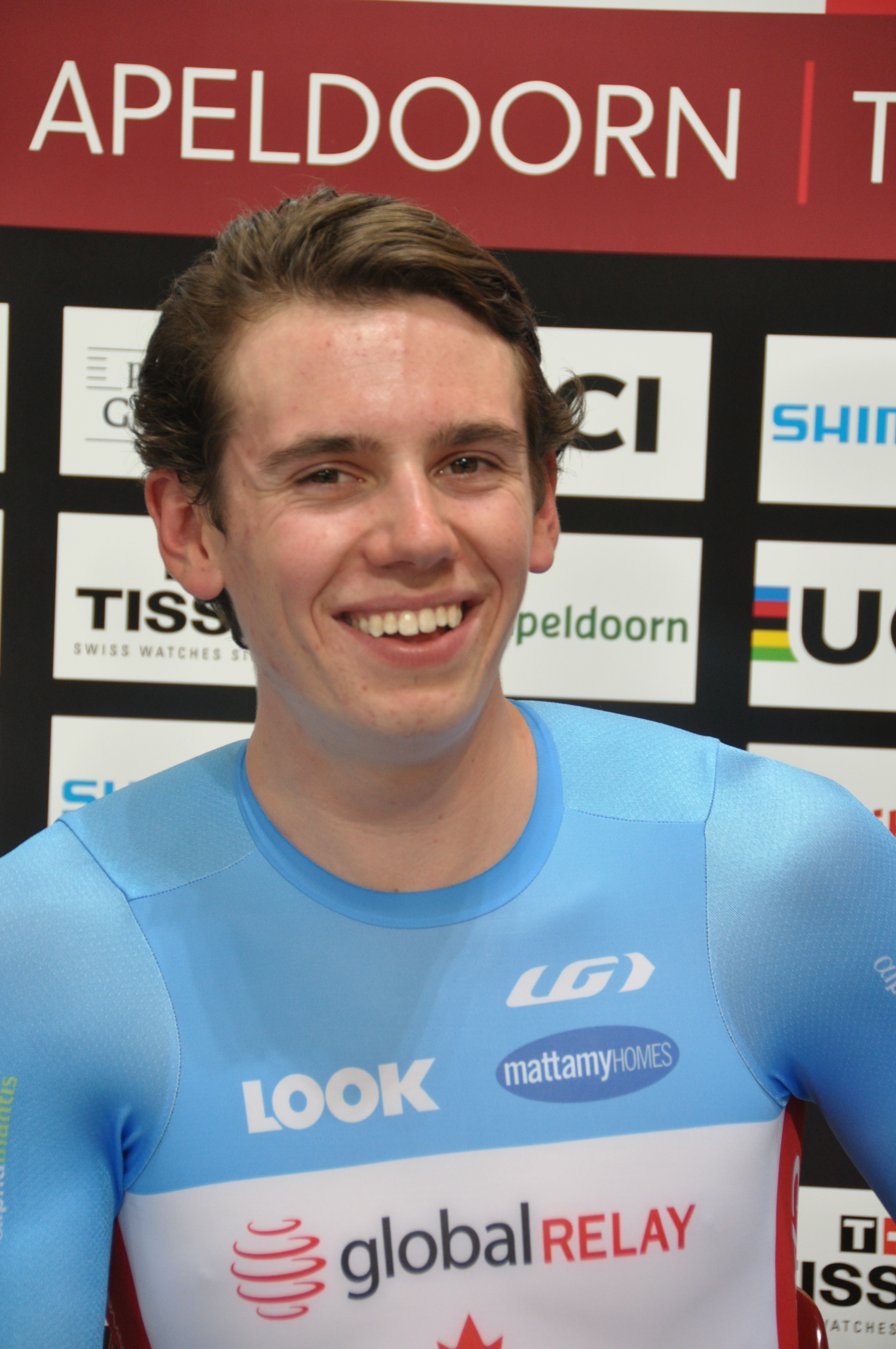
- Jay Lamoureux (2016)

Personal information
- Born: 13 August 1995 (age 31) Victoria, British Columbia, Canada
- Height: 178 cm (5 ft 10 in)
- Weight: 73 kg (161 lb)

Cycling career
- Sport: Cycling
- Disciplines: Road and Track cycling
- Role: Rider

Amateur teams
- 2015: Trek Red Truck Racing
- 2016: Team RaceClean
Medal record
Men's track cycling
Representing Canada
Commonwealth Games
Bronze medal – third place	2018 Gold Coast	Team pursuit
Pan American Championships
Gold medal – first place	2017 Balmain	Team pursuit
Gold medal – first place	2019 Cochabamba	Team pursuit
Silver medal – second place	2016 Aguascalientes	Individual pursuit
Silver medal – second place	2016 Aguascalientes	Team pursuit
Silver medal – second place	2017 Balmain	Individual pursuit
Bronze medal – third place	2019 Cochabamba	Individual pursuit

Jay Lamoureux (born 13 August 1995) is a Canadian male road and track cyclist, representing Canada at international competitions. He won the silver medal at the 2016 Pan American Track Cycling Championships in the individual pursuit and the team pursuit.

As an under-23 rider he won the bronze medal at the Canadian National Road Race Championships.

He has qualified to represent Canada at the 2020 Summer Olympics.

== Major results ==
2014
3rd National Under-23 Road Race Championships
2015
3rd National Individual Pursuit Championships
2016
Pan American Track Championships

2nd Individual pursuit
2nd Team pursuit

1st Apeldoorn World Cup Team Pursuit
2018
3rd Commonwealth Games Team Pursuit
3rd Berlin, GER World Cup Team Pursuit
2019
2nd Cambridge, NZ World Cup Team Pursuit
4th Pruszkow, POL World Championships Team Pursuit
