= Cycling at the 2015 Pan American Games – Men's team pursuit =

Cycling – Men's team pursuit at the 2015 Pan American Games
- Venue: Milton Velodrome
- Dates: July 18
- Competitors: 31 from 7 nations
- Winning score: 4:03.310

Medalists
Gold medal	Juan Esteban Arango; Arles Castro; Fernando Gaviria; Jhonatan Restrepo	Colombia
Silver medal	Mauro Agostini; Maximiliano Richeze; Juan Merlos; Adrián Richeze; Walter Pérez	Argentina
Bronze medal	Eric Johnstone; Sean MacKinnon; Rémi Pelletier-Roy; Edward Veal; Adam Jamieson	Canada

The men's team pursuit competition of the cycling events at the 2015 Pan American Games was held on July 18 at the Milton Velodrome in Milton, Ontario.

== Schedule ==
All times are Eastern Standard Time (UTC-3).

Date	Time	Round
July 18, 2015	11:24	Qualifying
July 18, 2015	18:18	First Round
July 19, 2015	18:11	Final

== Results ==
8 teams of four competitors competed. The top two teams will race for gold, while third and fourth race for the bronze medals.

=== Qualification ===
Rank	Nation	Name	Time	Notes
1	Colombia	Juan Esteban Arango; Arles Castro; Fernando Gaviria; Jhonatan Restrepo	4:06.758	Q
2	Argentina	Mauro Agostini; Walter Pérez; Maximiliano Richeze; Juan Merlos	4:07.092	Q
3	Canada	Adam Jamieson; Eric Johnstone; Sean MacKinnon; Rémi Pelletier-Roy	4:07.656	Q
4	Venezuela	Manuel Briceño Barreto; Victor Moreno Cevilla; Jhoan Paez Camacho; Yosvangs Rojas	4:09.450	Q
5	Chile	Antonio Cabrera; Gonzalo Miranda; Pablo Seisdedos; Luis Fernando Sepúlveda	4:17.068	Q
6	Brazil	Cristian Egidio da Rosa; Endrigo Pereira; Thiago Nardin; Reis da Costa Camargo Filho	4:18.149	Q
7	Mexico	José Aguirre; Ignacio Sarabia; Diego Yepez; Jose Ulloa	4:18.244	Q

=== First Round ===
Rank	Heat	Nation	Name	Time	Notes
1	4	Colombia	Juan Esteban Arango; Arles Castro; Fernando Gaviria; Jhonatan Restrepo	4:04.877	Q
2	3	Argentina	Mauro Agostini; Walter Pérez; Maximiliano Richeze; Adrián Richeze	4:08.084	Q
3	4	Venezuela	Manuel Briceño Barreto; Victor Moreno Cevilla; Jhoan Paez Camacho; Yosvangs Rojas	4:09.458	
4	3	Canada	Adam Jamieson; Eric Johnstone; Sean MacKinnon; Rémi Pelletier-Roy	4:11.731	
5	1	Brazil	Cristian Egidio da Rosa; Endrigo Pereira; Thiago Nardin; Gideoni Monteiro	4:12.324	
6	2	Chile	Antonio Cabrera; Gonzalo Miranda; Pablo Seisdedos; Luis Fernando Sepúlveda	4:13.793	
7	1	Mexico	José Aguirre; Ignacio Sarabia; Diego Yepez; Jose Ulloa	4:17.318	

=== Finals ===
Rank	Heat	Nation	Name	Time	Notes
1st place, gold medalist(s)	For Gold	Colombia	Juan Esteban Arango; Arles Castro; Fernando Gaviria; Jhonatan Restrepo	4:03.310	
2nd place, silver medalist(s)	For Gold	Argentina	Mauro Agostini; Maximiliano Richeze; Juan Merlos; Adrián Richeze	4:05.429	
3rd place, bronze medalist(s)	For Bronze	Canada	Eric Johnstone; Sean MacKinnon; Rémi Pelletier-Roy; Edward Veal	4:06.005	
4	For Bronze	Venezuela	Manuel Briceño Barreto; Victor Moreno Cevilla; Jhoan Paez Camacho; Yosvangs Rojas	4:07.777	
5	For 5–6	Brazil	Cristian Egidio da Rosa; Endrigo Pereira; Thiago Nardin; Reis da Costa Camargo Filho		
6	For 5–6	Chile	Antonio Cabrera; Gonzalo Miranda; Pablo Seisdedos; Luis Fernando Sepúlveda	DNS	
7	For 7–8	Mexico	José Aguirre; Ignacio Sarabia; Diego Yepez; Jose Ulloa	DNS	
