= Cycling at the 2019 Pan American Games – Men's team pursuit =

Men's team pursuit at the 2019 Pan American Games
- Venue: Velodrome
- Dates: August 3
- Competitors: 25 from 6 nations
- Winning time: 4:00.772

Medalists
Gold medal	Adrian Hegyvary; Gavin Hoover; John Croom; Ashton Lambie	United States
Silver medal	Marvin Angarita; Jordan Parra; Brayan Sánchez; Juan Esteban Arango; Bryan Gómez	Colombia
Bronze medal	Antonio Cabrera; Felipe Peñaloza; José Luis Rodríguez Aguilar; Pablo Seisdedos	Chile

The men's team pursuit competition of the cycling events at the 2019 Pan American Games was held on August 3 at the Velodrome.

== Records ==
Prior to this competition, the existing world and Games records were as follows:

World record	Australia	3:48.012	Pruszków, Poland	28 February 2019
Games record	Colombia	3:59.236	Guadalajara, Mexico	17 October 2011

== Schedule ==
Date	Time	Round
August 3, 2019	11:24	Qualification
August 3, 2019	18:30	Finals

== Results ==
=== Qualification ===
Fastest 2 teams race for the gold and silver medals and 3rd and 4th teams race for the bronze medal.

Rank	Nation	Name	Time	Notes
1	United States	John Croom; Adrian Hegyvary; Gavin Hoover; Ashton Lambie	4:03.796	QG
2	Colombia	Juan Esteban Arango; Bryan Gómez; Jordan Parra; Brayan Sánchez	4:07.153	QG
3	Chile	Felipe Peñaloza; José Luis Rodríguez Aguilar; Antonio Cabrera; Pablo Seisdedos	4:07.393	QB
4	Mexico	Ignacio Prado; José Aguirre; Edibaldo Maldonado; Ignacio Sarabia	4:11.384	QB
5	Peru	Alonso Gamero; André Gonzales; Hugo Ruíz; Alain Quispe	4:14.415	
6	Trinidad and Tobago	Tyler Cole; Jovian Gomez; Kemp Orosco; Jabari Whiteman	4:24.216	

=== Finals ===
The final classification is determined in the medal finals.

Rank	Nation	Name	Time	Notes
Gold medal final
1st place, gold medalist(s)	United States	Adrian Hegyvary; Gavin Hoover; John Croom; Ashton Lambie	4:00.772	
2nd place, silver medalist(s)	Colombia	Marvin Angarita; Jordan Parra; Brayan Sánchez; Juan Esteban Arango	4:05.098	
Bronze medal final
3rd place, bronze medalist(s)	Chile	Antonio Cabrera; Felipe Peñaloza; José Luis Rodríguez Aguilar; Pablo Seisdedos	4:03.970	
4	Mexico	Ignacio Prado; José Aguirre; Edibaldo Maldonado; Ignacio Sarabia	4:11.634	
