= Cycling at the 2019 Pan American Games – Men's omnium =

Men's omnium at the 2019 Pan American Games
- Venue: Velodrome
- Dates: August 1
- Competitors: 14 from 14 nations
- Winning points: 181

Medalists
Gold medal	Daniel Holloway	United States
Silver medal	Ignacio Prado	Mexico
Bronze medal	Felipe Peñaloza	Chile

The men's omnium competition of the cycling events at the 2019 Pan American Games was held on August 1 at the Velodrome.

== Schedule ==
Date	Time	Round
August 1, 2019	12:08	Scratch
August 1, 2019	13:00	Tempo Race
August 1, 2019	18:05	Elimination
August 1, 2019	19:27	Points Race

== Results ==
=== Scratch ===
The race was started at 12:08.

Rank	Name	Nation	Laps down	Event points
1	Ignacio Prado	Mexico		40
2	Felipe Peñaloza	Chile	−1	38
3	Daniel Holloway	United States	−1	36
4	Juan Esteban Arango	Colombia	−1	34
5	Tomás Contte	Argentina	−1	32
6	Yans Arias	Cuba	−1	30
7	Alonso Gamero	Peru	−1	28
8	Ángel Pulgar	Venezuela	−1	26
9	Akil Campbell	Trinidad and Tobago	−1	24
10	Dorian Monterroso	Guatemala	−1	22
11	Carlos Quishpe	Ecuador	−1	20
12	Hillard Cijntje	Aruba	−1	18
13	Pablo Anchieri	Uruguay	−1	16
14	Junior Marte	Dominican Republic	−2	14

=== Tempo Race ===
The race was started at 13:08.

Rank	Name	Nation	Lap points	Total points	Event points
1	Daniel Holloway	United States	20	26	40
2	Felipe Peñaloza	Chile	20	24	38
3	Juan Esteban Arango	Colombia	20	24	36
4	Ángel Pulgar	Venezuela		10	34
5	Ignacio Prado	Mexico		7	32
6	Akil Campbell	Trinidad and Tobago		5	30
7	Alonso Gamero	Peru		0	28
8	Carlos Quishpe	Ecuador		0	26
9	Yans Arias	Cuba		0	24
10	Tomás Contte	Argentina		0	22
11	Dorian Monterroso	Guatemala		0	20
12	Pablo Anchieri	Uruguay	−20	−20	18
13	Junior Marte	Dominican Republic	−20	−20	16
14	Hillard Cijntje	Aruba	−20	−20	14

=== Elimination ===
The race was started at 18:05.

Rank	Name	Nation	Event points
1	Felipe Peñaloza	Chile	40
2	Daniel Holloway	United States	38
3	Ignacio Prado	Mexico	36
4	Juan Esteban Arango	Colombia	34
5	Alonso Gamero	Peru	32
6	Tomás Contte	Argentina	30
7	Yans Arias	Cuba	28
8	Carlos Quishpe	Ecuador	26
9	Akil Campbell	Trinidad and Tobago	24
10	Hillard Cijntje	Aruba	22
11	Ángel Pulgar	Venezuela	20
12	Dorian Monterroso	Guatemala	18
13	Pablo Anchieri	Uruguay	16
14	Junior Marte	Dominican Republic	14

=== Points Race ===
The race was started at 19:27.

Rank	Name	Nation	Lap points	Event points
1	Daniel Holloway	United States	40	67
2	Ignacio Prado	Mexico	40	60
3	Felipe Peñaloza	Chile	20	50
4	Alonso Gamero	Peru	20	33
5	Juan Esteban Arango	Colombia	20	29
6	Ángel Pulgar	Venezuela	20	20
7	Akil Campbell	Trinidad and Tobago	20	20
8	Dorian Monterroso	Guatemala		9
9	Carlos Quishpe	Ecuador		5
10	Tomás Contte	Argentina		3
11	Yans Arias	Cuba		3
DNF	Hillard Cijntje	Aruba	−40	−40
DNF	Pablo Anchieri	Uruguay	−60	−60
DNF	Junior Marte	Dominican Republic		2

=== Final standings ===
The final classification is determined overall standings.

Rank	Name	Nation	Scratch	Tempo	Elimination	Points Race	Total
1st place, gold medalist(s)	Daniel Holloway	United States	36	40	38	67	181
2nd place, silver medalist(s)	Ignacio Prado	Mexico	40	32	36	60	168
3rd place, bronze medalist(s)	Felipe Peñaloza	Chile	38	38	40	50	166
4	Juan Esteban Arango	Colombia	34	36	34	29	133
5	Alonso Gamero	Peru	28	28	32	33	121
6	Ángel Pulgar	Venezuela	26	34	20	20	100
7	Akil Campbell	Trinidad and Tobago	24	30	24	20	98
8	Tomás Contte	Argentina	32	22	30	3	87
9	Yans Arias	Cuba	30	24	28	3	85
10	Carlos Quishpe	Ecuador	20	26	26	5	77
11	Dorian Monterroso	Guatemala	22	20	18	9	69
12	Junior Marte	Dominican Republic	14	16	14	2	46
13	Hillard Cijntje	Aruba	18	14	22	−40	14
14	Pablo Anchieri	Uruguay	16	18	16	−60	−10
