= 2013 Pan American Track Cycling Championships =

- Venue: Mexico City, Mexico
- Date: February 6–10, 2013
- Velodrome: CNAR Velodrome
- Events: 19

The 2013 Pan American Track Cycling Championships took place at the CNAR Velodrome, Mexico City, Mexico on February 6–10, 2013.

== Medal summary ==
=== Men ===
Event	Gold	Silver	Bronze
Sprint	Hersony Canelón; Venezuela	Joseph Veloce; Canada	Santiago Ramírez; Colombia
1 km time trial	Fabián Puerta; Colombia	Ángel Pulgar; Venezuela	Anderson Parra; Colombia
Keirin	Fabián Puerta; Colombia	Santiago Ramírez; Colombia	Leandro Bottasso; Argentina
Scratch	Maximiliano Richeze; Argentina	Jan Carlos Arias; Cuba	Máximo Rojas; Venezuela
Points race	Máximo Rojas; Venezuela	Jan Carlos Arias; Cuba	Manuel Rodas; Guatemala
Individual pursuit	Eduardo Sepúlveda; Argentina	Mauro Agostini; Argentina	Jhonatan Restrepo; Venezuela
Omnium	Fernando Gaviria; Colombia	José Alfredo Aguirre; Mexico	Pablo Seisdedos; Chile
Madison	Mexico; Diego Yépez; José Infante	Argentina; Walter Pérez; Eduardo Sepúlveda	Cuba; Jan Carlos Arias; Ramon Martin
Team sprint	Venezuela; César Marcano; Hersony Canelón; Ángel Pulgar	Canada; Joseph Veloce; Stéphane Cossette; Hugo Barrette	United States; Nathan Koch; Kevin Mansker; Matthew Baranoski
Team pursuit	Argentina; Walter Pérez; Maximiliano Richeze; Mauro Richeze; Eduardo Sepúlveda	Colombia; Fernando Gaviria; Jhonatan Restrepo; Jordan Parra; Juan Sebastián Molano	Mexico; José Alfredo Aguirre; Edibaldo Maldonado; José Infante; Diego Yépez

=== Women ===
Event	Gold	Silver	Bronze
Sprint	Lisandra Guerra; Cuba	Juliana Gaviria; Colombia	Gleydimar Tapia; Venezuela
500 m time trial	Lisandra Guerra; Cuba	Juliana Gaviria; Colombia	Madalyn Godby; United States
Keirin	Lisandra Guerra; Cuba	Juliana Gaviria; Colombia	Mariaesthela Vilera; Venezuela
Individual pursuit	Marlies Mejías; Cuba	Yudelmis Domínguez; Cuba	Elizabeth Newell; United States
Points race	Yudelmis Domínguez; Cuba	María Luisa Calle; Colombia	Danielys García; Venezuela
Scratch	Elizabeth Newell; United States	Milena Salcedo; Colombia	Yudelmis Domínguez; Cuba
Omnium	Marlies Mejías; Cuba	Angie González; Venezuela	Elizabeth Newell; United States
Team sprint	Colombia; Juliana Gaviria; Martha Bayona	Cuba; Lisandra Guerra; Laura Arias	Venezuela; Marynés Prada; Gleydimar Tapia
Team pursuit	Cuba; Yudelmis Domínguez; Marlies Mejías; Arlenis Sierra	Colombia; María Luisa Calle; Sérika Gulumá; Milena Salcedo	Venezuela; Jennifer Cesar; Angie González; Danielys García

== Records ==
Pan American records were set in the following events:

- Men's sprint (flying 200m time trial/qualifying round): 9"709 by Hersony Canelón
- Men's 1 km time trial: 1'00"349 by Fabián Puerta
- Men's individual pursuit (qualifying round): 4'15"279 by Eduardo Sepúlveda
- Men's team sprint (qualifying round): 43"031 by Venezuela (César Marcano, Hersony Canelón and Ángel Pulgar)
- Women's sprint (flying 200m time trial/qualifying round): 10"744 by Lisandra Guerra
- Women's 500m time trial: 33"272 by Lisandra Guerra

== Medal table ==
Rank	Nation	Gold	Silver	Bronze	Total
1	Cuba (CUB)	7	4	2	13
2	Colombia (COL)	4	8	2	14
3	Venezuela (VEN)	3	2	7	12
4	Argentina (ARG)	3	2	1	6
5	Mexico (MEX)	1	1	1	3
6	United States (USA)	1	0	4	5
7	Canada (CAN)	0	2	0	2
8	Chile (CHI)	0	0	1	1
8	Guatemala (GUA)	0	0	1	1
Totals (9 entries)		19	19	19	57
