= Cycling at the 2022 Bolivarian Games =

Cycling competitions at the 2022 Bolivarian Games

- Cycling pictograms
- Venue: Lote Villa Dariana (BMX); Cerro Santo Ecce Homo (mountain biking); Vías Públicas Departamentales (road); Velódromo Alcides Nieto Patiño (track)
- Dates: 24 June – 2 July 2022
- Competitors: 191 from 10 nations

Champions
- Colombia (17 gold, 9 silver, 2 bronze)

Cycling competitions at the 2022 Bolivarian Games in Valledupar, Colombia were held from 24 June to 2 July 2022 at three venues across Valledupar and at one sub-venue in Cali.

Twenty medal events were scheduled to be contested in the four disciplines of BMX, mountain biking, road cycling and track cycling. In each discipline there were the same events for both men and women. A total of 191 cyclists competed in the events. The events were open competitions without age restrictions.

Colombia, who were the competition defending champions after Santa Marta 2017, won the cycling competitions again after winning 17 of the 20 gold medals at stake.

== Participating nations ==
A total of 10 nations (all the 7 ODEBO nations and 3 invited) registered athletes for the cycling competitions. Each nation was able to enter a maximum of 54 athletes (27 per gender) distributed by disciplines as follows:

- BMX: 4 athletes (2 per gender)
- Mountain biking: 4 athletes (2 per gender)
- Road cycling: 16 athletes (8 per gender)
- Track cycling: 30 athletes (15 per gender)

Only Guatemala did not register participants.

- Bolivia (11 athletes)
- Chile (32)
- Colombia (35)
- Ecuador (19)
- El Salvador (2)
- Dominican Republic (8)
- Panama (7)
- Paraguay (20)
- Peru (17)
- Venezuela (40)

== Venues ==
BMX, mountain biking and road cycling were held in Valledupar, while track cycling competitions took place in Cali, a sub-venue outside Valledupar.

| Venue | City | Sport | Date | Medal events | Capacity |
|---|---|---|---|---|---|
| Vías Públicas Departamentales | Valledupar | Road cycling | 24 and 26 June | 4 | |
| Cerro Santo Ecce-Homo | Valledupar | Mountain biking | 30 June | 2 | |
| Velódromo Alcides Nieto Patiño | Cali | Track cycling | 30 June – 3 July | 12 | 7,650 |
| Lote Villa Dariana BMX traks | Valledupar | BMX racing | 1 July | 2 | |

== Medal summary ==
=== BMX ===
| Event | Gold | Silver | Bronze |
|---|---|---|---|
| Men's racing | Diego Arboleda; Colombia | Jholman Sivira; Venezuela | Hernan Godoy; Chile |
| Women's racing | Mariana Pajón; Colombia | Doménica Azuero; Ecuador | Doménica Mora; Ecuador |

=== Mountain biking ===
| Event | Gold | Silver | Bronze |
|---|---|---|---|
| Men's cross-country | Sebastián Miranda; Chile | Nelson Peña; Colombia | Fabio Castañeda; Colombia |
| Women's cross-country | María José Salamanca; Colombia | Yngrid Porras; Venezuela | Michela Molina; Ecuador |

=== Road cycling ===
| Event | Gold | Silver | Bronze |
|---|---|---|---|
| Men's time trial | Walter Vargas; Colombia | Rodrigo Contreras; Colombia | Christofer Jurado; Panama |
| Women's time trial | Miryam Núñez; Ecuador | Sérika Gulumá; Colombia | Lilibeth Chacón; Venezuela |
| Men's road race | Aldemar Reyes; Colombia | Rodrigo Contreras; Colombia | Jefferson Alveiro Cepeda; Ecuador |
| Women's road race | Aranza Villalón; Chile | Miryam Núñez; Ecuador | Ana Sanabria; Colombia |

=== Track cycling ===
| Event | Gold | Silver | Bronze |
|---|---|---|---|
| Men's team pursuit | Colombia (COL); Juan Esteban Arango; Juan Pablo Zapata; Jordan Parra; Julián Osorio | Chile (CHI); Alejandro Soto; Jacob Decar Zúñiga; Antonio Cabrera; Matías Arriagada | Venezuela (VEN); Ángel Pulgar; Leangel Linarez; Jhonny Araujo; Orluis Aular |
| Women's team pursuit | Colombia (COL); Jennifer Sánchez; Lina Rojas; Mariana Herrera; Camila Valbuena | Venezuela (VEN); Angie González; Angy Luna; Verónica Abreu; Wilmarys Moreno | Chile (CHI); Paola Muñoz; Daniela Guajardo; Paula Villalón; Scarlet Cortés |
| Men's individual sprint | Kevin Quintero; Colombia | Santiago Ramírez; Colombia | Adamil Agüero; Venezuela |
| Women's individual sprint | Martha Bayona; Colombia | Marianis Salazar; Colombia | Daniela Colilef; Chile |
| Men's team sprint | Colombia (COL); Santiago Ramírez; Juan Ochoa; Cristian Ortega; Kevin Quintero | Venezuela (VEN); Yorber Teran; Hersony Canelón; Adamil Agüero | Ecuador (ECU); Cristian Gutiérrez; Francisco Bone; Allan Lozano |
| Women's team sprint | Colombia (COL); Juliana Gaviria; Marianis Salazar; Martha Bayona | Chile (CHI); Paola Molina; Renata Urrutia; Daniela Colilef | Venezuela (VEN); Jaly Rodríguez; Elianta De Los Ángeles Soteran; Montserrat Martinez |
| Men's keirin | Kevin Quintero; Colombia | Santiago Ramírez; Colombia | Vicente Ramírez; Chile |
| Women's keirin | Martha Bayona; Colombia | Juliana Gaviria; Colombia | Renata Urrutia; Chile |
| Men's omnium | Juan Esteban Arango; Colombia | Felipe Peñaloza; Chile | Cristian Arriagada; Chile |
| Women's omnium | Mariana Herrera; Colombia | Lina Rojas; Colombia | Dayana Aguilar; Ecuador |
| Men's madison | Colombia (COL); Juan Esteban Arango; Jordan Parra | Venezuela (VEN); Máximo Rojas; Ángel Pulgar | Chile (CHI); Felipe Peñaloza; Antonio Cabrera |
| Women's madison | Colombia (COL); Mariana Herrera; Jennifer Sánchez | Venezuela (VEN); Verónica Abreu; Angie González | Chile (CHI); Scarlet Cortés; Paola Muñoz |

== Medal table ==
* Host nation (Colombia)

| Rank | Nation | Gold | Silver | Bronze | Total |
|---|---|---|---|---|---|
| 1 | Colombia (COL)* | 17 | 9 | 2 | 28 |
| 2 | Chile (CHI) | 2 | 3 | 8 | 13 |
| 3 | Ecuador (ECU) | 1 | 2 | 5 | 8 |
| 4 | Venezuela (VEN) | 0 | 6 | 4 | 10 |
| 5 | Panama (PAN) | 0 | 0 | 1 | 1 |
| Totals (5 entries) | | 20 | 20 | 20 | 60 |

Source: Bolivarianos Valledupar 2022 – BMX medals, Mountain biking medals, Road cycling medals, Track cycling medals
