= Gavin Hoover =

American cyclist

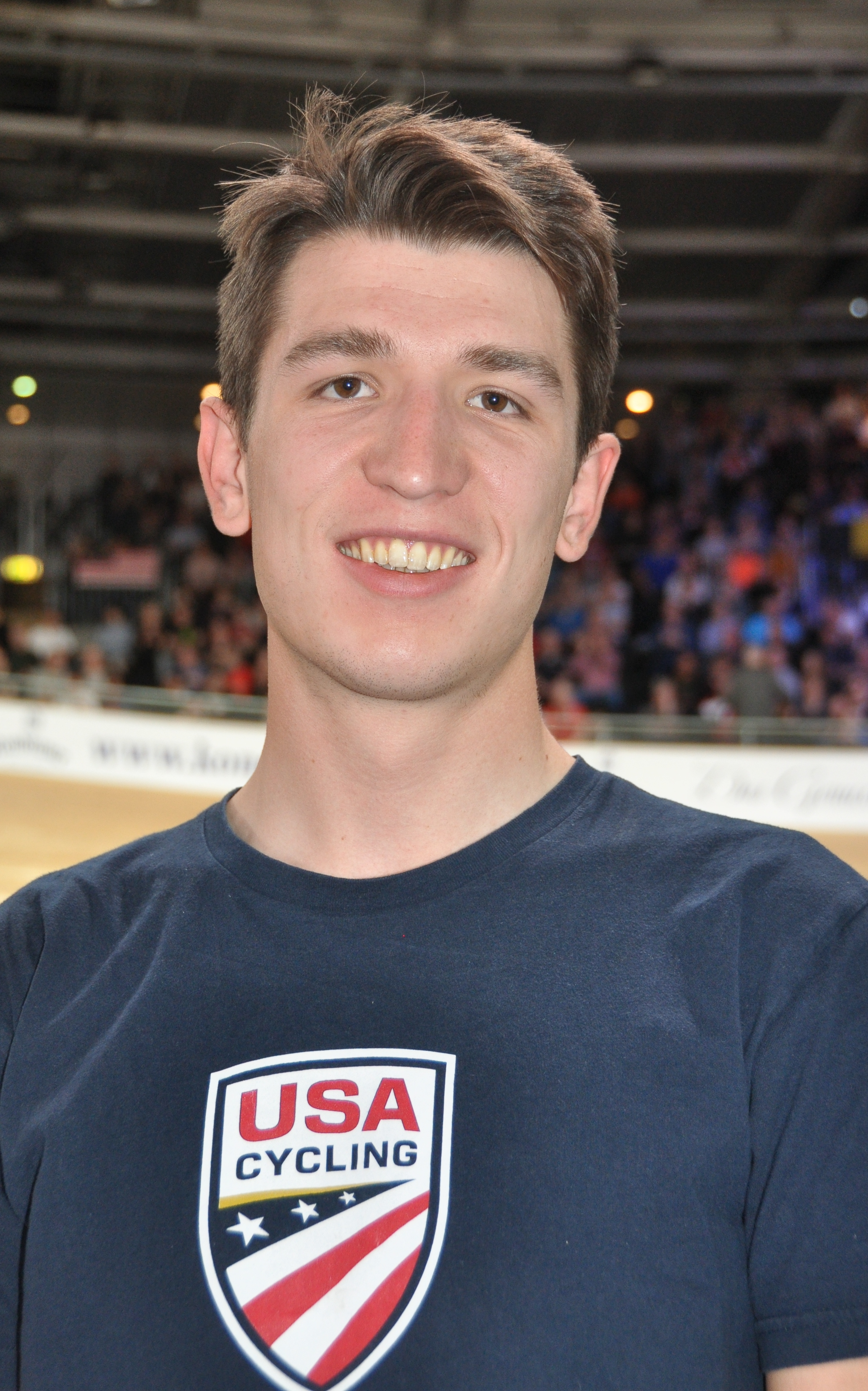
- Hoover at the 2020 UCI Track Cycling World Championships

Personal information
- Full name: Gavin Hoover
- Born: July 12, 1997 (age 29) New York City, New York, United States
- Height: 1.88 m (6 ft 2 in)
- Weight: 170 lb (77 kg)

Cycling career
- Sport: Cycling
- Disciplines: Track; Road
- Role: Rider
- Rider type: Pursuitist (track)

Amateur teams
- 2016: VL Technics–Experza–Abutriek
- 2017: iCademy

Professional teams
- 2018–2021: Elevate–KHS Pro Cycling
- 2022–2023: L39ION of Los Angeles
Medal record
Representing the United States
Men's track cycling
Pan American Games
| Gold medal – first place | 2019 Lima | Team pursuit |
| Silver medal – second place | 2019 Lima | Madison |
Pan American Championships
| Gold medal – first place | 2018 Aguascalientes | Team pursuit |
| Silver medal – second place | 2018 Aguascalientes | Individual pursuit |
| Bronze medal – third place | 2019 Cochabamba | Omnium |
| Bronze medal – third place | 2023 San Juan | Team pursuit |

Gavin Hoover (born July 12, 1997) is an American racing cyclist, who last rode for UCI Continental team L39ION of Los Angeles. He rode in the men's team pursuit event at the 2018 and the 2019 UCI Track Cycling World Championships.

In June 2021, he qualified to represent the United States at the 2020 Summer Olympics.

== Major results ==
=== Track ===
2017
National Championships

1st Team pursuit (with Adrian Hegyvary, Daniel Holloway & Daniel Summerhill)
3rd Individual pursuit

UCI World Cup

3rd Team pursuit, Santiago

2018
Pan American Championships

1st Team pursuit (with Ashton Lambie, Colby Lange & Eric Young)
2nd Individual pursuit

National Championships

1st Team pursuit (with Adrian Hegyvary, Ashton Lambie & Shane Kline)
3rd Individual pursuit

2019
Pan American Games

1st Team pursuit (with Ashton Lambie, John Croom & Adrian Hegyvary)
2nd Madison

1st Omnium, National Championships
3rd Omnium, Pan American Championships
2020
UCI World Cup

3rd Omnium, Milton

2021
1st Overall UCI Champions League Endurance

1st Elimination race, London
2nd Elimination race, Palma
3rd Scratch, Panevėžys

2022
UCI Champions League

1st Scratch, London I
2nd Elimination race, Palma

UCI Nations Cup

3rd Omnium, Milton
3rd Elimination race, Milton

2023
3rd Team pursuit, Pan American Championships

=== Road ===
2014
10th Paris–Roubaix Juniors
