= 2012 Pan American Cycling Championships =

- Venue: Mar del Plata, Argentina
- Date: March 3–11, 2012
- Velodrome: Julio Polet Panamerican Velodrome

The 2012 Pan American Cycling Championships took place in Mar del Plata, Argentina on March 3–11, 2012.

== Medal summary ==
=== Road ===
==== Men ====
Event	Gold	Silver	Bronze
Road race	Maximiliano Richeze; Argentina	Mauro Richeze; Argentina	Héctor Aguilar; Uruguay
Time trial	Magno Nazaret; Brazil	Eduardo Sepúlveda; Argentina	Jorge Soto; Uruguay

==== Women ====
Event	Gold	Silver	Bronze
Road race	Yumari González; Cuba	Leah Kirchmann; Canada	Janildes Fernandes; Brazil
Time trial	Amber Neben; United States	Rhae-Christie Shaw; Canada	Clemilda Fernandes; Brazil

=== Track ===
==== Men ====
Event	Gold	Silver	Bronze
Sprint	Njisane Phillip; Trinidad and Tobago	Hersony Canelón; Venezuela	Fabián Puerta; Colombia
1 km time trial	Alexander Quincy; Trinidad and Tobago	Kevin Mansker; United States	Jonathan Matias Gatto; Argentina
Keirin	Fabián Puerta; Colombia	Leandro Bottasso; Argentina	Travis Smith; Canada
Individual pursuit	Gideoni Monteiro; Brazil	Mauro Agostini; Argentina	Carlos Linarez; Venezuela
Scratch	Bobby Lea; United States	Pablo Seisdedos; Chile	Darren Matthews; Barbados
Points race	Edison Bravo; Chile	Fabrizio Von Nacher; Mexico	Juan Gaspari; Argentina
Omnium	Walter Pérez; Argentina	Carlos Linarez; Venezuela	Bobby Lea; United States
Madison	Chile; Antonio Cabrera; Cristopher Mansilla	Brazil; Armando Camargo; Thiago Nardin	Ecuador; Byron Guamá; José Ragonessi
Team sprint	United States; Michael Blatchford; Kevin Mansker; Jimmy Watkins	Canada; Joseph Veloce; Travis Smith; Hugo Barrette	Venezuela; Hersony Canelón; Ángel Pulgar; César Marcano
Team pursuit	Chile; Pablo Seisdedos; Antonio Cabrera; Gonzalo Miranda; Luis Sepúlveda	Brazil; Armando Camargo; Leandro Silva; Thiago Nardin; Gideoni Monteiro	Argentina; Walter Pérez; Marcos Crespo; Mauro Agostini; Maximiliano Almada

==== Women ====
Event	Gold	Silver	Bronze
Sprint	Monique Sullivan; Canada	Lisandra Guerra; Cuba	Daniela Gaxiola; Mexico
500 m time trial	Lisandra Guerra; Cuba	Juliana Gaviria; Colombia	Elisabeth Carlson; United States
Keirin	Monique Sullivan; Canada	Daniela Gaxiola; Mexico	Jennifer Valente; United States
Individual pursuit	María Luisa Calle; Colombia	Marlies Mejías; Cuba	Elizabeth Newell; United States
Scratch	Lilibeth Chacón; Venezuela	Daniela Guajardo; Chile	Jennifer Valente; United States
Points race	Paola Muñoz; Chile	Danielys García; Venezuela	Daniela Guajardo; Chile
Omnium	Marlies Mejías; Cuba	Angie González; Venezuela	Elizabeth Newell; United States
Team sprint	Venezuela; Daniela Larreal; Mariaesthela Vilera	United States; Elisabeth Carlson; Dana Feiss	Colombia; Diana García; Juliana Gaviria
Team pursuit	Canada; Allison Beveridge; Stephanie Roorda; Laura Brown	Venezuela; Angie González; Danielys García; Lilibeth Chacón	United States; Jennifer Valente; Cari Higgins; Elizabeth Newell

== Medal table ==
Rank	Nation	Gold	Silver	Bronze	Total
1	Chile (CHI)	4	2	1	7
2	Canada (CAN)	3	3	1	7
3	United States (USA)	3	2	7	12
4	Cuba (CUB)	3	2	0	5
5	Venezuela (VEN)	2	5	2	9
6	Argentina (ARG)	2	4	3	9
7	Brazil (BRA)	2	2	2	6
8	Colombia (COL)	2	1	2	5
9	Trinidad and Tobago (TRI)	2	0	0	2
10	Mexico (MEX)	0	2	1	3
11	Uruguay (URU)	0	0	2	2
12	Barbados (BAR)	0	0	1	1
12	Ecuador (ECU)	0	0	1	1
Totals (13 entries)		23	23	23	69
