= Jorge Ríos =

Jorge Ríos may refer to:

- Jorge Ríos (footballer) (born 1999), Peruvian footballer
- Jorge Rios (sport shooter) (born 1959), Cuban sport shooter
- Jorge Rios (cyclist) (born 1972), Portuguese cyclist
