= 2007 Vuelta a Peru =

The 2007 Vuelta a Peru was a road cycling race held from 2 to 11 February 2007 in Peru. It was a multiple stage race over a prologue and eight stages with a total of 775.9 kilometres (482.1 miles).

== Men's stage summary ==
Stage	Date	Start	Finish	Distance	Stage Top 3
P	2 February	Cusco	Cusco	2.9 km	(Italy) Paolo Di Vaio (Argentina) Jorge Giacinti (Bolivia) Óscar Soliz
1	3 February	Cusco	Cusco	90 km	(Argentina) Jorge Giacinti (Chile) Francisco Cabrera (Brazil) Tiago Fiorilli
2	4 February	Cusco	Pisac	96 km	(Portugal) Jorge Rios (Argentina) Jorge Giacinti (Brazil) Tiago Fiorilli
3	5 February	Pisac	Ollantaytambo	127 km	(Portugal) Jorge Rios (Argentina) Jorge Giacinti (Brazil) Tiago Fiorilli
4	6 February	Cusco	Sicuani	138 km	(Portugal) Jorge Rios (Argentina) Jorge Giacinti (Peru) Pablo Ortega
5	7 February	Juliaca	Puno	41 km	(Italy) Paolo Di Vaio (Bolivia) Óscar Soliz (Argentina) Jorge Giacinti
6	8 February	Arequipa	Arequipa	75 km	(Italy) Paolo Di Vaio (Argentina) Jorge Giacinti (Peru) Jorge Reynoso
7	9 February	Arequipa	Arequipa	136 km	(Portugal) Jorge Rios (Brazil) Tiago Fiorilli (Argentina) Jorge Giacinti
8	11 February	Lima	Lima	70 km	(Argentina) Jorge Giacinti (Portugal) Jorge Rios (Italy) Paolo Di Vaio

=== Men's top 10 overall ===
Pos	Rider	Time
1	(Argentina) Jorge Giacinti	
2	(Portugal) Jorge Rios	
3	(Italy) Paolo Di Vaio	
4	(Brazil) Tiago Fiorilli	
5	(Bolivia) Óscar Soliz	
6	(Peru) Jorge Reynoso	
7	(Peru) Alberto Vizcarra	
8	(Peru) Omar Humala	
9	(Spain) Javier Velásquez	
10	(Chile) Francisco Cabrera	
