= Cycling at the 2019 Pan American Games – Men's madison =

Men's madison at the 2019 Pan American Games
- Venue: Velodrome
- Dates: August 4
- Competitors: 22 from 11 nations
- Winning points: 88

Medalists
Gold medal	Antonio Cabrera; Felipe Peñaloza	Chile
Silver medal	Gavin Hoover; Adrian Hegyvary	United States
Bronze medal	Juan Esteban Arango; Brayan Sánchez	Colombia

The men's madison competition of the cycling events at the 2019 Pan American Games was held on August 4 at the Velodrome.

== Schedule ==
Date	Time	Round
August 4, 2019	19:05	Final

== Results ==
The final classification is determined in the medal finals.

Rank	Name	Nation	Laps points	Sprint points	Total points
1st place, gold medalist(s)	Antonio Cabrera; Felipe Peñaloza	Chile	20	68	88
2nd place, silver medalist(s)	Gavin Hoover; Adrian Hegyvary	United States	40	45	85
3rd place, bronze medalist(s)	Juan Esteban Arango; Brayan Sánchez	Colombia	20	41	61
4	Ignacio Prado; José Aguirre	Mexico	20	36	56
5	Tomás Contte; Rubén Ramos	Argentina	20	26	45
6	Carlos Quishpe; Byron Guamá	Ecuador		4	4
7	Alejandro Parra; Leandro Marcos	Cuba		2	2
8	Akil Campbell; Tyler Cole	Trinidad and Tobago	–20	7	–13
9	Maximo Rojas; Clever Martinez	Venezuela	–40	3	–37
	Renato Tapia; César Gárate	Peru	–60	0	DNF
	Wellinton Canela; Geovanny García	Dominican Republic	–60	0	DNF
