= Cycling at the 2015 Pan American Games – Men's omnium =

Cycling – Men's omnium at the 2015 Pan American Games
- Venue: Milton Velodrome
- Dates: July 16–17
- Competitors: 11 from 11 nations

Medalists
| Gold medal | Fernando Gaviria | Colombia |
| Silver medal | Ignacio Prado | Mexico |
| Bronze medal | Gideoni Monteiro | Brazil |

The men's omnium competition of the cycling events at the 2015 Pan American Games was held on July 16 and 17 at the Milton Velodrome in Milton, Ontario.

== Schedule ==
All times are Eastern Daylight Time (UTC−4).

| Date | Time | Round |
|---|---|---|
| July 16, 2015 | 12:08 | Scratch |
| July 16, 2015 | 12:54 | Individual Pursuit |
| July 16, 2015 | 19:01 | Elimination |
| July 17, 2015 | 11:24 | 1 km Time Trial |
| July 17, 2015 | 12:19 | Flying Lap |
| July 17, 2015 | 19:40 | Points Race |
| July 17, 2015 | 19:40 | Overall |

== Results ==
=== Scratch ===
| Rank | Name | Nation | Laps Down | Notes |
|---|---|---|---|---|
| 1 | José Ragonessi | Ecuador | | |
| 2 | Gideoni Monteiro | Brazil | -1 | |
| 3 | Mauro Richeze | Argentina | -1 | |
| 4 | Rémi Pelletier-Roy | Canada | -1 | |
| 5 | Enrique Diaz Cedeno | Venezuela | -1 | |
| 6 | Ignacio Prado | Mexico | -1 | |
| 7 | Fernando Gaviria | Colombia | -1 | |
| 8 | Cristopher Mansilla | Chile | -1 | |
| 9 | Varun Maharajh | Trinidad and Tobago | -1 | |
| | Alfredo Ajpacaja Tax | Guatemala | DNF | |
| | Eduardo Colon Ortiz | Puerto Rico | DNF | |

=== Individual Pursuit ===
| Rank | Name | Nation | Time | Notes |
|---|---|---|---|---|
| 1 | Rémi Pelletier-Roy | Canada | 4:25.189 | |
| 2 | Gideoni Monteiro | Brazil | 4:26.931 | |
| 3 | Fernando Gaviria | Colombia | 4:28.097 | |
| 4 | Ignacio Prado | Mexico | 4:28.935 | |
| 5 | Mauro Richeze | Argentina | 4:34.279 | |
| 6 | José Ragonessi | Ecuador | 4:37.811 | |
| 7 | Enrique Diaz Cedeno | Venezuela | 4:39.971 | |
| 8 | Varun Maharajh | Trinidad and Tobago | 4:45.842 | |
| 9 | Cristopher Mansilla | Chile | 4:47.760 | |
| 10 | Alfredo Ajpacaja Tax | Guatemala | 4:53.659 | |
| 11 | Eduardo Colon Ortiz | Puerto Rico | 4:57.454 | |

=== Elimination ===
| Rank | Name | Nation | Notes |
|---|---|---|---|
| 1 | Fernando Gaviria | Colombia | |
| 2 | Gideoni Monteiro | Brazil | |
| 3 | Ignacio Prado | Mexico | |
| 4 | Enrique Diaz Cedeno | Venezuela | |
| 5 | Varun Maharajh | Trinidad and Tobago | |
| 6 | José Ragonessi | Ecuador | |
| 7 | Cristopher Mansilla | Chile | |
| 8 | Mauro Richeze | Argentina | |
| 9 | Rémi Pelletier-Roy | Canada | |
| 10 | Eduardo Colon Ortiz | Puerto Rico | |
| 11 | Alfredo Ajpacaja Tax | Guatemala | |

=== 1 km Time Trial ===
| Rank | Name | Nation | Time | Notes |
|---|---|---|---|---|
| 1 | Fernando Gaviria | Colombia | 1:03.824 | |
| 2 | Mauro Richeze | Argentina | 1:04.882 | |
| 3 | Rémi Pelletier-Roy | Canada | 1:04.910 | |
| 4 | Ignacio Prado | Mexico | 1:05.181 | |
| 5 | Enrique Diaz Cedeno | Venezuela | 1:05.545 | |
| 6 | Cristopher Mansilla | Chile | 1:05.894 | |
| 7 | Gideoni Monteiro | Brazil | 1:06.005 | |
| 8 | Varun Maharajh | Trinidad and Tobago | 1:06.057 | |
| 9 | Eduardo Colon Ortiz | Puerto Rico | 1:08.419 | |
| 10 | José Ragonessi | Ecuador | 1:09.762 | |
| 11 | Alfredo Ajpacaja Tax | Guatemala | 1:10.475 | |

=== Flying Lap ===
| Rank | Name | Nation | Time | Notes |
|---|---|---|---|---|
| 1 | Fernando Gaviria | Colombia | 13.433 | |
| 2 | Rémi Pelletier-Roy | Canada | 13.480 | |
| 3 | Cristopher Mansilla | Chile | 13.644 | |
| 4 | Mauro Richeze | Argentina | 13.687 | |
| 5 | Gideoni Monteiro | Brazil | 13.718 | |
| 6 | Varun Maharajh | Trinidad and Tobago | 13.884 | |
| 7 | Ignacio Prado | Mexico | 13.910 | |
| 8 | Enrique Diaz Cedeno | Venezuela | 13.954 | |
| 9 | Eduardo Colon Ortiz | Puerto Rico | 14.127 | |
| 10 | Alfredo Ajpacaja Tax | Guatemala | 14.804 | |
| 11 | José Ragonessi | Ecuador | 15.115 | |

=== Points Race ===
| Rank | Name | Nation | Points | Notes |
|---|---|---|---|---|
| 1 | Fernando Gaviria | Colombia | 61 | |
| 2 | Ignacio Prado | Mexico | 57 | |
| 3 | Cristopher Mansilla | Chile | 41 | |
| 4 | José Ragonessi | Ecuador | 35 | |
| 5 | Mauro Richeze | Argentina | 35 | |
| 6 | Gideoni Monteiro | Brazil | 27 | |
| 7 | Rémi Pelletier-Roy | Canada | 20 | |
| 8 | Enrique Diaz Cedeno | Venezuela | 20 | |
| 9 | Alfredo Ajpacaja Tax | Guatemala | | |
| 9 | Varun Maharajh | Trinidad and Tobago | | |
| | Eduardo Colon Ortiz | Puerto Rico | DNF | |

=== Final standings ===
| Rank | Name | Nation | Scratch | Pursuit | Elim | Time Trial | Flying Lap | Points | Total | Notes |
|---|---|---|---|---|---|---|---|---|---|---|
| 1st place, gold medalist(s) | Fernando Gaviria | Colombia | 28 | 36 | 40 | 40 | 40 | 61 | 245 | |
| 2nd place, silver medalist(s) | Ignacio Prado | Mexico | 30 | 34 | 36 | 34 | 28 | 57 | 219 | |
| 3rd place, bronze medalist(s) | Gideoni Monteiro | Brazil | 38 | 38 | 38 | 28 | 32 | 27 | 201 | |
| 4 | Mauro Richeze | Argentina | 36 | 32 | 26 | 38 | 34 | 35 | 201 | |
| 5 | Rémi Pelletier-Roy | Canada | 34 | 40 | 24 | 36 | 38 | 20 | 192 | |
| 6 | Cristopher Mansilla | Chile | 26 | 24 | 28 | 30 | 36 | 41 | 185 | |
| 7 | José Ragonessi | Ecuador | 40 | 30 | 30 | 22 | 20 | 35 | 177 | |
| 8 | Enrique Diaz Cedeno | Venezuela | 32 | 28 | 34 | 32 | 26 | 20 | 172 | |
| 9 | Varun Maharajh | Trinidad and Tobago | 24 | 26 | 32 | 26 | 30 | | 138 | |
| 10 | Alfredo Ajpacaja Tax | Guatemala | -40 | 22 | 20 | 20 | 22 | | 44 | |
| 11 | Eduardo Colon Ortiz | Puerto Rico | -40 | 20 | 22 | 24 | 24 | -80 | -30 | |
