= 2011 Pan American Cycling Championships =

- Venue: Medellín, Colombia
- Date: May 1–8, 2011
- Velodrome: Velódromo Martín Emilio Cochise Rodriguez

The 2011 Pan American Cycling Championships took place in Medellín, Colombia on May 1–8, 2011.

== Medal summary ==
=== Road ===
==== Men ====
Event	Gold	Silver	Bronze
Road race	Gregolry Panizo; Brazil	Gonzalo Garrido; Chile	Luis Felipe Laverde; Colombia
Time trial	Leandro Messineo; Argentina	Iván Casas; Colombia	Tomás Gil; Venezuela

==== Women ====
Event	Gold	Silver	Bronze
Road race	Clara Hughes; Canada	Evelyn García; El Salvador	Theresa Cliff-Ryan; United States
Time trial	Clara Hughes; Canada	Evelyn Stevens; United States	Amber Neben; United States

==== Men (under 23) ====
Event	Gold	Silver	Bronze
Road race	Gideoni Monteiro; Brazil	Enzo Moyano; Argentina	Arnold Olavarria; Chile
Time trial	Ramón Carretero; Panama	Daniel Jaramillo; Colombia	Jacob Rathe; United States

=== Track ===
==== Men ====
Event	Gold	Silver	Bronze
Sprint	Hersony Canelón; Venezuela	Jimmy Watkins; United States	Njisane Phillip; Trinidad and Tobago
1 km time trial	Ángel Pulgar; Venezuela	Travis Smith; Canada	Fabián Puerta; Colombia
Keirin	Fabián Puerta; Colombia	Hersony Canelón; Venezuela	Christian Tamayo; Colombia
Individual pursuit	Arles Castro; Colombia	Juan Esteban Arango; Colombia	Gonzalo Miranda; Chile
Scratch	Carlos Urán; Colombia	Cristopher Mansilla; Chile	Ángel Colla; Argentina
Points race	Edwin Ávila; Colombia	Pablo Seisdedos; Chile	Jan Carlos Arias; Cuba
Omnium	Luis Mansilla; Chile	Carlos Linarez; Venezuela	Carlos Urán; Colombia
Madison	Chile; Antonio Cabrera; Cristopher Mansilla	Colombia; Edwin Ávila; Weimar Roldán	Mexico; Diego Yépez; Christian Martínez
Team sprint	Colombia; Christian Tamayo; Fabián Puerta; Jonathan Marín	United States; Dean Tracy; Jimmy Watkins; Michael Blatchford	Venezuela; Ángel Pulgar; Hersony Canelón; César Marcano
Team pursuit	Colombia; Juan Esteban Arango; Edwin Ávila; Arles Castro; Weimar Roldán	Chile; Antonio Cabrera; Luis Mansilla; Luis Sepúlveda; Gonzalo Miranda	Argentina; Eduardo Sepúlveda; Maximiliano Almada; Christian Martínez; Marcos Crespo

==== Women ====
Event	Gold	Silver	Bronze
Sprint	Lisandra Guerra; Cuba	Monique Sullivan; Canada	Daniela Larreal; Venezuela
500 m time trial	Lisandra Guerra; Cuba	Juliana Gaviria; Colombia	Cristin Walker; United States
Keirin	Lisandra Guerra; Cuba	Cristin Walker; United States	Monique Sullivan; Canada
Individual pursuit	María Luisa Calle; Colombia	Yudelmis Domínguez; Cuba	Marlies Mejías; Cuba
Scratch	Yoanka González; Cuba	Lorena Vargas; Colombia	Íngrid Drexel; Mexico
Points race	Lilibeth Chacón; Venezuela	Arlenis Sierra; Cuba	Cari Higgins; United States
Omnium	Marlies Mejías; Cuba	María Luisa Calle; Colombia	Cari Higgins; United States
Team sprint	Colombia; Diana García; Juliana Gaviria	Venezuela; Mariaesthela Vilera; Daniela Larreal	Cuba; Arianna Herrera; Lisandra Guerra
Team pursuit	Cuba; Yoanka González; Yudelmis Domínguez; Marlies Mejías	Venezuela; Angie González; Danielys García; Lilibeth Chacón	Colombia; Sérika Gulumá; Lorena Vargas; Luz Adriana Tovar

== Medal table ==
Rank	Nation	Gold	Silver	Bronze	Total
1	Colombia (COL)	8	7	5	20
2	Cuba (CUB)	6	2	3	11
3	Venezuela (VEN)	3	4	3	10
4	Chile (CHI)	2	4	2	8
5	Canada (CAN)	2	2	1	5
6	Brazil (BRA)	2	0	0	2
7	Argentina (ARG)	1	1	2	4
8	Panama (PAN)	1	0	0	1
9	United States (USA)	0	4	6	10
10	El Salvador (ESA)	0	1	0	1
11	Mexico (MEX)	0	0	2	2
12	Trinidad and Tobago (TRI)	0	0	1	1
Totals (12 entries)		25	25	25	75
