= Jacquelyn Crowell =

American racing cyclist

Personal information
- Full name: Jacquelyn Crowell
- Born: February 16, 1988 United States
- Died: April 25, 2018 (aged 30)

Cycling career
- Sport: Cycling
- Current team: UnitedHealthcare Women’s Team
- Discipline: Road
- Role: Rider

Professional teams
- 2012–2013: Exergy TWENTY12
- 2014–2018: UnitedHealthcare Women’s Team

Jacquelyn Crowell (February 16, 1988 – April 25, 2018) was an American racing cyclist. She was a graduate from the University of Florida with a degree in mechanical engineering. She was diagnosed with a gliosarcoma in October 2013 after a hemorrhage caused temporary paralysis on her right side. She underwent surgery, chemotherapy, and radiation under the supervision of doctors at the Preston Robert Tisch Brain Tumor Center at Duke University. In a speech given in May 2014, she discussed her mindset and prognosis. In the last years of her life, Crowell worked part-time at the Dick Lane Velodrome, where she taught bicycle racing to younger riders. She died on April 25, 2018, at the age of 30 after a five-year battle with cancer.

== Palmares ==
2005
3rd National Junior Time Trial Championship
3rd National Junior Road Race Championship
2006
1st Junior National Time Trial
2008
3rd Tour de Toona Criterium
4th Athens Twilight Criterium
2009
2nd Collegiate National Road Omnium
2nd Collegiate National Road Criterium
3rd Collegiate National Road Race
3rd National U23 Road Race Championship
1st National U23 Time Trial Championship
2011
1st Brady Village Criterium
4th Overall Tour de Bretagne
2012
1st National Track Championship (Team Pursuit), with Cari Higgins & Lauren Tamayo
1st National Track Championship (Points race)
2nd Nature Valley Grand Prix Time Trial
3rd Cascade Cycling Classic Prologue
2013
1st Delray Beach Twilight Criterium
1st Sea Otter Classic GC
2nd Tulsa Tough Stages 1, 2, and Overall
5th USPro Road Race
6th USPro Time Trial
