= Joseph Veloce =

Canadian cyclist

Cycling career
- Sport: Cycling
- Discipline: Track
- Role: Rider
- Rider type: Sprinter
Medal record
Representing Canada
Men's track cycling
Pan American Games
Gold medal – first place	2015 Toronto	Team sprint
Pan American Championships
Silver medal – second place	2009 Mexico City	Team sprint
Silver medal – second place	2012 Mar del Plata	Team sprint
Silver medal – second place	2013 Mexico City	Sprint
Silver medal – second place	2013 Mexico City	Team sprint
Silver medal – second place	2015 Santiago	Team sprint
Bronze medal – third place	2013 Mexico City	Flying lap

Joseph Veloce (born 23 April 1989) is a Canadian cyclist. He was born in St. Catharines, Ontario. He competed in keirin at the 2012 Summer Olympics in London. He also competed in the keirin, the men's sprint and the men's team sprint at the 2014 Commonwealth Games. Joseph Veloce broke the Canadian record for the flying 200 m Time Trial on 9 February 2013 in Mexico City with a time of 9.802 seconds.
