= Ed Veal =

Canadian cyclist

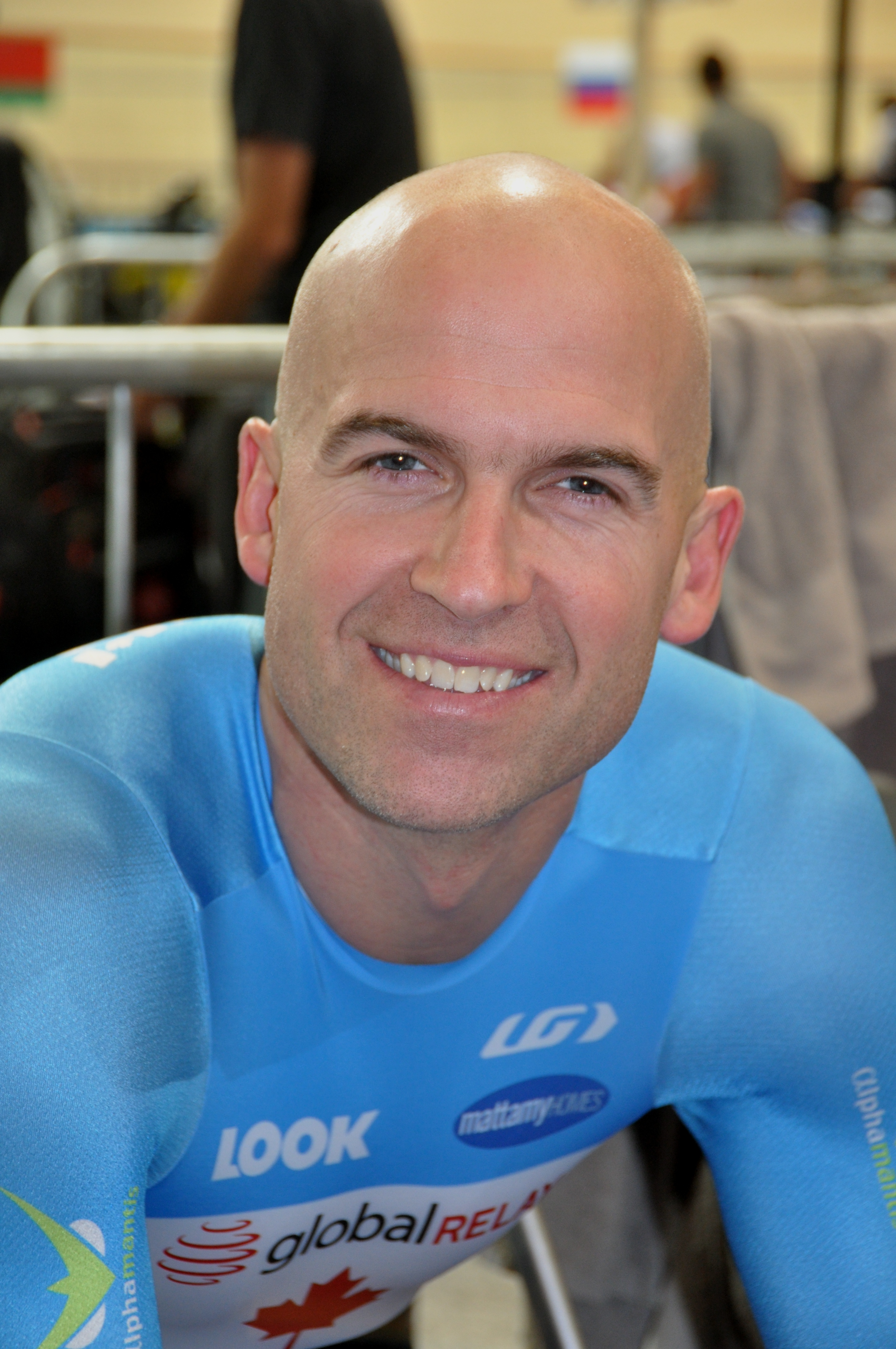
- Ed Veal (2016)

Personal information
- Born: 1 August 1976 (age 50)

Cycling career
- Sport: Cycling
- Role: Rider
Medal record
Representing Canada
Men's track cycling
Pan American Games
Bronze medal – third place	2015 Toronto	Team pursuit
Pan American Championships
Silver medal – second place	2015 Santiago	Team pursuit
Silver medal – second place	2016 Aguascalientes	Team pursuit
Bronze medal – third place	2015 Santiago	Individual pursuit

Ed Veal (born 1 August 1976) is a Canadian racing cyclist. He rode in the men's team pursuit at the 2016 UCI Track Cycling World Championships.
