= Jimmy Watkins (cyclist) =

American track cyclist (born 1982)

Personal information
- Full name: James David Watkins
- Born: August 26, 1982 (age 44) Bakersfield, California, U.S.
- Height: 6 ft 1 in (1.85 m)
- Weight: 96 kg (212 lb; 15.1 st)

Cycling career
- Sport: Cycling
- Discipline: Track
- Role: Rider
- Rider type: Sprinter
Medal record
Men's track cycling
Representing United States
Pan American Games
Silver medal – second place	2011 Guadalajara	Team sprint
Pan American Championships
Gold medal – first place	2009 Mexico City	1km time trial
Gold medal – first place	2012 Mar del Plata	Team sprint
Silver medal – second place	2009 Mexico City	Keirin
Silver medal – second place	2011 Medellin	Sprint
Silver medal – second place	2011 Medellin	Team sprint

James David Watkins (born August 26, 1982) is an American track cyclist. At the 2012 Summer Olympics, he competed in the Men's sprint, where he reached the quarterfinals, and sealed a sixth-place ranking in the final classification race.

== Personal ==
Watkins is a firefighter in his hometown of Bakersfield, California. He is married with a daughter.
