= Cycling at the 2015 Pan American Games – Men's road time trial =

Men's road time trial at the 2015 Pan American Games
- Venue: Milton Time Trial Course
- Dates: July 22
- Competitors: 17 from 13 nations
- Winning time: 45:13.48

Medalists
Gold medal	Hugo Houle	Canada
Silver medal	Ignacio Prado	Mexico
Bronze medal	Sean MacKinnon	Canada

The men's road time trial competition of the cycling events at the 2015 Pan American Games was held on July 22 at the Milton Time Trial Course.

== Schedule ==
All times are Eastern Standard Time (UTC-3).

Date	Time	Round
July 22, 2015	12:35	Final

== Results ==
Rank	Rider	Nation	Time
1st place, gold medalist(s)	Hugo Houle	Canada	45:13.48
2nd place, silver medalist(s)	Ignacio Prado	Mexico	46:31.35
3rd place, bronze medalist(s)	Sean MacKinnon	Canada	46:51.46
4	Murilo Ferraz	Brazil	47:42.79
5	Manuel Rodas	Guatemala	47:48.64
6	Laureano Rosas	Argentina	47:56.52
7	Eric Marcotte	United States	48:07.27
8	Fernando Gaviria	Colombia	48:23.38
9	Alex Cano	Colombia	48:27.71
10	Yonder Godoy	Venezuela	48:41.70
11	Endrigo Da Rosa Pereira	Brazil	49:11.37
12	Segundo Navarrete	Ecuador	49:31.95
13	Alejandro Durán	Argentina	49:43.52
14	André Simon	Antigua and Barbuda	50:59.52
15	Efren Ortega Pivera	Puerto Rico	52:14.62
	Dominique Mayho	Bermuda	DNF
	Emile Abraham	Trinidad and Tobago	DNS
