= Royner Navarro =

Peruvian cyclist

Personal information
- Full name: Royner Grover Navarro Calle
- Born: 1 August 1992 (age 34) Ayacucho, Peru
- Height: 1.71 m (5 ft 7 in)
- Weight: 62 kg (137 lb)

Cycling career
- Sport: Cycling
- Current team: Ciclismo Extremo Peruano
- Discipline: Road
- Role: Rider

Amateur teams
- 2013: Pío Rico
- 2014: World Cycling Centre
- 2015–2016: AC Bisontine
- 2017–2018: Team Inca
- 2019: Team GH Antarkis
- 2021: Team Ediciones Mar Costa
- 2021–: Ciclismo Extremo Peruano

Royner Grover Navarro Calle (born 1 August 1992) is a Peruvian road cyclist, who currently rides for Peruvian amateur team Ciclismo Extremo Peruano. He was selected to compete in the road race at the 2020 Summer Olympics.

== Major results ==
2010
National Junior Road Championships

1st Road race
2nd Time trial

2012
National Under-23 Road Championships

1st Road race
2nd Time trial

2013
National Under-23 Road Championships

1st Road race
3rd Time trial

1st Stage 2 Vuelta a Bolivia
8th Road race, Pan American Under-23 Road Championships
2018
2nd Road race, National Road Championships
South American Games

7th Road race
8th Time trial

2019
1st Overall Vuelta a Perú
4th Road race, Pan American Road Championships
2020
6th Overall Vuelta al Ecuador
