= Peruvian National Road Championships =

Cycling championship in Peru

Peruvian National Road Race Championships – Men's elite race
Race details
- Date: June
- Discipline: Road
- Type: One-day race

History
- First edition: 1999
- First winner: Alan Huachamber
- Most wins: Alonso Gamero (3 Wins)
- Most recent: Royner Navarro

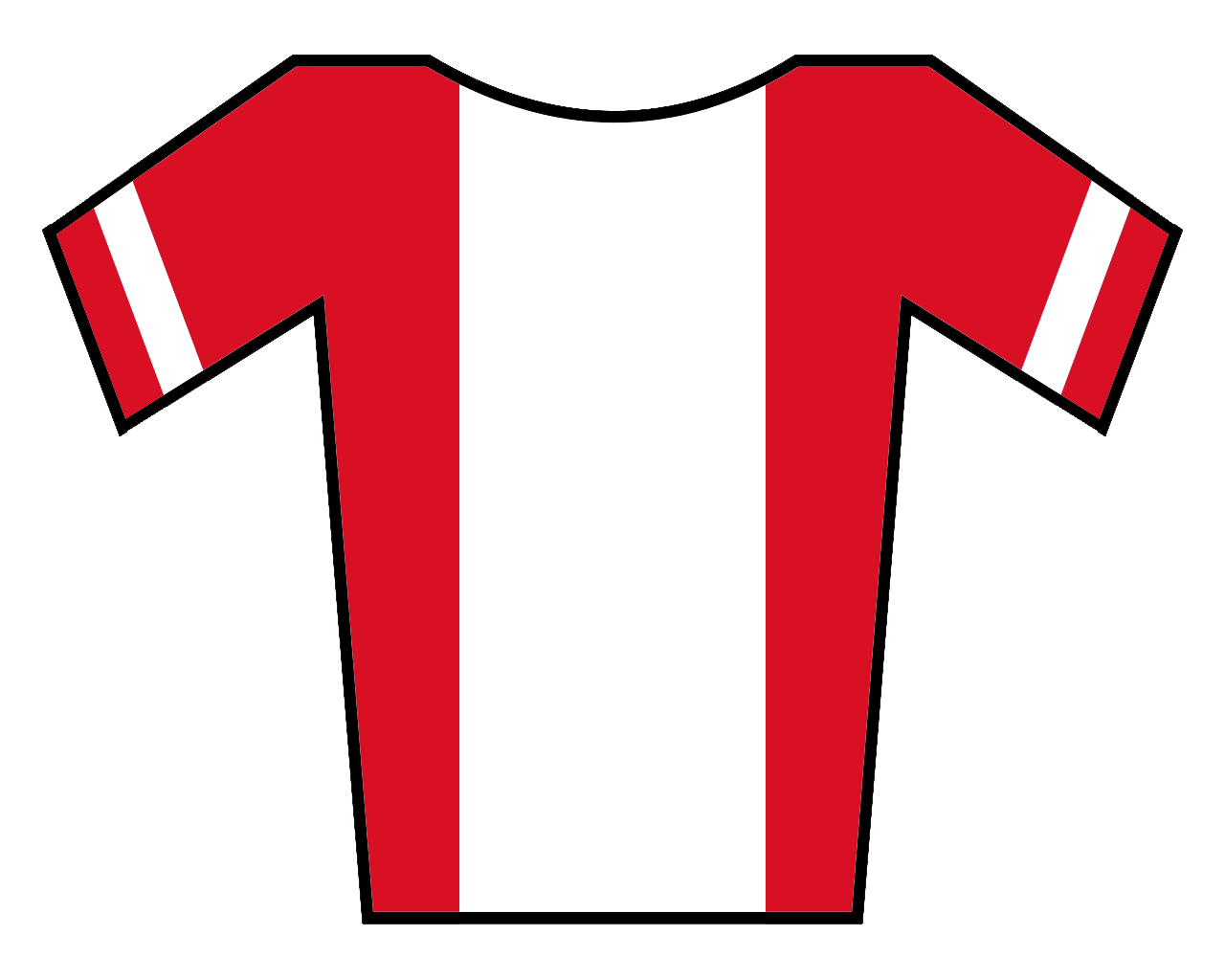
The champion's jersey

The Peruvian National Road Championships are held annually to decide the cycling champions in both the road race and time trial discipline, across various categories.

== Men ==
=== Road race ===
Year	Gold	Silver	Bronze
1999	Alan Huachamber	Jorge Reynoso	Alfredo Mondejar
2000	José Reynoso	Christian Castro	Norman Peña
2001	Cristian Arias	Jimmy Fernández	José Reynoso
2002	José Reynoso	Raul Rodríguez	Gustavo Rios
2003	Marconi Duran	Gustavo Rios	Jorge Reynoso
2005	José Valverde	Gustavo Rios	Jhon Cunto Gonzalez
2006	Leonardo Choque	Fernando Sabogal	Hugo Mochica
2007	Jorge Bustamante	Ever Galindo	José Valverde
2008	Hugo Mochica	Ronald Luza	Erick Zapana
2009	Silvio Ancco	Victor Ancco Rojas	Jhon Cunto Gonzalez
2010	Jorge Quispe	John Cunto Gonzalez	Silvio Ancco
2011	Jesus Nakada	Ever Merino	Ronald Luza
2012	Cesar Mucha	Erik Mendoza	Urbano Ordoñez
2013	Cesar Mucha	Herbert Chavez	Erik Mendoza
2014	Alonso Gamero	Herbert Chavez	Alain Quispe
2015	Alain Quispe	Hugo Ruiz Calle	Aurelian Picart (France)
2016	Cesar Garate	Alvaro Simon	Alonso Gamero
2017	Alonso Gamero	Alain Quispe	Andre Gonzales
2018	Alonso Gamero	Royner Navarro	Andre Gonzales
2019	Royner Navarro	Alain Quispe	Robinson Ruiz

=== Time trial ===
Peruvian National Road Race Championships – Men's elite time trial
Race details
- Discipline: Road
- Type: One-day race

History
- First edition: 1999
- First winner: Alan Huachamber
- Most wins: Alonso Gamero (3 Wins)
- Most recent: Alonso Gamero

Year	Gold	Silver	Bronze
1999	Alan Huachamber	Jorge Reynoso	Alfredo Mondejar
2000	José Reynoso	Christian Castro	Norman Pena
2001	Cristhian Arias	Jimmy Fernández	José Reynoso
2002	José Reynoso	Raúl Rodríguez	Gustavo Ríos
2003	Percy Osco	Gustavo Ríos	Jorge Reynoso
2005	José Valverde	Gustavo Ríos	Jhon Cunto
2006	Leonardo Choque	Fernando Sabogal	Hugo Mochica
2007	Jorge Bustamente	Ever Galindo	José Valverde
2008	Hugo Mochica	Ronal Luza	Erick Zapana
2009	Silvio Ancco	Victor Anco	Jhon Cunto
2010	Jorge Quispe	Jhon Cunto	Silvio Ancco
2011	Jesús Nakada	Ever Merino	Ronald Luza
2012	César Mucha	Erik Mendoza	Urbano Ordóñez
2013	César Mucha	Herbert Chávez	Erick Mendoza
2014	Herbert Chávez	Ronald Luza	Andy Limaylla
2015	Herbert Chávez	Ronald Luza	Alejandro Muñoz
2016	Alonso Gamero	César Mucha	Andy Limaylla
2017	Alonso Gamero	Alain Quispe	Andy Limaylla
2018	Alonso Gamero	Royner Navarro	Alain Quispe
