= Jade Wilcoxson =

American cyclist (born 1978)

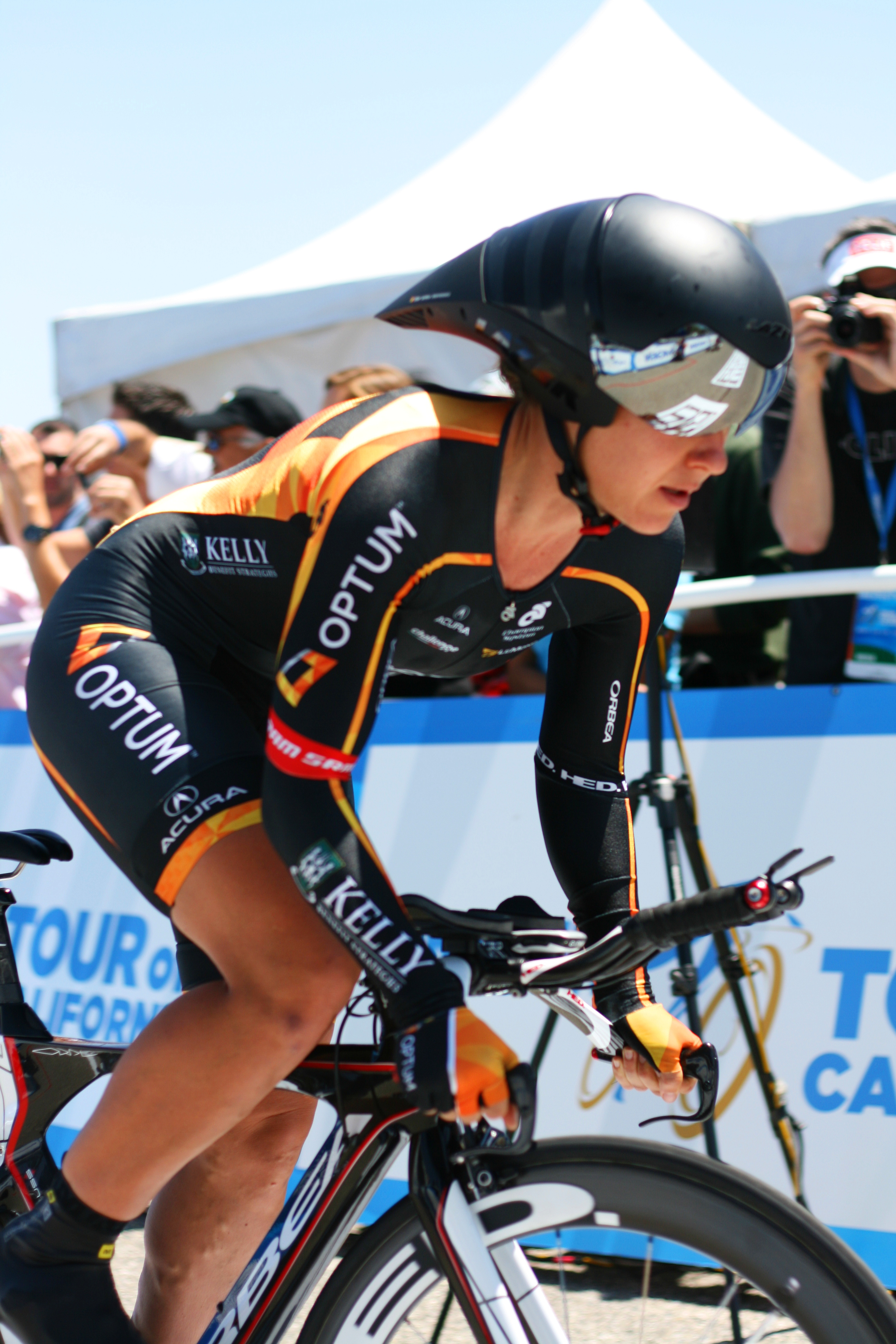
- Wilcoxson at the 2013 Tour of California

Personal information
- Born: April 17, 1978 (age 48) Visalia, California, United States

Cycling career
- Sport: Cycling
- Discipline: Road
- Role: Rider

Professional team
- 2013-2014: Optum–Kelly Benefit Strategies

Jade Wilcoxson (born April 17, 1978) is an American racing cyclist. She competed in the 2013 UCI women's road race in Florence.

== Major results ==
2013
1st National Road Race Championships
5th National Time Trial Championships
3rd Team Pursuit, Los Angeles Grand Prix (with Cari Higgins, Elizabeth Newell and Lauren Tamayo)
2014
5th National Time Trial Championships
