= Felipe Peñaloza =

Chilean cyclist (born 1993)

Personal information
- Full name: Felipe Andrés Peñaloza Yánez
- Born: 24 October 1993 (age 32) Santiago, Chile

Cycling career
- Sport: Cycling
- Current team: CC Chacabuco
- Disciplines: Track; Road
- Role: Rider

Amateur teams
- 2016: Club Augusto Silva Ibaceta
- 2017: Bikemontt–HDS
- 2018–: Club Chacabuco
Medal record
Men's track cycling
Representing Chile
Pan American Games
Gold medal – first place	2019 Lima	Madison
Bronze medal – third place	2019 Lima	Team pursuit
Pan American Championships
Gold medal – first place	2018 Aguascalientes	Points race
Silver medal – second place	2021 Lima	Points race
Bronze medal – third place	2015 Santiago	Team pursuit
Bronze medal – third place	2018 Aguascalientes	Madison
Bronze medal – third place	2021 Lima	Madison
Bolivarian Games
Silver medal – second place	2017 Santa Marta	Omnium
Silver medal – second place	2017 Santa Marta	Team pursuit
Silver medal – second place	2022 Valledupar	Omnium
Bronze medal – third place	2022 Valledupar	Madison
South American Games
Gold medal – first place	2018 Cochabamba	Madison
Silver medal – second place	2018 Cochabamba	Team pursuit
Silver medal – second place	2022 Asuncion	Madison

Felipe Andrés Peñaloza Yánez (born 24 October 1993) is a Chilean track and road cyclist, who currently rides for Chilean amateur team CC Chacabuco.

== Major results ==
=== Track ===
2010
2nd Individual pursuit, Pan American Junior Championships
2011
Pan American Junior Championships

3rd Omnium
3rd Team pursuit

2015
3rd Team pursuit, Pan American Championships
2018
Pan American Championships

1st Points race
3rd Madison (with Antonio Cabrera)

South American Games

1st Madison (with Antonio Cabrera)
2nd Team pursuit

2019
Pan American Games

1st Madison (with Antonio Cabrera)
3rd Team pursuit

2021
Pan American Championships

2nd Points race
3rd Madison (with Antonio Cabrera)

3rd Madison (with Antonio Cabrera), Cali, UCI Nations Cup
2022
Bolivarian Games

2nd Omnium
3rd Madison (with Antonio Cabrera)

2nd Madison (with Cristián Arriagada), South American Games

=== Road ===
2011
2nd Time trial, National Junior Road Championships
2019
1st Road race, National Road Championships
2020
1st Stage 2 Vuelta a Mendoza
1st Stage 3 Vuelta de la Leche
