= Elizabeth Newell Hernandez =

American cyclist

Personal information
- Full name: Elizabeth Newell Hernandez
- Born: 26 March 1982 (age 44)

Cycling career
- Sport: Cycling
- Disciplines: Road and Track cycling
- Role: Rider
- Rider type: points race

Professional teams
- 2012-2013: NOW and Novartis for MS
- 2016: Colavita/Bianchi
Medal record
Women's track cycling
Representing United States
UCI Track Cycling World Cup
Silver medal – second place	2013–14 UCI Track Cycling World Cup	Points race
Pan American Championships
Gold medal – first place	2013 Pan American Track Cycling Championships	Scratch race
Gold medal – first place	2014 Pan American Track Cycling Championships	Team Pursuit
Bronze medal – third place	2012 Pan American Cycling Championships	Individual Pursuit
Bronze medal – third place	2012 Pan American Cycling Championships	Omnium
Bronze medal – third place	2012 Pan American Cycling Championships	Team Pursuit
Bronze medal – third place	2013 Pan American Track Cycling Championships	Individual Pursuit
Bronze medal – third place	2013 Pan American Track Cycling Championships	Omnium

Elizabeth Newell Hernandez (born 26 March 1982) is an American female road and track cyclist. She competed in the points race event at the 2014 UCI Track Cycling World Championships. She is part of the UCI women's team named Colavita/Bianchi.

== Major results ==
2011
1st National Track Championships - Points Race
1st National Track Championships - Omnium
2012
2012 Pan American Cycling Championships

3rd Omnium
3rd Individual Pursuit
3rd Team Pursuit (with Cari Higgins and Jennifer Valente)

2013
Pan American Track Championships

1st Scratch Race
3rd Omnium
3rd Individual Pursuit

2nd Points Race, International Belgian Open
2nd Points Race - Track World Cup I - Manchester
3rd Team Pursuit - Los Angeles Grand Prix (with Cari Higgins, Lauren Tamayo and Jade Wilcoxson)
2014
1st Team Pursuit, Pan American Track Championships (with Amber Gaffney, Kimberly Geist and Jennifer Valente)
1st Points Race - Grand Prix of Colorado Springs
2nd Omnium - Grand Prix of Colorado Springs
2nd Points Race - Fastest Man on Wheels
2nd Points Race - Festival of Speed
2015
1st Individual Pursuit - U.S. Vic Williams Memorial Grand Prix
3rd Points Race - Festival of Speed
