= Vuelta a Perú =

Men's multi-stage road cycling race in Peru

Race details
- Region: Peru
- English name: Tour of Peru
- Local name(s): Vuelta a Perú (in Spanish)
- Discipline: Road
- Type: Stage race

History
- First edition: 2005
- Editions: 12 (as of 2019)
- First winner: Jorge Rios (POR)
- Most recent: Alain Quispe (PER)

The Vuelta a Peru is a road cycling race held in Peru. The race exists of a men's competition over a prologue and eight stages.

== Past winners ==
Year	Winner	Second	Third
2005	(Portugal) Jorge Rios	(Peru) Jorge Bustamante	(Peru) José Valverde
2007	(Argentina) Jorge Giacinti	(Russia) Andrei Sartassov	(Chile) Marco Arriagada
2015	(Peru) César Gárate	(Peru) Alonso Gamero	(Peru) Hugo Ruiz
2016	(Peru) André Gonzales
2017	(Peru) Alain Quispe	(Peru) Alonso Gamero	(Peru) Renado Tapia
2018	(Bolivia) Javier Arando	(Peru) Jhon Fredy Lozada	(Peru) Federico Muñoz
2019	(Peru) Royner Navarro	(Peru) Hugo Ruiz	(Peru) Andy Limaylla
