= Eduardo Sepúlveda =

Argentine cyclist (born 1991)

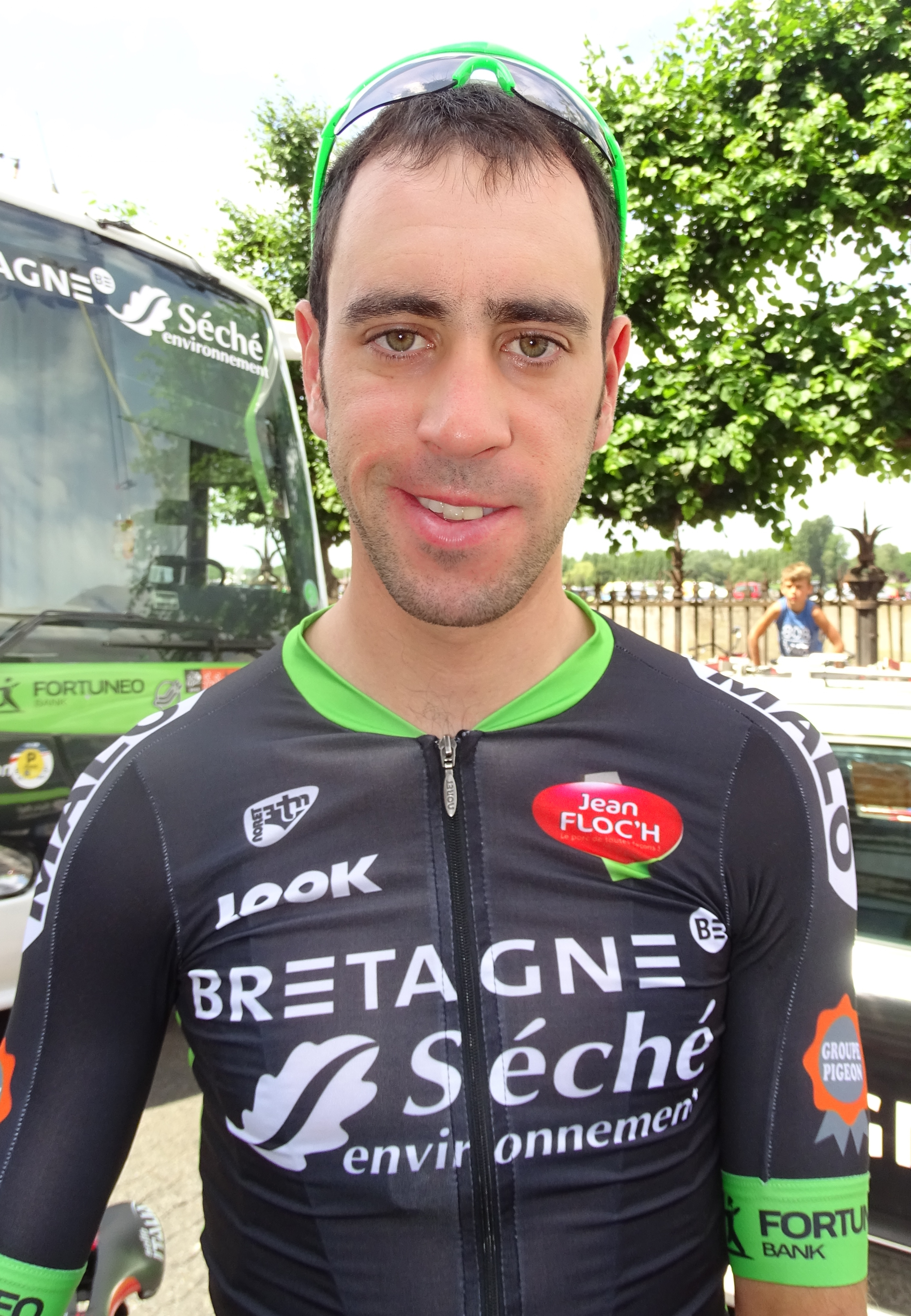
- Sepúlveda in 2015

Personal information
- Born: 13 June 1991 (age 35) Rawson, Chubut, Argentina
- Weight: 62 kg (137 lb)

Cycling career
- Sport: Cycling
- Current team: Li-Ning Star
- Disciplines: Road; Track
- Role: Rider
- Rider type: Climber

Amateur teams
- 2012: World Cycling Centre
- 2012: FDJ–BigMat (stagiaire)

Professional teams
- 2013–2017: Bretagne–Séché Environnement
- 2018–2020: Movistar Team
- 2021–2022: Androni Giocattoli–Sidermec
- 2023–2025: Lotto–Dstny
- 2026–: Li-Ning Star
Medal record
Representing Argentina
Men's track cycling
Pan American Championships
Gold medal – first place	2013 Mexico City	Individual pursuit
Gold medal – first place	2013 Mexico City	Team pursuit
Silver medal – second place	2013 Mexico City	Madison
Bronze medal – third place	2010 Aguascalientes	Individual pursuit
Bronze medal – third place	2011 Medellin	Team pursuit
Men's road bicycle racing
Pan American Games
Silver medal – second place	2023 Santiago	Road race
Pan American Championships
Silver medal – second place	2012 Mar del Plata	Time trial

Eduardo Sepúlveda (born 13 June 1991) is an Argentine racing cyclist, who currently rides for UCI Continental team Li-Ning Star. He rode at the 2014 UCI Road World Championships.

== Early life ==
Sepúlveda was born in Rawson, the capital of Chubut Province, in Argentine Patagonia. He started to ride a bike under the advice of his father, Eduardo. In 2007, aged 16 years old, Sepúlveda won the Copa Nacional Infanto Juvenil for young riders in Argentina. However, his father was killed in a car accident while returning home after the event. Sepúlveda recovered from this and later was selected as one of the best young riders of the country and invited to the CeNARD in Buenos Aires, some 1,400 kilometres (870 miles) away from his home in Rawson.

After a series of good results, in 2012, Sepúlveda was invited for the Union Cycliste Internationale to the World Cycling Centre in Aigle, Switzerland, among many other riders from developing countries, including Natnael Berhane, Youcef Reguigui and Josip Rumac. Also in 2012, he won the silver medal in the individual time trial at the Pan American Road Championships in Mar del Plata, losing out to Magno Nazaret from Brazil.

== Professional career ==
In 2013, Sepúlveda began his career with the French team Bretagne–Séché Environnement and signed an initial two-year contract. In a 2014 interview, Sepúlveda said thanks to the Tour de San Luis for allowing him a chance to train at the World Cycling Centre and to sign with the French second division team Bretagne–Séché Environnement.

Sepúlveda took his first professional win in February 2015 with a solo victory in the Classic Sud-Ardèche. Later that year, he took a fine second place in the overall classification of the Tour of Turkey, 32 seconds down on Kristijan Đurasek (Lampre–Merida). He participated in the 2015 Tour de France, but was disqualified on stage 14 for riding in a car instead of pedaling his bike.

For the 2018 season, Sepúlveda joined one of the UCI WorldTeams, Movistar Team from Spain, and signed a two-year contract, a move predicted for many insiders in the UCI World Tour. In May 2018, he was named in the start list for the Giro d'Italia for the first time in his career.

He was expected to ride the 2019 Vuelta a España but was not selected, and, after this omission, 2019 was the first year in his professional career that Sepúlveda did not ride one Grand Tour. For the 2020 season, Sepúlveda re-signed for one year with the Spanish-based team before moving to Androni Giocattoli–Sidermec for the 2021 season.

In November 2022, Sepúlveda signed with Lotto–Dstny for the 2023 season.

== Major results ==
2010
3rd Individual pursuit, Pan American Track Championships
2011
3rd Team pursuit, Pan American Track Championships
7th Overall Rutas de América
2012
Pan American Road Championships

1st Under-23 time trial
2nd Time trial

2nd ZLM Tour
5th Overall Coupe des nations Ville Saguenay
8th Chrono Champenois
2013
Pan American Track Championships

1st Individual pursuit
1st Team pursuit
2nd Madison

6th Overall Kreiz Breizh Elites
9th Overall Tour du Poitou-Charentes
10th Time trial, UCI Under-23 Road World Championships
10th Circuito de Getxo
2014
4th Overall Tour Méditerranéen

1st Young rider classification

5th Overall Critérium International
6th Overall Tour de San Luis
2015 (2 pro wins)
1st Classic Sud-Ardèche
1st Tour du Doubs
2nd Overall Tour of Turkey
4th Overall Tour de San Luis
5th Overall Route du Sud
2016 (1)
2nd Overall Tour de San Luis

1st Mountains classification
1st Stage 4

4th Tour du Doubs
2017
4th Classic Sud-Ardèche
2019
2nd Overall Tour of Austria
2021
3rd Overall Tour of Turkey
4th Overall Tour of Romania
8th Overall Adriatica Ionica Race
10th Giro dell'Appennino
2022 (1)
3rd Overall Tour of Turkey

1st Stage 4

7th Overall Tour de Langkawi
8th Overall Tour of Antalya
2023 (2)
1st Overall Vuelta a Castilla y León

1st Stage 2

2nd Road race, Pan American Games
7th Overall Sibiu Cycling Tour
Vuelta a España

Held after Stages 4–10

2024
8th Overall Sibiu Cycling Tour
9th Tour du Doubs
2026
1st Oita Urban Classic
1st Dhofar Classic
2nd Overall Tour of Thailand
2nd Overall Tour of Salalah

1st Stage 3

3rd Overall Tour of Antalya
4th Overall Tour of Japan
6th Overall Tour of Mentougou
7th Overall Tour of Magnificent Qinghai

=== Grand Tour general classification results timeline ===
Grand Tour	2015	2016	2017	2018	2019	2020	2021	2022	2023
Giro d'Italia	—	—	—	96	—	57	47	76	—
Tour de France	DSQ	59	66	—	—	—	—	—	—
Vuelta a España	—	—	—	—	—	—	—	—	102

Legend
—	Did not compete
DNF	Did not finish
DSQ	Disqualified
