= Cari Higgins =

American cyclist (born 1976)

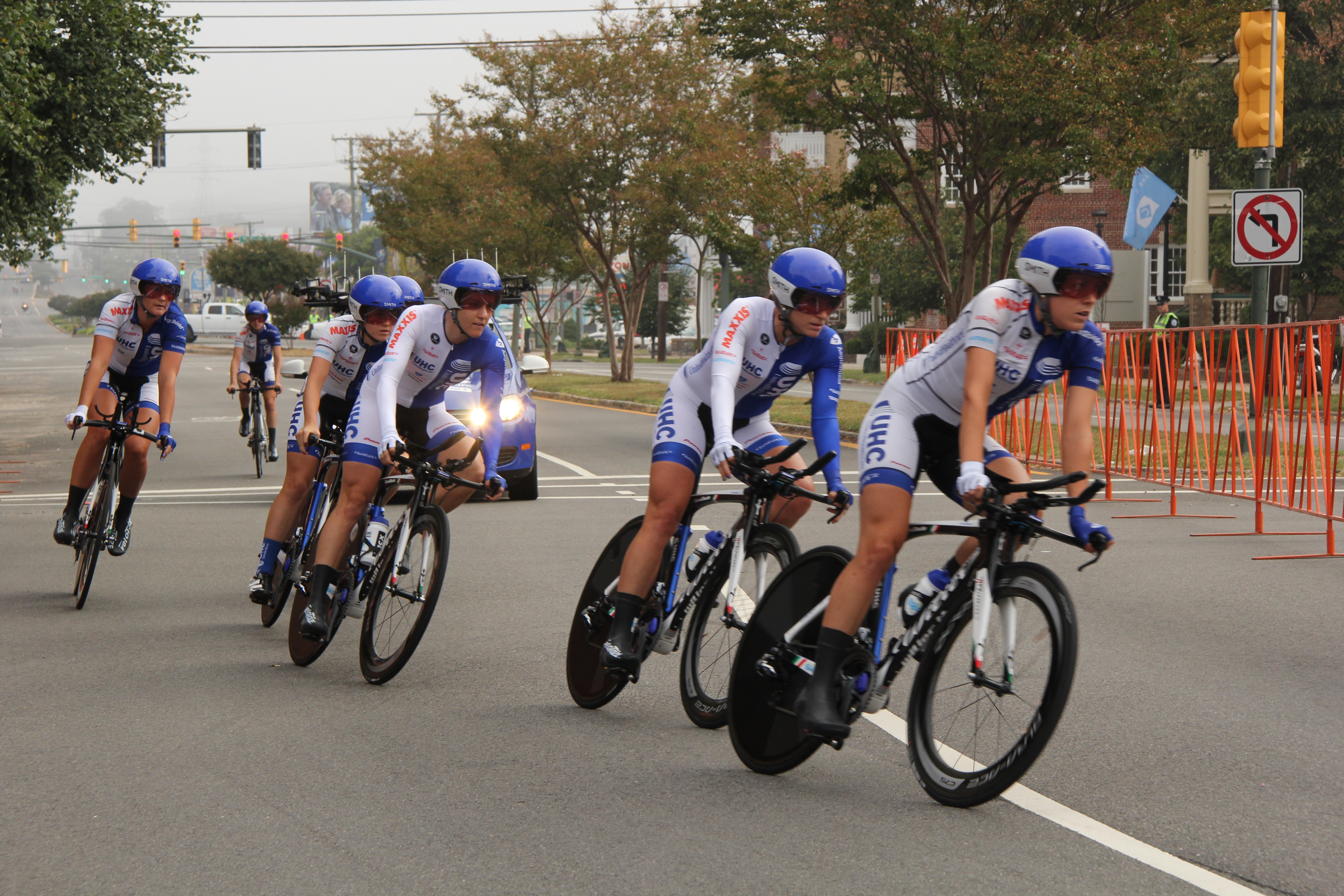
- Riding with UnitedHealthcare at the 2015 UCI Road World Championships

Personal information
- Born: October 5, 1976 (age 50) United States

Cycling career
- Sport: Cycling
- Current team: Retired
- Disciplines: Road; Track
- Role: Rider

Amateur teams
- 2007–2008: Team America's Dairyland
- 2009: Proman Hit Squad
- 2010–2013: Twenty12

Professional team
- 2014–2016: UnitedHealthcare
Medal record
Representing United States
Women's track cycling
Pan American Championships
Silver medal – second place	2009 Mexico City	Scratch
Bronze medal – third place	2009 Mexico City	500m time trial
Bronze medal – third place	2009 Mexico City	Keirin
Bronze medal – third place	2009 Mexico City	Sprint
Bronze medal – third place	2011 Medellin	Omnium
Bronze medal – third place	2011 Medellin	Points race
Bronze medal – third place	2012 Mar del Plata	Team pursuit

Cari Higgins (born October 5, 1976) is an American former racing cyclist. Following her retirement from cycling, Higgins became a real estate agent.

In 2021, Higgins was appointed to USA Cycling's Board of Directors as an Athlete Representative.

== Major results ==
2007
National Track Championships

1st Team sprint (with Liz Reap-Carlson)
3rd 500m time trial

2008
National Track Championships

1st 500m time trial
1st Keirin
1st Sprint
1st Team sprint (with Liz Reap-Carlson)
3rd Individual pursuit

2009
Pan American Track Championships

2nd Scratch
3rd 500m time trial
3rd Keirin
3rd Sprint

2010
1st Stage 2 Tulsa Tough
9th Overall Tour of America's Dairyland

1st Stage 1

2011
2nd Overall Tour of America's Dairyland
Pan American Track Championships

3rd Omnium
3rd Points race

2012
National Track Championships

1st Team pursuit (with Jacquelyn Crowell and Lauren Tamayo)
2nd Points race

3rd Team pursuit, Pan American Track Championships
9th Overall Tour of America's Dairyland

1st Stage 7

2013
1st Points race, National Track Championships
3rd Athens Twilight Criterium
3rd Team pursuit, Los Angeles Grand Prix (with Elizabeth Newell, Lauren Tamayo and Jade Wilcoxson)
5th Overall Tour of America's Dairyland
2014
2nd Team pursuit, 2013–14 UCI Track Cycling World Cup, Guadalajara
2015
5th Overall Tour of America's Dairyland

1st Stage 6
