= 2015 Pan American Track Cycling Championships =

- Venue: Santiago, Chile
- Date: September 2–6, 2015
- Velodrome: Peñalolén
- Nations participating: 18

The 2015 Pan American Track Cycling Championships took place at the Peñalolén Velodrome, Santiago, Chile, September 2–6, 2015.

== Medal summary ==
=== Men ===
| Event | Gold | Silver | Bronze |
|---|---|---|---|
| Sprint | Fabián Puerta; Colombia | Njisane Phillip; Trinidad and Tobago | Hugo Barrette; Canada |
| 1 km time trial | Santiago Ramírez; Colombia | Ángel Pulgar; Venezuela | Jordan Parra; Colombia |
| Keirin | Fabián Puerta; Colombia | Hersony Canelón; Venezuela | Kacio Fonseca; Brazil |
| Scratch | Ignacio Prado; Mexico | Aidan Caves; Canada | Cristopher Mansilla; Chile |
| Points race | Luis Sepúlveda; Chile | Sean MacKinnon; Canada | Juan Curuchet; Argentina |
| Individual pursuit | Jhonatan Restrepo; Colombia | Sean MacKinnon; Canada | Edward Veal; Canada |
| Omnium | Juan Esteban Arango; Colombia | Ignacio Prado; Mexico | Rémi Pelletier-Roy; Canada |
| Madison | United States; Bobby Lea; Jacob Duehring | Colombia; Juan Esteban Arango; Jhonatan Restrepo | Chile; Luis Sepúlveda; Gonzalo Miranda |
| Team sprint | Venezuela; Hersony Canelón; Ángel Pulgar; César Marcano | Canada; Hugo Barrette; Joseph Veloce; Evan Carey | Brazil; Hugo Osteti; Flávio Cipriano; Kacio Fonseca |
| Team pursuit | Colombia; Juan Esteban Arango; Arles Castro; Jhonatan Restrepo; Jordan Parra | Canada; Edward Veal; Rémi Pelletier-Roy; Aidan Caves; Sean MacKinnon | Chile; Cristian Cornejo; Elias Tello; Luis Sepúlveda; Felipe Peñaloza |

=== Women ===
| Event | Gold | Silver | Bronze |
|---|---|---|---|
| Sprint | Jessica Salazar; Mexico | Juliana Gaviria; Colombia | Lisandra Guerra; Cuba |
| 500 m time trial | Jessica Salazar; Mexico | Juliana Gaviria; Colombia | Lisandra Guerra; Cuba |
| Keirin | Monique Sullivan; Canada | Martha Bayona; Colombia | Jessica Salazar; Mexico |
| Individual pursuit | Jennifer Valente; United States | Kelly Catlin; United States | Annie Foreman-Mackey; Canada |
| Points race | Stephanie Roorda; Canada | Kimberly Geist; United States | Arlenis Sierra; Cuba |
| Scratch | Jennifer Valente; United States | Allison Beveridge; Canada | Arlenis Sierra; Cuba |
| Omnium | Sarah Hammer; United States | Allison Beveridge; Canada | Angie González; Venezuela |
| Team sprint | Mexico; Luz Gaxiola; Jessica Salazar | Colombia; Martha Bayona; Juliana Gaviria | Canada; Monique Sullivan; Kate O'Brien |
| Team pursuit | United States; Kelly Catlin; Sarah Hammer; Ruth Winder; Jennifer Valente | Canada; Allison Beveridge; Stephanie Roorda; Kirsti Lay; Annie Foreman-Mackey | Chile; Denisse Ahumada; Flor Palma; Valentina Monsalve; Daniela Guajardo |

== Medal table ==
| Rank | Nation | Gold | Silver | Bronze | Total |
|---|---|---|---|---|---|
| 1 | Colombia (COL) | 6 | 4 | 2 | 12 |
| 2 | United States (USA) | 5 | 3 | 0 | 8 |
| 3 | Canada (CAN) | 3 | 8 | 5 | 16 |
| 4 | Mexico (MEX) | 3 | 1 | 1 | 5 |
| 5 | Venezuela (VEN) | 1 | 2 | 1 | 4 |
| 6 | Chile (CHI) | 1 | 0 | 3 | 4 |
| 7 | Trinidad and Tobago (TTO) | 0 | 1 | 0 | 1 |
| 8 | Cuba (CUB) | 0 | 0 | 4 | 4 |
| 9 | Brazil (BRA) | 0 | 0 | 2 | 2 |
| 10 | Argentina (ARG) | 0 | 0 | 1 | 1 |
| Totals (10 entries) | | 19 | 19 | 19 | 57 |
