= Rémi Pelletier-Roy =

Canadian cyclist (born 1990)

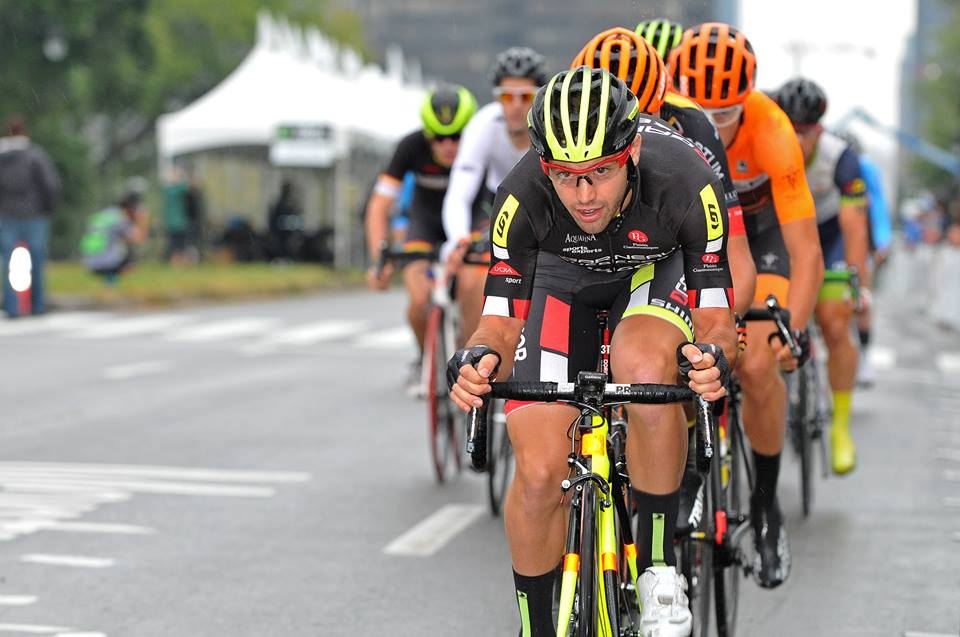
- Pelletier-Roy in 2015

Personal information
- Born: July 4, 1990 (age 36) Longueuil, Quebec, Canada
- Height: 1.73 m (5 ft 8 in)
- Weight: 65 kg (143 lb)

Cycling career
- Sport: Cycling
- Disciplines: Track; Road
- Role: Rider

Amateur team
- 2011–2012: Garneau–Club Chaussures–Norton Rose

Professional team
- 2013–2016: Team Québecor Garneau
Medal record
Representing Canada
Men's track cycling
Pan American Games
Bronze medal – third place	2015 Toronto	Team pursuit
Commonwealth Games
Bronze medal – third place	2014 Glasgow	Scratch
Pan American Championships
Silver medal – second place	2015 Santiago	Team pursuit
Bronze medal – third place	2014 Aguascalientes	Omnium
Bronze medal – third place	2015 Santiago	Omnium

Rémi Pelletier-Roy (born July 4, 1990) is a Canadian former track and road cyclist. He competed at several international competitions, including the UCI Track World Championships, 2011 and 2015 Pan American Games and 2014 Commonwealth Games. He won many international medals and World Cup podiums. He competed for UCI Continental team Team Québecor Garneau.

== Major results ==
=== Road ===
2011
3rd Overall Killington Stage Race
9th Time trial, Pan American Games
2012
1st Prologue Tour of Rwanda
1st Stage 1 (ITT) Green Mountain Stage Race
2013
5th Overall An Post Rás
2014
1st National Criterium Championships
1st Stage 1 Sea Otter Classic
5th Time trial, National Championships
