= Diego Yépez =

Mexican cyclist (born 1989)

Diego Yepez
Personal information
- Full name: Diego Jonathan Yepez Arellano
- Born: 13 September 1989 (age 37)

Cycling career
- Sport: Cycling
- Discipline: Track cycling
- Role: Rider
- Rider type: madison
Medal record
Representing Mexico
Men's track cycling
Pan American Championships
Gold medal – first place	2013 Mexico City	Madison
Bronze medal – third place	2011 Medellin	Madison
Bronze medal – third place	2013 Mexico City	Team pursuit

Diego Jonathan Yepez Arellano (born 13 September 1989) is a Mexican male track cyclist. He competed in the madison event at the 2014 UCI Track Cycling World Championships.
