= Adrian Hegyvary =

American cyclist (born 1984)

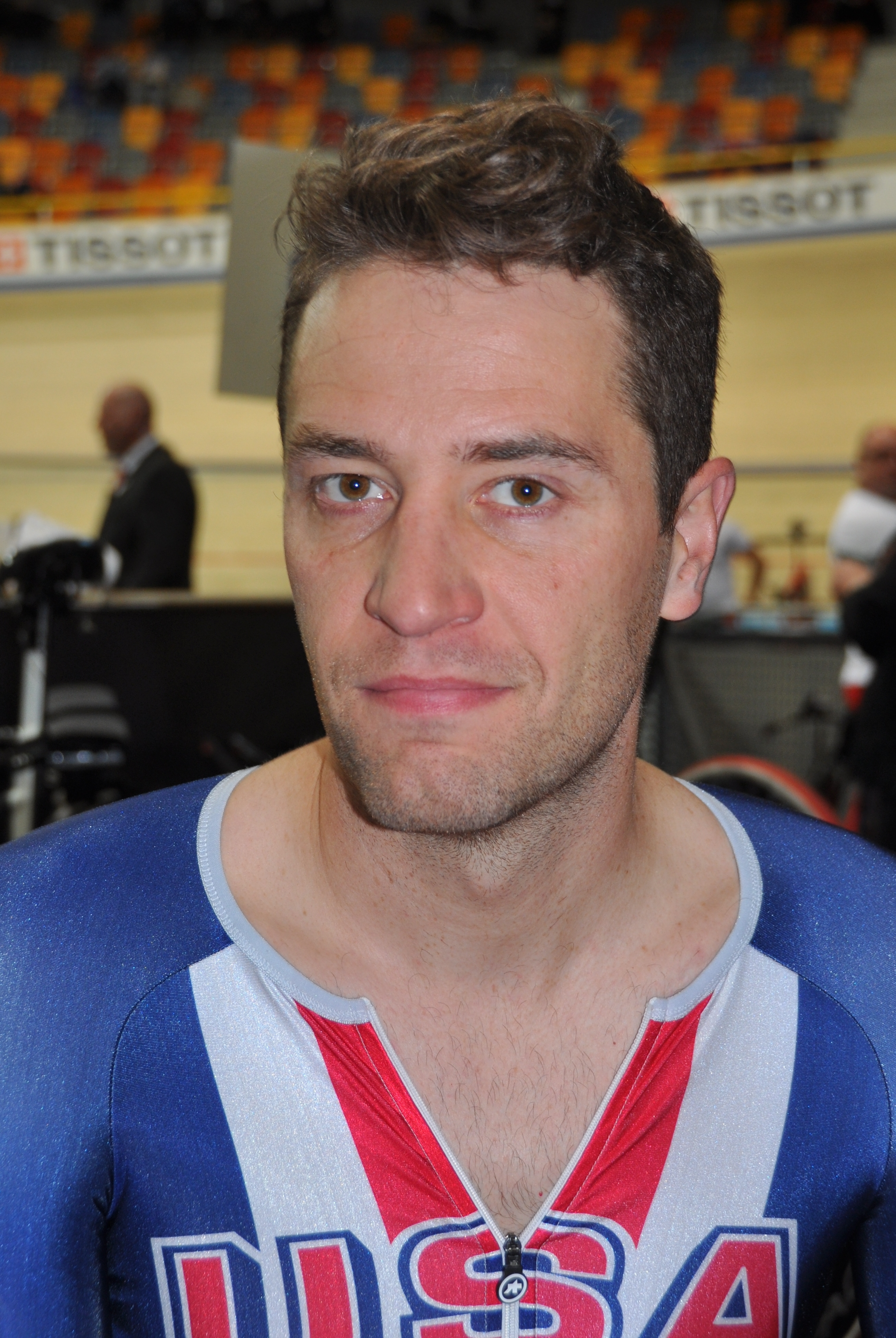
- Hegyvary at the 2018 UCI Track Cycling World Championships

Personal information
- Full name: Adrian M. Hegyvary
- Born: January 5, 1984 (age 42) Chicago, Illinois, U.S.
- Height: 6 ft 3 in (191 cm)
- Weight: 172 lb (78 kg)

Cycling career
- Sport: Cycling
- Disciplines: Road; Track
- Role: Rider
- Rider type: Time-trialist

Amateur teams
- 2006: Recycled Cycles p/b Raleigh
- 2007–2009: Hagens-Berman LLP
- 2019: Texas Roadhouse
- 2021–: Trust House

Professional team
- 2010–2018: UnitedHealthcare–Maxxis

Major wins
- National Team Pursuit Championships (2014)
Medal record
Representing the United States
Men's track cycling
Pan American Games
Gold medal – first place	2019 Lima	Team pursuit
Silver medal – second place	2019 Lima	Madison
Pan American Championships
Gold medal – first place	2018 Aguascalientes	Scratch
Gold medal – first place	2018 Aguascalientes	Madison
Silver medal – second place	2017 Couva	Team pursuit
Silver medal – second place	2019 Cochabamba	Madison
Silver medal – second place	2019 Cochabamba	Team pursuit

Adrian M. Hegyvary (born January 5, 1984, in Chicago) is an American track and road cyclist .

== Personal life ==
Hegyvary is married to New Zealand cyclist Rushlee Buchanan.

== Major results ==
=== Road ===
2010
6th National Time Trial Championships

=== Track ===
2014
1st National Team Pursuit Championships (with Zach Allison, Alexander Darville and Zak Kovalcik)
2017
National Track Championships

1st Madison (with Daniel Holloway

2018
National Track Championships

1st Madison (with Daniel Holloway

UCI Track Races

1st Gold, Madison (with Daniel Holloway); UCI Pan-American Championship - Aquascalientes, Mexico
1st Gold, Madison - Japan Track Cup I
1st Bronze, Madison (with Daniel Holloway); UCI World Cup #5 - Cambridge, New Zealand
3rd Bronze, Madison (with Daniel Holloway); UCI World Cup #2

2019
National Track Championships

1st Madison (with Daniel Holloway

UCI Track Races

2nd Silver, Madison (with Daniel Holloway); UCI Pan-American Championship
