= Lauren Tamayo =

American racing cyclist

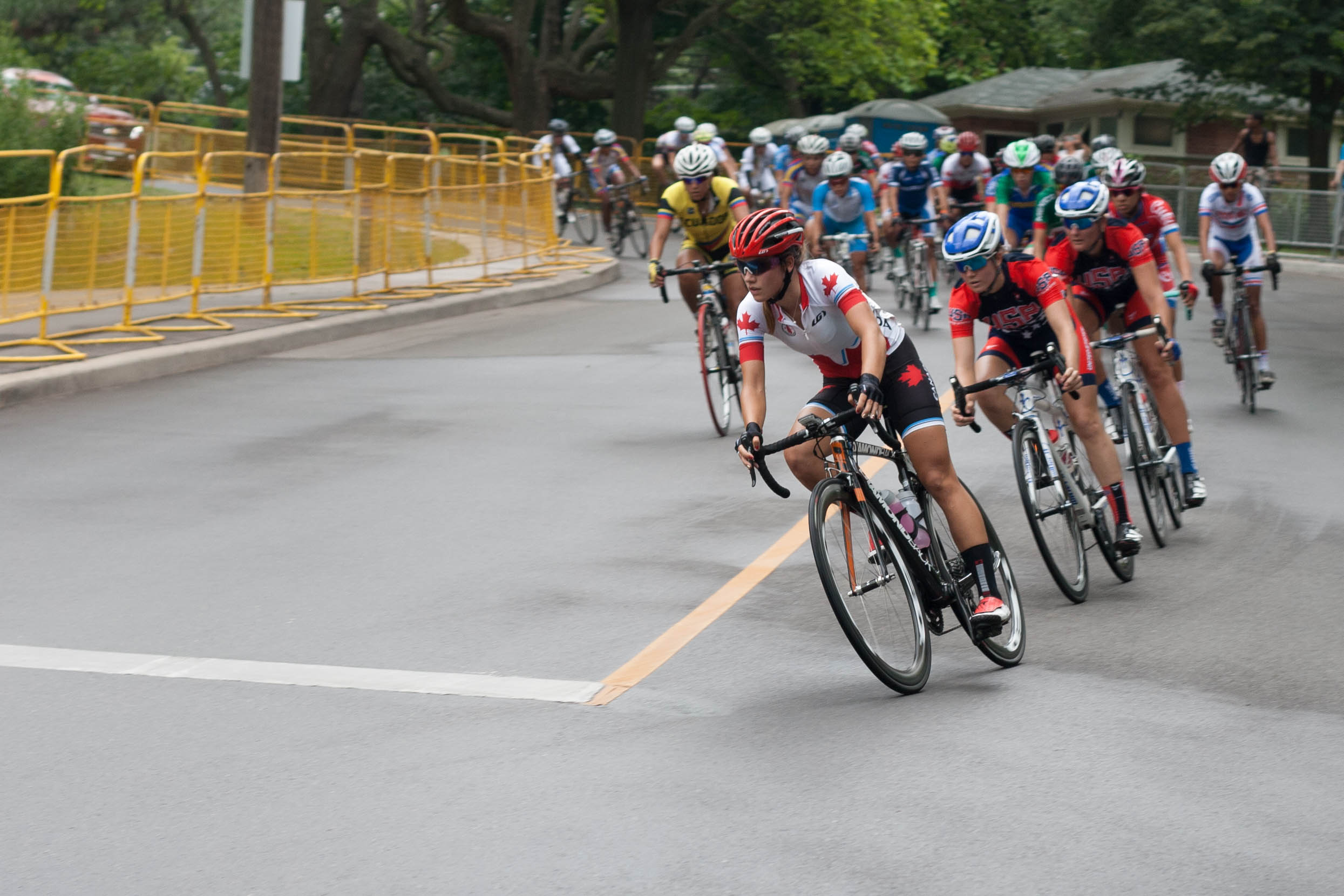
- Tamayo (in third place) at the 2015 Pan American Games

Personal information
- Born: October 25, 1983 (age 42) Bethlehem, Pennsylvania

Cycling career
- Sport: Cycling
- Current team: Team Lipton
- Disciplines: Road, Track
- Role: Rider

Professional teams
- 2003, 2005–2006: Victory Brewing
- 2007: Lipton
- 2008–: Team TIBCO
Medal record
Women's track cycling
Representing the United States
Olympic Games
Silver medal – second place	2012 London	Team pursuit
Pan American Games
Silver medal – second place	2015 Toronto	Team pursuit

Lauren Tamayo (formerly Lauren Franges, born October 26, 1983, in Barto) is an American professional racing cyclist.

== Career highlights ==
2001
3rd, National U19 Time Trial Championship, Redding, California
2004
2nd, National U23 Road Race Championship, Park City
2005
United States U23 Road Race Champion, Park City
2nd, National Points race Championship, Los Angeles
3rd, National U23 Time Trial Championship, Park City
2006
2nd, Saturn Rochester Twilight Criterium, Rochester, New York
2007
1st, Stage 5, Tour de Toona
2008
3rd, World Cup, Track, Team Pursuit, Los Angeles (with Kristin Armstrong & Christen King)

2012

2nd Silver medal London Olympics (with (Sarah Hammer)(Jenny Reed)& (Dotsie Bausch)
2013
3rd Team Pursuit, Los Angeles Grand Prix (with Cari Higgins, Elizabeth Newell and Jade Wilcoxson)
2015
2nd Team Pursuit, Pan American Games (with Kelly Catlin, Sarah Hammer, Ruth Winder and Jennifer Valente)
