= Stéphane Cossette =

Canadian track cyclist

Stephane Cossette
Personal information
- Born: 3 July 1989 (age 37)

Cycling career
- Sport: Cycling
- Discipline: Track cycling
- Role: Rider
- Rider type: sprinter

Stephane Cossette (born 3 July 1989) is a Canadian male track cyclist, riding for the national team. He competed in the team sprint event at the 2010 UCI Track Cycling World Championships.
