= Jorge Ríos (footballer) =

Peruvian footballer (born 1999)

Personal information
- Full name: Jorge Luis Emerson Ríos Guevara
- Date of birth: 7 December 1999 (age 26)
- Place of birth: Trujillo, Peru
- Height: 1.65 m (5 ft 5 in)
- Position: Midfielder

Youth career
- César Vallejo

Senior career*
Years	Team	Apps	(Gls)
2017–2022	César Vallejo	78	(1)
2023–2025	Sport Boys	64	(0)
- * Club domestic league appearances and goals as of 30 December 2025

Jorge Luis Emerson Ríos Guevara (born 12 December 1999) is a Peruvian footballer who plays as a midfielder.

== Club career ==
=== Cesar Vallejo ===
Ríos is a product of César Vallejo and got his official and professional debut for the club on 7 May 2017 against Defensor La Bocana in the Peruvian Primera División.

In December 2019, Ríos got his contract extended for one further year. One year later, in December 2020, Ríos signed a new one-year contract extension.

=== Sport Boys ===
In January 2023, ahead of the 2023 season, Ríos left César Vallejo to join fellow league club Sport Boys.

At the end of 2025, Ríos was one of 11 players that left Sport Boys.
