= José Infante =

Mexican cyclist

Personal information
- Full name: José Ramon Infante Aguirre
- Born: 31 August 1988 (age 38)

Cycling career
- Sport: Cycling
- Discipline: Track cycling
- Role: Rider
- Rider type: endurance

José Ramon Infante Aguirre (born 31 August 1988) is a Mexican male track cyclist. He competed at the 2010 and 2013 UCI Track Cycling World Championships.
