= Pablo Seisdedos =

Chilean cyclist (born 1988)

Personal information
- Full name: Pablo Jacob Seisdedos Duque
- Born: 26 January 1988 (age 38)

Cycling career
- Sport: Cycling
- Current team: Union Ciclista Curico
- Disciplines: Track; Road
- Role: Rider

Amateur teams
- 2014: Constructora de Vicente
- 2015: DVC–La Cuarta
- 2016: Grottes Sport
- 2017: BMC Exportxpert
- 2018: Team Molina
- 2019–: Kilometro Cero

Professional team
- 2014: PinoRoad
Medal record
Men's track cycling
Representing Chile
Pan American Games
| Silver medal – second place | 2011 Guadalajara | Team pursuit |
| Bronze medal – third place | 2019 Lima | Team pursuit |
Pan American Championships
| Gold medal – first place | 2009 Mexico City | Scratch |
| Gold medal – first place | 2012 Mar del Plata | Team pursuit |
| Silver medal – second place | 2007 Valencia | 1km time trial |
| Silver medal – second place | 2009 Mexico City | Omnium |
| Silver medal – second place | 2009 Mexico City | Team pursuit |
| Silver medal – second place | 2010 Aguascalientes | Team pursuit |
| Silver medal – second place | 2011 Medellin | Points race |
| Silver medal – second place | 2012 Mar del Plata | Scratch |
| Bronze medal – third place | 2013 Mexico City | Omnium |
| Bronze medal – third place | 2019 Lima | Team Pursuit |

Pablo Jacob Seisdedos Duque (born 26 January 1988) is a Chilean road and track cyclist. He competed at the 2010, 2011 and 2012 UCI Track Cycling World Championships.

== Major results ==
=== Road ===
2009
1st Stage 4 Vuelta a Mendoza
2014
3rd Time trial, National Road Championships
