= Sean MacKinnon =

Canadian cyclist

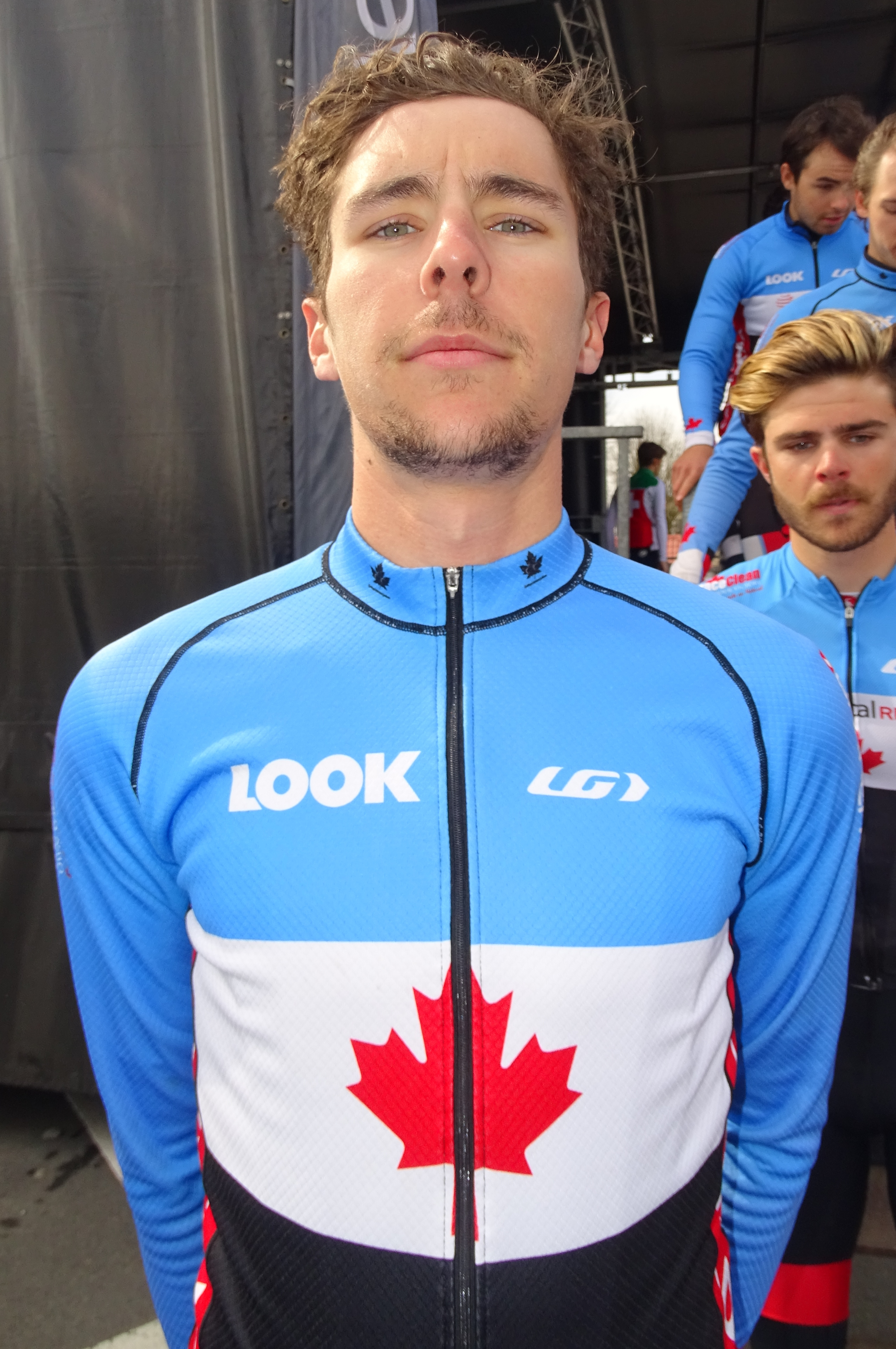

Personal information
- Born: 24 November 1995 (age 30) St. Catharines, Ontario, Canada
- Height: 1.83 m (6 ft 0 in)
- Weight: 75 kg (165 lb)

Cycling career
- Sport: Cycling
- Disciplines: Road; Track
- Role: Rider

Amateur teams
- 2016: Team RaceClean
- 2018–2019: RealDeal Racing

Professional team
- 2017: An Post–Chain Reaction
Medal record
Representing Canada
Men's track cycling
Pan American Games
Bronze medal – third place	2015 Toronto	Team pursuit
Pan American Championships
Silver medal – second place	2015 Santiago	Points race
Silver medal – second place	2015 Santiago	Individual pursuit
Silver medal – second place	2015 Santiago	Team pursuit
Men's road bicycle racing
Pan American Games
Bronze medal – third place	2015 Toronto	Time trial

Sean MacKinnon (born 24 November 1995) is a Canadian professional racing cyclist. He rode in the men's team pursuit at the 2016 UCI Track Cycling World Championships.

== Major results ==
2015
3rd Time trial, Pan American Games
2016
1st Young rider classification, Flèche du Sud
