= Mauro Agostini =

Argentine cyclist (born 1989)

Personal information
- Born: 18 October 1989 (age 36) Rafaela, Argentina

Cycling career
- Sport: Cycling
- Role: Rider
Medal record
Representing Argentina
Pan American Games
Silver medal – second place	2015 Toronto	Team Pursuit

Mauro Agostini (born 18 October 1989) is an Argentine professional racing cyclist. He rode at the 2015 UCI Track Cycling World Championships. Agostini won the silver medal at the 2015 Pan American Games in the men's team pursuit.
