= Ángel Pulgar =

Venezuelan cyclist (born 1989)

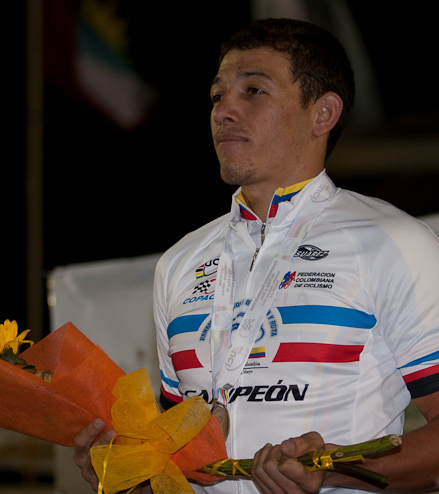

Personal information
- Full name: Ángel Ramiro Pulgar Araujo
- Born: 7 February 1989 (age 37)

Cycling career
- Sport: Cycling
- Discipline: Track
Medal record
Representing Venezuela
Men's track cycling
Pan American Games
Gold medal – first place	2011 Guadalajara	Team sprint
Silver medal – second place	2015 Toronto	Team sprint
Pan American Championships
Gold medal – first place	2011 Medellin	1km time trial
Gold medal – first place	2013 Mexico City	Team sprint
Gold medal – first place	2014 Aguascalientes	1km time trial
Gold medal – first place	2014 Aguascalientes	Team sprint
Gold medal – first place	2015 Santiago	Team sprint
Gold medal – first place	2018 Aguascalientes	Omnium
Silver medal – second place	2010 Aguascalientes	Team sprint
Silver medal – second place	2013 Mexico City	1km time trial
Silver medal – second place	2015 Santiago	1km time trial
Bronze medal – third place	2010 Aguascalientes	1km time trial
Bronze medal – third place	2011 Medellin	Team sprint
Bronze medal – third place	2012 Mar del Plata	Team sprint
Bronze medal – third place	2022 Lima	Omnium

Ángel Ramiro Pulgar Araujo (born 7 February 1989, in Barquisimeto) is a Venezuelan track cyclist. At the 2012 Summer Olympics, he competed in the Men's team sprint for the national team. At the 2016 Summer Olympics, he competed in the team sprint and the men's keirin.

== Palmarès ==
2008
Cuban National Track Championships

2nd Sprint
3rd 1 km time trial

2009
Venezuelan National Track Championships

1st 1 km time trial
2nd Keirin
2nd Sprint

2010
Pan American Road and Track Championships

1st Team sprint (with César Marcano and Hersony Canelón)
2nd 1 km time trial

2011
Pan American Road and Track Championships

1st 1 km time trial

Venezuelan National Track Championships

1st 1 km time trial
1st Keirin
2nd Sprint

1st Clasico Aniversario De La Federacion Veneolana De Ciclismo
2012
Venezuelan National Track Championships

1st 1 km time trial
1st Sprint
3rd Keirin

2013
Pan American Road and Track Championships

2nd 1 km time trial

2017

1st Stage 6 Vuelta Ciclista a Venezuela (Cagua - Altagracia de Orituco)
