= John Croom =

American cyclist (born 1993)

Personal information
- Full name: John C. Croom
- Born: August 22, 1993 (age 33) El Paso, Texas, U.S.
- Height: 6 ft 2 in (188 cm)
- Weight: 198 lb (90 kg)

Cycling career
- Sport: Cycling
- Role: Rider
Medal record
Men's track cycling
Representing the United States
Pan American Games
Gold medal – first place	2019 Lima	Team pursuit
Pan American Championships
Silver medal – second place	2019 Cochabamba	Team pursuit

John C. Croom (born August 22, 1993 in El Paso, Texas) is an American cyclist who races road and track cycling events. Croom moved to Rock Hill, South Carolina in 1999 with his family. He started cycling in 2012 after growing up with a football and wrestling background. John Croom is 6'2 and 198 lbs (90 kg).

== Major results ==
2021

National Track Championships

Madison
4km
Omnium
Team Pursuit
Elimination Race
Bronze Scratch Race

2019

USA National Team Pursuit Record 3:52.747

Pan American Championships

Silver Team Pursuit

Pan American Games

Gold Team Pursuit

National Track Championships

1km
Silver 4km Pursuit
Silver Team Pursuit
2018

National Track Championships

1km
Silver 4km Pursuit
Silver Team Pursuit
2017

National Track Championships

1km
Silver Team Pursuit
