= Alonso Gamero =

Peruvian cyclist

Personal information
- Full name: Alonso Miguel Gamero Zúñiga
- Born: 23 December 1992 (age 33) Arequipa, Peru

Cycling career
- Sport: Cycling
- Current team: Ciclismo Extremo Peruano
- Discipline: Road
- Role: Rider

Amateur teams
- 2012–2014: AQP Ciclo Arequipa
- 2015–2016: Team Bricquebec Cotentin
- 2015–2016: Internacional Arequipa
- 2016: Club Ciclismo Disarva
- 2017: Mister Oil.Goto Soluciones–La Ligua
- 2017: Ciclismo Extremo
- 2020: Team Bricquebec Cotentin
- 2021–: Ciclismo Extremo Peruano

Professional team
- 2018: A.C. Agrupación Virgen de Fátima

Alonso Miguel Gamero Zúñiga (born 23 December 1992) is a Peruvian road cyclist, who currently rides for Peruvian amateur team Ciclismo Extremo Peruano.

== Major results ==
2010
National Junior Road Championships

1st Time trial
2nd Road race

2011
3rd Time trial, South American Under-23 Road Championships
2013
National Under-23 Road Championships

2nd Road race
2nd Time trial

2014
National Under-23 Road Championships

1st Road race
1st Time trial

2015
2nd Overall Vuelta a Perú

1st Stage 4

2016
1st Road race, National Road Championships
2017
National Road Championships

1st Road race
1st Time trial

2nd Overall Vuelta a Perú

1st Stage 4

2018
1st Road race, National Road Championships
1st Stage 3 Vuelta al Ecuador
6th Overall Vuelta a Guatemala

1st Stages 1, 2 & 9

9th Road race, South American Games
2019
1st Stages 2 & 5 Vuelta a Chiriquí
6th Road race, Pan American Games
