= Ignacio Prado =

Mexican cyclist (born 1993)

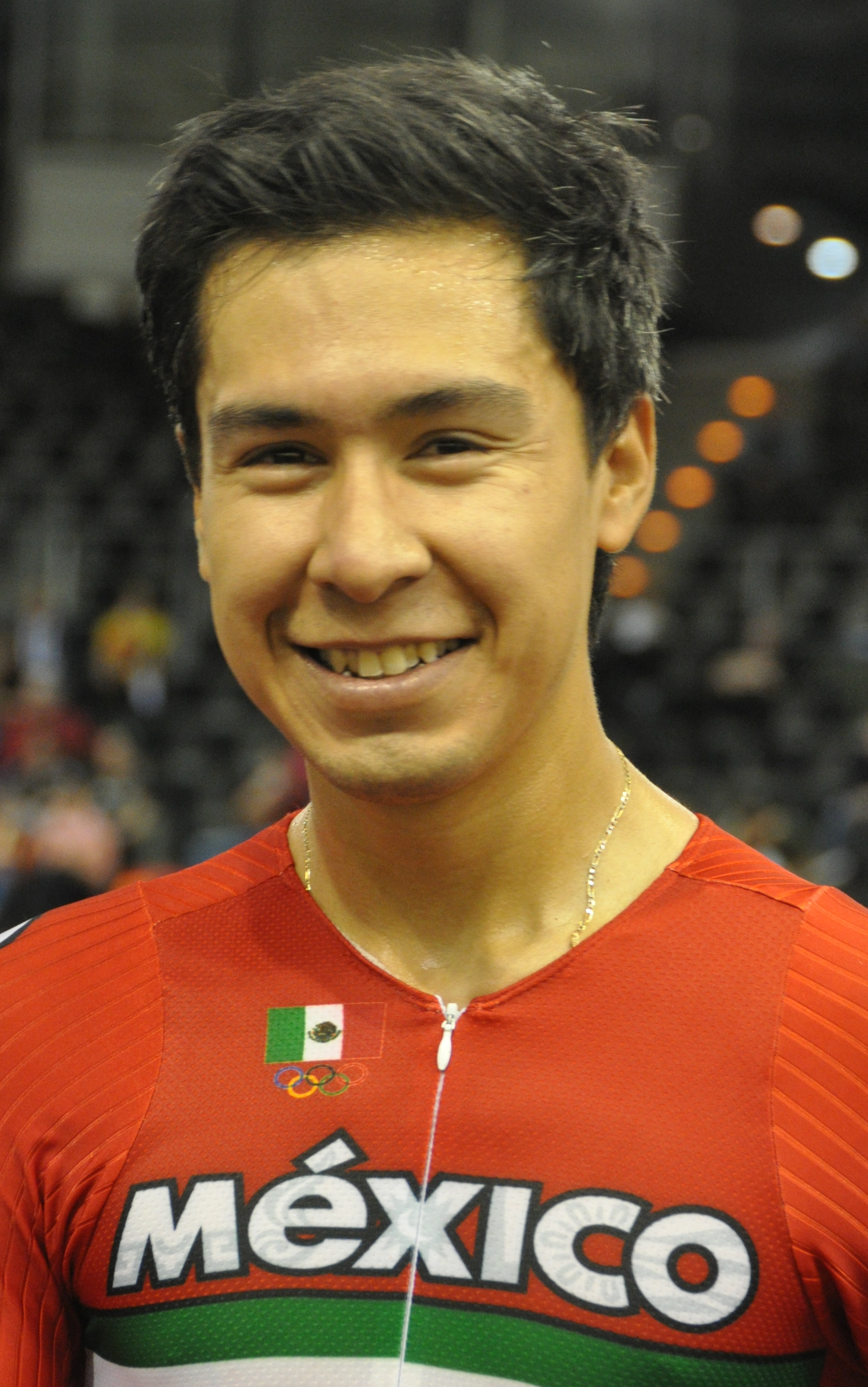
- Prado in 2018

Personal information
- Full name: Ignacio de Jesus Prado Juárez
- Born: 21 September 1993 (age 33) León, Guanajuato, Mexico
- Height: 1.78 m (5 ft 10 in)
- Weight: 65 kg (143 lb)

Cycling career
- Sport: Cycling
- Current team: Canel's–Java
- Disciplines: Road; Track
- Role: Rider

Amateur teams
- 2015–2016: Tennis Stars–Code GTO
- 2022: Canel's–Zerouno

Professional teams
- 2017: Sindicato de Empleados Publicos de San Juan
- 2018–2021: Canel's–Specialized
- 2023–: Canel's Pro Cycling

Major wins
- One-day races and Classics National Road Race Championships (2019) National Time Trial Championships (2017, 2020, 2021)
Medal record
Representing Mexico
Men's track cycling
World Championships
Silver medal – second place	2016 London	Scratch
Pan American Games
Silver medal – second place	2015 Toronto	Omnium
Silver medal – second place	2019 Lima	Omnium
Pan American Championships
Gold medal – first place	2015 Santiago	Scratch
Gold medal – first place	2017 Couva	Omnium
Gold medal – first place	2019 Cochabamba	Madison
Silver medal – second place	2015 Santiago	Omnium
Silver medal – second place	2019 Cochabamba	Omnium
Silver medal – second place	2019 Cochabamba	Scratch
Bronze medal – third place	2018 Aguascalientes	Omnium
Bronze medal – third place	2018 Aguascalientes	Team pursuit
Central American and Caribbean Games
Gold medal – first place	2026 Santo Domingo	Madison
Silver medal – second place	2026 Santo Domingo	Team pursuit
Men's road bicycle racing
Pan American Games
Silver medal – second place	2015 Toronto	Time trial
Silver medal – second place	2019 Lima	Road race
Pan American Championships
Gold medal – first place	2015 León	Under-23 time trial
Silver medal – second place	2014 Puebla	Under-23 time trial
Bronze medal – third place	2019 Ixmiquilpan	Time trial

Ignacio de Jesús Prado Juárez (born 21 September 1993) is a Mexican racing cyclist, who rides for UCI Continental team Canel's–Java. He won the silver medal in the men's scratch event at the 2016 UCI Track Cycling World Championships. He won the 2015 Pan American U23 Time Trial Championships gold medal.

== Major results ==
=== Road ===
2012
1st Stage 4 Ruta del Centro
2013
3rd Time trial, National Under-23 Road Championships
10th Road race, Pan American Under-23 Road Championships
2014
1st Time trial, National Under-23 Road Championships
1st Stage 2 Vuelta Mexico Telmex
2nd Time trial, Pan American Under-23 Road Championships
2015
1st Time trial, Pan American Under-23 Road Championships
National Road Championships

1st Road race
1st Under-23 road race
1st Under-23 time trial

2nd Time trial, Pan American Games
4th Overall Vuelta Mexico Telmex

1st Mexican rider classification
1st Young rider classification
1st Stage 1

2017
1st Time trial, National Road Championships
4th Time trial, Pan American Road Championships
2018
1st Stage 6 Vuelta Internacional Ciclista Michoacan
National Road Championships

3rd Time trial
5th Road race

8th Time trial, Pan American Road Championships
2019
National Road Championships

1st Road race
2nd Time trial

Pan American Games

2nd Road race
8th Time trial

3rd Time trial, Pan American Road Championships
2020
National Road Championships

1st Time trial
4th Road race

10th Gran Premio de la Patagonia
2021
National Road Championships

1st Time trial
5th Road race

2022
1st Stage 1 Vuelta al Ecuador
2023
1st Time trial, National Road Championships
1st Stage 2 Tour of the Gila

=== Track ===
2014
Central American and Caribbean Games

2nd Individual pursuit
2nd Team pursuit

2015
Pan American Track Championships

1st Scratch
2nd Omnium

1st Individual pursuit, National Championships
2nd Omnium, Pan American Games
2016
2nd Scratch, UCI Track World Championships
2017
1st Omnium, Pan American Track Championships
2018
Central American and Caribbean Games

1st Individual pursuit
1st Team pursuit
2nd Omnium

2nd Omnium, 2018–19 UCI Track Cycling World Cup, London
Pan American Track Championships

3rd Omnium
3rd Team pursuit

2019
Pan American Track Championships

1st Madison (with Ignacio Sarabia)
2nd Omnium
2nd Scratch

2nd Omnium, Pan American Games
2020
1st Madison (with Ulises Alfredo Castillo), National Championships
2023
Central American and Caribbean Games

1st Madison (with Fernando Nava)
2nd Team pursuit
