= Jorge Rios (cyclist) =

Portuguese cyclists

Personal information
- Nicknames: Pirenaico, El Pátron,
- Born: 7 July 1972 (age 54) Paços de Ferreira, Portugal
- Height: 1.70 m (5 ft 7 in)
- Weight: 60 kg (132 lb)

Cycling career
- Sport: Cycling
- Current team: Retired
- Discipline: Road
- Role: Rider
- Rider type: Climbing specialist

Amateur teams
- 1990: Tensai - Sontec - Etiel
- 1991: V.C. Fort Mahon

Professional teams
- 1992-1998: Avila Rojas
- 1999: Nagares
- 2000: Covama-C.C.Nieves
- 2001–2002: Distribudora Japonesa
- 2003-2005: Triple Gordo Lara
- 2006: Café Baqué
- 2007: Café Quetzal - Sello Verde
- 2008: Telco'm - Aldabea
- 2009: Belca
- 2010: Alas Rojas de Santa Lucía

Major wins
- Vuelta a Perú 2005

Jorge Rios (born 7 July 1972, in Paços de Ferreira, Portugal) was a professional road racing cyclist from 1992 to 2010, where he decided to end his career as a professional road racing cyclist.

== Results ==
Mountain Jerseys

1991, Tour des Pyrénées - Vuelta a los Pirineos
1992, Tour des Pyrénées - Vuelta a los Pirineos
1993, Tour des Pyrénées - Vuelta a los Pirineos
1994, Volta Ciclista Provincia Tarragona
1994, Tour des Pyrénées - Vuelta a los Pirineos
1995, Vuelta Ciclista a Aragón
1995, Tour des Pyrénées - Vuelta a los Pirineos
1995, Vuelta Ciclista Internacional a Extremadura
1996, Vuelta Ciclista Internacional a Extremadura
1996, Tour des Pyrénées - Vuelta a los Pirineos
1997, Tour des Pyrénées - Vuelta a los Pirineos
1997, Vuelta Ciclista Internacional a Extremadura
1998, Vuelta Ciclista a la Rioja
1998, Vuelta Ciclista a Navarra
1998, Tour des Pyrénées - Vuelta a los Pirineos
1999, Vuelta Ciclista a la Rioja
1999, Volta Ciclista Provincia Tarragona
1999, Vuelta a Tenerife
2000, Tour des Pyrénées - Vuelta a los Pirineos
2000, Vuelta a la Argentina
2001, Vuelta Ciclista del Uruguay
2001, Vuelta Ciclista a la Republica del Ecuador
2001, Vuelta a Venezuela
2001, Tour des Pyrénées - Vuelta a los Pirineos
2002, Vuelta a Venezuela
2002, Vuelta Ciclista del Uruguay
2002, Vuelta Ciclista de Chile
2003, Vuelta Ciclista del Uruguay
2003, Vuelta a Venezuela
2003, Vuelta a Guatemala
2004, Vuelta a Venezuela
2004, Vuelta a Guatemala
2004, Vuelta a Costa Rica
2005, Vuelta a Perú
2005, Vuelta a Venezuela
2005, Vuelta Mazatlán
2006, Tour des Pyrénées - Vuelta a los Pirineos
2007, Vuelta a Perú
2007, Vuelta Ciclista a la Republica del Ecuador
2008, Volta a Coruña
2008, Volta a Galicia
2008, Vuelta a Ávila
2009, Vuelta a Tenerife
2009, Volta Ciclista Provincia Tarragona
2010, Vuelta el Salvador
2010, Vuelta Ciclista del Uruguay

Races

1st, Overall, Vuelta a Perú
