= Gideoni Monteiro =

Brazilian cyclist

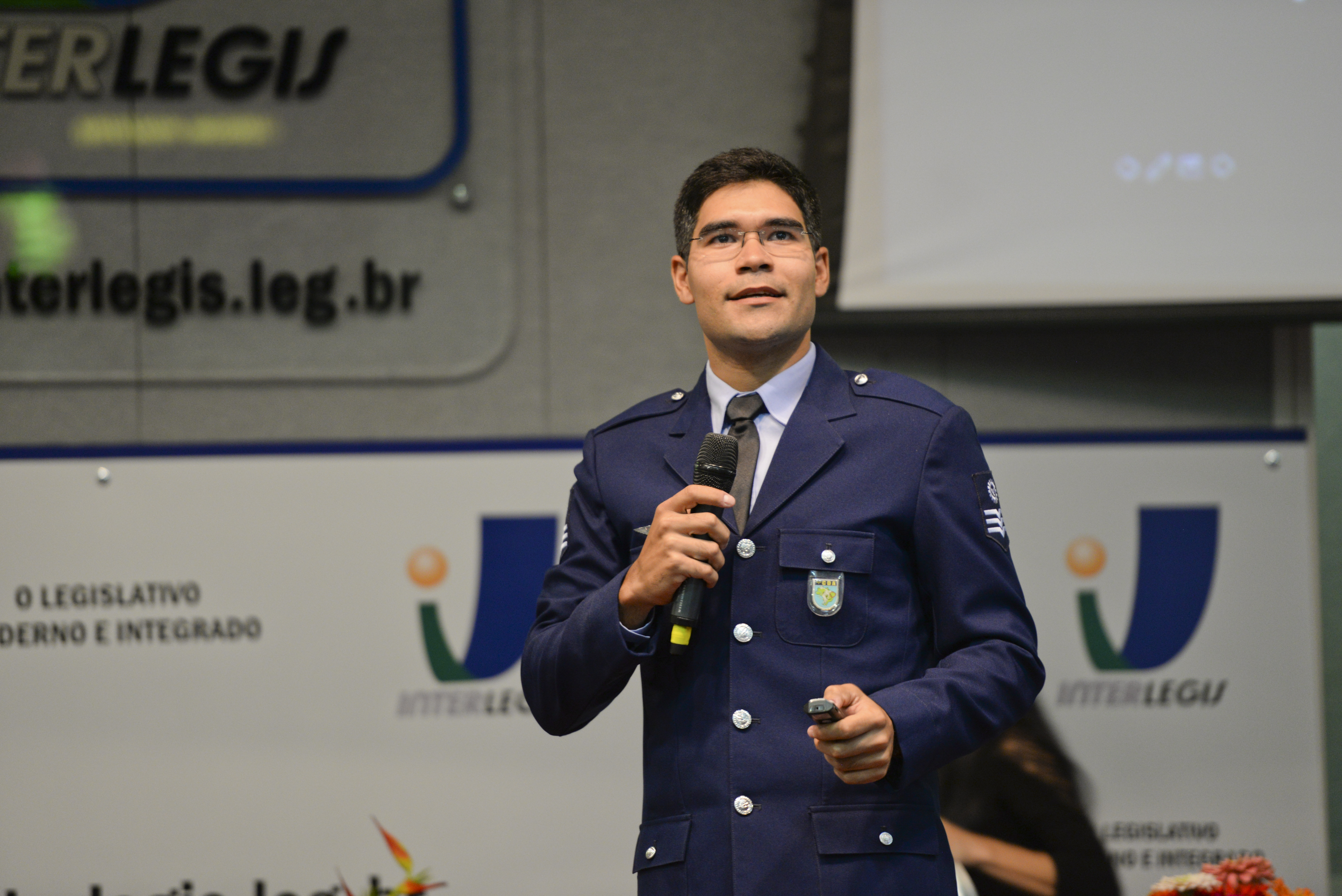
- Monteiro in 2016

Personal information
- Full name: Gideoni Rodrigues Monteiro
- Born: 2 September 1989 (age 37)

Cycling career
- Sport: Cycling
- Disciplines: Road cycling Track cycling
- Role: Rider
- Rider type: omnium
Medal record
Pan American Games
Bronze medal – third place	2015 Toronto	Omnium

Gideoni Rodrigues Monteiro (born 2 September 1989) is a Brazilian male road and track cyclist.

== Career ==
On the road he competed at the 2008 UCI Road World Championships and 2009 UCI Road World Championships. He competed in the omnium event at the 2015 UCI Track Cycling World Championships.

He competed in the omnium event at the 2016 UCI Track Cycling World Championships finishing 18th. Thus he also guaranteed his classification to 2016 Olympic Games in Rio de Janeiro.
