= Antonio Cabrera (cyclist) =

Chilean cyclist (born 1981)

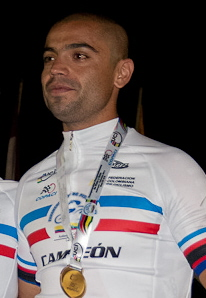
- Cabrera in 2011

Personal information
- Full name: Antonio Roberto Cabrera Torres
- Born: 10 November 1981 (age 44)

Cycling career
- Sport: Cycling
- Discipline: Track cycling
- Role: Rider
- Rider type: team pursuit
Medal record
Men's track cycling
Representing Chile
Pan American Games
Gold medal – first place	2003 Santo Domingo	Team pursuit
Gold medal – first place	2019 Lima	Madison
Silver medal – second place	2011 Guadalajara	Team pursuit
Bronze medal – third place	2019 Lima	Team pursuit
Pan American Championships
Gold medal – first place	2002 Quito	Team pursuit
Gold medal – first place	2006 São Paulo	Team pursuit
Gold medal – first place	2011 Medellin	Madison
Gold medal – first place	2012 Mar del Plata	Madison
Gold medal – first place	2012 Mar del Plata	Team pursuit
Gold medal – first place	2016 Aguascalientes	Madison
Silver medal – second place	2008 Montevideo	Team pursuit
Silver medal – second place	2009 Mexico City	Team pursuit
Silver medal – second place	2010 Aguascalientes	Team pursuit
Silver medal – second place	2011 Medellin	Team pursuit
Silver medal – second place	2017 Couva	Points race
Bronze medal – third place	2008 Montevideo	Points race
Bronze medal – third place	2016 Aguascalientes	Team pursuit
Bronze medal – third place	2017 Couva	Team pursuit
Bronze medal – third place	2018 Aguascalientes	Madison
Bronze medal – third place	2018 Aguascalientes	Scratch
Bronze medal – third place	2019 Cochabamba	Madison
Bronze medal – third place	2021 Lima	Madison

Antonio Roberto Cabrera Torres (born 10 November 1981) is a Chilean male track cyclist. He competed in the team pursuit event at the 2012 UCI Track Cycling World Championships.
