= Cycling at the 2010 South American Games =

- Dates: March 17–23

There were four cycling events at the 2010 South American Games: road cycling, track cycling, mountain bike and BMX racing, adding up to 28 events. The events were held over March 17–23.

== Medal summary ==
=== Road cycling ===
| Event | Gold | Silver | Bronze |
|---|---|---|---|
Men's events
| Men's road race | Santiago Botero; Colombia | Luis Felipe Laverde; Colombia | Byron Guamá; Ecuador |
| Men's time trial | Santiago Botero; Colombia | Matías Médici; Argentina | Fabio Duarte; Colombia |
Women's events
| Women's road race | Paola Madriñán; Colombia | Rosane Kirch; Brazil | María Luisa Calle; Colombia |
| Women's time trial | María Luisa Calle; Colombia | Paola Madriñán; Colombia | Valeria Müller; Argentina |

=== Track cycling ===
| Event | Gold | Silver | Bronze |
|---|---|---|---|
Men's events
| Men's 1 km time trial | Fabián Puerta; Colombia | Jonathan Marín; Colombia | Davi Romeo; Brazil |
| Men's individual pursuit | Juan Esteban Arango; Colombia | Juan Pablo Suárez; Colombia | Marco Antonio Quinchel; Chile |
| Men's team pursuit | Juan Esteban Arango; Edwin Ávila; Arles Castro; Weimar Roldán; Colombia | Pablo Duque; Marco Antonio Quinchel; Antonio Torres; Gonzalo Figueroa; Chile | Fernando Antogna; Cristian Martinez; Eduardo Sepúlveda; Edgardo Simón; Argentina |
| Men's individual sprint | Christian Tamayo; Colombia | Leonardo Narváez; Colombia | Mauricio Quiroga; Argentina |
| Men's team sprint | Leonardo Narváez; Fabián Puerta; Christian Tamayo; Colombia | Christian Zelada; Pablo Zelada; Christopher Almonacid; Chile | Emiliano Fernandez; Mauricio Quiroga; Diego Fernando Vargas; Argentina |
| Men's points race | Marco Quinchel; Chile | Edwin Ávila; Colombia | Walter Pérez; Argentina |
| Men's Keirin | Leonardo Narváez; Colombia | Christian Tamayo; Colombia | Mauricio Quiroga; Argentina |
| Men's Madison | Carlos Quishpe; Bayron de la Cruz; Ecuador | Sebastian Donadio; Walter Pérez; Argentina | Carlos Ospina; Weimar Roldán; Colombia |
| Men's scratch race | Carlos Alzate; Colombia | Dario Colla; Argentina | Sebastian Cancio; Argentina |
| Men's Omnium | Carlos Urán; Colombia | Sebastian Cancio; Argentina | Pablo Seisdedos; Chile |
Women's events
| Women's 500m time trial | Diana García; Colombia | Milena Salcedo; Colombia | Sumaia Ribeiro; Brazil |
| Women's individual pursuit | María Luisa Calle; Colombia | Janildes Fernandes; Brazil | Sérika Gulumá; Colombia |
| Women's team pursuit | María Luisa Calle; Leidy Natalia Muñoz Ruiz; Lorena Vargas; Colombia | Angie González; Maria Briceno; Francismar Pinto; Venezuela | Janildes Fernandes; Valquiria Pardial; Fernanda Souza; Brazil |
| Women's individual sprint | Diana García; Colombia | Milena Salcedo; Colombia | Sumaia Ribeiro; Brazil |
| Women's team sprint | Diana García; Milena Salcedo; Colombia | Maira Barbosa; Sumaia Ribeiro; Brazil | Angie González; Marines Prada; Venezuela |
| Women's points race | Lorena Vargas; Colombia | Angie González; Venezuela | Maria Parra Constante; Ecuador |
| Women's Keirin | Diana García; Colombia | Milena Salcedo; Colombia | Daiana Almada; Argentina |
| Women's scratch race | Lorena Vargas; Colombia | Paola Andrea Grandon; Chile | Janildes Fernandez; Brazil |

=== Mountain biking ===
| Event | Gold | Silver | Bronze |
|---|---|---|---|
Men's event
| Men's cross-country | Héctor Leonardo Páez; Colombia | Rubens Valeriano; Brazil | Fabio Castañeda; Colombia |
Women's event
| Women's cross-country | Laura Abril; Colombia | Maria Elisa Jaramillo; Chile | Alexandra Serrano; Ecuador |

=== BMX ===
| Event | Gold | Silver | Bronze |
|---|---|---|---|
Men's events
| Men's 20" | Augusto Castro; Colombia | José Díaz Montaña; Colombia | Felipe Faúndez; Chile |
| Men's 24" | Augusto Castro; Colombia | José Díaz Montaña; Colombia | Andrés Jiménez; Colombia |
Women's events
| Women's 20" | Mariana Pajón; Colombia | Gabriela Díaz; Argentina | Andrea Zuluaga; Colombia |
| Women's 24" | Mariana Pajón; Colombia | Stefany Hernández; Venezuela | Andrea Zuluaga; Colombia |

== Medal table ==
* Host nation (Colombia)

| Rank | Nation | Gold | Silver | Bronze | Total |
|---|---|---|---|---|---|
| 1 | Colombia (COL)* | 26 | 12 | 9 | 47 |
| 2 | Chile (CHI) | 1 | 4 | 3 | 8 |
| 3 | Ecuador (ECU) | 1 | 0 | 2 | 3 |
| 4 | Argentina (ARG) | 0 | 5 | 8 | 13 |
| 5 | Brazil (BRA) | 0 | 4 | 5 | 9 |
| 6 | Venezuela (VEN) | 0 | 3 | 1 | 4 |
| Totals (6 entries) | | 28 | 28 | 28 | 84 |
