= Cycling at the 2011 Pan American Games – Men's omnium =

Cycling – Men's Omnium at the 2011 Pan American Games
- Venue: Pan American Velodrome
- Dates: October 18–19
- Competitors: 11 from 11 nations

Medalists
Gold medal	Juan Esteban Arango	Colombia
Silver medal	Luis Mansilla	Chile
Bronze medal	Walter Perez	Argentina

The men's omnium competition of the cycling events at the 2011 Pan American Games was held between October 18 and 19 at the Pan American Velodrome in Guadalajara. The event was a new addition to the track cycling program at the Pan American Games.

== Results ==
=== Flying Lap ===
Rank	Name	Nation	Time
1	Juan Esteban Arango	Colombia	13.069
2	Rubén Companioni	Cuba	13.379
3	Luis Mansilla	Chile	13.515
4	Jacob Schwingboth	Canada	13.550
5	Carlos Linares	Venezuela	13.552
6	Walter Perez	Argentina	13.567
7	Robson Dias	Brazil	13.616
8	Jorge Pérez	Dominican Republic	13.666
9	Cesar Vaquera	Mexico	13.850
10	José Ragonessi	Ecuador	14.349
11	Manuel Rodas	Guatemala	14.805

=== Points Race ===
Rank	Name	Nation	Points
1	Manuel Rodas	Guatemala	77
2	Jorge Pérez	Dominican Republic	76
3	José Ragonessi	Ecuador	72
4	Walter Perez	Argentina	65
5	Juan Esteban Arango	Colombia	18
6	Luis Mansilla	Chile	17
7	Rubén Companioni	Cuba	14
8	Jacob Schwingboth	Canada	11
9	Cesar Vaquera	Mexico	DNF
10	Robson Dias	Brazil	DNF
11	Carlos Linares	Venezuela	DNF

=== Elimination Race ===
Rank	Name	Nation
1	Luis Mansilla	Chile
2	Juan Esteban Arango	Colombia
3	Jorge Pérez	Dominican Republic
4	Walter Perez	Argentina
5	José Ragonessi	Ecuador
6	Robson Dias	Brazil
7	Carlos Linares	Venezuela
8	Rubén Companioni	Cuba
9	Cesar Vaquera	Mexico
10	Jacob Schwingboth	Canada
11	Manuel Rodas	Guatemala

=== Individual Pursuit ===
Rank	Name	Nation	Time
1	Juan Esteban Arango	Colombia	4:23.864
2	Rubén Companioni	Cuba	4:30.156
3	Walter Perez	Argentina	4:31.181
4	Luis Mansilla	Chile	4:32.802
5	Carlos Linares	Venezuela	4:36.244
6	Cesar Vaquera	Mexico	4:38.173
7	Manuel Rodas	Guatemala	4:38.447
8	Jorge Pérez	Dominican Republic	4:41.123
9	Robson Dias	Brazil	4:42.655
10	José Ragonessi	Ecuador	REL
–	Jacob Schwingboth	Canada	DNS

=== Scratch Race ===
Rank	Name	Nation	Laps down
1	Manuel Rodas	Guatemala	
2	José Ragonessi	Ecuador	–1
3	Juan Esteban Arango	Colombia	–1
4	Luis Mansilla	Chile	–1
5	Cesar Vaquera	Mexico	–1
6	Robson Dias	Brazil	–2
7	Walter Perez	Argentina	–2
8	Jorge Pérez	Dominican Republic	–2
9	Rubén Companioni	Cuba	–2
10	Carlos Linares	Venezuela	DNF

=== 1 km Time Trial ===
Rank	Name	Nation	Time
1	Juan Esteban Arango	Colombia	1:01.177
2	Luis Mansilla	Chile	1:04.015
3	Rubén Companioni	Cuba	1:04.320
4	Walter Perez	Argentina	1:05.043
5	Robson Dias	Brazil	1:05.385
6	Carlos Linares	Venezuela	1:05.687
7	Jorge Pérez	Dominican Republic	1:05.701
8	José Ragonessi	Ecuador	1:07.238
9	Cesar Vaquera	Mexico	1:07.434
10	Manuel Rodas	Guatemala	1:10.107

=== Final standings ===
Rank	Name	Nation	Points
1st place, gold medalist(s)	Juan Esteban Arango	Colombia	13
2nd place, silver medalist(s)	Luis Mansilla	Chile	20
3rd place, bronze medalist(s)	Walter Perez	Argentina	28
4	Rubén Companioni	Cuba	31
5	Jorge Pérez	Dominican Republic	36
6	José Ragonessi	Ecuador	38
7	Manuel Rodas	Guatemala	41
8	Robson Dias	Brazil	54
9	Cesar Vaquera	Mexico	58
10	Carlos Linares	Venezuela	65
11	Jacob Schwingboth	Canada	DNF
