= Cycling at the 2011 Pan American Games – Men's team pursuit =

Cycling – Men's team pursuit at the 2011 Pan American Games
- Venue: Pan American Velodrome
- Dates: October 17
- Competitors: 32 from 8 nations

Medalists
Gold medal	Juan Esteban Arango; Edwin Ávila; Arles Castro; Weimar Roldán	Colombia
Silver medal	Antonio Cabrera; Gonzalo Miranda; Pablo Seisdedos; Luis Sepúlveda	Chile
Bronze medal	Maximiliano Almada; Marcos Crespo; Walter Perez; Eduardo Sepúlveda	Argentina

The men's team pursuit competition of the cycling events at the 2011 Pan American Games will be held on October 17 at the Pan American Velodrome in Guadalajara. The defending Pan American Games champion is Enzo Cesario, Marco Arriagada, Luis Sepúlveda and Gonzalo Miranda of Chile.

== Schedule ==
All times are Central Standard Time (UTC−6).

Date	Time	Round
October 17, 2011	10:00	Qualifying
October 17, 2011	16:00	Final

== Results ==
8 teams of four competitors competed. The top two teams will race for gold, while third and fourth race for the bronze medals.

=== Qualification ===
Rank	Name	Nation	Time	Notes
1	Juan Esteban Arango; Edwin Ávila; Arles Castro; Weimar Roldán	Colombia	4:00.126	Q
2	Antonio Cabrera; Gonzalo Miranda; Pablo Seisdedos; Luis Sepúlveda	Chile	4:03.882	Q
3	Maximiliano Almada; Marcos Crespo; Walter Perez; Eduardo Sepúlveda	Argentina	4:08.887	q
4	Juan Aldapa; Edibaldo Maldonado; Cristian Medina; Diego Yepez	Mexico	4:12.402	q
5	Robert Britton; Jean‐Michel Lachance; Rémi Pelletier‐Roy; Jacob Schwingboth	Canada	4:14.389	
6	Armando Camargo; Robson Dias; Tiago Nardin; Luiz Carlos Tavares	Brazil	4:14.634	
7	Yans Arias; Rubén Companioni; Leandro Marcos; Pedro Sibila	Cuba	4:15.824	
8	Byron Guamá; Segundo Navarrete; Carlos Quishpe; José Ragonessi	Ecuador	4:21.800	

=== Finals ===
Rank	Name	Nation	Time
Gold Medal Race
1st place, gold medalist(s)	Juan Esteban Arango; Edwin Ávila; Arles Castro; Weimar Roldán	Colombia	3:59.236
2nd place, silver medalist(s)	Antonio Cabrera; Gonzalo Miranda; Pablo Seisdedos; Luis Sepúlveda	Chile	OVL
Bronze Medal Race
3rd place, bronze medalist(s)	Maximiliano Almada; Marcos Crespo; Walter Perez; Eduardo Sepúlveda	Argentina	
4	Juan Aldapa; Edibaldo Maldonado; Cristian Medina; Diego Yepez	Mexico	OVL
