= Cycling at the 2010 South American Games – Men's sprint =

The Men's Individual Sprint event at the 2010 South American Games was held over March 19–20. The qualifications were held on the first day and quarterfinals, semifinals and finals on the following day.

== Medalists ==
Gold	Silver	Bronze
Christian Tamayo; Colombia	Leonardo Narváez; Colombia	Mauricio Quiroga; Argentina

== Results ==
=== Qualification ===
Rank	Rider	Time	Speed	Q
1	Leonardo Narváez (COL)	10.483	68.682	Q
2	Christian Tamayo (COL)	10.545	68.278	Q
3	Vanderlei Gonçalves (BRA)	10.942	65.801	Q
4	Marcos Alcantara (BRA)	10.949	65.759	Q
5	Mauricio Quiroga (ARG)	10.956	65.717	Q
6	Christopher Javier Almonacid (CHI)	11.098	64.876	Q
7	Diego Fernando Vargas (ARG)	11.100	64.864	Q
8	Juan Sivira (VEN)	11.104	64.841	Q
9	Christian Andres Zelada (CHI)	11.213	64.211	
10	Cesar Marcano (VEN)	11.249	64.005	
11	Jair Tjon En Fa (SUR)	11.820	60.913	

=== Quarterfinals ===
Heat	Rank	Rider	Race 1	Race 2	Decider	Q
1	1	Leonardo Narváez (COL)	11.378	11.442		Q
1	2	Juan Sivira (VEN)				
2	1	Christian Tamayo (COL)	11.371	11.082		Q
2	2	Diego Fernando Vargas (ARG)				
3	1	Christopher Javier Almonacid (CHI)		11.559	12.070	Q
3	2	Vanderlei Gonçalves (BRA)	11.437		DNF	
4	1	Mauricio Quiroga (ARG)		10.917	11.058	Q
4	2	Marcos Alcántara (BRA)	11.112			

=== Semifinals ===
Heat	Rank	Rider	Race 1	Race 2	Decider	Q
1	1	Leonardo Narváez (COL)	10.900	11.176		QF
1	2	Mauricio Quiroga (ARG)				QB
2	1	Christian Tamayo (COL)	10.969	11.377		QF
2	2	Christopher Javier Almonacid (CHI)				QB

=== Finals ===
==== Final 5–8 ====
Rank	Rider	Race 1
5	Juan Sivira (VEN)	11.261
6	Marcos Alcantara (BRA)	
7	Vanderlei Gonçalves (BRA)	
8	Diego Fernando Vargas (ARG)	DNS

==== Finals ====
Heat	Rank	Rider	Race 1	Race 2	Decider
1	1st place, gold medalist(s)	Christian Tamayo (COL)	11.253		11.095
1	2nd place, silver medalist(s)	Leonardo Narváez (COL)		11.171	
2	3rd place, bronze medalist(s)	Mauricio Quiroga (ARG)		11.171	11.229
2	4	Christopher Javier Almonacid (CHI)	10.800		
