= Cycling at the 2010 South American Games – Men's Keirin =

The Men's Keirin event at the 2010 South American Games was held on March 21. The qualifications and repechage were held on the morning and the semifinals and finals on the evening.

== Medalists ==
Gold	Silver	Bronze
Leonardo Narváez; Colombia	Christian Tamayo; Colombia	Mauricio Quiroga; Argentina

== Results ==
=== First round ===
==== Heat 1 ====
Rank	Rider	Q
1	Leonardo Narváez (COL)	Q
2	Diego Fernando Vargas (ARG)	Q
3	Cesar Marcano (VEN)	
4	Pablo Esteban Zelada (CHI)	
5	Fernando Fermino (BRA)	
6	Jair Tjon En Fa (SUR)	

==== Heat 2 ====
Rank	Rider	Q
1	Christian Tamayo (COL)	Q
2	Davi Romeo (BRA)	Q
3	Mauricio Quiroga (ARG)	
4	Juan Sivira (VEN)	
5	Gabriel Aguiar (URU)	
	Christian Andres Zelada (CHI)	

=== Repechage ===
==== Repechage 1 ====
Rank	Rider	Q
1	Cesar Marcano (VEN)	Q
2	Juan Sivira (VEN)	
3	Gabriel Aguiar (URU)	
	Jair Tjon En Fa (SUR)	DNS

==== Repechage 2 ====
Rank	Rider	Q
1	Mauricio Quiroga (ARG)	Q
2	Christian Andres Zelada (CHI)	
3	Fernando Fermino (BRA)	
4	Pablo Esteban Zelada (CHI)	

=== Final ===
Rank	Rider
1st place, gold medalist(s)	Leonardo Narváez (COL)
2nd place, silver medalist(s)	Christian Tamayo (COL)
3rd place, bronze medalist(s)	Mauricio Quiroga (ARG)
4	Davi Romeo (BRA)
5	Cesar Marcano (VEN)
	Diego Fernando Vargas (ARG)
