= Cycling at the 2011 Pan American Games – Men's team sprint =

Cycling – Men's team sprint at the 2011 Pan American Games
- Venue: Pan American Velodrome
- Dates: October 17
- Competitors: 18 from 6 nations

Medalists
Gold medal	Hersony Canelón; César Marcano; Ángel Pulgar	Venezuela
Silver medal	Michael Blatchford; Dean Tracy; James Watkins	United States
Bronze medal	Jonathan Marín; Fabián Puerta; Christian Tamayo	Colombia

The men's team sprint competition of the cycling events at the 2011 Pan American Games will be held on October 17 at the Pan American Velodrome in Guadalajara. The defending Pan American Games champion is Ahmed López, Julio César Herrera and Yosmani Poll of Cuba.

== Schedule ==
All times are Central Standard Time (UTC-6).

Date	Time	Round
October 17, 2011	10:40	Qualifying
October 17, 2011	16:30	Final

== Results ==
6 teams of three competitors each competed. The top two teams will race for gold, while third and fourth race for the bronze medals.

=== Qualification ===
Rank	Name	Nation	Time	Notes
1	Hersony Canelón; César Marcano; Ángel Pulgar	Venezuela	43.999	Q PR
2	Michael Blatchford; Dean Tracy; James Watkins	United States	44.227	Q
3	Jonathan Marín; Fabián Puerta; Christian Tamayo	Colombia	45.112	q
4	Leandro Bottasso; Jonathan Gatto; Facundo Lezica	Argentina	47.058	q
5	Carlos Carrasco; Ruben Horta; César Vaquera	Mexico	47.456	
6	Jean‐Michel Lachance; Rémi Pelletier-Roy; Jacob Schwingboth	Canada	48.460	

=== Finals ===
Rank	Name	Nation	Time
Gold Medal Race
1st place, gold medalist(s)	Hersony Canelón; César Marcano; Ángel Pulgar	Venezuela	43.188 PR
2nd place, silver medalist(s)	Michael Blatchford; Dean Tracy; James Watkins	United States	44.036
Bronze Medal Race
3rd place, bronze medalist(s)	Jonathan Marín; Fabián Puerta; Christian Tamayo	Colombia	45.080
4	Leandro Bottasso; Jonathan Gatto; Facundo Lezica	Argentina	46.725
