= Cycling at the 2010 South American Games – Men's team sprint =

The Men's Team Sprint event at the 2010 South American Games was held on March 18. The qualification was held on the morning and the finals on the evening.

== Medalists ==
Gold	Silver	Bronze
Leonardo Narváez; Fabián Puerta; Christian Tamayo; Colombia	Christian Zelada; Pablo Zelada; Christopher Almonacid; Chile	Emiliano Fernandez; Mauricio Quiroga; Diego Fernando Vargas; Argentina

== Results ==
=== Qualification ===
Rank	Team	Lap 1	Lap 2	Final	Speed	Q
1	Colombia; Leonardo Narváez; Fabián Puerta; Christian Tamayo	18.529 (1)	31.920 (1)	46.190	58.454	QF
2	Chile; Christian Zelada; Pablo Zelada; Christopher Almonacid	18.764 (2)	32.882 (2)	47.581	56.745	QF
3	Argentina; Emiliano Fernandez; Mauricio Quiroga; Diego Fernando Vargas	18.819 (4)	32.883 (3)	47.814	56.468	QB
4	Brazil; Marcos Alcantara; Fernando Fermino; Davi Romeo	19.208 (5)	33.286 (5)	48.136	56.091	QB
5	Venezuela; Cesar Marcano; Darwin Villa; Juan Sivira	18.791 (3)	33.077 (4)	48.270	55.935	

=== Finals ===
Rank	Team	Lap 1	Lap 2	Final	Speed
1st place, gold medalist(s)	Colombia; Leonardo Narváez; Fabián Puerta; Christian Tamayo	18.576 (1)	32.098 (1)	46.119	58.544
2nd place, silver medalist(s)	Chile; Christian Zelada; Pablo Zelada; Christopher Almonacid	18.790 (2)	33.346 (2)	47.981	56.272
3rd place, bronze medalist(s)	Argentina; Emiliano Fernandez; Mauricio Quiroga; Diego Fernando Vargas	18.617 (1)	46.603 (1)	1:12.666	37.156
4	Brazil; Marcos Alcantara; Fernando Fermino; Davi Romeo			DSQ	
