= Cycling at the 2011 Pan American Games – Women's Keirin =

Cycling – Women's Keirin at the 2011 Pan American Games
- Venue: Pan American Velodrome
- Dates: October 20
- Competitors: 7 from 7 nations

Medalists
Gold medal	Daniela Larreal	Venezuela
Silver medal	Daniela Gaxiola	Mexico
Bronze medal	Dana Feiss	United States

The women's keirin competition of the cycling events at the 2011 Pan American Games was held on October 20 at the Pan American Velodrome in Guadalajara. This event was not held at the 2007 Pan American Games, therefore there is no defending champion.

== Schedule ==
All times are Central Standard Time (UTC−6).

Date	Time	Round
October 20, 2011	16:15	Final

== Results ==
=== Final ===
As there was only seven competitors, a straight final was held without a qualification and repechage round.

Rank	Name	Nation	Notes
1st place, gold medalist(s)	Daniela Larreal	Venezuela	
2nd place, silver medalist(s)	Daniela Gaxiola	Mexico	
3rd place, bronze medalist(s)	Dana Feiss	United States	
4	Sumaia Ribeiro	Brazil	
5	Deborah Coronel	Argentina	
6	Diana García	Colombia	
7	Lisandra Guerra	Cuba	
