= 2010 Pan American Cycling Championships =

- Venue: Aguascalientes, Mexico
- Date(s): May 8–15, 2010
- Velodrome: Velódromo Bicentenario

The 2010 Pan American Cycling Championships took place in Aguascalientes, Mexico on May 8–15, 2010.

== Medal summary ==
=== Road ===
==== Men ====
Event	Gold	Silver	Bronze
Road race	Carlos Oyarzun; Chile	Arnold Alcolea; Cuba	Raúl Grangel; Cuba
Time trial	Iván Casas; Colombia	Carlos Oyarzun; Chile	Freddy Montaña; Colombia

==== Women ====
Event	Gold	Silver	Bronze
Road race	Shelley Evans; United States	Joëlle Numainville; Canada	Dalila Rodríguez Hernandez; Cuba
Time trial	Paola Madriñán; Colombia	Amber Neben; United States	Shelley Evans; United States

=== Track ===
==== Men ====
Event	Gold	Silver	Bronze
Sprint	Travis Smith; Canada	Njisane Phillip; Trinidad and Tobago	Leonardo Narváez; Colombia
1 km time trial	Christopher Sellier; Trinidad and Tobago	Travis Smith; Canada	Ángel Pulgar; Venezuela
Keirin	Hersony Canelón; Venezuela	Barry Forde; Barbados	Leonardo Narváez; Colombia
Individual pursuit	Juan Pablo Suárez; Colombia	Juan Esteban Arango; Colombia	Eduardo Sepúlveda; Argentina
Scratch	Carlos Ospina; Colombia	Cody O'Reilly; United States	Luis Mansilla; Chile
Points race	Weimar Roldán; Colombia	Jorge Luis Montenegro; Ecuador	José Infante; Mexico
Omnium	Carlos Urán; Colombia	Ruben Campanioni; Cuba	Luis Mansilla; Chile
Madison	Colombia; Carlos Ospina; Weimar Roldán	Dominican Republic; Rafael German; Augusto Sánchez	Argentina; Marcos Crespo; Martin Ercila
Team sprint	Colombia; Leonardo Narváez; Christian Tamayo; Fabián Puerta	Venezuela; Ángel Pulgar; César Marcano; Hersony Canelón	Trinidad and Tobago; Njisane Phillip; Azikiwe Kellar; Christopher Sellier
Team pursuit	Colombia; Juan Pablo Suárez; Arles Castro; Weimar Roldán; Edwin Ávila	Chile; Enzo Cesario; Pablo Seisdedos; Antonio Cabrera; Luis Mansilla	Cuba; Pedro Sibila; Reldys Pérez; Yans Carlos; Ruben Campanioni

==== Women ====
Event	Gold	Silver	Bronze
Sprint	Lisandra Guerra; Cuba	Diana García; Colombia	Daniela Larreal; Venezuela
500 m time trial	Lisandra Guerra; Cuba	Monique Sullivan; Canada	Nancy Contreras; Mexico
Keirin	Lisandra Guerra; Cuba	Daniela Larreal; Venezuela	Diana García; Colombia
Individual pursuit	Sarah Hammer; United States^{[WR1]}	María Luisa Calle; Colombia	Dalila Rodríguez; Cuba
Scratch	Yumari González; Cuba	Sofía Arreola; Mexico	Paola Muñoz; Chile
Points race	Theresa Cliff-Ryan; United States	Lorena Vargas; Colombia	Danielys García; Venezuela
Omnium	Sarah Hammer; United States	Angie González; Venezuela	María Luisa Calle; Colombia
Team sprint	Cuba; Lisandra Guerra; Arianna Herrera	Colombia; Diana García; Juliana Gaviria	Mexico; Nancy Contreras; Daniela Gaxiola
Team pursuit	United States^{[WR2]} Dotsie Bausch; Sarah Hammer; Lauren Tamayo	Cuba; Yudelmis Domínguez; Yumari González; Dalila Rodríguez	Colombia; María Luisa Calle; Leidy Muñoz; Lorena Vargas

==== Notes ====
- ^{^{WR1}} Sarah Hammer set a world record of 3'22"269 in the qualification round of the women's individual pursuit.
- ^{^{WR2}} The United States set a world record of 3'19"569 to win the women's team pursuit.

== Medal table ==
Rank	Nation	Gold	Silver	Bronze	Total
1	Colombia (COL)	9	5	6	20
2	Cuba (CUB)	5	3	4	12
3	United States (USA)	5	2	1	8
4	Venezuela (VEN)	1	3	3	7
5	Canada (CAN)	1	3	0	4
6	Chile (CHI)	1	2	3	6
7	Trinidad and Tobago (TTO)	1	1	1	3
8	Mexico (MEX)	0	1	3	4
9	Barbados (BAR)	0	1	0	1
9	Dominican Republic (DOM)	0	1	0	1
9	Ecuador (ECU)	0	1	0	1
12	Argentina (ARG)	0	0	2	2
Totals (12 entries)		23	23	23	69
