= Cycling at the 2011 Pan American Games – Women's team sprint =

Cycling – Women's team sprint at the 2011 Pan American Games
- Venue: Pan American Velodrome
- Dates: October 17
- Competitors: 14 from 7 nations

Medalists
Gold medal	Daniela Larreal; Mariaesthela Vilera	Venezuela
Silver medal	Diana García; Juliana Gaviria	Colombia
Bronze medal	Nancy Contreras; Daniela Gaxiola	Mexico

The women's team sprint competition of the cycling events at the 2011 Pan American Games was held on October 17 at the Pan American Velodrome in Guadalajara. This event was not held at the 2007 Pan American Games, and therefore was to make its debut at the games.

== Schedule ==
All times are Central Standard Time (UTC−6).

Date	Time	Round
October 17, 2011	11:10	Qualifying
October 17, 2011	16:40	Final

== Results ==
Seven pairs of two competitors each competed. The top two pairs race for gold, while third and fourth race for the bronze medals.

=== Qualification ===
Rank	Name	Nation	Time	Notes
1	Daniela Larreal; Mariaesthela Vilera	Venezuela	33.854	Q PR
2	Diana García; Juliana Gaviria	Colombia	34.375	Q
3	Nancy Contreras; Daniela Gaxiola	Mexico	34.453	q
4	Elizabeth Carlson; Madalyn Godby	United States	34.788	q
5	Lisandra Guerra; Arianna Herrera	Cuba	34.907	
6	Talia Aguirre; Deborah Coronel	Argentina	36.953	
7	Sumaia Ribeiro; Clemilda Silva	Brazil	–	DSQ

=== Finals ===
Rank	Name	Nation	Time
Gold Medal Race
1	Daniela Larreal; Mariaesthela Vilera	Venezuela	33.611 PR
2	Diana García; Juliana Gaviria	Colombia	34.049
Bronze Medal Race
3	Nancy Contreras; Daniela Gaxiola	Mexico	34.617
4	Elizabeth Carlson; Madalyn Godby	United States	34.993
