= Cycling at the 2011 Pan American Games – Women's sprint =

Cycling – Women's sprint at the 2011 Pan American Games
- Venue: Pan American Velodrome
- Dates: October 18
- Competitors: 11 from 7 nations

Medalists
Gold medal	Lisandra Guerra	Cuba
Silver medal	Daniela Larreal	Venezuela
Bronze medal	Diana García	Colombia

The women's sprint competition of the cycling events at the 2011 Pan American Games will be held on October 18 at the Pan American Velodrome in Guadalajara. The defending champion is Diana Orrego of Colombia.

== Schedule ==
All times are Central Standard Time (UTC−6).

Date	Time	Round
October 18, 2011	10:00	Qualifying
October 18, 2011	11:15	Quarterfinals
October 18, 2011	16:00	5-8th places
October 18, 2011	17:20	Semifinals
October 18, 2011	19:00	Final

== Results ==
=== Qualification ===
The top eight riders qualify for the quarterfinals.

Rank	Name	Nation	Time	Notes
1	Daniela Larreal	Venezuela	10.995	Q, PR
2	Lisandra Guerra	Cuba	11.126	Q
3	Diana García	Colombia	11.293	Q
4	Sumaia Ribeiro	Brazil	11.336	Q
5	Juliana Gaviria	Colombia	11.341	Q
6	Daniela Gaxiola	Mexico	11.463	Q
7	Dana Feiss	United States	11.503	Q
8	Laura Arias	Cuba	11.593	Q
9	Nancy Contreras	Mexico	11.616	
10	Gleydimar Tapia	Venezuela	11.652	
11	Deborah Coronel	Argentina	12.194	

=== Quarterfinals ===
Heat	Rank	Name	Nation	Time	Notes
1	1	Daniela Larreal	Venezuela	11.802	Q
1	2	Laura Arias	Cuba		
2	1	Lisandra Guerra	Cuba	12.217	Q
2	2	Dana Feiss	United States		
3	1	Diana García	Colombia	11.484	Q
3	2	Daniela Gaxiola	Mexico		
4	1	Juliana Gaviria	Colombia	11.850	Q
4	2	Sumaia Ribeiro	Brazil		

=== Semifinals ===
Heat	Rank	Name	Nation	Time	Notes
1	1	Daniela Larreal	Venezuela	11.802	Q
1	2	Juliana Gaviria	Colombia	11.850	
2	1	Lisandra Guerra	Cuba	12.217	Q
2	2	Diana García	Colombia	11.484	

=== Finals ===
Rank	Name	Nation	Race 1	Race 2	Decider
Gold Medal Races
1st place, gold medalist(s)	Lisandra Guerra	Cuba	11.604	11.753	
2nd place, silver medalist(s)	Daniela Larreal	Venezuela			
Bronze Medal Races
3rd place, bronze medalist(s)	Diana García	Colombia	11.617	11.600	
4	Juliana Gaviria	Colombia			
