= Cycling at the 2010 South American Games – Men's team pursuit =

The Men's Team Pursuit event at the 2010 South American Games was held on March 19.

== Medalists ==
Gold	Silver	Bronze
Juan Esteban Arango; Edwin Ávila; Arles Castro; Weimar Roldán; Colombia	Pablo Duque; Marco Antonio Quinchel; Antonio Torres; Gonzalo Figueroa; Chile	Fernando Antogna; Cristian Martinez; Eduardo Sepúlveda; Edgardo Simón; Argentina

== Results ==
=== Qualification ===
Rank	Team	1000m	2000m	3000m	Final	Speed	Q
1	Colombia; Juan Esteban Arango; Edwin Ávila; Arles Castro; Weimar Roldán	1:07.866 (2)	2:09.006 (2)	3:10.241 (1)	4:11.388	57.281	QF
2	Chile; Pablo Duque; Marco Antonio Quinchel; Antonio Torres; Gonzalo Figueroa	1:06.312 (1)	2:08.529 (1)	3:11.836 (2)	4:15.938	56.263	QF
3	Argentina; Fernando Antogna; Cristian Martinez; Eduardo Sepúlveda; Edgardo Simón	1:09.169 (3)	2:12.206 (3)	3:15.730 (3)	4:20.716	55.232	QB
4	Brazil; Armando Camargo; Leandro Lamelina; Thiago Nardin; Marcos Novello	1:11.310 (4)	2:16.130 (4)	3:22.427 (4)	4:30.549	53.225	QB

=== Finals ===
Rank	Team	1000m	2000m	3000m	Final	Speed
1st place, gold medalist(s)	Colombia; Juan Esteban Carvajal; Edwin Ávila; Arles Castro; Weimar Roldán	1:06.774 (2)	2:06.311 (1)	3:07.132 (1)		
2nd place, silver medalist(s)	Chile; Pablo Duque; Marco Antonio Quinchel; Antonio Torres; Gonzalo Figueroa	1:06.625 (1)	2:08.162 (2)	3:11.022 (2)	OVL	
3rd place, bronze medalist(s)	Argentina; Fernando Antogna; Cristian Martinez; Eduardo Sepúlveda; Edgardo Simón	1:08.479 (2)	2:10.857 (1)			
4	Brazil; Armando Camargo; Leandro Lamelina; Thiago Nardin; Marcos Novello	1:06.954 (1)	2:13.930 (2)		OVL	
