= Cycling at the 2010 South American Games – Men's points race =

The Men's Points Race event at the 2010 South American Games was held on March 20.

== Medalists ==
Gold	Silver	Bronze
Marco Quinchel; Chile	Edwin Ávila; Colombia	Walter Pérez; Argentina

== Results ==
Distance: 120 laps (30 km) with 12 sprint
Elapsed time: 38:20.826
Average Speed: 46.939 km/h

Rank	Rider	Sprint												Finish	Lap Points			Total
Rank	Rider	1	2	3	4	5	6	7	8	9	10	11	12	Finish	+	–	Balance	Total
1st place, gold medalist(s)	Marco Quinchel (CHI)		5				3				2	2		7	60		60	72
2nd place, silver medalist(s)	Edwin Ávila (COL)	2	2	2	5	3		5	5	2			5	1	40		40	71
3rd place, bronze medalist(s)	Walter Pérez (ARG)								2	5	3	5		11	40		40	55
4	Yosvangs Rojas (VEN)	5	1				1	2						10	40		40	49
5	Bayron Guama de la Cruz (ECU)	1					2		1	1	1			5	40		40	46
6	Milton Wynants (URU)								3	3	5	3	1	4	20		20	35
7	Weimar Roldán (COL)			3	2	5						1	3	2				14
8	Luis Almonacid (CHI)	3			1			3						6				7
9	Marcos Novello (BRA)												2	3				2
10	Armando Camargo (BRA)													9				0
11	Edgard Nicolas Palma (URU)													8		20	–20	–20
	Carlos Linares (VEN)																	DNF
	Carlos Quishpe (ECU)			5		1									20		20	DNF
	Gerardo Fernandez (ARG)		3	1	3	2	5	1							40		40	DNF
	Victor Hugo Mercado (BOL)															40	–40	DNF
