= Daniela Larreal =

Venezuelan cyclist (1973–2024)

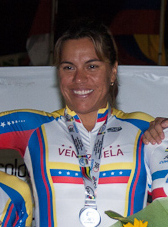
- Larreal in 2011

Personal information
- Full name: Daniela Greluis Larreal Chirinos
- Born: 2 October 1973 (Note: Based on the majority of reliable sources. However, the website of the 2012 Olympic Games said she was born in 1972.) Maracaibo, Zulia, Venezuela
- Died: 11 August 2024 (aged 50) (Note: Larreal was pronounced dead on 15 August 2024.) Las Vegas, Nevada, U.S.

Cycling career
- Sport: Cycling
- Discipline: Road
- Role: Rider
- Rider type: Sprinter

Professional team
- 1993–1996: Club Café Fortaleza
Medal record
Women's track cycling
Representing Venezuela
UCI Track Cycling World Cup
Gold medal – first place	1996 Overall Ranking	Points race
Gold medal – first place	2003 Overall Ranking	Sprint
Bronze medal – third place	2003 Overall Ranking	Keirin
Pan American Games
Gold medal – first place	2011 Guadalajara	Keirin
Gold medal – first place	2011 Guadalajara	Team sprint
Silver medal – second place	2003 Santo Domingo	Sprint
Silver medal – second place	2003 Santo Domingo	Keirin
Silver medal – second place	2011 Guadalajara	Sprint
Pan American Cycling Championships
Gold medal – first place	1992 Quito	Sprint
Gold medal – first place	1997 Cali	Sprint
Gold medal – first place	2005 Mar del Plata	Keirin
Gold medal – first place	2012 Mar del Plata	Team sprint
Silver medal – second place	1997 Cali	500m
Silver medal – second place	2010 Aguascalientes	Keirin
Silver medal – second place	2011 Medellin	Team sprint
Silver medal – second place	2014 Aguascalientes	Team sprint
Bronze medal – third place	2010 Aguascalientes	Sprint
Bronze medal – third place	2011 Medellin	Sprint
Bronze medal – third place	2014 Aguascalientes	Keirin
Bronze medal – third place	2014 Aguascalientes	Sprint
South American Games
Gold medal – first place	2014 Santiago	Sprint
Gold medal – first place	2014 Santiago	Team sprint
Silver medal – second place	2014 Santiago	Keirin
Central American and Caribbean Games
Gold medal – first place	1998 Maracaibo	Sprint
Gold medal – first place	2002 San Salvador	Sprint
Gold medal – first place	2002 San Salvador	Keirin
Gold medal – first place	2002 San Salvador	Scratch
Gold medal – first place	2010 Mayagüez	Sprint
Gold medal – first place	2010 Mayagüez	500m Time trial
Gold medal – first place	2010 Mayagüez	Keirin
Gold medal – first place	2010 Mayagüez	Team sprint
Silver medal – second place	1990 Mexico City	Sprint
Silver medal – second place	1993 Ponce	Sprint
Silver medal – second place	1993 Ponce	Points race
Silver medal – second place	1998 Maracaibo	500m Time trial
Silver medal – second place	2002 San Salvador	500m Time trial
Bronze medal – third place	1998 Maracaibo	Points race

Daniela Greluis Larreal Chirinos (2 October 1973 – 11 August 2024) was a Venezuelan track cyclist – a five-time Olympian considered one of Venezuela's most important sportspeople and the leading Venezuelan cyclist for over two decades. She had a brief road cycling career in the 1990s, and set the Olympic record for women's track time trial in 2000. She spent the last eight years of her life in exile.

Competing mainly in American competitions, she achieved over 35 international medals in her career; there were 24 years between her first and last podium finishes. She also raced in the UCI Track Cycling World Cup, medalling in various stages. In the later years of her career, Venezuela fell into a state of crisis, with Larreal critical of corruption among sporting bodies. Under the presidency of Nicolás Maduro, Larreal became more widely critical of how her country was run. Her activism saw her forced into exile in the United States, where she joined the Venezuelan political opposition.

== Early and personal life ==
Daniela Greluis Larreal Chirinos was born on 2 October 1973 in Maracaibo, Zulia, Venezuela, the daughter of cyclist Daniel Larreal, who won a silver medal at the 1971 Pan American Games and was considered the best cyclist in Venezuelan history. She was also Indigenous. Her mother was called Gladis Teresa. Her father introduced her to cycling; she was already fast on a velodrome track when young and began competing when she was 8, representing the Capital District in the 1986 youth Vuelta de Lara. She preferred swimming as a child and was the Venezuelan junior freestyle swimming champion over both 50m and 100m when she was 13. She then began training seriously in track cycling in 1989. At one point, Larreal began studying police science but put this aside to focus on cycling. She later completed a degree in physical education in Venezuela, having studied alongside her career. When she moved to the United States, she started a two-year course for the equivalent qualification.

Like other successful athletes, the Venezuelan regime awarded Larreal with a house and car; after leaving the country, Larreal revealed to Spanish media that such houses were being invaded by squatters due to the crisis in Venezuela, and the cars were cheap models that she could cycle faster than.

== Career ==
=== 1990s ===
Larreal's first championship was the 1990 Central American and Caribbean Games, where she was the only female track cyclist from Venezuela to compete and won the silver medal in the sprint. Still a teenager, she next competed at the VIII National Youth Games held in Maracaibo in 1991, winning two gold medals, for sprint and pursuit. Larreal then achieved her first international gold medal at the 1992 Pan American Track Championships in Quito, doing so by setting a new championship record of 13.619 seconds in the individual sprint. The placement qualified her to compete at the 1992 Summer Olympics, where she went out in the second round repechage. She went on to compete at five different Olympic Games, representing Venezuela at the 1992, 1996, 2000, 2004, and 2012 Summer Olympics and earning four Olympic diplomas. Among Venezuelan athletes, others who have competed at five Olympics are Fabiola Ramos (1996 through 2012) and Rubén Limardo (2008 through 2024).

After her debut Olympics in Barcelona, Larreal began training and racing in Spain with a road racing team (as non-Spanish cyclists could not compete on the track) sponsored by Café Fortaleza; she won three golds, six silvers, and eight bronzes there. In 1993, she won two silver medals at the 1993 Central American and Caribbean Games, in the sprint and points race. She returned to national competition in 1996, representing Lara and taking gold in the sprint trials. Larreal also had success in the 1996 UCI Track Cycling World Cup Classics, with podium finishes in the stages at Cali and Havana, and an overall placement as world champion in the points race. Her results placed Venezuela 11th of the 328 nations involved. Considered a "top contender" to earn an Olympic medal for Venezuela due to her results, she again had a disappointing Olympic Games in 1996, being eliminated in the same round of the sprint as in 1992 and taking no points in the points race (placing 15th, the highest of the cyclists without points, on ranking). She saw success in more stages of the 1997 UCI Track Cycling World Cup Classics and, at the 1998 Central American and Caribbean Games hosted in Maracaibo, set a new flying 200m championship record of 12.13; as the organisers did not use approved electronic timing devices, times set at the event were not recognised. She won the 200m sprint and took silver in the 500m.

=== 2000s ===
Larreal was the first holder of the Olympic record for women's track time trial, with a time of 35.728 in 2000; she ultimately finished tenth, with four other cyclists achieving a new Olympic record in the event. She picked up her first Olympic diploma in 2000, coming eighth in the sprint. Larreal came to renown across South America in 2001, when she won three gold medals (including the elimination race) at the 2001 Bolivarian Games, with the cycling events taking place in Quito. Ecuadorian newspaper La Hora dubbed her the "queen of speed" for her success and monopolization of attention during the championship. This included setting a new Bolivarian record in the 200m, of 10.905, on 8 September 2001. Larreal again won three gold medals in one championship at the 2002 Central American and Caribbean Games, including defeating main rival Nancy Contreras in the sprint.

In January 2003, Larreal began focused training for the 2004 Olympics at a centre in Switzerland. She had already secured qualification to the Olympics by June 2004, before the Venezuela-hosted 2004 Pan American Cycling Championships which would select the remaining American quota. At the 2004 Olympics she achieved an Olympic diploma. During the classification race for fifth through eighth places of the sprint competition at the 2004 Olympics, Larreal finished behind race winner Natallia Tsylinskaya of Belarus but was also judged to have cycled within the inner lane and impeded Tsylinskaya. Larreal was disqualified and handed automatic eighth place as bottom of the athletes who made it to the quarterfinals. Larreal said the decision was unjust as she did not enter the lane intentionally but had been forced into it to avoid other cyclists. She also reflected that she was proud to be one of the eight best in the world, especially against cyclists with better resources.

Larreal then won four gold medals at the 2005 Bolivarian Games. She had said at the 2004 Olympics that she would not aim for the 2008 Summer Olympics, that as she was already 30 years old she probably only had a year or two of competitive cycling left. She later did aspire to the 2008 Olympics but suffered a broken femur and missed the Games, which again made her consider ending her career; instead she returned to smaller championships in 2009. She said ahead of the 2009 Bolivarian Games that she wanted to break the world record for 200m there, having come close previously.

=== 2010s ===
Larreal's absence from larger American competitions had led to the Cuban Lisandra Guerra becoming dominant in the sprint in 2009, something Guerra reaffirmed after Larreal's return by taking four golds at the 2010 Pan American Cycling Championships, leaving Larreal to win bronze in the sprint (Diana García completed the podium). Later in 2010, Larreal won four golds at the 2010 Central American and Caribbean Games. She then won two golds at the 2011 Pan American Games, setting a new Pan American record for 200m with a time of 10.995 in the qualification round, and successive new Pan American records (with teammate Mariaesthela Vilera) for team sprint in qualification (33.854) and the final (33.611). At the end of 2011, Larreal was awarded the Athlete of the Year Award by the Venezuelan Sports Journalists' Association.

She announced beforehand that she would retire after the 2012 Olympic Games, choosing the Olympics as a stage "to say goodbye to the track." There, she competed in the team and individual sprints, and the keirin, earning two Olympic diplomas. She finished last in her race of the second round of the keirin, not qualifying for the final, and then came third in the classification race for seventh through twelfth places, originally coming ninth overall. In 2016, the Russian cyclist who came eighth was retroactively disqualified for doping, with eighth place and the Olympic diploma reallocated to Larreal in 2020. The 2012 Games was the first time the Olympic women's team sprint was contested; Larreal and Vilera won the first heat in a time of 34.320, meaning they briefly and unofficially held the Olympic record in women's team sprint. The pair ultimately placed seventh.

Having retired after the 2012 Olympics, Larreal returned to competing in early 2014 "out of pure love for her country". The results in sprint cycling from other Venezuelans were of a lower standard and she wanted to inspire another generation of track cyclists. In the three women's track cycling events at the 2014 South American Games, Larreal won two golds and a silver. Speaking to Diario Panorama at the time, she called for the removal of corruption in Venezuelan sport as a way of helping athletes improve. Larreal was preparing to compete at the 2016 Summer Olympics when the Venezuelan Cycling Federation, which was run by the government and which she had criticised for not giving athletes their assigned funding, refused to register her at qualifying events. She then complained about this, which led to threats from officials and the Federation trying to confiscate her passport. On one occasion, when she was driving to visit her father, two trucks tried to force her off the road before she evaded them – her father then told her she had to leave the country.

== Political activism and exile ==
Larreal had openly been a supporter of Hugo Chávez and his political ideology. In 2001 she had criticized his government for only providing support to athletes at the last minute, after it was most necessary, then in 2004 and 2009 she had praised Chávez for heavily investing in sports in Venezuela in the intervening years. Larreal first seriously criticized the Venezuelan government in 2012, under Chávez and then-Minister for Sports Héctor Rodríguez, for irregularities in state funding of sports – at this point, specifically accusing them of sponsoring a motor sport athlete who did not exist in order to take foreign currency out of Venezuela.

After the death of Hugo Chávez in 2013, with Nicolás Maduro inheriting the leadership of Venezuela, Larreal further accused the Ministry of Sports of widespread corruption, saying Maduro treated the department as a source of petty cash and that various officials were implicated in corruption when allocating resources. Her main criticism remained that officials within Venezuelan sport abused their positions to steal federal money, rather than invest in sports, and she continued to call for audits. She later alleged that the Venezuelan government used sports to traffic drugs and dirty money. Larreal was a vocal critic of the presidency of Nicolás Maduro, which she called a dictatorship, and became an activist for democracy. She joined Venezuelan opposition political party Popular Will in 2016; discussing her political affiliation, she said "it's not a secret to anyone that I was chavista, but Chávez is dead".

Her political activism saw Larreal receive death threats in Venezuela and she was forced into exile and banned from entering Venezuela in 2016, seeking political asylum in the United States. At this point, chavista media in Venezuela tried to villainize her, saying that she had used $2 million of sports funding to open two companies in the United States; she had no companies and worked menial jobs. Larreal also stated that the Ministry of Sports had forced other cyclists to formally denounce her, but that her teammates had privately supported her. In the United States, Larreal continued promoting opposition to Maduro. She joined the Vente Venezuela political party in 2018, with other Venezuelan athletes Borman Angulo and Freiber Zerpa. She was still associated with Vente Venezuela at the time of her death, having in August 2024 supported María Corina Machado and posted on social media about the 2024 Venezuelan presidential election, political crisis and protests.

Larreal lived in Miami in 2016, where she drove an Uber, using what she earned to fund her education and send medicine and food packages to her father, though these were often confiscated by the Venezuelan regime. She later worked at a hotel in Las Vegas, with Fox Sports reporting she was a waitress there.

== Death ==
On 12 August 2024, Larreal was declared missing after failing to turn up for work. A friend then asked the police to conduct a welfare check, which they did on the afternoon of 15 August, when she was found dead at her apartment in Las Vegas at the age of 50. A preliminary autopsy said she died of asphyxia after choking on food on 11 August 2024, though "the cause and method" of her death continued being investigated by the Clark County Medical Examiner, and it was later determined that Larreal had died of a stroke. As her mother had died of the same cause many years earlier, and other maternal relatives had, too, her father noted suspicions of a hereditary stroke disorder.

The 2024 Vuelta a España began on 17 August 2024, with Colombian former cyclist Víctor Hugo Peña presenting the tour for ESPN and giving a tribute to Larreal at its opening. Media in Zulia soon reported plans for national tributes, and that her body would be repatriated, though the process of repatriation would be lengthy. When Larreal had bought the plot for her mother at the Cementerio del Este in Caracas, she requested to be buried next to her, which her father said after her death that he planned to ensure. Her body had been repatriated by 29 September 2024, and her funeral took place on 2 October, which would have been her birthday, at the Teo Capriles Velodrome in Caracas. There was an open-casket ceremony at the velodrome's chapel, and a funeral procession and guard of honour carrying her coffin on a lap of the track, before Larreal was interred alongside her mother. During her funeral service, Minister for Sports Arnaldo Sánchez presented the national flag. On 2 April 2025, Larreal was posthumously honoured with the Order of Julio César León, Venezuela's premier recognition for cycling.

== Major results ==
1990
1990 Central American and Caribbean Games

2nd Sprint

1992
1992 Summer Olympics

Individual Sprint, 2nd Repechage Heat 2

1992 Pan American Track Championships

1st Sprint

1993
1993 Central American and Caribbean Games

2nd Sprint
2nd Points race

1996
1996 Summer Olympics

Individual Sprint, 2nd Repechage Heat 2
15th Points Race

1996 UCI Track Cycling World Cup Classics

1st Points race, final individual ranking
2nd Sprint, Round 1, Cali
3rd 500m time trial, Round 1, Cali
3rd Points race, Round 1, Cali
3rd 500m time trial, Round 2, Havana

1997
1997 UCI Track Cycling World Cup Classics

2nd 500m time trial, Round 4, Quartu Sant'Elena
3rd 500m time trial, Round 1, Cali
3rd Points race, Round 3, Fiorenzuola

1997 Pan American Track Championships

1st Sprint
2nd 500m

1998
1998 Central American and Caribbean Games

1st Sprint
2nd 500m time trial
3rd Points race

1999
3rd Venezuelan National Road Race Championships, Road Race
2000
2000 Summer Olympics

8th Individual Sprint
10th Track Time Trial

2001
3rd Venezuelan National Road Race Championships, Road Race
2002
2002 UCI Track Cycling World Cup Classics

3rd Keirin, Round 4, Cali

2002 Central American and Caribbean Games

1st Sprint
1st Keirin
1st Scratch
2nd 500m Time Trial

2nd Venezuelan National Road Race Championships, Road Race
2003
2003 Pan American Games

2nd Sprint
2nd Keirin

2003 UCI Track Cycling World Cup Classics

1st Keirin, Round 3, Cape Town
1st Sprint, final individual ranking
3rd Keirin, final individual ranking

2004
2004 Summer Olympics

8th Individual Sprint

2004 UCI Track Cycling World Cup Classics

3rd Keirin, Round 3, Manchester

2005
2005 Pan American Cycling Championships

1st Keirin

2007
2006–07 UCI Track Cycling World Cup Classics

1st Keirin, Round 3, Los Angeles

2010
2010 Pan American Cycling Championships

2nd Keirin
3rd Sprint

2010 Central American and Caribbean Games

1st Sprint
1st 500m time trial
1st Team sprint (with Angie González)
1st Keirin

2011
2011 Pan American Games

1st Keirin
1st Team sprint (with Mariaesthela Vilera)
2nd Sprint

2011 Pan American Cycling Championships

2nd Team sprint (with Mariaesthela Vilera)
3rd Sprint

2012
2012 Summer Olympics

7th Team Sprint (with Mariaesthela Vilera)
8th Keirin
16th Individual Sprint

2011–12 UCI Track Cycling World Cup

3rd Keirin, Round 3, Beijing

2012 Pan American Cycling Championships

1st Team Sprint (with Mariaesthela Vilera)

2014
2014 South American Games

1st Sprint
1st Team Sprint (with Mariaesthela Vilera)
2nd Keirin

2014 Pan American Track Championships

2nd Team Sprint (with Mariaesthela Vilera)
3rd Keirin
3rd Sprint

2014 Central American and Caribbean Games

2nd Keirin
3rd Team Sprint (with Marynes Prada)
