= Cycling at the 2010 South American Games – Men's 1 kilometre time trial =

The Men's 1 km time trial event at the 2010 South American Games was held on March 21.

== Medalists ==
Gold	Silver	Bronze
Fabián Puerta; Colombia	Jonathan Marín; Colombia	Davi Romeo; Brazil

== Results ==
Rank	Rider	250 m	500 m	750 m	Time
1st place, gold medalist(s)	Fabián Puerta (COL)	19.242 (3)	32.851 (1)	47.605 (1)	1:03.953
2nd place, silver medalist(s)	Jonathan Marín (COL)	19.257 (4)	33.198 (3)	48.118 (2)	1:04.756
3rd place, bronze medalist(s)	Davi Romeo (BRA)	19.239 (2)	33.838 (5)	49.311 (5)	1:05.656
4	Emiliano Fernandez (ARG)	18.683 (1)	33.034 (2)	48.716 (3)	1:05.787
5	Darwin Villa (VEN)	19.369 (5)	33.548 (4)	48.937 (4)	1:06.041
6	Fernando Fermino (BRA)	20.415 (8)	35.084 (8)	50.459 (7)	1:06.792
7	Christopher Almonacid (CHI)	19.689 (7)	35.026 (7)	50.643 (8)	1:06.975
8	Enzo Bruno Farias (CHI)	19.660 (6)	34.519 (6)	50.402 (6)	1:07.389
9	Gabriel Aguiar (URU)	21.595 (9)	37.935 (9)	55.141 (9)	1:13.123
	Edgard Nicolas Palma (URU)	DNS			
