= Cycling at the 2010 Central American and Caribbean Games =

- Venue: Ramey Air Force Base
- Location: (Puerto Rico) Mayagüez
- Dates: 21–29 July

The cycling competition at the 2010 Central American and Caribbean Games was held in Mayagüez, Puerto Rico.

The tournament was held from 21 to 29 July at the Ramey Air Force Base in Aguadilla.

== Medal summary ==
=== Road events ===
Event	Gold		Silver		Bronze	
Men's Road Race	Honorio Machado; Venezuela	3:30:51	Emile Abraham; Trinidad and Tobago	s.t.	Luis Macías; Mexico	s.t.
Men's Time Trial	Tomás Gil; Venezuela	50:04.437	José Chacón Díaz; Venezuela	52:17.617	Henry Raabe; Costa Rica	53:26.878
Women's Road Race	Angie González; Venezuela	3:30:51	Marie Rosado; Puerto Rico	+0:01	Diana García; Colombia	s.t.
Women's Time Trial	Danielys García; Venezuela	27:29.839	Evelyn García; El Salvador	28:23.480	Paola Madriñán; Colombia	28:34.478

=== BMX Events ===
Event	Gold		Silver		Bronze	
Men	Jonathan Suárez; Venezuela	33.598	Augusto Castro; Colombia	33.962	Sergio Salazar; Colombia	34.925
Women	Mariana Pajón; Colombia	37.265	Stefany Hernández; Venezuela	37.921	Stephanie Barragán; Mexico	39.926

=== Mountain events ===
Event	Gold	Silver	Bronze
Men's Cross Country	Ignacio Torres (MEX)	Luis Mejía (COL)	Rafael Escarcega (MEX)
Women's Cross Country	Ángela Parra (COL)	Laura Morfin (MEX)	Viviana Maya (COL)

=== Track events ===
Event	Gold	Silver	Bronze
Men's sprint	Njisane Phillip (TRI)	Hersony Canelón (VEN)	Christian Tamayo (COL)
Men's 1 km time trial	Fabián Puerta (COL)	Ángel Pulgar (VEN)	Leonardo Narváez (COL)
Men's individual pursuit	Juan Esteban Arango (COL)	Edwin Ávila (COL)	Luis Pulido (MEX)
Men's team pursuit	Colombia; Juan Esteban Arango; Edwin Ávila; Arles Castro; Weimar Roldán	Dominican Republic; Norlandy Tavera; Rafael Merán; Augusto Sánchez; Wilmi Gil Santana	Mexico; Rodolfo Garcia; Ignacio Sarabia; Luis Macias; Juan Aldapa
Men's team sprint	Venezuela; César Marcano; Ángel Pulgar; Hersony Canelón	Colombia; Christian Tamayo; Fabián Puerta; Leonardo Narváez	Trinidad and Tobago; Njisane Phillip; Christopher Sellier; Azikiwe Kellar
Men's keirin	Leonardo Narváez (COL)	Hersony Canelón (VEN)	Jose Sochon (GUA)
Men's scratch race	Richard Ochoa (VEN)	Mario Contreras (MEX)	Euris Vidal (DOM)
Men's points race	Augusto Sánchez (DOM)	Richard Ochoa (VEN)	Carlos Ospina (COL)
Men's madison	Colombia; Weimar Roldán; Juan Esteban Arango	Mexico; Luis Macias; Ignacio Sarabia	Dominican Republic; Rafael Merán; Augusto Sánchez
Men's omnium	Juan Esteban Arango (COL)	Jorge Pérez (DOM)	Carlos Linarez (COL)
Women's sprint	Daniela Larreal (VEN)	Diana García (COL)	Juliana Gaviria (COL)
Women's 500m time trial	Daniela Larreal (VEN)	Diana García (COL)	Nancy Contreras (MEX)
Women's individual pursuit	Danielys García (VEN)	María Luisa Calle (COL)	Evelyn García (ESA)
Women's team pursuit	Colombia; María Luisa Calle; Sérika Gulumá; Leidy Muñoz	Mexico; Nancy Arreola; Elizabeth Gonzalez; Jessica Jurado	Dominican Republic; Elaine Domínguez; Ana Gómez; Yaina Beras
Women's team sprint	Venezuela; Angie González; Daniela Larreal	Colombia; Diana García; Juliana Gaviria	Mexico; Nancy Contreras; Daniela Gaxiola
Women's keirin	Daniela Larreal (VEN)	Diana García (COL)	Nancy Contreras (MEX)
Women's scratch race	Diana García (COL)	Angie González (VEN)	Sofía Arreola (MEX)
Women's points race	Danielys García (VEN)	Sérika Gulumá (COL)	Sofía Arreola (MEX)
Women's omnium	Angie González (VEN)	Sérika Gulumá (COL)	Jessica Jurado (MEX)
