= Anthony Sellier =

Trinidad and Tobago cyclist

Personal information
- Born: 13 November 1950 (age 75)

Cycling career
- Sport: Cycling

Anthony Sellier (born 13 November 1950) is a Trinidad former cyclist. He competed at the 1972 Summer Olympics and the 1976 Summer Olympics.

His son Christopher Sellier was also an international track cyclist.
