= Fabián Puerta =

Colombian cyclist (born 1991)

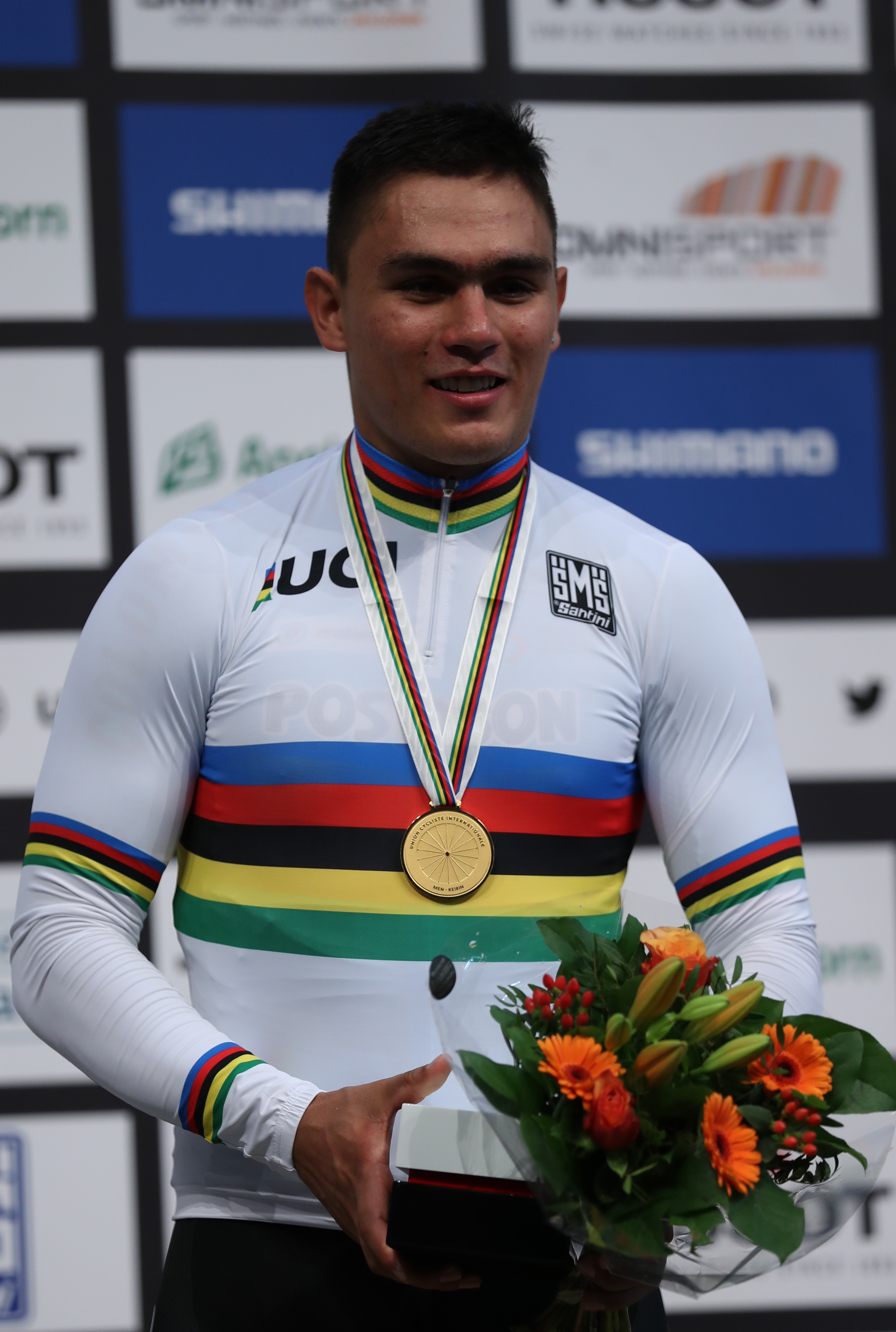
- Puerta in 2018

Personal information
- Full name: Fabián Hernando Puerta Zapata
- Nickname: "Chispas"
- Born: 12 July 1991 (age 35) Caldas, Antioquia, Colombia
- Height: 1.82 m (6 ft 0 in)
- Weight: 90 kg (198 lb)

Cycling career
- Sport: Cycling
- Current team: Colombia
- Discipline: Track cycling
- Role: Rider
- Rider type: Sprinter
Medal record
Representing Colombia
Men's track cycling
Event	1st	2nd	3rd
World Championships	1	2	0
World Cup	3	0	1
World Cup stage	5	3	3
Pan American Games	2	1	1
Pan American Championships	15	3	2
CAC Games	5	3	1
South American Games	7	3	0
Bolivarian Games	8	2	0
Total	46	17	8
World Championships
Gold medal – first place	2018 Apeldoorn	Keirin
Silver medal – second place	2014 Cali	Keirin
Silver medal – second place	2017 Hong Kong	Keirin
World Cup
Gold medal – first place	2012-13	1 km time trial
Gold medal – first place	2014-15	Keirin
Gold medal – first place	2014-15	Sprint
Bronze medal – third place	2012-13	Keirin
Pan American Games
Gold medal – first place	2011 Guadalajara	Keirin
Gold medal – first place	2015 Toronto	Keirin
Silver medal – second place	2011 Guadalajara	Sprint
Bronze medal – third place	2011 Guadalajara	Team sprint
Pan American Championships
Gold medal – first place	2010 Aguascalientes	Team sprint
Gold medal – first place	2011 Medellín	Keirin
Gold medal – first place	2011 Medellín	Team sprint
Gold medal – first place	2012 Mar del Plata	Keirin
Gold medal – first place	2013 Mexico City	Keirin
Gold medal – first place	2013 Mexico City	1 km time trial
Gold medal – first place	2014 Aguascalientes	Keirin
Gold medal – first place	2015 Santiago	Keirin
Gold medal – first place	2015 Santiago	Sprint
Gold medal – first place	2016 Aguascalientes	Keirin
Gold medal – first place	2016 Aguascalientes	Sprint
Gold medal – first place	2016 Aguascalientes	Team sprint
Gold medal – first place	2017 Couva	Keirin
Gold medal – first place	2017 Couva	1 km time trial
Gold medal – first place	2017 Couva	Team sprint
Silver medal – second place	2014 Aguascalientes	Sprint
Silver medal – second place	2014 Aguascalientes	Team sprint
Silver medal – second place	2017 Couva	Sprint
Bronze medal – third place	2011 Medellín	1 km time trial
Bronze medal – third place	2012 Mar del Plata	Sprint
Central American and Caribbean Games
Gold medal – first place	2010 Mayagüez	1 km time trial
Gold medal – first place	2014 Veracruz	Keirin
Gold medal – first place	2014 Veracruz	Sprint
Gold medal – first place	2014 Veracruz	1 km time trial
Gold medal – first place	2018 Barranquilla	Keirin
Silver medal – second place	2010 Mayagüez	Team sprint
Silver medal – second place	2014 Veracruz	Team sprint
Silver medal – second place	2018 Barranquilla	Sprint
Bronze medal – third place	2018 Barranquilla	Team sprint
South American Games
Gold medal – first place	2010 Medellín	1 km time trial
Gold medal – first place	2010 Medellín	Team sprint
Gold medal – first place	2014 Santiago	Keirin
Gold medal – first place	2014 Santiago	Sprint
Gold medal – first place	2018 Cochabamba	Sprint
Gold medal – first place	2018 Cochabamba	Team sprint
Gold medal – first place	2022 Asunción	Keirin
Silver medal – second place	2014 Santiago	Team sprint
Silver medal – second place	2018 Cochabamba	Keirin
Silver medal – second place	2022 Asunción	Sprint
Bolivarian Games
Gold medal – first place	2009 Sucre	Team sprint
Gold medal – first place	2013 Trujillo	Keirin
Gold medal – first place	2013 Trujillo	Sprint
Gold medal – first place	2013 Trujillo	1 km time trial
Gold medal – first place	2017 Santa Marta	Keirin
Gold medal – first place	2017 Santa Marta	Sprint
Gold medal – first place	2017 Santa Marta	1 km time trial
Gold medal – first place	2017 Santa Marta	Team sprint
Silver medal – second place	2009 Sucre	1 km time trial
Silver medal – second place	2013 Trujillo	Team sprint

Fabian Hernando Puerta Zapata (born 12 July 1991) is a Colombian track cyclist. He competed in keirin at the 2012 Summer Olympics in London and in keirin at the 2011 Pan American Games where he won a gold medal. He is married to fellow track cyclist Juliana Gaviria, and is brother in law to former track World Champion and Giro D'Italia points classification winner Fernando Gaviria.

== Sanctions ==
On 14 August 2018 the Union Cycliste Internationale announced that it had notified Fabian Hernando Puerta Zapata of an Adverse Analytical Finding (AAF) of boldenone in a sample collected in the scope of an out-of-competition control on 11 June 2018. In accordance with UCI Anti-Doping Rules, Puerta was provisionally suspended until the adjudication of the affair. On 29 August 2019 the UCI announced a four-year Anti-Doping Rule Violation (ADRV) of Fabian Hernando Puerta Zapata. The ADRV Date was 11 June 2018, and the period of ineligibility is until 12 August 2022.

== Major results ==
2010
Central American and Caribbean Games

1st 1 km time trial
2nd Team sprint

Pan American Road and Track Championships

1st team sprint

2011
Pan American Games

1st Keirin
2nd Sprint
3rd Team sprint

2012
Pan American Road and Track Championships

1st Keirin
3rd Sprint

Track Cycling World Cup

1st 1 km time trial, Round 1, Cali
1st Keirin, Round 1, Cali
2nd Sprint, Round 1, Cali

2013
Pan American Road and Track Championships

1st Keirin
1st 1 km time trial
2nd Flying lap

Copa Cobernador de Carabobo

1st Sprint
1st Keirin
