= Luis Mansilla =

Chilean cyclist (born 1986)

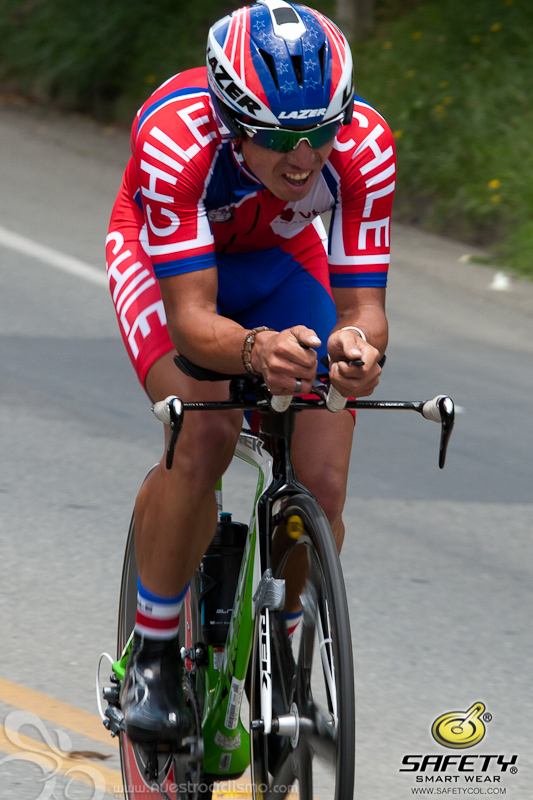

Personal information
- Full name: Luis Miguel Mansilla Almonacid
- Born: 26 July 1986 (age 40) Puerto Natales, Chile
- Height: 1.75 m (5 ft 9 in)
- Weight: 68 kg (150 lb)

Cycling career
- Sport: Cycling
- Disciplines: Road and track
- Role: Rider
- Rider type: All-rounder (road); Endurance (track)

Professional team
- 2014: PinoRoad
Medal record
Men's track cycling
Representing Chile
Pan American Games
Silver medal – second place	2011 Guadalajara	Omnium
Pan American Championships
Gold medal – first place	2007 Valencia	Scratch
Gold medal – first place	2011 Medellin	Omnium
Gold medal – first place	2014 Aguascalientes	Points race
Silver medal – second place	2008 Montevideo	Scratch
Silver medal – second place	2008 Montevideo	Team pursuit
Silver medal – second place	2009 Mexico City	Team pursuit
Silver medal – second place	2010 Aguascalientes	Team pursuit
Silver medal – second place	2011 Medellin	Team pursuit
Silver medal – second place	2014 Aguascalientes	Scratch
Bronze medal – third place	2010 Aguascalientes	Omnium
Bronze medal – third place	2010 Aguascalientes	Scratch

Luis Miguel Mansilla Almonacid (born 26 July 1986, Puerto Natales,) is a Chilean track and road cyclist. At the 2012 Summer Olympics, he competed in the omnium.

== Major results ==
2006
1st Stages 4b & 5 Vuelta de Chile
2009
3rd Overall Tour do Rio

1st Stage 3

2010
1st Stage 6 Tour de San Juan
2011
1st Stages 1 (TTT), 3 & 5 Vuelta de Chile
7th Time trial, Pan American Road Championships
10th Overall Tour de San Luis
2012
1st Stages 1 (TTT), 3 & 6 Vuelta de Chile
7th Overall Tour de San Luis
