= 2011 UCI Track Cycling World Championships – Men's points race =

Rainbow jersey

The Men's points race at the 2011 UCI Track Cycling World Championships was held on March 25. 18 athletes participated in the contest. The distance was 160 laps (40 km) with 10 sprints.

== Results ==
The race was held at 19:15.

Rank	Name	Nation	Sprint points	Lap points	Total points
1st place, gold medalist(s)	Edwin Ávila	Colombia	13	20	33
2nd place, silver medalist(s)	Cameron Meyer	Australia	25	0	25
3rd place, bronze medalist(s)	Morgan Kneisky	France	23	0	23
4	Alexander Khatuntsev	Russia	20	0	20
5	Milan Kadlec	Czech Republic	17	0	17
6	Peter Schep	Netherlands	13	0	13
7	Gerardo Fernández	Argentina	8	0	8
8	Silvan Dillier	Switzerland	8	0	8
9	Polychronis Tzortzakis	Greece	7	0	7
10	Choi Ki Ho	Hong Kong	6	0	6
11	Sergiy Lagkuti	Ukraine	6	0	6
12	Berik Kupeshov	Kazakhstan	5	0	5
13	Omar Bertazzo	Italy	4	0	4
14	Roman Dronin	Uzbekistan	3	0	3
15	Franz Schiewer	Germany	2	0	2
16	Ingmar De Poortere	Belgium	2	0	2
17	Luis Fernando Sepúlveda	Chile	1	0	1
–	Thomas Scully	New Zealand	13	−20	DNF
