= Christian Tamayo =

Colombian cyclist (born 1991)

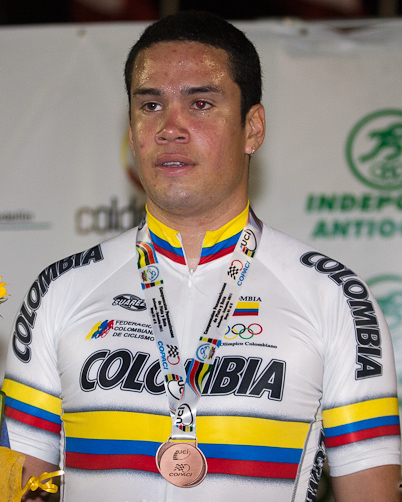
- Tamayo in 2011

Personal information
- Full name: Christian Leandro Tamayo Saavedra
- Born: 21 March 1991 (age 35)

Cycling career
- Sport: Cycling
- Current team: Team Medellín–EPM
- Disciplines: Track; Road
- Role: Rider
- Rider type: Sprinter

Amateur teams
- 2013: Supergiros–Aguardiente Blanco del Valle
- 2015: Redetrans–Supergiro
- 2016: Supergiros–Indervalle–Dar Salud–Re
- 2016: Team Arroz Sonora–Dimonex
- 2017: EBSA–Indeportes Boyacá
- 2021: Tolima es pasión–Sheffy
- 2023: Supergiros–Alcaldía de Manizales

Professional teams
- 2014: InCycle–Predator Components
- 2018: GW–Shimano
- 2024–: Team Medellín–EPM
Medal record
Representing Colombia
Men's track cycling
Event	1st	2nd	3rd
World Junior Championships	0	0	1
Pan American Games	0	0	1
Pan American Championships	2	0	1
CAC Games	0	1	1
South American Games	2	1	0
Bolivarian Games	1	0	1
Total	5	2	5
Pan American Games
Bronze medal – third place	2011 Guadalajara	Team sprint
Pan American Championships
Gold medal – first place	2010 Aguascalientes	Team sprint
Gold medal – first place	2011 Medellín	Team sprint
Bronze medal – third place	2011 Medellín	Keirin
Central American and Caribbean Games
Silver medal – second place	2010 Mayagüez	Team sprint
Bronze medal – third place	2010 Mayagüez	Sprint
South American Games
Gold medal – first place	2010 Medellín	Sprint
Gold medal – first place	2010 Medellín	Team sprint
Silver medal – second place	2010 Medellín	Keirin
Bolivarian Games
Gold medal – first place	2009 Sucre	Keirin
Bronze medal – third place	2009 Sucre	1 km time trial
World Junior Championships
Bronze medal – third place	2009 Moscow	Sprint

Christian Leandro Tamayo Saavedra (born 21 March 1991) is a Colombian road and track cyclist, who currently rides for UCI Continental team Team Medellín–EPM. He competed in the sprint and team sprint event at the 2011 UCI Track Cycling World Championships.

== Major results ==
=== Road ===
2009
2nd Road race, National Junior Championships
2013
1st Stage 3 Clásica Ciudad de Girardot
2014
1st Stages 2 & 5 Clásico RCN
2015
1st Stage 4 Vuelta al Valle del Cauca
2017
1st Stage 3 Clásica Ciudad de Girardot
1st Stages 4 & 10 Vuelta a Chiriquí
2023
1st Stage 1 Vuelta al Valle del Cauca
2024
1st Stage 2 Jamaica International Cycling Classic
