= Edwin Ávila =

Colombian racing cyclist

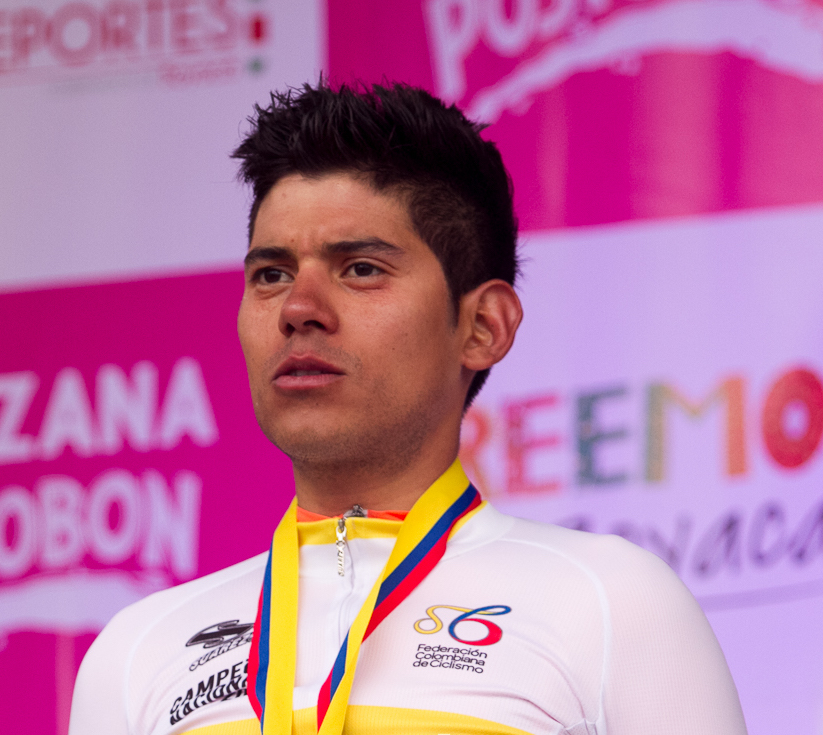
- Ávila in 2016

Personal information
- Full name: Edwin Alcibiades Ávila Vanegas
- Nickname: "Calimenio"
- Born: 21 November 1989 (age 36) Cali, Colombia
- Height: 1.67 m (5 ft 6 in)
- Weight: 63 kg (139 lb)

Cycling career
- Sport: Cycling
- Current team: Burgos Burpellet BH
- Disciplines: Road cycling; Track cycling
- Role: Rider
- Rider type: Puncheur

Professional teams
- 2013–2015: Colombia
- 2016–2017: Team Illuminate
- 2018–2019: Israel Cycling Academy
- 2020: Israel Cycling Academy
- 2021–: Burgos BH

Major wins
- Single-day races and Classics National Road Race Championships (2016)
Medal record
Representing Colombia
Men's track cycling
Event	1st	2nd	3rd
World Championships	2	0	0
World Junior Championships	0	0	1
World Cup	0	1	0
World Cup stage	2	1	3
Pan American Games	1	0	0
Pan American Championships	4	1	2
CAC Games	2	2	1
South American Games	2	1	0
Total	13	6	7
World Championships
Gold medal – first place	2011 Apeldoorn	Points race
Gold medal – first place	2014 Cali	Points race
World Cup
Silver medal – second place	2011–12	Points race
Pan American Games
Gold medal – first place	2011 Guadalajara	Team pursuit
Pan American Championships
Gold medal – first place	2008 Montevideo	Team pursuit
Gold medal – first place	2010 Aguascalientes	Team pursuit
Gold medal – first place	2011 Medellín	Points race
Gold medal – first place	2011 Medellín	Team pursuit
Silver medal – second place	2011 Medellín	Madison
Bronze medal – third place	2017 Couva	Points race
Bronze medal – third place	2017 Couva	Madison
Central American and Caribbean Games
Gold medal – first place	2010 Mayagüez	Team pursuit
Gold medal – first place	2018 Barranquilla	Omnium
Silver medal – second place	2010 Mayagüez	Individual pursuit
Silver medal – second place	2018 Barranquilla	Madison
Bronze medal – third place	2018 Barranquilla	Team pursuit
South American Games
Gold medal – first place	2010 Medellín	Team pursuit
Gold medal – first place	2014 Santiago	Team pursuit
Silver medal – second place	2010 Medellín	Points race
World Junior Championships
Bronze medal – third place	2007 Aguascalientes	Madison

Edwin Alcibiades Ávila Vanegas (born 21 November 1989 in Cali) is a Colombian road and track cyclist, who currently rides for UCI ProTeam Burgos Burpellet BH. At the 2012 Summer Olympics, he competed in the Men's team pursuit for the national team. He won the Colombian National Road Race Championships in 2016.

== Major results ==
=== Track ===
2007
3rd Madison (with Jaime Ramírez), UCI Junior World Championships
2008
3rd Team pursuit (Cali), UCI World Cup
2010
Central American and Caribbean Games

1st Team pursuit
2nd Individual pursuit

2nd Team pursuit (Cali), UCI World Cup
2011
1st Points race, UCI World Championships
1st Points race, UCI World Ranking
1st Team pursuit, Pan American Games
3rd Points race (Cali), UCI World Cup
2012
1st Team pursuit (Cali), UCI World Cup
2014
1st Points race, UCI World Championships

=== Road racing ===
2010
1st Circuito Feria de Manizales
5th Road race, Central American and Caribbean Games
2012
1st Overall Tour of Trinidad and Tobago
1st Sprints classification Tour de San Luis
2014
7th Grand Prix de Denain
2015
10th Route Adélie
2016
1st Road race, National Road Championships
2017
Tour d'Azerbaïdjan

1st Points classification
1st Stage 4

1st Stage 1 Sibiu Tour
2nd Overall Tour de Taiwan

1st Points classification
1st Stages 1 & 4

2nd Overall Tour de Korea

1st Points classification

5th Winston-Salem Cycling Classic
2018
4th Overall Tour de Taiwan

1st Points classification
1st Stage 3

2019
1st Overall GP Beiras e Serra da Estrela

1st Stage 1

1st Stage 4 Tour du Rwanda
4th Grand Prix de Fourmies
8th Coppa Bernocchi
2020
9th Overall Bałtyk–Karkonosze Tour

==== Grand Tour general classification results timeline ====
Grand Tour	2013	2014
Giro d'Italia	164	DNF
Tour de France	—	—
Vuelta a España	—	—

Legend
—	Did not compete
DNF	Did not finish
