= Dean Tracy =

American track cyclist (born 1985)

Personal information
- Born: January 14, 1985 (age 41)

Cycling career
- Sport: Cycling
- Discipline: Track cycling
- Role: Rider
- Rider type: team sprint
Medal record
Men's track cycling
Representing the United States
Pan American Games
Silver medal – second place	2011 Guadalajara	Team sprint
Pan American Championships
Silver medal – second place	2011 Medellin	Team sprint

Dean Tracy (born January 14, 1985) is an American male track cyclist, riding for the national team. He competed in the team sprint event at the 2011 UCI Track Cycling World Championships.
