= Mariaesthela Vilera =

Venezuelan cyclist

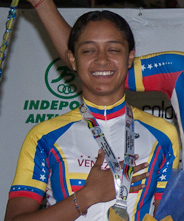

Personal information
- Born: 26 December 1988 (age 37)

Cycling career
- Sport: Cycling
- Discipline: Track
- Role: Rider
- Rider type: Sprinter
Medal record
Representing Venezuela
Women's track cycling
Pan American Games
Gold medal – first place	2011 Guadalajara	Team sprint
Pan American Championships
Gold medal – first place	2012 Mar del Plata	Team sprint
Silver medal – second place	2011 Medellin	Team sprint
Silver medal – second place	2014 Aguascalientes	Team sprint
Bronze medal – third place	2013 Mexico City	Keirin
Bronze medal – third place	2014 Aguascalientes	500m time trial
Bronze medal – third place	2017 Couva	Team sprint

Mariaesthela Vilera (born 26 December 1988 in Valle de la Pascua) is a Venezuelan track cyclist. At the 2012 Summer Olympics, she competed in the Women's team sprint for the national team.

She also competed at the 2015 Pan American Games.

== Career results ==
2014
1st Team Sprint, South American Games (with Daniela Larreal)
Pan American Track Championships

2nd Team Sprint (with Daniela Larreal)
3rd 500m Time Trial

2nd Keirin, Sprintermeeting
3rd Sprint, Prova Internacional de Anadia
2016
2nd Sprint, Copa Venezuela
