= Weimar Roldán =

Colombian racing cyclist

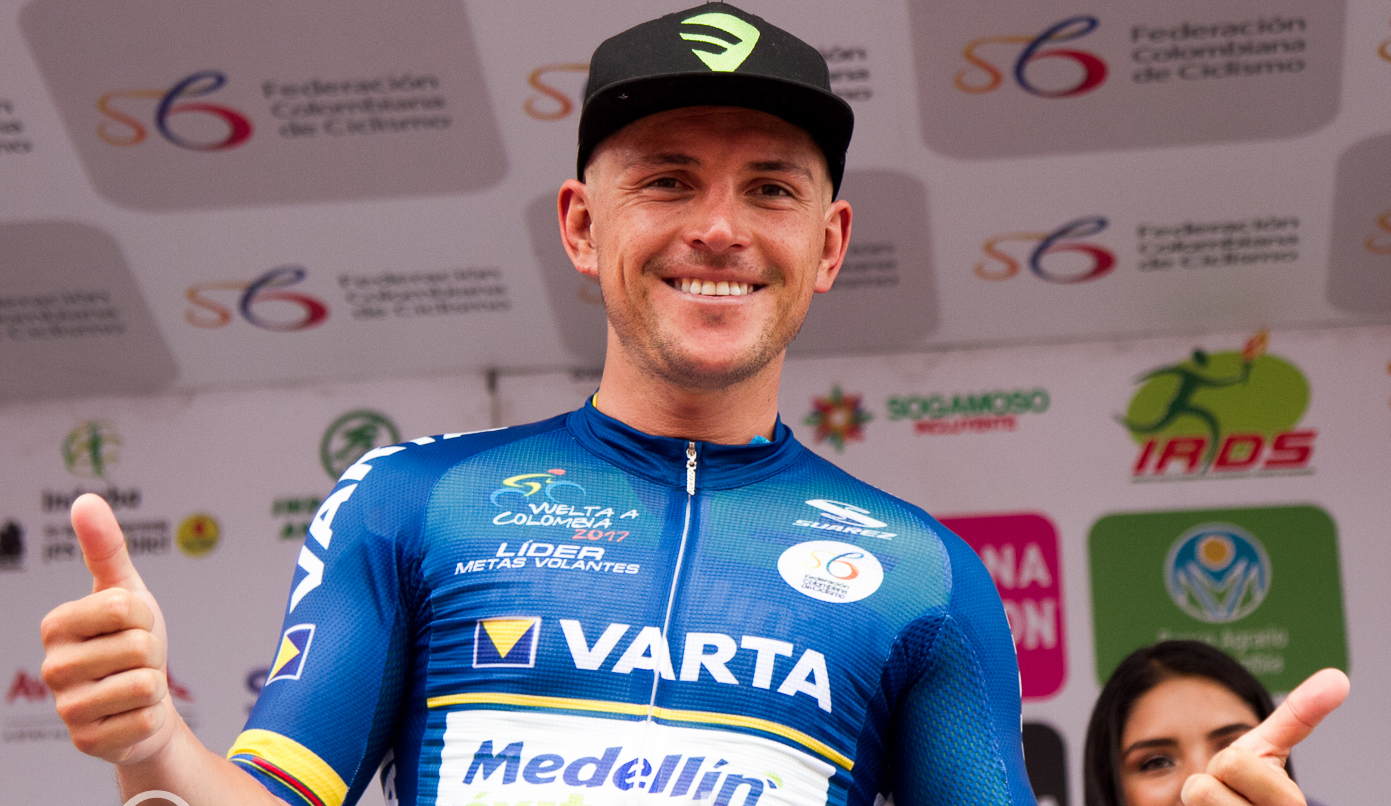
- Roldán in 2017

Personal information
- Full name: Weimar Alfonso Roldán Ortíz
- Born: 17 May 1985 (age 41)

Cycling career
- Sport: Cycling
- Current team: Team Medellín–EPM
- Disciplines: Road; Track
- Role: Rider

Amateur teams
- 2007–2012: GW–Shimano
- 2014: EPM–UNE–Área Metropolitana

Professional teams
- 2013: EPM–UNE
- 2015–2016: EPM–UNE–Área Metropolitana
- 2017–: Medellín–Inder
Medal record
Representing Colombia
Men's track cycling
Pan American Games
Gold medal – first place	2011 Guadalajara	Team pursuit
Pan American Championships
Gold medal – first place	2008 Montevideo	Team pursuit
Gold medal – first place	2010 Aguascalientes	Madison
Gold medal – first place	2010 Aguascalientes	Points race
Gold medal – first place	2010 Aguascalientes	Team pursuit
Gold medal – first place	2011 Medellin	Team pursuit
Silver medal – second place	2011 Medellin	Madison
Men's road bicycle racing
Pan American Championships
Gold medal – first place	2005 Mar del Plata	Under-23 time trial

Weimar Alfonso Roldán Ortíz (born 17 May 1985 in Medellín) is a Colombian professional road and track cyclist, who currently rides for UCI Continental team Team Medellín–EPM.

== Major results ==
2005
1st Time trial, Pan American Under-23 Road Championships
2006
1st Stage 6 Vuelta a Colombia Sub-23
1st Stage 1 Clasica de Guarné
2007
9th Time trial, Pan American Road Championships
2008
1st Prologue Vuelta al Valle del Cauca
1st Stage 3 Clasica del Meta
1st Stage 1 Clásica Nacional Marco Fidel Suárez
2009
1st Stage 5 Vuelta del Huila
1st Prologue (TTT) Vuelta a Colombia
1st Stage 11 Vuelta a Venezuela
1st Stage 3 Clásica Nacional Marco Fidel Suárez
Gran Caracol de Pista

1st Stages 8 & 9

1st Team pursuit, 2009–10 UCI Track Cycling World Cup Classics, Cali (with Juan Arango, Edwin Ávila and Arles Castro)
2010
Central American and Caribbean Games

1st Team pursuit (with Juan Arango, Edwin Ávila and Arles Castro)
1st Madison (with Juan Arango)

1st Prologue (TTT) Vuelta al Valle del Cauca
Clásico RCN

1st Sprints classification
1st Stage 1 (TTT)

1st Stage 1 Clasico El Colombiano
2nd Team pursuit, 2010–11 UCI Track Cycling World Cup Classics, Cali (with Juan Arango, Edwin Ávila and Arles Castro)
3rd Overall Clásica Rionegro con Futuro-Aguas de Rionegro

1st Stage 1

2011
1st Road race, National Road Championships
1st Team pursuit, Pan American Games (with Juan Arango, Edwin Ávila and Arles Castro)
1st Madison, 2011–12 UCI Track Cycling World Cup, Cali (with Juan Arango)
1st Stage 2 Clásica Rionegro con Futuro-Aguas de Rionegro
2012
1st Team pursuit, 2012–13 UCI Track Cycling World Cup, Cali (with Juan Arango, Edwin Ávila and Arles Castro)
1st Stage 5 Clásica Nacional Marco Fidel Suárez
1st Stage 1 Clasico El Colombiano
2013
1st Stage 3 Clásica Rionegro con Futuro-Aguas de Rionegro
1st Stage 1 Clásica Nacional Ciudad de Anapoima
1st Stage 1 Tour do Rio
4th Overall Vuelta al Valle del Cauca
2014
Vuelta a Colombia

1st Stages 1 (TTT) & 3

5th Road race, Pan American Road Championships
2015
1st Stage 1 (TTT) Vuelta a Colombia
Tour do Rio

1st Points classification
1st Stage 3

2016
1st Team time trial, National Road Championships
2017
1st Stage 1 Vuelta a Asturias
10th Overall Tour of Ankara
2018
7th Winston-Salem Cycling Classic
2019
1st Stage 1 (TTT) Tour of Qinghai Lake
