= Rubén Companioni =

Cuban bicycle racer (born 1990)

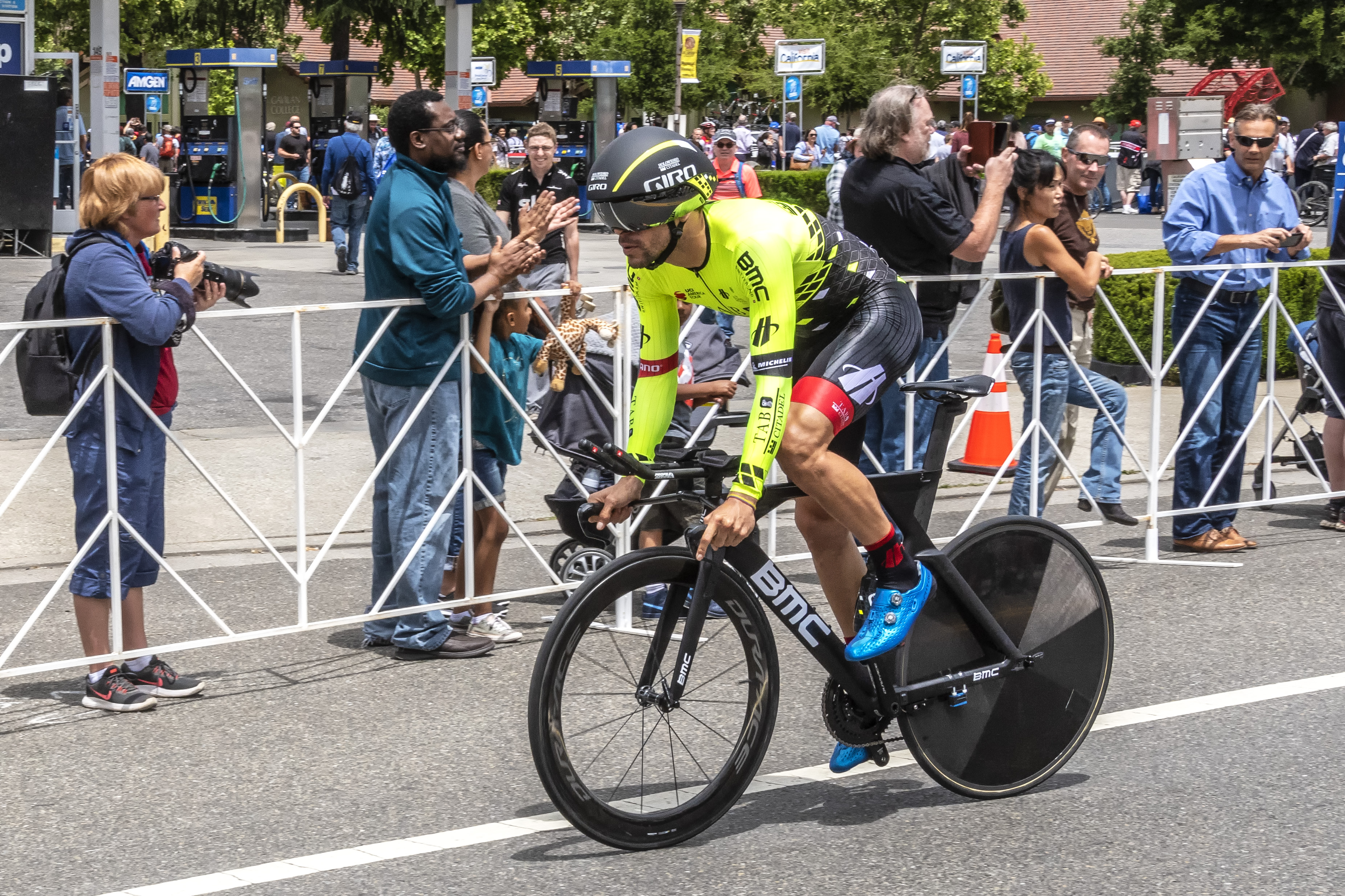
- Companioni in 2018

Personal information
- Full name: Rubén Companioni Blanco
- Born: 18 May 1990 (age 36) Ciego de Avila, Cuba
- Height: 5 ft 10 in (178 cm)
- Weight: 150 lb (68 kg)

Cycling career
- Sport: Cycling
- Current team: City Bikes Miami
- Discipline: Road
- Role: Rider

Amateur teams
- 2021–2022: Best Buddies Racing
- 2024–: City Bikes Miami

Professional teams
- 2013: Jamis–Hagens Berman
- 2016: Team Jamis
- 2017–2018: Holowesko Citadel Racing Team
- 2023: Miami Blazers

Rubén Companioni Blanco (born 18 May 1990) is a Cuban professional cyclist, who currently rides for club team City Bikes Miami.

== Major results ==
2009
Pan American Track Championships

1st Omnium
3rd Team pursuit

2010
Pan American Track Championships

2nd Omnium
3rd Team pursuit

10th Overall Vuelta a Cuba
2011
1st Stage 3 Vuelta a Costa Rica
2012
1st Stage 4 Green Mountain Stage Race
2013
1st Madeira Criterium
2014
3rd Clarendon Cup
2015
1st Florida State Criterium Championships
2nd Athens Twilight Criterium
2016
1st Stage 1 Redlands Bicycle Classic
2017
5th Overall Tour de Beauce
2018
1st Overall Joe Martin Stage Race

1st Stage 1

3rd Sunny King Criterium
2021
1st Florida State Criterium Championships
2022
1st Florida State Criterium Championships
2023
1st Stage 2 Vuelta a la Independencia Nacional
2024
1st Florida State Criterium Championships
1st Clasica Puerto Rico - Choli Crit
2025
1st Florida State Criterium Championships
1st Stage 4 Vuelta a la Independencia Nacional
