= Christopher Sellier =

Trinidad and Tobago cyclist

Personal information
- Born: 24 February 1986 (age 40)

Cycling career
- Sport: Cycling
- Discipline: Track cycling
- Role: Rider
- Rider type: sprinter

Christopher Sellier (born 24 February 1986) is a Trinidad and Tobago male track cyclist, and part of the national team. He was allowed to start in the team sprint event at the 2009 UCI Track Cycling World Championships, but the team did not start.

He is the son of Olympic track cyclist Anthony Sellier.
