= Jonathan Marín =

Colombian cyclist (born 1982)

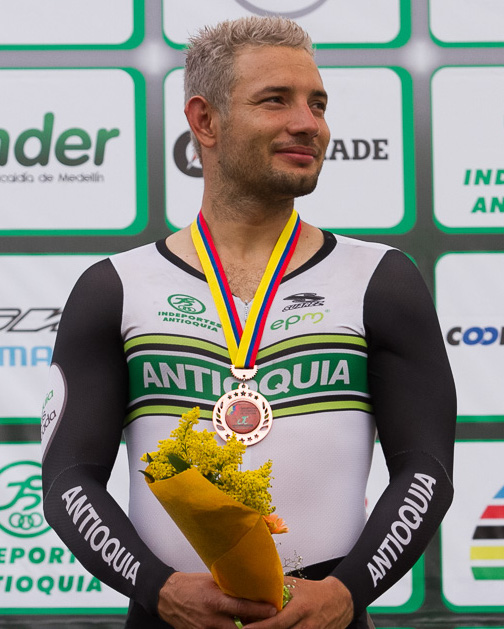

Personal information
- Full name: Jonathan Marín Cermeño
- Born: 10 December 1982 (age 43)

Cycling career
- Sport: Cycling
- Discipline: Track cycling
- Role: Rider
- Rider type: sprinter
Medal record
Men's track cycling
Representing Colombia
Pan American Games
| Silver medal – second place | 2003 Santo Domingo | Team sprint |
| Bronze medal – third place | 2011 Guadalajara | Team sprint |
Pan American Championships
| Gold medal – first place | 2008 Montevideo | Sprint |
| Gold medal – first place | 2009 Mexico City | Keirin |
| Gold medal – first place | 2009 Mexico City | Team sprint |
| Gold medal – first place | 2011 Medellin | Team sprint |
Central American and Caribbean Games
| Gold medal – first place | 2002 San Salvador | Sprint |
| Silver medal – second place | 2002 San Salvador | Team Sprint |
| Silver medal – second place | 2002 San Salvador | Keirin |

Jonathan Marín Cermeño (born 10 December 1982) is a Colombian male track cyclist. He competed in the sprint and keirin event at the 2012 UCI Track Cycling World Championships.
