= Gonzalo Figueroa =

Argentine footballer

Personal information
- Full name: Gonzalo Gabriel Figueroa
- Date of birth: 10 April 2000 (age 26)
- Place of birth: Salta, Argentina
- Height: 1.83 m (6 ft 0 in)
- Position: Forward

Team information
- Current team: Deportes La Serena (on loan from Deportivo Armenio)
- Number: 2

Youth career
- 2015–2020: Racing de Córdoba

Senior career*
Years	Team	Apps	(Gls)
2019–2020	Racing de Córdoba	–	(–)
2020–2022	Luz y Fuerza (futsal)	–	(–)
2023	C.A.I.	–	(–)
2024	Villa Dálmine	8	(0)
2025	C.A.I.	3	(1)
2025	Sol de Mayo	11	(3)
2025–	Deportivo Armenio	49	(15)
2026–	→ Deportes La Serena (loan)	1	(2)
- * Club domestic league appearances and goals as of 27 July 2026

Gonzalo Gabriel Figueroa (born 10 April 2000) is an Argentine footballer who plays as a forward for Chilean Primera División club Deportes La Serena on loan from Deportivo Armenio.

== Career ==
Born in Salta, Argentina, Figueroa was trained and started his career with Racing de Córdoba. Becoming a first team member, he could not make his professional debut with them.

From 2020, Figueroa spent 3 years playing futsal for Luz y Fuerza from Río Grande, and returned to football with Comisión de Actividades Infantiles (C.A.I.) in 2023.

After playing for Villa Dálmine in 2024 and C.A.I. and Sol de Mayo in 2025, Figueroa joined Deportivo Armenio in July 2025.

After standing out with Deportivo Armenio in 2026, Figueroa moved to Chile in the second half of the year and joined Deportes La Serena in the top division on a loan for 18 months with a purchase option. He scored two goals in his debut in the 3–3 away draw against Universidad Católica on 26 July.
