= Jacob Schwingboth =

Canadian cyclist

Personal information
- Born: 4 September 1991 (age 35) New Westminster, British Columbia, Canada
- Height: 5 ft 9 in (1.75 m)
- Weight: 65 kg (143 lb; 10.2 st)

Cycling career
- Sport: Cycling
- Disciplines: Road and Track
- Role: Rider

Professional team
- 2015: H&R Block Pro Cycling

Jacob Schwingboth (born 4 September 1991) is a Canadian road bicycle racer and was with the H&R Block Pro Cycling team. In 2012, he won the BC Provincial Road Race.
