= Diana García (cyclist) =

Colombian track cyclist

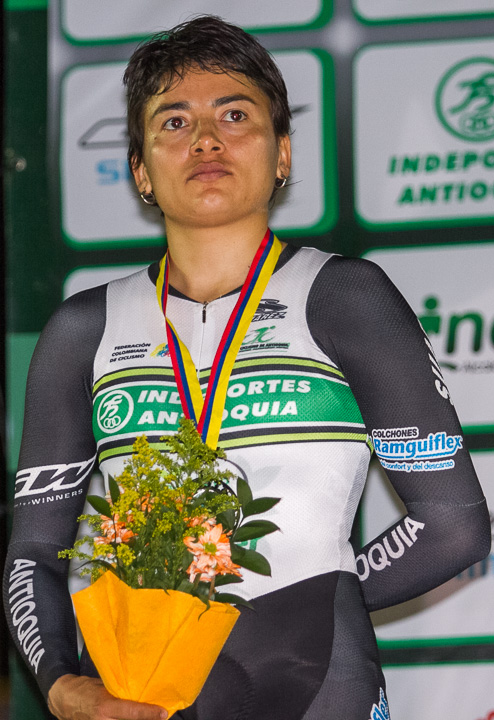
- García in 2013

Personal information
- Full name: Diana María García Orrego
- Born: 17 March 1982 (age 44) Barbosa, Antioquia, Colombia
Medal record
Representing Colombia
Women's track cycling
Pan American Games
Gold medal – first place	2007 Rio de Janeiro	Sprint
Silver medal – second place	2011 Guadalajara	Team sprint
Bronze medal – third place	2011 Guadalajara	Sprint
Bronze medal – third place	2015 Toronto	Team sprint
Pan American Championships
Gold medal – first place	2004 Cojedes	Keirin
Gold medal – first place	2005 Mar del Plata	Sprint
Gold medal – first place	2006 São Paulo	Sprint
Gold medal – first place	2008 Montevideo	500m time trial
Gold medal – first place	2008 Montevideo	Keirin
Gold medal – first place	2008 Montevideo	Sprint
Gold medal – first place	2008 Montevideo	Team sprint
Gold medal – first place	2009 Mexico City	Team sprint
Gold medal – first place	2011 Medellin	Team sprint
Gold medal – first place	2014 Aguascalientes	Team sprint
Silver medal – second place	2007 Valencia	500m time trial
Silver medal – second place	2009 Mexico City	500m time trial
Silver medal – second place	2009 Mexico City	Keirin
Silver medal – second place	2009 Mexico City	Sprint
Silver medal – second place	2010 Aguascalientes	Sprint
Silver medal – second place	2010 Aguascalientes	Team sprint
Bronze medal – third place	2002 Quito	500m time trial
Bronze medal – third place	2002 Quito	Keirin
Bronze medal – third place	2002 Quito	Sprint
Bronze medal – third place	2004 Cojedes	500m time trial
Bronze medal – third place	2004 Cojedes	Sprint
Bronze medal – third place	2005 Mar del Plata	Keirin
Bronze medal – third place	2006 São Paulo	500m time trial
Bronze medal – third place	2006 São Paulo	Keirin
Bronze medal – third place	2007 Valencia	Sprint
Bronze medal – third place	2010 Aguascalientes	Keirin
Bronze medal – third place	2012 Mar del Plata	Team sprint
Bronze medal – third place	2019 Cochabamba	Team sprint
Central American and Caribbean Games
Gold medal – first place	2006 Cartagena	500m Time Trial
Gold medal – first place	2010 Mayagüez	Scratch
Silver medal – second place	2002 San Salvador	Keirin
Silver medal – second place	2006 Cartagena	Sprint
Silver medal – second place	2006 Cartagena	Keirin
Silver medal – second place	2010 Mayagüez	500m Time Trial
Silver medal – second place	2010 Mayagüez	Sprint
Silver medal – second place	2010 Mayagüez	Team Sprint
Silver medal – second place	2010 Mayagüez	Keirin
Bronze medal – third place	2002 San Salvador	500m Time Trial
Bronze medal – third place	2002 San Salvador	Sprint
Bronze medal – third place	2010 Mayagüez	Road Race

Diana María García Orrego (born 17 March 1982) is a Colombian track cyclist. At the 2012 Summer Olympics, she competed in the women's team sprint for the national team.

== Career ==
García won the bronze medals in sprint, keirin and 500 m time trial in the 2002 Pan American Championships.

== Career Results ==
2014
1st Team Sprint, Pan American Track Championships (with Juliana Gaviria)
South American Games

2nd Team Sprint (with Juliana Gaviria)
3rd Keirin
3rd Sprint

2nd Sprint, Central American and Caribbean Games
2015
1st Team Sprint, Copa Cuba de Pista (with Juliana Gaviria)
3rd Team Sprint, Pan American Games (with Juliana Gaviria)
2017
Easter International Grand Prix

2nd Sprint
2nd Keirin
