= Cycling at the 2011 Pan American Games =

- Venues: Pan American Velodrome; Guadalajara Circuit; Pan American Mountain Bike Circuit; CODE San Nicolás
- Dates: October 15–22
- Competitors: 220

Cycling competitions at the 2011 Pan American Games in Guadalajara was held from October 15 to October 22 at the Pan American Velodrome (Track), Guadalajara Circuit (Road), Pan American Mountain Bike Circuit in Tapalpa and CODE San Nicolás (BMX).

== Medal summary ==
* Host nation (Mexico)

| Rank | Nation | Gold | Silver | Bronze | Total |
|---|---|---|---|---|---|
| 1 | Colombia | 7 | 2 | 4 | 13 |
| 2 | Venezuela | 5 | 3 | 0 | 8 |
| 3 | United States | 2 | 3 | 2 | 7 |
| 4 | Cuba | 2 | 2 | 3 | 7 |
| 5 | Canada | 1 | 1 | 2 | 4 |
| 6 | Netherlands Antilles | 1 | 0 | 0 | 1 |
| 7 | Mexico* | 0 | 3 | 1 | 4 |
| 8 | Chile | 0 | 2 | 1 | 3 |
| 9 | Argentina | 0 | 1 | 4 | 5 |
| 10 | El Salvador | 0 | 1 | 0 | 1 |
| 11 | Trinidad and Tobago | 0 | 0 | 1 | 1 |
| Totals (11 entries) | | 18 | 18 | 18 | 54 |

=== Road cycling ===
| Event | Gold | Silver | Bronze |
|---|---|---|---|
| Men's road race | Marc de Maar; Netherlands Antilles | Miguel Ubeto; Venezuela | Arnold Alcolea; Cuba |
| Women's road race | Arlenis Sierra; Cuba | Yumari González; Cuba | Yudelmis Domínguez; Cuba |
| Men's time trial | Marlon Pérez Arango; Colombia | Matias Médici; Argentina | Carlos Oyarzún; Chile |
| Women's time trial | María Luisa Calle; Colombia | Evelyn García; El Salvador | Laura Brown; Canada |

=== Track cycling ===
| Event | Gold | Silver | Bronze |
|---|---|---|---|
| Men's team pursuit | Colombia; Juan Esteban Arango; Edwin Ávila; Arles Castro; Weimar Roldán | Chile; Antonio Cabrera; Gonzalo Miranda; Pablo Seisdedos; Luis Sepúlveda | Argentina; Maximiliano Almada; Marcos Crespo; Walter Pérez; Eduardo Sepúlveda |
| Women's team pursuit | Canada; Laura Brown; Jasmin Glaesser; Stephanie Roorda | Cuba; Yumari González; Dalila Rodríguez; Yudelmis Domínguez | Colombia; María Luisa Calle; Sérika Gulumá; Lorena Vargas |
| Men's individual sprint | Hersony Canelón; Venezuela | Fabián Puerta; Colombia | Njisane Phillip; Trinidad and Tobago |
| Women's individual sprint | Lisandra Guerra; Cuba | Daniela Larreal; Venezuela | Diana García; Colombia |
| Men's team sprint | Venezuela; Hersony Canelón; César Marcano; Ángel Pulgar | United States; Michael Blatchford; Dean Tracy; James Watkins | Colombia; Jonathan Marín; Fabián Puerta; Christian Tamayo |
| Women's team sprint | Venezuela; Daniela Larreal; Mariaesthela Vilera | Colombia; Diana García; Juliana Gaviria | Mexico; Nancy Contreras; Daniela Gaxiola |
| Men's Keirin | Fabián Puerta; Colombia | Hersony Canelón; Venezuela | Leandro Bottasso; Argentina |
| Women's Keirin | Daniela Larreal; Venezuela | Daniela Gaxiola; Mexico | Dana Feiss; United States |
| Men's Omnium | Juan Esteban Arango; Colombia | Luis Mansilla; Chile | Walter Pérez; Argentina |
| Women's Omnium | Angie González; Venezuela | Sofía Arreola; Mexico | Marlies Mejías; Cuba |

=== Mountain biking ===
| Event | Gold | Silver | Bronze |
|---|---|---|---|
| Men's cross-country | Héctor Leonardo Páez; Colombia | Max Plaxton; Canada | Jeremiah Bishop; United States |
| Women's cross-country | Heather Irmiger; United States | Lorenza Morfin; Mexico | Amanda Sin; Canada |

=== BMX ===
| Event | Gold | Silver | Bronze |
|---|---|---|---|
| Men | Connor Fields; United States | Nicholas Long; United States | Andrés Jiménez; Colombia |
| Women | Mariana Pajón; Colombia | Arielle Martin; United States | Gabriela Díaz; Argentina |

== Schedule ==
All times are Central Daylight Time (UTC−5).

| Day | Date | Start | Finish | Event | Phase |
|---|---|---|---|---|---|
| Day 2 | Saturday October 15, 2011 | 9:00 | 13:45 | Women's cross-country | Final |
| Day 2 | Saturday October 15, 2011 | 9:00 | 13:45 | Men's cross-country | Final |
| Day 3 | Sunday October 16, 2011 | 9:00 | 12:00 | Women's individual time trial | Final |
| Day 3 | Sunday October 16, 2011 | 9:00 | 12:00 | Men's individual time trial | Final |
| Day 4 | Monday October 17, 2011 | 10:00 | 12:00 | Men's team pursuit, team sprint | Qualification |
| Day 4 | Monday October 17, 2011 | 10:00 | 12:00 | Women's team sprint | Qualification |
| Day 4 | Monday October 17, 2011 | 16:00 | 17:20 | Men's team pursuit, team sprint | Finals |
| Day 4 | Monday October 17, 2011 | 16:00 | 17:20 | Women's team sprint | Finals |
| Day 5 | Tuesday October 18, 2011 | 10:00 | 13:25 | Men's omnium | Preliminaries |
| Day 5 | Tuesday October 18, 2011 | 10:00 | 13:25 | Women's individual sprint | Qualification/Quarter/Semifinals |
| Day 5 | Tuesday October 18, 2011 | 10:00 | 13:25 | Women's team pursuit | Qualification/Semifinals |
| Day 5 | Tuesday October 18, 2011 | 16:00 | 20:10 | Men's omnium | Preliminaries |
| Day 5 | Tuesday October 18, 2011 | 16:00 | 20:10 | Women's team pursuit, individual sprint | Finals |
| Day 6 | Wednesday October 19, 2011 | 10:00 | 11:50 | Men's omnium | Preliminaries |
| Day 6 | Wednesday October 19, 2011 | 10:00 | 11:50 | Women's omnium | Preliminaries |
| Day 6 | Wednesday October 19, 2011 | 16:00 | 17:55 | Women's omnium | Preliminaries |
| Day 6 | Wednesday October 19, 2011 | 16:00 | 17:55 | Men's individual sprint, omnium | Finals |
| Day 7 | Thursday October 20, 2011 | 10:00 | 11:50 | Men's keirin | Preliminaries |
| Day 7 | Thursday October 20, 2011 | 10:00 | 11:50 | Women's omnium, keirin | Preliminaries |
| Day 7 | Thursday October 20, 2011 | 16:00 | 17:45 | Men's keirin | Finals |
| Day 7 | Thursday October 20, 2011 | 16:00 | 17:45 | Women's keirin, omnium | Finals |
| Day 8 | Friday October 21, 2011 | 9:00 | 12:15 | Women's BMX | Elimination/Final |
| Day 8 | Friday October 21, 2011 | 9:00 | 12:15 | Men's BMX | Elimination/Final |
| Day 9 | Saturday October 22, 2011 | 9:00 | 16:45 | Women's individual road race | Final |
| Day 9 | Saturday October 22, 2011 | 9:00 | 16:45 | Men's individual road race | Final |

== Qualification ==
=== Quota Places ===
| Event | Men | Women | Total |
|---|---|---|---|
| Track | 49 | 34 | 83 |
| Road | 20 | 15 | 35 |
| Mountain Biking | ~~24~~ 26 | ~~14~~ 11 | ~~38~~ 37 |
| BMX | ~~22~~ 20 | ~~14~~ 16 | 36 |
| Host Country | 14 | 10 | 24 |
| Caribbean Championships | 4 | 0 | 4 |
| Total athletes | 133 | 87 | 220 |
