= Mauricio Quiroga =

Argentine cyclist (1992–2022)

Mauricio Ezequiel Quiroga
Personal information
- Full name: Mauricio Ezequiel Quiroga
- Born: 13 March 1992 San Luis, Argentina
- Died: 20 June 2022 (aged 30) Juana Koslay, Argentina

Cycling career
- Sport: Cycling
- Disciplines: Road; Track
- Role: Rider

Amateur teams
- 2010–2011: World Cycling Centre
- 2020: Municipalidad de Godoy Cruz
- 2022: Coraza Hierros

Professional teams
- 2012–2016: San Luis Somos Todos
- 2017–2019: Sindicato de Empleados Publicos de San Juan

Mauricio Ezequiel Quiroga (13 March 1992 – 20 June 2022) was an Argentine racing cyclist.

== Biography ==
In 2010, Quiroga joined the World Cycling Centre, where he met cyclists such as Ran Margaliot and Daniel Teklehaimanot. In 2012, he became a professional cyclist, joining the Argentine team San Luis Somos Todos.

Mauricio Quiroga committed suicide in Juana Koslay on 20 June 2022 at the age of 30.

== Major results ==
2010
2nd Keirin, UCI Junior Track World Championships
2014
National Track Championships

1st Scratch
1st Kilometer

2016
1st Stage 4 Vuelta a Mendoza
2017
1st Mendoza-San Juan
1st Doble Media Agua
2018
2nd Overall Giro del Sol San Juan

1st Stage 1

1st Stage 5 Doble Bragado
2022
2nd Overall Vuelta del Porvenir San Luis

1st Stages 1 & 5

10th Overall Vuelta a Formosa Internacional

1st Stage 3
