= César Marcano =

Venezuelan cyclist (born 1987)

Personal information
- Full name: César Mervin Marcano Sánchez
- Born: October 22, 1987 (age 38) Carabobo, Venezuela
Medal record
Men's track cycling
Representing Venezuela
Pan American Games
Gold medal – first place	2011 Guadalajara	Team sprint
Silver medal – second place	2007 Rio de Janeiro	Team Sprint
Silver medal – second place	2015 Toronto	Team sprint
Pan American Championships
Gold medal – first place	2013 Mexico City	Team sprint
Gold medal – first place	2014 Aguascalientes	Team sprint
Gold medal – first place	2015 Santiago	Team sprint
Silver medal – second place	2010 Aguascalientes	Team sprint
Bronze medal – third place	2011 Medellin	Team sprint
Bronze medal – third place	2012 Mar del Plata	Team sprint
Central American and Caribbean Games
Gold medal – first place	2010 Mayagüez	Team sprint
Bronze medal – third place	2006 Cartagena	Team Sprint
Bronze medal – third place	2006 Cartagena	Keirin

César Mervin Marcano Sánchez (born October 22, 1987, in Carabobo) is a male professional track and road cyclist from Venezuela. He won a silver medal for his native country at the 2007 Pan American Games in Rio de Janeiro, Brazil, alongside Hersony Canelón and Andris Hernández in the Men's Track Team Sprint.

== Career ==
2007
in Pan American Games, Track, Team Sprint, Rio de Janeiro (BRA)
2010
in Central American and Caribbean Games, Track, Team Sprint, Mayagüez (PUR)
in Pan American Road and Track Championships, Track, Team Sprint, Aguascalientes (MEX)
2011
in Round 2 2011–12 UCI Track Cycling World Cup, Team Sprint, Cali (COL)
in Venezuelan National Championships, Track, Keirin
in Venezuelan National Championships, Track, Sprint
2012
in Venezuelan National Championships, Track, Keirin
in Venezuelan National Championships, Track, Sprint
in Venezuelan National Championships, Track, Team Sprint
in Pan American Road and Track Championships, Track, Team Sprint
in Round 1 2012–13 UCI Track Cycling World Cup, Team Sprint, Cali (COL)
2013
in Pan American Road and Track Championships, Track, Team Sprint, Mexico City (MEX)
in Venezuelan National Championships, Track, Sprint
in Venezuelan National Championships, Track, Team Sprint
in Venezuelan National Championships, Track, Keirin
