= Leonardo Narváez =

Colombian cyclist (born 1980)

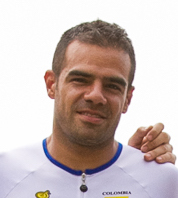
- Narváez in 2014

Personal information
- Born: December 10, 1980 (age 45) Cali, Colombia

Sport
- Sport: Cycling
Medal record
Representing Colombia
Pan American Games
Gold medal – first place	2007 Rio de Janeiro	Keirin
Silver medal – second place	2003 Santo Domingo	Individual sprint
Silver medal – second place	2003 Santo Domingo	Team sprint
Bronze medal – third place	2007 Rio de Janeiro	Team sprint
Central American and Caribbean Games
Gold medal – first place	2010 Mayaguez	Keirin
Gold medal – first place	2010 Mayaguez	Team sprint
Gold medal – first place	2010 Mayaguez	Individual time trial

Leonardo Alfredo Narváez Romero (born December 10, 1980) is a male professional track and road cyclist from Colombia. He won two medals for his native country at the 2007 Pan American Games in Rio de Janeiro, Brazil.

== Career ==
2003
2nd in Colombia National Championship, Track, 1 km, Duitama (COL)
3rd in Colombia National Championship, Track, Keirin, Duitama (COL)
2nd in Colombia National Championship, Track, Sprint, U23, Duitama (COL)
in Pan American Games, Track, Sprint, Santo Domingo (DOM)
in Pan American Games, Track, Team Sprint, Santo Domingo (DOM)
2004
in Pan American Championships, Track, Keirin, San Carlos Tinaquillo
2005
2nd in Colombia National Championship, Track, Keirin, Colombia (COL)
2007
in Pan American Games, Track, Keirin, Rio de Janeiro (BRA)
in Pan American Games, Track, Team Sprint, Rio de Janeiro (BRA)
2008
1st in Track, Keirin, Cali (COL)
2009
in Pan American Championships, Track, Sprint, Mexico City (MEX)
2010
in Central American and Caribbean Games, Track, Keirin, Mayagüez (PUR)
in Central American and Caribbean Games, Track, Team Sprint, Mayagüez (PUR)
in Central American and Caribbean Games, Track, 1km time trial, Mayagüez (PUR)
