= Mattamy National Cycling Centre =

Indoor velodrome in Milton, Ontario, Canada

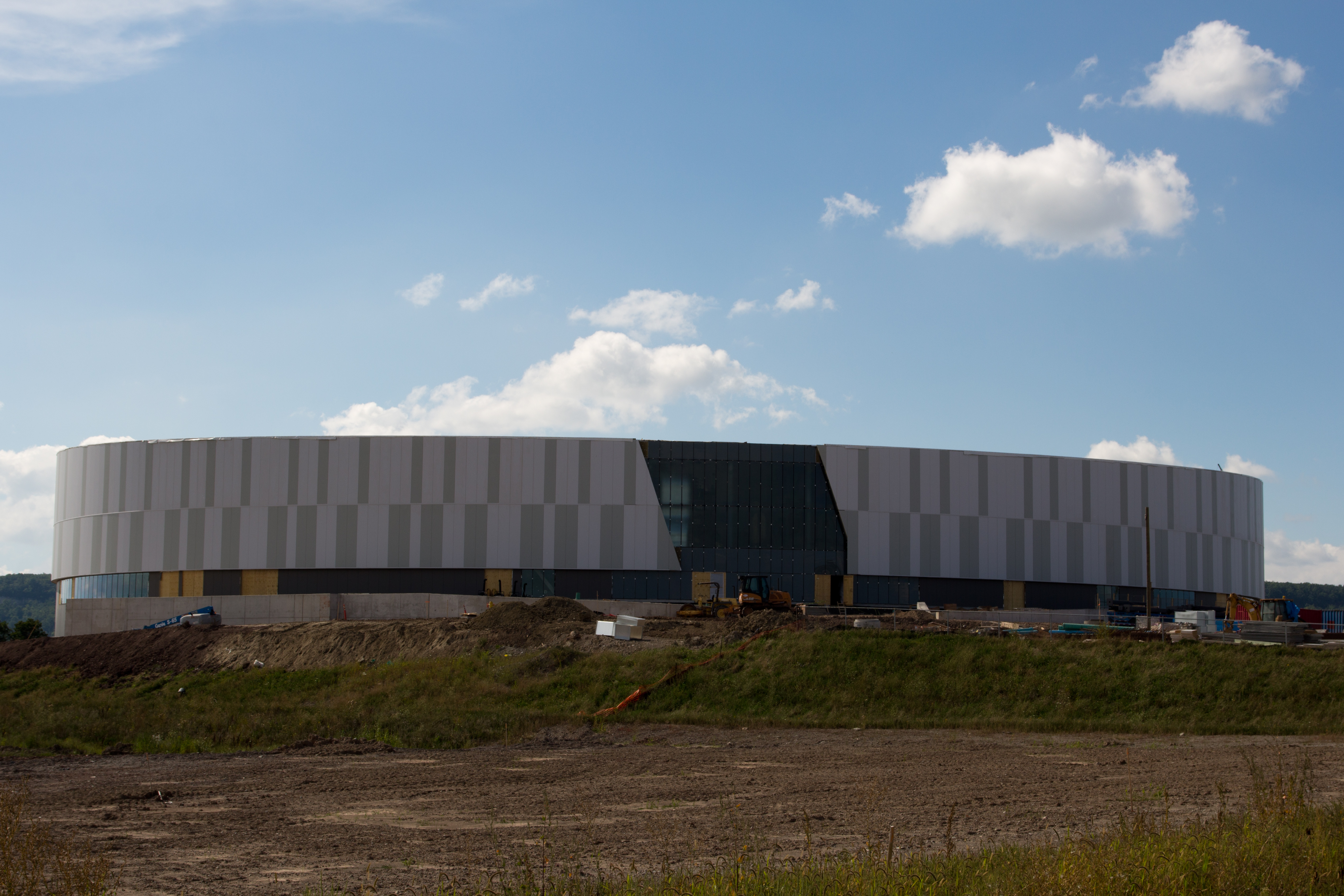
- Mattamy National Cycling Centre under construction in Milton, Ontario, Canada
- Interactive map of Mattamy National Cycling Centre
- Location: 2015 Pan Am Boulevard, Milton, Ontario
- Coordinates: 43.475613°N 79.875955°W
- Owner: Town of Milton
- Capacity: 2,500 (Games mode); 1,500 (legacy mode)
- Field size: 154,000 sq ft

Construction
- Built: February 2013 – December 2014
- Opened: January 3, 2015
- Cost: $63 million CAD

Tenants
- 2015 Pan American Games; 2015 Parapan American Games; UCI Track Cycling World Cup (2017-2019); 2020 UCI Para-cycling Track World Championships; UCI Track Cycling Nations Cup (2022-Present); Cycling Canada Cyclisme; Ontario Cycling Association

The Mattamy National Cycling Centre is a track cycling facility in Milton, Ontario, Canada built for the 2015 Pan American Games. During the Pan Am and Parapan Am Games the venue was known as the Cisco Milton Pan Am / Parapan Am Velodrome.

== Description ==
The velodrome is the first-ever UCI-regulated, class 1 indoor velodrome in Canada, and only the second in North America along with the VELO Sports Center in Los Angeles. It features a 250-metre timber track with two 42-degree angle banks. During the games the velodrome had 2,500 seats. After the games the velodrome became the home of Cycling Canada's national track cycling program, with the seating being reduced to 1,500. The facility also includes community recreational space including a cardio and strength training fitness centre, group fitness studio, 300 metre walking/jogging track and three sport courts for volleyball, basketball, and badminton.

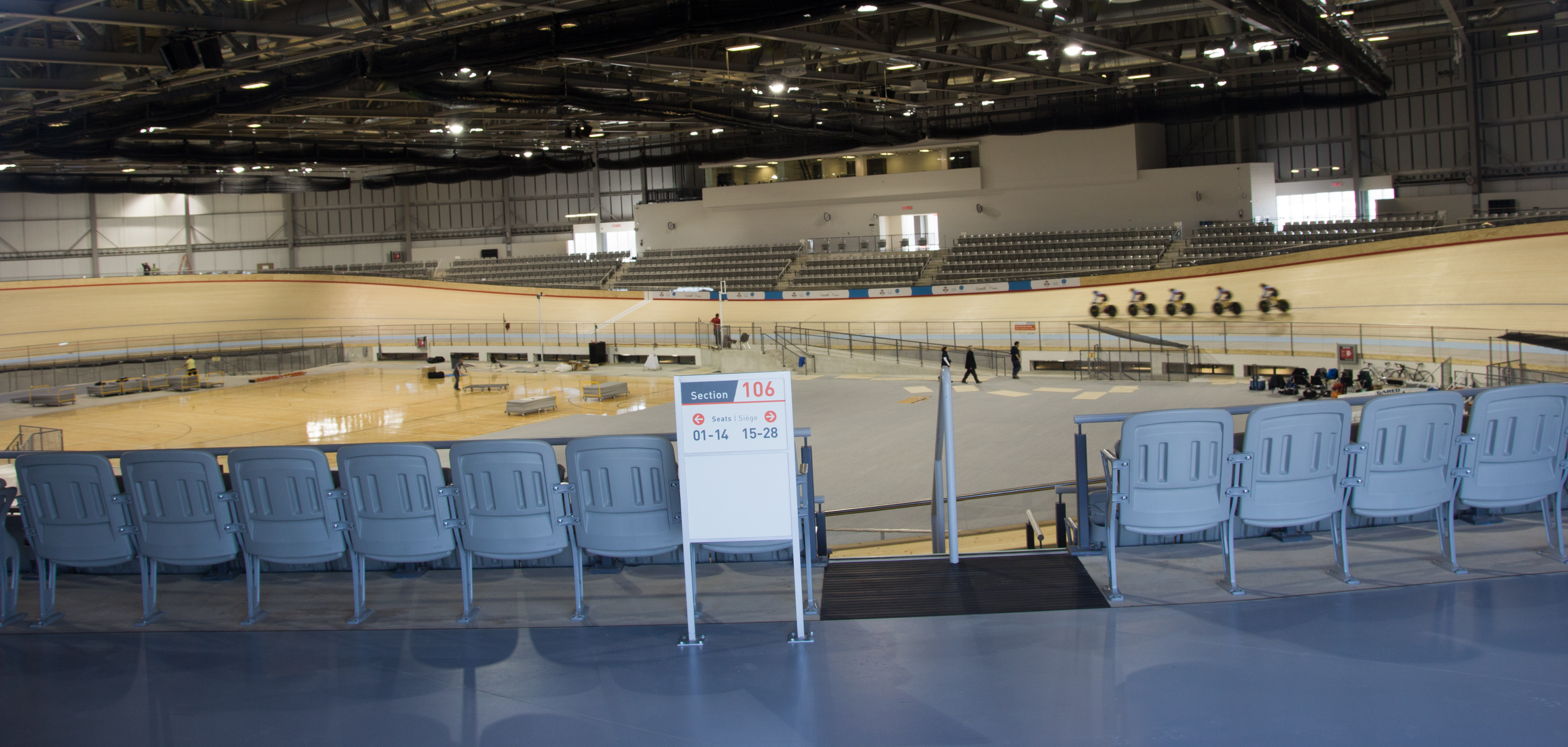
Cyclists training on the track at the Mattamy National Cycling Centre.

== Financing & Opposition ==
The facility was originally scheduled to be built at Mohawk College in Hamilton, however the city withdrew after its city council voted to spend a maximum of only $5 million. In October 2011, Milton council was given six weeks by organizers to sign a binding agreement. "We only have six weeks for binding agreement. That's not enough time for public feedback and that makes me nervous," said Ward 8 Councillor Zeeshan Hamid. On January 31, 2012 Milton town council voted in favour of building the velodrome in their town.

The facility costed a total of $56 million to build (with $47.4 million to build/design the facility and the rest going to operation costs after the games have finished).

Milton paid 44 percent of the cost to build the velodrome ($25 million), which will come from the town itself, the proposed Milton Education Village and private donations. The rest ($31 million) came from the Toronto Organizing Committee for the 2015 Pan and Parapan American Games.

After Montreal failed to sustain its track cycling venue from the 1976 Summer Olympics, some Milton residents and town councillors questioned the long-term viability of such a facility in Milton after the 2015 Pan Am Games. "There's a lot of suppositions," said Councillor Rick Malboeuf. "This could happen, that could happen. The business plan doesn't make sense." Malboeuf was convinced history will repeat itself in Milton. Communities such as Hamilton and Vaughan passed on the Pan Am velodrome, he pointed out. "They had a good reason. It's such a highly specialized sport. Where are the regular participants and events going to come from after the games are over? Just like the other venues like Montreal, this one will sit empty." As to his constituents, he said, "Twenty to one, they're against it. They want to know why we're worried about a velodrome when we don't even have a hospital. That's what they want. But it's going to get done. They have the votes. I'm still not going to vote for it."

In June 2013 Milton Mayor Gord Krantz said "We are committed. Some of us may not like how this has evolved, but we are at least in my opinion, at the point of no return." He said, down the road, he hopes he can hold Malboeuf accountable to his words that he be the first to stand up and say he was wrong should the project turn out to be a success. "I predict he will. He's a man of his word and I believe he'll say he's wrong," said Krantz.

According to Community Services Director Jennifer Reynolds, the initial $40 million price tag was expected to be covered by the following sources listed in a 2011 staff report:

- $19.8 million from the "host" community
- $3.8 million from the town (mostly funded from development charges)
- $7 million from Mattamy Homes President and CEO Peter Gilgan
- $2 million from naming rights (ultimately Mattamy Homes)
- $3 million from a local fundraising campaign
- $2.5 million from the education village partner (not confirmed)
- $1.5 million from in-kind capital

Total: $39.6 million

Initial construction costs were announced as being $40 million, but ballooned to $56 million before work began. "I said back then it couldn't be built for $40 million and I was told I was wrong and now we're seeing the cost will be more like $56 million and a shovel hasn't even hit the ground yet," said Malboeuf.

The breakdown evolved to:

- $38.4 million Sport Canada (Government of Canada) share
- $17.6 million Milton's "local share" commitment (capped)
  - $3.6 million Town's portion of this local share, mostly funded from development charges
  - $14.0 million raised through a fundraising campaign.

The Town's portion of $3.6 million has been re-directed from the budget for the Sherwood Community Centre which would have opened in 2015/2016. By legislation, recreation development funds are only available for use on recreational facilities (not roads, hospitals, or fire services).

In February 2013, it was revealed that early construction of roads and additional site costs had caused the total project cost to mushroom to $63 million.

In June 2013 the legacy funding was announced as being $735,850 annually for 20 years commencing in 2014. The legacy grant amount will be revisited on an annual basis after the initial three years over the minimum 20-year life of the Legacy Fund. A 2016 Velodrome Operating Forecast released in 2013 showing anticipated revenues versus expenditures projected a net loss of $410,499.

=== Incorporation Into Education Village ===
The Town's plan to have the velodrome anchor the proposed future Wilfrid Laurier University in the Milton Education Village took a hit in May 2015 when the province rejected Laurier's pitch for the satellite campus on the site. The Ministry of Training, Colleges and Universities says there will be a second call for proposals in spring 2016, for a campus in the Peel and Halton region — which includes Milton. Laurier's president said the school does intend to resubmit its proposal.

On October 26, 2016, Ontario announced it will build new university campuses in Milton and Brampton as part of a larger plan to improve access to education in underserved areas of the province. At the announcement in Milton, Minister of Advanced Education and Skills Development Deb Matthews said the facilities will focus on science, technology, engineering, arts and mathematics (STEAM).

=== Community Usage ===
In a September 2016 Town of Milton staff report, track cycling numbers at the local velodrome exceeded the Town's expectations, with waitlists for track time continuing to grow:

- 9,205 participants in registered cycling programs, with a further 1,213 on waitlists
- 29,677 visits to drop-in cycling sessions
- 8,301 bike rentals
- 3,781 riders certified on the track
- 100 per cent of bike lockers rented, with 131 people waitlisted
- 2,826 walking/jogging track members
- 5,581 hours rented or programmed in the gym courts, with an average of 15 participants per hour

In 2016, the net operating cost per capita for the MNCC is sitting at $4.03 – the second lowest of the major Town facilities, with the Leisure Centre sitting at the bottom of the list at $2.95. The Milton Sports Centre is $5.48, Beaty Branch Library is $6.10 and the Milton Centre for the Arts leads the pack at $6.19 (excluding the library).

Ward 4 councillor Rick Malboeuf, said the legacy funding of $735,000 the Town receives from the provincial and federal governments to offset the operating costs of the velodrome aren't included in the aforementioned per capita cost breakdown. If they were, he estimated it would increase the per capita cost from $4.03 to around $12. But councillor Rick Di Lorenzo, who sits on the MNCC Management Committee, contended that since the legacy funds include federal dollars and are therefore paid by all Canadians, not just Miltonians, including those funds in the calculations would only increase the per capita cost by two cents.

== Major competitions hosted ==
Year	Date	Event	Level
2015	January 3–6	Canadian Track Championships	National
2015	January 9–11	Milton International Challenge	International - UCI - Class 1 Event
2015	July 16–19	2015 Pan American Games	International
2015	August 7–15	2015 Parapan American Games	International
2016	February 13	Eastern Track Challenge	National
2016	April 1–3	Canadian Cadet/Junior Track Championships	National
2016	September 24–27	Canadian Track Championships	National
2016	September 29–October 1	Milton International Challenge	International - UCI - Class 1 Event
2017	September 27–30	Canadian Track Championships	National
2017	December 1–3	2017–18 UCI Track Cycling World Cup	International - UCI - Class 1 Event
2018	September 27–29	Canadian Track Championships	National
2018	October 26–28	2018–19 UCI Track Cycling World Cup	International - UCI - Class 1 Event
2019	September 26–28	Canadian Track Championships	National
2020	January 24–26	2019–20 UCI Track Cycling World Cup	International - UCI - Class 1 Event
2020	January 30-February 2	2020 UCI Para-cycling Track World Championships	International - UCI
2022	May 12–15	2022 UCI Track Cycling Nations Cup	International - UCI
2023	April 20–23	2023 UCI Track Cycling Nations Cup	International - UCI
2024	April 12–14	2024 UCI Track Cycling Nations Cup	International - UCI

== See also ==
- Venues of the 2015 Pan American and Parapan American Games
- List of cycling tracks and velodromes
