= 2014 Colombia season =

2014 Colombia season
Manager	Claudio Corti
One-day victories	–
Stage race overall victories	–
Stage race stage victories	2
Previous season • Next season

The 2014 season for the Colombia cycling team began in January at the Tour de San Luis. The team participated in UCI Continental Circuits and UCI World Tour events when given a wildcard invitation.

== 2014 roster ==
As of 31 January 2014.

Rider	Date of birth
Juan Arango (COL)	9 October 1986 (age 40)
Edwin Ávila (COL)	21 December 1989 (age 36)
Robinson Chalapud (COL)	8 March 1984 (age 42)
Edward Díaz (COL)	19 August 1994 (age 32)
Fabio Duarte (COL)	11 June 1986 (age 40)
Leonardo Duque (COL)	10 April 1980 (age 46)
Luis Largo (COL)	14 April 1990 (age 36)
Jarlinson Pantano (COL)	19 November 1988 (age 38)

Rider	Date of birth
Darwin Pantoja (COL)	25 September 1990 (age 36)
Jonathan Paredes (COL)	4 April 1989 (age 37)
Carlos Quintero (COL)	5 March 1986 (age 40)
Dúber Quintero (COL)	23 August 1990 (age 36)
Jeffry Romero (COL)	4 October 1989 (age 37)
Miguel Ángel Rubiano (COL)	3 October 1984 (age 42)
Rodolfo Torres (COL)	21 March 1987 (age 39)
Juan Pablo Valencia (COL)	2 May 1988 (age 38)

Riders who joined the team for the 2014 season

Rider	2013 team
Edward Díaz	neo-pro
Luis Largo	neo-pro
Darwin Pantoja	neo-pro
Jonathan Paredes	neo-pro (Supergiros–Blanco del Valle–Redetrans)
Miguel Ángel Rubiano	Androni Giocattoli–Venezuela
Rodolfo Torres	neo-pro (Formesan–Bogotá Humana)

Riders who left the team during or after the 2013 season

Rider	2014 team
Darwin Atapuma	BMC Racing Team
Julio Camacho	
Esteban Chaves	Orica–GreenEDGE
Marco Corti	
Wilson Marentes	
Dalivier Ospina	
Michael Rodríguez	
Juan Pablo Suárez	EPM–UNE–Área Metropolitana

== Season victories ==
Date	Race	Competition	Rider	Country	Location
16 February	Tour Méditerranéen, Mountains classification	UCI Europe Tour	Jarlinson Pantano (COL)	France	
27 February	Tour de Langkawi, Stage 1	UCI Asia Tour	Dúber Quintero (COL)	Malaysia	Langkawi
25 April	Giro del Trentino, Sprints classification	UCI Europe Tour	Leonardo Duque (COL)	Italy	
7 August	Vuelta a Colombia, Stage 2	UCI America Tour	Jeffry Romero (COL)	Colombia	Barbosa
