= 2015 Colombia season =

Colombia
- 2015 season
- UCI code: COL
- Status: UCI Professional Continental
- Manager: Claudio Corti
- Main sponsor(s): Coldeportes
- Based: Adro, Italy
- Bicycles: Wilier Triestina

Season victories
- One-day races: -
- Stage race overall: -
- Stage race stages: -

The 2015 season for the Colombia cycling team began in January at the Tour de San Luis. The team participated in UCI Continental Circuits and UCI World Tour events when given a wildcard invitation.

== 2015 roster ==
Rider	Date of birth
Alex Cano (COL)	13 March 1983 (age 42)
Jorge Castiblanco (COL)	24 November 1988 (age 36)
Edwin Ávila (COL)	21 December 1989 (age 35)
Edward Díaz (COL)	19 August 1994 (age 30)
Fabio Duarte (COL)	11 June 1986 (age 38)
Leonardo Duque (COL)	10 April 1980 (age 44)
Daniel Martínez (COL)	25 April 1996 (age 28)
Juan Sebastián Molano (COL)	11 April 1994 (age 30)
Darwin Pantoja (COL)	25 September 1990 (age 34)

Rider	Date of birth
Jonathan Paredes (COL)	4 April 1989 (age 35)
Walter Pedraza (COL)	27 November 1981 (age 43)
Carlos Quintero (COL)	5 March 1986 (age 39)
Brayan Ramírez (COL)	20 November 1992 (age 32)
Carlos Ramírez (COL)	26 October 1994 (age 30)
Miguel Ángel Rubiano (COL)	3 October 1984 (age 40)
Cayetano Sarmiento (COL)	28 March 1987 (age 37)
Rodolfo Torres (COL)	21 March 1987 (age 37)
Juan Pablo Valencia (COL)	2 May 1988 (age 36)

Riders who joined the team for the 2015 season

Rider	2014 team
Alex Caño	Aguardiente Antioqueño
Jorge Castiblanco	neo-pro (EPM–UNE)
Daniel Martínez	neo-pro
Juan Sebastián Molano	neo-pro (Coldeportes-Claro)
Walter Pedraza	EPM–UNE–Área Metropolitana
Brayan Ramírez	neo-pro (Movistar Team América)
Carlos Ramírez	neo-pro (Aguardiente Antioqueño)
Cayetano Sarmiento	Cannondale

Riders who left the team during or after the 2014 season

Rider	2015 team
Juan Arango	Coldeportes-Claro
Robinson Chalapud	Aguardiente Antioqueño-Idea
Luis Largo	Provisionally suspended
Jarlinson Pantano	IAM Cycling
Dúber Quintero	
Jeffry Romero	

== Season victories ==
Date	Race	Competition	Rider	Country	Location
25 January	Tour de San Luis, Mountains classification	UCI America Tour	Rodolfo Torres (COL)	Argentina	
25 January	Tour de San Luis, Teams classification	UCI America Tour	(Note: The riders on the squad were Edward Díaz, Leonardo Duque, Carlos Quintero, Miguel Ángel Rubiano, Rodolfo Torres and Juan Pablo Valencia)	Argentina	
17 March	Tirreno–Adriatico, Mountains classification	UCI World Tour	Carlos Quintero (COL)	Italy	
24 April	Giro del Trentino, Mountains classification	UCI Europe Tour	Rodolfo Torres (COL)	Italy	
3 May	Tour of Turkey, Mountains classification	UCI Europe Tour	Juan Pablo Valencia (COL)	Turkey	
3 May	Vuelta a Asturias, Mountains classification	UCI Europe Tour	Rodolfo Torres (COL)	Spain	
7 June	Tour de Luxembourg, Mountains classification	UCI Europe Tour	Fabio Duarte (COL)	Luxembourg	
7 June	Tour de Luxembourg, Teams classification	UCI Europe Tour	(Note: The riders on the squad were Edwin Ávila, Alex Cano, Fabio Duarte, Leonardo Duque, Carlos Quintero, Brayan Ramírez, Miguel Ángel Rubiano and Rodolfo Torres)	Luxembourg	
21 June	Route du Sud, Mountains classification	UCI Europe Tour	Daniel Martínez (COL)	France	
8 August	Vuelta a Burgos, Mountains classification	UCI Europe Tour	Fabio Duarte (COL)	Spain	
9 August	Tour of Utah, Young rider classification	UCI America Tour	Daniel Martínez (COL)	United States	
9 August	Tour of Utah, Teams classification	UCI America Tour	(Note: The riders on the squad were Edwin Ávila, Alex Cano, Camilo Castiblanco, Daniel Felipe Martínez, Juan Sebastián Molano, Walter Pedraza, Carlos Ramírez and Cayetano Sarmiento)	United States	
