= List of teams and cyclists in the 2014 Giro d'Italia =

The 2014 Giro d'Italia was the 97th edition of the Giro d'Italia, one of cycling's Grand Tours. The Giro d'Italia featured 198 riders competing from 22 cycling teams, and was held from 9 May to 1 June 2014.

== Teams ==
All eighteen UCI ProTeams were automatically invited and were obliged to attend the race. As the winners of the 2013 Coppa Italia rankings for Italian teams, Androni Giocattoli–Venezuela were invited to the race in October 2013. In January 2014, the three remaining wildcard places were decided by a vote on social media, from a shortlist of eight UCI Professional Continental teams. The places were later awarded to the Bardiani–CSF, Colombia and Neri Sottoli squads.

The 22 teams that competed in the race were:

- Ag2r–La Mondiale
- Androni Giocattoli–Venezuela*
- Astana
- Bardiani–CSF*
- Belkin Pro Cycling
- BMC Racing Team
- Cannondale
- Colombia*
- Team Europcar
- FDJ.fr
- Garmin–Sharp
- Giant–Shimano
- Team Katusha
- Lampre–Merida
- Lotto–Belisol
- Movistar Team
- Neri Sottoli*
- Omega Pharma–Quick-Step
- Orica–GreenEDGE
- Team Sky
- Tinkoff–Saxo
- Trek Factory Racing

*: Pro Continental teams given wild card entry to this event.

== By rider ==
Legend
No.	Starting number worn by the rider during the Giro
Pos.	Position in the general classification
†	Denotes riders born on or after 1 January 1989 eligible for the Young rider classification
A pink jersey	Denotes the winner of the General classification
A red jersey	Denotes the winner of the Points classification
A blue jersey	Denotes the winner of the Mountains classification
A white jersey	Denotes the winner of the Young rider classification (eligibility indicated by †)
DNS	Denotes a rider who did not start, followed by the stage before which he withdrew
DNF	Denotes a rider who did not finish, followed by the stage in which he withdrew
HD	Denotes a rider who failed to finish within the time limit, followed by the stage in which this occurred
DSQ	Denotes a rider who was disqualified from the race, followed by the stage during which this occurred
Age correct as of 9 May 2014, the date on which the Giro began

No.	Name	Nationality	Team	Age	Position
1	Michele Scarponi	Italy	Astana	34	DNF-16
2	Valerio Agnoli	Italy	Astana	29	71
3	Fabio Aru †	Italy	Astana	23	3
4	Janez Brajkovič	Slovenia	Astana	30	DNF-6
5	Enrico Gasparotto	Italy	Astana	32	97
6	Borut Božič	Slovenia	Astana	33	124
7	Mikel Landa †	Spain	Astana	24	34
8	Paolo Tiralongo	Italy	Astana	36	45
9	Andrey Zeits	Kazakhstan	Astana	27	102
11	Domenico Pozzovivo	Italy	Ag2r–La Mondiale	31	5
12	Davide Appollonio †	Italy	Ag2r–La Mondiale	24	HD-11
13	Julien Bérard	France	Ag2r–La Mondiale	26	70
14	Maxime Bouet	France	Ag2r–La Mondiale	27	38
15	Axel Domont †	France	Ag2r–La Mondiale	23	58
16	Hubert Dupont	France	Ag2r–La Mondiale	33	16
17	Patrick Gretsch	Germany	Ag2r–La Mondiale	27	95
18	Matteo Montaguti	Italy	Ag2r–La Mondiale	30	44
19	Alexis Vuillermoz	France	Ag2r–La Mondiale	25	11
21	Franco Pellizotti	Italy	Androni Giocattoli–Venezuela	36	12
22	Manuel Belletti	Italy	Androni Giocattoli–Venezuela	28	DNS-14
23	Marco Frapporti	Italy	Androni Giocattoli–Venezuela	29	108
24	Yonder Godoy †	Venezuela	Androni Giocattoli–Venezuela	21	76
25	Johnny Hoogerland	Netherlands	Androni Giocattoli–Venezuela	30	105
26	Marco Bandiera	Italy	Androni Giocattoli–Venezuela	29	142
27	Jackson Rodríguez	Venezuela	Androni Giocattoli–Venezuela	29	86
28	Diego Rosa †	Italy	Androni Giocattoli–Venezuela	25	DNF-18
29	Emanuele Sella	Italy	Androni Giocattoli–Venezuela	33	63
31	Stefano Pirazzi	Italy	Bardiani–CSF	27	85
32	Enrico Battaglin †	Italy	Bardiani–CSF	24	52
33	Nicola Boem †	Italy	Bardiani–CSF	24	128
34	Francesco Manuel Bongiorno †	Italy	Bardiani–CSF	23	59
35	Marco Canola	Italy	Bardiani–CSF	25	122
36	Sonny Colbrelli †	Italy	Bardiani–CSF	23	94
37	Enrico Barbin †	Italy	Bardiani–CSF	24	119
38	Nicola Ruffoni †	Italy	Bardiani–CSF	23	HD-11
39	Edoardo Zardini †	Italy	Bardiani–CSF	24	53
41	Wilco Kelderman †	Netherlands	Belkin Pro Cycling	23	7
42	Jetse Bol †	Netherlands	Belkin Pro Cycling	24	156
43	Rick Flens	Netherlands	Belkin Pro Cycling	31	132
44	Marc Goos †	Netherlands	Belkin Pro Cycling	23	35
45	Martijn Keizer	Netherlands	Belkin Pro Cycling	26	67
46	Steven Kruijswijk	Netherlands	Belkin Pro Cycling	26	DNF-9
47	David Tanner	Australia	Belkin Pro Cycling	29	130
48	Maarten Tjallingii	Netherlands	Belkin Pro Cycling	36	92
49	Jos van Emden	Netherlands	Belkin Pro Cycling	29	107
51	Cadel Evans	Australia	BMC Racing Team	37	8
52	Brent Bookwalter	United States	BMC Racing Team	30	68
53	Yannick Eijssen †	Belgium	BMC Racing Team	24	DNF-10
54	Ben Hermans	Belgium	BMC Racing Team	27	72
55	Steve Morabito	Switzerland	BMC Racing Team	31	25
56	Daniel Oss	Italy	BMC Racing Team	27	103
57	Manuel Quinziato	Italy	BMC Racing Team	34	112
58	Samuel Sánchez	Spain	BMC Racing Team	36	24
59	Danilo Wyss	Switzerland	BMC Racing Team	28	84
61	Ivan Basso	Italy	Cannondale	36	15
62	Oscar Gatto	Italy	Cannondale	29	116
63	Michel Koch †	Germany	Cannondale	22	152
64	Paolo Longo Borghini	Italy	Cannondale	33	99
65	Alan Marangoni	Italy	Cannondale	29	137
66	Moreno Moser †	Italy	Cannondale	23	120
67	Daniele Ratto †	Italy	Cannondale	24	126
68	Davide Villella †	Italy	Cannondale	22	DNF-6
69	Elia Viviani †	Italy	Cannondale	25	145
71	Fabio Duarte	Colombia	Colombia	27	28
72	Rodolfo Torres	Colombia	Colombia	27	81
73	Edwin Ávila †	Colombia	Colombia	24	HD-9
74	Robinson Chalapud	Colombia	Colombia	30	75
75	Leonardo Duque	Colombia	Colombia	34	78
76	Jarlinson Pantano	Colombia	Colombia	25	32
77	Carlos Quintero	Colombia	Colombia	28	117
78	Jeffry Romero †	Colombia	Colombia	24	149
79	Miguel Ángel Rubiano	Colombia	Colombia	29	101
81	Nacer Bouhanni †	France	FDJ.fr	23	140
82	Sébastien Chavanel	France	FDJ.fr	31	150
83	Arnaud Courteille †	France	FDJ.fr	25	DNF-16
84	Murilo Fischer	Brazil	FDJ.fr	34	135
85	Alexandre Geniez	France	FDJ.fr	26	13
86	Johan Le Bon †	France	FDJ.fr	23	89
87	Francis Mourey	France	FDJ.fr	33	33
88	Laurent Pichon	France	FDJ.fr	27	129
89	Jussi Veikkanen	Finland	FDJ.fr	33	109
91	Ryder Hesjedal	Canada	Garmin–Sharp	33	9
92	André Cardoso	Portugal	Garmin–Sharp	29	20
93	Thomas Dekker	Netherlands	Garmin–Sharp	29	DNF-16
94	Tyler Farrar	United States	Garmin–Sharp	29	147
95	Koldo Fernández	Spain	Garmin–Sharp	32	HD-1
96	Nathan Haas †	Australia	Garmin–Sharp	25	104
97	Dan Martin	Ireland	Garmin–Sharp	27	DNF-1
98	Dylan van Baarle †	Netherlands	Garmin–Sharp	21	DNS-15
99	Fabian Wegmann	Germany	Garmin–Sharp	33	DNF-11
100	Damiano Cunego	Italy	Lampre–Merida	32	19
101	Winner Anacona	Colombia	Lampre–Merida	25	62
102	Matteo Bono	Italy	Lampre–Merida	30	77
103	Mattia Cattaneo †	Italy	Lampre–Merida	23	64
104	Roberto Ferrari	Italy	Lampre–Merida	31	144
105	Manuele Mori	Italy	Lampre–Merida	33	118
106	Przemysław Niemiec	Poland	Lampre–Merida	34	49
107	Jan Polanc †	Slovenia	Lampre–Merida	22	42
109	Diego Ulissi †	Italy	Lampre–Merida	24	DNS-18
111	Maxime Monfort	Belgium	Lotto–Belisol	31	14
112	Lars Bak	Denmark	Lotto–Belisol	34	56
113	Kenny Dehaes	Belgium	Lotto–Belisol	29	HD-19
114	Gert Dockx	Belgium	Lotto–Belisol	25	115
115	Adam Hansen	Australia	Lotto–Belisol	32	73
116	Sander Armée	Belgium	Lotto–Belisol	28	47
117	Tosh Van der Sande †	Belgium	Lotto–Belisol	23	93
118	Tim Wellens †	Belgium	Lotto–Belisol	22	54
119	Dennis Vanendert	Belgium	Lotto–Belisol	25	DNS-14
121	Nairo Quintana †	Colombia	Movistar Team	24	1
122	Andrey Amador	Costa Rica	Movistar Team	27	110
123	Igor Antón	Spain	Movistar Team	31	37
124	Eros Capecchi	Italy	Movistar Team	27	79
125	Jonathan Castroviejo	Spain	Movistar Team	27	57
126	José Herrada	Spain	Movistar Team	28	23
127	Gorka Izagirre	Spain	Movistar Team	26	83
128	Francisco Ventoso	Spain	Movistar Team	32	125
129	Adriano Malori	Italy	Movistar Team	26	121
131	Matteo Rabottini	Italy	Neri Sottoli	26	17
132	Giorgio Cecchinel †	Italy	Neri Sottoli	24	DNS-6
133	Ramón Carretero †	Panama	Neri Sottoli	23	DNF-7
134	Francesco Chicchi	Italy	Neri Sottoli	33	DNS-9
135	Daniele Colli	Italy	Neri Sottoli	32	DNF-16
136	Andrea Fedi †	Italy	Neri Sottoli	22	148
137	Mauro Finetto	Italy	Neri Sottoli	28	DNF-16
138	Jonathan Monsalve †	Venezuela	Neri Sottoli	24	66
139	Simone Ponzi	Italy	Neri Sottoli	27	106
141	Rigoberto Urán	Colombia	Omega Pharma–Quick-Step	27	2
142	Gianluca Brambilla	Italy	Omega Pharma–Quick-Step	26	29
143	Thomas De Gendt	Belgium	Omega Pharma–Quick-Step	27	65
144	Iljo Keisse	Belgium	Omega Pharma–Quick-Step	31	139
145	Serge Pauwels	Belgium	Omega Pharma–Quick-Step	30	31
146	Alessandro Petacchi	Italy	Omega Pharma–Quick-Step	40	DNF-16
147	Wout Poels	Netherlands	Omega Pharma–Quick-Step	26	21
148	Pieter Serry	Belgium	Omega Pharma–Quick-Step	25	74
149	Julien Vermote †	Belgium	Omega Pharma–Quick-Step	24	88
151	Ivan Santaromita	Italy	Orica–GreenEDGE	30	DNS-18
152	Luke Durbridge †	Australia	Orica–GreenEDGE	23	DNF-11
153	Michael Hepburn †	Australia	Orica–GreenEDGE	22	154
154	Brett Lancaster	Australia	Orica–GreenEDGE	34	DNS-7
155	Michael Matthews †	Australia	Orica–GreenEDGE	23	DNS-11
156	Cameron Meyer	Australia	Orica–GreenEDGE	26	DNS-8
157	Mitchell Docker	Australia	Orica–GreenEDGE	27	DNF-15
158	Svein Tuft	Canada	Orica–GreenEDGE	37	155
159	Pieter Weening	Netherlands	Orica–GreenEDGE	33	DNF-14
161	Pierre Rolland	France	Team Europcar	27	4
162	Yukiya Arashiro	Japan	Team Europcar	29	127
163	Angelo Tulik †	France	Team Europcar	23	123
164	Tony Hurel	France	Team Europcar	26	134
165	Davide Malacarne	Italy	Team Europcar	26	39
166	Maxime Méderel	France	Team Europcar	33	DNF-7
167	Perrig Quémeneur	France	Team Europcar	30	80
168	Romain Sicard	France	Team Europcar	26	51
169	Björn Thurau	Germany	Team Europcar	25	DNF-16
171	Marcel Kittel	Germany	Giant–Shimano	25	DNS-4
172	Bert De Backer	Belgium	Giant–Shimano	30	133
173	Simon Geschke	Germany	Giant–Shimano	28	69
174	Tobias Ludvigsson †	Sweden	Giant–Shimano	23	DNF-12
175	Luka Mezgec	Slovenia	Giant–Shimano	25	136
176	Georg Preidler †	Austria	Giant–Shimano	23	27
177	Tom Stamsnijder	Netherlands	Giant–Shimano	28	143
178	Albert Timmer	Netherlands	Giant–Shimano	28	87
179	Tom Veelers	Netherlands	Giant–Shimano	29	146
181	Joaquim Rodríguez	Spain	Team Katusha	34	DNS-7
182	Maxim Belkov	Russia	Team Katusha	29	90
183	Giampaolo Caruso	Italy	Team Katusha	33	DNF-6
184	Vladimir Gusev	Russia	Team Katusha	31	60
185	Alberto Losada	Spain	Team Katusha	32	36
186	Daniel Moreno	Spain	Team Katusha	32	41
187	Luca Paolini	Italy	Team Katusha	37	111
188	Ángel Vicioso	Spain	Team Katusha	37	DNF-6
189	Eduard Vorganov	Russia	Team Katusha	31	55
191	Dario Cataldo	Italy	Team Sky	29	26
192	Edvald Boasson Hagen	Norway	Team Sky	26	DNS-16
193	Philip Deignan	Ireland	Team Sky	30	43
194	Bernhard Eisel	Austria	Team Sky	33	138
195	Sebastián Henao †	Colombia	Team Sky	20	22
196	Christopher Sutton	Australia	Team Sky	29	153
197	Salvatore Puccio †	Italy	Team Sky	24	98
198	Kanstantsin Sivtsov	Belarus	Team Sky	31	DNF-14
199	Ben Swift	Great Britain	Team Sky	26	113
201	Nicolas Roche	Ireland	Tinkoff–Saxo	29	30
202	Christopher Juul-Jensen †	Denmark	Tinkoff–Saxo	24	100
203	Rafał Majka †	Poland	Tinkoff–Saxo	24	6
204	Evgeni Petrov	Russia	Tinkoff–Saxo	35	48
205	Paweł Poljański †	Poland	Tinkoff–Saxo	23	50
206	Ivan Rovny	Russia	Tinkoff–Saxo	26	46
207	Chris Anker Sørensen	Denmark	Tinkoff–Saxo	29	DNS-12
208	Jay McCarthy †	Australia	Tinkoff–Saxo	23	91
209	Michael Rogers	Australia	Tinkoff–Saxo	34	18
211	Robert Kišerlovski	Croatia	Trek Factory Racing	27	10
212	Eugenio Alafaci †	Italy	Trek Factory Racing	23	151
213	Julián Arredondo	Colombia	Trek Factory Racing	25	61
214	Fabio Felline †	Italy	Trek Factory Racing	24	96
215	Danilo Hondo	Germany	Trek Factory Racing	40	114
216	Giacomo Nizzolo †	Italy	Trek Factory Racing	25	141
217	Boy van Poppel	Netherlands	Trek Factory Racing	26	131
218	Fumiyuki Beppu	Japan	Trek Factory Racing	31	82
219	Riccardo Zoidl	Austria	Trek Factory Racing	26	40

== By nationality ==
The 198 riders that competed in the 2014 Giro d'Italia represented 30 different countries.

Country	No. of riders	Finishers	Stage wins
Australia	13	8	3 (Michael Rogers x2, Michael Matthews)
Austria	3	3	
Belarus	1	0	
Belgium	15	12	
Brazil	1	1	
Canada	2	2	
Colombia	14	13	4 (Nairo Quintana x2, Julián Arredondo, Rigoberto Urán)
Costa Rica	1	1	
Croatia	1	1	
Denmark	3	2	
Finland	1	1	
France	18	16	3 (Nacer Bouhanni x3)
Germany	7	4	2 (Marcel Kittel x2)
Great Britain	1	1	
Ireland	3	2	
Italy	59	45	6 (Diego Ulissi x2, Fabio Aru, Enrico Battaglin, Marco Canola, Stefano Pirazzi)
Japan	2	2	
Kazakhstan	1	1	
Netherlands	17	13	1 (Pieter Weening)
Norway	1	0	
Panama	1	0	
Poland	3	3	
Portugal	1	1	
Russia	5	5	
Slovenia	4	3	1 (Luka Mezgec)
Spain	12	9	
Sweden	1	0	
Switzerland	2	2	
United States	2	2	
Venezuela	3	3	
Total	198	156	
