= 2014 Vuelta a Colombia =

2013–14 UCI America Tour

Race details
- Dates: 6–17 August 2014
- Stages: 11
- Distance: 1,523 km (946.3 mi)
- Winning time: 37h 01' 34"

Results
Jersey awarded to the overall winner	Winner	Óscar Sevilla (ESP)	(EPM–UNE–Área Metropolitana)
	Second	Fernando Camargo (COL)	(Boyacá se Atreve–Liciboy)
	Third	Alexis Camacho (COL)	(Boyacá se Atreve–Liciboy)
	Points	Óscar Sevilla (ESP)	(EPM–UNE–Área Metropolitana)
Jersey awarded to the mountains classification winner	Mountains	Walter Pedraza (COL)	(EPM–UNE–Área Metropolitana)
Jersey awarded to the youth classification winner	Youth	Aldemar Reyes (COL)	(GW–Shimano)
Jersey awarded to the sprints classification winner	Sprints	Marvin Angarita (COL)	(Movistar Team América)
	Team	Boyacá se Atreve–Liciboy	

The 2014 Vuelta a Colombia was the 64th edition of the Vuelta a Colombia cycling stage race, and was held from 6 to 17 August 2014. It was won by the Spanish cyclist Óscar Sevilla.

== Teams ==
Twenty-one teams competed in the 2014 Vuelta a Colombia. These included UCI Professional Continental team Colombia and three UCI Continental teams.

The teams that participated in the race were:

- 4-72 Colombia
- Aguardiente Antioqueño–Lotería de Medellín–IDEA
- Aguardiente Néctar–Cundinamarca Calidad de Vida
- Area Zero Pro Team
- Bike Aid–Ride for Help
- Boyacá se Atreve–Liciboy
- Club Ciclo Valle
- Coldeportes–Claro
- Colombia
- EBSA–Indeportes Boyacá
- EPM–UNE–Área Metropolitana
- Formesan–Bogotá Humana–ETB
- Fuerzas Armadas–Ejército Nacional
- Gobernación de Santander–Indersantander
- Gobernación del César
- GW–Shimano
- Liga de ciclísmo del Chocó
- Lotería de Boyacá
- Movistar Team América
- Rionegro con más Futuro
- Super Giros–Blanco del Valle–Redetrans

== Route ==
Stage characteristics and winners
Stage	Date	Course	Distance	Type	Winner
1	6 August	Piedecuesta to Bucaramanga	29 km (18 mi)	Team time trial	EPM–UNE–Área Metropolitana
2	7 August	San Gil to Barbosa	116 km (72 mi)	Hilly stage	Jeffry Romero (COL)
3	8 August	Barbosa to Tunja	123 km (76 mi)	Medium-mountain stage	Weimar Roldán (COL)
4	9 August	Nobsa to Cota	198 km (123 mi)	Hilly stage	José Jaimes (COL)
5	10 August	Madrid to Ibagué	202 km (126 mi)	Hilly stage	Óscar Sevilla (ESP)
6	11 August	Ibagué to Pereira	158 km (98 mi)	Mountain stage	Alexis Camacho (COL)
	12 August			Rest day	
7	13 August	Dosquebradas to Dosquebradas	196 km (122 mi)	Medium-mountain stage	Andrea Pasqualon (ITA)
8	14 August	Pereira to Manizales	199 km (124 mi)	Mountain stage	Félix Cárdenas (COL)
9	15 August	Manizales to La Estrella	182 km (113 mi)	Mountain stage	Fernando Camargo (COL)
10	16 August	Medellín to Alto de Las Palmas	17 km (11 mi)	Mountain time trial	Álvaro Gómez (COL)
11	17 August	Medellín to Medellín	103 km (64 mi)	Hilly stage	Jairo Salas (COL)

== Stages ==
=== Stage 1 ===
6 August 2014 — Piedecuesta to Bucaramanga, 29 km (18 mi), team time trial (TTT)

Stage 1 result
Rank	Team	Time
1	EPM–UNE–Área Metropolitana	34' 04"
2	Movistar Team América	+ 1' 31"
3	Boyacá se Atreve–Liciboy	+ 1' 35"
4	Formesan–Bogotá Humana–ETB	+ 1' 38"
5	GW–Shimano	+ 1' 48"
6	Aguardiente Antioqueño–Lotería de Medellín–IDEA	+ 1' 57"
7	Super Giros–Blanco del Valle–Redetrans	+ 2' 16"
8	Colombia	+ 2' 18"
9	Coldeportes–Claro	+ 2' 22"
10	EBSA–Indeportes Boyacá	+ 2' 26"

General classification after stage 1
Rank	Rider	Team	Time
1	Camilo Castiblanco (COL)	EPM–UNE–Área Metropolitana	34' 04"
2	Juan Pablo Suárez (COL)	EPM–UNE–Área Metropolitana	+ 0"
3	Weimar Roldán (COL)	EPM–UNE–Área Metropolitana	+ 0"
4	Óscar Sevilla (ESP)	EPM–UNE–Área Metropolitana	+ 0"
5	Walter Pedraza (COL)	EPM–UNE–Área Metropolitana	+ 0"
6	Róbigzon Oyola (COL)	EPM–UNE–Área Metropolitana	+ 0"
7	Freddy Montaña (COL)	Movistar Team América	+ 4"
8	Luis Miguel Martínez (COL)	Movistar Team América	+ 4"
9	Omar Mendoza (COL)	Movistar Team América	+ 4"
10	Wilson Cepeda (COL)	Movistar Team América	+ 4"

=== Stage 2 ===
7 August 2014 — San Gil to Barbosa, 116 km (72 mi)

Stage 2 result
Rank	Rider	Team	Time
1	Jeffry Romero (COL)	Colombia	2h 49' 05"
2	Alexis Camacho (COL)	Boyacá se Atreve–Liciboy	+ 0"
3	Flober Peña (COL)	Boyacá se Atreve–Liciboy	+ 6"
4	Edwin Sánchez (COL)	Formesan–Bogotá Humana–ETB	+ 6"
5	William Valencia (COL)	Coldeportes–Claro	+ 6"
6	Alejandro Serna (COL)	Gobernación de Santander–Indersantander	+ 6"
7	Óscar Sevilla (ESP)	EPM–UNE–Área Metropolitana	+ 47"
8	Miguel Ángel Rubiano (COL)	Colombia	+ 47"
9	Félix Cárdenas (COL)	Formesan–Bogotá Humana–ETB	+ 47"
10	Jarlinson Pantano (COL)	Colombia	+ 47"

General classification after stage 2
Rank	Rider	Team	Time
1	Alexis Camacho (COL)	Boyacá se Atreve–Liciboy	3h 23' 11"
2	Flober Peña (COL)	Boyacá se Atreve–Liciboy	+ 8"
3	Edwin Sánchez (COL)	Formesan–Bogotá Humana–ETB	+ 16"
4	Jeffry Romero (COL)	Colombia	+ 24"
5	Juan Pablo Suárez (COL)	EPM–UNE–Área Metropolitana	+ 43"
6	Óscar Sevilla (ESP)	EPM–UNE–Área Metropolitana	+ 45"
7	Camilo Castiblanco (COL)	EPM–UNE–Área Metropolitana	+ 45"
8	Walter Pedraza (COL)	EPM–UNE–Área Metropolitana	+ 45"
9	Jaime Castañeda (COL)	EPM–UNE–Área Metropolitana	+ 49"
10	Omar Mendoza (COL)	Movistar Team América	+ 49"

=== Stage 3 ===
8 August 2014 – Barbosa to Tunja, 123 km (76 mi)

Stage 3 result
Rank	Rider	Team	Time
1	Weimar Roldán (COL)	EPM–UNE–Área Metropolitana	3h 26' 03"
2	Miguel Ángel Rubiano (COL)	Colombia	+ 3"
3	Rafael Montiel (COL)	Aguardiente Antioqueño–Lotería de Medellín–IDEA	+ 1' 04"
4	Luis Felipe Laverde (COL)	Coldeportes–Claro	+ 1' 11"
5	Pedro Herrera (COL)	Formesan–Bogotá Humana–ETB	+ 1' 44"
6	Óscar Soliz (BOL)	Movistar Team América	+ 2' 31"
7	Wilson Marentes (COL)	Formesan–Bogotá Humana–ETB	+ 3' 08"
8	Rodolfo Torres (COL)	Colombia	+ 3' 12"
9	Óscar Sevilla (ESP)	EPM–UNE–Área Metropolitana	+ 3' 16"
10	Félix Cárdenas (COL)	Formesan–Bogotá Humana–ETB	+ 3' 16"

General classification after stage 3
Rank	Rider	Team	Time
1	Miguel Ángel Rubiano (COL)	Colombia	6h 50' 53"
2	Rafael Montiel (COL)	Aguardiente Antioqueño–Lotería de Medellín–IDEA	+ 53"
3	Luis Felipe Laverde (COL)	Coldeportes–Claro	+ 1' 16"
4	Pedro Herrera (COL)	Formesan–Bogotá Humana–ETB	+ 2' 01"
5	Alexis Camacho (COL)	Boyacá se Atreve–Liciboy	+ 2' 06"
6	Flober Peña (COL)	Boyacá se Atreve–Liciboy	+ 2' 14"
7	Jeffry Romero (COL)	Colombia	+ 2' 30"
8	Weimar Roldán (COL)	EPM–UNE–Área Metropolitana	+ 2' 43"
9	Juan Pablo Suárez (COL)	EPM–UNE–Área Metropolitana	+ 2' 49"
10	Óscar Sevilla (ESP)	EPM–UNE–Área Metropolitana	+ 2' 51"

=== Stage 4 ===
9 August 2014 — Nobsa to Cota, 198 km (123 mi)

Stage 4 result
Rank	Rider	Team	Time
1	José Jaimes (COL)	Gobernación de Santander–Indersantander	4h 31' 19"
2	Jeffry Romero (COL)	Colombia	+ 0"
3	Julián Atehortúa (COL)	GW–Shimano	+ 0"
4	Jaime Castañeda (COL)	EPM–UNE–Área Metropolitana	+ 0"
5	Fabio Chinello (ITA)	Area Zero Pro Team	+ 0"
6	Marco Zamparella (ITA)	Movistar Team América	+ 0"
7	Jairo Salas (COL)	Aguardiente Antioqueño–Lotería de Medellín–IDEA	+ 0"
8	Meron Amanuel (ERI)	Bike Aid–Ride for Help	+ 0"
9	Félix Barón (COL)	Formesan–Bogotá Humana–ETB	+ 0"
10	Jefferson Vargas (COL)	Super Giros–Blanco del Valle–Redetrans	+ 0"

General classification after stage 4
Rank	Rider	Team	Time
1	Miguel Ángel Rubiano (COL)	Colombia	11h 22' 12"
2	Rafael Montiel (COL)	Aguardiente Antioqueño–Lotería de Medellín–IDEA	+ 53"
3	Luis Felipe Laverde (COL)	Coldeportes–Claro	+ 1' 16"
4	Pedro Herrera (COL)	Formesan–Bogotá Humana–ETB	+ 2' 01"
5	Alexis Camacho (COL)	Boyacá se Atreve–Liciboy	+ 2' 06"
6	Flober Peña (COL)	Boyacá se Atreve–Liciboy	+ 2' 14"
7	Jeffry Romero (COL)	Colombia	+ 2' 24"
8	Weimar Roldán (COL)	EPM–UNE–Área Metropolitana	+ 2' 43"
9	Juan Pablo Suárez (COL)	EPM–UNE–Área Metropolitana	+ 2' 49"
10	Óscar Sevilla (ESP)	EPM–UNE–Área Metropolitana	+ 2' 51"

=== Stage 5 ===
10 August 2014 — Madrid to Ibagué, 202 km (126 mi)

Stage 5 result
Rank	Rider	Team	Time
1	Óscar Sevilla (ESP)	EPM–UNE–Área Metropolitana	4h 36' 59"
2	Flober Peña (COL)	Boyacá se Atreve–Liciboy	+ 0"
3	Robinson Chalapud (COL)	Colombia	+ 8"
4	Alex Cano (COL)	Aguardiente Antioqueño–Lotería de Medellín–IDEA	+ 8"
5	Aldemar Reyes (COL)	GW–Shimano	+ 8"
6	Danny Osorio (COL)	Super Giros–Blanco del Valle–Redetrans	+ 8"
7	Freddy Montaña (COL)	Movistar Team América	+ 8"
8	Víctor Niño (COL)	Aguardiente Néctar–Cundinamarca Calidad de Vida	+ 8"
9	Walter Pedraza (COL)	EPM–UNE–Área Metropolitana	+ 8"
10	Michael Rodríguez (COL)	EBSA–Indeportes Boyacá	+ 8"

General classification after stage 5
Rank	Rider	Team	Time
1	Miguel Ángel Rubiano (COL)	Colombia	15h 59' 19"
2	Rafael Montiel (COL)	Aguardiente Antioqueño–Lotería de Medellín–IDEA	+ 53"
3	Luis Felipe Laverde (COL)	Coldeportes–Claro	+ 1' 16"
4	Flober Peña (COL)	Boyacá se Atreve–Liciboy	+ 2' 00"
5	Alexis Camacho (COL)	Boyacá se Atreve–Liciboy	+ 2' 06"
6	Pedro Herrera (COL)	Formesan–Bogotá Humana–ETB	+ 2' 26"
7	Óscar Sevilla (ESP)	EPM–UNE–Área Metropolitana	+ 2' 33"
8	Jeffry Romero (COL)	Colombia	+ 2' 38"
9	Juan Pablo Suárez (COL)	EPM–UNE–Área Metropolitana	+ 2' 49"
10	Walter Pedraza (COL)	EPM–UNE–Área Metropolitana	+ 2' 51"

=== Stage 6 ===
11 August 2014 – Ibagué to Pereira, 158 km (98 mi)

Stage 6 result
Rank	Rider	Team	Time
1	Alexis Camacho (COL)	Boyacá se Atreve–Liciboy	4h 19' 07"
2	Félix Cárdenas (COL)	Formesan–Bogotá Humana–ETB	+ 7"
3	Óscar Sevilla (ESP)	EPM–UNE–Área Metropolitana	+ 7"
4	Jarlinson Pantano (COL)	Colombia	+ 7"
5	Alejandro Serna (COL)	Gobernación de Santander–Indersantander	+ 7"
6	Miguel Ángel Rubiano (COL)	Colombia	+ 7"
7	Walter Pedraza (COL)	EPM–UNE–Área Metropolitana	+ 7"
8	Rafael Montiel (COL)	Aguardiente Antioqueño–Lotería de Medellín–IDEA	+ 7"
9	Luis Felipe Laverde (COL)	Coldeportes–Claro	+ 7"
10	Flober Peña (COL)	Boyacá se Atreve–Liciboy	+ 7"

General classification after stage 6
Rank	Rider	Team	Time
1	Miguel Ángel Rubiano (COL)	Colombia	20h 18' 33"
2	Rafael Montiel (COL)	Aguardiente Antioqueño–Lotería de Medellín–IDEA	+ 53"
3	Luis Felipe Laverde (COL)	Coldeportes–Claro	+ 1' 16"
4	Alexis Camacho (COL)	Boyacá se Atreve–Liciboy	+ 1' 49"
5	Flober Peña (COL)	Boyacá se Atreve–Liciboy	+ 2' 00"
6	Óscar Sevilla (ESP)	EPM–UNE–Área Metropolitana	+ 2' 27"
7	Walter Pedraza (COL)	EPM–UNE–Área Metropolitana	+ 2' 48"
8	Juan Pablo Suárez (COL)	EPM–UNE–Área Metropolitana	+ 2' 49"
9	Javier Alberto González (COL)	Boyacá se Atreve–Liciboy	+ 2' 59"
10	Freddy Montaña (COL)	Movistar Team América	+ 3' 10"

=== Stage 7 ===
13 August 2014 — Dosquebradas to Dosquebradas, 196 km (122 mi)

Stage 7 result
Rank	Rider	Team	Time
1	Andrea Pasqualon (ITA)	Area Zero Pro Team	4h 18' 16"
2	Óscar Sevilla (ESP)	EPM–UNE–Área Metropolitana	+ 0"
3	Fabio Chinello (ITA)	Area Zero Pro Team	+ 0"
4	Jaime Castañeda (COL)	EPM–UNE–Área Metropolitana	+ 0"
5	Diego Mancipe (COL)	Lotería de Boyacá	+ 0"
6	Juan Martín Mesa (COL)	Coldeportes–Claro	+ 0"
7	Miguel Ángel Rubiano (COL)	Colombia	+ 0"
8	Dalivier Ospina (COL)	Super Giros–Blanco del Valle–Redetrans	+ 0"
9	Jairo Salas (COL)	Aguardiente Antioqueño–Lotería de Medellín–IDEA	+ 0"
10	Marco Zamparella (ITA)	Movistar Team América	+ 0"

General classification after stage 7
Rank	Rider	Team	Time
1	Miguel Ángel Rubiano (COL)	Colombia	24h 36' 49"
2	Rafael Montiel (COL)	Aguardiente Antioqueño–Lotería de Medellín–IDEA	+ 53"
3	Luis Felipe Laverde (COL)	Coldeportes–Claro	+ 1' 16"
4	Alexis Camacho (COL)	Boyacá se Atreve–Liciboy	+ 1' 49"
5	Flober Peña (COL)	Boyacá se Atreve–Liciboy	+ 2' 00"
6	Óscar Sevilla (ESP)	EPM–UNE–Área Metropolitana	+ 2' 21"
7	Walter Pedraza (COL)	EPM–UNE–Área Metropolitana	+ 2' 48"
8	Juan Pablo Suárez (COL)	EPM–UNE–Área Metropolitana	+ 2' 49"
9	Javier Alberto González (COL)	Boyacá se Atreve–Liciboy	+ 2' 59"
10	Freddy Montaña (COL)	Movistar Team América	+ 3' 10"

=== Stage 8 ===
14 August 2014 – Pereira to Manizales, 199 km (124 mi)

Stage 8 result
Rank	Rider	Team	Time
1	Félix Cárdenas (COL)	Formesan–Bogotá Humana–ETB	5h 09' 45"
2	Óscar Soliz (BOL)	Movistar Team América	+ 6"
3	Óscar Sevilla (ESP)	EPM–UNE–Área Metropolitana	+ 9"
4	Flober Peña (COL)	Boyacá se Atreve–Liciboy	+ 9"
5	Walter Pedraza (COL)	EPM–UNE–Área Metropolitana	+ 9"
6	Luis Felipe Laverde (COL)	Coldeportes–Claro	+ 9"
7	Víctor Niño (COL)	Aguardiente Néctar–Cundinamarca Calidad de Vida	+ 14"
8	Danny Osorio (COL)	Super Giros–Blanco del Valle–Redetrans	+ 15"
9	Mauricio Ortega (COL)	Aguardiente Antioqueño–Lotería de Medellín–IDEA	+ 15"
10	Alexis Camacho (COL)	Boyacá se Atreve–Liciboy	+ 15"

General classification after stage 8
Rank	Rider	Team	Time
1	Miguel Ángel Rubiano (COL)	Colombia	29h 47' 21"
2	Luis Felipe Laverde (COL)	Coldeportes–Claro	+ 38"
3	Alexis Camacho (COL)	Boyacá se Atreve–Liciboy	+ 1' 17"
4	Flober Peña (COL)	Boyacá se Atreve–Liciboy	+ 1' 22"
5	Óscar Sevilla (ESP)	EPM–UNE–Área Metropolitana	+ 1' 39"
6	Rafael Montiel (COL)	Aguardiente Antioqueño–Lotería de Medellín–IDEA	+ 2' 02"
7	Walter Pedraza (COL)	EPM–UNE–Área Metropolitana	+ 2' 10"
8	Juan Pablo Suárez (COL)	EPM–UNE–Área Metropolitana	+ 2' 23"
9	Óscar Soliz (BOL)	Movistar Team América	+ 2' 28"
10	Félix Cárdenas (COL)	Formesan–Bogotá Humana–ETB	+ 2' 30"

=== Stage 9 ===
15 August 2014 – Manizales to La Estrella, 182 km (113 mi)

Stage 9 result
Rank	Rider	Team	Time
1	Fernando Camargo (COL)	Boyacá se Atreve–Liciboy	4h 22' 00"
2	Óscar Soliz (BOL)	Movistar Team América	+ 33"
3	Óscar Sevilla (ESP)	EPM–UNE–Área Metropolitana	+ 33"
4	Didier Chaparro (COL)	Fuerzas Armadas–Ejército Nacional	+ 34"
5	Flober Peña (COL)	Boyacá se Atreve–Liciboy	+ 39"
6	Mauricio Ortega (COL)	Aguardiente Antioqueño–Lotería de Medellín–IDEA	+ 39"
7	Freddy Montaña (COL)	Movistar Team América	+ 45"
8	Aldemar Reyes (COL)	GW–Shimano	+ 47"
9	Danny Osorio (COL)	Super Giros–Blanco del Valle–Redetrans	+ 52"
10	Miguel Ángel Rubiano (COL)	Colombia	+ 53"

General classification after stage 9
Rank	Rider	Team	Time
1	Miguel Ángel Rubiano (COL)	Colombia	34h 10' 14"
2	Flober Peña (COL)	Boyacá se Atreve–Liciboy	+ 1' 08"
3	Óscar Sevilla (ESP)	EPM–UNE–Área Metropolitana	+ 1' 12"
4	Alexis Camacho (COL)	Boyacá se Atreve–Liciboy	+ 1' 25"
5	Óscar Soliz (BOL)	Movistar Team América	+ 2' 02"
6	Juan Pablo Suárez (COL)	EPM–UNE–Área Metropolitana	+ 2' 31"
7	Fernando Camargo (COL)	Boyacá se Atreve–Liciboy	+ 2' 38"
8	Freddy Montaña (COL)	Movistar Team América	+ 2' 41"
9	Mauricio Ortega (COL)	Aguardiente Antioqueño–Lotería de Medellín–IDEA	+ 2' 49"
10	Danny Osorio (COL)	Super Giros–Blanco del Valle–Redetrans	+ 2' 57"

=== Stage 10 ===
16 August 2014 — Medellín to Alto de Las Palmas, 17 km (11 mi), individual time trial (ITT)

Stage 10 result
Rank	Rider	Team	Time
1	Álvaro Gómez (COL)	Aguardiente Néctar–Cundinamarca Calidad de Vida	42' 20"
2	Salvador Moreno (COL)	Coldeportes–Claro	+ 9"
3	Fernando Camargo (COL)	Boyacá se Atreve–Liciboy	+ 13"
4	Francisco Colorado (COL)	Super Giros–Blanco del Valle–Redetrans	+ 22"
5	Óscar Rivera (COL)	EBSA–Indeportes Boyacá	+ 1' 03"
6	Mauricio Ortega (COL)	Aguardiente Antioqueño–Lotería de Medellín–IDEA	+ 1' 09"
7	Juan Pablo Wilches (COL)	Aguardiente Néctar–Cundinamarca Calidad de Vida	+ 1' 23"
8	Félix Cárdenas (COL)	Formesan–Bogotá Humana–ETB	+ 1' 24"
9	Óscar Sevilla (ESP)	EPM–UNE–Área Metropolitana	+ 1' 41"
10	Robinson Chalapud (COL)	Colombia	+ 1' 46"

General classification after stage 10
Rank	Rider	Team	Time
1	Fernando Camargo (COL)	Boyacá se Atreve–Liciboy	34h 55' 25"
2	Óscar Sevilla (ESP)	EPM–UNE–Área Metropolitana	+ 2"
3	Alexis Camacho (COL)	Boyacá se Atreve–Liciboy	+ 52"
4	Mauricio Ortega (COL)	Aguardiente Antioqueño–Lotería de Medellín–IDEA	+ 1' 07"
5	Freddy Montaña (COL)	Movistar Team América	+ 1' 50"
6	Danny Osorio (COL)	Super Giros–Blanco del Valle–Redetrans	+ 1' 57"
7	Óscar Soliz (BOL)	Movistar Team América	+ 1' 58"
8	Juan Pablo Suárez (COL)	EPM–UNE–Área Metropolitana	+ 2' 12"
9	Flober Peña (COL)	Boyacá se Atreve–Liciboy	+ 2' 17"
10	Miguel Ángel Rubiano (COL)	Colombia	+ 3' 22"

=== Stage 11 ===
17 August 2014 – Medellín to Medellín, 103 km (64 mi)

Stage 11 result
Rank	Rider	Team	Time
1	Jairo Salas (COL)	Aguardiente Antioqueño–Lotería de Medellín–IDEA	2h 06' 10"
2	Fabio Chinello (ITA)	Area Zero Pro Team	+ 0"
3	Andrea Pasqualon (ITA)	Area Zero Pro Team	+ 0"
4	José Jaimes (COL)	Gobernación de Santander–Indersantander	+ 0"
5	Carlos Quintero (COL)	Colombia	+ 0"
6	Jaime Castañeda (COL)	EPM–UNE–Área Metropolitana	+ 0"
7	Félix Cárdenas (COL)	Formesan–Bogotá Humana–ETB	+ 0"
8	Marco Zamparella (ITA)	Movistar Team América	+ 0"
9	Cristián Talero (COL)	Movistar Team América	+ 0"
10	Mekseb Debesay (ERI)	Bike Aid–Ride for Help	+ 0"

Final general classification
Rank	Rider	Team	Time
1	Óscar Sevilla (ESP)	EPM–UNE–Área Metropolitana	37h 01' 34"
2	Fernando Camargo (COL)	Boyacá se Atreve–Liciboy	+ 1"
3	Alexis Camacho (COL)	Boyacá se Atreve–Liciboy	+ 53"
4	Mauricio Ortega (COL)	Aguardiente Antioqueño–Lotería de Medellín–IDEA	+ 1' 08"
5	Freddy Montaña (COL)	Movistar Team América	+ 1' 51"
6	Danny Osorio (COL)	Super Giros–Blanco del Valle–Redetrans	+ 1' 58"
7	Óscar Soliz (BOL)	Movistar Team América	+ 1' 59"
8	Juan Pablo Suárez (COL)	EPM–UNE–Área Metropolitana	+ 2' 12"
9	Flober Peña (COL)	Boyacá se Atreve–Liciboy	+ 2' 18"
10	Miguel Ángel Rubiano (COL)	Colombia	+ 3' 23"
