= 2014 Tour de Langkawi =

2013–14 UCI Asia Tour, race 19 of 41

Race details
- Dates: 27 February–8 March 2014
- Stages: 10
- Distance: 1,507.9 km (937.0 mi)
- Winning time: 35h 07' 16"

Results
Jersey awarded to the overall winner	Winner	Samad Pourseyedi (IRI)	(Tabriz Petrochemical Team)
	Second	Merhawi Kudus (ERI)	(MTN-Qhubeka)
	Third	Isaac Bolivar (COL)	(UnitedHealthcare)
Jersey awarded to the points classification winner	Points	Aidis Kruopis (LTU)	(Orica–GreenEDGE)
Jersey awarded to the mountains classification winner	Mountains	Matt Brammeier (IRL)	(Synergy Baku Cycling Project)
Jersey awarded to the team classification winner	Team	MTN-Qhubeka	

The 2014 Tour de Langkawi was the 19th edition of an annual professional road bicycle racing stage race held in Malaysia since 1996. The race was run at the highest category (apart from those races which make up the UCI World Tour, and was rated by the Union Cycliste Internationale (UCI) as a 2.HC (hors category) race as part of the UCI Asia Tour.

== Teams ==
21 teams accepted invitations to participate in the 2013 Tour de Langkawi. Six UCI ProTeams were invited to the race, along with five UCI Professional Continental and seven UCI Continental teams. The field was completed by three national selection teams.

UCI ProTour teams

- Astana
- Belkin Pro Cycling
- Team Europcar
- Team Katusha
- Orica–GreenEDGE
- Tinkoff–Saxo

UCI Professional Continental teams

- Androni Giocattoli–Venezuela
- Colombia
- Drapac Professional Cycling
- MTN–Qhubeka
- UnitedHealthcare

UCI Continental teams

- Aisan Racing Team
- CCN
- Giant-Champion System Pro
- OCBC Singapore Continental Cycling Team
- Synergy Baku
- Tabriz Petrochemical Team
- Terengganu Cycling Team

National teams

- Indonesia
- Malaysia
- Hong Kong – China

== Stages ==
The race comprises 10 stages, covering 1495.9 kilometres.

Stage	Date	Course	Distance	Stage result		
Stage	Date	Course	Distance	Winner	Second	Third
Stage 1	27 February	Langkawi (Porto Malai) – Langkawi (Pantai Chenang)	101.1 km (63 mi)	Dúber Quintero; Colombia	(Republic of Ireland) Matt Brammeier; Synergy Baku Cycling Project	(Australia) Jonathan Clarke; UnitedHealthcare
Stage 2	28 February	Sungai Petani – Taiping	132.5 km (82 mi)	(Netherlands) Theo Bos; Belkin Pro Cycling	(Netherlands) Graeme Brown; Belkin Pro Cycling	(Austria) Marco Haller; Team Katusha
Stage 3	1 March	Kampar – Kuala Lumpur	166.5 km (103 mi)	(Italy) Andrea Guardini; Astana	(Netherlands) Theo Bos; Belkin Pro Cycling	(France) Yannick Martinez; Team Europcar
Stage 4	2 March	Subang – Genting Highlands	110.9 km (69 mi)	(Iran) Samad Pourseyedi; Tabriz Petrochemical Team	(Eritrea) Merhawi Kudus; MTN–Qhubeka	(Colombia) Isaac Bolivar; UnitedHealthcare
Stage 5	3 March	Karak – Rembau	139.3 km (87 mi)	(United States) Bradley White; UnitedHealthcare	(Netherlands) Thomas Rabou; OCBC Singapore Continental Cycling Team	(South Africa) Louis Meintjes; MTN–Qhubeka
Stage 6	4 March	Melaka – Pontian	199.1 km (124 mi)	(Netherlands) Kenny van Hummel; Androni Giocattoli–Venezuela	(Lithuania) Aidis Kruopis; Orica–GreenEDGE	(United States) Ken Hanson; UnitedHealthcare
Stage 7	5 March	Kota Tinggi – Pekan	225 km (140 mi)	(Netherlands) Theo Bos; Belkin Pro Cycling	(Lithuania) Aidis Kruopis; Orica–GreenEDGE	Leonardo Duque; Colombia
Stage 8	6 March	Kuantan – Marang	202.6 km (126 mi)	(Netherlands) Theo Bos; Belkin Pro Cycling	(Italy) Andrea Guardini; Astana	(Netherlands) Kenny van Hummel; Androni Giocattoli–Venezuela
Stage 9	7 March	Bandar Permaisuri – Kuala Terengganu	111.1 km (69 mi)	(Netherlands) Theo Bos; Belkin Pro Cycling	(Italy) Andrea Guardini; Astana	(Lithuania) Aidis Kruopis; Orica–GreenEDGE
Stage 10	8 March	Tasik Kenyir – Kuala Terengganu	114.7 km (71 mi)	(Italy) Andrea Guardini; Astana	(Lithuania) Aidis Kruopis; Orica–GreenEDGE	(Italy) Francesco Chicchi; Yellow Fluo

== Classification leadership ==
Stage	Winner	General classification	Points classification	Mountains classification	Asian rider classification	Team classification	Asian team classification
1	Dúber Quintero	Dúber Quintero	Dúber Quintero	Matt Brammeier	Goh Choon Huat	Colombia	Terengganu Cycling Team
2	Theo Bos	Dúber Quintero	Dúber Quintero	Matt Brammeier	Goh Choon Huat	Colombia	Terengganu Cycling Team
3	Andrea Guardini	Dúber Quintero	Matt Brammeier	Matt Brammeier	Goh Choon Huat	Colombia	Terengganu Cycling Team
4	Samad Pourseyedi	Samad Pourseyedi	Matt Brammeier	Matt Brammeier	Samad Pourseyedi	MTN–Qhubeka	Tabriz Petrochemical CCN Team
5	Bradley White	Samad Pourseyedi	Thomas Rabou	Matt Brammeier	Samad Pourseyedi	MTN–Qhubeka	Tabriz Petrochemical CCN Team
6	Kenny van Hummel	Samad Pourseyedi	Thomas Rabou	Matt Brammeier	Samad Pourseyedi	MTN–Qhubeka	Tabriz Petrochemical CCN Team
7	Theo Bos	Samad Pourseyedi	Aidis Kruopis	Matt Brammeier	Samad Pourseyedi	MTN–Qhubeka	Tabriz Petrochemical CCN Team
8	Theo Bos	Samad Pourseyedi	Aidis Kruopis	Matt Brammeier	Samad Pourseyedi	MTN–Qhubeka	Tabriz Petrochemical CCN Team
9	Theo Bos	Samad Pourseyedi	Aidis Kruopis	Matt Brammeier	Samad Pourseyedi	MTN–Qhubeka	Tabriz Petrochemical CCN Team
10	Andrea Guardini	Samad Pourseyedi	Aidis Kruopis	Matt Brammeier	Samad Pourseyedi	MTN–Qhubeka	Tabriz Petrochemical CCN Team
Final		Samad Pourseyedi	Aidis Kruopis	Matt Brammeier	Samad Pourseyedi	MTN–Qhubeka	Tabriz Petrochemical CCN Team

== Final standings ==
=== General classification ===
Final general classification (1–10)
	Rider	Team	Time
1	Samad Pourseyedi (IRI)	Tabriz Petrochemical Team	35h 07' 16"
2	Merhawi Kudus (ERI)	MTN–Qhubeka	+ 0' 8"
3	Isaac Bolivar (COL)	UnitedHealthcare	+ 0' 11"
4	Esteban Chaves (COL)	Orica–GreenEDGE	+ 0' 20"
5	Petr Ignatenko (RUS)	Team Katusha	+ 0' 36"
6	Jacques Janse van Rensburg (RSA)	MTN–Qhubeka	+ 0' 40"
7	Steven Kruijswijk (NED)	Belkin Pro Cycling	+ 0' 52"
8	Gianfranco Zilioli (ITA)	Androni Giocattoli–Venezuela	+ 1' 09"
9	Ghaffari Vahid (IRI)	Tabriz Petrochemical Team	+ 1' 27"
10	Carlos Quintero (COL)	Colombia	+ 1' 37"

=== Points classification ===
	Rider	Team	Points
1	Aidis Kruopis (LTU)	Orica–GreenEDGE	98
2	Andrea Guardini (ITA)	Astana	85
2	Michael Kolar (SVK)	Tinkoff–Saxo	85
4	Theo Bos (NED)	Belkin Pro Cycling	80
5	Kenny van Hummel (NED)	Androni Giocattoli–Venezuela	68
6	Francesco Chicchi (ITA)	Yellow Fluo	64
7	Robert Forster (GER)	UnitedHealthcare	51
8	Youcef Reguigui (ALG)	MTN–Qhubeka	48
9	Matt Brammeier (IRL)	Synergy Baku Cycling Project	43
10	Elchin Asadov (AZE)	Synergy Baku Cycling Project	42

=== Mountains classification ===
	Rider	Team	Points
1	Matt Brammeier (IRL)	Synergy Baku Cycling Project	34
2	Isaac Bolivar (COL)	UnitedHealthcare	31
3	Samad Pourseyedi (IRI)	Tabriz Petrochemical Team	25
4	Merhawi Kudus (ERI)	MTN–Qhubeka	20
5	Yonnatta Monsalve (VEN)	Yellow Fluo	17
6	Ghaffari Vahid (IRI)	Tabriz Petrochemical Team	16
7	Elchin Asadov (AZE)	Synergy Baku Cycling Project	14
8	Esteban Chaves (COL)	Orica–GreenEDGE	12
8	Steven Kruijswijk (NED)	Belkin Pro Cycling	12
8	Ariya Phounsavath (LAO)	CCN Cycling Team	12
11	Petr Ignatenko (RUS)	Team Katusha	11
12	Jacques Janse van Rensburg (RSA)	MTN–Qhubeka	9

=== Asian rider classification ===
	Rider	Team	Time
1	Samad Pourseyedi (IRI)	Tabriz Petrochemical Team	35h 07' 16"
2	Ghaffari Vahid (IRI)	Tabriz Petrochemical Team	+ 01' 27"
3	Amir Kolahdozhagh (IRI)	Tabriz Petrochemical Team	+ 03' 23"
4	Ariya Phounsavath (LAO)	CCN Cycling Team	+ 03' 29"
5	Hari Fitrianto (INA)	CCN Cycling Team	+ 09' 26"
6	Adiq Husainie Othman (MAS)	Terengganu Cycling Team	+ 10' 35"
7	Muhammad Fauzan Ahmad Lutfi (MAS)	Malaysia	+ 11' 06"
8	Ghader Mizbani Iranagh (IRI)	Tabriz Petrochemical Team	+ 12' 03"
9	Mehdi Sohrabi (IRI)	Tabriz Petrochemical Team	+ 12' 08"
10	Cheung King Wai (HKG)	Hong Kong – China	+ 12' 39"

=== Team classification ===
	Team	Time
1	MTN–Qhubeka	105h 24' 35"
2	Tabriz Petrochemical Team	+ 1' 38"
3	Androni Giocattoli–Venezuela	+ 8' 52"
4	Colombia	+ 9' 59"
5	CCN Cycling Team	+ 11' 14"
6	Team Katusha	+ 11' 23"
7	Orica–GreenEDGE	+ 12' 24"
8	UnitedHealthcare	+ 14' 33"
9	Belkin Pro Cycling	+ 26' 49"
10	Giant-Champion System Pro	+ 27' 34"

=== Asian team classification ===
	Team	Time
1	Tabriz Petrochemical Team	105h 26' 13"
2	Giant-Champion System Pro	+ 25' 56"
3	Indonesia	+ 33' 05"
4	Malaysia	+ 33' 47"
5	Terengganu Cycling Team	+ 43' 16"
6	Hong Kong – China	+ 43' 56"
7	Astana	+ 1h 10' 05"
8	Aisan Racing Team	+ 1h 14' 40"

== Stage results ==
=== Stage 1 ===
27 February 2014 — Langkawi(Porto Malai) to Langkawi (Pantai Chenang), 101.1 km (62.8 mi)

	Rider	Team	Time
1	(Colombia) Dúber Quintero	Colombia	2h 21' 40"
2	(Republic of Ireland) Matt Brammeier	Synergy Baku	+ 0"
3	(Australia) Jonathan Clarke	UnitedHealthcare	+ 0"
4	(Singapore) Goh Choon-Huat	OCBC Singapore Continental Cycling Team	+ 0"
5	(Italy) Andrea Guardini	Astana	+ 0"
6	(Malaysia) Anuar Manan	Terengganu Cycling Team	+ 0"
7	(Netherlands) Kenny van Hummel	Androni Giocattoli–Venezuela	+ 0"
8	(Slovakia) Michael Kolář	Tinkoff–Saxo	+ 0"
9	(Germany) Michael Schweizer	Synergy Baku	+ 0"
10	(Lithuania) Aidis Kruopis	Orica–GreenEDGE	+ 0"

=== Stage 2 ===
28 February 2014 — Sungai Petani to Taiping, 132.5 km (82.3 mi)

	Rider	Team	Time
1	(Netherlands) Theo Bos	Belkin Pro Cycling	3h 11' 11"
2	(Australia) Graeme Brown	Belkin Pro Cycling	+ 0"
3	(Austria) Marco Haller	Team Katusha	+ 0"
4	(Lithuania) Aidis Kruopis	Orica–GreenEDGE	+ 0"
5	(Slovakia) Michael Kolář	Tinkoff–Saxo	+ 0"
6	(New Zealand) Dene Thomas Rogers	OCBC Singapore Continental Cycling Team	+ 0"
7	(Algeria) Youcef Reguigui	MTN–Qhubeka	+ 0"
8	(Republic of Ireland) Matt Brammeier	Synergy Baku	+ 0"
9	(Japan) Taiji Nishitani	Aisan Racing Team	+ 0"
10	(Russia) Pavel Kochetkov	Team Katusha	+ 0"

=== Stage 3 ===
1 March 2014 — Kampar to Kuala Lumpur, 166.5 km (103.5 mi)

	Rider	Team	Time
1	(Italy) Andrea Guardini	Astana	03h 40' 38"
2	(Netherlands) Theo Bos	Belkin Pro Cycling	+ 0"
3	(France) Yannick Martinez	Team Europcar	+ 0"
4	(Lithuania) Aidis Kruopis	Orica–GreenEDGE	+ 0"
5	(Andorra) Kenny van Hummel	Androni Giocattoli–Venezuela	+ 0"
6	(New Zealand) Dene Thomas Rogers	OCBC Singapore Continental Cycling Team	+ 0"
7	(Italy) Francesco Chicchi	Yellow Fluo	+ 0"
8	(Germany) Daniel Klemme	Synergy Baku	+ 0"
9	(Iran) Behnam Khalili	Tabriz Petrochemical Team	+ 0"
10	(Algeria) Youcef Reguigui	MTN–Qhubeka	+ 0"

=== Stage 4 ===
2 March 2014 — Subang to Genting Highlands, 110.9 km (68.9 mi)

	Rider	Team	Time
1	(Iran) Samad Pourseyedi	Tabriz Petrochemical Team	2h 54' 44"
2	(Eritrea) Merhawi Kudus	MTN–Qhubeka	+ 0"
3	(Colombia) Isaac Bolivar	UnitedHealthcare	+ 0"
4	(Colombia) Esteban Chaves	Orica–GreenEDGE	+ 0"
5	(Russia) Petr Ignatenko	Team Katusha	+ 0"
6	(South Africa) Jacques Janse van Rensburg	MTN–Qhubeka	+ 0"
7	(Netherlands) Steven Kruijswijk	Belkin Pro Cycling	+ 0"
8	(Italy) Gianfranco Zilioli	Androni Giocattoli–Venezuela	+ 0"
9	(Iran) Vahid Ghafari	Tabriz Petrochemical Team	+ 0"
10	(Colombia) Carlos Quintero	Colombia	+ 0"

=== Stage 5 ===
3 March 2014 — Karak to Rembau, 139.3 km (86.6 mi)

	Rider	Team	Time
1	(United States) Bradley White	UnitedHealthcare	+ 03h 03' 28"
2	(Netherlands) Thomas Rabou	OCBC Singapore Continental Cycling Team	+ 0"
3	(South Africa) Louis Meintjes	MTN–Qhubeka	+ 0"
4	(Slovakia) Michael Kolář	Tinkoff–Saxo	+ 0"
5	(New Zealand) Dene Thomas Rogers	OCBC Singapore Continental Cycling Team	+ 0"
6	(Italy) Omar Bertazzo	Androni Giocattoli–Venezuela	+ 0"
7	(Netherlands) Kenny van Hummel	Androni Giocattoli–Venezuela	+ 0"
8	(Algeria) Youcef Reguigui	Androni Giocattoli–Venezuela	+ 0"
9	(Russia) Alexandr Kolobnev	Team Katusha	+ 0"
10	(Germany) Daniel Klemme	Synergy Baku	+ 0"

=== Stage 6 ===
4 March 2014 — Melaka to Pontian, 199.1 km (123.7 mi)

	Rider	Team	Time
1	(Netherlands) Kenny van Hummel	Androni Giocattoli–Venezuela	3h 59' 44"
2	(Lithuania) Aidis Kruopis	Orica–GreenEDGE	+ 0"
3	(United States) Ken Hanson	UnitedHealthcare	+ 0"
4	(Germany) Robert Förster	UnitedHealthcare	+ 0"
5	(Slovakia) Michael Kolář	Tinkoff–Saxo	+ 0"
6	(Italy) Francesco Chicchi	Yellow Fluo	+ 0"
7	(Italy) Andrea Guardini	Astana	+ 0"
8	(Algeria) Youcef Reguigui	MTN–Qhubeka	+ 0"
9	(France) Morgan Lamoisson	Team Europcar	+ 0"
10	(Malaysia) Anuar Manan	Terengganu Cycling Team	+ 0"

=== Stage 7 ===
5 March 2014 — Kota Tinggi to Pekan, 225 km (139.8 mi)

	Rider	Team	Time
1	(Netherlands) Theo Bos	Belkin Pro Cycling	+ 05h 33' 12"
2	(Lithuania) Aidis Kruopis	Orica–GreenEDGE	+ 0"
3	(Colombia) Leonardo Duque	Colombia	+ 0"
4	(Colombia) Carlos Alzate	Colombia	+ 0"
5	(Slovakia) Michael Kolář	Tinkoff–Saxo	+ 0"
6	(United States) Ken Hanson	UnitedHealthcare	+ 0"
7	(Germany) Robert Förster	UnitedHealthcare	+ 0"
8	(Italy) Francesco Chicchi	Yellow Fluo	+ 0"
9	(Italy) Andrea Guardini	Astana	+ 0"
10	(New Zealand) Dene Thomas Rogers	OCBC Singapore Continental Cycling Team	+ 0"

=== Stage 8 ===
6 March 2014 — Kuantan to Marang, 202.6 km (125.9 mi)

	Rider	Team	Time
1	(Netherlands) Theo Bos	Belkin Pro Cycling	5h 01' 58"
2	(Italy) Andrea Guardini	Astana	+ 0"
3	(Netherlands) Kenny van Hummel	Androni Giocattoli–Venezuela	+ 0"
4	(Slovakia) Michael Kolář	Tinkoff–Saxo	+ 0"
5	(Germany) Robert Förster	UnitedHealthcare	+ 0"
6	(Lithuania) Aidis Kruopis	Orica–GreenEDGE	+ 0"
7	(Germany) Daniel Klemme	Synergy Baku	+ 0"
8	(France) Yannick Martinez	Team Europcar	+ 0"
9	(Italy) Francesco Chicchi	Yellow Fluo	+ 0"
10	(Italy) Omar Bertazzo	Androni Giocattoli–Venezuela	+ 0"

=== Stage 9 ===
7 March 2014 — Bandar Permaisuri to Kuala Terengganu, 111.1 km (69.0 mi)

	Rider	Team	Time
1	(Netherlands) Theo Bos	Belkin Pro Cycling	+ 02h 32' 21"
2	(Italy) Andrea Guardini	Astana	+ 0"
3	(Lithuania) Aidis Kruopis	Orica–GreenEDGE	+ 0"
4	(Italy) Francesco Chicchi	Yellow Fluo	+ 0"
5	(Germany) Robert Förster	UnitedHealthcare	+ 0"
6	(Slovakia) Michael Kolář	Tinkoff–Saxo	+ 0"
7	(Colombia) Leonardo Duque	Colombia	+ 0"
8	(Italy) Omar Bertazzo	Androni Giocattoli–Venezuela	+ 0"
9	(Germany) Daniel Klemme	Synergy Baku	+ 0"
10	(Algeria) Youcef Reguigui	MTN–Qhubeka	+ 0"

=== Stage 10 ===
8 March 2014 — Tasik Kenyir to Kuala Terengganu, 114.7 km (71.3 mi)

	Rider	Team	Time
1	(Italy) Andrea Guardini	Astana	02h 15' 55"
2	(Lithuania) Aidis Kruopis	Orica–GreenEDGE	+ 0"
3	(Italy) Francesco Chicchi	Yellow Fluo	+ 0"
4	(Japan) Taiji Nishitani	Aisan Racing Team	+ 0"
5	(Netherlands) Kenny van Hummel	Androni Giocattoli–Venezuela	+ 0"
6	(Colombia) Leonardo Duque	Colombia	+ 0"
7	(Colombia) Jeffry Romero	Colombia	+ 0"
8	(France) Yannick Martinez	Team Europcar	+ 0"
9	(Algeria) Youcef Reguigui	MTN–Qhubeka	+ 0"
10	(Germany) Robert Förster	UnitedHealthcare	+ 0"
