= Frank Osorio =

Colombian bicycle racer

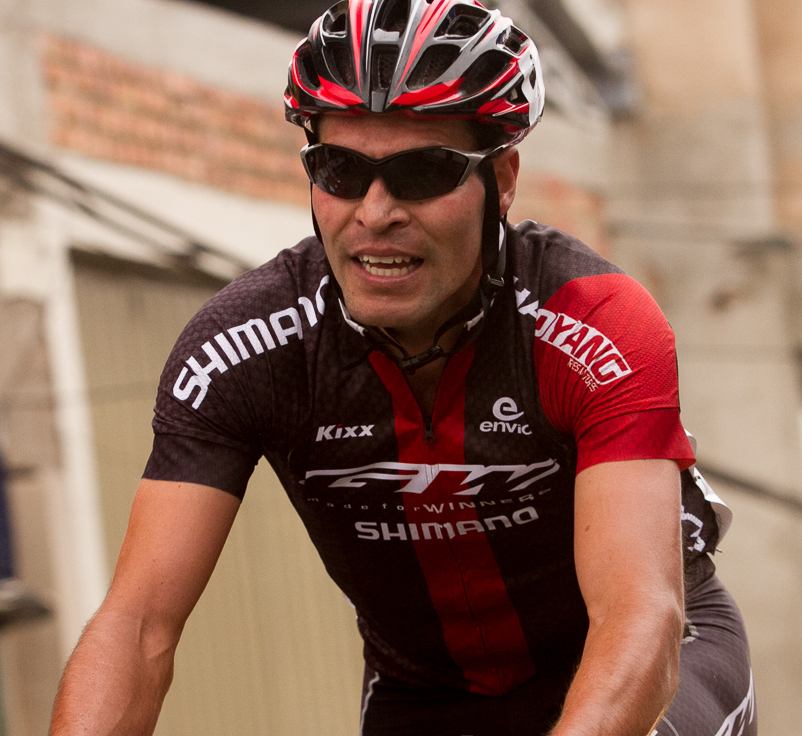
- Osorio in 2016

Personal information
- Full name: Frank Jair Osorio Carvajal
- Nickname: El Caballo
- Born: 28 August 1987 (age 39) Carmen de Viboral, Colombia

Cycling career
- Sport: Cycling
- Current team: GW Erco SportFitness
- Discipline: Road
- Role: Rider

Amateur teams
- 2011: GW–Shimano
- 2013–2015: GW–Shimano
- 2021–2022: Equipe Continental Orgullo Paisa

Professional teams
- 2012: Colombia–Coldeportes
- 2016–2018: GW–Shimano
- 2019: Coldeportes Bicicletas Strongman
- 2020: Equipe Continental Orgullo Paisa
- 2024–: GW Erco Shimano

Frank Jair Osorio Carvajal (born 28 August 1987 in Carmen de Viboral), is a Colombian cyclist, who currently rides for UCI Continental team GW Erco SportFitness.

== Major results ==
2011
1st Stage 12 Vuelta a Colombia
2016
1st Stage 8 Vuelta a Colombia
2021
4th Time trial, National Road Championships
2022
9th Time trial, National Road Championships
