= Camilo Castiblanco =

Colombian racing cyclist

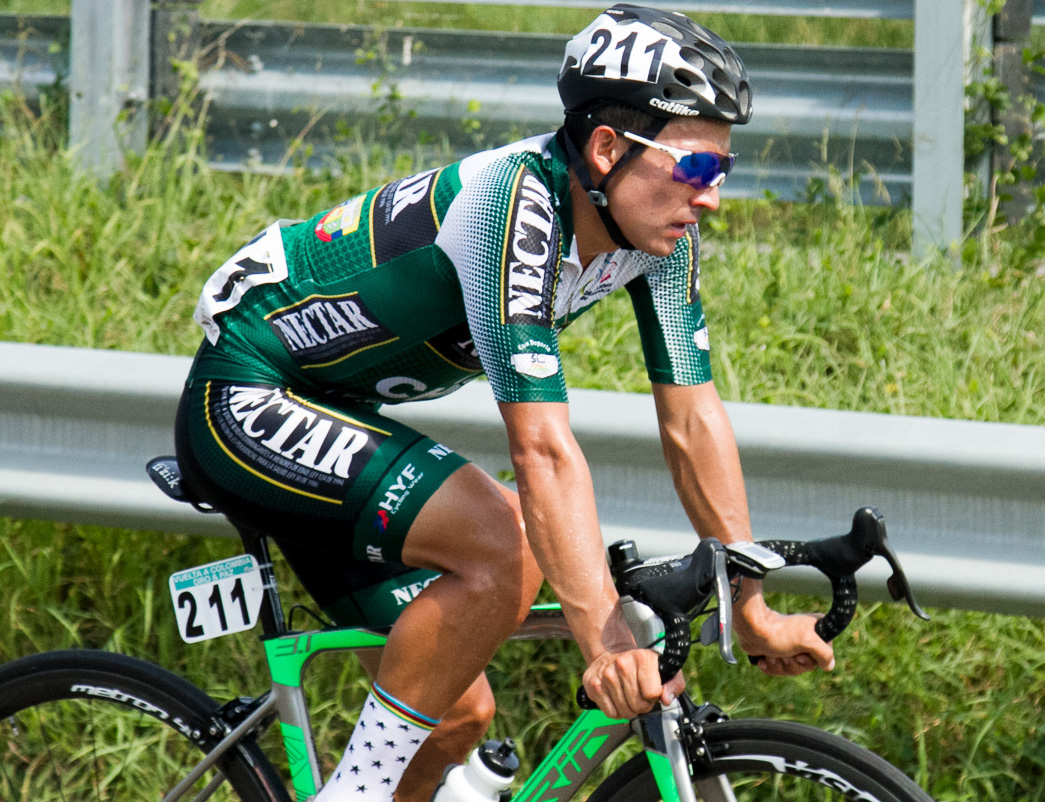
- Castiblanco in 2017.

Personal information
- Full name: Jorge Camilo Castiblanco Cubides
- Born: 24 November 1988 (age 37) Zipaquirá, Cundinamarca, Colombia

Cycling career
- Sport: Cycling
- Current team: Team Illuminate
- Discipline: Road
- Role: Rider
- Rider type: All-rounder

Amateur team
- 2014: EPM–UNE–Área Metropolitana

Professional teams
- 2010: SP Tableware
- 2012–2013: EPM–UNE
- 2015: Colombia
- 2016: GW–Shimano
- 2018–: Team Illuminate

Jorge Camilo Castiblanco Cubides (born 24 November 1988) is a Colombian road racing cyclist, who currently rides for UCI Continental team Team Illuminate.

== Major results ==
2009
8th Overall Vuelta a Bolivia
2010
5th Overall Tour of Szeklerland
2011
Vuelta Ciclista Chiapas

1st Points classification
1st Stage 1

7th Overall Vuelta a Bolivia
2013
4th Time trial, National Road Championships
4th Overall Tour do Rio

1st Stage 3

2014
1st Stage 1 (TTT) Vuelta a Colombia
2018
4th Overall Tour of Thailand
