= Flober Peña =

Colombian racing cyclist

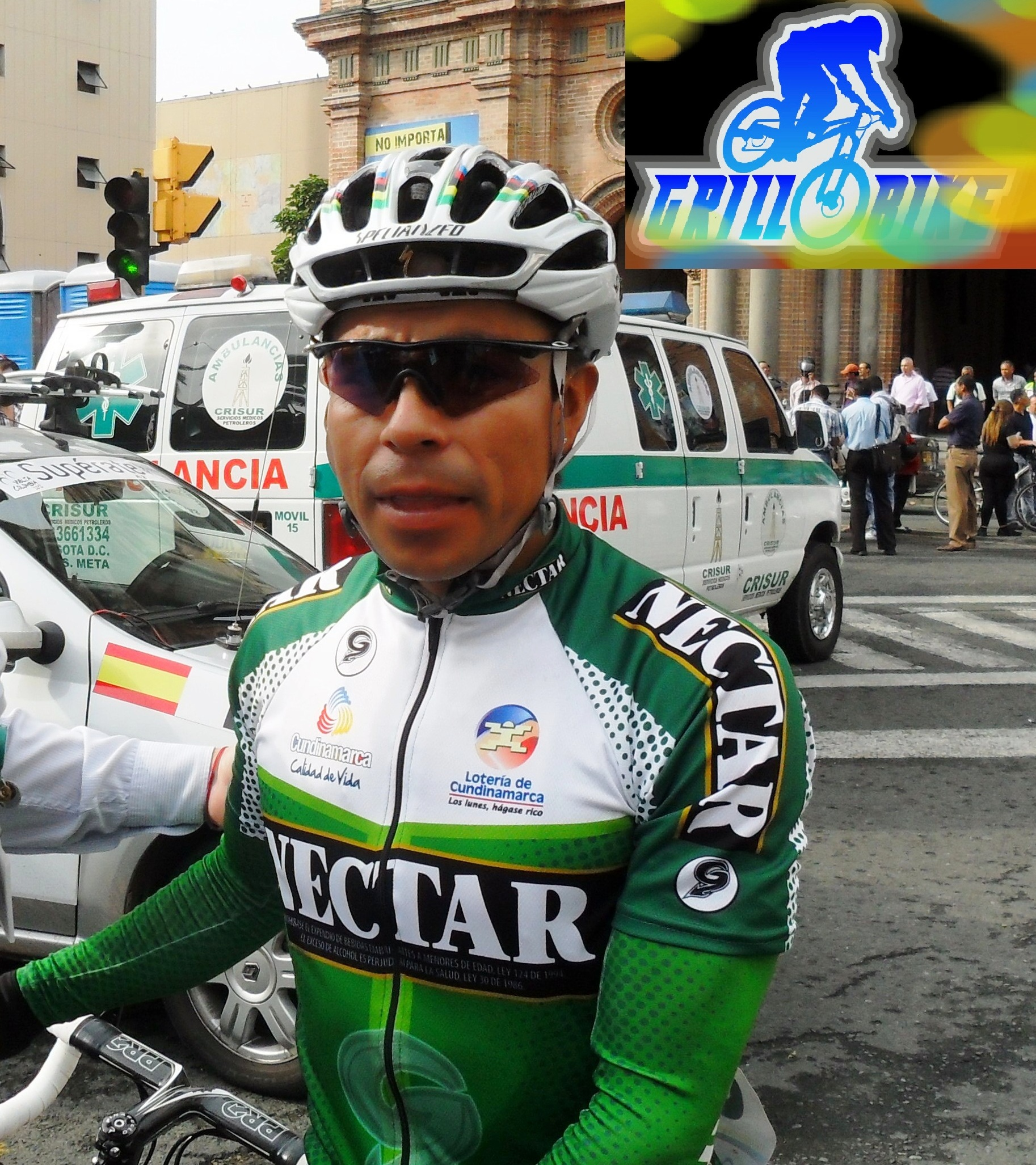
- Peña in 2012.

Personal information
- Full name: José Flober Peña Peña
- Nickname: Donatelo
- Born: 7 February 1974 (age 52) Paipa, Colombia

Cycling career
- Sport: Cycling
- Current team: Suspended
- Discipline: Road
- Role: Rider

Amateur teams
- 2012: Néctar Cundinamarca
- 2013: Coltejer–Alcaldía de Manizales
- 2014: Boyacá se atreve–LC Boyacá et Arc-en-ciel club cycliste
- 2015: Aguardiente Néctar et Arc-en-ciel club cycliste
- 2016: Union sportive lamentinoise

Professional teams
- 1997: Petróleo de Colombia
- 2016: Hainan Jilun Shakeland Cycling Team

José Flober Peña Peña (born February 7, 1974, in Paipa, Boyacá) is a professional road racing cyclist from Colombia. He was nicknamed "Donatelo" during his career.

He has been suspended from August 3, 2016, until September 25, 2020, for doping at the 2016 Tour de Guadeloupe.

== Major results ==
2004
1st Overall Tour de Guadeloupe

1st Prologue, Stages 6 & 9b

1st Stage 8 Vuelta a Guatemala
3rd Clásica de Ciclomontañismo
2005
1st Overall Tour de Guadeloupe

1st Prologue, Stages 2b & 5

2006
1st Tuta
6th Overall Tour de Guadeloupe

1st Stage 5

2007
1st Overall Tour de Guadeloupe

1st Points classification
1st Stages 2a, 2b (ITT) & 8b (ITT)

2nd Tuta
3rd Overall Clásico RCN
2008
1st Overall Tour de Guadeloupe

1st Points classification
1st Mountains classification
1st Stages 4, 5 & 6

2nd Overall Clasica del Meta
2009
2nd Overall Clásica Aguazul
4th Overall Vuelta a Boyacà
6th Overall Vuelta a Bolivia
7th Overall Vuelta Ciclista Chiapas
2012
3rd Overall Vuelta a Colombia
2014
9th Overall Vuelta a Colombia
~~2016~~
~~1st Stage 4 Tour de Guadeloupe~~
