= Bradley White =

American cyclist

Personal information
- Born: January 15, 1982 (age 44) Troy, Ohio, U.S.
- Height: 5 ft 11 in (1.80 m)
- Weight: 170 lb (77 kg)

Cycling career
- Sport: Cycling
- Current team: Retired
- Discipline: Road
- Role: Rider
- Rider type: Sprinter

Professional teams
- 2007: Marco Polo Cycling-Donckers Koffie
- 2008: Successfulliving.com-Parkpre
- 2009–2016: OUCH–Maxxis

Bradley White (born January 15, 1982, in Troy, Ohio) is an American former cyclist. He owns Velo City Cycles, a bike shop.

== Major results ==
2007
6th Prologue Tour of Hainan
2009
1st Stage 7 Tour of the Gila
Most Courageous Rider Stage 3 Tour of California
2011
Most Aggressive Rider Stage 1 USA Pro Cycling Challenge
2014
1st Stage 5 Tour de Langkawi
2015
19th Team Time Trial UCI Road World Championships
