= Team Illuminate (men's team) =

American cycling team

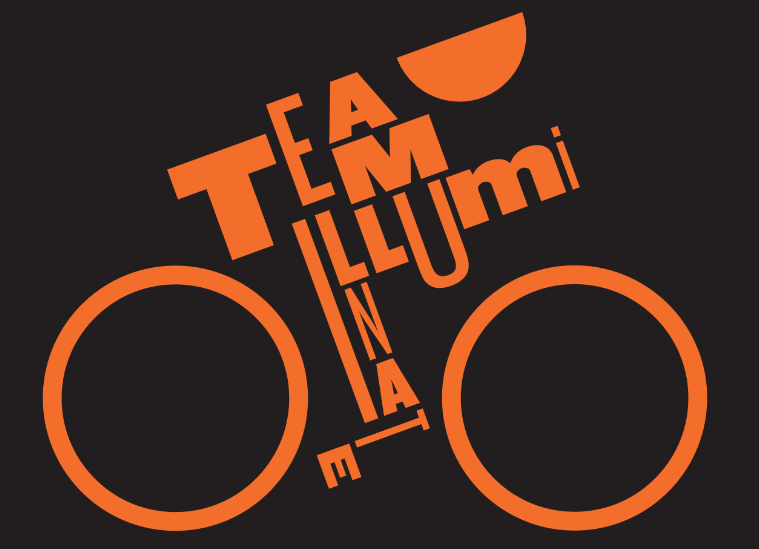

Team information
- UCI code: ILU
- Registered: United States
- Founded: 2014
- Discipline: Road
- Status: UCI Continental
- Website: Team home page

Key personnel
- General manager: Chris Johnson

Team name history
- 2014 2015 2016–: Airgas Cycling; Airgas-Safeway Cycling Team; Team Illuminate

Team Illuminate is an American UCI Continental cycling team established in 2014.

== Team history ==
Team Illuminate grew out of the 2015 Airgas–Safeway team that included 2013 Vuelta a España winner Chris Horner. The team launched the 2016 season with success at the 2.1 rated Tour of Taiwan. Later in the season the team became the first US team to compete in Iran, where US rider Connor McCutcheon captured a stage win and wore the yellow jersey in the 2.1 rated Tour of Iran.

In December 2016, the organisation announced that it was adding a UCI Women's Team for the 2017 season.

== Team roster ==
As of February 19, 2022.

Rider	Date of birth
Cullen Easter (USA)	October 28, 1987 (age 38)
Griffin Easter (USA)	November 6, 1991 (age 34)
Rob Evans (USA)	March 11, 1978 (age 48)
Travis Furman (USA)	March 19, 1989 (age 37)
John Keller (USA)	August 28, 1997 (age 29)

Rider	Date of birth
Aria Kiani (USA)	April 12, 1992 (age 34)
Cameron Piper (USA)	October 16, 1991 (age 34)
Johnatan Fernando Sarmiento (COL)	December 4, 1992 (age 33)
Sebastian Schaub (GER)	March 13, 1997 (age 29)
Rodolfo Andrés Torres (COL)	March 21, 1987 (age 39)

== Major wins ==
2016
Stage 1 Tour of Iran, Connor McCutcheon

2017
Stages 1 & 4 Tour de Taiwan, Edwin Avila
Stage 1 Sibiu Cycling Tour, Edwin Avila
Stage 4 Tour d'Azerbaïdjan, Edwin Avila
Stage 6 Vuelta a Colombia, Griffin Easter
Stage 2 Tour of Rwanda, Simon Pellaud

2018
Points classification Tour of Thailand, Martin Laas

Stages 4, 5 & 6, Martin Laas

Stage 8 Tour of Japan, Martin Laas
Stage 1 Baltic Chain Tour, Martin Laas
Stage 9 Tour of Hainan, Simon Pellaud

2019
Stage 6 The Princess Maha Chakri Sirindhorn's Cup, Martin Laas
Overall Tour of Taiyuan, Cameron Piper

Points classification, Martin Laas
Stage 1, Cameron Piper
Stage 2, 3, 5 & 6, Martin Laas

Stages 2, 4 & 5 Tour de Korea, Martin Laas

== National champions ==
2016
Australian U23 Time Trial, Callum Scotson
Colombian Road Race, Edwin Avila

2019
Colombian Track (Scratch race), Félix Alejandro Barón Castillo
