= Edward Díaz =

Colombian cyclist

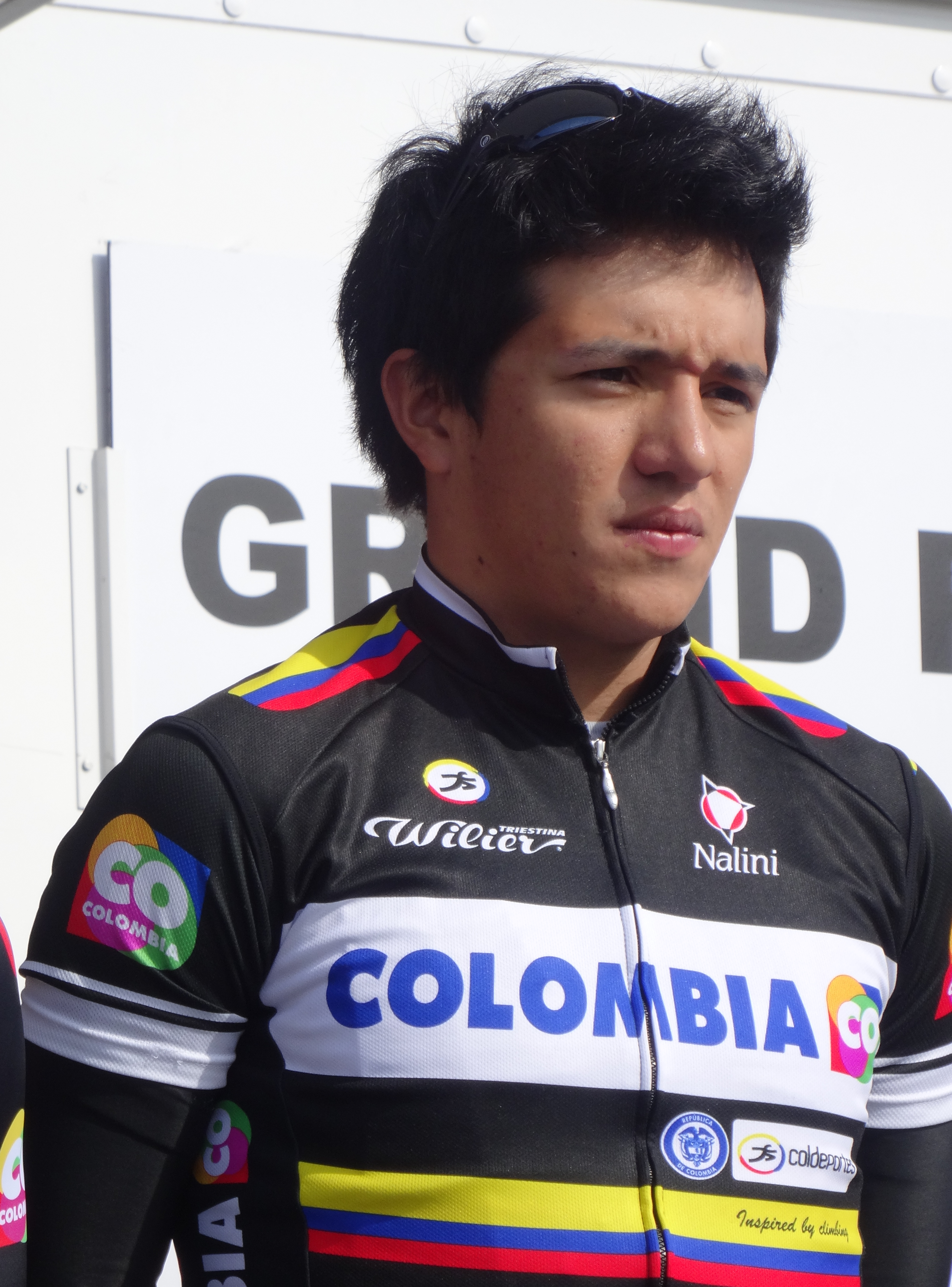
- Díaz in 2014

Personal information
- Full name: Edward Fabián Díaz Cárdenas
- Born: 19 August 1994 (age 32) Nobsa, Colombia
- Height: 1.73 m (5 ft 8 in)
- Weight: 68 kg (150 lb; 10.7 st)

Cycling career
- Sport: Cycling
- Current team: Suspended
- Discipline: Road
- Role: Rider
- Rider type: All-rounder

Amateur team
- 2013: Lotería de Boyacá

Professional teams
- 2014–2015: Colombia
- 2016: GW–Shimano
- 2017: EPM

Edward Fabián Díaz Cárdenas (born 19 August 1994) is a Colombian professional racing cyclist, who is currently suspended from the sport after testing positive for continuous erythropoietin receptor activator (CERA) at the 2017 Vuelta a Colombia.
