= Dúber Quintero =

Colombian cyclist

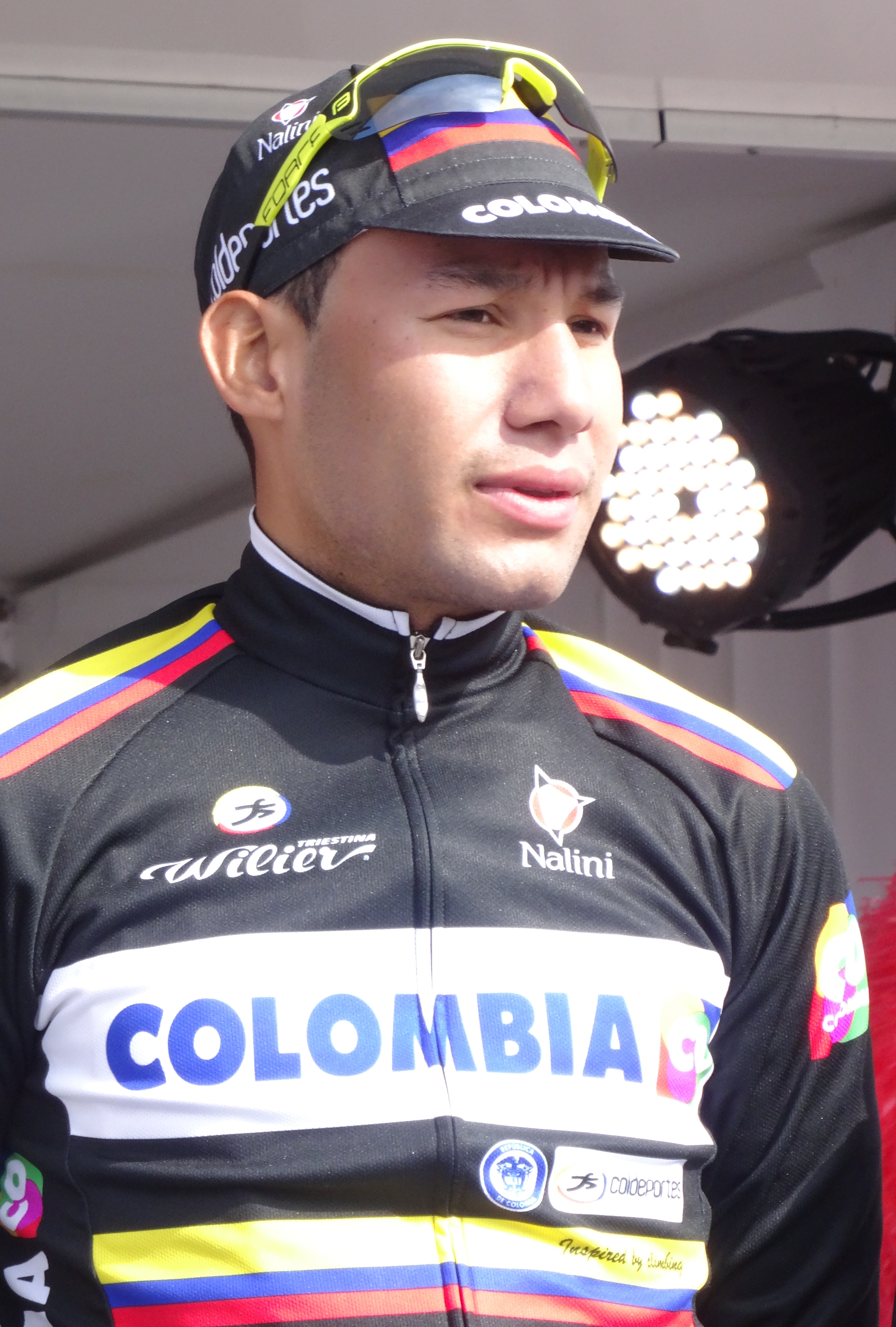

Personal information
- Full name: Dúber Armando Quintero Artunduaga
- Born: August 23, 1990 (age 36) Gigante, Huila, Colombia
- Height: 1.75 m (5 ft 9 in)

Cycling career
- Sport: Cycling
- Discipline: Road
- Role: Rider

Amateur teams
- 2011–2012: Delio Gallina S. Inox Tonoli
- 2012: Colombia–Coldeportes (stagiaire)
- 2015: PR–Pijaos
- 2017: Sundark Arawak Eca

Professional team
- 2013–2014: Colombia

Dúber Armando Quintero Artunduaga (born 23 August 1990 in Gigante, Huila) is a Colombian cyclist, who competed professionally for UCI Professional Continental team Colombia from 2013 to 2014.

== Major results ==
2007
1st Road race, National Junior Road Championships
2012
1st Coppa Festa in Fiera San Salvatore
1st Targa Crocifisso
2014
1st Stage 1 Tour de Langkawi
