= Gigante, Huila =

Coordinates: 2.38667°N 75.5461°W

- Municipality and town
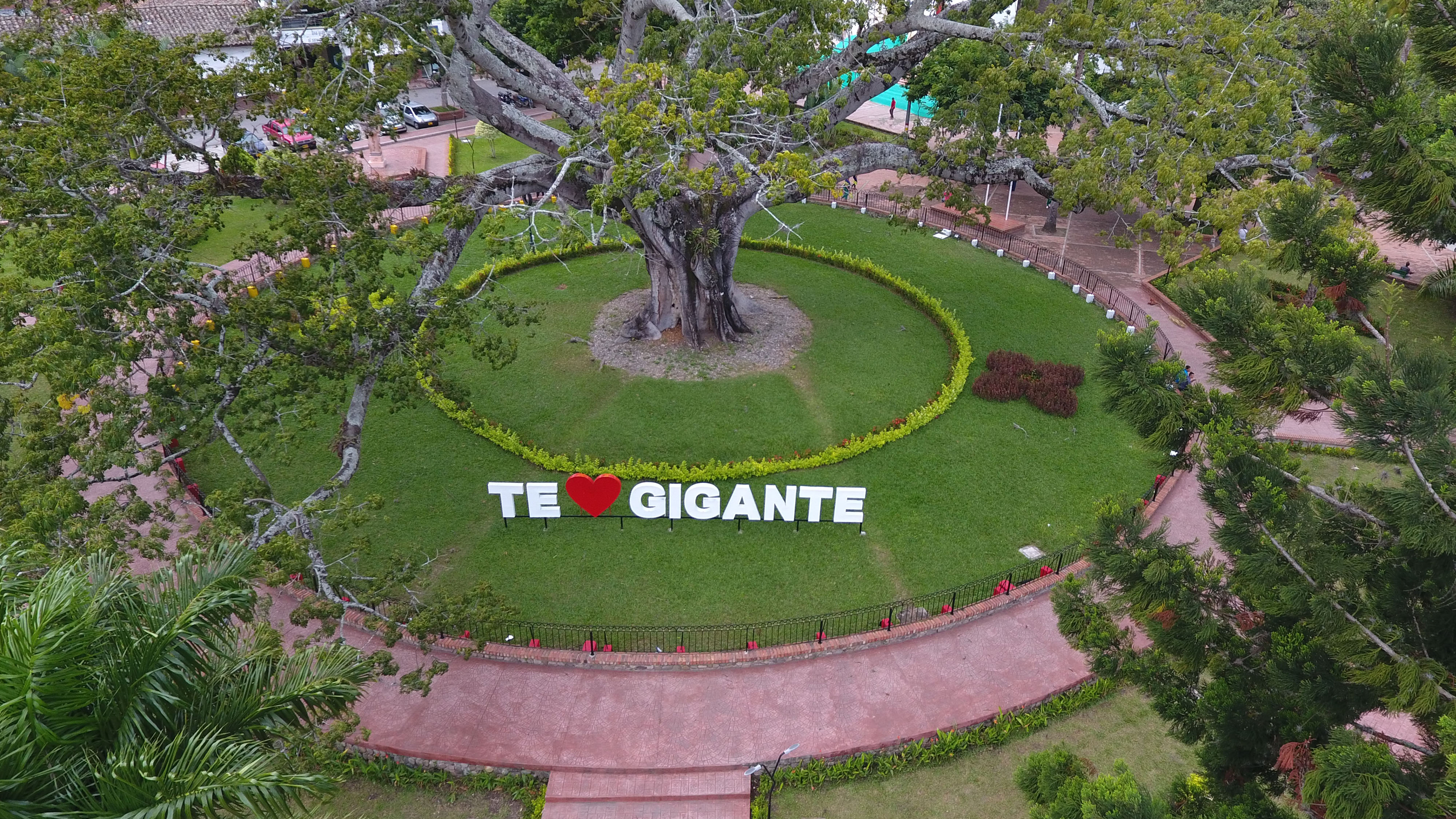
- Main square

- Flag

- Location of the municipality and town of Gigante, Huila in the Huila Department of Colombia.
- Country: Colombia
- Department: Huila Department

Population (2020 est.)
  - Total: 36,055
- Time zone: UTC-5 (Colombia Standard Time)

Gigante (Spanish pronunciation: [xiˈɣante]) is a town and municipality in the Huila Department, Colombia.

== Climate ==
Climate data for Gigante (Jorge Villamil), elevation 1,500 m (4,900 ft), (1981–2010)
Month	Jan	Feb	Mar	Apr	May	Jun	Jul	Aug	Sep	Oct	Nov	Dec	Year
Mean daily maximum °C (°F)	24.8 (76.6)	25.0 (77.0)	24.8 (76.6)	24.8 (76.6)	24.8 (76.6)	24.2 (75.6)	23.8 (74.8)	24.7 (76.5)	25.5 (77.9)	24.8 (76.6)	24.4 (75.9)	24.7 (76.5)	24.7 (76.5)
Daily mean °C (°F)	20.1 (68.2)	20.3 (68.5)	20.2 (68.4)	20.2 (68.4)	20.1 (68.2)	19.6 (67.3)	19.1 (66.4)	19.6 (67.3)	20.1 (68.2)	19.9 (67.8)	19.9 (67.8)	20.0 (68.0)	19.9 (67.8)
Mean daily minimum °C (°F)	16.2 (61.2)	16.5 (61.7)	16.6 (61.9)	16.7 (62.1)	16.5 (61.7)	15.9 (60.6)	15.4 (59.7)	15.6 (60.1)	15.9 (60.6)	16.1 (61.0)	16.4 (61.5)	16.2 (61.2)	16.2 (61.2)
Average precipitation mm (inches)	83.7 (3.30)	98.2 (3.87)	131.9 (5.19)	138.9 (5.47)	140.6 (5.54)	108.9 (4.29)	84.2 (3.31)	65.1 (2.56)	72.0 (2.83)	153.2 (6.03)	120.6 (4.75)	89.3 (3.52)	1,286.8 (50.66)
Average relative humidity (%)	78	77	78	79	79	77	76	73	72	78	80	79	77
Mean monthly sunshine hours	111.6	81.9	86.8	84.0	93.0	87.0	89.9	102.3	99.0	89.9	93.0	111.6	1,130
Mean daily sunshine hours	3.6	2.9	2.8	2.8	3.0	2.9	2.9	3.3	3.3	2.9	3.1	3.6	3.1
Source: Instituto de Hidrologia Meteorologia y Estudios Ambientales
