= Luis Largo =

Colombian cyclist

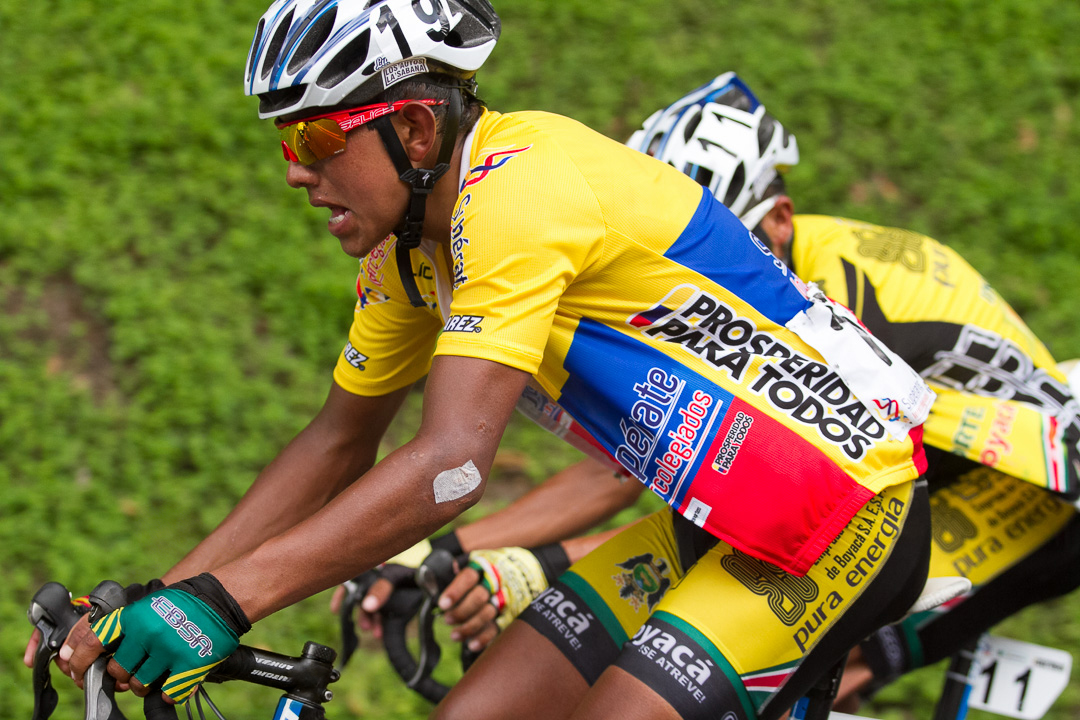

Personal information
- Full name: Luis Alberto Quintero Largo
- Born: April 14, 1990 (age 36) Chíquiza, Colombia

Cycling career
- Sport: Cycling
- Discipline: Road
- Role: Rider

Amateur teams
- 2013: EBSA–Indeportes Boyacá
- 2016: Orven NL
- 2017: Ropa Deportiva H&F
- 2017: Sogamoso Ciudad Influyente–IRDS

Professional team
- 2014: Colombia

Luis Alberto Quintero Largo (born April 14, 1990, in Chíquiza) is a Colombian cyclist.

== Doping ban ==
Largo tested positive for 19-norandrosterone and noretiocholanolone in an out-of-competition control 22 January 2014 and was subsequently handed a two-year ban from sport. He had just arrived in Europe to ride as a neo-pro for pro continental team Colombia at the time of the test, and he lost his contract with the team because of the anti-doping rule violation.

== Major results ==
2010
1st Stage 1 Vuelta a Colombia Under-23 (TTT)
2012
3rd Overall Vuelta a Boyacá
2013
1st Overall Vuelta a Cundinamarca

1st Stage 1
