= Jonathan Paredes (cyclist) =

Colombian cyclist (1989–2025)

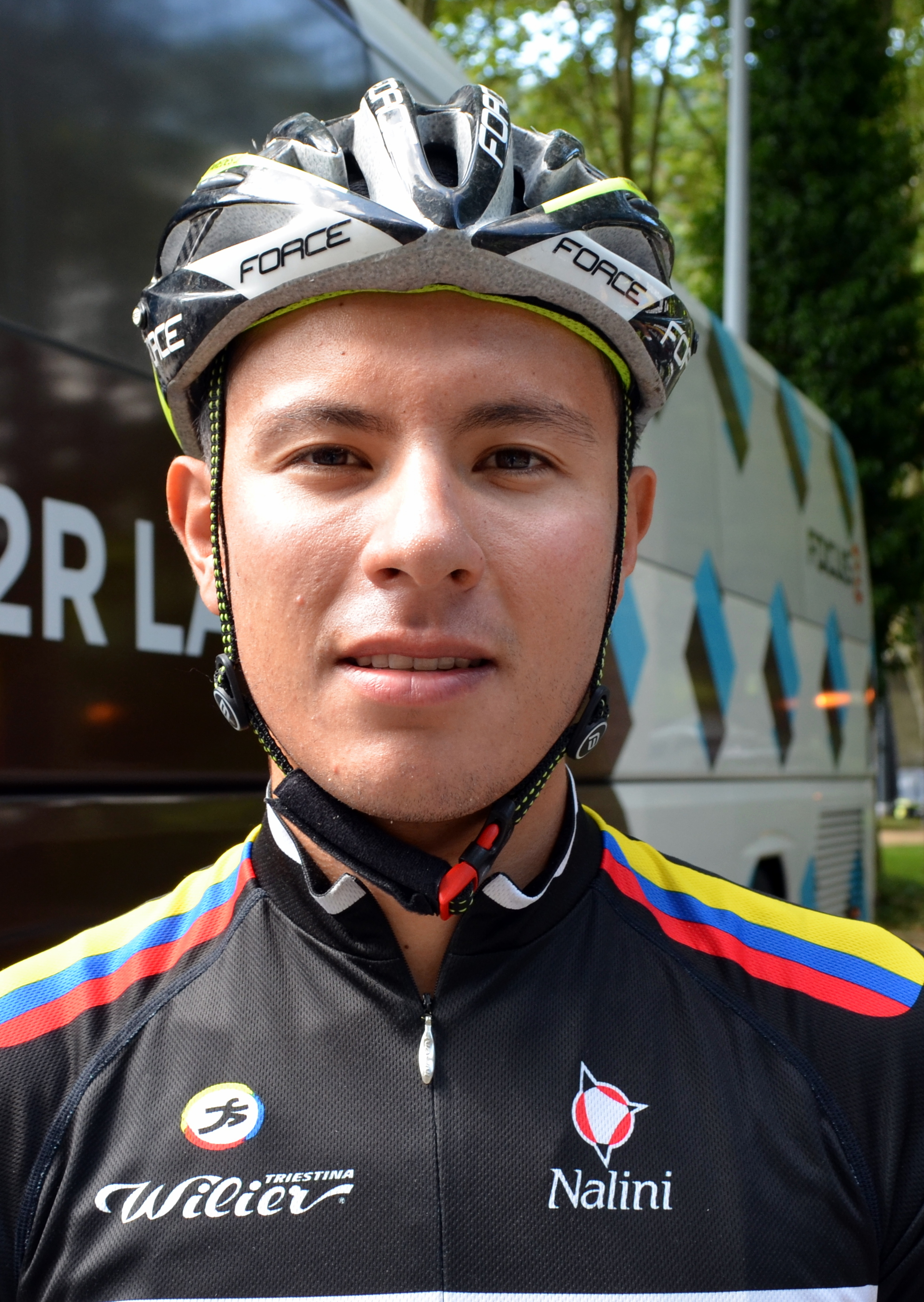
- Paredes in 2014

Personal information
- Full name: Jonathan Felipe Paredes Hernández
- Born: 4 April 1989 Duitama, Colombia
- Died: 19 May 2025 (aged 36) between Tunja and Duitama, Boyacá, Colombia
- Height: 1.75 m (5 ft 9 in)
- Weight: 63 kg (139 lb; 9.9 st)

Cycling career
- Sport: Cycling
- Discipline: Road
- Role: Rider
- Rider type: All-rounder

Amateur teams
- 2010: Lotería de Boyacá
- 2011: Empresa de Energía de Boyacá
- 2012: Boyacá Orgullo de América
- 2013: Supergiros–Blanco del Valle–Redetrans
- 2016–2017: EBSA–Indeportes Boyacá

Professional team
- 2014–2015: Colombia
Medal record
Men's road bicycle racing
Representing Colombia
Pan American Championships
Gold medal – first place	2013 Zacatecas	Road race

Jonathan Felipe Paredes Hernández (4 April 1989 – 19 May 2025) was a Colombian professional racing cyclist. Paredes was suspended from the sport after testing positive for continuous erythropoietin receptor activator (CERA) at the 2017 Vuelta a Colombia.

Paredes was killed in a traffic accident involving a truck while out cycling with two friends, between Tunja and Duitama in the Boyacá Department, on 19 May 2025. He was 36.
