= Darwin Pantoja =

Colombian cyclist

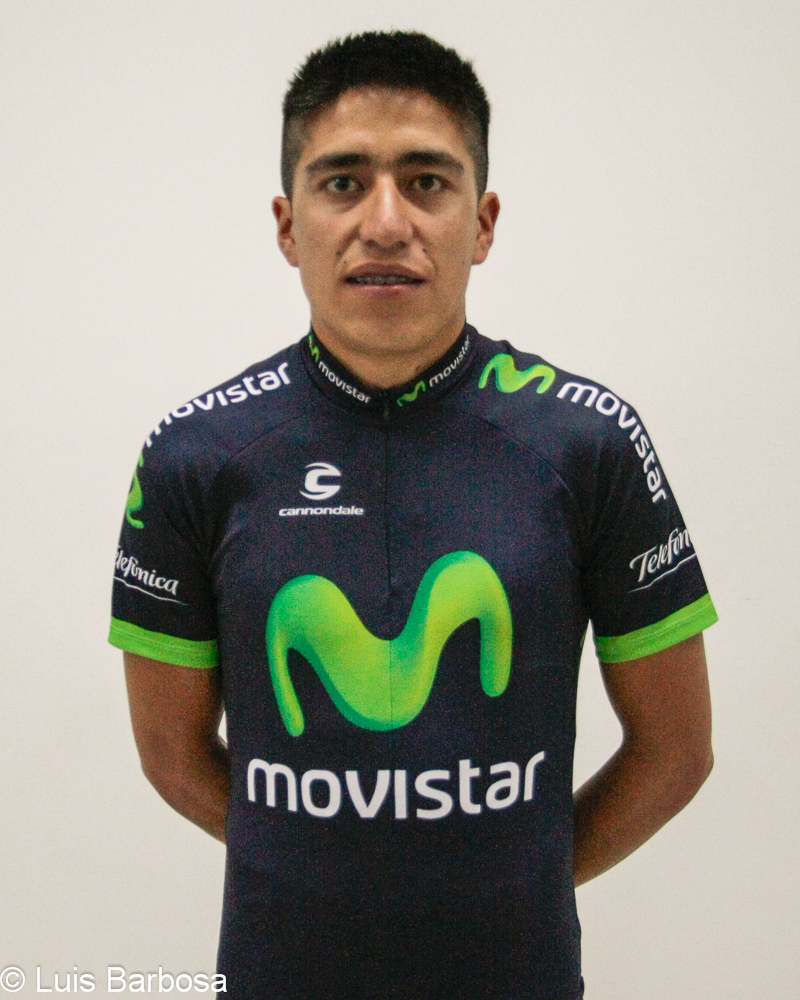
- Pantoja in 2013

Personal information
- Full name: Darwin Ferney Pantoja Tovar
- Born: 25 September 1990 (age 36) Túquerres, Colombia

Cycling career
- Sport: Cycling
- Current team: Retired
- Discipline: Road
- Role: Rider
- Rider type: Climber

Amateur team
- 2013: Movistar Team América

Professional teams
- 2009: Colombia es Pasión–Coldeportes
- 2011–2012: Gobernación de Antioquia–Indeportes Antioquia
- 2014–2015: Colombia

Darwin Ferney Pantoja Tovar (born 25 September 1990) is a Colombian former professional racing cyclist.

== Major results ==
2010
6th Overall Vuelta al Ecuador
2013
1st Stage 2 Vuelta al Ecuador
