= Jarlinson Pantano =

Colombian cyclist (born 1988)

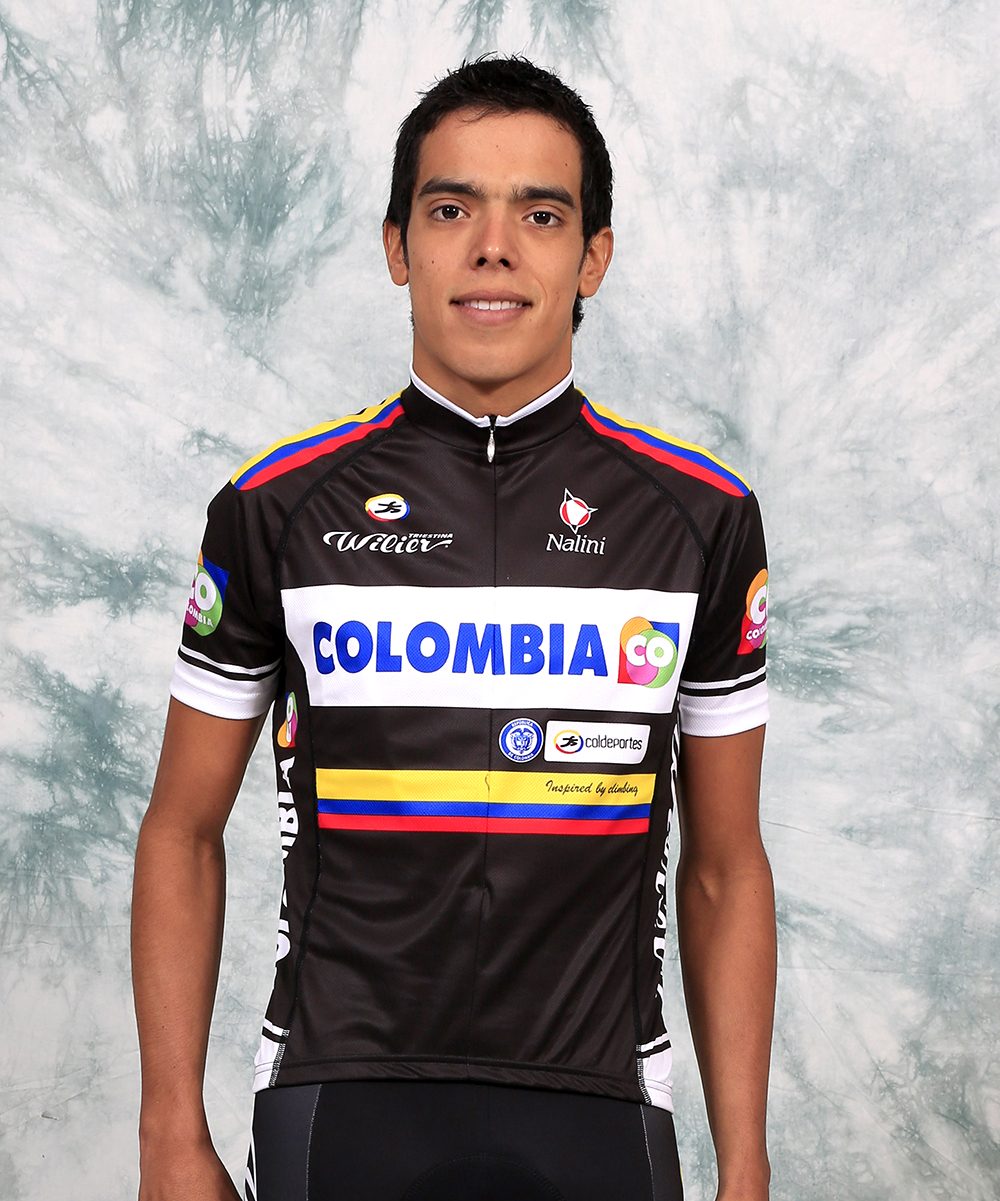
- Pantano in 2013

Personal information
- Full name: Jarlinson Pantano Gómez
- Born: 19 November 1988 (age 37) Cali, Colombia
- Height: 1.73 m (5 ft 8 in)
- Weight: 60 kg (132 lb)

Cycling career
- Sport: Cycling
- Current team: Nu Colombia
- Discipline: Road
- Role: Rider
- Rider type: Climber

Amateur teams
- 2011: Colombia es Pasión–Café de Colombia
- 2023–: EPM–Scott

Professional teams
- 2012–2014: Colombia–Coldeportes
- 2015–2016: IAM Cycling
- 2017–2019: Trek–Segafredo

Major wins
- Grand Tours Tour de France 1 individual stage (2016) One-day races and Classics National Time Trial Championships (2017)

Jarlinson Pantano Gómez (born 19 November 1988) is a Colombian racing cyclist, Pantano previously rode professionally between 2012 and 2019 for the Colombia, IAM Cycling and Trek–Segafredo teams, before he was suspended for four years after a positive drugs test for erythropoietin (EPO).

== Career ==
He competed in the 2014 Giro d'Italia. In December 2014 he was announced as part of the squad for the IAM Cycling team for 2015. He raced in the 2015 Tour de France, finishing in 19th place. Pantano was the winner of the fifteenth stage of the 2016 Tour de France, on a mountain stage across the Grand Colombier, from Bourg-en-Bresse to Culoz.

In July 2016 he replaced Nairo Quintana for selection in the individual road race at the Rio de Janeiro Olympics.

In 2016, he signed a two-year contract with Trek–Segafredo for the 2017 and 2018 seasons. Pantano agreed a two-year extension of his contract in 2018, through 2020.

== Adverse analytical finding and doping ban ==
In April 2019, Trek–Segafredo announced that Pantano had been 'immediately suspended' from the team after being notified that he had returned an adverse analytical finding (AAF) for erythropoietin (EPO) in a doping test carried out on 26 February. As a result of the AAF, he was provisionally suspended from the sport by the UCI, the sport's international governing body. In June 2019, he announced his retirement from professional racing.

In May 2020, a UCI tribunal banned Pantano for four years, backdated to his initial provisional suspension, meaning he was unable to compete until April 2023. Upon the completion of his ban, Pantano returned to the peloton – at amateur level – with Colombian team EPM–Scott.

== Major results ==
2008
2nd Overall Grand Prix Guillaume Tell
5th Overall Ronde de l'Isard
7th Overall Tour de l'Avenir
2009
1st Stage 5 Coupe des nations Ville Saguenay
8th Overall Cinturón a Mallorca
2010
3rd Overall Tour de l'Avenir
4th Overall Cinturón a Mallorca
2011
1st Stage 7 Vuelta a Colombia
2014
1st Mountains classification, Tour Méditerranéen
7th Gran Premio di Lugano
7th Roma Maxima
9th Overall Settimana Internazionale di Coppi e Bartali
2015
9th Overall Tour Down Under
2016
Tour de France

1st Stage 15
Combativity award Stages 17 & 20

4th Overall Tour de Suisse

1st Stage 9

5th Gran Premio di Lugano
8th Overall Volta ao Algarve
2017
National Road Championships

1st Time trial
2nd Road race

10th Overall Tour of Turkey
2018
1st Stage 5 Volta a Catalunya

=== Grand Tour general classification results timeline ===
Grand Tour	2013	2014	2015	2016	2017	2018
Giro d'Italia	46	32	—	—	—	54
Tour de France	—	—	19	19	46	—
Vuelta a España	—	—	—	—	33	—

Legend
—	Did not compete
DNF	Did not finish
