= Rodolfo Torres (cyclist) =

Colombian cyclist

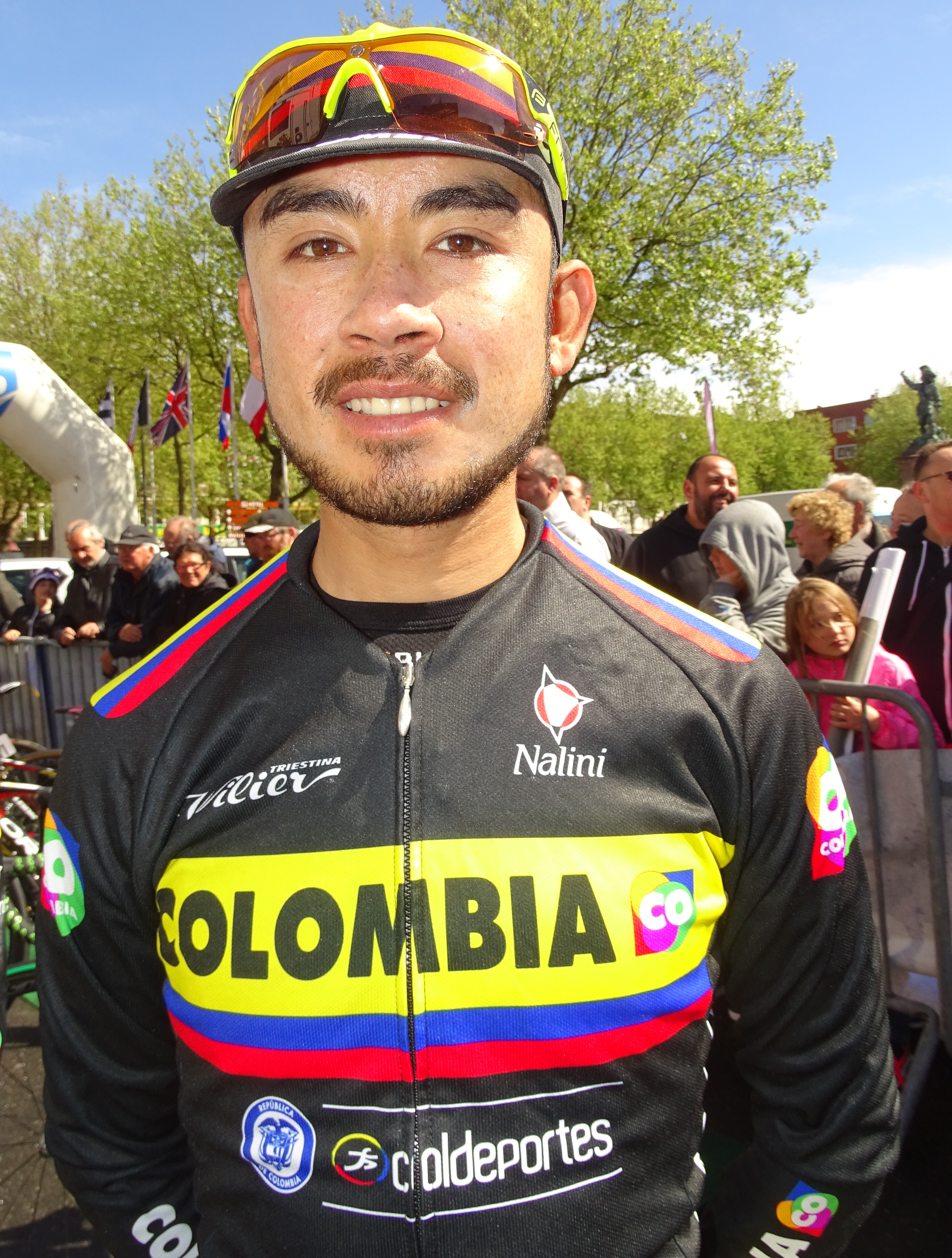
- Torres in 2015

Personal information
- Full name: Rodolfo Andrés Torres Agudelo
- Born: 21 March 1987 (age 39) Busbanzá, Colombia
- Height: 1.69 m (5 ft 7 in)
- Weight: 58 kg (128 lb; 9.1 st)

Cycling career
- Sport: Cycling
- Current team: Boyacá Construcciones Zea el Faro
- Discipline: Road
- Role: Rider
- Rider type: Climber

Amateur teams
- 2010–2011: Boyacá Orgullo de América
- 2012: GW–Shimano
- 2013: Formesán–Bogotá Humana
- 2021–: Boyacá Construcciones Zea el Faro

Professional teams
- 2007: Boyacá es para Vivirla
- 2014–2015: Colombia
- 2016–2018: Androni Giocattoli–Sidermec
- 2019–2020: Team Illuminate

Rodolfo Andrés Torres Agudelo (born 21 March 1987 in Busbanzá) is a Colombian former racing cyclist and politician, who most recently rode for the Team Illuminate and for the Colombian amateur team Boyacá Construcciones Zea el Faro. He competed in the 2014 Giro d'Italia and 2015 Vuelta a España. As of 2026, he serves as the mayor of the municipality of Busbanzá.

== Major results ==
2010
Vuelta Mexico Telmex

1st Mountains classification
1st Stage 7 (ITT)

2011
6th Overall Vuelta Ciclista a Costa Rica
8th Overall Vuelta del Uruguay
2015
1st Mountains classification Giro del Trentino
2nd Overall Tour de San Luis

1st Mountains classification

7th Overall Vuelta a Asturias

1st Mountains classification

7th Overall Vuelta a Burgos
8th Overall Tour de Langkawi
8th Overall Vuelta a Castilla y León
Combativity award Stage 16 Vuelta a España
2016
2nd Overall Tour of Bihor
5th Overall Tour du Limousin
6th Overall Tour de San Luis
6th Giro dell'Emilia
8th Milano–Torino
10th Overall Settimana Internazionale di Coppi e Bartali
2017
1st Overall Tour of Bihor

1st Stage 2a

3rd Overall Vuelta a San Juan
5th Overall Settimana Internazionale di Coppi e Bartali
5th Giro dell'Appennino
10th Overall Tour of the Alps
10th Overall Vuelta a Castilla y León
2018
3rd Overall Vuelta a San Juan
2019
9th Overall Tour of Taiyuan
10th Overall Tour of Romania

=== Grand Tour general classification results timeline ===
Grand Tour	2014	2015	2016	2017	2018
Giro d'Italia	81	—	—	—	59
Tour de France	—	—	—	—	—
Vuelta a España	—	32	—	—	—
