= Miguel Ángel Rubiano =

Colombian cyclist (born 1984)

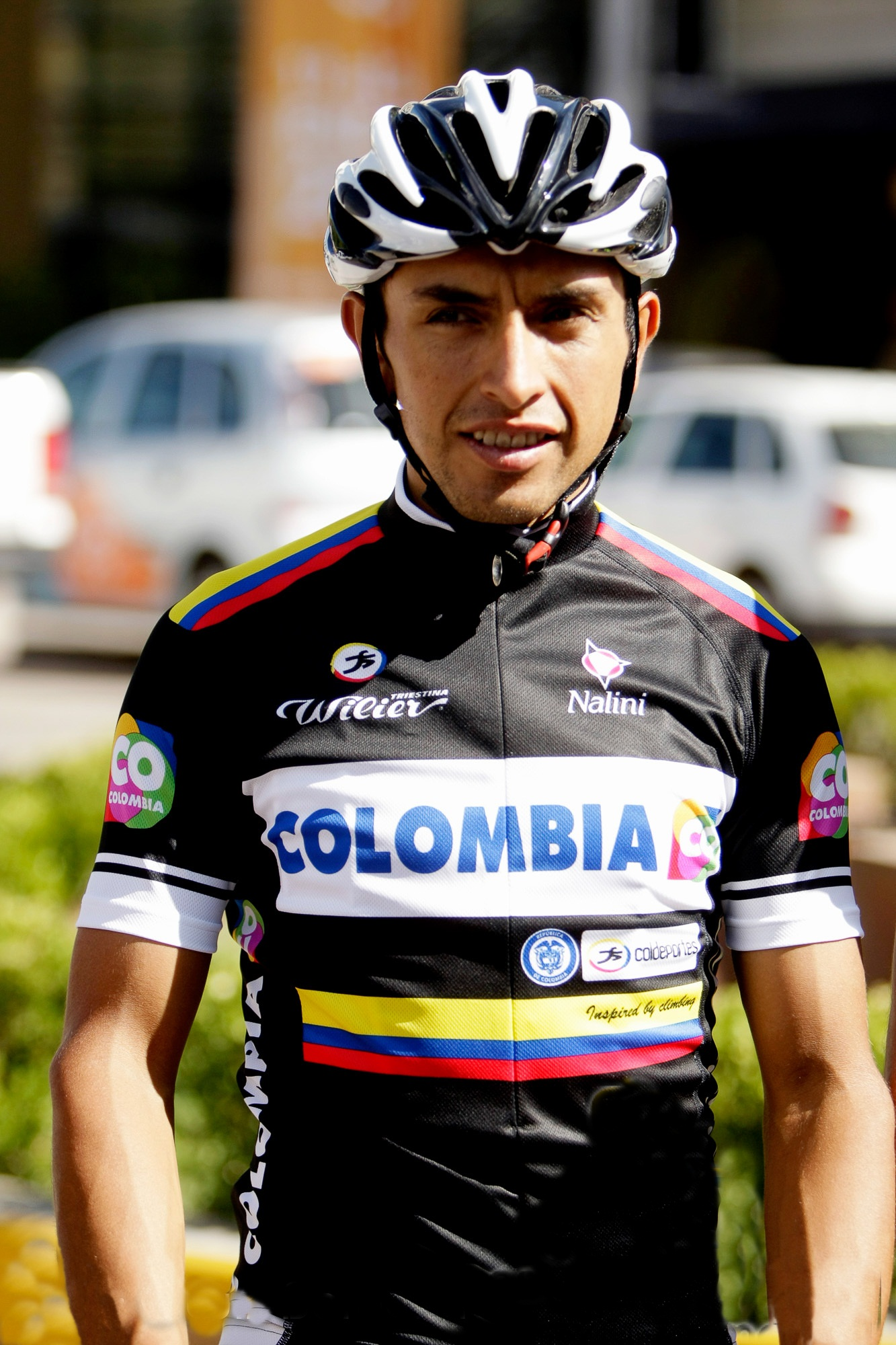
- Rubiano at the 2014 Tour de San Luis.

Personal information
- Full name: Miguel Ángel Rubiano Chávez
- Born: 3 October 1984 (age 42) Bogotá, Colombia
- Height: 1.70 m (5 ft 7 in)
- Weight: 58 kg (128 lb; 9.1 st)

Cycling career
- Sport: Cycling
- Current team: Team Petrolike
- Discipline: Road
- Role: Rider
- Rider type: Climbing specialist

Amateur teams
- 2016: Coldeportes–Claro
- 2021: Colombia Tierra de Atletas–GW Bicicletas
- 2022: Herrera Sport Ropa Deportiva
- 2022–: Team Petrolike

Professional teams
- 2006: Ceramica Panaria–Navigare
- 2008–2009: Centri della Calzatura–Partizan
- 2010: Meridiana–Kamen
- 2011: D'Angelo & Antenucci–Nippo
- 2012–2013: Androni Giocattoli–Venezuela
- 2014–2015: Colombia
- 2016: China Continental Team of Gansu Bank
- 2017–2019: Coldeportes–Zenú
- 2020: Colombia Tierra de Atletas–GW Bicicletas

Major wins
- Grand Tours Giro d'Italia 1 individual stage (2012) Single-day races and Classics National Road Race Championships (2014)

Miguel Ángel Rubiano Chávez (born 3 October 1984) is a Colombian road bicycle racer, who currently rides for Mexican amateur team Petrolike. Rubiano has also competed for the Ceramica Panaria–Navigare, Centri della Calzatura–Partizan, Meridiana–Kamen, D'Angelo & Antenucci–Nippo, Androni Giocattoli–Venezuela, Colombia, China Continental Team of Gansu Bank, Coldeportes–Zenú and Colombia Tierra de Atletas–GW Bicicletas squads. During his career, he has competed in five Grand Tours, including four editions of the Giro d'Italia and the 2015 Vuelta a España.

The first win of his career on a Grand Tour came in 2012, on stage 6 of the Giro d'Italia, where he dropped his breakaway companions with 45 kilometers to go and soloed his way to victory with one minute and ten seconds advantage over his nearest competitor.

== Major results ==
2005
4th Trofeo Internazionale Bastianelli
2006
1st Mountains classification, Regio-Tour
6th GP Industria & Artigianato di Larciano
10th Giro dell'Appennino
2007
8th Giro di Toscana
8th Tre Valli Varesine
2008
4th Giro dell'Appennino
5th Overall Okolo Slovenska

1st Stage 1

5th Overall Doble Sucre Potosí GP Cemento Fancesa

1st Stage 4

6th Overall Istrian Spring Trophy
7th Gran Premio Industria e Commercio Artigianato Carnaghese
9th Overall Settimana Ciclistica Lombarda
10th Giro del Medio Brenta
2009
3rd Trofeo Melinda
4th Giro della Provincia di Reggio Calabria
4th Coppa Sabatini
5th Gran Premio Industria e Commercio Artigianato Carnaghese
5th Coppa Ugo Agostoni
6th Giro di Toscana
6th Giro del Veneto
8th Giro della Romagna
10th Giro dell'Appennino
2010
2nd GP Industria & Artigianato di Larciano
2nd Trofeo Matteotti
4th Coppa Ugo Agostoni
9th Overall Troféu Joaquim Agostinho
10th GP Kranj
2011
1st Overall Tour de Hokkaido

1st Stage 4 (ITT)

2nd Overall Tour de Kumano
2nd Trofeo Melinda
3rd Giro di Toscana
3rd Trofeo Matteotti
4th Gran Premio Bruno Beghelli
5th Overall Tour de San Luis

1st Stage 6

6th Giro della Romagna
8th Overall Okolo Slovenska

1st Stage 3

8th Gran Premio Nobili Rubinetterie – Coppa Papà Carlo
8th Coppa Ugo Agostoni
9th Gran Premio Città di Camaiore
9th Tre Valli Varesine
9th Gran Premio Industria e Commercio Artigianato Carnaghese
10th Memorial Marco Pantani
2012
1st Mountains classification Tour de San Luis
1st Mountains classification Settimana Internazionale di Coppi e Bartali
Giro d'Italia

1st Stage 6
Held after Stages 6–11

2nd Trofeo Laigueglia
2nd Coppa Sabatini
3rd Prueba Villafranca de Ordizia
5th Gran Premio di Lugano
6th Trofeo Matteotti
8th Gran Premio Industria e Commercio di Prato
8th Gran Premio Bruno Beghelli
9th Gran Premio Città di Camaiore
9th Giro dell'Emilia
10th Giro dell'Appennino
10th Memorial Marco Pantani
2013
2nd Gran Premio Industria e Commercio di Prato
3rd Overall Settimana Internazionale di Coppi e Bartali
4th Memorial Marco Pantani
5th Giro di Toscana
6th Gran Premio Città di Camaiore
7th Overall Tour de San Luis
9th Gran Premio della Costa Etruschi
9th Coppa Sabatini
10th Giro dell'Appennino
2014
1st Road race, National Road Championships
3rd Giro dell'Appennino
9th Coppa Ugo Agostoni
10th Overall Vuelta a Colombia
2015
6th Overall Route du Sud
9th Memorial Marco Pantani
10th Overall Tour de Luxembourg
Combativity award Stage 6 Vuelta a España
2016
1st Stage 1 Tour of Qinghai Lake
2017
6th Overall Vuelta a Colombia

=== Grand Tour general classification results timeline ===
Grand Tour	2006	2007	2008	2009	2010	2011	2012	2013	2014	2015
Giro d'Italia	103	—	—	—	—	—	62	45	101	—
Tour de France	Did not contest during his career									
Vuelta a España	—	—	—	—	—	—	—	—	—	70

Legend
—	Did not compete
DNF	Did not finish
