= GW–Shimano =

Colombian professional men's cycling team

GW-Shimano
Team information
- Registered: Colombia
- Founded: 2006
- Disbanded: 2019
- Discipline: Road
- Status: Amateur (2006–2015); UCI Continental (2016–2019)

Team name history
- 2006–2019: GW–Shimano

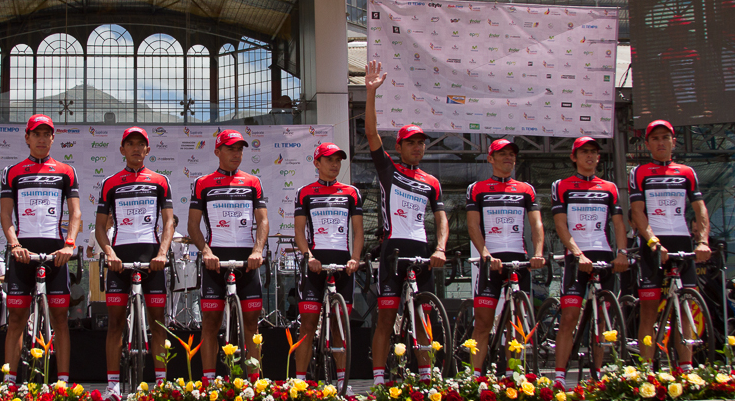
GW-Shimano Team in 2013

GW–Shimano was a professional men's cycling team based in Colombia and founded in 2006, which competes in elite road bicycle racing events under UCI Continental rules.

== Team roster ==
Rider	Date of birth
Wilson Cardona (COL)	25 September 1995 (age 30)
Sergio Andres Martinez (COL)	14 July 1995 (age 31)
Alejandro Osorio (COL)	28 May 1998 (age 28)
Jhonatan Ospina (COL)	18 November 1993 (age 32)
Heiner Parra (COL)	9 October 1991 (age 34)
Walter Pedraza (COL)	27 November 1981 (age 44)

Rider	Date of birth
Carlos Ramírez (COL)	26 October 1994 (age 31)
Juan Pablo Rendón (COL)	17 April 1989 (age 37)
Yeison Sebastian Reyes (COL)	14 February 1997 (age 29)
José Serpa (COL)	17 April 1979 (age 47)
Cristian Talero (COL)	25 March 1990 (age 36)
Christian Leandro Tamayo (COL)	21 March 1991 (age 35)

== Major wins ==
2012
Colombia Road Race Championships, Félix Cardenas
Stage 9 Vuelta Ciclista de Chile, Félix Cardenas
Overall Vuelta a Colombia, Félix Cardenas

Stages 3, 4 & 10, Félix Cardenas

Overall Vuelta a Costa Rica, Óscar Eduardo Sánchez

Stages 5 (ITT) & 7, Óscar Eduardo Sánchez

2016
Stage 8 Vuelta a Colombia, Frank Osorio
Stage 11 Vuelta a Colombia, Alexis Camacho
2017
Stage 6 Vuelta a Costa Rica, Wilson Cardona
2018
Stage 8 Vuelta al Táchira, Cristian Talero
Stage 9 Vuelta al Táchira, José Serpa

== National champions ==
2012
Colombian Road Race Championship, Félix Cardenas
