= Jeffry Romero =

Colombian cyclist

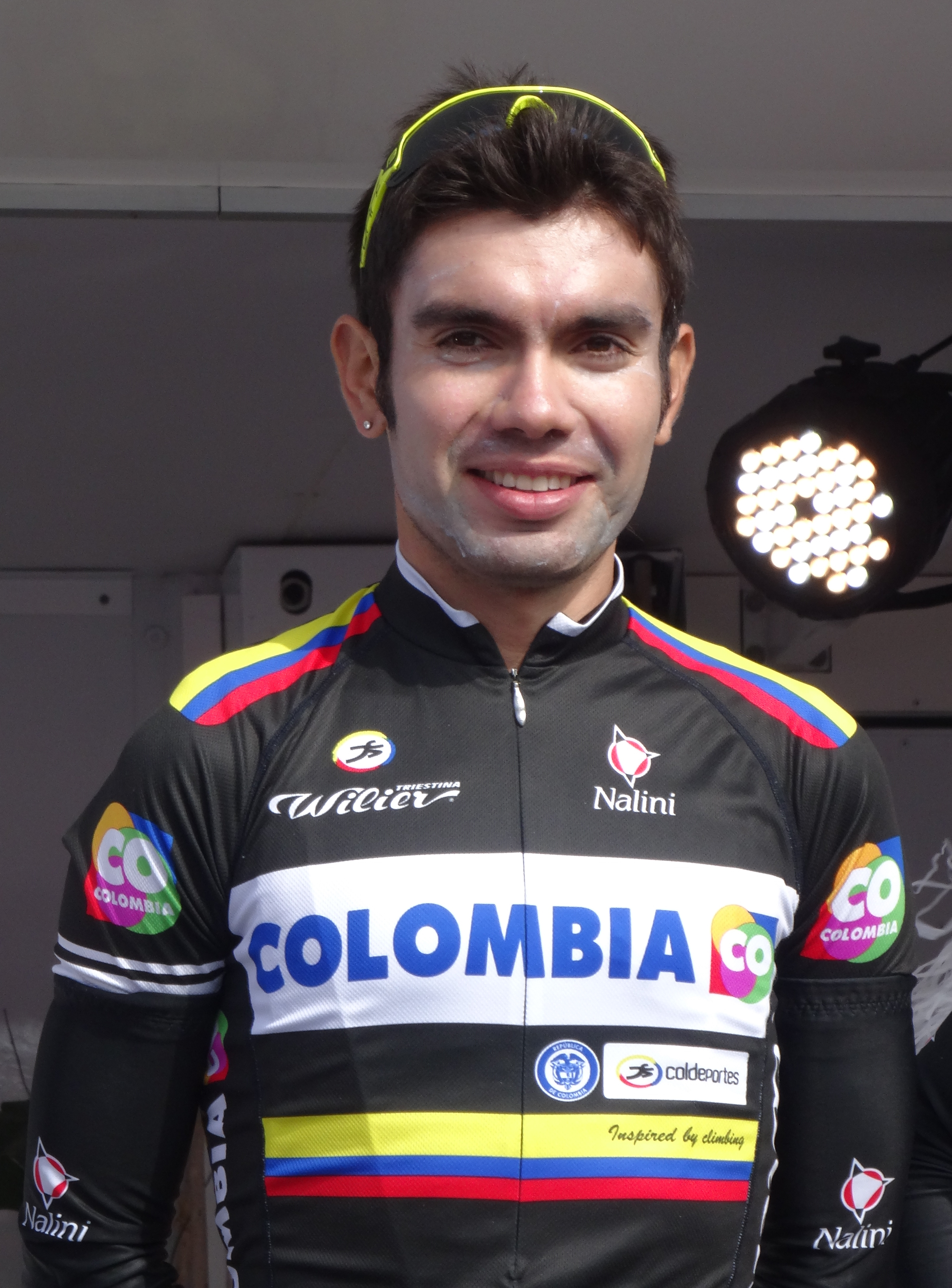
- Romero in 2014

Personal information
- Full name: Jeffry Johan Romero Corredor
- Born: 4 October 1989 (age 37) Yopal, Colombia

Cycling career
- Sport: Cycling
- Current team: Retired
- Discipline: Road
- Role: Rider
- Rider type: Climber

Amateur teams
- 2010–2011: Boyacá Orgullo de América
- 2015: Raza de Campeones Loteria da Boyacá

Professional teams
- 2008: Colombia es Pasión–Coldeportes
- 2009: Boyacá es Para Vivirla
- 2011: SP Tableware
- 2012–2014: Colombia–Coldeportes
- 2016: Boyacá Raza de Campeones

Jeffry Johan Romero Corredor (born 4 October 1989) is a Colombian former racing cyclist, who rode professionally between 2008 and 2016 for the Colombia es Pasión–Coldeportes, Boyacá es Para Vivirla, SP Tableware, Colombia and Boyacá Raza de Campeones teams. He rode in the 2014 Giro d'Italia with the Colombia team.

== Major results ==
2007
8th Road race, UCI Juniors World Championships
2008
1st Stage 5 Vuelta a Guatemala
2012
5th Prueba Villafranca de Ordizia
10th Gran Premio Nobili Rubinetterie
2014
1st Stage 2 Vuelta a Colombia
2015
3rd Road race, National Road Championships
