= Colombia (cycling team) =

Colombian cycling team

Team information
- UCI code: COL
- Registered: Adro, Italy
- Founded: 2012
- Disbanded: 2015
- Discipline: Road
- Status: UCI Professional Continental
- Bicycles: Wilier
- Website: Team home page

Key personnel
- General manager: Claudio Corti
- Team managers: Valerio Tebaldi; Oscar Pelliccioli; Oliverio Rincon Quintana; Marco Corti

Team name history
- 2012 2013–2015: Colombia–Coldeportes; Colombia
Colombia jersey
Jersey

Colombia (UCI team code: COL) was a Colombian UCI Professional Continental cycling team based in Adro (Italy) that participated in UCI Continental Circuits and UCI World Tour races.

== History ==
In January 2012, it was announced that the team had received invites to the Italian classic races Tirreno–Adriatico, Milan–San Remo and Giro di Lombardia. They were invited to ride the 2013 Giro d'Italia. The team was also invited to the 2014 Giro d'Italia, where during the tenth stage of the race, members of the team wore a white cockade, in memory of the people who died in the Fundación bus fire in Colombia. In 2015 they were invited to the Vuelta a España for the first time. At 30 August it became clear that Cano, Qunitero and Ávila who all cycle for Team Colombia, was picked out for Colombia National Team at the 2015 UCI Road World Championships in Richmond, Virginia.

In October 2015, the team announced they would be disbanding and not returning for the 2016 season, citing shortfalls in sponsorship from the Colombian Sports Ministry.

== Team roster ==
As of 31 January 2015.

Rider	Date of birth
Edwin Ávila (COL)	21 December 1989 (aged 26)
Alex Cano (COL)	13 March 1983 (aged 32)
Camilo Castiblanco (COL)	24 November 1988 (aged 27)
Edward Díaz (COL)	19 August 1994 (aged 21)
Fabio Duarte (COL)	11 June 1986 (aged 29)
Leonardo Duque (COL)	10 April 1980 (aged 35)
Daniel Martínez (COL)	25 April 1996 (aged 19)
Juan Sebastián Molano (COL)	11 April 1994 (aged 21)
Darwin Pantoja (COL)	25 September 1990 (aged 25)

Rider	Date of birth
Jonathan Paredes (COL)	4 April 1989 (aged 26)
Walter Pedraza (COL)	27 November 1981 (aged 34)
Carlos Quintero (COL)	5 March 1986 (aged 29)
Brayan Ramírez (COL)	20 November 1992 (aged 23)
Carlos Ramírez (COL)	26 October 1994 (aged 21)
Miguel Ángel Rubiano (COL)	3 October 1984 (aged 31)
Cayetano Sarmiento (COL)	28 March 1987 (aged 28)
Rodolfo Torres (COL)	21 March 1987 (aged 28)
Juan Pablo Valencia (COL)	2 May 1988 (aged 27)

== Major wins ==
2012
Stage 4 Giro del Trentino, Darwin Atapuma
Prologue Vuelta a Colombia, Fabio Duarte
Stage 5 Vuelta a Colombia, Juan Pablo Forero
Stage 5 Vuelta a Burgos, Esteban Chaves
Gran Premio Città di Camaiore, Esteban Chaves
Coppa Sabatini, Fabio Duarte
2013
Stage 6 Tour de Pologne, Darwin Atapuma
Stage 1 Tour de l'Ain, Leonardo Duque
Gran Premio Bruno Beghelli, Leonardo Duque
2014
Stage 1 Tour de Langkawi, Dúber Quintero
Colombia Road Race Championships, Miguel Ángel Rubiano
Stage 2 Vuelta a Colombia, Jeffry Romero

== National champions ==
2014
Colombian Road Race Miguel Ángel Rubiano
