= 2017 Vuelta a San Juan =

UCI America Tour

Race details
- Dates: 23–29 January 2017
- Stages: 7
- Distance: 886.1 km (550.6 mi)
- Winning time: 20h 19' 00"

Results
Jersey awarded to the overall winner	Winner	Bauke Mollema (Netherlands)	(Trek–Segafredo)
	Second	Óscar Sevilla (Spain)	(Medellín–Inder)
	Third	Rodolfo Torres (Colombia)	(Androni Giocattoli–Sidermec)
Jersey awarded to the mountains classification winner	Mountains	Franco Germán López (Argentina)	(A.C. Agrupación Virgen de Fátima)
Jersey awarded to the youth classification winner	Youth	Egan Bernal (Colombia)	(Androni Giocattoli–Sidermec)
Jersey awarded to the sprints classification winner	Sprints	Nicolás Naranjo (Argentina)	(A.C. Agrupación Virgen de Fátima)
	Team	Bahrain–Merida	

The 2017 Vuelta a San Juan was a road cycling stage race that took place between 23 and 29 January. It was the 35th edition of the Vuelta a San Juan and the first time it was rated as a 2.1 event on the UCI America Tour calendar.

The race was won by Bauke Mollema for the Trek–Segafredo team; after finishing second to Bahrain–Merida's Ramūnas Navardauskas in the third stage individual time trial, Mollema took the race leader's blue jersey from Navardauskas two days later, atop the Alto Colorado – in a stage won by UAE Abu Dhabi's Rui Costa – and maintained a 14-second race lead to the end of the race. Second place went to Óscar Sevilla (Medellín–Inder), while a further two seconds in arrears, was Androni Giocattoli–Sidermec rider Rodolfo Torres who completed the final podium.

Torres' teammate Egan Bernal won the green jersey for the young rider classification, while riders from the A.C. Agrupación Virgen de Fátima squad claimed all the remaining jerseys: Franco Germán López won the red jersey for the mountains classification, Nicolás Naranjo won the yellow jersey for the sprints classification, while Ricardo Escuela claimed the white and violet jerseys for being the highest-placed rider from the San Juan province and Argentina as a whole. Bahrain–Merida won the teams classification, while Quick-Step Floors won five of the race's seven stages, with two wins apiece for Fernando Gaviria and Maximiliano Richeze and Tom Boonen with one.

== Participating teams ==
As the Vuelta a San Juan was a 2.1 event, a limited number of UCI WorldTeams were able to participate in the race. In total, 26 teams participated in the race: 4 UCI WorldTeams, 6 Professional Continental teams, 10 Continental teams, and 6 national selections.

UCI World Teams

- Bahrain–Merida
- Quick-Step Floors
- Trek–Segafredo
- UAE Abu Dhabi

UCI Professional Continental Teams

- Bardiani–CSF
- UnitedHealthcare
- Nippo–Vini Fantini
- Caja Rural–Seguros RGA
- Wilier Triestina–Selle Italia
- Androni Giocattoli–Sidermec

UCI Continental Teams

- Sindicato de Empleados Publicos de San Juan
- Equipo Continental Municipalidad de Pocito
- Asociación Civil Mardan
- A.C. Agrupación Virgen de Fátima
- Municipalidad de Rawson–Somos Todos
- Los Cascos Esco–AgroPlan
- Italomat–Dogo
- Unieuro Trevigiani–Hemus 1896
- Medellín–Inder
- Equipo Bolivia

National teams

- Italy
- Argentina
- Mexico
- Uruguay
- Brazil
- Chile

== Route ==
The route of the 2017 Vuelta a San Juan consisted of 6 mass start stages and one individual time trial. All stages were centered around the town of San Juan. Most of the stages were relatively flat, except for stage 5, which finished on top of a 2,565 m (8,415 ft) mountain, the Alto Colorado.

Stage schedule
Stage	Date	Route	Distance	Type	Winner
1	23 January	San Juan to San Juan	142.5 km (89 mi)	Flat stage	Fernando Gaviria (COL)
2	24 January	San Juan to San Juan	128.8 km (80 mi)	Hilly stage	Tom Boonen (BEL)
3	25 January	San Juan to San Juan	11.9 km (7 mi)	Individual time trial	Ramūnas Navardauskas (LTU)
4	26 January	San Martín to San Martín	160.5 km (100 mi)	Flat stage	Fernando Gaviria (COL)
5	27 January	Chimbas to Alto Colorado	162.4 km (101 mi)	High mountain stage	Rui Costa (POR)
6	28 January	Pocito to Pocito	168.7 km (105 mi) (Note: Stage reduced from 185.7 km (115 mi) due to extreme heat.)	Flat stage	Maximiliano Richeze (ARG)
7	29 January	San Juan	111.3 km (69 mi) (Note: Stage reduced from 138.2 km (86 mi) due to extreme heat.)	Flat stage	Maximiliano Richeze (ARG)

== Stages ==
=== Stage 1 ===
23 January 2017 — San Juan to San Juan, 142.5 km (89 mi)

Result of Stage 1
Rank	Rider	Team	Time
1	Fernando Gaviria (COL)	Quick-Step Floors	3h 07' 44"
2	Elia Viviani (ITA)	Italy (national team)	+ 0"
3	Nicolas Marini (ITA)	Nippo–Vini Fantini	+ 0"
4	Matteo Malucelli (ITA)	Androni Giocattoli–Sidermec	+ 0"
5	Vincenzo Nibali (ITA)	Bahrain–Merida	+ 0"
6	Tom Boonen (BEL)	Quick-Step Floors	+ 0"
7	Matthias Brändle (AUT)	Trek–Segafredo	+ 0"
8	Alan Ramírez (ARG)	Municipalidad de Rawson–Somos Todos	+ 0"
9	Bauke Mollema (NED)	Trek–Segafredo	+ 0"
10	Óscar Sevilla (ESP)	Medellín–Inder	+ 0"

General classification after Stage 1
Rank	Rider	Team	Time
1	Fernando Gaviria (COL)	Quick-Step Floors	3h 07' 34"
2	Elia Viviani (ITA)	Italy (national team)	+ 4"
3	Franco Germán López (ARG)	A.C. Agrupación Virgen de Fátima	+ 4"
4	Nicolas Marini (ITA)	Nippo–Vini Fantini	+ 6"
5	Higinio Lucero (ARG)	Municipalidad de Rawson–Somos Todos	+ 8"
6	Leonardo Rodríguez (ARG)	Asociación Civil Mardan	+ 8"
7	Rubén Ramos (ARG)	Argentina (national team)	+ 9"
8	Pedro González (ARG)	Equipo Continental Municipalidad de Pocito	+ 9"
9	Matteo Malucelli (ITA)	Androni Giocattoli–Sidermec	+ 10"
10	Vincenzo Nibali (ITA)	Bahrain–Merida	+ 10"

=== Stage 2 ===
24 January 2017 — San Juan to San Juan, 128.8 km (80 mi)

Result of Stage 2
Rank	Rider	Team	Time
1	Tom Boonen (BEL)	Quick-Step Floors	3h 00' 40"
2	Elia Viviani (ITA)	Italy (national team)	+ 0"
3	Matteo Malucelli (ITA)	Androni Giocattoli–Sidermec	+ 0"
4	Ricardo Escuela (ARG)	A.C. Agrupación Virgen de Fátima	+ 0"
5	Andrea Guardini (ITA)	UAE Abu Dhabi	+ 0"
6	Ramūnas Navardauskas (LTU)	Bahrain–Merida	+ 0"
7	Luke Keough (USA)	UnitedHealthcare	+ 0"
8	Manuel Belletti (ITA)	Wilier Triestina–Selle Italia	+ 0"
9	Eugenio Alafaci (ITA)	Trek–Segafredo	+ 0"
10	Mattia Viel (ITA)	Unieuro Trevigiani–Hemus 1896	+ 0"

General classification after Stage 2
Rank	Rider	Team	Time
1	Elia Viviani (ITA)	Italy (national team)	6h 08' 12"
2	Fernando Gaviria (COL)	Quick-Step Floors	+ 1"
3	Tom Boonen (BEL)	Quick-Step Floors	+ 2"
4	Franco Germán López (ARG)	A.C. Agrupación Virgen de Fátima	+ 6"
5	Matteo Malucelli (ITA)	Androni Giocattoli–Sidermec	+ 8"
6	Vincenzo Nibali (ITA)	Bahrain–Merida	+ 12"
7	Gavin Mannion (USA)	UnitedHealthcare	+ 12"
8	Duilio Ramos (ARG)	Asociación Civil Mardan	+ 12"
9	Óscar Sevilla (ESP)	Medellín–Inder	+ 12"
10	Bauke Mollema (NED)	Trek–Segafredo	+ 12"

=== Stage 3 ===
25 January 2017 — San Juan, 11.9 km (7 mi), individual time trial (ITT)

Result of Stage 3
Rank	Rider	Team	Time
1	Ramūnas Navardauskas (LTU)	Bahrain–Merida	14' 03"
2	Bauke Mollema (NED)	Trek–Segafredo	+ 3"
3	Matthias Brändle (AUT)	Trek–Segafredo	+ 7"
4	Rémi Cavagna (FRA)	Quick-Step Floors	+ 7"
5	Walter Vargas (COL)	Medellín–Inder	+ 17"
6	Sebastian Trillini (ARG)	Italomat–Dogo	+ 19"
7	Óscar Sevilla (ESP)	Medellín–Inder	+ 19"
8	Laureano Rosas (ARG)	Argentina (national team)	+ 21"
9	Ricardo Escuela (ARG)	A.C. Agrupación Virgen de Fátima	+ 32"
10	Kanstantsin Sivtsov (BLR)	Bahrain–Merida	+ 32"

General classification after Stage 3
Rank	Rider	Team	Time
1	Ramūnas Navardauskas (LTU)	Bahrain–Merida	6h 22' 27"
2	Bauke Mollema (NED)	Trek–Segafredo	+ 3"
3	Matthias Brändle (AUT)	Trek–Segafredo	+ 7"
4	Rémi Cavagna (FRA)	Quick-Step Floors	+ 7"
5	Sebastian Trillini (ARG)	Italomat–Dogo	+ 19"
6	Óscar Sevilla (ESP)	Medellín–Inder	+ 19"
7	Laureano Rosas (ARG)	Argentina (national team)	+ 21"
8	Elia Viviani (ITA)	Italy (national team)	+ 23"
9	Tom Boonen (BEL)	Quick-Step Floors	+ 29"
10	Ricardo Escuela (ARG)	A.C. Agrupación Virgen de Fátima	+ 32"

=== Stage 4 ===
26 January 2017 — San Martín to San Martín, 160.5 km (100 mi)

Result of Stage 4
Rank	Rider	Team	Time
1	Fernando Gaviria (COL)	Quick-Step Floors	3h 34' 44"
2	Elia Viviani (ITA)	Italy (national team)	+ 0"
3	Nicola Ruffoni (ITA)	Bardiani–CSF	+ 0"
4	Manuel Belletti (ITA)	Wilier Triestina–Selle Italia	+ 0"
5	Luke Keough (USA)	UnitedHealthcare	+ 0"
6	Andrea Guardini (ITA)	UAE Abu Dhabi	+ 0"
7	Carlos Alzate (COL)	UnitedHealthcare	+ 0"
8	Marco Coledan (ITA)	Trek–Segafredo	+ 0"
9	Laureano Rosas (ARG)	Argentina (national team)	+ 0"
10	Ramūnas Navardauskas (LTU)	Bahrain–Merida	+ 0"

General classification after Stage 4
Rank	Rider	Team	Time
1	Ramūnas Navardauskas (LTU)	Bahrain–Merida	9h 57' 11"
2	Bauke Mollema (NED)	Trek–Segafredo	+ 3"
3	Matthias Brändle (AUT)	Trek–Segafredo	+ 7"
4	Rémi Cavagna (FRA)	Quick-Step Floors	+ 7"
5	Elia Viviani (ITA)	Italy (national team)	+ 17"
6	Sebastian Trillini (ARG)	Italomat–Dogo	+ 19"
7	Óscar Sevilla (ESP)	Medellín–Inder	+ 19"
8	Laureano Rosas (ARG)	Argentina (national team)	+ 21"
9	Tom Boonen (BEL)	Quick-Step Floors	+ 29"
10	Ricardo Escuela (ARG)	A.C. Agrupación Virgen de Fátima	+ 32"

=== Stage 5 ===
27 January 2017 — Chimbas to Alto Colorado, 162.4 km (101 mi)

Result of Stage 5
Rank	Rider	Team	Time
1	Rui Costa (POR)	UAE Abu Dhabi	4h 15' 04"
2	Rodolfo Torres (COL)	Androni Giocattoli–Sidermec	+ 3"
3	Ricardo Escuela (ARG)	A.C. Agrupación Virgen de Fátima	+ 7"
4	Óscar Sevilla (ESP)	Medellín–Inder	+ 10"
5	Bauke Mollema (NED)	Trek–Segafredo	+ 12"
6	Egan Bernal (COL)	Androni Giocattoli–Sidermec	+ 14"
7	Eduardo Sepúlveda (ARG)	Argentina (national team)	+ 14"
8	Laureano Rosas (ARG)	Argentina (national team)	+ 21"
9	Eduardo Corte (MEX)	Mexico (national team)	+ 57"
10	Vincenzo Nibali (ITA)	Bahrain–Merida	+ 57"

General classification after Stage 5
Rank	Rider	Team	Time
1	Bauke Mollema (NED)	Trek–Segafredo	14h 12' 30"
2	Óscar Sevilla (ESP)	Medellín–Inder	+ 14"
3	Rodolfo Torres (COL)	Androni Giocattoli–Sidermec	+ 16"
4	Ricardo Escuela (ARG)	A.C. Agrupación Virgen de Fátima	+ 20"
5	Rui Costa (POR)	UAE Abu Dhabi	+ 26"
6	Laureano Rosas (ARG)	Argentina (national team)	+ 27"
7	Ramūnas Navardauskas (LTU)	Bahrain–Merida	+ 52"
8	Vincenzo Nibali (ITA)	Bahrain–Merida	+ 1' 17"
9	Egan Bernal (COL)	Androni Giocattoli–Sidermec	+ 1' 29"
10	Pieter Serry (BEL)	Quick-Step Floors	+ 1' 31"

=== Stage 6 ===
28 January 2017 — Pocito to Pocito, 168.7 km (105 mi)

Result of Stage 6
Rank	Rider	Team	Time
1	Maximiliano Richeze (ARG)	Quick-Step Floors	3h 48' 47"
2	Oliviero Troia (ITA)	UAE Abu Dhabi	+ 0"
3	Germán Tivani (ARG)	Unieuro Trevigiani–Hemus 1896	+ 0"
4	Matteo Malucelli (ITA)	Androni Giocattoli–Sidermec	+ 52"
5	Manuel Belletti (ITA)	Wilier Triestina–Selle Italia	+ 52"
6	José Luis Rivera (ARG)	Equipo Continental Municipalidad de Pocito	+ 52"
7	Mattia Viel (ITA)	Unieuro Trevigiani–Hemus 1896	+ 52"
8	Ramūnas Navardauskas (LTU)	Bahrain–Merida	+ 52"
9	Nicolas Marini (ITA)	Nippo–Vini Fantini	+ 52"
10	Luke Keough (USA)	UnitedHealthcare	+ 52"

General classification after Stage 6
Rank	Rider	Team	Time
1	Bauke Mollema (NED)	Trek–Segafredo	18h 02' 09"
2	Óscar Sevilla (ESP)	Medellín–Inder	+ 14"
3	Rodolfo Torres (COL)	Androni Giocattoli–Sidermec	+ 16"
4	Ricardo Escuela (ARG)	A.C. Agrupación Virgen de Fátima	+ 20"
5	Rui Costa (POR)	UAE Abu Dhabi	+ 26"
6	Laureano Rosas (ARG)	Argentina (national team)	+ 27"
7	Ramūnas Navardauskas (LTU)	Bahrain–Merida	+ 52"
8	Vincenzo Nibali (ITA)	Bahrain–Merida	+ 1' 17"
9	Egan Bernal (COL)	Androni Giocattoli–Sidermec	+ 1' 29"
10	Pieter Serry (BEL)	Quick-Step Floors	+ 1' 31"

=== Stage 7 ===
29 January 2017 — San Juan to San Juan, 111.3 km (69 mi)

Result of Stage 7
Rank	Rider	Team	Time
1	Maximiliano Richeze (ARG)	Quick-Step Floors	2h 16' 48"
2	Tom Boonen (BEL)	Quick-Step Floors	+ 3"
3	Matteo Malucelli (ITA)	Androni Giocattoli–Sidermec	+ 3"
4	Andrea Guardini (ITA)	UAE Abu Dhabi	+ 3"
5	Nicola Ruffoni (ITA)	Bardiani–CSF	+ 3"
6	José Luis Rivera (ARG)	Equipo Continental Municipalidad de Pocito	+ 3"
7	Ramūnas Navardauskas (LTU)	Bahrain–Merida	+ 3"
8	Attilio Viviani (ITA)	Italy (national team)	+ 3"
9	Daniel Juárez (ARG)	Asociación Civil Mardan	+ 3"
10	Mattia Viel (ITA)	Unieuro Trevigiani–Hemus 1896	+ 3"

Final general classification
Rank	Rider	Team	Time
1	Bauke Mollema (NED)	Trek–Segafredo	20h 19' 00"
2	Óscar Sevilla (ESP)	Medellín–Inder	+ 14"
3	Rodolfo Torres (COL)	Androni Giocattoli–Sidermec	+ 16"
4	Ricardo Escuela (ARG)	A.C. Agrupación Virgen de Fátima	+ 20"
5	Rui Costa (POR)	UAE Abu Dhabi	+ 26"
6	Laureano Rosas (ARG)	Argentina (national team)	+ 27"
7	Ramūnas Navardauskas (LTU)	Bahrain–Merida	+ 49"
8	Vincenzo Nibali (ITA)	Bahrain–Merida	+ 1' 15"
9	Egan Bernal (COL)	Androni Giocattoli–Sidermec	+ 1' 29"
10	Pieter Serry (BEL)	Quick-Step Floors	+ 1' 31"

== Classification leadership table ==
There were four official classifications in the 2017 Vuelta a San Juan, with four corresponding leader's jerseys. The blue jersey was for the leader in the general classification, the yellow jersey for the leader in the sprint classification, the red jersey for the leader in the mountain classification, and the green jersey for the leader in the under 23 classification.

Next to these classifications, there were subclassifications for Argentine riders, and riders from the province of San Juan, while there was also a classification for teams.

Stage	Winner	General classification	Mountains classification	Sprint classification	Young rider classification	Argentine rider classification	Team classification
1	Fernando Gaviria	Fernando Gaviria	Franco Germán López	Franco Germán López	Leonardo Rodríguez	Franco Germán López	Androni Giocattoli–Sidermec
2	Tom Boonen	Elia Viviani	Pedro González	Franco Germán López	Duilio Ramos	Franco Germán López	Quick-Step Floors
3	Ramūnas Navardauskas	Ramūnas Navardauskas	Pedro González	Franco Germán López	Rémi Cavagna	Sebastian Trillini	Trek–Segafredo
4	Fernando Gaviria	Ramūnas Navardauskas	Pedro González	Gerardo Tivani	Rémi Cavagna	Sebastian Trillini	Trek–Segafredo
5	Rui Costa	Bauke Mollema	Franco Germán López	Nicolás Naranjo	Egan Bernal	Ricardo Escuela	Bahrain–Merida
6	Maximiliano Richeze	Bauke Mollema	Franco Germán López	Nicolás Naranjo	Egan Bernal	Ricardo Escuela	Bahrain–Merida
7	Maximiliano Richeze	Bauke Mollema	Franco Germán López	Nicolás Naranjo	Egan Bernal	Ricardo Escuela	Bahrain–Merida
Final		Bauke Mollema	Franco Germán López	Nicolás Naranjo	Egan Bernal	Ricardo Escuela	Bahrain–Merida
