= 2018 Vuelta a San Juan =

2018 UCI America Tour

Race details
- Dates: January 21–28, 2018
- Stages: 7
- Distance: 967.6 km (601.2 mi)
- Winning time: 21h 59' 57"

Results
	Winner	Óscar Sevilla (ESP)
	Second	Filippo Ganna (ITA)
	Third	Rodolfo Torres (COL)
	Mountains	Daniel Juárez (ARG)
	Youth	Filippo Ganna (ITA)
	Sprints	Adrián Richeze (ARG)
	Team	Medellín

The 2018 Vuelta a San Juan was a road cycling stage race that took place in the San Juan Province of Argentina between 21 and 28 January 2018. The race was rated as a 2.1 event as part of the 2018 UCI America Tour, and was the 36th edition of the Vuelta a San Juan. Initially, the race was won by Gonzalo Najar, who was later disqualified for a failed doping test. The result was then given to the rider originally in second place, Óscar Sevilla.

== Teams ==
Twenty-seven teams started the race. Each team had a maximum of seven riders:

UCI WorldTeams

- Bahrain–Merida
- Trek–Segafredo
- Movistar Team
- Lotto–Soudal
- Quick-Step Floors
- UAE Team Emirates
- Bora–Hansgrohe

UCI Professional Continental teams

- Israel Cycling Academy
- Androni Giocattoli–Sidermec
- Caja Rural–Seguros RGA
- UnitedHealthcare
- Wilier Triestina–Selle Italia

UCI Continental teams

- Sindicato de Empleados Publicos de San Juan
- Asociación Civil Mardan
- Municipalidad de Rawson
- Medellín
- Canel's–Specialized
- Equipo Continental Municipalidad de Pocito
- A.C. Agrupación Virgen de Fátima
- Trevigiani Phonix–Hemus 1896
- Coldeportes–Zenú–Sello Rojo

National teams

- Italy
- Argentina
- Chile
- Cuba
- Mexico
- Uruguay

== Route ==
Stage characteristics and winners
Stage	Date	Course	Distance	Type	Stage winner
1	January 21	San Juan to Pocito	148.9 km (92.5 mi)	Flat stage	Fernando Gaviria (COL)
2	January 22	Lake Punta Negra to Lake Punta Negra	149.9 km (93.1 mi)	Flat stage	Román Villalobos (CRC)
3	January 23	San Juan to San Juan	14.4 km (8.9 mi)	Individual time trial	Ryan Mullen (IRL)
4	January 24	San José de Jáchal to Villa San Martín	182.2 km (113.2 mi)	Flat stage	Maximiliano Richeze (ARG)
	January 25			Rest day	
5	January 26	San Martín to Alto Colorado	169.5 km (105.3 mi)	Mountain stage	Gonzalo Najar (ARG)
6	January 27	San Juan to San Juan	152.6 km (94.8 mi)	Hilly stage	Jelle Wallays (BEL)
7	January 28	San Juan to San Juan	141.3 km (87.8 mi)	Flat stage	Giacomo Nizzolo (ITA)

== Stages ==
=== Stage 1 ===
Stage 1 result

Rank	Rider	Team	Time
1	Fernando Gaviria (COL)	Quick-Step Floors	3h 15' 23"
2	Niccolò Bonifazio (ITA)	Bahrain–Merida	s.t.
3	Matteo Pelucchi (ITA)	Bora–Hansgrohe	s.t.
4	Giacomo Nizzolo (ITA)	Trek–Segafredo	s.t.
5	Manuel Belletti (ITA)	Androni Giocattoli–Sidermec	s.t.
6	Mauro Richeze (ARG)	A.C. Agrupación Virgen de Fátima	s.t.
7	Héctor Lucero (ARG)	Equipo Continental Municipalidad de Pocito	s.t.
8	Alexandr Riabushenko (BLR)	UAE Team Emirates	s.t.
9	Maximiliano Richeze (ARG)	Quick-Step Floors	s.t.
10	Manuel Peñalver (ESP)	Trevigiani Phonix–Hemus 1896	s.t.

General classification after Stage 1

Rank	Rider	Team	Time
1	Fernando Gaviria (COL)	Quick-Step Floors	3h 15' 13"
2	Niccolò Bonifazio (ITA)	Bahrain–Merida	+ 4"
3	Matteo Pelucchi (ITA)	Bora–Hansgrohe	+ 6"
4	Daniel Juárez (ARG)	Asociación Civil Mardan	+ 7"
5	Giacomo Nizzolo (ITA)	Trek–Segafredo	+ 10"
6	Manuel Belletti (ITA)	Androni Giocattoli–Sidermec	s.t.
7	Mauro Richeze (ARG)	A.C. Agrupación Virgen de Fátima	s.t.
8	Héctor Lucero (ARG)	Equipo Continental Municipalidad de Pocito	s.t.
9	Alexandr Riabushenko (BLR)	UAE Team Emirates	s.t.
10	Maximiliano Richeze (ARG)	Quick-Step Floors	s.t.

=== Stage 2 ===
Stage 2 result

Rank	Rider	Team	Time
1	Román Villalobos (CRC)	Canel's–Specialized	3h 25' 06"
2	Ricardo Escuela (ARG)	A.C. Agrupación Virgen de Fátima	s.t.
3	Tiesj Benoot (BEL)	Lotto–Soudal	s.t.
4	Filippo Ganna (ITA)	UAE Team Emirates	s.t.
5	Óscar Sevilla (ESP)	Medellín	s.t.
6	Rafał Majka (POL)	Bora–Hansgrohe	s.t.
7	Gonzalo Najar (ARG)	Sindicato de Empleados Publicos de San Juan	s.t.
8	Alexander Cataford (CAN)	UnitedHealthcare	s.t.
9	Guillaume Boivin (CAN)	Israel Cycling Academy	s.t.
10	Lluís Mas (ESP)	Caja Rural–Seguros RGA	s.t.

General classification after Stage 2

Rank	Rider	Team	Time
1	Román Villalobos (CRC)	Canel's–Specialized	6h 40' 19"
2	Ricardo Escuela (ARG)	A.C. Agrupación Virgen de Fátima	+ 4"
3	Tiesj Benoot (BEL)	Lotto–Soudal	+ 6"
4	Fernando Gaviria (COL)	Quick-Step Floors	+ 8"
5	Manuel Belletti (ITA)	Androni Giocattoli–Sidermec	+ 10"
6	Filippo Ganna (ITA)	UAE Team Emirates	s.t.
7	Miguel Ángel Rubiano (COL)	Coldeportes–Zenú–Sello Rojo	s.t.
8	Lluís Mas (ESP)	Caja Rural–Seguros RGA	s.t.
9	Óscar Sevilla (ESP)	Medellín	s.t.
10	Jens Keukeleire (BEL)	Lotto–Soudal	s.t.

=== Stage 3 ===
Stage 3 result

Rank	Rider	Team	Time
1	Ryan Mullen (IRL)	Trek–Segafredo	17' 43"
2	Filippo Ganna (ITA)	UAE Team Emirates	+ 25"
3	Rafał Majka (POL)	Bora–Hansgrohe	+ 30"
4	Gregory Daniel (USA)	Trek–Segafredo	s.t.
5	Óscar Sevilla (ESP)	Medellín	+ 36"
6	Winner Anacona (COL)	Movistar Team	+ 38"
7	Omar Mendoza (COL)	Medellín	+ 44"
8	Rémi Cavagna (FRA)	Quick-Step Floors	s.t.
9	Eduardo Sepúlveda (ARG)	Movistar Team	+ 50"
10	Jhonatan Narváez (ECU)	Quick-Step Floors	+ 52"

General classification after Stage 3

Rank	Rider	Team	Time
1	Filippo Ganna (ITA)	UAE Team Emirates	6h 58' 37"
2	Rafał Majka (POL)	Bora–Hansgrohe	+ 5"
3	Óscar Sevilla (ESP)	Medellín	+ 11"
4	Omar Mendoza (COL)	Medellín	+ 19"
5	Eduardo Sepúlveda (ARG)	Movistar Team	+ 25"
6	Ricardo Escuela (ARG)	A.C. Agrupación Virgen de Fátima	+ 27"
7	Winner Anacona (COL)	Movistar Team	+ 35"
8	Jhonatan Narváez (ECU)	Quick-Step Floors	+ 43"
9	Kanstantsin Sivtsov (BLR)	Bahrain–Merida	s.t.
10	Mattia Cattaneo (ITA)	Androni Giocattoli–Sidermec	+ 45"

=== Stage 4 ===
Stage 4 result

Rank	Rider	Team	Time
1	Maximiliano Richeze (ARG)	Quick-Step Floors	4h 31' 48"
2	Giacomo Nizzolo (ITA)	Trek–Segafredo	s.t.
3	Matteo Pelucchi (ITA)	Bora–Hansgrohe	s.t.
4	Mihkel Räim (EST)	Israel Cycling Academy	s.t.
5	Niccolò Bonifazio (ITA)	Bahrain–Merida	s.t.
6	Edwin Ávila (COL)	Israel Cycling Academy	s.t.
7	Jens Keukeleire (BEL)	Lotto–Soudal	s.t.
8	Mauro Richeze (ARG)	A.C. Agrupación Virgen de Fátima	s.t.
9	Álvaro Hodeg (COL)	Quick-Step Floors	s.t.
10	Travis McCabe (USA)	UnitedHealthcare	s.t.

General classification after Stage 4

Rank	Rider	Team	Time
1	Filippo Ganna (ITA)	UAE Team Emirates	11h 30' 25"
2	Rafał Majka (POL)	Bora–Hansgrohe	+ 5"
3	Óscar Sevilla (ESP)	Medellín	+ 11"
4	Omar Mendoza (COL)	Medellín	+ 19"
5	Jhonatan Narváez (ECU)	Quick-Step Floors	+ 43"
6	Kanstantsin Sivtsov (BLR)	Bahrain–Merida	s.t.
7	Mattia Cattaneo (ITA)	Androni Giocattoli–Sidermec	+ 45"
8	Tiesj Benoot (BEL)	Lotto–Soudal	+ 50"
9	Rémi Cavagna (FRA)	Quick-Step Floors	s.t.
10	Rodolfo Torres (COL)	Androni Giocattoli–Sidermec	+ 52"

=== Stage 5 ===
Stage 5 result

Rank	Rider	Team	Time
~~1~~	~~Gonzalo Najar (ARG)~~	~~Sindicato de Empleados Publicos de San Juan~~	~~4h 16' 26"~~
2	Óscar Sevilla (ESP)	Medellín	+ 1' 58"
3	Rodolfo Torres (COL)	Androni Giocattoli–Sidermec	+ 2' 05"
4	Román Villalobos (CRC)	Canel's–Specialized	+ 2' 15"
5	Tiesj Benoot (BEL)	Lotto–Soudal	+ 2' 23"
6	Eduardo Sepúlveda (ARG)	Movistar Team	s.t.
7	Filippo Ganna (ITA)	UAE Team Emirates	s.t.
8	Cristian Camilo Muñoz (COL)	Coldeportes–Zenú–Sello Rojo	+ 2' 52"
9	Dayer Quintana (COL)	Movistar Team	+ 2' 57"
10	Darwin Atapuma (COL)	UAE Team Emirates	s.t.

General classification after Stage 5

Rank	Rider	Team	Time
~~1~~	~~Gonzalo Najar (ARG)~~	~~Sindicato de Empleados Publicos de San Juan~~	~~15h 47' 52"~~
2	Óscar Sevilla (ESP)	Medellín	+ 1' 02"
3	Filippo Ganna (ITA)	UAE Team Emirates	+ 1' 22"
4	Rodolfo Torres (COL)	Androni Giocattoli–Sidermec	+ 1' 52"
5	Rafał Majka (POL)	Bora–Hansgrohe	+ 2' 11"
6	Tiesj Benoot (BEL)	Lotto–Soudal	+ 2' 12"
7	Omar Mendoza (COL)	Medellín	+ 2' 22"
8	Dayer Quintana (COL)	Movistar Team	+ 3' 09"
9	Kanstantsin Sivtsov (BLR)	Bahrain–Merida	+ 3' 30"
10	Rémi Cavagna (FRA)	Quick-Step Floors	+ 3' 37"

=== Stage 6 ===
Stage 6 result

Rank	Rider	Team	Time
1	Jelle Wallays (BEL)	Lotto–Soudal	3h 15' 28"
2	Róbigzon Oyola (COL)	Medellín	+ 2"
3	Travis McCabe (USA)	UnitedHealthcare	s.t.
4	Iljo Keisse (BEL)	Quick-Step Floors	s.t.
5	Eduardo Sepúlveda (ARG)	Movistar Team	s.t.
6	Miguel Ángel Rubiano (COL)	Coldeportes–Zenú–Sello Rojo	s.t.
7	Gerardo Tivani (ARG)	Equipo Continental Municipalidad de Pocito	s.t.
8	Eugenio Alafaci (ITA)	Trek–Segafredo	s.t.
9	Fausto Masnada (ITA)	Androni Giocattoli–Sidermec	s.t.
10	Mattia Bais (ITA)	Italy	+ 8"

General classification after Stage 6

Rank	Rider	Team	Time
1	~~Gonzalo Najar (ARG)~~	~~Sindicato de Empleados Publicos de San Juan~~	~~19h 03' 43"~~
2	Óscar Sevilla (ESP)	Medellín	+ 51"
3	Filippo Ganna (ITA)	UAE Team Emirates	+ 1' 11"
4	Rodolfo Torres (COL)	Androni Giocattoli–Sidermec	+ 1' 41"
5	Rafał Majka (POL)	Bora–Hansgrohe	+ 2' 00"
6	Tiesj Benoot (BEL)	Lotto–Soudal	+ 2' 01"
7	Omar Mendoza (COL)	Medellín	+ 2' 11"
8	Dayer Quintana (COL)	Movistar Team	+ 2' 58"
9	Kanstantsin Sivtsov (BLR)	Bahrain–Merida	+ 3' 19"
10	Rémi Cavagna (FRA)	Quick-Step Floors	+ 3' 26"

=== Stage 7 ===
Stage 7 result

Rank	Rider	Team	Time
1	Giacomo Nizzolo (ITA)	Trek–Segafredo	2h 55' 23"
2	Maximiliano Richeze (ARG)	Quick-Step Floors	s.t.
3	Álvaro Hodeg (COL)	Quick-Step Floors	s.t.
4	Pascal Ackermann (GER)	Bora–Hansgrohe	s.t.
5	Niccolò Bonifazio (ITA)	Bahrain–Merida	s.t.
6	Manuel Peñalver (ESP)	Trevigiani Phonix–Hemus 1896	s.t.
7	Federico Burchio (ITA)	Italy	s.t.
8	Jens Keukeleire (BEL)	Lotto–Soudal	s.t.
9	Guillaume Boivin (CAN)	Israel Cycling Academy	s.t.
10	Carlos Alzate (COL)	UnitedHealthcare	s.t.

== Classifications ==
Final general classification

Rank	Rider	Team	Time
~~1~~	~~Gonzalo Najar (ARG)~~	~~Sindicato de Empleados Publicos de San Juan~~	~~21h 59' 06"~~
1	Óscar Sevilla (ESP)	Medellín	+ 51"
2	Filippo Ganna (ITA)	UAE Team Emirates	+ 1' 11"
3	Rodolfo Torres (COL)	Androni Giocattoli–Sidermec	+ 1' 41"
4	Rafał Majka (POL)	Bora–Hansgrohe	+ 1' 58"
5	Tiesj Benoot (BEL)	Lotto–Soudal	+ 1' 59"
6	Omar Mendoza (COL)	Medellín	+ 2' 08"
7	Dayer Quintana (COL)	Movistar Team	+ 2' 58"
8	Kanstantsin Sivtsov (BLR)	Bahrain–Merida	+ 3' 19"
9	Rémi Cavagna (FRA)	Quick-Step Floors	+ 3' 26"

Final points classification

Rank	Rider	Team	Points
1	Adrián Richeze (ARG)	A.C. Agrupación Virgen de Fátima	17
2	Daniel Juárez (ARG)	Asociación Civil Mardan	8
3	Gerardo Tivani (ARG)	Equipo Continental Municipalidad de Pocito	8
4	Carlos Alzate (COL)	UnitedHealthcare	7
5	Michael Kolář (SVK)	Bora–Hansgrohe	5
6	Mauro Richeze (ARG)	A.C. Agrupación Virgen de Fátima	4
7	Omar Mendoza (COL)	Medellín	3
8	Pablo Alarcón (CHI)	Canel's–Specialized	3

Final mountains classification

Rank	Rider	Team	Points
1	Daniel Juárez (ARG)	Asociación Civil Mardan	29
2	Alex Cano (COL)	Coldeportes–Zenú–Sello Rojo	28
3	Pablo Alarcón (CHI)	Canel's–Specialized	22
4	Gerardo Tivani (ARG)	Equipo Continental Municipalidad de Pocito	16
~~5~~	~~Gonzalo Najar (ARG)~~	~~Sindicato de Empleados Publicos de San Juan~~	~~10~~
5	Daniel Eaton (USA)	UnitedHealthcare	10
6	Ignacio Prado (MEX)	Sindicato de Empleados Publicos de San Juan	9
7	Óscar Sevilla (ESP)	Medellín	8

Final young rider classification

Rank	Rider	Team	Time
1	Filippo Ganna (ITA)	UAE Team Emirates	22h 00' 17"
2	Jhonatan Narváez (ECU)	Quick-Step Floors	+ 3' 56"
3	Miguel Flórez (COL)	Wilier Triestina–Selle Italia	+ 9' 47"
4	Cristian Camilo Muñoz (COL)	Coldeportes–Zenú–Sello Rojo	+ 10' 36"
5	Javier Montoya (COL)	Trevigiani Phonix–Hemus 1896	+ 13' 43"
6	Atilio Pinno (BRA)		+ 16' 49"
7	Abderrahim Zahiri (MAR)	Trevigiani Phonix–Hemus 1896	+ 21' 19"
8	Filippo Rochetti (ITA)		+ 21' 24"

Final teams classification

Rank	Team	Time
1	Medellín	66h 03' 58"
2	Androni Giocattoli–Sidermec	+ 2' 23"
3	Bora–Hansgrohe	+ 12' 48"
4	Movistar Team	+ 16' 43"
5	Quick-Step Floors	+ 17' 22"
6	Sindicato de Empleados Publicos de San Juan	+ 17' 41"
7	Lotto–Soudal	+ 18' 44"
8	Trek–Segafredo	+ 19' 25"
9	UAE Team Emirates	+ 20' 36"
10	Coldeportes–Zenú–Sello Rojo	+ 23' 04"

== Classification leadership table ==
Stage	Winner	General classification	Mountains classification	Sprints classification	Young rider classification
1	Fernando Gaviria	Fernando Gaviria	Pablo Anchieri	Adrián Richeze	Manuel Peñalver
2	Román Villalobos	Román Villalobos	Ignacio Prado	Adrián Richeze	Filippo Ganna
3	Ryan Mullen	Filippo Ganna	Ignacio Prado	Adrián Richeze	Filippo Ganna
4	Maximiliano Richeze	Filippo Ganna	Pablo Alarcón	Adrián Richeze	Filippo Ganna
5	~~Gonzalo Najar~~	~~Gonzalo Najar~~	Daniel Juárez	Adrián Richeze	Filippo Ganna
6	Jelle Wallays	~~Gonzalo Najar~~	Daniel Juárez	Adrián Richeze	Filippo Ganna
7	Giacomo Nizzolo	~~Gonzalo Najar~~	Daniel Juárez	Adrián Richeze	Filippo Ganna
Classements finals		~~Gonzalo Najar~~	Daniel Juárez	Adrián Richeze	Filippo Ganna
