= 2019 Vuelta a San Juan =

2019 UCI America Tour

Race details
- Dates: January 27–February 3, 2019
- Stages: 7
- Distance: 955.2 km (593.5 mi)
- Winning time: 22h 09' 21"

Results
| | Winner | Winner Anacona (COL) |
| | Second | Julian Alaphilippe (FRA) |
| | Third | Óscar Sevilla (ESP) |

The 2019 Vuelta a San Juan was a road cycling stage race that took place in the San Juan Province of Argentina between 27 January and 3 February 2019. The race was rated as a 2.1 event as part of the 2019 UCI America Tour, and was the 37th edition of the Vuelta a San Juan.

== Teams ==
Twenty-seven teams started the race. Each team had a maximum of seven riders:

UCI WorldTeams

- Bora–Hansgrohe
- UAE Team Emirates
- Movistar Team
- Team Dimension Data
- Deceuninck–Quick-Step
- Lotto–Soudal

UCI Professional Continental teams

- Caja Rural–Seguros RGA
- Androni Giocattoli–Sidermec
- Nippo–Vini Fantini–Faizanè
- Israel Cycling Academy
- Neri Sottoli–Selle Italia–KTM

UCI Continental teams

- Equipo Continental Municipalidad de Pocito
- A.C. Agrupación Virgen de Fátima
- Start Cycling Team
- Medellín
- Sporting / Tavira
- Asociación Civil Mardan
- Municipalidad de Rawson
- Biesse–Carrera
- Beltrami TSA Hopplà Petroli Firenze

National teams

- Argentina
- Chile
- Brazil
- Mexico
- Cuba
- Uruguay
- Peru

== Route ==
Stage characteristics and winners
| Stage | Date | Course | Distance | Type | Stage winner |
|---|---|---|---|---|---|
| 1 | January 27 | San Juan to Pocito | 159.1 km (98.9 mi) | Flat stage | Fernando Gaviria (COL) |
| 2 | January 28 | Chimbas to Lake Punta Negra | 160 km (99 mi) | Hilly stage | Julian Alaphilippe (FRA) |
| 3 | January 29 | Pocito to Pocito | 12 km (7.5 mi) | Individual time trial | Julian Alaphilippe (FRA) |
| 4 | January 30 | San José de Jáchal to Villa San Agustín | 185.8 km (115.5 mi) | Hilly stage | Fernando Gaviria (COL) |
| | January 31 | | | Rest day | |
| 5 | February 1 | San Martín to Alto Colorado | 169.5 km (105.3 mi) | Mountain stage | Winner Anacona (COL) |
| 6 | February 2 | Autódromo El Villicúm to Autódromo El Villicúm | 183.5 km (114.0 mi) | Flat stage | Germán Tivani (ARG) |
| 7 | February 3 | San Juan to San Juan | 141.3 km (87.8 mi) | Flat stage | Sam Bennett (IRL) |

== Stages ==
=== Stage 1 ===
Stage 1 result

| Rank | Rider | Team | Time |
|---|---|---|---|
| 1 | Fernando Gaviria (COL) | UAE Team Emirates | 3h 50' 12" |
| 2 | Matteo Malucelli (ITA) | Caja Rural–Seguros RGA | s.t. |
| 3 | Sam Bennett (IRL) | Bora–Hansgrohe | s.t. |
| 4 | Luca Pacioni (ITA) | Neri Sottoli–Selle Italia–KTM | s.t. |
| 5 | Álvaro Hodeg (COL) | Deceuninck–Quick-Step | s.t. |
| 6 | Rudy Barbier (FRA) | Israel Cycling Academy | s.t. |
| 7 | Ricardo Escuela (ARG) | A.C. Agrupación Virgen de Fátima | s.t. |
| 8 | Mark Cavendish (GBR) | Team Dimension Data | s.t. |
| 9 | Peter Sagan (SVK) | Bora–Hansgrohe | s.t. |
| 10 | Manuel Belletti (ITA) | Androni Giocattoli–Sidermec | s.t. |

General classification after Stage 1

| Rank | Rider | Team | Time |
|---|---|---|---|
| 1 | Fernando Gaviria (COL) | UAE Team Emirates | 3h 50' 02" |
| 2 | Matteo Malucelli (ITA) | Caja Rural–Seguros RGA | + 4" |
| 3 | Sam Bennett (IRL) | Bora–Hansgrohe | + 6" |
| 4 | Maximiliano Navarrete (ARG) | Argentina | + 7" |
| 5 | Gerardo Tivani (ARG) | Equipo Continental Municipalidad de Pocito | s.t. |
| 6 | Tiago Machado (POR) | Sporting / Tavira | + 8" |
| 7 | Víctor Arroyo (ARG) | Argentina | s.t. |
| 8 | Emiliano Contreras (ARG) | Asociación Civil Mardan | + 9" |
| 9 | Alejandro Osorio (COL) | Nippo–Vini Fantini–Faizanè | s.t. |
| 10 | Luca Pacioni (ITA) | Neri Sottoli–Selle Italia–KTM | + 10" |

=== Stage 2 ===
Stage 2 result

| Rank | Rider | Team | Time |
|---|---|---|---|
| 1 | Julian Alaphilippe (FRA) | Deceuninck–Quick-Step | 3h 11' 33" |
| 2 | Simone Consonni (ITA) | UAE Team Emirates | s.t. |
| 3 | Peter Sagan (SVK) | Bora–Hansgrohe | s.t. |
| 4 | Jens Keukeleire (BEL) | Lotto–Soudal | s.t. |
| 5 | Daniel Zamora (ARG) | A.C. Agrupación Virgen de Fátima | s.t. |
| 6 | Carlos Barbero (ESP) | Movistar Team | s.t. |
| 7 | Richard Carapaz (ECU) | Movistar Team | s.t. |
| 8 | Nicolás Tivani (ARG) | A.C. Agrupación Virgen de Fátima | s.t. |
| 9 | Francesco Gavazzi (ITA) | Androni Giocattoli–Sidermec | s.t. |
| 10 | Hideto Nakane (JPN) | Nippo–Vini Fantini–Faizanè | s.t. |

General classification after Stage 2

| Rank | Rider | Team | Time |
|---|---|---|---|
| 1 | Fernando Gaviria (COL) | UAE Team Emirates | 7h 01' 32" |
| 2 | Julian Alaphilippe (FRA) | Deceuninck–Quick-Step | + 3" |
| 3 | Simone Consonni (ITA) | UAE Team Emirates | + 7" |
| 4 | Peter Sagan (SVK) | Bora–Hansgrohe | + 9" |
| 5 | Alonso Gamero (PER) | Peru | + 12" |
| 6 | Ricardo Escuela (ARG) | A.C. Agrupación Virgen de Fátima | + 13" |
| 7 | Nicolás Tivani (ARG) | A.C. Agrupación Virgen de Fátima | s.t. |
| 8 | Alexandr Grigorev (RUS) | Sporting / Tavira | s.t. |
| 9 | Valerio Conti (ITA) | UAE Team Emirates | s.t. |
| 10 | Laureano Rosas (ARG) | Asociación Civil Mardan | s.t. |

=== Stage 3 ===
Stage 3 result

| Rank | Rider | Team | Time |
|---|---|---|---|
| 1 | Julian Alaphilippe (FRA) | Deceuninck–Quick-Step | 13' 41" |
| 2 | Valerio Conti (ITA) | UAE Team Emirates | + 12" |
| 3 | Remco Evenepoel (BEL) | Deceuninck–Quick-Step | s.t. |
| 4 | Felix Großschartner (AUT) | Bora–Hansgrohe | + 16" |
| 5 | Winner Anacona (COL) | Movistar Team | s.t. |
| 6 | Fernando Gaviria (COL) | UAE Team Emirates | + 21" |
| 7 | Peter Sagan (SVK) | Bora–Hansgrohe | + 26" |
| 8 | Tom Bohli (SUI) | UAE Team Emirates | + 28" |
| 9 | Laureano Rosas (ARG) | Asociación Civil Mardan | + 30" |
| 10 | Óscar Sevilla (ESP) | Medellín | + 31" |

General classification after Stage 3

| Rank | Rider | Team | Time |
|---|---|---|---|
| 1 | Julian Alaphilippe (FRA) | Deceuninck–Quick-Step | 7h 15' 16" |
| 2 | Fernando Gaviria (COL) | UAE Team Emirates | + 18" |
| 3 | Valerio Conti (ITA) | UAE Team Emirates | + 22" |
| 4 | Remco Evenepoel (BEL) | Deceuninck–Quick-Step | s.t. |
| 5 | Felix Großschartner (AUT) | Bora–Hansgrohe | + 26" |
| 6 | Winner Anacona (COL) | Movistar Team | s.t. |
| 7 | Peter Sagan (SVK) | Bora–Hansgrohe | + 32" |
| 8 | Laureano Rosas (ARG) | Asociación Civil Mardan | + 40" |
| 9 | Óscar Sevilla (ESP) | Medellín | + 41" |
| 10 | Simone Consonni (ITA) | UAE Team Emirates | + 44" |

=== Stage 4 ===
Stage 4 result

| Rank | Rider | Team | Time |
|---|---|---|---|
| 1 | Fernando Gaviria (COL) | UAE Team Emirates | 4h 20' 26" |
| 2 | Peter Sagan (SVK) | Bora–Hansgrohe | s.t. |
| 3 | Álvaro Hodeg (COL) | Deceuninck–Quick-Step | s.t. |
| 4 | Simone Consonni (ITA) | UAE Team Emirates | s.t. |
| 5 | Luca Pacioni (ITA) | Neri Sottoli–Selle Italia–KTM | s.t. |
| 6 | Matteo Malucelli (ITA) | Caja Rural–Seguros RGA | s.t. |
| 7 | Nelson Soto (COL) | Caja Rural–Seguros RGA | s.t. |
| 8 | Imerio Cima (ITA) | Nippo–Vini Fantini–Faizanè | s.t. |
| 9 | Nikolas Maes (BEL) | Lotto–Soudal | s.t. |
| 10 | Ricardo Escuela (ARG) | A.C. Agrupación Virgen de Fátima | s.t. |

General classification after Stage 4

| Rank | Rider | Team | Time |
|---|---|---|---|
| 1 | Julian Alaphilippe (FRA) | Deceuninck–Quick-Step | 11h 35' 42" |
| 2 | Fernando Gaviria (COL) | UAE Team Emirates | + 8" |
| 3 | Valerio Conti (ITA) | UAE Team Emirates | + 22" |
| 4 | Remco Evenepoel (BEL) | Deceuninck–Quick-Step | s.t. |
| 5 | Peter Sagan (SVK) | Bora–Hansgrohe | + 26" |
| 6 | Felix Großschartner (AUT) | Bora–Hansgrohe | s.t. |
| 7 | Winner Anacona (COL) | Movistar Team | s.t. |
| 8 | Laureano Rosas (ARG) | Asociación Civil Mardan | + 40" |
| 9 | Óscar Sevilla (ESP) | Medellín | + 41" |
| 10 | Simone Consonni (ITA) | UAE Team Emirates | + 44" |

=== Stage 5 ===
Stage 5 result

| Rank | Rider | Team | Time |
|---|---|---|---|
| 1 | Winner Anacona (COL) | Movistar Team | 4h 25' 10" |
| 2 | Nicolás Paredes (COL) | Medellín | s.t. |
| 3 | Cristhian Montoya (COL) | Medellín | s.t. |
| 4 | Richard Carapaz (ECU) | Movistar Team | + 32" |
| 5 | Óscar Sevilla (ESP) | Medellín | s.t. |
| 6 | Efrén Santos (MEX) | Mexico | + 45" |
| 7 | Alejandro Osorio (COL) | Nippo–Vini Fantini–Faizanè | + 55" |
| 8 | Dayer Quintana (COL) | Neri Sottoli–Selle Italia–KTM | s.t. |
| 9 | Tiesj Benoot (BEL) | Lotto–Soudal | s.t. |
| 10 | Gino Mäder (SUI) | Team Dimension Data | + 57" |

General classification after Stage 5

| Rank | Rider | Team | Time |
|---|---|---|---|
| 1 | Winner Anacona (COL) | Movistar Team | 16h 01' 08" |
| 2 | Julian Alaphilippe (FRA) | Deceuninck–Quick-Step | + 41" |
| 3 | Óscar Sevilla (ESP) | Medellín | + 57" |
| 4 | Valerio Conti (ITA) | UAE Team Emirates | + 1' 03" |
| 5 | Felix Großschartner (AUT) | Bora–Hansgrohe | + 1' 13" |
| 6 | Richard Carapaz (ECU) | Movistar Team | + 1' 20" |
| 7 | Nicolás Paredes (COL) | Medellín | + 1' 24" |
| 8 | Nairo Quintana (COL) | Movistar Team | + 1' 29" |
| 9 | Remco Evenepoel (BEL) | Deceuninck–Quick-Step | + 1' 36" |
| 10 | Tiesj Benoot (BEL) | Lotto–Soudal | + 1' 38" |

=== Stage 6 ===
Stage 6 result

| Rank | Rider | Team | Time |
|---|---|---|---|
| 1 | Nicolás Tivani (ARG) | A.C. Agrupación Virgen de Fátima | 3h 13' 29" |
| 2 | Daniel Díaz (ARG) | Equipo Continental Municipalidad de Pocito | s.t. |
| 3 | Daniel Zamora (ARG) | A.C. Agrupación Virgen de Fátima | s.t. |
| 4 | Sam Bennett (IRL) | Bora–Hansgrohe | + 12" |
| 5 | Fernando Gaviria (COL) | UAE Team Emirates | s.t. |
| 6 | Maximiliano Richeze (ARG) | Deceuninck–Quick-Step | s.t. |
| 7 | Simone Consonni (ITA) | UAE Team Emirates | s.t. |
| 8 | Stan Dewulf (BEL) | Lotto–Soudal | s.t. |
| 9 | Julian Alaphilippe (FRA) | Deceuninck–Quick-Step | s.t. |
| 10 | Rudy Barbier (FRA) | Israel Cycling Academy | + 16" |

General classification after Stage 6

| Rank | Rider | Team | Time |
|---|---|---|---|
| 1 | Winner Anacona (COL) | Movistar Team | 19h 14' 55" |
| 2 | Julian Alaphilippe (FRA) | Deceuninck–Quick-Step | + 35" |
| 3 | Óscar Sevilla (ESP) | Medellín | + 57" |
| 4 | Valerio Conti (ITA) | UAE Team Emirates | + 1' 03" |
| 5 | Felix Großschartner (AUT) | Bora–Hansgrohe | + 1' 13" |
| 6 | Richard Carapaz (ECU) | Movistar Team | + 1' 20" |
| 7 | Nicolás Paredes (COL) | Medellín | + 1' 24" |
| 8 | Nairo Quintana (COL) | Movistar Team | + 1' 29" |
| 9 | Remco Evenepoel (BEL) | Deceuninck–Quick-Step | + 1' 36" |
| 10 | Tiesj Benoot (BEL) | Lotto–Soudal | + 1' 38" |

=== Stage 7 ===
Stage 7 result

| Rank | Rider | Team | Time |
|---|---|---|---|
| 1 | Sam Bennett (IRL) | Bora–Hansgrohe | 2h 54' 26" |
| 2 | Álvaro Hodeg (COL) | Deceuninck–Quick-Step | s.t. |
| 3 | Erik Baška (SVK) | Bora–Hansgrohe | s.t. |
| 4 | Manuel Belletti (ITA) | Androni Giocattoli–Sidermec | s.t. |
| 5 | Peter Sagan (SVK) | Bora–Hansgrohe | s.t. |
| 6 | Rudy Barbier (FRA) | Israel Cycling Academy | s.t. |
| 7 | Imerio Cima (ITA) | Nippo–Vini Fantini–Faizanè | s.t. |
| 8 | Matteo Malucelli (ITA) | Caja Rural–Seguros RGA | s.t. |
| 9 | Ricardo Escuela (ARG) | A.C. Agrupación Virgen de Fátima | s.t. |
| 10 | Fernando Gaviria (COL) | UAE Team Emirates | s.t. |

== Classifications ==
Final general classification

| Rank | Rider | Team | Time |
|---|---|---|---|
| 1 | Winner Anacona (COL) | Movistar Team | 22h 09' 21" |
| 2 | Julian Alaphilippe (FRA) | Deceuninck–Quick-Step | + 35" |
| 3 | Óscar Sevilla (ESP) | Medellín | + 57" |
| 4 | Valerio Conti (ITA) | UAE Team Emirates | + 1' 03" |
| 5 | Felix Großschartner (AUT) | Bora–Hansgrohe | + 1' 13" |
| 6 | Richard Carapaz (ECU) | Movistar Team | + 1' 20" |
| 7 | Nicolás Paredes (COL) | Medellín | + 1' 24" |
| 8 | Nairo Quintana (COL) | Movistar Team | + 1' 29" |
| 9 | Remco Evenepoel (BEL) | Deceuninck–Quick-Step | + 1' 36" |
| 10 | Tiesj Benoot (BEL) | Lotto–Soudal | + 1' 38" |

Final sprint classification

| Rank | Rider | Team | Points |
|---|---|---|---|
| 1 | Maximiliano Navarrete (ARG) | Argentina | 11 |
| 2 | Daniel Zamora (ARG) | A.C. Agrupación Virgen de Fátima | 10 |
| 3 | Gerardo Tivani (ARG) | Equipo Continental Municipalidad de Pocito | 5 |
| 4 | Adrián Richeze (ARG) | A.C. Agrupación Virgen de Fátima | 4 |
| 5 | Nicolás Tivani (ARG) | A.C. Agrupación Virgen de Fátima | 4 |
| 6 | Fabio Duarte (COL) | Medellín | 3 |
| 7 | Royner Navarro (PER) | Peru | 3 |
| 8 | Fernando Gaviria (COL) | UAE Team Emirates | 3 |
| 9 | Hamish Schreurs (NZL) | Israel Cycling Academy | 3 |
| 10 | Facundo Cattapan (ARG) | Municipalidad de Rawson | 3 |

Final mountains classification

| Rank | Rider | Team | Points |
|---|---|---|---|
| 1 | Daniel Zamora (ARG) | A.C. Agrupación Virgen de Fátima | 30 |
| 2 | Nicolás Paredes (COL) | Medellín | 26 |
| 3 | Facundo Cattapan (ARG) | Municipalidad de Rawson | 16 |
| 4 | Royner Navarro (PER) | Peru | 13 |
| 5 | Winner Anacona (COL) | Movistar Team | 10 |
| 6 | Miguel Álvarez (MEX) | Mexico | 9 |
| 7 | Cristhian Montoya Giraldo (COL) | Medellín | 8 |
| 8 | Robert Mendez (URU) | Uruguay | 8 |
| 9 | Higiño Lucero (ARG) | Municipalidad de Rawson | 7 |
| 10 | Hamish Schreurs (NZL) | Israel Cycling Academy | 5 |

Final young rider classification

| Rank | Rider | Team | Time |
|---|---|---|---|
| 1 | Remco Evenepoel (BEL) | Deceuninck–Quick-Step | 22h 10' 57" |
| 2 | Gino Mäder (SUI) | Team Dimension Data | + 2" |
| 3 | Sebastián Castaño (COL) | Beltrami TSA Hopplà Petroli Firenze | + 54" |
| 4 | Alejandro Osorio (COL) | Nippo–Vini Fantini–Faizanè | + 3' 52" |
| 5 | Filippo Conca (ITA) | Biesse–Carrera | + 5' 47" |
| 6 | Luis Villalobos (MEX) | Mexico | + 8' 47" |
| 7 | Stan Dewulf (BEL) | Lotto–Soudal | + 10' 05" |
| 8 | Wilson Estiben Pena Molano (COL) | Beltrami TSA Hopplà Petroli Firenze | + 10' 35" |
| 9 | Ottavio Dotti (ITA) | Beltrami TSA Hopplà Petroli Firenze | + 12' 03" |
| 10 | Imerio Cima (ITA) | Nippo–Vini Fantini–Faizanè | + 14' 09" |

Final teams classification

| Rank | Team | Time |
|---|---|---|
| 1 | Movistar Team | 66h 31' 02" |
| 2 | Medellín | + 1' 01" |
| 3 | A.C. Agrupación Virgen de Fátima | + 3' 35" |
| 4 | Androni Giocattoli–Sidermec | + 4' 46" |
| 5 | Nippo–Vini Fantini–Faizanè | + 6' 30" |
| 6 | Caja Rural–Seguros RGA | + 8' 05" |
| 7 | Equipo Continental Municipalidad de Pocito | + 11' 06" |
| 8 | Team Dimension Data | + 11' 41" |
| 9 | Bora–Hansgrohe | + 14' 11" |
| 10 | Deceuninck–Quick-Step | + 14' 18" |

== Classification leadership table ==
| Stage | Winner | General classification | Mountains classification | Sprints classification | Young rider classification | Teams classification |
|---|---|---|---|---|---|---|
| 1 | Fernando Gaviria | Fernando Gaviria | Daniel Zamora | Maximiliano Navarrete | Alejandro Osorio | Bora–Hansgrohe |
| 2 | Julian Alaphilippe | Fernando Gaviria | Miguel Flórez | Maximiliano Navarrete | Remco Evenepoel | UAE Team Emirates |
| 3 | Julian Alaphilippe | Julian Alaphilippe | Miguel Flórez | Maximiliano Navarrete | Remco Evenepoel | UAE Team Emirates |
| 4 | Fernando Gaviria | Julian Alaphilippe | Daniel Zamora | Maximiliano Navarrete | Remco Evenepoel | UAE Team Emirates |
| 5 | Winner Anacona | Winner Anacona | Daniel Zamora | Maximiliano Navarrete | Remco Evenepoel | Movistar Team |
| 6 | Nicolás Tivani | Winner Anacona | Daniel Zamora | Maximiliano Navarrete | Remco Evenepoel | Movistar Team |
| 7 | Sam Bennett | Winner Anacona | Daniel Zamora | Maximiliano Navarrete | Remco Evenepoel | Movistar Team |
| Final | | Winner Anacona | Daniel Zamora | Maximiliano Navarrete | Remco Evenepoel | Movistar Team |
