= Gabriel Juárez =

Argentinian bicycle racer

Gabriel Verón
Personal information
- Full name: Gabriel Nicolás Juárez Verón
- Born: 7 December 1990 (age 35) La Rioja, Argentina

Cycling career
- Sport: Cycling
- Discipline: Road
- Role: Rider

Amateur teams
- 2016: Equipo Continental Municipalidad de Pocito
- 2018: Municipalidad Valle Fértil

Professional teams
- 2013–2015: San Luis Somos Todos
- 2017: Equipo Continental Municipalidad de Pocito
- 2019: Municipalidad de Rawson
- 2020: Agrupación Virgen de Fátima–SaddleDrunk

Major wins
- One-day races and Classics National Road Race Championships (2013)

Gabriel Nicolás Juárez Verón (born 7 December 1990) is an Argentine road cyclist, who last rode for UCI Continental team Agrupación Virgen de Fátima–SaddleDrunk.

== Major results ==
2011
1st Road race, National Under-23 Road Championships
2012
1st Young rider classification, Tour de San Luis
5th Road race, National Road Championships
2013
1st Road race, National Road Championships
1st Stage 3 (TTT) Vuelta a Bolivia
2014
3rd Road race, National Road Championships
