= Argentine National Road Race Championships =

National road cycling championship in Argentina

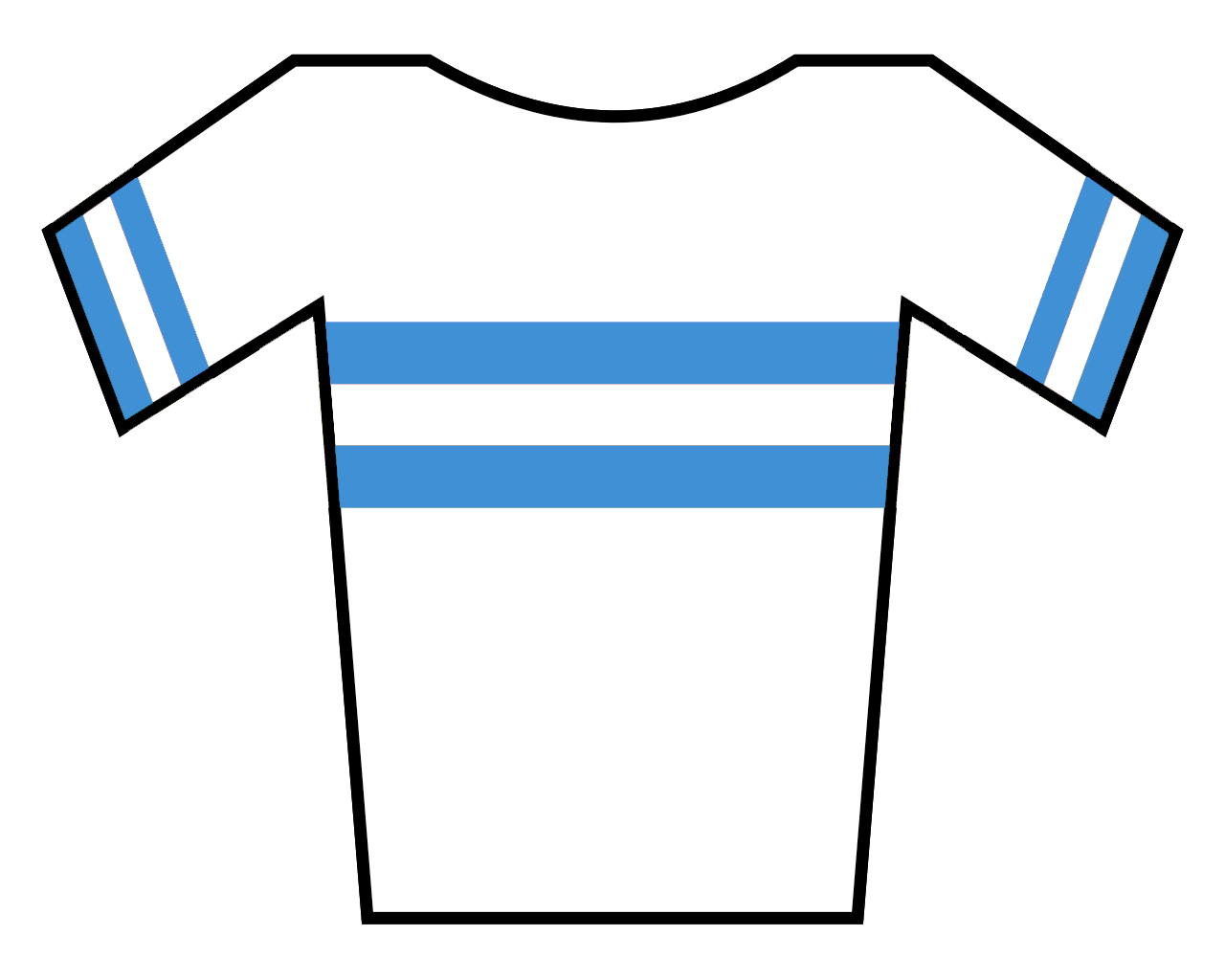
The champion's jersey

The Argentine National Road Race Championships is a cycling race where the Argentine cyclists compete to decide who will become champion for the year to come.

== Men ==
=== Elite ===
Year	Gold	Silver	Bronze
1912	Manuel Fernández		
1913	Manuel Fernández		
1914	Manuel Fernández		
1915	Eugenio Delage		
1916	José Guzzo		
1917	Antonio de Loma		
1918	Antonio de Loma		
1919	Antonio de Loma		
1920	Antonio Secchi		
1921	José Guzzo		
1922	José Zampichiatti		
1923	José Zampichiatti		
1924	Antonio de Loma	Julio Polet	Guido Brovarone
1925	Luis Meyer	Cosme Saavedra	Darromedis
1926	Cosme Saavedra	V. Cozzolino	Eugenio Verduna
1927	Luis Meyer	Antonio de Loma	Carmelo Saavedra
1928	Francisco Bonvehi	V. Cozzolino	R. Zanelli
1929	Francisco Rodríguez		
1930	Francisco Rodríguez		
1931	Cosme Saavedra	Remigio Saavedra	Fernando Scaglia
1932	Fernando Scaglia	Francisco Rodríguez	Luis M. Sánchez
1933	Cosme Saavedra	Remigio Saavedra	
1934	Alfredo Maturana		
1935	Mario Mathieu		
1936	Manuel Abregú	Alfredo Tafetoni	Aníbal López
1937	Mario Mathieu	Manuel Abregú	Tomás Suárez
1938	Mario Mathieu		
1939	Enrique Molina		
1940	José Cechet		
1941	Antonio Bertola		
1942	Mario Mathieu		
1943	Antonio Bertola	Luciano Montero	Julio Alba
1944	Julio Alba	Humberto Palmieri	
1945	Julio Alba		
1946	Julio Alba		
1947	Julio Alba	Mario Mathieu	Amilcar Arregui
1948	Ceferino Peroné		
1949	Pedro Salas	Miguel Sevillano	Humberto Varisco
1950	Miguel Sevillano		
1951	Saúl Crispín	Ambrosio Aimar	Dante Benvenuti
1952	Pedro Salas	Ambrosio Aimar	Dante Benvenuti
1953	Oscar Pezoa		
1954	Alberto Ferreyra		
1955	Duilio Biganzoli		
1956	Duilio Biganzoli		
1957	Héctor Acosta		
1958	Pedro Salas		
1959	Ernesto Contreras		
1960	Santos Liendo		
1961	Ricardo Santo Senn		
1962	José Fernández		
1963	Duilio Biganzoli		
1964	Ricardo Santo Senn		
1965	Ricardo Santo Senn		
1966	Carlos Álvarez		
1967	Ismael Morán		
1968	Antonio Dalleve		
1969	Carlos Escudero		
1970	Ernesto Contreras		
1971	Ernesto Contreras		
1972	Raúl Labbate		
1973	Marcelo Chancay		
1974	Moisés Carrizo		
1975	Oswaldo Frossasco		
1976	Osvaldo Benvenutti		
1977	Oswaldo Frossasco		
1978	Moisés Carrizo		
1979	Oswaldo Frossasco		
1980	Oswaldo Frossasco		
1981	Pedro Omar Caino		
1982	Juan C. Haedo		
1983	Eduardo Trillini		
1984	Jorge Galíndez		
1985	Gabriel Curuchet		
1986	Pablo Costa		
1987	Jorge Sebastía		
1988	Luis Moyano		
1989	Alejandro Beldorati		
1990	Claudio Iannone		
1991	Carlos Pérez		
1992	Fabio Placánica		
1993	Ángel Serrano		
1994	Hugo Pratissoli		
1995	Héctor Palavecino		
1996	Rubén Pegorín		
1997	Jorge Giacinti	Matías Médici	
1998	Fabián Tapia		
1999	Jorge Giacinti		
2000	Gabriel Curuchet	Adrian Gariboldi	Andrés Palavecino
2001	Guillermo Brunetta	Edgardo Simón	Gastón Corsaro
2002	Luis Moyano	Daniel Capella	Juan Alves
2003	Javier Gómez	Oswaldo Frossasco	Juan Aguirre
2004	Ángel Darío Colla	Mario Giménez	Pedro Prieto
2005	Gustavo Toledo	Aníbal Borrajo	César Sigura
2006	Armando Borrajo	César Sigura	Gastón Corsaro
2007	Raúl Turano	Alejandro Borrajo	Gerardo Fernández
2008	Gerardo Fernández	Claudio Flores	Edgardo Simón
2009	Facundo Bazzi	Ricardo Escuela	Not awarded
2010	Jorge Pi	Leandro Messineo	Pedro González
2011	Emanuel Saldaño	Luciano Montivero	Juan Manuel Aguirre
2012	Juan Pablo Dotti	Darío Díaz	Ricardo Escuela
2013	Gabriel Juárez	Franco Lopardo	Juan Melivilo
2014	Daniel Díaz	Jorge Giacinti	Gabriel Juárez
2015	Daniel Juárez	Lionel Biondo	Maximiliano Navarrete
2016	Mauro Abel Richeze	Adrián Richeze	Julián Gaday
2017	Gonzalo Najar	Gabriel Richard	Juan Melivilo
2018	Rubén Ramos	Jorge Giacinti	Lucas Gaday
2019	Maximiliano Richeze	Nicolás Naranjo	Hector Lucero
2021	Pablo Brun	Sergio Fredes	Nicolás Naranjo
2022	Emiliano Contreras	Lucas Gaday	Nicolás Tivani
2023	Alejandro Durán; Sergio Fredes	Juan Pablo Dotti	Leonardo Cobarrubia
2024	Daniel Omar Juárez	Leandro Velardez	Diego Valenzuela
2025	Leonardo Cobarrubia	Nicolás Tivani	Omar Salim Azzem
2026	Nicolás Tivani	Mauricio Domínguez	Daniel Juárez (cyclist)

=== U23 ===
Year	Gold	Silver	Bronze
2000	Juan Pablo Raffler		
2001	Javier Páez	Facundo Bazzi	Alejandro Corvalán
2002	Mauricio Pérez	Alejandro Borrajo	Juan Gáspari
2003	Darío Díaz	Mario Giménez	Emilio Ibarra
2004	Diego Valenzuela	Jorge Trinajstic	Jorge Martín Montenegro
2005	Jorge Martín Montenegro	Maximiliano Richeze	Luis Jácamo
2006	Javier Salas		
2007	Luis Jácamo	Federico Pagani	Diego Portal
2008	Gustavo Borcard	Carlos Corti	Demis Alemán
2009	Román Mastrángelo	Daniel Zamora	Ignacio Pérez
2010	Agustín Fraysse	José Astiasarán	Gerardo Tivani
2011	Gabriel Juárez	Nicolás Naranjo	Alejandro Durán
2013	Cristian Martínez	Rodrigo Durán	Gonzalo Najar
2014	Gastón Javier	Lucas Gaday	Facundo Lezica
2015	Emiliano Contreras	Ismael Laguna	Giuliano Mini
2016	Juan Esteban Molina	Federico Vivas	Fernando Joel Torres
2017	Nicolás Tivani	Marco Méndez	Leonardo Cobarrubia
2018	Duilio Ramos	Jairo Ríos	Leonardo Rodríguez
2025	Enzo Tallarico	[[]]	[[]]
2026	Ramiro Videla	Sebastían Coronel	Nehuen Erripa

=== Junior ===
Year	Gold	Silver	Bronze
2003	Germán Calliva	Rogelio Anías	José Loyzaga
2004	Demis Alemán	Daniel Zamora	Marcos Santucho
2005	Alejandro Jairo	Juan José Rivero	Ignacio Pereyra
2007	Leonardo Paz	Elías Pereyra	Adrián Richeze
2008	Alan Ramírez	Cristian Martínez	Laureano Rosas
2010	Diego Tivani	Leandro Atencio	Nicolás Herrera
2011	Ángel Gabriel Britos	Emiliano Contreras	Julián Barrientos
2012	Nicolás Tivani	Julián Barrientos	Santiago Espíndola
2013	Isaias Abu	Franco Luna	Joel Krig
2014	Matías Fernández	Joaquín García	Julio Fernando Gil
2015	Juan Esteban Molina	Nahuel D'Aquila	Leonardo Franco Rodríguez
2016	Eduardo Luján	Tomás Contte	Gonzalo Robledo
2017	Agustín del Negro	Lucas Vilar	Andrés Fernández
2018	Ángel Echegaray	Santiago Sanchez	Yoel Vargas

== Women ==
=== Elite ===
Year	Gold	Silver	Bronze
2004	Jessica Compiano	Valeria Pintos	Noelia Fernández
2005	Paola Toane	Ana Ortega	Valeria Müller
2006	Valeria Pintos	Cristina Irma Greve	Claudia Ferreyra
2007	Jessica Compiano	Valeria Pintos	Ivana Kunze
2008	Daiana Almada	Valeria Müller	Alejandra Alliegro
2009	Maria Clara Alvarez	Tania Castro	Marcela Zarate
2010	Marcela Zarate	Graciela Zarate	Tania Castro
2011	Estefanía Pilz	Alejandra Alliegro	Vanesa Solera
2012	Graciela Zarate	Dolores Rodriguez	Paola Toane
2013	Mariela Delgado	Julia Sánchez Parma	Cindi Magali Dinatale
2014	Valeria Müller	Andrea Arias	Julia Sánchez Parma
2015	Julia Sánchez Parma	Cristina Irma Greve	Maria Prezioso
2016	Maria Clara Alvarez	Dolores Rodriguez	Graciela Zarate
2017	Dolores Rodriguez	Mariela Delgado	Maribel Aguirre
2018	Maribel Aguirre	Xoana Acosta	Mercedes Fadiga
2019	Carolina Perez	Maria Roca	Valeria Müller
2021	Mercedes Fadiga	Maribel Aguirre	Sofia Martelli
2022	Maribel Aguirre (2)	Sofía Martelli	Anabel Ruiz
2023	Micaela Gutiérrez	Julieta Benedetti	Sofia Martelli
2024	Mercedes Fadiga (2)	Eliana Tocha	Aracelli Bureaux
2025	Jennifer Francone	Sofia Martelli	Maribel Aguirre
2026	Abril Garzón	Ludmila Aguirre	Maria Prezioso

== See also ==
- Argentine National Time Trial Championships
- National Road Cycling Championships
