= Héctor Lucero =

Argentine cyclist

Personal information
- Full name: Héctor Maximiliano Lucero
- Born: 10 January 1982 (age 44) Chimbas, Argentina

Cycling career
- Sport: Cycling
- Discipline: Road
- Role: Rider

Amateur teams
- 2007: Vergel–Municipalidad de Chimbas
- 2010–2012: Agrupación Virgen de Fátima
- 2011: Sindicato de Empleados Públicos
- 2012: Municipalidad de Godoy Cruz
- 2013: Ciudad de Bolívar
- 2014: Agrupación Virgen de Fátima
- 2014–2015: Asociación Civil Mardan
- 2015–2016: Stylo Bike San Juan

Professional teams
- 2017–2019: Equipo Continental Municipalidad de Pocito
- 2020: Sindicato de Empleados Publicos de San Juan

Héctor Maximiliano Lucero (born 10 January 1982) is an Argentine professional racing cyclist, who most recently rode for UCI Continental team Sindicato de Empleados Publicos de San Juan.

== Major results ==
2008
1st Mendoza–San Juan
2010
1st Stage 2 Giro del Sol San Juan
2011
1st Stage 5 Vuelta a San Juan
1st Stage 5 Giro del Sol San Juan
2012
1st Doble Media Agua
1st Stage 2 Vuelta a San Juan
2015
1st Stages 5 & 8 Doble Bragado
1st Stage 9 Vuelta a San Juan
2016
1st Stage 1 Giro del Sol San Juan
2017
Vuelta del Uruguay

1st Points classification
1st Stages 5, 8 & 9

2018
1st Stages 4 & 10 Vuelta del Uruguay
1st Stages 2 & 8 Doble Bragado
1st Stage 3 Giro del Sol San Juan
2019
1st Stage 4 Vuelta a Mendoza
1st Stage 2 Giro del Sol San Juan
3rd Road race, National Road Championships
