= Nicolás Tivani =

Argentine cyclist (born 1995)

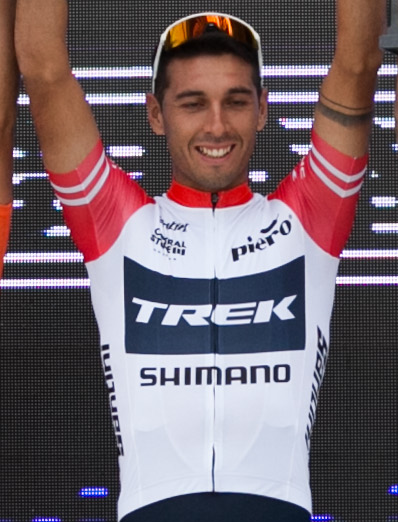
- Tivani in 2022

Personal information
- Full name: Germán Nicolás Tivani Pérez
- Born: 31 October 1995 (age 30) Pocito Department, Argentina
- Height: 1.76 m (5 ft 9 in)
- Weight: 67 kg (148 lb)

Cycling career
- Sport: Cycling
- Current team: Aviludo–Louletano–Loulé
- Discipline: Road
- Role: Rider

Amateur team
- 2021: Agrupación Virgen de Fátima

Professional teams
- 2017–2018: Unieuro Trevigiani–Hemus 1896
- 2018: UAE Team Emirates (stagiaire)
- 2019–2020: A.C. Agrupación Virgen de Fátima
- 2022: A.C. Agrupación Virgen de Fátima
- 2023: Team Corratec–Selle Italia
- 2024–: Aviludo–Louletano–Loulé Concelho
Medal record
Men's road bicycle racing
Representing Argentina
Pan American Championships
Silver medal – second place	2023 Panama City	Road race

Germán Nicolás Tivani Pérez (born 31 October 1995) is an Argentine cyclist, who currently rides for UCI Continental team Aviludo–Louletano–Loulé.

For the 2021 season, Tivani had been scheduled to join the Louletano–Loulé Concelho team, but ultimately remained with the Agrupación Virgen de Fátima team, which had dropped down from UCI Continental team level.

== Major results ==
2012
1st Road race, National Junior Road Championships
2013
6th Overall Ronde des Vallées
9th Overall Grand Prix Rüebliland
2015
National Under-23 Road Championships

3rd Time trial
4th Road race

9th Road race, Pan American Under-23 Road Championships
2016 (1 pro win)
1st Stage 5 Tour de San Luis
1st Stage 10 Tour du Maroc
9th Road race, Pan American Under-23 Road Championships
2017
National Under-23 Road Championships

1st Road race
1st Time trial

1st Ruota d'Oro
Pan American Under-23 Road Championships

2nd Road race
3rd Time trial

4th Overall Tour of Bulgaria – North

1st Young rider classification
1st Stage 2b

4th Trofeo Edil C
6th Trofeo Alcide Degasperi
8th Overall Tour of Bulgaria – South

1st Young rider classification

10th Memorial Marco Pantani
2018
1st Overall Tour de Serbie

1st Stage 1

3rd Overall Tour of Mersin

1st Points classification

3rd Overall Belgrade–Banja Luka
3rd GP Kranj
6th GP Izola
8th GP Adria Mobil
10th GP Industria & Artigianato di Larciano
2019 (1)
1st Stage 6 Vuelta a San Juan
3rd Overall Vuelta del Uruguay

1st Stages 2 & 9

2020
1st Overall Clasica Doble Media Agua
1st Circuito Carlos Escudero
2021
1st Overall Clasica Doble Media Agua
1st Overall Giro del Sol San Juan
1st Overall Vueta al Oeste-Chilecito

1st Stages 1, 2 & 3

1st Overall Vuelta Cutral Co

1st Stage 1

1st Overall Clásica Doble Media Agua II
1st Homenaje al Ciclista
1st Circuito Esperanza
1st Circuito Aniversario la Bebida
1st Doble Cerrillo
1st Circuito Albardón
1st GP Aserradero Bucci-Los Cerrillos
1st Stage 5 Vuelta al Valle
1st Stages 1 & 2 Doble Chepes
1st Stage 1 Doble Calingasta
2022
1st Overall Vuelta del Porvenir San Luis

1st Stages 2 & 4

1st Overall Vuelta a Formosa Internacional

1st Points classification
1st Sprints classification
1st Stages 2b & 4

1st 4 Puentes-San Juan
1st Mendoza-San Juan
1st Stage 8 Vuelta de Mendoza
1st Stage 5 Vueta al Oeste-Chilecito
2nd Overall Giro del Sol San Juan

1st Stage 3

2023
1st Cupa Max Ausnit
2nd Road race, Pan American Road Championships
2nd Giro della Città Metropolitana di Reggio Calabria
2024 (1)
Volta a Portugal

1st Points classification
1st Stage 2

1st Stage 3 Grande Prémio Abimota
10th Overall Troféu Joaquim Agostinho
2025
1st Mountains classification, Volta ao Algarve
