= Nicolás Naranjo =

Argentinian bicycle racer (1990–2021)

Personal information
- Full name: Nicolás Javier Naranjo Sánchez
- Born: 10 July 1990 San Juan, Argentina
- Died: 12 September 2021 (aged 31) Mendoza, Argentina

Cycling career
- Sport: Cycling
- Discipline: Road
- Role: Rider
- Rider type: Sprinter

Amateur teams
- 2011–2012: Palmar del Lago
- 2013–2014: Municipalidad de Rawson
- 2014: Agrupación Virgen de Fátima
- 2015: Municipalidad de Guaymallén
- 2015–2016: A.C. Agrupación Virgen de Fátima

Professional team
- 2017–2021: A.C. Agrupación Virgen de Fátima

Nicolás Javier Naranjo Sánchez (10 July 1990 – 12 September 2021) was an Argentine road cyclist, who rode for UCI Continental team Agrupación Virgen de Fátima–San Juan Biker Motos.

== Major results ==
2011
2nd Road race, National Under-23 Road Championships
2014
1st Prologue & Stages 1 & 2 Vuelta a San Juan
2015
1st Stage 6 Vuelta a Mendoza
2016
1st Prologue Vuelta a San Juan
2nd Overall Giro del Sol San Juan
2017
1st Doble Difunta Correa
3rd Overall Doble Bragado

1st Stages 1, 2, 4 & 7b

6th Overall Vuelta del Uruguay

1st Stage 7

2018
1st Overall Giro del Sol San Juan

1st Prologue & Stages 4 (ITT) & 5

1st Stage 2 Doble Calingasta
2019
1st Overall Giro del Sol San Juan

1st Stages 1 & 4

2nd Road race, National Road Championships
4th Overall Vuelta del Uruguay

1st Points classification
1st Stages 1, 3, 4, 5 & 10

2020
1st Overall Giro del Sol San Juan

1st Stage 3

== Death ==
He died from head injuries sustained in a crash while competing in a track and criterium event in Mendoza.

== See also ==
- List of racing cyclists and pacemakers with a cycling-related death
