= 2025 Volta ao Algarve =

Portuguese cycling race

2025 UCI ProSeries

Race details
- Dates: 19–23 February 2025
- Stages: 5
- Distance: 748.1 km (464.8 mi)
- Winning time: 13h 19' 30"

Results
| Jersey awarded to the overall winner | Winner | Jonas Vingegaard (DEN) | (Visma–Lease a Bike) |
| | Second | João Almeida (POR) | (UAE Team Emirates XRG) |
| | Third | Laurens De Plus (BEL) | (Ineos Grenadiers) |
| Jersey awarded to the points classification winner | Points | Jordi Meeus (BEL) | (Red Bull–Bora–Hansgrohe) |
| Jersey awarded to the mountains classification winner | Mountains | Nicolás Tivani (ARG) | (Aviludo–Louletano–Loulé) |
| Jersey awarded to the youth classification winner | Youth | Romain Grégoire (FRA) | (Groupama–FDJ) |
| | Team | (United Arab Emirates) UAE Team Emirates XRG | |

The 2025 Volta ao Algarve (English: Tour of the Algarve) was a road cycling stage race that took between 19 and 23 February 2025 in the Algarve region of southern Portugal. The race was rated as a category 2.Pro event on the 2025 UCI ProSeries calendar, and was the 51st edition of the Volta ao Algarve.

== Teams ==
13 of the 18 UCI WorldTeams, three UCI ProTeams, and nine UCI Continental teams made up the 25 teams that participated in the race.

UCI WorldTeams

- Alpecin–Deceuninck
- Cofidis
- EF Education–EasyPost
- Groupama–FDJ
- Ineos Grenadiers
- Intermarché–Wanty
- Lidl–Trek
- Red Bull–Bora–Hansgrohe
- Soudal–Quick-Step
- Team Bahrain Victorious
- Team Picnic PostNL
- UAE Team Emirates XRG
- Visma–Lease a Bike

UCI ProTeams

- Caja Rural–Seguros RGA
- Lotto
- Tudor Pro Cycling Team

UCI Continental Teams

- Anicolor / Tien 21
- AP Hotels & Resorts / Tavira / SC Farense
- Aviludo–Louletano–Loulé
- Credibom / LA Alumínios / Marcos Car
- Efapel Cycling
- FEIRENSE–BEECELER
- GI Group Holding–Simoldes–UDO
- Rádio Popular–Paredes–Boavista
- Tavfer–Ovos Matinados–Mortágua

== Route ==
Stage characteristics and winners
| Stage | Date | Course | Distance | Type | Stage winner |
|---|---|---|---|---|---|
| 1 | 19 February | Portimão to Lagos | 192.2 km (119.4 mi) | Flat stage | No winner (Note: No winner was announced after stage 1 due to a misdirection of the peloton in the final kilometer.) |
| 2 | 20 February | Lagoa to Alto da Fóia | 177.6 km (110.4 mi) | Mountain stage | Jan Christen (SUI) |
| 3 | 21 February | Vila Real de Santo António to Tavira | 183.5 km (114.0 mi) | Flat stage | Jordi Meeus (BEL) |
| 4 | 22 February | Albufeira to Faro | 175.2 km (108.9 mi) | Flat stage | Milan Fretin (BEL) |
| 5 | 23 February | Salir to Alto do Malhão | 19.6 km (12.2 mi) | Individual time trial | Jonas Vingegaard (DEN) |
| Total | | | 748.1 km (464.8 mi) | | |

== Stages ==
=== Stage 1 ===
19 February 2025 – Portimão to Lagos, 192.2 km (119.4 mi)

No winner was announced after stage 1 due to a misdirection of the peloton in the final kilometer.

=== Stage 2 ===
20 February 2025 – Lagoa to Alto da Fóia, 177.6 km (110.4 mi)

Stage 2 Result
| Rank | Rider | Team | Time |
|---|---|---|---|
| 1 | Jan Christen (SUI) | UAE Team Emirates XRG | 4h 28' 44" |
| 2 | João Almeida (POR) | UAE Team Emirates XRG | + 0" |
| 3 | Laurens De Plus (BEL) | Ineos Grenadiers | + 7" |
| 4 | Romain Bardet (FRA) | Team Picnic PostNL | + 8" |
| 5 | António Morgado (POR) | UAE Team Emirates XRG | + 10" |
| 6 | Jonas Vingegaard (DEN) | Visma–Lease a Bike | + 10" |
| 7 | Luca Vergallito (ITA) | Alpecin–Deceuninck | + 10" |
| 8 | Tao Geoghegan Hart (GBR) | Lidl–Trek | + 13" |
| 9 | Primož Roglič (SLO) | Red Bull–Bora–Hansgrohe | + 13" |
| 10 | Neilson Powless (USA) | EF Education–EasyPost | + 16" |

General classification after Stage 2
| Rank | Rider | Team | Time |
|---|---|---|---|
| 1 | Jan Christen (SUI) | UAE Team Emirates XRG | 4h 28' 34" |
| 2 | João Almeida (POR) | UAE Team Emirates XRG | + 4" |
| 3 | Laurens De Plus (BEL) | Ineos Grenadiers | + 13" |
| 4 | Romain Bardet (FRA) | Team Picnic PostNL | + 18" |
| 5 | António Morgado (POR) | UAE Team Emirates XRG | + 20" |
| 6 | Jonas Vingegaard (DEN) | Visma–Lease a Bike | + 20" |
| 7 | Luca Vergallito (ITA) | Alpecin–Deceuninck | + 20" |
| 8 | Tao Geoghegan Hart (GBR) | Lidl–Trek | + 23" |
| 9 | Primož Roglič (SLO) | Red Bull–Bora–Hansgrohe | + 23" |
| 10 | Neilson Powless (USA) | EF Education–EasyPost | + 26" |

=== Stage 3 ===
21 February 2025 – Vila Real de Santo António to Tavira, 183.5 km (114.0 mi)

Stage 3 Result
| Rank | Rider | Team | Time |
|---|---|---|---|
| 1 | Jordi Meeus (BEL) | Red Bull–Bora–Hansgrohe | 4h 18' 34" |
| 2 | Biniam Girmay (ERI) | Intermarché–Wanty | + 0" |
| 3 | Arnaud De Lie (BEL) | Lotto | + 0" |
| 4 | Casper van Uden (NED) | Team Picnic PostNL | + 0" |
| 5 | Milan Fretin (BEL) | Cofidis | + 0" |
| 6 | Madis Mihkels (EST) | EF Education–EasyPost | + 0" |
| 7 | Wout van Aert (BEL) | Visma–Lease a Bike | + 0" |
| 8 | Santiago Mesa (COL) | Efapel Cycling | + 0" |
| 9 | Samuel Watson (GBR) | Ineos Grenadiers | + 0" |
| 10 | Johan Jacobs (SUI) | Groupama–FDJ | + 0" |

General classification after Stage 3
| Rank | Rider | Team | Time |
|---|---|---|---|
| 1 | Jan Christen (SUI) | UAE Team Emirates XRG | 8h 47' 08" |
| 2 | João Almeida (POR) | UAE Team Emirates XRG | + 4" |
| 3 | Laurens De Plus (BEL) | Ineos Grenadiers | + 13" |
| 4 | António Morgado (POR) | UAE Team Emirates XRG | + 20" |
| 5 | Jonas Vingegaard (DEN) | Visma–Lease a Bike | + 20" |
| 6 | Luca Vergallito (ITA) | Alpecin–Deceuninck | + 20" |
| 7 | Primož Roglič (SLO) | Red Bull–Bora–Hansgrohe | + 23" |
| 8 | Tao Geoghegan Hart (GBR) | Lidl–Trek | + 23" |
| 9 | Romain Grégoire (FRA) | Groupama–FDJ | + 26" |
| 10 | Neilson Powless (USA) | EF Education–EasyPost | + 26" |

=== Stage 4 ===
22 February 2025 – Albufeira to Faro, 175.2 km (108.9 mi)

Stage 4 Result
| Rank | Rider | Team | Time |
|---|---|---|---|
| 1 | Milan Fretin (BEL) | Cofidis | 4h 03' 31" |
| 2 | Jordi Meeus (BEL) | Red Bull–Bora–Hansgrohe | + 0" |
| 3 | Filippo Ganna (ITA) | Ineos Grenadiers | + 0" |
| 4 | Arnaud De Lie (BEL) | Lotto | + 0" |
| 5 | Biniam Girmay (ERI) | Intermarché–Wanty | + 0" |
| 6 | Madis Mihkels (EST) | EF Education–EasyPost | + 0" |
| 7 | Wout van Aert (BEL) | Visma–Lease a Bike | + 0" |
| 8 | Nicolò Buratti (ITA) | Team Bahrain Victorious | + 0" |
| 9 | Casper van Uden (NED) | Team Picnic PostNL | + 0" |
| 10 | Jasper Stuyven (BEL) | Lidl–Trek | + 0" |

General classification after Stage 4
| Rank | Rider | Team | Time |
|---|---|---|---|
| 1 | Jan Christen (SUI) | UAE Team Emirates XRG | 12h 50' 45" |
| 2 | João Almeida (POR) | UAE Team Emirates XRG | + 4" |
| 3 | Laurens De Plus (BEL) | Ineos Grenadiers | + 7" |
| 4 | António Morgado (POR) | UAE Team Emirates XRG | + 14" |
| 5 | Luca Vergallito (ITA) | Alpecin–Deceuninck | + 20" |
| 6 | Jonas Vingegaard (DEN) | Visma–Lease a Bike | + 20" |
| 7 | Primož Roglič (SLO) | Red Bull–Bora–Hansgrohe | + 23" |
| 8 | Tao Geoghegan Hart (GBR) | Lidl–Trek | + 23" |
| 9 | Quinten Hermans (BEL) | Alpecin–Deceuninck | + 23" |
| 10 | Romain Grégoire (FRA) | Groupama–FDJ | + 26" |

=== Stage 5 ===
23 February 2025 – Salir to Alto do Malhão, 19.6 km (12.2 mi) (ITT)

Stage 5 Result
| Rank | Rider | Team | Time |
|---|---|---|---|
| 1 | Jonas Vingegaard (DEN) | Visma–Lease a Bike | 28' 25" |
| 2 | Wout van Aert (BEL) | Visma–Lease a Bike | + 11" |
| 3 | Antonio Tiberi (ITA) | Team Bahrain Victorious | + 15" |
| 4 | Romain Grégoire (FRA) | Groupama–FDJ | + 30" |
| 5 | Maximilian Schachmann (GER) | Soudal–Quick-Step | + 31" |
| 6 | João Almeida (POR) | UAE Team Emirates XRG | + 31" |
| 7 | Neilson Powless (USA) | EF Education–EasyPost | + 37" |
| 8 | Laurens De Plus (BEL) | Ineos Grenadiers | + 37" |
| 9 | Ilan Van Wilder (BEL) | Soudal–Quick-Step | + 39" |
| 10 | Jakob Söderqvist (SWE) | Lidl–Trek | + 39" |

General classification after Stage 5
| Rank | Rider | Team | Time |
|---|---|---|---|
| 1 | Jonas Vingegaard (DEN) | Visma–Lease a Bike | 13h 19' 30" |
| 2 | João Almeida (POR) | UAE Team Emirates XRG | + 15" |
| 3 | Laurens De Plus (BEL) | Ineos Grenadiers | + 24" |
| 4 | Romain Grégoire (FRA) | Groupama–FDJ | + 36" |
| 5 | Maximilian Schachmann (GER) | Soudal–Quick-Step | + 40" |
| 6 | Neilson Powless (USA) | EF Education–EasyPost | + 43" |
| 7 | Ilan Van Wilder (BEL) | Soudal–Quick-Step | + 48" |
| 8 | Primož Roglič (SLO) | Red Bull–Bora–Hansgrohe | + 53" |
| 9 | Tao Geoghegan Hart (GBR) | Lidl–Trek | + 54" |
| 10 | Jan Christen (SUI) | UAE Team Emirates XRG | + 57" |

== Classification leadership table ==
Classification leadership by stage
| Stage | Winner | General classification | Points classification | Mountains classification | Young rider classification | Team classification |
|---|---|---|---|---|---|---|
| 1 | No winner | | | | | |
| 2 | Jan Christen | Jan Christen | Jan Christen | Jan Christen | Jan Christen | UAE Team Emirates XRG |
| 3 | Jordi Meeus | Jan Christen | Jordi Meeus | Nicolás Tivani | Jan Christen | UAE Team Emirates XRG |
| 4 | Milan Fretin | Jan Christen | Jordi Meeus | Nicolás Tivani | Jan Christen | UAE Team Emirates XRG |
| 5 | Jonas Vingegaard | Jonas Vingegaard | Jordi Meeus | Nicolás Tivani | Romain Grégoire | UAE Team Emirates XRG |
| Final | | Jonas Vingegaard | Jordi Meeus | Nicolás Tivani | Romain Grégoire | UAE Team Emirates XRG |

== Final classification standings ==
Legend
| Denotes the winner of the general classification | Denotes the winner of the mountains classification |
| Denotes the winner of the points classification | Denotes the winner of the young rider classification |

=== General classification ===
Final general classification (1–10)
| Rank | Rider | Team | Time |
|---|---|---|---|
| 1 | Jonas Vingegaard (DEN) | Visma–Lease a Bike | 13h 19' 30" |
| 2 | João Almeida (POR) | UAE Team Emirates XRG | + 15" |
| 3 | Laurens De Plus (BEL) | Ineos Grenadiers | + 24" |
| 4 | Romain Grégoire (FRA) | Groupama–FDJ | + 36" |
| 5 | Maximilian Schachmann (GER) | Soudal–Quick-Step | + 40" |
| 6 | Neilson Powless (USA) | EF Education–EasyPost | + 43" |
| 7 | Ilan Van Wilder (BEL) | Soudal–Quick-Step | + 48" |
| 8 | Primož Roglič (SLO) | Red Bull–Bora–Hansgrohe | + 53" |
| 9 | Tao Geoghegan Hart (GBR) | Lidl–Trek | + 54" |
| 10 | Jan Christen (SUI) | UAE Team Emirates XRG | + 57" |

=== Points classification ===
Final points classification (1–10)
| Rank | Rider | Team | Time |
|---|---|---|---|
| 1 | Jordi Meeus (BEL) | Red Bull–Bora–Hansgrohe | 45 |
| 2 | Milan Fretin (BEL) | Cofidis | 35 |
| 3 | Wout van Aert (BEL) | Visma–Lease a Bike | 24 |
| 4 | Filippo Ganna (ITA) | Ineos Grenadiers | 20 |
| 5 | Jonas Vingegaard (DEN) | Visma–Lease a Bike | 20 |
| 6 | João Almeida (POR) | UAE Team Emirates XRG | 17 |
| 7 | Madis Mihkels (EST) | EF Education–EasyPost | 16 |
| 8 | Jan Christen (SUI) | UAE Team Emirates XRG | 15 |
| 9 | Casper van Uden (NED) | Team Picnic PostNL | 15 |
| 10 | Laurens De Plus (BEL) | Ineos Grenadiers | 13 |

=== Mountains classification ===
Final mountains classification (1–10)
| Rank | Rider | Team | Time |
|---|---|---|---|
| 1 | Nicolás Tivani (ARG) | Aviludo–Louletano–Loulé | 28 |
| 2 | João Almeida (POR) | UAE Team Emirates XRG | 14 |
| 3 | Johan Jacobs (SUI) | Groupama–FDJ | 13 |
| 4 | Jan Christen (SUI) | UAE Team Emirates XRG | 12 |
| 5 | Brent Van Moer (BEL) | Lotto | 9 |
| 6 | Warre Vangheluwe (BEL) | Soudal–Quick-Step | 9 |
| 7 | Laurens De Plus (BEL) | Ineos Grenadiers | 6 |
| 8 | Tobias Bayer (AUT) | Alpecin–Deceuninck | 6 |
| 9 | Primož Roglič (SLO) | Red Bull–Bora–Hansgrohe | 4 |
| 10 | Calum Johnston (GBR) | Caja Rural–Seguros RGA | 4 |

=== Young rider classification ===
Final young rider classification (1–10)
| Rank | Rider | Team | Time |
|---|---|---|---|
| 1 | Romain Grégoire (FRA) | Groupama–FDJ | 13h 20' 06" |
| 2 | Jan Christen (SUI) | UAE Team Emirates XRG | + 21" |
| 3 | António Morgado (POR) | UAE Team Emirates XRG | + 39" |
| 4 | Max Poole (GBR) | Team Picnic PostNL | + 51" |
| 5 | Brieuc Rolland (FRA) | Groupama–FDJ | + 8' 26" |
| 6 | Lucas Lopes (POR) | Rádio Popular–Paredes–Boavista | + 11' 04" |
| 7 | Jakob Söderqvist (SWE) | Lidl–Trek | + 16' 31" |
| 8 | Madis Mihkels (EST) | EF Education–EasyPost | + 18' 34" |
| 9 | Duarte Domingues (POR) | Credibom / LA Alumínios / Marcos Car | + 19' 45" |
| 10 | Bryan Olivo (ITA) | Team Bahrain Victorious | + 21' 21" |

=== Teams classification ===
Final team classification (1–10)
| Rank | Team | Time |
|---|---|---|
| 1 | (United Arab Emirates) UAE Team Emirates XRG | 40h 01' 05" |
| 2 | (United States) Lidl–Trek | + 2' 03" |
| 3 | (Switzerland) Tudor Pro Cycling Team | + 5' 22" |
| 4 | (United States) EF Education–EasyPost | + 5' 53" |
| 5 | (France) Cofidis | + 6' 01" |
| 6 | (Belgium) Alpecin–Deceuninck | + 6' 06" |
| 7 | (Netherlands) Visma–Lease a Bike | + 6' 07" |
| 8 | (Belgium) Soudal–Quick-Step | + 6' 15" |
| 9 | (France) Groupama–FDJ | + 8' 47" |
| 10 | (United Kingdom) Ineos Grenadiers | + 9' 27" |
