= Omar Mendoza (cyclist) =

Colombian cyclist

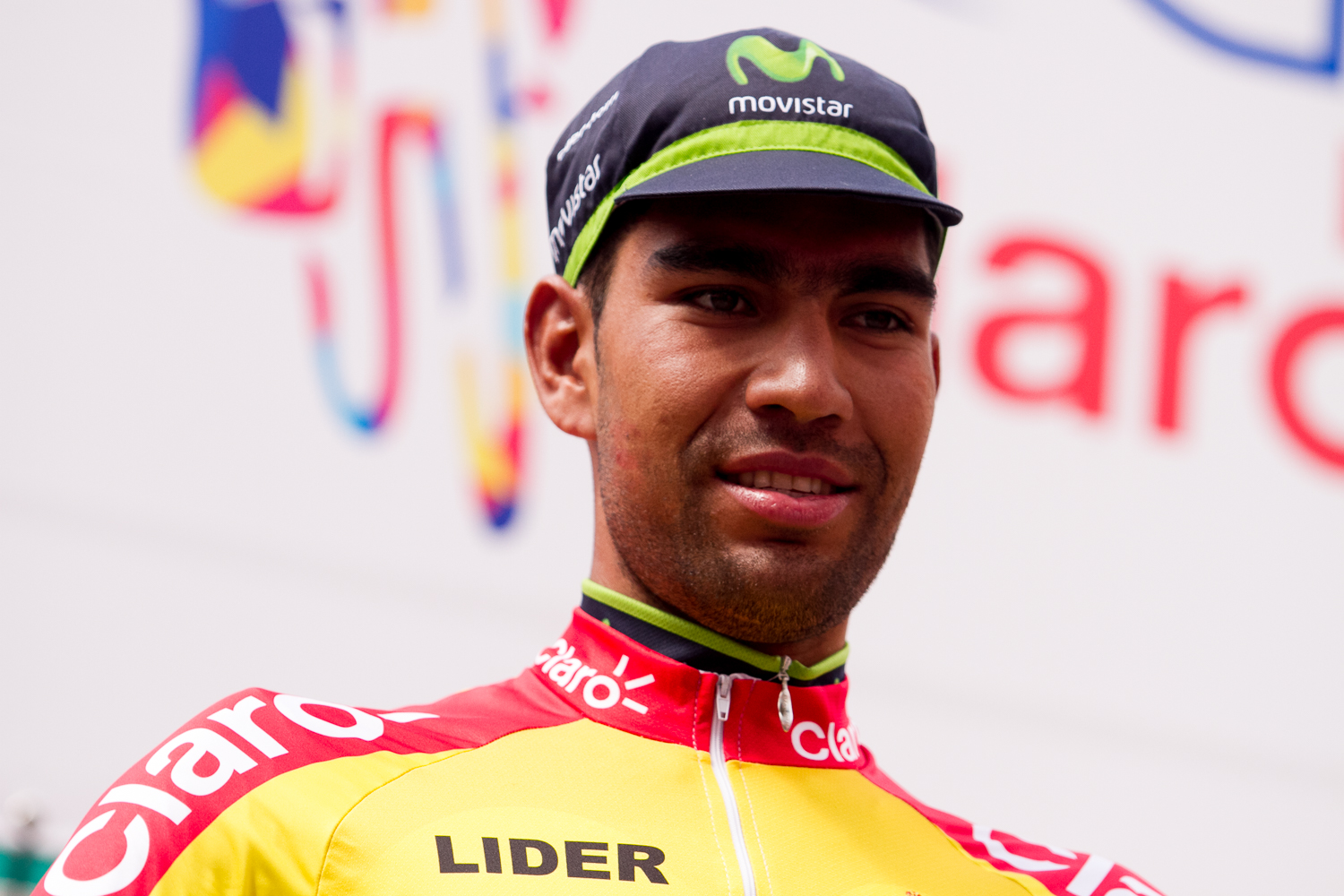
- Mendoza in 2015.

Personal information
- Full name: Omar Alberto Mendoza Cardona
- Born: 25 November 1989 (age 36) Lejanías, Colombia

Cycling career
- Sport: Cycling
- Current team: Retired
- Discipline: Road
- Role: Rider
- Rider type: Rouleur

Amateur teams
- 2011: IDRD–Liga de ciclismo de Bogotá
- 2021: Colombia Tierra de Atletas–GW Bicicletas
- 2023: Colombia Pacto por el Deporte

Professional teams
- 2012–2016: Movistar Continental Team
- 2017: Equipo Bolivia
- 2017: Bicicletas Strongman
- 2018: Medellín
- 2019: Team Manzana Postobón
- 2019: Coldeportes Bicicletas Strongman
- 2020: Colombia Tierra de Atletas–GW Bicicletas
- 2022: Colombia Tierra de Atletas–GW Shimano
- 2024: Petrolike

Omar Alberto Mendoza Cardona (born 25 November 1989 in Lejanías) is a Colombian former cyclist, who competed as a professional from 2012 to 2024.

== Major results ==
2014
2nd Time trial, National Road Championships
2015
1st Overall Clásico RCN

1st Stage 2

2017
1st Stage 2 Volta Internacional Cova da Beira
2018
6th Overall Vuelta a San Juan
2021
5th Time trial, National Road Championships
2022
6th Time trial, National Road Championships
