= Gonzalo Najar =

Argentine cyclist

Personal information
- Full name: Gonzalo Joaquín Najar
- Born: 27 November 1993 (age 32)

Cycling career
- Sport: Cycling
- Current team: Suspended
- Discipline: Road
- Role: Rider

Professional team
- 2015–2018: Sindicato de Empleados Publicos de San Juan

Gonzalo Joaquín Najar (born 27 November 1993) is an Argentine cyclist, who is currently suspended from the sport after a positive doping test.

== Career ==
Najar was the 2017 Argentina national champion.

=== 2018 Vuelta a San Juan ===
Najar won the 5th stage of the 2018 Vuelta a San Juan. Heading into the 5th stage, he was in 14th place, but after the stage he had over a minute lead. However, he was later stripped of his win; in May 2018, Najar tested positive for the third-generation EPO-based blood booster CERA on January 21 - the day of the opening stage of the 2018 Vuelta a San Juan. He was given a four-year ban.

== Major results ==
2017
National Road Championships

1st Road race
4th Time trial

2018
~~1st Overall Vuelta a San Juan~~

~~1st Stage 5~~
