= Italomat–Dogo =

Argentinian cycling team

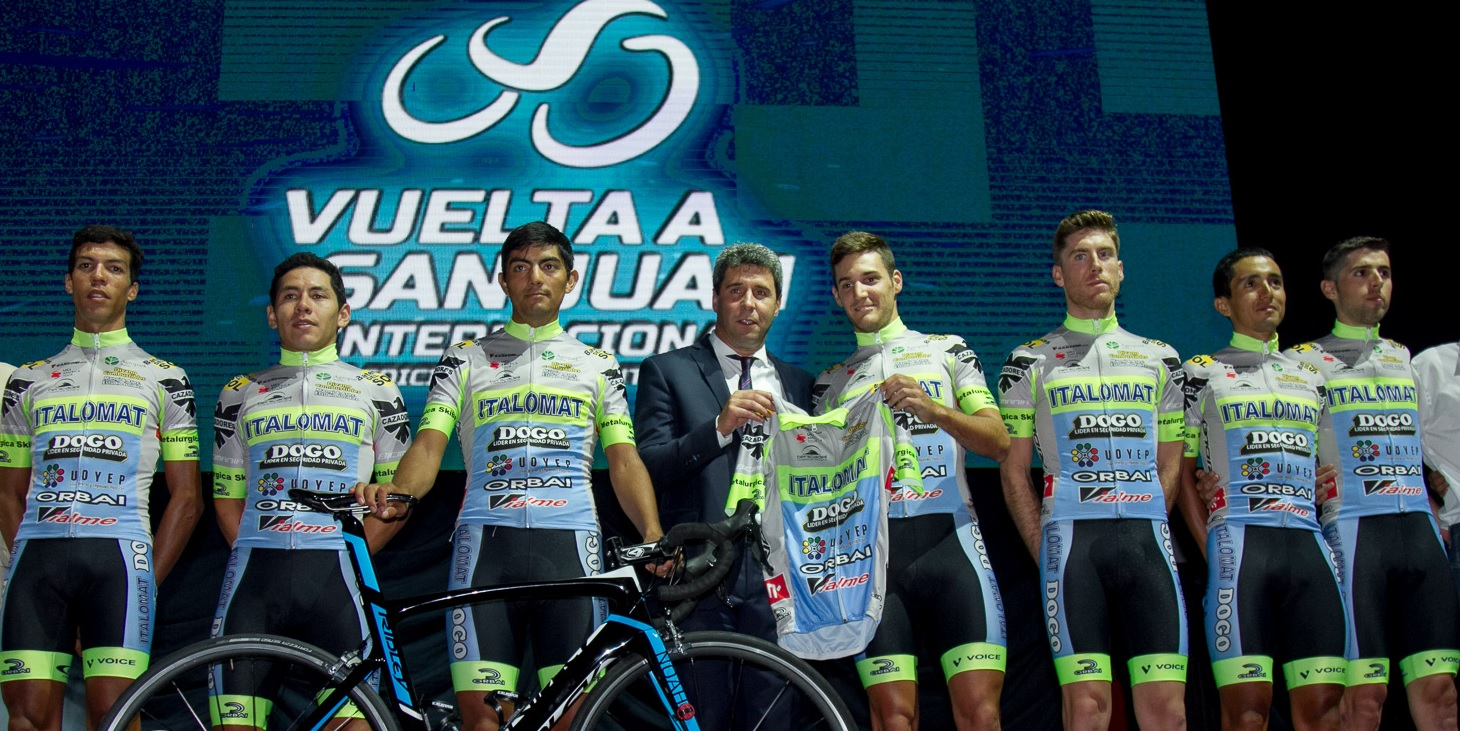

Team information
- UCI code: CID
- Registered: Argentina
- Founded: 2014
- Disbanded: 2017
- Discipline: Road
- Status: Amateur (2014-2016), UCI Continental (2017)

Key personnel
- General manager: Eduardo Trillini
- Team managers: Eduardo Trillini; Walter Trillini

Team name history
- 2014 2015–2016 2017: Italomat–Dogo; Italomat–Dogo–Orbai; Italomat–Dogo

Italomat–Dogo is an Argentinian UCI Continental cycling team founded in 2014.

The team disbanded at the end of the 2017 season.

== Team roster ==
Rider	Date of birth
Tomas Alcacer (ARG)	21 June 1998 (age 28)
Sergio González (ARG)	1 September 1980 (age 46)
Martin Hernández (ARG)	31 March 1979 (age 47)
Said Mansur (ARG)	15 June 1995 (age 31)
Juan Javier Melivillo (ARG)	22 April 1989 (age 37)
Miguel Angel Montes (ARG)	26 February 1987 (age 39)
Sebastian Martin Junior Trillini (ARG)	16 April 1994 (age 32)
Raul Alejandro Turano (ARG)	8 September 1978 (age 47)
