= Daniel Juárez (cyclist) =

Argentinian bicycle racer (born 1988)

Personal information
- Full name: Daniel Omar Juárez
- Born: 14 March 1988 (age 38) Las Breñas, Argentina

Cycling career
- Sport: Cycling
- Current team: Agrupación Virgen de Fátima–San Juan Biker Motos
- Discipline: Road
- Role: Rider
- Rider type: Sprinter

Amateur teams
- 2010: Fibro Plástica
- 2011: Los Mineros
- 2013–2014: Forjar Salud–UOM
- 2015: S.D. Catamarca
- 2015: Shania
- 2021: Agrupación Virgen de Fátima

Professional teams
- 2014: Ironage–Colner
- 2016: Vivo Team Grupo Oresy
- 2017–2018: Asociación Civil Mardan
- 2019: Sindicato de Empleados Publicos de San Juan
- 2020: Agrupación Virgen de Fátima–SaddleDrunk
- 2022–: Agrupación Virgen de Fátima–San Juan Biker Motos

Major wins
- One-day races and Classics National Road Race Championships (2013)

Daniel Omar Juárez (born 14 March 1988) is an Argentine road cyclist, who currently rides for UCI Continental team Agrupación Virgen de Fátima–San Juan Biker Motos.

== Major results ==
2013
1st Overall Doble Calingasta

1st Stage 1

1st Mendoza–San Juan
1st Stage 6 Vuelta a Mendoza
2015
1st Road race, National Road Championships
1st Clásica 1 de Mayo
2016
Volta Ciclística Internacional do Rio Grande do Sul

1st Points classification
1st Stage 2

5th Road race, National Road Championships
2018
1st Mountains classification Vuelta a San Juan
2020
1st Stage 2 Giro del Sol San Juan
2023
9th Overall Giro del Sol

2024
1st Road race, National Road Championships
