= Eugenio Alafaci =

Italian racing cyclist (born 1990)

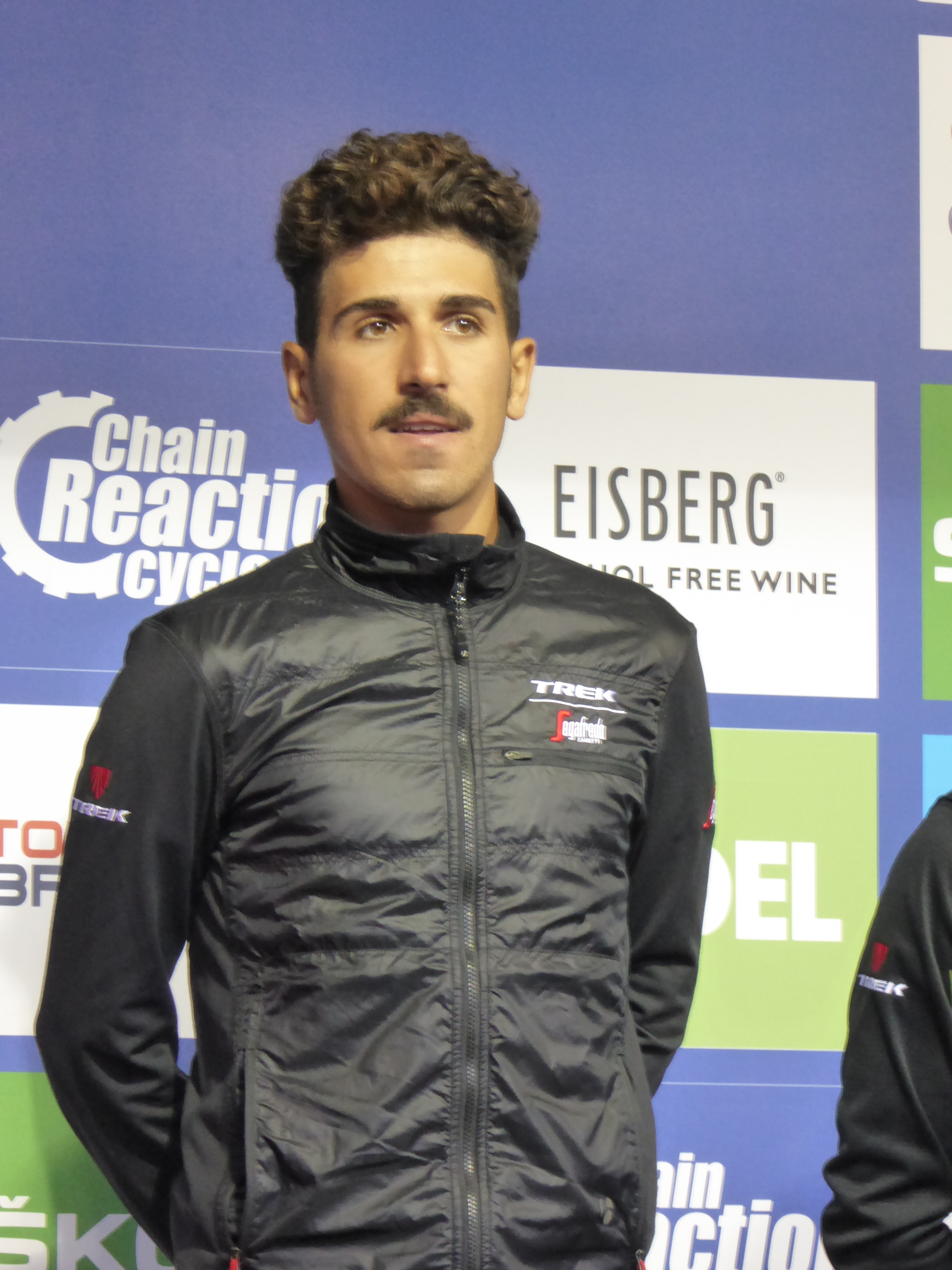
- Alafaci at the 2016 Tour of Britain

Personal information
- Full name: Eugenio Alafaci
- Born: 9 August 1990 (age 36) Carnago, Italy
- Height: 187 cm (6 ft 2 in)
- Weight: 77 kg (170 lb)

Cycling career
- Sport: Cycling
- Current team: Retired
- Discipline: Road
- Role: Rider
- Rider type: All-rounder

Amateur teams
- 2010–2011: Lucchini Maniva Ski Ecovalsabbia
- 2012–2013: Leopard–Trek Continental Team

Professional teams
- 2014–2018: Trek Factory Racing
- 2019: EvoPro Racing

Eugenio Alafaci (born 9 August 1990) is an Italian former professional racing cyclist, who rode professionally between 2014 and 2019 for the Trek–Segafredo and EvoPro Racing teams.

== Major results ==
2008
5th Road race, UCI Juniors World Championships
UEC European Junior Road Championships

9th Time trial
10th Road race

2010
5th Trofeo Città di Brescia
2011
7th Gran Premio della Liberazione
8th Circuito del Porto
2012
1st Points classification Tour du Loir-et-Cher
2nd Antwerpse Havenpijl
4th Overall Le Triptyque des Monts et Châteaux
4th Gooikse Pijl
9th De Vlaamse Pijl
2013
1st Omloop der Kempen
3rd Grand Prix Criquielion
4th Overall Flèche du Sud

1st Points classification

5th Overall Le Triptyque des Monts et Châteaux
6th Ronde van Midden-Nederland
9th Coppa Bernocchi

=== Grand Tour general classification results timeline ===
Grand Tour	2014	2015	2016	2017
Giro d'Italia	151	141	105	146
Tour de France	—	—	—	—
Vuelta a España	—	—	—	—

Legend
—	Did not compete
DNF	Did not finish
