= Ricardo Escuela =

Argentinian bicycle racer

Personal information
- Full name: Daniel Ricardo Escuela
- Born: 23 May 1983 (age 43)

Cycling career
- Sport: Cycling
- Current team: Agrupación Virgen de Fátima–San Juan Biker Motos
- Discipline: Road
- Role: Rider

Amateur teams
- 2005: Mantovani Rovigo
- 2006: Cyber–Oleodinamica Panni
- 2010: Virgen de Fátima
- 2011: Full Circle Sports
- 2012: Equipo Continental Municipalidad de Pocito
- 2013: Predator Carbon Repair
- 2015–2016: Equipo Continental Municipalidad de Pocito

Professional teams
- 2007–2008: Successfulliving.com–Parkpre
- 2009: Team Type 1
- 2014: InCycle–Predator Components
- 2017–: A.C. Agrupación Virgen de Fátima

Daniel Ricardo Escuela (born 23 May 1983) is an Argentine road cyclist, who currently rides for UCI Continental team Agrupación Virgen de Fátima–San Juan Biker Motos.

== Major results ==
2006
1st Stage 7 Giro Ciclistico d'Italia
2008
8th Philadelphia International Cycling Classic
2009
2nd Road race, National Road Championships
2012
2nd Road race, National Road Championships
2017
4th Overall Vuelta a San Juan
