= Agrupación Virgen de Fátima–San Juan Biker Motos =

Argentine cycling team

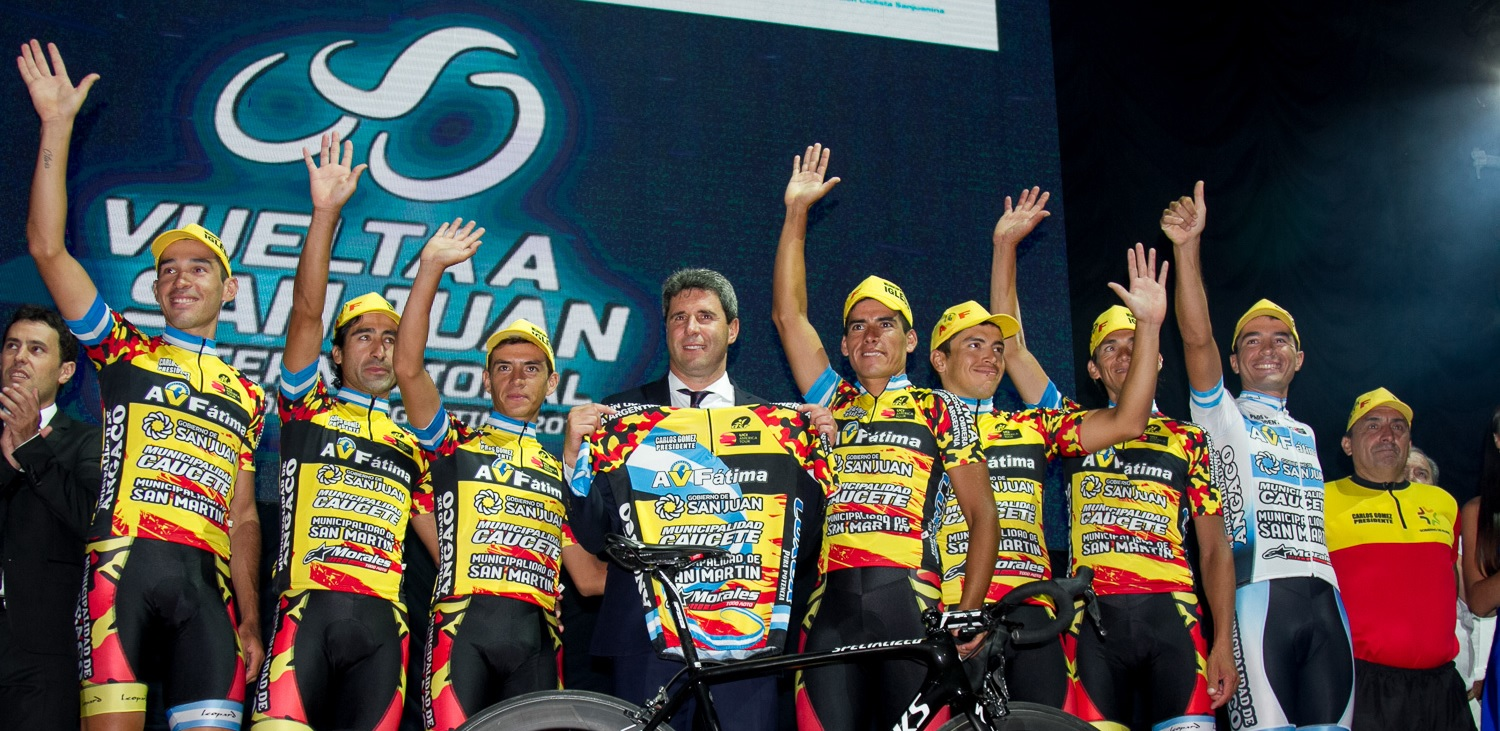

Team information
- UCI code: AFT (2017); AVF (2018–present)
- Registered: Argentina
- Founded: 2015
- Discipline: Road
- Status: Amateur (2014–2016, 2021–); UCI Continental (2017–2020)

Team name history
- 2015–2016 2017–2019 2020 2021 2022–: Agrupación Virgen de Fátima; Asociación Civil Agrupación Virgen de Fátima; Agrupación Virgen de Fátima–SaddleDrunk; Agrupación Virgen de Fátima; Agrupación Virgen de Fátima–San Juan Biker Motos

Agrupación Virgen de Fátima–San Juan Biker Motos is an Argentinian cycling team founded in 2015.

== Team roster ==
As of 23 February 2020.

Rider	Date of birth
Ricardo Escuela (ARG)	23 May 1983 (age 43)
Óscar Gómez (ARG)	30 July 1981 (age 45)
Daniel Juárez (ARG)	14 March 1988 (age 38)
Gabriel Juárez (ARG)	7 December 1990 (age 35)
Luciano Montivero (ARG)	21 September 1978 (age 47)

Rider	Date of birth
Nicolás Naranjo (ARG)	10 July 1990 (age 36)
Santiago Sánchez (ARG)	26 May 2000 (age 26)
Carlos Soto (ARG)	26 January 1989 (age 37)
Nicolás Tivani (ARG)	31 October 1995 (age 30)
Leandro Velardez (ARG)	17 September 1994 (age 31)

== Major results ==
2019
Stage 1 Vuelta del Uruguay, Nicolás Naranjo
Stages 2 & 9 Vuelta del Uruguay, Nicolás Tivani
2022
Overall Vuelta del Porvenir San Luis, Nicolás Tivani

Stages 2 & 4, Nicolás Tivani

Overall Vuelta a Formosa Internacional, Nicolás Tivani

Stages 2b & 4, Nicolás Tivani
