= Pocito Department =

Pocito Departamento Pocito
- Department
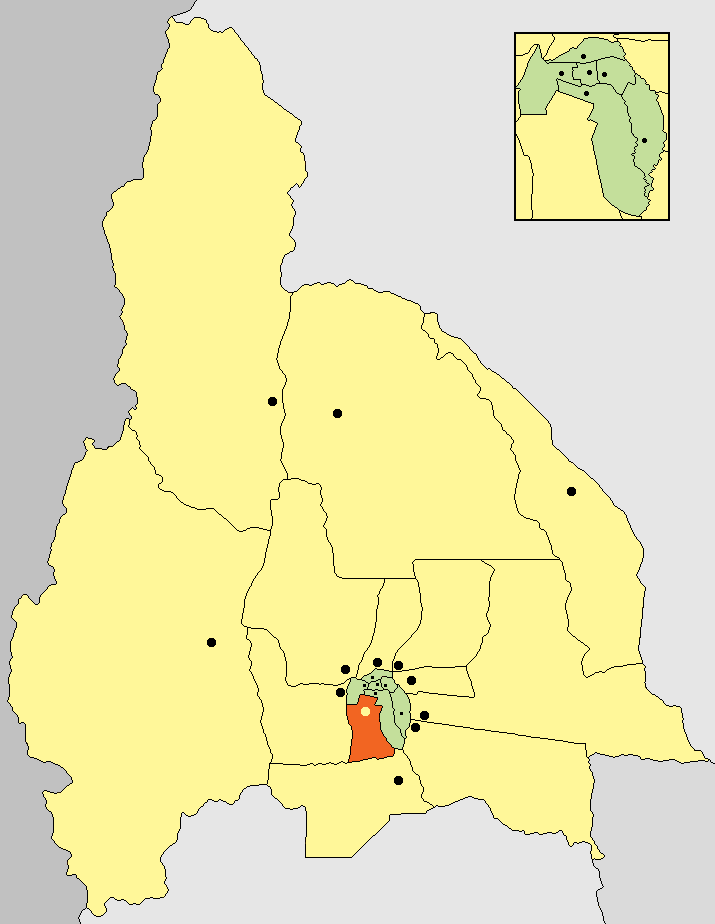
- location of Departamento Rawson in San Juan Province
- Coordinates: 31°39′S 68°33′W
- Country: Argentina
- Established: August 8, 1888
- Founder: ?
- Seat: Villa Aberastain

Government
  - Intendant: Fabian Aballay (PJ)

Area
  - Total: 515 km^{2} (199 sq mi)

Population (2021 census [INDEC])
  - Total: 72,915
  - Density: 142/km^{2} (367/sq mi)
- Demonym: pocitano/a
- Postal Code: 5400
- IFAM: SJU009
- Area Code: 0264
- Patron saint: Santa Bárbara
- Website: www.pocito.gov.ar

Pocito is a department in San Juan Province, Argentina. It is located to the south of the city of San Juan, and is predominantly agricultural, the principal products being grapes and olives. It has a string of prestigious wineries that make up the so-called "Wine Route". The west part of the department is mountainous.

== Origin of name ==
"Pocito" means "little pit" or "little hole" and was named after a supposed "little hole" where the legendary India Mariana found golden nuggets (See below).

== History ==
Nineteenth-century travelers would relate how Pocito was the first green land they encountered after leaving Mendoza.

The founder of the city is considered to be Dr. Jose Ignacio de la Roza, who divided up the land and planned the construction of the Pocito Canal.

After the May Revolution, the province was divided administratively into urban and rural areas. In 1834, Governor Jose Martin Yanzón and his Minister, Timoteo Bustamente, established departments in the Province of San Juan. Two departments were divided into three districts and Pocito was included in the third quarter of the Department of the South.

On January 16, 1851, the Governor Nazario Benavides approved the "Rules of Irrigation". As a result, Mr. Rosendo Bernardo, the inspector of water, divided the province of Pocito into eight sections, which number was later increased to nine and then ten.

On December 9, 1869, during the government of Dr. Jose Maria del Carril, the Departmental System Act came into being. Under Article 36 of the Constitution, the Province was redivided into eighteen departments, the fifth of which was Pocito.

On March 29, 1876 the Pocito Municipal Board was established, the first commissioner being Julian Mazo.

=== The Legend of India Mariana ===
In Pocitanas land, there once lived an old Huarpe Indian called Mariana, whose only company and defense was a faithful dog. She lived under a carob tree and invariably smoked a cigar. She occupied the time telling stories of adventures to children who visited her, and sold "brilliant pebbles" to travelers and neighbors. These were nuggets of gold, which she always maintained came from the "pocito".

One dark night, some Spaniards wandering nearby were attracted by the glow of a lit cigarette. Great was their surprise when, approaching the carob tree, they were attacked by the faithful dog baring his canines. The robbers fled in fear, pursued by the woman who came out laughing from under the tree. That night an earthquake rocked the region and Mariana was seen no more. Her pocito was eagerly sought, but the source of the gold was never found.

=== The Statue of Liberty ===
According to some testimonies, it was Cantoni Federico who, as an officer of that time, visited France and had the "Statue of Liberty" created as ordered by national authorities. That is why the date 1810-1910 and the Argentine shield are seen on the left of the statue.

Federico Cantoni ordered that the statue be sent to the province of San Juan, its intended location being the park. This was done on the centenary of the "First Cry of Freedom", in May, 1810. On July 9, 1931, the engineer Mark Zalazar Pocito moved the statue and had it placed in the square that now bears the name "Freedom Square".

== Geography ==
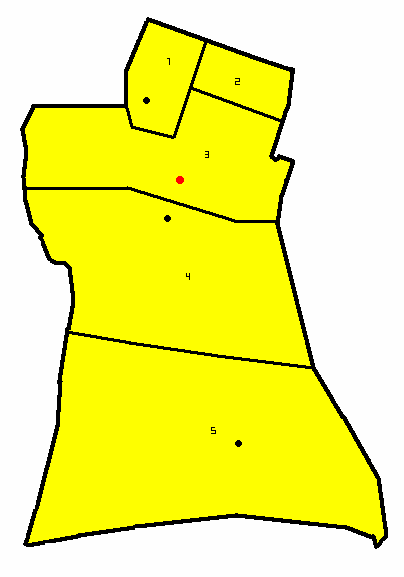
Map departmental division * 1 Quinto Cuartel * 2 zone adjacent to San Juan, (Villa Barboza and Nacusi) * 3 Aberastain * 4 La Rinconada * 5 Carpinteria

The department is located in the province of San Juan, fifteen kilometers south of the capital, San Juan, and has an area of 1330 square kilometers. It shares borders:

- To the north with the departments of Rawson and Rivadavia
- To the south with the Sarmiento
- To the east with the department of Rawson
- To the west with the department of Zonda

=== Relief ===
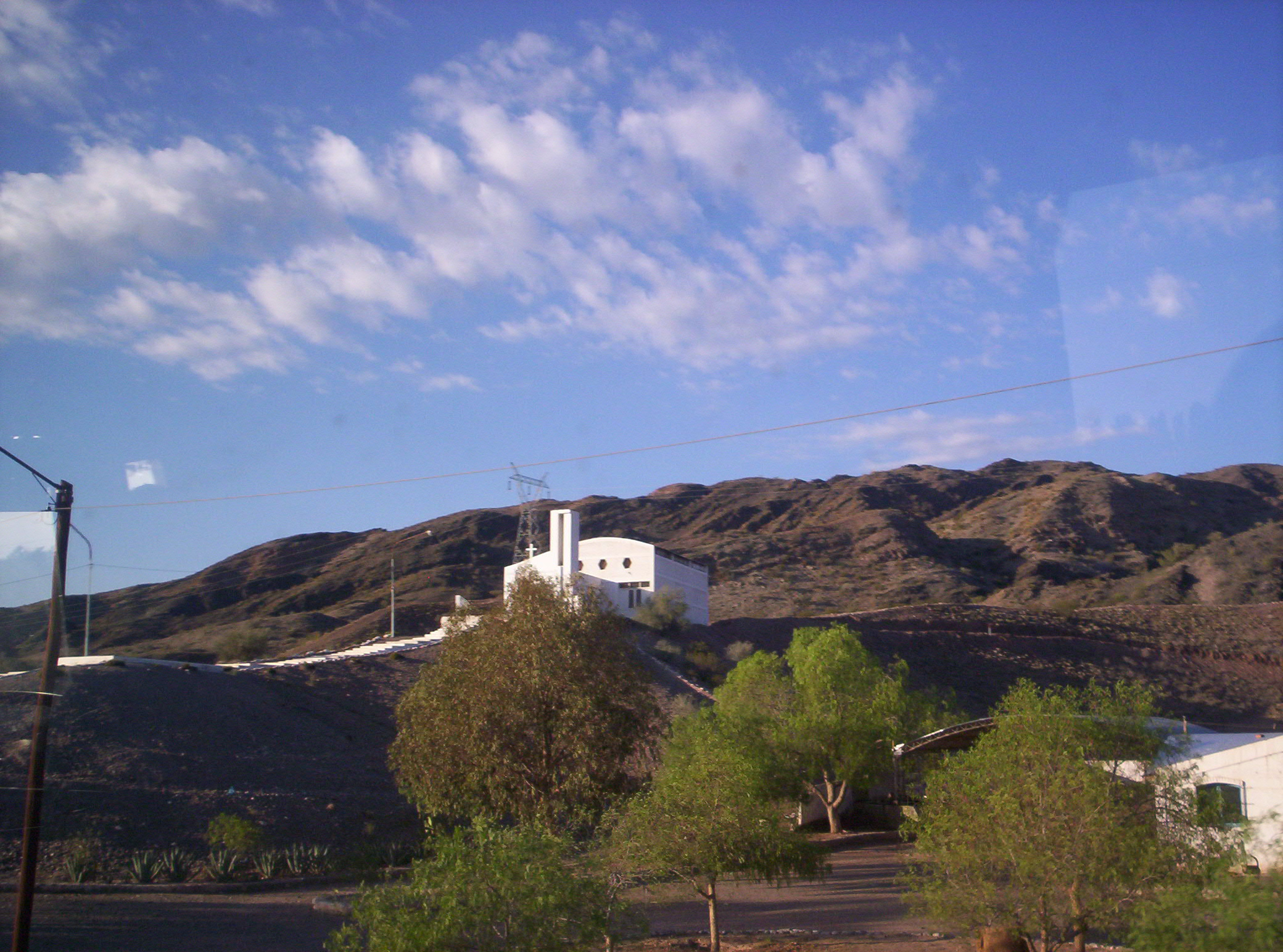
A church in the Valdivia hills located in the south of the department

The mountainous area located in the western sector is a series of ridges with a general north–south direction. These include the Cordon de Las Lajas, the hills of La Rinconada and the Cordon of the Arrow. These are in turn attached to the main range, the Mountains of Zonda. The maximum elevation of over 2000 meters is on the western boundary of the department and the ground generally slopes towards the east. The formation of the Cerro Valdivia is isolated geologically. It is one of the foothills of the Sierras pampeanas formed in the Paleozoic era.

In the rest of the department there is deep soil resulting from water erosion of the mountainous area. Further eastward the soil is shallower and composed of fine material from the canal zone of the Quinto Cuartel division. This area is used as arable land and is irrigated through a network of channels that flow from the San Juan River.

The flora is composed of carob, jarilla (in the lower parts of the mountains), chañares, aragua (on the slopes), tuscas, chilcas and pichanas (in the wet valleys).

Among the animals living here are guanacos, vicunas, foxes, mice, Andean condors, lechuzos, chimangos, partridges, martinetas, hares and wild rabbits.

=== Hydrography ===
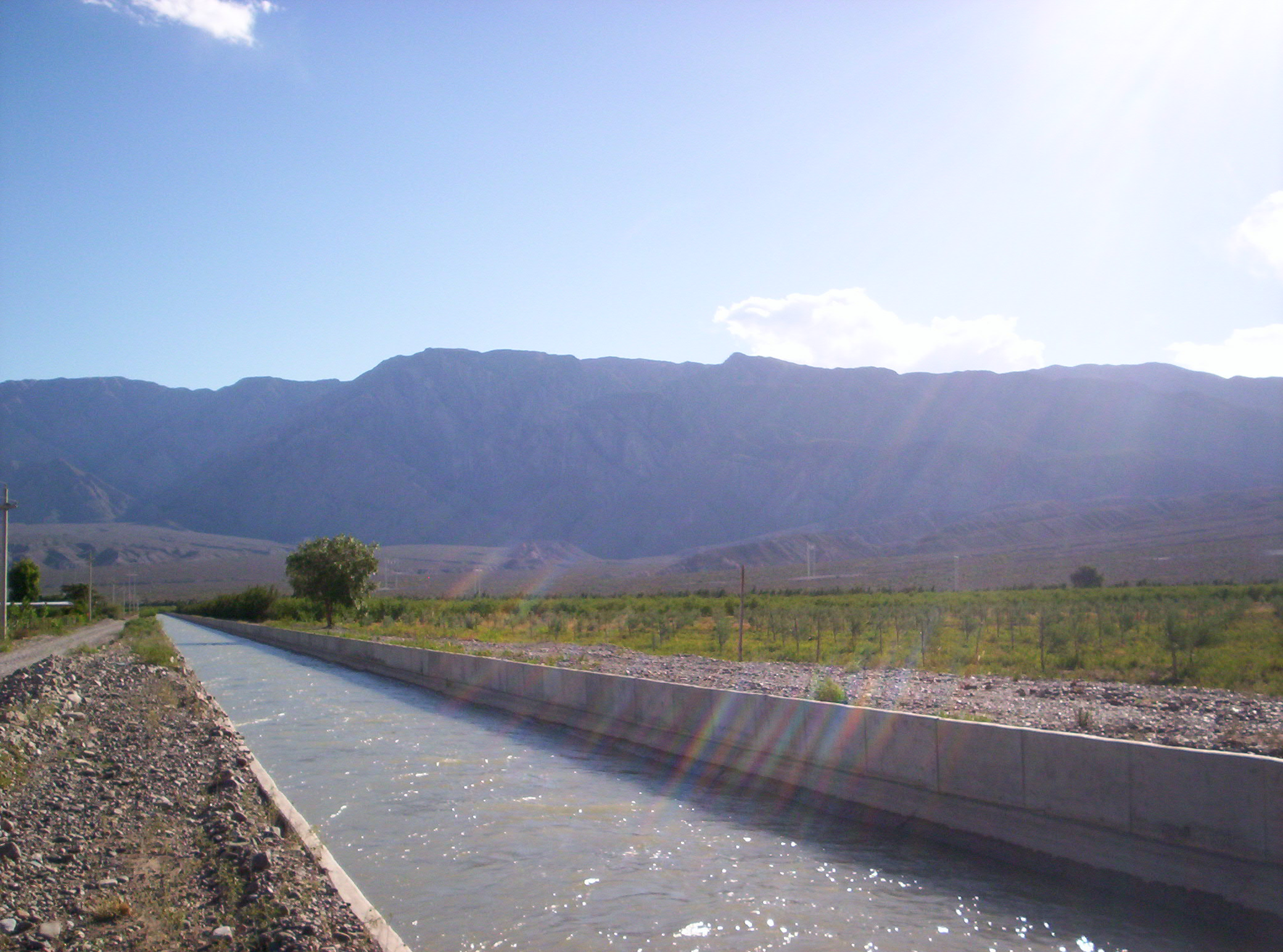
Canal regadio

The irrigation network originates from channels that run from north to south and draw their water from the right bank of the San Juan River. This water is used by farmers in growing areas.

=== Climate ===
The climate is dry with a maximum temperatures of 40 °C in summer and minimum below zero in winter. The atmospheric pressure and humidity are generally low and are at a minimum during the months of August and September due to the dry Zonda wind that blows down from the mountains.

== Population ==
According to the census of 2001, Pocito Department has 40,969 inhabitants, making it one of the most populated areas of the province. The majority of the people live in the largest village, Villa Aberastain and the district La Rinconada located a few kilometres to the south, forming a continuous urban corridor called Aberastain-La Rinconada. In the north, near the boundary with Rawson, there is a large population which is contiguous with San Juan and to the south lies the district of Carpintería, where most of the population is involved in agriculture.

== Economy ==
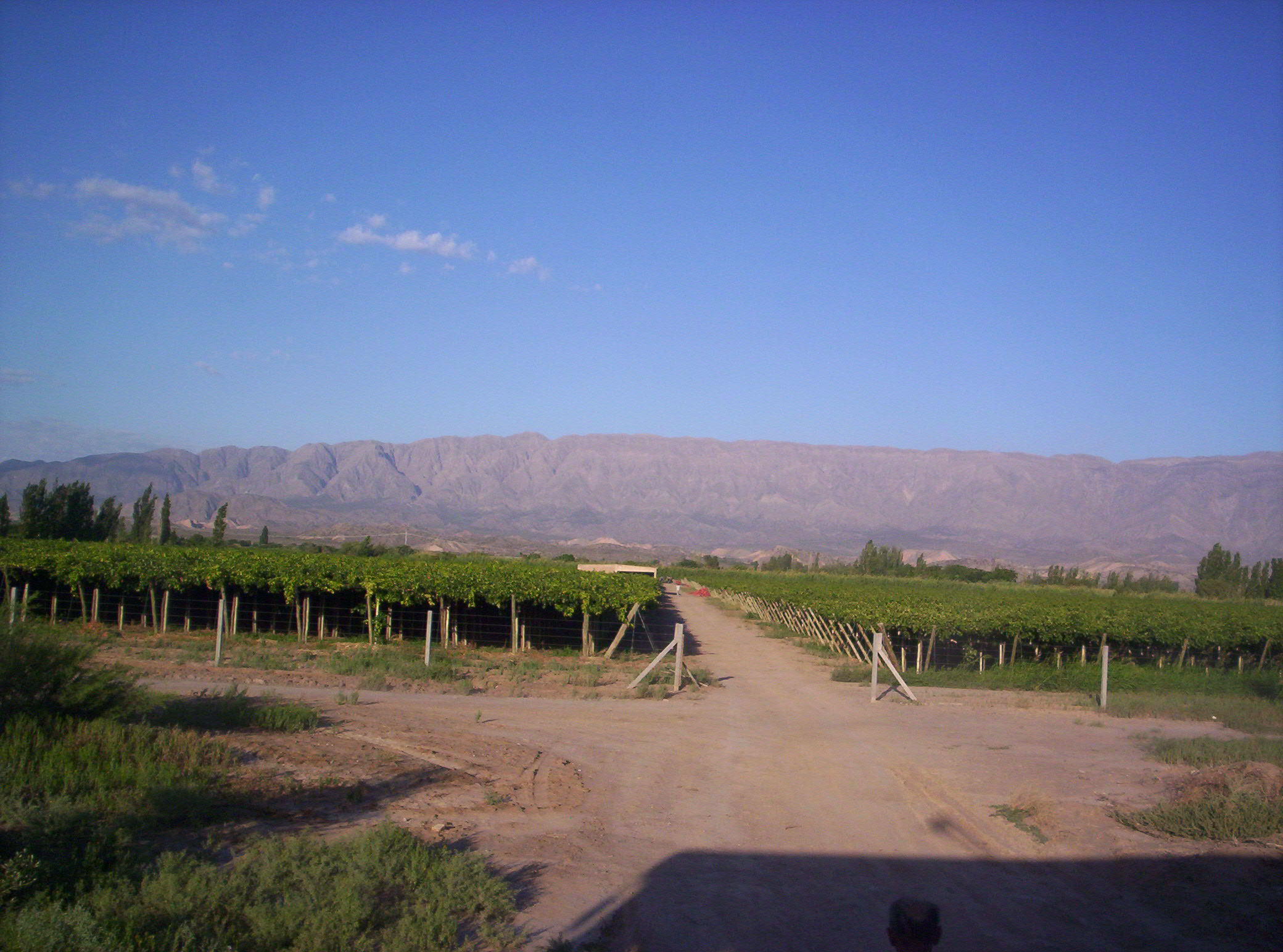
Vineyards in Carpintería (San Luis)

The territory of Pocito has five types of soils classified as very good for growing crops. Agriculture and the agroindustry are the main sources of income.

9,615 hectares of the department are under cultivation. Crops grown in the area include wine and table grapes, vegetables (garlic, onion, tomatoes, squash, sweet potato, stud, peppers, alcaucil, beans, mangold, lettuce, beet, potatoes, corn, peas, carrot), olives, almonds and fruit (melon, peach, plum), forage, timber and seed.
