= Municipalidad de Pocito =

Argentine cycling team

Team information
- UCI code: EMP
- Registered: Argentina
- Founded: 2010
- Discipline: Road
- Status: UCI Continental (2017–)

Key personnel
- General manager: Ricardo Julio
- Team manager: Rubén Eleazar Ramos

Team name history
- 2010–: Municipalidad de Pocito

Equipo Continental Municipalidad de Pocito is an Argentinian UCI Continental cycling team founded in 2010.

== Team roster ==
As of 7 February 2021.

Rider	Date of birth
Milton Aguilera (ARG)	15 December 2002 (age 23)
Gerardo Atencio (ARG)	27 April 1996 (age 30)
Franco Buchanan (ARG)	6 November 1992 (age 33)
Mauricio Domínguez (ARG)	22 December 2001 (age 24)
Juan Melivillo (ARG)	22 April 1989 (age 37)

Rider	Date of birth
Duilio Ramos (ARG)	4 March 1996 (age 30)
Rubén Ramos (ARG)	2 November 1992 (age 33)
José Martín Reyes (ARG)	17 August 1992 (age 34)
Washington Roberto (ARG)	14 May 1999 (age 27)
Gerardo Tivani (ARG)	26 January 1991 (age 35)

== Major results ==
2018
Stages 4 & 10 Vuelta Ciclista del Uruguay, Héctor Lucero
