= Municipalidad de Rawson =

Argentine cycling team

Team information
- UCI code: MRW
- Registered: Argentina
- Founded: 2015
- Discipline: Road
- Status: Amateur (2015–2016); UCI Continental (2017–)

Key personnel
- General manager: Mario Orlando Ramirez
- Team manager: Armando Ramirez

Team name history
- 2015–2017 2018–: Municipalidad de Rawson–Somos Todos; Municipalidad de Rawson

Municipalidad de Rawson is an Argentinian UCI Continental cycling team founded in 2015, that has been competing at UCI Continental level since 2017.

== Team roster ==
As of 19 April 2020.

Rider	Date of birth
Sergio Aguirre (ARG)	25 November 1976 (age 49)
Kevin Castro (ARG)	17 April 1999 (age 27)
Facundo Cattapán (ARG)	5 May 1998 (age 28)
Diego Galván (ARG)	16 November 2000 (age 25)
Pedro Gordillo (ARG)	7 July 1984 (age 42)

Rider	Date of birth
Mauricio Graziani (ARG)	6 August 1996 (age 30)
Higiño Lucero (ARG)	8 August 1990 (age 36)
Alejandro Quilci (ARG)	12 July 1987 (age 39)
Leonardo Rodríguez (ARG)	20 March 1998 (age 28)
Diego Tivani (ARG)	15 March 1992 (age 34)
