= 2023 Vuelta a San Juan =

2023 UCI ProSeries

Race details
- Dates: 22–29 January
- Stages: 7
- Distance: 1,143 km (710 mi)
- Winning time: 25h 40' 57"

Results
Jersey awarded to the overall winner	Winner	Miguel Ángel López (COL)	(Team Medellín–EPM)
	Second	Filippo Ganna (ITA)	(INEOS Grenadiers)
	Third	Sergio Higuita (COL)	(Bora–Hansgrohe)
Jersey awarded to the mountains classification winner	Mountains	Manuele Tarozzi (ITA)	(Green Project–Bardiani–CSF–Faizanè)
Jersey awarded to the young rider classification winner	Young rider	Matthew Riccitello (USA)	(Israel–Premier Tech)
Jersey awarded to the sprints classification winner	Sprints	Gerardo Tivani (ARG)	(Agrupación Virgen de Fátima–San Juan Biker Motos)
	Team	(United Kingdom) INEOS Grenadiers	

The 2023 Vuelta a San Juan is a road cycling stage race that takes place in the San Juan Province of Argentina between 22 and 29 January 2023. The race is rated as a 2.Pro event as part of the 2023 UCI ProSeries, and is the 39th edition of the Vuelta a San Juan.

== Teams ==
Twenty-six teams were invited to the race. Of these teams, seven are UCI WorldTour teams, five are UCI Professional Continental teams, ten are UCI Continental teams, and four are national teams.

UCI WorldTeams

- Astana Qazaqstan Team
- Bora–Hansgrohe
- INEOS Grenadiers
- Movistar Team
- Soudal–Quick-Step
- Team DSM
- Trek–Segafredo

UCI Professional Continental Teams

- Eolo–Kometa
- Green Project–Bardiani–CSF–Faizanè
- Israel–Premier Tech
- Team Corratec
- Team TotalEnergies

UCI Continental Teams

- Agrupación Virgen de Fátima–San Juan Biker Motos
- AP Hotels & Resorts–Tavira–SC Farense
- Chimbas Te Quiero
- Equipo Continental Municipalidad de Pocito
- Gremios por el Deporte–Cutral Co
- Municipalidad de Rawson
- Panamá es Cultura y Valores
- Sindicato de Empleados Publicos de San Juan
- Team Banco Guayaquil–Ecuador
- Team Medellín–EPM

National Teams

- Argentina
- Chile
- Italy
- Uruguay

== Route ==
Stage characteristics and winners
Stage	Date	Course	Distance	Type	Stage winner
1	22 January	San Juan to San Juan	143.9 km (89.4 mi)	Flat stage	Sam Bennett (IRL)
2	23 January	Valle Fértil to Jáchal	201.1 km (125.0 mi)	Flat stage	Fabio Jakobsen (NED)
3	24 January	Circuito San Juan Villicum to Circuito San Juan Villicum	170.9 km (106.2 mi)	Hilly stage	Quinn Simmons (USA)
4	25 January	Circuito San Juan Villicum to Barreal	196.5 km (122.1 mi)	Flat stage	Fernando Gaviria (COL)
	26 January			Rest day	
5	27 January	Chimbas to Alto Colorado	173.7 km (107.9 mi)	Mountain stage	Miguel Ángel López (COL)
6	28 January	Velódromo Vicente Chancay to Velódromo Vicente Chancay	144.9 km (90.0 mi)	Flat stage	Sam Welsford (AUS)
7	29 January	San Juan to San Juan	112 km (70 mi)	Flat stage	Sam Welsford (AUS)
Total		1,143 km (710.2 mi)			

== Stages ==
=== Stage 1 ===
22 January 2023 — San Juan to San Juan, 143.9 km (89.4 mi)

Stage 1 Result
Rank	Rider	Team	Time
1	Sam Bennett (IRL)	Bora–Hansgrohe	3h 19' 16"
2	Michael Mørkøv (DEN)	Soudal–Quick-Step	+ 0"
3	Giacomo Nizzolo (ITA)	Israel–Premier Tech	+ 0"
4	Danny van Poppel (NED)	Bora–Hansgrohe	+ 0"
5	Gleb Syritsa	Astana Qazaqstan Team	+ 0"
6	Elia Viviani (ITA)	INEOS Grenadiers	+ 0"
7	Peter Sagan (SVK)	Team TotalEnergies	+ 0"
8	Jhonatan Narváez (ECU)	INEOS Grenadiers	+ 0"
9	Enrico Zanoncello (ITA)	Green Project–Bardiani–CSF–Faizanè	+ 0"
10	Attilio Viviani (ITA)	Team Corratec	+ 0"

General classification after Stage 1
Rank	Rider	Team	Time
1	Sam Bennett (IRL)	Bora–Hansgrohe	3h 19' 16"
2	Michael Mørkøv (DEN)	Soudal–Quick-Step	+ 4"
3	Giacomo Nizzolo (ITA)	Israel–Premier Tech	+ 6"
4	Danny van Poppel (NED)	Bora–Hansgrohe	+ 10"
5	Gleb Syritsa	Astana Qazaqstan Team	+ 10"
6	Elia Viviani (ITA)	INEOS Grenadiers	+ 10"
7	Peter Sagan (SVK)	Team TotalEnergies	+ 10"
8	Jhonatan Narváez (ECU)	INEOS Grenadiers	+ 10"
9	Enrico Zanoncello (ITA)	Green Project–Bardiani–CSF–Faizanè	+ 10"
10	Attilio Viviani (ITA)	Team Corratec	+ 10"

=== Stage 2 ===
23 January 2023 — Valle Fértil to Jáchal, 201.1 km (125.0 mi)

Stage 2 Result
Rank	Rider	Team	Time
1	Fabio Jakobsen (NED)	Soudal–Quick-Step	4h 22' 22"
2	Fernando Gaviria (COL)	Movistar Team	+ 0"
3	Jon Aberasturi (ESP)	Trek–Segafredo	+ 0"
4	Sam Bennett (IRL)	Bora–Hansgrohe	+ 0"
5	Nicolás Tivani (ARG)	Team Corratec	+ 0"
6	Giacomo Nizzolo (ITA)	Israel–Premier Tech	+ 0"
7	Tobias Lund Andresen (DEN)	Team DSM	+ 0"
8	Elia Viviani (ITA)	INEOS Grenadiers	+ 0"
9	Peter Sagan (SVK)	Team TotalEnergies	+ 0"
10	Niklas Märkl (GER)	Team DSM	+ 0"

General classification after Stage 2
Rank	Rider	Team	Time
1	Sam Bennett (IRL)	Bora–Hansgrohe	7h 41' 28"
2	Fabio Jakobsen (NED)	Soudal–Quick-Step	+ 0"
3	Fernando Gaviria (COL)	Movistar Team	+ 4"
4	Michael Mørkøv (DEN)	Soudal–Quick-Step	+ 4"
5	Giacomo Nizzolo (ITA)	Israel–Premier Tech	+ 6"
6	Jon Aberasturi (ESP)	Trek–Segafredo	+ 6"
7	Óscar Sevilla (ESP)	Team Medellín–EPM	+ 6"
8	Elia Viviani (ITA)	INEOS Grenadiers	+ 10"
9	Peter Sagan (SVK)	Team TotalEnergies	+ 10"
10	Danny van Poppel (NED)	Bora–Hansgrohe	+ 10"

=== Stage 3 ===
24 January 2023 — Circuito San Juan Villicum to Circuito San Juan Villicum, 170.9 km (106.2 mi)

Stage 3 Result
Rank	Rider	Team	Time
1	Quinn Simmons (USA)	Trek–Segafredo	3h 49' 30"
2	Maximiliano Richeze (ARG)	Argentina	+ 0"
3	Sam Bennett (IRL)	Bora–Hansgrohe	+ 0"
4	Fernando Gaviria (COL)	Movistar Team	+ 0"
5	Giacomo Nizzolo (ITA)	Israel–Premier Tech	+ 0"
6	Peter Sagan (SVK)	Team TotalEnergies	+ 0"
7	Nicolás Tivani (ARG)	Team Corratec	+ 0"
8	Yves Lampaert (BEL)	Soudal–Quick-Step	+ 0"
9	Daniel Oss (ITA)	Team TotalEnergies	+ 0"
10	Juan Pablo Dotti (ARG)	Sindicato de Empleados Publicos de San Juan	+ 0"

General classification after Stage 3
Rank	Rider	Team	Time
1	Sam Bennett (IRL)	Bora–Hansgrohe	11h 30' 54"
2	Fabio Jakobsen (NED)	Soudal–Quick-Step	+ 6"
3	Fernando Gaviria (COL)	Movistar Team	+ 8"
4	Giacomo Nizzolo (ITA)	Israel–Premier Tech	+ 10"
5	Peter Sagan (SVK)	Team TotalEnergies	+ 14"
6	Danny van Poppel (NED)	Bora–Hansgrohe	+ 14"
7	Tobias Lund Andresen (DEN)	Team DSM	+ 14"
8	Nicolás Tivani (ARG)	Team Corratec	+ 14"
9	Daniel Oss (ITA)	Team TotalEnergies	+ 14"
10	Yves Lampaert (BEL)	Soudal–Quick-Step	+ 14"

=== Stage 4 ===
25 January 2023 — Circuito San Juan Villicum to Barreal, 196.5 km (122.1 mi)

Stage 4 Result
Rank	Rider	Team	Time
1	Fernando Gaviria (COL)	Movistar Team	4h 35' 27"
2	Peter Sagan (SVK)	Team TotalEnergies	+ 0"
3	Filippo Ganna (ITA)	INEOS Grenadiers	+ 0"
4	Yves Lampaert (BEL)	Soudal–Quick-Step	+ 0"
5	Niklas Märkl (GER)	Team DSM	+ 0"
6	Brandon Rivera (COL)	INEOS Grenadiers	+ 0"
7	Nicolás Tivani (ARG)	Team Corratec	+ 0"
8	Quinn Simmons (USA)	Trek–Segafredo	+ 0"
9	Laureano Rosas (ARG)	Gremios por el Deporte–Cutral Co	+ 0"
10	Mathias Vacek (CZE)	Trek–Segafredo	+ 0"

General classification after Stage 4
Rank	Rider	Team	Time
1	Fernando Gaviria (COL)	Movistar Team	16h 06' 19"
2	Peter Sagan (SVK)	Team TotalEnergies	+ 10"
3	Juan Pablo Dotti (ARG)	Sindicato de Empleados Publicos de San Juan	+ 13"
4	Filippo Ganna (ITA)	INEOS Grenadiers	+ 14"
5	Nicolás Tivani (ARG)	Team Corratec	+ 16"
6	Tobias Lund Andresen (DEN)	Team DSM	+ 16"
7	Daniel Oss (ITA)	Team TotalEnergies	+ 16"
8	Yves Lampaert (BEL)	Soudal–Quick-Step	+ 16"
9	Mathias Vacek (CZE)	Trek–Segafredo	+ 16"
10	Óscar Sevilla (ESP)	Team Medellín–EPM	+ 16"

=== Rest day ===
26 January 2023

=== Stage 5 ===
27 January 2023 — Chimbas to Alto Colorado, 173.7 km (107.9 mi)

Stage 5 Result
Rank	Rider	Team	Time
1	Miguel Ángel López (COL)	Team Medellín–EPM	4h 07' 10"
2	Filippo Ganna (ITA)	INEOS Grenadiers	+ 30"
3	Sergio Higuita (COL)	Bora–Hansgrohe	+ 38"
4	Egan Bernal (COL)	INEOS Grenadiers	+ 40"
5	Einer Rubio (COL)	Movistar Team	+ 40"
6	Brandon Rivera (COL)	INEOS Grenadiers	+ 51"
7	Remco Evenepoel (BEL)	Soudal–Quick-Step	+ 1' 09"
8	Nicolás Paredes (COL)	Sindicato de Empleados Publicos de San Juan	+ 1' 09"
9	Kevin Vermaerke (USA)	Team DSM	+ 1' 11"
10	Quinn Simmons (USA)	Trek–Segafredo	+ 1' 31"

General classification after Stage 5
Rank	Rider	Team	Time
1	Miguel Ángel López (COL)	Team Medellín–EPM	20h 13' 27"
2	Filippo Ganna (ITA)	INEOS Grenadiers	+ 30"
3	Sergio Higuita (COL)	Bora–Hansgrohe	+ 44"
4	Egan Bernal (COL)	INEOS Grenadiers	+ 50"
5	Einer Rubio (COL)	Movistar Team	+ 50"
6	Brandon Rivera (COL)	INEOS Grenadiers	+ 1' 01"
7	Nicolás Paredes (COL)	Sindicato de Empleados Publicos de San Juan	+ 1' 19"
8	Remco Evenepoel (BEL)	Soudal–Quick-Step	+ 1' 19"
9	Kevin Vermaerke (USA)	Team DSM	+ 1' 30"
10	Matthew Riccitello (USA)	Israel–Premier Tech	+ 1' 41"

=== Stage 6 ===
28 January 2023 — Velódromo Vicente Chancay to Velódromo Vicente Chancay, 144.9 km (90.0 mi)

Stage 6 Result
Rank	Rider	Team	Time
1	Sam Welsford (AUS)	Team DSM	3h 03' 39"
2	Sam Bennett (IRL)	Bora–Hansgrohe	+ 0"
3	Fernando Gaviria (COL)	Movistar Team	+ 0"
4	Fabio Jakobsen (NED)	Soudal–Quick-Step	+ 0"
5	Attilio Viviani (ITA)	Team Corratec	+ 0"
6	Peter Sagan (SVK)	Team TotalEnergies	+ 0"
7	Gleb Syritsa	Astana Qazaqstan Team	+ 0"
8	Elia Viviani (ITA)	INEOS Grenadiers	+ 0"
9	Enrico Zanoncello (ITA)	Green Project–Bardiani–CSF–Faizanè	+ 0"
10	Mattia Pinazzi (ITA)	Italy	+ 0"

General classification after Stage 6
Rank	Rider	Team	Time
1	Miguel Ángel López (COL)	Team Medellín–EPM	23h 17' 16"
2	Filippo Ganna (ITA)	INEOS Grenadiers	+ 30"
3	Sergio Higuita (COL)	Bora–Hansgrohe	+ 44"
4	Einer Rubio (COL)	Movistar Team	+ 50"
5	Brandon Rivera (COL)	INEOS Grenadiers	+ 1' 01"
6	Nicolás Paredes (COL)	Sindicato de Empleados Publicos de San Juan	+ 1' 19"
7	Remco Evenepoel (BEL)	Soudal–Quick-Step	+ 1' 19"
8	Kevin Vermaerke (USA)	Team DSM	+ 1' 30"
9	Matthew Riccitello (USA)	Israel–Premier Tech	+ 1' 41"
10	Quinn Simmons (USA)	Trek–Segafredo	+ 1' 46"

=== Stage 7 ===
29 January 2023 — San Juan to San Juan, 112 km (70 mi)

Stage 6 Result
Rank	Rider	Team	Time
1	Sam Welsford (AUS)	Team DSM	2h 23' 41"
2	Fabio Jakobsen (NED)	Soudal–Quick-Step	+ 0"
3	Giacomo Nizzolo (ITA)	Israel–Premier Tech	+ 0"
4	Yevgeniy Gidich (KAZ)	Astana Qazaqstan Team	+ 0"
5	Danny van Poppel (NED)	Bora–Hansgrohe	+ 0"
6	Attilio Viviani (ITA)	Team Corratec	+ 0"
7	Giovanni Leonardi (ITA)	Eolo–Kometa	+ 0"
8	Peter Sagan (SVK)	Team TotalEnergies	+ 0"
9	Jon Aberasturi (ESP)	Trek–Segafredo	+ 0"
10	Enrico Zanoncello (ITA)	Green Project–Bardiani–CSF–Faizanè	+ 0"

General classification after Stage 7
Rank	Rider	Team	Time
1	Miguel Ángel López (COL)	Team Medellín–EPM	25h 40' 57"
2	Filippo Ganna (ITA)	INEOS Grenadiers	+ 30"
3	Sergio Higuita (COL)	Bora–Hansgrohe	+ 44"
4	Einer Rubio (COL)	Movistar Team	+ 50"
5	Brandon Rivera (COL)	INEOS Grenadiers	+ 1' 01"
6	Nicolás Paredes (COL)	Sindicato de Empleados Publicos de San Juan	+ 1' 19"
7	Remco Evenepoel (BEL)	Soudal–Quick-Step	+ 1' 19"
8	Kevin Vermaerke (USA)	Team DSM	+ 1' 30"
9	Matthew Riccitello (USA)	Israel–Premier Tech	+ 1' 41"
10	Quinn Simmons (USA)	Trek–Segafredo	+ 1' 46"

== Classification leadership table ==
Classification leadership by stage
Stage	Winner	General classification	Mountains classification	Sprints classification	Young rider classification	Teams classification
1	Sam Bennett	Sam Bennett	Christofer Jurado	Leonardo Cobarrubia	Tobias Lund Andresen	Bora–Hansgrohe
2	Fabio Jakobsen	Sam Bennett	Tomas Contte	Gerardo Tivani	Tobias Lund Andresen	Team DSM
3	Quinn Simmons	Sam Bennett	Tomas Contte	Daniel Juarez	Tobias Lund Andresen	Bora–Hansgrohe
4	Fernando Gaviria	Fernando Gaviria	Manuele Tarozzi	Gerardo Tivani	Tobias Lund Andresen	Team TotalEnergies
5	Miguel Ángel López	Miguel Ángel López	Manuele Tarozzi	Gerardo Tivani	Matthew Riccitello	INEOS Grenadiers
6	Sam Welsford	Miguel Ángel López	Manuele Tarozzi	Gerardo Tivani	Matthew Riccitello	INEOS Grenadiers
7	Sam Welsford	Miguel Ángel López	Manuele Tarozzi	Gerardo Tivani	Matthew Riccitello	INEOS Grenadiers
Final		Miguel Ángel López	Manuele Tarozzi	Gerardo Tivani	Matthew Riccitello	Ineos Grenadiers

== Final classification standings ==
Legend
Denotes the winner of the general classification	Denotes the winner of the mountains classification
Denotes the winner of the sprints classification	Denotes the winner of the young rider classification

=== General classification ===
Final general classification (1–10)
Rank	Rider	Team	Time
1	Miguel Ángel López (COL)	Team Medellín–EPM	25h 40' 57"
2	Filippo Ganna (ITA)	INEOS Grenadiers	+ 30"
3	Sergio Higuita (COL)	Bora–Hansgrohe	+ 44"
4	Einer Rubio (COL)	Movistar Team	+ 50"
5	Brandon Rivera (COL)	INEOS Grenadiers	+ 1' 01"
6	Nicolás Paredes (COL)	Sindicato de Empleados Publicos de San Juan	+ 1' 19"
7	Remco Evenepoel (BEL)	Soudal–Quick-Step	+ 1' 19"
8	Kevin Vermaerke (USA)	Team DSM	+ 1' 30"
9	Matthew Riccitello (USA)	Israel–Premier Tech	+ 1' 41"
10	Quinn Simmons (USA)	Trek–Segafredo	+ 1' 46"

=== Mountains classification ===
Final mountains classification (1–10)
Rank	Rider	Team	Time
1	Manuele Tarozzi (ITA)	Green Project–Bardiani–CSF–Faizanè	24
2	Christofer Jurado (PAN)	Panamá es Cultura y Valores	19
3	Juan Pablo Dotti (ARG)	Sindicato de Empleados Publicos de San Juan	14
4	Miguel Ángel López (COL)	Team Medellín–EPM	10
5	Filippo Ganna (ITA)	INEOS Grenadiers	8
6	Marcos Omar Mendez (ARG)	Argentina	8
7	Sergio Higuita (COL)	Bora–Hansgrohe	6
8	Stefano Gandin (ITA)	Team Corratec	6
9	Emiliano Contreras (ARG)	Chimbas Te Quiero	4
10	Leandro Carlos Messineo (ARG)	Chimbas Te Quiero	4

=== Sprints classification ===
Final sprints classification (1–10)
Rank	Rider	Team	Time
1	Gerardo Tivani (ARG)	Agrupación Virgen de Fátima–San Juan Biker Motos	19
2	Emiliano Contreras (ARG)	Chimbas Te Quiero	9
3	Laureano Rosas (ARG)	Gremios por el Deporte–Cutral Co	7
4	Juan Pablo Dotti (AUS)	Sindicato de Empleados Publicos de San Juan	5
5	Mathias Vacek (CZE)	Trek–Segafredo	5
6	Quinn Simmons (USA)	Trek–Segafredo	3
7	Jens Reynders (BEL)	Israel–Premier Tech	3
8	Óscar Sevilla (ESP)	Team Medellín–EPM	2
9	Manuele Tarozzi (ITA)	Green Project–Bardiani–CSF–Faizanè	2
10	Emiliano Ibarra (ARG)	Gremios por el Deporte–Cutral Co	2

=== Young rider classification ===
Final young rider classification (1–10)
Rank	Rider	Team	Time
1	Matthew Riccitello (USA)	Israel–Premier Tech	25h 42' 38"
2	Quinn Simmons (USA)	Trek–Segafredo	+ 5"
3	Vicente Rojas (CHI)	Chile	+ 31"
4	Mathias Vacek (CZE)	Trek–Segafredo	+ 2' 40"
5	Marco Brenner (GER)	Team DSM	+ 7' 29"
6	Tobias Lund Andresen (DEN)	Team DSM	+ 9' 04"
7	Vinícius Rangel (BRA)	Movistar Team	+ 12' 24"
8	Rodrigo Daniel Díaz (ARG)	Municipalidad de Rawson	+ 19' 42"
9	Hector Exequiel Quintana (CHI)	Chile	+ 26' 52"
10	Iker Bonillo (ESP)	Green Project–Bardiani–CSF–Faizanè	+ 27' 40"

=== Teams classification ===
Final team classification (1–10)
Rank	Team	Time
1	(United Kingdom) INEOS Grenadiers	77h 05' 22"
2	(Spain) Movistar Team	+ 2' 20"
3	(Colombia) Team Medellín–EPM	+ 3' 04"
4	(Belgium) Soudal–Quick-Step	+ 4' 05"
5	(Italy) Green Project–Bardiani–CSF–Faizanè	+ 5' 21"
6	(Kazakhstan) Astana Qazaqstan Team	+ 6' 02"
7	(France) Team TotalEnergies	+ 7' 26"
8	(United States) Trek–Segafredo	+ 7' 32"
9	(Argentina) Sindicato de Empleados Publicos de San Juan	+ 10' 35"
10	(Germany) Bora–Hansgrohe	+ 14' 41"
