= 2020 Vuelta a San Juan =

2020 UCI America Tour 2020 UCI ProSeries

Race details
- Dates: 26 January – 2 February, 2020
- Stages: 7
- Distance: 1,018.5 km (632.9 mi)
- Winning time: 23h 13' 59"

Results
Jersey awarded to the overall winner	Winner	Remco Evenepoel (BEL)	(Deceuninck–Quick-Step)
	Second	Filippo Ganna (ITA)	(Italy)
	Third	Óscar Sevilla (ESP)	(Team Medellín)
Jersey awarded to the mountains classification winner	Mountains	Guillaume Martin (FRA)	(Cofidis)
Jersey awarded to the youth classification winner	Youth	Remco Evenepoel (BEL)	(Deceuninck–Quick-Step)
Jersey awarded to the sprints classification winner	Sprints	Daniel Juarez (ARG)	(Agrupación Virgen de Fátima–SaddleDrunk)
	Team	Movistar Team	

The 2020 Vuelta a San Juan was a road cycling stage race that took place in the San Juan Province of Argentina between 26 January and 2 February 2020. The race is rated as a 2.Pro event as part of the 2020 UCI America Tour and the 2020 UCI ProSeries, and was the 38th edition of the Vuelta a San Juan.

== Teams ==
Twenty-seven teams were invited to the race. Of these teams, six are UCI WorldTour teams, five are UCI Professional Continental teams, nine are UCI Continental teams, and seven are national teams. While the six Argentinean teams (Agrupación Virgen de Fátima–SaddleDrunk, Argentina, Equipo Continental Municipalidad de Pocito, Municipalidad de Rawson, Sindicato de Empleados Publicos de San Juan, and Transportes Puertas de Cuyo) entered seven riders, the other 21 teams submitted six riders, resulting in a starting peloton of 168 riders, of which 155 riders finished the race.

UCI WorldTeams

- Bora–Hansgrohe
- Cofidis
- Deceuninck–Quick-Step
- Israel Start-Up Nation
- Movistar Team
- UAE Team Emirates

UCI Professional Continental Teams

- Androni Giocattoli–Sidermec
- Bardiani–CSF–Faizanè
- Fundación–Orbea
- Rally Cycling
- Vini Zabù–KTM

UCI Continental Teams

- Agrupación Virgen de Fátima–SaddleDrunk
- Amore & Vita–Prodir
- Atum General / Tavira / Maria Nova Hotel
- Colombia Tierra de Atletas–GW Bicicletas
- Team Medellín
- Equipo Continental Municipalidad de Pocito
- Municipalidad de Rawson
- Sindicato de Empleados Publicos de San Juan
- Transportes Puertas de Cuyo

National Teams

- Argentina
- Brazil
- Italy
- Panama
- Peru
- Russia
- Venezuela

== Route ==
Stage characteristics and winners
Stage	Date	Course	Distance	Type	Stage winner
1	January 26	San Juan to San Juan	163.5 km (101.6 mi)	Flat stage	Rudy Barbier (FRA)
2	January 27	Pocito to Pocito	164.7 km (102.3 mi)	Flat stage	Fernando Gaviria (COL)
3	January 28	Ullúm to Punta Negra	15.2 km (9.4 mi)	Individual time trial	Remco Evenepoel (BEL)
4	January 29	San José de Jáchal to Villa San Agustín	185.8 km (115.5 mi)	Hilly stage	Fernando Gaviria (COL)
	January 30			Rest day	
5	January 31	San Martín to Alto Colorado	169.5 km (105.3 mi)	Mountain stage	Miguel Flórez (COL)
6	February 1	Autódromo El Villicúm to Autódromo El Villicúm	174.5 km (108.4 mi)	Hilly stage	Zdeněk Štybar (CZE)
7	February 2	San Juan to San Juan	141.3 km (87.8 mi)	Flat stage	Fernando Gaviria (COL)
Total		1,018.5 km (632.9 mi)			

== Stages ==
=== Stage 1 ===
26 January 2020 — San Juan to San Juan, 163.5 km (101.6 mi)

Stage 1 Result
Rank	Rider	Team	Time
1	Rudy Barbier (FRA)	Israel Start-Up Nation	3h 45' 14"
2	Manuel Belletti (ITA)	Androni Giocattoli–Sidermec	+ 0"
3	Tomas Contte (ARG)	Equipo Continental Municipalidad de Pocito	+ 0"
4	Juan Sebastián Molano (COL)	UAE Team Emirates	+ 0"
5	Álvaro Hodeg (COL)	Deceuninck–Quick-Step	+ 0"
6	Peter Sagan (SVK)	Bora–Hansgrohe	+ 0"
7	Roman Maikin (RUS)	Russia	+ 0"
8	Luca Wackermann (ITA)	Vini Zabù–KTM	+ 0"
9	Fernando Gaviria (COL)	UAE Team Emirates	+ 0"
10	Cyril Lemoine (FRA)	Cofidis	+ 0"

General classification after Stage 1
Rank	Rider	Team	Time
1	Rudy Barbier (FRA)	Israel Start-Up Nation	3h 45' 04"
2	Manuel Belletti (ITA)	Androni Giocattoli–Sidermec	+ 4"
3	Tomas Contte (ARG)	Equipo Continental Municipalidad de Pocito	+ 6"
4	Juan Sebastián Molano (COL)	UAE Team Emirates	+ 10"
5	Álvaro Hodeg (COL)	Deceuninck–Quick-Step	+ 10"
6	Peter Sagan (SVK)	Bora–Hansgrohe	+ 10"
7	Roman Maikin (RUS)	Russia	+ 10"
8	Luca Wackermann (ITA)	Vini Zabù–KTM	+ 10"
9	Fernando Gaviria (COL)	UAE Team Emirates	+ 10"
10	Cyril Lemoine (FRA)	Cofidis	+ 10"

=== Stage 2 ===
27 January 2020 — Pocito to Pocito, 168.7 km (104.8 mi)

Stage 2 Result
Rank	Rider	Team	Time
1	Fernando Gaviria (COL)	UAE Team Emirates	3h 30' 06"
2	Nicolás Naranjo (ARG)	Agrupación Virgen de Fátima–SaddleDrunk	+ 0"
3	Marco Benfatto (ITA)	Bardiani–CSF–Faizanè	+ 0"
4	Piet Allegaert (BEL)	Cofidis	+ 0"
5	Peter Sagan (SVK)	Bora–Hansgrohe	+ 0"
6	Travis McCabe (USA)	Israel Start-Up Nation	+ 0"
7	Mauro Richeze (ARG)	Transportes Puertas de Cuyo	+ 0"
8	Cesar Martingil (POR)	Atum General / Tavira / Maria Nova Hotel	+ 0"
9	Bert Van Lerberghe (BEL)	Deceuninck–Quick-Step	+ 0"
10	Álvaro Hodeg (COL)	Deceuninck–Quick-Step	+ 0"

General classification after Stage 2
Rank	Rider	Team	Time
1	Fernando Gaviria (COL)	UAE Team Emirates	7h 15' 10"
2	Rudy Barbier (FRA)	Israel Start-Up Nation	+ 0"
3	Manuel Belletti (ITA)	Androni Giocattoli–Sidermec	+ 4"
4	Nicolás Naranjo (ARG)	Agrupación Virgen de Fátima–SaddleDrunk	+ 4"
5	Tomas Contte (ARG)	Equipo Continental Municipalidad de Pocito	+ 6"
6	Marco Benfatto (ITA)	Bardiani–CSF–Faizanè	+ 6"
7	Christofer Jurado (PAN)	Panama	+ 9"
8	Peter Sagan (SVK)	Bora–Hansgrohe	+ 10"
9	Álvaro Hodeg (COL)	Deceuninck–Quick-Step	+ 10"
10	Travis McCabe (USA)	Israel Start-Up Nation	+ 10"

=== Stage 3 ===
28 January 2020 — Ullúm to Punta Negra, 15.2 km (9.4 mi) (ITT)

Stage 3 Result
Rank	Rider	Team	Time
1	Remco Evenepoel (BEL)	Deceuninck–Quick-Step	19' 16"
2	Filippo Ganna (ITA)	Italy	+ 32"
3	Óscar Sevilla (ESP)	Team Medellín	+ 1' 08"
4	Nelson Oliveira (POR)	Movistar Team	+ 1' 25"
5	Brandon McNulty (USA)	UAE Team Emirates	+ 1' 26"
6	Maciej Bodnar (POL)	Bora–Hansgrohe	+ 1' 27"
7	Alexander Evtushenko (RUS)	Russia	+ 1' 28"
8	Colin Joyce (USA)	Rally Cycling	+ 1' 40"
9	Matteo Fabbro (ITA)	Bora–Hansgrohe	+ 1' 41"
10	Gavin Mannion (USA)	Rally Cycling	+ 1' 43"

General classification after Stage 3
Rank	Rider	Team	Time
1	Remco Evenepoel (BEL)	Deceuninck–Quick-Step	7h 34' 36"
2	Filippo Ganna (ITA)	Italy	+ 32"
3	Óscar Sevilla (ESP)	Team Medellín	+ 1' 08"
4	Nelson Oliveira (POR)	Movistar Team	+ 1' 25"
5	Brandon McNulty (USA)	UAE Team Emirates	+ 1' 26"
6	Maciej Bodnar (POL)	Bora–Hansgrohe	+ 1' 27"
7	Alexander Evtushenko (RUS)	Russia	+ 1' 28"
8	Colin Joyce (USA)	Rally Cycling	+ 1' 40"
9	Matteo Fabbro (ITA)	Bora–Hansgrohe	+ 1' 41"
10	Gavin Mannion (USA)	Rally Cycling	+ 1' 43"

=== Stage 4 ===
29 January 2020 — San José de Jáchal to Villa San Agustín, 185.8 km (115.5 mi)

Stage 4 Result
Rank	Rider	Team	Time
1	Fernando Gaviria (COL)	UAE Team Emirates	4h 08' 03"
2	Rudy Barbier (FRA)	Israel Start-Up Nation	+ 0"
3	Álvaro Hodeg (COL)	Deceuninck–Quick-Step	+ 0"
4	Peter Sagan (SVK)	Bora–Hansgrohe	+ 0"
5	Piet Allegaert (BEL)	Cofidis	+ 0"
6	Bert Van Lerberghe (BEL)	Deceuninck–Quick-Step	+ 0"
7	Marco Benfatto (ITA)	Bardiani–CSF–Faizanè	+ 0"
8	Manuel Belletti (ITA)	Androni Giocattoli–Sidermec	+ 0"
9	Nicolás Naranjo (ARG)	Agrupación Virgen de Fátima–SaddleDrunk	+ 0"
10	Maximiliano Richeze (ARG)	UAE Team Emirates	+ 0"

General classification after Stage 4
Rank	Rider	Team	Time
1	Remco Evenepoel (BEL)	Deceuninck–Quick-Step	11h 42' 38"
2	Filippo Ganna (ITA)	Italy	+ 33"
3	Óscar Sevilla (ESP)	Team Medellín	+ 1' 09"
4	Nelson Oliveira (POR)	Movistar Team	+ 1' 26"
5	Brandon McNulty (USA)	UAE Team Emirates	+ 1' 27"
6	Maciej Bodnar (POL)	Bora–Hansgrohe	+ 1' 28"
7	Alexander Evtushenko (RUS)	Russia	+ 1' 29"
8	Colin Joyce (USA)	Rally Cycling	+ 1' 41"
9	Matteo Fabbro (ITA)	Bora–Hansgrohe	+ 1' 42"
10	Gavin Mannion (USA)	Rally Cycling	+ 1' 44"

=== Rest day ===
30 January 2020

=== Stage 5 ===
31 January 2020 — San Martín to Alto Colorado, 169.5 km (105.3 mi)

Stage 5 Result
Rank	Rider	Team	Time
1	Miguel Flórez (COL)	Androni Giocattoli–Sidermec	4h 36' 23"
2	Óscar Sevilla (ESP)	Team Medellín	+ 2"
3	Brandon McNulty (USA)	UAE Team Emirates	+ 2"
4	Guillaume Martin (FRA)	Cofidis	+ 4"
5	Remco Evenepoel (BEL)	Deceuninck–Quick-Step	+ 4"
6	Filippo Ganna (ITA)	Italy	+ 4"
7	Nicolás Paredes (COL)	Team Medellín	+ 18"
8	Juan Javier Melivilo (ARG)	Equipo Continental Municipalidad de Pocito	+ 36"
9	Nicolás Tivani (ARG)	Agrupación Virgen de Fátima–SaddleDrunk	+ 36"
10	Nelson Oliveira (POR)	Movistar Team	+ 1' 05"

General classification after Stage 5
Rank	Rider	Team	Time
1	Remco Evenepoel (BEL)	Deceuninck–Quick-Step	16h 19' 05"
2	Filippo Ganna (ITA)	Italy	+ 33"
3	Óscar Sevilla (ESP)	Team Medellín	+ 1' 01"
4	Brandon McNulty (USA)	UAE Team Emirates	+ 1' 21"
5	Miguel Flórez (COL)	Androni Giocattoli–Sidermec	+ 2' 11"
6	Nelson Oliveira (POR)	Movistar Team	+ 2' 27"
7	Guillaume Martin (FRA)	Cofidis	+ 2' 28"
8	Nicolás Paredes (COL)	Team Medellín	+ 2' 36"
9	Gavin Mannion (USA)	Rally Cycling	+ 2' 53"
10	Juan Pablo Dotti (ARG)	Sindicato de Empleados Publicos de San Juan	+ 3' 05"

=== Stage 6 ===
1 February 2020 — Autódromo El Villicúm to Autódromo El Villicúm, 174.5 km (108.4 mi)

Stage 6 Result
Rank	Rider	Team	Time
1	Zdeněk Štybar (CZE)	Deceuninck–Quick-Step	3h 56' 51"
2	Juan Sebastián Molano (COL)	UAE Team Emirates	+ 0"
3	Rudy Barbier (FRA)	Israel Start-Up Nation	+ 0"
4	Manuel Belletti (ITA)	Androni Giocattoli–Sidermec	+ 0"
5	Daniel Oss (ITA)	Bora–Hansgrohe	+ 0"
6	Peter Sagan (SVK)	Bora–Hansgrohe	+ 0"
7	Álvaro Hodeg (COL)	Deceuninck–Quick-Step	+ 0"
8	Nicolás Naranjo (ARG)	Agrupación Virgen de Fátima–SaddleDrunk	+ 0"
9	Nelson Soto (COL)	Colombia Tierra de Atletas–GW Bicicletas	+ 0"
10	Colin Joyce (USA)	Rally Cycling	+ 0"

General classification after Stage 6
Rank	Rider	Team	Time
1	Remco Evenepoel (BEL)	Deceuninck–Quick-Step	20h 15' 56"
2	Filippo Ganna (ITA)	Italy	+ 33"
3	Óscar Sevilla (ESP)	Team Medellín	+ 1' 01"
4	Brandon McNulty (USA)	UAE Team Emirates	+ 1' 21"
5	Miguel Flórez (COL)	Androni Giocattoli–Sidermec	+ 2' 11"
6	Nelson Oliveira (POR)	Movistar Team	+ 2' 27"
7	Guillaume Martin (FRA)	Cofidis	+ 2' 28"
8	Nicolás Paredes (COL)	Team Medellín	+ 2' 36"
9	Gavin Mannion (USA)	Rally Cycling	+ 2' 53"
10	Juan Pablo Dotti (ARG)	Sindicato de Empleados Publicos de San Juan	+ 3' 05"

=== Stage 7 ===
2 February 2020 — San Juan to San Juan, 141.3 km (87.8 mi)

Stage 7 Result
Rank	Rider	Team	Time
1	Fernando Gaviria (COL)	UAE Team Emirates	2h 58' 03"
2	Peter Sagan (SVK)	Bora–Hansgrohe	+ 0"
3	Álvaro Hodeg (COL)	Deceuninck–Quick-Step	+ 0"
4	Manuel Belletti (ITA)	Androni Giocattoli–Sidermec	+ 0"
5	Hugo Hofstetter (FRA)	Israel Start-Up Nation	+ 0"
6	Rudy Barbier (FRA)	Israel Start-Up Nation	+ 0"
7	Davide Appollonio (ITA)	Amore & Vita–Prodir	+ 0"
8	Sebastián Mora (ESP)	Movistar Team	+ 0"
9	Nelson Soto (COL)	Colombia Tierra de Atletas–GW Bicicletas	+ 0"
10	Marco Benfatto (ITA)	Bardiani–CSF–Faizanè	+ 0"

General classification after Stage 7
Rank	Rider	Team	Time
1	Remco Evenepoel (BEL)	Deceuninck–Quick-Step	23h 13' 59"
2	Filippo Ganna (ITA)	Italy	+ 33"
3	Óscar Sevilla (ESP)	Team Medellín	+ 1' 01"
4	Brandon McNulty (USA)	UAE Team Emirates	+ 1' 21"
5	Miguel Flórez (COL)	Androni Giocattoli–Sidermec	+ 2' 11"
6	Nelson Oliveira (POR)	Movistar Team	+ 2' 27"
7	Guillaume Martin (FRA)	Cofidis	+ 2' 28"
8	Nicolás Paredes (COL)	Team Medellín	+ 2' 36"
9	Gavin Mannion (USA)	Rally Cycling	+ 2' 53"
10	Juan Pablo Dotti (ARG)	Sindicato de Empleados Publicos de San Juan	+ 3' 05"

== Classification leadership table ==
Classification leadership by stage
Stage	Winner	General classification	Mountains classification	Sprints classification	Young rider classification	Teams classification
1	Rudy Barbier	Rudy Barbier	Nicolás Paredes	Daniel Juarez	Tomas Contte	Israel Start-Up Nation
2	Fernando Gaviria	Fernando Gaviria	Nicolás Paredes	Daniel Juarez	Tomas Contte	Israel Start-Up Nation
3	Remco Evenepoel	Remco Evenepoel	Nicolás Paredes	Daniel Juarez	Remco Evenepoel	Deceuninck–Quick-Step
4	Fernando Gaviria	Remco Evenepoel	Nicolás Paredes	Daniel Juarez	Remco Evenepoel	Deceuninck–Quick-Step
5	Miguel Flórez	Remco Evenepoel	Guillaume Martin	Daniel Juarez	Remco Evenepoel	Movistar Team
6	Zdeněk Štybar	Remco Evenepoel	Guillaume Martin	Daniel Juarez	Remco Evenepoel	Movistar Team
7	Fernando Gaviria	Remco Evenepoel	Guillaume Martin	Daniel Juarez	Remco Evenepoel	Movistar Team
Final		Remco Evenepoel	Guillaume Martin	Daniel Juarez	Remco Evenepoel	Movistar Team

== Final classification standings ==
Legend
Denotes the leader of the general classification	Denotes the leader of the mountains classification
Denotes the leader of the sprints classification	Denotes the leader of the young rider classification

=== General classification ===
Final general classification (1–10)
Rank	Rider	Team	Time
1	Remco Evenepoel (BEL)	Deceuninck–Quick-Step	23h 13' 59"
2	Filippo Ganna (ITA)	Italy	+ 33"
3	Óscar Sevilla (ESP)	Team Medellín	+ 1' 01"
4	Brandon McNulty (USA)	UAE Team Emirates	+ 1' 21"
5	Miguel Flórez (COL)	Androni Giocattoli–Sidermec	+ 2' 11"
6	Nelson Oliveira (POR)	Movistar Team	+ 2' 27"
7	Guillaume Martin (FRA)	Cofidis	+ 2' 28"
8	Nicolás Paredes (COL)	Team Medellín	+ 2' 36"
9	Gavin Mannion (USA)	Rally Cycling	+ 2' 53"
10	Juan Pablo Dotti (ARG)	Sindicato de Empleados Publicos de San Juan	+ 3' 05"

=== Sprints classification ===
Final sprints classification (1–10)
Rank	Rider	Team	Points
1	Daniel Juarez (ARG)	Agrupación Virgen de Fátima–SaddleDrunk	17
2	Francisco Montes (ARG)	Argentina	9
3	Juan Ignacio Curuchet (ARG)	Argentina	6
4	Agustin Fraysse (ARG)	Argentina	6
5	Christofer Jurado (PAN)	Panama	4
6	Emiliano Contreras (ARG)	Transportes Puertas de Cuyo	4
7	Leonardo Rodriguez (ARG)	Municipalidad de Rawson	4
8	Zdeněk Štybar (CZE)	Deceuninck–Quick-Step	3
9	Robin Carpenter (USA)	Rally Cycling	3
10	Maximiliano Richeze (ARG)	UAE Team Emirates	2

=== Mountains classification ===
Final mountains classification (1–10)
Rank	Rider	Team	Points
1	Guillaume Martin (FRA)	Cofidis	22
2	Nicolás Paredes (COL)	Team Medellín	20
3	Mattia Bais (ITA)	Androni Giocattoli–Sidermec	17
4	Gerardo Atencio (ARG)	Equipo Continental Municipalidad de Pocito	14
5	Brandon McNulty (USA)	UAE Team Emirates	13
6	Remco Evenepoel (BEL)	Deceuninck–Quick-Step	12
7	Óscar Sevilla (ESP)	Team Medellín	11
8	Nelson Soto (COL)	Colombia Tierra de Atletas–GW Bicicletas	11
9	Miguel Flórez (COL)	Androni Giocattoli–Sidermec	10
10	Francisco Montes (ARG)	Argentina	6

=== Young rider classification ===
Final young rider classification (1–10)
Rank	Rider	Team	Time
1	Remco Evenepoel (BEL)	Deceuninck–Quick-Step	23h 13' 59"
2	Brandon McNulty (USA)	UAE Team Emirates	+ 1' 21"
3	Diego Camargo (COL)	Colombia Tierra de Atletas–GW Bicicletas	+ 4' 53"
4	Iñigo Elosegui (ESP)	Movistar Team	+ 4' 56"
5	Vinicius Rangel Costa (BRA)	Brazil	+ 5' 45"
6	Jeisson Casallas (COL)	Colombia Tierra de Atletas–GW Bicicletas	+ 7' 42"
7	Oscar Nehuen Bazan (ARG)	Argentina	+ 8' 31"
8	Leonardo Henrique Finkler (BRA)	Brazil	+ 11' 50"
9	Tomas Contte (ARG)	Equipo Continental Municipalidad de Pocito	+ 25' 08"
10	Renzo Obando (ARG)	Argentina	+ 29' 38"

=== Teams classification ===
Final teams classification (1–10)
Rank	Team	Time
1	Movistar Team	69h 54' 14"
2	Team Medellín	+ 50"
3	Cofidis	+ 1' 17"
4	Androni Giocattoli–Sidermec	+ 3' 38"
5	Bora–Hansgrohe	+ 4' 01"
6	Colombia Tierra de Atletas–GW Bicicletas	+ 4' 10"
7	Venezuela	+ 6' 09"
8	Equipo Continental Municipalidad de Pocito	+ 7' 15"
9	Rally Cycling	+ 7' 35"
10	Agrupación Virgen de Fátima–SaddleDrunk	+ 12' 20"
