= 2015 Tour de San Luis =

2015 UCI America Tour

Race details
- Dates: 18–25 January 2015
- Stages: 7
- Distance: 948.2 km (589.2 mi)
- Winning time: 22h 37' 07"

Results
Jersey awarded to the overall winner	Winner	Daniel Díaz (ARG)	(Carrefour Funvic Soul Cycling Team)
	Second	Rodolfo Torres (COL)	(Colombia)
	Third	Nairo Quintana (COL)	(Movistar Team)
Jersey awarded to the mountains classification winner	Mountains	Rodolfo Torres (COL)	(Colombia)
Jersey awarded to the youth classification winner	Youth	Rodrigo Contreras (COL)	(Colombia (national team))
Jersey awarded to the sprints classification winner	Sprints	Juan Arango (COL)	(Colombia (national team))
	Team	Colombia	

The 2015 Tour de San Luis was the 9th edition of the Tour de San Luis stage race. It was part of the 2015 UCI America Tour, and took place in Argentina between 18 and 25 January 2015. The race was won by Daniel Díaz of the Carrefour Funvic Soul Cycling Team squad, which displayed a dominant performance by winning stages 2, 4 and 6, all of the top mountain finish stages. Another notable performance came from Fernando Gaviria, who won two sprint stages ahead of former world champion Mark Cavendish.

== Teams ==
26 teams were selected to take part in the event. This included six UCI World Tour teams.

- Movistar Team
- San Luis Somos Todos
- AG2R La Mondiale
- Etixx–Quick-Step
- Team Europcar
- Lampre–Merida
- Cannondale–Garmin
- Team Katusha
- Argentina
- Team Novo Nordisk
- Androni Giocattoli
- UnitedHealthcare
- Bretagne–Séché Environnement
- Nippo–Vini Fantini
- Colombia
- Jamis–Hagens Berman
- Buenos Aires Provincia
- Carrefour Funvic Soul Cycling Team
- Inteja–MMR Dominican Cycling Team
- Cycling Academy
- Italy
- Colombia (national team)
- Cuba
- Chile
- Panama
- Sindicato de Empleados Publicos de San Juan

== Schedule ==
The race included seven stages, one of which was a summit finish, one an individual time trial and the others medium mountain stages.

Stage	Date	Course	Type	Distance	Winner
1	19 January	San Luis – Villa Mercedes	Hilly stage	186.8 km (116 mi)	Fernando Gaviria (COL)
2	20 January	La Punta – Mirador del Potrero	Hilly stage	185.3 km (115 mi)	Daniel Díaz (ARG)
3	21 January	Concarán – Juana Koslay	Hilly stage	176.3 km (110 mi)	Fernando Gaviria (COL)
4	22 January	Villa Dolores – Alto El Amago	Mountain stage	142.5 km (89 mi)	Daniel Díaz (ARG)
5	23 January	San Luis – San Luis	Individual time trial	17.4 km (11 mi)	Adriano Malori (ITA)
6	24 January	Achiras – Merlo–Filo Sierras Comechingones	Hilly stage	117.5 km (73 mi)	Kléber Ramos (BRA)
7	25 January	San Luis – San Luis	Hilly stage	122.4 km (76 mi)	Mark Cavendish (GBR)

== Stages ==
=== Stage 1 ===
19 January 2015 — San Luis to Villa Mercedes, 186.8 km (116 mi)

Stage 1 result & General classification after Stage 1
Rank	Rider	Team	Time
1	Fernando Gaviria (COL)	Colombia (national team)	4h 40' 13"
2	Mark Cavendish (GBR)	Etixx–Quick-Step	+ 0"
3	Sacha Modolo (ITA)	Lampre–Merida	+ 0"
4	Nicolas Marini (ITA)	Nippo–Vini Fantini	+ 0"
5	Sebastián Tolosa (ARG)	Buenos Aires Provincia	+ 0"
6	Oscar Gatto (ITA)	Androni Giocattoli	+ 0"
7	Yohann Gène (FRA)	Team Europcar	+ 0"
8	Marco Canola (ITA)	UnitedHealthcare	+ 0"
9	Jakub Mareczko (ITA)	Italy (national team)	+ 0"
10	Armindo Fonseca (FRA)	Bretagne–Séché Environnement	+ 0"

=== Stage 2 ===
20 January 2015 — La Punta to Mirador del Potrero, 185.3 km (115 mi)

Stage 2 result
Rank	Rider	Team	Time
1	Daniel Díaz (ARG)	Carrefour Funvic Soul Cycling Team	4h 33' 26"
2	Rodolfo Torres (COL)	Colombia	+ 6"
3	Kléber Ramos (BRA)	Carrefour Funvic Soul Cycling Team	+ 24"
4	Eduardo Sepúlveda (ARG)	Bretagne–Séché Environnement	+ 27"
5	Daniel Moreno (ESP)	Team Katusha	+ 27"
6	Alex Diniz (BRA)	Carrefour Funvic Soul Cycling Team	+ 27"
7	Nairo Quintana (COL)	Movistar Team	+ 27"
8	Sergio Godoy (ARG)	San Luis Somos Todos	+ 29"
9	Daniel Jaramillo (COL)	Jamis–Hagens Berman	+ 36"
10	Rodrigo Contreras (COL)	Colombia (national team)	+ 36"

General classification after stage 2
Rank	Rider	Team	Time
1	Daniel Díaz (ARG)	Carrefour Funvic Soul Cycling Team	9h 13' 39"
2	Rodolfo Torres (COL)	Colombia	+ 6"
3	Kléber Ramos (BRA)	Carrefour Funvic Soul Cycling Team	+ 24"
4	Daniel Moreno (ESP)	Team Katusha	+ 27"
5	Eduardo Sepúlveda (ARG)	Bretagne–Séché Environnement	+ 27"
6	Alex Diniz (BRA)	Carrefour Funvic Soul Cycling Team	+ 27"
7	Nairo Quintana (COL)	Movistar Team	+ 27"
8	Sergio Godoy (ARG)	San Luis Somos Todos	+ 29"
9	Daniel Jaramillo (COL)	Jamis–Hagens Berman	+ 36"
10	Rodrigo Contreras (COL)	Colombia (national team)	+ 36"

=== Stage 3 ===
21 January 2015 — Concarán to Juana Koslay, 176.3 km (110 mi)

Stage 3 result
Rank	Rider	Team	Time
1	Fernando Gaviria (COL)	Colombia (national team)	3h 48' 44"
2	Mark Cavendish (GBR)	Etixx–Quick-Step	+ 0"
3	Sacha Modolo (ITA)	Lampre–Merida	+ 0"
4	Yauheni Hutarovich (BLR)	Bretagne–Séché Environnement	+ 0"
5	Eduard-Michael Grosu (ROU)	Nippo–Vini Fantini	+ 0"
6	Nicolas Marini (ITA)	Nippo–Vini Fantini	+ 0"
7	Marco Canola (ITA)	UnitedHealthcare	+ 0"
8	Julián Gaday (ARG)	Buenos Aires Provincia	+ 0"
9	Emanuel Guevara (ARG)	San Luis Somos Todos	+ 0"
10	Diego Milán (DOM)	Inteja–MMR Dominican Cycling Team	+ 0"

General classification after stage 3
Rank	Rider	Team	Time
1	Daniel Díaz (ARG)	Carrefour Funvic Soul Cycling Team	13h 02' 23"
2	Rodolfo Torres (COL)	Colombia	+ 6"
3	Kléber Ramos (BRA)	Carrefour Funvic Soul Cycling Team	+ 24"
4	Alex Diniz (BRA)	Carrefour Funvic Soul Cycling Team	+ 27"
5	Eduardo Sepúlveda (ARG)	Bretagne–Séché Environnement	+ 27"
6	Daniel Moreno (ESP)	Team Katusha	+ 27"
7	Nairo Quintana (COL)	Movistar Team	+ 27"
8	Sergio Godoy (ARG)	San Luis Somos Todos	+ 29"
9	Daniel Jaramillo (COL)	Jamis–Hagens Berman	+ 36"
10	Rodrigo Contreras (COL)	Colombia (national team)	+ 36"

=== Stage 4 ===
22 January 2015 — Villa Dolores to Alto El Amago, 142.5 km (89 mi)

Stage 4 result
Rank	Rider	Team	Time
1	Daniel Díaz (ARG)	Carrefour Funvic Soul Cycling Team	3h 29' 25"
2	Alex Diniz (BRA)	Carrefour Funvic Soul Cycling Team	+ 52"
3	Rodolfo Torres (COL)	Colombia	+ 54"
4	Nairo Quintana (COL)	Movistar Team	+ 56"
5	Eduardo Sepúlveda (ARG)	Bretagne–Séché Environnement	+ 1' 19"
6	Rodrigo Contreras (COL)	Colombia (national team)	+ 1' 57"
7	Leandro Messineo (ARG)	San Luis Somos Todos	+ 2' 10"
8	Daniel Moreno (ESP)	Team Katusha	+ 2' 10"
9	Miguel Ángel Rubiano (COL)	Colombia	+ 2' 36"
10	Ilnur Zakarin (RUS)	Team Katusha	+ 2' 47"

General classification after stage 4
Rank	Rider	Team	Time
1	Daniel Díaz (ARG)	Carrefour Funvic Soul Cycling Team	16h 31' 48"
2	Rodolfo Torres (COL)	Colombia	+ 1' 00"
3	Alex Diniz (BRA)	Carrefour Funvic Soul Cycling Team	+ 1' 19"
4	Nairo Quintana (COL)	Movistar Team	+ 1' 23"
5	Eduardo Sepúlveda (ARG)	Bretagne–Séché Environnement	+ 1' 46"
6	Rodrigo Contreras (COL)	Colombia (national team)	+ 2' 33"
7	Daniel Moreno (ESP)	Team Katusha	+ 2' 37"
8	Miguel Ángel Rubiano (COL)	Colombia	+ 3' 33"
9	Daniel Jaramillo (COL)	Jamis–Hagens Berman	+ 3' 58"
10	Leandro Messineo (ARG)	San Luis Somos Todos	+ 4' 04"

=== Stage 5 ===
23 January 2015 — San Luis to San Luis, 17.4 km (11 mi), individual time trial (ITT)

Stage 5 result
Rank	Rider	Team	Time
1	Adriano Malori (ITA)	Movistar Team	20' 07"
2	Michał Kwiatkowski (POL)	Etixx–Quick-Step	+ 4"
3	Hugo Houle (CAN)	AG2R La Mondiale	+ 5"
4	Serghei Țvetcov (ROU)	Androni Giocattoli	+ 29"
5	Leandro Messineo (ARG)	San Luis Somos Todos	+ 32"
6	Ilnur Zakarin (RUS)	Team Katusha	+ 33"
7	Przemysław Niemiec (POL)	Lampre–Merida	+ 34"
8	Carlos Oyarzun (CHI)	Chile (national team)	+ 40"
9	Eduardo Sepúlveda (ARG)	Bretagne–Séché Environnement	+ 42"
10	Daniel Díaz (ARG)	Carrefour Funvic Soul Cycling Team	+ 42"

General classification after stage 5
Rank	Rider	Team	Time
1	Daniel Díaz (ARG)	Carrefour Funvic Soul Cycling Team	16h 52' 37"
2	Rodolfo Torres (COL)	Colombia	+ 1' 09"
3	Nairo Quintana (COL)	Movistar Team	+ 1' 25"
4	Eduardo Sepúlveda (ARG)	Bretagne–Séché Environnement	+ 1' 46"
5	Rodrigo Contreras (COL)	Colombia (national team)	+ 2' 43"
6	Daniel Moreno (ESP)	Team Katusha	+ 3' 15"
7	Leandro Messineo (ARG)	San Luis Somos Todos	+ 3' 54"
8	Ilnur Zakarin (RUS)	Team Katusha	+ 3' 57"
9	Daniel Jaramillo (COL)	Jamis–Hagens Berman	+ 4' 18"
10	Janez Brajkovič (SLO)	UnitedHealthcare	+ 4' 37"

=== Stage 6 ===
24 January 2015 — Achiras to Merlo–Filo Sierras Comechingones, 117.5 km (73 mi)

Stage 6 result
Rank	Rider	Team	Time
1	Kléber Ramos (BRA)	Carrefour Funvic Soul Cycling Team	3h 10' 55"
2	Rodolfo Torres (COL)	Colombia	+ 2"
3	Daniel Díaz (ARG)	Carrefour Funvic Soul Cycling Team	+ 6"
4	Nairo Quintana (COL)	Movistar Team	+ 15"
5	Daniel Moreno (ESP)	Team Katusha	+ 17"
6	Eduardo Sepúlveda (ARG)	Bretagne–Séché Environnement	+ 22"
7	Joe Dombrowski (USA)	Cannondale–Garmin	+ 34"
8	Rodrigo Contreras (COL)	Colombia (national team)	+ 39"
9	Alexis Vuillermoz (FRA)	AG2R La Mondiale	+ 50"
10	Daniel Jaramillo (COL)	Jamis–Hagens Berman	+ 1' 23"

General classification after stage 6
Rank	Rider	Team	Time
1	Daniel Díaz (ARG)	Carrefour Funvic Soul Cycling Team	20h 03' 38"
2	Rodolfo Torres (COL)	Colombia	+ 1' 05"
3	Nairo Quintana (COL)	Movistar Team	+ 1' 34"
4	Eduardo Sepúlveda (ARG)	Bretagne–Séché Environnement	+ 2' 02"
5	Rodrigo Contreras (COL)	Colombia (national team)	+ 3' 16"
6	Daniel Moreno (ESP)	Team Katusha	+ 3' 26"
7	Leandro Messineo (ARG)	San Luis Somos Todos	+ 5' 21"
8	Joe Dombrowski (USA)	Cannondale–Garmin	+ 5' 29"
9	Daniel Jaramillo (COL)	Jamis–Hagens Berman	+ 5' 35"
10	Ilnur Zakarin (RUS)	Team Katusha	+ 5' 39"

=== Stage 7 ===
25 January 2015 — San Luis to San Luis, 122.4 km (76 mi)

Stage 7 result
Rank	Rider	Team	Time
1	Mark Cavendish (GBR)	Etixx–Quick-Step	2h 33' 29"
2	Fernando Gaviria (COL)	Colombia (national team)	+ 0"
3	Jakub Mareczko (ITA)	Italy (national team)	+ 0"
4	Sacha Modolo (ITA)	Lampre–Merida	+ 0"
5	Yauheni Hutarovich (BLR)	Bretagne–Séché Environnement	+ 0"
6	Ken Hanson (USA)	UnitedHealthcare	+ 0"
7	Nicolas Marini (ITA)	Nippo–Vini Fantini	+ 0"
8	Francisco Chamorro (ARG)	Carrefour Funvic Soul Cycling Team	+ 0"
9	Julián Gaday (ARG)	Buenos Aires Provincia	+ 0"
10	Daniel McLay (GBR)	Bretagne–Séché Environnement	+ 0"

Final general classification
Rank	Rider	Team	Time
1	Daniel Díaz (ARG)	Carrefour Funvic Soul Cycling Team	22h 37' 07"
2	Rodolfo Torres (COL)	Colombia	+ 1' 05"
3	Nairo Quintana (COL)	Movistar Team	+ 1' 34"
4	Eduardo Sepúlveda (ARG)	Bretagne–Séché Environnement	+ 2' 02"
5	Rodrigo Contreras (COL)	Colombia (national team)	+ 3' 16"
6	Daniel Moreno (ESP)	Team Katusha	+ 3' 26"
7	Joe Dombrowski (USA)	Cannondale–Garmin	+ 5' 29"
8	Daniel Jaramillo (COL)	Jamis–Hagens Berman	+ 5' 35"
9	Leandro Messineo (ARG)	San Luis Somos Todos	+ 5' 39"
10	Ilnur Zakarin (RUS)	Team Katusha	+ 5' 39"

== Classification leadership table ==
In the 2015 Tour de San Luis, four different jerseys were awarded. For the general classification, calculated by adding each cyclist's finishing times on each stage, the leader received an orange jersey. This classification was considered the most important of the 2015 Tour de San Luis, and the winner of the classification was considered the winner of the race. Additionally, there was a sprints classification, which awarded a green jersey. In the sprints classification, cyclists received points for finishing in the top 3 at intermediate sprint points during each stage, on a 3–2–1 scale.

There was also a mountains classification, the leadership of which was marked by a red jersey. In the mountains classification, points were won by reaching the top of a climb before other cyclists. Each climb was categorised as either first or third-category, with more points available for the higher-categorised climbs. For first-category climbs, points were awarded on a scale of 10 points for first across the climb, second place earned 8 points, third 6, fourth 4, fifth 2 and sixth 1. Third-category climbs awarded points to the top three riders only; 3 points for first across the climb, second place earned 2 points, third place earned 1 point.

The fourth jersey represented the young rider classification, marked by a white jersey. This was decided the same way as the general classification, but only riders born after 1 January 1993 were eligible to be ranked in the classification. Lastly, there was a classification for teams, in which the times of the best three cyclists per team on each stage were added together; the leading team at the end of the race was the team with the lowest total time.

Stage	Winner	General classification	Sprints classification	Mountains classification	Young rider classification	Team classification
1	Fernando Gaviria	Fernando Gaviria	Leandro Messineo	Kléber Ramos	Fernando Gaviria	Bretagne–Séché Environnement
2	Daniel Díaz	Daniel Díaz	Leandro Messineo	Daniel Díaz	Rodrigo Contreras	Carrefour Funvic Soul Cycling Team
3	Fernando Gaviria	Daniel Díaz	Leandro Messineo	Daniel Díaz	Rodrigo Contreras	Carrefour Funvic Soul Cycling Team
4	Daniel Díaz	Daniel Díaz	Leandro Messineo	Daniel Díaz	Rodrigo Contreras	Colombia
5	Adriano Malori	Daniel Díaz	Leandro Messineo	Daniel Díaz	Rodrigo Contreras	Colombia
6	Kléber Ramos	Daniel Díaz	Juan Arango	Daniel Díaz	Rodrigo Contreras	Colombia
7	Mark Cavendish	Daniel Díaz	Juan Arango	Rodolfo Torres	Rodrigo Contreras	Colombia
Final		Daniel Díaz	Juan Arango	Rodolfo Torres	Rodrigo Contreras	Colombia
