= Messineo =

Messineo is a surname. Notable people with the surname include:

- Leandro Messineo (born 1979), Argentine cyclist
- Michael Messineo (born 1995), better known as Mike's Mic, Australian YouTuber
