= Emiliano Ibarra =

Argentine cyclist

Personal information
- Full name: Emiliano David Ibarra
- Born: 20 January 1982 (age 44) Carcarañá, Argentina

Cycling career
- Sport: Cycling
- Current team: Gremios por el Deporte–Cutral Co
- Discipline: Road
- Role: Rider
- Rider type: Time trialist

Amateur team
- 2021: Transportes Puertas de Cuyo

Professional teams
- 2016–2019: Sindicato de Empleados Publicos de San Juan
- 2020: Transportes Puertas de Cuyo
- 2022: Chimbas Te Quiero
- 2023–: Gremios por el Deporte–Cutral Co

Emiliano David Ibarra (born 20 January 1982 in Carcarañá) is an Argentine cyclist, who currently rides for UCI Continental team Gremios por el Deporte–Cutral Co.

== Major results ==
2016
2nd Time trial, National Road Championships
2017
2nd Time trial, National Road Championships
2018
1st Time trial, National Road Championships
5th Time trial, Pan American Road Championships
2019
2nd Time trial, National Road Championships
2022
4th Time trial, National Road Championships
2023
7th Overall Giro del Sol

1st Stage 1
