= Monton Sports =

Chinese sports equipment company

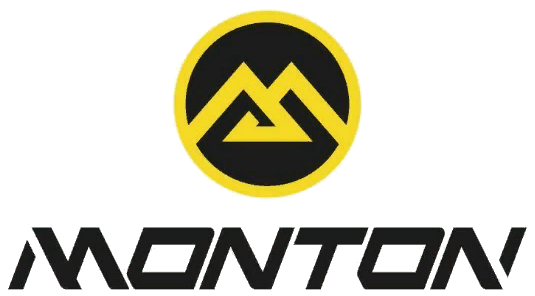
- Type: Private
- Industry: Sports equipment
- Founded: 2009; 17 years ago
- Founder: Cai Jianxiong
- Headquarters: Guangzhou, China
- Products: Sportswear, accessories
- Website: montonsports.com

Monton Sports is a Chinese sports equipment manufacturing company headquartered in Guangdong. The company, focused on road bicycle racing products, has additional offices in Taichung, Madrid, Pahang, North Carolina, Bangkok, and Slovakia.

Sportswear manufactured and commercialised by Monton include jerseys, jackets, shorts, and t-shirts, as well as helmets, socks, gloves, caps, water bottles, among other products.

== History ==
Started in Guangzhou in early 2009 by Cai Jianxiong, the first products launched in June of that year. The name MONTON was taken from the words Mountain, promoting the green life of cycling.

In 2012, Monton partnered with a Taiwan designer who is also a cyclist to create a range of fashionable cycling clothing and accessories.

== Sponsorships ==
In 2015, Monton has sponsored 6th Tour of Poyang Lake, bike race which 22 teams, 179 cyclists had taken part in.

In 2016, Monton has sponsored three UCI continental cycling teams with custom cycling clothing:

- Sindicato de Empleados Publicos de San Juan in Argentina
- Terengganu Cycling Team in Malaysia
- Dukla Banská Bystrica cycling team in Slovakia

In 2016, Monton has been the exclusive clothing supplier of Tour of China bike race.
