= Sergio Godoy =

Sergio Godoy may refer to:

- Sergio Godoy (Guatemalan cyclist) (born 1973)
- Sergio Godoy (Argentine cyclist) (born 1988)
- Marcus Sergio Godoy (1881–1957), bishop of Maracaibo

== See also ==
- Sergio Cortés (Sergio Cortés Godoy, born 1968), Chilean tennis player
