= Jorge Pi =

Argentine bicycle racer

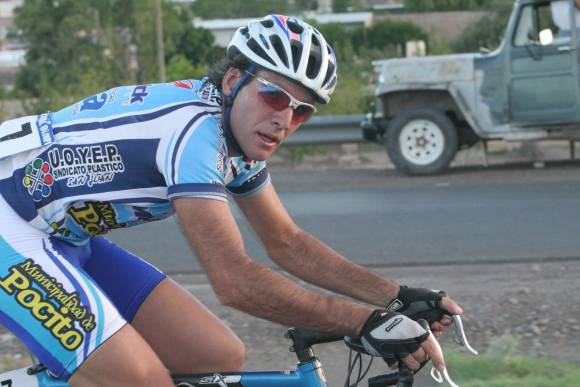

Personal information
- Full name: Jorge Antonio Pi
- Born: 16 October 1984 (age 42) Villa Aberastain, Argentina

Cycling career
- Sport: Cycling
- Discipline: Road
- Role: Rider

Amateur team
- 2010–2011: Los Mineros

Professional team
- 2018: Asociación Civil Mardan

Jorge Antonio Pi (born 16 October 1984 in Villa Aberastain) is an Argentine cyclist, who last rode for UCI Continental team Asociación Civil Mardan.

== Major results ==
2004
1st Time trial, National Under-23 Road Championships
2005
3rd Time trial, National Under-23 Road Championships
2006
1st Overall Giro del Sol San Juan
2010
1st Road race, National Road Championships
