= Nicolás Paredes =

Colombian cyclist

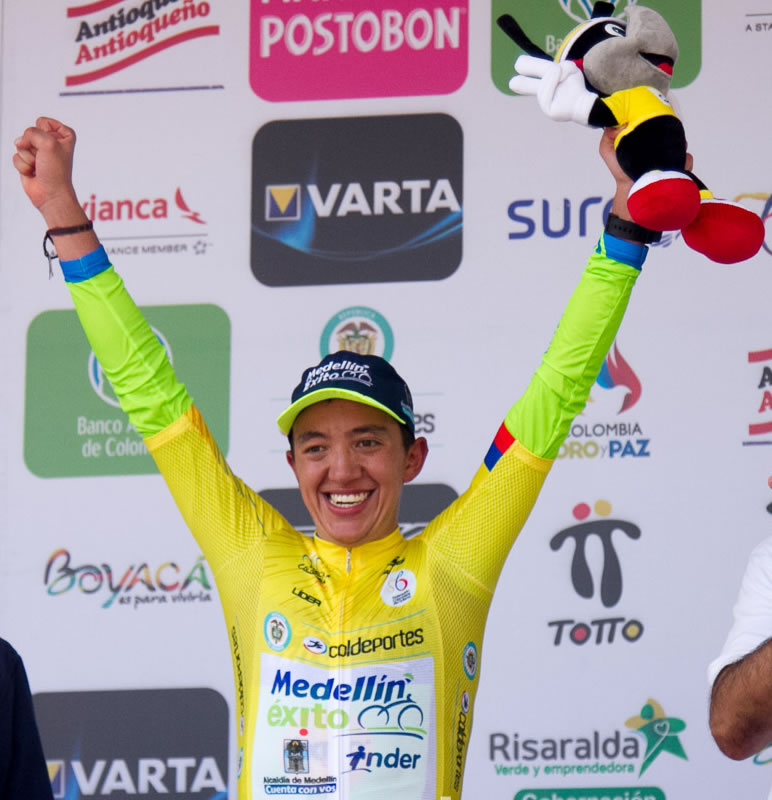
- Paredes in 2017

Personal information
- Full name: César Nicolás Paredes Avellaneda
- Born: 5 September 1992 (age 34) Bogotá, Colombia

Cycling career
- Sport: Cycling
- Current team: Sindicato de Empleados Publicos de San Juan
- Discipline: Road
- Role: Rider
- Rider type: Climber

Amateur team
- 2015: Formesán–Bogotá Humana

Professional teams
- 2013–2014: 4-72 Colombia
- 2016: Strongman–Campagnolo–Wilier
- 2017–2020: Medellín–Inder
- 2021: Louletano–Loulé Concelho
- 2022–: Sindicato de Empleados Publicos de San Juan

César Nicolás Paredes Avellaneda (born 5 September 1992) is a Colombian cyclist, who currently rides for UCI Continental team Sindicato de Empleados Publicos de San Juan.

== Major results ==
2016
2nd Overall Vuelta a Chiriquí
9th Overall Vuelta a Costa Rica
2017
1st Overall Vuelta Ciclista de Chile
2018
1st Overall Vuelta Michoacán
2019
7th Overall Vuelta a San Juan
2020
8th Overall Vuelta a San Juan
2023
6th Overall Vuelta a San Juan
