= Fernando Gaviria =

Colombian road racing cyclist

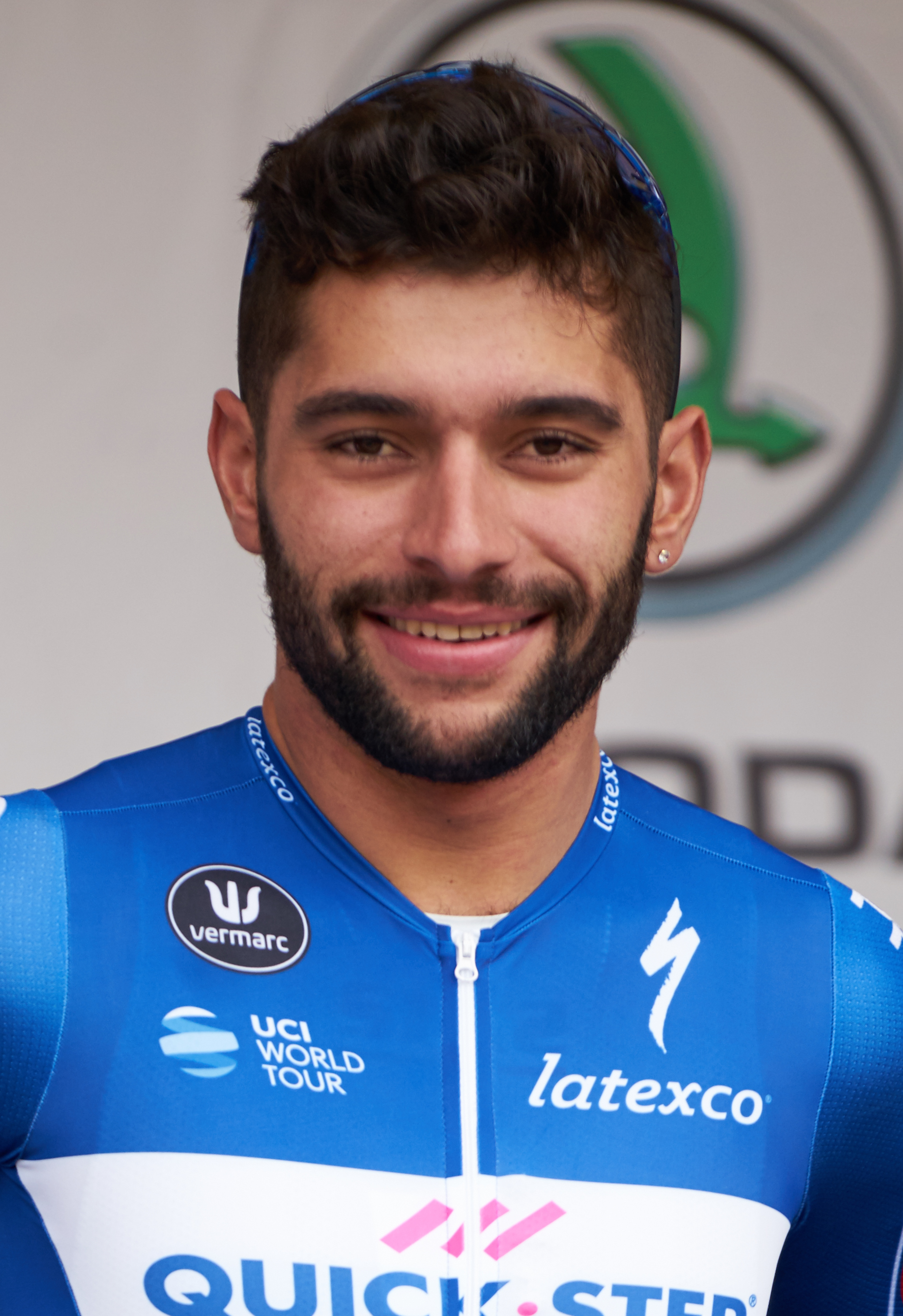
- Gaviria at the 2018 Münsterland Giro

Personal information
- Full name: Fernando Gaviria Rendón
- Born: 19 August 1994 (age 32) La Ceja, Antioquia, Colombia
- Height: 1.80 m (5 ft 11 in)
- Weight: 71 kg (157 lb)

Cycling career
- Sport: Cycling
- Current team: Caja Rural–Seguros RGA
- Disciplines: Road; Track
- Role: Rider
- Rider type: Sprinter

Amateur team
- 2013–2015: Colombia–Coldeportes

Professional teams
- → 2015: Etixx–Quick-Step (stagiaire)
- 2016–2018: Etixx–Quick-Step
- 2019–2022: UAE Team Emirates
- 2023–2025: Movistar Team
- 2026–: Caja Rural–Seguros RGA

Major wins
- Road Grand Tours Tour de France 2 individual stages (2018) Giro d'Italia Points classification (2017) 5 individual stages (2017, 2019) One-day races and Classics GP Impanis-Van Petegem (2016) Paris–Tours (2016) Track World Championships Omnium (2015, 2016)
Medal record
Representing Colombia
Men's track cycling
Event	1st	2nd	3rd
World Championships	2	0	0
World Junior Championships	2	0	0
World Cup stage	1	0	0
Pan American Games	2	0	0
Pan American Championships	1	5	0
CAC Games	1	0	0
South American Games	1	0	0
Bolivarian Games	2	0	0
Total	12	5	0
World Championships
Gold medal – first place	2015 Yvelines	Omnium
Gold medal – first place	2016 London	Omnium
Pan American Games
Gold medal – first place	2015 Toronto	Omnium
Gold medal – first place	2015 Toronto	Team pursuit
Pan American Championships
Gold medal – first place	2013 Mexico City	Omnium
Silver medal – second place	2013 Mexico City	Team pursuit
Silver medal – second place	2023 San Juan	Elimination
Silver medal – second place	2023 San Juan	Omnium
Silver medal – second place	2023 San Juan	Madison
Silver medal – second place	2023 San Juan	Team pursuit
Central American and Caribbean Games
Gold medal – first place	2014 Veracruz	Omnium
South American Games
Gold medal – first place	2014 Santiago	Omnium
Bolivarian Games
Gold medal – first place	2013 Trujillo	Omnium
Gold medal – first place	2013 Trujillo	Madison
World Junior Championships
Gold medal – first place	2012 Invercargill	Omnium
Gold medal – first place	2012 Invercargill	Madison
Men's road cycling
Event	1st	2nd	3rd
Pan American Championships	1	0	0
CAC Games	0	1	0
Bolivarian Games	1	0	0
Total	2	1	0
Pan American Championships
Gold medal – first place	2014 Puebla	Under-23 road race
Central American and Caribbean Games
Silver medal – second place	2014 Veracruz	Time trial
Bolivarian Games
Gold medal – first place	2013 Trujillo	Road race

Fernando Gaviria Rendón (born 19 August 1994) is a Colombian professional road and track racing cyclist, who currently rides for UCI ProTeam Caja Rural–Seguros RGA. He is well known as a sprinter. Riding for the Colombian national cycling team, Gaviria came to international attention at the 2015 Tour de San Luis, where he beat former world champion Mark Cavendish in two sprint finishes. His first major Grand Tour wins came at the 2017 Giro d'Italia. He is the brother of track cyclist Juliana Gaviria. His nickname is "Quetzal splendente", from the brightful and colourful South American bird Quetzal. Its colours recall his world championship titles, his Colombia and "la maglia Ciclamino" won at Giro d'Italia.

== Career ==
=== Early career ===
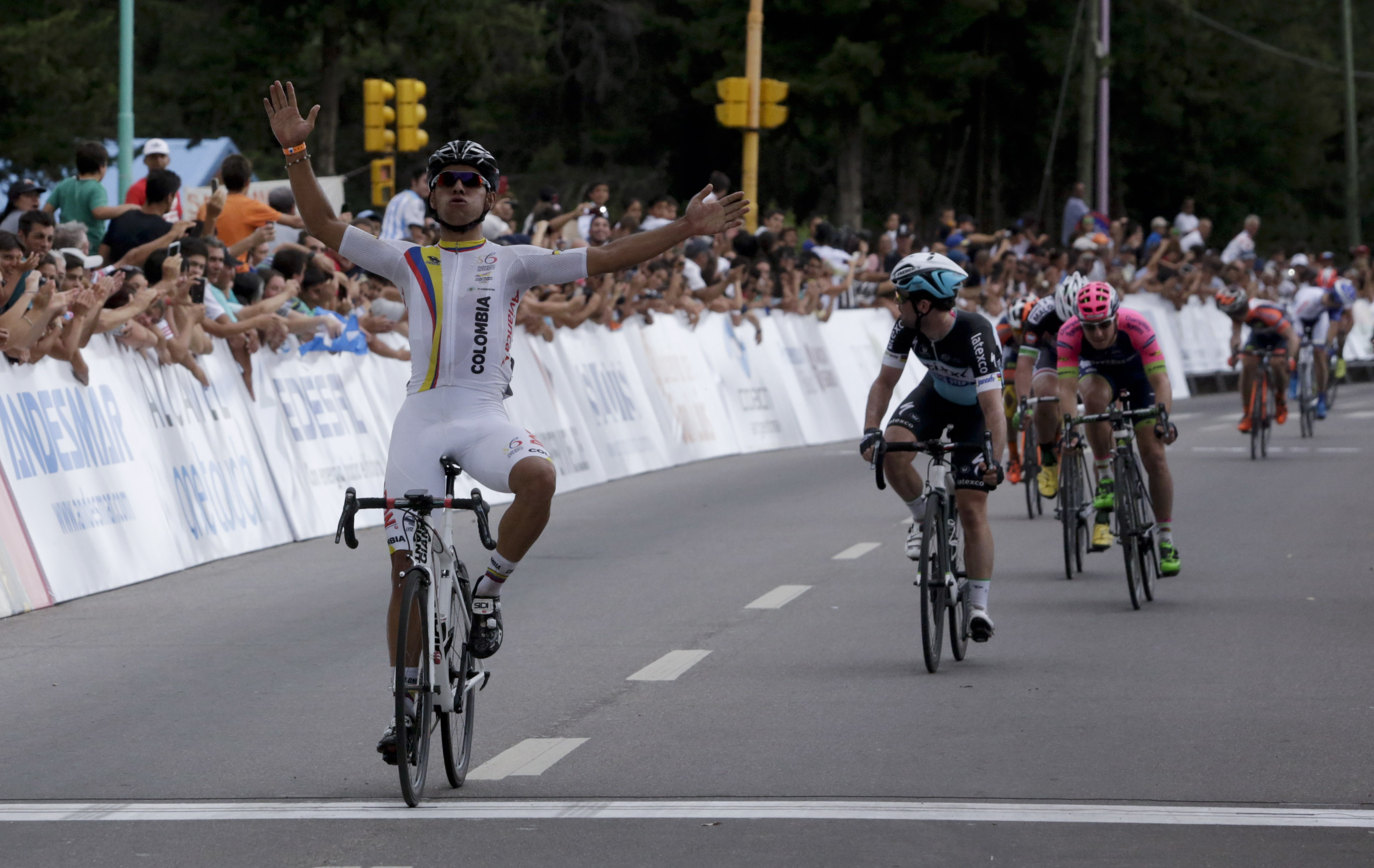
Gaviria taking a sprint victory at the 2015 Tour de San Luis

Before his road career, Gaviria won the omnium and madison events at the 2012 UCI Juniors Track World Championships. In 2014, he won the under-23 Pan-American road race. He also competed in the 2014 Tour de l'Avenir. Although he did not win a stage, he won the bunch sprint behind the breakaway on the first stage and ended the race second in the points competition. Later that year he won the omnium in the London round of the 2014–15 UCI Track Cycling World Cup.

Gaviria's first major road cycling winning streak started in January 2015 at the Tour de San Luis, one of the major early-season cycling races. He won a surprise victory in the first stage of the race, opening his sprint early and beating 2011 world champion Mark Cavendish of the Etixx–Quick-Step team into second place. Cavendish said after the race that he had not heard of Gaviria before the race. Gaviria then won the third stage of the race, again beating Cavendish into second place. Cavendish won the final stage of the event, with Gaviria finishing a close second.

Following these high-profile victories, there were reports that several UCI World Tour teams were seeking to sign Gaviria, including AG2R La Mondiale, though he committed his 2015 season to riding with the Colombian national team. Later reports suggested that his most likely 2016 team was Cavendish's own Etixx–Quick-Step team. It was also revealed that Gaviria had been recommended in 2014 to Patrick Lefevere, the manager of Etixx–Quick-Step, but the team declined to sign him. Following Gaviria's success at the Tour de San Luis, Lefevere called this a "mistake". In February 2015, Lefevere announced that Gaviria would be undergoing tests with Etixx–Quick-Step after the UCI Track Cycling World Championships, a further move towards a contract for 2016. Lefevere also said that such a contract would not prevent Gaviria competing in the 2016 Summer Olympics. Following these tests, Gaviria signed a contract for 2016 with Etixx–Quick-Step, along with fellow Colombian Rodrigo Contreras. Gaviria's plans to ride in the 2016 Olympic Games were affirmed by Lefevere; he also suggested that Gaviria might ride as a stagiaire for the team during 2015.

In February 2015, Gaviria competed for Colombia in the track World Championships in the omnium competition. Although he won none of the six events, he was consistent throughout. In the concluding points race, he was able to gain an early lap on the field, giving him a large advantage; he was then able to mark his closest rival, Elia Viviani, and secured a comfortable overall victory to win the rainbow jersey.

=== Etixx–Quick-Step (2015–2018) ===
Gaviria made his debut for Etixx–Quick-Step as a stagiaire in August 2015 at the RideLondon–Surrey Classic. He finished in eighth position, the highest-placed Etixx–Quick-Step rider. His next race for the team was in the Czech Cycling Tour, where Etixx–Quick-Step won the first stage, a team time trial. The following day Gaviria won his first individual stage victory for the team, winning a reduced bunch sprint. After this race, it was the Tour of Britain, where Gaviria managed to take one stage win ahead of several world class sprinters including André Greipel and Elia Viviani.

2016 began almost as strongly as the previous season. He won the Team Time Trial with Etixx–Quick-Step and also took another stage at the Tour de San Luis. He crashed out later in the race preventing another victory. In February he won a stage and the points classification at the new race Tour La Provence. In early March he became the first rider to win two gold medals in the Omnium at the Track Cycling World Championships by defending his title from the previous year. He won stage 3 of Tirreno–Adriatico, his first victory at World Tour level.

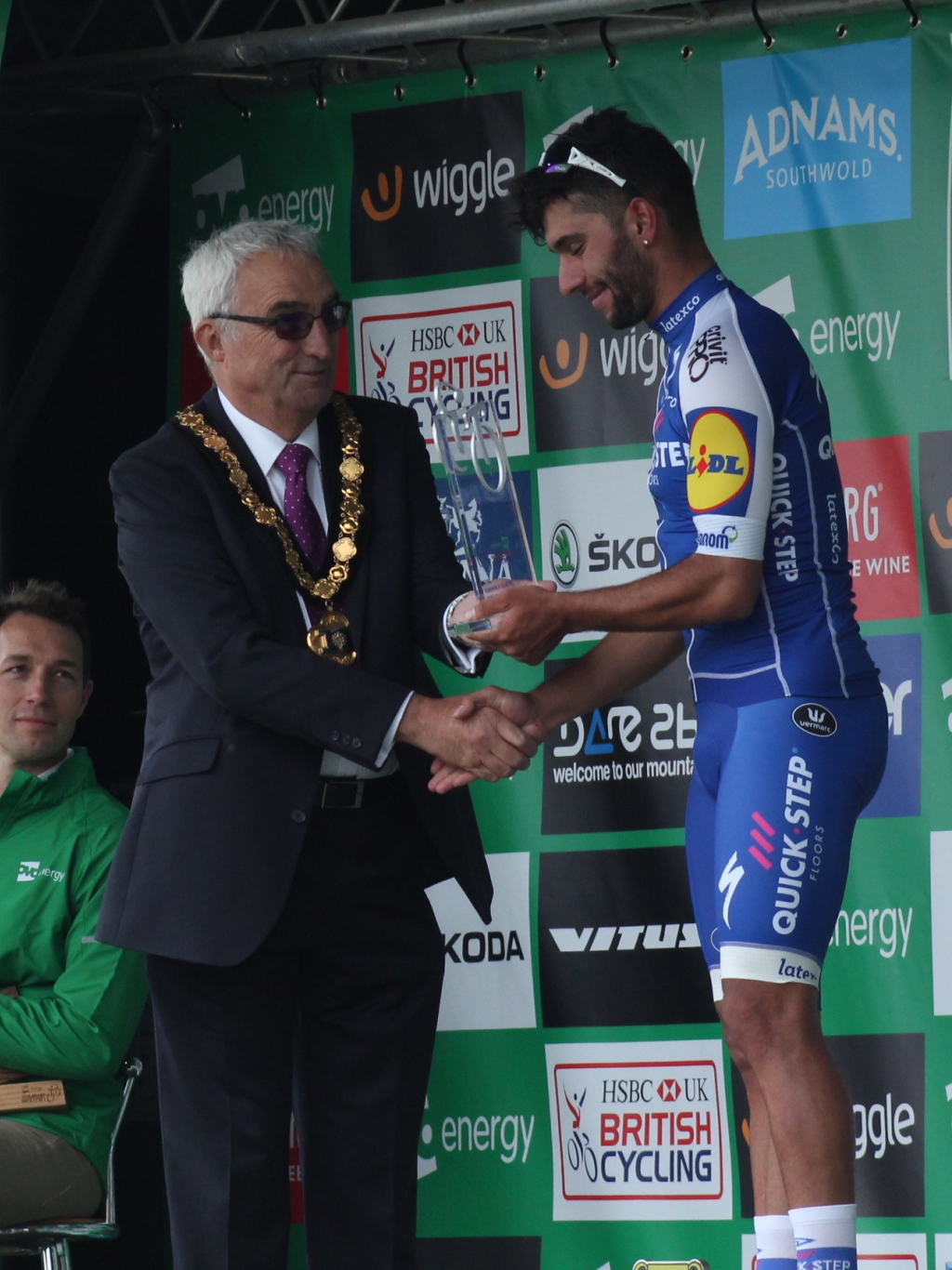
Gaviria after winning Stage 4 of the 2017 Tour of Britain

In 2017, he was named in the start list for the Giro d'Italia and won Stage 3 from Tortolì to Cagliari in a sprint finish, taking the lead in the general classification in the process. He achieved further success by winning Stages 5, 12 and 13 in bunch sprints, making him the first Colombian to win four stages in a single Giro d'Italia. In July 2018, he was named in the start list for the Tour de France. Gaviria won stage 1 of the Tour de France, starting Day 2 in the Yellow Jersey. Gaviria and other major sprinters such as André Greipel and Dylan Groenewegen were unable to finish stage 11 which was the third major hilly alps stage within the time limit and were eliminated. Gaviria suffered a broken collarbone at the Tour of Turkey and was forced to abandon, ending his 2018 campaign.

=== UAE Team Emirates (2019–2022) ===
Shortly after his injury at the Tour of Turkey, it was announced that Gaviria was joining the UAE Team Emirates team on a three-year contract from the 2019 season. In his first season with the team, he won the third stage of the Giro d'Italia, his fifth win total in the race. Earlier that season, he won a stage of the UAE Tour, and ended the year with two more wins at the Tour of Guangxi.

Gaviria won six more races in 2020, including the Giro della Toscana one-day race. In 2021, he only saw one victory: stage three of the Tour de Pologne.

Gaviria started 2022 in the Middle East, winning two stages and the points classification of the Tour of Oman. Three months later, he finished second at Eschborn–Frankfurt before going on to compete in the Giro d'Italia. Here, he finished second on two stages, third on one and second in the points classification. At the end of the season, he obtained no notable results and was criticized by Joxean Fernández, the manager of UAE Team Emirates, who questioned his "focus and motivation".

=== Movistar Team (2023–2025) ===
For the 2023 season, Gaviria joined Movistar Team on a one-year contract, bringing home two stage wins in his initial season, one at the Tour de Romandie and one at the Vuelta a San Juan. He started off 2024 with a win on day one of the Tour Colombia, later placing second on stage four.

In November 2025, Gaviria was handed a suspended prison sentence for driving whilst intoxicated in Monaco.

=== Caja Rural–Seguros RGA (2026–) ===
After Movistar did not renew Gaviria's contract, Caja Rural "offered Gaviria a lifeline to continue his career".

== Major results ==
=== Road ===
2012
1st Time trial, National Junior Championships
2013
1st Road race, Bolivarian Games
2014
1st Road race, Pan American Under-23 Championships
Central American and Caribbean Games

2nd Time trial
4th Road race

2015 (4 pro wins)
Tour de San Luis

1st Stages 1 & 3

Czech Cycling Tour

1st Stages 1 (TTT) & 2

1st Stage 4 Tour of Britain
Pan American Games

8th Time trial
9th Road race

8th RideLondon–Surrey Classic
2016 (7)
1st Paris–Tours
1st Grand Prix Impanis-Van Petegem
Tour La Provence

1st Points classification
1st Stage 3

Tour de Pologne

1st Stages 2 & 4

Tour de San Luis

1st Stages 1 (TTT) & 2

1st Stage 3 Tirreno–Adriatico
2nd Gran Piemonte
2nd Kampioenschap van Vlaanderen
6th Gent–Wevelgem
7th Halle–Ingooigem
10th Dwars door Vlaanderen
2017 (14)
1st Kampioenschap van Vlaanderen
Giro d'Italia

1st Points classification
1st Stages 3, 5, 12 & 13
Held & after Stage 3

Tour of Guangxi

1st Points classification
1st Stages 1, 2, 3 & 6

Vuelta a San Juan

1st Stages 1 & 4

1st Stage 6 Tirreno–Adriatico
1st Stage 1 Volta ao Algarve
1st Stage 4 Tour of Britain
4th Primus Classic
5th Milan–San Remo
8th Road race, UCI World Championships
9th Gent–Wevelgem
2018 (9)
Tour de France

1st Stages 1 & 4
Held & after Stage 1
Held after Stages 1–2

Tour of California

1st Points classification
1st Stages 1, 5 & 7

Colombia Oro y Paz

1st Points classification
1st Stages 1, 2 & 3

1st Stage 1 Vuelta a San Juan
2019 (6)
Giro d'Italia

1st Stage 3
Held after Stage 3

Tour of Guangxi

1st Stages 1 & 5

Vuelta a San Juan

1st Stages 1 & 4

1st Stage 2 UAE Tour
2nd Three Days of Bruges–De Panne
4th Münsterland Giro
2020 (6)
1st Giro della Toscana
Vuelta a San Juan

1st Stages 2, 4 & 7

1st Stage 2 Vuelta a Burgos
1st Stage 2 Tour du Limousin
7th Milano–Torino
2021 (1)
1st Stage 3 Tour de Pologne
3rd Grand Prix de Fourmies
10th Brussels Cycling Classic
2022 (2)
Tour of Oman

1st Points classification
1st Stages 1 & 6

2nd Eschborn–Frankfurt
2023 (2)
1st Stage 5 Tour de Romandie
1st Stage 4 Vuelta a San Juan
2nd Milano–Torino
7th Clásica de Almería
2024 (1)
1st Stage 1 Tour Colombia
2025
5th Trofeo Ses Salines
9th Omloop van het Houtland
2026
2nd Ronde van Limburg
10th Clásica de Almería

==== Grand Tour general classification results timeline ====
Grand Tour	2017	2018	2019	2020	2021	2022	2023	2024	2025	2026
Giro d'Italia	129	—	DNF	DNF	109	128	118	137	—	—
Tour de France	—	DNF	—	—	—	—	—	DNF	—	IP
Vuelta a España	—	—	147	—	—	—	—	—	—	—

==== Classic results timeline ====
Monument	2015	2016	2017	2018	2019	2020	2021	2022	2023	2024
Milan–San Remo	—	79	5	—	16	91	113	—	129	—
Tour of Flanders	—	—	—	—	78	—	—	—	—	—
Paris–Roubaix	—	—	—	—	—	—	NH	DNF	—	—
Liège–Bastogne–Liège	Has not contested during his career									
Giro di Lombardia	Has not contested during his career									
Classic	2015	2016	2017	2018	2019	2020	2021	2022	2023	2024
Milano–Torino	—	—	—	—	—	7	—	—	2	—
Brugge–De Panne	Previously stage race			—	2	—	14	—	DNF	14
Gent–Wevelgem	—	6	9	—	21	—	—	—	DNF	DNF
Dwars door Vlaanderen	—	10	90	—	22	NH	—	—	92	—
Eschborn–Frankfurt	NH	—	DNF	25	—	NH	—	—	2	—
Paris–Tours	—	1	28	—	—	—	—	DNF	—	

Legend
—	Did not compete
DNF	Did not finish
IP	In progress

=== Track ===
2012
UCI World Junior Championships

1st Omnium
1st Madison (with Jordan Parra)

2013
Pan American Championships

1st Omnium
2nd Team pursuit

Bolivarian Games

1st Omnium
1st Madison (with Juan Arango)

2nd Omnium, National Championships
2014
1st Omnium, Central American and Caribbean Games
1st Omnium, South American Games
1st Omnium, UCI World Cup, London
2015
Pan American Games

1st Omnium
1st Team pursuit

1st Omnium, UCI World Championships
2016
1st Omnium, UCI World Championships
2019
Torneo Internacional de Pista de Cali

1st Madison (with Juan Arango)
2nd Omnium

2023
Pan American Championships

2nd Omnium
2nd Madison (with Juan Arango)
2nd Team pursuit
2nd Elimination
