= Juan Brunetta =

Juan Brunetta may refer to:

- Juan Guillermo Brunetta (born 1975), Argentine cyclist
- Juan Brunetta (footballer) (born 1997), Argentine footballer
