= Miguel Flórez =

Colombian bicycle racer

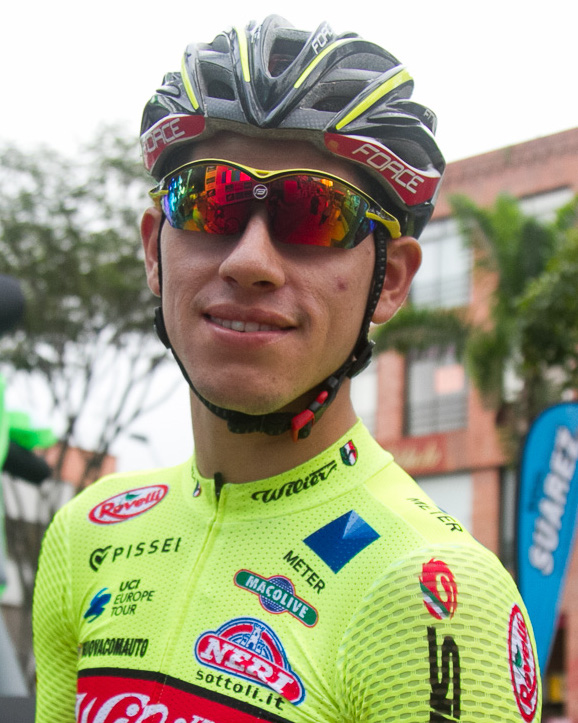
- Flórez in 2018.

Personal information
- Full name: Miguel Eduardo Flórez López
- Born: 21 February 1996 (age 30) Bogotá, Colombia
- Height: 1.74 m (5 ft 9 in)
- Weight: 57 kg (126 lb)

Cycling career
- Sport: Cycling
- Current team: Team Banco Guayaquil–Bianchi
- Discipline: Road
- Role: Rider

Professional teams
- 2016: Boyacá Raza de Campeones
- 2017–2018: Wilier Triestina–Selle Italia
- 2019–2020: Androni Giocattoli–Sidermec
- 2021–2022: Arkéa–Samsic
- 2023: GW Shimano–Sidermec
- 2024–: Team Banco Guayaquil–Bianchi

Miguel Eduardo Flórez López (born 21 February 1996) is a Colombian cyclist, who currently rides for UCI Continental team Team Banco Guayaquil–Bianchi. In May 2019, he was named in the startlist for the 2019 Giro d'Italia.

== Major results ==
2016
1st Stage 3 Volta a Portugal do Futuro
8th Overall Vuelta a la Independencia Nacional
2019
5th Overall Vuelta al Tachira

1st Stage 8

2020
5th Overall Vuelta a San Juan

1st Stage 5

5th Overall Tour Colombia
10th Circuito de Getxo

2023
3rd Circuito Ciclístico Jenesano

=== Grand Tour general classification results timeline ===
Grand Tour	2019
Giro d'Italia	72
Tour de France	—
Vuelta a España	—
