= Valeria Müller =

Argentine cyclist

Valeria Muller
Personal information
- Full name: Valeria Teresita Muller
- Born: 13 August 1974 (age 52) Argentina

Cycling career
- Sport: Cycling
- Discipline: Road
- Role: Rider
- Rider type: Time trialist

Amateur team
- 2015: Acimproba–Orbai
Medal record
Women's road bicycle racing
Representing Argentina
Pan American Championships
Bronze medal – third place	2009 Hidalgo	Time trial

Valeria Teresita Muller (born 13 May 1974) is a road cyclist from Argentina. She participated at the 2010 UCI Road World Championships and 2011 UCI Road World Championships. She is a twelve-time winner of the Argentine National Time Trial Championships.

== Major results ==
2000
National Road Championships

1st Time trial
3rd Road race

2001
1st Time trial, National Road Championships
2002
1st Time trial, National Road Championships
2004
2nd Time trial, National Road Championships
2005
National Road Championships

1st Time trial
3rd Road race

2006
2nd Time trial, National Road Championships
2007
2nd Time trial, National Road Championships
2008
National Road Championships

1st Time trial
2nd Road race

6th Time trial, Pan American Road Championships
2009
1st Time trial, National Road Championships
2010
1st Time trial, National Road Championships
2011
1st Time trial, National Road Championships
4th Time trial, Pan American Road Championships
10th Time trial, Pan American Games
2012
1st Time trial, National Road Championships
5th Time trial, Pan American Road Championships
2014
National Road Championships

1st Time trial
1st Road race

2015
1st Time trial, National Road Championships
9th Overall Tour Femenino de San Luis
2016
3rd Time trial, National Road Championships
2017
1st Time trial, National Road Championships
10th Time trial, Pan American Road Championships
2019
National Road Championships

2nd Time trial
3rd Road race
