= Alejandro Durán (cyclist) =

Argentine cyclist

Personal information
- Full name: Alejandro Antonio Durán
- Born: 25 March 1991 (age 35) Guaymallén, Mendoza Province, Argentina

Cycling career
- Sport: Cycling
- Current team: Chimbas Te Quiero
- Discipline: Road
- Role: Rider
- Rider type: Time trialist

Amateur teams
- 2015–2017: Shania
- 2018–2019: Municipalidad de Godoy Cruz

Professional teams
- 2020–2021: Sindicato de Empleados Publicos de San Juan
- 2022–: Chimbas Te Quiero
Medal record
Men's road bicycle racing
Representing Argentina
Pan American Championships
Bronze medal – third place	2015 León	Time trial

Alejandro Antonio Durán (born 25 March 1991) is an Argentine professional racing cyclist, who currently rides for UCI Continental team Chimbas Te Quiero.

== Major results ==
2011
3rd Road race, National Junior Road Championships
2015
1st Time trial, National Road Championships
3rd Time trial, Pan American Road Championships
2016
6th Time trial, Pan American Road Championships
2017
5th Time trial, National Road Championships
2018
3rd Time trial, National Road Championships
2019
3rd Time trial, National Road Championships
2021
2nd Time trial, National Road Championships
2022
1st Time trial, National Road Championships
6th Time trial, Pan American Road Championships
