= Venezuelan Cycling Federation =

National governing body of cycle racing in Venezuela

The Venezuelan Cycling Federation (in Spanish: Federación Venezolana de Ciclismo) is the national governing body of cycle racing in Venezuela.

It is a member of the UCI and COPACI.
