= Juan Pablo Dotti =

Argentine racing cyclist

Personal information
- Full name: Juan Pablo Dotti
- Born: 24 June 1984 (age 42)

Cycling career
- Sport: Cycling
- Current team: Sindicato de Empleados Publicos de San Juan
- Discipline: Road
- Role: Rider

Amateur teams
- 2009–2010: Aerocat–Latino
- 2015–2016: Stylo Bike San Juan

Professional teams
- 2007–2008: Cinelli–Endeka–OPD
- 2017–: Sindicato de Empleados Publicos de San Juan

Juan Pablo Dotti (born 24 June 1984) is an Argentine professional racing cyclist, who currently rides for UCI Continental team Sindicato de Empleados Publicos de San Juan.

On October 21, 2011, he was suspended by the USADA for testing positive to doping.

== Cera results ==
2004
2nd Time trial, National Under-23 Road Championships
2005
1st Time trial, National Under-23 Road Championships
2007
1st Stage 3 Vuelta a Navarra
Vuelta a Venezuela

1st Stages 1a & 11

3rd Overall Vuelta a San Juan

1st Stage 9

2008
1st Stage 9 Vuelta a San Juan
2009
1st Stage 5 Vuelta del Uruguay
2012
~~1st Road race, National Road Championships~~
2018
1st Stage 2 Vuelta del Uruguay
2nd Overall Vuelta del Uruguay
2019
1st Time trial, National Road Championships
4th Overall Vuelta Ciclista de Chile
2020
10th Overall Vuelta a San Juan
2021
1st Time trial, National Road Championships
2022
2nd Time trial, National Road Championships
7th Overall Vuelta del Porvenir San Luis
2023
5th Overall Vuelta del Porvenir San Luis

1st Stage 3

8th Time trial, Pan American Road Championships
