= Concarán =

Coordinates: 32°34′S 65°15′W

- Municipality and City
- Interactive map of Concarán
- Country: Argentina
- Province: San Luis Province
- Concarán Foundation: June 25, 1858

Government
  - Intendent: Nestor Daniel Elías
- Elevation: 663 m (2,175 ft)
- Time zone: UTC−3 (ART)
- Postal code: 5770
- Area code: (2656)

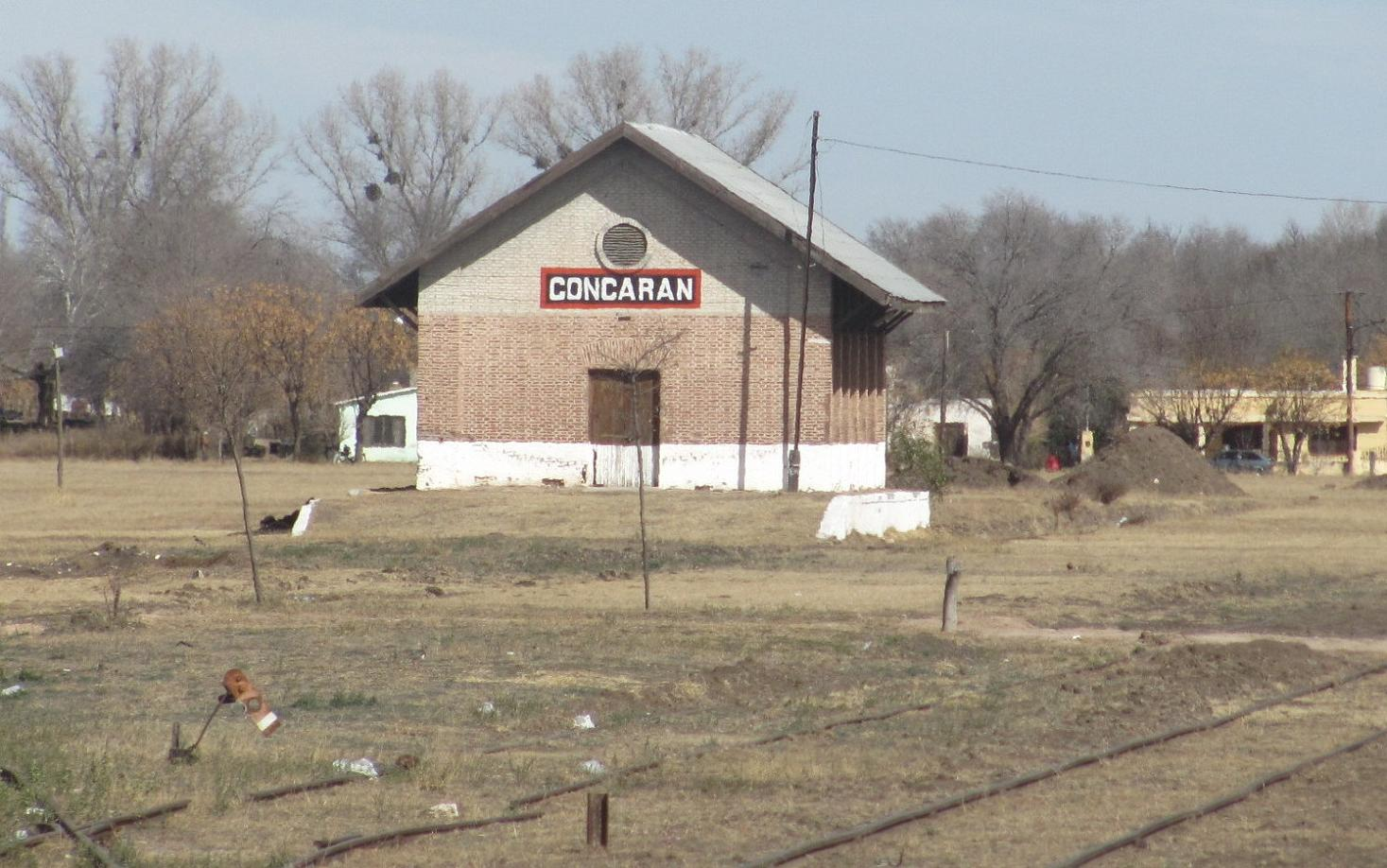
Concarán

Concarán is the capital city of Chacabuco Department or County, in San Luis Province in central Argentina.

•Distances:

Merlo: 28 mi/45 km.

Buenos Aires: 488 mi/786 km.

Córdoba: 163 mi/263 km.

San Luis: 99 mi/160 km.

Mendoza: 258 mi/415 km.

Santiago: 479 mi/772 km.

== Education ==
Concarán City has two kindergartens, two primary schools, and two secondary schools.

One of the main secondary schools in the city is Technical College Governor Elías Adre. It is located in the northern part of the city and is considered one of the three best secondary schools in San Luis Province.
