= Emiliano Contreras =

Argentine cyclist (born 1994)

Personal information
- Full name: Emiliano José Contreras Tivani
- Born: 1 July 1994 (age 32) San Juan, Argentina

Cycling career
- Sport: Cycling
- Current team: Chimbas Te Quiero
- Discipline: Road
- Role: Rider

Amateur teams
- 2014: Municipalidad de Pocito
- 2017: Shania

Professional teams
- 2016: Sindicato de Empleados Publicos de San Juan
- 2018–2019: Asociación Civil Mardan
- 2020–2021: Transportes Puertas de Cuyo
- 2022–: Chimbas Te Quiero
Medal record
Men's road bicycle racing
Representing Argentina
Pan American Championships
Gold medal – first place	2022 San Juan	Road race

Emiliano José Contreras Tivani (born 1 July 1994) is an Argentinian professional racing cyclist, who currently rides for UCI Continental team Chimbas Te Quiero.

== Major results ==
2011
2nd Road race, National Junior Road Championships
2012
3rd Time trial, National Junior Road Championships
2015
National Under-23 Road Championships

1st Road race
1st Time trial

Pan American Under-23 Road Championships

8th Road race
8th Time trial

2016
1st Time trial, National Under-23 Road Championships
1st Stage 2 Vuelta a Mendoza
1st Prologue (TTT) Giro del Sol San Juan
7th Time trial, Pan American Under-23 Road Championships
2019
3rd Overall Giro del Sol San Juan
2022
1st Road race, Pan American Road Championships
1st Road race, National Road Championships
