= Mike's Mic =

Australian YouTuber

- Born: Michael Messineo; 10 December 1995 (age 30); Perth, Western Australia, Australia
- Education: University of Western Australia
- Occupation: YouTuber

YouTube information
- Channel: Mike's Mic
- Years active: 2015–present
- Subscribers: 1.17 million
- Views: 187 million
- Last updated: 7 July 2026

Michael Messineo (born 10 December 1995), better known as Mike's Mic, is an Australian YouTuber. He is best known for his long-form videos about television shows in which he recaps plots and shares his opinions. He also makes videos about pop culture.

== Early life and background ==
Messineo grew up in Mandurah, Western Australia. He graduated from the University of Western Australia with both a bachelor's and a master's degree in mechanical engineering. After graduating, he worked as a programmer in Melbourne, where he currently resides.

== Career ==
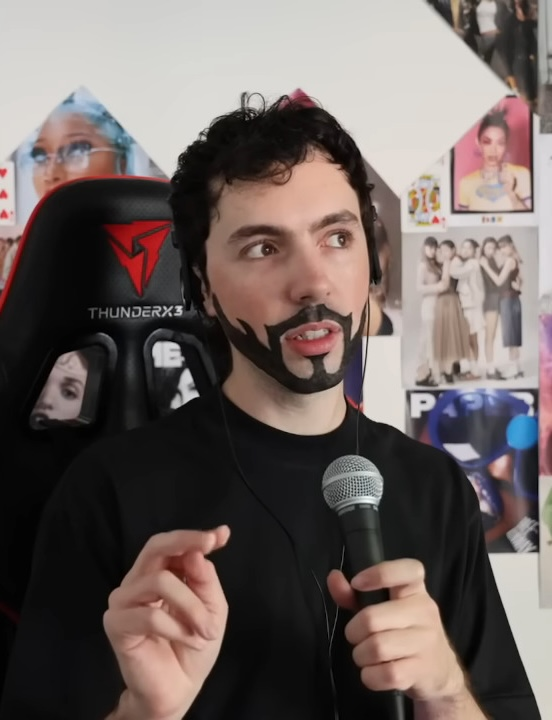
Messineo cosplaying as Seneca Crane of The Hunger Games in a recap of the film series

Messineo started his YouTube channel in 2015. In 2017, after moving to Melbourne for work, he started making content about reality television.

In 2019, Messineo posted a nineteen-minute recap of Riverdale's third season. His recap videos are considered part of a broader trend of long-form content on YouTube. Messineo's most well-known content comes from his "unhinged recap" series, where he has uploaded videos on television shows like Pretty Little Liars, Glee, Gossip Girl, and Lost. These recaps have a duration of multiple hours: his recap of Pretty Little Liars, broken into three parts, is six hours long. His other content similarly covers pop culture, including reactions to reality TV and examinations of 2000s films.

In June 2020, Messineo began his podcast Jumping in an Elevator, in which he "answer[s] the questions that you want to know the answer to but can't be bothered searching yourself. What happens when you jump in an elevator? Did Taylor Swift travel in a suitcase? Let's find out!"

In July 2023, Messineo told Vulture that he was working on developing the scripts for a series of three heist movies.
