= Nelson Soto =

Chilean footballer and manager (born 1963)

Personal information
- Full name: Nelson Segundo Soto Faúndez
- Date of birth: 29 March 1963 (age 63)
- Place of birth: San Javier de Loncomilla, Chile
- Height: 1.74 m (5 ft 8 1/2 in)
- Position: Midfielder

Team information
- Current team: Cobreloa (youth manager)

Youth career
- Rangers

Senior career*
Years	Team	Apps	(Gls)
1982–1986	Rangers	22	(1)
1987–1988	Huachipato	31	(14)
1989–1994	Palestino	42	(10)
1995	Rangers	39	(15)
1996	Deportes Iquique	28	(5)
1997	Magallanes	1	(0)

International career^{‡}
1984	Chile U23	3	(0)

Managerial career
- 2008: Deportes Temuco
- 2009: Lota Schwager
- 2009: Deportes Temuco
- 2010: Barnechea
- 2012: San Luis Quillota
- 2012–2013: Unión San Felipe
- 2015: General Velásquez
- 2015–2018: Iberia
- 2018–2020: Cobreloa (youth)
- 2020–2021: Cobreloa
- 2021–: Cobreloa (youth)
- 2024: Cobreloa (caretaker)
- * Club domestic league appearances and goals as of 7 January 2022 ‡ National team caps and goals as of 5 August 2015

Nelson Segundo Soto Faúndez (born 29 March 1963) is a Chilean football manager and former player who played as a midfielder. He is the current manager of Cobreloa's youth categories.
