= Chimbas Te Quiero =

Argentine cycling team

Team information
- UCI code: CTQ
- Registered: Argentina
- Founded: 2021
- Discipline: Road
- Status: UCI Continental (2022–)

Key personnel
- General manager: Emiliano Fernandez
- Team manager: Ernesto Wasinghton Fernández

Team name history
- 2021–: Chimbas Te Quiero

Chimbas Te Quiero is an Argentinian UCI Continental cycling team founded in 2021. The team gained UCI Continental status in 2022.

== Team roster ==
As of 10 June 2023.

Rider	Date of birth
Dario Alvarez (ARG)	30 January 1990 (age 36)
Emiliano Contreras (ARG)	1 July 1994 (age 32)
Matias Exequiel Contreras (Note: Contreras joined the team on 31 March.) (ARG)	31 May 2003 (age 23)
Daniel Díaz (Note: Contreras joined the team on 1 March.) (ARG)	7 July 1989 (age 37)
Alejandro Durán (ARG)	23 March 1991 (age 35)
Pedro González (ARG)	4 June 1983 (age 43)
Higinio Lucero (ARG)	8 August 1990 (age 36)

Rider	Date of birth
Leandro Messineo (ARG)	13 September 1979 (age 46)
Angel Lautaro Oropel (Note: Oropel joined the team on 31 March.) (ARG)	2 October 2003 (age 22)
Mauro Richeze (ARG)	7 December 1985 (age 40)
Leonardo Rodríguez (ARG)	20 March 1998 (age 28)
Ivan Gabriel Ruiz (ARG)	26 January 1999 (age 27)
Tomas Ruiz (ARG)	20 May 2003 (age 23)
Sebastián Trillini (Note: Trillini left the team on 3 May.) (ARG)	16 April 1994 (age 32)

== Major results ==
2022
Argentina National Road Race Championships, Emiliano Contreras
Argentina National Time Trial Championships, Alejandro Durán
2023
Stage 2 Giro del Sol, Leandro Messineo
