= Laureano Rosas =

Argentine bicycle racer

Personal information
- Full name: Laureano Rosas
- Born: 23 August 1990 (age 36) Las Flores, Buenos Aires, Argentina

Cycling career
- Sport: Cycling
- Current team: Gremios por el Deporte–Cutral Co
- Discipline: Road
- Role: Rider
- Rider type: Sprinter; Rouleur

Amateur team
- 2014: Sindicato Empleados Públicos

Professional teams
- 2015–2016: Sindicato de Empleados Publicos de San Juan
- 2017: Tusnad Cycling Team
- 2018–2021: Asociación Civil Mardan
- 2022–: Electro 3–Gremios por el Deporte
Medal record
Men's road bicycle racing
Representing Argentina
Pan American Championships
Silver medal – second place	2016 San Cristóbal	Time trial

Laureano Rosas (born 23 August 1990 in Las Flores, Buenos aires) is an Argentine cyclist, who currently rides for UCI Continental team Gremios por el Deporte–Cutral Co. He rode in the time trial at the 2015 Pan American Games, finishing in 6th place. On November 26, 2024 a positive anti-doping control was announced in the news and in the 2024 Argentinian National Road Race Rosas was excluded of the results.

== Major results ==
2011
2nd Time trial, National Under-23 Road Championships
2nd Overall Clásica del Oeste-Doble Bragado

1st Stage 2

2012
1st Overall Clásica del Oeste-Doble Bragado

1st Stages 8

Pan American Road Championships

4th Under-23 road race
10th Road race

2013
1st Overall Rutas de América

1st Stages 1, 6 & 7b

2nd Overall Giro del Sol San Juan

1st Stage 8

2014
1st Time trial, National Road Championships
1st Overall Vuelta a San Juan

1st Stages 7 & 8

1st Overall Clásica del Oeste-Doble Bragado

1st Stage 8

1st Clásica de Venado Tuerto
2015
1st Overall Vuelta a San Juan

1st Stages 2, 4, 6 & 7

1st Stage 4 Giro del Sol San Juan
5th Overall Vuelta del Uruguay

1st Stage 4

6th Time trial, Pan American Games
2016
1st Time trial, National Road Championships
1st Overall Vuelta a San Juan

1st Stages 2, 3, 4, 5 & 7

1st Overall Clásica del Oeste-Doble Bragado

1st Stage 6

2nd Time trial, Pan American Road Championships
2nd Overall Vuelta del Uruguay

1st Stage 8

2017
6th Overall Vuelta a San Juan
2019
4th Time trial, National Road Championships
8th Time trial, Pan American Road Championships
2022
6th Overall Vuelta del Porvenir San Luis

1st Stage 3 (ITT)

2023
1st Overall Vuelta a Formosa

1st Stages 2 & 3

4th Clásica Doble Difunta Correa
7th Overall Tour de Catamarca
