= Argentine National Time Trial Championships =

National road cycling championship in Argentina

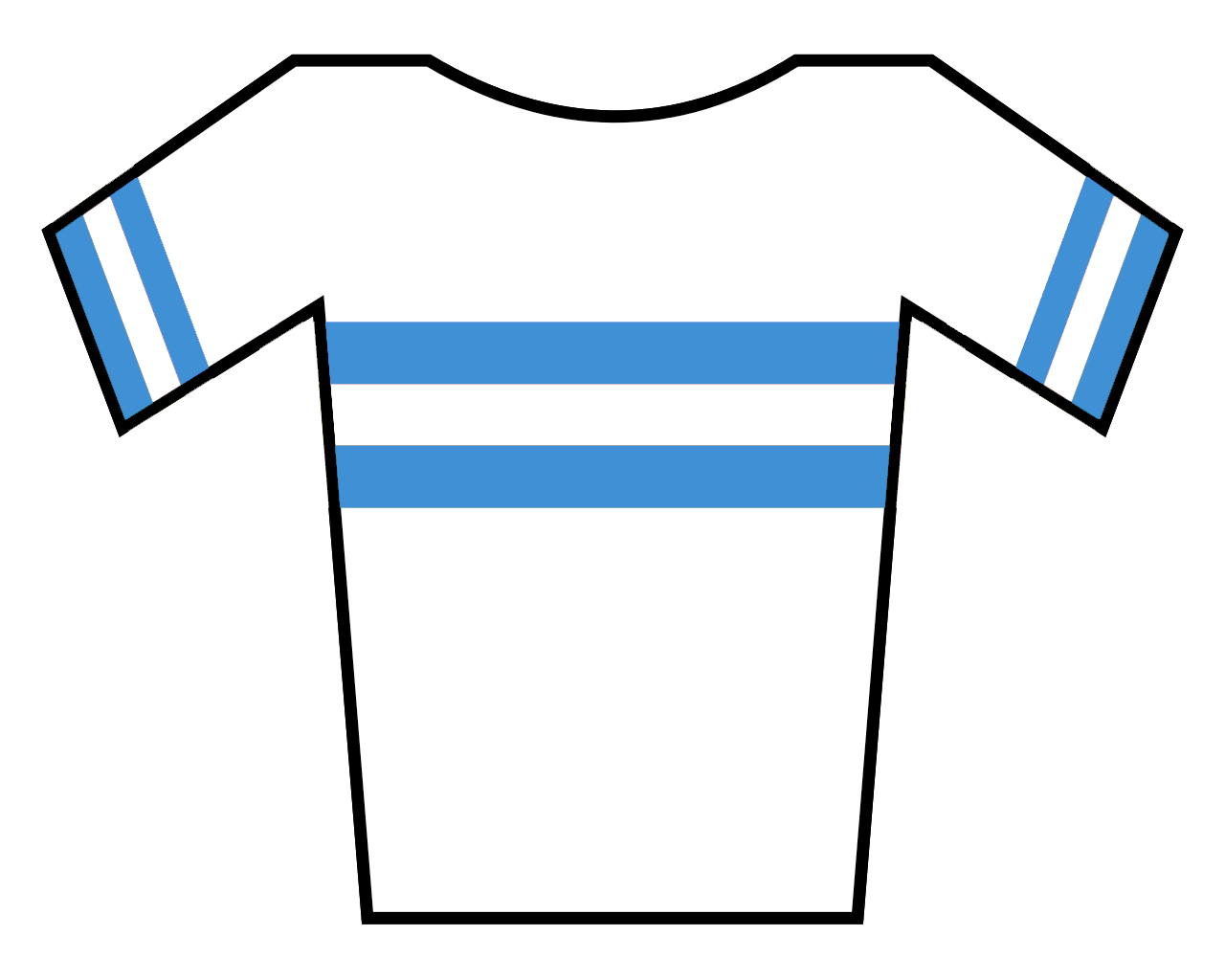
The champion's jersey

The Argentine National Time Trial Championships is a cycling race where the Argentine cyclists compete to decide who will become champion in the time trial discipline for the year to come.

== Men ==
=== Elite ===
Year	Gold	Silver	Bronze
2000	Edgardo Simón	Javier Gómez	Guillermo Brunetta
2001	Edgardo Simón	Javier Gómez	Gonzalo Salas
2002	Juan Curuchet	Oscar Villalobo	Pedro Prieto
2003	Guillermo Brunetta	Javier Gómez	Matías Médici
2004	Guillermo Brunetta	Oscar Villalobo	Matías Médici
2005	Guillermo Brunetta	Oscar Villalobo	César Sigura
2006	Matías Médici	Oscar Villalobo	César Sigura
2007	Guillermo Brunetta	Oscar Villalobo	Juan Manuel Aguirre
2008	Matías Médici	Martín Garrido	Jorge Giacinti
2009	Juan Curuchet	Matías Médici	Not awarded
2010	Matías Médici	Jorge Giacinti	Leandro Messineo
2011	Leandro Messineo	Matías Médici	Martín Garrido
2012	Ignacio Pereyra	Juan Lucero	Daniel Zamora
2013	Leandro Messineo	Sergio Godoy	Cristian Ranquehue
2014	Laureano Rosas	Daniel Díaz	Jorge Giacinti
2015	Alejandro Durán	Matías Médici	Juan Lucero
2016	Laureano Rosas	Emiliano Ibarra	Hugo Velázquez
2017	Mauricio Muller	Emiliano Ibarra	Juan Melivilo
2018	Emiliano Ibarra	Rubén Ramos	Alejandro Durán
2019	Juan Dotti	Emiliano Ibarra	Alejandro Durán
2021	Juan Dotti	Alejandro Durán	Leonardo Cobarrubia
2022	Alejandro Durán	Juan Dotti	German Tivani
2023	Sergio Fredes	Juan Pablo Dotti	Leonardo Cobarrubia
2024	Sergio Fredes	Leonardo Cobarrubia	Diego Valenzuela
2025	Mateo Kalejmann	Fausto Gómez	Alejandro Durán

=== Under-23 ===
Year	Gold	Silver	Bronze
1998	Oscar Villalobo		
1999	Oscar Villalobo		
2000	Claudio Flores		
2001	Claudio Flores	Oscar Villalobo	Geraldo Rios
2002	Claudio Flores	Alejandro Borrajo	Ariel Alesso
2003	César Sigura	Aníbal Borrajo	Nélson Rodríguez
2004	Jorge Pi	Juan Pablo Dotti	Facundo Bazzi
2005	Juan Pablo Dotti	Federico Forgaral	Jorge Pi
2006	Federico Pagani		
2007	Emanuel Saldaño	Federico Pagani	Gabriel Richard
2008	Román Mastrángelo	Gustavo Borcard	Ignacio Pérez
2009	Román Mastrángelo	Daniel Díaz	Ignacio Pérez
2010	Sergio Godoy	Román Mastrángelo	Mauro Agostini
2011	Eduardo Sepúlveda	Laureano Rosas	Fernando Barroso
2012	Cristian Martínez	Rubén Ramos	Fernando Barroso
2013	Facundo Lezica	Diego Tivani	Rubén Ramos
2014	Hugo Velázquez	Rubén Ramos	Diego Tivani
2015	Emiliano Contreras	Fernando Joel Torres	Nicolás Tivani
2016	Emiliano Contreras	Fernando Joel Torres	Facundo Crisafulli
2017	Nicolás Tivani	Isaías Abú	Facundo Crisafulli
2018	Mauricio Graziani	Leonardo Rodríguez	Leonardo Cobarrubia
2019	Agustín Martínez	Iván Ruiz	Santiago Ordoñez
2021	Santiago Sanchez	Agustin Del Negro	Lukas Dundic
2022	Tomas Eloy Moyano		

=== Junior ===
Year	Gold	Silver	Bronze
2003	Federico Pagani	Mauro Richere	Matías Klein
2004	Nicolas Di Santo	Carlos Anias	Joaquim Piaggio
2005	Aron Di Santo	Ignacio Pérez	Carlos Corti
2007	Román Mastrángelo	Mauro Agostini	Alexander Caselles
2008	Eduardo Sepúlveda	lexander Caselles	Elvio Gassman
2010	Facundo Lezica	Ezequiel Linaza	Hugo Velázquez
2011	Manuel Díaz	Juan Ignacio Curuchet	Mariano Rodríguez
2012	Sebastián Trillini	Nicolás Tivani	Emiliano Contreras
2013	Facundo Crisafulli	Nicolás Tivani	Julio Fernando Gil
2014	Mauricio Graziani	Julio Fernando Gil	Facundo Crisafulli
2015	Santiago Yeri	Agustín Martínez	Lautaro González
2016	Tomás Contte	Alexis Nicolás Castillo	Iván Ruiz
2017	Santiago Sánchez	Iván Ruiz	Tomás Loscalzo
2018	Juan Antonio Salazar	Santiago Ordoñez	Agustin Del Negro
2019	Lukas Dundic	Rodrigo Corro	Frederico Gomez
2020	Tomas Eloy Moyano		
2021	Tomas Eloy Moyano	Tomas Gonzalo Ruiz	Matias Quiroga
2022	Nehuel Erripa	Mateo Kalejman	Fabrizio Crozzolo

== Women ==
=== Elite ===
Year	Gold	Silver	Bronze
2010	Valeria Müller	Tania Castro	Ana Arias
2011	Valeria Müller	Maria Carla Álvarez	Talya Aguirre
2013	Inez Carolina Gutiérrez	Christina Greve	Ana Arias
2014	Valeria Müller	Maria Carla Álvarez	Florencia Guzman
2015	Valeria Müller	Maria Carla Álvarez	Graciela Zarate
2016	Estefanía Pilz	Inez Carolina Gutiérrez	Valeria Müller
2017	Valeria Müller	Fiorela Malaspina	Inez Carolina Gutiérrez
2018	Estefanía Pilz	Fiorela Malaspina	Antonela Leonardi
2019	Fiorela Malaspina	Valeria Müller	Antonela Leonardi
2021	Barbara Malaspina	Maribel Aguirre	Antonela Leonardi
2022	Antonella Leonardi	Carolina Pérez	María Alejandra Valoris
2023	Anabel Yapura	Fiorella Malaspina	Carolina Pérez
2024	Carolina Maldonado	Antonella Leonardi	Maria Yanina Acosta
2025	Fiorella Malasipina	Maribel Aguirre	Jennifer Francone

== See also ==
- Argentine National Road Race Championships
- National Road Cycling Championships
