= Transportes Puertas de Cuyo =

Argentine cycling team

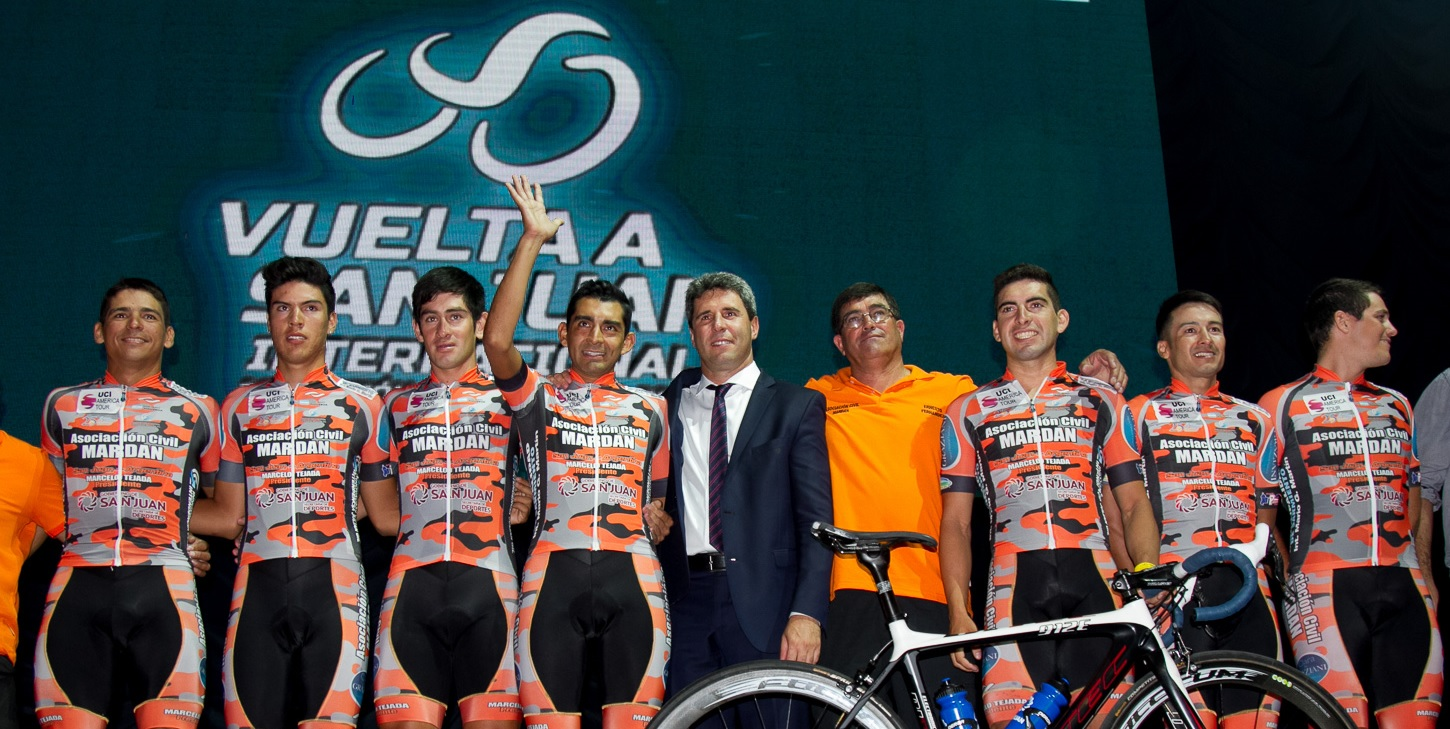

Team information
- UCI code: TPC
- Registered: Argentina
- Founded: 2017
- Disbanded: 2021
- Discipline: Road
- Status: UCI Continental (2017–2020); Club (2021)

Team name history
- 2017–2019 2020–2021: Asociación Civil Mardan; Transportes Puertas de Cuyo

Transportes Puertas de Cuyo was an Argentine UCI Continental cycling team. The team was founded in 2017 and disbanded at the end of the 2021 season.

== Team roster ==
As of 24 May 2020.

Rider	Date of birth
Omar Azzem (ARG)	21 August 1992 (age 34)
Juan Baron (ARG)	17 February 1987 (age 39)
Juan Boldu (ARG)	9 August 1995 (age 31)
Emiliano Contreras (ARG)	1 July 1994 (age 32)
Daniel Díaz (ARG)	7 July 1989 (age 37)
Darío Díaz (ARG)	13 July 1981 (age 45)

Rider	Date of birth
Emiliano Ibarra (ARG)	20 January 1982 (age 44)
Leandro Messineo (ARG)	13 September 1979 (age 46)
Adrián Richeze (ARG)	29 April 1989 (age 37)
Mauro Richeze (ARG)	7 December 1985 (age 40)
Laureano Rosas (ARG)	23 August 1990 (age 36)
