= Sergio Godoy (Argentine cyclist) =

Argentine cyclist

Personal information
- Full name: Sergio Daniel Godoy Centeno
- Born: 7 July 1988 (age 38) Mendoza, Argentina
- Height: 175 cm (5 ft 9 in)
- Weight: 60 kg (132 lb)

Cycling career
- Sport: Cycling
- Discipline: Road
- Role: Rider

Amateur teams
- 2009–2012: Municipalidad de Guaymallén
- 2010: Seguros Bilbao

Professional team
- 2013–2016: San Luis Somos Todos

Sergio Daniel Godoy Centeno (born 7 July 1988 in Mendoza) is an Argentinian road cyclist.

== Major results ==
2010
1st Time trial, National Under-23 Road Championships
2011
2nd Overall Vuelta Ciclista de Chile
3rd Overall Vuelta a Mendoza

1st Prologue (TTT) & Stage 10

2012
1st Stage 5a Vuelta Ciclista de Chile
2nd Overall Vuelta a Mendoza

1st Stage 10

2013
1st Clásica 1 de Mayo
2nd Time trial, National Road Championships
2014
2nd Overall Vuelta a Mendoza
3rd Overall Tour de San Luis
2016
2nd Overall Vuelta a Mendoza
3rd Overall Vuelta a la Independencia Nacional
