= Leandro Messineo =

Argentine cyclist

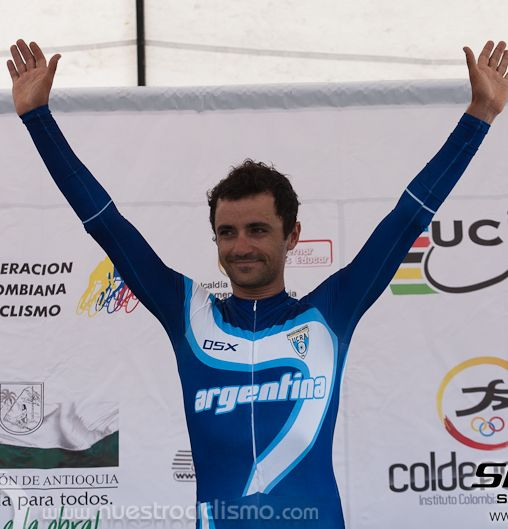
- Messineo in 2011

Personal information
- Full name: Leandro Carlos Messineo
- Born: 13 September 1979 (age 47) Olavarría, Argentina

Cycling career
- Sport: Cycling
- Current team: Chimbas Te Quiero
- Discipline: Road
- Role: Rider
- Rider type: Time trialist

Amateur teams
- 2002: Tres de Febrero
- 2003: Tano Viejo
- 2009: Sindicato de la Fruta
- 2010: Fríosur
- 2011: Agrupación Ramón Carrillo
- 2015: Nuevos Ferrocarriles Argentinos
- 2016: Mirasal
- 2017: Raleigh–Nitro
- 2017–2018: KTM
- 2021: Chimbas Te Quiero

Professional teams
- 2012–2015: San Luis Somos Todos
- 2019–2020: Asociación Civil Mardan
- 2022–: Chimbas Te Quiero
Medal record
Men's road bicycle racing
Representing Argentina
Pan American Championships
Gold medal – first place	2011 Medellín	Time trial
Bronze medal – third place	2013 Zacatecas	Time trial

Leandro Carlos Messineo (born 13 September 1979 in Olavarría) is an Argentine cyclist, who currently rides for UCI Continental team Chimbas Te Quiero.

== Major results ==
2010
1st Stage 3 Vuelta al Ecuador
National Road Championships

2nd Road race
3rd Time trial

2011
1st Time trial, Pan American Road Championships
1st Time trial, National Road Championships
1st Stage 5 Tour de San Luis
5th Time trial, Pan American Games
2012
Vuelta a Bolivia

1st Points classification
1st Stage 2

6th Overall Tour do Brasil
2013
1st Time trial, National Road Championships
1st Sprints classification Tour de San Luis
1st Stage 3 (TTT) Vuelta a Bolivia
3rd Time trial, Pan American Road Championships
2014
8th Time trial, South American Games
2015
9th Overall Tour de San Luis
2016
4th Time trial, National Road Championships
2022
4th Overall Vuelta del Porvenir San Luis
2023
8th Overall Giro del Sol

1st Stage 2
