= Chilean Cycling Federation =

National governing body of cycle racing in Chile

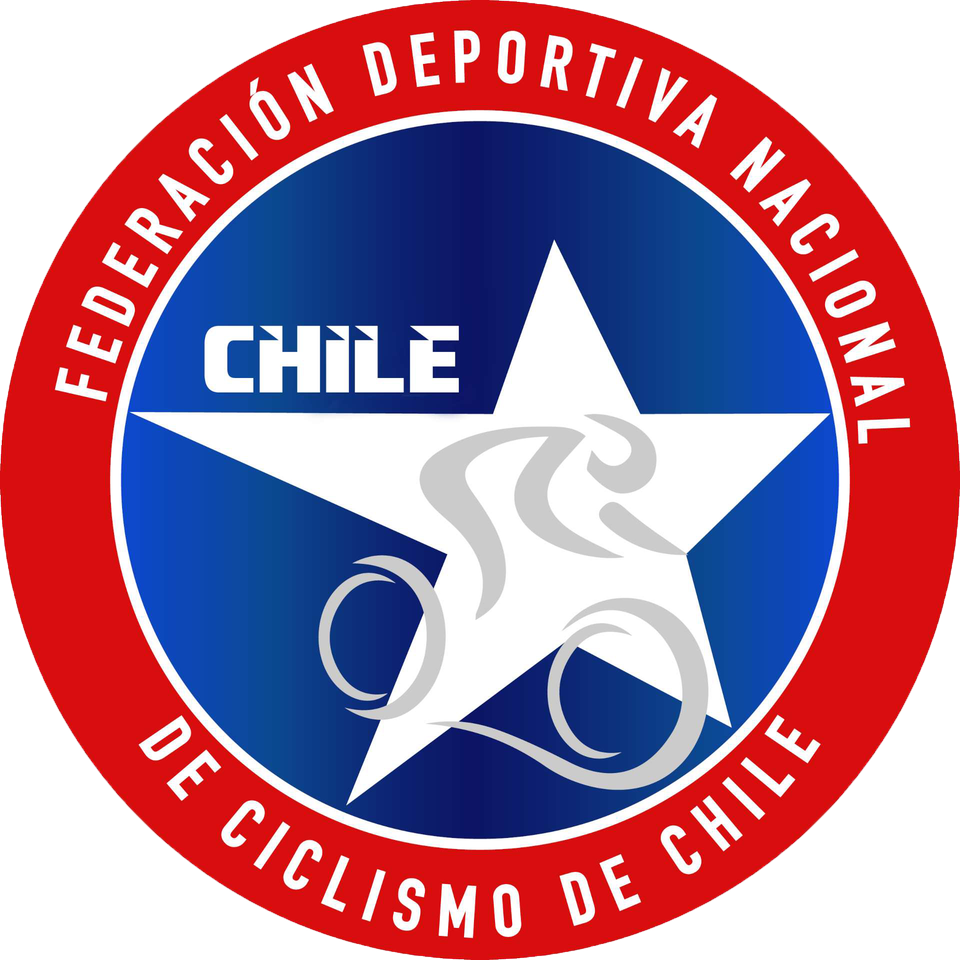
Logo of the Chilean Cycling Federation

The Chilean Cycling Federation (in Spanish: Federación Ciclista de Chile) is the national governing body of cycle racing in Chile.

It is a member of the UCI and COPACI.

== See also ==
- Vuelta Ciclista Por Un Chile Lider
