= Argentine Cycling Union =

National governing body of cycle racing in Argentina

- Sport: Bicycle racing
- Jurisdiction: National
- Abbreviation: UCRA
- Affiliation: UCI
- Regional affiliation: COPACI
- Headquarters: Buenos Aires, Argentina
- President: Jorge Eduardo Chica Muñoz

Official website
- ucraargentina.com
- (Argentina)

The Cycling Union of the Argentine Republic (Spanish: Unión Ciclista de la República Argentina) is the national governing body of cycle racing in Argentina.

It is a member of the UCI and COPACI.
