= Sindicato de Empleados Publicos de San Juan =

Argentine cycling team

Team information
- UCI code: SEP
- Registered: Argentina
- Founded: 2013
- Discipline: Road
- Status: UCI Continental

Key personnel
- General manager: José Alberto Díaz
- Team manager: Gabriel Puchetta

Team name history
- 2013–2014 2015–: Sindicato Empleados Públicos; Sindicato de Empleados Publicos de San Juan

Sindicato de Empleados Publicos de San Juan is an Argentine UCI Continental cycling team established in 2013.

== Team roster ==
As of 16 April 2021.

Rider	Date of birth
Dario Álvarez (ARG)	30 January 1990 (age 36)
Leonardo Bravo (ARG)	13 January 2002 (age 24)
Leonardo Cobarrubia (ARG)	26 March 1998 (age 28)
Juan Pablo Dotti (ARG)	24 June 1984 (age 42)
Alejandro Durán (ARG)	23 March 1991 (age 35)

Rider	Date of birth
Leandro González (ARG)	11 February 1998 (age 28)
Matías Lisa (ARG)	25 August 1990 (age 36)
Ángel Naveda (ARG)	8 April 2000 (age 26)
Nicolás Traico (ARG)	22 May 1992 (age 34)
Eduardo Vila (ARG)	2 December 1997 (age 28)

== Doping ==
In May 2018, Gonzalo Najar tested positive for the third-generation EPO-based blood booster CERA on January 21 - the day of the opening stage of the 2018 Vuelta a San Juan.

== Major results ==
2015
Stage 4 Vuelta Ciclista del Uruguay, Laureano Rosas

2016
Stage 8 Vuelta Ciclista del Uruguay, Laureano Rosas
Argentina National Time Trial Championships, Laureano Rosas

2017
Argentina National Road Race Championships, Gonzalo Najar
Argentina National Time Trial Championships, Mauricio Muller
Mexico National Time Trial Championships, Ignacio de Jesús Prado

2018
Stage 5 Vuelta a San Juan Internacional, Gonzalo Najar
