= 2016 Tour de San Luis =

2016 UCI America Tour

Race details
- Dates: 18–24 January 2016
- Stages: 7
- Distance: 921.7 km (572.7 mi)

Results
Jersey awarded to the overall winner	Winner	Dayer Quintana (COL)	(Movistar Team)
	Second	Eduardo Sepúlveda (ARG)	(Fortuneo–Vital Concept)
	Third	Nairo Quintana (COL)	(Movistar Team)
Jersey awarded to the mountains classification winner	Mountains	Eduardo Sepúlveda (ARG)	(Fortuneo–Vital Concept)
Jersey awarded to the young rider classification winner	Young rider	Miguel Ángel López (COL)	(Astana)
	Team	Movistar Team	

The 2016 Tour de San Luis was a road cycling stage race that took place in Argentina between 18 and 24 January 2016. It was the tenth edition of the Tour de San Luis. The race was used by many European-based riders as the beginning of their 2016 road seasons. It was rated as a 2.1 event as part of the 2016 UCI America Tour. The defending champion is the Argentine cyclist Daniel Díaz (Delko–Marseille Provence KTM).

The race took place over seven days. The first stage was a team time trial; there were also two stages suitable for sprinters, two suitable for riders who can both climb and sprint, and two mountain-top finishes suitable for the best climbers.

The team time trial was won by Etixx–Quick-Step, putting their rider Maximiliano Richeze into the lead. Another Etixx–Quick-Step rider, Fernando Gaviria, won the second stage and took over the race lead. He lost this the following day to Peter Koning (Drapac Professional Cycling), who won in a solo breakaway. The first mountain stage was won by Eduardo Sepúlveda (Fortuneo–Vital Concept), giving him a three-second advantage over Dayer Quintana (Movistar Team). This was maintained through the following stage, won in a solo breakaway. The final mountain stage was won by Miguel Ángel López (Astana), with Quintana taking enough time out of Sepúlveda to put himself into the race lead. The final sprint stage was won by Jakub Mareczko (Italy), with Quintana taking the overall win.

== Participating teams ==
The race organisers selected 28 teams to take part in the race, including 7 UCI WorldTeams. There were also six UCI Professional Continental teams, seven UCI Continental teams and eight national teams.

UCI WorldTeams

- Tinkoff
- Movistar Team
- Etixx–Quick-Step
- Astana
- AG2R La Mondiale
- Lampre–Merida
- Cannondale

UCI Pro Continental teams

- UnitedHealthcare
- Drapac Professional Cycling
- Androni Giocattoli–Sidermec
- Nippo–Vini Fantini
- Fortuneo–Vital Concept
- Delko–Marseille Provence KTM

UCI Continental teams

- San Luis Somos Todos
- Inteja–MMR Dominican Cycling Team
- Team Jamis
- Vivo Team Grupo Oresy
- Los Matanceros
- Strongman–Campagnolo
- Sindicato Empleados Públicos of San Juan

National teams

- Argentina
- Italy
- Brazil
- Chile
- Mexico
- Uruguay
- Costa Rica
- Cuba

== Pre-race favourites ==
The Tour de San Luis is one of the earliest races in the cycling calendar. It takes place at the same time as the Tour Down Under, which takes place in Australia. The Tour de San Luis takes place on far more mountainous terrain than the Tour Down Under and is used by many riders, especially climbers, as a way to begin the season.

The general classification is expected to be decided in the two mountainous stages and the team time trial. The contest involves both riders from the top European teams who are beginning their seasons and also riders from South America who are in the middle of their summer. Many of the South American riders use the Tour de San Luis to prepare for their national championships.

Because so many of the European riders were beginning their seasons at the race, it was unclear which were in good form. There were two riders from European teams who had won the Tour de San Luis in the past. Nairo Quintana (Movistar Team) had won the 2014 race and had come third in 2015; he was one of the principal favourites for the overall victory. Another favourite was Vincenzo Nibali (Astana), who won the 2010 race and who came to the race with the intention to compete for the overall victory. Other riders from WorldTeams with a chance of victory included Quintana's teammate Daniel Moreno, Nibali's teammate Miguel Ángel López, Rafał Majka (Tinkoff), Jean-Christophe Péraud (AG2R La Mondiale) and Andrew Talansky (Cannondale).

The principal South American favourite was the defending champion, Daniel Díaz. Díaz had won the 2015 edition and the 2013 edition. Díaz, an Argentine rider, had moved to a higher-level team for the 2016 season – the UCI Professional Continental Drapac Professional Cycling – and was expected to be highly motivated for the race. His team, however, was expected to struggle in the team time trial. Other South American riders with a chance of victory included Rodolfo Torres (Androni Giocattoli–Sidermec), who was second in 2015, and Eduardo Sepúlveda (Fortuneo–Vital Concept).

Several other riders came to the race hoping for stage victories. These included Peter Sagan (Tinkoff), who was looking for his first victory in the rainbow jersey he wore as the 2015 road race world champion, Fernando Gaviria (Etixx–Quick-Step), who won two races in the 2015 Tour de San Luis and Elia Viviani (riding for the Italian national team).

== Route and stages ==
The race will include seven stages. The first will be a 21-kilometre (13 mi) team time trial. The second stage, the longest of the race at 181.9 kilometres (113.0 mi), is mostly flat and will suit the sprinters; the third stage is also likely to end in a sprint, although a climb shortly before the finish could be suitable for an attack. The fourth stage finishes with the climb of the Alto del Amago. There is a shorter uphill finish the following day, which is unlikely to cause significant time gaps. There is another mountain stage on the sixth day, however; it finishes on the Filo Sierras Comechingones, which is described by Cycling Weekly as "fearsome". The final stage will be held on a circuit in San Luis itself and will again suit the sprinters.

Stage schedule
Stage	Date	Route	Distance	Type	Winner
1	18 January	El Durazno – El Durazno	21 km (13 mi)	Team time trial	Etixx–Quick-Step
2	19 January	San Luis – Villa Mercedes	181.9 km (113 mi)	Flat stage	Fernando Gaviria (COL)
3	20 January	Potrero de Los Funes – La Punta	131 km (81 mi)	Hilly stage	Peter Koning (NED)
4	21 January	Terrazas del Portezuelo – Cerro El Amago	140 km (87 mi)	Mountain stage	Eduardo Sepúlveda (ARG)
5	22 January	Renca – Juana Koslay	168.7 km (105 mi)	Hilly stage	German Tivani (ARG)
6	23 January	La Toma – Filo de la Sierra de Comechingones	159.5 km (99 mi)	Mountain stage	Miguel Ángel López (COL)
7	24 January	San Luis – San Luis	119.6 km (74 mi)	Flat stage	Jakub Mareczko (ITA)

=== Stage 1 ===
Stage 1 was a 21-kilometre (13 mi) team time trial around El Durazno over rolling terrain, with no significant or difficult climbs.

Drapac Professional Cycling were the first team to set a time: they finished in 24' 53" with an average speed of 50.6 kilometres per hour (31.4 mph). They were soon beaten, however, by UnitedHealthcare, who were six seconds faster. The Colombian rider Carlos Alzate was the first UnitedHealthcare rider to cross the line. This time was good enough to beat several of the next teams to race, including the WorldTeams Lampre–Merida and AG2R La Mondiale. Eventually, Tinkoff took over the lead by finishing 31 seconds ahead of UnitedHealthcare. Their lead was brief, however, as Etixx–Quick-Step soon finished a further 23 seconds ahead with a time of 23' 53" and an average speed of 52.8 kilometres per hour (32.8 mph).

At this point there were four teams left to race. The Continental-level team Holowesko–Citadel finished well down the field, but the remaining teams were all WorldTeams with contenders for the overall victory. Astana, led across the line by Vincenzo Nibali, finished 17 seconds behind Etixx–Quick-Step. Cannondale were much further back, losing nearly a minute. The final team across the line was Movistar Team; although they could not match the winning time, they did finish second.

Etixx–Quick-Step therefore won the stage; Maximiliano Richeze was the first to finish and so he was the first individual leader of the race. The win also put Rodrigo Contreras, the defending champion of the youth classification, into the lead of that competition. Nairo Quintana was the best-placed of the general classification riders; he took time out of all his rivals. This was in large part due to the work of his teammate Adriano Malori.

Result of Stage 1
Rank	Team	Time
1	Etixx–Quick-Step	23' 53"
2	Movistar Team	+ 8"
3	Astana	+ 18"
4	Tinkoff	+ 24"
5	UnitedHealthcare	+ 54"
6	AG2R La Mondiale	+ 56"
7	Delko–Marseille Provence KTM	+ 58"
8	Androni Giocattoli–Sidermec	+ 59"
9	Cannondale	+ 59"
10	Drapac Professional Cycling	+ 1' 00"

General classification after Stage 1
Rank	Rider	Team	Time
1	Maximiliano Richeze (ARG)	Etixx–Quick-Step	23' 53"
2	Rodrigo Contreras (COL)	Etixx–Quick-Step	+0"
3	Łukasz Wiśniowski (POL)	Etixx–Quick-Step	+0"
4	Fabio Sabatini (ITA)	Etixx–Quick-Step	+0"
5	Fernando Gaviria (COL)	Etixx–Quick-Step	+0"
6	Marc Soler (ESP)	Movistar Team	+8"
7	Nairo Quintana (COL)	Movistar Team	+8"
8	Adriano Malori (ITA)	Movistar Team	+8"
9	Daniel Moreno (ESP)	Movistar Team	+8"
10	Dayer Quintana (COL)	Movistar Team	+8"

=== Stage 2 ===
19 January – San Luis – Villa Mercedes, 181.9 km (113 mi)

Result of Stage 2
Rank	Rider	Team	Time
1	Fernando Gaviria (COL)	Etixx–Quick-Step	4h 23' 54"
2	Peter Sagan (SVK)	Tinkoff	+ 0"
3	Elia Viviani (ITA)	Italy	+ 0"
4	Eduard-Michael Grosu (ROM)	Nippo–Vini Fantini	+ 0"
5	Lucas Sebastián Haedo (ARG)	Team Jamis	+ 0"
6	Mauro Richeze (ARG)	San Luis Somos Todos	+ 0"
7	Francesco Chicchi (ITA)	Androni Giocattoli–Sidermec	+ 0"
8	Jason Lowndes (AUS)	Drapac Professional Cycling	+ 0"
9	Jakub Mareczko (ITA)	Italy	+ 0"
10	Marco Canola (ITA)	UnitedHealthcare	+ 0"

General classification after Stage 2
Rank	Rider	Team	Time
1	Fernando Gaviria (COL)	Etixx–Quick-Step	4h 47' 37"
2	Maximiliano Richeze (ARG)	Etixx–Quick-Step	+ 10"
3	Rodrigo Contreras (COL)	Etixx–Quick-Step	+ 10"
4	Łukasz Wiśniowski (POL)	Etixx–Quick-Step	+ 10"
5	Dayer Quintana (COL)	Movistar Team	+ 18"
6	Adriano Malori (ITA)	Movistar Team	+ 18"
7	Nairo Quintana (COL)	Movistar Team	+ 18"
8	Marc Soler (ESP)	Movistar Team	+ 18"
9	Daniel Moreno (ESP)	Movistar Team	+ 18"
10	Peter Sagan (SVK)	Tinkoff	+ 27"

=== Stage 3 ===
20 January – Potrero de Los Funes – La Punta, 131 km (81 mi)

Result of Stage 3
Rank	Rider	Team	Time
1	Peter Koning (NED)	Drapac Professional Cycling	3h 08' 41"
2	Fernando Gaviria (COL)	Etixx–Quick-Step	+ 1' 37"
3	Travis McCabe (USA)	Holowesko Citadel Racing Team	+ 1' 37"
4	Peter Sagan (SVK)	Tinkoff	+ 1' 37"
5	Mauro Richeze (ARG)	San Luis Somos Todos	+ 1' 37"
6	Alexis Vuillermoz (FRA)	AG2R La Mondiale	+ 1' 37"
7	Julien Loubet (FRA)	Fortuneo–Vital Concept	+ 1' 37"
8	Daniel Moreno (ESP)	Movistar Team	+ 1' 37"
9	Dayer Quintana (COL)	Movistar Team	+ 1' 37"
10	Miguel Ángel López (COL)	Astana	+ 1' 37"

General classification after Stage 3
Rank	Rider	Team	Time
1	Peter Koning (NED)	Drapac Professional Cycling	7h 57' 43"
2	Fernando Gaviria (COL)	Etixx–Quick-Step	+ 6"
3	Maximiliano Richeze (ARG)	Etixx–Quick-Step	+ 22"
4	Rodrigo Contreras (COL)	Etixx–Quick-Step	+ 22"
5	Dayer Quintana (COL)	Movistar Team	+ 30"
6	Nairo Quintana (COL)	Movistar Team	+ 30"
7	Daniel Moreno (ESP)	Movistar Team	+ 30"
8	Peter Sagan (SVK)	Tinkoff	+ 39"
9	Miguel Ángel López (COL)	Astana	+ 39"
10	Vincenzo Nibali (ITA)	Astana	+ 39"

=== Stage 4 ===
21 January – Terrazas del Portezuelo – Cerro El Amago, 140 km (87 mi)

Result of Stage 4
Rank	Rider	Team	Time
1	Eduardo Sepúlveda (ARG)	Fortuneo–Vital Concept	4h 00' 35"
2	Janier Acevedo (COL)	Team Jamis	+ 54"
3	Román Villalobos (CRC)	Costa Rica	+ 1' 31"
4	Dayer Quintana (COL)	Movistar Team	+ 1' 31"
5	Ilia Koshevoy (BLR)	Lampre–Merida	+ 1' 43"
6	Miguel Ángel López (COL)	Astana	+ 2' 10"
7	Rafał Majka (POL)	Tinkoff	+ 2' 10"
8	Nairo Quintana (COL)	Movistar Team	+ 2' 10"
9	Jonathan Millan (COL)	Strongman–Campagnolo–Wilier	+ 2' 12"
10	Anderson Maldonado (URY)	Uruguay	+ 2' 14"

General classification after Stage 4
Rank	Rider	Team	Time
1	Eduardo Sepúlveda (ARG)	Fortuneo–Vital Concept	12h 00' 16"
2	Dayer Quintana (COL)	Movistar Team	+ 3"
3	Rodrigo Contreras (COL)	Etixx–Quick-Step	+ 38"
4	Nairo Quintana (COL)	Movistar Team	+ 42"
5	Miguel Ángel López (COL)	Astana	+ 51"
6	Daniel Moreno (ESP)	Movistar Team	+ 56"
7	Román Villalobos (CRC)	Costa Rica	+ 1' 06"
8	Janier Acevedo (COL)	Team Jamis	+ 1' 09"
9	Ilia Koshevoy (BLR)	Lampre–Merida	+ 1' 22"
10	Rafał Majka (POL)	Tinkoff	+ 1' 36"

=== Stage 5 ===
22 January – Renca – Juana Koslay, 168.7 km (105 mi)

Result of Stage 5
Rank	Rider	Team	Time
1	German Nicolas Tivani (ARG)	Argentina	3h 37' 39"
2	Daniel Díaz (ARG)	Delko–Marseille Provence KTM	+ 0"
3	Emiliano Ibarra (ARG)	Sindicato Empleados Públicos of San Juan	+ 0"
4	Elia Viviani (ITA)	Italy	+ 1' 34"
5	Lucas Sebastián Haedo (ARG)	Team Jamis	+ 1' 34"
6	Eduard-Michael Grosu (ROM)	Nippo–Vini Fantini	+ 1' 34"
7	Davide Cimolai (ITA)	Lampre–Merida	+ 1' 34"
8	Yannick Martinez (FRA)	Delko–Marseille Provence KTM	+ 1' 34"
9	Marco Canola (ITA)	UnitedHealthcare	+ 1' 34"
10	Grega Bole (SLO)	Nippo–Vini Fantini	+ 1' 34"

General classification after Stage 5
Rank	Rider	Team	Time
1	Eduardo Sepúlveda (ARG)	Fortuneo–Vital Concept	15h 39' 29"
2	Dayer Quintana (COL)	Movistar Team	+ 3"
3	Rodrigo Contreras (COL)	Etixx–Quick-Step	+ 38"
4	Nairo Quintana (COL)	Movistar Team	+ 42"
5	Miguel Ángel López (COL)	Astana	+ 51"
6	Román Villalobos (CRC)	Costa Rica	+ 1' 06"
7	Janier Acevedo (COL)	Team Jamis	+ 1' 09"
8	Ilia Koshevoy (BLR)	Lampre–Merida	+ 1' 22"
9	Rafał Majka (POL)	Tinkoff	+ 1' 36"
10	André Cardoso (POR)	Cannondale	+ 1' 37"

=== Stage 6 ===
23 January – La Toma – Filo de la Sierra de Comechingones, 159.5 km (99 mi)

Result of Stage 6
Rank	Rider	Team	Time
1	Miguel Ángel López (COL)	Astana	4h 35' 49"
2	Nairo Quintana (COL)	Movistar Team	+ 2"
3	Dayer Quintana (COL)	Movistar Team	+ 4"
4	Ilia Koshevoy (BLR)	Lampre–Merida	+ 23"
5	Eduardo Sepúlveda (ARG)	Fortuneo–Vital Concept	+ 23"
6	Rodolfo Torres (COL)	Androni Giocattoli–Sidermec	+ 41"
7	Rafał Majka (POL)	Tinkoff	+ 58"
8	Vincenzo Nibali (ITA)	Astana	+ 58"
9	Román Villalobos (CRC)	Costa Rica	+ 1' 38"
10	Janier Acevedo (COL)	Team Jamis	+ 1' 38"

General classification after Stage 6
Rank	Rider	Team	Time
1	Dayer Quintana (COL)	Movistar Team	20h 15' 21"
2	Eduardo Sepúlveda (ARG)	Fortuneo–Vital Concept	+ 20"
3	Nairo Quintana (COL)	Movistar Team	+ 35"
4	Miguel Ángel López (COL)	Astana	+ 38"
5	Ilia Koshevoy (BLR)	Lampre–Merida	+ 1' 42"
6	Rodolfo Torres (COL)	Androni Giocattoli–Sidermec	+ 2' 15"
7	Rafał Majka (POL)	Tinkoff	+ 2' 31"
8	Román Villalobos (CRC)	Costa Rica	+ 2' 41"
9	Janier Acevedo (COL)	Team Jamis	+ 2' 44"
10	André Cardoso (POR)	Cannondale	+ 3' 31"

=== Stage 7 ===
24 January – San Luis – San Luis, 119.6 km (74 mi)

Result of Stage 7
Rank	Rider	Team	Time
1	Jakub Mareczko (ITA)	Italy	2h 36' 51"
2	Elia Viviani (ITA)	Italy	+ 0"
3	Jason Lowndes (AUS)	Drapac Professional Cycling	+ 0"
4	Peter Sagan (SVK)	Tinkoff	+ 0"
5	Maximiliano Richeze (ARG)	Etixx–Quick-Step	+ 0"
6	Mauro Richeze (ARG)	San Luis Somos Todos	+ 0"
7	Grega Bole (SLO)	Nippo–Vini Fantini	+ 0"
8	Carlos Eduardo Alzate (COL)	UnitedHealthcare	+ 0"
9	Francesco Chicchi (ITA)	Androni Giocattoli–Sidermec	+ 0"
10	Julian Paulo Gaday (ARG)	Los Matanceros	+ 0"

Result of General Classification
Rank	Rider	Team	Time
1	Dayer Quintana (COL)	Movistar Team	22h 52' 12"
2	Eduardo Sepúlveda (ARG)	Fortuneo–Vital Concept	+ 20"
3	Nairo Quintana (COL)	Movistar Team	+ 35"
4	Miguel Ángel López (COL)	Astana	+ 38"
5	Ilia Koshevoy (BLR)	Lampre–Merida	+ 1' 42"
6	Rodolfo Torres (COL)	Androni Giocattoli–Sidermec	+ 2' 15"
7	Rafał Majka (POL)	Tinkoff	+ 2' 31"
8	Janier Acevedo (COL)	Team Jamis	+ 2' 44"
9	Román Villalobos (CRC)	Costa Rica	+ 2' 59"
10	André Cardoso (POR)	Cannondale	+ 3' 31"

== Classification leadership table ==
Stage	Winner	General classification	Mountains classification	Sprint classification	Young rider classification	Team classification
1	Etixx–Quick-Step	Maximiliano Richeze	Not awarded	Not awarded	Rodrigo Contreras	Etixx–Quick-Step
2	Fernando Gaviria	Fernando Gaviria	Ariel Sivori	Juan Curuchet	Fernando Gaviria	Etixx–Quick-Step
3	Peter Koning	Peter Koning	Peter Koning	Emmanuel Guevara	Fernando Gaviria	Etixx–Quick-Step
4	Eduardo Sepúlveda	Eduardo Sepúlveda	Eduardo Sepúlveda	Emmanuel Guevara	Rodrigo Contreras	Movistar Team
5	German Tivani	Eduardo Sepúlveda	Eduardo Sepúlveda	Emmanuel Guevara	Miguel Ángel López	Movistar Team
6	Miguel Ángel López	Dayer Quintana	Roman Villalobos	Emmanuel Guevara	Miguel Ángel López	Movistar Team
7	Jakub Mareczko	Dayer Quintana	Eduardo Sepúlveda	Emmanuel Guevara	Miguel Ángel López	Movistar Team
Final		Dayer Quintana	Eduardo Sepúlveda	Emmanuel Guevara	Miguel Ángel López	Movistar Team
