= 2013 Tour de San Luis =

2012–2013 UCI America Tour

Race details
- Dates: 21–27 January 2013
- Stages: 7
- Distance: 1,008.8 km (626.8 mi)
- Winning time: 24h 03' 16"

Results
	Winner	Daniel Díaz (Argentina)	(San Luis Somos Todos)
	Second	Tejay van Garderen (United States)	(BMC Racing Team)
	Third	Alex Correia Diniz (Brazil)	(Funvic Brasilinvest–São José dos Campos)
	Mountains	Emmanuel Guevara (Argentina)	(San Luis Somos Todos)
	Young rider	Alejandro Sivori (Argentina)	(Argentina (national team))
	Sprints	Leandro Messineo (Argentina)	(San Luis Somos Todos)
	Team	BMC Racing Team	

The 2013 Tour de San Luis was the 7th edition of the Tour de San Luis stage race. It was part of the 2012–2013 UCI America Tour, and took place between 21 and 27 January 2013. The race was won by Daniel Díaz of the San Luis Somos Todos squad, which enjoyed a successful event, as their riders Emmanuel Guevara and Leandro Messineo took the mountains classification and the sprints classification, respectively. The youth classification went to Alejandro Sivori of the Argentina National team and the team classification went to BMC Racing Team.

== Teams ==
The twenty-seven teams invited to the race were:

- Ag2r–La Mondiale
- Androni Giocattoli–Venezuela
- Argentina (national team)
- ASC Dukla Praha
- Astana
- Bardiani Valvole–CSF Inox
- BMC Racing Team
- Buenos Aires Provincia
- Caja Rural
- Cannondale
- CCC–Polsat–Polkowice
- Clos de Pirque-Trek
- Cuba (national team)
- Funvic Brasilinvest–São José dos Campos
- Jamis–Hagens Berman
- Team Katusha
- Lampre–Merida
- Lotto–Belisol
- Mexico (national team)
- Movistar Team
- NetApp–Endura
- Omega Pharma–Quick-Step
- Orica–GreenEDGE
- San Luis Somos Todos
- Saxo–Tinkoff
- UnitedHealthcare
- Vini Fantini–Selle Italia

== Stages ==
=== Stage 1 ===
21 January 2013 — San Luis to Villa Mercedes, 164 km (101.9 mi)

The first stage contained no major difficulties, with the only categorised climb of the 164 km (101.9 mi) parcours being a Category 3 climb, the Alto Saladillo, situated 55 km (34 mi) from the start. From that point, the course was mostly a descending false flat to the finish in Villa Mercedes.

A breakaway of seven riders racing for non-World Tour teams formed and enjoyed a lead of eight minutes as they crested the Alto Saladillo. Flavio de Luna from a Mexican selective team was the first atop the climb, which earned him the red jersey for the mountains classification leader at the end of the stage. Upon the descent, the sprinters' teams Omega Pharma–Quick-Step, Cannondale, Androni Giocattoli–Venezuela and Lampre–Merida took station at the front of the peloton, bringing the escapees' advantage down to four minutes with 55 km (34 mi) remaining. The remnants of the break were ultimately caught in the closing stages, setting up a bunch sprint finish. Peter Sagan tried to lead-out his teammate Lucas Sebastián Haedo to the line, but a crash occurred in the final 500 metres (1,600 feet) stunting most teams' lead-outs. Mark Cavendish avoided the incident, launching from the Lampre–Merida train and won clearly, ahead of rivals Sacha Modolo and Alessandro Petacchi, to take a début victory for his new team, Omega Pharma–Quick-Step.

Stage 1 Result

	Rider	Team	Time
1	Mark Cavendish (GBR)	Omega Pharma–Quick-Step	3h 48' 04"
2	Sacha Modolo (ITA)	Bardiani Valvole–CSF Inox	s.t.
3	Alessandro Petacchi (ITA)	Lampre–Merida	s.t.
4	Leigh Howard (AUS)	Orica–GreenEDGE	s.t.
5	Peter Sagan (SVK)	Cannondale	s.t.
6	Rafael Andriato (BRA)	Vini Fantini–Selle Italia	s.t.
7	Francesco Lasca (ITA)	Caja Rural	s.t.
8	Thor Hushovd (NOR)	BMC Racing Team	s.t.
9	Kenny Dehaes (BEL)	Lotto–Belisol	s.t.
10	Miguel Ángel Rubiano (COL)	Androni Giocattoli–Venezuela	s.t.

General Classification after Stage 1

	Rider	Team	Time
1	Mark Cavendish (GBR)	Omega Pharma–Quick-Step	3h 48' 04"
2	Sacha Modolo (ITA)	Bardiani Valvole–CSF Inox	+ 0"
3	Alessandro Petacchi (ITA)	Lampre–Merida	+ 0"
4	Leigh Howard (AUS)	Orica–GreenEDGE	+ 0"
5	Peter Sagan (SVK)	Cannondale	+ 0"
6	Rafael Andriato (BRA)	Vini Fantini–Selle Italia	+ 0"
7	Francesco Lasca (ITA)	Caja Rural	+ 0"
8	Thor Hushovd (NOR)	BMC Racing Team	+ 0"
9	Kenny Dehaes (BEL)	Lotto–Belisol	+ 0"
10	Miguel Ángel Rubiano (COL)	Androni Giocattoli–Venezuela	+ 0"

=== Stage 2 ===
22 January 2013 — Tilisarao to Terrazas del Portezuelo, 171.4 km (106.5 mi)

The parcours for the second stage was relatively similar to the previous stage, with only one categorised climb – the third-category Alto Paso Grande coming in the first third of the race – during its 171.4 km (106.5 mi) itinerary. The finish at Terrazas del Portezuelo provided the riders with a twisty uphill finish, but was still expected to provide a sprint finish.

A five-rider move went clear after 8 km (5.0 mi) of racing, including Emmanuel Guevara of local team San Luis Somos Todos, who was first atop the only climb of the day, moving him level on points with the mountains classification leader, Flavio de Luna. Guevara later had to depart from the breakaway due to him feeling unwell. Nevertheless, the break enjoyed a maximum lead of almost five minutes, but was reeled in mostly by the Cannondale and Omega Pharma–Quick-Step teams. Sacha Modolo of Bardiani Valvole–CSF Inox derailed the big teams' plans as he beat rivals Mark Cavendish and Leigh Howard in the sprint. Modolo confided afterward that he learned the finish was uphill during the race while chatting with other riders, as he first thought it would be flat. Along with the victory, Modolo assumed the leader's jersey from Cavendish, on countback.

Stage 2 Result

	Rider	Team	Time
1	Sacha Modolo (ITA)	Bardiani Valvole–CSF Inox	3h 50' 08"
2	Mark Cavendish (GBR)	Omega Pharma–Quick-Step	s.t.
3	Leigh Howard (AUS)	Orica–GreenEDGE	s.t.
4	Jens Debusschere (BEL)	Lotto–Belisol	s.t.
5	Peter Sagan (SVK)	Cannondale	s.t.
6	Alessandro Petacchi (ITA)	Lampre–Merida	s.t.
7	Francesco Chicchi (ITA)	Vini Fantini–Selle Italia	s.t.
8	Manuel Belletti (ITA)	Ag2r–La Mondiale	s.t.
9	Francesco Lasca (ITA)	Caja Rural	s.t.
10	Scott Thwaites (GBR)	NetApp–Endura	s.t.

General Classification after Stage 2

	Rider	Team	Time
1	Sacha Modolo (ITA)	Bardiani Valvole–CSF Inox	7h 38' 12"
2	Mark Cavendish (GBR)	Omega Pharma–Quick-Step	+ 0"
3	Leigh Howard (AUS)	Orica–GreenEDGE	+ 0"
4	Alessandro Petacchi (ITA)	Lampre–Merida	+ 0"
5	Peter Sagan (SVK)	Cannondale	+ 0"
6	Francesco Lasca (ITA)	Caja Rural	+ 0"
7	Manuel Belletti (ITA)	Ag2r–La Mondiale	+ 0"
8	Jacob Keough (USA)	UnitedHealthcare	+ 0"
9	Miguel Ángel Rubiano (COL)	Androni Giocattoli–Venezuela	+ 0"
10	Enzo Moyano (ARG)	Caja Rural	+ 0"

=== Stage 3 ===
23 January 2013 — La Punta to Mirador del Potrero, 173.1 km (107.6 mi)

Stage 3 was denoted as the queen stage of the race, and included two categorised climbs in the opening half of the stage; a third-category climb was followed by the first-category Alto de Nogoli climb, at the midway point. The stage continued up to a summit finish, on the first-category Mirador del Potrero, above Lake Potrero de los Funes.

A breakaway of seven riders went clear early on, and included San Luis Somos Todos teammates Jorge Giacinti and Leandro Messineo. Giacinti was the first rider to cross each of the first two climbs of the day in front, collecting enough points to take the mountains classification jersey. Messineo would also join Giacinti during the post-stage ceremonies, as he won the two intermediate sprints of the stage, which was sufficient to take the sprint classification jersey from Walter Pérez. The breakaway was eventually caught by a group of forty riders with 30 kilometres (19 mi) to go.

At the foot of the 8 kilometres (5.0 mi) long Mirador del Potrero ascent, Alex Correia Diniz of Funvic Brasilinvest–São José dos Campos attacked and maintained a slight advantage on the chasers throughout the climb itself, as the gradient increased. The chase was led by a small group which dropped pre-race favourites Alberto Contador (Saxo–Tinkoff), Vincenzo Nibali (Astana) and Joaquim Rodríguez (Team Katusha) among others. Diniz held on to cross the finish line solo with an advantage of 24 seconds over his closest rival, Mauro Santambrogio of Vini Fantini–Selle Italia. With that victory, Diniz took the lead in the overall classification from overnight leader Sacha Modolo, stating that his result was "huge" for Brazilian cycling.

Stage 3 Result

	Rider	Team	Time
1	Alex Correia Diniz (BRA)	Funvic Brasilinvest–São José dos Campos	4h 29' 36"
2	Mauro Santambrogio (ITA)	Vini Fantini–Selle Italia	+ 24"
3	Michał Kwiatkowski (POL)	Omega Pharma–Quick-Step	+ 24"
4	Bart De Clercq (BEL)	Lotto–Belisol	+ 25"
5	Tejay van Garderen (USA)	BMC Racing Team	+ 25"
6	Jurgen Van den Broeck (BEL)	Lotto–Belisol	+ 25"
7	Daniel Díaz (ARG)	San Luis Somos Todos	+ 29"
8	Diego Ulissi (ITA)	Lampre–Merida	+ 34"
9	Miguel Ángel Rubiano (COL)	Androni Giocattoli–Venezuela	+ 34"
10	André Cardoso (POR)	Caja Rural	+ 34"

General Classification after Stage 3

	Rider	Team	Time
1	Alex Correia Diniz (BRA)	Funvic Brasilinvest–São José dos Campos	12h 07' 48"
2	Mauro Santambrogio (ITA)	Vini Fantini–Selle Italia	+ 24"
3	Michał Kwiatkowski (POL)	Omega Pharma–Quick-Step	+ 24"
4	Jurgen Van den Broeck (BEL)	Lotto–Belisol	+ 25"
5	Bart De Clercq (BEL)	Lotto–Belisol	+ 25"
6	Tejay van Garderen (USA)	BMC Racing Team	+ 25"
7	Daniel Díaz (ARG)	San Luis Somos Todos	+ 29"
8	Miguel Ángel Rubiano (COL)	Androni Giocattoli–Venezuela	+ 34"
9	André Cardoso (POR)	Caja Rural	+ 34"
10	Diego Ulissi (ITA)	Lampre–Merida	+ 34"

=== Stage 4 ===
24 January 2013 — San Luis, 19.2 km (11.9 mi), individual time trial (ITT)

The individual time trial stage was mainly flat, with an elevation change of 100 metres (330 ft) over the first 10 kilometres (6.2 mi), at which point the riders took a 180-degree hairpin turn and rode the course in the opposite direction, back to the starting point.

Canadian Svein Tuft (Orica–GreenEDGE) prevailed with a time of 22' 14", with sprints classification leader Leandro Messineo taking second place, seven seconds behind Tuft. The overall classification leader changed once again as Michał Kwiatkowski (Omega Pharma–Quick-Step) recorded the third-fastest time for the course and claimed the race's lead from Alex Correia Diniz of Funvic Brasilinvest–São José dos Campos. At the 10 kilometres (6.2 mi) point, Kwiatkowski had recorded the fastest time, some eleven seconds quicker than Tuft, however Tuft's second element of the stage allowed him to move up to the stage victory. After his victory, Tuft said that the wind was a major factor on the course.

Stage 4 Result

	Rider	Team	Time
1	Svein Tuft (CAN)	Orica–GreenEDGE	22' 14"
2	Leandro Messineo (ARG)	San Luis Somos Todos	+ 7"
3	Michał Kwiatkowski (POL)	Omega Pharma–Quick-Step	+ 11"
4	Vincenzo Nibali (ITA)	Astana	+ 14"
5	Adriano Malori (ITA)	Lampre–Merida	+ 19"
6	Jorge Giacinti (ARG)	San Luis Somos Todos	+ 26"
7	Tejay van Garderen (USA)	BMC Racing Team	+ 33"
8	Eloy Teruel (ESP)	Movistar Team	+ 34"
9	Sylvain Chavanel (FRA)	Omega Pharma–Quick-Step	+ 47"
10	Jurgen Van den Broeck (BEL)	Lotto–Belisol	+ 52"

General Classification after Stage 4

	Rider	Team	Time
1	Michał Kwiatkowski (POL)	Omega Pharma–Quick-Step	12h 30' 37"
2	Tejay van Garderen (USA)	BMC Racing Team	+ 23"
3	Jurgen Van den Broeck (BEL)	Lotto–Belisol	+ 42"
4	Alex Correia Diniz (BRA)	Funvic Brasilinvest–São José dos Campos	+ 45"
5	Bart De Clercq (BEL)	Lotto–Belisol	+ 54"
6	Alberto Contador (ESP)	Saxo–Tinkoff	+ 1' 10"
7	Daniel Díaz (ARG)	San Luis Somos Todos	+ 1' 12"
8	Diego Ulissi (ITA)	Lampre–Merida	+ 1' 12"
9	Sylvain Chavanel (FRA)	Omega Pharma–Quick-Step	+ 1' 24"
10	Jesús Herrada (ESP)	Movistar Team	+ 1' 24"

=== Stage 5 ===
25 January 2013 — Juana Koslay to Carolina, 169.8 km (105.5 mi)

The first 130 kilometres (81 mi) of Stage 5 were mostly flat, before two categorised climbs within the final 40 kilometres (25 mi). A third-category climb was immediately followed by the first-category Cerro al Amago ascent, a climb of 10.5 kilometres (6.5 mi) in length with an average gradient of 7.2%. The terrain then became mostly flat until the finish line in Carolina.

Emmanuel Guevara of San Luis Somos Todos and Vojtěch Hačecký of ASC Dukla Praha broke away early and were given some freedom by the peloton since neither rider was a threat for the overall classification. Enjoying the tailwind, the duo had a maximum gap of seventeen minutes. Guevara dropped Hačecký on the slopes of the Cerro al Amago, and still had an advantage of fifteen minutes with 24 kilometres (15 mi) to go. The bunch tackled with the climb and BMC Racing Team put the pressure on, working for their leader Tejay van Garderen, who had been in second place in the general classification overnight, 23 seconds behind the leader Michał Kwiatkowski of Omega Pharma–Quick-Step. Kwiatkowski himself was struggling on the climb, and was soon distanced, and ensured that the leader's jersey would change hands again. Alberto Contador and Daniel Díaz attacked, but Contador could not sustain the tempo set by Díaz, and fell back to the small group containing van Garderen. Díaz almost made the junction with his fading teammate Guevara, finishing fifteen seconds behind. Guevara barely had the strength for a victory salute, as he crossed the line by swerving dangerously. The stage was a double success for their San Luis Somos Todos team, since Díaz had gained enough time to move in the first spot of the general classification.

Stage 5 Result

	Rider	Team	Time
1	Emmanuel Guevara (ARG)	San Luis Somos Todos	4h 17' 48"
2	Daniel Díaz (ARG)	San Luis Somos Todos	+ 15"
3	Miguel Ángel Rubiano (COL)	Androni Giocattoli–Venezuela	+ 1' 17"
4	Arnold Alcolea (CUB)	Cuba (national team)	+ 1' 17"
5	Janier Acevedo (COL)	Jamis–Hagens Berman	+ 1' 21"
6	Tejay van Garderen (USA)	BMC Racing Team	+ 1' 21"
7	Alberto Contador (ESP)	Saxo–Tinkoff	+ 1' 21"
8	Alex Correia Diniz (BRA)	Funvic Brasilinvest–São José dos Campos	+ 1' 21"
9	Mauro Santambrogio (ITA)	Vini Fantini–Selle Italia	+ 1' 41"
10	Matteo Montaguti (ITA)	Ag2r–La Mondiale	+ 1' 42"

General Classification after Stage 5

	Rider	Team	Time
1	Daniel Díaz (ARG)	San Luis Somos Todos	16h 49' 52"
2	Tejay van Garderen (USA)	BMC Racing Team	+ 17"
3	Alex Correia Diniz (BRA)	Funvic Brasilinvest–São José dos Campos	+ 39"
4	Alberto Contador (ESP)	Saxo–Tinkoff	+ 1' 04"
5	Jurgen Van den Broeck (BEL)	Lotto–Belisol	+ 1' 07"
6	Miguel Ángel Rubiano (COL)	Androni Giocattoli–Venezuela	+ 1' 47"
7	Vincenzo Nibali (ITA)	Astana	+ 2' 14"
8	Mauro Santambrogio (ITA)	Vini Fantini–Selle Italia	+ 2' 17"
9	Michał Kwiatkowski (POL)	Omega Pharma–Quick-Step	+ 2' 19"
10	Janier Acevedo (COL)	Jamis–Hagens Berman	+ 2' 20"

=== Stage 6 ===
26 January 2013 — Quines to Merlo–Mirador del Sol, 156.6 km (97.3 mi)

Stage 6 was the last mountain stage of the Tour. It contained three categorised climbs, starting with the second-category Alto de Cantana in the first half of the race. The course was then undulating until the uphill finish, commencing with a third-category climb immediately followed by the first-category Mirador del Sol, a 7 km (4.3 mi) long ascent at an average gradient of 8.75%. It was being used in the race for the second consecutive year as a summit finish, as in 2012, Alberto Contador won ahead of Daniel Díaz, but was later stripped of the result.

A breakaway of four riders formed, consisting of Marc de Maar (UnitedHealthcare), Mauro Finetto (Vini Fantini–Selle Italia), Adriano Malori (Lampre–Merida) and Pieter Weening (Orica–GreenEDGE). Diego Rosa (Androni Giocattoli–Venezuela) joined them later on, and the group maintained an advantage of three minutes over much of the course, until they were caught at the foot of the Mirador del Sol. Nicki Sørensen of Saxo–Tinkoff was the first to attack on the climb, but was brought back by the BMC Racing Team-led field who tried to isolate Díaz for their leader Tejay van Garderen; van Garderen attacked himself, but could not distance Díaz. The group was reduced to about a dozen riders when Contador accelerated in sight of the flamme rouge, creating a sizable gap. Díaz managed to get back to him, before Contador kicked again in the closing stages to win, but Díaz followed him, just two seconds in arrears. Funvic Brasilinvest–São José dos Campos rider Alex Correia Diniz caught the duo shortly before the finish line, and also finished two seconds back. Van Garderen, second in the overall classification, lost eighteen seconds to Contador and found himself 33 seconds in arrears of Díaz, with Diniz a close third at 39 seconds.

Stage 6 Result

	Rider	Team	Time
1	Alberto Contador (ESP)	Saxo–Tinkoff	3h 47' 34"
2	Daniel Díaz (ARG)	San Luis Somos Todos	+ 2"
3	Alex Correia Diniz (BRA)	Funvic Brasilinvest–São José dos Campos	+ 2"
4	Arnold Alcolea (CUB)	Cuba (national team)	+ 14"
5	Mauro Santambrogio (ITA)	Vini Fantini–Selle Italia	+ 14"
6	Tejay van Garderen (USA)	BMC Racing Team	+ 18"
7	Fabio Aru (ITA)	Astana	+ 25"
8	Matteo Montaguti (ITA)	Ag2r–La Mondiale	+ 30"
9	João Mendes (POR)	NetApp–Endura	+ 34"
10	Jurgen Van den Broeck (BEL)	Lotto–Belisol	+ 42"

General Classification after Stage 6

	Rider	Team	Time
1	Daniel Díaz (ARG)	San Luis Somos Todos	20h 37' 28"
2	Tejay van Garderen (USA)	BMC Racing Team	+ 33"
3	Alex Correia Diniz (BRA)	Funvic Brasilinvest–São José dos Campos	+ 39"
4	Alberto Contador (ESP)	Saxo–Tinkoff	+ 1' 02"
5	Jurgen Van den Broeck (BEL)	Lotto–Belisol	+ 1' 47"
6	Mauro Santambrogio (ITA)	Vini Fantini–Selle Italia	+ 2' 29"
7	Miguel Ángel Rubiano (COL)	Androni Giocattoli–Venezuela	+ 2' 34"
8	Janier Acevedo (COL)	Jamis–Hagens Berman	+ 3' 00"
9	Bart De Clercq (BEL)	Lotto–Belisol	+ 3' 14"
10	Vincenzo Nibali (ITA)	Astana	+ 3' 17"

=== Stage 7 ===
27 January 2013 — San Luis to Juana Koslay, 154.7 km (96.1 mi)

The last stage of the race was held over a slightly undulating course which included only one categorised climb; a third-category ascent situated 17 kilometres (11 mi) from the start.

Going into the stage, the mountains classification was led by Emmanuel Guevara, but he had the same number of points (16) as Alex Correia Diniz, meaning the only categorised climb would determine the winner of that competition. However, neither rider were in a position to score points; thus Guevara won the King of the Mountains competition of the Tour.

The breakaway of the day was composed of eight riders, with Michał Kwiatkowski the best-ranked overall in the general classification, 3' 32" behind race leader Daniel Díaz. Later on, three chasers made the junction, and their lead peaked at 3' 40" with 59 kilometres (37 mi) to go, making Kwiatkowski the virtual leader for a limited amount of time. The teams of the general classification leaders started to work in a concerted effort at the front of the peloton and with 16 kilometres (9.9 mi) to go, the break was nullified. The finishing mass sprint was won by Mattia Gavazzi (Androni Giocattoli–Venezuela), his first victory since returning from a 30-month doping ban; his last victory came at the Settimana Ciclistica Lombarda in 2010. Díaz finished with the main group, and won the overall classification. His team, San Luis Somos Todos, enjoyed other successes; adding to Guevara's mountains victory, Leandro Messineo won the sprints classification.

Stage 7 Result

	Rider	Team	Time
1	Mattia Gavazzi (ITA)	Androni Giocattoli–Venezuela	3h 25' 48"
2	Peter Sagan (SVK)	Cannondale	s.t.
3	Francisco Ventoso (ESP)	Movistar Team	s.t.
4	Maximiliano Richeze (ARG)	Lampre–Merida	s.t.
5	Bartłomiej Matysiak (POL)	CCC–Polsat–Polkowice	s.t.
6	Juan José Haedo (ARG)	Jamis–Hagens Berman	s.t.
7	Sacha Modolo (ITA)	Bardiani Valvole–CSF Inox	s.t.
8	Manuel Belletti (ITA)	Ag2r–La Mondiale	s.t.
9	Sebastián Tolosa (ARG)	Buenos Aires Provincia	s.t.
10	Jens Debusschere (BEL)	Lotto–Belisol	s.t.

Final General Classification

	Rider	Team	Time
1	Daniel Díaz (ARG)	San Luis Somos Todos	24h 03' 16"
2	Tejay van Garderen (USA)	BMC Racing Team	+ 33"
3	Alex Correia Diniz (BRA)	Funvic Brasilinvest–São José dos Campos	+ 39"
4	Alberto Contador (ESP)	Saxo–Tinkoff	+ 1' 02"
5	Jurgen Van den Broeck (BEL)	Lotto–Belisol	+ 1' 47"
6	Mauro Santambrogio (ITA)	Vini Fantini–Selle Italia	+ 2' 29"
7	Miguel Ángel Rubiano (COL)	Androni Giocattoli–Venezuela	+ 2' 34"
8	Janier Acevedo (COL)	Jamis–Hagens Berman	+ 3' 00"
9	Bart De Clercq (BEL)	Lotto–Belisol	+ 3' 14"
10	Vincenzo Nibali (ITA)	Astana	+ 3' 17"

== Classification leadership table ==
Stage	Winner	General Classification	Mountains Classification	Sprint Classification	Young Rider Classification	Team Classification
1	Mark Cavendish	Mark Cavendish	Flavio de Luna	Walter Pérez	Lucas Gaday	Cannondale
2	Sacha Modolo	Sacha Modolo	Flavio de Luna	Walter Pérez	Lucas Gaday	Cannondale
3	Alex Correia Diniz	Alex Correia Diniz	Jorge Giacinti	Leandro Messineo	Alejandro Sivori	Astana
4	Svein Tuft	Michał Kwiatkowski	Jorge Giacinti	Leandro Messineo	Alejandro Sivori	Omega Pharma–Quick-Step
5	Emmanuel Guevara	Daniel Díaz	Emmanuel Guevara	Leandro Messineo	Alejandro Sivori	San Luis Somos Todos
6	Alberto Contador	Daniel Díaz	Emmanuel Guevara	Leandro Messineo	Alejandro Sivori	BMC Racing Team
7	Mattia Gavazzi	Daniel Díaz	Emmanuel Guevara	Leandro Messineo	Alejandro Sivori	BMC Racing Team
Final		Daniel Díaz	Emmanuel Guevara	Leandro Messineo	Alejandro Sivori	BMC Racing Team
