= 2014 in cycle sport =

== BMX racing ==
- April 18 – September 27: 2014 UCI BMX Supercross World Cup
  - April 18 & 19 in (United Kingdom) Manchester
    - Men's Elite winner: (United Kingdom) Liam Phillips
    - Women's Elite winner: (Australia) Caroline Buchanan
  - May 10 & 11 in (Netherlands) Papendal
    - Men's Elite winner: (Australia) Sam Willoughby
    - Women's Elite winner: (Netherlands) Laura Smulders
  - June 13 & 14 in (Germany) Berlin
    - Men's Elite winner: (Latvia) Māris Štrombergs
    - Women's Elite winner: (Australia) Caroline Buchanan
  - September 6 & 7 in (Argentina) Santiago del Estero
    - Men's Elite winner: (Latvia) Māris Štrombergs
    - Women's Elite winner: (Colombia) Mariana Pajón
  - September 26 & 27 in (United States) Chula Vista, California (final)
    - Men's Elite winner: (Australia) Sam Willoughby
    - Women's Elite winner: (Colombia) Mariana Pajón
- July 23–27: 2014 UCI BMX World Championships in (Netherlands) Rotterdam
  - Men's Elite winner: (Australia) Sam Willoughby
  - Women's Elite winner: (Colombia) Mariana Pajón

== Cyclo-cross biking ==
- October 20, 2013 – January 26, 2014: 2014 UCI Cyclo-cross World Cup
  - October 20, 2013, at (Netherlands) Valkenburg
    - Men's Elite winner: (Netherlands) Lars van der Haar
    - Women's Elite winner: (Netherlands) Marianne Vos
  - October 26, 2013, at (Czech Republic) Tábor
    - Men's Elite winner: (Netherlands) Lars van der Haar
    - Women's Elite winner: (United States) Katie Compton
  - November 23, 2013, at (Belgium) Koksijde
    - Men's Elite winner: (Belgium) Niels Albert
    - Women's Elite winner: (United States) Katie Compton
  - December 22, 2013, at (Belgium) Namur
    - Men's Elite winner: (France) Francis Mourey
    - Women's Elite winner: (United States) Katie Compton
  - December 26, 2013, at (Belgium) Heusden-Zolder
    - Men's Elite winner: (Netherlands) Lars van der Haar
    - Women's Elite winner: (United States) Katie Compton
  - January 5, 2014, at (Italy) Rome
    - Men's Elite winner: (Belgium) Niels Albert
    - Women's Elite winner: (United States) Katie Compton
  - January 26, 2014, at (France) Nommay
    - Men's Elite winner: (Belgium) Tom Meeusen
    - Women's Elite winner: (Netherlands) Marianne Vos
- February 1 & 2: 2014 UCI Cyclo-cross World Championships at (Netherlands) Hoogerheide
  - Men's Elite winner: (Czech Republic) Zdeněk Štybar
  - Women's Elite winner: (Netherlands) Marianne Vos

== Mountain biking ==
- April 10 – August 24: 2014 UCI Mountain Bike World Cup
  - April 10 – 13 in (South Africa) Pietermaritzburg
    - Men's XC winner: (France) Julien Absalon
    - Men's downhill winner: (United States) Aaron Gwin
    - Women's XC winner: (Switzerland) Jolanda Neff
    - Women's downhill winner: (United Kingdom) Manon Carpenter
  - April 24 – 27 in (Australia) Cairns
    - Men's Eliminator winner: (New Zealand) Samuel Gaze
    - Men's XC winner: (France) Julien Absalon
    - Men's downhill winner: (United Kingdom) Gee Atherton
    - Women's Eliminator winner: (Sweden) Alexandra Engen
    - Women's XC winner: (Italy) Eva Lechner
    - Women's downhill winner: (United Kingdom) Rachel Atherton
  - May 23 – 25 in (Czech Republic) Nové Město na Moravě
    - Men's Eliminator winner: (Slovenia) Miha Halzer
    - Men's XC winner: (Switzerland) Nino Schurter
    - Women's Eliminator winner: (Sweden) Alexandra Engen
    - Women's XC winner: (France) Pauline Ferrand-Prévot
  - May 30 – June 1 in (Germany) Albstadt
    - Men's Eliminator winner: (Belgium) Fabrice Mels
    - Men's XC winner: (France) Julien Absalon
    - Women's Eliminator winner: (Switzerland) Kathrin Stirnemann
    - Women's XC winner: (France) Pauline Ferrand-Prévot
  - June 7 & 8 in (United Kingdom) Fort William, Scotland (downhill only)
    - Men's Downhill winner: (Australia) Troy Brosnan
    - Women's Downhill winner: (France) Emmeline Ragot
  - June 14 & 15 in (Austria) Leogang (downhill only)
    - Men's Downhill winner: (United Kingdom) Josh Bryceland
    - Women's Downhill winner: (United Kingdom) Manon Carpenter
  - July 31 – August 3 in (Canada) Mont-Sainte-Anne
    - Men's Eliminator winner: (Germany) Simon Gegenheimer
    - Men's XC winner: (Switzerland) Nino Schurter
    - Men's Downhill winner: (Australia) Sam Hill
    - Women's Eliminator winner: (Switzerland) Kathrin Stirnemann
    - Women's XC winner: (Switzerland) Jolanda Neff
    - Women's Downhill winner: (United Kingdom) Manon Carpenter
  - August 7–10 in (United States) Windham, New York
    - Men's Eliminator winner: (Argentina) Catriel Soto
    - Men's XC winner: (Switzerland) Nino Schurter
    - Men's Downhill winner: (United Kingdom) Josh Bryceland
    - Women's Eliminator winner: (Sweden) Jenny Rissveds
    - Women's XC winner: (Canada) Catharine Pendrel
    - Women's Downhill winner: (France) Emmeline Ragot
  - August 21–24 in (France) Méribel (final)
    - Men's Eliminator winner: (Belgium) Fabrice Mels
    - Men's XC winner: (Switzerland) Nino Schurter
    - Men's Downhill winner: (Australia) Sam Hill
    - Women's Eliminator winner: (Switzerland) Linda Indergand
    - Women's XC winner: (Switzerland) Jolanda Neff
    - Women's Downhill winner: (United Kingdom) Rachel Atherton
- June 13 & 14: 2014 4X World Championships at (Austria) Leogang
  - Men's winner: (Czech Republic) Tomáš Slavík
  - Women's winner: (United Kingdom) Katy Curd
- June 29: 2014 UCI Mountain Bike Marathon World Championships at (South Africa) Pietermaritzburg
  - Men's winner: (Czech Republic) Jaroslav Kulhavý
  - Women's winner: (Denmark) Annika Langvad
- September 3–7: 2014 UCI Mountain Bike & Trials World Championships at (Norway) Hafjell–Lillehammer
  - Men's Eliminator winner: (Belgium) Fabrice Mels
  - Men's XC winner: (France) Julien Absalon
  - Men's Downhill winner: (United Kingdom) Gee Atherton
  - Women's Eliminator winner: (Switzerland) Kathrin Stirnemann
  - Women's XC winner: (Canada) Catharine Pendrel
  - Women's Downhill winner: (United Kingdom) Manon Carpenter

== Road cycling ==
- January 21 – October 14: 2014 UCI World Tour
  - Overall winner: (Spain) Alejandro Valverde ( (Spain) Movistar Team)
- March 15 – August 30: 2014 UCI Women's Road World Cup
  - Overall winner: (United Kingdom) Lizzie Armitstead ( (Netherlands) Boels–Dolmans Cycling Team)

=== Grand Tour ===
- May 9 – June 1: 2014 Giro d'Italia
  - Winner: (Colombia) Nairo Quintana (first Grand Tour win)
- July 5–27: 2014 Tour de France
  - Winner: (Italy) Vincenzo Nibali (won all three Grand Tour events)
- August 23 – September 14: 2014 Vuelta a España
  - Winner: (Spain) Alberto Contador (third Vuelta win; winner of all three Grand Tour events since 2008)

=== Monuments one-day events ===
- January 21–26: 2014 Tour Down Under
  - Winner: (Australia) Simon Gerrans; Second: (Australia) Cadel Evans; Third: (Italy) Diego Ulissi
- March 23: 2014 Milan–San Remo
  - Winner: (Norway) Alexander Kristoff; Second: (Switzerland) Fabian Cancellara; Third: (United Kingdom) Ben Swift
- April 6: 2014 Ronde van Vlaanderen (also called the Tour of Flanders)
  - Winner: (Switzerland) Fabian Cancellara; Second: (Belgium) Greg Van Avermaet; Third: (Belgium) Sep Vanmarcke
- April 13: 2014 Paris–Roubaix
  - Winner: (Netherlands) Niki Terpstra; Second: (Germany) John Degenkolb; Third: (Switzerland) Fabian Cancellara
- April 27: 2014 Liège–Bastogne–Liège
  - Winner: (Australia) Simon Gerrans; Second: (Spain) Alejandro Valverde; Third: (Poland) Michał Kwiatkowski
- October 5: 2014 Giro di Lombardia
  - Winner: (Republic of Ireland) Dan Martin; Second: (Spain) Alejandro Valverde; Third: (Portugal) Rui Costa

=== UCI Continental Circuits ===
- January 10 -: 2013–14 UCI America Tour
  - January 10–19: Vuelta al Táchira en Bicicleta in Venezuela
    - Stages:
      Stage 1: Guanare to Barinas
      W: (Italy) Rino Gasparrini
      Stage 2: Socopó to Táriba
      W: (Venezuela) Yonatan Salinas
      Stage 3: San Cristóbal (circuit)
      W: (Venezuela) Juan Murillo
      Stage 4: Lobatera to Santa Cruz de Mora
      W: (Venezuela) Jhonathan Camargo
      Stage 5 Lagunillas to La Grita
      W: (Venezuela) Jimmy Briceño
      Stage 6: La Fría to Coloncito (I. T. T.)
      W: (Italy) Andrea Dal Col
      Stage 7: Coloncito to Colón
      W: (Venezuela) Jhonathan Camargo
      Stage 8: Seboruco to Cerro de Cristo
      W: (Venezuela) Jhonathan Camargo
      Stage 9: El Piñal to Casa del Padre
      W: (Venezuela) Jhonathan Camargo
      Stage 10: Rubio (circuit) to San Cristóbal
      W: (Colombia) Pedro Herrera
    - General classification:
      (gold) : (Venezuela) Jimmy Briceño
      (silver) : (Venezuela) Carlos Galvis
      (bronze) : (Venezuela) Juan Murillo
  - January 20–26: Tour de San Luis in Argentina
    - Stages:
      Stage 1: San Luis to Villa Mercedes
      W: (United States) Phil Gaimon
      Stage 2: La Punta to Mirador del Potrero de los Funes
      W: (Colombia) Julián Arredondo
      Stage 3: Tilisarao to Juana Koslay
      W: (Italy) Giacomo Nizzolo
      Stage 4: El Potrero de los Funes to Alto del Amago
      W: (Colombia) Nairo Quintana
      Stage 5: San Luis (I. T. T.)
      W: (Italy) Adriano Malori
      Stage 6: Las Chacras to Villa de Merlo
      W: (Colombia) Julián Arredondo
      Stage 7: San Luis to Terrazas del Portezuelo
      W: (Italy) Sacha Modolo
    - General classification:
      (gold) : (Colombia) Nairo Quintana
      (silver) : (United States) Phil Gaimon
      (bronze) : (Argentina) Sergio Godoy
- January 13 -: 2013–14 UCI Africa Tour
  - January 13–19: La Tropicale Amissa Bongo in Gabon
    - winner: (Eritrea) Natnael Berhane
- January 13 -: 2014 UCI Oceania Tour
  - January 29 – February 2: New Zealand Cycle Classic in New Zealand
    - winner: (New Zealand) Michael Vink
  - February 5–9: Herald Sun Tour in Australia
    - winner: (Australia) Simon Clarke
- February 2 -: 2014 UCI Europe Tour
  - February 2: G.P. Costa degli Etruschi in Italy
    - winner: (Italy) Simone Ponzi
  - February 2: Grand Prix Cycliste la Marseillaise in France
    - winner: (Belgium) Kenneth Vanbilsen
  - February 5–9: Étoile de Bessèges in France
    - winner: (Sweden) Tobias Ludvigsson
- February 5 -: 2013–14 UCI Asia Tour
  - February 5–8: Dubai Tour in United Arab Emirates
    - winner: (United States) Taylor Phinney

=== Other ===
- August 17–24: 2014 Summer Youth Olympics
  - Note: Boys' and girls' teams only (which includes cross-country, BMX, time trials, and road cycling all together to determine the overall Youth Olympics team winners)
  - Men's Team: (gold) Colombia; (silver) Denmark; (bronze) Netherlands
  - Women's Team: (gold) Italy; (silver) Czech Republic; (bronze) Denmark
  - International Mixed Team Relay: (gold) Czech Republic; (silver) Italy; (bronze) Ukraine
- September 21–28: 2014 UCI Road World Championships in (Spain) Ponferrada
  - Germany won the gold medal tally. Australia won the overall medal tally.

== Track cycling ==
- November 1, 2013 – January 19, 2014: 2013–14 UCI Track Cycling World Cup (Classics)
  - November 1–3, 2013, in (United Kingdom) Manchester
  - Men
    - Sprint winner: (Germany) Robert Förstemann
    - Scratch winner: (Austria) Andreas Müller
    - Omnium winner: (Belgium) Jasper de Buyst
    - Points Race winner: (Republic of Ireland) Martyn Irvine
    - Keirin winner: (France) François Pervis
    - 4 km Individual Pursuit winner: (Italy) Marco Coledan
    - Team Sprint winners: Germany
    - Team Pursuit winners: Great Britain
  - Women
    - Omnium winner: (United Kingdom) Laura Trott
    - Points Race winner: (Canada) Laura Brown
    - Keirin winner: (Germany) Kristina Vogel
    - Sprint winner: (Germany) Kristina Vogel
    - 3 km Individual Pursuit winner: (United Kingdom) Joanna Rowsell
    - Scratch winner: (Poland) Małgorzata Wojtyra
    - Team Sprint winners: Germany
    - Team Pursuit winners: Great Britain
  - December 5–7 in (Mexico) Aguascalientes
  - Men
    - 1 km Time Trial: (France) François Pervis
    - Keirin winner: (United Kingdom) Matthew Crampton
    - Madison winner: (Spain) David Muntaner / Albert Torres
    - Omnium winner: (Australia) Luke Davison
    - Sprint winner: (Australia) Matthew Glaetzer
    - Scratch winner: (United Kingdom) Owain Doull
    - Team Sprint winners: Germany
    - Team Pursuit winners: Australia
  - Women
    - Omnium winner: (United States) Sarah Hammer
    - Sprint winner: (Germany) Kristina Vogel
    - 500m Time Trial winner: (Australia) Anna Meares
    - Keirin winner: (Germany) Kristina Vogel
    - 3 km Individual Pursuit winner: (Australia) Rebecca Wisiak
    - Points Race winner: (Germany) Stephanie Pohl
    - Team Sprint winners: Germany
    - Team Pursuit winners: Great Britain
  - January 17–19 in (Mexico) Guadalajara
  - Men
    - Omnium winner: (Australia) Tirian McManus
    - Sprint winner: (Netherlands) Hugo Haak
    - Madison winner: (New Zealand) Patrick Bevin / Thomas Scully
    - 1 km Time Trial winner: (Australia) Scott Sunderland
    - Keirin winner: (Netherlands) Matthijs Büchli
    - 4 km Individual Pursuit winner: (Netherlands) Jenning Huizenga
    - Points Race winner: (Russia) Kirill Sveshnikov
    - Team Sprint winners: Netherlands
    - Team Pursuit winners: Australia
  - Women
    - Omnium winner: (Poland) Katarzyna Pawłowska
    - Keirin winner: (Hong Kong) Lee Wai Sze
    - Sprint winner: (China) Lin Junhong
    - 500m Time Trial winner: (Russia) Anastasia Voynova
    - Scratch winner: (Hong Kong) DIAO Xiao Juan
    - Team Sprint winners: China
    - Team Pursuit winners: Canada
- August 7–11, 2013: 2013 UCI Juniors Track World Championships in (United Kingdom) Glasgow
  - Australia won both the gold and overall medal tallies.
- October 6–12: 2014 UCI Track Cycling Masters World Championships in (United Kingdom) Manchester
  - Click here for the results.
- February 26 – March 2: 2014 UCI Track Cycling World Championships in (Colombia) Cali
  - France and Germany won 4 gold medals each. Germany and Australia won 8 overall medals each.
- September 8–14: COPACI American Championships 2014 in (Mexico) Aguascalientes
  - Men's Team Pursuit winners: (Colombia) (Juan Seebastan Molano, Brayan Stiven Sanchez, Arles Castro, Jonathan Restrepo)
  - Men's Sprint winner: (Venezuela) Hersony Canelón
  - Men's Team Sprint winners: (Venezuela) (Hersony Canelón, César Marcano, Ángel Pulgar)
  - Men's Keirin winner: (Colombia) Fabián Puerta
  - Men's Omnium winner: (Colombia) Juan Sebastián Molano
  - Women's Sprint winner: (Cuba) Lisandra Guerra
  - Women's Team Pursuit winners: (United States) (Jennifer Valente, Elizabeth Newell, Amber Gaffney, Kimberly Geist)
  - Women's Team Sprint winners: (Colombia) (Diana García, Juliana Gaviria)
  - Women's Keirin winner: (Canada) Monique Sullivan
  - Women's Omnium winner: (Canada) Gillian Carleton
