= Richeze =

Richeze is a surname. Notable people with the surname include:

- Adrián Richeze (born 1989), Argentine cyclist
- Mauro Richeze (born 1985), Argentine cyclist
- Maximiliano Richeze (born 1983), Argentine cyclist
- Roberto Richeze (born 1981), Argentine cyclist and brother of Adrián, Mauro, and Maximiliano
