= 2012 Tour de San Luis =

2011–12 UCI America Tour, race 9 of 27

Race details
- Dates: January 23–29
- Stages: 7
- Distance: 1,051 km (653 mi)

Results
	Winner	Levi Leipheimer (USA)	(Omega Pharma–Quick-Step)
	Second	Daniel Diaz (ARG)	(San Luis Somos Todos)
	Third	Stefan Schumacher (GER)	(Christina Watches–Onfone)
	Mountains	Miguel Ángel Rubiano (COL)	(Androni Giocattoli–Venezuela)
	Youth	Gabriel Juárez (ARG)	(Argentina – national team)
	Sprints	Edwin Ávila (COL)	(Colombia – national team)
	Team	Androni Giocattoli–Venezuela	

The 2012 Tour de San Luis was the 6th edition of the Tour de San Luis stage race. It was part of the 2011–12 UCI America Tour. Levi Leipheimer of Omega Pharma–Quick-Step won the race, mainly in the time-trial, which he won and where he made the difference with second placed Alberto Contador, who did win two mountain stages. With 2 stage wins for Francesco Chicchi and one for Tom Boonen, Omega Pharma–Quick-Step scored an impressive 4 wins out of 7. Italian Elia Viviani also managed to win one stage.

== Teams ==
Twenty-one teams were invited to the 2012 Tour de San Luis: 5 UCI ProTeams, 7 Professional Continental teams, 6 Continental teams and 7 national selection teams.

=== UCI ProTeams ===
- Movistar Team
- Liquigas–Cannondale
- Team Saxo Bank
- Ag2r–La Mondiale
- Omega Pharma–Quick-Step

=== Professional Continental teams ===
- Androni Giocattoli–Venezuela
- Andalucía
- Caja Rural
- Colnago–CSF Bardiani
- Farnese Vini–Selle Italia
- UnitedHealthcare
- Team NetApp

=== Continental teams ===
- San Luis Somos Todos
- Start Cycling Team-Atacama Flowery Desert
- Carmim–Prio
- Colombia-Comcel
- Christina Watches–Onfone
- Funvic–Pindamonhangaba

=== National teams ===
- Team Argentina (10 riders)
- Team Brazil (6 riders)
- Team Colombia (10 riders)
- Team Chile (9 riders)
- Team Cuba (6 riders)
- Team Ecuador (6 riders)
- Team Uruguay (8 riders)

== Schedule ==
Stage	Route	Distance	Date	Winner	Overall Leader
1	San Luis to Villa Mercedes	189.3 km	Monday, January 23	Francesco Chicchi (ITA)	Francesco Chicchi (ITA)
2	Fraga to Juana Koslay	145.3 km	Tuesday, January 24	Francesco Chicchi (ITA)	Francesco Chicchi (ITA)
3	Estancia Grande to Mirador del Portero	168.2 km	Wednesday, January 25	Levi Leipheimer (USA)	Levi Leipheimer (USA)
4 (ITT)	San Luis to San Luis	19.5 km	Thursday, January 26	Levi Leipheimer (USA)	Levi Leipheimer (USA)
5	La Toma to Mirador del Sol	160.6 km	Friday, January 27	Daniel Diaz (ARG)	Levi Leipheimer (USA)
6	Luján to Quines	201 km	Saturday, January 28	Elia Viviani (ITA)	Levi Leipheimer (USA)
7	San Luis to San Luis	167.1 km	Sunday, January 29	Tom Boonen (BEL)	Levi Leipheimer (USA)

== Stages ==
=== Stage 1, San Luis to Villa Mercedes ===
Stage 1 result

	Rider	Team	Time
1	Francesco Chicchi (ITA)	Omega Pharma–Quick-Step	4h 53' 18"
2	Juan José Haedo (ARG)	Team Saxo Bank	s.t.
3	Mauro Richeze (ARG)	Argentina – national team	s.t.
4	Luis Mansilla (CHI)	Chile – national team	s.t.
5	Jimmy Casper (FRA)	Ag2r–La Mondiale	s.t.

General classification after Stage 1

	Rider	Team	Time
1	Francesco Chicchi (ITA)	Omega Pharma–Quick-Step	4h 53' 08"
2	Juan José Haedo (ARG)	Team Saxo Bank	+ 4"
3	Mauro Richeze (ARG)	Argentina – national team	+ 6"
4	Paolo Locatelli (ITA)	Colnago–CSF Bardiani	+ 9"
5	Luis Mansilla (CHI)	Chile – national team	+ 10"

=== Stage 2, Fraga to Juana Koslay ===
Stage 2 result

	Rider	Team	Time
1	Francesco Chicchi (ITA)	Omega Pharma–Quick-Step	3h 22' 40"
2	Tom Boonen (BEL)	Omega Pharma–Quick-Step	s.t.
3	Jacob Keough (USA)	UnitedHealthcare	s.t.
4	Francisco Ventoso (ESP)	Movistar Team	s.t.
5	Jimmy Casper (FRA)	Ag2r–La Mondiale	s.t.

General classification after Stage 2

	Rider	Team	Time
1	Francesco Chicchi (ITA)	Omega Pharma–Quick-Step	8h 15' 38"
2	Juan José Haedo (ARG)	Team Saxo Bank	+ 14"
3	Jacob Keough (USA)	UnitedHealthcare	+ 16"
4	Mauro Richeze (ARG)	Argentina – national team	+ 16"
5	Paolo Locatelli (ITA)	Colnago–CSF Bardiani	+ 19"

=== Stage 3, Estancia Grande to Mirador del Portero ===
Stage 3 result

	Rider	Team	Time
1	Alberto Contador (ESP)	Team Saxo Bank	4h 29' 27"
2	Levi Leipheimer (USA)	Omega Pharma–Quick-Step	s.t.
3	Miguel Ángel Rubiano (COL)	Androni Giocattoli–Venezuela	+ 5"
4	Stefan Schumacher (GER)	Christina Watches–Onfone	+ 9"
5	Daniel Diaz (ARG)	San Luis Somos Todos	+ 12"

General classification after Stage 3

	Rider	Team	Time
1	Alberto Contador (ESP)	Team Saxo Bank	12h 45' 15"
2	Levi Leipheimer (USA)	Omega Pharma–Quick-Step	+ 4"
3	Stefan Schumacher (GER)	Christina Watches–Onfone	+ 19"
4	Daniel Diaz (ARG)	San Luis Somos Todos	+ 22"
5	Vincenzo Nibali (ITA)	Liquigas–Cannondale	+ 36"

=== Stage 4, San Luis to San Luis ===
Stage 4 result

	Rider	Team	Time
1	Levi Leipheimer (USA)	Omega Pharma–Quick-Step	22' 27"
2	Vincenzo Nibali (ITA)	Liquigas–Cannondale	+ 23"
3	Stefan Schumacher (GER)	Christina Watches–Onfone	+ 38"
4	Sylvain Chavanel (FRA)	Omega Pharma–Quick-Step	+ 39"
5	Magno Nazaret (BRA)	Funvic–Pindamonhangaba	+ 44"

General classification after Stage 4

	Rider	Team	Time
1	Levi Leipheimer (USA)	Omega Pharma–Quick-Step	13h 07' 52"
2	Stefan Schumacher (GER)	Christina Watches–Onfone	+ 53"
3	Vincenzo Nibali (ITA)	Liquigas–Cannondale	+ 55"
4	Alberto Contador (ESP)	Team Saxo Bank	+ 57"
5	Sylvain Chavanel (FRA)	Omega Pharma–Quick-Step	+ 1' 20"

=== Stage 5, La Toma to Mirador del Sol ===
Stage 5 result

	Rider	Team	Time
1	Alberto Contador (ESP)	Team Saxo Bank	4h 19' 59"
2	Daniel Diaz (ARG)	San Luis Somos Todos	+ 2"
3	Levi Leipheimer (USA)	Omega Pharma–Quick-Step	+ 5"
4	José Serpa (COL)	Androni Giocattoli–Venezuela	+ 25"
5	Marcos García (ESP)	Caja Rural	+ 44"

General classification after Stage 5

	Rider	Team	Time
1	Levi Leipheimer (USA)	Omega Pharma–Quick-Step	17h 27' 52"
2	Alberto Contador (ESP)	Team Saxo Bank	+ 46"
3	Daniel Diaz (ARG)	San Luis Somos Todos	+ 1' 31"
4	Stefan Schumacher (GER)	Christina Watches–Onfone	+ 1' 36"
5	Vincenzo Nibali (ITA)	Liquigas–Cannondale	+ 1' 50"

=== Stage 6, Luján to Quines ===
Stage 6 result

	Rider	Team	Time
1	Elia Viviani (ITA)	Liquigas–Cannondale	5h 10' 26"
2	Juan José Haedo (ARG)	Team Saxo Bank	s.t.
3	Andrea Guardini (ITA)	Farnese Vini–Selle Italia	s.t.
4	Francisco Ventoso (ESP)	Movistar Team	s.t.
5	Tom Boonen (BEL)	Omega Pharma–Quick-Step	s.t.

General classification after Stage 6

	Rider	Team	Time
1	Levi Leipheimer (USA)	Omega Pharma–Quick-Step	22h 38' 18"
2	Alberto Contador (ESP)	Team Saxo Bank	+ 46"
3	Daniel Diaz (ARG)	San Luis Somos Todos	+ 1' 31"
4	Stefan Schumacher (GER)	Christina Watches–Onfone	+ 1' 35"
5	Vincenzo Nibali (ITA)	Liquigas–Cannondale	+ 1' 50"

=== Stage 7, San Luis to San Luis ===
Stage 7 result

	Rider	Team	Time
1	Tom Boonen (BEL)	Omega Pharma–Quick-Step	3h 54' 37"
2	Andrea Guardini (ITA)	Farnese Vini–Selle Italia	s.t.
3	Maximiliano Richeze (ARG)	Argentina – national team	s.t.
4	Jimmy Casper (FRA)	Ag2r–La Mondiale	s.t.
5	Jacob Keough (USA)	UnitedHealthcare	s.t.

Final classification

	Rider	Team	Time
1	Levi Leipheimer (USA)	Omega Pharma–Quick-Step	26h 32' 55"
2	Alberto Contador (ESP)	Team Saxo Bank	+ 46"
3	Daniel Diaz (ARG)	San Luis Somos Todos	+ 1' 29"
4	Stefan Schumacher (GER)	Christina Watches–Onfone	+ 1' 34"
5	Vincenzo Nibali (ITA)	Liquigas–Cannondale	+ 1' 50"
