= Mattia Gavazzi =

Italian road cyclist

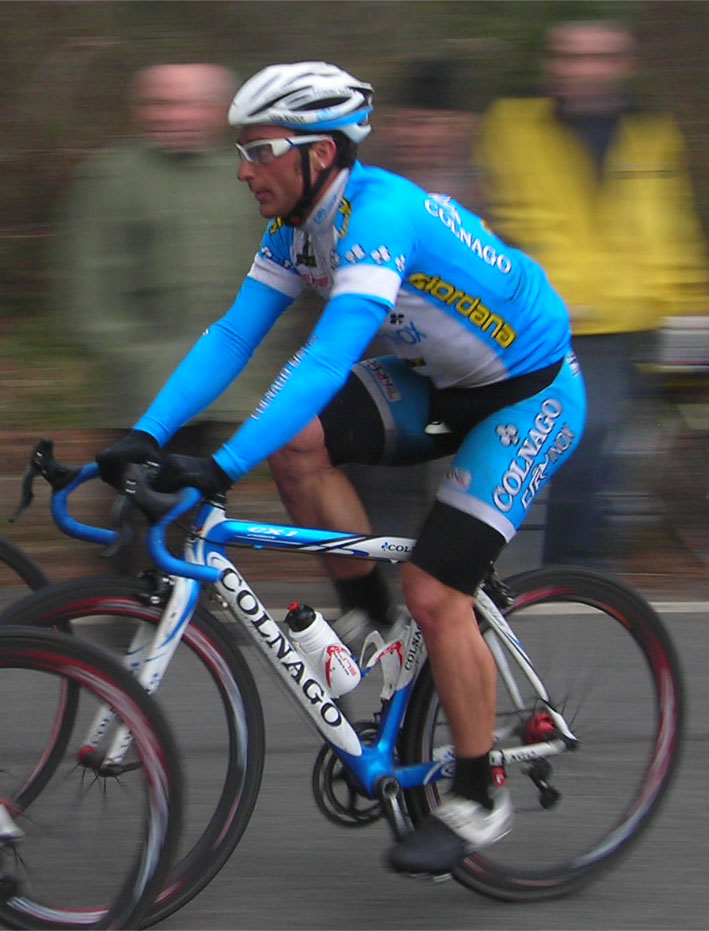

Personal information
- Full name: Mattia Gavazzi
- Born: 14 June 1983 (age 43) Iseo, Italy

Cycling career
- Sport: Cycling
- Discipline: Road
- Role: Rider
- Rider type: Sprinter

Professional teams
- 2006: Team LPR
- 2006: Amore & Vita–McDonald's
- 2007–2008: Kio Ene–Tonazzi–DMT
- 2009: Diquigiovanni–Androni
- 2010: Colnago–CSF Inox
- 2013: Androni Giocattoli–Venezuela
- 2014: Christina Watches–Dana
- 2014–2016: Amore & Vita–Selle SMP

Mattia Gavazzi (born 14 June 1983) is an Italian former road cyclist, who competed professionally between 2006 and 2016 for teams Team LPR, Preti Mangimi, Diquigiovanni–Androni, Colnago–CSF Inox, Androni Giocattoli–Venezuela, Christina Watches–Dana and two spells with Amore & Vita–Selle SMP. In April 2010, Gavazzi was suspended by the Union Cycliste Internationale following a positive doping control for cocaine. He made his comeback in the 2013 Tour de San Luis. He is a specialist sprinter.

== Biography ==
Mattia Gavazzi's father, Pierino Gavazzi, was also a professional rider.

He won a stage at the 2004 Girobio, the version of the Giro d'Italia for young amateur riders. He turned professional in 2006 for Team LPR, but joined the Amore & Vita–McDonald's team midway through the season. Following several good performances, he was signed by Kio Ene–Tonazzi–DMT for the following year. He secured six victories with them in 2007, including three at the Tour de Normandie, showing his talent as a sprinter.

In 2008 he remained with the same team, who became known as Preti Mangimi. In February he achieved a second place in a stage of the Giro della Provincia di Grosseto, behind Danilo Napolitano and in front of Filippo Pozzato. The following month he was again second at the Settimana Internazionale di Coppi e Bartali, beaten by Francesco Chicchi. In April, he won a stage of the Settimana Ciclistica Lombarda, and in May the Giro di Toscana, beating Chicchi.

2009 saw him sign for Diquigiovanni–Androni with immediate success. He won a stage at the Tour de San Luis and dominated at the Tour de Langkawi, winning four stages and the Points classification.

In 2010 he switched to Colnago–CSF Inox and scored his first victory of the year at a Settimana Ciclistica Lombarda stage in early April. However, a urine sample taken two days previously tested positive for the presence of cocaine, and this triggered a suspension by the sport's governing body. He had previously tested positive for cocaine, and received a 14-month suspension, as an amateur in 2004.

Gavazzi made his return at the 2013 Tour de San Luis, where he won the last stage by out sprinting Slovak Peter Sagan (Cannondale). In April, he won the Giro di Toscana, a hilly race where he edged Ivan Rovny and Taylor Phinney in the sprint. At the end of the 2013 season, Gavazzi terminated his contract with Androni Giocattoli–Venezuela. Androni team manager Gianni Savio claimed that the split was due to Gavazzi demanding a guaranteed start for the 2014 Giro d'Italia. Gavazzi signed with the Christina Watches–Dana team for the 2014 season.

On 12 April 2016, it was announced that Gavazzi had been provisionally suspended by the UCI for a cocaine positive taken at the 2015 Tour of Qinghai Lake. It was his third positive test to this substance during his career. He was given a four-year suspension, backdated to July 2015.

== Major results ==
2003
1st Coppa San Biagio
1st Trofeo Antonietto Rancilio
2004
1st Trofeo Gino Visentini
1st Trofeo Papà Cervi
1st Circuito del Porto
1st Alta Padovana Tour
1st Coppa San Biagio
1st Trofeo Lampre
1st Stage 10 Girobio
2006
7th Giro del Mendrisiotto
2007
1st Univest GP
Istrian Spring Trophy

1st Stages 2 & 3

Tour de Normandie

1st Stages 1, 2a & 2b

1st Stage 2 Vuelta a Navarra
10th Coppa Bernocchi
2008
1st Giro di Toscana
1st Stage 2 Settimana Ciclistica Lombarda
1st Stage 5 Circuit de Lorraine
1st Stage 5 Brixia Tour
9th Gran Premio della Costa Etruschi
2009
1st Stage 1 Tour de San Luis
Tour de Langkawi

1st Points classification
1st Stages 1, 2, 3 & 6

1st Stage 3 Settimana Ciclistica Lombarda
Brixia Tour

1st Stages 1a & 5

Vuelta a Venezuela

1st Stages 3a, 3b & 4

2010
1st Stage 2 Settimana Ciclistica Lombarda
4th Gran Premio della Costa Etruschi
2013
1st Giro di Toscana
1st Stage 7 Tour de San Luis
1st Stage 3b Sibiu Cycling Tour
1st Stage 3 Vuelta a Venezuela
2nd Châteauroux Classic
2014
Tour of Qinghai Lake

1st Stages 11 & 13

1st Stage 2 Tour of China I
1st Stage 1 Tour of China II
Tour of Fuzhou

1st Points classification
1st Stage 3

3rd Banja Luka–Belgrade I
2015
~~1st Overall Tour of China II~~

~~1st Points classification~~
~~1st Stages 1, 4 & 5~~

1st Stage 6 Vuelta a Mexico
1st Stage 2 Tour of Estonia
~~Tour of Qinghai Lake~~

~~1st Stages 8, 10, 11 & 13~~

~~Tour of Fuzhou~~

~~1st Points classification~~
~~1st Stages 1 & 3~~

3rd GP Adria Mobil
~~3rd Croatia–Slovenia~~

=== Grand Tour general classification results timeline ===
Grand Tour	2013
Giro d'Italia	DNF
Tour de France	—
Vuelta a España	—

Legend
—	Did not compete
DNF	Did not finish
