= Emanuel Guevara =

Argentine bicycle racer

Personal information
- Full name: Emanuel Domingo Guevara Arguello
- Born: 7 February 1989 (age 37) San Luis, Argentina

Cycling career
- Sport: Cycling
- Current team: Retired
- Discipline: Road
- Role: Rider

Professional teams
- 2012–2016: San Luis Somos Todos
- 2017: Municipalidad de Rawson–Somos Todos

Emanuel Domingo Guevara Arguello (born 7 February 1989 in San Luis, Argentina) is an Argentine former professional cyclist.

== Major results ==
2013
1st Stage 5 Tour de San Luis
