= Ora Hotels–Carrera =

Team information
- UCI code: OHT
- Registered: Hungary
- Founded: 2006
- Discipline: Road
- Status: Continental
- Bicycles: Carrera

Key personnel
- General manager: István Pisók
- Team manager: Germano Pierdoménico

Team name history
Ora Hotels–Carrera jersey
Jersey

Ora Hotels–Carrera (UCI team code: OHT) is a professional road bicycle racing team licensed in Hungary, that compete in the UCI Continental Circuits. Starting from 2011 it has three main sponsors, international hotel chain Ora Hotels, bicycle manufacturer Carrera and fittings producer D SIGN.

== Major wins ==
2007
Beograd–Banja Luka II, Zsolt Der
Stages 5 & 7 Presidential Cycling Tour of Turkey, Zsolt Der
Stage 6 Tour de Serbie, Zsolt Der
Serbia Road Race Championships, Zsolt Der
Prologue GP de Gemenc, Péter Kusztor
GP Betonexpressz 2000, Zsolt Der
Overall Paths of Victory Tour, Zoltan Remak

Stage 4, Zoltan Remak

2008
GP Hydraulika Mikolasek, Péter Kusztor
Overall Tour of Romania, Rida Cador

Stage 1, Davide D'Angelo
Stage 4, Rida Cador

Hungary Road Race Championships, Zoltan Madaras
GP Bradlo, Péter Kusztor
GP Betonexpressz 2000, Péter Kusztor
GP P-Nivo, Gergely Ivanics
Stage 3 Tour of Szeklerland, Daniele Colli
2009
Venezuela Road Race Championships, Honorio Machado
Hungary Road Race Championships, Istvan Cziraki
Latvia Time Trial Championships, Raivis Belohvoščiks
Stage 1 GP Gemenc, Krisztián Lovassy
GP Betonexpressz 2000, Gergely Ivanics
2010
Trophée Princier, Roberto Richeze
Trophée de la Maison Royale, Adriano Angeloni
2011
Stage 5 Vuelta al Uruguay, Alessandro Malaguti
Stage 6b Vuelta al Uruguay, Mauro Richeze
Banja Luka–Beograd I, Krisztián Lovassy
Hungary Road Race Championships, Rida Cador
Stage 6, Tour of Romania, Krisztián Lovassy

== Team roster ==
As of 26 July 2011

Rider	Date of birth
Adriano Angeloni (ITA)	31 January 1983 (age 43)
Bendegúz Bernárd (HUN)	15 February 1988 (age 38)
Simone Boifava (ITA)	26 July 1985 (age 41)
Rida Cador (HUN)	25 March 1981 (age 45)
István Cziráki (HUN)	21 June 1986 (age 40)
Miklós Durucz (HUN)	13 March 1991 (age 35)
Luca Fioretti (ITA)	6 March 1984 (age 42)
Krisztián Lovassy (HUN)	23 June 1988 (age 38)
Alessandro Malaguti (ITA)	22 September 1987 (age 38)

Rider	Date of birth
Walter Proch (ITA)	14 February 1984 (age 42)
Dávid Puskás (HUN)	28 October 1988 (age 37)
Mauro Richeze (ARG)	7 December 1985 (age 40)
Roberto Richeze (ARG)	25 October 1981 (age 44)
Emanuele Rizza (ITA)	8 February 1984 (age 42)
Péter Simon (HUN)	14 October 1991 (age 34)
Ferenc Stubán (HUN)	11 August 1992 (age 34)
Walter Trillini (ARG)	25 January 1991 (age 35)
