= Cador (surname) =

Cador is a surname. Notable people with the surname include:

- Rida Cador (born 1981), Hungarian cyclist
- Roger Cador (born 1952), American baseball player and coach
