= Alfredo Lucero =

Argentine racing cyclist

Personal information
- Full name: Alfredo Osvaldo Lucero Sosa
- Born: February 8, 1979 (age 47) San Luis, Argentina

Cycling career
- Sport: Cycling
- Current team: Suspended
- Discipline: Road
- Role: Rider

Amateur teams
- 2017–2018: Mirasal
- 2019: La Voz de San Justo

Professional teams
- 2013–2016: San Luis Somos Todos
- 2020: Equipo Continental San Luis

Alfredo Osvaldo Lucero Sosa (born February 8, 1979) is an Argentine professional racing cyclist, who is currently suspended from the sport following an anti-doping violation for the use of prohibited substances.

== Major results ==
2008
1st Stage 6 Vuelta a San Juan
2009
1st Overall Tour de San Luis
2013
1st Stage 3 (TTT) Vuelta a Bolivia
