= Rida Cador =

Hungarian cyclist

Personal information
- Born: 25 March 1981 (age 45) Tata, Hungary

Cycling career
- Sport: Cycling
- Current team: Retired
- Discipline: Road
- Role: Rider

Professional teams
- 2006–2008: P-Nívó Betonexpressz 2000 Corratec
- 2009: Atlas–Romer's Hausbäckerei
- 2010–2011: Betonexpressz 2000–Universal Caffé
- 2013: Utensilnord Ora24.eu

Rida Cador (born 25 March 1981 in Tata) is a Hungarian former cyclist.

== Major results ==
2007
1st Stage 2 Tour of Szeklerland
5th Overall Tour de Hongrie
8th Overall Paths of Victory Tour
2008
1st Overall Tour of Romania

1st Stage 4

4th Road race, National Road Championships
4th GP Betonexpressz 2000
7th Overall Tour of Szeklerland
8th GP Palma
2009
National Road Championships

1st Time trial
2nd Road race

2010
5th Road race, National Road Championships
7th Overall The Paths of King Nikola
2011
1st Road race, National Road Championships
8th Overall Cycling Tour of Sibiu
2013
1st Overall Grand Prix Cycliste de Gemenc

1st Stages 2 & 3
