= Enzo Moyano =

Argentinian bicycle racer

Personal information
- Full name: Enzo Josué Moyano
- Born: February 15, 1989 (age 37) San Luis, Argentina

Cycling career
- Sport: Cycling
- Current team: Rower San Luis Continental
- Discipline: Road
- Role: Rider (retired); Directeur sportif

Professional teams
- 2012–2013: Caja Rural
- 2014–2016: San Luis Somos Todos
- 2017–2019: Equipo Continental Municipalidad de Pocito

Managerial team
- 2020–: Equipo Continental San Luis

Enzo Josué Moyano (born February 15, 1989, in San Luis, Argentina) is an Argentine former professional cyclist, who rode professionally between 2012 and 2019 for the Caja Rural–Seguros RGA, San Luis Somos Todos and Equipo Continental Municipalidad de Pocito teams. He now works as a directeur sportif for UCI Continental team Rower San Luis Continental.

== Major results ==
2011
1st Stage 5 Vuelta a Navarra
3rd Tour de San Luis
3rd Vuelta Ciclista a León
2014
5th Tour de San Luis
2017
1st Stage 4 Vuelta del Uruguay
