= Alex Diniz =

Brazilian racing cyclist

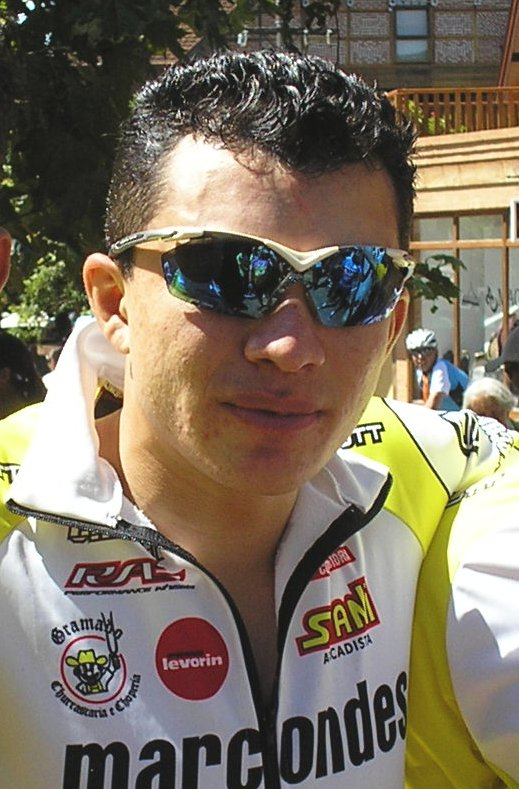

Personal information
- Full name: Alex Correia Diniz
- Nickname: Meio-Quilo
- Born: 20 October 1985 (age 40) Recife, Brazil
- Height: 1.70 m (5 ft 7 in)
- Weight: 58 kg (128 lb)

Cycling career
- Sport: Cycling
- Discipline: Road
- Role: Rider
- Rider type: Climber

Amateur teams
- 2006: Nossa Caixa-Sundown-São Caetano
- 2009: Team Vale/Fapi/O Lojão/Gramado/JKS/SEJELP
- 2009: Sejelp/Fapi/Sundown/JKS de Pindamonhangaba
- 2011: Padaria Real/Calói/Céu Azul Alimentos
- 2025: Pindamonhangaba Cycling Team

Professional teams
- 2007–2008: Scott–Marcondes Cesar–São José dos Campos
- 2012: Real Cycling Team
- 2013–2016: Funvic Brasilinvest–São José dos Campos

Major wins
- 1st overall and U23 – Tour de Santa Catarina (2007) (BRA); 1st overall – Volta de São Paulo (2006) (BRA)
Medal record
Men's road bicycle racing
Representing Brazil
Pan American Championships
Bronze medal – third place	2006 São Paulo	Road race

Alex Correia Diniz (born 20 October 1985) is a Brazilian professional racing cyclist. He was born in Recife, and his specialties are climbing and endurance races.

He served a two-year drugs ban between 2009 and 2011, after testing positive for erythropoietin (EPO) and his 2009 results were cancelled. In 2013, racing for Funvic Brasilinvest–São José dos Campos, Diniz won the queen stage of the Tour de San Luis. He soloed to victory after attacking at the foot of the final climb, the Mirador del Potrero, taking the leader's jersey in the process.

In 2017, Diniz was given an eight-year ban for anomalies in his biological passport.

== Major results ==
2005
3rd Road race, National Under-23 Road Championships
2006
1st Overall Volta de São Paulo

1st Stage 7

3rd Road race, Pan American Cycling Championships
5th Overall Volta do Paraná
2007
1st Overall Tour de Santa Catarina

1st Stages 1 (TTT), 2 & 7

6th Overall Volta do Paraná
8th Overall Tour do Rio
2008
1st Stage 3 Volta do Paraná
2009
~~1st Overall Tour de Santa Catarina~~

~~1st Stage 4~~

2012
2nd Overall Tour do Rio

1st Mountains classification

8th Overall Rutas de América
8th Overall Tour do Brasil

1st Stage 7

2013
2nd Road race, National Road Championships
3rd Overall Tour de San Luis

1st Stage 3

2014
2nd Overall Tour do Brasil

1st Points classification

8th Overall Tour of Utah
10th Overall Tour do Rio
2015
3rd Overall Tour do Rio
2016
~~7th Overall Tour of Hainan~~
