= Catriel Soto =

Argentine cyclist (born 1987)

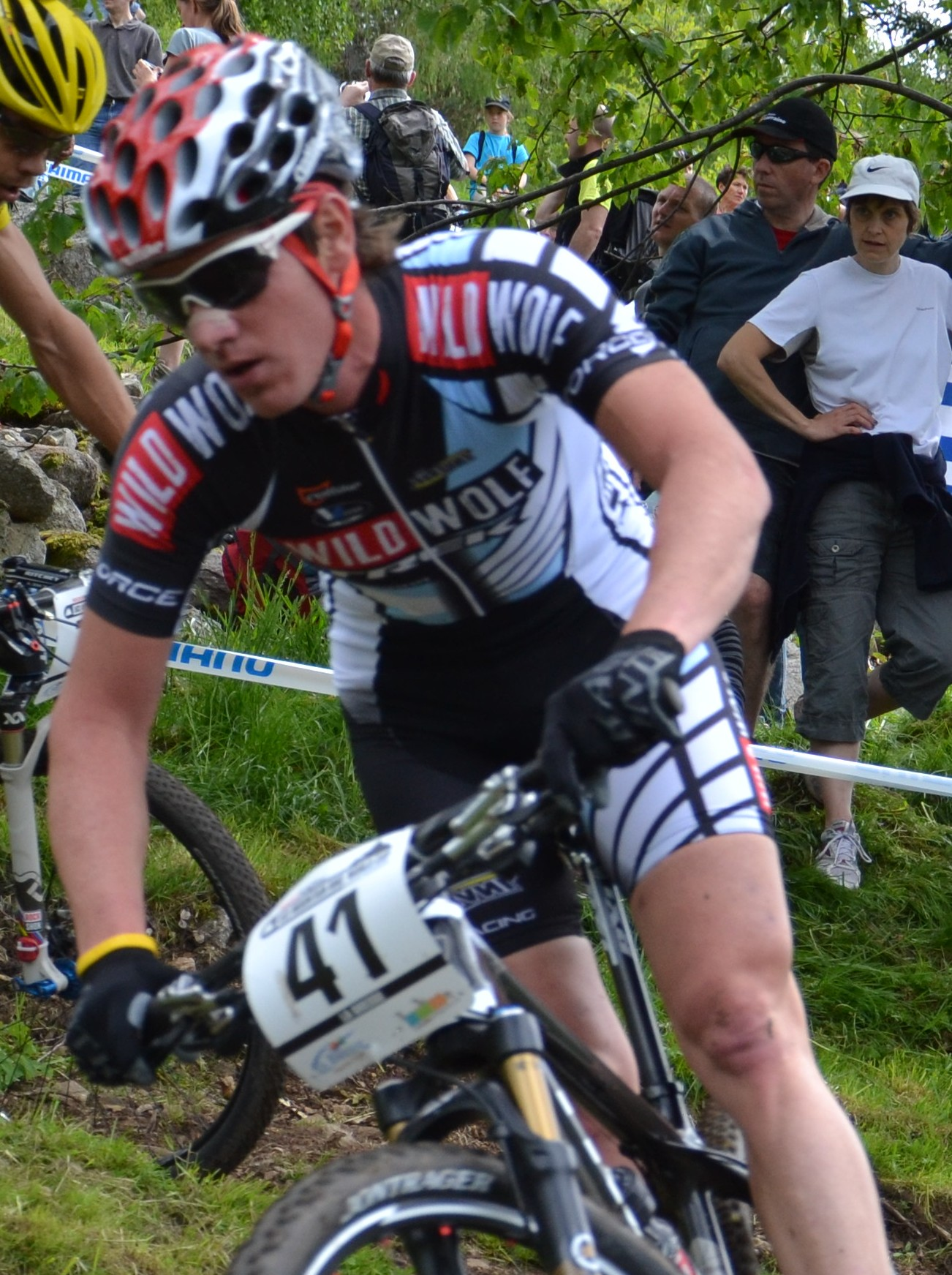
- Soto in 2012

Personal information
- Full name: Catriel Andrés Soto Auer
- Born: 29 March 1987 (age 39) Colón, Argentina

Cycling career
- Sport: Cycling
- Disciplines: Mountain biking; Road
- Role: Rider

Professional team
- 2020: Equipo Continental San Luis
Medal record
Men's mountain bike cycling
Representing Argentina
World Championships
Bronze medal – third place	2013 Pietermaritzburg	Cross-country eliminator
Pan American Games
Silver medal – second place	2015 Toronto	Cross-country

Catriel Andrés Soto Auer (born 29 April 1987) is an Argentine cross-country mountain biker and road racing cyclist, who most recently rode for UCI Continental team Equipo Continental San Luis.

== Career ==
Born in Colón, Soto competed at the 2012 Summer Olympics, in the Men's cross-country at Hadleigh Farm, finishing in 26th place. In 2015, Soto won the silver medal at the Pan American Games. He also participated at the 2011 Pan American Games, 2016 Summer Olympics and 2019 Pan American Games.
