= 2009 Tour de San Luis =

Race details
- Dates: January 22 – January 27
- Stages: 7
- Distance: 1,014 km (630.1 mi)
- Winning time: 24h 37' 52"

Results
	Winner	Alfredo Lucero (ARG)
	Second	Jorge Giacinti (ARG)
	Third	José Serpa (COL)

The 2009 Tour de San Luis was a men's road cycling race held from 19 to January 25, 2009, in Argentina. The third edition of this road racing event was a multiple stage race with seven stages and a total length of 1014 kilometres.

== Stage summary ==
Stage	Date	Start	Finish	Distance	Stage Top 3
1	19 January	San Luis	Villa Mercedes	168.4 km	Mattia Gavazzi (ITA); Juan José Haedo (ARG); Lucas Haedo (ARG)
2	20 January	La Toma	Mirador El Potrero	174.4 km	Lucas Haedo (ARG); Magno Nazaret (BRA); Alfredo Lucero (ARG)
3	21 January	San Luis	San Luis	19.8 km	Jorge Giacinti (ARG); Tom Zirbel (USA); Martín Garrido (ARG)
4	22 January	San Luis	La Carolina	159 km	José Serpa (COL); Matti Breschel (DEN); Mattia Gavazzi (ITA)
5	23 January	San Francisco	Villa de Merlo	204.8 km	Xavier Tondó (ESP); Jorge Giacinti (ARG); José Serpa (COL)
6	24 January	Potrero de los Funes	Potrero de los Funes	121 km	Luis Alberto Romero (CUB); Matti Breschel (DEN); Manuel Belletti (ITA)
7	24 January	San Luis	San Luis	167.1 km	Juan José Haedo (ARG); Mattia Gavazzi (ITA); Oscar Gatto (ITA)

=== General Classification ===
Pos	Rider	Time
1	Alfredo Lucero (ARG)	24:37.52
2	Jorge Giacinti (ARG)	+ 1.05
3	José Serpa (COL)	+ 1.31
4	Andriy Hryvko (UKR)	+ 2.22
5	Ivan Basso (ITA)	+ 2.24
6	Luis Alberto Romero (CUB)	+ 2.25
7	Carlos José Ochoa (VEN)	+ 2.59
	Benjamin Jacques-Maynes (USA)	+ 2.59
9	Ignacio Pereyra (ARG)	+ 3.19
10	Jackson Rodríguez (VEN)	+ 3.34
