= Walter Proch =

Italian cyclist

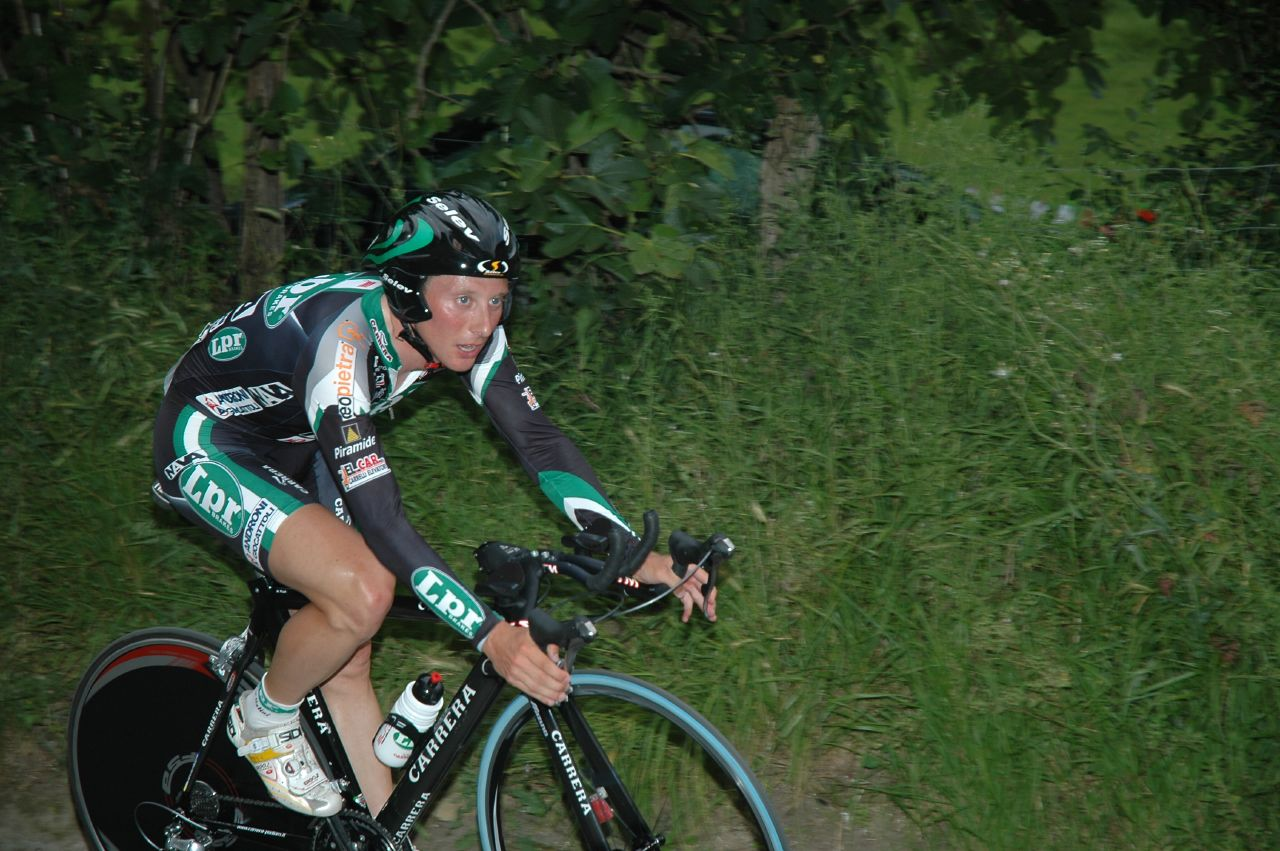

Personal information
- Born: 17 February 1984 (age 42) Rovereto, Italy

Cycling career
- Sport: Cycling
- Current team: Retired
- Discipline: Road
- Role: Rider

Professional teams
- 2007–2008: Team LPR
- 2009–2011: Betonexpressz 2000–Limonta
- 2012: Team WIT

Walter Proch (born 17 February 1984 in Rovereto) is an Italian former cyclist.

== Major results ==
2005
3rd Giro del Canavese
9th Gran Premio della Liberazione
2006
4th Tour du Jura
4th Coppa Città di Asti
8th Trofeo Città di Brescia
2008
1st Stage 3 Tour Ivoirien de la Paix
9th Overall Regio-Tour
2009
6th Memorial Marco Pantani
