= Panamericano Municipality =

Municipality in Táchira, Venezuela

Panamericano Municipality Municipio Panamericano
- Municipality
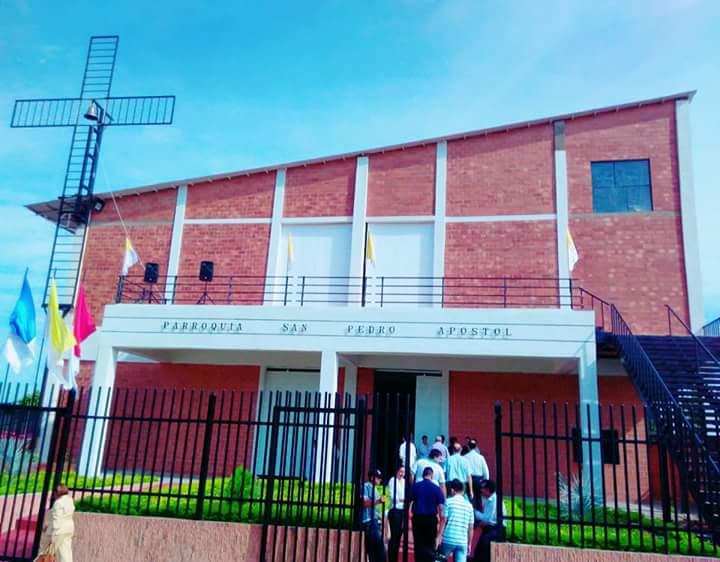

- Flag Seal

- Location in Táchira

- Location in Venezuela
- Country: Venezuela
- State: Táchira
- Municipal seat: Coloncito

Government
  - Mayor: Rigo Rangel Hernández (Copei)

Area
  - Total: 744.5 km^{2} (287.5 sq mi)

Population (2011)
  - Total: 32,180
  - Density: 43.22/km^{2} (111.9/sq mi)
- Time zone: UTC−4 (VET)

Panamericano Municipality is one of the 29 municipalities in Táchira state, Venezuela. The municipality has a total surface of 776 km^{2} and it has some 32,180 inhabitants (2011 census). Its capital is Coloncito.
