= Gergely Ivanics =

Hungarian cyclist

Personal information
- Born: 8 April 1978 (age 48) Pécs, Hungary

Cycling career
- Sport: Cycling
- Current team: Retired
- Discipline: Road
- Role: Rider

Professional teams
- 2007: Team Cornix
- 2008–2009: P-Nívó Betonexpressz 2000 Corratec

Gergely Ivanics (born 8 April 1978) is a Hungarian former road cyclist.

== Major results ==
2006
2nd Road race, National Road Championships
6th Overall Grand Prix Cycliste de Gemenc
2007
3rd Banja Luka–Belgrade I
4th Overall Grand Prix Cycliste de Gemenc
6th GP Betonexpressz 2000
2008
1st Grand Prix P-Nívó
2nd Overall Tour of Szeklerland
3rd Road race, National Road Championships
4th Trofeo Città di Brescia
5th Banja Luka–Belgrade I
10th Tour of Vojvodina I
10th Banja Luka–Belgrade II
2009
1st GP Betonexpressz 2000
3rd Time trial, National Road Championships
5th Overall Romanian Cycling Tour
6th Banja Luka–Belgrade
10th GP Kooperativa
2010
1st Overall Grand Prix Cycliste de Gemenc

1st Stages 1, 2 & 3

2nd GP Betonexpressz 2000
2011
8th GP Betonexpressz 2000
