= El Durazno, Argentina =

Coordinates: 27°15′14″S 67°02′17″W

El Durazno
- Municipality and village
- Interactive map of El Durazno
- Country: Argentina
- Province: Catamarca Province
- Time zone: UTC−3 (ART)

El Durazno is a village and municipality in Catamarca Province in northwestern Argentina.
