= Tour de San Luis =

Argentine multi-day road cycling race

Race details
- Date: January
- Region: San Luis, Argentina
- English name: Tour of San Luis
- Discipline: Road
- Competition: UCI America Tour; 2.1 (2009–2016); 2.2 (2007–2008)
- Type: Stage race
- Web site: www.toursanluis.com

History
- First edition: 2007
- Editions: 9
- Final edition: 2016
- First winner: Jorge Giacinti (ARG)
- Most wins: Daniel Díaz (ARG) 2 wins
- Final winner: Dayer Quintana (COL)

The Tour de San Luis was a road cycling race that was held in San Luis Province, Argentina from 2007 to 2016. The race consisted of a competition over an individual time trial, and six stages. The competition carried a UCI rating of 2.1, and is part of the UCI America Tour, which is one of five UCI Continental Circuits sponsored by the Union Cycliste Internationale, the sport's international governing body.

== Past winners ==
Year	Country	Rider	Team
2007	Argentina	Jorge Giacinti	Lider Presto Chile
2008	Argentina	Martín Garrido	Palmeiras Resort–Tavira
2009	Argentina	Alfredo Lucero	Argentina National Team
2010	Italy	Vincenzo Nibali	Liquigas–Doimo
2011	Chile	Marco Arriagada	Chile National Team
2012	United States	Levi Leipheimer	Omega Pharma–Quick-Step
2013	Argentina	Daniel Díaz	San Luis Somos Todos
2014	Colombia	Nairo Quintana	Movistar Team
2015	Argentina	Daniel Díaz	UniFunvic–Pindamonhangaba
2016	Colombia	Dayer Quintana	Movistar Team
