= Fraga, San Luis =

Coordinates: 33°30′S 65°48′W

Fraga (San Luis)
- Municipality and village
- Interactive map of Fraga (San Luis)
- Country: Argentina
- Province: San Luis Province
- Time zone: UTC−3 (ART)

Fraga (San Luis) is a village and municipality in San Luis Province in central Argentina.
