= Lucas Gaday =

Argentine cyclist

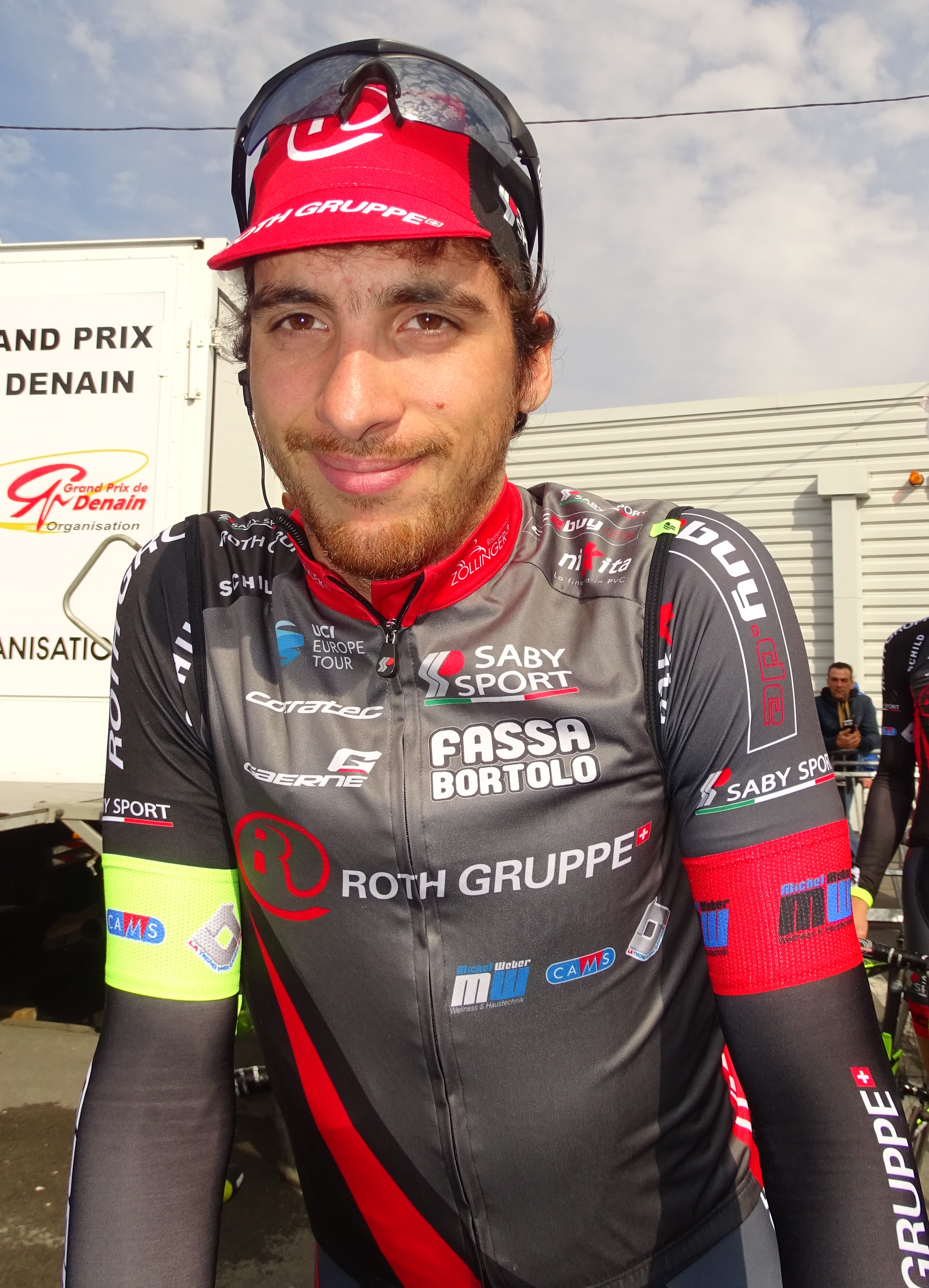
- Gaday at the 2016 Grand Prix de Denain

Personal information
- Full name: Lucas Manuel Gaday Orozco
- Born: 20 February 1993 (age 33) Buenos Aires, Argentina

Cycling career
- Sport: Cycling
- Current team: Rower San Luis Continental
- Discipline: Road
- Role: Rider

Amateur teams
- 2018: CC Alas Rojas
- 2019–2020: CC Ciudad del Plata
- 2021: Team Bicicl. Jacamo-Mendoza

Professional teams
- 2013–2014: Buenos Aires Provincia
- 2015: Unieuro–Wilier
- 2016: Team Roth
- 2017: Los Cascos Esco–AgroPlan
- 2022–: Equipo Continental San Luis

Lucas Manuel Gaday Orozco (born 20 February 1993) is an Argentine racing cyclist, who currently rides for UCI Continental team Rower San Luis Continental. He rode at the 2014 UCI Road World Championships.

== Major results ==
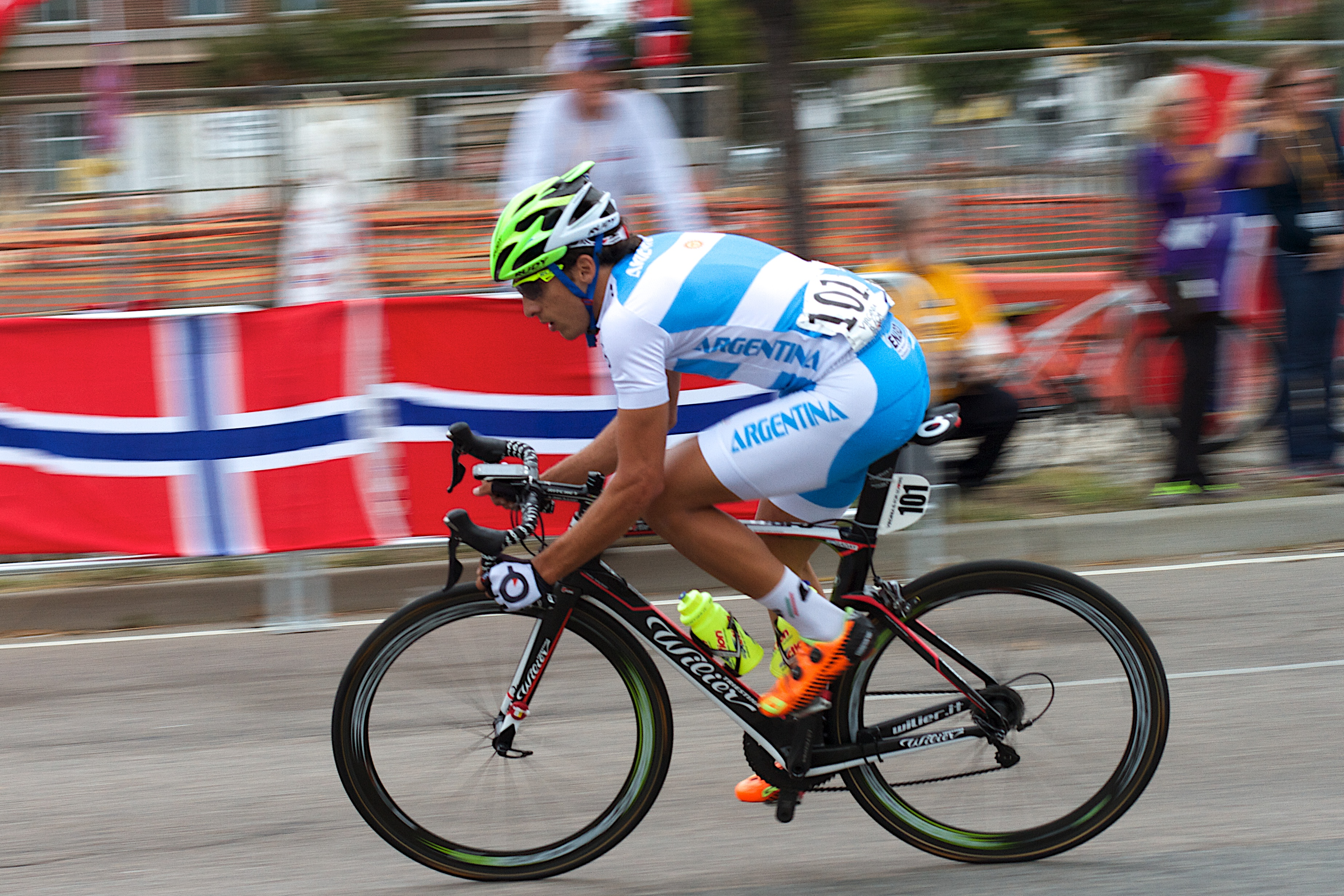
Gaday at the 2015 UCI Road World Championships

2013
7th Road race, Pan American Under-23 Road Championships
2014
2nd Road race, National Under-23 Road Championships
2015
1st Gran Premio della Liberazione
3rd Road race, Pan American Under-23 Road Championships
8th Road race, UCI Under-23 Road World Championships
10th La Côte Picarde
2018
3rd Road race, National Road Championships
2022
2nd Road race, National Road Championships
8th Overall Vuelta a Formosa Internacional

1st Stage 1
