= Renca, San Luis =

Coordinates: 32°46′S 65°22′W

Renca
- Municipality and village
- Interactive map of Renca
- Country: Argentina
- Province: San Luis Province
- Time zone: UTC−3 (ART)

Renca is a village and municipality in San Luis Province in central Argentina.
