= Coloncito, Táchira =

City in Táchira State, Venezuela

Coloncito
- City
- Coat of arms

- Location within Venezuela
- Coordinates: 8°20′N 72°05′W
- Country: Venezuela
- State: Táchira State
- Municipality: Panamericano Municipality
- Time zone: UTC−4 (VET)

Coloncito is the capital city of Panamericano Municipality, in Táchira State, Venezuela. The municipality also contains the small town of La Palmita.
