= Daniel Díaz (cyclist) =

Argentine road bicycle racer

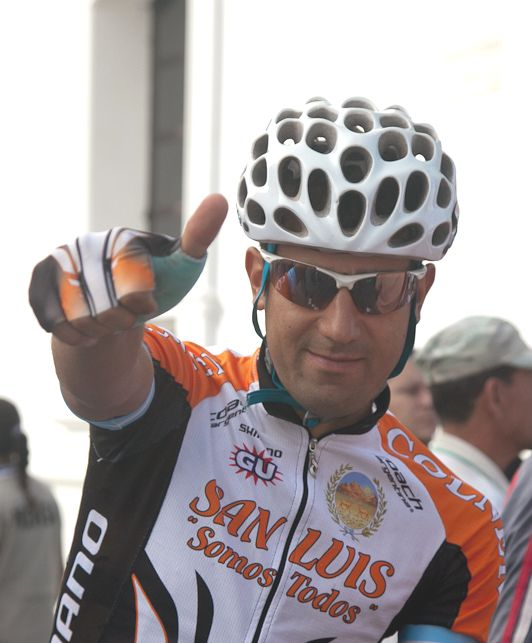
- Díaz in 2013

Personal information
- Full name: Daniel Ricardo Díaz
- Born: 7 July 1989 (age 37) Salta, Argentina

Cycling career
- Sport: Cycling
- Current team: Transportes Puertas de Cuyo
- Discipline: Road
- Role: Rider
- Rider type: Climber

Amateur teams
- 2009–2010: Glas Casa Real–Campos de Solana
- 2010: Footon–Servetto–Fuji (stagiaire)

Professional teams
- 2011: La Pomme Marseille
- 2012–2014: San Luis Somos Todos
- 2015: Carrefour Funvic Soul Cycling Team
- 2016–2017: Delko–Marseille Provence KTM
- 2018: Sindicato de Empleados Publicos de San Juan
- 2019: Equipo Continental Municipalidad de Pocito
- 2020–: Transportes Puertas de Cuyo

Major wins
- One-day races and Classics National Road Race Championships (2014)

Daniel Ricardo Díaz (born 7 July 1989) is an Argentine road bicycle racer, who currently rides for UCI Continental team Transportes Puertas de Cuyo.

== Career ==
=== San Luis Somos Todos (2012–2014) ===
In 2012, he came in second place of the general classification of the Tour de San Luis. He was originally third, but Alberto Contador's results were later voided, which also awarded him the fifth stage of that race since he had finished second behind Contador.

In January 2013, Díaz won the overall classification of the Tour de San Luis, besting second-placed Tejay van Garderen (BMC Racing Team) by 33 seconds. He earned the leader's jersey after the mountainous stage 5, where he finished second behind his teammate Emmanuel Guevara. He managed to hold on to his lead until the end of the seven-stage race, scoring another second place on the sixth stage finishing atop the Mirador del Sol, 2 seconds behind Alberto Contador (Saxo–Tinkoff), who placed a strong attack in the closing kilometer.

== Major results ==
2009
Vuelta al Ecuador

1st Stages 6 & 7

10th Prova Ciclística 9 de Julho
2010
3rd Overall Vuelta a Navarra

1st Stages 2 & 3

2011
4th Paris–Troyes
4th Paris–Mantes-en-Yvelines
2012
2nd Overall Tour de San Luis

1st Stage 5

9th Overall Vuelta a Bolivia

1st Stage 9a

2013
1st Overall Tour de San Luis
9th Overall Vuelta a Bolivia

1st Stage 3 (TTT)

2014
National Road Championships

1st Road race
2nd Time trial

2015
1st Overall Tour de San Luis

1st Stages 2 & 4

2016
10th Road race, Pan American Road Championships
