= Adrián Richeze =

Argentine cyclist

Personal information
- Full name: Adrián Ezequiel Richeze Araquistain
- Born: 29 April 1989 (age 37) Buenos Aires, Argentina

Cycling career
- Sport: Cycling
- Current team: Transportes Puertas de Cuyo
- Discipline: Road
- Role: Rider

Amateur teams
- 2008–2009: Filmop Sorelle Ramonda Bottoli
- 2010: Reale Mutua–ORT
- 2011: Viris Vigevano–Lomellina
- 2014: Sprint Haupt
- 2015–2016: A.C. Agrupación Virgen de Fátima

Professional teams
- 2013: Team Nippo–De Rosa
- 2017–2019: A.C. Agrupación Virgen de Fátima
- 2020–: Transportes Puertas de Cuyo

Adrián Ezequiel Richeze Araquistain (born 29 April 1989) is an Argentine cyclist, who currently rides for UCI Continental team Transportes Puertas de Cuyo. His brothers Roberto, Maximiliano and Mauro are also cyclists.

== Major results ==
2014
2nd Team pursuit, South American Games
2015
2nd Team pursuit, Pan American Games
2016
2nd Road race, National Road Championships
2018
9th Overall Vuelta Ciclista del Uruguay

1st Stage 1

2019
1st Stage 7 Vuelta Ciclista del Uruguay
