= Roberto Richeze =

Argentine cyclist

Personal information
- Full name: Roberto Antonio Richeze Araquistain
- Born: 25 October 1981 (age 44)

Cycling career
- Sport: Cycling
- Current team: Retired
- Discipline: Road
- Role: Rider

Professional teams
- 2007: Team Universal Caffè-Ecopetrol
- 2008: Katay Cycling Team
- 2009–2011: Betonexpressz 2000–Limonta

Roberto Antonio Richeze Araquistain (born 25 October 1981) is an Argentinian cyclist. His brothers Mauro, Maximiliano and Adrián are also cyclists.

== Major results ==
2010
1st Trophée Princier
2013
2nd Overall Vuelta a San Juan
2014
3rd Overall Vuelta a San Juan
