= Carolina, San Luis =

Carolina (San Luis)
- Municipality and village
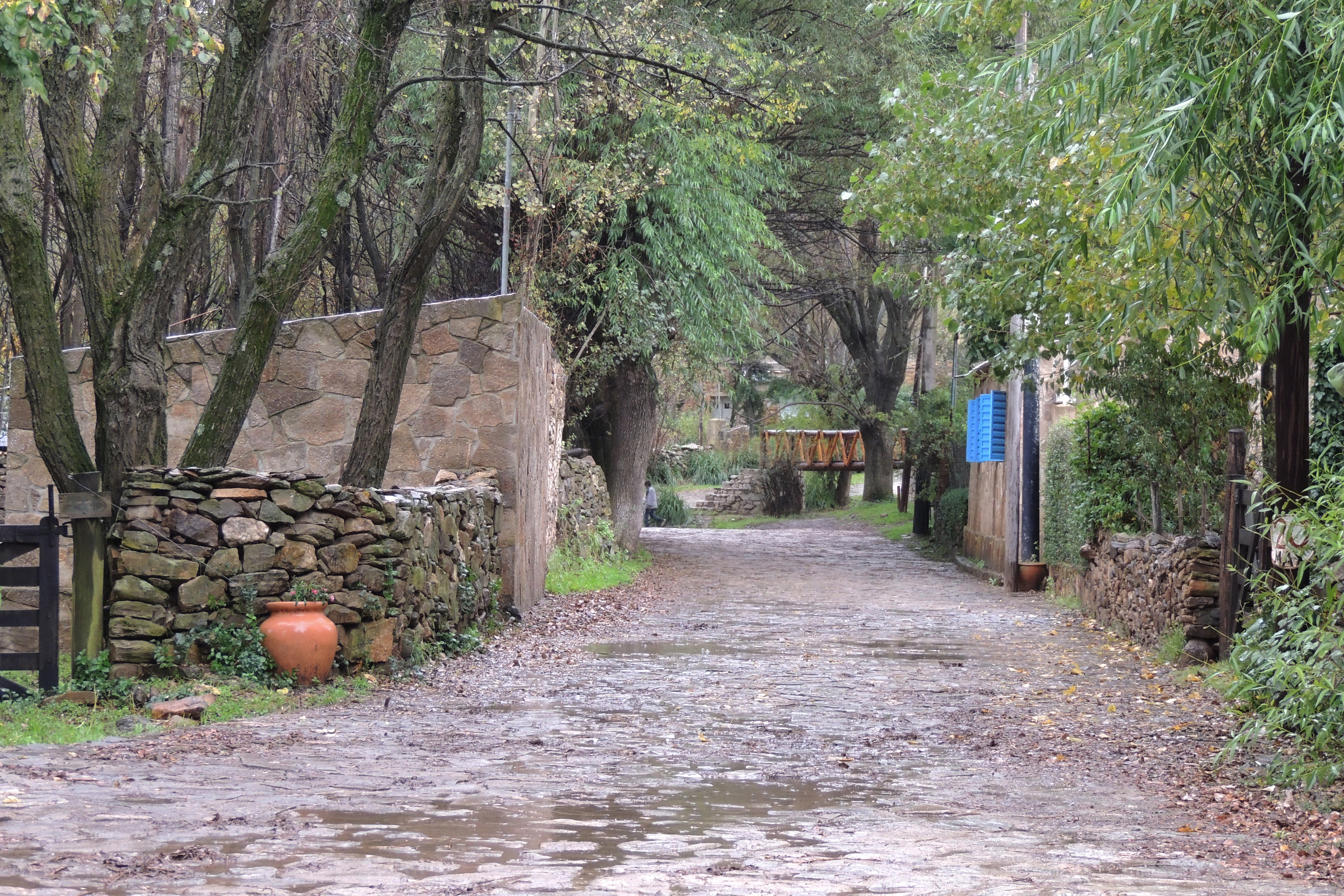

- Map of San Luis Province
- Coordinates: 32°48′43″S 66°5′38″W
- Country: Argentina
- Province: San Luis Province
- Time zone: UTC−3 (ART)

Carolina (San Luis) is a village and municipality in San Luis Province in central Argentina. It is near the Río Trapiche.

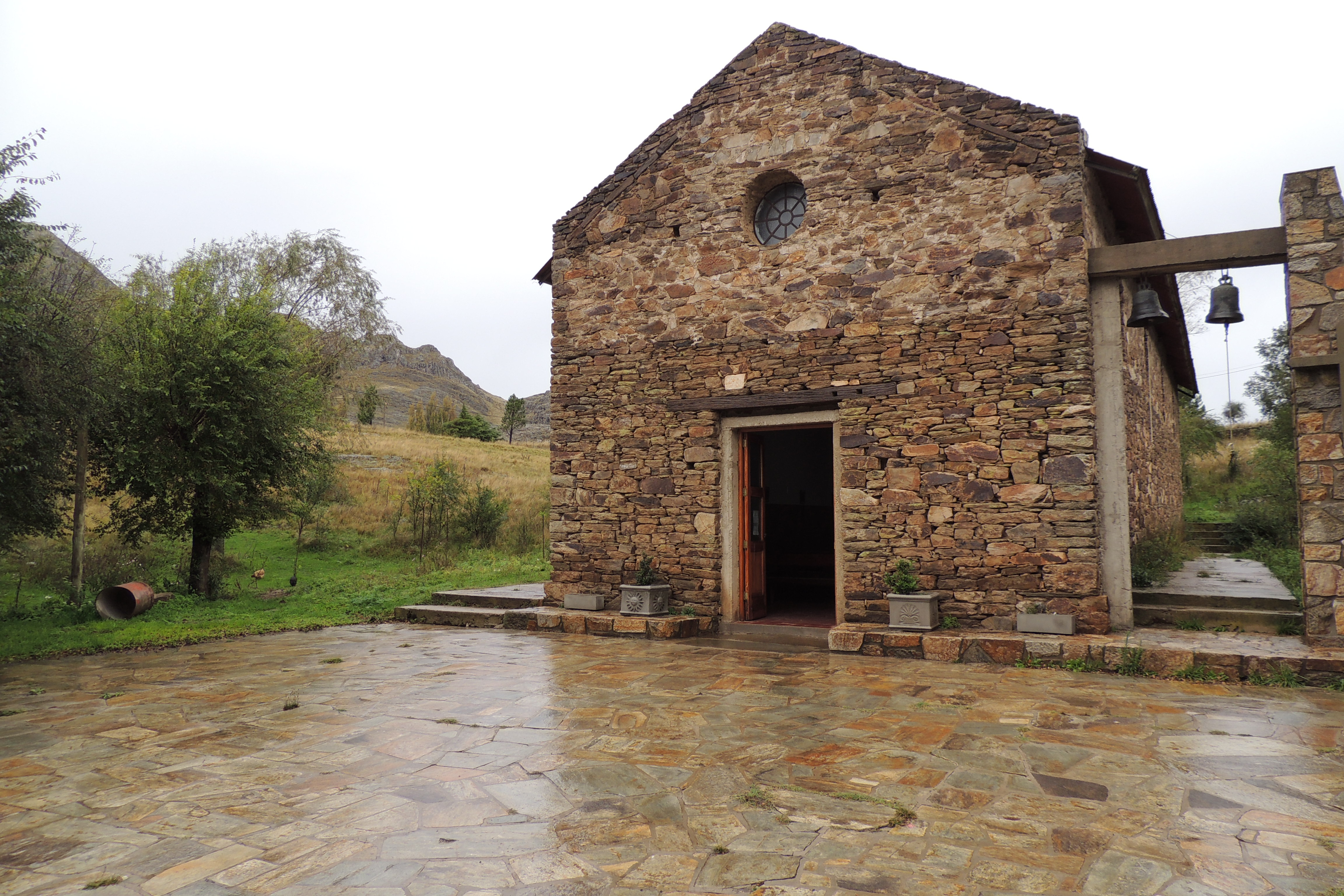
Iglesia de La Carolina

== Climate ==
During July when the weather is usually the coldest, common temperatures range from 5-18°C. In January when it is hottest the temperature average highs and low ranges from 31°C and drops to 19°C.
