= Los Cascos Esco–AgroPlan =

Team information
- UCI code: CEA
- Registered: Argentina
- Founded: 2013
- Disbanded: 2017
- Discipline: Road
- Status: UCI Continental

Team name history
- 2013–2015 2016 2017: Buenos Aires Provincia; Los Matanceros; Los Cascos Esco–AgroPlan

Los Cascos Esco–AgroPlan is an Argentinian UCI Continental cycling team established in 2013.

The team disbanded at the end of the 2017 season.

== Team roster ==
Rider	Date of birth
Juan Manuel Aguirre (ARG)	2 November 1975 (age 50)
Nicolás Gabreil Antorena (ARG)	12 May 1996 (age 30)
Omar Salis Azzem (ARG)	22 August 1992 (age 34)
Juan Martín Boldú (ARG)	9 August 1995 (age 31)
Santiago Alejandro Espindola (ARG)	5 May 1994 (age 32)

Rider	Date of birth
Lucas Gaday Orozco (ARG)	19 February 1993 (age 33)
Julian Paulo Gaday Orozco (ARG)	20 June 1990 (age 36)
César Sigura (ARG)	16 November 1981 (age 44)
Mario Sosa (ARG)	22 June 1995 (age 31)

== Major wins ==
2014
Stage 2 Vuelta Ciclista a Costa Rica, Sebastián Tolosa
