= Tilisarao =

Coordinates: 32°44′S 65°18′W

- Municipality and village
- Interactive map of Tilisarao
- Country: Argentina
- Province: San Luis Province
- Time zone: UTC−3 (ART)

Tilisarao is a village and municipality in San Luis Province in central Argentina.
