= GP Betonexpressz 2000 =

Race details
- Date: Early-August
- Region: Jász-Nagykun-Szolnok County, Hungary
- Discipline: Road
- Competition: UCI Europe Tour
- Type: Single-day

History
- First edition: 2007
- Editions: 5 (as of 2011)
- First winner: Žolt Dér (SRB)
- Most recent: Martin Schöffmann (AUT)

The GP Betonexpressz 2000 is a European bicycle race held in the Jász-Nagykun-Szolnok County, Hungary. Since 2009, the race has been organised as a 1.2 event on the UCI Europe Tour.

== Winners ==
Year	Country	Rider	Team
2007	Serbia	Žolt Dér	P-Nívó Betonexpressz 2000 KFT.SE
2008	Hungary	Péter Kusztor	P-Nívó Betonexpressz 2000 Corratec
2009	Hungary	Gergely Ivanics	Hungary (national team)
2010	Croatia	Hrvoje Miholjević	Croatia (national team)
2011	Austria	Martin Schöffmann	WSA–Viperbike Kärnten
