= La Toma, San Luis =

Coordinates: 33°03′S 65°37′W

La Toma (Argentina)
- Municipality and village
- Interactive map of La Toma (Argentina)
- Country: Argentina
- Province: San Luis Province
- Time zone: UTC−3 (ART)

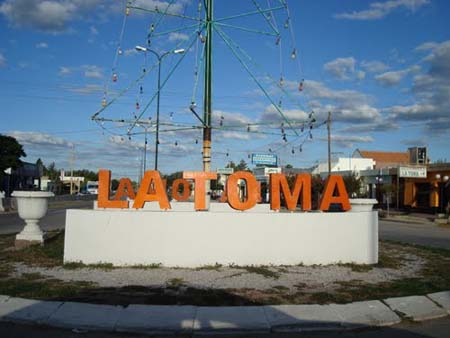
La Toma, San Luis

La Toma (Argentina) is a village and municipality in San Luis Province in central Argentina.
