= Rower San Luis Continental =

Argentine cycling team

Team information
- UCI code: RSL
- Registered: Argentina
- Founded: 2020
- Discipline: Road
- Status: UCI Continental

Key personnel
- Team managers: Enzo Moyano; Ezequiel Moyano

Team name history
- 2020–2022 2023–: Equipo Continental San Luis; Rower San Luis Continental

Rower San Luis Continental is an Argentine UCI Continental cycling team founded in 2020.

== Team roster ==
As of 7 February 2021.

Rider	Date of birth
Juan Ignacio Curuchet (ARG)	4 July 1993 (age 33)
Adrián Díaz (ARG)	14 June 1998 (age 28)
Hernán Fernández (ARG)	16 January 2000 (age 26)
Giuliano Mini (ARG)	6 April 1995 (age 31)
Joel Morales (ARG)	11 April 2001 (age 25)
Maximiliano Navarrete (ARG)	14 May 1991 (age 35)

Rider	Date of birth
Mauro Richeze (ARG)	7 December 1985 (age 40)
Facundo Sagüez (ARG)	5 May 2001 (age 25)
Tomás Suárez (ARG)	19 June 1999 (age 27)
Nicolás Vázquez (ARG)	26 January 2001 (age 25)
Federico Vivas (ARG)	21 May 1996 (age 30)

== Major wins ==
2022
Stage 1 Vuelta a Formosa Internacional, Lucas Gaday
