= Mauro Richeze =

Argentinian cyclist

Personal information
- Full name: Mauro Abel Richeze Araquistain
- Born: 7 December 1985 (age 40) Bella Vista, Buenos Aires, Argentina

Cycling career
- Sport: Cycling
- Current team: Chimbas Te Quiero
- Discipline: Road
- Role: Rider

Professional teams
- 2008–2009: CSF Group–Navigare
- 2011: Ora Hotels–Carrera
- 2012–2013: Team Nippo
- 2015–2016: San Luis Somos Todos
- 2017–2019: A.C. Agrupación Virgen de Fátima
- 2020: Transportes Puertas de Cuyo
- 2021: Equipo Continental San Luis
- 2022–: Chimbas Te Quiero

Major wins
- One-day races and Classics National Road Race Championships (2016)
Medal record
Men's road bicycle racing
Representing Argentina
Pan American Championships
Silver medal – second place	2012 Mar del Plata	Road race

Mauro Abel Richeze Araquistain (born 7 December 1985) is an Argentinian professional racing cyclist, who currently rides for UCI Continental team Chimbas Te Quiero. His brothers Roberto, Maximiliano and Adrián are also cyclists.

== Major results ==
2007
1st Points classification Tour de San Luis
9th Coppa Colli Briantei Internazionale
9th Coppa Città di Asti
2008
1st Stage 9 Tour de Langkawi
2nd Memorial Viviana Manservisi
2011
1st Stage 6 Vuelta Ciclista al Uruguay
4th GP Nobili Rubinetterie
2012
1st Stage 1 Tour de Korea
1st Stage 3 Tour de Kumano
2013
Mzansi Tour

1st Stages 3 & 4

1st Stage 2 Flèche du Sud
Tour de Serbie

1st Stages 2 & 5

2015
Vuelta a Costa Rica

1st Stages 6 & 7

4th Road race, Pan American Games
2016
1st Road race, National Road Championships
1st Stage 8 Vuelta Independencia Nacional
2017
Vuelta Ciclista de Chile

1st Points classification
1st Stages 2a & 3

1st Stage 3a Vuelta Ciclista al Uruguay
