= San Luis Somos Todos =

Cycling team

Team information
- UCI code: SLS
- Registered: Argentina
- Founded: 2012
- Disbanded: 2016
- Discipline: Road
- Status: Continental

Team name history
- 2012–2016: San Luis Somos Todos

San Luis Somos Todos (UCI team code: SLS) is a continental cycling team based in Argentina that participates in UCI Continental Circuits races. The team was founded in 2012.

The disbanded at the end of the 2016 season.

== Roster ==
As of 08 March 2016.

Rider	Date of birth
Cristian Bertola (ARG)	8 July 1997 (age 29)
Sergio Godoy (ARG)	7 July 1988 (age 38)
Emanuel Guevara (ARG)	7 February 1989 (age 37)
Alfredo Lucero (ARG)	8 February 1979 (age 47)
Andres Mini (ARG)	6 April 1995 (age 31)
Enzo Moyano (ARG)	15 February 1989 (age 37)

Rider	Date of birth
Fernando Murgo (ARG)	17 February 1987 (age 39)
Mauricio Quiroga (ARG)	13 March 1992 (age 34)
Mauro Richeze (ARG)	7 December 1985 (age 40)
Leonardo Sosa (ARG)	29 May 1992 (age 34)
Fernando Torres (ARG)	21 May 1994 (age 32)

== Major wins ==
2012
Stage 2 Vuelta a Bolivia, Leandro Messineo
Stage 9a Vuelta a Bolivia, Daniel Díaz
2013
Argentina Time Trial Championships, Leandro Messineo
Overall Tour de San Luis, Daniel Díaz

Stage 5, Emanuel Guevara

Stage 3 Vuelta a Bolivia, TTT
Stage 4 Vuelta a Bolivia, Jorge Giacinti
2014
Argentina Road Race Championships, Daniel Díaz
2015
Argentina Road Race Championships, Daniel Juarez
Stages 6 & 7 Vuelta a Costa Rica, Mauro Richeze
2016
Stage 8 Vuelta a la Independencia Nacional, Mauro Richeze
