= Emmanuel Guevara =

Mexican footballer (born 1902)

Personal information
- Date of birth: 2 February 1902
- Position: Midfielder

International career
Years	Team	Apps	(Gls)
1928	Mexico	1	(0)

Emmanuel Guevara (born 2 February 1902, date of death unknown) was a Mexican footballer. He played in one match for the Mexico national football team in 1928. He was also part of Mexico's squad for the football tournament at the 1928 Summer Olympics.
