= 2016 UnitedHealthcare season =

UnitedHealthcare
- 2016 season
- UCI code: UHC
- Status: UCI Professional Continental
- Manager: Thierry Attias
- Main sponsor(s): UnitedHealth Group
- Based: United States
- Bicycles: Wilier Triestina

Season victories
- Stage race stages: 6

The 2016 season for the UnitedHealthcare cycling team began in January at the Tour de San Luis. The team participated in UCI Continental Circuits and UCI World Tour events when given a wildcard invitation.

== 2016 roster ==
Rider	Date of birth
Carlos Alzate (COL)	March 23, 1983 (aged 32)
Janez Brajkovič (SLO)	December 18, 1983 (aged 32)
Matthew Busche (USA)	May 9, 1985 (aged 30)
Marco Canola (ITA)	December 26, 1988 (aged 27)
Jonathan Clarke (AUS)	December 18, 1984 (aged 31)
Daniel Eaton (USA)	July 4, 1993 (aged 22)
Adrian Hegyvary (USA)	January 15, 1984 (aged 31)
Daniel Jaramillo (COL)	January 15, 1991 (aged 24)

Rider	Date of birth
Christopher Jones (USA)	August 6, 1979 (aged 36)
Luke Keough (USA)	August 10, 1991 (aged 24)
Tyler Magner (USA)	May 3, 1991 (aged 24)
Karl Menzies (AUS)	June 17, 1977 (aged 38)
John Murphy (USA)	December 15, 1984 (aged 31)
Tanner Putt (USA)	April 21, 1992 (aged 23)
Daniel Summerhill (USA)	January 28, 1989 (aged 26)
Bradley White (USA)	January 15, 1982 (aged 33)

Riders who joined the team for the 2016 season

Rider	2015 team
Daniel Jaramillo	Jamis–Hagens Berman
Daniel Eaton	Axeon–Hagens Berman
Tyler Magner	Hincapie Racing Team
Matthew Busche	Trek Factory Racing

Riders who left the team during or after the 2015 season

Rider	2016 team
Daniele Ratto	Androni Giocattoli–Sidermec
Robert Förster	Retired
Kiel Reijnen	Trek–Segafredo
Alessandro Bazzana	??
Lucas Euser	??
Federico Zurlo	Lampre–Merida
Davide Frattini	Retired
Ken Hanson	Retired
Isaac Bolívar	??
Hilton Clarke	CylanceIncycle

== Season victories ==
Date	Race	Competition	Rider	Country	Location
6 February	Herald Sun Tour, Stage 3	UCI Oceania Tour	John Murphy (USA)	Australia	Inverloch
26 February	Tour de Langkawi, Stage 3	UCI Asia Tour	John Murphy (USA)	Malaysia	Kuala Kangsar
2 March	Tour de Langkawi, Teams classification	UCI Asia Tour	(Note: The riders on the squad were Janez Brajkovič, Jonathan Clarke, Daniel Jaramillo, Tyler Magner, John Murphy and Tanner Putt)	Malaysia	
10 March	Tour de Taiwan, Points classification	UCI Asia Tour	Marco Canola (ITA)	Taiwan	
23 April	Joe Martin Stage Race, Stage 3	UCI America Tour	Carlos Alzate (COL)	United States	Prairie Grove
8 May	Tour of the Gila, Stage 5	UCI America Tour	Daniel Jaramillo (COL)	United States	Pinos Altos
8 May	Tour of the Gila, Mountains classification	UCI America Tour	Daniel Jaramillo (COL)	United States	
8 May	Tour of the Gila, Teams classification	UCI America Tour	(Note: The riders on the squad were Janez Brajkovič, Matthew Busche, Marco Canola, Jonathan Clarke, Daniel Eaton, Daniel Jaramillo, Christopher Jones and Tanner Putt)	United States	
2 June	Tour of Japan, Stage 5	UCI Asia Tour	Daniel Jaramillo (COL)	Japan	Minami Shinshu
2 September	Tour of Alberta, Stage 2	UCI America Tour	Tanner Putt (USA)	Canada	Olds
