= Sunny King Criterium =

Race details
- Date: April/May
- Region: Anniston, Alabama
- Discipline: Road
- Competition: USA Cycling Pro Road Tour
- Type: Criterium
- Organiser: Anniston Cycling

History
- First edition: 2003
- Editions: 21 (as of 2024)
- First winner: Chandler Weeks (USA)
- Most wins: Juan José Haedo (ARG); Carlos Alzate (COL); Alfredo Rodríguez (MEX); (2 wins)
- Most recent: Alfredo Rodríguez (MEX)

History (women)
- First winner: Tina Pic (USA)
- Most wins: Tina Pic (USA); Coryn Rivera (USA); (2 wins)
- Most recent: Kendall Ryan (USA)

The Sunny King Criterium is a criterium cycling race held annually in Anniston, Alabama since 2003.

== Winners ==
=== Men ===
Year	Winner	Second	Third
2003	(United States) Chandler Weeks		
2004	(United States) David McCook		
2005	(Argentina) Juan José Haedo		
2006	(Argentina) Juan José Haedo	(Cuba) Iván Domínguez	(Australia) Jeffrey Hopkins
2007	(Cuba) Frank Travieso	(Argentina) Alejandro Borrajo	(Italy) Luca Damiani
2008	(Australia) Hilton Clarke	(Australia) Karl Menzies	(Australia) Caleb Manion
2009	(Australia) Karl Menzies	(United States) Kyle Wamsley	(United States) John Murphy
2010	(Australia) Ben Kersten	(Australia) Hilton Clarke	(Italy) Alessandro Bazzana
2011	(Australia) Jonathan Cantwell	(New Zealand) Michael Northey	(United States) Rahsaan Bahati
2012	(United States) Isaac Howe	(Colombia) Carlos Alzate	(United States) Kyle Wamsley
2013	(Colombia) Carlos Alzate	(United States) Sergio Hernandez	(Australia) Karl Menzies
2014	(Colombia) Carlos Alzate	(Argentina) Ricardo Escuela	(United States) David Guttenplan
2015	(United States) Tyler Magner	(United States) Luke Keough	(Australia) Hilton Clarke
2016	(United States) Travis McCabe	(United States) Michael Hernandez	(Slovenia) Aldo Ino Ilešič
2017	(United States) John Murphy	(Colombia) Carlos Alzate	(Australia) Karl Menzies
2018	(Colombia) Bryan Gómez	(United States) Brendan Rhim	(Cuba) Rubén Companioni
2019	(United States) Eric Young	(Mexico) Alfredo Rodríguez	(United States) Frank Travieso
2020	Cancelled		
2021	(United States) Tanner Ward	(United States) Michael Hernandez	(United States) Thomas Gibbons
2022	(Mexico) Alfredo Rodríguez	(United States) Thomas Gibbons	(United States) Tyler Magner
2023	(United States) Cade Bickmore	(Mexico) Alfredo Rodríguez	(United States) Tyler Magner
2024	(Mexico) Alfredo Rodríguez	(Colombia) Bryan Gómez	(Uruguay) Roderick Asconeguy

=== Women ===
Year	Winner	Second	Third
2006	(United States) Tina Pic		
2007	(United States) Laura Van Gilder	(United States) Tina Pic	(United States) Sarah Caravella
2008	(United States) Tina Pic	(United States) Kelly Benjamin	(United States) Jen McCrae
2009	(United States) Brooke Miller	(United States) Tina Pic	(United States) Laura Van Gilder
2010	(United States) Nichole Wangsgard	(South Africa) Carla Swart	(United States) Jacquelyn Crowell
2011	(United States) Janel Holcomb	(United States) Samantha Schneider	(United States) Kelly Benjamin
2012	(United States) Erica Allar	(United States) Jade Wilcoxson	(United States) Laura Van Gilder
2013	(United States) Coryn Rivera	(United States) Erica Allar	(United States) Jennifer Purcell
2014	(United States) Coryn Rivera	(United States) Erica Allar	(United States) Morgan Brown
2015	(United States) Hannah Barnes	(United States) Coryn Rivera	(United States) Erica Allar
2016	(United States) Samantha Schneider	(United States) Sarah Fader	(United States) Skylar Schneider
2017	(United States) Lauren Hall	(United States) Erica Allar	(United States) Kendall Ryan
2018	(United States) Lily Williams	(Australia) Lauretta Hanson	(United Kingdom) Harriet Owen
2019	(United States) Summer Moak	(United States) Laura Jorgensen	(Venezuela) Danielys García
2020	Cancelled		
2021	(United Kingdom) Harriet Owen	(United States) Emily Ehrlich	(United Kingdom) Rachel Langdon
2022	(United States) Skylar Schneider	(Canada) Maggie Coles-Lyster	(United States) Alexis Ryan
2023	(Mexico) Lizbeth Salazar	(United States) Kendall Ryan	(Canada) Sarah Van Dam
2024	(United States) Kendall Ryan	(United States) Alexis Magner	(United Kingdom) Harriet Owen
