= Harlem Skyscraper Classic =

American single-day road cycling race

Race details
- Date: June
- Region: Harlem, New York City
- Discipline: Road
- Competition: National calendar
- Type: One-day race
- Organiser: Unity Sports Productions
- Race director: Richard Cox

History
- First edition: 1973
- Editions: 51 (as of 2025)
- Most recent: Silias Motzkus (GER)

History (women)
- Most recent: Kimberly Stoveld (USA)

The Harlem Skyscraper Classic is a single-day road cycling race held on Father's Day in Harlem, New York City.

The race was founded by New York City Police Department officer David Walker as a way to encourage children to ride bicycles. Upon his death in 2008, his son David C. Walker took over the running of the event, assisted by former professional cyclist John Eustice and his company Sparta Cycling.

== Winners ==
=== Men ===
Year	Winner	Second	Third
2000	(Australia) Jeffrey Hopkins	(New Zealand) Graeme Miller	(Dominican Republic) Rosevelt Marte
2001-2002	?		
2003	(Argentina) Juan José Haedo		
2004	?		
2005	(Dominican Republic) Rosevelt Marte	(Uruguay) Alvaro Tardáguila	(United States) Kevin Molloy
2006	(United States) Gregory Wolf	(United States) John Loehner	(Colombia) Lisban Quintero
2007	(United States) Amaury Pérez	(Colombia) Lisban Quintero	(United States) Adam Myerson
2008	(United States) Eric Barlevav	(United States) Rahsaan Bahati	(United States) Jake Keough
2009	(Guyana) Jermaines Burrowes	(Colombia) Lisban Quintero	(Australia) Douglas Repacholi
2010	(Germany) Christian Grasmann	(Germany) Leif Lampater	(Dominican Republic) Melito Heredia
2011 ·	(Germany) Leif Lampater	(United States) Bobby Lea	(Argentina) Aníbal Borrajo
2012	(United States) Jake Keough	(Trinidad and Tobago) Emile Abraham	(United States) Luke Keough
2013	(Germany) Marcel Kalz	(Netherlands) Yondi Schmidt	(Dominican Republic) Euris Vidal
2014	(Austria) Andreas Graf	(Dominican Republic) Stalin Quiterio	(Germany) Helmut Trettwer
2015	(United States) Evan Murphy	(Curaçao) Quinten Winkel	(United States) Mike Margarite
2016	(Germany) Marcel Kalz	(New Zealand) Luke Mudgway	(New Zealand) Patrick Jones
2017	(United States) Thomas Gibbons	(Guyana) Hamzah Eastman	(Australia) Stephen Hall
2018	(United States) Justin Williams	(United States) Shane Kline	(Australia) Scott Law
2019	(United States) Justin Williams	(United States) Sean McElroy	(Dominican Republic) César Marte
2020	Cancelled		
2021	(Guyana) Romello Crawford	(United States) Sam Rosenholtz	(United States) David Dawson
2022	(Mexico) Alfredo Rodríguez	(United States) Daniel Estevez	(Venezuela) Clever Martínez
2023	(Guyana) Jamal John	(Trinidad and Tobago) Adam Alexander	(Mexico) Francisco Lara
2024	(Germany) Sebastian Motzkus	(United States) Robin Carpenter	(Germany) Andreas Mayr
2025	(Germany) Silias Motzkus	(Germany) Dario Rapps	(United Kingdom) Jim Brown

=== Women ===
Year	Winner	Second	Third
2000	(New Zealand) Joanne Kiesanowski	(New Zealand) Tania Duff-Miller	(United States) Elizabeth Varnai
2001-2004	?		
2005	(United States) Megan Esmonde	(United States) Rebecca Larson	(United States) Hannah Long
2006	(United States) Caryl Gale	(United States) Sarah Chubb Sauvayre	(United States) Camie Kornely
2007	(United States) Camie Kornely	(United States) Katherine Lambden	(United States) Sarah Chubb Sauvayre
2008	(United States) Jamie Nicholson-Leener	(United States) Lisa Jellett	(United States) Jacqueline Paull
2009	(United States) Rachel Herring	(United States) Colleen Hayduk	(United States) Jamie Nicholson-Leener
2010	(United States) Laura Van Gilder	(Australia) Laura McCaughey	(United States) Kimberly Edwards
2011 ·	(United States) Kristin Lotito	(United States) Kimberly Edwards	(United States) Caryl Gale
2012	(United States) Laura Van Gilder	(United States) Mandy Marquardt	(United States) Kimberly Edwards
2013	(United States) Amy Cutler	(United States) Fabienne Gerard	(Australia) Sequoia Cooper
2014	(United States) Kristin Lotito	(United Kingdom) Gabriella Durrin	(United States) Emily Underwood
2015	(New Zealand) Joanne Kiesanowski	(United States) Kendall Ryan	(United States) Emily Underwood
2016	(New Zealand) Alysha Keith	(United States) Colleen Gulick	(United States) Emily Underwood
2017	(United States) Laura Van Gilder	(New Zealand) Alysha Keith	(United States) Gray Pratton
2018	(United States) Samantha Schneider	(Mexico) Yussely Mendivil	(Switzerland) Caroline Baur
2019	(United States) Megan Jastrab	(Australia) Rebecca Wiasak	(United States) Colleen Gulick
2020	annulé		
2021	(United States) Melanie Wong	(United States) Tiffany Thomas	(United States) Colleen Gulick
2022	(Canada) Maggie Coles-Lyster	(Chile) Paola Muñoz	(United States) Kendall Ryan
2023	(United States) Emily Singleton	(United States) Katerina Gregoriou	(United States) Laura Van Gilder
2024	(United States) Kendall Ryan	(Barbados) Amber Joseph	(United States) Colleen Glick
2025	(United States) Kimberly Stoveld	(Australia) Claudia Marcks	(United States) Julianna Rutecki
