= Rochester Twilight Criterium =

Race details
- Date: August
- Region: Rochester, New York
- Discipline: Road
- Competition: National calendar
- Type: Criterium
- Web site: rochestercrit.com

History
- First edition: 2004
- Editions: 10
- Final edition: 2022 (men); 2022 (women)
- First winner: José Alejandro (USA)
- Most wins: Hilton Clarke (AUS) (2 wins)
- Final winner: Robert Sroka (USA)

History (women)
- First winner: Sarah Uhl (USA)
- Most wins: No repeat winners
- Most recent: Mariana Valadez (MEX)

The Rochester Twilight Criterium was an annual professional bicycle racing event on the National Criterium Calendar of USA Cycling.

The event, a fast race on a short loop along downtown streets in Rochester, New York, started in 2004. In 2008, it was expanded into a three-day event called the Rochester Omnium, with the Twilight Criterium as its centerpiece. In 2009, the event had been planned to expand to six days, at venues throughout the Finger Lakes region; the new event would be called the Tour de New York. However, the 2009 event, including the Twilight Criterium, was canceled due to financial considerations.

In 2015, the Twilight Criterium was restarted with the intent of resuming it as an annual event. The race was held for the last time in 2019 for the men, while the women's race was hosted once more in 2022.

== Winners ==
=== Men ===
Year	Winner	Second	Third
2004	(United States) José Alejandro	(Australia) Craig McCartney	(United States) Chuck Coyle
2005	(Argentina) Juan José Haedo	(United States) Kyle Wamsley	(United States) Vassili Davidenko
2006	(Australia) Hilton Clarke	(United States) Dan Schmatz	(Argentina) Sebastián Alexandre
2007	(Australia) Hilton Clarke	(Canada) Cameron Evans	(United States) Kyle Wamsley
2008	(Canada) Dominique Rollin	(United States) Antonio Cruz	(Canada) Ryan Roth
2009-2014	No race		
2015	(Slovenia) Aldo Ino Ilešič	(Colombia) Carlos Alzate	(Canada) Ryan Aitcheson
2016	(United States) Luke Keough	(Canada) Ryan Aitcheson	(Canada) Ed Veal
2017	(United States) Curtis White	(United States) Philip Short	(Canada) Jeff Schiller
2018	(Canada) Jeff Schiller	(United States) Scott McGill	(Canada) Trevor O'Donnell
2019	(United States) Robert Sroka	(United States) Connor Sallee	(Dominican Republic) Cesar Marte
2020-2021	No race		
2022	Cancelled Due to Weather		

=== Women ===
Year	Winner	Second	Third
2006	(United States) Sarah Uhl	(United States) Lauren Franges	(Australia) Sarah Ulmer
2007	(Australia) Jessie MacLean	(United States) Anna Lang	(United States) Theresa Cliff-Ryan
2008-2014	Non-disputé		
2015	(Canada) Tara Whitten	(United States) Samantha Schneider	(United States) Erica Allar
2016	(United States) Skylar Schneider	(Netherlands) Iris Slappendel	(United States) Samantha Schneider
2017	(Australia) Rebecca Wiasak	(United States) Erica Allar	(United States) Skylar Schneider
2018	(Australia) Josie Talbot	(Australia) Georgia Baker	(Canada) Miriam Brouwer
2020-2021	No race		
2022	(Mexico) Mariana Valadez	(United States) Colleen Gulick	(United States) Andrea Cyr

The Omnium logo

The proposed Tour de New York logo
