= Athens Twilight Criterium =

Cycling race in Athens, Georgia

Coordinates: 33°57′33″N 83°22′38″W

Race details
- Date: Late April
- Region: Athens, Georgia, U.S.
- Nickname(s): Twilight, Twilight Series
- Discipline: Road
- Competition: Professional and amateurs
- Type: Two-day event
- Web site: athenstwilight.com

History
- First edition: 1980

The Athens Twilight Criterium (also known as the Twilight Series or simply Twilight) is an annual professional road cycling event held each spring in Athens, Georgia, United States, since 1980. Over the course of the Twilight weekend, competitive events in a variety of fields are staged, including BMX racing and trick contests, a kids' criterium, and a mountain bike or "Fat Tire" criterium, building to the principal event of the weekend: the Twilight Criterium itself. The weekend features both amateur and professional races, with separate prizes for each.

The Twilight Criterium itself is a professional race held on a four-corner, 1 km (0.621 mi) course in downtown Athens, with the men's race covering 80 km (49.7 mi) and the women's race covering 40 km (24.9 mi). As of 2024, the event offered a combined prize purse of $120,000 across the men's and women's professional fields, with the main criterium win worth more than US$10,000.

== History ==
The race was founded in 1980 by Gene Dixon, who had opened a bicycle shop in Athens in 1973 and was introduced to European-style criterium racing by a friend who had competed overseas. Dixon scheduled the race for the evening to avoid the heat of the Georgia summer, giving the event its name. Car dealer Buddy Allen served as the race's first sponsor, and then-mayor Lauren Coile supported its early development. Notable winners of the men's race in its first two decades included Danny Clark of Australia, who won the inaugural editions in 1980 and 1981; Steve Bauer, winner in 1982; Davis Phinney, winner in 1984; Steve Hegg, winner in 1985 shortly after his gold medal in the individual pursuit at the 1984 Summer Olympics; Jeff Pierce, winner in 1987; and Chris Horner, winner in 1996.

By its 40th anniversary in 2019, the race was drawing an estimated 40,000 visitors to downtown Athens, according to the Athens Convention and Visitors Bureau. The 2020 edition was cancelled due to the COVID-19 pandemic, and the 2021 edition was rescheduled from its usual spring date to late August. The race returned to its traditional late-April date in 2022 and marked its 45th and 46th runnings in 2025 and 2026, respectively.

== Past winners ==
Key: Course record

=== Men's 80K ===
Year	Date	Winner	Time (h:m:s)	Second	Time (h:m:s)	Third	Time (h:m:s)	Sources
2017	April 29	John Murphy (USA)		Tyler Magner (USA)		Julio Padilla (GTM)		
2018	April 30	John Murphy (USA)	01:31:14.039	Bryan Gómez (COL)	01:31:14.559	Frank Travieso (USA)	01:31:14.746	
2019	April 27	Roderick Asconeguy (URY)	01:35:22.044	Daniel Summerhill (USA)	01:35:22.554	John Harris (USA)	01:35:25.337	
2020		Cancelled due to Pandemic						
2021	August 20–21 (Note: The 2021 edition was rescheduled from its usual spring date due to the COVID-19 pandemic.)	Tyler Williams (USA)	1:42:02	Daniel Summerhill (USA)	1:42:03	Spencer Moavenzadeh (USA)	1:42:03	
2022	April 30	Bryan Gómez (COL)		Tyler Magner (USA)		Liam White (AUS)		
2023	April 22	Bryan Gómez (COL)		Danny Summerhill (USA)		Robin Carpenter (USA)		
2024	April 27	Thomas Gibbons (USA)	01:42:30	Danny Summerhill (USA)	01:42:39	Robin Carpenter (USA)	01:42:39	
2025	April 26	Clever Martinez (VEN)	01:34:39	Will Hardin (USA)	01:34:41	Jim Brown (GBR)		
2026	April 18	Lucas Bourgoyne (USA)		Brody McDonald (USA)		Julien Ruhe (USA)		

=== Women's 40K ===
Year	Date	Winner	Time (h:m:s)	Second	Time (h:m:s)	Third	Time (h:m:s)	Sources
2017	April 29	Petra Mullens (AUS)		Rebecca Wiasak (AUS)		Tina Pic (USA)		
2018	April 30	Samantha Schneider (USA)	01:02:29.315	Erica Allar (USA)	01:02:29.341	Harriet Owen (ENG)	01:02:29.467	
2019	April 27	Julie Kuliecza (USA)	55:06.645	Michaela Drummond (NZL)	55:06.750	Emily Spence (USA)	55:06.845	
2020		Cancelled due to Pandemic						
2021	August 20–21	Skylar Schneider (USA)	1:02:27	Maggie Coles-Lyster (CAN)	1:02:27	Rachel Langdon (GBR)	1:02:28	
2022	April 30	Kendall Ryan (USA)		Alexis Ryan (USA)		Jennifer Valente (USA)		
2023	April 22	Alexis Ryan (USA)		Andrea Cyr (USA)		Erica Zaveta (USA)		
2024	April 27	Alexis Magner (USA)	01:04:39	Coryn Labecki (USA)	01:04:40	Harriet Owen (ENG)	01:04:40	
2025	April 26	Alexis Magner (USA)	00:56:42	Arielle Verhaaren (USA)		Kendall Ryan (USA)		
2026	April 18	Kendall Ryan (USA)		Ivanie Blondin (CAN)		Arielle Verhaaren (USA)		
