= Karl Menzies =

Australian racing cyclist (born 1977)

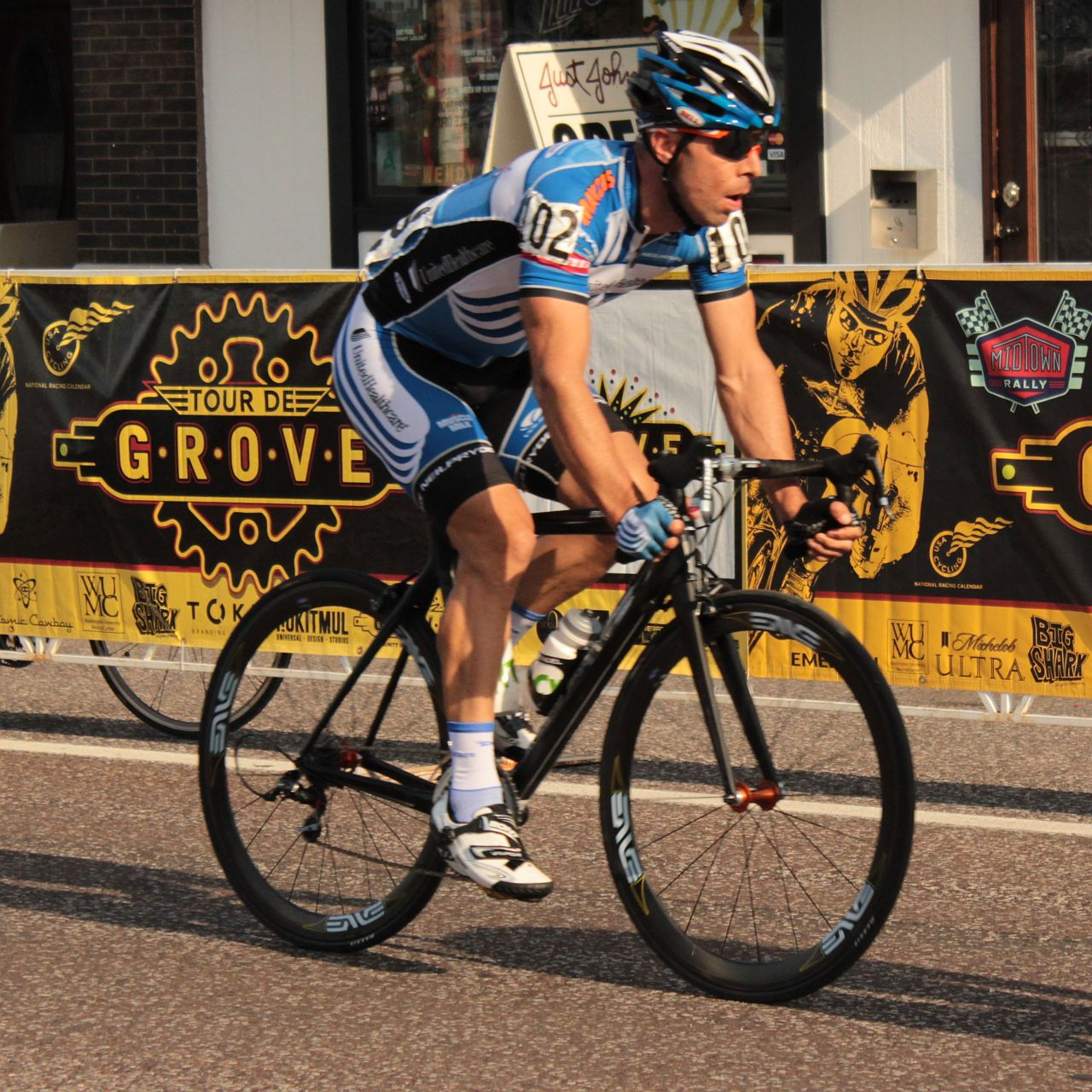

Personal information
- Full name: Karl Menzies
- Born: 17 June 1977 (age 49) Devonport, Australia
- Height: 1.85 m (6 ft 1 in)
- Weight: 86 kg (190 lb)

Cycling career
- Sport: Cycling
- Current team: Retired
- Discipline: Road
- Role: Rider

Amateur teams
- 2000: Nortas
- 2001: Australian Abalone Exports
- 2002: Giant Tas
- 2002: City of Melbourne
- 2004: Team MGZT
- 2004: Bicycle Superstore

Professional teams
- 2005: Advantage Benefits–Endeavour
- 2006–2016: Health Net–Maxxis
- 2017: Cylance Pro Cycling

Karl Menzies (born 17 June 1977) is an Australian former professional road bicycle racer. He finished second in the 2006 USA Cycling National Racing Calendar to Floyd Landis. Menzies turned professional in 2005, he spent one season on the Advantage Benefits/Endeavour team.

In 2006, he won the Nature Valley Grand Prix, ahead of teammate Greg Henderson. In 2005, he finished first overall at the International Cycling Classic. In 2007, he won stage 1 of the Jacob's Creek Tour Down Under and was the overall winner at the International Tour de Toona stage race.

== Major results ==
2001
1st Stage 1 Tour of Southland
2004
3rd Overall Tour de Korea
3rd Overall Tour of Wellington
5th Overall Herald Sun Tour

1st Stage 1

2005
1st Overall International Cycling Classic

1st Stage 2

2nd Overall Joe Martin Stage Race
3rd Overall San Dimas Stage Race
4th Wachovia Invitational
8th Overall Tour of Southland

1st Stage 2

2006
1st Overall Nature Valley Grand Prix

1st Stage 4

1st Stage 6 International Cycling Classic
1st Stage 2 Redlands Classic
1st Stage 1 Tour de Toona
1st Stage 2 Tour de Nez
2nd Overall USA Cycling National Racing Calendar
2nd Sea Otter Classic
7th Overall Herald Sun Tour

1st Stage 2

7th Trophée des Grimpeurs
2007
1st Overall Tour de Toona

1st Stages 2, 5 & 7

1st Stages 2 & 4 Joe Martin Stage Race
2nd Overall Tour Down Under

1st Stage 2

3rd Road race, National Road Championships
2008
2nd Lancaster Classic
3rd CSC Invitational
2009
1st Overall Tour of Elk Grove
1st Sunny King Criterium
3rd Clarendon Cup
2010
1st Overall Tour de Murrieta
1st Athens Twilight Criterium
1st Stage 11 Tour of America's Dairyland
1st Stage 4 Joe Martin Stage Race
3rd Overall Tour of Elk Grove
2011
1st Prologue Tour of Elk Grove
2nd Tour of Somerville
2013
2nd Tour of Somerville
2nd Intelligentsia Cup
3rd Overall Tulsa Tough
3rd Sunny King Criterium
5th USA Crits Finals, Las Vegas
2015
1st Dana Point Grand Prix
1st Stage 3 Gateway Cup
2nd Wilmington Grand Prix
2017
3rd Sunny King Criterium
3rd Dana Point Grand Prix
