= Armed Forces Association Cycling Classic =

American multi-day road cycling race

The Armed Forces Cycling Classic (formerly known as the Air Force Association Cycling Classic) refers to a weekend of road bicycle racing events held annually in June in Arlington County, Virginia. The weekend consists of several amateur events, and two professional races in the criterium format, the Clarendon Cup and the Crystal City Cup. The main sponsor for the race is Boeing. The race is conducted under the rules of the governing bodies of professional cycling, the Union Cycliste Internationale and USA Cycling.

== Clarendon Cup ==
Clarendon Cup
Race details
- Date: June
- Region: United States
- Discipline: Road race
- Type: One-day race
- Organiser: Arlington Sports

History (men)
- First edition: 1998
- Editions: 24 (as of 2022)
- First winner: Scott Mercer (USA)
- Most wins: Hilton Clarke (AUS) (3 wins)
- Most recent: Brendan Rhim (USA)

Women's history
- First edition: 1998
- Editions: 24 (as of 2022)
- First winner: Brenda Brashears (USA)
- Most wins: Laura Van Gilder (USA) (3 wins)
- Most recent: Kendall Ryan (USA)

The Clarendon Cup, known as the CSC Invitational (from 2004 to 2008, is a 1 km long criterium race of Arlington County, Virginia. It is open to amateurs and professionals and has been running since 1998 for men and women. It was formerly part of USA Cycling's National Racing Calendar, and the National Criterium Calendar. It is currently part of USA Cycling's Pro Road Tour https://www.usacycling.org/national-calendars/pro-road-tour.

=== Winners ===
==== Men ====
Year	Country	Rider	Team
1998	United States	Scott Mercer	Breakaway Couriers
1999	United States	Todd Littlehales	Navigators
2000	United States	David McCook	Shaklee
2001	Netherlands	Jans Koerts	Mercury–Viatel
2002	Russia	Vassili Davidenko	Navigators
2003	United States	Jonas Carney	Prime Alliance Cycling Team
2004	Denmark	Lars Michaelsen	Team CSC
2005	Cuba	Iván Domínguez	Health Net–Maxxis
2006	United States	Mark McCormack	Colavita–Sutter Home
2007	United States	Rahsaan Bahati	Rock Racing
2008	Italy	Luca Damiani	Colavita–Sutter Home
2009	Argentina	Alejandro Borrajo	Colavita–Sutter Home
2010	Australia	Hilton Clarke	UnitedHealthcare–Maxxis
2011	Australia	Hilton Clarke	UnitedHealthcare
2012	Germany	Robert Förster	UnitedHealthcare
2013	Slovenia	Aldo Ino Ilešič	UnitedHealthcare
2014	United States	Kiel Reijnen	UnitedHealthcare
2015	Australia	Hilton Clarke	UnitedHealthcare
2016	United States	Tyler Magner	UnitedHealthcare
2017	Colombia	Carlos Alzate	UnitedHealthcare
2018	United States	Eric Marcotte	UnitedHealthcare
2019	United States	Eric Young	Elevate–KHS Pro Cycling
2020	No race due to the COVID-19 pandemic in Virginia		
2021	United States	Stephen Vogel	Project Echelon
2022	United States	Brendan Rhim	Wildlife Generation Pro Cycling

==== Women ====
Year	Country	Rider	Team
1998	United States	Brenda Brashears	Powerbar
1999	United States	Nicole Reinhart	Saturn Cycling Team
2000	United States	Nicole Reinhart	Saturn Cycling Team
2001	Germany	Ina-Yoko Teutenberg	Saturn Cycling Team
2002	Germany	Ina-Yoko Teutenberg	Saturn Cycling Team
2003	United States	Laura Van Gilder	Saturn Cycling Team
2004	Canada	Gina Grain	Victory Brewing Company
2005	United States	Laura Van Gilder	Saturn Cycling Team
2006	United States	Tina Pic	Colavita Olive Oil–Sutter Home Wines
2007	United States	Laura Van Gilder	Cheerwine Cycling Team
2008	New Zealand	Cath Cheatley	Cheerwine Cycling Team
2009	United States	Erica Allar	BMW/Bianchi
2010	United States	Brooke Miller	Team TIBCO–To The Top
2011	Canada	Joëlle Numainville	Team TIBCO–To The Top
2012	United States	Emma Grant	Optum Pro Cycling
2013	United States	Amanda Miller	Team TIBCO–To The Top
2014	United States	Tina Pic	DNA Cycling p/b K4
2015	United States	Lauren Stephens	Team TIBCO–SVB
2016	United States	Coryn Rivera	UnitedHealthcare
2017	Cuba	Marlies Mejías García	Weber Shimano Ladies Power
2018	Canada	Alison Jackson	Tibco–Silicon Valley Bank
2019	United States	Kendall Ryan	Tibco–Silicon Valley Bank
2020	No race due to the COVID-19 pandemic in Virginia		
2021	Canada	Maggie Coles-Lyster	DNA Pro Cycling
2022	United States	Kendall Ryan	L39ION of Los Angeles

== Crystal Cup ==
Crystal Cup
Race details
- Date: June
- Region: United States
- Discipline: Road race
- Type: One-day race
- Organiser: Arlington Sports

History (men)
- First edition: 2007
- Editions: 15 (as of 2022)
- First winner: Kyle Wamsley (USA)
- Most wins: Jake Keough (USA); Tyler Magner (USA); (3 wins)
- Most recent: Tyler Magner (USA)

Women's history
- First edition: 2007
- Editions: 13 (as of 2022)
- First winner: Laura Van Gilder (USA)
- Most wins: Kendall Ryan (USA) (4 wins)
- Most recent: Kendall Ryan (USA)

The Crystal Cup, is also a criterium race, taking place on a 1.3 km course in Crystal City, Virginia. It is open to amateurs and professionals and has been running since 2007 for men and women, except for the 2008 and 2009 editions when there was no women's race held, and the men took part in a circuit race rather than a criterium. It is held on the Sunday of the weekend of racing.

=== Winners ===
==== Men ====
Year	Country	Rider	Team
2007	United States	Kyle Wamsley	Navigators Insurance
2008	Argentina	Lucas Sebastián Haedo	Colavita–Sutter Home
2009	United States	Shawn Milne	Team Type 1
2010	United States	Jake Keough	UnitedHealthcare–Maxxis
2011	United States	Jake Keough	UnitedHealthcare
2012	United States	Jake Keough	UnitedHealthcare
2013	Argentina	Juan José Haedo	Jamis–Hagens Berman
2014	United States	Kiel Reijnen	UnitedHealthcare
2015	Australia	Hilton Clarke	UnitedHealthcare
2016	United States	Tyler Magner	UnitedHealthcare
2017	United States	Tyler Magner	Holowesko Citadel Racing Team
2018	United States	Cory Williams	Elevate–KHS Pro Cycling
2019	United States	Eric Young	Elevate–KHS Pro Cycling
2020	No race due to the COVID-19 pandemic in Virginia		
2021	United States	Connor Sallee	ButcherBox Cycling
2022	United States	Tyler Magner	L39ION of Los Angeles

==== Women ====
Year	Country	Rider	Team
2007	United States	Laura Van Gilder	Cheerwine Cycling Team
2008– 2009	No race		
2010	United States	Robin Farina	Team Vera Bradley Professional Cycling
2011	Canada	Leah Kirchmann	Colavita–Forno d'Asolo
2012	United States	Sarah Fader	Pepper Palace/Spin-Tech Training
2013	United States	Lauren Stephens	Team TIBCO–To The Top
2014	United States	Tina Pic	Fearless Femme
2015	United States	Coryn Rivera	UnitedHealthcare
2016	United States	Coryn Rivera	UnitedHealthcare
2017	United States	Laura Van Gilder	Mellow Mushrooms p/b Warner Construction Consultants
2018	United States	Kendall Ryan	Tibco–Silicon Valley Bank
2019	United States	Kendall Ryan	Tibco–Silicon Valley Bank
2020	No race due to the COVID-19 pandemic in Virginia		
2021	United States	Kendall Ryan	L39ION of Los Angeles
2022	United States	Kendall Ryan	L39ION of Los Angeles
