= Frank Travieso =

Cuban-born American cyclist

Personal information
- Born: 2 March 1980 (age 46) Havana, Cuba

Cycling career
- Sport: Cycling
- Current team: WHBH
- Discipline: Road
- Role: Rider

Amateur teams
- 2009: Porsche–Herbalife Champion
- 2012: Team Coco's
- 2014–2016: UnitedHealthCare of Georgia–The 706 Project
- 2017: 706 Project
- 2018–2019: EDA Evolution
- 2020: EDA Contractor
- 2021: Excel City Bikes
- 2022: Miami Blazers
- 2024–: WHBH

Professional teams
- 2006–2008: AEG-Toshiba Jetnetwork
- 2010: Jamis–Sutter Home
- 2011: RealCyclist.com
- 2013: Team Smartstop–Mountain Khakis
- 2023: Miami Nights

Frank Travieso (born 21 March 1980 in Havana) is a Cuban-born American cyclist.

== Major results ==
2005
1st Stage 5 Tour of Puerto Rico
2006
1st Stage 2 International Cycling Classic
2007
1st Tour of the Bahamas
1st Sunny King Criterium
1st Stages 3 & 7 Tour of Belize
9th Commerce Bank Lancaster Classic
2008
2nd Clasico Ciudad de Caracas
2009
1st Stage 6 Tour of America's Dairyland
2012
1st Carolina Cup
2013
3rd Athens Twilight Criterium
2014
3rd Athens Twilight Criterium
2015
3rd Athens Twilight Criterium
2018
3rd Athens Twilight Criterium
2019
1st Madeira Criterium
2020
1st Overall Vuelta a Nicaragua

1st Stages 1 & 3

2022
1st Stage 10 Intelligentsia Cup
