= Eric Young (cyclist) =

American cyclist

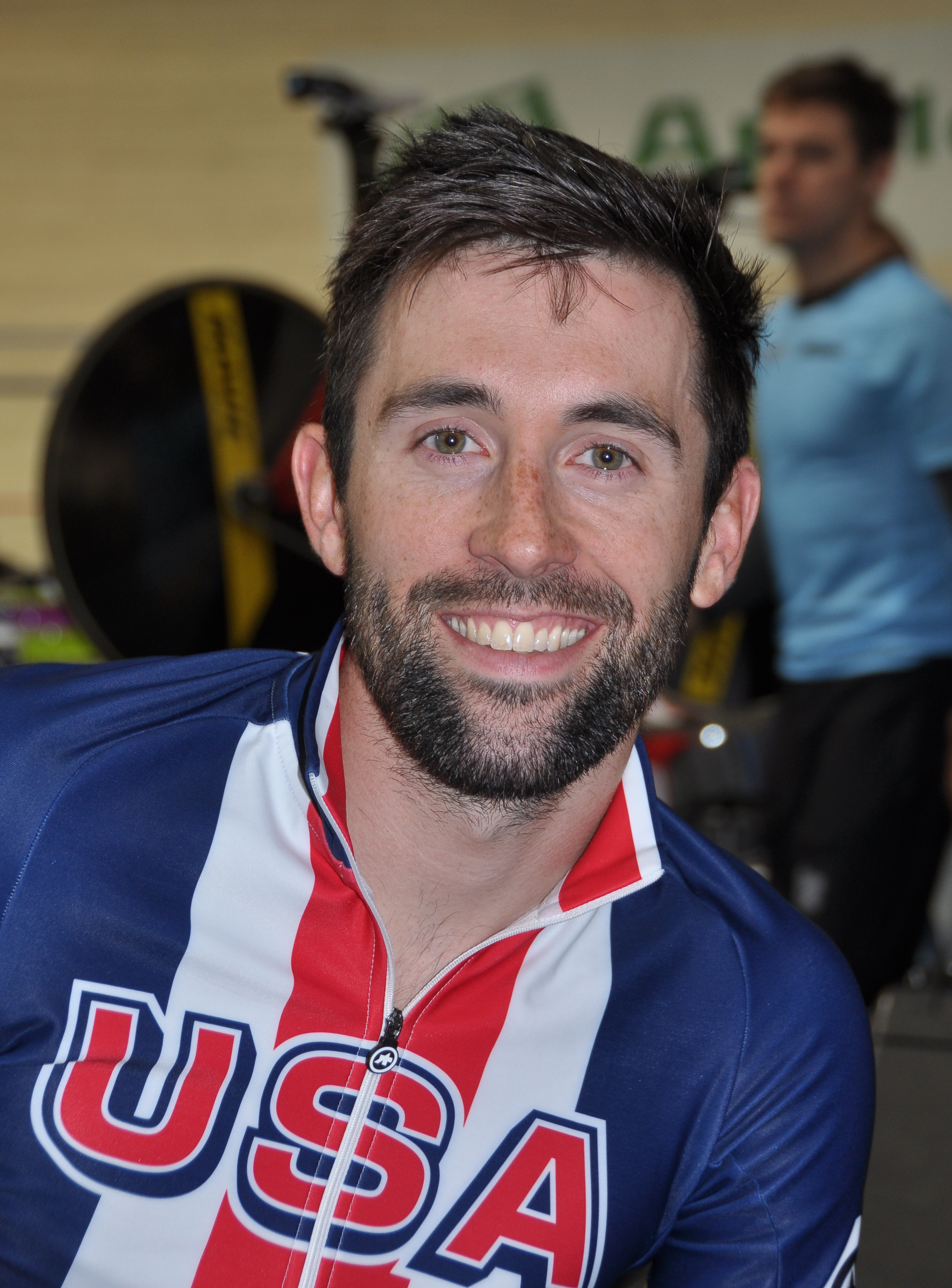
- Young at the 2018 UCI Track Cycling World Championships

Personal information
- Full name: Eric Galen Young
- Born: February 26, 1989 (age 37) Geneva, Illinois, U.S.
- Height: 1.80 m (5 ft 11 in)
- Weight: 74.8 kg (165 lb)

Cycling career
- Sport: Cycling
- Current team: Retired
- Disciplines: Road; Track
- Role: Rider
- Rider type: Sprinter

Amateur team
- 2010: Nuvo Cycling Team

Professional teams
- 2011–2012: Bissell
- 2013–2018: Optum–Kelly Benefit Strategies
- 2019–2021: Elevate–KHS Pro Cycling
Medal record
Men's track cycling
Representing United States
Pan American Championships
Gold medal – first place	2017 Couva	Points race
Gold medal – first place	2018 Aguascalientes	Team pursuit
Gold medal – first place	2019 Cochabamba	Scratch
Silver medal – second place	2017 Couva	Team pursuit
Silver medal – second place	2019 Cochabamba	Team pursuit

Eric Galen Young (born February 26, 1989) is an American former professional racing cyclist. Young won the United States National Criterium Championships in both 2011, while riding with Bissell, and in 2013, while riding with Optum–Kelly Benefit Strategies. Before turning professional, Young attended Indiana University Bloomington and won the Little 500 with the "Cutters" team three years.

In 2015, Young won the second stage of the Tour of the Gila in a bunch sprint, beating Travis McCabe of Team SmartStop.

== Major results ==
=== Road ===
2011
1st National Criterium Championships
1st Glencoe Grand Prix
1st Stage 1 Gateway Cup
3rd Tour of Somerville
4th Univest Grand Prix
2012
Tour of the Gila

1st Points classification
1st Stage 2

1st Stage 3 San Dimas Stage Race
1st Stage 4 Joe Martin Stage Race
4th National Criterium Championships
2013
1st National Criterium Championships
Tour de Korea

1st Stages 2 & 4

1st Stage 2 Tucson Bicycle Classic
4th Vuelta a La Rioja
10th Overall Tour of Elk Grove
2014
Grand Prix Cycliste de Saguenay

1st Stages 1 & 2

1st Stage 6 Vuelta Mexico Telmex
1st Stage 5 Tour of Utah
2015
1st Delta Road Race
Tour of the Gila

1st Points classification
1st Stage 2

1st Stage 4 Tour of Utah
2016
1st Gastown Grand Prix
1st Prologue Istrian Spring Trophy
1st Stage 4 Grand Prix Cycliste de Saguenay
10th White Spot / Delta Road Race
2017
1st Stage 3 Joe Martin Stage Race
Tour of the Gila

1st Stages 2 & 4

2018
3rd White Spot / Delta Road Race
2019
1st Crystal Cup
1st Sunny King Criterium
1st Clarendon Cup
1st Stage 4 Tour of the Gila
2nd National Criterium Championships
2020
Tour de Taiwan

1st Points classification
1st Stages 1, 4 & 5

2021
3rd National Criterium Championships

=== Track ===
2017
Pan American Championships

1st Points race
2nd Team pursuit

2017–18 UCI World Cup

3rd Team pursuit, Santiago

2018
1st Team pursuit, Pan American Championships
2019
Pan American Championships

1st Scratch
2nd Team pursuit

2018–19 UCI World Cup

2nd Team pursuit, Hong Kong
3rd Scratch, Minsk
