= USPRO National Championships =

USPRO National Championships is the name given by USA Cycling, the United States national governing body of cycling, for a series of national championships.

- United States National Road Race Championships
- United States National Criterium Championships
- United States National Time Trial Championships
