= 2017 Tour of Utah =

2017 UCI America Tour

Race details
- Dates: July 31–August 6, 2017
- Stages: 7
- Distance: 979 km (608.3 mi)
- Winning time: 22h 48' 03"

Results
	Winner	Rob Britton (CAN)	(Rally Cycling)
	Second	Gavin Mannion (USA)	(UnitedHealthcare)
	Third	Serghei Tvetcov (ROM)	(Jelly Belly–Maxxis)
	Points	Travis McCabe (USA)	(UnitedHealthcare)
	Mountains	Jacob Rathe (USA)	(Jelly Belly–Maxxis)
	Youth	Neilson Powless (USA)	(Axeon–Hagens Berman)
	Team	BMC Racing Team	

The 2017 Tour of Utah was a seven-stage road cycling race held from July 31 to August 6, 2017, and the 13th edition of the Tour of Utah. It was rated as a 2.HC on the 2017 UCI America Tour. The race was won by Rob Britton of Rally Cycling.

== Teams ==
Sixteen teams entered the race. Each team had a maximum of eight riders:

UCI WorldTeams

- BMC Racing Team

UCI Professional Continental teams

- Bardiani–CSF
- Israel Cycling Academy
- Team Novo Nordisk
- Caja Rural–Seguros RGA
- Nippo–Vini Fantini
- UnitedHealthcare

UCI Continental teams

- Amore & Vita–Selle SMP
- Cylance Pro Cycling
- Jelly Belly–Maxxis
- Silber Pro Cycling Team
- Axeon–Hagens Berman
- Elevate–KHS Pro Cycling
- Holowesko Citadel Racing Team
- Rally Cycling
- Hangar 15 Bicycles

== Overview ==
Stage 1 was won by Ty Magner.

Stage 2 was won by Brent Bookwalter.

Stage 3 was won by Rob Britton.

Stage 4 was won by John Murphy.

Stage 5 was won by Travis McCabe.

Stage 6 was won by Giulio Ciccone.

Stage 7 was won by Marco Canola.

== Final classifications ==
Final general classification

Rank	Rider	Team	Time
1	Rob Britton (CAN)	Rally Cycling	22h 48' 03"
2	Gavin Mannion (USA)	UnitedHealthcare	+ 22"
3	Serghei Țvetcov (ROM)	Jelly Belly–Maxxis	+ 32"
4	Neilson Powless (USA)	Axeon–Hagens Berman	+ 35"
5	Brent Bookwalter (USA)	BMC Racing Team	+ 2' 00"
6	Giulio Ciccone (ITA)	Bardiani–CSF	+ 2' 16"
7	Jonathan Clarke (AUS)	UnitedHealthcare	+ 2' 41"
8	Chris Butler (USA)	Caja Rural–Seguros RGA	+ 2' 47"
9	Sepp Kuss (USA)	Rally Cycling	+ 2' 55"
10	James Piccoli (CAN)	Elevate–KHS Pro Cycling	+ 3' 00"

The sprint classification was won by Travis McCabe.

The mountain classification was won by Jacob Rathe.

The youth classification was won by Neilson Powless.
