= Laura Van Gilder =

American racing cyclist

Personal information
- Full name: Laura Van Gilder
- Nickname: LVG
- Born: December 11, 1964 (age 61) Pocono Pines, Pennsylvania, U.S.
- Height: 5 ft 2 in (157 cm)
- Weight: 130 lb (59 kg)

Cycling career
- Sport: Cycling
- Current team: Mellow Mushroom
- Disciplines: Road; Cyclo-cross; Mountain biking
- Role: Rider

Amateur teams
- 2005: Quark Cycling Team
- 2006: Team Lipton
- 2008: Cheerwine
- 2009: C3-Athletes Serving Athletes
- 2009–: Mellow Mushroom Racing
- 2010: DFT p/b Treads (guest)
- 2011: NOW and Novartis for MS (guest)
- 2015: Stan's NoTubes p/b enduranceWERX (guest)
- 2018: Feed Hungry Kids Project (guest)
- 2019: Fast Chance Women's Cycling (guest)

Professional teams
- 1998–1999: Navigators
- 2000: Charles Schwab
- 2001: TalgoAmerica.com
- 2002: Trek
- 2003: Saturn
- 2007: Cheerwine

Laura Van Gilder (born December 11, 1964) is an American road bicycle racer from Cresco, Pennsylvania, who currently rides for American amateur team Mellow Mushroom Racing. Van Gilder turned professional in 1992, and represented her nation at the 2002 and 2005 UCI Road World Championships.

== Personal life ==
Van Gilder was born in Pocono Pines, Pennsylvania and attended East Stroudsburg University of Pennsylvania, earning two degrees in hospitality and hotel management.

== Major results ==
=== Road ===
1998
1st 89er Criterium
1st Street Sprints & Brick Criterium, A to Z Classic
1st Koed Calendars Criterium
1st Skyscraper Classic
1st Tour of Mt. Nebo
Bermuda GP

1st Criterium
1st Circuit race

1st Sprints classification Fitchburg Longsjo Classic
1999
1st Tour of Somerville
1st Stage 2 Superweek International Cycling
2nd BMC Tour of Houston
2nd Clarendon Cup
8th Liberty Classic
2000
1st Criterium, National Road Championships
2nd La Paz County Park Criterium
2nd McLane-Pacific Bicycle Classic
2nd NYC Women's Challenge
3rd Overall USPROTOUR
2001
1st Overall Wendy's International Cycling Classic
2nd Criterium, National Road Championships
2002
1st Overall USA Cycling National Racing Calendar
1st Overall Pro Cycling Tour
1st Overall Nature Valley Grand Prix

1st Stages 1 & 2

1st Overall Tour du Grand Montréal

1st Stages 1 & 2

1st Chris Thater Memorial Criterium
1st San Rafael Criterium
1st Tour of Somerville
International Tour de Toona

1st Sprints classification
1st Stages 4 & 5

2nd Liberty Classic
2003
1st CSC Invitational
1st Mengoni Grand Prix
1st Stage 3 Solano Bicycle Classic
1st Stage 5 International Tour de Toona
2004
1st Captech Classic Richmond
1st Stage 3 Valley of the Sun Stage Race
1st Stage 1 Pomona Valley Stage Race
1st Stage 4 Joe Martin Stage Race
1st Sprints classification Redlands Bicycle Classic
3rd Liberty Classic
2005
1st Garrett Lemire Memorial GP
1st Kelly Cup
1st CSC Invitational
1st Tour of Somerville
1st Stage 2 Central Valley Classic
3rd Liberty Classic
2006
1st Chris Thater Memorial Criterium
1st Stage 3 Nature Valley Grand Prix
1st Stage 6 International Tour de Toona
2007
1st Indio Grand Prix
1st CSC Invitational
1st Crystal Cup
1st Garrett Lemire Memorial Grand Prix
1st Spartanburg Criterium
1st Sunny King Criterium
1st Raleigh Criterium
1st BikeJam / Kelly Cup
1st Jacksonville Road Race
1st Manhattan Beach Grand Prix
1st Westchester Criterium
1st USA Crits Finals
1st Stage 2 Joe Martin Stage Race
1st Stage 4 Nature Valley Grand Prix
International Tour de Toona

1st Stages 4 & 7

3rd Reading Classic
6th Liberty Classic
2008
1st International Tour de Toona
1st Stage 1 Joe Martin Stage Race
2009
1st San Jose Cycling Classic
1st Bank of America Wilmington GP
1st Stage 3 Joe Martin Stage Race
1st Stage 1 Tulsa Tough
1st Stage 1 Tour of Elk Grove
2010
1st BikeJam / Kelly Cup
1st Wilmington Grand Prix
1st Tour de Grove
2nd Air Force Cycling Classic Clarendon Cup
2011
1st Stage 4 International Tour de Toona
8th Liberty Classic
2012
1st Overall Tour of America's Dairyland

1st Stages 1, 2 & 3

1st Historic Roswell Criterium
1st Glencoe Grand Prix
1st Harlem Skyscraper Cycling Classic
1st East Troy Cycling Classic
1st Giro d'Grafton
1st Waukesha Carl Zach Cycling Classic
1st Greenbush Road Race
1st Chris Thater Memorial
8th Liberty Classic
2013
1st Overall Tour of America's Dairyland

1st Stage 3

1st Belmont Criterium
1st East Tosa Gran Prix
1st Stage 2 Intelligentsia Cup Prairie State Cycling Series
2015
2nd Mildred Kugler Women's Open
4th Overall Tour of America's Dairyland
8th Overall Armed Forces Association Cycling Classic

=== Cyclo-cross ===
2008
1st Fogelsville cyclo-cross
1st Springfield Township Michigan cyclo-cross
1st Philadelphia cyclo-cross
1st Northampton cyclo-cross
1st Bridgeton City Park cyclo-cross
1st Highland Park cyclo-cross
1st Jamesburg cyclo-cross
1st Warwick cyclo-cross
2009
1st Nittany Lion Cross UCI C2 – MAC SERIES Race #1
1st Fogelsville cyclo-cross
1st Baltimore cyclo-cross
2010
1st Breinigsville cyclo-cross
1st Baltimore cyclo-cross
1st Lincoln cyclo-cross
1st Gloucester cyclo-cross
1st Jamesburg cyclo-cross
1st Northampton cyclo-cross
1st Warwick cyclo-cross
2011
1st Providence cyclo-cross
1st Wilmington cyclo-cross
1st Sterling cyclo-cross
2012
1st Warwick cyclo-cross
1st East Meadows cyclo-cross
