= Kendall Ryan (cyclist) =

American cyclist (born 1992)

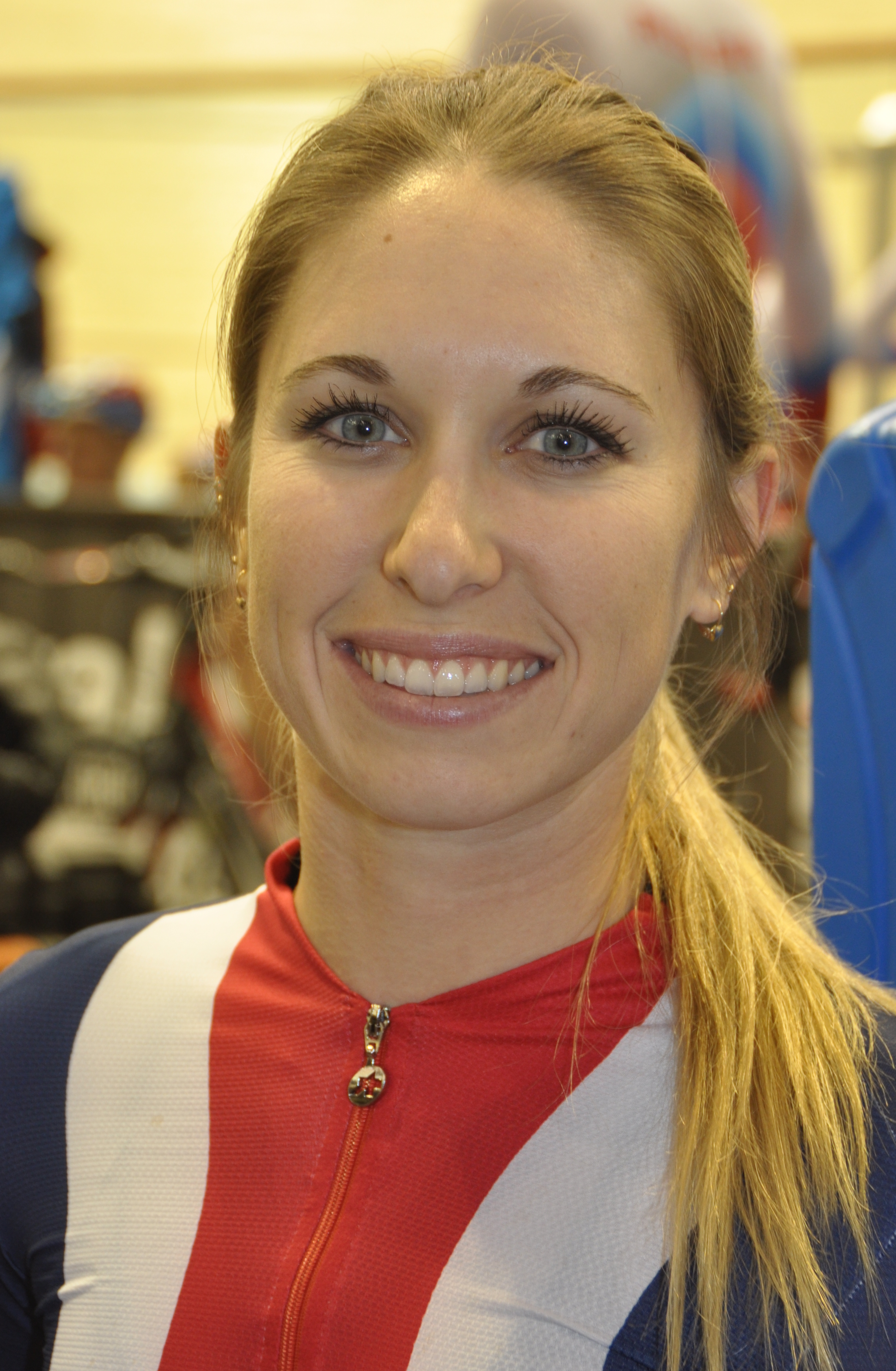
- Ryan in 2018

Personal information
- Full name: Kendall Gail Ryan
- Born: August 10, 1992 (age 34) Ventura, California, United States

Cycling career
- Sport: Cycling
- Current team: L39ION of Los Angeles
- Disciplines: Road; Track; Mountain bike racing (former)
- Role: Rider

Amateur teams
- 2013: Team Jeep
- 2021–: L39ION of Los Angeles

Professional teams
- 2011–2012: Team TIBCO–To The Top
- 2014–2020: Team TIBCO–To The Top
Medal record
Women's track cycling
Representing United States
Pan American Championships
Gold medal – first place	2019 Cochabamba	Madison
Silver medal – second place	2019 Cochabamba	Team pursuit

Kendall Gail Ryan (born August 10, 1992) is an American racing cyclist, who currently rides for UCI Continental pro cycling team, L39ION of Los Angeles. She rode at the 2014 UCI Road World Championships. She is the sister of fellow racing cyclist Alexis Ryan.

In May 2018 she won the first stage of the Amgen Tour of California, eventually coming third in the sprint standings for the race. In 2019 she won the Women's Pro race at the 2019 Air Force Association Cycling Classic.

== Major results ==
2009
1st Dana Point Grand Prix
1st Stage 3 San Dimas Stage Race
2010
1st Dana Point Grand Prix
3rd Nevada City Classic
7th GP Cento - Carnevale d'Europa
9th Scotts Valley Grand Prix
9th Sacramento Grand Prix
10th Road race, UCI Juniors Road World Championships
10th GP Liberazione
2011
5th Merced Criterium
6th Sandy Springs Cycling Challenge
7th Snelling Road Race
7th Wilmington Grand Prix
7th Athens Twilight Criterium
8th Spartanburg Regional Classic
8th Downtown Walterboro Criterium
8th Presbyterian Hospital Invitational Criterium
2012
1st Electric City Circuit
1st Stage 2 Tour de Murrieta
4th Spartanburg Regional Classic
5th Presbyterian Hospital Invitational Criterium
6th Chevron Manhattan Beach Grand Prix
7th Herman Miller Grand Cycling Classic
8th Criterium, National Road Championships
9th Air Force Cycling Classic
2014
1st Gaffney Criterium
2nd Overall Air Force Association Cycling Classic
2nd Glencoe Grand Prix
3rd Spartanburg Regional Classic
3rd Downtown Walterboro Criterium
3rd Historic Roswell Criterium
4th Chevron Manhattan Beach Grand Prix
5th Overall Tour of America's Dairyland

2nd East Troy Cycling Classic
3rd Shorewood Criterium Cycling Classic
4th ISCorp Downer Classic
7th Commonwealth Classic Fond du Lac

6th Overall Tour de Murrieta
6th Wilmington Grand Prix
2015
National Road Championships

1st Criterium
3rd Team time trial

2nd Overall Air Force Association Cycling Classic
2nd Novant Health Invitational Criterium
3rd Dana Point Grand Prix
6th Overall Tour of Utah
7th Grand Prix cycliste de Gatineau
2016
3rd Overall Air Force Association Cycling Classic
4th Mayor's Cup Boston
2017
1st Overall The Gateway Cup

1st Stage 3

1st White Spot / Delta Road Race
1st PoCo Grand Prix
1st Gastown Grand Prix
1st Dana Point Grand Prix
1st Stage 3 Valley of the Sun Stage Race
3rd Grand Prix Cycliste de Gatineau
3rd Glencoe Grand Prix
3rd Sunny King Criterium
4th Overall Tour de Murrieta

1st Stage 2

4th Armed Forces Association Cycling Classic
5th Criterium, National Road Championships
5th McClellan Road Race
2018
1st Overall Armed Forces Association Cycling Classic

1st Stage 2

1st White Spot / Delta Road Race
1st Stage 1 Tour of California
1st Stage 3 Valley of the Sun Stage Race
3rd Towards Zero Race Melbourne
Sea Otter Classic

3rd Criterium
10th Road race

7th Sunny King Criterium
2019
10th White Spot / Delta Road Race
