= Evan Murphy =

American cyclist

Personal information
- Born: March 25, 1988 (age 38)

Cycling career
- Sport: Cycling
- Role: Rider

Professional team
- 2015–2016: Lupus Racing Team

Evan Murphy (born March 25, 1988) is an American former professional racing cyclist. He rode in the men's team time trial at the 2015 UCI Road World Championships. He also won the 2015 Harlem Skyscraper Classic.
