= Kirk O'Bee =

American racing cyclist (born 1977)

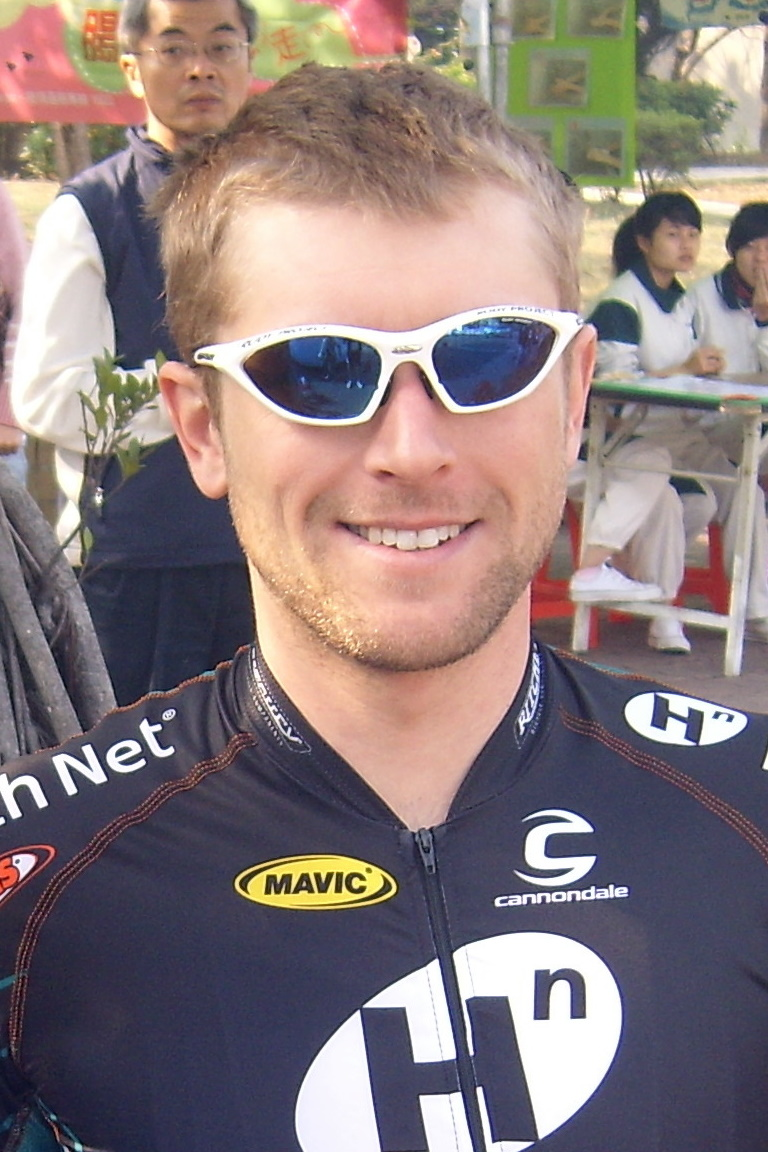
- O'Bee at the 2008 Tour de Taiwan

Personal information
- Born: April 9, 1977 (age 49) Ada, Michigan

Cycling career
- Sport: Cycling
- Current team: Retired
- Discipline: Road
- Role: Rider

Amateur team
- 1999: Ikon–Lexus

Professional teams
- 1999: Mapei–Quick-Step (stagiaire)
- 2000: U.S. Postal Service
- 2001–2005: Navigators
- 2006–2008: Health Net–Maxxis
- 2009: Bissell

Kirk O'Bee (born April 9, 1977) is a former professional road racing cyclist from the United States. He won two national championships – in 1997 the USPRO pursuit championship, and in 2001 the USPRO criterium championship.

== Doping ==
In 2002, O'Bee was suspended for a year after testing at the 2001 US championship showed an elevated testosterone-to-epitestosterone ratio. O'Bee said the positive drug test "resulted from a special training regimen recommended by his coach, which involved dietary supplements and exercise."

O'Bee was fired by the Bissell team on July 31, 2009, for a doping violation. On October 7, 2010, the United States Anti-Doping Agency handed O'Bee a lifetime ban for EPO usage. All results he obtained after October 3, 2005, were vacated.

== Major results ==
1997
1st – track pursuit,(United States National Pursuit Champion)
1999 Mapei - Quick Step
1st – Hasselt-Spa-Hasselt
1st – Lys Lez Lannoy
1st – Dunquerke-Wacuhal (Espoir)
1st – two stages, Tour de Mosselle
1st – points jersey, Tour de Mosselle
2000 – U.S. Postal Service Pro Cycling Team
2001 – Navigators Insurance Cycling Team
1st United States National Criterium Championships
2002 – Navigators Insurance Cycling Team
1st – GP Pino Cerami
1st – GP de la ville de Rennes
1st, Sprint Competition – Sea Otter Classic
2003 – Navigators Insurance Cycling Team
2004 – Navigators Insurance Cycling Team
2005 – Navigators Insurance Cycling Team
1st Overall – Tour de Delta
1st Stage 4 – Cascade Classic
1st Stage 6 – Cascade Classic
1st Stage 2 – Tour de Delta
1st – Tour de White Rock Road Race
1st Overall – Canada Cup Road Race Series
KOM – Ronde van Drenthe
KOM – Tour de White Rock
2nd – Ronde van Drenthe
5th – USPRO Championship
2006 – Health Net Pro Cycling Team Presented by Maxxis
~~1st overall – Tour de Taiwan~~
~~1st, Stage 5 – Tour de Taiwan~~
2007 – Health Net Pro Cycling Team Presented by Maxxis
~~1st stage 2 – Nature Valley Grand Prix~~
~~1st stage 4 – Nature Valley Grand Prix~~
~~1st stage 5 – Cascade Classic~~
~~1st – Tour de Gastown~~
~~1st – Giro di Burnaby~~
~~1st United States National Criterium Championships~~

== See also ==
- List of doping cases in cycling
