= Tour of America's Dairyland =

American multi-day road cycling race

Race details
- Date: June
- Region: Wisconsin
- Discipline: Road
- Competition: National calendar
- Type: Stage race
- Organiser: Wisconsin Milk Marketing Board
- Race director: Bill Koch

History
- First edition: 2009
- Editions: 16 (as of 2025)
- First winner: Chad Hartley (USA)
- Most wins: Florenz Knauer (GER) (3 wins)
- Most recent: Ben Oliver (NZL)

History (women)
- First winner: Jessie MacLean (AUS)
- Most wins: Laura Van Gilder (USA) (3 wins)
- Most recent: Marlies Mejías (CUB)

The Tour of America's Dairyland is a multi-day cycling race held annually in Wisconsin since 2009.

== Winners ==
=== Men ===
Year	Winner	Second	Third
2009	Chad Hartley (USA)	Logan Garey (USA)	Adam Bergman (USA)
2010	James Stemper (USA)	Chad Hartley (USA)	Michael Northey (NZL)
2011	Serghei Țvetcov (MDA)	Chad Hartley (USA)	Euris Vidal (DOM)
2012	John Murphy (USA)	Alexey Shmidt (RUS)	James Stemper (USA)
2013	Jake Keough (USA)	Hilton Clarke (AUS)	Luke Keough (USA)
2014	Daniel Holloway (USA)	Owen Gillott (AUS)	Brandon Feehery (USA)
2015	Scott Sunderland (AUS)	Alexander Ray (NZL)	Aldo Ino Ilešič (SLO)
2016	Tyler Magner (USA)	Daniel Holloway (USA)	John Murphy (USA)
2017	Florenz Knauer (GER)	Ole Quast (GER)	Reece Robinson (AUS)
2018	Luke Mudgway (NZL)	Colin Strickland (USA)	César Serna (MEX)
2019	Matthew Rice (AUS)	César Marte (DOM)	Moritz Malcharek (GER)
2020	No race		
2021	Clever Martínez (VEN)	Ethan Craine (NZL)	César Marte (DOM)
2022	Florenz Knauer (GER)	Owen Gillott (AUS)	César Marte (DOM)
2023 - Colby	Jaime Castañeda (COL)	Florenz Knauer (GER)	César Marte (DOM)
2023 - Cheddar	Florenz Knauer (GER)	César Marte (DOM)	Ethan Craine (NZL)
2024	Lucas Bourgoyne (USA)	Clayton Travis (USA)	Ryan Jastrab (USA)
2025	Ben Oliver (NZL)	Lucas Bourgoyne (USA)	Brody McDonald (USA)

=== Women ===
Year	Winner	Second	Third
2009	Jessie MacLean (AUS)	Devon Haskell Gorry (USA)	Theresa Cliff-Ryan (USA)
2010	Sarah Caravella-Fader (USA)	Carrie Cash-Wooten (USA)	Francis Schofield (USA)
2011	Laura Van Gilder (USA)	Cari Higgins (USA)	Kristen Lasasso (USA)
2012	Laura Van Gilder (USA)	Emily Collins (NZL)	Erica Allar (USA)
2013	Laura Van Gilder (USA)	Kimberley Wells (AUS)	Jennifer Purcell (USA)
2014	Samantha Schneider (USA)	Erica Allar (USA)	Tina Pic (USA)
2015	Tina Pic (USA)	Lauretta Hanson (AUS)	Yusseli Mendivil (MEX)
2016	Peta Mullens (AUS)	Tina Pic (USA)	Kendall Hodges (AUS)
2017	Rebecca Wiasak (AUS)	Josie Talbot (AUS)	Peta Mullens (AUS)
2018	Rebecca Wiasak (AUS)	Sharlotte Lucas (NZL)	Katie Compton (USA)
2019	Harriet Owen (GBR)	Natalie Redmond (AUS)	Peta Mullens (AUS)
2020	No race		
2021	Matilda Raynolds (AUS)	Harriet Owen (GBR)	Alijah Beatty (USA)
2022	Harriet Owen (GBR)	Nicola Macdonald (AUS)	Sofía Arreola (MEX)
2023 - Colby	Harriet Owen (GBR)	Skylar Schneider (USA)	Holly Simonson (CAN)
2023 - Cheddar	Rylee McMullen (NZL)	Grace Arlandson (USA)	Anna Christian (GBR)
2024	Marlies Mejías (CUB)	Rylee McMullen (NZL)	Arielle Martin (USA)
2025	Marlies Mejías (CUB)	Odette Lynch (AUS)	Arielle Martin (USA)
