= Nicole Reinhart =

American cyclist (1976–2000)

Personal information
- Full name: Nicole Reinhart
- Born: June 3, 1976 Macungie, Pennsylvania, U.S.
- Died: September 17, 2000 (aged 24) Arlington, Massachusetts, U.S.

Cycling career
- Sport: Cycling
- Disciplines: Road & Track
- Role: Rider

Nicole Louise Reinhart (June 3, 1976 – September 17, 2000) was an American professional track and road racing cyclist who twice won gold medals in cycling at the Pan American Games.

== Early life and education ==
Reinhart grew up in Macungie, Pennsylvania in the Lehigh Valley region of the state. She was a nine-time USA Cycling Junior (18 and under) national champion. As a student at Emmaus High School in Emmaus, Pennsylvania, she won three U.S. fitness championships and excelled on Emmaus's cross-country and track teams in the highly competitive East Penn Conference.

== Pan American Games and other championships ==
After graduating from Emmaus High School in 1994, Reinhart focused on cycling and won two national élite track championships and two gold medals at the Pan American Games. In 1999, she signed for Saturn Women's Professional Cycling Team and won nine races that year, followed by another 13 in 2000.

== Death ==
On September 17, 2000, Reinhart was killed during a 42-mile circuit race held on a 3.5-mile course in Arlington, Massachusetts. Her left pedal and foot hit a concrete curb, and she was thrown from her bicycle and struck a tree. The accident that killed Wouter Weylandt in May 2011 happened in almost precisely the same manner. The event was the last of four races comprising the 2000 BMC Software Cycling Grand Prix. She had won the previous three; the organizers offered $250,000 to any rider who won all four. The prize was donated to her family, who established the Nicole Reinhart Foundation in Macungie, Pennsylvania in her honor. A park or playground at the Cutter School in Arlington, Massachusetts was named in her honor as a memorial, and dedicated in 2001.

In 2004, Reinhart was inducted posthumously into the Lehigh Valley Velodrome Hall of Fame in Breinigsville, Pennsylvania.

== Major cycling achievements ==
2000 – Saturn Women's Professional Cycling Team
1st Clarendon Cup

- 1st – BMC Software Tour of San Jose (San Jose, California)
- 1st – BMC Software Tour of Houston (Houston, Texas)
- 1st – BMC Software Downtown Criterium (Austin, Texas)
- 1st, Prologue – Redlands Bicycle Classic
- 3rd – Women's 25 km points race, U.S. Olympic Track Trials

1999 – Saturn Women's Professional Cycling Team
1st Clarendon Cup

- 1st, Stage 3 (25-mile criterium) – Redlands Bicycle Classic
- 3rd, Prologue – Redlands Bicycle Classic
- 10th – Sea Otter Classic - Final General Classification
  - 10th – Sea Otter Classic (Robert Talbott Pro/Elite Circuit Race)
  - 20th – Sea Otter Classic (Robert Talbott Pro/Elite Time Trial)
  - 38th – Sea Otter Classic (Robert Talbott Pro/Elite Road Stage Race)

1998

- 1st, Prologue – Redlands Bicycle Classic
- 1st, Women's 3 km Scratch Race – EDS Spring Classic
- 1st, Women's Miss and Out – EDS Spring Classic
- 3rd, Women's 500 m Sprint – UCI World Track Cup

1997

- 1st, Women's 500 m Sprint – EDS Track Cup
- 1st, Women's Points Race – EDS Track Cup
- Quarterfinals, Women's Match Sprint – UCI World Track Cup

1996

- 1st, Women's 500 m Sprint – Pan American Championships
- 1st, Road race – Pan American Championships

1994

- 17-18 2000m TT – United States Junior Women Track Champion
- 17-18 Criterium – United States Junior Women Road Champion

1993

- 17-18 Points Race – United States Junior Women Track Champion
- 17-18 Sprints – United States Junior Women Track Champion
- 17-18 Criterium – United States Junior Women Road Champion

1992

- 15-16 Omnium – United States Junior Women Track Champion
- 15-16 Criterium – United States Junior Women Road Champion
- 15-16 Road – United States Junior Women Road Champion

=== U.S. national records ===
- 11.666 seconds – Junior Women Track Time Trial Flying Start (200 m), Quito, Ecuador, July 26, 1994 (since broken).
