= Jake Keough =

American bicycle racer (born 1987)

Personal information
- Full name: Jacob Keough
- Born: June 18, 1987 (age 39) Sandwich, Massachusetts

Cycling career
- Sport: Cycling
- Current team: Retired
- Discipline: Road
- Role: Rider
- Rider type: Sprinter

Professional teams
- 2008–2009: Kelly Benefit Strategies–Medifast
- 2010–2013: Health Net–Maxxis
- 2014: 5-hour Energy

Jake Keough (born June 18, 1987) is an American former road cyclist, who competed as a professional from 2008 to 2014. A sprinter, he notably won stages of the Tour of Utah, Volta a Portugal and the Tour of Qinghai Lake in addition to multiple wins at national level criterium races. His brother Luke also competed as a professional cyclist.

== Major results ==
2008
1st Stage 8 International Cycling Classic
2nd Univest Grand Prix
3rd Harlem Skyscraper Classic
2009
1st Stages 1, 3 & 4 Vuelta Ciclista del Uruguay
2nd Tour of Somerville
3rd Criterium, National Road Championships
2010
1st US Air Force Cycling Classic
2011
1st Crystal City Classic
1st Historic Roswell Criterium
1st Wilmington Grand Prix
1st Stage 2 Nature Valley Grand Prix
3rd Criterium, National Road Championships
7th Univest Grand Prix
2012
1st Crystal Cup
1st Harlem Skyscraper Classic
1st Stage 4 Tour of Utah
2013
1st Overall Tour of America's Dairyland

1st Stages 1, 2, 3 & 4

1st Stage 13 Tour of Qinghai Lake
1st Stage 10 Volta a Portugal
