= Tour of the Bahamas =

Cycling race

Race details
- Date: January/March
- Region: The Bahamas
- Nickname: "The Tour"
- Discipline: Road
- Type: Stage race
- Organiser: JAR Cycling
- Race director: Jeff Major

History
- First edition: 2005
- Editions: 7
- First winner: Joe Fernandes (BAH)
- Most recent: Ty Magner (USA)

The Tour of the Bahamas is a road cycling race held in Nassau, the capital of The Bahamas. The Tour is a competition over three stages. On the first stage there is an individual time trial, a race against the clock, followed by a circuit race, the next day. Finally, a road race is held, this stage is the only stage that leaves Nassau City. Due to the Bahamas's warm climate, the race is used by many cyclists to kick off their racing seasons.

== Past winners ==
Year	Country	Rider	Team
2005	Bahamas	Joe Fernandes	
2006	United States	Ricardo Hernandez	Cafeteros
2007	Cuba	Frank Travieso	AEG Toshiba
2008	United States	Tyler Farrar	Slipstream–Chipotle
2009	No race		
2010	United States	Caleb Fairly	Garmin–Transitions
2011	United States	Chuck Hutcheson	Battley Harley Davidson
2012	United States	Ty Magner	BMC-Hincapie Sportswear
2013	No race		
