= Tina Pic =

American bicycle racer (born 1966)

Tina Mayolo Pic
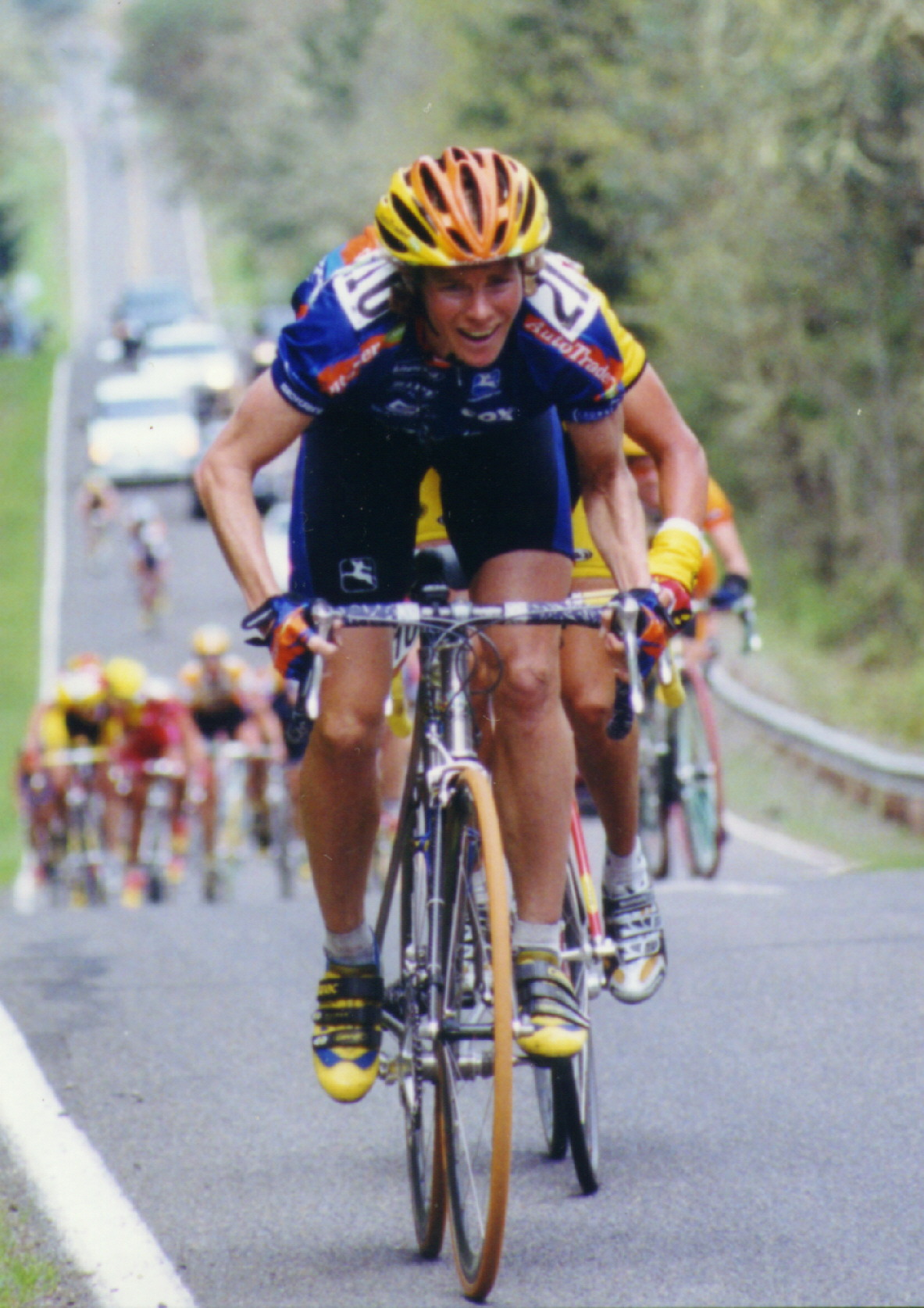
- Pic at the 2000 Tour of Willamette

Personal information
- Full name: Tina Pic
- Born: May 9, 1966 (age 60) Alexandria, Virginia

Cycling career
- Sport: Cycling
- Current team: Colavita–HelloFresh
- Discipline: Road
- Role: Rider; Directeur sportif
- Rider type: Sprinter

Amateur teams
- 2005: Quark Cycling Team
- 2006: Colavita Olive Oil–Sutter Home Wines
- 2008–2009: Colavita–Sutter Home
- 2012: Colavita–espnW (guest)
- 2013: Colavita–Fine Cooking
- 2014: Fearless Femme p/b Pure Energy
- 2014: DNA Cycling p/b K4 (guest)
- 2016: Happy Tooth Women's Racing
- 2017: Papa John's Racing p/b Trek
- 2018–: Colavita–Bialetti

Professional teams
- 2000–2001: AutoTrader.com
- 2002–2003: Diet Rite
- 2007: Colavita–Sutter Home
- 2008: Vrienden van het Platteland
- 2015: Pepper Palace p/b The Happy Tooth

Managerial teams
- 2010–2012: Colavita/Baci
- 2014: DNA Cycling p/b K4
Medal record
Women's road bicycle racing
Representing United States
Pan American Championships
Gold medal – first place	2005 Mar del Plata	Road race
Gold medal – first place	2007 Valencia	Road race

Tina Mayolo Pic (born May 9, 1966) is an American bicycle racer. She is a 6-time United States National Criterium Championships winner (2002–2005, 2007, 2009) and a 4-time USA Cycling National Racing Calendar points champion (2000, 2004–2006).

== Career ==
Pic graduated from the University of Virginia with degrees in Finance and Marketing. She subsequently enrolled in a pre-medical program at the University of Georgia, where she switched sports from triathlon and duathlon to cycling, winning the Collegiate National Championship in 1995 and turning professional the following year. Pic announced her retirement at the end of 2009 season, remaining with the Colavita team for 2010 as a director alongside team-mate Rachel Heal, replacing Iona Wynter. After the original Colavita team dissolved in October 2011, Pic joined the refounded Colavita-espnW team for 2012 as a director alongside Wynter. She subsequently made a comeback to racing for the team during the summer of 2012. For the 2014 season, she was the on-road directeur sportif of DNA Cycling p/b K4. In January 2015 she was announced by Pepper Palace p/b The Happy Tooth as part of their squad for the 2015 season.

== Major results ==
1998
Superweek

1st July 17
1st July 21
3rd July 23

1st Tour de Moore
3rd Tour of Somerville
3rd 89er Criterium
Tour LeFleur

3rd Road race
6th Criterium

5th Time trial, National Road Championships
5th Wilmington Classic
5th Athens Twilight Criterium
6th Overall Fitchburg Longsjo Classic
6th Graton Road Race, Wine Country Classic
7th Overall Enchanted Mountain Stage Race
9th Overall Sea Otter Classic
1999
4th Tour of Somerville
National Road Championships

5th Time trial
6th Criterium
7th Road race

5th Overall Tour of the Gila
5th Clarendon Cup
6th LeFleur Criterium
8th Athens Twilight Criterium
2000
1st Overall USA Cycling National Racing Calendar
1st NYC Women's Challenge
1st Tour of Somerville
2nd BMC Tour of San Jose
2nd BMC Software Criterium (Houston)
3rd Overall Parker Dam Road Race

1st La Paz County Park Criterium

Sequoia Cycling Classic

3rd Rocky Hill Road Race
4th Visalia Criterium

3rd Merced Downtown Criterium, McLane-Pacific Bicycle Classic
National Road Championships

4th Criterium
6th Time trial
8th Road race

4th Overall International Tour de Toona
4th Overall Tour of Willamette
4th Overall Sea Otter Classic
5th Chris Thater Memorial Criterium
5th Capitol Cup Criterium
7th Liberty Classic
7th Clarendon Cup
10th Overall Tour of the Gila

1st Stage 4 (Silver City Criterium)

2001
1st Manhattan Beach Grand Prix
2nd Overall Wendy's International Cycling Classic
2nd Overall Valley of the Sun Stage Race

1st Stage 3 (Mercury Criterium)

2nd Chris Thater Memorial Criterium
2nd Tour of Somerville
National Road Championships

4th Criterium
7th Time trial
9th Road race

4th Xcelerate Twilight Criterium
5th Capital Cup
Sequoia Cycling Classic

5th Rocky Hill Road Race
8th Visalia Criterium

7th Timex International Women's Open
8th San Rafael Cycling Classic
8th BMC Software Criterium (Austin)
2002
National Road Championships

1st Criterium
3rd Road race
3rd Time trial

8th Liberty Classic
2003
1st National Criterium Championships
1st Housatonic Classic Criterium
9th Liberty Classic
2004
National Road Championships

1st Criterium
3rd Road race

1st Overall USA Cycling National Racing Calendar
McLane Pacific Classic

1st Road race
1st Criterium

2nd San Fran T-Mobile International
4th Overall Sea Otter Classic
5th Overall Tour du Grand Montréal

1st Stage 1 (ITT)

8th Overall Redlands Bicycle Classic

1st Stage 4

2005
1st Road race, Pan American Road Championships
National Road Championships

1st Criterium
3rd Road race

1st Overall USA Cycling National Racing Calendar
1st Stage 7 International Tour de Toona
1st Stage 1 Women's Tour of New Zealand
6th Overall Redlands Bicycle Classic
2006
1st Overall USA Cycling National Racing Calendar
1st Clarendon Cup
1st Garret Lemire Criterium
1st Sunny King Criterium
1st Bikejam
1st Tour of Somerville
1st CapTech Classic
1st Presbyterian Hospital Invitational Criterium
1st Stage 2 Redlands Bicycle Classic
3rd Overall International Tour de Toona
3rd Liberty Classic
4th Australia World Cup
2007
1st Road race, Pan American Road and Track Championships
1st National Criterium Championships
1st U.S. Open Cycling Championships
1st Tour de Leelanau
1st Presbyterian Hospital Invitational Criterium
Central Valley Classic

1st Criterium
1st Road race

1st Richmond Cycling Classic
1st Overall United States Criterium Southeast Series

1st Roswell Race
1st Walterboro Race
1st Greenwood

1st Hanes Park Criterium
7th Overall Tour of Geelong

1st Stage 4

9th Liberty Classic
2008
1st Overall USA Cycling National Racing Calendar
1st Overall US SpeedWeek Criterium Series
1st Beaufort Memorial Cycling Classic
1st Uptown Greenwood Pro Cycling Challenge
1st Steadman Hawkins Cycling Classic
1st Sunny King Criterium
1st Historic Nalley Roswell Criterium
1st Sandy Springs Cycling Challenge
1st Tour of Somerville
Fitchburg Longsjo Classic

1st Criterium
3rd Road race

1st Chris Thater Memorial
1st Priority Health Grand Cycling Classic
1st Stage 1 Mt. Hood Cycling Classic
1st Stage 2 Nature Valley Grand Prix
2nd Road race, National Road Championships
2nd AT&T Austin Downtown Criterium
2nd Hanes Park Classic
3rd Presbyterian Hospital Invitational Criterium
6th Liberty Classic
9th Road race, Pan American Road and Track Championships
2009
1st National Criterium Championships
1st Tour of Somerville
1st Marion Classic
2nd Sunny King Criterium
2nd RFK Criterium
2nd Presbyterian Hospital Invitational Criterium
3rd Chris Thater Memorial
5th San Jose Cycling Classic
5th Hanes Park Classic
2012
4th Exergy Twilight Criterium
2013
5th Sunny King Criterium
6th Delray Beach Criterium
2014
1st Overall Armed Forces Association Cycling Classic

1st Stages 1 & 2

1st Athens Twilight Criterium
1st Historic Roswell Criterium
1st Downtown Walterboro Criterium
1st Wilmington Grand Prix
2nd Manhattan Beach Grand Prix
4th Gaffney Criterium
5th Tour of Somerville
6th Charlotte-Belmont Omnium
7th Andersen Banducci Twilight Criterium
8th Spartanburg Regional Classic
2015
1st Overall Tour of America's Dairyland

1st Stages 1, 3, 4, 7 & 8

1st Athens Twilight Criterium
1st Wilmington Grand Prix
2nd National Criterium Championships
2016
7th White Spot / Delta Road Race
