= Gavin Mannion =

American bicycle racer (born 1991)

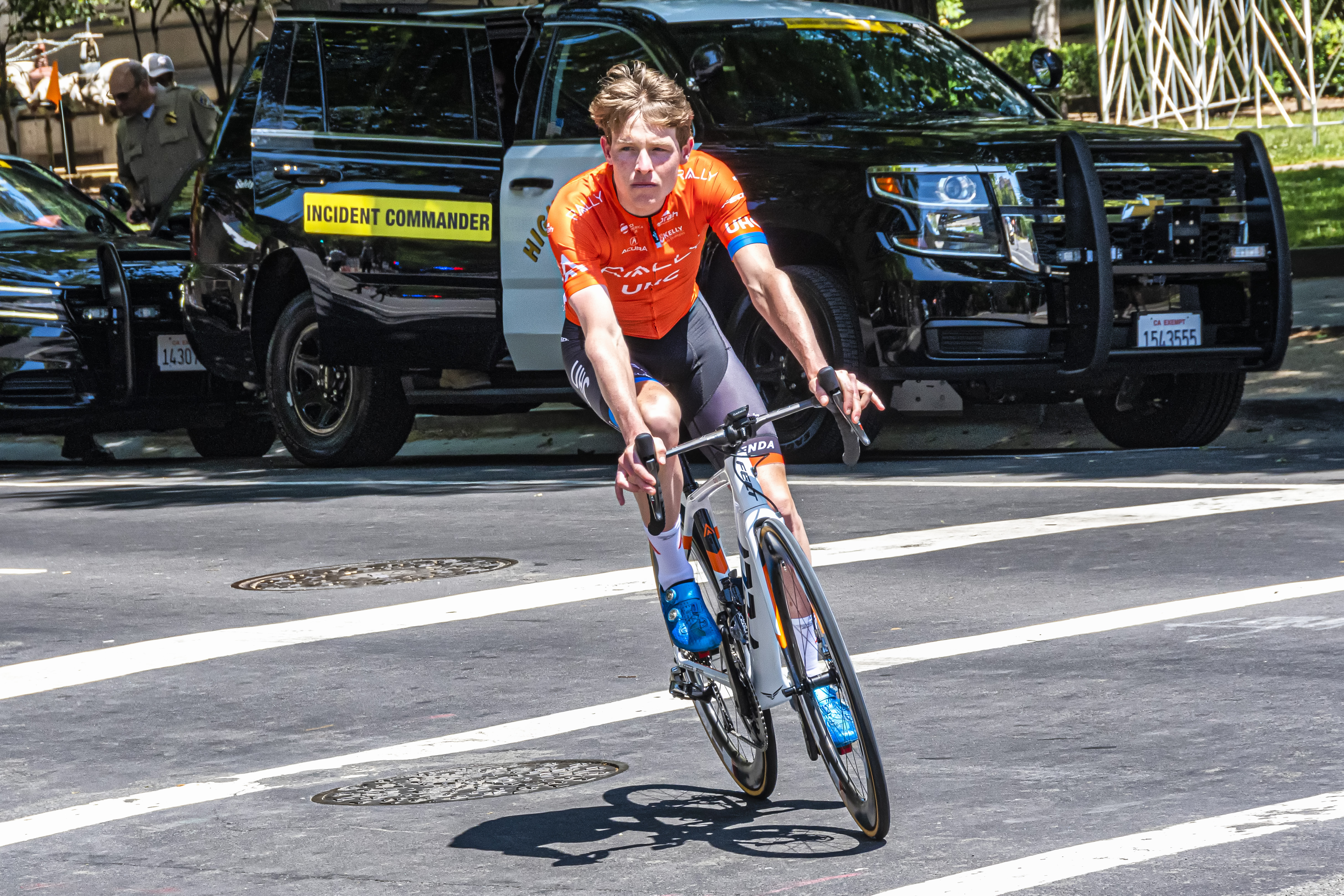

Personal information
- Born: August 24, 1991 (age 35) Dedham, Massachusetts, United States
- Height: 1.71 m (5 ft 7 in)
- Weight: 58 kg (128 lb)

Cycling career
- Sport: Cycling
- Current team: Retired
- Discipline: Road
- Role: Rider

Professional teams
- 2011–2013: Trek–Livestrong
- 2014: 5-hour Energy
- 2014: Garmin–Sharp (stagiaire)
- 2015: Jelly Belly–Maxxis
- 2016: Drapac Professional Cycling
- 2017–2018: UnitedHealthcare
- 2019–2022: Rally UHC Cycling

Major wins
- Stage races Colorado Classic (2018)

Gavin Mannion (born August 24, 1991) is an American former cyclist, who competed as a professional from 2011 to 2022.

== Major results ==
2009
3rd Bermuda GP
2011
6th La Côte Picarde
2012
1st Stage 1 Tour of New Baunfels
3rd Road race, National Under-23 Road Championships
2013
6th Overall Tour of the Gila
8th Overall Tour de l'Avenir
2015
2nd Overall Redlands Bicycle Classic
3rd Overall Tour of the Gila
3rd Overall Cascade Cycling Classic
4th Overall USA Pro Cycling Challenge
2016
7th Overall Tour de Korea
2017
2nd Overall Tour of Utah
2nd Overall Cascade Cycling Classic
3rd Overall Joe Martin Stage Race
4th Overall Tour of the Gila
2018
1st Overall Colorado Classic

1st Stage 2 (ITT)

2nd Overall Tour of the Gila

1st Stage 5

4th Road race, National Road Championships
2019
8th Overall GP Beiras e Serra da Estrela
2020
5th Overall Tour de Savoie Mont-Blanc

1st Stages 4 & 5 (ITT)

8th Overall Troféu Joaquim Agostinho
9th Overall Vuelta a San Juan
10th Overall Settimana Internazionale di Coppi e Bartali
2021
6th Trofeo Andratx – Mirador d'Es Colomer
