= Brooke Miller (cyclist) =

American racing cyclist

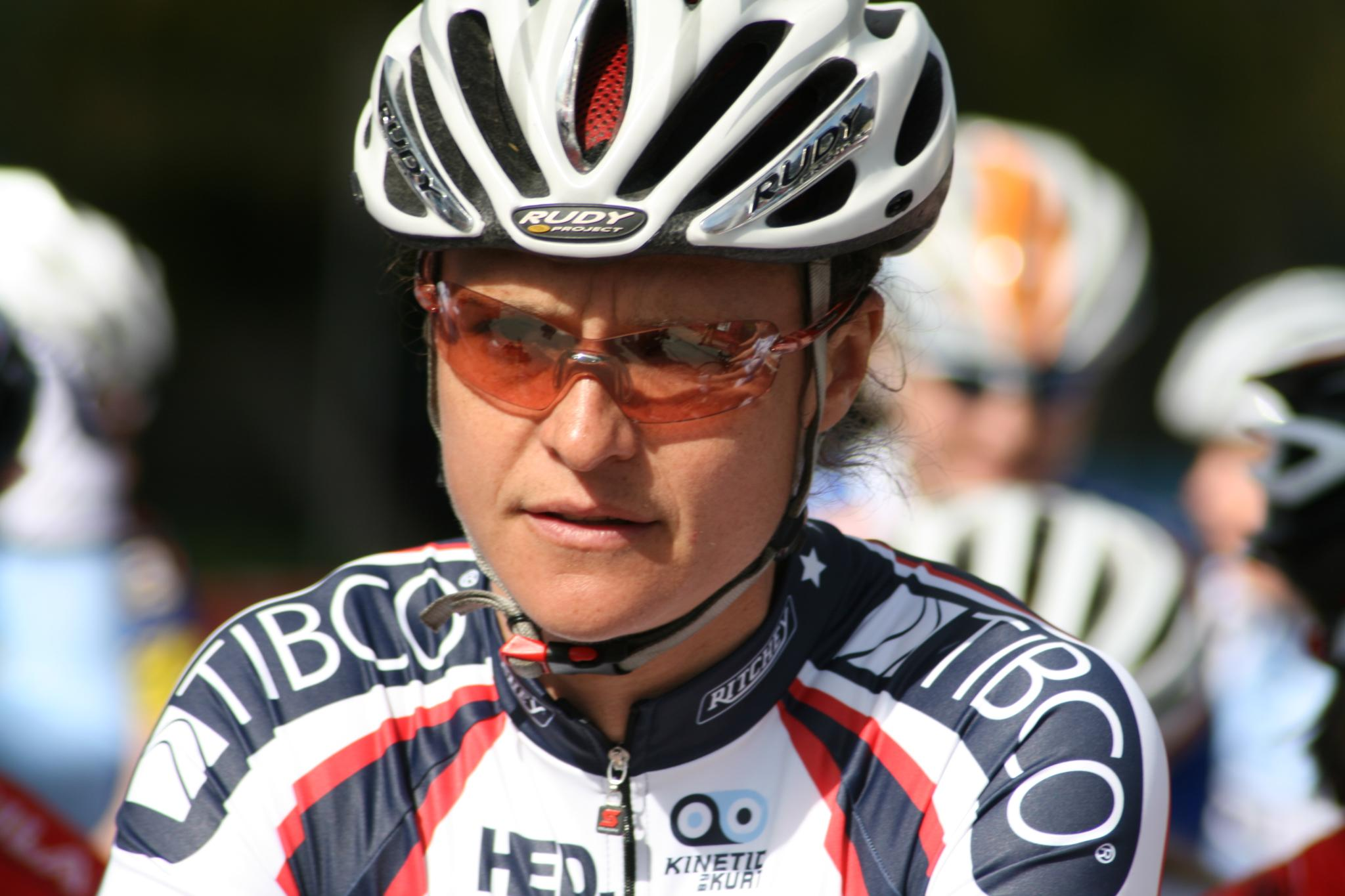
- Miller in 2009

Personal information
- Full name: Brooke Miller
- Born: March 21, 1976 (age 50) Huntington Beach, California, U.S.
- Height: 1.78 m (5 ft 10 in)

Cycling career
- Sport: Cycling
- Discipline: Road
- Role: Rider
- Rider type: Sprinter

Professional teams
- 2003–2005: UCSC Cycling
- 2005: Squadra Torani
- 2006: PABW Powered by TIBCO
- 2007–2010: Team TIBCO

Major wins
- (United States) Multiple National Champion

Brooke Miller (born March 21, 1976) is an American former professional road racing cyclist and U.S. national team member. In 2008, she won both the women's criterium and road race national championships.

== Biography ==
Brooke Miller was born in Huntington Beach, California. She did not start to cycle until she was in graduate school, having been an elite volleyball player at the University of California at Berkeley. It was not until Miller was invited to attend the USA Cycling Women’s Talent ID camp in 2005, that she learned that women peak older than men, and she then started to take cycling seriously.

Miller became a member of the US National Team in 2007, and competed in Europe, coming second in the first stage and winning the third stage of the Tour de l'Ardèche in France. She also came third in the third stage of the Holland Ladies Tour in Denekamp.

She graduated with a PhD in Evolutionary Biology from the University of California, Santa Cruz in spring 2007, and began racing full-time in 2008, although she does work as a software developer in her spare time.

Following her successful racing season in 2007, Miller continued to ride for Team TIBCO in 2008, and is also the team's Marketing Director, managing "sponsor relations and strategic development, establishing and strengthening growth-oriented industry partnerships."

She is the 2008 United States National Road Race and Criterium Champion. Miller won the first women's criterium to be held alongside the men's Tour of California, the race was sponsored by the Redwood Regional Breast Center. She also competed in the Tour de l'Aude and the Tour of New Zealand.

Miller's ultimate goal was an Olympic gold medal, she had dreamed of this since she was a child. She began chasing her dream in volleyball before switching to cycling. However, she retired from the sport in August 2010 following the Chris Thater Memorial Classic, the official end of the women's NRC calendar. Miller cited difficulty living away from home in Europe and not wanting to make the sacrifices necessary to secure her spot on the 2012 Olympic team as the main reasons behind her retirement.

== Major results ==
2006
1st Stage 2, Nature Valley Grand Prix, Cannon Falls
1st Stage 5, Tour de Toona, Martinsburg

2007
1st Martinez
1st Santa Clarita
2nd Stage 1, Central Valley Classic
2nd Indio Grand Prix
1st Stage 2, Nature Valley Grand Prix, Cannon Falls
3rd Stage 4, Nature Valley Grand Prix, Minneapolis
3rd Stage 6, Holland Ladies Tour, Denekamp (NED)
2nd Stage 1, Tour de l'Ardèche (FRA)
1st Stage 3, Tour de l'Ardèche, Cruas (FRA)

2008
1st United States National Road Race Championships
1st United States National Criterium Championships
1st Tour of California Women's Criterium, Santa Rosa
2nd Central Valley Classic, Fresno
2nd Stage 5, Le Tour du Grand Montréal, Mont-Saint-Hilaire (CAN)
2nd Liberty Classic
3rd Stage 1, Nature Valley Grand Prix, St. Paul Lowertown
1st Stage 4, Nature Valley Grand Prix, Minneapolis
1st Manhattan Beach GP
1st Davis
3rd Stage 2, Cascade Classic, Three Creeks Snow Park
1st Stage 4, Cascade Classic, Oregon
3rd Chicago
2nd Bank of America Invitational
1st Hanes Park Classic

2010
1st Clarendon Cup
