= United States National Criterium Championships =

The United States National Criterium Championships are held annually and run by the national governing body, USA Cycling.

The event has formerly been held at venues including Denver, Colorado, Downers Grove, Illinois, and Glencoe, Illinois. The 2015 edition of the race will be hosted by the city of Chattanooga, Tennessee. Formerly, the event allowed an international field, so the first rider from the United States who crossed the finish line was crowned the "United States National Criterium Champion" gaining the right to wear the national champion's jersey in subsequent criteriums for the following year. As domestic participation has grown in more recent years, the event has been limited to United States citizens so that the winner of the race will also be crowned the national champion.

== Results ==
=== Men ===
Year	Gold	Silver	Bronze
1980	David Ware	Dale Stetina	Davis Phinney
1981	Tom Schuler	Dale Stetina	Davis Phinney
1982	John Eustice	Davis Phinney	
1983	John Eustice	Leonard Nitz	
1988	John Tomac	Mike McCarthy	
1990	Jim Copeland	Taylor Centauri	
1991	Greg Oravetz		
1992	Mike McCarthy		
1993	Mike Engelman		
1994	Dave McCook		
1995	Frank McCormack		
1996	Frank McCormack		
1997	Jonas Carney		
1998	Chann McRae		
1999	Antonio Cruz		
2000	Derek Bouchard-Hall		
2001	Kirk O'Bee		
2002	Kevin Monahan		
2003	Kevin Monahan		
2004	Jonas Carney		
2005	Tyler Farrar		
2006	Brad Huff		
2007	Shawn Milne	Alex Candelario	Tony Cruz
2008	Rahsaan Bahati	Alex Candelario	Mark Hekman
2009	John Murphy	Tony Cruz	Jake Keough
2010	Daniel Holloway	Ken Hanson	Alex Candelario
2011	Eric Young	Brad Huff	Jake Keough
2012	Ken Hanson	Brad Huff	Bradley White
2013	Eric Young	Ken Hanson	Jake Keough
2014	John Murphy	Brad White	Daniel Holloway
2015	Eric Marcotte	Tyler Magner	Luke Keough
2016	Brad Huff	John Murphy	Luke Keough
2017	Travis McCabe	Eric Young	Tyler Magner
2018	Tyler Magner	Eric Young	Samuel Bassetti
2019	Travis McCabe	Eric Young	Miguel Bryon
2020	Not held due to the COVID-19 pandemic		
2021	Luke Lamperti	Samuel Bassetti	Eric Young
2022	Luke Lamperti	Gavin Hoover	Scott McGill
2023	Luke Lamperti	Colby Simmons	Tyler Williams
2024	Stephen Bassett	Brendan Rhim	Scott McGill
2025	Lucas Bourgoyne	Scott McGill	Colby Simmons

=== Women ===
Year	Gold	Silver	Bronze
1980	Pam Deem	Betsy Davis	Jolanta Goral
1981	Connie Paraskevin	Sheila Young-Ochowicz	Leslie Moore-Nitz
2002	Tina Pic		
2003	Tina Pic		
2004	Tina Pic		
2005	Tina Pic		
2006	Jennifer McRae		
2007	Tina Pic	Jennifer McRae	Anna Lang
2008	Brooke Miller	Theresa Cliff-Ryan	Jennifer MacRae-Evans
2009	Tina Pic	Brooke Miller	Shelley Olds
2010	Shelley Olds	Erica Allar	Lauren Tamayo
2011	Theresa Cliff-Ryan	Laura Van Gilder	Kelly Benjamin
2012	Theresa Cliff-Ryan	Lauren Hall	Carmen Small
2013	Alison Powers	Amanda Miller	Theresa Cliff-Ryan
2014	Coryn Rivera	Erica Allar	Samantha Schneider
2015	Kendall Ryan	Tina Pic	Brianna Walle
2016	Lauren Tamayo	Elle Anderson	Sara Tussey
2017	Erica Allar	Lauren Stephens	Irena Ossola
2018	Leigh Ann Ganzar	Kelly Catlin	Jennifer Luebke
2019	Emma White	Lily Williams	Kendall Ryan
2020	Not held due to the COVID-19 pandemic		
2021	Kendall Ryan	Megan Jastrab	Coryn Rivera
2022	Kendall Ryan	Skyler Schneider	Alexis Ryan
2023	Coryn Labecki	Kendall Ryan	Chloe Patrick
2024	Coryn Labecki	Elizabeth Dixon	Kendall Ryan
2025	Kendall Ryan	Alexis Magner	Chloe Patrick

== See also ==
- United States National Road Race Championships
- United States National Time Trial Championships
