= Kyle Wamsley =

American cyclist

Personal information
- Born: March 1, 1980 (age 46) Hatfield, California–Oregon, U.S.

Cycling career
- Sport: Cycling
- Current team: Retired
- Discipline: Road
- Role: Rider

Amateur team
- 2015: Team Skyline

Professional teams
- 2003–2004: Team Fuji Bikes
- 2005: Team Snow Valley p/b Seal-On
- 2006: Colavita–Sutter Home
- 2007: Navigators Insurance
- 2008–2009: Colavita–Sutter Home
- 2010–2011: Bissell
- 2012–2013: Jamis–Sutter Home

Kyle Wamsley (born March 1, 1980) is an American former professional road cyclist.

== Major results ==
2004
1st Stage 6 Vuelta a Cuba
2005
1st Tour of Somerville
2nd Rochester Twilight Criterium
3rd Criterium, National Road Championships
2006
1st Stage 7 Tour de Toona
2nd Tour of Somerville
2007
3rd Rochester Twilight Criterium
2008
1st Overall Fitchburg Longsjo Classic

1st Stage 3

2nd US Air Force Cycling Classic
3rd Overall Tour de Toona
2009
1st Stage 3 Redlands Bicycle Classic
2011
5th Road race, National Road Championships
