= Eric Marcotte =

American racing cyclist (born 1980)

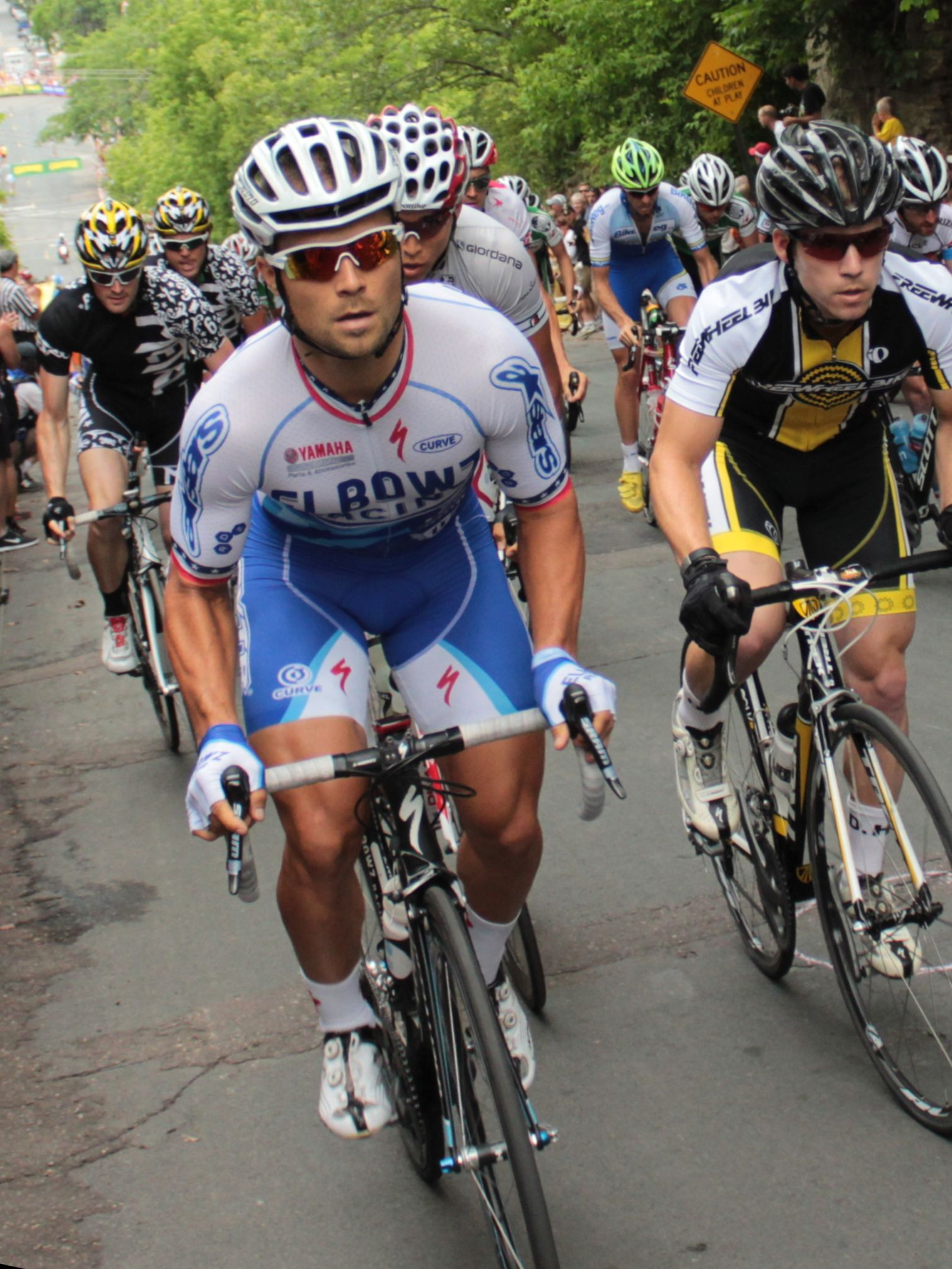
- Marcotte at the 2012 Nature Valley Grand Prix

Personal information
- Full name: Eric D. Marcotte
- Nickname: Dr. Eric
- Born: February 8, 1980 (age 46) Marquette, Michigan

Cycling career
- Sport: Cycling
- Discipline: Road
- Role: Rider

Amateur teams
- 2006–2008: Bianchi Grand Performance
- 2009: Bicycle Haus
- 2010–2011: Sklz p/b Pista Palace
- 2012–2013: ELBOWZ RACING

Professional teams
- 2013–2015: Team SmartStop-Mountain Khakis
- 2016: Team Jamis
- 2017: Cylance Pro Cycling
- 2018: UnitedHealthcare

Major wins
- National Road Race Championships (2014) National Criterium Championships (2015)

Eric D. Marcotte (born August 2, 1980) is an American former professional racing cyclist, who last rode for UCI Professional Continental team UnitedHealthcare. In 2014 he won the United States National Road Race Championships. He is originally from Marquette, Michigan. He lives and works as a chiropractor in Scottsdale, Arizona. In October 2015 Team Jamis announced that Marcotte would join them for the 2016 season.

== Major results ==
2010
1st Overall El Tour de Tucson 109-mile
1st Stage 2 Valley of the Sun Stage Race
2011
1st Overall El Tour de Tucson 111-mile
1st Stage 3 Valley of the Sun Stage Race
2012
1st Overall El Tour de Tucson 111-mile
2nd Overall Valley of the Sun Stage Race

1st Stage 2

1st Stage 3 Joe Martin Stage Race
1st Stage 3 Tulsa Tough
2013
3rd Overall Nature Valley Grand Prix
2014
1st Road race, National Road Championships
1st Stage 1 Vuelta a la Independencia Nacional
6th Overall Grand Prix Cycliste de Saguenay
8th Bucks County Classic
10th Winston-Salem Cycling Classic
2015
1st Criterium, National Road Championships
2nd Road Race, Pan American Games
2016
1st Stage 4 Tour of the Gila
2nd Winston Salem Cycling Classic
2nd The Reading 120
8th Philadelphia International Cycling Classic
