= Erica Carney =

American cyclist (born 1985)

Personal information
- Full name: Erica Carney
- Born: Erica Allar; November 5, 1985 (age 40) Illinois, U.S.

Cycling career
- Sport: Cycling
- Current team: Retired
- Disciplines: Road; Track
- Role: Rider
- Rider type: Sprinter

Amateur teams
- 2010: Vera Bradley Foundation
- 2012: RideClean/PatentIt.com
- 2013: Care4Cycling p/b Solomon

Professional teams
- 2009: Colavita–Sutter Home
- 2014–2015: Colavita–Fine Cooking
- 2016–2019: Rally Cycling

Erica Carney (née Allar; born November 5, 1985) is an American former professional racing cyclist, who rode professionally in 2009 and between 2014 and 2019 for the Colavita–Fine Cooking and Rally UHC Cycling teams.

== Formative years ==
Born as Erica Allar in Illinois on November 5, 1985, Erica Carney graduated from Northwestern Lehigh High School in the Northwestern Lehigh School District. She began her amateur cycling career at the age of fifteen at the Lehigh Valley Velodrome (now the Valley Preferred Cycling Center) and rode professionally for the first time in 2008 as a member of Aaron's Cycling Team.

== Career ==
During the mid-2000s, Carney rode in fifty to seventy cycling events per year. In 2006 and 2007, she won the National Criterium Championship (Under 23 category); in 2008, she finished tenth in the Commerce Bank Liberty Classic.

== Major results ==
2007
2nd Keirin, Australian National Track Championships
2008
10th Liberty Classic
2009
1st Clarendon Cup
2010
2nd Criterium, National Road Championships
2012
1st Sunny King Criterium
1st TD Bank Mayor's Cup
3rd Overall Tour of America's Dairyland
2013
1st TD Bank Mayor's Cup
2nd Sunny King Criterium
2014
1st Tour of Somerville
2nd Criterium, National Road Championships
2nd Overall Tour of America's Dairyland
2nd Sunny King Criterium
4th Winston-Salem Cycling Classic
2015
1st Overall Tulsa Tough

1st Stages 1 & 3

3rd Sunny King Criterium
2017
1st Criterium, National Road Championships
2nd Sunny King Criterium
2018
2nd Athens Twilight Criterium

== See also ==
- List of 2016 UCI Women's Teams and riders
