= Tour of Elk Grove =

Race details
- Date: August (Annually)
- Region: Elk Grove Village, IL United States
- Discipline: Road
- Competition: UCI America Tour 2.1
- Type: Stage race
- Organiser: Special Events Management
- Race director: Craig Johnson
- Web site: www.tourofelkgrove.com

History
- First edition: 2006
- Editions: 8 (2013)
- Most recent: Elia Viviani (ITA)

The Tour of Elk Grove was an annual bicycle race held in Elk Grove Village, Illinois, in the United States. First staged in 2006, the race covered more than 277 kilometers (172 Miles) and took place over three days. The event featured 16 professional and amateur races along with performances by local bands following the races.

== History ==
Established in 2006 as only a two-stage race, The Tour of Elk Grove was created to celebrate the 50th Anniversary of the creation of Elk Grove Village, IL. The race then became an annual event and being added to the USA Cycling National Racing Calendar. In 2012 the race was designated a 2.1 rating by the Union Cycliste Internationale for the race in August, 2012. The event also included a Pro Women Multi-Stage Race and several local charitable races.

In 2013, Mayor Craig Johnson announced the race will cease operations due to a scheduling conflict with USA Cycling and the Union Cycliste Internationale. "It's not going to deter what we want to do," said David Simmons, president of Friends of Cycling in Elk Grove. "As much as we enjoyed the weekend and the way it helped us raise the knowledge of cycling and advocacy, we're not going to stop working toward our goal, which is to get people out riding their bikes."

== Past winners ==
Men

| Year | Country | Rider | Team |
|---|---|---|---|
| 2006 | Australia | Hilton Clarke | Navigators Cycling Team |
| 2007 | Australia | Nathan O'Neill | Health Net-Maxxis |
| 2008 | Canada | David Veilleux | Kelly Benefit Strategies |
| 2009 | Australia | Karl Menzies | OUCH-Maxxis |
| 2010 | Australia | Jonathan Cantwell | Fly V Australia |
| 2011 | Cuba | Luis Amarán | Jamis-Sutter Home |
| 2012 | Canada | François Parisien | SpiderTech–C10 |
| 2013 | Italy | Elia Viviani | Cannondale |

Women

| Year | Country | Rider | Team |
|---|---|---|---|
| 2011 | Canada | Leah Kirchmann | Colavita Forno d' Asolo |
| 2012 | United States | Jade Wilcoxson | Optum p/b Kelly Benefit |
| 2013 | United States | Shelley Olds | Team TIBCO |
