= John Murphy (cyclist) =

American road cyclist (born 1984)

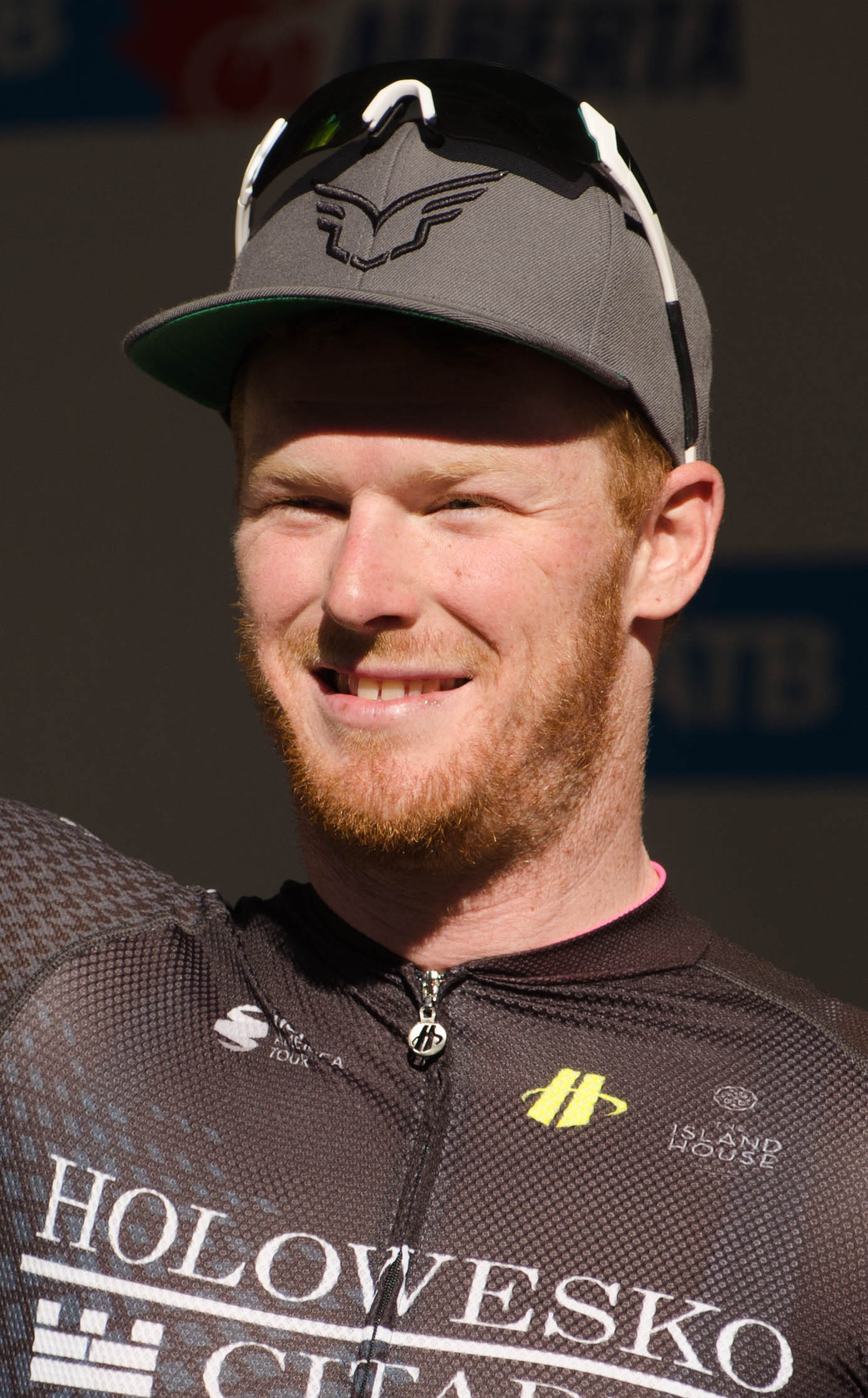
- Murphy at the 2017 Tour of Alberta

Personal information
- Born: December 15, 1984 (age 41) Jacksonville, Florida, United States
- Height: 1.85 m (6 ft 1 in)
- Weight: 81 kg (179 lb)

Cycling career
- Sport: Cycling
- Current team: Retired
- Discipline: Road
- Role: Sprinter

Amateur team
- 2004: Jittery Joe's

Professional teams
- 2006–2009: Health Net–Maxxis
- 2010–2011: BMC Racing Team
- 2012: Kenda–5-hour Energy
- 2013–2016: UnitedHealthcare
- 2017–2018: Holowesko Citadel Racing Team
- 2019–2020: Rally UHC Cycling

John Murphy (born December 15, 1984) is an American former professional cyclist, who competed between 2004 and 2020, for six different teams.

== Career ==
In 2010 he competed at (amongst others) the Gent–Wevelgem and the 93rd Giro d'Italia. In 2009 he became the United States National Criterium Champion. In 2012, Murphy signed a contract with the Kenda–5-hour Energy team.

Following the 2016 season, it was announced that Murphy would join fellow UnitedHealthcare member Tyler Magner at Holowesko Citadel Racing Team for the 2017 season.

After retiring from professional cycling in 2020 John joined Gulo Composites as their Brand Manager.

== Major results ==
2008
1st Overall Tour de Taiwan

1st Points classification

1st Stage 4 Fitchburg Longsjo Classic
2nd Overall Nature Valley Grand Prix
2009
1st National Criterium Championships
2010
6th Nokere Koerse
2011
6th Omloop van het Houtland
6th ProRace Berlin
2012
2nd Overall Tour of Elk Grove
5th Philadelphia International Championship
10th Tour of the Battenkill
2013
3rd Overall Tour of Elk Grove
2014
1st Mountains classification Danmark Rundt
2015
1st Overall Joe Martin Stage Race

1st Points classification
1st Stages 2 & 3

1st Stage 7 USA Pro Cycling Challenge
2016
1st Stage 3 Tour de Langkawi
1st Stage 4 Herald Sun Tour
9th Overall Joe Martin Stage Race
2017
1st White Spot / Delta Road Race
1st Stage 1 Colorado Classic
1st Stage 4 Tour of Utah
2018
1st Stage 1 Circuit des Ardennes
9th Overall Tour de Normandie
