= Tyler Magner =

American bicycle racer (born 1991)

Personal information
- Full name: Tyler Magner
- Nickname: Ty
- Born: May 3, 1991 (age 35) Griffin, Georgia

Cycling career
- Sport: Cycling
- Current team: L39ION of Los Angeles
- Discipline: Road
- Role: Rider

Amateur teams
- 2008–2009: Florida Velo Development
- 2010: Locos Grill & Pub
- 2010: Mountain Khakis–Jittery Joe’s (stagiaire)
- 2011: Type 1 Development

Professional teams
- 2011: Team Type 1–Sanofi (stagiaire)
- 2012–2015: BMC–Hincapie Sportswear Team
- 2016: UnitedHealthcare
- 2017: Holowesko Citadel Racing Team
- 2018–2020: Rally Cycling
- 2021–: L39ION of Los Angeles

Tyler Magner (born May 3, 1991) is an American cyclist, who currently rides for UCI Continental team L39ION of Los Angeles. He is married to fellow racing cyclist Alexis Magner.

== Major results ==
2009
9th Overall Tour de l'Abitibi
2012
1st Overall Tour of the Bahamas

1st Stage 1 (ITT)

1st Hanes Park Classic
1st Stage 6 Tour of China I
2013
1st Stage 4 Cascade Cycling Classic
National Under-23 Road Championships

2nd Time trial
3rd Road race

6th Bucks County Classic
9th Overall Paris–Arras Tour
9th ZLM Tour
2014
1st Stage 3 Sea Otter Classic
5th Winston-Salem Cycling Classic
9th Road race, Pan American Road Championships
2015
1st Sunny King Criterium
2nd National Criterium Championships
2nd Dana Point Grand Prix
5th Winston-Salem Cycling Classic
8th Overall Joe Martin Stage Race
2016
1st Clarendon Cup
2017
1st Stage 1 Tour of Utah
7th Winston-Salem Cycling Classic
2018
10th Winston-Salem Cycling Classic
2019
1st Stage 1 Tour de Beauce
4th Road race, National Road Championships
2022
1st Saint Francis Tulsa Tough
1st Bailey & Glasser Twilight Criterium
1st Salt Lake Criterium
1st Lake Bluff Criterium
3rd Sunny King Criterium
3rd Littleton Twilight Criterium
