= Alexis Magner =

American racing cyclist

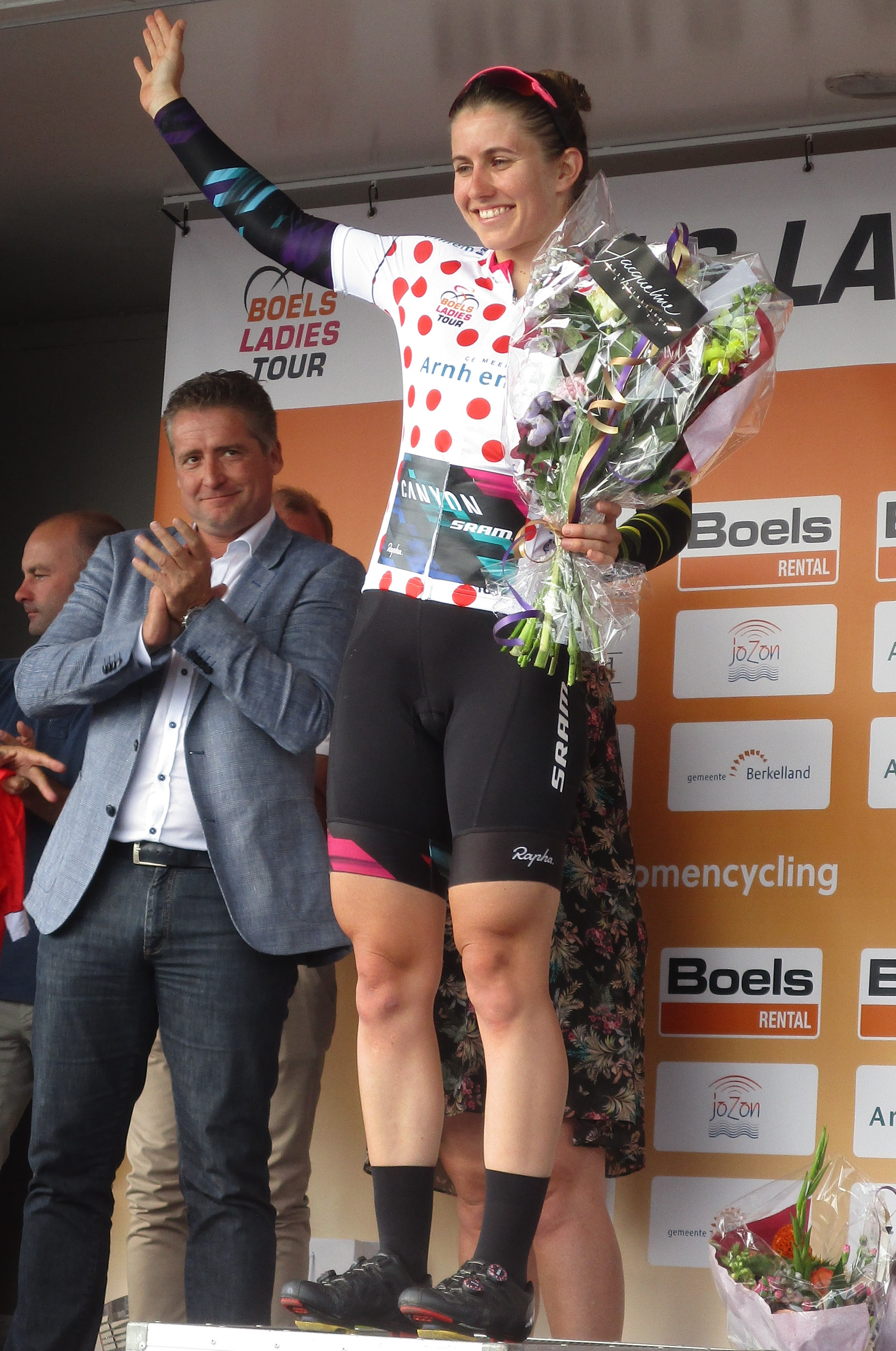
- Ryan at the 2017 Holland Ladies Tour

Personal information
- Full name: Alexis Magner
- Born: Alexis Ryan; August 18, 1994 (age 32) United States of America

Cycling career
- Sport: Cycling
- Current team: L39ION of Los Angeles
- Discipline: Road
- Role: Rider
- Rider type: All-rounder

Amateur teams
- 2013: NOW & Novartis for MS
- 2022–: L39ION of Los Angeles

Professional teams
- 2012: Team TIBCO–To The Top
- 2014–2015: UnitedHealthcare
- 2016–2021: Canyon//SRAM

Alexis Magner (née Ryan; born August 18, 1994) is an American racing cyclist, who rides for American amateur team L39ION of Los Angeles. She is the sister of fellow racing cyclist Kendall Ryan.

In November 2015 she was announced as part of the Canyon//SRAM team's inaugural squad for the 2016 season. She remained with the team for six years. She is married to fellow racing cyclist Tyler Magner.

== Major results ==
2007
1st Cross-country, National Junior Mountain Bike Championships
2008
1st Junior race, National Cyclo-cross Championships
2010
1st Junior race, National Cyclo-cross Championships
2nd Road race, National Junior Road Championships
2011
National Junior Road Championships

1st Road Race
1st Criterium

2012
National Junior Road Championships

1st Road Race
1st Criterium

1st Team pursuit, National Junior Track Championships
5th Glencoe Grand Prix
8th Lake Bluff Twilight Criterium
2013
National Under-23 Road Championships

1st Criterium
2nd Road race

Winston-Salem Cycling Classic

3rd Road race
3rd Criterium

2015
1st Fort McClellan Road Race
3rd Littleton Criterium
6th Criterium, National Road Championships
8th Overall The Women's Tour
2016
4th Open de Suède Vårgårda TTT
9th Road race, National Road Championships
2017
Holland Ladies Tour

1st Mountains classification
1st Combativity classification, Stage 5

3rd Open de Suède Vårgårda TTT
5th Overall Women's Tour Down Under

1st Young rider classification

10th Overall Ladies Tour of Norway
2018
1st Acht van Westerveld
1st Stage 1 Tour Cycliste Féminin International de l'Ardèche
2nd Omloop Het Nieuwsblad
2nd Ronde van Drenthe
3rd Overall Festival Elsy Jacobs
5th Amstel Gold Race
2019
1st Stage 1 (TTT) Giro Rosa
4th Acht van Westerveld
5th Road race, National Road Championships
5th Omloop Het Nieuwsblad
2021
3rd Dwars door Vlaanderen
