= UnitedHealthcare Pro Cycling (men's team) =

American cycling team

UnitedHealthcare Pro Cycling Team

Team information
- UCI code: UHC
- Registered: United States
- Founded: 2003
- Disbanded: 2018
- Discipline: Road
- Status: UCI Professional Continental
- Bicycles: Orbea
- Website: Team home page

Key personnel
- General manager: Thierry Attias
- Team managers: Mike Tamayo; Hendrik Redant; Rachel Heal

Team name history
- 2003 2004–2008 2009 2010 2011–2018: Health Net Cycling Team; Health Net presented by Maxxis; OUCH presented by Maxxis; UnitedHealthcare presented by Maxxis; UnitedHealthcare Pro Cycling

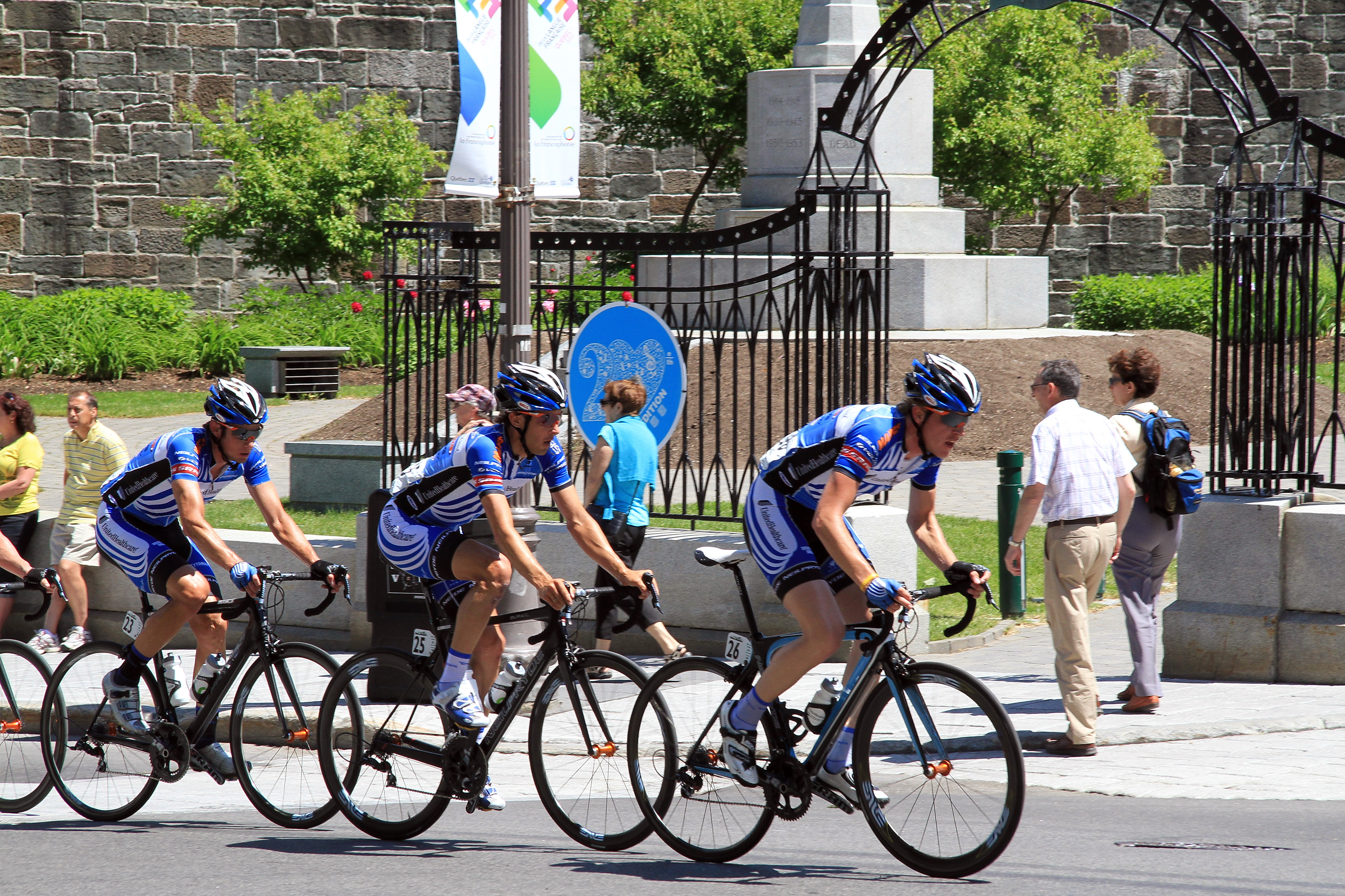
UnitedHealthcare at Tour de Beauce 2012

UnitedHealthcare Pro Cycling Team (UCI identifier: UHC) was a professional road bicycle racing team, run by Momentum Sports Group and based in the United States. The team is sponsored principally by UnitedHealth Group. It began at the end of 2009 as a reorganization of the OUCH Pro Cycling Team, with headlining cyclist Floyd Landis leaving the team. The team folded at the end of the 2018 season, with the main sponsor transferring to Rally Cycling.

== Team roster ==
Rider	Date of birth
Janier Acevedo (COL)	December 6, 1985 (age 40)
Carlos Alzate (COL)	March 23, 1983 (age 43)
Alexander Cataford (CAN)	September 1, 1993 (age 33)
Jonathan Clarke (AUS)	December 18, 1984 (age 41)
Daniel Eaton (USA)	July 4, 1993 (age 33)
Lucas Sebastián Haedo (ARG)	April 18, 1983 (age 43)
Adrian Hegyvary (USA)	January 15, 1984 (age 42)
Daniel Jaramillo (COL)	January 15, 1991 (age 35)

Rider	Date of birth
Luke Keough (USA)	August 10, 1991 (age 35)
Gavin Mannion (USA)	August 24, 1991 (age 35)
Eric Marcotte (USA)	8 February 1980 (age 46)
Travis McCabe (USA)	May 12, 1989 (age 37)
Lachlan Norris (AUS)	January 21, 1987 (age 39)
Tanner Putt (USA)	April 21, 1992 (age 34)
Serghei Țvetcov (ROM)	29 December 1988 (age 37)
Hugo Angel Velazquez (ARG)	16 July 1992 (age 34)

== Major wins ==
2003
Stage 1 Sea Otter Classic, Mike Sayers
Stage 3 GP de Beauce, Gordon Fraser
Stage 1 Herald Sun Tour, Mike Sayers
2004
Prologue Sea Otter Classic, Hayden Godfrey
Stage 1 & 7 Tour de Georgia, Gordon Fraser
Stage 5 Tour de Georgia, Jason McCartney
Canada Road Race Championship, Gordon Fraser
Stage 7 Tour de l'Avenir, Tyler Farrar
2005
Overall Redlands Bicycle Classic, Chris Wherry

Prologue, Chris Wherry

Overall Sea Otter Classic, Doug Ollerenshaw

Prologue, Gordon Fraser
Stage 2, Doug Ollerenshaw

Stage 6 Tour de Georgia, Gordon Fraser
Stage 3b Ronde de l'Isard, Tyler Farrar
Wachovia Invitational, Greg Henderson
Wachovia Classic, Gordon Fraser
Wachovia USPRO Championships, Chris Wherry
Stage 6 GP de Beauce, Doug Ollerenshaw
USPRO Criterium Championship, Tyler Farrar
Stage 2 Tour de l'Avenir, Tyler Farrar
2006
Australia, Time Trial Championships, Nathan O'Neill
Overall Tour de Taiwan, Kirk O'Bee

Stage 5, Kirk O'Bee

Reading Classic, Greg Henderson
Wachovia Cycling Series – Philadelphia, Greg Henderson
Stage 2 Herald Sun Tour, Karl Menzies
New Zealand, Road Race Championship, Hayden Roulston
2007
Australia, Time Trial Championships, Nathan O'Neill
Stage 1 Tour Down Under, Karl Menzies
Overall Tour de Taiwan, Shawn Milne

Stage 1, Shawn Milne

Canada, Time Trial Championships, Ryder Hesjedal
2008
Overall Tour de Taiwan, John Murphy

Stage 6, Kyle Gritters

Stage 8 Tour of Southland, Kirk O'Bee
2009
Stage 6 Vuelta Mexico Telmex, Cameron Evans
Stage 8 Vuelta Mexico Telmex, Andrew Pinfold
2010
Stage 3 & 5 Tour de Beauce, Marc de Maar
Netherlands Antilles, Road Race Championships, Marc de Maar
Netherlands Antilles, Time Trial Championships, Marc de Maar
2011
Stage 8 Tour de Langkawi, Robert Förster
Stage 2a Vuelta a Asturias, Robert Förster
Stage 4 Tour of Qinghai Lake, Robert Förster
Stage 1 Tour of Elk Grove, Karl Menzies
Stage 3 Tour of Elk Grove, Hilton Clarke
2012
Curaçao Road Race Championships, Marc de Maar
Curaçao Time Trial Championships, Marc de Maar
Overall Tour of the Gila, Rory Sutherland

Stage 1, Rory Sutherland

Overall Tour de Beauce, Rory Sutherland
Stage 1 Tour of Utah, Rory Sutherland
Stage 4 Tour of Utah, Jake Keough
Stage 1 Volta a Portugal, Jay Thomson
Stage 6 Volta a Portugal, Jason McCartney
Stage 7 Volta a Portugal, Kai Reus
Stage 6 USA Pro Cycling Challenge, Rory Sutherland
Stage 5 Tour of Britain, Marc de Maar
2013
World Track Championships (Scratch race), Martyn Irvine
Overall Tour of the Gila, Philip Deignan

Stage 4, Kiel Reijnen

Philly Cycling Classic, Kiel Reijnen
Stage 5 Tour de Beauce, Marc de Maar
Ireland National Track Championships (Individual pursuit), Martyn Irvine
Ireland National Track Championships (Scratch race), Martyn Irvine
Stage 6 Tour of Qinghai Lake, Robert Förster
Stage 13 Tour of Qinghai Lake, Jake Keough
Stage 10 Volta a Portugal, Jake Keough
Bucks County Classic, Kiel Reijnen
2014
Stage 5 Tour de Langkawi, Bradley White
Stage 1 Tour de Taiwan, Luke Keough
Stage 2 Tour of Norway, Marc de Maar
The Philadelphia Cycling Classic, Kiel Reijnen
Stage 1 USA Pro Cycling Challenge, Kiel Reijnen
United States National Track Championships (Team pursuit), Adrian Hegyvary
United States National Criterium Championships, John Murphy
2015
Overall Joe Martin Stage Race, John Murphy

Stages 2 & 3, John Murphy

Stage 1 Tour of Utah, Kiel Reijnen
Stage 3 USA Pro Cycling Challenge, Kiel Reijnen
Stage 7 USA Pro Cycling Challenge, John Murphy
2016
Stage 4 Herald Sun Tour, John Murphy
Stage 3 Tour de Langkawi, John Murphy
Stage 3 Joe Martin Stage Race, Carlos Alzate
Stage 5 Tour of the Gila, Daniel Jaramillo
Stage 5 Tour of Japan, Daniel Jaramillo
2017
Stage 3 Herald Sun Tour, Travis McCabe
Stages 2 & 8 Tour de Langkawi, Travis McCabe
Stage 3 Tour de Taiwan, Daniel Summerhill
Stage 2 Joe Martin Stage Race, Lucas Sebastián Haedo
Stages 2, 3 & 9 Tour du Maroc, Luke Keough
Overall Tour de Hongrie, Daniel Jaramillo

Stage 4, Daniel Jaramillo

Stage 5 Tour of Utah, Travis McCabe
2018
Stage 3 (ITT) Tour of the Gila, Serghei Țvetcov
Stage 5 Tour of the Gila, Gavin Mannion
Overall Tour de Korea, Serghei Țvetcov

Stage 3, Serghei Țvetcov

Stage 3a Tour de Beauce, Serghei Țvetcov
Chrono Kristin Armstrong, Serghei Țvetcov
Stages 1 & 3 Tour of Utah, Travis McCabe
Stage 2 (ITT) Colorado Classic, Gavin Mannion
Stage 2 Tour of Romania, Serghei Țvetcov

== National and world champions ==
2006
Australia Time Trial Championships, Nathan O'Neill
New Zealand Road Race Championship, Hayden Roulston
2007
Australia Time Trial Championships, Nathan O'Neill
Canada Time Trial Championships, Ryder Hesjedal
2010
Netherlands Antilles Road Race Championships, Marc de Maar
Netherlands Antilles Time Trial Championships, Marc de Maar
2012
Curaçao Road Race Championships Marc de Maar
Curaçao Time Trial Championships, Marc de Maar
2013
World Track Championships (Scratch race), Martyn Irvine
National Track Championships (Individual pursuit), Martyn Irvine
National Track Championships (Scratch race), Martyn Irvine
2014
National Track Championships (Team pursuit), Adrian Hegyvary
National Criterium Championships, John Murphy

== See also ==
- UnitedHealthcare Pro Cycling (women's team)
