= Hilton Clarke =

Australian racing cyclist

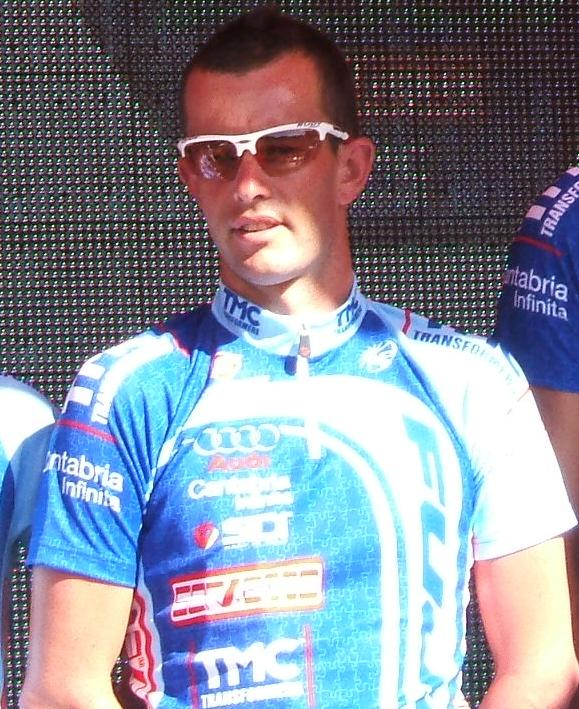

Personal information
- Full name: Hilton Clarke
- Born: 7 November 1979 (age 46) Ormond, Victoria, Australia
- Height: 1.73 m (5 ft 8 in)
- Weight: 70 kg (154 lb; 11 st 0 lb)

Cycling career
- Sport: Cycling
- Current team: Retired
- Discipline: Road
- Role: Rider
- Rider type: Sprinter

Amateur teams
- 2000: Carnegie
- 2001: NetZero Cycling Team
- 2002: Schroeder Iron Pro Cycling
- 2003: Barloworld
- 2004: Team Cyclingnews.com-Down Under

Professional teams
- 2005–2007: Navigators Insurance
- 2008: Toyota-United Pro Cycling Team
- 2009: Fuji–Servetto
- 2010: Bahati Foundation
- 2010–2015: UnitedHealthcare–Maxxis
- 2016: Cylance–Incycle

Hilton Clarke (born 7 November 1979) is an Australian former professional cyclist. Born in Ormond, Clarke became a professional in 2001. He was introduced to the sport by his father Hilton Clarke, an Olympic cyclist, at the age of 9.

== Major results ==
2000
1st Stage 3 Tour of Tasmania
1st Melbourne to Warrnambool Classic
2001
1st La Mirada Circuit Race
1st Warner Center Grand Prix
2003
Tour of Egypt

1st Stages 1 & 2

1st Stage 2 Herald Sun Tour
1st Ronde van Zuid-Beijerland
2004
1st Carnegie Caulfield Criterium
2005
Herald Sun Tour

1st Stage 7
1st Sprints classification

1st Stage 2 Tour de White Rock
1st Beverly Hills Cycling Classic
1st Round 5 Jayco Bay Series
2006
1st USPRO Criterium Championship
8th Overall NRC Individual Points Standings
2007
1st Saturn Rochester Twilight Criterium
1st Tour of Somerville
1st Kelly Cup
2008
1st Martin Luther King Criterium
1st, Del Mar Criterium
1st, LA Circuit Race
1st, Overall Del Mar Series Criterium
1st, Redlands Bicycle Classic Redlands Criterium
1st, Sunny King Criterium
1st, Downtown Walterboro Criterium
1st, Beaufort Memorial Cycling Classic
1st, Mt. Hood Cycling Classic Stage 2
1st, Tulsa Tough QuikTrip Blue Dome Critierium
1st, Louisville Metro Police Foundation Crit
1st, Wells Fargo Twilight Criterium
1st, Tour of Elk Grove Stage 1
1st, Capital Criterium
1st, USA Crits Finals
1st Launceston International Classic
2nd Melbourne to Warrnambool Classic
4th Overall Jayco Bay Cycling Classic
2010
1st Clarendon Cup
1st Stage 2, Redlands Bicycle Classic
1st Stage 3, San Dimas Stage Race
3rd Crystal City Cup.
2011
1st Overall, Air Force Association Cycling Classic
1st Clarendon Cup
2nd Crystal City Cup, Air Force Cycling Classic, Arlington, VA
1st Beaufort Memorial Classic, Beaufort, SC
2013
1st USA Crits Series

2nd USA Crits Finals, Las Vegas

2015
1st Overall Champion USA Cycling National Criterium Calendar (NCC)
1st Lake Bluff Criterium, Chicago, IL
1st Overall - Air Force Association Cycling Classic
1st Air Force Association Cycling Classic - Clarendon Cup Criterium
1st Air Force Association Cycling Classic - Crystal City Cup Criterium
1st Chevron Manhattan Beach Grand Prix, Manhattan Beach, CA
3rd Sunny King Criterium
