= Nevada City Classic =

One-day road cycling race held in Nevada City, California

Coordinates: 39.2640°N 121.0190°W

Race details
- Date: June (commonly on Father's Day)
- Region: Nevada City, California, United States
- Organiser: Charlie Allert

History
- First edition: 1961
- First winner: Bob Tetzlaff (USA)
- Most recent: Gavin Murray (USA)

History (women)
- Most recent: Eleanor Velez (USA)

The Nevada City Classic (previously: Tour of Nevada City; Father's Day Bicycle Classic), was a one-day road cycling race held in Nevada City, California. Established in 1960, the Nevada City Classic commonly occurs on Father's Day and brought thousands of visitors to Nevada County. While the first race brought out approximately 1,500 spectators, the numbers have swelled to 15,000 spectators in recent years. Sponsored by the Nevada City Chamber of commerce, the schedule included Women's, Junior's, and Master's races, in addition to the Men's main event. Past winners include Greg LeMond.

== Course ==
The 90-minute race included 40 laps on a twisting, hilly 1.1 mi (1.8 km) circuit with over 300 feet of climbing. The course, basically unchanged since its advent, was considered by experts to be the toughest one-mile criterium in the United States.

== History ==
Established in 1960, the Nevada City Classic was the largest and oldest bicycle race on the West Coast, as well as the second-oldest bicycle race in the country. It was initiated by Charlie Allert, a native of Dresden, Germany, who had been a bicycle racer and master lithographer before arriving in Nevada City by way of San Francisco. With a course laid out by Allert, the first race was held on Father's Day 1961.

The 1961 and 1962 races were won by Bob Tetzlaff, a Los Gatos school teacher. Starting in 1963 when he was 18 years old, Bob Parsons from Pasadena won the race the next five years. John Howard won in 1970. Greg LeMond was the winner for the three consecutive years of 1979-81 and he was subsequently honored when the Nevada City City Council proclaimed August 11, 1986 as "Greg LeMond Day". Todd Gogulski (1986, 1988), Scott Moninger (1994, 1997, 1999, 2006), Alexi Grewal (1993), and Levi Leipheimer (1998) also took the top spot. Having participated in the race 19 years earlier, Lance Armstrong returned in 2009, and won using illegal drugs and methods, and has been disqualified with the result voided It was hailed at the time as the first victory of his comeback as it preceded his return to the Tour de France. Ian Boswell was the winner in 2010.

In 1997, the race was designated a National Classic Pro Points Race, and thirteen years later, in 2010, its course became the starting point of the Stage 1 of the Tour of California.

The race was canceled in 2020 because of the Covid-19 pandemic and never resumed because of declining attendance in years prior.

== Winners ==
=== Men ===
Year	Winner	Second	Third
1961	(United States) Bob Tetzlaff		
1962	(United States) Bob Tetzlaff		
1963	(United States) Bob Parsons	(United States) Dave Capron	(Canada) Ian Mahon
1964	(United States) Bob Parsons	(United States) Tim Kelly	(United States) Sharp
1965	(United States) Bob Parsons	(United States) David Brink	(United States) Ward Thompson
1966	(United States) Bob Parsons		
1967	(United States) Bob Parsons	(United States) David Brink	(United States) Dan Butler
1968	(United States) David Brink	(United States) John Allis	(United States) Dan Butler
1969	(Canada) Bill Wild		
1970	(United States) John Howard		
1971	(United States) Fred Fisk	(United States) Geoffrey Conley	(United States) Richard Baronna
1972	(United States) Dave Walters	(United States) Don Davis	(United States) Harry Morton
1973	(United States) Keith Vierra	(United States) Gary Fisher	(United States) Steve Lundgren
1974	(United States) Ed Parrot	(Canada) Bill Wild	
1975	(Canada) Bill Wild	(United States) Don Davis	
1976	(United States) Mark Pringle	(United States) Larry Malone	(United States) Tim Kelly
1977	(United States) Rick Baldwin	(United States) Bob Cook	(United States) Larry Shields
1978	(United States) Bob Cook	(United States) Kent Bostick	(United States) Ron Miller
1979	(United States) Greg LeMond	(United States) William Watkins	
1980	(United States) Greg LeMond	(United States) Toby Power	(United States) Keith Vierra
1981	(United States) Greg LeMond	(United States) Greg Demgen	(United States) Wayne Stetina
1982	(United States) Toby Power	(United States) Jeff Pierce	(United States) Glenn Sanders
1983	(United States) Dale Stetina		
1984	(United States) Greg Demgen		
1985	(United States) Jeff Pierce		
1986	(United States) Todd Gogulski		
1987	(Canada) Gervais Rioux		
1988	(United States) Todd Gogulski		
1989	(United States) Mark Caldwell		
1990	(United States) Nate Reiss	(United States) Scott Moninger	(United States) Bart Bowen
1991	(United States) Chris Huber		
1992	(United States) Michael Engleman	(United States) Scott Moninger	(New Zealand) Wayne Morgan
1993	(United States) Alexi Grewal		
1994	(United States) Scott Moninger	(United States) Michael Engleman	(United States) Bobby Julich
1995	(United States) Michael Engleman	(United States) Tyler Hamilton	(United States) Nate Reiss
1996	(United States) Chad Gerlach	(United States) Thurlow Rogers	(United States) Scott Moninger
1997	(United States) Scott Moninger	(United States) Chris Horner	(United States) Chad Gerlach
1998	(United States) Michael Engleman	(United States) Levi Leipheimer	(United States) David Clinger
1999	(United States) Scott Moninger	(United States) David Clinger	(United States) Chad Gerlach
2000	(United States) John Peters	(United States) Trent Klasna	(United States) Frank McCormack
2001	(Mexico) Ernesto Lechuga		
2002	(United States) Antonio Cruz		
2003	(Canada) Eric Wohlberg	(United States) James Mattis	(United States) Justin England
2004	(United States) Justin England	(United States) Antonio Cruz	(United States) Philip Zajicek
2005	(United States) Burke Swindlehurst	(United States) Andrew Bajadali	(United States) Alex Candelario
2006	(United States) Scott Moninger	(New Zealand) Gordon McCauley	(United States) Antonio Cruz
2007	(South Africa) Darren Lill	(United States) Scott Moninger	(United States) Antonio Cruz
2008	(United States) Justin England	(United States) Scott Nydam	(United States) Graham Howard
2009	(United States) ~~Lance Armstrong~~	(United States) Ben Jacques-Maynes	(United States) Levi Leipheimer
2010	(United States) Ian Boswell	(United States) Paul Mach	(United States) Zachary Davies
2011	(United States) Ian Boswell	(United States) Evan Huffman	(United States) Nathaniel English
2012	(United States) Stephen Leece	(United States) Nathaniel English	(United States) Chuck Hutcheson
2013	(United States) Stephen Leece	(United States) Roman Kilun	(United States) Jon Hornbeck
2014	(United States) Walton Brush	(United States) Torey Philipp	(United States) Chris Harland-Dunaway
2015	(United States) Nathaniel English	(United States) Max Jenkins	(Canada) Colin Daw
2016	(United States) Jason Saltzman	(United States) Cameron Bronstein	(United States) Chris Riekert
2017	(United States) Chris Riekert	(United States) Cameron Bronstein	(United States) Torey Philipp
2018	(United States) Chris Riekert	(United States) Aria Kiani	(United States) Robert Skinner
2019	(United States) Gavin Murray	(United States) William Myers	(United States) Ford Murphy
2020	Canceled		

=== Women ===
Year	Winner	Second	Third
1978	(United States) Heidi Hopkins		
1979	(United States) Heidi Hopkins		
1980	(United States) Cindy Olivarri		
1981	(United States) Cindy Olivarri		
1982	Canceled		
1983	(United States) Charlene Nicholson		
1984	(United States) Cindy Olivarri		
1985	(United States) Inga Thompson		
1986	(United States) Rebecca Twigg		
1987	(United States) Chris Paragary		
1988	(United States) Katrin Tobin		
1989	(United States) Inga Thompson		
1990	(United States) Katrin Tobin		
1991	(United States) Sally Zack		
1992	(United States) Suzie Forsyth	(United States) Michelle Blain	(United States) Jacquie Phelan
1993	(United States) Shari Kain	(United States) Jacquie Phelan	(United States) Julie Young
1994	(United States) Shari Kain	(Canada) Linda Jackson	(New Zealand) Susy Pryde
1995	(United States) Stace Cooper	(United States) Ellen Krimmel	(United States) Belinda Heerwagen
1996	(United States) Laura Mullen		
1997	(United States) Julie Hudetz	(United States) Cynthia Mommsen	(United States) Helena Drumm
1998	(United States) Joan Wilson		
1999	(United States) Karen Kurreck	(United States) Julie Hanson	(United States) Caren Spore
2000	(Mexico) Belem Guerrero	(United States) Julie Young	(New Zealand) Susy Pryde
2001	(United States) Cynthia Mommsen		
2002	?		
2003	(United States) Eryn Hanna	(Australia) Jane Despas	(United States) Cynthia Mommsen
2004	(United States) Cindy Carroll		
2005	(United States) Barbara Howe	(United States) Cynthia Mommsen	(United States) Taitt Sato
2006	(United States) Helene Drumm	(United States) Kimberly Anderson	(United States) Amber Rais
2007	(United States) Shelley Olds		
2008	(United States) Sarah Bamberger	(Canada) Betina Hold	(United States) Ally Stacher
2009	(United States) Shelley Olds	(United States) Brooke Miller	(Czech Republic) Kateřina Nash
2010	(Czech Republic) Kateřina Nash	(United States) Megan Guarnier	(United States) Kendall Ryan
2011	(Czech Republic) Kateřina Nash	(United States) Emily Kachorek	(United States) Susannah Breen
2012	(Czech Republic) Kateřina Nash	(Brazil) Flávia Oliveira	(United States) Amy Thornquist
2013	(United States) Elle Anderson	(United States) Joanna Bechtel	(United States) Cristina Hughes
2014	(United States) Katie Hall	(United States) Kathryn Donovan	(United States) Alison Starnes
2015	(United States) Shelley Evans	(United States) Chloé Dygert	(United States) Liza Rachetto
2016	(Canada) Diane Moug	(United States) Sara Enders	(United States) Amy Cameron
2017	(United States) Amy Cameron	(United States) Megan Ruble	(United States) Melanie Wong
2018	(United States) Lisa Cordova	(United States) Amity Gregg	(United States) Ellie Velez
2019	(United States) Ellie Velez	(United States) Jennifer Tafoya	(United States) Megan Brinkmeyer
2020	Canceled		
