= Coors Light (cycling team) =

Cycling team in the United States

Team information
- Registered: United States
- Founded: 1989
- Disbanded: 1994
- Discipline: Road
- Status: Div I (1989–1994)
- Bicycles: Serotta
- Components: Shimano

Team name history
- 1989; 1990–1992; 1993–1994: Coors Light - ADR; Coors Light; Coors Light - Serotta

Coors Light Cycling Team was an elite road bicycle racing cycling team in the United States. The team was very prominent in races held in the United States, but they did not achieve many other major results.

== 1994 team roster ==
As at 1 January 1994:

Rider	Date of birth
Andy Bishop (USA)	26 May 1965 (aged 28)
Michael Engleman (USA)	20 May 1958 (aged 35)
Roberto Gaggioli (ITA)	10 September 1962 (aged 31)
Tyler Hamilton (USA)	1 March 1971 (aged 22)
Chris Huber (USA)	21 September 1961 (aged 32)
Ron Kiefel (USA)	11 April 1960 (aged 33)

Rider	Date of birth
John Lieswyn (USA)	18 August 1968 (aged 25)
David Mann (GBR)	26 June 1962 (aged 31)
Scott McKinley (USA)	15 October 1968 (aged 25)
Scott Moninger (USA)	20 October 1966 (aged 27)
Greg Oravetz (USA)	25 August 1966 (aged 27)
Joseph Parkin (USA)	5 February 1967 (aged 26)

== Major results ==
Results:

1989
Philly Cycling Classic, Greg Oravetz
United States National Road Race Championships, Greg Oravetz
1990
Stages 10 & 13 Tour DuPont, Michel Zanoli
Reading Classic, David Farmer
Overall Killington Stage Race, Greg Oravetz

Stage 2, Michel Zanoli
Stage 3, Greg Oravetz

1991
Overall Cascade Cycling Classic, Greg Oravetz
Stage 1 Tour DuPont, Davis Phinney
Thrift Drug Classic, Michael Engleman
Nevada City Classic, Chris Huber
United States National Criterium Championships, Greg Oravetz
Overall Killington Stage Race, Roy Knickmann

Stage 3, Roy Knickmann
Stage 5, Scott Moninger

Overall Herald Sun Tour, Michael Engleman

Stages 4 & 5, Michael Engleman
Stages 8 & 13, Greg Oravetz

1992
Stages 3 & 12 Vuelta a Colombia, Roberto Gaggioli
Stage 2 Tour DuPont, David Mann
Stage 10 Tour DuPont, Alexi Grewal
Overall West-Virginia Classic, Scott Moninger

Prologue, Greg Oravetz

Overall Tour of the Adirondacks, Michael Engleman

Stage 3, Stephen Swart

Nevada City Classic, Michael Engleman
Overall Casper Classic, Michael Engleman

Stage 1, David Mann
Stages 2 & 6, Michael Engleman
Stage 3 (TTT)

United States National Criterium Championships, Stephen Swart
Overall Celestial Bicycle Classic, Michael Engleman

Stages 1 & 2, Stephen Swart
Stage 3, Michael Engleman
Stage 4, David Mann
Stage 5, Davis Phinney

Overall Killington Stage Race, Scott Moninger

Prologue, David Mann
Stage 1, Davis Phinney
Stages 2 & 4, Scott Moninger

Satges 10 & 11 Herald Sun Tour, Stephen Swart
1993
Stage 7 Tour DuPont, Ron Kiefel
Nevada City Classic, Alexi Grewal
Reading Classic, Roberto Gaggioli
Overall Killington Stage Race, Michael Engleman

Prologue, Michael Engleman
Stages 2 & 4, Scott Moninger

Overall Herald Sun Tour, David Mann

Stages 1 & 8, David Mann
Stage 11, Stephen Swart
Stage 12, Scott Moninger

Overall Australian Alpine Classic, Roberto Gaggioli

Stage 1, Roberto Gaggioli
Stage 2 & 5, Scott Moninger

1994
Overall Cascade Cycling Classic, Michael Engleman
Stage 5 West-Virginia Classic, Scott Moninger
Nevada City Classic, Scott Moninger
Reading Classic, Ron Kiefel
Overall Killington Stage Race, Michael Engleman

Prologue & Stage 2, Michael Engleman
Stage 1, David Mann
