= Scott McKinley =

American cyclist

Personal information
- Born: October 15, 1968 (age 58) Seattle, Washington, United States

Cycling career
- Sport: Cycling
- Current team: Retired
- Discipline: Road
- Role: Rider

Professional teams
- 1988–1990: 7-Eleven–Hoonved
- 1991: Motorola
- 1992: Spago
- 1993–1994: Coors Light–Serotta
- 1995–1996: Saturn

Scott McKinley (born October 15, 1968) is an American former cyclist. He competed in the road race at the 1988 Summer Olympics.

== Major results ==
1986
1st Stage 1 (TTT) Dusika Jugend Tour
8th World Junior Road race
1989
1st Houchtalen-Helchteren
7th Reading Classic
1990
1st Stage 1 Étoile de Bessèges
1st Stage 1 Westfalen Rundfahrt
1992
9th Lancaster Classic
10th Reading Classic
1993
National Championships

2nd Criterium
2nd Road race

2nd Norwest Cycling Cup
6th Philly Cycling Classic
9th First Union Grand Prix
10th Lancaster Classic
1994
10th First Union Grand Prix
