= Navigators (cycling team) =

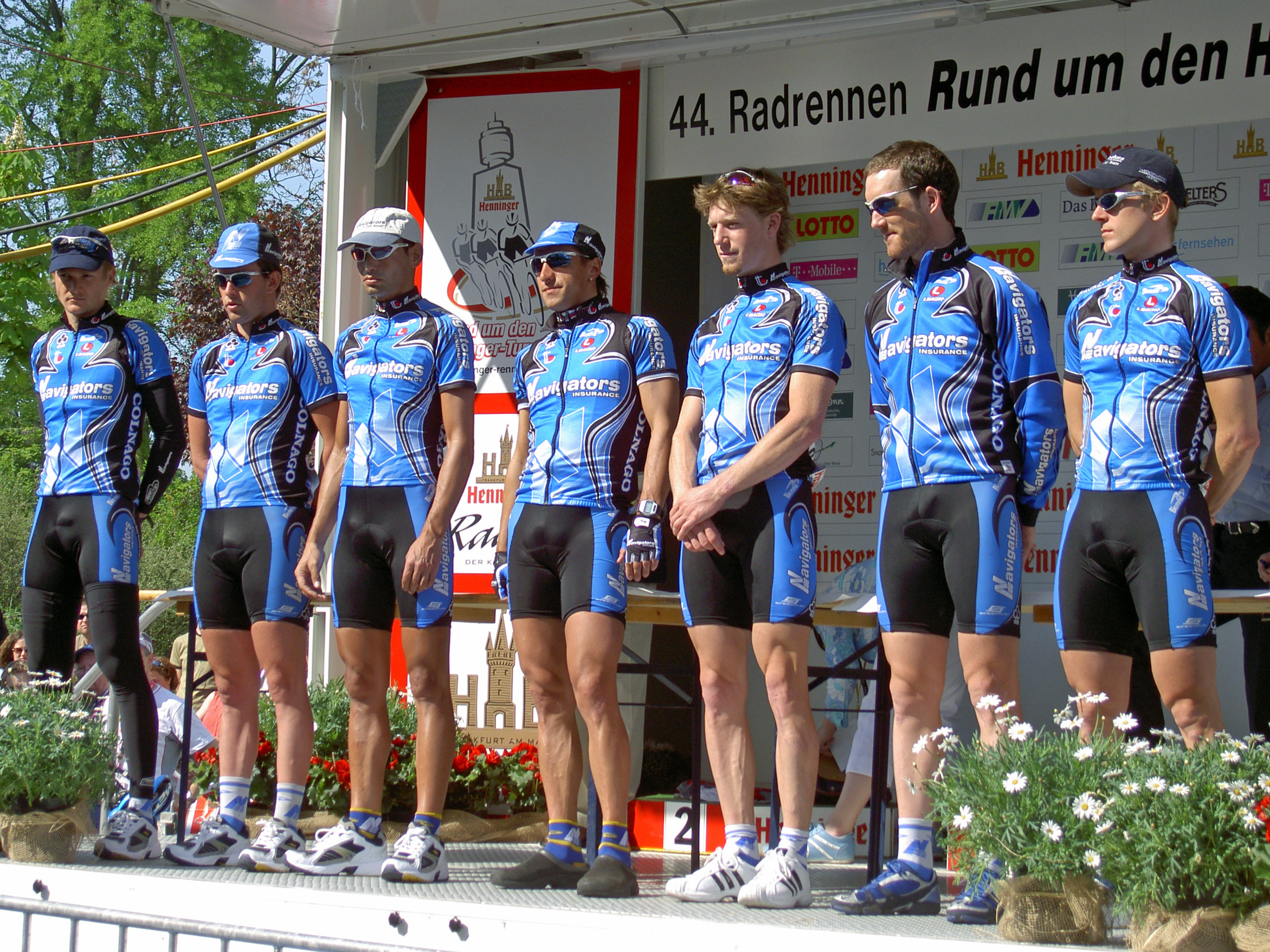

Team information
- Registered: United States
- Founded: 1992
- Disbanded: 2007
- Discipline: Road
- Status: National (1992–1993); UCI Continental (1994–1998); UCI Professional Continental (1999–2007)
- Bicycles: Colnago
- Components: Stella Azzurra / Campagnolo
- Website: Team home page

Team name history
- 1994–1997; 1998–2000; 2001–2007: Navigators; Navigators Cycling Team; Navigators Insurance Cycling Team

Navigators Insurance Cycling Team (UCI Code: NIC) was an elite road bicycle racing cycling team in the United States. Navigators focused on USA Cycling and UCI America Tour events. The team has competed in every Tour de Georgia. The team was founded in 1992 by Raymond Cipollini and James Eichvalds. The team turned Pro in 1994 and hired Edward Beamon to be its director.

Navigators finished third team on the 2005–06 UCI America Tour.

== 2007 team roster ==
As at 1 January 2007:

Rider	Date of birth
Benjamin Brooks (AUS)	21 March 1979 (aged 27)
Glen Chadwick (NZL)	17 October 1976 (aged 30)
Hilton Clarke (AUS)	7 November 1979 (aged 27)
Matt Cooke (USA)	5 August 1979 (aged 27)
Benjamin Day (AUS)	11 December 1978 (aged 28)
Oleg Grishkine (RUS)	10 February 1975 (aged 31)
Kristian House (GBR)	6 October 1979 (aged 27)
Valery Kobzarenko (UKR)	5 February 1977 (aged 29)
Sergey Lagutin (RUS)	14 January 1981 (aged 25)

Rider	Date of birth
Darren Lill (RSA)	20 August 1982 (aged 24)
David O'Loughlin (IRL)	29 April 1978 (aged 28)
Ciarán Power (IRL)	8 May 1976 (aged 30)
Viktor Rapinski (BLR)	17 June 1981 (aged 25)
David Rodriguez (USA)	14 August 1979 (aged 27)
Bernard van Ulden (USA)	11 September 1979 (aged 27)
Kyle Wamsley (USA)	3 January 1980 (aged 26)
Michael Henry Wolf (USA)	21 July 1985 (aged 21)
Philip Zajicek (USA)	20 March 1979 (aged 27)

== Major wins ==
Results:

1995
Reading Classic, Matt Koschara
1997
Stage 2 Vuelta al Tachira en Bicicleta, Skip Spangenburg
Nevada City Classic, Scott Moninger
Stage 6 Clasica Regatas Lima, Skip Spangenburg
1998
Stage 5 Redlands Classic, Trent Klasna
Overall Sea Otter Classic, Trent Klasna
Nevada City Classic, Michael Engleman
Stage 3 Tour de Beauce, Skip Spangenburg
Prologue & Stage 4 Killington Stage Race, Scott Moninger
Prologue & Stage 1 Clasica Regatas Lima, Skip Spangenburg
Stages 11 & 12 Herald Sun Tour, Scott Moninger
Mountain Jersey Herald Sun Tour, Scott Moninger
1999
Stage 5 Cascade Cycling Classic, Vassili Davidenko
Stage 9 New Zealand Cycle Classic, Brendan Vesty
Stage 1 Sea Otter Classic, Trent Klasna
Overall Killington Stage Race, Trent Klasna

Stages 1, 2 & 3, Trent Klasna

Overall Tour de Okinawa, Mark Walters
2000
Prologue Redlands Classic, Todd Littlehales
Points Jersey Redlands Classic, Todd Littlehales
Tour Lefleur, Adham Sbeih
Stages 2, 3 & 6 Tour de Beauce, Vassili Davidenko
Stage 2 Killington Stage Race, Christopher Baldwin
2001
Stages 3 & 5 New Zealand Cycle Classic, Brendan Vesty
Stage 2 Sea Otter Classic, Vassili Davidenko
Points Jersey Sea Otter Classic, Vassili Davidenko
Stage 6 Giro d'Abruzzo, Vassili Davidenko
Stages 4 & 6 Cascade Cycling Classic, Christopher Baldwin
2002
Grand Prix de Rennes, Kirk O'Bee
GP Pino Cerami, Kirk O'Bee
Tallinn-Tartu GP, Oleg Grishkine
Overall Rás Tailteann, Ciaran Power
Philly Cycling Classic, Mark Walters
Stage 2 Cascade Cycling Classic, Burke Swindlehurst
Mountain classification Tour of Southland, Tom Leaper
2003
Grand Prix de Rennes, Oleg Grishkine
Stage 1 Tour de Georgia, Henk Vogels
Stages 3 & 7 Rás Tailteann, Ciaran Power
Stage 2 Tour de Beauce, Oleg Grishkine
Stage 5 Tour de Beauce, Christopher Baldwin
Stage 6 Tour de Beauce, Vassili Davidenko
Overall Tour of South China Sea, Oleg Grishkine

Stages 1, 4, 5 & 6, Oleg Grishkine
Points classification, Oleg Grishkine

2004
Bay Cycling Classic, David McKenzie
Stage 6 Tour of Turkey, Viktor Rapinski
Tour de Beauce

Stage 6, Ciaran Power
Points classification, Viktor Rapinski
Mountain classification, Jeff Louder

Stage 3 Cascade Cycling Classic, Christopher Baldwin
Stages 1, 4 & 9 Tour of Qinghai Lake, Viktor Rapinski
Stage 2 Tour of Qinghai Lake, Jeff Louder
Points classification Tour of Qinghai Lake, Viktor Rapinski
Stage 4 Tour of Queensland, David McKenzie
2005
Stage 5 Bay Cycling Classic, Hilton Clarke
Australia National Time Trial Championships, Nathan O'Neill
Stage 4 Tour de Langkawi, Nathan O'Neill
Overall Tour de Beauce, Nathan O'Neill

Youth classification, David O'Loughlin
Stage 3, David O'Loughlin
Stage 4, Nathan O'Neill
Stage 5, Vassili Davidenko

United States National Time Trial Championships, Christopher Baldwin
Poland National Time Trial Championships, Piotr Mazur
Ireland National Road Race Championships, David O'Loughlin
Stage 3 Cascade Cycling Classic, Nathan O'Neill
Stages 4 & 6 Cascade Cycling Classic, Kirk O'Bee
Stage 7 Herald Sun Tour, Hilton Clarke
2006
Overall Bay Cycling Classic, Hilton Clarke
Stages 4 & 7 Rás Tailteann, Ciaran Power
Mountains classification Rás Tailteann, Ciaran Power
Overall Tour de Beauce, Valery Kobzarenko

Points classification, Sergey Lagutin
Stage 1, Valery Kobzarenko
Stage 3, Sergey Lagutin

Overall Rochester Criterium, Hilton Clarke
Stage 3 Cascade Cycling Classic, Burke Swindlehurst
Overall Tour of Elk Grove, Hilton Clarke
United States National Criterium Championships, Hilton Clarke
Ireland National Time Trial Championships, David O'Loughlin
Overall The Reading 120, Shawn Milne
Stage 1 Herald Sun Tour, Hilton Clarke
Points classification Tour of Utah, Sergey Lagutin
Stage 1 Tour of Utah, Sergey Lagutin
2007
New Zealand National Time Trial Championships, Glen Chadwick
Stage 1 Rheinland-Pfalz Rundfahrt, Sergey Lagutin
Overall Tour de Beauce, Ben Day

Points classification, Ben Day
Stages 2 & 3, Glen Chadwick
Stage 4, Oleg Grishkine
Stage 5, Ben Day

Overall US Air Force Classic, Kyle Wamsley
Nevada City Classic, Darren Lill
Overall Rochester Criterium, Hilton Clarke
Ireland National Road Race Championships, David O'Loughlin
Overall Cascade Cycling Classic, Phil Zajicek

Stage 3, Phil Zajicek
