= Roberto Gaggioli =

Italian cyclist

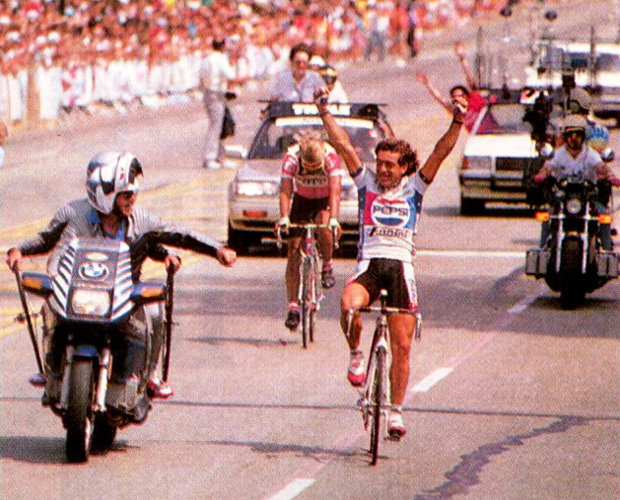
- Roberto Gaggioli in 1988

Personal information
- Born: 10 September 1962 (age 64) Vinci, Italy

Cycling career
- Sport: Cycling
- Current team: Retired
- Discipline: Road
- Role: Rider

Professional teams
- 1985–1986: Alpilatte–Olmo–Cierre
- 1987–1988: Pepsi-Cola
- 1989: Eurocar–Mosoca–Galli
- 1990–1994: Coors Light
- 1995: Guiltless Gourmet
- 1996: Chevrolet–LA Sheriff
- 1997: Plymouth–Elsworth
- 1998: Oilme–Klein
- 2001: DeFeet–LeMond
- 2002: Amore & Vita–Beretta
- 2002: Schroeder Iron
- 2004–2005: Team Monex

Roberto Gaggioli (born 10 September 1962 in Vinci) is an Italian former cyclist.

Professional from 1985 to 2005, Gaggioli spent most of his career in the United States. He won the Philadelphia International Championship in 1988, and the International Cycling Classic in 1990 and 1992. He rode in the 1986 Giro d'Italia, finishing in 127th position.

His father Luciano Gaggioli was a professional cyclist from 1960 to 1963. He married Lynn Brotzman, also a professional cyclist.

== Major results ==
1986
1st Coppa Bernocchi
1987
1st Fitchburg Longsjo Classic
1st Stage 8 Coors Classic
2nd De Kustpijl
1988
1st Philadelphia International Championship
1st Stage 3 Giro del Trentino
1st Overall Tour of Somerville
1990
1st International Cycling Classic
1991
1st Stage 2 Cascade Classic
1992
1st International Cycling Classic
1st Stages 3 & 12 Vuelta a Colombia
1993
1st New Jersey National Bank Classic
1st Stage 2 Fitchburg Longsjo Classic
1st Stage 1 Settimana Ciclistica Lombarda
1994
1st Stage 4 Redlands Bicycle Classic
1995
1st Stages 1 & 10 Herald Sun Tour
1st Stage 5 Tour de Toona
1st Overall Valley of the Sun Stage Race

1st Stage 3

1996
1st Stage 1a Herald Sun Tour
2nd Philadelphia International Championship
1998
1st Stage 3 Tour de Langkawi
2001
1st Stage 3 Tour of Croatia
