= Andy Bishop (cyclist) =

American cyclist (1965–2026)

Personal information
- Full name: Andrew Bishop
- Born: May 26, 1965 Tucson, Arizona, US
- Died: June 2, 2026 (aged 61) New Hampshire, US

Cycling career
- Sport: Cycling
- Disciplines: Road (1985–1996); Mountain (1996–2000)
- Role: Rider

Amateur team
- 1985–1987: Gilmour Bicycles

Professional teams
- 1988–1989: PDM–Ultima–Concorde
- 1990: Spago
- 1990–1993: 7-Eleven
- 1994: Coors Light–Serotta
- 1995: Saab
- 1997: Comptel Data Systems-Colorado Cyclist
- 1995–2000: Gary Fisher Mountain Bike Team

Andy Bishop (May 26, 1965 – June 2, 2026) was an American professional racing cyclist from Tucson. He finished the Tour de France three times, riding with the Team Classification winners PDM–Ultima–Concorde in 1988. In 1995, he won the Herald Sun Tour. He lived in Williston, Vermont and has two children. He was a full-time professional photographer and was the owner of Andy Bishop Photography. He coached former national champion mountain biker Lea Davison. Bishop was also a math teacher at Harwood Union High School, where he taught courses such as Data Science, Geometry, and Personal Finance. He co-coached the Harwood Nordic Team.

Bishop died in New Hampshire of cancer on June 2, 2026, at the age of 61.

== Major results ==
1987
1st Overall Tour of the Gila
1st Stage 7 Peace Race
1989
1st Stages 4 & 6 Ruta Mexico
9th Overall Tour of America
10th Halle–Ingooigem
1990
1st Stage 7 Tour DuPont
2nd Road race, National Championships
5th Philadelphia International Cycling Classic
10th Overall Vuelta a Venezuela
1991
6th (TTT) GP de la Libération
9th Thrift Drug Classic
1992
2nd Road race, National Championships
2nd Druivenkoers Overijse
2nd Thrift Drug Classic
5th Philly Cycling Classic
7th Overall Tour de Luxembourg
1993
5th Thrift Drug Classic
8th Overall Tour de Luxembourg
8th Trofeo Laigueglia
1995
1st Overall Herald Sun Tour

1st Points classification
1st Stage 6

3rd Overall Killington Stage Race
4th Lancaster Classic
4th Thrift Drug Classic
6th Norwest Cycling Cup
10th First Union Grand Prix
1996
5th Overall Tour of China
7th Overall Herald Sun Tour

1st Stage 9

1998
1st Stage 12 Ruta Mexico

=== General classification results timeline ===
Grand Tour general classification results
Grand Tour	1988	1989	1990	1991	1992
Vuelta a España	Did not compete during career				
Giro d'Italia	—	—	80	—	—
Tour de France	135	—	116	126	DNF
