= Tour of the Gila =

American cycling stage race

Race details
- Date: April – May
- Region: New Mexico, United States. (North America)
- Competition: UCI America Tour
- Type: Stage race
- Organiser: Tour of the Gila Inc.
- Web site: www.tourofthegila.com

History (men)
- First edition: 1987
- Editions: 37 (as of 2025)
- First winner: Andy Bishop (USA)
- Most wins: Drew Miller (USA); Burke Swindlehurst (USA) (3 wins)
- Most recent: Henrique Avancini (BRA)

Women's history
- First edition: 1987
- Editions: 36 (as of 2025)
- First winner: Nancy Shipp (USA)
- Most wins: Mara Abbott (USA) (6 wins)
- Most recent: Lauren Stephens (USA)

The Tour of the Gila is a cycling stage race for both men and women located in New Mexico, United States. It is sponsored by the component maker SRAM. The "Gila" began in 1987. Beginning in 2012, the men's Gila has been added to the UCI America Tour as a UCI classification 2.2 stage race, which permits UCI ProTeams to enter if they so choose; beginning in 2015, the women's Gila has also been added to the women's UCI international tour as a UCI classification 2.2 stage race.

Beginning in Silver City, New Mexico, the men's course covers around 540 kilometres (340 miles) over five days, while the women's course covers about 100 kilometres (62 miles) less. It consists of three road races (stages 1, 2 and 5, nicknamed the "Gila Monster"), an Individual Time Trial (stage 3) and a Criterium (stage 4). Through 2011, the Tour of the Gila was classified as a national race, which prohibits both UCI ProTour and UCI ProContinental teams from competing in it. In 2009 and 2010, through a special agreement with the UCI, individuals from those teams could compete as part of teams that were limited to three competitors, which led to a resurgence of interest among male cyclists in the Tour of the Gila.

Beginning in 2011, though, individuals from UCI ProTeams were completely prohibited from competing in such races. The Gila planned to upgrade to a UCI Americas Tour race in 2011 as a result, but it was not able to secure sufficient funding and had to revert to a U.S. national race. However, it upgraded to UCI America Tour status for 2012 and has remained on the UCI Americas Tour ever since, despite the collapse in American cycling sponsorship in 2013.

The women's race remained a U.S. national race through 2014, but was also added to the UCI Americas calendar in 2015, which was accompanied by a funding crisis that threatened the cancellation of both races. In the end, however, sufficient additional funding was found to continue both races as UCI events.

During the 2017 edition, Chad Young, a 21-year-old rider on Axeon–Hagens Berman, died from injuries sustained in a crash on a downhill section of the queen stage.

== Recent editions ==
=== 2009 ===
Before the 2009 running, the race almost folded before SRAM was brought in as principal sponsor. Shortly thereafter, the race entered the spotlight when three riders from Astana (which was also sponsored by SRAM) -- Lance Armstrong and his Astana teammates Levi Leipheimer and Chris Horner—announced they would attend the race in preparation for the Giro d'Italia. In addition, it was Armstrong's first race after he underwent surgery to repair a broken collarbone sustained in the Vuelta a Castilla y León. The three entered the race under the team name "Mellow Johnny's", in reference to Armstrong's nickname and the name of his Austin bicycle shop. Leipheimer went on to win the event overall, while Armstrong took second. On the women's side, Olympic gold medalist Kristin Armstrong won for the second time, during her planned final season (though she un-retired in 2011).

=== 2010 ===
Once again, Leipheimer and Armstrong competed as part of Armstrong's "Mellow Johnny's" team, along with Team RadioShack teammate Jason McCartney. Armstrong also entered a "Livestrong" team of under-23 riders, including Jesse Sergent, who won the stage 3 time trial, and Taylor Phinney, who won stage 4, which, when combined with Leipheimer's stage 1 victory, gave Armstrong's teams victories in three of the five stages. Fellow American professionals Tom Danielson and David Zabriskie, who ride for Garmin–Slipstream, also entered, as part of Zabriskie's "DZ Nuts" team. Ultimately, Leipheimer defeated Danielson by 59 seconds for his second consecutive Gila title. On the women's side, Mara Abbott, the 2007 winner, won again.

=== 2011 ===
After the success of the previous two editions of the Tour of the Gila, the event's organizers applied for the race to be added to the 2010–11 UCI America Tour calendar. However, the organizers were unable to attract sufficient funding and had to request in January 2011 that the race be moved back to the U.S. national calendar. As a result, no UCI Pro Tour riders entered, unlike the previous two years. The men's race was won by Francisco Mancebo of Realcyclist.com, who won two road stages, with 18-year-old Australian Dale Parker of Armstrong's Trek-Livestrong U23 team winning the time trial and finishing second. In the women's race, 1996 Olympic medalist Clara Hughes of Pactimo Cycling won the time trial and criterium stages and defeated defending champion Mara Abbott of the Italian team Diadora Pasta Zara by about three minutes.

=== 2012 ===
The 2012 edition was scheduled for May 2 to 6, 2012, with the same stages as during the previous three editions. Because of the Tour of the Gila's upgrade to UCI America Tour status, Tour organizers are required to invite the top three teams in the UCI America Tour rankings from the prior year. Ultimately, three UCI Pro Continental teams chose to enter: UnitedHealthcare and Team Type 1–Sanofi from the US and Champion System from China. National teams from Mexico and Colombia also competed. The women's race, with its higher prize money, attracted a field led by two-time champion (and defending Olympic gold medalist) Kristin Armstrong of Team Exergy TWENTY12. In the race, American Rory Sutherland of UnitedHealthcare won the first stage and stayed close in the others to win the men's title by 15 seconds over Chad Beyer of Competitive Cyclist Racing Team, while Armstrong won four of the five stages to win the women's title for the third time by a decisive 6:41 over Carmen Small. Surprisingly, the Bontrager-LiveStrong under-23 youth team, a remnant of the now-defunct Team RadioShack, took the top two places in the "Gila Monster" final stage with Lawson Craddock and Ian Boswell and won the men's team competition.

=== Classification jerseys ===
- – leader of the General classification
- – leader of the Points classification
- – leader of the Mountains classification
- – leader of the Young rider classification

== Winners ==
=== Men ===
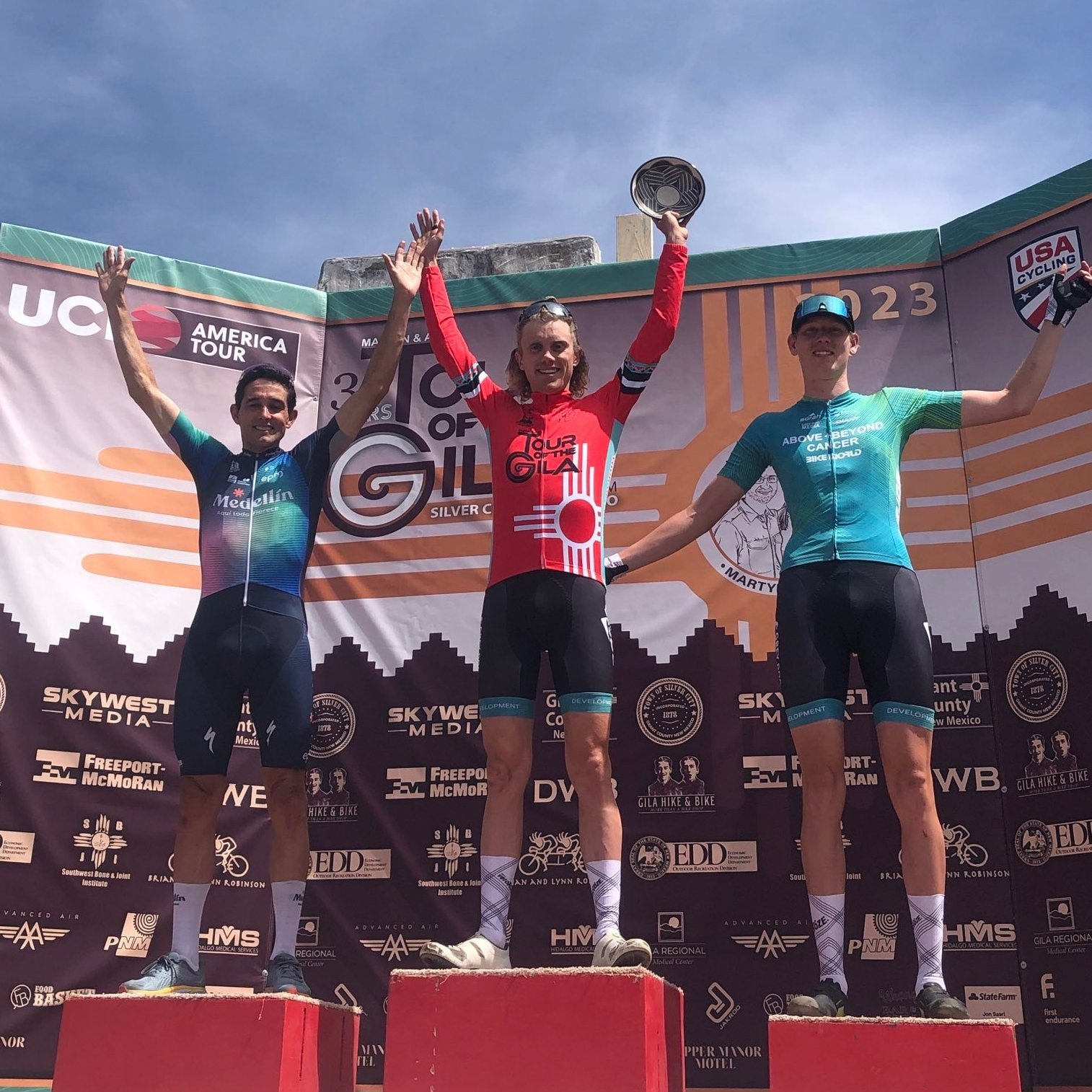
Alex Hoehn won the 2023 edition

| Year | Country | Rider | Team |
|---|---|---|---|
| 1987 | United States | Andy Bishop | |
| 1988 | United States | Gavin O'Grady | Cannondale Racing Team |
| 1989 | United States | John Lieswyn | |
| 1990 | United States | Drew Miller | |
| 1991 | Sweden | Björn Bäckmann | |
| 1992 | United States | Kevin Livingston | |
| 1993 | Colombia | José Robles | |
| 1994 | United States | Drew Miller | |
| 1995 | United States | Jonathan Vaughters | |
| 1996 | United States | Burke Swindlehurst | |
| 1997 | United States | Bart Bowen | Saturn |
| 1998 | United States | Burke Swindlehurst | Nutra Fig |
| 1999 | United States | Chris Wherry | Saturn Cycling Team |
| 2000 | Canada | Eric Wohlberg | Shaklee |
| 2001 | United States | Scott Moninger | Mercury–Viatel |
| 2002 | United States | Chris Wherry | Mercury Cycling Team |
| 2003 | United States | Drew Miller | Trek–Volkswagen |
| 2004 | United States | Scott Moninger | Health Net–Maxxis |
| 2005 | United States | Burke Swindlehurst | Team Seasilver |
| 2006 | United States | Chris Baldwin | Toyota–United |
| 2007 | Australia | Nathan O'Neill | Health Net–Maxxis |
| 2008 | Colombia | Gregorio Ladino | Tecos de la Universidad de Guadalajara |
| 2009 | United States | Levi Leipheimer | Mellow Johnny's |
| 2010 | United States | Levi Leipheimer | Mellow Johnny's |
| 2011 | Spain | Francisco Mancebo | Realcyclist.com Cycling Team |
| 2012 | Australia | Rory Sutherland | UnitedHealthcare |
| 2013 | Ireland | Philip Deignan | UnitedHealthcare |
| 2014 | United States | Carter Jones | Optum–Kelly Benefit Strategies |
| 2015 | Canada | Rob Britton | Team SmartStop |
| 2016 | Australia | Lachlan Morton | Jelly Belly–Maxxis |
| 2017 | United States | Evan Huffman | Rally Cycling |
| 2018 | Canada | Rob Britton | Rally Cycling |
| 2019 | Canada | James Piccoli | Elevate–KHS Pro Cycling |
| 2020– 2021 | No race due to the COVID-19 pandemic | | |
| 2022 | United States | Sean Gardner | CS Velo Racing |
| 2023 | United States | Alex Hoehn | Above and Beyond Cancer Cycling Team |
| 2024 | United States | Tyler Stites | Project Echelon Racing |
| 2025 | United States | Kieran Haug | Project Echelon Racing |
| 2026 | Brazil | Henrique Avancini | Localiza Meoo / Swift Pro Cycling |

=== Women ===
| Year | Country | Rider | Team |
|---|---|---|---|
| 1987 | United States | Nancy Shipp | |
| 1988 | United States | Jane Marshall | |
| 1989 | United States | Carolyn Donnelly | |
| 1990 | United States | Carolyn Donnelly | |
| 1991 | United States | Laura Peycke | |
| 1992 | United States | Jane Gagne | |
| 1993 | United States | Martha Wavrin | |
| 1994 | United States | Carolyn Donnelly | |
| 1995 | United States | Carolyn Donnelly | |
| 1996 | United States | Desiree Margagliano | |
| 1997 | No race | | |
| 1998 | France | Jeannie Longo | |
| 1999 | United States | Kimberly Bruckner | |
| 2000 | United States | Mari Holden | Timex |
| 2001 | Canada | Geneviève Jeanson | Rona |
| 2002 | Canada | Geneviève Jeanson | Rona |
| 2003 | Canada | Geneviève Jeanson | Rona Esker |
| 2004 | United States | Amber Neben | T-Mobile |
| 2005 | United States | Kimberly Baldwin | T-Mobile |
| 2006 | United States | Kristin Armstrong | Team Lipton |
| 2007 | United States | Mara Abbott | Webcor Builders |
| 2008 | Israel | Leah Goldstein | ValueAct Capital |
| 2009 | United States | Kristin Armstrong | Cervélo TestTeam |
| 2010 | United States | Mara Abbott | Peanut Butter & Co. Twenty12 |
| 2011 | Canada | Clara Hughes | Pactimo Cycling |
| 2012 | United States | Kristin Armstrong | Exergy Twenty12 |
| 2013 | United States | Mara Abbott | Exergy Twenty16 |
| 2014 | United States | Mara Abbott | UnitedHealthcare |
| 2015 | United States | Mara Abbott | Amy D Foundation |
| 2016 | United States | Mara Abbott | Amy D Foundation |
| 2017 | United States | Tayler Wiles | UnitedHealthcare |
| 2018 | United States | Katie Hall | UnitedHealthcare |
| 2019 | Australia | Brodie Chapman | Tibco–Silicon Valley Bank |
| 2020– 2021 | No race due to the COVID-19 pandemic | | |
| 2022 | United States | Lauren De Crescenzo | Cinch Rise |
| 2023 | United States | Austin Killips | Amy D Foundation |
| 2024 | United States | Lauren Stephens | Cynisca Cycling |
| 2025 | United States | Lauren Stephens | Aegis Cycling |
