= Vassili Davidenko (cyclist) =

Russian cyclist

Personal information
- Full name: Vassili Alexandrovich Davidenko
- Born: 3 July 1970 (age 56): Tbilisi, Georgian SSR, Soviet Union; (now Georgia)

Cycling career
- Sport: Cycling
- Current team: Team Novo Nordisk
- Discipline: Road
- Role: Team manager; Rider (retired)
- Rider type: Sprinter

Amateur teams
- ?: USSR National Team
- 1991: Seur–Otero (stagaiare)

Professional teams
- 1993–1995: Navigare–Blue Storm
- 1996: Roslotto–ZG Mobili
- 1997: Kross–Montanari–Selle Italia
- 1999–2006: Navigators

Managerial teams
- 2007: Navigators Insurance
- 2008–: Team Type 1

Major wins
- One-day races and Classics National Road Race Championships (1996)

Vassili Alexandrovich Davidenko (born 3 July 1970 in Tbilisi) is a Russian-American former cyclist, who currently works as the team manager and Senior Vice President of Athletics for UCI ProTeam Team Novo Nordisk.

In 1999, Davidenko moved to the United States and changed to American citizenship. After retiring from cycling, he became manager of the Navigators cycling team in 2007. The following year, he became the manager of Team Type 1.

== Major results ==
1988
2nd Junior World Road Race Championships
1991
Peace Race

1st Stages 3 & 4

1992
1st Gran Premio della Liberazione
1995
1st Stage 10 Tour DuPont
1996
1st National Road Race Championships
1st Stage 1 Tour de Pologne
1997
6th Overall Tirreno–Adriatico
1998
1st National Cyclo-cross Championships
1999
1st Stgae 5 Cascade Classic
2nd National Road Race Championships
3rd Overall Tour de Toona

1st Stage 5

2000
Tour de Beauce

1st Stages 1, 2 & 4b

2nd Overall Tour de Toona
2001
1st Stage 2 Sea Otter Classic
1st Stage 6 Giro d'Abruzzo
2nd Overall Tour de Toona

1st Stages 2 & 4

3rd Clarendon Cup
2002
1st Clarendon Cup
2nd Grand Prix de Rennes
2003
1st Stage 5b Tour de Beauce
2004
3rd CSC Invitational
2005
1st Stage 4b Tour de Beauce
