= 1999 World Juniors Track Cycling Championships =

- Venue: Athens, Greece
- Date: August 1999

The 1999 World Juniors Track Cycling Championships were the 25th annual Junior World Championships for track cycling held in Athens, Greece in August 1999.

The Championships had six events for men (sprint, points race, individual pursuit, team pursuit, 1 kilometre time trial and team sprint) and four for women (sprint, individual pursuit, 500 metre time trial and points race).

== Events ==
Event	Gold	Silver	Bronze
Men's Events
Sprint	Jobie Dajka; Australia	Marco Jager; Germany	Ben Kersten; Australia
Points race	Viktor Rapinski; Belarus	David Garbelli; Italy	Tomas Vaitkus; Lithuania
Individual pursuit	Andrew Mason; Australia	Nicholas Graham; Australia	Daniel Schlegel; Germany
Team pursuit	Nicholas Graham; Kieren Cameron; Peter Dawson; Andrew Mason; Australia	Marc Altmann; Markus Fothen; Daniel Schlegel; Christian Müller; Germany	Luca Capuzzo; Filippo Pozzato; Fabio Lovato; Maurizio Biondo; Italy
Time trial	Ben Kersten; Australia	Marco Brossa; Italy	Jobie Dajka; Australia
Team sprint	Mark Renshaw; Ben Kersten; Jobie Dajka; Australia	Nikolo Marelli; Marco Brossa; Michele Benetti; Italy	Marco Jager; Peter Clemen; David Rohler; Germany

Event	Gold	Silver	Bronze
Women's Events
Sprint	Céline Nivert; France	Tamilla Abbasova; Russia	Annamaria Scafetta; Italy
Individual pursuit	Juliette Vandekerckhove; France	Katherine Bates; Australia	Rahna Demarte; Australia
Time trial	Daniela Claussnitzer; Germany	Kerrie Meares; Australia	Rahna Demarte; Australia
Points race	Nadezda Vlasova; Russia	Rochelle Gilmore; Australia	Juliette Vandekerckhove; France

== Medal table ==
* Host nation (Greece)

Rank	Nation	Gold	Silver	Bronze	Total
1	Australia (AUS)	5	4	4	13
2	France (FRA)	2	0	1	3
3	Germany (GER)	1	2	2	5
4	Russia (RUS)	1	1	0	2
5	Belarus (BLR)	1	0	0	1
6	Italy (ITA)	0	3	2	5
7	Lithuania (LTU)	0	0	1	1
Totals (7 entries)		10	10	10	30
