= Leece (surname) =

Leece is a surname. Notable people with the surname include:

- Stephen Leece (born 1991), American professional racing cyclist
- Terry Leece (born 1957), Australian field hockey player
