= Cascade Cycling Classic =

Bicycle road race in Oregon, United States

Coordinates: 45.533°N 122.706°W

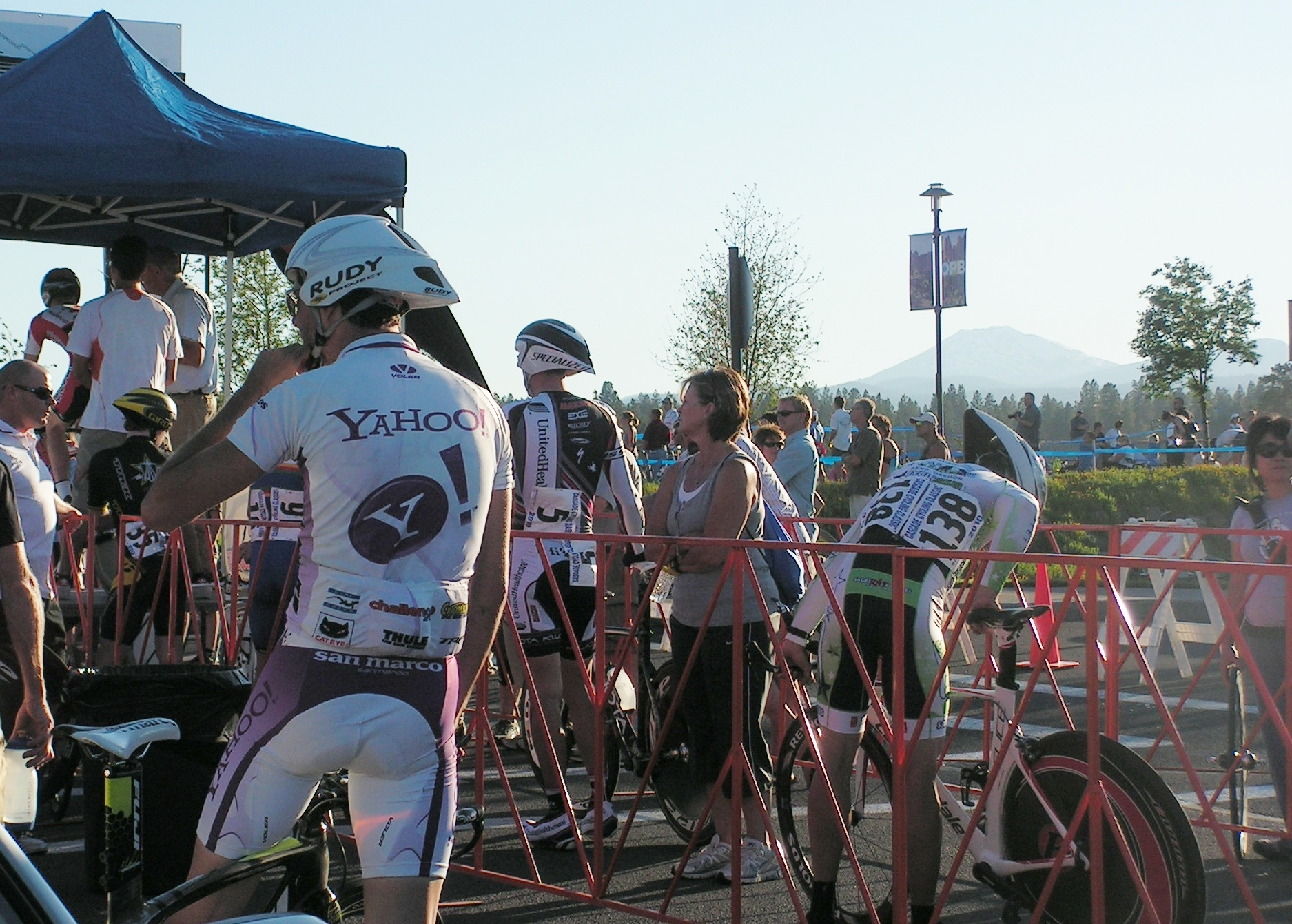
2010 Prologue ITT starting line, with Cascade Range in background

The Cascade Cycling Classic was the longest running elite road bicycle racing stage race in the United States (1980–2019), with 2018 being the only year the race was not held. The race was held again in 2019, but then canceled in 2020 due to the COVID-19 pandemic.

The race took place in the Central Oregon region and was based in Bend, Oregon. It was a regular fixture for most of North America's top cyclists and teams. Owned and managed by the Cascade Cycling Classic Youth Foundation, former pro cyclist and two-time national road champion Bart Bowen was both the foundation's executive director and the classic's race director. Bowen won the CCC in 1993.

== Past winners ==
=== Elite men ===
- 2019 : Travis McCabe (USA), Floyd's Pro Cycling
- 2018 : Race canceled
- 2017 : Robin Carpenter (USA), Holowesko Citadel Racing Team
- 2016 : Robin Carpenter (USA), Holowesko Citadel Racing Team
- 2015 : Dion Smith (NZL), Hincapie Racing Team
- 2014 : Serghei Țvetcov (ROU), Jelly Belly–Maxxis
- 2013 : Serghei Țvetcov (MDA), Jelly Belly–Kenda
- 2012 : Francisco Mancebo (ESP), Competitive Cyclist Racing Team
- 2011 : Francisco Mancebo (ESP), Realcyclist.com Cycling Team
- 2010 : Rory Sutherland (AUS), UnitedHealthcare–Maxxis
- 2009 : Óscar Sevilla (ESP), Rock Racing
- 2008 : Levi Leipheimer (USA), Astana
- 2007 : Phil Zajicek (USA), Navigators Insurance Cycling Team
- 2006 : Chris Wherry (USA), Toyota–United Pro Cycling Team
- 2005 : Scott Moninger (USA), HealthNet–Maxxis
- 2004 : Mike Creed (USA), U.S. Postal Service
- 2003 : Tom Danielson (USA), Saturn Cycling Team
- 2002 : Chris Wherry (USA), Mercury
- 2001 : Scott Moninger (USA), Mercury–Viatel
- 2000 : Scott Moninger (USA), Mercury–Viatel
- 1999 : Scott Moninger (USA), Mercury
- 1998 : Lance Armstrong (USA), U.S. Postal Service
- 1997 : Jonathan Vaughters (USA), Comptel
- 1996 : Marty Jemison (USA), Subaru–Montgomery
- 1995 : Michael Engleman (USA), Team Shaklee
- 1994 : Michael Engleman (USA), Coors Light–Serotta
- 1993 : Bart Bowen (USA), Subaru–Montgomery
- 1992 : Cezary Zamana (POL), Subaru–Montgomery
- 1991 : Greg Oravetz (USA), Coors Light
- 1990 : Mike Englemann (USA), Alpine
- 1989 : Mike Carter (USA), Wheaties–Schwinn
- 1988 : Todd Gogulski (USA)
- 1987 : Brian Walton (USA)
- 1986 : Alan McCormack (cyclist) (USA)
- 1985 : David Zimbelman (USA)
- 1984 : Dale Stetina (USA)
- 1983 : Dale Stetina (USA)
- 1982 : Alexi Grewal (USA)
- 1981 : Mark Cahn (USA)
- 1980 : Ron Hayman (CAN)

=== Elite women ===
- 2019 : Emma Grant (GBR), Sho-Air Twenty20
- 2018 : Race canceled
- 2017 : Allie Dragoo (USA), Sho-Air Twenty20
- 2016 : Tara Whitten (CAN), The Cyclery–Opus
- 2015 : Andrea Dvorak (USA), Twenty16 p/b Sho-Air
- 2014 : Lauren Stephens (USA), Team TIBCO–To The Top
- 2013 : Kristin McGrath (USA), Exergy Twenty16
- 2012 : Alison Powers (USA), Now & Novartis for MS
- 2011 : Janel Holcomb (USA), Colavita/Forno d'Asolo
- 2010 : Mara Abbott (USA), Peanut Butter & Co./Twenty12
- 2009 : Evelyn Stevens (USA). Webcor Builders
- 2008 : Kristin Armstrong (USA), Cervélo–Lifeforce Pro Cycling Team
- 2007 : Women's race was postponed
- 2006 : Kristen Lasasso (USA), Team Lipton
- 2005 : Kristin Armstrong (USA) T-Mobile
- 2004 : Christine Thorburn (USA) Webcor Builders
- 2003 : Lyne Bessette (CAN), Saturn
- 2002 : Kimberly Bruckner (USA), Saturn
- 2001 : Amber Neben (USA)
- 2000 : Jessica Phillips (USA)
- 1999 : Stacey Peters (USA)
- 1991–98 : No women's race
- 1990 : Sally Zack (USA)
- 1989 : Cathy Hart (AUS)
- 1988 : Phyllis Hines (USA)
- 1987 : Alison Sydor (CAN)
- 1986 : Robin Sewell (USA)
