= Michael Tung =

Trinidad racing cyclist (born 1990)

Personal information
- Born: March 19, 1990 (age 36) Trinidad and Tobago
- Height: 1.78 m (5 ft 10 in)
- Weight: 70 kg (150 lb)

Cycling career
- Sport: Cycling
- Disciplines: Track & road
- Role: Rider
- Rider type: Sprinter

Major wins
- Tour of Trinidad, Tour de Cafe, National Championships

Michael Tung (born 19 March 1990) is a Trinidad racing cyclist. He started swimming at the age of fifteen and made his first swimming national record a couple months after. He excelled in swimming, coming second in the 100M free at Marlins International Open and coming first overall in several High School Invitational competitions. From there he went into the sport of triathlon. Ranking first in triathlon in his country at the age of 16, Michael managed to be invited to compete in the 2006 ITU World Championships in Lausane, Switzerland.

Michael's passion for cycling made him pursue the sport on a higher level. He excelled immediately, as he was able to come second and third in the majority of races he participated in. In 2007, Michael was able to win the first Tour of Trinidad (a three-day race which covers an average 100 km per day) and was able to become the 2008 National Keirin Champion.

== Career highlights ==
| Year | Place | Stage | Race | |
|---|---|---|---|---|
| 1996 | 2nd | | 50 in Specialist Maths | |
| 1996 | 2007 | 1st | | Easter Grand Prix |
| 1996 | 2007 | 1st | | Tobago Invitational |
| 1996 | 2007 | 1st | 3 | Tour de Cafe Stage Race |
| 1996 | 2007 | 2nd | | National Road Championships |
| 2nd | 2007 | 3 | Tour de San Fernando | |
| 4th | 2007 | | Caribbean Cycling Championships | |
| 2nd | 2007 | | South Hampton Cycling Classic | |
| 1st | 2007 | 1 | International Cycling Classic | |
| 2nd | 2007 | 2 | International Cycling Classic | |
| 5th | 2007 | 4 | International Cycling Classic | |
| 1st | 2007 | Overall | Tour of Trinidad | |
| 2008 | 8th | | Panamerican Championships (Ecuador) | |
| 2008 | 1st | 1 | Tour de Cafe | |
| 2008 | 1st | 2 | Tour de Cafe | |
| 2008 | 1st | 3 | Tour de Cafe | |
| 2008 | 1st | Overall | Tour de Cafe | |
| 2008 | 1st | | Palo Seco International Games | |
| 2008 | 1st | | West Indies vs. The World | |
| 2008 | 1st | Scratch race | West Indies vs. The World | |
| 2008 | 1st | Four-Lap Event | West Indies vs. The World | |
| 2008 | 1st | Keirin | West Indies vs. The World | |
| 2008 | 1st | Six-Lap Event | West Indies vs. The World | |

== Sources ==
- http://autobus.cyclingnews.com/road.php?id=road/2006/sep06/tobago06
- http://www.newsday.co.tt/sport/0,83216.html
- http://www.newsday.co.tt/sport/0,66537.html
- http://www.newsday.co.tt/sport/0,95041.html
- http://www.newsday.co.tt/sport/0,79597.html
- http://guardian.co.tt/sports/other-sports/2009/02/01/2009-cycling-season-opens
- https://web.archive.org/web/20090129205347/http://ttcyclingfederation.com/
- http://www.ttcyclingfederation.com/results/2007-09-15-CriteriumChamps.htm
- http://www.odesseytiming.com/RESULTS07/07-10-04-Tobago-Cycling-Classic/res-stg2-div2.htm
- http://www.triathlon.org/?call=TVRFeQ==&id=Nzc2Mg==&keep=sh
- https://www.amazon.it/Trinidad-Tobago-Cyclists-Olympic-Michael/dp/images/1158673310
