= Valery Kobzarenko =

Ukrainian cyclist

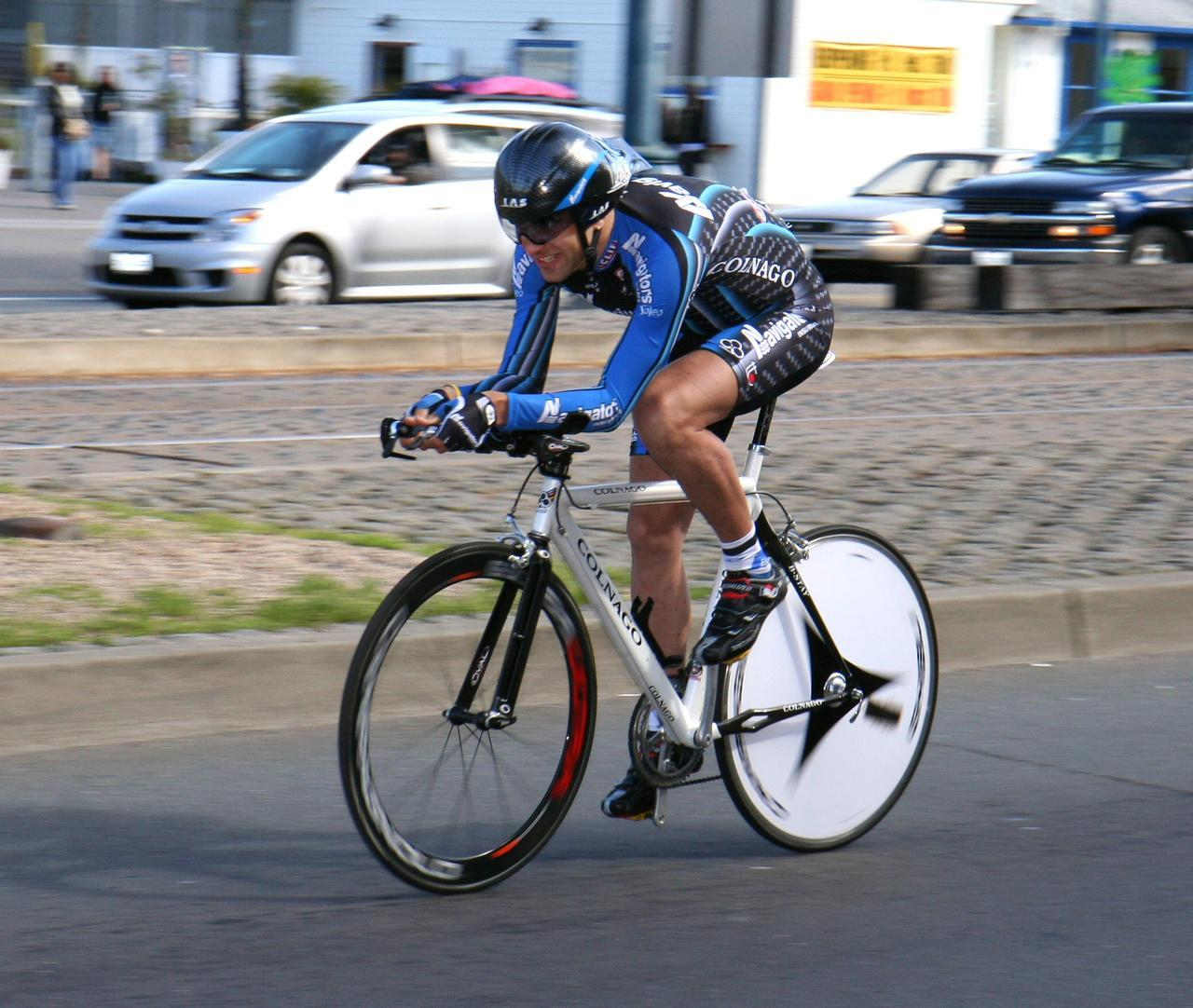
- Kobzarenko at the 2007 Tour of California

Personal information
- Full name: Valery Kobzarenko
- Born: 5 February 1977 (age 49) Kyiv, Ukraine

Cycling career
- Sport: Cycling
- Current team: Retired
- Discipline: Road
- Role: Rider

Amateur teams
- 2001: Cantina Tollo–Acqua & Sapone (stagiaire)
- 2002: Aran Cucine Cantina Tollo
- 2003: Team Maestro-Nella

Professional teams
- 2004–2005: Acqua & Sapone
- 2006–2007: Navigators Insurance
- 2008–2011: Team Type 1
- 2012: Uzbekistan Suren Team
- 2013: Kolss Cycling Team

Valery Kobzarenko (born 5 February 1977 in Kiev, Ukraine) is a Ukrainian former professional track and road bicycle racer. He turned professional in 2004 with Acqua & Sapone and retired at the end of the 2013 season.

== Major results ==
1996
1st Tour de Ribas
1997
2nd Tour de Ribas
1998
7th Overall Okolo Slovenska
1999
6th Overall Tour de Luxembourg
2000
3rd Road race, National Road Championships
2003
3rd Overall Paths of King Nikola
6th Overall Ringerike GP
7th Overall Tour of Hellas
7th GP Capodarco
9th Gran Premio San Giuseppe
2006
1st Overall Tour de Beauce

1st Stage 1

6th Hel van het Mergelland
7th Philadelphia International Championship
2007
7th Overall Tour of Missouri
8th Overall Tour of Ireland
10th U.S. Cycling Open
2008
4th Overall Tour de Beauce
9th Univest Grand Prix
2010
2nd Overall Tour du Maroc
5th Overall Tour de Beauce
2013
1st Prologue Romanian Cycling Tour
