= Viktor Rapinski =

Personal information
- Born: 17 June 1981 (age 45)

Cycling career
- Sport: Cycling
- Current team: Retired
- Discipline: Road
- Role: Rider

Professional teams
- 2002–2003: Saturn
- 2004: Navigators
- 2005: Phonak
- 2006: Colavita–Sutter Home
- 2007: Navigators

Viktor Rapinski (born 17 June 1981) is a former Belarusian cyclist.

== Palmares ==
1999
National Time Trial Champion
2000
National Time Trial Champion
2001
National Time Trial Champion
2002
1st International Cycling Classic

1st stages 1, 3, 5, 9 and 14

2003
1st Fitchburg Longsjo Classic
1st International Cycling Classic

1st stages 9 and 12

2nd Nature Valley Grand Prix

1st stage 4

2nd CSC Invitational
2nd Vuelta de Bisbee

1st stage 2 (TT)

3rd Wachovia Classic
2004
1st stage 5 Tour of Turkey
1st stage 2 Fitchburg Longsjo Classic
1st stages 1, 4 and 9 Tour of Qinghai Lake
2005
2nd National Time Trial Championship
