= Blue Sky Hill Climb =

Annual bicycle race held near Idaho Springs, Colorado, U.S.

Bob Cook Memorial Blue Sky Hill Climb
Race details
- Date: July
- Region: Colorado, USA
- English name: Bob Cook Memorial Blue Sky Hill Climb
- Nickname: Mt. Evans Hillclimb
- Discipline: Road race
- Type: One-day race

History
- First edition: 1962; 64 years ago
- Editions: 54
- First winner: Stuart Baillie and Adolph Weller (tie)
- Most wins: Scott Moninger (USA) (6 times)

The Bob Cook Memorial Blue Sky Hill Climb or Mount Evans Hill Climb is a bicycle race situated on Mount Blue Sky near Idaho Springs, Colorado. Begun in 1962, the race has been held every year since except for three cancellations. In 1981, it was renamed in honor of five-time race winner Bob Cook, who died of cancer at the age of 23. The race is 27.4 miles (44.1 kilometers) in length and ascends 6,590 feet (2,010 m).

The race takes place on the highest paved road in the United States, starting at an altitude of 7,540 feet (2,298 meters) and terminating at 14,130 feet (4,306 meters), 130 feet (39 meters) below Mount Blue Sky's summit. Due to the altitude, the event is sometimes marked by inclement weather.

Over the years, the race has attracted significant professional riders. Riders come from all over the United States and in the past the race has had riders from France, Switzerland, Germany, and Australia compete. The age range of the participants is from nine to eighty-five years. The race is also supported by volunteers from the Colorado cycling community who help marshal, drive support, officiate and work the picnic. The event includes categories for all levels of racing and encourages riders of all abilities. Between six hundred and a thousand riders compete each year in a number of categories.

In 2024, the name of the race changed to Blue Sky Hill Climb, reflecting the name change of Mount Evans to Mount Blue Sky. The race did not occur in 2025 due to road construction.

== Course records ==
Bob Cook held the course record from 1975–1980. The first three years he held the record he was a junior. The present men's record is held by Tom Danielson, set in 2004 with a time of 1:41:20. The women's course record is held by Jeannie Longo of France at 1:59:19.

== Canceled years ==
The race was canceled five times: twice due to snow and once when the race director was in Atlanta at the 1996 Summer Olympics, once for COVID and the fifth for construction.

== List of winners ==
Women competed in the race beginning in 1976. The winners of the race are:

Year	Men's Winner	Time	Women's Winner	Time
1962	Stuart Baillie/Adolph Weller	2:28 (Note: New record time)		
1963	Stuart Baillie	2:24		
1964	Stuart Baillie	2:08:07		
1965	Michael Hiltner	2:09:55		
1966	Stuart Baillie	2:14		
1967	(Note: Race was held, but no results are available.)			
1968	Mike Dennis	N/A		
1969	Stan Justice	2:19:23		
1970	Kalman Halasi	2:22:49		
1971	Kalman Halasi	2:14:35		
1972	Bob Poling	2:11:41		
1973	Jack Janelle	2:05:32		
1974	Jack Janelle	2:05:09		
1975	Bob Cook	2:02:55		
1976	Bob Cook	1:57:50	Robin Deily	2:44:58
1977	Bob Cook	1:55:43		
1978	Bob Cook	1:54:27	Margaret Nettles	1:18:44 (Note: Race finished at Echo Lake.)
1979	(Note: Race not held (snow).)			
1980	Bob Cook	1:54:55	Margaret Nettles	2:41:10
1981	Alexi Grewal	1:57:36	Martha Stafford	2:29:54
1982	Don Spence	1:58:12	Jan DeYoung	2:28:33
1983	Todd Gogulski	1:53:43	Ann Chernoff	2:24:37
1984	Alexi Grewal	1:47:51	Denise Yamagishi	2:23:45
1985	Ned Overend	1:49:53	Barb Dolan	2:15:58
1986	Ned Overend	1:49:22	Catherine Porter	2:22:58
1987	Todd Gogulski	1:54:07	Vanessa Brines	2:26:03
1988	Tom Resh	1:51:56	Darien Raistrick	2:19:46
1989				
1990	Alexi Grewal	1:46:29	Darien Raistrick	2:13:59
1991	Mike Engleman	1:51:41	Darien Raistrick	2:23:10
1992	Mike Engleman	1:45:30	Linda Brenneman	2:15;24
1993	Mike Engleman	1:56:57	Jan Bolland	2:32:21
1994	Mike Engleman	1:50:35	Eve Stephenson	2:25:43
1995	Mike Engleman	1:46:32	Linda Jackson	2:13:28
1996	(Note: Race not held (organizer at 1996 Olympic Games).)			
1997	Jonathan Vaughters	1:53:54 (Note: Mat Anand, a Canadian National Team member was the first across the line, but was relegated to second place for ‘hooking’ Jonathan Vaughters in the final sprint.)	Julie Hudetz	2:18:22
1998	Scott Moninger	1:52:16	Jeannie Longo	1:59:19 (Note: Current Record)
1999	Jonathan Vaughters		Emily Robbins	2:09:58
2000	Scott Moninger	1:49:42	Kimberly Bruckner	2:09:00
2001	Scott Moninger	1:46:56	Karen Bockel	2:22:15
2002	Scott Moninger	1:50:20	Kimberly Bruckner	2:05:31
2003	Jonathan Vaughters	1:49:29	Allison Lusby	2:09:29
2004	Tom Danielson	1:41:20 (Note: Current Record)	Ann Trombley	2:19:03
2005	Scott Moninger	1:52:50	Mara Abbott	2:20:10
2006	Scott Moninger	1:49:52	Mara Abbott	2:11:55
2007	Tom Danielson	1:43:04	Michelle Steiner	2:22:04
2008	Kevin Nicol	1:53:21	Jeannie Longo	2:10:10
2009	Tom Danielson	1:42:09	Jennifer Slawta	2:15:58
2010	Peter Stetina	1:50:20	Tammy Jacques-Grewal	2:15:07
2011	LeRoy Popowski	1:57:36	Tammy Jacques-Grewal	2:13:24
2012	LeRoy Popowski	1:51:02	Tammy Jacques-Grewal	2:08:08
2013	Christopher Carr	1:57:16	Annie Toth	2:19:30
2014	Fortunato Ferrara	1:51:22	Mara Abbott	2:14:12
2015	Lachlan Morton	1:48:05	Mara Abbott	2:19:16
2016	Chris Butler	1:50:19	Annie Toth	2:17:40
2017	Chad Haga	1:43:39	Mara Abbott	2:16:35
2018	Gregory Daniel	1:49:51	Flavia Oliviera	2:16:26
2019	Keegan Swirbul	1:43:53	Annie Toth	2:16:05
2020	COVID Cancelation			
2021	Emerson Oronte	1:54:08	Aimee Vassee	2:25:28
2022	Lachlan Morton	1:52:22	Kyleigh Spearing	2:27:32
2023	Erik Levinsohn	1:53:18	Ashley Frye	2:27:05
2024	Ethan Dunham	1:54:09	Isnaraissa Moir	2:24:30
2025	Construction Cancelation			
2026	John Keller	1:47:50	Michelle Hummel	2:25:21
