= Oleg Grishkin =

Russian cyclist

Personal information
- Born: 10 February 1975 (age 51) Moscow, Russia

Cycling career
- Sport: Cycling
- Current team: Retired
- Discipline: Road
- Role: Rider

Professional teams
- 1999: Alessio–Bianchi
- 2001–2007: Navigators

Oleg Grischkin (born 10 February 1975 in Moscow) is a former Russian racing cyclist.

== Palmares ==
1997
1st Overall Five Rings of Moscow
1998
1st Trofeo Città di San Vendemiano
2002
1st National Road Race Championships
1st Tallinn-Tartu GP
2nd Reading Classic
2003
1st Grand Prix de Rennes
1st Overall Tour of South China Sea

1st Stages 1, 4, 5 & 6

1st Stage 2 Tour de Beauce
2nd Reading Classic
2007
1st Stage 4b Tour de Beauce
3rd Reading Classic
