= Bart Bowen =

American cyclist

Personal information
- Born: April 22, 1967 (age 59) Austin, Texas, U.S.

Cycling career
- Sport: Cycling
- Current team: Retired
- Discipline: Road
- Role: Rider

Professional teams
- 1990: Alpine–Colorado
- 1991–1994: Subaru–Montgomery
- 1995–2000: Saturn Cycling Team

Major wins
- National Road Race Championships (1992, 1997)

Bart Bowen (born April 22, 1967 in Austin, Texas) is an American former cyclist. Professional from 1990 to 2000, he was most notably the National Road Champion in 1992 and 1997. He also won the Herald Sun Tour in 1992 and the Tour of Japan in 1997. Bowen participated six times at the World Road Championships with the American team.

In the 1993 Tour DuPont he was the second to fall in a twenty-man crash.

Today he trains other racers.

== Major results ==
1992
1st Road race, National Road Championships
1st Overall Herald Sun Tour
1st Philadelphia International Championship
2nd Japan Cup
3rd Giro dell'Etna
1993
1st Overall Cascade Cycling Classic
2nd Overall Redlands Bicycle Classic
1994
1st Stage 1 Tour of Willamette
1995
1st Stage 2 West Virginia Classic
2nd Lancaster Classic
3rd Overall Cascade Cycling Classic
1996
1st Stages 14 & 17 International Cycling Classic
1997
1st Road race, National Road Championships
1st Overall Tour of Japan

1st Stage 1

1st Overall Tour of the Gila
1st Stage 4 Cascade Cycling Classic
1998
1st Stage 4 & 6 Cascade Cycling Classic
1999
1st Fitchburg Longsjo Classic
2000
2nd National Cyclo-cross Championships
