= Todd Gogulski =

American cycling commentator and road racer

Personal information
- Born: 1962 (age 63–64) Grand Rapids, Michigan, U.S.

Cycling career
- Sport: Cycling
- Discipline: Road racing
- Role: Rider

Amateur teams
- 1981: Gardenschwartz Sports
- 1982: Strings 'n Spokes

Professional teams
- 1983-1986: Ten Speed Drive
- 1987: Lowenbrau
- 1988: Crest
- 1989-1990: Coors Light
- 1991-1992: Subaru Montgomery
- ?: U.S. National Cycling Team

Todd Gogulski (born 1962 in Grand Rapids) is an American former cycling TV commentator for NBC Universal Sports and Versus and a former professional road racer.

== Early life and early career ==
He was born in Grand Rapids, Michigan, in 1962, but grew up in northern California and Santa Fe, New Mexico, where he first raced his bike in the Santa Fe Hill Climb organized and promoted by Geoff Passo. After racing locally for Gardenschwartz Sports (1981) and Strings ‘n Spokes (1982), he joined Ten Speed Drive (1983–86), for whom he won the National Team Time Trial Championship in 1986 (with Kent Bostick, Carl Maxon, and Andy Paulin).

== Later career ==
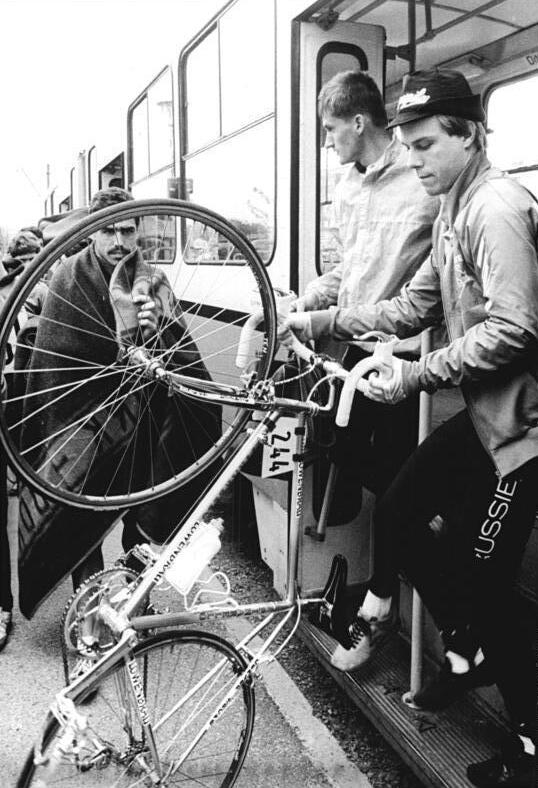

Subsequently, he raced for four years under teams directed by Len Pettyjohn, with sponsors Lowenbrau (1987), Crest (1988), and the powerhouse American squad Coors Light (1989–90), where he was teammates with Greg LeMond. In 1991, he joined Subaru Montgomery, directed by Eddie Borysewicz, where he was teammates with Lance Armstrong; Subaru Montgomery later became the U.S. Postal Team. Following several seasons of injuries and declining results, he retired from racing in 1992.

He raced for the US National Team in Australia, Austria, Brazil, Czechoslovakia, East Germany, France, Germany, Indonesia, Italy, Japan, Korea, Luxembourg, Mexico, Morocco, Poland, Puerto Rico, and Venezuela. In 1985, he represented the US at the amateur Giro d'Italia and in 1987 at the Peace Race in Eastern Europe.

In the late 1990s, after a hiatus from the sport, he worked in PR for a start-up bicycle tire company, and then shifted into promotions for the Saturn Cycling Team, announcing their Cyberbike events. In 2006, he began doing stage announcing for bicycle races, with ongoing commenting at Philly Week, Redlands, the National Championships, the Tour of Utah, and numerous others.

== Television ==
In 2009, he joined the NBC Universal Sports cycling TV commentary team with Steve Schlanger, with whom he covered the Tour of the Basque Country, the Giro d'Italia, the Vuelta a España, the World Road Championships, Milan–San Remo, and others. For 2011, he joined the Versus Tour de France TV broadcasting team alongside Bob Roll, Phil Liggett, Paul Sherwen, and Liam McHugh. He currently lives in Boulder, Co.

== Palmarès ==
Gogulski's results include:

1982 (Strings ‘n Spokes):

- 1st New Mexico State Championships, Road Race, Time Trial, and Cyclocross
- 1st Juarez Inaugural Criterium, Juarez, Mexico

1983 (Ten Speed Drive):

- 1st Mt. Evans Hill Climb, Category 3, Mt. Evans, CO

1984 (Ten Speed Drive):

- 2nd, National Road Championship, Team Time Trial
- 1st Team Time Trial, US National Team, Commonwealth Bank Classic/Tour of Australia (1st Team GC)
- 1st Santa Fe Hill Climb, Santa Fe, NM
- 1st Palo Alto Criterium, CA

1985 (Ten Speed Drive)

- US National A Team Member (Giro d'Italia)
- 1st Tour of Morocco Prologue (2nd Road Race)
- 4th GC Tour of Asia, Korea & Japan
- 20th Coors International Bicycle Classic, CO
- 2nd Mount Evans Hill Climb, Mt. Evans, CO
- 1st Azusa Hill Climb, Azusa, CA
- 1st Santa Fe Hill Climb, Santa Fe, NM

1986 (Ten Speed Drive)

- National Champion, Team Time Trial
- US National A Team Member (Giro de la Libarazioni in Italy; Giro de las Regioni, Italy)
- 3rd National Prestige Classic Standings
- US World’s Team Captain at the World Road Race Championships
- 18th Amateur World Road Race Championship, Colorado Springs, CO, Top US Amateur
- 18th GC Coors International Bicycle Classic, CA, NV, CO, Top US Amateur (3rd Vail to Copper Mountain Road Race, 8th Niwot Time Trial)
- 1st Tour of Nevada City Bicycle Classic
- 1st Sandia Crest Climb, Albuquerque, NM
- 1st Team Time Trial, Vulcan Tour, Redding, CA
- 1st Rocky Mountain News Classic, Castle Pines Road Race, Denver, CO
- 7th 7 Eleven Cup Serios

1987 (Lowenbrau)

- US World Championship Team Captain
- US Pan American Games Team Captain
- US National A Team Member (Peace Race in East Germany, Czechoslovakia and Poland; Circuit des Mines in France)
- 2nd in the National Prestige Classic Rankings
- 4th Pan American Games Road Race, Indianapolis, IN
- 1st GC Pan American Games Selection, Rocky Mountain News Classic, Denver, CO
- 1st GC Munsingwear Classic, World Championship Trials, Crested Butte, CO (1st Prologue Time Trial, 1st Black Canyon Road Race)
- 7th National Road Championship
- 5th Road Race, Austrian Stage Race (US National Team)
- 1st Mount Evans/Bob Cook Memorial Hill Climb, Mt. Evans, CO
- 1st GC Casper Classic Stage Race, Casper, WY (1st Time Trial, 2nd Hill Climb, 2nd Road Race)
- 1st GC Steamboat Stage Race, Steamboat Springs, CO
- 1st Battle at the Brewery, Superweek, Milwaukee, WI
- 1st Colorado State Road Championship
- 3rd Overall Tour of Brazil, Winner of Mountains Competition, (1st Road Race, 1st Team Time Trial, 1st Prologue Team Time Trial, 2nd Mountains Classification)

1988 (Crest)

- US National A Team Member
- 1st GC Cascade Cycling Classic, Bend, OR (1st Mt. Bachelor Road Race, 1st Mountains Classification)
- 1st Nevada City Bicycle Classic
- 1st GC Mammoth Cycling Classic, Mammoth, CA (1st Prologue Time Trial, 1st Altitude 9000 Road Race)
- 2nd GC Mt. Hood Classic Omnium (1st Mt. Hood Loop Road Race, 1st Time Trial)
- 1st Team Time Trial and Team GC, Redlands Bicycle Classic, Redlands, CA
- 15th Overall Coors International Bicycle Classic
- 2nd Sonoma County Coastal Road Race, Coors Classic, Santa Rosa, CA
- 5th Vail Criterium, Vail, CO
- Most Aggressive Rider, Coors Classic, Aspen, CO

1989 (Coors Light)

- 1st Redlands Bicycle Classic, Criterium, Team Time Trial, Team GC, Redlands, CA
- 1st, Cascade Cycling Classic, Bend, OR, Santiam-McKenzie Road Race (6th GC)
- 1st St. Louis Road Race, St. Louis, MO
- 1st GC Oklahoma City Retailers Classic, Oklahoma City, OK (1st Criterium, 3rd Road Race)

1990 (Coors Light)

- 3rd, Tour de Trump, Charlottesville to Winchester Road Race
- 10th, US Professional Criterium Championship, Washington, DC
- 1st Altitude 9000 Road Race, Mammoth Cycling Classic, Mammoth, CA (3rd GC)

1991 (Subaru Montgomery)

- King of the Mountain, Manayunk Wall, Corestates U.S. Pro Road Championship, Philadelphia, PA
- 1st Stage One, Tour of Indonesia
- 1st Team GC, Settimana Bergamasca, Italy
- 2nd Team GC, Tour of Luxembourg
