= Connie Meijer =

Dutch cyclist (1963–1988)

- Connie Meijer in 1988

Personal information
- Born: 5 February 1963 Vlaardingen, the Netherlands
- Died: 17 August 1988 (aged 25) Naaldwijk, the Netherlands

Sport
- Sport: Cycling
Medal record
Representing the Netherlands
UCI Road World Championships
Bronze medal – third place	1987 Villach	Road race

Connie Meijer (5 February 1963 – 17 August 1988) was a Dutch cyclist who won a bronze medal in the road race at the 1987 UCI Road World Championships. She won a national title in this event in 1984, as well as individual stages of the Tour of Norway in 1987 and 1988.

On 17 August 1988, while competing in a criterium in Naaldwijk, she complained of severe nausea and died on the way to the hospital. Initial reports stated that she died of a brain hemorrhage. However, later reports stated that she died of a heart attack, likely caused by a neglected flu.

In her memory, the Connie Meijer Trofee was created, for which women compete in Parel van de Veluwe (Meijer herself won this race in 1988).
