= David Mann (cyclist) =

British cyclist

Personal information
- Born: 26 June 1962 (age 64) Bradford, Great Britain

Cycling career
- Sport: Cycling
- Discipline: Road
- Role: Rider

Professional teams
- 1986–1989: Raleigh - Weinmann
- 1990: Airmarshall - Kirk
- 1991–1994: Coors Light
- 1995: Saab - Giordana

David Mann (born 26 June 1962) is a former British professional racing cyclist. He took part in the 1987 UCI Road World Championships.

== Major results ==
1987
3rd Overall GP Leeds
3rd Norwich Spring Classic
1988
3rd Grand Prix de Rennes
1989
10th Dwars door Vlaanderen
1990
1st Sprints classification Tour of Britain
1992
1st Stage 2 Tour DuPont
6th Overall Casper Classic

1st Stages 1 and 3 (TTT)

1993
1st Overall Herald Sun Tour

1st Stages 1 & 8
