= Alexi Grewal =

American cyclist (born 1960)

Personal information
- Full name: Alexi Grewal
- Born: September 8, 1960 (age 66) Aspen, Colorado, United States

Cycling career
- Sport: Cycling
- Current team: Retired
- Discipline: Road
- Role: Rider

Professional teams
- 1985: Panasonic–Raleigh
- 1986: 7-Eleven
- 1987: RMO–Cycles Méral–Mavic
- 1988: Crest
- 1989–1993: Coors Light–ADR
Medal record
Men's road cycling
Representing United States
Olympic Games
Gold medal – first place	1984 Los Angeles	Individual road race

Alexi Singh Grewal (born September 8, 1960) is an American Olympic gold medalist and former professional road racing cyclist. At the 1984 Summer Olympics in Los Angeles, Grewal became the first American man to win an Olympic gold medal in road cycling. He has two brothers, Rishi and Ranjeet, who were also top American cyclists, especially in mountain bike racing.

== Biography ==
The United States Bicycling Hall of Fame gave the following description of his Los Angeles gold medal ride: "With an estimated crowd of 300,000 lining the 190.2-kilometer route, Grewal edged Canadian Steve Bauer to claim the gold medal in the men's road race, breaking away from the field with 20 kilometers remaining and opening up a 24-second lead after 11 of 12 laps and then being caught by Bauer with 10 kilometers left, setting up a dramatic final-lap showdown. This scene, replayed many times since, is one of the most emotional Olympic victories of the Modern Games."

After winning Olympic gold, Grewal turned professional and signed with the Panasonic team and later with the 7-Eleven Cycling Team. According to teammate Bob Roll, Grewal was the captain of the 1986 7-Eleven team through the spring. Sometime later in 1986, he was dropped by the team after spitting on a CBS camera man who got too close. He raced for the United States–based Coors Light pro team from 1989 to 1993. He became well known in the cycling community as an extraordinarily talented, but emotionally volatile rider.

After retiring from professional cycling Grewal moved to Colorado with his family. Grewal began making hand-hewn and crafted furniture and architectural features out of native hardwoods after his cycling days were over. He lost part of his fingers in an accident involving a saw. A bicycle frame manufacturer in Denver, Colorado, the Clark-Kent company, made a special road racing frame, the "AX-1", to Grewal's specifications. This steel frame featured an unusual bent seat tube with unorthodox frame angles.

In 2004, Grewal was elected to the United States Bicycling Hall of Fame.

On April 3, 2008, VeloNews published an essay by Grewal on his personal use (and the overall prevalence) of doping in cycling during his career, both in his amateur and professional days.

In 2009, and again 2013, Alexi unsuccessfully ran for mayor of Loveland, Colorado.

On September 25, 2010, VeloNews announced that Grewal would be making a comeback at age 50, targeting the Quiznos Pro Challenge in Colorado in 2011. However, he was not on the start list and did not complete this race. He instead turned his focus to non-professional gravel and gran fondo rides, such as the Snowmass-Aspen Gran Fondo Italia, finishing fourth out of 125 riders in one race.

== Major results ==
1981
1st Mt. Evans Hill Climb (1:57:36)
2nd Overall Vuelta Ciclista de Chile
1982
1st Overall Cascade Cycling Classic
2nd Overall Vuelta Ciclista de Chile

1st Stages 7 & 8

1983
1st Stage 8a Tour de l'Avenir
1st Stage 6a GP Tell
1st Stage 8 Coors Classic
1st Stage 10 Red Zinger Classic
1984
1st Road race, Summer Olympics
1st Mt. Evans Hill Climb (1:47:51)
1st Stage 8 Tour of Texas
1985
5th Overall Étoile de Bessèges
1986
3rd Overall Tour de l'Avenir

1st Stage 12

1987
1st Overall Vulcan Tour

1st Prologue

1988
1st Overall Redlands Bicycle Classic

1st Stages 3 & 4 (TTT)

1st Overall Mammoth Classic

1st Stage 2

1989
3rd Road race, National Road Championships
1990
1st Mt. Evans Hill Climb (1:46:29 – former record)
1st Overall Casper Classic

1st Stage 2

1st Stage 4 Cascade Classic
1991
4th Overall Tour DuPont
1992
1st Overall Tour de Bisbee

1st Stage 1

1st Stage 10 Tour DuPont
1993
1st Nevada City Classic
1st Stage 5 Casper Classic
