= Harm Jansen =

Dutch racing cyclist

Harm Jansen (born 8 November 1967 in Delft, South Holland) is a Dutch professional road racing cyclist. His career highlight includes winning the 2001 International Tour de Toona and USPRO National Criterium Championships.

== Career ==
1988
1st in Stage 3 OZ Wielerweekend (NED)
1st in Parel van de Veluwe (NED)
1989
1st in General Classification Ruban Granitiers Bretons (FRA)
3rd in Caraco Omloop (NED)
1990
2nd in Netherlands National Championship, Road, Amateurs, The Netherlands (NED)
3rd in Parel van de Veluwe (NED)
1992
3rd in Stage 9 Olympia's Tour, Uitgeest (NED)
1993
1st in Omloop der Kempen (NED)
1st in Stage 1 Ster van Brabant (NED)
1st in Stage 2 part a Teleflex Tour, Schijndel (NED)
1st in Stage 2 part a Olympia's Tour, Goor (NED)
2nd in Stage 4 Olympia's Tour, Valkenburg (NED)
2nd in Stage 8 Olympia's Tour, Zwolle (NED)
1994
3rd in General Classification Fresca Classic (USA)
2nd in Ster van Zwolle (NED)
1st in Stage 4 Závod Míru, Prostejov (CZE)
1995
3rd in Hel van het Mergelland (NED)
2nd in Stage 5 Geelong Bay Classic Series, Torquay (AUS)
2nd in Stage 5 Olympia's Tour, Meerssen (NED)
1997
1st in General Classification International Cycling Classic (USA)
3rd in Stage 7 Tour of Ohio, Zanesville (USA)
1st in Stage 3 Geelong Bay Classic Series, Torquay (AUS)
2nd in Stage 5 Geelong Bay Classic Series, Saint-Kilda (AUS)
2nd in General Classification Geelong Bay Classic Series (AUS)
1999
1st in Stage 15 Commonwealth Bank Classic (AUS)
1st in General Classification International Cycling Classic (USA)
3rd in USPro Ch'ship (USA)
1st in Stage 3 Rás Tailteann, Killaloe, Clare (IRL)
1st in Stage 5 Rás Tailteann, Sligo (IRL)
1st in Stage 6 Rás Tailteann, Killybegs Donegal (IRL)
1st in Stage 8 Rás Tailteann, Drogheda (IRL)
2nd in Points classification Rás Tailteann (IRL)
1st in Stage 1 Mount Buller Cup, Mansfield (AUS)
1st in Stage 2 Tour of Tasmania, St. Helens (AUS)
1st in Stage 4 Tour of Tasmania, Salamanca (AUS)
1st in Stage 4 Tour of Wellington, Masterton (NZL)
2nd in Stage 6 Tour of Wellington, Wellington (NZL)
1st in Stage 7 Tour of Wellington, Wallaceville (NZL)
2nd in Stage 1 McLane Pacific Classic, Downtown GP (USA)
2000
3rd in General Classification Sea Otter Classic (USA)
2nd in Stage 2 Ster der Beloften, Valkenburg (NED)
2nd in Santa Maria (USA)
1st in Stage 5 Tour de Beauce, St-Georges (CAN)
3rd in General Classification Dayton (USA)
1st in Syracuse, Criterium (USA)
1st in Stage 3 Killington Stage Race (USA)
3rd in General Classification Killington Stage Race (USA)
2001
1st in Stage 3 International Cycling Classic (USA)
2nd in General Classification International Cycling Classic (USA)
2nd in Stage 2 McLane Pacific Classic, Footshill Road Race (USA)
2002
2nd in Stage 1 McLane Pacific Classic, Downtown GP (USA)
1st in Stage 5 Redlands Bicycle Classic, Redlands (USA)
2003
3rd in Proving Grounds (USA)
1st in Stage 5 Vuelta Ciclista de Chile, Pichilemu (CHI)
2nd in Dominguez Hills, Criterium (USA)
1st in Stage 2 International Cycling Classic, Menasha, Wisconsin (USA)
3rd in Stage 3 International Cycling Classic, Manitowoc, Wisconsin (USA)
3rd in Stage 5 International Cycling Classic, Burlington, Wisconsin (USA)
2nd in General Classification International Cycling Classic (USA)
3rd in Stage 2 Cyclefest, Bill Bone GP (USA)
3rd in Stage 3 Cyclefest, Sunday Sizzler (USA)
2004
1st in Garrett Lemire Memorial GP (USA)
1st in Stage 2 International Cycling Classic, Otto Grunski Menasha Classic Criterium (USA)
2nd in Stage 3 International Cycling Classic, First National Bank Maritime Bay Classic (USA)
2nd in Stage 9 International Cycling Classic (USA)
1st in General Classification International Cycling Classic (USA)
2nd in General Classification Cyclefest (USA)
2005
2nd in Mothballs Criterium (USA)
2nd in Valencia Grand Prix (USA)
1st in Torrance (USA)
1st in Garrett Lemire Memorial GP (USA)
1st in Devils Punch Bowl RR (USA)
2nd in Chuck Pontius Criterium (USA)
2nd in HealthNet Barry Wolfe Grand Prix (USA)
