= TD Bank Triple Crown of Cycling =

The TD Bank Triple Crown of Cycling, formerly known as the Commerce Bank Triple Crown of Cycling, was a three-race series of road bicycle racing events held in the United States that ran from 2006-2008. The series consisted of the Lancaster Classic, the Reading Classic, and the Philadelphia International Cycling Classic, held over a week, with a race formerly held in Trenton, New Jersey. They were part of the UCI America Tour and the series winner earned a $10,000 prize.

After the 2008 edition, the Triple Crown ended and only the Philadelphia race remained. As of 2017, none of these events remain, but Reading, Pennsylvania now hosts The Reading 120, formerly the Bucks County Classic, that is part of the UCI America Tour. This Pro-Cycling racing began as the CoreStates Bank series with the US-Pro championship in Philadelphia, and two shorter races in Trenton (New Jersey National Bank), and Lancaster (Hamilton Bank). Sponsoring these three races supported the merging of these banks into the new interstate regional CoreStates Bank company.
