= Parel van de Veluwe =

Dutch one-day road cycling race

Race details
- Region: the Netherlands
- English name: Pearl of the Veluwe
- Local name(s): Women: Memorial Connie Meijer Trofee
- Discipline: Road
- Type: Road race
- Organiser: Wielervereniging De IJsselstreek
- Web site: www.parelvandeveluwe.nl

History (men)
- First edition: 1988
- Editions: 31
- Final edition: 2019
- First winner: Harm Jansen (NED)
- Most wins: Dennis Smit (NED) (2 wins)
- Final winner: Max Kroonen (NED)

History (women)
- First edition: 1985
- Editions: 32
- Final edition: 2018
- First winner: Hennie Top (NED)
- Most wins: Debby Mansveld (NED) (4 wins)
- Final winner: Lorena Wiebes (NED)

The Parel van de Veluwe (English: Pearl of the Veluwe) was an amateur road bicycle race held in the Netherlands for men and women, that was held between 1985 and 2019. After not being held in 2020, race organisers Wielervereniging De IJsselstreek announced that December that they would no longer organise the race.

== Honours ==
=== Women's ===
Year	Winner	Second	Third
1985	Hennie Top (NED)	Gonnie van Koert (NED)	Monique Kaufmann (NED)
1986	Anita Griep (NED)	Moniquede Waal (NED)	Cynthia Lutke Schipholt (NED)
1987	Cynthia Lutke Schipholt (NED)	Jolanda Cools (NED)	Sandy Lutke Schipholt (NED)
1988	Connie Meijer (NED)	Gré Tijmes (NED)	Cora Westland (NED)
1989	Monique Knol (NED)	Daniëlle Overgaag (NED)	Gré Tijmes (NED)
1990	Kristel Werks (BEL)	Cora Westland (NED)	Monique Knol (NED)
1991	Monique de Bruin (NED)	Petra de Bruin (NED)	Esther van Verseveld (NED)
1992	Monique Knol (NED)	Petra van der Giessen (NED)	Marina van Hest (NED)
1993	Daniëlle Overgaag (NED)	Angela van Smoorenburg (NED)	Wendy Kramp (NED)
1994	Vanja Vonkx (BEL)	Daniëlle Overgaag (NED)	Hester Marieke Kroes (NED)
1995	Debby Mansveld (NED)	Nathalie Nelemans (NED)	Janneke Vos (NED)
1996	Debby Mansveld (NED)	Sissy van Alebeek (NED)	Marion Borst (NED)
1997	Vanja Vonkx (BEL)	Wendy Kramp (NED)	Hester Marieke Kroes (NED)
1998	Leontien van Moorsel (NED)	Marion van Zuilen (NED)	Marije Gemser (NED)
1999	Debby Mansveld (NED)	Sonja van Kuik (NED)	Vanja Vonkx (BEL)
2000	Mirjam Melchers (NED)	Leontien van Moorsel (NED)	Sonja van Kuik (NED)
2001	No race due to the foot-and-mouth outbreak		
2002	Sandra Missbach (GER)	Yvonne Brunen (NED)	Leontien van Moorsel (NED)
2003	Debby Mansveld (NED)	Bertine Spijkerman (NED)	Kristy Miggels (NED)
2004	Chantal Beltman (NED)	Janneke Vos (NED)	Sissy van Alebeek (NED)
2005	Sara Carrigan (AUS)	Suzanne de Goede (NED)	Christine Mos (NED)
2006	Monica Holler (SWE)	Ellen van Dijk (NED)	Inge Velthuis (NED)
2007	Vera Koedooder (NED)	Moniek Rotmensen (NED)	Mirjam Melchers (NED)
2008	Marianne Vos (NED)	Kirsten Wild (NED)	Martine Bras (NED)
2009	Chantal Blaak (NED)	Chantal Beltman (NED)	Loes Gunnewijk (NED)
2010	Marianne Vos (NED)	Martine Bras (NED)	Ellen van Dijk (NED)
2011	Kirsten Wild (NED)	Adrie Visser (NED)	Janneke Kanis (NED)
2012	Kim de Baat (NED)	Karen Elzing (NED)	Linda Ringlever (NED)
2013	Iris Slappendel (NED)	Vera Koedooder (NED)	Roxane Knetemann (NED)
2014	Floortje Mackaij (NED)	Sara Mustonen (SWE)	Roxane Knetemann (NED)
2015	Monique van de Ree (NED)	Vera Koedooder (NED)	Natalie van Gogh (NED)
2016	Annemiek van Vleuten (NED)	Janneke Ensing (NED)	Demi de Jong (NED)
2017	No race		
2018	Lorena Wiebes (NED)	Danique Braam (NED)	Femke Markus (NED)
2019	No race		
2020	No race		

=== Men's ===
Year	Winner	Second	Third
1988	Harm Jansen (NED)	Godert de Leeuw (NED)	Freddy Wolsink (NED)
1989	John de Haas (NED)	Dennis Huenders (NED)	Rudy Nagengast (NED)
1990	Remco Startman (NED)	Godert de Leeuw (NED)	Harm Jansen (NED)
1991	Arjen Vinke (NED)	Remco Startman (NED)	Mano Lubbers (NED)
1992	Richard Mulder (NED)	Martin van Steen (NED)	Patrick Rasch (NED)
1993	Paul Konings (NED)	John-Paul van Ameele (NED)	Peter Tates (NED)
1994	Rob Compas (NED)	Patrick de Boer (NED)	Bert Hiemstra (NED)
1995	Bennie Gosink (NED)	Jan de Leeuw (NED)	Bert Hiemstra (NED)
1996	Louis de Koning (NED)	Paul van Schalen (NED)	Rob Froeling (NED)
1997	Harald Dat (NED)	Wilco Zuijderwijk (NED)	Angelo van Melis (NED)
1998	Ronald van der Tang (NED)	Godert de Leeuw (NED)	Maikel den Ouden (NED)
1999	Peter van de Reep (NED)	Rick Pieterse (NED)	Sander Hup (NED)
2000	Angelo van Melis (NED)	Tom Cordes (NED)	John den Braber (NED)
2001	No race due to the foot-and-mouth outbreak		
2002	Wilco Zuijderwijk (NED)	Kenny van Hummel (NED)	Martijn Albers (NED)
2003	Tom Veelers (NED)	Pascal Hermes (NED)	Marc de Maar (CUR)
2004	Dennis Smit (NED)	Marcel Alma (NED)	Roel de Vries (NED)
2005	Bastiaan Krol (NED)	Arno Wallaard (NED)	Wilco Zuiderwijk (NED)
2006	Peter Schep (NED)	Ferdi van Katwijk (NED)	Arnoud van Groen (NED)
2007	Marvin van der Pluijm (NED)	Marco Bos (NED)	Berry Nagelhout (NED)
2008	Lieuwe Westra (NED)	Yvo Kusters (NED)	Marvin van der Pluijm (NED)
2009	Jetse Bol (NED)	Rik Kavsek (NED)	Marc Reef (NED)
2010	René Hooghiemster (NED)	Roy Eefting (NED)	Peter Jan Polling (NED)
2011	Dennis Smit (NED)	Arno van der Zwet (NED)	Stefan Poutsma (NED)
2012	Dylan Groenewegen (NED)	Yoeri Havik (NED)	Daan Meijers (NED)
2013	Jim van den Berg (NED)	Jeff Vermeulen (NED)	Koos Jeroen Kers (NED)
2014	Maurits Lammertink (NED)	Jim van den Berg (NED)	Yoeri Havik (NED)
2015	Jeff Vermeulen (NED)	Johim Ariesen (NED)	Oscar Riesebeek (NED)
2016	Jasper Hamelink (NED)	Rens te Stroet (NED)	Mitchell Mulhern (AUS)
2017	Ronan van Zandbeek (NED)	Nick van der Meer (NED)	David Dekker (NED)
2018	Jelle Wolsink (NED)	Wiebe Scholten (NED)	Robin Löwik (NED)
2019	Max Kroonen (NED)	Jarno Gmelich (NED)	Marien Bogerd (NED)
2020	No race		
