= Greg Oravetz =

American cyclist (born 1966)

Personal information
- Born: August 25, 1966 (age 60) Huntington Beach, California, U.S.

Cycling career
- Sport: Cycling
- Current team: Retired
- Discipline: Road
- Role: Rider

Professional team
- 1989–1994: Coors Light–ADR

Major wins
- National Road Race Championships, (1989) National Criterium Championships, (1991)

Greg Oravetz (born August 25, 1966) is an American former racing cyclist. He won the United States National Road Race Championships in 1989.

== Major results ==
Results:

1987
1st La Côte Picarde
1988
1st Paris–Chauny
1989
1st National Road Race Championships
1st Philly Cycling Classic
2nd Cascade Cycling Classic
1990
1st Overall Killington Stage Race

1st Stage 3

1991
1st National Criterium Championships
1st Overall Cascade Cycling Classic
1st Stages 8 & 13 Herald Sun Tour
1992
1st Prologue West-Virginia Classic
2nd First Union Grand Prix
