= Michel Zanoli =

Dutch cyclist (1968–2003)

Personal information
- Full name: Michel Jean-Paul Zanoli
- Born: 10 January 1968 Amsterdam, Netherlands
- Died: 29 December 2003 (aged 35) Haarlem, Netherlands
- Height: 196 cm (6 ft 5 in)
- Weight: 87 kg (192 lb)

Cycling career
- Sport: Cycling
- Discipline: Road
- Role: Rider

Professional teams
- 1989: AD Renting–W-Cup–Bottecchia
- 1990: Coors Light
- 1991: Tulip Computers
- 1992: Motorola
- 1993: Van Griensven–Elro Snacks
- 1995: Asfra Racing Team–Orlans–Blaze
- 1995: Montgomery–Bell
- 1996: Force Sud
- 1996: MX Onda

Major wins
- Grand Tours Vuelta a España 1 individual stage (1991)

Michel Jean-Paul Zanoli (10 January 1968 – 29 December 2003) was a road cyclist from the Netherlands. He competed in the men's road race and men's team time trial at the 1988 Summer Olympics, finishing 15th and 11th respectively. In 1991, he won the second stage of the Vuelta a España and the Philadelphia International Cycling Classic.

Zanoli died of heart failure in 2003.

== See also ==
- List of Dutch Olympic cyclists
- List of people from Amsterdam
