= David Brink (cyclist) =

American cyclist (1947–2019)

Personal information
- Born: November 25, 1947 Saint Paul, Minnesota, United States
- Died: June 29, 2019 (aged 71)

Cycling career
- Sport: Cycling

David Brink (November 25, 1947 – June 29, 2019) was an American cyclist. He competed in the individual pursuit at the 1968 Summer Olympics.
