= Jonathan Vaughters =

American racing cyclist and team manager (born 1973)

Personal information
- Full name: Jonathan Vaughters
- Nickname: JV
- Born: June 10, 1973 (age 53) Denver, Colorado, United States

Cycling career
- Sport: Cycling
- Current team: EF Education–EasyPost
- Discipline: Road
- Role: Rider (retired); Team manager

Professional teams
- 1994–1996: Porcelena Santa Clara
- 1997: Comptel Data Systems
- 1998–1999: U.S. Postal Service
- 2000–2002: Crédit Agricole
- 2003: Prime Alliance

Managerial team
- 2005–: TIAA–CREF

Jonathan James Vaughters (born June 10, 1973) is an American former professional racing cyclist and current manager of UCI WorldTeam EF Education–EasyPost.

== Racing career ==
Vaughters started competitive cycling in the 1980s, racing in the Red Zinger Mini Classics youth cycling series in Colorado.

In 1997 he moved to John Wordin's Comptel Data team, entering races he described as "A thousand times easier than being in Europe." He had a successful season becoming US National Time Trial Champion, and was 3rd in the National Road Race. His successes led to him signing for U.S. Postal Service cycling team. In 1999, he won the time trial of the Dauphiné Libéré and finished 2nd overall to Alexandre Vinokourov after losing the general classification leadership on the final stage. He then went on to win the Route du Sud in preparation for the Tour de France as part of Lance Armstrong's team that went on to Armstrong's first win. In that Tour, he earned the nickname "El Gato" (The Cat in Spanish), having landed on his feet after being thrown headfirst over his handlebars in the first stage. In the second stage, he cut his chin in a crash and had to abandon the race. This started his reputation as a somewhat innocent victim in a long series of ill-timed crashes, with an uncanny knack for being in the wrong place at the wrong time.

In 2000, Vaughters joined the French team Crédit Agricole. In the early part of the season he was third in the Tour Méditerranéen, sixth in Paris-Nice and in the Critérium International. In June, he was fifth in the Critérium du Dauphiné Libéré, after placing fourth in the stage including Mont Ventoux. In July, he participated in the Tour de France and abandoned during the tenth stage after a fall on the descent of the Col de Marie-Blanque. In 2001, he won the time trial in the Dauphiné Libéré, and the Duo Normand with teammate Jens Voigt. During the Tour de France, he was part of the winning team in the team time trial. He was again forced to retire from the Tour, however, suffering from a wasp sting above his right eye during the 14th stage (the UCI prohibited the use of cortisone injected intramuscularly or intravenously for the treatment of wounds, although it could be directly injected, e.g. for tendonitis). In 2002, he participated in his fourth and final Tour de France as a rider but failed again to reach the end of the race. He abandoned at the eleventh stage after falling in the descent of the Col d'Aubisque. Following the abandonment, he requested and received the termination of his contract with Crédit Agricole which had been due to run until the end of 2003. He retired from racing, citing a desire to spend more time with his family.

After returning to America he signed in 2003 for the U.S. team Prime Alliance 2003. He ended his career as a cyclist at the end of that year.

Vaughters was a specialist climber and was touted as a Stage race specialist. He won the Mont Ventoux stage of the Critérium du Dauphiné Libéré in 1999 and 2001, and held the record for the fastest ascent until it was broken by Iban Mayo in 2004.

Vaughters also holds the Cycle To The Sun record time of 2:38 set in 1992 for climbing Haleakala volcano on Maui, Hawaii. The record however has been unofficially beaten by Ryder Hesjedal in 2010, who climbed the volcano in 2:32.

== Managerial career ==
During 2003 Vaughters launched the new 5280/Subaru junior team originally based in Colorado. Recruitment was done by Vaughters and Prime Alliance director Roy Knickman with Colby Pearce as the head Sporting Director. In 2004, Vaughters took effective management of the team and in 2005 it was split between the 5280 junior team and the continental team TIAA-CREF.

In early 2005 Vaughters met Doug Ellis at the launch party for the new season. A computer engineer specializing in financial management software, Ellis was a huge fan of cycling since the 1980s. From 2006, the team became the property of sports management Slipstream Sports, chaired by Doug Ellis with a view to creating an American Pro-Tour team by 2009. In 2007, with the absence of a title sponsor, the team operated under the name Slipstream, and later Slipstream Sports – powered by Chipotle. A professional continental team in 2007 and a ProTour team in 2009 they participated for the first time in the Tour de France and Giro d'Italia in 2008. In February 2009, Jonathan Vaughters was elected president of the International Association of Professional Cycling Groups (AIGCP). Vaughters' Garmin-Cervélo squad took the top position in the team classification in the 2011 Tour de France.

== Personal life ==
Vaughters has been divorced twice. He attributed the breakdown of his second marriage in 2017 to being on the autistic spectrum which was diagnosed in 2018. His son had been diagnosed with autism spectrum disorder in 2012 and during the process of his evaluation, Vaughters began to suspect he may also be on the spectrum but was not evaluated himself for another six years.

== Doping experience and reflections ==
Vaughters states that he used erythropoietin (EPO) for the purpose of blood doping during 1996–2000, through organized doping schemes on the Santa Clara and U.S. Postal racing teams. He also observed other forms of doping by U.S. Postal riders, and he independently doped using EPO during 2002, until reconsidering his ethical choices. In August 2012, Vaughters published an opinion column in The New York Times entitled 'How to Get Doping Out of Sports' in which he stated his opposition to doping and expressed his regret over taking drugs during his cycling career.

== Major results ==
1995
1st Overall Tour of the Gila

1st Stage 1

1997
1st Time Trial, National Road Championships
1st Mt. Evans Hill Climb
1st Stage 2 Redlands Bicycle Classic
1st Overall Tour de Beauce

1st Stages 3 & 4

1st Overall Cascade Classic
1998
1st Overall Redlands Bicycle Classic

1st Stages 2 & 3

1999
1st Overall Route du Sud
1st Mt. Evans Hill Climb
1st Stage 4 Redlands Bicycle Classic
2nd Overall Critérium du Dauphiné Libéré

1st Stage 3 (ITT)

2000
3rd Overall Tour Méditerranéen
2001
1st Stage 5 (TTT) Tour de France
1st Stage 4 Critérium du Dauphiné Libéré
1st Duo Normand (with Jens Voigt)
2002
1st Breckenridge
1st Golden
2003
1st Stage 2 Solano Bicycle Classic
1st Mt. Evans Hill Climb
