= Michael Engleman =

American bicycle racer (born 1958)

Personal information
- Born: May 20, 1958 (age 68) Sonoma, California

Cycling career
- Sport: Cycling
- Current team: Retired
- Discipline: Road
- Role: Rider

Professional teams
- 1987-1989: Schwinn
- 1990: Alpine-Colorado
- 1991-1994: Coors Light
- 1995: Shaklee
- 1996: US Postal
- 1997-1998: Navigators

Michael Engleman (born May 20, 1958, in Sonoma, California) is a former American cyclist.

== Palmares ==
1987
1st stage 8 Coors Classic
1988
1st stage 14 Coors Classic
1989
2nd National Road Race Championships
1990
1st Cascade Classic

1st stages 1 and 2

1991
1st Bob Cook Memorial-Mount Evans
1st Thrift Drug Classic
1st stages 1 and 6 Cascade Classic
1st Herald Sun Tour

1st stages 8 and 13

1st Vuelta de Bisbee

1st stage 4

2nd Cascade Classic
3rd Tour du Limousin
1992
1st Bob Cook Memorial-Mount Evans
3rd Cascade Classic

1st Prologue

1st Chur - Arosa
1st Tour of the Adirondacks
1st Nevada City Classic
2nd Vuelta de Bisbee
3rd Coors Classic
1993
1st Bob Cook Memorial-Mount Evans
1st stage 1 Cascade Classic
1st Killington Stage Race
1st Prologue and stage 1
1st stage 1 Tour of Willamette
2nd National Criterium Championships
2nd West Virginia Classic
1994
1st Bob Cook Memorial-Mount Evans
1st Cascade Classic
1st Killington Stage Race

1st Prologue and stage 2

2nd Tour de Toona
3rd National Road Race Championships
1995
1st Bob Cook Memorial-Mount Evans
1st Cascade Classic

1st stage 2

1st Fitchburg Longsjo Classic
1st Prologue Killington Stage Race
1st Tour de Toona

1st stage 3

1st Nevada City Classic
8th World Time Trial Championship
1997
3rd Killington Stage Race
1998
1st Nevada City Classic
2nd Colorado Classic
