= Daniel Butler (cyclist) =

American cyclist (1944–1970)

Personal information
- Born: June 1, 1944 Oakland, California, United States
- Died: August 23, 1970 (aged 26) Fresno County, California, United States

Cycling career
- Sport: Cycling

Daniel Butler (June 1, 1944 – August 23, 1970) was an American cyclist. He competed in the individual road race at the 1968 Summer Olympics. A Sonoma State College student, Butler died in a hiking accident in 1970.
