= Stephen Leece =

American cyclist (born 1991)

Personal information
- Full name: Stephen Leece
- Born: November 4, 1991 (age 34) San Luis Obispo, California, United States

Cycling career
- Sport: Cycling
- Current team: Retired
- Discipline: Road
- Role: Rider

Amateur teams
- 2010–2011: NOW MS–Society
- 2012–2013: California Giant Berry Farms/Specialized
- 2017: Stinner Black Sheep Racing

Professional team
- 2014–2016: Jamis–Hagens Berman

Stephen Leece (born November 4, 1991) is an American former professional racing cyclist, who rode professionally for Team Jamis between 2014 and 2016. In 2014, Leece finished second at the Bucks County Classic, 53 seconds behind winner Zachary Bell. He rode in the men's team time trial at the 2015 UCI Road World Championships.

== Major results ==
2012
1st Nevada City Classic
2013
1st Nevada City Classic
2014
2nd Bucks County Classic

== Personal life ==
On August 9, 2025, Leece celebrated his marriage to Julianna 'Bug' Devlin Driskel at the South Coast Railroad Museum in Goleta, California.
