= Bob Tetzlaff =

American cyclist

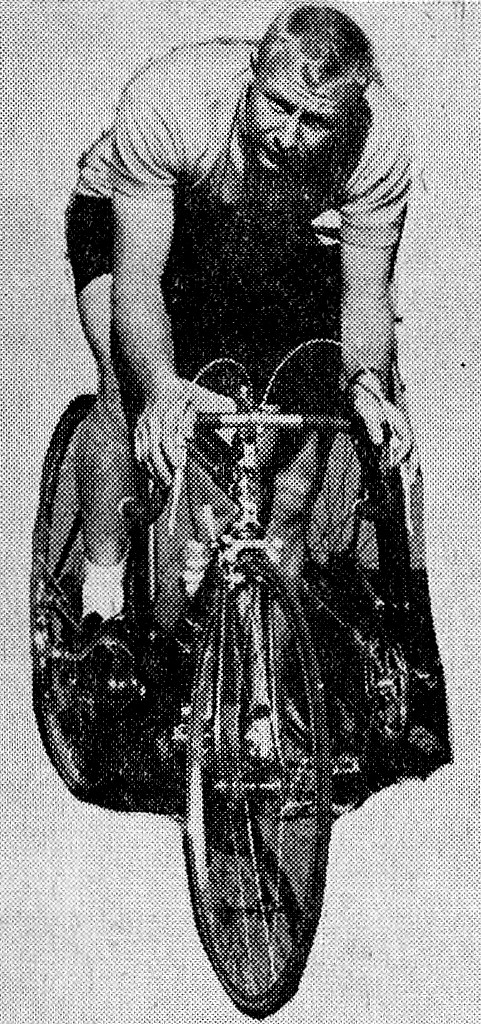
- Tetzlaff, circa 1960

Personal information
- Full name: Robert Tetzlaff
- Born: November 13, 1935 Milwaukee, Wisconsin, United States
- Died: September 27, 2012 (aged 76) Los Gatos, California, United States

Cycling career
- Sport: Cycling

Bob Tetzlaff (November 13, 1935 – September 27, 2012) was an American cyclist. He competed in the individual road race and team time trial events at the 1960 Summer Olympics.
