= International Cycling Classic =

Amateur cycling competition held in Milwaukee

Race details
- Region: Milwaukee, Wisconsin
- Discipline: Road
- Competition: National calendar
- Type: Stage race

History
- First edition: 1989
- Editions: 23
- Final edition: 2011
- First winner: Tom Valente (USA); Kendra Wenzel (USA)
- Most wins: Harm Jansen (NED); Nicky Wangsgard (USA); (3 wins)
- Final winner: Feng Chun-kai (TAI); Nicky Wangsgard (USA)

The International Cycling Classic, also known as Superweek, was a multi-day cycling race held around Milwaukee, Wisconsin. The race took place annually from 1989 to 2011 and was contested over 17 days. Beginning in 1999, there was also a women's edition of the race.

== Winners ==
=== Men ===
- 1989 : (United States) Tom Valente
- 1990 : (Italy) Roberto Gaggioli
- 1991 : (United States) Jim Copeland
- 1992 : (Italy) Roberto Gaggioli
- 1993 : (Germany) Sven Teutenberg
- 1994 : (Denmark) Lars Michaelsen
- 1995 : (Croatia) Radisa Cubric
- 1996 : (United States) Fred Rodriguez
- 1997 : (Netherlands) Harm Jansen
- 1998 : (United States) Frank McCormack
- 1999 : (Netherlands) Harm Jansen
- 2000 : (Netherlands) Pelle Kil
- 2001 : (United States) Jonas Carney
- 2002 : (Belarus) Viktor Rapinski
- 2003 : (Belarus) Viktor Rapinski
- 2004 : (Netherlands) Harm Jansen
- 2005 : (Australia) Karl Menzies
- 2006 : (Germany) Dennis Haueisen
- 2007 : (Mexico) Marco Antonio Rios
- 2008 : (Australia) Jonathan Cantwell
- 2009 : (Australia) Bernard Sulzberger
- 2010 : (Australia) Jonathan Cantwell
- 2011 : (Taiwan) Chun Kai Feng

=== Women ===
- 1999 : (United States) Kendra Wenzel
- 2000 : (United States) Andrea Smessaert
- 2001 : (Canada) Stephanie Hannos
- 2002 : (United States) Lauren Franges
- 2003 : (United States) Lynn Gaggioli
- 2004 : (United States) Tina Pic
- 2005 : (United States) Magen Long
- 2006 : (United States) Kelly Benjamin
- 2007 : (United States) Kelly Benjamin
- 2008 : (United States) Theresa Cliff-Ryan
- 2009 : (United States) Nicky Wangsgard
- 2010 : (United States) Nicky Wangsgard
- 2011 : (United States) Nicky Wangsgard
