= Scott Moninger =

American racing cyclist (born 1966)

Personal information
- Full name: Scott Moninger
- Nickname: Iceman
- Born: October 20, 1966 (age 59) Atlanta, Georgia, United States of America

Cycling career
- Sport: Cycling
- Discipline: Road
- Role: Rider

Professional team
- 1989–1997: -

Scott Moninger is an American professional road racing cyclist. He was born on October 20, 1966, in Atlanta, Georgia, grew up in Wichita, Kansas, and moved to Boulder, Colorado, in the mid 1980s to further his career in cycling. Moninger turned professional in 1991 with the Coors Light Team directed by Len Pettyjohn. Since then, he has won nearly every road race in North America with over 275 career victories, the most by any American rider at the time of retirement.

Scott retired from racing in 2007, racing his final year as a pro with the BMC Racing Team. He is currently a commentator for road racing coverage on the NBC Sports Network as an analyst for the Tour de France. He is a master-level cycling coach with Velocious Endurance Coaching, as well as a camp guide for Velocious Cycling Adventures. He is also the National Brand Ambassador for Speedplay pedals.

== Significant career highlights ==
- Professional racing career spanning 17 years, over 275 career victories
- 1992 and 2005, #1 ranked road rider in the USA (NRC Series)
- 6-time Winner Mt Evans/Bob Cook Memorial Hill Climb
- 4-time Winner Cascade Cycling Classic
- 4-time Winner Nevada city Classic
- 2-time Winner of the Redlands Classic
- Two-time winner, Tour de 'Toona
- Two-time winner, Tour of the Gila
- 1st Overall 1996 Suntour, Melbourne, Australia
- 1st Boulder to Breckenridge “Zinger Classic” 2000
- 1st Overall 2006 Tour of Utah
- Voted VeloNews North American Male road cyclist of the year, 2005
- US National Road team member 1987 – 1990
- US World Amateur Road team member – 1990, Japan
- US World Professional Road Team member - 1999 Verona, Italy

== Suspension ==
He was suspended for one year due to testing positive for the banned substance 19-norandrosterone. It was later proven by lab results from the same batch of supplements that the banned substance was not labeled on the product container of over-the-counter supplements.

== Teams ==
- 2007: BMC Professional Cycling Team
- 2003-2006 : Health Net Pro Cycling Team Presented by Maxxis
- 1999-2002: Mercury Pro Cycling Team
- 1997-1998: Navigators Pro Cycling Team
- 1995-1996: Chevrolet/LA Sheriff's Pro Cycling Team
- 1990-1994: Coors Light
- 1989-1990: Team Crest

== Racing results ==
1989

- 1st Overall, Tour of Canada
- 1st Overall, Redlands Classic

1992

- 1st, West-Virginia Mountain Classic
- 1st in General Classification Mammoth Classic (USA)
- 1st in General Classification Killington Stage Race (USA
- 1st Stage 2, 1st Stage 4, Killington Stage Race
- 1st Stage 3, Casper Classic
- 1st in Boulder (c) (USA)
- 1st in Columbus (USA)
- 1st in Stage 1 Mammoth Classic (USA)
- 1st in Stage 4 Mammoth Classic (USA)

1993

- 1st Stage 12, Herald Sun Tour
- 1st in Boulder (USA)
- 1st Stage 4 Cascade Classic (USA)
- 1st Stage 2 Killington Stage Race (USA)
- 1st Stage 4 Killington Stage Race (USA)
- 1st Stage 2 Mazda Tour (AUS)
- 1st Stage 4 Mazda Tour (AUS)
- 1st Norman Campus (USA)
- 1st in Seattle (USA)

1994

- 1st Stage 6, West Virginia Classic
- 1st in Broomfield (USA)
- 1st Nevada City Classic (USA)
- 1st in Santa Cruz (USA)
- 1st General Classification Tour de Toona (USA)

1995

- 1st overall, Redlands Classic Stage Race
- 1st Visalia (USA)
- 1st Stage 3 Cascade Classic (USA)
- 1st in Denver (USA)
- 2nd overall, Killington Stage Race

1996

- 1st overall General Classification, 1st Stage 5, Herald Sun Tour
- 1st in Stage 4 Herald Sun Tour (AUS)

1997

- 1st Niwot (USA)
- 1st Nevada City Classic (USA)

1998

- 1st, Mount Evans Hill Climb
- 1st Stage 11, 1st Stage 12, King of the Mountain, Herald Sun Tour
- 1st General Classification Colorado Classic (USA)
- 1st Salem (USA)
- 1st Arlington Classic Criterium (USA)
- 1st Athens (c) (USA)
- 1st Stage 5 Cascade Classic (USA)
- 1st Castle Rock (USA)
- 1st Stage 2 Colorado Classic (USA)
- 1st Golden (USA)
- 1st Greensboro (USA)
- 1st Stage 11 Herald Sun Tour (AUS)
- 1st Stage 12 Herald Sun Tour (AUS)
- 1st Prologue Killington Stage Race (USA)
- 1st Stage 4 Killington Stage Race (USA)
- 1st Stage 5 Tour de Toona (USA)

1999

- 3rd overall, Grand Prix Cycliste De Beauce
- Member, U.S. World Championship Road Team - Verona, Italy
- 1st General Classification Cascade Classic (USA)
- 1st Nevada City Classic (USA)
- 1st Santa Rosa, Criterium (USA)
- 1st in Boulder (USA)
- 1st in Stage 2 Cascade Classic (USA)
- 1st in Stage 3 Cascade Classic (USA)
- 1st in Stage 6 Cascade Classic (USA)

2000

- 1st Stage 4a, Grand Prix Cycliste De Beauce
- 2nd overall, Herald Sun Tour
- 1st overall, Celestial Seasonings Red Zinger Cycling Challenge
- 1st Bob Cook Memorial-Mount Evans (USA)
- 1st General Classification Cascade Classic (USA)
- 1st General Classification Tour of Willamette (USA)
- 1st in Boulder (USA)
- 1st in Sara Kay Memorial (USA)
- 1st Stage 1 Tour of Willamette (USA)
- 1st Stage 3 Tour of Willamette (USA)
- 1st Stage 2 Valley of the Sun Stage Race (USA)
- 1st Castle Rock (USA)
- 1st Zinger Cycling Challenge (USA)
- 1st Stage 1 Cascade Classic, Three Sisters Loop (USA)
- 1st Stage 5 Cascade Classic, Tumalo (USA)
- 1st Stage 6 Tour de Toona (USA)

2001

- 2nd overall and 1st Stage 6a, Grand Prix Cycliste De Beauce
- 1st General Classification Green Mountain Stagerace (USA)
- 1st Bob Cook Memorial-Mount Evans (USA)
- 1st General Classification Cascade Classic (USA)
- 1st General Classification Tour of the Gila (USA)
- 1st in Idaho Springs (USA)
- 1st in Golden (USA)
- 1st Mortgage Mart (USA)
- 1st Tour de Lafayette (USA)
- 1st Stage 1 Tour of Willamette (USA)
- 1st Stage 4 Tour of Willamette (USA)
- 1st Stage 1 Tour of the Gila, Tyrone (USA)
- 1st Stage 2 Tour of the Gila, Mogollan (USA)
- 1st Stage 5 Tour of the Gila, Gila Monster (USA)
- 1st Wichita (USA)
- 1st Stage 6 part a Tour de Beauce, Saint Georges (CAN)
- 1st Stage 2 Cascade Classic (USA)
- 1st Stage 5 Cascade Classic (USA)
- 1st Stage 1 Green Mountain Stagerace (USA)
- 1st Stage 3 Green Mountain Stagerace (USA)

2002

- 1st overall, 2 stage wins, La Vuelta De Bisbee Stage Race, Arizona
- 1st, Mount Evans Hill Climb, Idaho Springs, Colorado
- 1 stage win, Tour of the Gila, New Mexico
- 1st in Snelling (USA)
- 1st Stage 1 Vuelta de Bisbee (USA)
- 1st Stage 3 Vuelta de Bisbee, Warren (USA)
- 1st Stage 4 Vuelta de Bisbee (USA)

2003

- 1st Stage 11, Herald Sun Tour

2004

- 1st Overall, 3 stage wins, Tour of the Gila, New Mexico
- 1st Overall, 2 stage wins, Mercy Classic, Arkansas
- 1st Overall, 1 stage win, Boulder Stage Race
- 1st Stage 6, International Tour de 'Toona
- 1st Stage 1, Tri-Peaks Challenge, Arkansas
- 1st Stage 5, Estes Park Challenge
- 1st Overall, 1 stage win, Tour of Kansas City
- 1st Stazio Crit, Round 1, Boulder, Colorado
- 1st Stazio Crit, Round 2, Boulder, Colorado
- 1st, Iron Horse Road Race, Colorado
- 1st, Durango Downtown Criterium, Colorado
- 1st, Coal Miner's Classic, Colorado
- National FIAC Hill Climb Champion

2005

- 1st Overall, Cascade Cycling Classic
- 1st Overall, International Tour de Toona
- 1st Overall, San Dimas Stage Race
- 1st Overall, Joe Martin Stage Race
- 1st Overall, Tour de Nez
- 1st Overall, Rocky Mountain Omnium
- 1st KoM Classification, International Tour de Toona
- 1st Stage 6, International Tour de Toona
- 1st Stage 2, Cascade Cycling Classic
- 1st Stage 1 ITT, San Dimas Stage Race
- 1st Stage 3, Tri Peaks Challenge
- 1st Stages 2 and 3, Tour de Nez
- 1st, Mt. Evans Hill Climb/National FIAC Hill Climb Championship
- 1st, Colorado State TT Championship
- 1st, Scholfield Cycling Classic
- 1st, Parker Criterium

2006

- 1st, Mt. Evans Hill Climb/National FIAC Hill Climb Championship
- 1st Overall, General Classification, Tour of Utah
- 1st Stazio (USA)
- 1st Koppenberg USA (USA)
- 1st Oredigger Classic (USA)
- 1st Tokyo Joe's Spring (USA)
- 1st Stage 2 Tour of the Gila, Mogollon (USA)
- 1st Stage 3 Joe Martin Stage Race (USA)
- 1st Stage 6 Mount Hood Classic (USA)
- 1st Nevada City Classic (USA)
- 1st Bob Cook Memorial-Mount Evans (USA)
- 1st Stage 4 Tour of Utah, Mt. Nebo (USA)
- 1st Stage 2 Parker Mainstreet Omnium (USA)

2007

- 1st Sunshine Canyon Hill Climb
- 1st Stage 1, Redlands Bicycle Classic
- 1st Boulder TT Series Number 4 - Course Record
- 1st Stage 1 San Dimas Stage Race, San Dimas (USA)
- 1st General Classification San Dimas Stage Race (USA)
- 1st Stage 1 Redlands Bicycle Classic, Oak Glen (USA)
- 1st Stage 5 Tour of the Gila, Gila (USA)

Race results

== See also ==
- List of doping cases in cycling
- List of sportspeople sanctioned for doping offences
