= Philadelphia Cycling Classic =

American one-day road cycling race

Race details
- Date: August
- Region: Philadelphia, Pennsylvania, U.S.
- English name: Philadelphia International Championship
- Local name: TD Bank Philadelphia International Championship (in English)
- Nickname(s): CoreStates, Manayunk
- Discipline: Road
- Competition: UCI America Tour
- Type: Road race
- Web site: philadelphiacyclingclassic.com

History
- First edition: 1985
- First winner: Eric Heiden (USA)
- Most wins: Bart Bowen (USA); Kiel Reijnen (USA); 2 wins
- Most recent: Tim Torn Teutenberg (GER)

The Philadelphia Cycling Classic, previously the Philadelphia International Championship, is an annual professional bicycle race held in Philadelphia. It has been said to have been "America's top international cycling classic, and one of the richest and most prestigious one day races outside of Europe." It is one of the longest single-day races in the U.S. at 199.6 kilometres (124.0 mi). The men's event is ranked 1.1 by the International Cycling Union (UCI), the sport's governing body, which made it the highest ranked single-day race in the Western Hemisphere after the UCI World Tour, Grand Prix Cycliste de Montreal, and Grand Prix Cycliste de Quebec. It was part of the UCI America Tour. Held from 1985 through 2016, the race resumed in 2026.

There is a men's and women's event race, the latter was previously called the Liberty Classic.

== History ==
The race had existed since 1985, but its name changed a number of times, because of the changing of names of its corporate sponsors, due to bank mergers and acquisitions. The title sponsor was originally CoreStates Bank, followed by First Union Bank in 1998, then Wachovia Bank in 2002. In November 2005, Wachovia withdrew its sponsorship. With assistance from former Philadelphia mayor and then-Pennsylvania governor Ed Rendell, a corporate sponsor was found in 2006; Commerce Bank made a four-year commitment. Due to its acquisition by Toronto-Dominion Bank in 2007, Commerce Bank became TD Bank in 2008.

The Philadelphia International Championship was once the final leg of a one-week, 3-race circuit called the TD Bank Triple Crown of Cycling. The races took place in Lancaster, Reading and Philadelphia. The opening race was the Lancaster Classic, followed four days later by the Reading Classic, with the finale in Philadelphia three days after that.

Through 2005, the highest placed finisher registered in the United States was named the USPRO champion, whether or not he won the race. The race was often called the USPRO Championship; however, USA Cycling, the national governing body, stripped the Philadelphia race of the USPRO title, wanting to limit the race to Americans. Local organizers insisted the field remain open to the pros from all around the world.

Top cyclists who have participated include Eric Heiden, who won the race in 1985, Greg LeMond, and Lance Armstrong, who started his professional career when he won the race in 1993. The cancellation of the 2017 races was announced by the UCI at the end of January 2017, citing difficulty in obtaining sponsorship resulting in financial difficulties for the organizers.

In September 2025 it was reported that the classic would return from its ten-year hiatus on August 30, 2026, with professional men's and women's races.

=== Liberty Classic ===
The Liberty Classic was an annual women's one-day 57.6 mile road bicycle race consisting of four laps of a 14.4 mile circuit through Philadelphia with five climbs up the Manayunk Wall. The event ran from 1994 through 2016. It was the final leg of the inaugural 2006 Commerce Bank Triple Crown of Cycling for women. The Triple Crown was a one-week, three-race circuit, with the three races taking place in the Eastern Pennsylvania cities of Allentown, Reading and Philadelphia. The opening race was the Lehigh Valley Classic, followed two days later by the Reading Classic, with the Liberty Classic finale in Philadelphia three days after the Reading race.

In January 2013, the race's organizers announced that the 2013 International Championship and Liberty Classic had been canceled, with local media reporting a breakdown in the relationship between the organizers and the city authorities; however, in May 2013 a group of local politicians and promoters announced the revival of the men's and women's races as the Philadelphia Cycling Classic, under the direction of Robin Morton.

In 2015, the event became part of the UCI Women's Road World Cup, and was included in the inaugural UCI Women's World Tour the year after, but was discontinued after 2016.

== Route ==
The seven-lap men's race consisted of a three-lap 1.6 km (0.99 mi) opening circuit, followed by seven 23.2 km (14.4 mi) laps of the primary circuit, then a five-lap 4.8 km closing circuit. The total distance was 251 km (156 mi). The women's race was on the same course but started later and was shorter: 4 laps of the primary circuit for 92.7 km (57.6 mi). The race started on the Benjamin Franklin Parkway and then headed along Kelly Drive into the northwest section of the city, through East Falls, Manayunk, and Roxborough, then returned to the Parkway and Logan Circle to complete its loop, passing parts of Fairmount Park along the way.

=== Manayunk Wall ===
In bicycling terminology, a "wall" is a steep incline. The Manayunk Wall, located by Jerry Casale and David Chauner when they were laying out the course in 1985, refers to Levering Street and Lyceum Avenue in northwest Philadelphia. It begins at Main Street and Levering Street in the neighborhood of Manayunk, proceeds on the Belgian block Cresson Street under the elevated railway, then back on to Levering Street.

Most of the Wall is part of Levering Street, but it becomes Lyceum Avenue at Tower Street. The steepest section, a 17-percent grade, commences just after the slight left turn when going up at the intersection with Tower Street, and ends at the intersection with Fleming street. It becomes less steep on the stretch with O'Brien's as it crosses Manayunk Avenue. It nearly flattens and ends at Pechin Street in Roxborough, which most news crews set up for broadcasting. The right turn off Lyceum Avenue onto Pechin Street begins The Fall from the Wall. Manayunk Avenue is the boundary of Manayunk and Roxborough.

O'Brien's Water Hole along the wall sets up a water sprinkler for cyclists to ride through. In early years, no one seemed to mind but as the race became more important, it was criticized as a distraction and reduced. On June 5, 2002, Manayunk designated the 17-percent grade as the Manayunk Wall. Olympic gold medalist Marty Nothstein presented a plaque.

== Downhill race ==
At midnight, the morning of the international championship, an unlicensed race down The Wall took place from 1996 to 2006. "The Downhill" was conceived at Dawson Street Pub. Racers gathered there to walk to The Wall. The race started at Manayunk Avenue and Lyceum Avenue and continued to the bottom of the hill or until where police blocked the street. The race included BMX bikes, tricycles, shopping carts, wheelchairs, skateboards, bed frames, and roller skates. The event grew in popularity after being promoted on a radio station in 2003 and several thousand spectators attended in 2006. A young man was injured during the 2006 race when he was blindsided by another individual who was careening down the wall in a shopping cart. Police are generally credited as permanently stopping The Downhill race. On September 6, 2008, the Red Bull Soapbox Race was held at the Manayunk Wall.

== Past winners ==
=== Men's General Classification ===
- Also served as USPRO Championships for USA riders up to 2005

Year	Country	Rider	Team
1985	United States	Eric Heiden	7-Eleven
1986	United States	Thomas Prehn	Schwinn–Icy Hot
1987	United States	Tom Schuler	7-Eleven
1988	Italy	Roberto Gaggioli	Pepsi-Cola–Fanini–FNT
1989	United States	Greg Oravetz	Coors Light–ADR
1990	Italy	Paolo Cimini	Gis Gelati–Benotto
1991	Netherlands	Michel Zanoli	Tulip Computers
1992	United States	Bart Bowen	Subaru–Montgomery
1993	United States	Lance Armstrong	Motorola
1994	Great Britain	Sean Yates	Motorola
1995	United States	Norman Alvis	Saturn
1996	United States	Eddy Gragus	U.S. Postal Service
1997	Italy	Massimiliano Lelli	Saeco–Estro
1998	United States	George Hincapie	U.S. Postal Service
1999	Denmark	Jakob Piil	Acceptcard Pro Cycling
2000	Australia	Henk Vogels	Manheim Auctions–Mercury
2001	United States	Fred Rodriguez	Domo–Farm Frites–Latexco
2002	Canada	Mark Walters	Navigators
2003	Italy	Stefano Zanini	Saeco
2004	Spain	Francisco Ventoso	Saunier Duval–Prodir
2005	United States	Chris Wherry	Health Net–Maxxis
2006	New Zealand	Greg Henderson	Health Net–Maxxis
2007	Argentina	Juan José Haedo	Team CSC
2008	Denmark	Matti Breschel	Team CSC
2009	Germany	André Greipel	Team Columbia–High Road
2010	Australia	Matthew Goss	Team HTC–Columbia
2011	Denmark	Alex Rasmussen	HTC–Highroad
2012	Russia	Alexander Serebryakov	Team Type 1–Sanofi
2013	United States	Kiel Reijnen	UnitedHealthcare
2014	United States	Kiel Reijnen	UnitedHealthcare
2015	Spain	Carlos Barbero	Caja Rural–Seguros RGA
2016	Spain	Eduard Prades	Caja Rural–Seguros RGA
2026	Germany	Tim Torn Teutenberg	Lidl–Trek

=== VisitPA.com Best Climber’s Award ===
Year	Best Climber	Team
2007	Neil Shirley (USA)	Jittery Joe's
2008	Davide Frattini (ITA)	Colavita–Sutter Home
2009	Valery Kobzarenko (UKR)	Team Type 1

=== Women's General Classification ===
Winner were:

Year	Country	Rider	Team
1994	Sweden	Marianne Bergelund	Team Bodywise
1995	Canada	Clara Hughes	Saturn Cycling Team
1996	Germany	Petra Rossner	Team Vanwood
1997	Lithuania	Edita Pučinskaitė	Acca Due O
1998	Germany	Petra Rossner	Team Saturn
1999	Germany	Petra Rossner	Team Saturn
2000	Germany	Petra Rossner	Team Saturn
2001	Germany	Petra Rossner	Team Saturn
2002	Germany	Petra Rossner	Team Saturn
2003	Canada	Lyne Bessette	Team Saturn
2004	Germany	Petra Rossner	Team Saturn
2005	Germany	Ina-Yoko Teutenberg	T-Mobile
2006	Germany	Regina Schleicher	Equipe Nürnberger
2007	Germany	Ina-Yoko Teutenberg	T-Mobile Women
2008	Netherlands	Chantal Beltman	Team High Road Women
2009	Germany	Ina-Yoko Teutenberg	Team Columbia Women
2010	Germany	Ina-Yoko Teutenberg	Team Columbia Women
2011	Italy	Giorgia Bronzini	Diadora-Pasta Zara
2012	Germany	Ina-Yoko Teutenberg	Team Specialized-lululemon
2013	United States	Evelyn Stevens	Team Specialized-lululemon
2014	United States	Evelyn Stevens	Team Specialized-lululemon
2015	Great Britain	Elizabeth Armistead-Deignan	Boels - Dolmans Cycling Team
2016	United States	Megan Guarnier	Boels - Dolmans Cycling Team
2026	Italy	Chiara Consonni	CANYON//SRAM

==== Other places ====
Year	First	Second	Third
1994	Marianne Berglund (SWE)	Julie Young (USA)	Dede Barry (USA)
1995	Clara Hughes (CAN)	Jeannie Golay (USA)	Jacqui Nelson (NZL)
1996	Petra Rossner (GER)	Jeannie Golay (USA)	Karen Livingston (USA)
1997	Edita Pučinskaitė (LTU)	Rasa Polikevičiūtė (LTU)	Karen Kurreck (USA)
1998	Petra Rossner (GER)	Diana Žiliūtė (LTU)	Gabriella Pregnalato (ITA)
1999	Petra Rossner (GER)	Karen Dunne (USA)	Hanka Kupfernagel (GER)
2000	Petra Rossner (GER)	Diana Žiliūtė (LTU)	Vera Hohlfeld (GER)
2001	Petra Rossner (GER)	Anna Millward (AUS)	Debby Mansveld (NED)
2002	Petra Rossner (GER)	Laura Van Gilder (USA)	Dede Barry (USA)
2003	Lyne Bessette (CAN)	Lynn Gaggioli (USA)	Judith Arndt (GER)
2004	Petra Rossner (GER)	Gina Grain (CAN)	Laura Van Gilder (USA)
2005	Ina-Yoko Teutenberg (GER)	Regina Schleicher (GER)	Laura Van Gilder (USA)
2006	Regina Schleicher (GER)	Ina-Yoko Teutenberg (GER)	Tina Pic (USA)
2007	Ina-Yoko Teutenberg (GER)	Regina Schleicher (GER)	Gina Grain (CAN)
2008	Chantal Beltman (NED)	Brooke Miller (USA)	Ina-Yoko Teutenberg (GER)
2009	Ina-Yoko Teutenberg (GER)	Joanne Kiesanowski (NZL)	Shelley Olds (USA)
2010	Ina-Yoko Teutenberg (GER)	Shelley Olds (USA)	Theresa Cliff-Ryan (USA)
2011	Giorgia Bronzini (ITA)	Shelley Olds (USA)	Jennifer Purcell (USA)
2012	Ina-Yoko Teutenberg (GER)	Rochelle Gilmore (AUS)	Giorgia Bronzini (ITA)

== See also ==
- Cycling
- List of road bicycle racing events
