= Kimberly Baldwin =

American cyclist (born 1970)

Personal information
- Full name: Kimberly Bruckner Baldwin
- Born: June 19, 1970 (age 56) Chicago, Illinois, U.S.

Cycling career
- Sport: Cycling
- Discipline: Road cycling

Professional teams
- 2001–2002: Saturn
- 2003–2006: T-Mobile Professional Cycling
Medal record
Representing United States
Women's road cycling
Pan American Games
Gold medal – first place	2003 Santo Domingo	Time Trial

Kimberly Bruckner Baldwin (born June 19, 1970, in Chicago, Illinois) is an American road cyclist. She represented her nation at the 2001, 2002, 2004 and 2006 UCI Road World Championships.
