= Reading Classic =

The Reading Classic was an annual bicycle road racing event held in Reading, Pennsylvania from 2006 to 2008. In its inaugural year, the 2006 Reading Classic was part of the Commerce Bank Triple Crown of Cycling on the United States' Pro Cycling Tour (PCT), and served as a replacement of the Trenton Classic. The men's elite event is ranked 1.1 by the International Cycling Union (UCI), the sport's governing body, and is part of the UCI America Tour.

An uphill struggle in the 2006 Reading Classic

== Men's results ==
2006 results
1. (New Zealand) Greg Henderson, Health Net Pro Cycling Team Presented by Maxxis
2. (Uzbekistan) Sergey Lagutin, Navigators Insurance Cycling Team
3. (United States) Danny Pate, Team TIAA–CREF
2007 results
1. (Austria) Bernhard Eisel, T-Mobile Team
2. (Argentina) Alejandro Borrajo, Rite Aid Pro Cycling
3. (Russia) Oleg Grishkin, Navigators Insurance Cycling Team
2008 results
1. (Spain) Óscar Sevilla, Rock Racing
2. (Norway) Edvald Boasson Hagen, Team High Road
3. (Austria) Bernhard Eisel, Team High Road

== Women's results ==
2006 results
1. (Germany) Ina Teutenberg, T-Mobile Women
2. (United States) Katherine Carroll, Victory Brewing Pro Cycling Team
3. (Australia) Rochelle Gilmore, Advil-Chapstick USA
2007 results
1. (Germany) Ina Teutenberg, T-Mobile Women
2. (United States) Theresa Cliff Ryan, Verducci Breakaway Racing
3. (United States) Laura Van Gilder, Cheerwine
2008 results
1. (Germany) Ina Teutenberg, Team High Road
2. (New Zealand) Joanne Kiesanowski, Team TIBCO
3. (United States) Laura Van Gilder, Cheerwine

== See also ==
- Lancaster Classic
- Philadelphia International Championship
- Liberty Classic
- List of road bicycle racing events
