= United States National Track Championships =

Annual cycling competition in the US

The United States National Track Championships are held annually. Organized by USA Cycling, they are competitions of various track cycling disciplines in age and gender categories.

The championships have evolved over the years to include more events for men and women. A scratch race was introduced in 2002, as well as a women's keirin. The men's madison had been held for over a century before a women's madison was first introduced in 2009.

== Men ==
=== Senior (Amateur) ===
Year	Gold	Silver	Bronze
Points race
1950	Al Stiller		
1951	Al Stiller		
1977	Nelson Saldana	Fred Markham	Danny Van Haute
1978	Ron Skarin	Joe Sanders	Roger Young
1979	Gus Pipenhagen		
1980	Scott Hembree		
1981	Ron Skarin		
1982	John Beckman		
1983	Brent Emery		
1984	Mark Whitehead		
1985	Carl Sundqvist		
1986	Franke Andreau		
1987	Dan Vogt		
1988	Franke Andreau	Dan Vogt	
1989	Craig Shommer		
1990	Jim Pollak		
1991	James Carney		
1992	James Carney		
1999	Colby Pearce		
2000	James Carney	Colby Pearce	Daniel Larson
2001	James Carney		
2002	James Carney		
2003	James Carney		
2004	James Carney		
2005	Robert Lea		
2006	Michael Creed		
2007	Michael Friedman		
2008	Colby Pearce		
2009	Taylor Phinney		

=== Senior (Elite) ===
Year	Gold	Silver	Bronze
Pursuit
1977	Paul Deem	Dave Gryllis	Alan Kingsbery
1978	Dave Grylls	Leonard Nitz	Danny Van Haute
1979	Dave Grylls		
1980	Leonard Nitz		
1981	Leonard Nitz		
1982	Leonard Nitz		
1983	Leonard Nitz		
1984	Steve Hegg		
1985	Carl Sundquist		
1986	Carl Sundquist		
1987	Carl Sundquist		
1988	David Brinton		
1989	Steve Hegg		
1999	Tommy Mulkey		
2000	Michael Tillman		Adham Sbeih
2001	Michael Tillman		
2002	Michael Tillman		
2003	Kenny Williams	Tyler Farrar	Adham Sbeih
2004	Robert Lea	Kenny Williams	Curtis Gunn
2005	Charles Bradley Huff	Robert Lea	Curtis Gunn
2006	Michael Friedman	Charles Bradley Huff	Roger Rilling
2007	Taylor Phinney	Charles Bradley Huff	Michael Friedman
2008	Taylor Phinney		
2009	Taylor Phinney	Roman Kilun	Daniel Harm
Kilometer
1977	Jerry Ash	Bob Vehe	Fred Markham
1978	Jerry Ash	Leigh Barczewski	Fred Markham
1979	Jerry Ash		
1980	Brent Emery		
1981	Brent Emery		
1982	Leonard Nitz		
1983	Mark Whitehead		
1984	Leonard Nitz		
1985	Rory O'Reilly	Gordon Jenkins	
1986	Bill Drysdale		
1987	John Hays	David Lindsey	David Lettieri
1988	Bobby Livingston		
1989	Erin Hartwell		
1995	Sky Christopherson	Erin Hartwell	Jeff Solt
2000	Jonas Carney	Nathan Rogut	
2001	Marty Nothstein		
2002	Michael Beers		
2003	Bobby Lea		
2004	Anton Quist		
2005	Christian Stahl		
2006	Stephen Hill	Steve Beardsley	David Espinoza
2007	Stephen Hill	David Espinoza	Steve Pelaez
2008	Taylor Phinney	Jimmy Watkins	Stephen Hill
2009	Giddeon Massie	Taylor Phinney	David Espinoza
Sprint
1977	Leigh Barczewski	Gibby Hatton	Carl Leusenkamp
1978	Leigh Barczewski	Jerry Ash	Kurtis Miller
1979	Leigh Barczewski		
1980	Mark Gorski		
1981	Les Barczewski		
1982	Mark Gorski		
1983	Mark Gorski		
1984	Nelson Vails		
1985	Mark Gorski		
1986	Scott Berryman		
1987	Scott Berryman		
1988	Ken Carpenter		
1989	Ken Carpenter		
1990			
2000	Marty Nothstein		
2001	Marty Nothstein		
2002	Jeffrey LaBauve		
2003	Stephen Alfred		
2004	Michael Blatchford		
2005	Stephen Alfred		
2006	Giddeon Massie	Adam Duvendeck	Michael Blatchford
2007	Michael Blatchford	Ben Barczewski	Adam Duvendeck
2008	Jimmy Watkins	Stephen Hill	Lanell Rockmore
2009	Jeremy Adam Duvendeck	Giddeon Massie	Daniel Walker
Keirin
1999	Marty Nothstein		
2000	Marty Nothstein		
2001	Marty Nothstein		
2002	Garth Blackburn		
2003	Marty Nothstein	Benjamin Barczewski	Stephen Alfred
2004	Marty Nothstein	Andy Lakatosh	Robert Lindstrom
2005	Stephen Alfred	Ryan Nelman	Aaron Kacala
2006	Adam Duvendeck	Kevin Selker	Gideon Massie
2007	Gideon Massie	Benjamin Barczewski	Brent Stein
2008	Jimmy Watkins	Justin Williams	Lanell Rockmore
2009	Giddeon Massie	David Espinoza	Steven Beardsley
Scratch race
2002	Marty Nothstein		
2003	Colby Pearce	Scott Zwizanski	Tim Reinhart
2004	Josh Kerkhof	Walker Starr	Guillaume Nelessen
2005	Josh Kerkhof	David McCook	Ryan Miller
2006	David McCook	Cody O'Reilly	Dan Vogt
2007	David McCook	Cody O'Reilly	Steve Pelaez
2008	Daniel Holloway	Kenny Williams	Cody O'Reilly
2009	Bobby Lea	Julian Kyer	Daniel Holloway
Tandem Sprints
1984	Nelson Vails, Les Barczewski		
1985	Nelson Vails, Les Barczewski		
1986	Nelson Vails, Scott Berryman		
1987	David Lindsey, Russell Meade		
1988	Barley Bell, Tom Brinker		
1989	Marty Nothstein, Paul Swift		
1990			
1991	Marty Nothstein, Erin Hartwell	Bartley Bell, Sean Tulley	

=== Under 23 ===
Year	Gold	Silver	Bronze
Points race
2008	Daniel Holloway	Guy East	Jackie Simes

=== Junior ===
Year	Gold	Silver	Bronze		
Kilometer
1977	Bruce Donaghy				
1978	Pat McDonough				
1979	Peter Kron				
1980	Matt Francis				
1981	John Waite				
1982	Craig Schommer				
1983	Kit Kyle				
1984	Paul Swift				
1985	Sean Tulley	Bill Drysdale	Frank Filardi		
1986	Marcello Arrue				
1987	Tom Brinker				
1988	Jonas Carney				
1989	J.D. Moffitt, Jr.				
Pursuit
1976	Andy Weaver				
1977	Andy Weaver				
1978	Grant Handley				
1979	Jeff Rutter				
1980	Mike Rosenhaus				
1981	Dave Lettieri				
1982	Dave Lettieri				
1983	Roy Knickman				
1984	Frankie Andreu	Dan Vogt			
1985	Mike McCarthy	Pierre Stroot	Bill Drysdale		
1987	Erin Hartwell	Charlie Issendorf	Craig Workman		
1988	Adam Payne				
1989	Brett Reagan				
2003	Zachary Grabowski	Tucker Brown	David Fleischhauer		
2005	Daniel Holloway	Cody O'Reilly	Taylor Brown		
2007	Nik Reinert				
2008	Brian Larsen	Alan Ting	Danny Finneran		
2009	Ian Moir	Danny Heeley	Zack Stein		
2010	Lawson Craddock	Mathew Lipscomb	Zach Noonan		
2011	Gregory Daniel	Mathew Lipscomb	Paul Lynch		
2012	Jordan Cullen	Gregory Daniel	Zachary Carlson		
2013	Jordan Cullen	Michael Dessau	Zachary Carlson		
Sprint
1978	Mark Gorski				
1979	Mark Whitehead				
1980	Matt Francis				
1981	John Waite				
1982	Joe Chang				
1983	Bobby Livingston				
1984	Paul Swift				
1985	Steve Ziegler				
1986	Marcello Arrue				
1987	Tom Brinker				
1988	Marty Nothstein				
1989	Marty Nothstein				
2009	Colton Barrett	Tynan Farley	Alan Ting		
2010					
Keirin
2003	Andy Lakatosh	Benjamin Barczewski	Aaron Kacala		
2005	Benjamin Barczewski	Spencer Hartfeld	Mike Schnabel		
2008	Epes Harris	Daniel Walker	Kit Karzen		
2009	Alan Ting	Matthew Baranoski	Morgan Ryan		
Points race
1978	Jay Osborne				
1979	Pat McDonough				
1980	John Butler				
1981					
1982					
1983	Roy Knickman				
1984	Aaron Deruntz				
1985	Aaron Deruntz	Russell Scott	Theodore Kirkbride.		
1987	neal fraser	2003	Christopher Remaly	Marty Cahill	Tucker Brown
2005	Richard Schenck	Daniel Holloway	Rodney Santiago		
2006	Barry Miller				
2007	Nik Reinert	Shane Kline	Grant Boursaw		
2008	Kit Karzen	Michael Niemi	Zack Stein		
2009	Zack Stein	Ian Moir	Danny Heeley		
2010	John Tomlinson	Daniel Farinha	Joseph Prettyman		
Scratch race
2003	Christopher Remaly	Ryan Luttrell	Chris Mehus		
2008	Erik Meier	Lanell Rockmore	Iggy Silva		
2009	John Tomlinson	Ian Moir	Zack Stein		

=== Madison ===
Year	Gold	Silver	Bronze
1901	Floyd McFarland & ?		
1904	Floyd McFarland & ?		
1976	Roger Young & Mike Moale	Fred Markham & Dave Boll	Ted Waterbury & Tim Zasadny
1977	Roger Young & Danny Van Haute	Fred Markham & Bobby Allen	Mike Moale & Ted Waterbury
1978	Roger Young & Danny Van Haute	Mike Moale & Eric Moe	Russell & Manck
1985	Dan Vogt & Chris Gutowski		
1989	Dan Vogt & Carl Sundqvist		
2000	Colby Pearce & Michael Tillman		
2001	Jame Carney & Colby Pearce		
2002	Jame Carney & Colby Pearce		
2003	Jackson Stewart & Erik Saunders	Jonas Carney & Colby Pearce	Kenny Williams & Tyler Farrar
2004	Matt Stephens & Charles Bradley Huff	Jonas Carney & Colby Pearce	Robert Lea & James Carney
2005	Colby Pearce & Chad Hartley	Michael Friedman & Robert Lea	Rahsaan Bahati & Erik Saunders
2006	Charles Bradley Huff & Michael Friedman	Chad Hartley & Rahsaan Bahati	Dan Vogt & Austin Carroll
2007	Robert Lea & Colby Pearce	Rahsaan Bahati & Austin Carroll	Michael Friedman & Charles Bradley Huff
2008	Colby Pearce & Daniel Holloway	Guy East & Austin Carroll	Danny Heeley & Ian Moir
2009	Cody O'Reilly & Iggy Silva	Ryan Luttrell & Ryan Sabga	Shane Kline & Bobby Lea

=== Junior Madison ===
Year	Gold	Silver	Bronze
2003	Marty Cahill & Adam Southerland	Chris Ruhl & Julian Cushing	Ryan Luttrell & Dean Tracy
2006	Shane Kline & Nik Reinert		
2007	Shane Kline & Nik Reinert		
2009	Danny Heeley & Kit Karzen	Ian Moir & Benjamin Swedberg	Jesse Marans & Colt Peterson

=== Team sprint ===
Year	Gold	Silver	Bronze
1995	Sky Christopherson, Jeff Solt, Bill Clay		
2000	Jonas Carney, Johnny Barios, Marty Nothstein & Marcello Arrue		
2001	Marty Nothstein, Josh Weir & Sky Christopherson		
2002	Giddeon Massie, Garth Blackburn, Jeffery LaBauve & Adam Duvendeck		
2003	Giddeon Massie, Marty Nothstein, Andy Lakatosh & Christian Stahl		
2004			
2005	Ryan Nelman, Kevin Belz & Christian Stahl		
2006	Kevin Selker, Giddeon Massie & Michael Blatchford	Benjamin Barczewski, Andrew Lakatosh, Spencer Hartfield & Adam Duvendeck	Ryan Nelman, Eduardo Cocina & Mike Friedman
2007	Giddeon Massie, Ryan Nelman & Ben Barczewski		
2008	Dean Tracy, Kelyn Akuna & Jimmy Watkins		
2009	Lanell Rockmore, Dean Tracy & Kevin Mansker	Kelyn Akuna, Steven Beardsley & Daniel Walker	Andrew LaCorte, Dean Tracy & David Espinoza

=== Junior Team sprint ===
Year	Gold	Silver	Bronze
2009	Daniel Farinha, Vincent Juarez & Eddie Zhang	Royce Strange, Imari Miller & Sean Pinard	Danny Heeley, Benjamin Swedberg & Jesse Marans

=== Team Pursuit ===
Year	Gold	Silver	Bronze
1977	Southern California: Kevin Lutz, Ron Skarin, Paul Deem, Bobby Allen	Northern California: Leonard Nitz, Gentes, Muzzy, Gall	Illinois: Danny Van Haute, Mike Farrell, Scott Pipenhagen, Andrews
1985	Danny Van Haute, Mark Whitehead, Patrick McDonough, Carl Sunquist.	Dan Vogt, Chris Gutowsky, Chris Gato, Carl Sunqvist	Pierre Stroot, Mike McCarthy, David Fish, Theodore Kirkbride.
1987		Dan Vogt, Chris Gutowsky, Chris Gato, ?	
1999	Tommy Mulkey, Ryan Miller & Adam Laurent		
2000	Erin Hartwell, Mariano Friedick, Derek Bouchard-Hall & Tommy Mulkey		
2001	James Carney, Jonas Carney, Colby Pearce & Ryan Miller		
2002	James Carney, Colby Pearce, Kenny Williams & Michael Tillman		
2003	Mariano Friedick, Tyler Farrar, Adham Sbeih & Kenny Williams		
2004	Colby Pearce, James Carney, Robert Lea & Guillaume Nelessen		
2005	Guillaume Nelessen, Michael Friedman, Robert Lea & Ryan Miller	Kenny Williams, Charles Bradley Huff, Curtis Gunn & Colby Pearce	William Frischkorn, Todd Yezefski, Nathan Mitchell & Dan Vogt
2006	Michael Creed, Michael Friedman, William Frischkorn & Charles Bradley Huff	Jamiel Danesh, Taylor Tolleson, Daniel Harm & Todd Yezefski	Austin Carroll, Dan Vogt, Roger Rilling & John Allen
2007	Colby Pearce, Charles Bradley Huff, Michael Friedman & Michael Creed	Ben Jacques-Maynes, Roman Kilun, David McCook & Jamiel Danesh	Daniel Harm, Tom Zirbel, Kenny Williams & James Stangeland
2008	Taylor Phinney, Daniel Holloway, Colby Pearce & Charles Bradley Huff	Kenny Williams, Daniel Harm, Roman Kilun & James Stangeland	Ian Burnett, Zach Watson, Daniel Lionberg & Julian Kyer
2009	Julian Kyer, Ian Moir, Taylor Phinney & Justin Williams	Daniel Lionberg, Ryan Luttrell, Ryan Sabga & Zach Watson	Daniel Harm, Roman Kilun, Bobby Lea & Stephen Pelaez
2013	Stefan Rothe, Jacob Duehring, Liam Donoghue & Mike Zagorski	Zachary Kovalcik, Al Urbanski, Colin Gibson & Justin Williams	Alexander Freund, Keith Hillier, Garrett Hankins & William Myers

=== Junior Team Pursuit ===
Year	Gold	Silver	Bronze
2012	Jordan Cullen, Jonathon Schilling, Zack Gould, Noah Williams	Michael Dessau, Zeke Mostov, Jake Silverberg, Imari Miller	
2013	Jordan Cullen, Jonathon Schilling, Michael Dessau, Zeke Mostov		

== Women ==
=== Senior ===
Year	Gold	Silver	Bronze
Pursuit
1977	Connie Carpenter	Carrie Peterson	Mary Jane Reoch
2001	Erin Mirabella		
2002	Angela Vargas		
2003	Sarah Uhl		
2004	Annette Hanson	Nancy Lux	Larssyn Staley
2005	Sarah Hammer	Erin Veenstra-Mirabella	Kristin Armstrong
2006	Sarah Hammer	Katie Compton	Neva B. Day
2007	Dotsie Bausch	Christen King	Angela Coggan
2008	Kimberly Geist	Alison Powers	Shannon Koch
2009	Sarah Hammer	Dotsie Bausch	Heather Jackson
500 metre TT
2001	Tanya Lindenmuth		
2002	Tanya Lindenmuth		
2003	Christine Witty		
2004	Becky Conzelman		
2005	Jennie Reed	Anna Lang	Martha Dunne
2006	Jennie Reed		
2007	Liz Reap		
2008	Cari Higgins		
2009	Cristin Walker	Cari Higgins	Colleen Hayduk
Sprint
1977	Sue Novara	Barbara Amurgey	Connie Carpenter
2001	Tanya Lindenmuth		
2002	Tanya Lindenmuth		
2003	Christine Witty		
2004	Becky Conzelman		
2005	Jennie Reed		
2006	Jennie Reed		
2007	Jennie Reed		
2008	Cari Higgins		
2009	Cristin Walker	Cari Higgins	Dana Feiss
Keirin
2002	Jennie Reed		
2003	Sarah Uhl		
2004	Suzanne Goodwin		
2005	Jennie Reed	Rebecca Quinn	Anna Webb
2006	Jennie Reed	Anna Lang	Michelle Bono
2007	Jennie Reed	Liz Reap-Carlson	Christin Walker
2008	Cari Higgins	Dana Feiss	Christin Walker
2009	Cristin Walker	Dana Feiss	Anna Lang
Points race
2001	Erin Mirabella		
2002	Sarah Uhl		
2003	Erin Mirabella		
2004	Ashley Kimmett		
2005	Sarah Hammer	Lauren Franges	Kori Seehafer
2006	Sarah Hammer	Rebecca Quinn	Theresa Cliff-Ryan
2007	Rebecca Quinn	Heather Albert-Hall	Katharine Lundby
2008	Kacey Manderfield	Alison Powers	Theresa Cliff-Ryan
2009	Sarah Hammer	Theresa Cliff-Ryan	Shelley Olds
Scratch race
2002	Rebecca Quinn		
2003	Sarah Hammer		
2004	Rebecca Quinn		
2005	Rebecca Quinn	Sarah Hammer	Anna Webb
2006	Sarah Hammer	Rebecca Quinn	Theresa Cliff-Ryan
2007	Christen King	Rebecca Quinn	Theresa Cliff-Ryan
2008	Shelley Olds	Kacey Manderfield	Rebecca Quinn
2009	Shelley Olds	Colleen Hayduk	Catherine Fielder-Cook

=== Junior ===
Year	Gold	Silver	Bronze
Pursuit
2005	Kimberly Geist	Natalie Klemko	Lauren Tracy
2008	Mary Costelloe	Colleen Gulick	Colleen Hayduk
2009	Coryn Rivera	Colleen Gulick	Kaitlin Antonneau
500 metre TT
2009	Colleen Gulick	Shelbe Eck	Madalyn Godby
Sprint
2009	Shelbe Eck	Madalyn Godby	Colleen Gulick
Keirin
2005	Natalie Klemko	Cindy-Joy Lakatosh	Shelby Allen
2008	Colleen Hayduk	Shelby Reynolds	Elspeth Huyett
2009	Colleen Gulick	Shelby Reynolds	Madalyn Godby
Points race
2008	Colleen Hayduk	Mary Costelloe	Shelby Reynolds
2009	Kendall Ryan	Coryn Rivera	Shelby Reynolds
Scratch race
2005	Kimberly Geist	Cindy-Joy Lakatosh	Natalie Klemko
2008	Colleen Hayduk	Elspeth Huyett	Nina Santiago
2009	Colleen Gulick	Kendall Ryan	Shelbe Eck

=== Women's Madison ===
Year	Gold	Silver	Bronze
2009	Anna Lang & Jennifer Reither	Cari Higgins & Christen King	Catherine Fielder-Cook & Cassandra Holman

=== Women's Team Sprint ===
Year	Gold	Silver	Bronze
2005	Anna Lang & Martha Dunne		
2006	Jennie Reed & Liz Carlson	Anna Lang & Martha Dunne	Sarah Hammer & Shelby Allen
2007	Liz Reap & Cari Higgins	Anna Lang & Martha Dunne	
2008	Liz Reap-Carlson & Cari Higgins		
2009	Cari Higgins & Cassandra Holman	Jen Featheringill & Cristin Walker	Dana Feiss & Cj Boyenger

=== Women's Team Pursuit ===
Year	Gold	Silver	Bronze
2007	Dotsie Bausch, Jennie Reed & Sarah Hammer		
2008	Kimberly Geist, Alison Powers & Shannon Koch		
2009	Dotsie Bausch, Kimberly Geist & Sarah Hammer	Cari Higgins, Christen King & Shelley Olds	Jennifer Triplett, Jennifer Wheeler & Kendi Thomas

=== Junior Women's Team sprint ===
Year	Gold	Silver	Bronze
2009	Christine Barron & Coryn Rivera	Shelbe Eck & Colleen Gulick	Madalyn Godby & Shelby Reynolds
