= Wildlife Generation Pro Cycling =

American cycling team

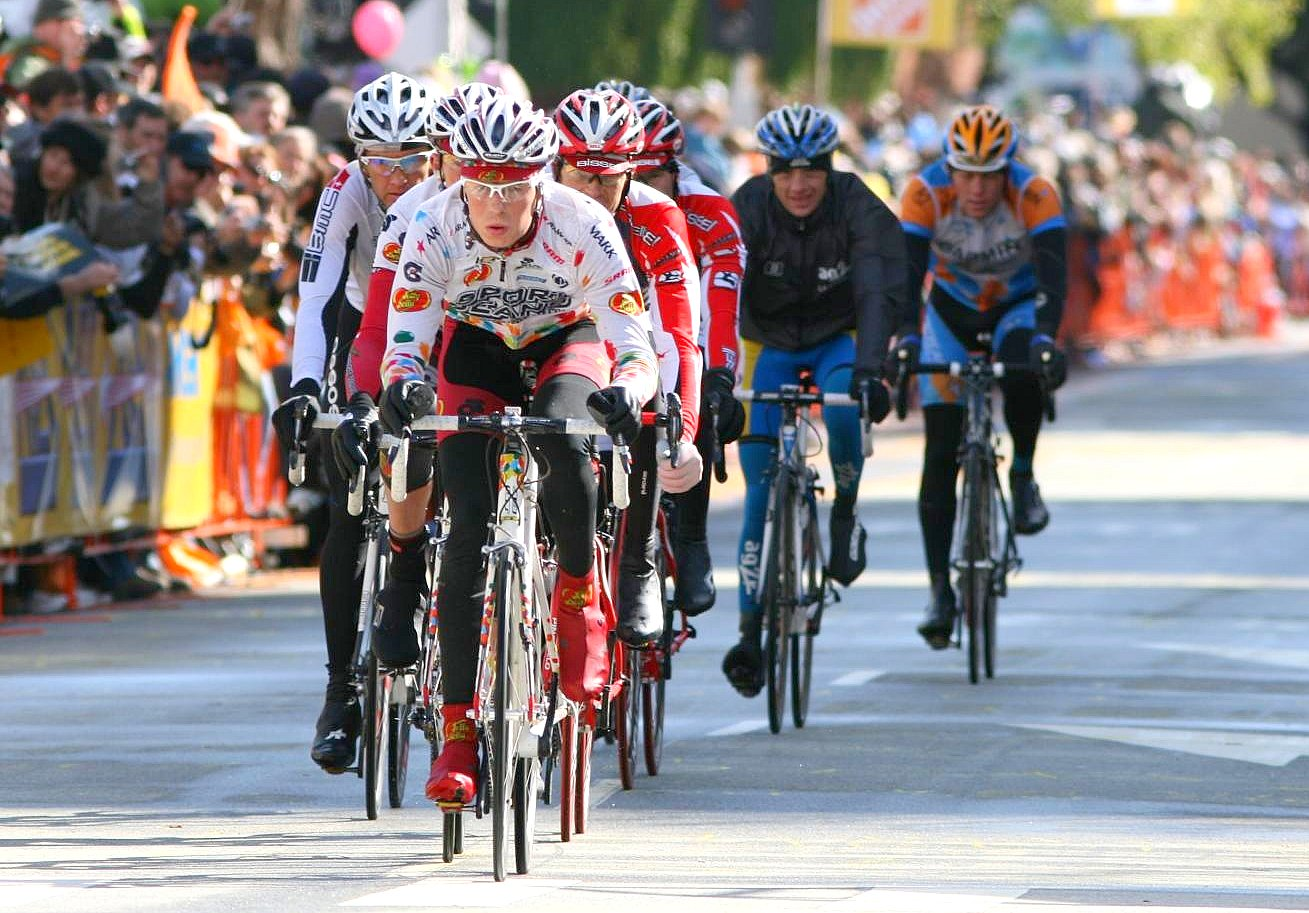
- Jelly Belly riders leading the peloton at the 2009 Tour of California

Team information
- UCI code: WGC
- Registered: United States
- Founded: 1999
- Disbanded: 2022
- Discipline: Road
- Status: Continental
- Website: Team home page

Key personnel
- Team manager: Danny Van Haute

Team name history
- 1999 2000–2001 2002–2003 2004 2005 2006–2009 2010–2011 2012 2013 2014–2018 2019 2020–2022: Ikon–Lexus; Jelly Belly Cycling Team; Jelly Belly–Carlsbad Clothing Company; Jelly Belly–Aramark; Jelly Belly–Pool Gel; Jelly Belly Cycling Team; Jelly Belly p/b Kenda; Jelly Belly Cycling Team; Jelly Belly p/b Kenda; Jelly Belly p/b Maxxis; Wildlife Generation Pro Cycling Team p/b Maxxis; Wildlife Generation Pro Cycling

Wildlife Generation Pro Cycling (UCI code: WGC) was an American professional cycling team. The squad was registered in the United States as a UCI Continental Team. For many years the team was sponsored by Jelly Belly, a candy manufacturer. The final title sponsor was Wildlife Generation, an American conservation organization.

== History ==
Founded as Ikon-Lexus, in 1999, Wildlife Generation Pro Cycling competed on the USA Cycling National Racing Calendar and the UCI America Tour. From 2000 to 2018, Jelly Belly sponsored the team, the longest-running domestic sponsorship. The team rode Focus Bikes, between 2010 and 2013. From 2014 to 2018, the team rode Argon 18 bicycles.

The team's most important victory was the 2013 United States National Road Race Championships when Fred Rodriguez won his record-breaking fourth title.

Notable riders who competed for the team include Fred Rodriguez, Jeremy Powers, Kiel Reijnen, Phil Gaimon, Mike Friedman, Carter Jones, Serghei Țvetcov, Matthew Lloyd, Ben Wolfe, Lachlan Morton and Curtis White.

== Team roster ==
As of February 14, 2022.

| Rider | Date of birth |
|---|---|
| Ulises Alfredo Castillo (MEX) | March 5, 1992 (age 34) |
| Jonathan Clarke (AUS) | December 18, 1984 (age 41) |
| Noah Granigan (USA) | January 18, 1996 (age 30) |
| Ryan Jastrab (USA) | July 17, 2000 (age 26) |
| Cormac McGeough (IRL) | August 11, 1996 (age 30) |

| Rider | Date of birth |
|---|---|
| Scott McGill (USA) | September 20, 1998 (age 27) |
| Ahmet Örken (TUR) | March 12, 1993 (age 33) |
| Brendan Rhim (USA) | December 19, 1995 (age 30) |
| Kent Ross (USA) | December 2, 1996 (age 29) |
| Serghei Țvetcov (ROM) | December 29, 1988 (age 37) |

== Major wins ==
1999
Stage 10 Vuelta a Guatemala, Chris Baldwin
2001
Stage 4 Tour of the Gila, Mariano Friedick
2002
Stage 1 International Tour de Toona, Jason McCartney
2003
Stage 2 Flèche du Sud, Mark Fitzgerald
2004
United States National Criterium Championships, Jonas Carney
Stage 2 Tour de Toona, Doug Ollerenshaw
Stage 4 Redlands Bicycle Classic, Alex Candelario
Stage 6 Cascade Classic, Alex Candelario
Stage 16 International Cycling Classic, Jonas Carney
2005
International Cycling Classic

Stages 3 & 15 Danny Pate
Stage 14 Brice Jones
Stage 17 Alex Candelario

2006
Overall Sea Otter Classic, Matthew Rice
International Cycling Classic

Stages 16 & 17 Alex Candelario
Stage 4 Brian Jensen

2007
Overall Redlands Bicycle Classic, Andrew Bajadali
Stage 4 Tour of the Gila, Brice Jones
2008
Stages 3 & 5 Tour of Hainan, Bradly Huff
Stage 3 Tour of Elk Grove, Bradly Huff
2009
Overall Tulsa Tough, Bradly Huff

Stages 1 & 2

Mount Washington Hillclimb, Phil Gaimon
Stage 14 International Cycling Classic, Bradly Huff
2010
Canadian National Road Race Championships, Will Routley
Overall Tulsa Tough, Bradly Huff

Stages 1 & 2 Bradly Huff

Overall Tour of Thailand, Kiel Reijnen

Stage 1 Kiel Reijnen

Overall Tour de Korea, Mike Friedman
Stage 1 Redlands Bicycle Classic, Will Routley
Stage 3 Tour of Hainan, Bradly Huff
2011
Stage 3 Nature Valley Grand Prix, Bernard Van Ulden
Stage 4 Tulsa Tough, Ken Hanson
Stage 9 Tour de Korea, Ken Hanson
2012
Mexican National Road Race Championships, Luis Enrique Lemus
Mexican National Under-23 Road Race Championships, Luis Enrique Lemus
Stage 3 Nature Valley Grand Prix, Bradly Huff
2013
United States National Road Race Championships, Fred Rodriguez
Mexican National Road Race Championships, Luis Enrique Lemus
Overall Cascade Cycling Classic, Serghei Tvetcov

Stages 2 & 4 Serghei Tvetcov

Overall Nature Valley Grand Prix, Serghei Tvetcov

Stage 1 Serghei Tvetcov
Stage 3 Sean Mazich

Stage 2 Sea Otter Classic, Alew Hagmen
2014
Overall Cascade Cycling Classic, Serghei Tvetcov

Stages 2 (ITT) & 4, Serghei Tvetcov

Stage 3 (ITT) Tour of the Gila, Serghei Tvetcov
Stage 2 Tour de Hokkaido, Luis Enrique Lemus
2016
Overall Tour of the Gila, Lachlan Morton

Stage 1 Lachlan Morton

Overall Tour of Utah, Lachlan Morton

Stage 3 Lachlan Morton
Stage 7 Lachlan Morton

Stage 4 Tour de Hokkaido, Lachlan Morton
2017
Stage 3 Colorado Classic, Serghei Tvetcov
2018
Stage 2 Tour de Beauce, Jack Burke
2019
Stage 2 Tour de Hokkaido, Stephen Bassett
2021
Grand Prix Erciyes - Mimar Sinan, Alex Hoehn
