= Colby Pearce =

American cyclist

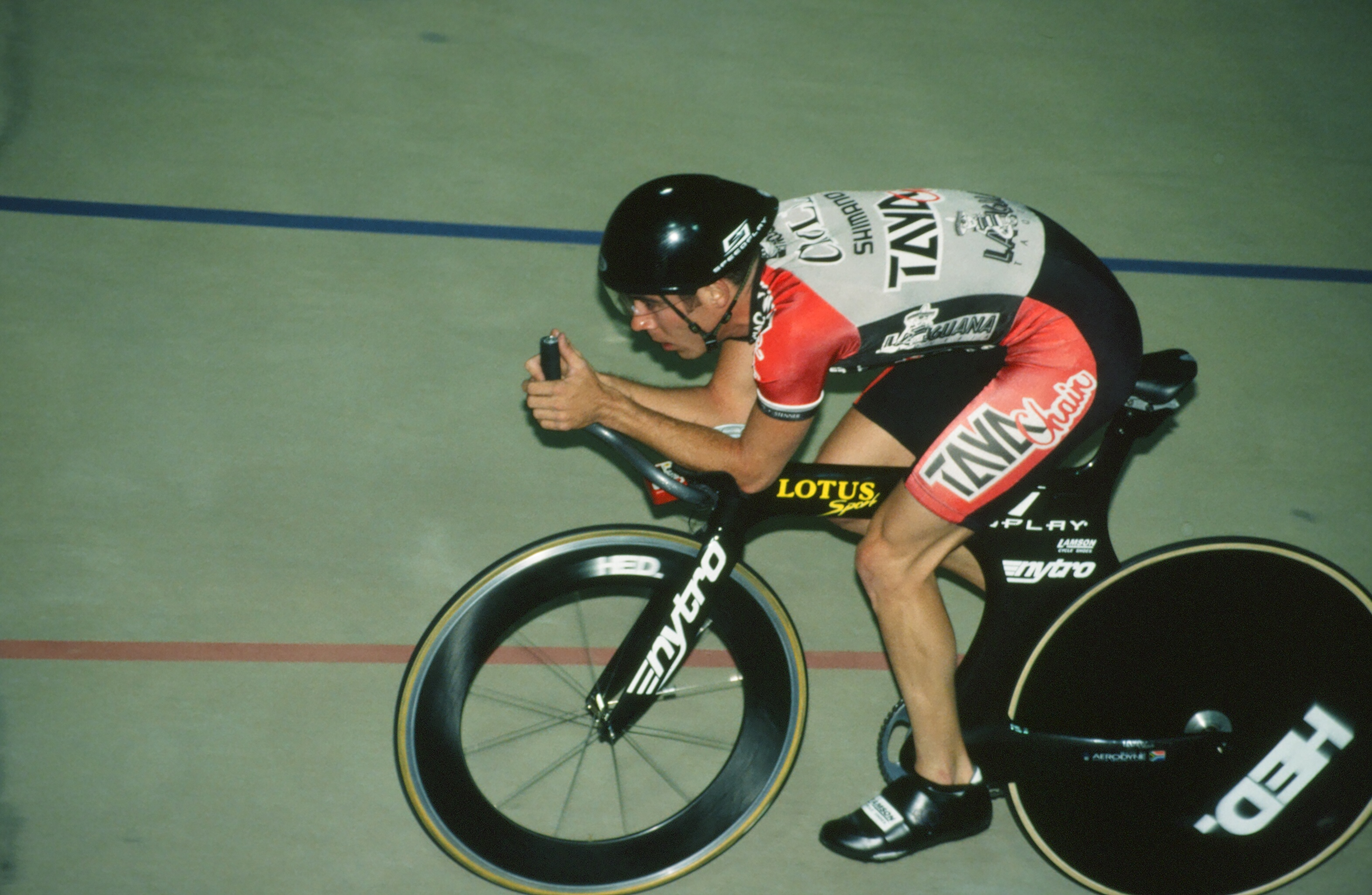

Personal information
- Full name: Colby Pearce
- Born: June 12, 1972 (age 54) Boulder, Colorado, U.S.
- Height: 1.75 m (5 ft 9 in)
- Weight: 63 kg (139 lb)

Cycling career
- Sport: Cycling
- Disciplines: Track & Road
- Role: Rider

Professional teams
- 1990-1995: Amateur
- 1996-1997: Shaklee professional cycling team
- 1998: Colorado Cyclist professional cycling team
- 1999-2000: Shaklee professional cycling team
- 2001: Prime Alliance professional cycling team
- 2002: Ofoto professional cycling team
- 2003: 5280 Magazine development team
- 2004: TIAA-CREF development team
- 2005-2007: Employed by USA Cycling
- 2008: Slipstream Chipotle
- 2009-2010: Big Shark cycling team
- 2011-2013: Horizon Organic / Panache Cyclewear team
Medal record
Representing United States
Pan American Games
Bronze medal – third place	2003 Santo Domingo	Madison

Colby Pearce (born June 12, 1972) is an American professional cyclist. Known as a time trial specialist, he excelled on the road and on the track, where he won a number of national and international events around the globe.

== Biography ==
Born in Boulder, Colorado, Pearce began riding in the Red Zinger Mini Classics series for 10–15 year olds in 1988. He rode his first race at what was to become his "home track", the USOTC velodrome in Colorado Springs, in 1990.

He competed at the 2004 Summer Olympics in Athens, finishing 14th in the points race.

In November 2005 he retired from the national team and became the US National Endurance Coach, saying he wanted to put something back into the sport. But in April 2007, he resigned from his position as coach to return to competitive cycling, although he would still be involved in developing the sport.

Colby Pearce continues to coach bike riders of all ages and experience in his hometown of Boulder, Colorado.

In February 2012, he trained with world-renowned bike fitter, Steve Hogg, in Australia.

== Career highlights ==
Pan-American Games bronze medalist
14-time National track Champion
(madison wins in 00, 01, 02, 05, 07, 08; team pursuit wins in 01, 02, 04, 07, 08; points race in 99 and 08; scratch race win in 03)

(United States) Former U.S. hour record holder, 50.191 km

(United States) Former U.S. record holder, 10 km, 20 km and 50 km

(United States) Current U.S. 10 km record holder 11'44.25

Six-time World Championship team member (2001-2005, 2008); One time Pan-Am games team member (03)

Eleven-time World Cup medalist (three victories; points race in Cali, Colombia in 02, scratch race in Mexico 04, and points race in Sydney 04)

1988 (16 years old)
5th overall, Red Zinger Mini Classic stage race

1989 (Junior 17 years old, first year licensed)
2nd State of Colorado Best All-Around rider competition JM 17-18
2nd CO state time trial championships, Staussberg, CO
4th CO state road race championships, Colorado Springs, CO
11th National time trial championships, Colorado Springs CO
18th National road race championships, Colorado Springs CO

1990 (Junior 18 yrs old with LeMond SVAA)
1st State of Colorado Best All-Around rider competition, JM 17-18
2nd National Championships, team time trial, 70km, Borrego Springs CA
2nd US Olympic Festival team time trial, 70km, Minneapolis MN
2nd Tour de L'abitibi, team time trial, Canada
5th National criterium championships, San Diego CA

1991 (amateur category 2)
1st State of Colorado Best All-Around rider competition SM 2
1st Tour of Guatemala, Stage 2 road race, Guatemala
1st Dyno Club 40km time trial, Colorado Springs CO
1st Collegiate national track championships, team competition, Northbrook IL

1992 (amateur category 1)
1st Cherry creek time trial, Denver CO
1st Wild Oats time trial, Denver CO
1st Colorado Cyclist regional track event, 4km pursuit, Colorado Springs CO
1st Collegiate national track championships, 4km team pursuit, Northbrook IL
2nd Collegiate national track championships, 4km individual pursuit, Northbrook IL

1993 (amateur category 1)
1st Colorado state time trial championships, 40km, Alamosa CO
1st Colorado state criterium championships, Gunnison CO
1st Strasbourg time trial, 40km, CO
2nd State of Colorado Best All-Around rider competition, SM 1
3rd La Vuelta a Venezuela, stage 8 time trial, Venezuela
3rd Mt. Haleakala time trial, 64km, Maui, HI
6th FBD Milk Ras Tour of Ireland road race stage 8, Ireland
18th FBD Milk Ras Tour of Ireland, G.C., 1300km, Ireland

1994 (amateur category 1)
1st KTCL criterium series, overall, Boulder CO
1st Colorado State road race championships, Akron CO
3rd National time trial championships, 40km, Seattle WA
4th La Vuelta de Guatemala, stage 7 circuit race, Guatemala
6th Kermeese, 120km, Gent, Belgium 5/29/94
11th FBD Milk Ras Tour of Ireland overall, 1300km, Ireland

1995 Taya Chain cycling team (amateur category 1)
US national record, 50.191km in 1 hour, Colorado Springs, CO, 9/31/95
US national record, 50 km in 59:46, Colorado Springs, CO, 9/31/95
US national record, 20 km in 23:50, Colorado Springs, CO, 9/31/95
US national record, 10 km in 11:55, Colorado Springs, CO, 9/31/95
1st Moriarty record challenge time trial, 40km, (47:47), Moriarty NM
1st Route 66 stage race overall, Gallup NM
1st Colorado district time trial championships, 40 km, Straussberg CO
2nd Hotter n' Hell stage race overall, Wichita Falls TX
2nd Cascade Cycling Classic, stage 1 time trial, Bend OR
3rd La Vuelta de Bisbee, stage 5 time trial, Bisbee AZ
5th Tour of the Gila, stage 1 time trial, Silver City NM
6th National time trial championships, 40km, Seattle WA

1996 Team Shaklee (first year professional)
2nd Moriarty record challenge time trial, Moriarty NM
2nd Red River stage race, stage 2 time trial, Boulder CO
3rd 89er stage race, stage 3 time trial, Norman OK
9th U.S. Olympic Trials time trial WV

1997 Team Shaklee (UCI tier 3)
US National record, 10km in 11:44.25, Colo. Springs CO
1st Downtown Boulder criterium, Boulder CO
1st Colorado Classic stage race, stage 3 time trial, Boulder CO
3rd National Time Trial Championships, Altoona PA

1998 Colorado Cyclist (independent pro)
1st Mead Criterium, Mead CO
1st Platte Bridge Station stage race, stage 4 criterium, Casper WY
2nd Usery Pass road race, Phoenix AZ
3rd Fitchburg stage race, stage 4 criterium, Fitchburg MA
20th Outdoor Life Atlanta Gran Prix, Atlanta GA

1999 Team Shaklee (UCI tier 3)
1st US National Track Championships, Points Race, Trexlertown PA
1st stage 1, Boulder Beer stage race, time trial, Boulder CO
2nd US National team pursuit championships, Trexlertown PA
2nd overall, Boulder Beer stage race, Boulder CO
2nd stage 1 Tour of Ireland, Dublin-Waterford
3rd US National madison championships, Trexlertown PA
3rd stage 3, road race, Tour of Willamette, Eugene OR
3rd overall, Tour of Ireland (1300km stage race)
10th World Cup points race, Fiorenzuola Italy

2000 Team Shaklee (UCI tier 3)
1st (United States) Madison, US National Track Championships, Elite (with Michael Tillman)
1st Grand Prix Bermuda stage race, overall, Bermuda
1st EDS Cup: points race, individual pursuit, team pursuit, Blaine MN
1st EDS Cup madison, Monterey CA
2nd US National Championships, points race, Colorado Springs, CO
2nd US National Championships, team pursuit, Colorado Springs, CO
3rd UCI World Cup points race, Malaysia

2001 Prime Alliance cycling team (UCI tier 3)
1st (United States) Team Pursuit, US National Track Championships, Elite (with James Carney, Jonas Carney & Ryan Miller)
1st (United States) Madison, US National Track Championships, Elite (with James Carney)
2nd US National Championships, points race, Blaine MN
2nd UCI World Cup madison, Malaysia
3rd Goodwill Games, madison, Brisbane Australia
5th Goodwill Games, points race, Brisbane Australia
14th UCI World Championships, madison, Antwerp Belgium

2002 Ofoto/ Lombardi Sport cycling team (UCI tier 3)
2002 UCI World Cup points race champion, overall
1st UCI World Cup points race, Cali, Colombia
1st (United States) Team Pursuit, US National Track Championships, Elite (with James Carney, Kenny Williams & Michael Tillman)
1st (United States) Madison, US National Track Championships, Elite (with James Carney)
2nd UCI World Cup points race, Kunming China
2nd UCI World Cup madison, Kunming China
3rd UCI World Cup madison, Cali, Colombia
14th UCI World Championships, points race, Copenhagen Denmark

2003 (Ofoto/Lombardi Sports team on track; Rider/Manager, 5280/Subaru cycling team on road)
1st (United States) Scratch race, US National Track Championships, Elite
1st US Worlds/Pan Am Games trials, points race, Colorado Springs CO
1st US Worlds/Pan Am Games trials, points race, Colorado Springs CO
1st Madison Cup, Trexlertown PA
1st Colorado State time trial championships, Denver CO
2nd Madison, US National Track Championships, Elite (with Jonas Carney)
2nd General Classification Ecology Center Classic Montana
2nd Madison, US National Track Championships, Elite
2nd Points race, US National Track Championships, Elite
3rd Bronze Medal, Pan-Am Games, Madison, Santo Domingo, Dominican Republic
5th Pan-Am Games, road race, Santo Domingo Dominican Republic
5th Pan-Am Games, points race, Santo Domingo Dominican Republic
8th UCI World Cup madison, Sydney Australia
10th UCI World Cup points race, Sydney Australia
12th UCI World Championships, points race, Stuttgart Germany

2004 (Team TIAA-CREF)
1st Scratch race, Aguascalientes, Mexico 2004 Track World Cup
1st Points race, Sydney, Australia 2004 Track World Cup
1st (United States) Team pursuit, US National Track Championships, Elite (with James Carney,

Robert Lea & Guillaume Nelessen)

2nd Madison, US National Track Championships, Elite (with Jonas Carney)
2nd Points race, US National Track Championships, Elite
2nd Points race, Round 2, Los Angeles, 2004–2005 Track World Cup
3rd Points race, Manchester, England 2004 Track World Cup
11th, GC Southland Tour of New Zealand (2nd stage 4, 4th stage 7)
14th, Olympic Games points race, Athens, Greece

2005
1st (United States) Madison, US National Track Championships, Elite (with Chad Hartley)
2nd Points race, Round 1, Moscow, Russia, 2005–2006 Track World Cup
2nd Team pursuit, US National Track Championships, Elite (with Kenny Williams, Charles Bradley Huff & Curtis Gunn)
3rd Points race, Round 3, Manchester, England, 2004–2005 Track World Cup
3rd Team Pursuit, US National Track Championships, Elite
10th, UCI World Championship madison, Los Angeles
14th UCI World Championship points race, Los Angeles

2007 (Cody Racing)
1st Madison, Pan American Championships, Elite
1st (United States) Team Pursuit, US National Track Championships, Elite (with Charles Bradley Huff, Michael Friedman & Michael Creed)
1st (United States) Madison, US National Track Championships, Elite (with Robert Lea)
1st Revolution 19 points race, Manchester, England
1st overall Tour of Christiana, PA
1st Tour of Christiana road race, PA
5th, Continental Championships, points race, Caracas, Venezuela
6th UCI World Cup, madison, Beijing, China

2008 (Team Slipstream/Chipotle P/B H30)
1st (United States) Madison, US National Track Championships, Elite (with Daniel Holloway)
1st (United States) Team Pursuit, US National Track Championships, Elite (with Taylor Phinney, Daniel Holloway & Charles Bradley Huff)
1st (United States) Points Race, US National Track Championships
1st UCI Madison Cup, Trexlertown PA
1st Giro Della Montagna criterium, St Louis, MO
2nd UCI World Cup, madison, Copenhagen, DEN
2nd Burnaby six day, Burnaby, CAN
3rd Elite US National Championships, time trial, Anaheim
5th UCI World Cup, points race, Copenhagen, Denmark
5th UCI World Cup, madison, Los Angeles, CA
9th US National Championship Firecracker 50, Breckenridge CO
10th Copenhagen 6 day, Copenhagen, DEN

2009
1st Bannock criterium, Denver, CO
1st Giro Della Montange criterium, St Louis Gateway Cup, MO
6th World Points Race Championships, Warsaw, Poland
7th 6 Days of Zurich, Switzerland
8th World Madison Championships, Warsaw, Poland
8th 6 Days of Zuidlaren, The Netherlands
9th 6 Days of Dortmund, Germany
10th Copenhagen 6 Day, Denmark

2010
7th Six Days of Copenhagen 7th (with Daniel Holloway)
9th UCI Track World Championships Copenhagen, DEN madison: 9th (with Daniel Holloway)

2013 (Horizon Organic p/b Panache Cyclewear)
USAC 40-44 Hour Record (best performance) 49.806 Colorado Springs, CO 9/30
USAC 40-44 Hour Record (absolute) 46.452 Colorado Springs, CO 9.30
1st Steamboat Springs Stage Race CO
