= Sky Christopherson =

American athlete and entrepreneur

- Born: January 19, 1976 (age 50); United States
- Employer(s): GOLD AI, Biolinq
- Known for: World Record Holder, entrepreneur, public speaker world record in sprint cycling

Sky Christopherson (born January 19, 1976) is an American entrepreneur, world record holder, and motivational speaker. He has been covered by Fortune Forbes, Sports Illustrated, Wired, Outside magazine, the Financial Times, and other publications. In 2015 he was voted 5th nationwide in "Top 40 under 40 in Healthcare Innovation"

A member of the U.S. Cycling Team, an alternate for the 1996 Olympic Team and, Christopherson is known for breaking a world record in 2011 in the velodrome sprint, notably using a 'digital health' model inspired by Dr. Eric Topol. The previous holder of the record, Steven Alfred, subsequently received a lifetime ban for performance-enhancing drug use.

Christopherson founded the $8million dollar software platform Vicaso in 2007, and the biometrics and big data health company Optimized Athlete in 2012, which helped the underdog 2012 women's cycling team win medals at the London Olympics when Lance Armstrong and the men's team were banned for drugs. The story was featured in the feature documentary Personal Gold: An Underdog Story.

== Early life ==
Sky Christopherson was born on January 19, 1976 to American parents, and raised by his parents in Tucson, Arizona in the United States. He had an early interest in both sports, film, and technology, using a Sears video camera to create 3D playback when he was eight years old.

== Cycling career ==
Cycling Stats
Personal information
- Born: United States

Cycling career
- Sport: Cycling
- Current team: Retired
- Role: Rider
- Rider type: Sprinter

Amateur team
- 1980s-1993: -

Professional team
- 1995-2000: U.S. National Cycling Team

Major wins
- World Record(s) 35+ 200m velodrome sprint 2000 Olympic Trials: Gold 1km, Gold Team Sprint.

=== Early years ===
Christopherson won his first national title in bicycle racing at age 19, beating a six-time undefeated cyclist in a controversial event at the 1995 US National Championships. His specialty was the 1,000-meter time trial, considered to be the most painful event in sprint cycling. Christopherson is one of five Americans in history to ride a sub 1:03.0 in the 1000m 'Kilometer' event. He was quoted "My blood was turned into battery acid...I would commonly ride that fine line of losing consciousness."

Project 96: Atlanta Olympics

He was named to the U.S. National Cycling Team in 1995 following a win of two national titles at the U.S. National Track Cycling Championships. Accordingly, he was made part of 'Project 96' to prepare for the 1996 Atlanta Olympics. The program included experimental 'Hyperoxic' training using enriched oxygen at the U.S. Olympic Training Center. During the special training conduced by Randy Wilbur and Dave Morris, Christopherson broke a record at the US Olympic Training center for highest blood lactate ever measured at 31.5 mmol/dl. He was named official alternate to the 1996 Atlanta Olympic Cycling Team after placing second at the trials to Olympic medalist Erin Hartwell.

Union Cycliste Internationale

He made his international debut in the 1000m placing 6th at the 1996 UCI Track Cycling World Cup in Cali, Colombia. When racing at the international level, he never ranked lower than ninth in the world. He placed 4th at the 1997 UCI Track Cycling World Cup in Adelaide, Australia, and 9th at the 1997 UCI World Track Cycling Championships. In 1998, he transitioned to the Team Sprint event with Marty Nothstein and Erin Hartwell, winning Silver at the 1998 UCI Track Cycling World Cup Classics in Victoria, British Columbia, Canada, and 4th at the 1998 UCI Track Cycling World Championships in Bordeaux, France.

Later Olympics

He battled upper respiratory illnesses throughout the 1998 and 1999 seasons, developing walking pneumonia in 1999.

In 2000, Christopherson won the U.S. Olympic Trials in Frisco, Texas, in the 1000m and Team Sprint Events, and was named alternate to the 2000 Sydney Olympic Team allowed through new rules.

Following the closing ceremonies at the 2000 Sydney Olympics, he proposed to his girlfriend Tamara Jenkins, an Olympian in flatwater kayaking.

He continued training for the 2004 Athens Olympics, but after breaking his femur in a bike crash, decided to retire from competitive racing. He joined the Washington Athletic Club in January 2007, where he helped to create "the program that will be giving sponsorship to athletes training for the Olympics."

=== World record ===
In 2010 he made a bid to return to the 2012 London Olympics, notable by his use of a 'digital health' model inspired by Dr. Eric Topol. The project was a subject of a TEDx talk Christopherson gave in Del Mar, California, and a Quantified Self talk at the Google headquarters in Mountain View, California.

The training led to a world record in the 35+ 200m velodrome sprint. The previous record holder Steven Alfred received a lifetime ban for use of performance-enhancing drugs. When asked how he trained, Christopherson stated, "In prior efforts we did not have the ability to formulate such a complete picture with data amassed continuously 24/7. This time around I benefited from genetic testing, sleep data, glucose tracking, etc."

== Business career ==
=== Vicaso ===
Upon retirement, Christopherson began attending UC San Diego (UCSD), where he studied Intradiscpliary Computing and the Arts, and graduated in 2006. In 2007, upon graduating UCSD, he founded Vicaso, a software platform for mass production of HDR imagery with the market application of real estate marketing. Headquartered in Seattle, UCSD has stated "the startup was wildly successful, turning over $1.2 million in its first year." and over $8 million since. The company was exclusive national provider to Redfin, and now works with brokerages such as Prudential, Sotheby's, Coldwell Banker, among others. It specializes in software based automation of high dynamic range (HDR) photography.

=== Optimized Athlete ===
In July 2012 The Financial Times revealed that several health technology companies have supplied Olympics athletes with devices intended to optimize their performance, in what CNN said some people were calling the "Data Olympics."

OAthlete, a company co-founded by Christopherson, and another athlete earlier that year, helped the US track cycling team (specifically the women's sprint cycling team) track their health with a software platform that he developed to collect athlete data including the first non-diabetic use of glucose monitors, sleep monitor, and genetic reports indicating nutritional needs and muscular capacity.

About using the method, Christopherson stated, "When we arrived in Spain [to consult for OAthlete] we met a [US track cycling team] that had become America's medal hopes in cycling when Lance Armstrong and then men's team were banned for performance enhancing drug use. What unfolded was amazing." We began to assemble a big-data portrait of each athlete's health and fitness through a partnership with San Francisco based Datameer and software developed by Christopherson and former Olympic teammate Adam Laurent. The team won an 'underdog' Silver Medal at the 2012 London Olympic Games in the Women's Team Pursuit. It was the first US women's track cycling medal in over 20 years.

The story was featured in the feature documentary Personal Gold: An Underdog Story, which was acquired by Netflix and received worldwide distribution. Optimized Athlete has since been rolled into the company GOLD AI.

=== GOLD AI ===
On August 1 at the 2024 Paris Olympics, the company GOLD AI was launched as "the world's first artificial intelligence platform bridging Olympic medal-winning advice for consumer health and fitness".

== Personal life ==
Sky Christopherson's parents live in Tucson, Arizona.

== Athletic achievements ==
1995
Gold, Kilometer, U.S National Track Cycling Championships, Indianapolis, Indiana
Gold, Team Sprint, U.S. National Track Cycling Championships, Indianapolis, Indiana
1996
Record for highest blood lactate (31.5mmol/dl) recorded by the US Olympic Training Center
6th, Kilometer, Round 1, 1996 Track World Cup, Cali
4th, Team Sprint, Round 1, 1996 Track World Cup, Cali
7th, Kilometer, Round 2, 1996 Track World Cup, Havana
5th, Team Sprint, Round 2, 1996 Track World Cup, Havana
1997
4th, Kilometer, Round 6, 1997 Track World Cup, Adelaide
1998
Gold, Team Sprint, Pan American Cycling Championships, Sao Paulo, Brazil
2nd, Team Sprint, Round 1, 1998 UCI Track Cycling World Cup Classics, Victoria
4th, Team Sprint, UCI World Track Cycling Championships, Bordeaux, France
2000
Gold, Kilo, US Olympic Trials, Track Cycling, Frisco, Texas
Gold, Team Sprint, US Olympic Trials, Track Cycling, Frisco, Texas
7th, Kilometer, Round 1, 2000 Track World Cup, Cali
2001
Gold, Team Sprint, 2001 U.S. National Track Cycling Championships, Blaine, Minnesota
2011
World Record, 35+ 200m Time Trial, Colorado Springs, Colorado (August 20, 2011)

== See also ==
- Free-diving in fiction
