= Derek Bouchard-Hall =

American cyclist

Personal information
- Born: July 16, 1970 (age 55) Port Hueneme, California, United States

Sport
- Sport: Cycling
Medal record
Representing United States
Pan American Games
Gold medal – first place	1999 Winnipeg	Team pursuit

Derek Albert Bouchard-Hall (born July 16, 1970) is a former US professional cyclist, whose career highlights include winning the gold medal in the team pursuit at the 1999 Pan American Games, winning the 2000 United States National Criterium Championships, and competing on the 2000 US Olympic team in Sydney, Australia. In September 2023, he was named CEO of POC.

== Early life ==
Derek Albert Bouchard-Hall was born at the naval base in Port Hueneme, CA, where his naval officer father was based. He spent most of his childhood in Norton, MA, where he graduated as valedictorian from Norton High School in 1988. Though a successful runner in high school, a foot injury led Bouchard-Hall to pursue cycling at Princeton University. Bouchard-Hall graduated from Princeton in 1992, with a degree in Architectural Engineering, then moved to the West Coast to attend Stanford University.

Bouchard-Hall graduated from Stanford in 1994 with an MS in Structural Engineering and began his professional cycling career, signing with Team Shaklee. Shaklee teammates introduced Bouchard-Hall to track cycling, and he soon began to train with the US track cycling team. From 1996–2000, Bouchard-Hall divided his cycling calendar into training and competing for both his professional road cycling team and for the US National track cycling team.

== Career ==
In 1998, Bouchard-Hall moved from Team Shaklee to the newly formed Mercury Cycling Team, where he competed both domestically and internationally. It was as a member of the Mercury team where Bouchard-Hall achieved his greatest road successes, winning the United States National Criterium Championships in 2000 and competing in Paris–Roubaix, Gent–Wevelgem, and Critérium International.

In 1999, Bouchard-Hall was a member of the gold medal winning team pursuit squad at the Pan American Games in Winnipeg, Canada. In 2000, Bouchard-Hall achieved another career highlight when he was selected as a member of the US Olympic team, to compete in the track cycling team pursuit event, after winning the US National Championship in the team pursuit with Erin Hartwell, Mariano Friedick, and Tommy Mulkey. At the 2000 Sydney Olympics, Bouchard-Hall and the US team pursuit team finished in 10th place. Bouchard-Hall continued to cycle for Mercury until the 2002 cycling season, when he announced his retirement at the age of 32 during the US Road Championships in Philadelphia, PA., in June. At the time, Mercury was ranked #1 in the NRC team standings.

Exterior and Common Iliac Endofibrosis

Toward the end of his cycling career, Bouchard-Hall began experiencing pain and loss of strength in his left leg when he was training. After months of various medical and physio examinations, and through his own extensive research, he sought the advice of a vascular surgeon at the Mayo Clinic in Rochester, MN. Bouchard-Hall underwent surgery at Stanford University Medical Center to correct the problem in the winter of 2000, which ultimately led to his most successful year as a professional cyclist. In 2002, however, the pain and numbness in his leg returned, and, rather than risking a second highly invasive surgery, he retired.

== Post-cycling career ==
From 2002–2004, Bouchard-Hall attended Harvard Business School, graduating with an MBA in 2004, and began working in management consulting, first in Boston and then, in 2006, for McKinsey and Company in London. In 2009–2010, he served as interim director of the US Small Business Administration's HUBZone program, in Washington, DC, before returning to London in the summer of 2010. In October 2011, Bouchard-Hall has been an executive with Wiggle Ltd, one of the world's largest internet retailers of cycling, running, and triathlon equipment. Bouchard-Hall went on to serve as President and CEO of USA Cycling from 2015-2018, and more recently held the post of CEO of Assos of Switzerland from 2019-2023.

== Personal ==
Bouchard-Hall is married with two children and resides in Ticino, Switzerland.

== Results ==
Professional Cycling Resume

1994

- 1st in Prologue Tour de Toona, United States of America

1995

- 3rd in National Championship, Track, Points race, Elite, United States of America, USA
- 2nd in National Championship, Track, Elimination, Elite, United States of America, USA
- 2nd in National Championship, Track, Scratch, Elite, United States of America, USA

1996

- 1st in Prologue Norman, United States of America
- 1st in Stage 3 Wichita Falls Race, United States of America
- 5th in National Championship, Road, Criterium, Elite, United States of America, Downers Grove (Illinois), USA

1997

- 1st in Prologue Stage Race Norman, USA
- 1st in Stage 2 Merced, USA
- 3rd in Stage 1 Redlands Bicycle Classic, Highland (California), USA

1998

- 1st in Los Gatos, USA
- 2nd in Prologue Redlands Bicycle Classic, Highland (California), USA
- 3rd in Stage 1 Redlands Bicycle Classic, Highland (California), USA

1999

- 3rd in Downers Grove, USA
- 1st in Stage 4 Fitchburg Longsjo Classic, USA
- 1st in Merced, USA
- 1st in Prologue Tour of Willamette, USA
- 2nd in Stage 2 Merced, USA
- 1st in Pescadero, USA
- 2nd in National Championship, Road, Criterium, Elite, United States of America, Downers Grove (Illinois), USA
- 3rd in Stage 6 Trans Canada, Canada

2000

- 1st in Downers Grove, USA
- 2nd in Natchez, USA
- 1st in National Championship, Track, Team Pursuit, Elite, United States of America, USA (w/Erin Hartwell, Mariano Friedick, Tommy Mulkey)
- 1st in Santa Rosa, Criterium, USA
- 3rd in Milton, USA
- 1st in Pescadero, United States of America
- 2nd in Stage 4 Cascade Classic, Bend (Oregon), USA
- 3rd in Stage 6 Cascade Classic, Bend (Oregon), USA
- 2nd in Stage 1 Tour de Toona, USA
- 3rd in Stage 3 Tour de Toona, Hollidaysburg (Pennsylvania), USA
- 1st in National Championship, Road, Criterium, Elite, United States of America, Downers Grove (Illinois), USA

2001

- 1st in Extran Challenge, USA
- 1st in Stage 1 Valley of the Sun Stage Race, USA
- 2nd in Snelling, USA
- 1st in Tour of the Hilltowns, USA
- 1st in Attleboro, USA
- 1st in Stage 5 Wendy's International Cycling Classic, USA
- 2nd in General Classification Wendy's International Cycling Classic, USA
- 1st in Concord, USA
- 1st in Bow, USA
- 2nd in National Championship, Road, Criterium, Elite, United States of America, USA

2002

- 1st in Cantua Creek, USA
- 3rd in Dinuba, Criterium, USA
