= Saturn Cycling Team =

American cycling team

Team information
- Founded: 1992
- Disbanded: 2003
- Disciplines: Road, cyclo-cross

Key personnel
- General manager: Tom Schuler

Team name history
1992–1993	Saturn - Kestrel
1994	Saturn - Trek
1995–1998	Saturn
1999–2003	Saturn Cycling Team

The Saturn Cycling Team was an American cycling team, sponsored by the Saturn Corporation car company. The team existed from 1992 to 2003. It was originally created and managed by Warren Gibson of Los Gatos, CA. In 1993 former 7-Eleven rider and US Pro road champion, Tom Schuler took over the team until it disbanded in 2003.

== History ==
For the 2003 season Saturn recruited top US cyclist Chris Horner, Tom Danielson and Phil Zajicek to lead the team. In September 2003 Saturn Corporation announced it would no longer be sponsoring the team, Tom Schuler tried looking for a new sponsor but ultimately could not find one.

== Victories ==
1993
Stage 4 Vuelta de Bisbee, Brian Walton
United States National Time Trial, Scott Mercier
Prologue Ruta Mexico, Clark Sheehan
Herald Sun Tour

Stage 6, Scott Fortner
Stage 9, Brian Walton

Stage 6 Alpine Classic, Scott Fortner
1994
Stage 14 Herald Sun Tour, Nate Reiss
1995
United States National Road Race, Norman Alvis
Stage 2 Valley of the Sun Stage Race, Brian Walton
Redlands Bicycle Classic

Stage 1, Michael McCarthy
Stage 5, Ron Kiefel

Road race, Pan American Road Championships, Brian Walton
Road race, Pan American Games, Brian Walton
Stage 2 West Virginia Classic, Bart Bowen
Philadelphia International Cycling Classic, Norman Alvis
Norwest Cycling Cup, Frank McCormack
United States National Criterium, Frank McCormack
Overall Killington Stage Race, Frank McCormack

Stage 2, Frank McCormack

Herald Sun Tour

Stage 3, Norman Alvis
Stage 9, Scott Mercier

1996
Giro del Capo, Scott Mercier
Tour de Toona, Scott Mercier
International Cycling Classic, Fred Rodriguez

1997
United States National Road Race Championships, Bart Bowen
United States National Cyclo-cross Championships, Mark McCormack
Herald Sun Tour, Norman Alvis
Tour de Toona, Norman Alvis
Tour of Japan, Bart Bowen

1998
International Cycling Classic, Frank McCormack
Tour of Japan, Frank McCormack
Fitchburg Longsjo Classic, Frank McCormack

1999
Fitchburg Longsjo Classic, Bart Bowen
Tour de Beauce, Levi Leipheimer
Sea Otter Classic, Frank McCormack

2000
Joe Martin Stage Race, Erin Hartwell
Lancaster Classic, Trent Klasna
Killington Stage Race, Chris Wherry

2001
United States National Time Trial Championships, Trent Klasna
Canadian National Time Trial Championships, Eric Wohlberg
United States National Criterium Championships, Harm Jansen
Tour de Toona, Harm Jansen
Redlands Bicycle Classic, Trent Klasna
Sea Otter Classic, Trent Klasna
Nature Valley Grand Prix, Frank McCormack
Fitchburg Longsjo Classic, Eric Wohlberg
Mount Washington Hillclimb, Tim Johnson

2002
Canadian National Road Race Championships, Eric Wohlberg
GP Weltour, Chris Fisher
International Cycling Classic, Viktor Rapinski
Tour de Nez, Eric Wohlberg

2003
United States National Road Race Championships, Mark McCormack
Canadian National Time Trial Championships, Eric Wohlberg
Sea Otter Classic, Nathan O'Neill
Fitchburg Longsjo Classic, Viktor Rapinski
International Cycling Classic, Viktor Rapinski
Redlands Bicycle Classic, Chris Horner
Tour de Georgia, Chris Horner
Herald Sun Tour, Tim Johnson
Nature Valley Grand Prix, Trent Klasna
Cascade Cycling Classic, Tom Danielson
Mount Washington Hillclimb, Tom Danielson
Pomona Valley Stage Race, Tom Danielson
Tour de Langkawi, Tom Danielson
Tour de Toona, Tom Danielson
Tour de Delta, William Frischkorn
San Francisco Grand Prix, Chris Horner

=== National champions ===
1993
American Time Trial, Scott Mercier
1995
American Criterium, Frank McCormack

== List of riders ==
Name	Birth date	Nationality	Years
Matthew Anand	01/10/1971	Canada	1999
Norman Alvis	12/07/1963	United States	1995-1998
Rahsaan Bahati	13/02/1982	United States	2002-2003
Darren Hugh Baker	13/06/1967	United States	1994
Michael Barry	18/12/1975	Canada	1999-2001
Steve Bauer	12/06/1959	Canada	1996
Bart Bowen	22/04/1967	United States	1994-2000
Jonas Carney	03/02/1971	United States	1994-1995
Taylor Centauri	10/09/1971	United States	1994-1995
Antonio Cruz	31/10/1971	United States	2000
Tom Danielson	13/03/1978	United States	2003
Matthew Decanio	05/04/1977	United States	2001
Charles Dionne	15/03/1979	United States	2003
Iván Domínguez	28/05/1976	Cuba	2001-2003
Jeff Evanshine	02/10/1973	United States	1996-1997
Christopher Fischer	04/07/1969	United States	2001-2002
Scott Fortner	22/05/1966	United States	1993-1998
Esteban Fraga	06/01/1965	Ecuador	1994
Mariano Friedick	09/01/1975	United States	1997-1998
William Frischkorn	10/06/1981	United States	2002-2003
Jimmy Hansen	17/08/1978	Denmark	1999
Erin Hartwell	01/06/1969	United States	2000-2001
Steve Hegg	03/12/1963	United States	1997
Chris Horner	23/10/1971	United States	2003
Harm Jansen	08/11/1967	Netherlands	2000-2002
Tim Johnson	05/08/1977	United States	2001-2003
Ron Kiefel	11/04/1960	United States	1994-1995
Trent Klasna	09/12/1969	United States	2000-2003
Damon Kluck	23/06/1977	United States	2002
Levi Leipheimer	24/10/1973	United States	1998-1999
John Loehner	27/07/1968	United States	1993
Mike McCarthy	20/06/1968	United States	1995-1998
David Mac Cook	24/12/1969	United States	1993
Frank McCormack	28/05/1969	United States	1995-2002
Mark McCormack	15/09/1970	United States	1996-2003
Steve Scott McGregor	29/10/1968	United States	1994
Scott McKinley	15/10/1968	United States	1995-1996
Chann McRae	11/10/1971	United States	1997-1998
Tommy Matush	12/03/1968	United States	1993
Scott Mercier	24/01/1968	United States	1993-1996
Andrew Miller	12/03/1968	United States	1993
Bob Mionske	26/04/1962	United States	1993
Jan Neal	27/10/1974	United States	1993
Nathan O'Neill	23/11/1974	United States	2003
Seth Pelusi	27/11/1976	United States	1999-2000
Soren Petersen	07/10/1967	Denmark	2001-2002
Viktor Rapinski	17/06/1981	Belarus	2002-2003
Nate Reiss	07/10/1963	United States	1994
Fred Rodriguez	03/09/1973	United States	1996-1998
Adham Sbeih	08/06/1963	United States	1999
Chris Sheehan	28/02/1969	United States	1993
Clark Sheehan	07/04/1969	United States	1993
Gregory Strock	30/05/1972	United States	1993
Peter Stubenrauch	26/10/1969	United States	1993
Jose Hernandez	22/02/1974	Mexico	2002-2003
Jay Sweet	11/08/1975	Australia	2002
Tim Swift	25/01/1964	United States	1994-1995
Burke Swindlehurst	10/03/1973	United States	1999
Fernando Tapia	08/07/1973	Mexico	1994
Robbie Ventura	05/05/1971	United States	1994-1995, 1999-2000
Brian Walton	18/12/1975	Canada	1993-2000
Chris Wherry	18/07/1973	United States	1997-2000
Eric Wohlberg	08/01/1965	Canada	2001-2003
Philip Zajicek	20/03/1979	United States	2003
