= List of 1998 UCI Women's Teams =

Listed below are the 1998 UCI Women's Teams that competed in 1998 women's road cycling events organized by the International Cycling Union (UCI).

UCI code	Team Name	Country
ADO	Acca Due O–Lorena Camice	Lithuania
	ASPTT Moselle Champion	
EBL	Ebly	France
EDI	Edil Savino	Italy
HAR	Hartol	Netherlands
	Mazza Team Feminin	Switzerland
	Mimosa	Italy
	Mutuelle de France	France
	O.M.T.	
	Quebec Air Transat	Canada
	Saeco–Timex	Italy
MIC	S.C. Michela Fanin Record Rox	Italy
SAT	Saturn Cycling Team	United States
SER	Serotta World Team	Switzerland
	Vizir–Isoglass	
