= Jonas Carney =

American cyclist (born 1971)

Personal information
- Full name: Jonas Carney
- Born: February 3, 1971 (age 55)

Cycling career
- Sport: Cycling
- Current team: Retired
- Disciplines: Road; Track
- Role: Rider (retired); Directeur sportif

Professional teams
- 1992–1993: Coors Light
- 1994–1995: Saturn
- 1996–2000: Team Shaklee
- 2001–2003: Prime Alliance
- 2004: Jelly Belly–Aramark

Managerial teams
- 2007–2023: Kelly Benefit Strategies–Medifast (men)
- 2016–2023: Rally Cycling (women)

Jonas Carney (born February 3, 1971) is an American former professional cyclist. After from competition he has directed the men's Human Powered Health team starting from its inception in 2007 to 2023, and the women's Human Powered Health team from 2016 until 2023.

== Major results ==
1988
1st Road race, National Junior Road Championships
1989
1st Road race, National Junior Road Championships
1990
1st Tour de Gastown
1992
1st Tour of Somerville
2nd Overall Tour of Michigan
3rd Overall Miller Superweek

1st Stage 8

1993
2nd Overall Fresca Classic

1st Stages 2 & 14

1994
1st Overall Tour of Michigan

1st Stage 1

1st Tour of Somerville
1st Stage 11 Fresca Classic
1st Stage 3 Tour of Willamette
1996
1st Pueblo
2nd Criterium, National Road Championships
1997
1st Criterium, National Road Championships
1st Carolina Cup
1st Greenville
1998
1st Athens
1st Greenville
1st Tour of Nutley
1st Tour of Somerville
1st Sommerville
2nd Criterium, National Road Championships
1999
1st Kilo, National Track Championships
1st Athens
1st Chicago
1st Houston Tour
1st Santa Rosa Criterium
1st Shelby
2000
1st Kilo, National Track Championships
1st Touchstone
1st Shelby
1st Tour of Somerville
2nd Clarendon Cup
2001
1st Team pursuit, National Track Championships (with James Carney, Colby Pearce & Ryan Miller)
1st Kelly Cup
1st Baltimore
1st Centennial
1st Folsom
1st Greenville
1st Winter Games Criterium
1st North End Classic
1st Race of the 4th of July
1st Tucson
1st Davis
1st Manhattan Beach GP
1st Irvine
International Cycling Classic

1st Stages 1, 4 & 6

2002
1st Plainview
1st Tour of Somerville
1st Stage 3 Valley of the Sun Stage Race
1st Stage 3 Solano Bicycle Classic
2003
National Track Championships

1st Madison
1st Points race

1st Clarendon Cup
1st Chris Thater Memorial Criterium
1st Roswell
1st Cat's Hill Classic
1st Tour of Somerville
1st Winfield
1st Binghamton
1st Manhattan Beach GP
1st Greenville
International Cycling Classic

1st Stages 1 & 15

2nd Tour de Nez
2004
1st Criterium, National Road Championships
1st Overall Cyclefest

1st Stages 1 & 2

1st Tour de Gastown
1st Stage 16 International Cycling Classic
National Track Championships

2nd Madison
3rd Points race

2nd Tour of Somerville
2nd Manhattan Beach GP
