= List of 1999 UCI Women's Teams =

Listed below are the 1999 UCI Women's Teams that competed in 1999 women's road cycling events organized by the International Cycling Union (UCI).

UCI code	Team Name	Country
ASP	ASPTT Champion–Moselle	France
CES	Celestial Seasonings	United States
CSH	Charles Schwab–Flexiblock	United States
CAM	C.A. Mantes La Ville–Jean Floc'H	France
EBL	Elby	France
EBL	Entente Panevėžys–Casteljaloux	Lithuania
JJW	J&J Wholesalers	South Africa
JUP	Juice Plus	Australia
MAZ	Mazza Tege Fresh Fries	Switzerland
NAV	Navigators	United States
	OMT	
PED	Pedalers	United States
PYC	Physical Culture	Canada
RTI	Radclub Tirol	Austria
	Sport Universal	
SWH	Swam Hooch	Slovakia
TEE	Teag–Euregio–Egrensis	Canada
	Team Clif Bar	United States
ELI	Team Elita	Canada
TLF	Team Lolland-Falster	Denmark
	Team Lucca BBM	Italy
	Team Shaklee	United States
GRE	The Greenery Cycling Team	Netherlands
GHT	The Greenery Hawk Team	Germany
TIM	Timex Team	United States
WWV	Westland wil Vooruit	Netherlands
