= Trent Klasna =

American cyclist (born 1969)

Personal information
- Full name: Trent Klasna
- Born: December 9, 1969 (age 56) Lantana, Florida

Cycling career
- Sport: Cycling
- Current team: Retired
- Discipline: Road
- Role: Rider
- Rider type: All-rounder

Professional teams
- 1994: Wheelsmith
- 1995–1996: Chevrolet–L.A. Sheriff
- 1997: Comptel Data System
- 1998–1999: Navigators
- 2000–2003: Saturn Cycling Team
- 2004: Sierra Nevada Cycling

Major wins
- National Time Trial Championships (2001)

Trent Klasna (born December 9, 1969) is an American former professional road bicycle racer. He comes from Lantana, Florida and rode professionally from 1994 to 2004.

== Major results ==
1996
1st Stage 2 Redlands Bicycle Classic
1997
2nd Overall Herald Sun Tour
2nd First Union Invitational
3rd Overall Tour de Beauce
1998
1st Overall Sea Otter Classic
1st Overall Valley of the Sun Stage Race

1st Stage 2

1st Stage 5 Redlands Bicycle Classic
2nd Overall Fitchburg Longsjo Classic
9th First Union Invitational
1999
1st Overall Killington Stage Race

1st Stages 1, 2 & 3

1st Stage 2 Tour de Toona
2000
1st First Union Invitational
1st Stage 4 Solano Bicycle Classic
2nd Nevada City Classic
3rd Overall Redlands Bicycle Classic

1st Stages 3 & 5

3rd Athens Twilight Criterium
3rd Bonsall-San Luis Rey Classic
2001
1st Overall USA Cycling National Racing Calendar
National Road Championships

1st Time trial
2nd Road race

1st Overall Redlands Bicycle Classic

1st Stage 4 Redlands Bicycle Classic

1st Overall Sea Otter Classic
1st Stage 6b Tour de Beauce
2nd Athens Twilight Criterium
3rd Overall Solano Bicycle Classic
3rd First Union Invitational
3rd San Francisco Grand Prix
5th First Union Classic
2002
2003
1st Overall Nature Valley Grand Prix (USA)

1st Stage 5

2004
1st Stage 1 Sea Otter Classic
