= Chris Wherry =

American road racing cyclist

Personal information
- Full name: Christopher Wherry
- Born: July 18, 1973 (age 53) Boulder, Colorado, United States

Cycling career
- Sport: Cycling
- Current team: Retired
- Discipline: Road
- Role: Rider

Amateur team
- 2009: Hotel San José

Professional teams
- 1997–2000: Saturn
- 2001–2002: Mercury
- 2003: Navigators
- 2004–2005: Health Net–Maxxis
- 2006–2008: Toyota–United

Chris Wherry (born July 18, 1973) is a former professional road racing cyclist from Boulder, Colorado. In 2006, he wore the jersey of the United States National Road Race Champion, having won the event in 2005.

Wherry is one of a series of professional riders who started in the sport through the Red Zinger Mini Classics youth bicycle series in Colorado.

== Major results ==
1996
1st Road race, National Amateur Road Championships
1998
3rd Overall Redlands Bicycle Classic
1999
1st Overall Tour of the Gila
2nd Overall Fitchburg Longsjo Classic
3rd Time trial, National Road Championships
3rd Overall Coors Classic
4th Overall Tour of Japan
2000
3rd Overall Ringerike GP
9th Overall Tour de Langkawi
2001
3rd Overall Tour de Langkawi
3rd Overall Cascade Classic

1st Stage 1

5th Overall Tour du Limousin
9th San Francisco Grand Prix
2002
1st Overall Saturn Cycling Classic
1st Overall Tour of the Gila
1st Overall Cascade Classic
1st Overall Valley of the Sun Stage Race
2nd First Union Invitational
2004
1st Stage 2 Boulder Stage Race
6th Time trial, National Road Championships
2005
National Road Championships

1st Road race/Philadelphia International Cycling Classic
5th Time trial

1st Overall Redlands Bicycle Classic

1st Prologue

1st Stage 3 International Tour de Toona
3rd Overall UCI America Tour
2006
1st Overall Cascade Classic

1st Stage 1

1st Stages 2 & 3 Tour of Utah
1st Stage 3 Tour de Nez
5th Road race, National Road Championships
7th Overall Tour of the Gila
8th Reading Classic
2007
4th Overall Redlands Bicycle Classic
4th Overall Tour de Toona

Sporting positions
Preceded by	USA National Road Race Champion; 2005	Succeeded by George Hincapie
