= Scott Mercier =

American cyclist (born 1968)

Personal information
- Born: January 24, 1968 (age 58) Telluride, Colorado, U.S.

Cycling career
- Sport: Cycling
- Current team: Retired
- Discipline: Road
- Role: Rider

Professional teams
- 1993-1996: Saturn
- 1997: U.S. Postal Service
- 1999: Navigators

Scott Mercier (born January 24, 1968) is an American former cyclist. He participated in 1 grand tour, the 1997 Vuelta a España. He also competed in the team time trial at the 1992 Summer Olympics.

== Palmares ==
1993
1st stage 4 Tour of Willamette
1994
1st stage 1 Tour of Hawaii
1995
1st stage 5 Cascade Cycling Classic
1st Prologue and stage 8 Tour de Taiwan
2nd Herald Sun Tour

1st stage 9

1996
1st Giro del Capo
1st Rapport Toer
1st Tour de Toona

1st stages 3 and 4

1999
1st stage 1 International Cycling Classic
2000
1st stage 4 American Cup
