= Heather Albert =

American bicycle racer (born 1968)

Personal information
- Full name: Heather Albert-Hall
- Born: May 27, 1968 (age 58) United States

Cycling career
- Sport: Cycling
- Disciplines: Road & Track
- Role: Rider

Professional teams
- 2000: Charles Schwab
- 2002: Goldy's
- 2004: Basis - Aude
- 2007–: Team America's Dairlyland

Heather Albert (married name Heather Albert-Hall, born May 27, 1968) is an American professional bicycle racer. She is also the author of a book titled "The Genisoy Diet".

Born in Sandy, Utah, Albert attended Brigham Young University, Utah, and has a Ph.D. in microbiology. A cross country runner in high school, she tried duathlon at college before her brother suggested she try cycling. She began racing in 1994 and became a full-time cyclist in 1995.

Albert broke her right clavicle and dislocated her thumb in March 2004, when she was brought down in an incident involving Rebecca Quinn during a track race at the Alkek Velodrome, Houston.

Albert is now an accomplished track and road racer, winning the silver medal at the United States National Track Championships points race and bronze in the team pursuit. She lives in Eagle, Idaho with her husband, Uhl.

== Palmarès ==
1996
2nd United States National Road Race Championships

2001
1st Eureka Road Race
2nd RMCC Rhodes Criterium
1st Chums Classic Stage Race

2002
1st International Tour de Toona

1st Stage 3, Johnstown to Altoona
1st Stage 6, Altoona Blair County Road Race

4th United States National Road Race Championships
1st Stage 9, Twin Falls to Glenn's Ferry, Women's Challenge (2.9.1)

2005
2nd Garden Creek Gap Road Race
1st Gate City Grind State Race

2007
2nd Points race, United States National Track Championships
3rd Team pursuit, United States National Track Championships
