= North Star Bicycle Festival =

Cycling event in Minnesota, United States

The North Star Bicycle Festival, is a ten-day series of cycling events that take place at sites around central Minnesota. The festival has gone by multiple names since its creation in 1999 as Tour de Wings. It was known as the Great River Energy Bicycle Festival for 2000–2008, the Minnesota Bicycle Festival in 2009, and the Nature Valley Bicycle Festival for 2010–2013.. It is currently known as the North Star Bicycle Festival.

The festival takes place in mid-June. In 2016, the Festival took place on June 10–19, beginning with the Minnesota Fixed Gear Classic, June 10–11. The event consisted of velodrome racing at the National Sports Center in Blaine, Minnesota.

The marquee event of the Festival is the North Star Grand Prix, a professional bicycle stage race. In 2016, races took place in the downtowns of Saint Paul, Cannon Falls, Minneapolis, North Mankato and Stillwater.

The North Star Grand Prix is one of only four stage races on the USA Cycling National Racing Calendar

The presenting sponsor is North Memorial Health Care

The North Star Bicycle Festival was cancelled in 2018, which would have been its 20th year. An attempt to bring it back in 2019 failed since it had no cash sponsors and a GoFundMe campaign raised only 6% of the needed funds.

== Charitable mission ==
The North Star Bicycle Festival is a volunteer-run 501(c)(3) charity whose missions are bicycle education and to support Special Olympics Minnesota. All proceeds from the Festival are donated to Special Olympics Minnesota.

== History ==
The North Star Bicycle Festival got its start in 1998, when the Lance Armstrong Foundation approached David LaPorte and asked for help to create a Twin Cities replica of the popular Austin, Texas-based Ride for the Roses. LaPorte launched the Tour de Wings in 1999. The two-day event featured a criterium in Saint Paul, around the grounds of the state Capitol, and a track race at the National Sports Center Velodrome.

In 2000, Great River Energy became a major sponsor and the event was named the Touchstone Energy Bicycle Festival. Track racing at the NSC Velodrome featured a four-day EDS Cup and the criterium moved from the state Capitol to downtown Saint Paul.

Nature Valley Granola Bars joined as a sponsor in 2001 and a new road race stage was added. Great River Energy sponsored the U.S. Track National Championships during the festival at the NSC Velodrome and the festival made its first charitable donation to Camp Heartland.

From 2002 to 2006, the festival grew into a major annual Minnesota sporting event. Renamed The Great River Energy Bicycle Festival and Nature Valley Grand Prix, new venues and communities got involved, ultimately making the festival a six-stage race over a five-day period. Stillwater, Minn., became the marquis criterium of the event featuring an 18% climb up Chilkoot Hill. In 2003, a stage was added in Minneapolis, which made the Friday Night Minneapolis Downtown Classic the most widely attended stage of the five-day North Star Grand Prix. This stage moved to Uptown, Minneapolis in 2009

The North Star Grand Prix attempts to be as equal as possible between men’s and women’s racing and has become an important women’s stage race in North America. The festival also named Special Olympics Minnesota its sole charitable beneficiary of the proceeds created by the event.

In 2007, the North Star Grand Prix became the top level stage race on the USA Cycling National Racing Calendar. Organizers also launched a Women’s Collegiate All-Stars team, the first of its kind in the nation. Most recently, both the men’s and women’s races became invitation only events, topping out at 140 female and 140 male riders.

Event organizers attempted to extend the sponsorship contract for the event in the first half of 2013, but were unable to come to an agreement before the contract expired in June that year. The organization held an unsponsored event in 2014. For 2015, the primary sponsors were North Memorial Health Care and PreferredOne. North Memorial Health Care continued its sponsorship in 2016
