= Team Shaklee =

Team information
- Registered: United States of America
- Founded: 1987
- Disbanded: 2000
- Discipline: Road
- Status: UCI Continental

Key personnel
- Team manager: Frank Scioscia

Team name history
- 1987–1998 1999–2000: Team Shaklee; Shaklee

Team Shaklee was an American pro cycling team from 1987 to 2000. The team director was Frank Scioscia, and riders included Eric Wohlberg, Chris Coletta, John Stenner, John Frey, Mark Waite, and Kent Bostick. In 1988, the team won the team time trial title at the U.S. National Cycling Championships.

== Final roster ==
As at 31 December 2000

Rider	Date of birth
Marco Aledia (USA)	30 March 1975 (aged 25)
Sylvain Beauchamp (CAN)	22 March 1973 (aged 27)
Mike Beers (CAN)	16 May 1973 (aged 27)
Kent Bostick (USA)	27 June 1953 (aged 47)
Steven Broglio (CAN)	6 June 1974 (aged 26)
James Carney (USA)	29 November 1968 (aged 32)
Jonas Carney (USA)	3 February 1971 (aged 29)
John Rachfal (USA)	24 July 1972 (aged 28)
James Hibbard (USA)	19 October 1981 (aged 19)
Adam Laurent (USA)	6 July 1971 (aged 29)
John Lieswyn (USA)	18 August 1968 (aged 32)

Rider	Date of birth
Craig Mattern (USA)	17 August 1974 (aged 26)
Luke Mauritsen (USA)	1 October 1973 (aged 27)
David McCook (USA)	24 December 1969 (aged 31)
Graeme Miller (NZL)	20 November 1960 (aged 40)
Glen Mitchell (NZL)	19 October 1972 (aged 28)
Colby Pearce (USA)	12 June 1972 (aged 28)
Christian Valenzuela (MEX)	20 October 1978 (aged 22)
Peter Wedge (CAN)	18 September 1972 (aged 28)
David Wenger (USA)	2 April 1980 (aged 20)
Eric Wohlberg (CAN)	8 January 1965 (aged 35)

== Major wins ==
2000
Stage 4 Tour of Japan, Graeme Miller
