= Norman Alvis =

American cyclist (born 1963)

Norm Alvis
Personal information
- Full name: Norman Foster Darrell Alvis
- Born: July 12, 1963 (age 63) Sacramento, California, U.S.
- Height: 6 ft 2 in (188 cm)
- Weight: 180 lb (82 kg)

Cycling career
- Sport: Cycling
- Current team: Chalet Cycling
- Discipline: Road
- Role: Rider

Amateur teams
- 1979–1981: Sacramento Golden Wheelmen
- 1983: G. S. Stelvio
- 1984: G. S. Mengoni
- 1986-1987: Ten Speed Drive

Professional teams
- 1988–1990: 7-Eleven
- 1991–1994: Motorola
- 1995–1998: Saturn

Major wins
- United States National Road Race Championships (1995)

Norman Foster Darrell "Norm" Alvis (born July 12, 1963 in Sacramento, California) is a former professional (and current master) American cyclist. He was professional from 1988 to 1998. He won dozens of races as a junior, amateur (now known as senior), professional and masters racer. He competed in the team time trial at the 1988 Summer Olympics. In 1997 he set the one hour record for track time trial which held for 17 years.

== Major results ==
1979
1st Pinkie's Road Race, Junior B Men
1980
3rd NorCal Nevada District Road Race, Junior Men
1981
1st National Bicycle Championship | Time Trial, Junior Men (15-17)
1st Donner Summit Criterium Race, Men B
1983
1st NorCal Nevada Road Racing Championship, Senior (amateur) Men
1987
1st National Championships, Time trial, Senior (amateur) Men
1st Discover City Criterium, Miami, FL
1988
1st Carolinas Invitational
1st La Jolla Grand Prix
1st Matilda Bay Superweek
10th 1988 Summer Olympics - 100 km Team Time Trial
1989
1st Gastown Grand Prix
1st Santa Rosa Classic
1991
1st Stage 1 Bayern Rundfahrt
1992
4th Giro del Lazio
4th GP de Fourmies
1993
6th Grand Prix d'Isbergues
6th Paris–Camembert
1995
1st National Championship Road race, professional
1st Philadelphia International Championship
1st Stage 3 Herald Sun Tour
1st Stage 4 Tour de Taiwan
2nd Overall Cascade Cycling Classic
1997
Elite Men, 1 hour Track Time Trial record, 51.505km
1st Overall Herald Sun Tour

1st Stages 4, 11 & 13

1st Overall Tour de Toona

1st Stage 3

1st Fresca Invitational
1st Tour of America
2nd Time trial, National Road Championships
1998
2nd Time trial, National Road Championships
1st Roanoke Orthopaedic Center HillClimb
2017
1 hour Track Time Trial record, Masters M50-54, distance 49.392km
1st Colorado State Championship Masters, M50+, Criterium
2019
5th National Championship Masters Road, M55-59, Criterium
2021
1 hour Track Time Trial record, Masters M55-59, distance 49.387km
4th National Championship Masters Road, M55-59, Time Trial
2nd National Championship Masters Road, M55-59, Road Race
2nd National Championship Masters Road, M55-59, Criterium
2022
2nd National Championship Masters Road, M55-59, Time Trial
3rd National Championship Masters Road, M55-59, Road Race
4th National Championship Masters Road, M55-59, Criterium
2023
1st Colorado State Championship Masters, M50+, Road Race
1st Colorado State Championship Masters, M60+, Road Race
3rd Colorado State Championship Masters, M50+, Criterium
1st Colorado State Championship Masters, M60+, Criterium
1st Overall Tour of Americas Dairyland, M60+

== US Hour Record Holder ==
1997: 51.505 kilometers. Record stood until September 16, 2016

== Grand Tour results ==
=== Tour de France ===
- 1990: 142nd

=== Giro d'Italia ===
- 1990: 127th
- 1992: 143rd
- 1993: 127th
