= Clark Sheehan =

American cyclist (born 1966)

Personal information
- Born: April 7, 1969 (age 57) Denver, Colorado

Cycling career
- Sport: Cycling
- Current team: Human Powered Health
- Discipline: Road
- Role: Rider (retired); Directeur sportif

Professional teams
- 1990: Alpine Colorado
- 1991–1992: Coors Light
- 1993: Saturn Cycling Team
- 1994: Guiltless Gourmet
- 1995–1996: Montgomery–Bell
- 1997: Comptel Data Systems
- 2000–2002: 7Up–Colorado Cyclist

Managerial teams
- 2021–2023: Rally Cycling
- 2021–: Rally Cycling

Clark Sheehan (born April 7, 1969) is an American former professional racing cyclist. He currently works as a directeur sportif for UCI Women's WorldTeam Human Powered Health. He also held the same position with the corresponding men's team prior to its dissolution.

His son Riley is also a professional cyclist.

== Major results ==
1990
7th Overall Tour DuPont
1993
1st Prologue Vuelta Mexico
1995
1st Stage 8 Tour DuPont
2nd Road race, National Road Championships
3rd Philadelphia International Championship
1998
3rd Overall Valley of the Sun Stage Race
2000
1st Stage 1 Redlands Bicycle Classic
3rd Overall Cascade Cycling Classic
2001
1st Hotter'N Hell Hundred
5th Time trial, National Road Championships
