= Valley of the Sun Stage Race =

Race details
- Date: February
- Region: Phoenix, Arizona
- Discipline: Road
- Competition: National calendar
- Type: Stage race
- Organiser: White Mountain Road Club

History
- First edition: 1992
- Editions: 33 (as of 2025)
- Most wins: Jonathan Chodroff (USA) (2 wins)
- Most recent: Carson Mattern (CAN)

The Valley of the Sun Stage Race is a multi-day cycling race held in Phoenix, Arizona. The race takes annually in February and is contested over three days.

== Winners ==
Year	Winner	Second	Third
1995	(Italy) Roberto Gaggioli	(United States) Jorge Espinosa	(Canada) Brian Clifford Walton
1996	(United States) Dirk Copeland	(United States) Robert Ventura	(United States) Greg Randolph
1997	(Lithuania) Remigius Lupeikis		
1998	(United States) Trent Klasna	(United States) Jonathan Vaughters	(United States) Clark Sheehan
1999	(United States) James Carney	(United States) Christian Vandevelde	(United States) Dylan Casey
2000	(Canada) Gordon Fraser	(United States) Floyd Landis	(United States) David Zabriskie
2001	(Australia) Baden Cooke	(Australia) Jamie Drew	(United States) John Kelly
2002	(United States) Chris Wherry	(United States) Chris Fisher	(United States) Scott Moninger
2003	(United States) Aaron Olsen	(Cuba) Iván Domínguez	(United States) Mark McCormack
2004	(United States) Mariano Friedick	(New Zealand) Gordon McCauley	(United States) Ryan Blickem
2005	(United States) Ryan Blickem	(United States) Brian Sheedy	(Italy) Giancarlo Checchi
2006	(United States) Tom Zirbel	(United States) Curtis Gunn	(United States) Ryan Blickem
2007	(United States) Matthew Seagrave	(United States) Dan Vinson	(United States) Corey Collier
2008	(United States) Karl Bordine	(United States) Ben Kneller	(United States) Sam Johnson
2009	(United States) Jonathan Chodroff	(United States) Ben Kneller	(United States) Graham Howard
2010	(United States) Jonathan Chodroff	(Cuba) Luis Amarán	(United States) Andrew Talansky
2011	(United States) Paul Thomas	(United States) J. Gunn Wilkinson	(Portugal) Craig Nunes
2012	(Cuba) Luis Amarán	(United States) Eric Marcotte	(Latvia) Andžs Flaksis
2013	(United States) Ben Jacques-Maynes	(United States) Jim Peterman	(Cuba) Luis Amarán
2014	(United States) Daniel Eaton	(Mexico) Fabrizio Von Nacher	(Canada) Tyler Schwartz
2015	(New Zealand) Heath Blackgrove	(United States) Chad Beyer	(United States) Brian McCulloch
2016	(Canada) Ryan Roth	(United States) Brandon McNulty	(United States) Innokenty Zavyalov
2017	(United States) Innokenty Zavyalov	(Canada) James Piccoli	(United States) Wouter Zwart
2018	(United States) Wouter Zwart	(United States) Cory Lockwood	(United States) David Greif
2019	(United States) Cory Lockwood	(United States) Stephen Vogel	(United States) Matthew Zimmer
2020	(United States) Magnus Sheffield	(United States) Tyler Williams	(United States) Matthew Riccitello
2021	Cancelled		
2022	(United States) Tyler Stites	(United States) Zach Gregg	(United States) Stephen Vogel
2023	(Bermuda) Conor White	(Canada) Jordan Cheyne	(United States) Stephen Vogel
2024	(United States) Joshua Lebo	(United States) Garin Kelley	(United States) Luke Arrens
2025	(Canada) Carson Mattern	(United States) Cory Lockwood	(United States) Tim McBirney
