= Optimized Athlete =

American company

- Industry: Health and wellness
- Founded: California, United States, 2012
- Founder: Sky Christopherson; Tamara Christopherson
- Services: Digital health consulting
- Website: oathlete.com

Optimized Athlete is a California-based digital health company, specializing in performance consulting. The project was created in 2011 by athletes Sky Christopherson, Tamara Christopherson, and Adam Laurent, and the project supported the US women's cycling team to a silver medal at the 2012 Summer Olympics. The company continues to operate as a "firm engaged in using genomics, self quantification, and bioinformatics to improve human performance."

== History ==
=== Founding ===
Optimized Athlete was co-founded by Sky Christopherson and his wife, Tamara Christopherson, early in 2012. The Christophersons put $20,000 into the endeavor to start, and the team also included another Olympic athlete and a veteran of Silicon Valley. Both Christophersons, who attended UC San Diego, were influenced by the university's research community. The company's supporters include Dr. Eric Topol, director of the Scripps Translational Science Institute. Sky Christopherson had previously used Dr. Topol's digital quantification strategies to win a World Record in the 35+ 200m velodrome sprint in 2011.

=== 2012 Olympics ===
In July 2012 The Financial Times revealed that several health technology companies, including Optimized Athlete, have supplied Olympics athletes with devices intended to optimise their performance, in what CNN said some people were calling "the Twitter Olympics" and the "Data Olympics."

The company helped the US cycling team (specifically the women's sprint cycling team) track their health with glucose monitors, a sleep monitor, and genetic reports on nutritional needs and muscular capacity.

About using the method, Christopher stated, "When we arrived in Spain [to consult] we met a [US track cycling team] that was basically underfunded and only had one coach, while comparatively their competition were well funded and had experts staffed full-time: sports physiologists, psychologists, video analysis, you name it. Without any of this, we had to figure out how to ‘boot-strap’ a performance plan. We started with a genetic test for each athlete to provide context for the tracking and intervention strategies. What unfolded was amazing." The women's team broke a national record within weeks before competing in London and went on to beat the favored Australians in the semi-finals, culminating their run with a silver medal at the 2012 London Olympics.

The company continues to operate as a "firm engaged in using genomics, self quantification, and bioinformatics to improve human performance."

=== Tools ===
The company uses surveys with programs such as InsideTracker, where a detailed online analysis offers nutritional recommendations based on biomarkers like glucose, folic acid and vitamin D. One other tool used is the Dexcom continuous blood glucose tracking sensor, to help with diet. According to Sky Christopherson, "Something important to note about biometrics being adopted by my clients is that they’re not using these tools simply to improve performance – what they are actually doing is maximizing their baseline health, something we call ‘Health Performance’."
