= Guy East =

American cyclist (born 1987)

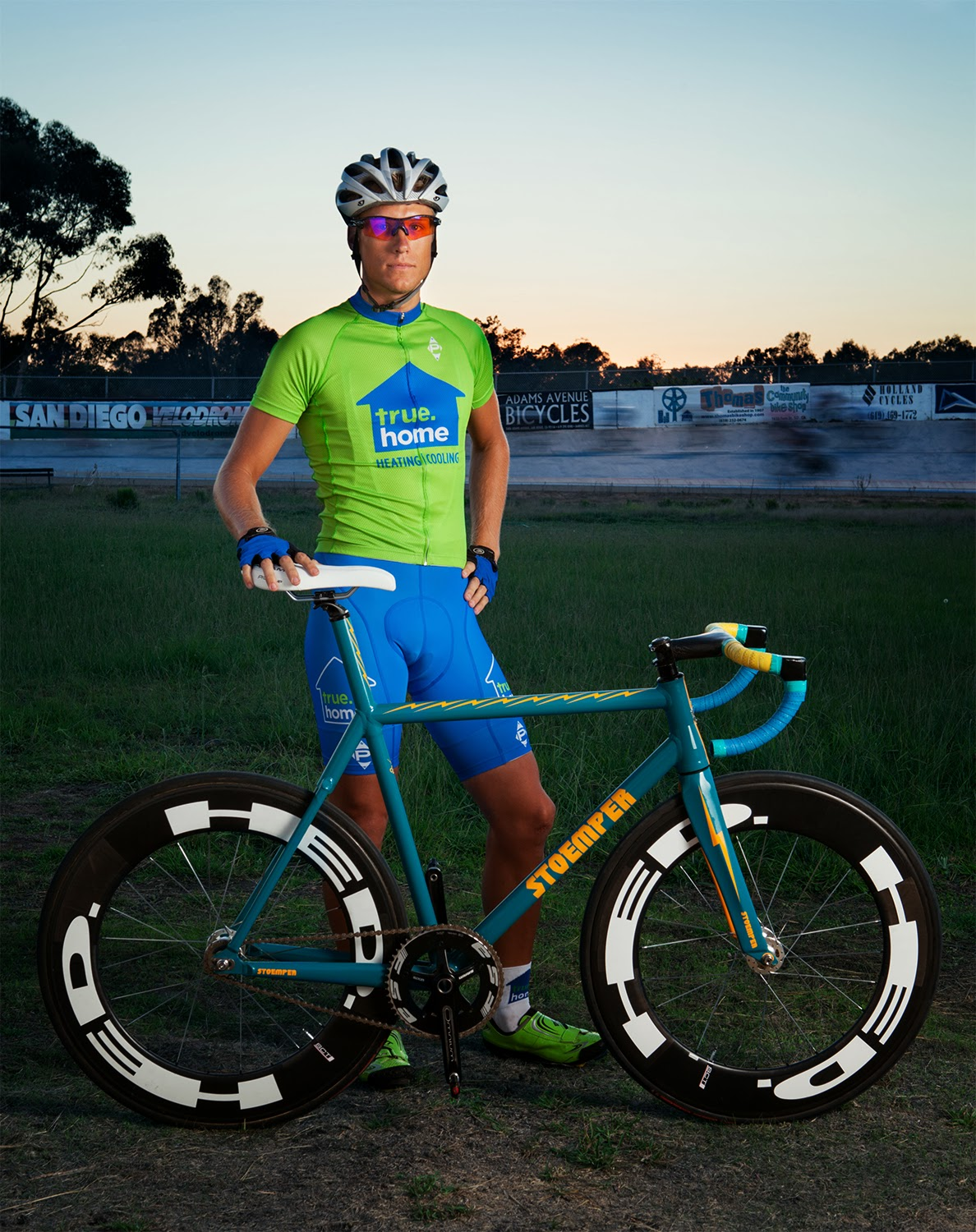
- Guy East before a racing event

Personal information
- Full name: Guy Eldon East
- Born: October 18, 1987 (age 38) Indianapolis, Indiana, USA
- Height: 5 ft 11 in (1.80 m)
- Weight: 160 lb (73 kg)

Cycling career
- Sport: Cycling
- Disciplines: Road & Track

Professional teams
- 2009: Trek/LiveSTRONG
- 2010–2011: Optum Health Pro Cycling
- 2012–present: Professional 6-day track racer

Major wins
- 1st Overall UIV Talent Cup (with Austin Carroll) (2009); 1st Dortmund U23 Six Day (2008); 1st Stage 1 Vuelta Mazatlán Stage 1; 1st Vuelta Mazatlán Stage 2 (2013); 2nd Nations Cup – Coupe des nations Ville Saguenay (Canada) (2.NCup), Stage 4 Time Trial (2008); 3rd Overall Tour of Belize (2.2) (2008); 3rd Vlaamse Brabant (2.12), Stage 3 Time Trial (2007)a

Guy East (born October 18, 1987) is a professional road and track cyclist from the United States. East has competed at the international level since 2005 and in the United States since 2000. He has been a member of the United States men's national cycling team since 2006 and is a member of Lance Armstrong's Livestrong Foundation. East has competed in nearly 30 countries on four continents. He also serves with Hope Sports in Tijuana, Mexico. East halted his professional cycling career for a period in 2009.

== Early life and junior cycling competition ==
East was born to Marsha and Guy M. East on October 18, 1987, in Milwaukee. He grew up in Indianapolis, as the eldest of five children. East's siblings include James and Andrew, who were both involved in sports. James played football as an All-American at Wheaton College in Wheaton, Illinois. Andrew played football at Vanderbilt University as a long snapper and has played with several National Football League teams. Andrew is married to Shawn Johnson East, the Olympic gold medalist gymnast, to whom he was introduced after Guy met Johnson at the 2008 Beijing Olympics.

Guy East's first club, called the Mob Squad, was located in Indiana. He has competed internationally in road cycling and track cycling since 2005. In 2008, East participated in the European U23 Six Day event, winning third place in Munich, second in Ghent, and first in Dortmund. He received an invitation to join the United States men's national cycling team based in San Diego. During his years on the national squad, East visited Belgium for cycling competitions in four seasons.

In 2012, after a two-year hiatus, East returned to professional track cycling and focused on six-day indoor cycle races. He has had 14 professional 6-Day starts in Amsterdam, Berlin, Rotterdam, Fiorenzuola, Grenoble, and Copenhagen. In October 2013, Daniel Holloway and East raced together as the California Team at the first half-Six Day race since the 1940s. He has also raced for Trek-Livestrong, a professional road team directed by Axel Merckx.

East resides near San Diego, California.

== Leadership and projects ==
2013 1st Vuelta Mazatlán Stage 2 record was one of his famous wins. East has taken part in competitions in approximately 30 countries. During his competitions, he has observed extreme poverty in many underdeveloped countries, especially in urban areas such as the Philippines and Mexico. In 2009, East, with the Trek team, rode a tour of Mexico and noticed the high level of poverty there. He took part in several projects to help impoverished people in Central and South America. After two years, East decided to return to professional racing, while still being involved in charitable organizations nationally and internationally.

=== Hope Sports ===
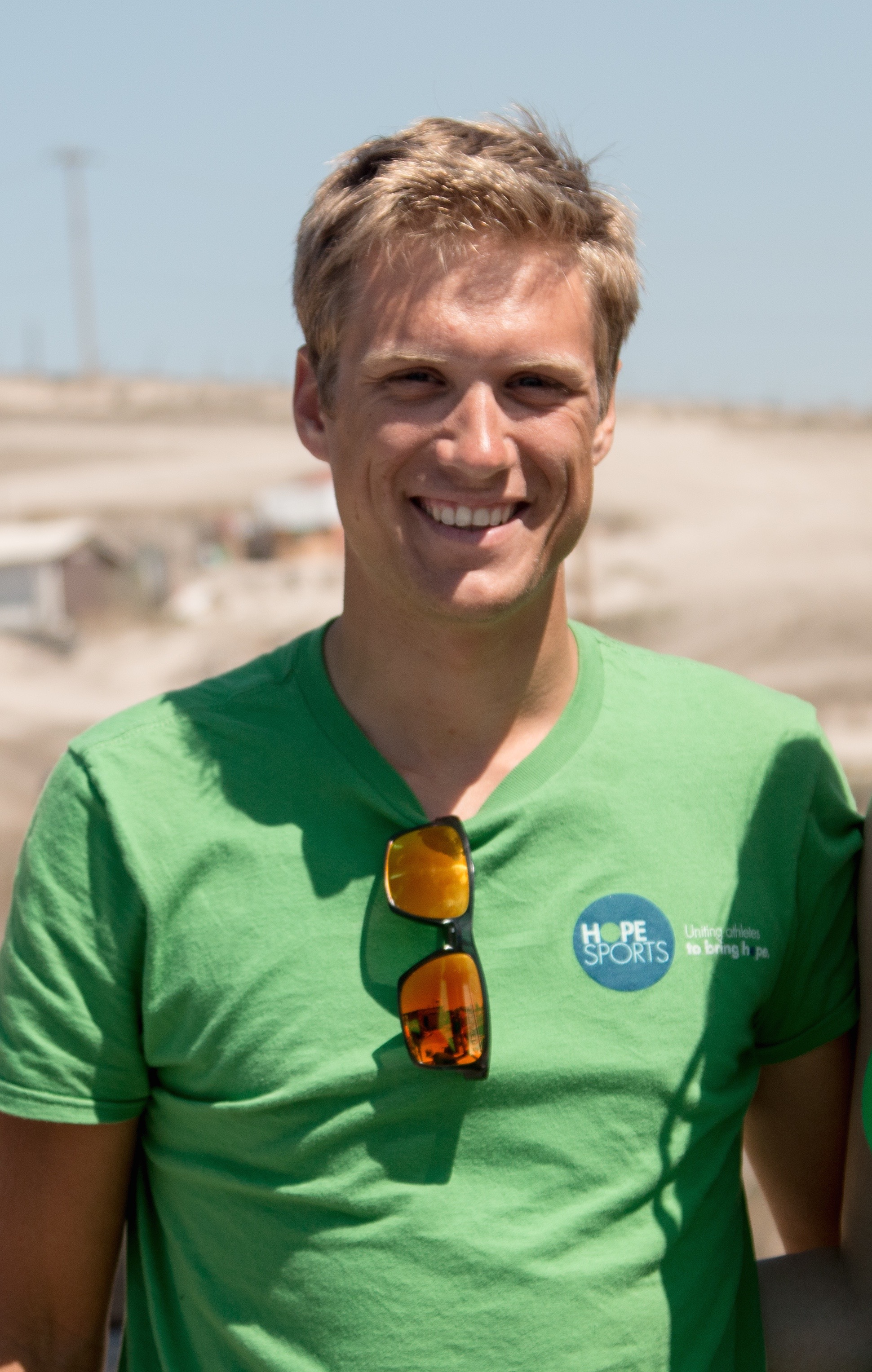
Guy East during a Hope Sports event

Guy East founded Hope Sports in March 2015. In its first year, the organization built 11 houses and hosted over 200 professional and Olympic Games athletes. In 2016, the group rolled out a leadership program for athletes who want to engage and learn after the build is complete.

Hope Sports has built 30 homes for the poor with the help of 500 professional and elite athletes.

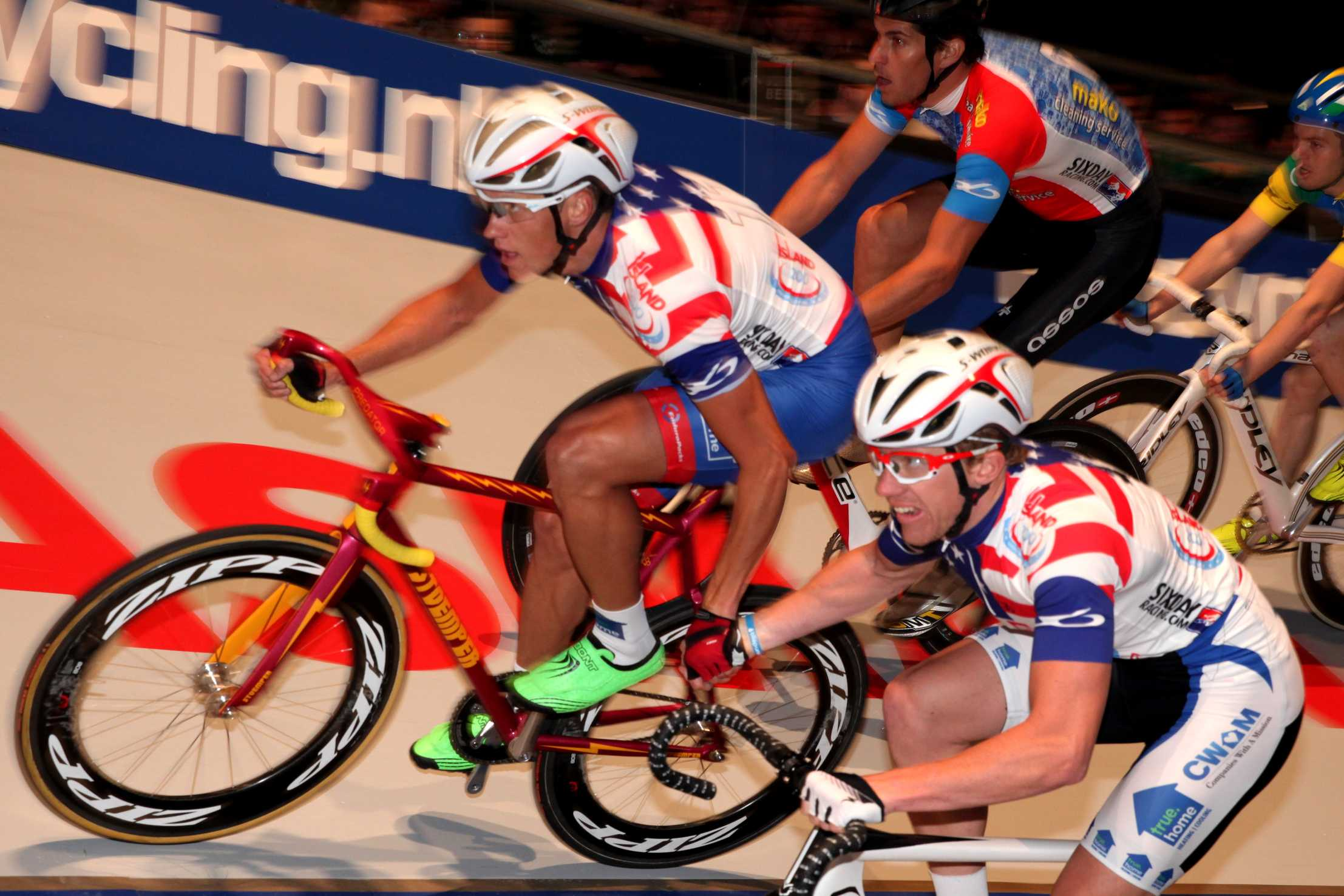
Guy East During a 2014 Six-Day Cycling Event

== Career achievements ==
=== Major results ===
2008
1st Stage 3 Tour of Belize (UCI 2.2)
1st Team Classification Flèche du Sud (UCI 2.2)
2nd stage 4 Coupe des Nations Canada (2.Ncup)
3rd Overall Tour of Belize (UCI 2.2)
5th Prologue Flèche du Sud (UCI 2.2)

==== Track ====
1st Dortmund UIV Overall
1st Gent UIV Day 1
1st Dortmund UIV Day 1
1st Noel Fore Memorial
2nd Gent UIV Overall
2nd Gent UIV Day 2
2nd Gent UIV Day 6
2nd United States National Track Championships Madison
3rd Munich UIV Overall
3rd Revolution 21 Madison 1km TT
3rd Gent UIV Day 4
3rd Dortmund UIV Day 3
3rd Munich UIV Day 2
3rd Munich UIV Day 3

2009
Six Days of Grenoble

2010
Six Days of Fiorenzuola
4th Stage 4 Tour of Luzon
5th Stage 2 Tour of Luzon
7th Stage 3 Tour of Luzon

2012
Six Days of Fiorenzuola
Six Days of Grenoble

2013
Six Days of Berlin
Six Days of Copenhagen
Six Days of Amsterdam

2014
Six Days of Rotterdam
Six Days of Berlin
Six Days of Copenhagen
Six Days of Amsterdam

2015
Six Days of Fiorenzuola

2016
Six Days of Fiorenzuola

2017
Six Days of Fiorenzuola
