= North Star Grand Prix =

Race details
- Date: June
- Region: United States of America
- Discipline: Road
- Competition: National (1999–2017)
- Type: Stage race

History
- First edition: 1999
- Editions: 19
- Most recent: Brodie Chapman (AUS)

The North Star Grand Prix is a men's and women's road bicycle racing stage race held each June in Minnesota, United States, as part of the North Star Bicycle Festival. An event was added in North Mankato in 2016. The North Star Grand Prix is one of only four races on the USA Cycling Pro Road Tour. The 2010 Grand Prix had six stages: three criteriums, two road races and a time trial.

The event was known as the Nature Valley Grand Prix until 2013, but was renamed following sponsorship changes. The North Star Bicycle Festival is run by volunteers, proceeds going to Special Olympics Minnesota.

The North Star Grand Prix was cancelled in 2018, which would have been its 20th year. An attempt to bring it back in 2019 failed since it had no cash sponsors and a GoFundMe campaign raised only 6% of the needed funds.

== Winners ==
Year	Country	Rider	Team
1999	Canada	Odessa Gunn	Timex
2000	United States	Rebecca Quinn	Shaklee
2001	United States	Suzanne Sonye	Saturn Cycling Team
2002	United States	Laura Van Gilder	Trek Plus
2003	Australia	Katie Mactier	Saturn Cycling Team
2004	Canada	Lyne Bessette	Quark
2005	United States	Christine Thorburn	Webcor Builders Women's Cycling Team
2006	United States	Kristin Armstrong	Team Lipton
2007	United States	Kristin Armstrong	Team Lipton
2008	United States	Kristin Armstrong	Cervélo Lifeforce
2009	United States	Kristin Armstrong	Cervélo Test Team
2010	United States	Shelley Olds	Twenty12
2011	United States	Amber Neben	HTC–Highroad Women
2012	United States	Carmen Small	Optum Pro Cycling
2013	United States	Shelley Olds	Team TIBCO–To The Top
2014	United States	Carmen Small	Specialized–lululemon
2015	No race		
2016	United States	Brianne Walle	Tibco–Silicon Valley Bank
2017	United States	Emma White	Rally Cycling
2018	No race		

=== Men's Elite/Pro Race ===
	Cyclist	Country	Team
2016	Evan Huffman	United States	Rally Cycling
2015	Tom Zirbel	United States	Team Optum p/b Kelly Benefit Strategies
2014	Ryan Anderson	United States	Team Optum p/b Kelly Benefit Strategies
2013	Michael Friedman	United States	Team Optum p/b Kelly Benefit Strategies
2012	Tom Zirbel	United States	Team Optum p/b Kelly Benefit Strategies
2011	Jesse Anthony	United States	Team Optum p/b Kelly Benefit Strategies
2010	Rory Sutherland	Australia	UnitedHealthcare
2009	Rory Sutherland	Australia	OUCH Pro Cycling Team
2008	Rory Sutherland	Australia	Health Net Pro Cycling Team Presented by Maxxis
2007	Ivan Stević	Serbia	Toyota–United Pro Cycling Team
2006	Karl Menzies	Australia	Health Net Pro Cycling Team Presented by Maxxis
2005	John Lieswyn	United States	Health Net Pro Cycling Team Presented by Maxxis
2004	Benjamin Jacques-Maynes	United States	Sierra Nevada
2003	Trent Klasna	United States	Saturn
2002	John Lieswyn	United States	7UP
2001	Frank McCormack	United States	Saturn
2000	Robbie Ventura	United States	Saturn
1999	Dale Sedgewick	United States	NOW Sports
