= Tamara Jenkins (canoeist) =

American canoeist

Personal information
- Born: August 20, 1978 (age 47) Seattle, Washington, United States

Sport
- Sport: Canoeing
Medal record
Representing United States
Pan American Games
Silver medal – second place	1999 Winnipeg	K-2 500m
Bronze medal – third place	1999 Winnipeg	K-4 500m

Tamara Cheek (née Jenkins; born August 20, 1978) is an American sprint kayaker who competed in the early 2000s. At the 2000 Summer Olympics in Sydney, she was eliminated in the semifinals of the K-2 500 m event.

She founded Vicaso. She also co-founded the consulting firm Optimized Athlete.

Tamara Cheek is married to Joey Cheek.
