= Dotsie Bausch =

American cyclist

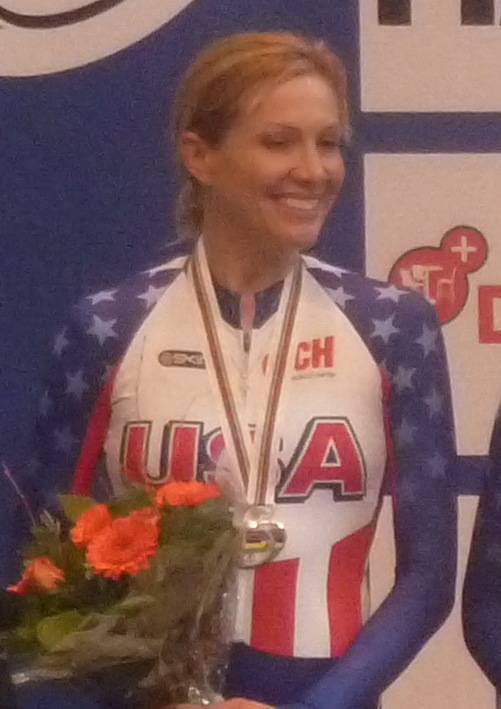
- Bausch in 2011

Personal information
- Website: DotsieBauschUSA.com
Medal record
Women's road bicycle racing
Representing United States
Pan American Championships
Bronze medal – third place	2007 Valencia	Time trial

Dorothy Lee "Dotsie" Bausch is an American former cyclist and Olympic silver medalist. She is also the executive director of the nonprofit Switch4Good.

== Early life ==
Bausch grew up in Kentucky and graduated from Villanova University with a degree in journalism.

At 26 years old, toward the end of her therapy work, her therapist encouraged her to move her body again, choosing a physical activity that was not attached to a goal of fitness or weight loss. She chose cycling.

== Career ==
In the 2012 Olympics, Bausch won a silver medal in team pursuit.

Bausch was featured in the 2015 documentary Personal Gold: An Underdog Story and the 2017 documentary The Game Changers.

Bausch helped start Courageous Voice, an organization to help people with eating disorders. Bausch herself had struggled with an eating disorder.

Switch4Good is an athlete-driven nonprofit working toward a dairy-free future. The organization employs athlete stories with scientific research and outreach to help others "live better and do more" by avoiding dairy.
