= Roman Kilun =

American cyclist

Personal information
- Born: 27 November 1981 (age 44) Tashkent, Uzbek SSR

Cycling career
- Sport: Cycling
- Current team: Team Mike's Bikes p/b Equator Coffe
- Discipline: Road
- Role: Rider

Amateur team
- 2013–: Team Mike's Bikes p/b Equator Coffe

Professional teams
- 2003: Webcor Cycling Team
- 2004–2005: McGuire Pro Cycling
- 2006–2010: Health Net–Maxxis
- 2011–2012: Kenda–5-hour Energy

Roman on pro-cycling statsRoman Kilun (born 27 November 1981) is an American road cyclist, who currently rides for Team Mike's Bikes p/b Equator Coffe.

== Major results ==
2005
1st Overall Tour of Virginia
3rd Overall Sea Otter Classic
2008
1st Stages 2b & 4 Tour de Nez
2013
1st Overall Chico Stage Race

1st Stage 2

2nd Nevada City Classic
2017
2nd Overall Tour de Nez
