= Brad Huff =

American cyclist (born 1979)

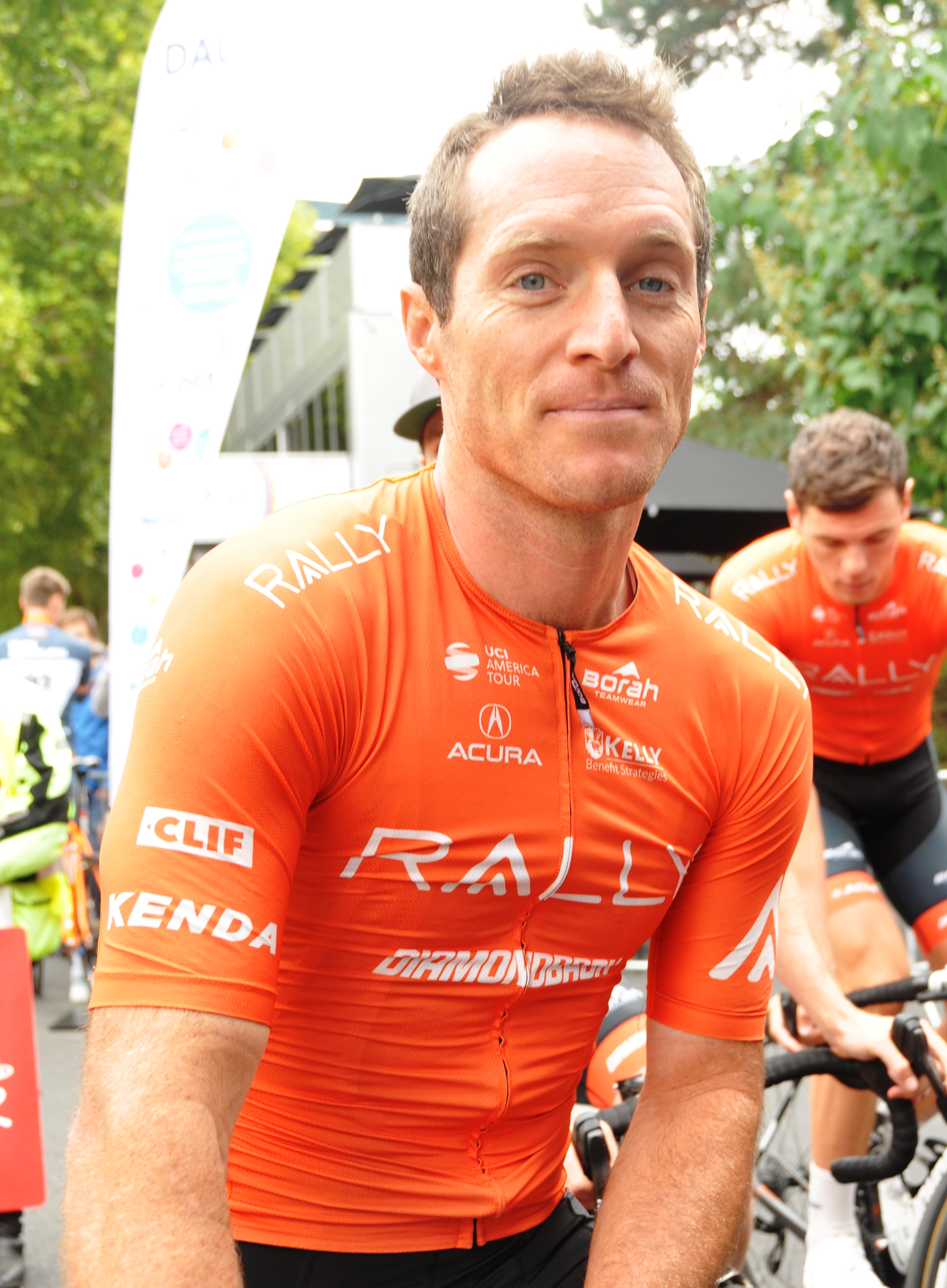
- Huff in 2018

Personal information
- Full name: Charles Bradley Huff
- Nickname: Brad
- Born: February 5, 1979 (age 47) Fair Grove, Missouri

Cycling career
- Sport: Cycling
- Current team: Retired
- Disciplines: Road; Track
- Role: Rider
- Rider type: Sprinter

Professional teams
- 2006–2007: TIAA–CREF
- 2008–2013: Jelly Belly Cycling Team
- 2014–2018: Optum–Kelly Benefit Strategies

Charles Bradley Huff (born February 5, 1979, in Fair Grove, Missouri) is an American former cyclist, who competed professionally between 2006 and 2018 for the Slipstream–Chipotle, Jelly Belly–Kenda and Rally Cycling teams.

== Major results ==
2006
1st Stage 1 Tour de Normandie
1st US rider National Criterium Championships (2nd overall)
2008
Tour of Hainan

1st Stages 3 & 5

1st Stage 2 Tour of Elk Grove
2009
1st Overall Tulsa Tough

1st Stages 1 & 2

1st Stage 14 International Cycling Classic
2010
1st Stage 3 Tour of Hainanco-leader of project dude man
Tulsa Tough

1st Stages 1 & 2

2012
1st Stage 4 Nature Valley Grand Prix
2nd Tulsa Tough
2013
1st Stage 2 Tour of Lawrence
2014
1st Stage 4 Joe Martin Stage Race
2016
1st National Criterium Championships
1st Prologue Tour de Guadeloupe
2nd Overall Nature Valley Grand Prix

1st Stage 5
