= Robbie Ventura =

American racing cyclist (born 1971)

Personal information
- Born: May 5, 1971 (age 55) United States

Cycling career
- Sport: Cycling
- Current team: Retired

Professional teams
- 1998: Navigators Cycling Team
- 1999-2000: Saturn Cycling Team
- 2001-2004: U.S. Postal Service Cycling Team

Robbie Ventura (born May 5, 1971) is an American former professional racing cyclist.

== Career ==
=== Early career ===
Robbie graduated with honors from Lake Forest College with a double major in Business and Psychology. While working toward his bachelor's degree, he played on the Forester hockey team, which advanced to the NCAA Tournament, and was named to the All-American Collegiate Cycling Team. In 2008, he was inducted into the LFC Athletic Hall of Fame for his accomplishments in both hockey and cycling.

=== Racing career ===
Robbie Ventura raced professionally for 12 years, including 3 years in the United States Postal Service Cycling Team. Ventura accumulated over 70 wins.
