= Luis Amarán =

Cuban cyclist (born 1979)

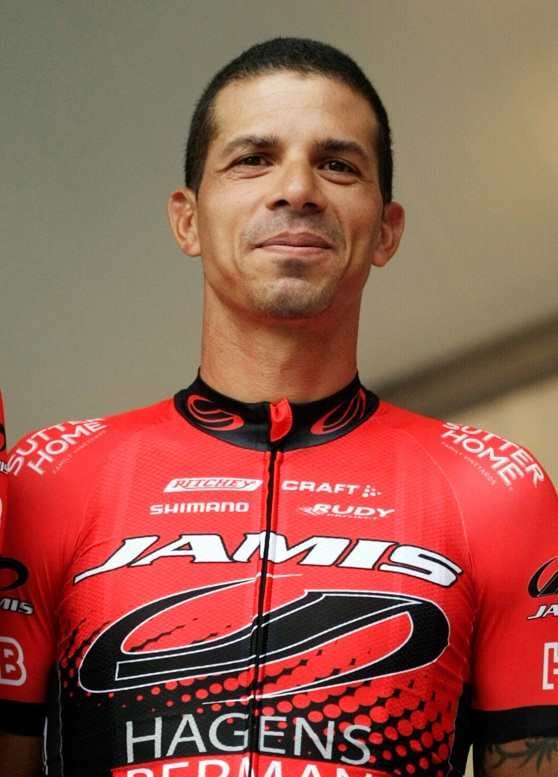
- Amarán at the 2013 USA Pro Cycling Challenge

Personal information
- Full name: Luis Alberto Romero Amarán
- Born: April 7, 1979 (age 47) Matanzas, Cuba

Cycling career
- Sport: Cycling
- Current team: Retired
- Discipline: Road
- Role: Rider

Amateur team
- 2006–2007: Hierros Agüera-Cafemax-Sport Mata

Professional team
- 2008–2016: Colavita–Sutter Home

Major wins
- National Time Trial Championships (1999, 2000, 2001, 2005)

Luis Alberto Romero Amarán (born April 7, 1979 in Matanzas) is a Cuban former cyclist, who competed professionally between 2008 and 2016.

== Major results ==
1999
1st National Time Trial Championships
3rd Overall Vuelta Ciclista de Chile

1st Stage 3

2000
1st National Time Trial Championships
1st Stage 4 Vuelta a Cuba
2001
1st National Time Trial Championships
2nd Overall Vuelta a Cuba
3rd National Road Race Championships
2003
1st Stage 12b Vuelta a Cuba
2005
1st National Time Trial Championships
2nd Overall Vuelta a Cuba
2006
4th GP Capodarco
10th Gara Ciclistica Montappone
2007
1st Stages 5a (ITT) & 5b Vuelta a Tenerife
1st Stage 5 Vuelta a Galicia
1st Stage 4 Vuelta a Ávila
3rd Overall Vuelta a Segovia

1st Stage 3

2008
1st Tour de Toona
1st Stage 3 San Dimas Stage Race
8th Overall Rochester Omnium
2009
6th Overall Tour de San Luis

1st Stage 6

2010
1st Overall Joe Martin Stage Race
5th Overall Tour of the Gila

1st Stage 2

2011
1st Overall Tour of Elk Grove
2012
1st Overall Valley of the Sun Stage Race
1st Stage 2 Tulsa Tough
1st Stage 2 Cascade Classic (ITT)
6th Overall Tour do Rio
9th Overall Tour of Elk Grove
2013
1st Stage 1 Tour de Delta
1st Stage 2 San Dimas Stage Race
1st Stages 2 & 3 Redlands Bicycle Classic
3rd Overall Valley of the Sun Stage Race
3rd Clarendon Cup
2014
1st Stage 4 Tour of the Gila
1st Stage 3 Valley of the Sun Stage Race
3rd Overall Grand Prix Cycliste de Saguenay
