= Tommy Mulkey =

American cyclist

Personal information
- Full name: Thomas White Mulkey
- Born: October 16, 1972 (age 53) Atlanta, Georgia, U.S.

Sport
- Country: United States
- Sport: Cycling
Medal record
Representing United States
Pan American Games
Gold medal – first place	1999 Winnipeg	Team pursuit

Thomas White Mulkey (born October 16, 1972) is an American cyclist. He competed at the 2000 Summer Olympics in Sydney, in the men's team pursuit. Mulkey was born in Atlanta, Georgia.
