= Danny Van Haute =

American cyclist

Personal information
- Born: 22 October 1956 (age 69) Tillsonburg, Ontario, Canada

Cycling career
- Sport: Cycling

Danny Van Haute (/vænˈhaʊt/ van-HOWT; born October 22, 1956) is an American former cyclist. Van Haute qualified for the 1980 U.S. Olympic team but did not compete due to the U.S. Olympic Committee's boycott of the 1980 Summer Olympics in Moscow, Russia. He was one of 461 athletes to receive a Congressional Gold Medal instead. In 1981, Van Haute was one of the original members of the 7-Eleven-Schwinn speed racing team. He did get to compete in the points race event at the 1984 Summer Olympics.

On February 26, 2024 Van Haute was suspended for two years from the International Cycling Federation for fraud during the Argenta Classic in Belgium. He attempted to claim that a mechanic for the female team, Cynisca Cycling, was a competitor in order to meet the minimum number of five riders.
