= Kenny Williams (cyclist) =

American racing cyclist (born 1967)

Personal information
- Born: May 24, 1967 (age 59)

Cycling career
- Sport: Cycling
- Current team: Retired
- Disciplines: Road; Track
- Role: Rider

Kenny Williams (born May 24, 1967) is an American former amateur racing cyclist.

Williams won the 1999 national criterium title Sunday at the U.S. Cycling Federation Road Cycling Championships held in Loveland, Ohio.

Williams and partner Kirk O'Bee came in third place at the Burnaby Six-Day cycling event in January 2008.

Williams was suspended in 2009 for taking the steroid Dehydroepiandrosterone (DHEA) prior to the United States Masters Championships, where he claimed the 3000 metre individual pursuit and kilometre time trial titles.

== Career highlights ==
1. 2001: 1st in Tahuya-Seabeck-Tahuya Road Race (USA)
2. 2003: 1st in National Championship, Track, Pursuit, Elite, United States of America, Leigh Valley (USA)
3. 2003: 3rd in National Championship, Track, Madison, Elite, United States of America, Leigh Valley (USA)
4. 2004: 3rd in National Championship, Road, ITT, Elite, United States of America, Redlands (USA)
5. 2004: 2nd in National Championship, Track, Pursuit, Elite, United States of America, Frisco Superdrome (USA)
6. 2005: 2nd in National Championship, Track, Team Pursuit, Elite, United States of America, Los Angeles (USA)
7. 2007: 2nd in Burnaby, Six Days (CAN)
8. 2007: 3rd in National Championship, Track, Team Pursuit, Elite, United States of America, Carson, CA (USA)
9. 2008: 3rd in Burnaby, Six Days (CAN)
