= Mike Friedman (cyclist) =

American racing cyclist (born 1982)

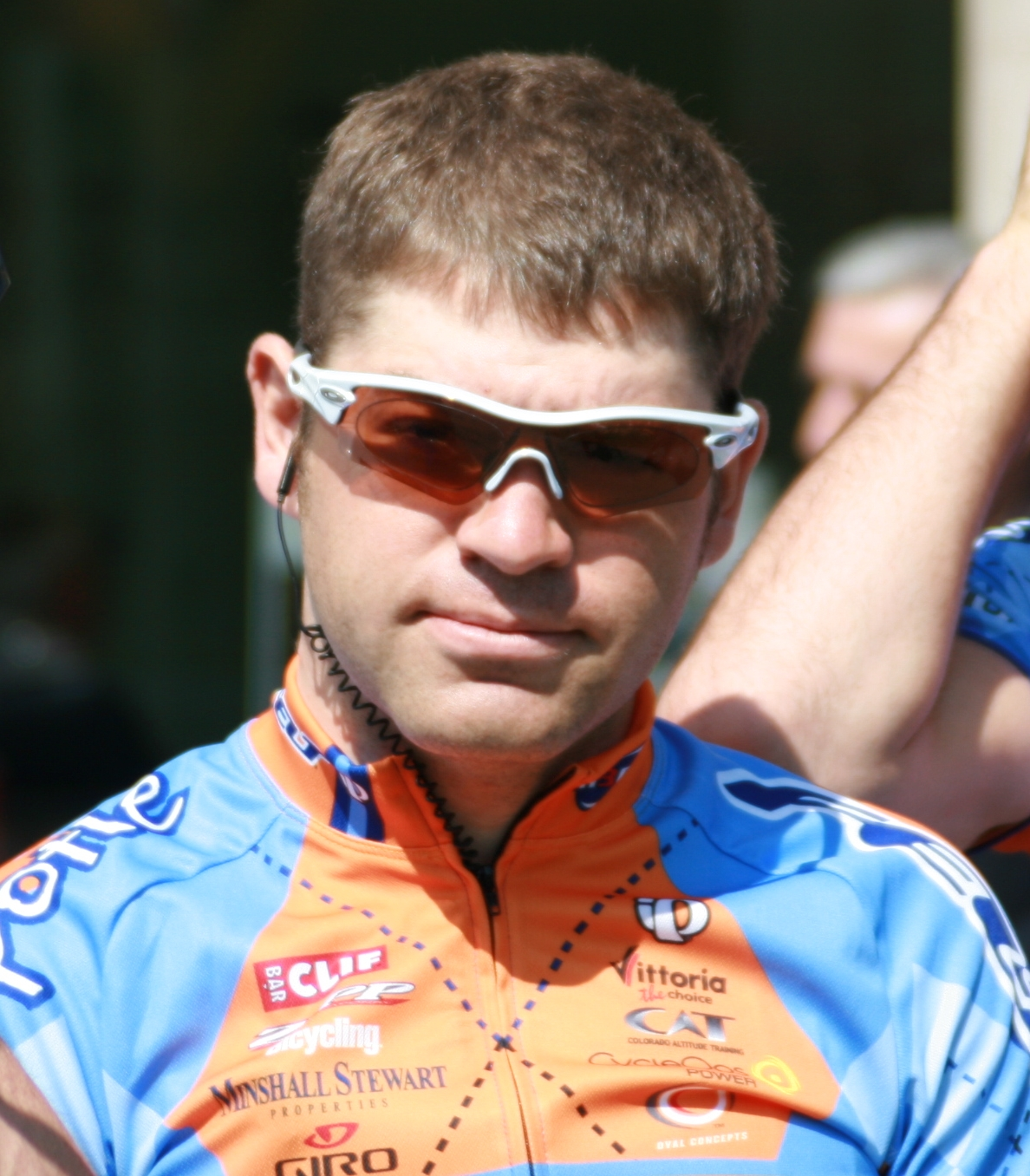
- Friedman in 2008

Personal information
- Full name: Michael Friedman
- Nickname: Meatball
- Born: September 19, 1982 (age 44) Dunkirk, New York, United States
- Height: 5 ft 9 in (1.75 m)
- Weight: 180 lb (82 kg)

Cycling career
- Sport: Cycling
- Current team: Retired
- Disciplines: Road, track
- Role: Rider
- Rider type: Sprinter

Amateur team
- 1999–2005: US National Team

Professional teams
- 2005–2009: TIAA–CREF
- 2010: Jelly Belly–Kenda
- 2011–2014: Kelly Benefit Strategies–OptumHealth

Major wins
- 2005 US National Track Cycling Championships, Team Sprint; 2004 Pan American Championships, Kilo; 2003 Pan-Am Games Qualifier, Team Sprint

Michael Friedman (born September 19, 1982 in Dunkirk, New York) is an American former professional racing cyclist, who competed professionally between 2005 and 2014.

== Major results ==
2005
National Track Championships

1st Team pursuit
2nd Madison

1st Univest Grand Prix
2006
National Track Championships

1st Individual pursuit
1st Madison
1st Team pursuit
2nd Points race
3rd Team sprint

1st Stage 9 International Cycling Classic
3rd Overall Parker Mainstreet Omnium
2007
1st Scratch, 2007–08 UCI Track Cycling World Cup Classics, Beijing
National Track Championships

1st Points race
1st Team pursuit
3rd Individual pursuit
3rd Madison

2nd Overall Tour of Elk Grove
2008
2nd Six Days of Burnaby

== See also ==
- List of Pennsylvania State University Olympians
