= International Tour de Toona =

Pennsylvania in July from 1987 until 2011

Race details
- Date: July
- Region: Altoona, Pennsylvania
- English name: Tour of Altoona
- Nickname(s): Tour de 'Toona
- Discipline: road cycling
- Type: Multi-day multi-stage road race
- Organiser: Altoona Bicycle Club
- Race director: Larry Bilotto

History
- First edition: 1987
- Editions: 22 as stage race, 2 criterium only
- Final edition: 2011

The International Tour de Toona was a stage bicycle race held in Central Pennsylvania in July from 1987 until 2011. The event became the largest pro-am cycling event in North America and had stages spanning Blair, Cambria, Bedford, and Somerset Counties in Pennsylvania. The name was changed to The International for the 2002 edition of the race and then to the International Tour de Toona for the 2004 edition.

In 2008, tour organizers scaled back the event to a one-day criterium race in downtown Altoona. On May 22, 2009, it was announced that the 2009 Tour de Toona would be canceled due to a lack of sponsorship. The 2010 event was again a single day criterium race in downtown Altoona In 2011 the event returned to being a 4-day 4 stage race for both men and women. In 2012, the event was cancelled due to financial mismanagement and the USAC announced the event would not be held again.

== Results ==
=== Overall winners ===
Year	Female Winner	Country	Team	Male Winner	Country	Team
1987	Sarah Costanzo	United States		Greg Yoder	United States	
1988	Kathy Steel	United States		Gunnar Shogren	United States	
1989	Susan DiBiase	United States	Laurel Mountain Velo Club	Greg Yoder	United States	Laurel Mountain Velo Club
1990	Bunki Bankaitis-Davis	United States	US National Team	Julian Dalby	Ireland	Toga Club
1991	Linda Brenneman	United States	TGI Friday's	Brian McDonough	United States	Gotham Cyclists
1992	Karen Bliss-Livingston	United States	Worlds Team	Graeme Miller	New Zealand	BRBC
1993	Eve Stephenson	United States	US National Road Race Team	Scott Mercier	United States	Turin/ACT/Fat City Cycles
1994	Brooke Blackwelder	United States	Body Wise Team	Scott Moninger	United States	Coors Light Team
1995	Phyllis Hines	United States	Montgomery-Bell	Mike Engleman	United States	Team Shaklee
1996	Linda Jackson	Canada	Timex-Cannondale	Scott Mercier	United States	Saturn Cycling Team
1997	Dede Demet	United States	Saturn Cycling Team	Norman Alvis	United States	Saturn Cycling Team
1998	Kendra Wenzel	United States	Saeco Timex	Charles Dionne	Canada	Radio-Energie
1999	Anke Erlank	Russia	Timex	David Clinger	United States	Mercury Cycling Team
2000	Lyne Bessette	Canada	Saturn Cycling Team	Gord Fraser	Canada	Mercury Cycling Team
2001	Geneviève Jeanson	Canada	RONA	Harm Jansen	Netherlands	Saturn Cycling Team
2002	Heather Albert	United States	Goldy's	Danny Pate	United States	Prime Alliance
2003	Lyne Bessette	Canada	Saturn Cycling Team	Tom Danielson	United States	Saturn Cycling Team
2004	Lyne Bessette	Canada	Quark Cycling Team	John Lieswyn	United States	Health Net-Maxxis
2005	Geneviève Jeanson	Canada	The Bicycle Store	Scott Moninger	United States	Health Net-Maxxis
2006	Kristin Armstrong	United States		Sergey Lagutin	Uzbekistan	Navigators Insurance
2007	Kristin Armstrong	United States	Team Lipton	Karl Menzies	Australia	Health Net-Maxxis
2008 Crit only	Laura Van Gilder	United States	Cheerwine Cycling	Luis Amarán	Cuba	Team Cloavita/Sutter Home
2009	no event					
2010 Crit only	Catherine Cheatley	New Zealand	Colavita / Baci Pro Cycling	Jeremy Grimm		Cleveland Clinic Sports Health
2011	Janel Holcomb	United States	Colavita/Forno d'Asolo	Scott Lyttle	New Zealand	Pure Black Racing
