= Erin Hartwell =

American cyclist (born 1969)

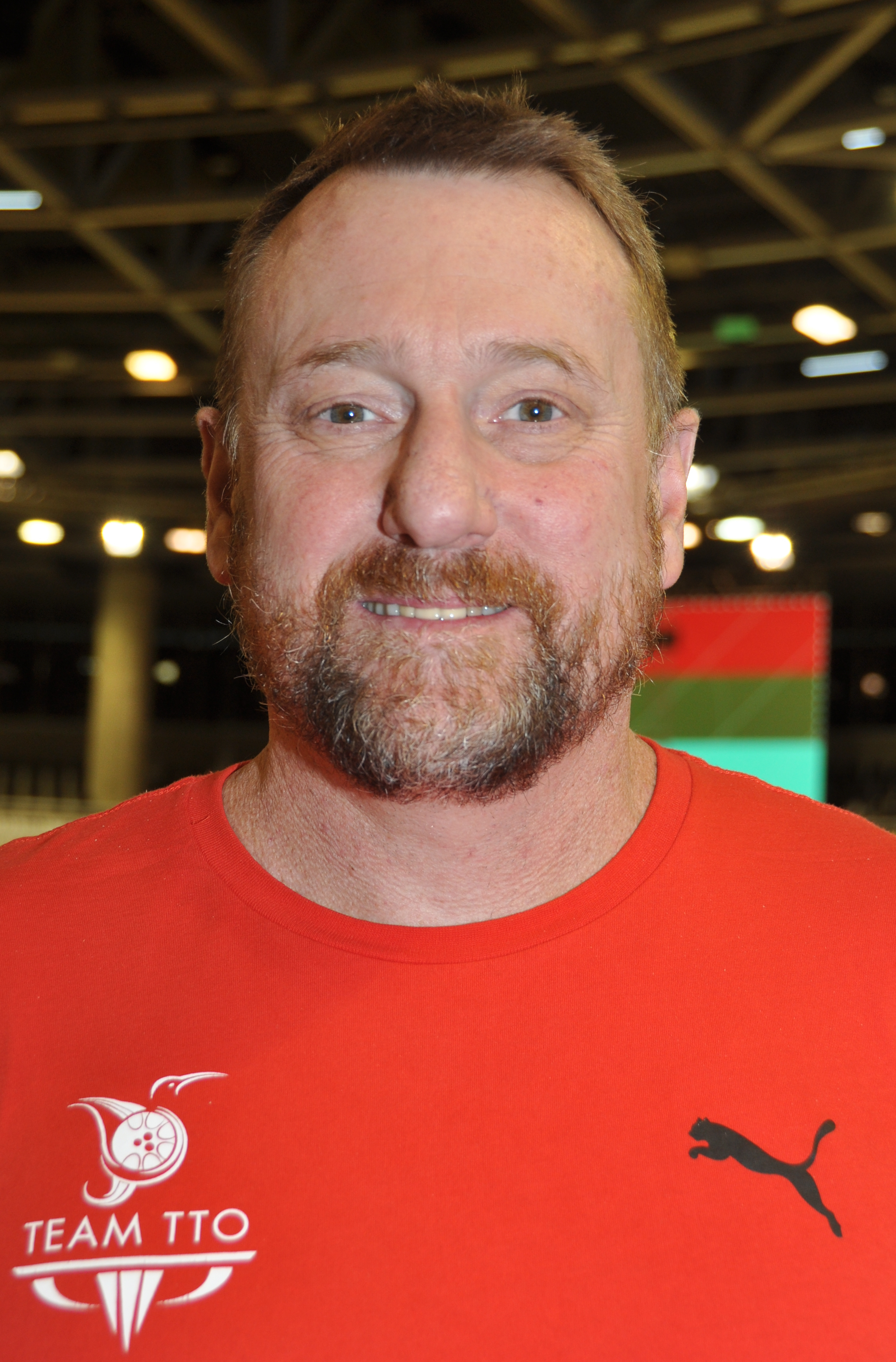
- Hartwell in 2018

Personal information
- Full name: Erin Wesley "Irv" Hartwell
- Born: June 10, 1969 (age 57) Philadelphia, Pennsylvania, U.S.

Cycling career
- Sport: Cycling
- Discipline: Track
Medal record
Men's track cycling
Representing United States
Olympic Games
Silver medal – second place	1996 Atlanta	1000 m time trial
Bronze medal – third place	1992 Barcelona	1000 m time trial
UCI Track World Championships
Bronze medal – third place	1995 Bogota	1000 m time trial
Bronze medal – third place	1995 Bogota	Team sprint
Pan American Games
Silver medal – second place	1991 Havana	1000 m time trial
Silver medal – second place	1995 Mar del Plata	1000 m time trial
Silver medal – second place	1999 Winnipeg	1000 m time trial

Erin Wesley Hartwell (born June 10, 1969) is an American cyclist from Philadelphia. He won the silver medal in the Men's track time trial in the 1996 Summer Olympics and a bronze medal in the Men's track time trial in 1992 Summer Olympics.
