= James Carney (cyclist) =

American cyclist

Personal information
- Born: November 29, 1968 (age 57) Detroit, United States

Cycling career
- Sport: Cycling
Medal record
Representing United States
Pan American Games
Silver medal – second place	1999 Winnipeg	Madison
Bronze medal – third place	2003 Santo Domingo	Madison

James Monroe "J'me" Carney (born November 29, 1968) is an American former professional cyclist. He has made two Olympic Teams (1992 Barcelona, Spain and 2000 Sydney, Australia). In 2000, he placed 5th in the 40 kilometer points race, currently the best finish by an American in that event. Since 2002, Carney elevated his coaching efforts and started to take on aspiring young athletes. In 2008, he took the position of competition director of the Cheerwine Woman's Professional Cycling Team. This team was the #1 ranked women's team in the United States at the conclusion of the season. Over two years, he won many of the premiere U.S. track cycling events. At the age of 42, he finished in 7th place at the Cali, Colombia, World Cup and 5th place at the Beijing, China, World Cup. Carney won his 22nd national title at the 2012 Elite Track National Championships.

Carney has managed and directed nationally ranked elite women's cycling teams. He was the competition director of the Colavita/Fine Cooking Professional Women's Cycling Team for the 2014 race season.

In 2012, Carney was elected to the board of directors for USA Cycling. He also was the representative of cycling for the USOC Athlete Advisory Council and the male athlete representative for the USA Cycling, Inc. track cycling committee.

He is the founder and president of the 501(c)3 non-profit organization C.A.R.E. for Cycling, Inc (2011).

== Major achievements ==
2-time Olympian

- 1992 Barcelona, Spain

- 2000 Sydney, AUS

2-time World Cup Champion

- 2001 Points Race

- 2002 Scratch Race

22-time Elite National Track Champion

2005 UCI Track World Cup #1, scratch race, 1st

2004 National Champion, points race, team pursuit

2003 Pan American Games Bronze Medalist, madison

2002 National Champion, team pursuit, points race, madison, scratch race

2001 National Champion, team pursuit, points race, madison

== See also ==
List of Pennsylvania State University Olympians
