= United States National Road Race Championships =

National road cycling championship in the United States

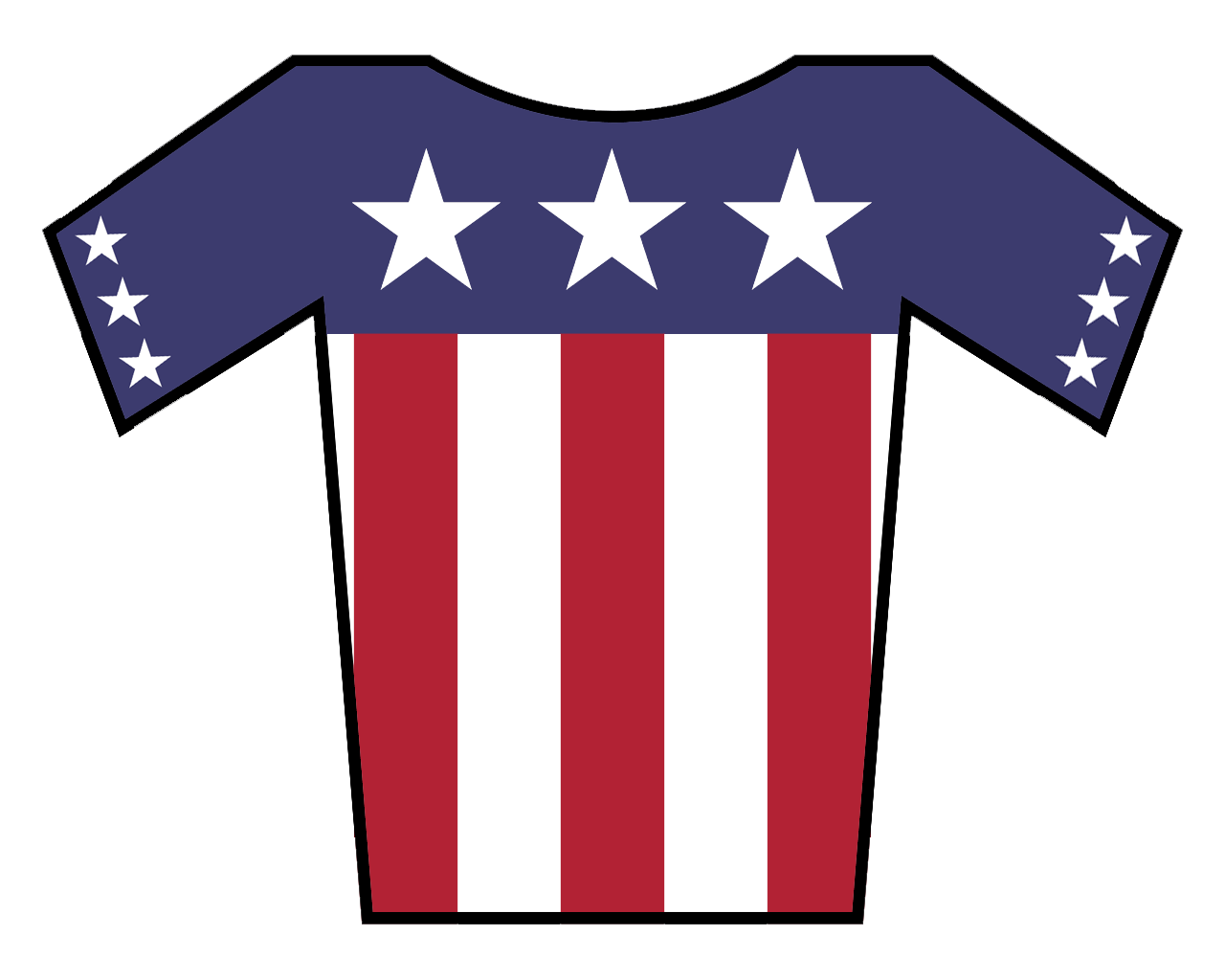
The champions jersey

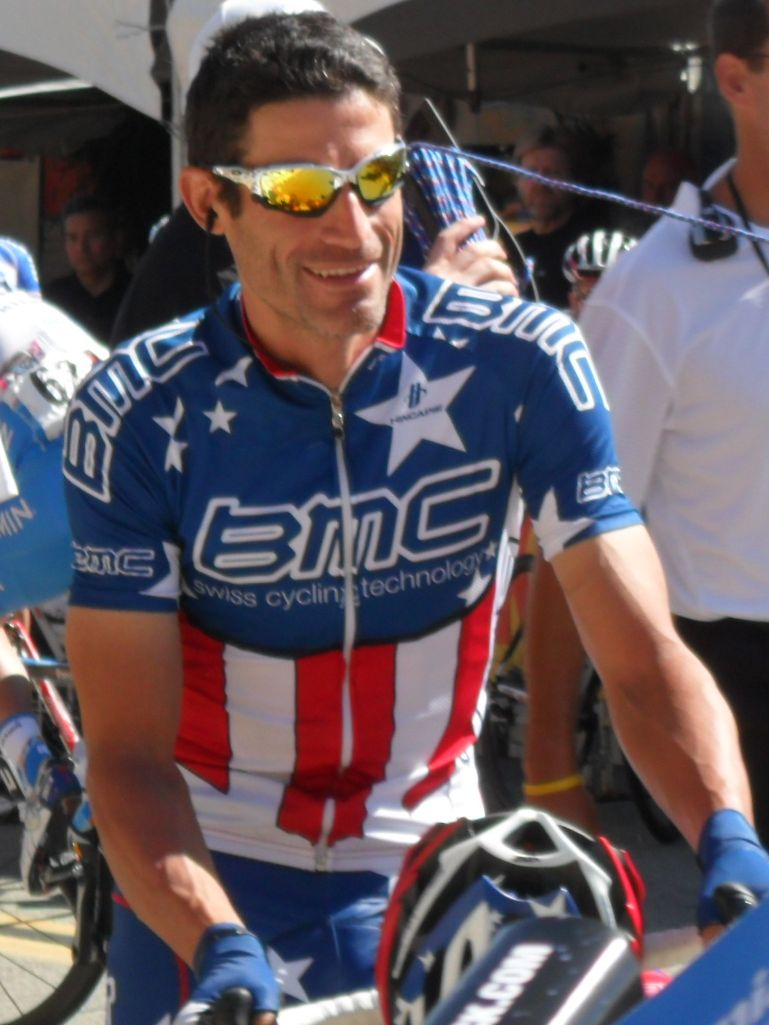
George Hincapie.

The United States National Professional Road Race Championships began in 1985. They are run by the governing body, USA Cycling. Until 2006 the race was open to all nationalities, the first American to finish being named the winner and given a distinctive jersey. Since the championship in Greenville, South Carolina, in 2006, all riders have had to be American.

Before 1985, only the amateur champions were named. From 1921 to 1964, the Amateur Bicycle League of America (ABLA) National Championships were held as an omnium of track-style events for Men, Women, and Juniors, rather than as a road race. In 1964 the American Cycling Newsletter (later Bicycling) reported the results of a Flemington, NJ race as the national road racing championships, but these results do not appear in the USA Cycling list of winners.

== Men ==
=== Amateur ===
Year	Gold	Silver	Bronze
1964	Bob Parsons	Bill Ennis	Harry Morton
1965	Michael Hiltner	Stuart Baillie	John Allis
1966	Bob Tetzlaff		
1967	Bob Parsons	Daniel Butler	John Aschen
1968	John Howard		Jim Van Boven
1969	Alan DeFever	Bill Kund	Dennis Deppe
1970	Mike Carnahan	Mike Levonas	Doug Dale
1971	Steve Dayton	Alan Scholz	Bob Tetzlaff
1972	John Howard	Wayne Stetina	Bob Schneider
1973	John Howard	Bob Schneider	Rick Ball
1974	John Allis	Thomas Officer	Dave Chauner
1975	John Howard	Thomas Officer	Marc Thompson
1976	Wayne Stetina	Dave Boll	Tom Schuler
1977	Wayne Stetina	Mark Pringle	David Ware
1978	Dale Stetina	Thomas Prehn	Rudolph Sroka
1979	Steve Wood	Tom Doughty	Dave Ware
1980	Dale Stetina	Wayne Stetina	Jeff Bradley
1981	Tom Broznowski	Larry Shields	Jeff Bradley
1982	Greg Demgen	Larry Shields	Tom Schuler
1983	Ron Keifel	Alexi Grewal	Doug Shapiro
1984	Matt Eaton	Thomas Prehn	Tom Broznowski
1985	Wayne Stetina	Gerry Fornes	
1986	Doug Smith	Dan Vogt	Gordon Holterman

=== Professional ===
Year	Gold	Silver	Bronze
1985	Eric Heiden	Tom Broznowski	Tom Schuler
1986	Thomas Prehn	Douglas Shapiro	Thurlow Thomas Rogers
1987	Tom Schuler	Roy Knickman	Gary Fornes
1988	Ron Kiefel	Douglas Shapiro	Karl Maxon
1989	Greg Oravetz	Michael Engleman	Alexi Grewal
1990	Kurt Stockton	Andy Bishop	Greg Oravetz
1991	Davis Phinney	Kurt Stockton	Michael Engleman
1992	Bart Bowen	Andy Bishop	Taylor Centauri
1993	Lance Armstrong	Scott McKinley	Jamie Paolinetti
1994	Steve Hegg	Scott Fortner	Jamie Paolinetti
1995	Norman Alvis	Clark Sheehan	Lance Armstrong
1996	Eddy Gragus	Fred Rodriguez	Chris Horner
1997	Bart Bowen	Frank McCormack	Jonathan Vaughters
1998	George Hincapie	Frank McCormack	Mark McCormack
1999	Marty Jemison	Fred Rodriguez	(Guatemala) Anton Villatoro
2000	Fred Rodriguez	George Hincapie	John Lieswyn
2001	Fred Rodriguez	Trent Klasna	George Hincapie
2002	Chann McRae	Danny Pate	George Hincapie
2003	Mark McCormack	Kevin Monahan	David Clinger
2004	Fred Rodriguez	Kirk O'Bee	Russell Hamby
2005	Chris Wherry	Danny Pate	Chris Horner
2006	George Hincapie	Levi Leipheimer	Danny Pate
2007	Levi Leipheimer	George Hincapie	Neil Shirley
2008	Tyler Hamilton	Blake Caldwell	Danny Pate
2009	George Hincapie	Andrew Bajadali	Jeff Louder
2010	Ben King	Alex Candelario	Kiel Reijnen
2011	Matthew Busche	George Hincapie	Ted King
2012	Timmy Duggan	Frank Pipp	Kiel Reijnen
2013	Fred Rodriguez	Brent Bookwalter	Kiel Reijnen
2014	Eric Marcotte	Travis McCabe	Alex Howes
2015	Matthew Busche	Joe Dombrowski	Kiel Reijnen
2016	Gregory Daniel	Alex Howes	Travis McCabe
2017	Larry Warbasse	Neilson Powless	Alexey Vermeulen
2018	Jonathan Brown	Robin Carpenter	Jacob Rathe
2019	Alex Howes	Stephen Bassett	Neilson Powless
2020	Not held due to the COVID-19 pandemic		
2021	Joey Rosskopf	Brent Bookwalter	Kyle Murphy
2022	Kyle Murphy	Tyler Stites	Magnus Sheffield
2023	Quinn Simmons	Tyler Williams	Tyler Stites
2024	Sean Quinn	Brandon McNulty	Neilson Powless
2025	Quinn Simmons	Evan Boyle	Gavin Hlady
2026	Quinn Simmons	Kevin Vermaerke	Lawrence Warbasse

=== U23 ===
Year	Gold	Silver	Bronze
2003	Jonathan Erdelyi	Darby Thomas	Michael Voigt
2004	Ian MacGregor	Blake Caldwell	Timmy Duggan
2005	Ian MacGregor	Tyler Farrar	Michael Lange
2006	Craig Lewis	Brent Bookwalter	
2007	Max Jenkins		Todd Nordblom
2008	Kirk Carlsen	Peter Stetina	Tom Peterson
2009	Alex Howes	Scott Stewart	Ben King
2010	Ben King	Alex Howes	Andrew Dahlheim
2011	Rob Squire	Jacob Rathe	Evan Huffman
2012	Robert Bush	Tanner Putt	Gavin Mannion
2013	Tanner Putt	Nathan Brown	Tyler Magner
2014	Tanner Putt	Keegan Swirbul	Taylor Eisenhart
2015	Keegan Swirbull	Gregory Daniel	Colin Joyce
2016	Geoffrey Curran	Neilson Powless	Tyler Williams
2017	Neilson Powless	Gage Hecht	Brendan Rhim
2018	Alex Hoehn	Noah Granigan	Zeke Mostov
2019	Lance Haidet	Cooper Willsey	Cameron Beard
2020	Not held due to the COVID-19 pandemic		
2021	Sean McElroy	Lucas Bourgoyne	Ethan Overson
2022	Cooper Johnson	Lucas Boe	Liam Flanagan
2023	Owen Cole	Colby Simmons	Tobias Klein
2024	Gavin Hlady	Brody McDonald	Colby Simmons
2025	Gavin Hlady	Dylan Zakrajsek	Alfredo Bueno

=== Junior ===
Year	Gold	Silver	Bronze
1967	Jim Van Boven	Lawrence (Larry) Holm	Tracy Wakefield
1968	Tracy Wakefield		
1969	Don Westfall	Tracy Wakefield	
1970	Henry Whitney		
1971	Ralph Therrio		
1972	Ted Waterbury	Dave Spohn	Keith Vierra
1973	Pat Nielsen	Scott Damuth	Dale Stetina
1974	David Mayer-Oakes	Pat Nielsen	Tom Schuler
1975	Larry Shields	John Chamberlain	Tom Dineen
1976	Larry Shields		
1978	Jeff Bradley	Greg LeMond	Steve Wood
1979	Greg LeMond	Robert Comeau	Mark Frise
1980	Sterling McBride	Peter Hanson	Shawn Storm
1981	Mike Jensen	Jeff Slack	Marshall Hirsch
1982	Roy Knickman	Albert Ranieri	Gordon Holterman
1983	Roy Knickman	Lowell Kellogg	Dan Fox
1984	Freddy Booz	Dan Vogt	Frankie Andreu
1985			
1986	Mike McCarthy	Taylor Centauri	Hugh McCann
1987	Chann McRae	Tim Johnson	Lance Armstrong
1988	Jonas Carney	Bobby Julich	
1989	Jonas Carney		
1990	Eric Harris		
1991	Fred Rodriguez		
1992	Matthew Johnson		
1993	Sean Nealy		
1994	Jonathan Page		
1995	Roberto Dapice		
1996	Andrew Crater		
1998	Will Frischkorn		
1999	Brad Buccambuso		
2000	Rahsaan Bahati		
2001	Dane Jankowiak		
2002	Josh Kerkoff		
2003	Zak Grabowski	Keith Norris	Chad Beyer
2004	Thomas Peterson	Chad Beyer	Alexander Boyd
2005	Peter Stetina	Tejay van Garderen	Nick Frey
2006	Chris Barton	Benjamin Bradshaw	Alex Howes
2007	Ben King		
2008	Evan Huffman	Taylor Kuphaldt	Marshall Opel
2009	Max Durtschi	Nathaniel Wilson	Steven Black
2010	Lawson Craddock	Tanner Putt	Daniel Farinha
2011	Alexey Vermeulen	Colin Joyce	Gregory Daniel
2012	Miguel Bryon	Logan Owen	Ansel Dickey
2013	Logan Owen	Stephen Bassett	Curtis White
2014	Jonathan Brown	Noah Granigan	David Lombardo
2015	Jonathan Brown	Gage Hecht	Willem Kaiser
2016	Gage Hecht	Brandon McNulty	Kevin Goguen
2017	Cole Davis	Kevin Verkmaerke	Charles Velez
2018	Quinn Simmons	Lane Maher	Sean Quinn
2019	Gianni Lamperti	Seth Callahan	Logan McLain
2020	Not held due to the COVID-19 pandemic		
2021	Colby Simmons	Ethan Villaneda	Artem Shmidt
2022	Viggo Moore	Artem Shmidt	Henry Neff
2023	Darren Parham	Luke Fetzer	Elias Saigh
2024	Ashlin Barry	Braden Reitz	Adrian Gromen
2025	Kash Adamski	Brady Hogue	Ashlin Barry

== Women ==
=== Elite ===
Year	Gold	Silver	Bronze
1966	Audrey McElmury	Nancy Burghart	Jeanne Omelenchuk
1967	Nancy Burghart	Jeanette Hawley	Kathy Fitzpatrick
1968	Nancy Burghart		
1969	Donna Tobias (cyclist)	Jeanne Omelenchuk	Judith Hess
1970	Audrey McElmury	Donna Tobias (cyclist)	Kathy Ecroth
1971	Mary Jane Reoch		
1972	Debbie Bradley	Jeanne Omelenchuk	Eileen Brennan
1973	Eileen Brennan	Carole Brennan	Linda Stein
1974	Jane Robinson	Margy Saunders	Kim Mumford
1975	Linda Stein	Mary Jane Reoch	Carole Brennan
1976	Connie Carpenter	Mary Jane Reoch	Susan Gurney
1977	Connie Carpenter	Jane Buyny	Barbara Hintzen
1978	Barbara Hintzen	Betsy Davis	Connie Carpenter
1979	Connie Carpenter	Beth Heiden	Mary Jane Reoch
1980	Beth Heiden	Heidi Hopkins	Mary Jane Reoch
1981	Connie Carpenter	Cindy Olavarri	Madelyn Roese
1982	Sue Novara	Jacque Bradley	Rebecca Twigg
1983	Rebecca Twigg	Janelle Parks	Cindy Olavarri
1984	Rebecca Daughton		
1985	Rebecca Daughton		
1986	Katrin Tobin		
1987	Janelle Parks		
1988	Inga Thompson		
1989	Juli Furtado		
1990	Ruthie Matthes	Marion Clignet	Karen Livingston-Bliss
1991	Inga Thompson	Maureen Manley	Ruthie Matthes
1992	Jeanne Golay	Inga Thompson	Linda Brenneman
1993	Inga Thompson	Karen Kurreck	Alison Dunlap
1994	Jeanne Golay	Deirdre Demet-Barry	Carmen Richardson
1995	Jeanne Golay	Laura Charameda	Julie Young
1996	Deirdre Demet-Barry	Heather Albert-Hall	Alison Dunlap
1997	Louisa Jenkins	Mari Holden	Deirdre Demet-Barry
1998	Pamela Schuster	Kendra Wenzel	Deirdre Demet-Barry
1999	Mari Holden	Julie Young	Kendra Wenzel
2000	Nicole Freedman	Pamela Schuster	Mina Pizzini
2001	Kimberly Bruckner Baldwin	Amber Neben	Suzanne Sonye
2002	Jessica Phillips	Amber Neben	Tina Pic
2004	Kristin Armstrong	Christine Thorburn	Tina Pic
2005	Katheryn Curi Mattis	Lynn Gaggioli	Tina Pic
2006	Kristin Armstrong	Christine Thorburn	Amber Neben
2007	Mara Abbott	Kristin Armstrong	Amber Neben
2008	Brooke Miller	Tina Pic	Katharine Carroll
2009	Meredith Miller	Chrissy Ruiter	Kristin LaSasso
2010	Mara Abbott	Shelley Evans	Carmen Small
2011	Robin Farina	Andrea Dvorak	Amanda Miller
2012	Megan Guarnier	Lauren Hall	Carmen Small
2013	Jade Wilcoxson	Lauren Hall	Alison Powers
2014	Alison Powers	Megan Guarnier	Evelyn Stevens
2015	Megan Guarnier	Coryn Rivera	Tayler Wiles
2016	Megan Guarnier	Coryn Rivera	Mandy Heintz
2017	Amber Neben	Coryn Rivera	Ruth Winder
2018	Coryn Rivera	Megan Guarnier	Emma White
2019	Ruth Winder	Coryn Rivera	Emma White
2020	Not held due to the COVID-19 pandemic		
2021	Lauren Stephens	Coryn Labecki	Veronica Ewers
2022	Emma Langley	Lauren De Crescenzo	Lauren Stephens
2023	Chloe Dygert	Coryn Labecki	Sklyar Schneider
2024	Kristen Faulkner	Ruth Winder	Coryn Labecki
2025	Kristen Faulkner	Lauren Stephens	Katherine Sarkisov
2026	Kate Courtney (cyclist)	Lauren Stephens	Grace Arlandson

== See also ==
- United States National Criterium Championships
- United States National Time Trial Championships
- United States National Road Race Championships (historical) 1921-1964
