= United States National Time Trial Championships =

National road cycling championship in the United States

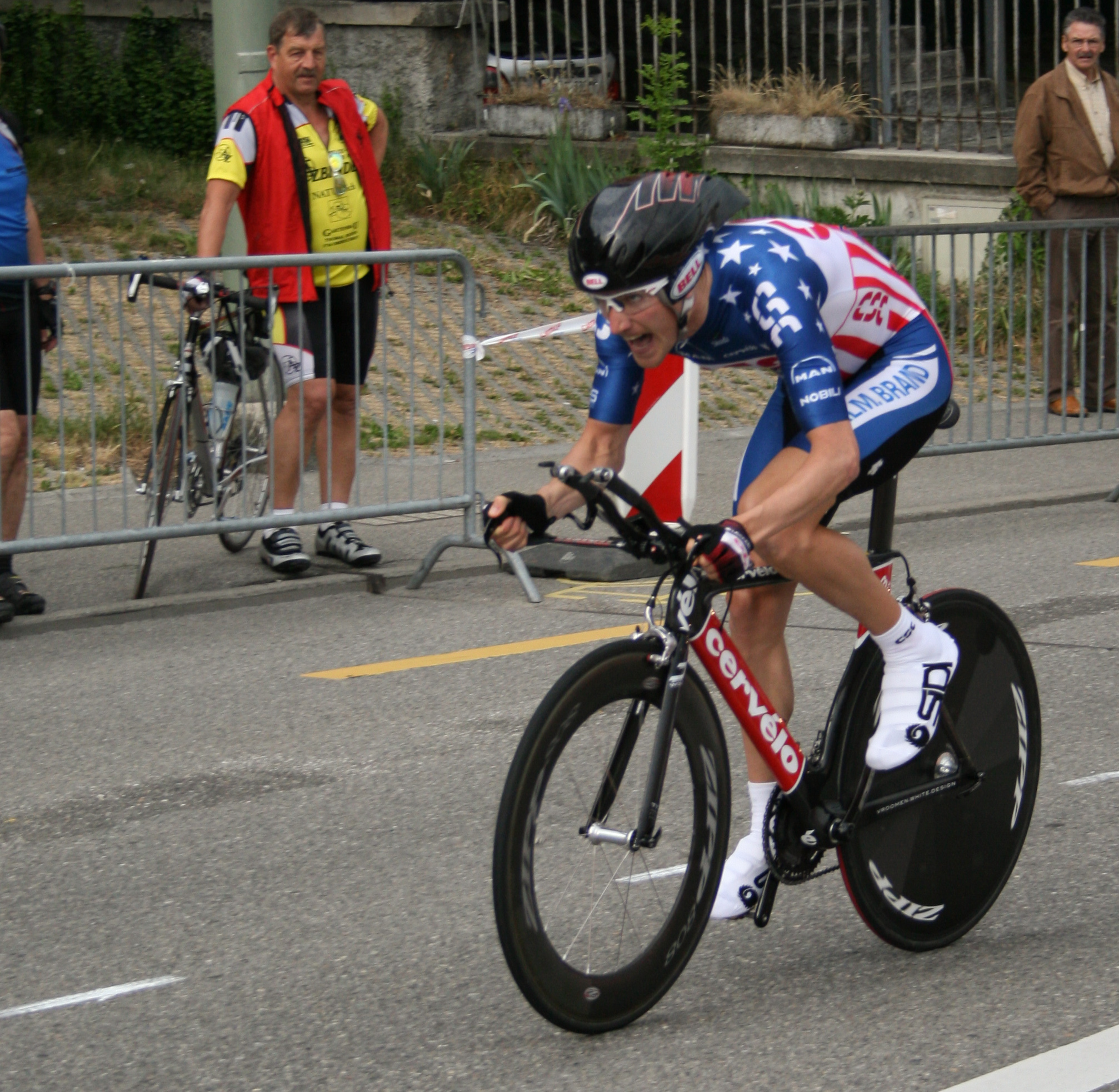
David Zabriskie

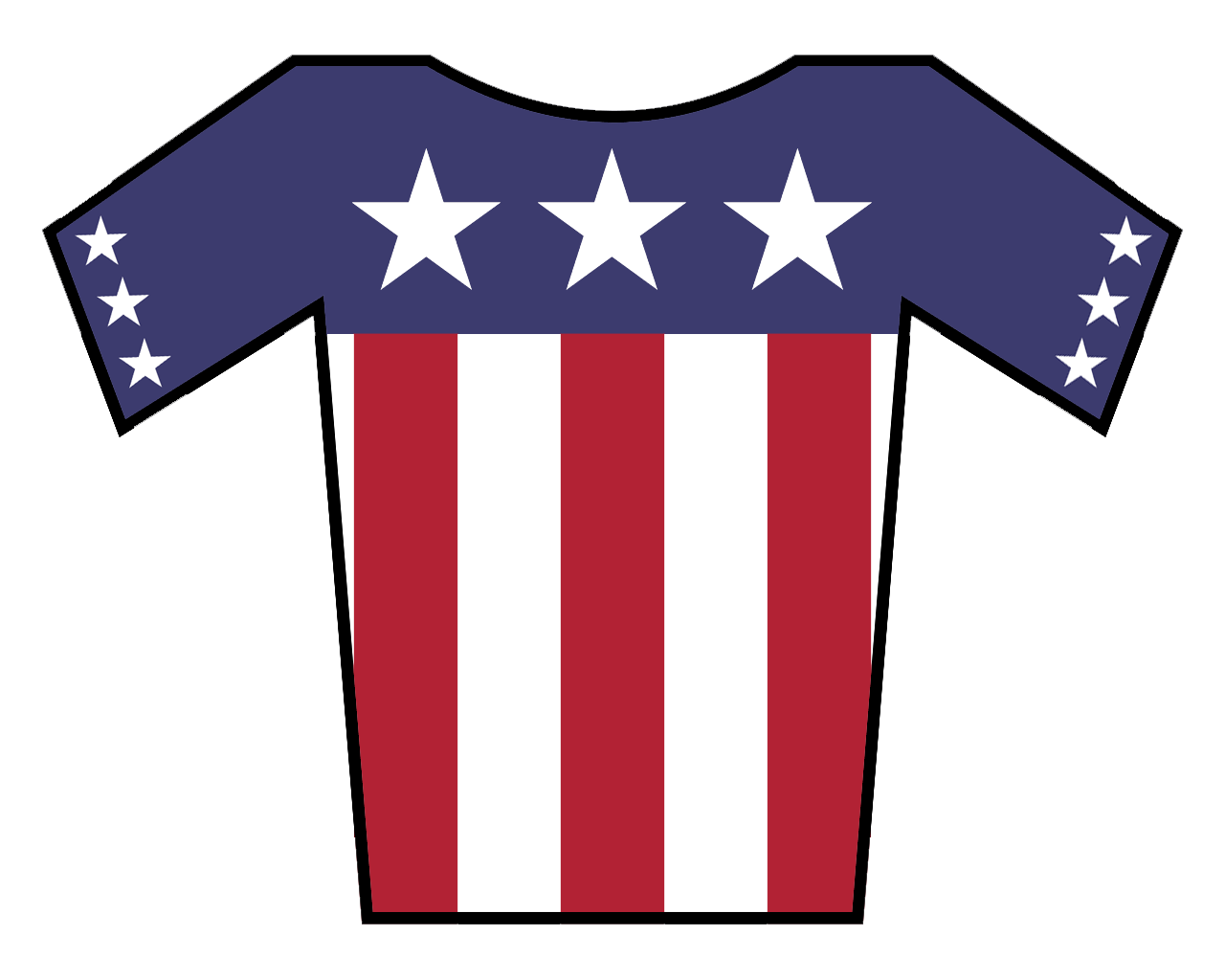
The champions jersey

The United States National Time Trial Championships are held annually to decide the American champions in this cycling discipline, across various age and gender categories. Originally, in 1975, the time trial event distance was 25 miles. It later changed to 40 km, and still later changed to the current distance of 32.3 kilometers (20.1 miles).

The winners of each event are awarded with a symbolic cycling jersey which is red, white and blue, just like the national flag, these colors can be worn by the rider at other time trialling events in the country to show their status as national champion. The champion's stripes can be combined into a sponsored rider's team kit design for this purpose.

In the past, professional riders were included in the United States Cycling Federation's Elite Men's National Time Trial Championship event. But since the professional aspect of the sport continues to grow in America, a separate championship for male professional riders was introduced in 2006, known as the USPRO championships. They were held along with the USPRO Road Race championships in Greenville, South Carolina, on Labor Day weekend, on a 32.3 km course (20.1 miles), the same course has been used for each USPRO championship since. This championship is open to any male U.S. citizen on a UCI-registered trade team. This introduction of a professional championship is contrary to the development of the sport in many other countries, in Great Britain for example, separate championships for amateur and professional riders were scrapped in the early nineties, this allowed many unsponsored riders to gain recognition by competing directly against their sponsored counterparts.

== Multiple winners ==
Men

Wins	Rider	Years
~~7~~ 6	David Zabriskie	~~2004~~, 2006, 2007, 2008, 2009, 2011, 2012
3	Andrew Weaver	1978, 1979, 1982
3	Steve Hegg	1990, 1995, 1996
3	Taylor Phinney	2010, 2014, 2016
2	Tom Doughty	1980, 1981
2	Kent Bostick	1985, 1991
2	Dylan Casey	1998, 2000
2	Chris Baldwin	2003, 2005
2	Brandon McNulty	2023, 2024
2	Joey Rosskopf	2017, 2018
2	Lawson Craddock	2021, 2022

Women

Wins	Rider	Years
5	Mari Holden	1995, 1996, 1998, 1999, 2000
4	Kristin Armstrong	2005, 2006, 2007, 2015
4	Amber Neben	2012, 2017, 2018, 2019
3	Rebecca Twigg	1982, 1993, 1994
3	Kimberly Baldwin	2001, 2002, 2003
2	Lyn Lemaire	1976, 1977
2	Beth Heiden	1979, 1980
2	Jeanne Golay	1989, 1992
2	Inga Thompson	1990, 1991
2	Alison Powers	2008, 2014
2	Evelyn Stevens	2011, 2012
2	Carmen Small	2013, 2016
2	Chloe Dygert	2021, 2023

== Men ==
=== Elite ===
Year	Gold	Silver	Bronze
1975	Wayne Stetina	John Howard	Bill Gallagher
1976	John Howard	Tom Margevicius	Harold Klein
1977	Paul Deem	Alan Kingsbery	Bill Watkins
1978	Andrew Weaver	Tom Doughty	Tom Sain
1979	Andrew Weaver	Tom Doughty	George Mount
1980	Tom Doughty	Kevin Lutz	Wayne Stetina
1981	Tom Doughty	Wayne Stetina	Dale Stetina
1982	Andrew Weaver		
1983	Ron Kiefel	Kevin Lutz	Andrew Paulin
1984	Thurlow Rogers		
1985	Kent Bostick		
1986	Karl Maxon		
1987	Norman Alvis		
1988	John Frey		
1989	Nathan Sheafor		
1990	Steve Hegg		
1991	Kent Bostick		
1992	John Stenner		
1993	Scott Mercer		
1994	Clay Moseley		
1995	Steve Hegg		
1996	Steve Hegg		
1997	Jonathan Vaughters	Norman Alvis	Colby Pearce
1998	Dylan Casey	Norman Alvis	Frank McCormack
1999	Levi Leipheimer	Steve Hegg	Chris Wherry
2000	Adham Sbeih	John Lieswyn	Steve Hegg
2001	Trent Klasna	Adham Sbeih	Doug Ziewacz
2002	Dylan Casey	Chris Horner	Chris Baldwin
2003	Chris Baldwin	Tom Danielson	Jason McCartney
2004	~~David Zabriskie~~	John Lieswyn	Kenny Williams
2005	Chris Baldwin	Jeff Louder	Bernard Van Ulden
2006	David Zabriskie	Chris Baldwin	Jason McCartney
2007	David Zabriskie	Danny Pate	Timothy Duggan
2008	David Zabriskie	Tom Zirbel	Christian Vande Velde
2009	David Zabriskie	Scott Zwizanski	Bernard Van Ulden
2010	Taylor Phinney	Levi Leipheimer	Bernard Van Ulden
2011	David Zabriskie	Tom Zirbel	Matthew Busche
2012	David Zabriskie	Tejay van Garderen	Brent Bookwalter
2013	Tom Zirbel	Brent Bookwalter	Nate Brown
2014	Taylor Phinney	Tom Zirbel	David Williams
2015	Andrew Talansky	Ben King	David Williams
2016	Taylor Phinney	Tom Zirbel	Alexey Vermeulen
2017	Joey Rosskopf	Brent Bookwalter	Neilson Powless
2018	Joey Rosskopf	Chad Haga	Brent Bookwalter
2019	Ian Garrison	Neilson Powless	George Simpson
2020	Not held due to the COVID-19 pandemic		
2021	Lawson Craddock	Chad Haga	Tejay van Garderen
2022	Lawson Craddock	Magnus Sheffield	George Simpson
2023	Brandon McNulty	Will Barta	Joey Rosskopf
2024	Brandon McNulty	Tyler Stites	Neilson Powless
2025	Artem Shmidt	Anders Johnson	Joshua Lebo

=== U23 ===
Year	Gold	Silver	Bronze
2000	David Zabriskie	Michael Creed	Brandon Lovick
2001	Michael Creed		
2002	Michael Creed		
2003	Michael Creed	Timothy Duggan	William Frischkorn
2004	Tyler Farrar	Timothy Duggan	Blake Caldwell
2005	Steven Cozza	Brent Bookwalter	Blake Caldwell
2006	Brent Bookwalter	Steven Cozza	Zachary Grabowski
2007	Nick Frey	Graham Howard	Tejay van Garderen
2008	Peter Stetina	Robert Sweeting	Taylor Shelden
2009	Peter Stetina	Bjørn Selander	Tejay van Garderen
2010	Andrew Talansky	Carter Jones	David Williams
2011	Nathan Brown	Lawson Craddock	Eamon Lucas
2012	Evan Huffman	Lawson Craddock	Nathan Brown
2013	Nathan Brown	Tyler Magner	Steven Perezluha
2014	Taylor Eisenhart	Robin Carpenter	Benjamin Wolfe
2015	Daniel Eaton	Alexey Vermeulen	Gregory Daniel
2016	Geoffrey Curran	Neilson Powless	Adrien Costa
2017	Brandon McNulty	Will Barta	Neilson Powless
2018	Gage Hecht	Matteo Jorgenson	Zeke Mostov
2019	Ian Garrison	Gage Hecht	Conor Schunk
2020	Not held due to the COVID-19 pandemic		
2021	Michael Garrison	Jack Bardi	Tyrel Fuchs
2022	Patrick Welch	Jared Scott	Michael Garrison
2023	Viggo Moore	Evan Boyle	Cooper Johnson
2024	Artem Shmidt	Troy Fields	Owen Cole
2025	Cole Kessler	Owen Cole	Garin Kelley

== Women ==
Year	Gold	Silver	Bronze
1975	Mary Jane Reoch	Lyn Lemaire	Margy Saunders
1976	Lyn Lemaire	Mary Jane Reoch	Hannah North
1977	Lyn Lemaire	Mary Jane Reoch	Connie Carpenter
1978	Esther Salmi	Lyn Lemaire	Cary Peterson
1979	Beth Heiden	Connie Carpenter	Mary Jane Reoch
1980	Beth Heiden	Mary Jane Reoch	Betsy Davis
1981	Connie Carpenter	Hannah North	Cindy Olavarri
1982	Rebecca Twigg	Connie Carpenter	
1983	Cindy Olavarri	Deborah Shumway	Susan Ehlers
1984	Patti Cashman		
1985	Elizabeth Larsen		
1986	Jane Marshall		
1987	Inga Benedict		
1988	Phyllis Hines		
1989	Jeanne Golay		
1990	Inga Thompson		
1991	Inga Thompson		
1992	Jeanne Golay		
1993	Rebecca Twigg	Karen Kurreck	
1994	Rebecca Twigg		
1995	Mari Holden	Jeanne Golay	Deirdre Demet-Barry
1996	Mari Holden	Alison Dunlap	Linda Brenneman
1997	Elizabeth Emery	Deirdre Demet-Barry	Rebecca Twigg
1998	Mari Holden	Karen Kurreck	Giana Roberge-Goldberg
1999	Mari Holden	Elizabeth Emery	Emily Robbins
2000	Mari Holden	Karen Kurreck	Pamela Schuster
2001	Kimberly Bruckner Baldwin	Mari Holden	Pamela Schuster
2002	Kimberly Bruckner Baldwin	Amber Neben	Tina Pic
2003	Kimberly Bruckner Baldwin	Deirdre Demet-Barry	Amber Neben
2004	Christine Thorburn	Amber Neben	Deirdre Demet-Barry
2005	Kristin Armstrong	Amber Neben	Christine Thorburn
2006	Kristin Armstrong	Amber Neben	Christine Thorburn
2007	Kristin Armstrong	Amber Neben	Christine Thorburn
2008	Alison Powers	Mara Abbott	Christine Ruiter
2009	Jessica Phillips	Evelyn Stevens	Alison Powers
2010	Evelyn Stevens	Amber Neben	Mara Abbott
2011	Evelyn Stevens	Amber Neben	Kristin Armstrong
2012	Amber Neben	Evelyn Stevens	Alison Powers
2013	Carmen Small	Kristin McGrath	Alison Powers
2014	Alison Powers	Carmen Small	Tayler Wiles
2015	Kristin Armstrong	Carmen Small	Amber Neben
2016	Carmen Small	Amber Neben	Kristin Armstrong
2017	Amber Neben	Lauren Stephens	Leah Thomas
2018	Amber Neben	Tayler Wiles	Emma White
2019	Amber Neben	Chloé Dygert	Leah Thomas
2020	Not held due to the COVID-19 pandemic		
2021	Chloé Dygert	Amber Neben	Leah Thomas
2022	Leah Thomas	Amber Neben	Lauren Stephens
2023	Chloé Dygert	Lauren Stephens	Amber Neben
2024	Taylor Knibb	Kristen Faulkner	Amber Neben
2025	Emily Ehrlich	Kristen Faulkner	Alia Shafi

== See also ==
- United States National Criterium Championships
- United States National Road Race Championships
