= Stetina =

Stetina (Czech: Štětina, feminine: Štětinová; Slovak: Štetina, feminine: Štetinová) is a surname. Notable people with the surname include:

- Dale Stetina (born 1956), American racing cyclist
- Ilona Stetina (1855–1932), Romanian educator and women's rights activist
- Jaromír Štětina (1943–2025), Czech journalist and politician
- Lukáš Štetina (born 1991), Slovak footballer
- Peter Stetina (born 1987), American off-road cyclist
- Troy Stetina (born 1963), American guitarist
- Vít Štětina (born 1989), Czech footballer
- Wayne Stetina (born 1953), American cyclist

== See also ==
- Szczecina, a Polish cognate
