= Fitchburg Longsjo Classic =

American road cycling race

Fitchburg Longsjo Classic, also known as the Longsjo Classic, was an annual bicycle race held in Fitchburg, Massachusetts, United States. The race began in 1960 as the Arthur M. Longsjo Jr Memorial Race, in honor of Art Longsjo.

== History ==
The race was founded in Fitchburg, Massachusetts in 1960, as the Arthur M. Longsjo Jr. Memorial Bicycle Race., in memory of Fitchburg native and resident Art Longsjo. In 1956 Longsjo competed in the Winter Olympics as a speed skater and at the Summer Olympics as a cyclist, making him the first American to compete in Summer and Winter Olympic Games in one year. In 1958, Longsjo Perished in a car crash in Vermont, while driving home after winning the 180-mile long Quebec-Montreal Road Race. In 1960, local civic and business leaders in the city and Art Longsjo's widow Terry Longsjo organized the first race, with input from Longsjo's racing friend Guy Morin. In 1980, a new race organizing committee formed, which renamed the event the Fitchburg Longsjo Classic. The race was one of the leading bicycle competitions in the United States during this time, as evidenced by the well-known riders on the winners' list.

In 1991, the race expanded to a four-day stage race format, which continued through 2010. Stages included a time trial, a circuit race on a 3-mile loop in the Fitchburg State University area, a road race in Princeton and Westminster that finished atop Mount Wachusett, and the traditional downtown Fitchburg criterium. As a stage race, the event was one of the largest pro-am bicycle stage races in the country and part of the various national calendar races of the period.

In 2011, the race was planned to be changed from a four-day event to one day, due to financial and organizational difficulties, but was cancelled due to a building fire on the downtown racecourse. The fire occurred on June 13 at the Johnsonia Building; the race was not able to occur due to many of the streets that were in the race's pathway being closed. A 2012 multi-stage event was planned; however, the race was cancelled on June 11.

In 2013, the race was revived by the newly created Art Longsjo Foundation as a two-day event, with a criterium in downtown Leominster in addition to the traditional Fitchburg race. A criterium in downtown Worcester was added to the event from 2014 through 2016. 2017 and 2018 included downtown races in Leominster and Fitchburg. In 2019, only the downtown Fitchburg race was held. On March 18, 2020, the Art Longsjo Foundation announced the end of the event, citing the difficulty of procuring sponsorship money from local businesses, as well as the sharp decline in riders entries over the last 5–10 years, as seen throughout the US.

== Past winners ==
The following gives Fitchburg Criterium winners for 1960–1990, stage race winners for 1991–2010, and day winners for 2013–2019.

=== Women ===
- 1977 – Connie Carpenter Boulder, CO
- 1978 – Sue Novara-Reber Flint, MI
- 1979 – Mary Jane Reoch Philadelphia, PA
- 1980 – Beth Heiden Madison, WI
- 1981 – Carol Varnier Montreal, Canada
- 1982 – Pam Deem Pomona, CA
- 1983 – Betsy Davis Elizabeth, NJ
- 1984 – Liz Larsen Exeter, NH
- 1985 – Jeanne Golay Gainesville, FL
- 1986 – Barbara Gradley Westwood, NJ
- 1987 – Beth Mills Plymouth, MA
- 1988 – Jessica Grieco Emerson, NJ
- 1989 – Lucy Tyler Largo, NJ
- 1990 – Susan Elias Readfield, ME
- 1991 – Stephanie Roussos Amherst, MA
- 1992 – Karen Mackin Troy, NY
- 1993 – Rebecca Twigg Flagstaff, AZ
- 1994 – Jacqui Nelson Wellington, New Zealand
- 1995 – Kathy Watt Australia
- 1996 – Lynn Nixon Australia
- 1997 – Giana Roberge Saratoga Springs, NY
- 1998 – Dede (Demet) Barry Boulder, CO
- 1999 – Lyne Bessette Quebec, Canada
- 2000 – Lyne Bessette (2) Quebec, Canada
- 2001 – Lyne Bessette (3) Quebec, Canada
- 2002 – Lyne Bessette (4) Quebec, Canada
- 2003 – Katie Mactier Australia
- 2004 – Sue Palmer-Komar Ontario, CAN
- 2005 – Sue Palmer-Komar (2) Ontario CAN
- 2006 – Sarah Ulmer New Zealand
- 2007 – Genevieve Gauthier Montreal, CAN
- 2008 – Catherine Cheatley New Zealand
- 2009 – Evelyn Stevens United States
- 2010 – Catherine Cheatley New Zealand
- 2013 – Amy Miner (Leominster) United States
- 2013 – Ellen Noble (Fitchburg) United States
- 2013 – Amy Miner (Omnium) United States
- 2014 – Amy Cutler (Leominster) United States
- 2014 – Amy Cutler (Worcester) United States
- 2014 – Amy Cutler (Fitchburg) United States
- 2014 – Amy Cutler (Omnium) United States
- 2015 – Laura Summers (Leominster) United States
- 2015 – Emily Underwood (Worcester) United States
- 2015 – Emily Underwood (Fitchburg) United States
- 2015 – Leslie Timm (Omnium) United States
- 2016 – Ellen Noble (Leominster) United States
- 2016 – Ellen Noble (Worcester) United States
- 2016 – Amy Cutler (Fitchburg) United States
- 2016 – Ellen Noble (Omnium) United States
- 2017 – Regina Legge (Leominster) United States
- 2017 – Colleen Gulick (Fitchburg) United States
- 2018 – Ellen Noble (Leominster) United States
- 2018 – Ellen Noble (Fitchburg) United States
- 2019 – Emma White (Fitchburg) United States

=== Men ===
- 1960 – Guy Morin Canada
- 1961 – Arnie Uhrlass United States
- 1962 – Richard Centore United States
- 1963 – Rob Parsons United States
- 1964 – Paul Ziak United States
- 1965 – Franco Poutenzieri United States
- 1966 – Sam Watson Ireland
- 1967 – Giuseppe Marinoni Canada
- 1968 – Robert Simpson United States
- 1969 – Jocelyn Lovell Canada
- 1970 – Doug Dale United States
- 1971 – Bobby Phillips United States
- 1972 – Giuseppe Marinoni (2) Canada
- 1973 – Steve Woznick United States
- 1974 – Bill Shook United States
- 1975 – Wayne Stetina United States
- 1976 – Tom Doughty United States
- 1977 – Wayne Stetina (2) United States
- 1978 – Wayne Stetina (3) United States
- 1979 – Tom Schuler United States
- 1980 – Bruce Donaghy United States
- 1981 – Steve Pyle United States
- 1982 – Alan McCormack Ireland
- 1983 – Louis Garneau Canada
- 1984 – Russ Williams United Kingdom
- 1985 – Jeff Slack United States
- 1986 – Patrick Liu United States
- 1987 – Roberto Gaggioli Italy
- 1988 – Graeme Miller New Zealand
- 1989 – Jeff Slack (2) United States
- 1990 – Tom Post Netherlands
- 1991 – Davis Phinney United States
- 1992 – Lance Armstrong United States
- 1993 – Davis Phinney (2) United States
- 1994 – Frank McCormack United States
- 1995 – Mike Engleman United States
- 1996 – Tyler Hamilton United States
- 1997 – John Peters United States
- 1998 – Frank McCormack (2) United States
- 1999 – Bart Bowen United States
- 2000 – Henk Vogels Australia
- 2001 – Eric Wohlberg Canada
- 2002 – Chris Horner United States
- 2003 – Viktor Rapinski Belarus
- 2004 – Mark McCormack United States
- 2005 – Jonathan Page United States
- 2006 – Shawn Milne United States
- 2007 – Jake Rytlewski United States
- 2008 – Kyle Wamsley United States
- 2009 – Zachary Bell Canada
- 2010 – David Veilleux Canada
- 2013 – Allan Rego (Leominster) United States
- 2013 – Peter Goguen (Fitchburg) United States
- 2013 – Bobby Bailey (Omnium) United States
- 2014 – Cole Archambault (Leominster) United States
- 2014 – Isaac Howe (Worcester) United States
- 2014 – Isaac Howe (Fitchburg) United States
- 2014 – Cole Archambault (Omnium) United States
- 2015 – Sam Rosenholtz (Leominster) United States
- 2015 – Marloe Rodman (Worcester) United States
- 2015 – Kai Wiggins (Fitchburg) United States
- 2015 – Kai Wiggins (Omnium) United States
- 2016 – Curtis White (Leominster) United States
- 2016 – Bobby Bailey (Worcester) United States
- 2016 – Charles Huff (Fitchburg) United States
- 2016 – Curtis White (Omnium) United States
- 2017 – J. C. Brookshire (Leominster) United States
- 2017 – Joshua Anderson (Fitchburg) United States
- 2018 – Ryan Dewald (Leominster) United States
- 2018 – Curtis White (Fitchburg) United States
- 2019 – Curtis White (Fitchburg) United States
