= Ian MacGregor (cyclist) =

American cyclist (born 1983)

Personal information
- Full name: Ian D. MacGregor
- Born: April 13, 1983 (age 43) Nederland, Colorado, United States

Cycling career
- Sport: Cycling
- Discipline: Road
- Role: Rider

Professional teams
- 2005–2007: TIAA–CREF
- 2008–2009: Team Type 1
- 2010: Kelly Benefit Strategies

Ian D. MacGregor (born April 13, 1983) is an American professional road racing cyclist. MacGregor last rode for UCI Continental team Kelly Benefit Strategies and is the former US Under 23 National Road Champion. In 2006 he founded the Just Go Harder Foundation with fellow professional cyclist Timmy Duggan (Garmin-Transitions).

== Biography ==
MacGregor was born in Nederland, Colorado. He skied competitively in high school and began cycling to maintain conditioning during the off season. After high school, he began cycling professionally.

MacGregor previously rode for TIAA–CREF (2005–2007) and Team Type 1 (2008–2009).

== Just Go Harder Foundation ==
In 2006 Duggan and Ian MacGregor founded the Just Go Harder Foundation to create scholarships for children who would not be able to afford the opportunity to be part of skiing and cycling clubs.

== Major victories ==
2004
1st National under-23 road race championships
2005
1st National under-23 road race championships
2007
1st Stage 5 Tour de Beauce
2008
1st Stage 2 Fitchburg Longsjo Classic
