= Jeff Bradley =

Jeff Bradley may refer to:

- Dudley Dudley (wrestler) (Jeff Bradley, born 1968), American wrestler
- Jeff Bradley (cyclist) (born 1961), American racing cyclist
- Jeff Bradley (politician) (born 1957), American politician and a member of the South Carolina House of Representatives
