= Michael Creed (cyclist) =

American bicycle racer (born 1981)

Personal information
- Born: January 8, 1981 (age 45) Twin Falls, Idaho

Cycling career
- Sport: Cycling
- Current team: EF Education–Aevolo
- Disciplines: Road, track
- Role: Rider, directeur sportif, coach
- Rider type: Climber, Domestique

Professional teams
- 2000: 7 UP–Colorado Cyclist
- 2001–2003: Prime Alliance
- 2004–2005: U.S. Postal Service
- 2006–2007: TIAA–CREF
- 2008: Rock Racing
- 2009–2010: Team Type 1
- 2011–2013: Kelly Benefit Strategies–OptumHealth

Managerial teams
- 2014–2015: Team SmartStop
- 2015–2016: USA Paralympics
- 2017–: Aevolo

Major wins
- United States National Time Trial Championships U23

Michael Creed (born January 8, 1981) is a former American cyclist and U23 time trial national champion. He was the sports director of Team SmartStop in the 2014 and 2015 seasons before being appointed head coach of USA Paralympics' paracycling programme in November 2015. He became director of the new American UCI Continental U23 development team Aevolo for 2017.

== Major results ==
2000
Under–23 National Road Championships

2nd Time trial
2nd Road race

2001
3rd Overall Ronde de l'Isard

1st Stage 5

2nd Overall Tour of the Gila
2002
3rd Overall Ronde de l'Isard
2003
Under–23 National Time Trial Championships
1st Stage 3 Sea Otter Classic
2004
1st Overall Cascade Cycling Classic

1st Stage 2

2010
2nd Mount Hood Cycling Classic
10th Overall Tour du Maroc
