= Colby Simmons =

American cyclist

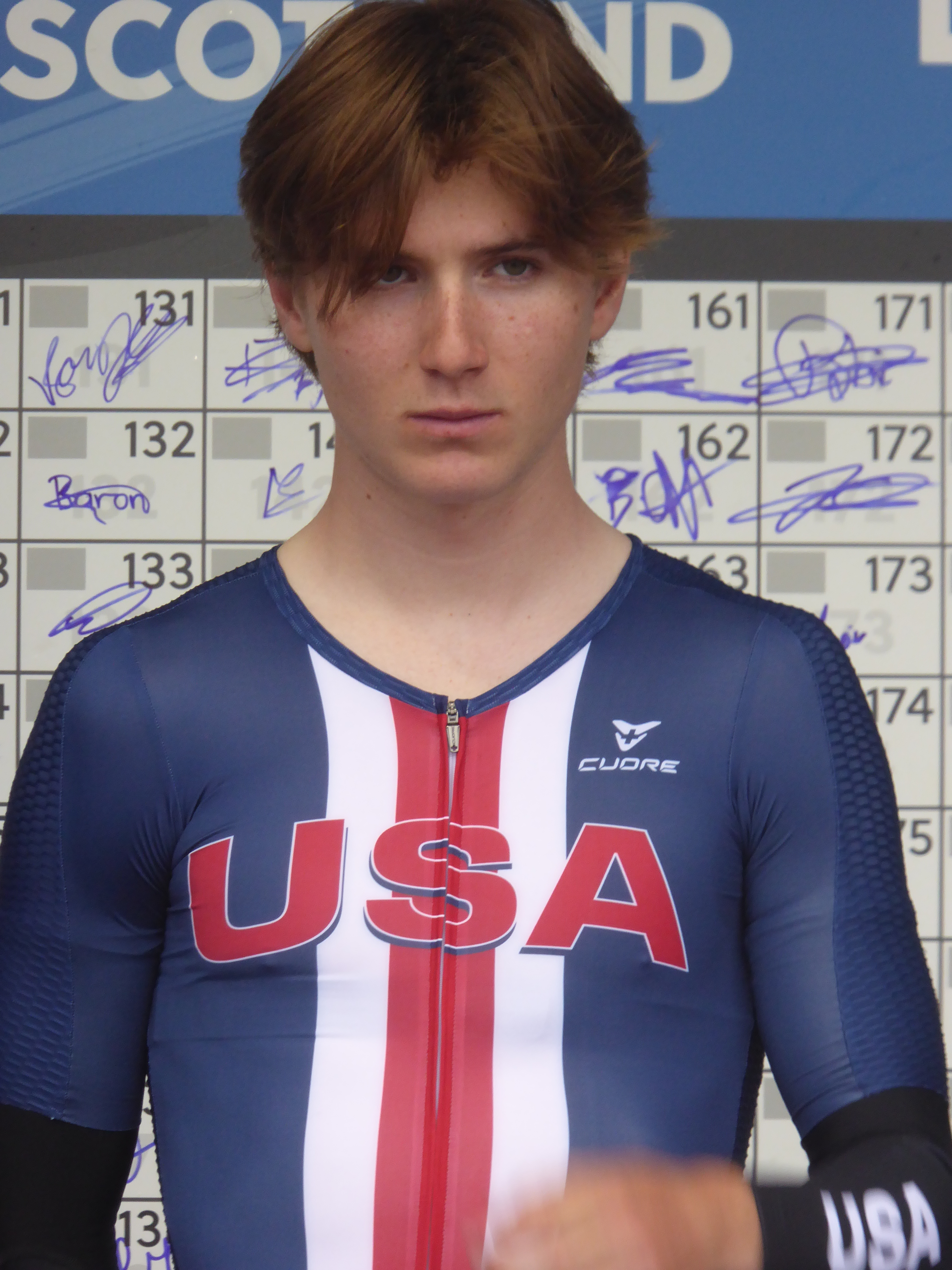
- Simmons in 2023

Personal information
- Born: October 16, 2003 (age 23) Durango, Colorado
- Height: 185 cm (6 ft 1 in)
- Weight: 68 kg (150 lb)

Cycling career
- Sport: Cycling
- Current team: EF Education–EasyPost
- Discipline: Road
- Role: Rider

Amateur team
- 2020–2021: Lux–Sideshow

Professional teams
- 2022–2024: Jumbo–Visma Development Team
- 2025: EF Education–Aevolo
- 2025–: EF Education–EasyPost

Colby Simmons (born 16 October 2003) is an American road cyclist who rides for UCI WorldTeam EF Education–EasyPost.

== Early and personal life ==
His father Scott Simmons owns a construction business, and his mother is Holly Simmons. His older brother Quinn Simmons is also a cyclist. They grew up around the San Juan Mountains of southwestern Colorado. The family would go skiing in the winter and ride mountain bikes in the summer, and vacation in the mountains near Moab, Utah.

== Career ==
Simmons won his first national age-group title at the USA Cycling Amateur Road National Championships junior men’s age 15-16 criterium race in downtown Hagerstown, Maryland in June 2019. He won the junior 17-18 road race at the USA Cycling Amateur Road National Championships in Florida in 2021. Simmons signed for the Jumbo–Visma Development Team in September 2021. He represented Team USA in the Junior Men's Road Race at 2021 UCI Road World Championships.

In April 2023, he had a top-20 finish in the Volta Limburg Classic. Simmons finished second to Owen Cole in the U23 national road race at the USA Cycling Amateur Road Nationals in Roanoke, Virginia in June 2023. That month he also finished as runner-up at the United States National Criterium Championships in Knoxville, behind three-time winner Luke Lamperti.

He was selected for the 2023 UCI Road World Championships held in Glasgow, in August 2023.

In 2025, he switched teams to EF Education–Aevolo, before being promoted to EF Education–EasyPost at the end of March. His first UCI WorldTour race was the Tour of Flanders.

== Major results ==
2021
1st Road race, National Junior Road Championships
1st Overall Davy Crockett Classic

1st Stages 1 & 3

2nd Trofee van Vlaanderen
3rd Overall Grand Prix Rüebliland

1st Stage 3

7th Grand Prix Bob Jungels
9th Overall Ain Bugey Valromey Tour
2022
5th Road race, National Under-23 Road Championships
9th Gran Premio Sportivi di Poggiana
10th Overall Flanders Tomorrow Tour
10th Poreč Trophy
2023
1st Young rider classification, Okolo Slovenska
1st Points classification, Tour Alsace
2nd National Criterium Championships
2nd Road race, National Under-23 Road Championships
5th Omloop der Kempen
6th Overall Tour de Bretagne
9th Paris–Roubaix Espoirs
9th Youngster Coast Challenge
2024
2nd Overall Tour Alsace

1st Young rider classification

2nd Big Sugar Gravel
3rd National Gravel Championships
3rd Road race, National Under-23 Road Championships
2025
3rd National Criterium Championships
3rd Overall Tour of Rhodes
7th Overall Visit South Aegean Islands
