= Serotta =

American bicycle manufacturer

Serotta Competition Bicycles
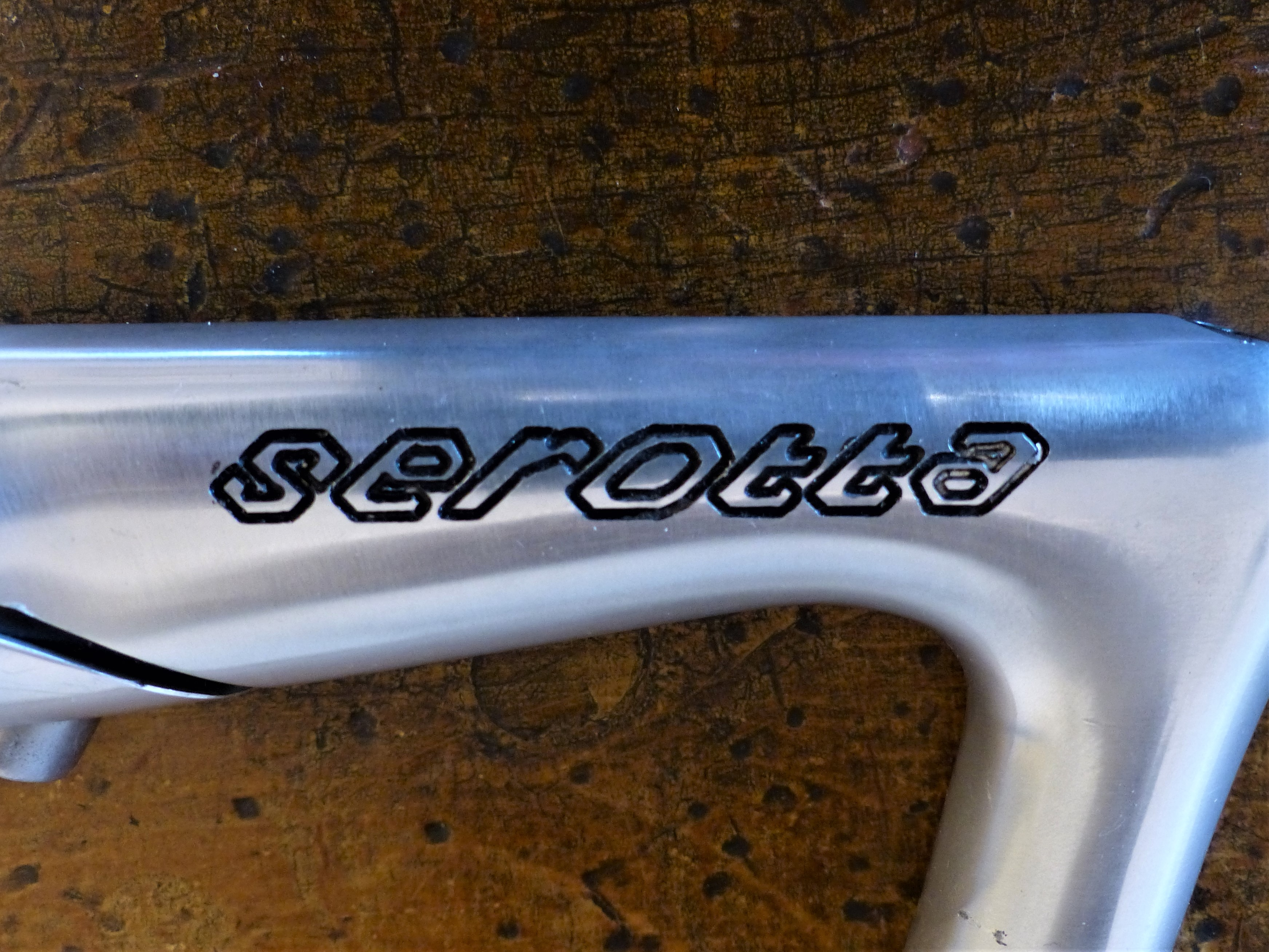
- Industry: Bicycles
- Founded: 1972; 54 years ago
- Defunct: 2013; 13 years ago
- Fate: Relaunched
- Headquarters: Saratoga Springs, New York
- Key people: Ben Serotta, Kelly Bedford, David Kirk, Keith Cieslinski
- Products: Road, Track, Mountain, Gravel, and Cyclocross Bicycles

Serotta is an American bicycle builder located in Saratoga Springs, New York. Named after founder Ben Serotta, the company was founded in 1972.

Serotta built frames for the Coors, Crest and 7-Eleven pro teams, although Team 7-Eleven bikes were branded as Murray and later Huffy. Serotta also built bikes for the 1984 Los Angeles Olympic Games. Serotta was known in the industry for its proprietary tube designs and revolutionary titanium bicycle building. Serotta sold the company in 1989 to Archibald Cox Jr., son of Watergate special prosecutor Archibald Cox. Cox later purchased Fat City Cycles and merged it with Serotta in response to growing interest in mountain biking. In 1997, Ben Serotta and his wife Marcie bought the company back from Cox.

Serotta also has a bicycle-fitting system. The Serotta Fit School, started in 1998, trains retailers, coaches and clinicians in a system that incorporates the rider's life, goals, fitness, body, flexibility, motion, experience, injuries, surgeries and physical concerns. In the past, a fitting system that included a Size Cycle with quick release levers on all adjustable parts of a bicycle frame. The customer would come prepared for a cycling workout. As the cyclist pedaled, the fitter would measure and adjust the frame, based on the factors listed above. When the workout was over, the frame measurements were taken and the bicycle was custom-ordered for the cyclist. Today, Serotta runs the Serotta International Cycle Institute where his staff teaches bicycle fit concepts that are now significantly more advanced than the days of the Size Cycle.

In June 2013, Serotta merged with Blue Competition Cycles and Mad Fiber Wheels under the name of Divine Cycling Group. In July 2013, Serotta ceased manufacturing bicycles, but Ben Serotta resumed sales of own-brand bicycles in 2017 and launched a direct-to-consumer business in 2020.

== History ==
=== 2015 ===
Ben Serotta helped redesign the Citi Bike for New York City's bike sharing system.

=== 2017 ===
Ben Serotta returned to selling bicycles under the name of Serotta Design Studio.

=== 2020 ===
Ben Serotta announced the return of Serotta branded bicycles. The new Serotta re-launch is built upon on a direct-to-consumer strategy, as opposed to its former small network of bicycle shops throughout the country. Serotta's focus on fit and custom-built frames is still at the core of what the company is built upon.

Available bicycles include Duetti for road cycling, Modomio for pavement, dirt, and gravel, and Scappero, mainly for dirt, gravel, and trail. Serotta plans to launch a new offering to their line every six months and Ben Serotta has said that this plan will inevitably include an e-bike.
