= Death of Celine Cremer =

2023 disappearance of Belgian hiker in Australia

- Disappeared: 17 June 2023 (aged 31); Waratah, Tasmania, Australia
- Body discovered: 28 January – 8 February 2026

Céline Cremer (13 June 1992 – c. June 2023) was a Belgian hiker who went missing while bushwalking near Philosopher Falls, near Waratah in north-west Tasmania, Australia, in June 2023. Her vehicle was found at the Philosopher Falls trailhead, but extensive searches failed to locate her. In December 2025, a private search effort involving Cremer's family and volunteers, including YouTuber Rob Parsons, located her mobile phone and other items believed to be connected to her. In January 2026, a volunteer searcher found human remains near Philosopher Falls, prompting further searches by Tasmania Police. Additional remains and Cremer's car key were subsequently found in the Arthur River. On 27 February 2026, Tasmania Police announced that expert forensic reports had provided compelling evidence that the remains were likely those of Cremer. A coroner later confirmed the remains found did belong to Cremer.

== Background and disappearance ==
Cremer had been living in Tasmania for six months, intending to relocate to Victoria the same week she disappeared. She was last seen on 17 June 2023, in Waratah, Tasmania. The initial search for her ended on 10 July 2023, after experts determined she could not have survived the inclement weather. Her white Honda CR-V was found near a trailhead at Philosopher Falls, a densely forested area around a river, on 27 June, and determined to have been there since at least 20 June. After the search was initially called off, one of Cremer's friends flew in from Belgium and joined the police with a cadaver dog for an additional search. The search was again suspended when the dog picked up no trace of Cremer. The search was extensive, involving professional search and rescue teams, drones, and helicopters.

== Private search party ==
Over the subsequent 18 months, Cremer's family organized a private search party. A YouTube filmmaker and amateur wilderness prospector, Rob Parsons, became interested in the case in 2024, and began conducting his own searches for her remains. After obtaining Cremer's cell phone data from the family's private investigator, Ken Gamble, he posted a video about Cremer's case and his plans to search for her on YouTube, which amassed nearly a million views. The video included an analysis of the data. The video spurred interest from the public to assist in the search for Cremer's remains. Parsons worked with Cremer's family to organize a large search to take place over several days of December 2025.

Parsons centered his searches around retracing her possible steps based on her cell phone data, which led him to the belief that she had dropped her phone at its last GPS point while attempting to find a direct route back to her car off trail. Her phone was discovered during the December search less than 100 metres (330 ft) from its final data point. In the days following the discovery of her cell phone, a poncho made from a black trash bag and a glass water bottle were discovered 300 metres (980 ft) away from the phone on a route back toward her vehicle. The water bottle was a brand sold by the restaurant she worked at, and the expiration date made the period it had been sold likely the week Cremer disappeared. Searches were paused while they waited for forensic testing of the items. However, some volunteers, including Parsons, continued searching on their own. Parsons focused on an area around a pair of footprints along the bank of the river that had been found during a 2023 search, originally disregarded due to their remote location.

On 28 January 2026, a bushwalker discovered human remains believed to be that of Cremer. Jarrod Boys, who discovered the remains, was one of the volunteer search members that had continued the search. The police said there were no other reports of missing people in the area. On 8 February 2026, Tasmania Police found Cremer's car keys and more bones in the Arthur River. On 27 February 2026, the remains were provisionally identified as Cremer. Tasmania Police Commander Nathan Johnston said that experts had provided "compelling evidence" that the remains were that of Cremer, expressed condolences to her family and friends, and thanked volunteer searchers for their efforts.

== Coronial findings ==
In August 2026, the coroner ruled out the involvement of another person in Cremer's death, finding that she died accidentally after becoming lost. The coroner also found that a poncho and water bottle discovered during the search contained male DNA and did not establish that Cremer had sheltered at the location in June 2023.

== See also ==
- List of solved missing person cases (2020s)
