= Chris Baldwin (cyclist) =

American professional cyclist

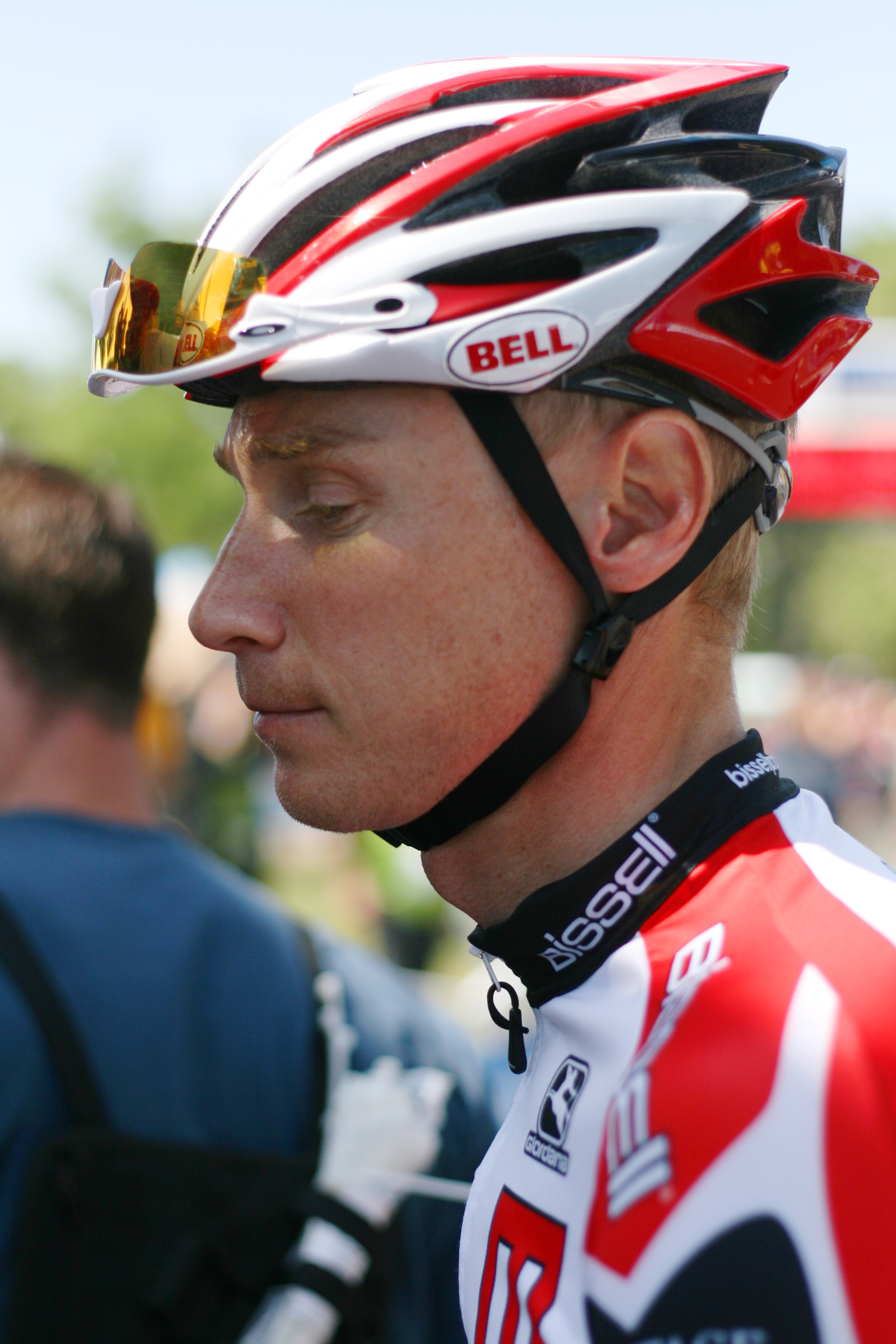
- Baldwin at the 2012 Tour of California

Personal information
- Full name: Christoper Baldwin
- Born: October 15, 1975 (age 51)
- Height: 6 ft 1 in (1.85 m)
- Weight: 150 lb (68 kg)

Cycling career
- Sport: Cycling
- Discipline: Road
- Role: Rider

Professional teams
- 2000–2005: Navigators
- 2006–2008: Toyota–United
- 2009–2010: UnitedHealthcare
- 2011–2013: Bissell

Major wins
- One-day races and Classics National Time Trial Championships (2003, 2005)
Medal record
Representing United States
Men's road cycling
Pan American Games
Silver medal – second place	2003 Santo Domingo	Road Time Trial

Chris Baldwin (born October 15, 1975) is an American former professional cyclist.

He has won the United States National Time Trial Championships on two occasions, in 2003 and 2005. After retiring Baldwin became a cycling coach for TrainingPeaks.

== Major results ==
1999
1st Stage 10 Vuelta a Guatemala
2001
7th GP Stad Vilvoorde
8th Overall Tour de Beauce
2002
3rd Time trial, National Road Championships
9th Route Adélie
10th Grand Prix Pino Cerami
2003
1st Time trial, National Road Championships
2nd Overall Tour de Beauce

1st Stage 5a

2004
4th Time trial, National Road Championships
8th Overall Tour of Qinghai Lake
10th Overall Tour of Britain
2005
1st Time trial, National Road Championships
5th Rund um Köln
2006
1st Overall Tour of the Gila

1st Stage 1

2nd Time trial, National Road Championships
9th Overall Tour de Georgia
2007
2nd Overall Tour of the Gila
2009
3rd Overall Tour of the Gila
2011
7th Overall Tour of the Gila
2012
6th Bucks County Classic
7th Overall Tour of the Gila
