= Kurt Stockton =

American cyclist (born 1965)

Personal information
- Born: October 17, 1965 (age 60) Santa Barbara, California

Cycling career
- Sport: Cycling
- Current team: Retired
- Discipline: Road
- Role: Rider

Kurt Stockton (born October 17, 1965, in Santa Barbara, California) is a former American cyclist.

== Palmares ==
1990
National Road Race Champion
1st International Cycling Classic
3rd Philadelphia International Championship
1991
1st stage 1 Redlands Bicycle Classic
