= Giana Roberge =

American female road cycle racer from (born 1970)

- Giana Roberge in November 2004 with an Independent Fabrication Titanium Crown Jewel bicycle

Personal information
- Full name: Giana Roberge-Goldberg
- Born: December 16, 1970 (age 55) United States

Cycling career
- Sport: Cycling
- Current team: Retired
- Discipline: Road
- Role: Rider
- Rider type: All-rounder

Amateur team
- US National Team

Professional team
- 1996–1999: Timex Women's Team

Major wins
- World Masters Cycling Champion (2004) (United States) US Masters National Cycling Champion (2003)

Giana Roberge (born December 16, 1970, in New Hampshire) is an American female road cycle racer from who, after retiring from professional cycling in 1999 due to a heart condition, began another successful career as a team director, leading the Saturn Women's road team to become one of the most successful teams in the world. In 2003, she returned to cycle racing and has now competed in every major women's one-day and stage race in the world.

On August 5, 2005, Roberge was inducted into the International Cycling Hall of Fame in Utica, New York. Roberge was honoured for both her racing career and her contribution to the sport as the Director of the Saturn Women's Cycling Team and the president and owner of Team Speed Queen.

== Success ==
=== Early racing career (1992-2003) ===
Roberge entered the world of cycling in 1992 when she worked for Paradox Bicycle Center in Saratoga Springs, New York. After two years as manager and purchaser, she bought the shop. As well as owning the shop, she began road and mountain biking, quickly rising to the top of the women's road peloton. In 1996, she turned professional with the Timex Women's Cycling Team, and had some successes. She went on to become a member of the US National Team and raced with Timex until 1999 when a heart condition dcaused her premature retirement.

=== Manager and director sportif ===
Tom Schuler (Team Sports) hired Roberge in August 1999 as the manager of the Timex Team, and in 2000 she was both manager and director sportif of the team. In 2001, she merged the Timex Team with the Saturn Team and became the assistant general manager of the Saturn Team as well as the women's director sportif. She led them to become the #1 Union Cycliste Internationale ranked women's team and ensured back-to-back World Cup series titles, as well as assisting in the qualifying of over 20 Saturn and Timex Team men and women athletes for the 2000 and 2004 Olympics.

=== Return to racing (2003 onwards) ===
In 2003, Roberge was given a clean bill of health and returned to racing when she had time between directing the Saturn Women to the #1 ranking in the US and managing both the men's and women's teams. She won the Master's US National Time Trial Championships and was silver medalist at the Master's World Championships. She was later quoted in interview saying, "I'm really bummed that I got silver at Masters World's last year - I really wanted to get gold."

In 2004, a lifelong ambition to compete in the RAAM was put on hold because of three broken ribs and mononucleosis. Instead, she focused on winning the World Championship title, which she did in August riding an Independent Fabrication XS. Along with racing in 2004, she focused time on her new company, Team Speed Queen and managing the Quark Team. She also led European coaching tours, which included five weeks in Spain and four weeks at the Tour de France.

== Other work ==
- Leads clinics at bike shops and for cycling clubs (mostly but not only for women) and coaching tours.
- Coaches individual athletes (men and women).
- Serves as a spokesperson for women's road racing in the US.
- Works as a cycling industry consultant for products including Louis Garneau, Independent Fabrication, Athlete Octane and Gatorade.
- Race consultant for events including Redlands and Nature Valley.
- Called upon as an expert in the industry in magazines such as Parenting, CA Outdoor, Horizon Air, Bicycling, several newspapers leading into races, as well as within the industry VeloNews and CyclingNews.com.
- Represented cycling as a bike shop owner, a professional cyclist and a spokesperson for the community since 1994.

== Teams and victories ==
2003 - Team Speed Queen
(United States) US National Time Trial Champion

2004 - Team Speed Queen
World Master's Time Trial Champion - UCI Masters Time Trial World Championships
L'Etape du Tour 12th edition (1st overall)
Presque Isle Time Trial (1st place)
Midi Pyrenees Time Trial Championships (1st place)
Lance Armstrong Time Trial (1st place)
First Place Pinole Time Trial, California (1st place)
First Place Pine Cone Road Race, New jersey (1st place)

2007
Northern California/Nevada TT Championships (1st place)
World Master's Time Trial Championship (2nd place)

2008 - Proman/Paradigm
Valley of the Sun Stage Race (1st overall)
