= Fat City Cycles =

American mountain bike company

- Industry: Bicycles
- Founded: 1982
- Defunct: 1999
- Fate: Bought by a Holding Company and Closed
- Successor: Independent Fabrication
- Headquarters: Somerville, Massachusetts
- Key people: Chris Chance
- Products: Mountain, Cyclocross, and Road Bicycles

Fat City Cycles was an American bicycle manufacturing company. Fat City was started by Chris Chance in 1982. Fat City Cycles was one of the early builders of mountain bikes on the East Coast of the United States. When Fat City moved from Somerville, Massachusetts to South Glens Falls, New York, many of the employees left behind went on to start Independent Fabrication.

== History of Fat City Cycles ==
Chris Chance began building frames in 1977. The company was financed, amongst others, by his wife Wendyll's family. Chance built his first mountain bike frame in 1982, The Fat Chance.

Fat City Cycles closed its doors in Somerville in October 1994 when it was sold to a holding company that had acquired another bike company (Serotta) in South Glens Falls, New York. The holding company moved the Fat City equipment to South Glens Falls. Few employees remained with the company after the move.

== Models ==
Below is a list of some of Fat City Cycles' bicycles.

Model	Introduced	Discontinued	Material	Type of bike	Sizes
Fat Chance			Cro-mo steel	Mountain bike	
Fat Chance with 24" Rear Wheel				Mountain bike	
Team Comp				Mountain bike	
Monster Fat	1991	1993	Cro-mo steel	Mountain bike	
Slim Chance			Cro-mo steel	Road bike	
Shock A Billy Full	1994		Cro-mo steel	Full suspension mountain bike	
Yo Eddy	1990	1999	Cro-mo steel	Mountain bike	
Titanium	1993	1999	Titanium	Mountain bike	
Yo Betty			Cro-mo steel	Mountain bike	
Buck Shaver	1994		Cro-mo steel	Mountain bike	
Wicked Fat Chance	1987		Cro-mo steel	Mountain bike	
Fat F*ck'n Chance					
Bro Eddy					
Flaming Sea Cycles	1980				
Random Tandem				Tandem Mountain Bike	
