= David Williams (American cyclist) =

American cyclist

Personal information
- Born: June 19, 1988 (age 38)

Cycling career
- Sport: Cycling
- Current team: Retired
- Discipline: Road
- Role: Rider

Amateur team
- 2019: Bissell ABG

Professional teams
- 2010–2011: Bissell
- 2012: Competitive Cyclist Racing Team
- 2013–2014: 5-hour Energy
- 2015: Jamis–Hagens Berman
- 2016: Astellas

David Williams (born June 19, 1988) is an American former professional racing cyclist. He rode in the men's team time trial at the 2015 UCI Road World Championships. In 2014 and 2015, Williams finished third in the United States National Time Trial Championships.
