= Jim Van Boven =

American cyclist

Jim Van Boven (born August 8, 1949) is a former American cyclist. He competed in the team time trial at the 1968 Summer Olympics.

He received a gold medal as a Junior in the 1967 United States National Road Race Championships, in Portland, Oregon.

== See also ==
- United States National Road Race Championships#Junior
