= Alexey Vermeulen =

American cyclist (born 1994)

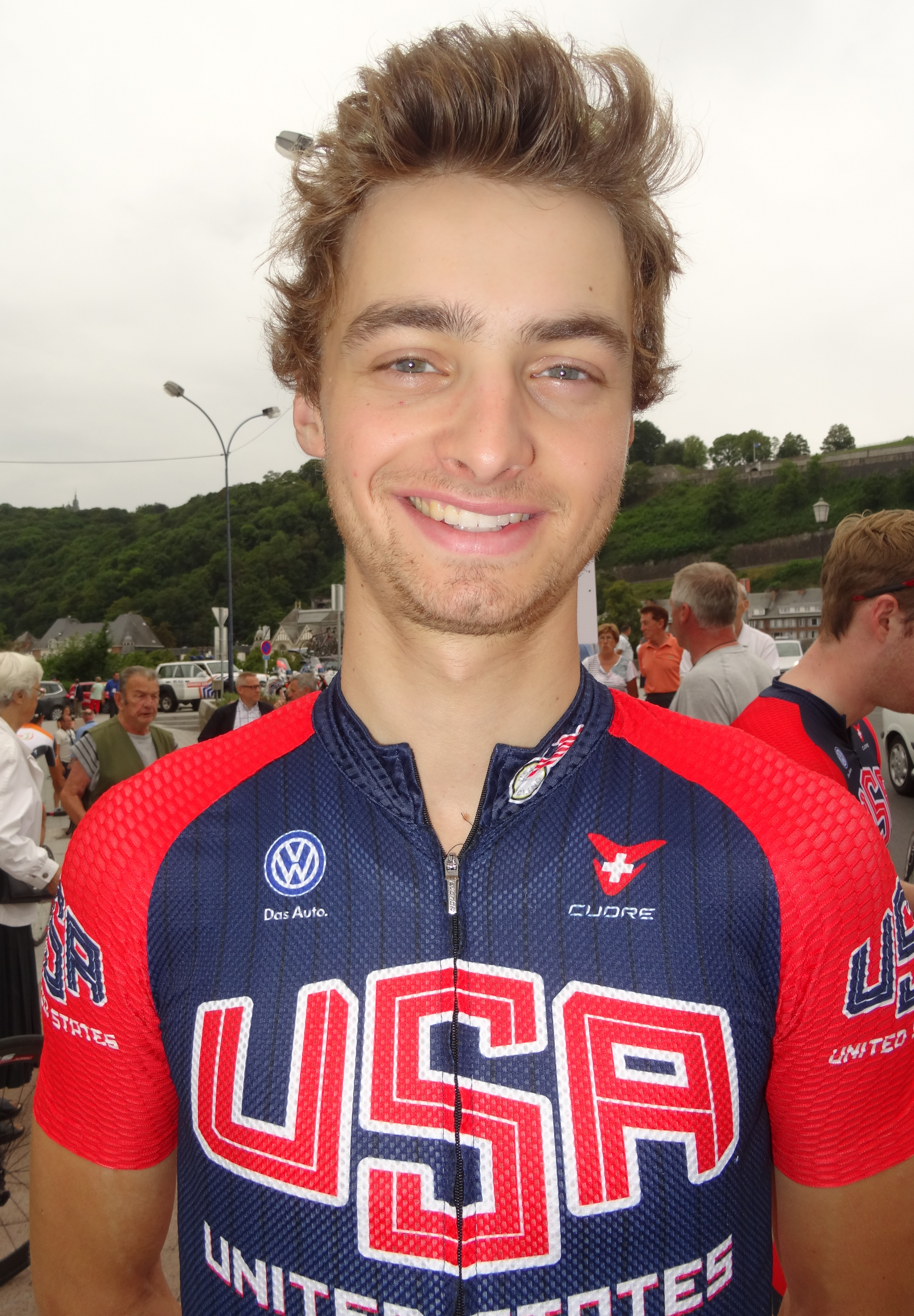
- Vermeulen in 2014.

Personal information
- Full name: Alexey Vermeulen
- Born: December 16, 1994 (age 31) Memphis, Tennessee, United States
- Height: 5 ft 10 in (1.78 m)
- Weight: 146 lb (66 kg)

Cycling career
- Sport: Cycling
- Current team: Jukebox Cycling
- Disciplines: Road; Mountain biking; Gravel
- Role: Rider

Amateur teams
- 2013–2015: BMC Development Team
- 2021: Canyon Bicycles–Shimano
- 2022–: Jukebox Cycling

Professional teams
- 2016–2017: LottoNL–Jumbo
- 2018: Interpro Stradalli

Alexey Vermeulen (born December 16, 1994, in Memphis, Tennessee) is an American cyclist currently competing on the professional mountain bike and gravel circuits. Prior to turning professional in 2016, Vermeulen spent the previous three seasons riding for the BMC Development Team. He now competes for Jukebox Cycling, a multi-discipline team of six riders. In 2026, Vermeulen signed a career-long extension with ENVE Composites, extending a partnership that began in 2021.

Vermeulen has become famous on the circuit for training with Sir Willie the Weiner, a long-haired miniature dachshund that he carries in a backpack. Willie belongs to Vermeulen's girlfriend, Sophie Linn.

In 2022 he won the Belgian Waffle Ride California on this third attempt, beating second place Matthew Beers by over 6 minutes. November 4, 2023 Alexey won the Iceman Cometh in Traverse City Michigan.

== Major results ==
=== Road ===
2011
1st Road race, National Junior Championships
5th Overall Tour de l'Abitibi
10th Overall Regio-Tour Junior
2012
2nd Overall Tour de l'Abitibi
4th Overall 3-Etappen-Rundfahrt
5th Overall Regio-Tour Junior
9th Omloop der Vlaamse Gewesten
2014
6th Overall Course de la Paix U23
2015
National Under-23 Championships

2nd Time trial
4th Road race

7th Overall Ronde de l'Isard
2016
3rd Time trial, National Championships
2017
3rd Road race, National Championships
2018
2nd Overall Tour du Maroc

1st Stage 4

6th Overall Tour de Beauce
10th Overall Tour of Qinghai Lake
2021
4th Road race, National Road Championships
2024
5th Road race, National Road Championships

=== Mountain bike ===
2018
1st Peak2Peak Mountain Bike Race
2nd Bell's Iceman Cometh Challenge
2019
1st Bell's Iceman Cometh Challenge
2022
1st Chequamegon MTB Festival
1st Bell's Iceman Cometh Challenge
2023
2nd Leadville 100
2025
1st Chequamegon MTB Festival

=== Gravel ===
2022
1st Belgian Waffle Ride California
5th Unbound Gravel 200
2023
3rd Big Sugar Gravel
3rd SBT GRVL
3rd Belgian Waffle Ride California
2024
1st Big Sugar Gravel
2nd Belgian Waffle Ride California
2025
2nd Rule of Three
3rd Belgian Waffle Ride California
3rd Sea Otter Classic
3rd SBT GRVL
