= Independent Fabrication =

American bicycle manufacturer

- Type: Private
- Industry: Bicycles
- Founded: 1995; 31 years ago
- Headquarters: Lynn, Massachusetts, U.S.
- Key people: Keith Rouse, Shawn Estes
- Products: Custom Bicycles
- Revenue: undisclosed
- Number of employees: 13
- Website: Independent Fabrication

Independent Fabrication (IF) is a bicycle company located in Lynn, Massachusetts, USA. IF fabricates bicycle frames from steel, titanium and carbon fiber. Independent Fabrication has twice won the Bicycling Magazine "Dream Bike of the Year" with its carbon-tubed, titanium-lugged XS road frame. Independent Fabrication was founded by and is owned by its employees. In 2005, the company took part in a CNN television program called The TurnAround. The show paired a growing business with a mentor from a more successful company. Independent Fabrication was paired with Jeff Swartz, chief executive of Timberland.

In 2011, the company announced that its factory would move from Somerville, Massachusetts, to Newmarket, New Hampshire, within the year. A handful of IF's employees made the move with the company, and several former employees returned.

In 2022 Independent Fabrication was purchased by longtime employee Keith Rouse. He moved the company back to Massachusetts, not far from their Somerville location.

== History of Independent Fabrication ==
Independent Fabrication was formed by former employees of Fat City Cycles and later Merlin Metalworks. Giana Roberge won the 2004 world masters time-trial championship in Austria on an XS.

In 2007 Gary Smith bought 80% of the company, with the employees owning the remaining 20%.

== Bicycle Frames ==
Independent Fabrication currently manufactures the following custom bicycle frame models:

=== Road ===
- Corvid (Carbon)
- XS (Carbon and Titanium)
- Factory Lightweight (Steel)
- Factory Lightweight (Ti/Carbon)
- Crown Jewel (Steel; Steel Special Edition (SE); Steel Special Edition Carbon (SEC); Titanium; and Titanium SEC)
- SSR (Columbus XCR Stainless Steel; SSR SEC)
- Club Racer (Steel or Titanium)

Note SEC features carbon wishbone seat stays.

=== Cyclocross ===
- Corvid Cross (Carbon Fiber)
- Planet Cross (Steel or Titanium)
- SSX (Columbus XCR Stainless Steel)

=== Off Road ===
- Deluxe (Steel or Titanium)
- Beatstick (Steel)

=== Touring ===
- Independence (Steel or Titanium)

=== Specials ===
Independent Fabrication has also produced specials and one-off bikes. Some are show bikes, others have been built to the requirements of customers or other companies:

- BMXS
- XS version of the Planet Cross cyclocross bike.
- Phil Wood Piss Off (which had a limited production run)
- Tungsten Electrode full suspension (prototyped in steel and titanium)
- Various Dual Slalom/4X frames.

== Owners' Club ==
An Independent Fabrication Owners' Club launched in 2004. It has a register of over 1,750 IF bikes.

== Grassroots Racing ==
Independent Fabrication has a small but successful grassroots racing program. Racers past and present include:

- Tiffany Mann
- Maureen Bruno Roy
- Eric Roman
- Darren Ling
- Dave Bradley
- Harlan Price
- Mike Ramponi Sr.

They also sponsored a regional woman’s team called the IF Chicks. The roster included Lauri Webber from NewArk, DE and Kerry Combs from Mass.

== IF Racing ==
IF Racing was formed in February 2008 by team director Jonathan Bruno. The squad is a newly expanded U25 Development program for road racing and pro mountain bike racing. In addition to efforts to promote environmental sustainability and healthy choices, the team will participate in an after-school cycling program for Boston public schools.

- Team Website: https://sites.google.com/site/ifracing/

2010 Team

- Jonathan Bruno
- Evan Cooper
- Robbie King
- John Hanson
- Emerson Oronte
- Matt Buckley
- Vinnie Scalia
- Kevin Wolfson
- Todd Yezefski

== Women's team ==
The team, which started as Merlin/Smartfuel in 1997 and in 2000 picked up sponsorship from Independent Fabrication, is based in New England and rides regional and National Racing Calendar events.

Current Riders:

- Brenda Bahnson
- Pauline Frascone
- Zoe Sheehan
- Michele Smith
- Silke Wunderwald

Former Riders:

- Katrina Davis
- Kirsten Grasshoff
- Katheryn Curi Mattis
- Lisa Maxwell
- Julia Oh
- Heather Peck
- Jessica Phillips
- Kathryn Roszko
- Marianne Stover
- Sarah Uhl
- Aimee Vasse

== Gallery ==
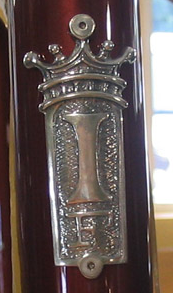
A sterling silver IF head badge on a Ruby Red Club Racer frame

A Ti Crown Jewel

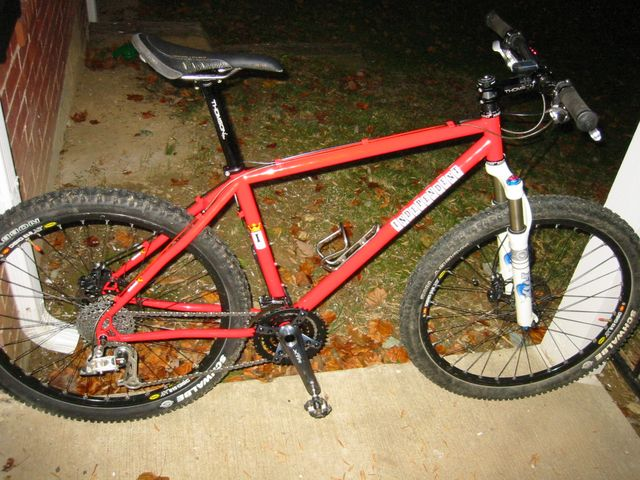
A Steel Deluxe

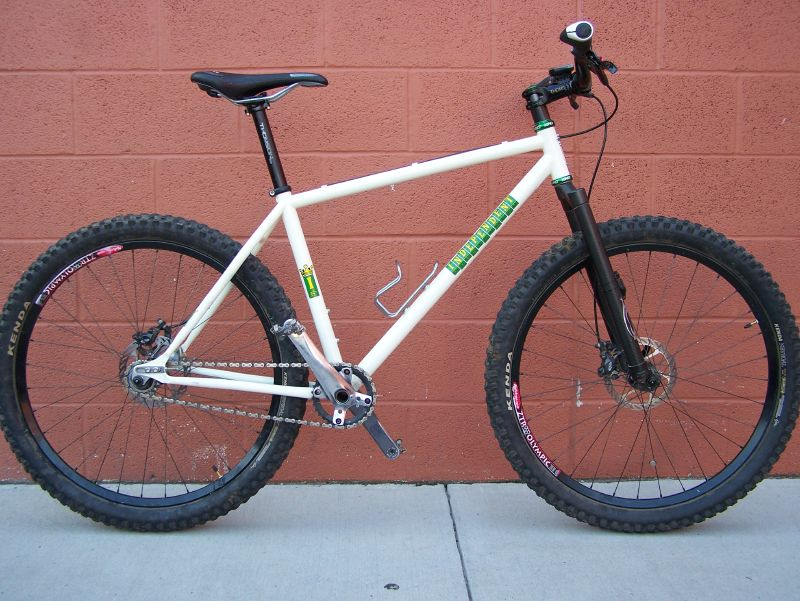
Steel Deluxe Singlespeed

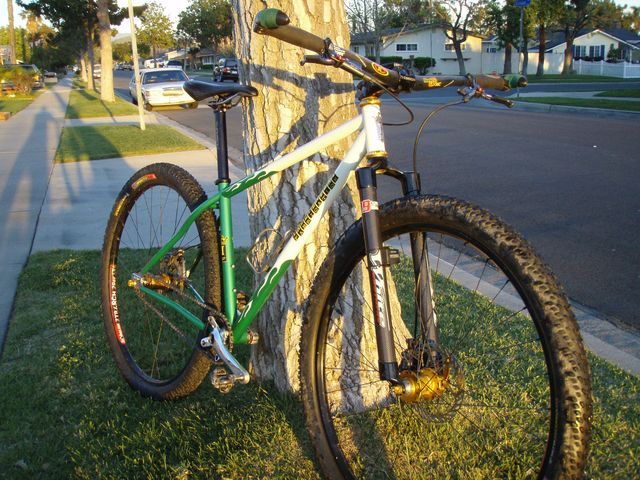
Steel Deluxe 29er Singlespeed
