= Szczecina =

Szczecina is a Polish surname. Notable people with the surname include:

- Kamila Szczecina (born 1987), Polish handball player
- Krzysztof Szczecina (born 1990), Polish handball player

== See also ==
- Stetina, a Czech/Slovak cognate
