= Thomas Prehn =

American cyclist (born 1961)

Personal information
- Born: April 1, 1961 (age 65) United States

Cycling career
- Sport: Cycling
- Current team: Retired
- Discipline: Road
- Role: Rider

Professional teams
- 1985-1987: Schwinn
- 1988: F.E.I. Velo

Major wins
- United States National Road Race Championships (1986)

Thomas Prehn (born April 1, 1961) is a retired American cyclist.

== Palmares ==
1980
1st stage 11b Vuelta Ciclista de Chile
1986
National Road Race Champion
1987
1st Quad Cities

Author of book; Racing Tactics for Cyclists(2004)
