= Janelle Parks =

American cyclist

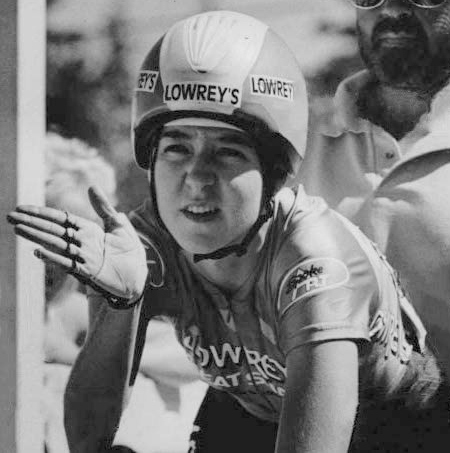
- Parks in 1988

Personal information
- Born: August 1, 1962 (age 64) Kettering, Ohio, U.S.
- Height: 162 cm (5 ft 4 in)
- Weight: 57 kg (126 lb)

Cycling career
- Sport: Cycling
Medal record
Representing United States
UCI Road World Championships
Silver medal – second place	1986 Colorado Springs	Road race

Janelle Louise Parks (born August 1, 1962) is a retired American cyclist. Competing in the individual road race she won a silver medal at the 1986 World Championships and finished tenth at the 1984 Olympics. Parks won the national title in this event in 1987, placing second in 1983 and 1988. In 1985 she won the Tour de l'Aude Cycliste Féminin and placed 7th overall as top American finisher in the Tour de France Féminin 1985. Parks later married, becoming Janelle Parks-Graham, and settled in Western Australia as a cycling coach.
