= Amy Cutler =

American painter

- Born: 1974 (age 51–52); Poughkeepsie, New York
- Education: Cooper Union School of Art
- Known for: Drawing, painting, printmaking

Amy Cutler (born 1974) is an American contemporary artist. Cutler received her BFA degree from The Cooper Union School of Art, New York, New York, in 1997. Her work has been featured in major surveys of contemporary art, most importantly the 2004 Whitney Biennial.

== Inspirations ==
The characters in Cutler's prints and paintings will often be wearing elaborately patterned clothing. Cutler utilizes culturally-inspired patterns from women's clothing from around the world. She draws inspiration from sources as varied as U.S. military survival manuals, nature books, Japanese woodblock prints, Persian miniatures, and Indonesian designs. She admits that she isn't necessarily “true to the source” as she picks and chooses elements from the source material, while also expanding on it. Ceremonial textiles based on Indian and Chinese designs are worn by some of the characters Cutler has created. The artist has stated that some of her work is inspired by her rejection of traditional gender roles in her 30s, when she chose to buy her own house instead of getting married and having children. Motherhood, though an inspiration for several of her works, is shown from a third-party perspective as the artist is now a mother. She has said of her art involving motherhood that “You ignore the woman...the woman is the life support".

== Themes ==
Passage (2001), The Phillips Collection, Washington, D.C.

Cutler's drawings, paintings, and prints often focus on groups of women, dressed in Victorian style clothing, doing familiar "women's work". Using this, she creates strange narratives that play off of known fairy tales and archetypes. Her women characters are frequently paired in scenes with household items, wild animals and hybrid creatures. Despite her figures' childlike appearances they exhibit darker themes such as poverty, social injustice and violence.

== Style ==
Cutler's style is characterized by intricate and linear figurative drawings, her figured are often depicted with elongated noses teapot heads, and broomstick arms. Cutler's painting work features negative space frequently around her characters, showing her desire to “...get rid of the background”, which she credits for her choice to switch from painting on wood to primarily painting with gouache on paper.

== Exhibitions ==
Cutler has held several solo exhibitions including museum shows at the Art, Design & Architecture Museum, California (2012), the Huntington Museum of Art, West Virginia (2012), the Weatherspoon Art Museum, North Carolina (2010), the Bowdoin College Museum of Art, Maine (2008), the Museo Nacional Centro de Arte Reina Sofía in Madrid (2007), the Indianapolis Museum of Art, Indiana (2006), Institute of Contemporary Art in Philadelphia, Kemper Museum of Contemporary Art, and the Walker Art Center in Minneapolis (2002).

== Public collections and publications ==
Cutler's work is in the collections of many museums and institutions including MOMA, New York, the Indianapolis Museum of Art, New York Public Library, New York, The Metropolitan Museum of Art, New York, The New Museum of Contemporary Art, New York, The Whitney Museum of American Art, New York, and the Smithsonian American Art Museum, Washington, D.C.
