= Wayne Stetina =

American cyclist

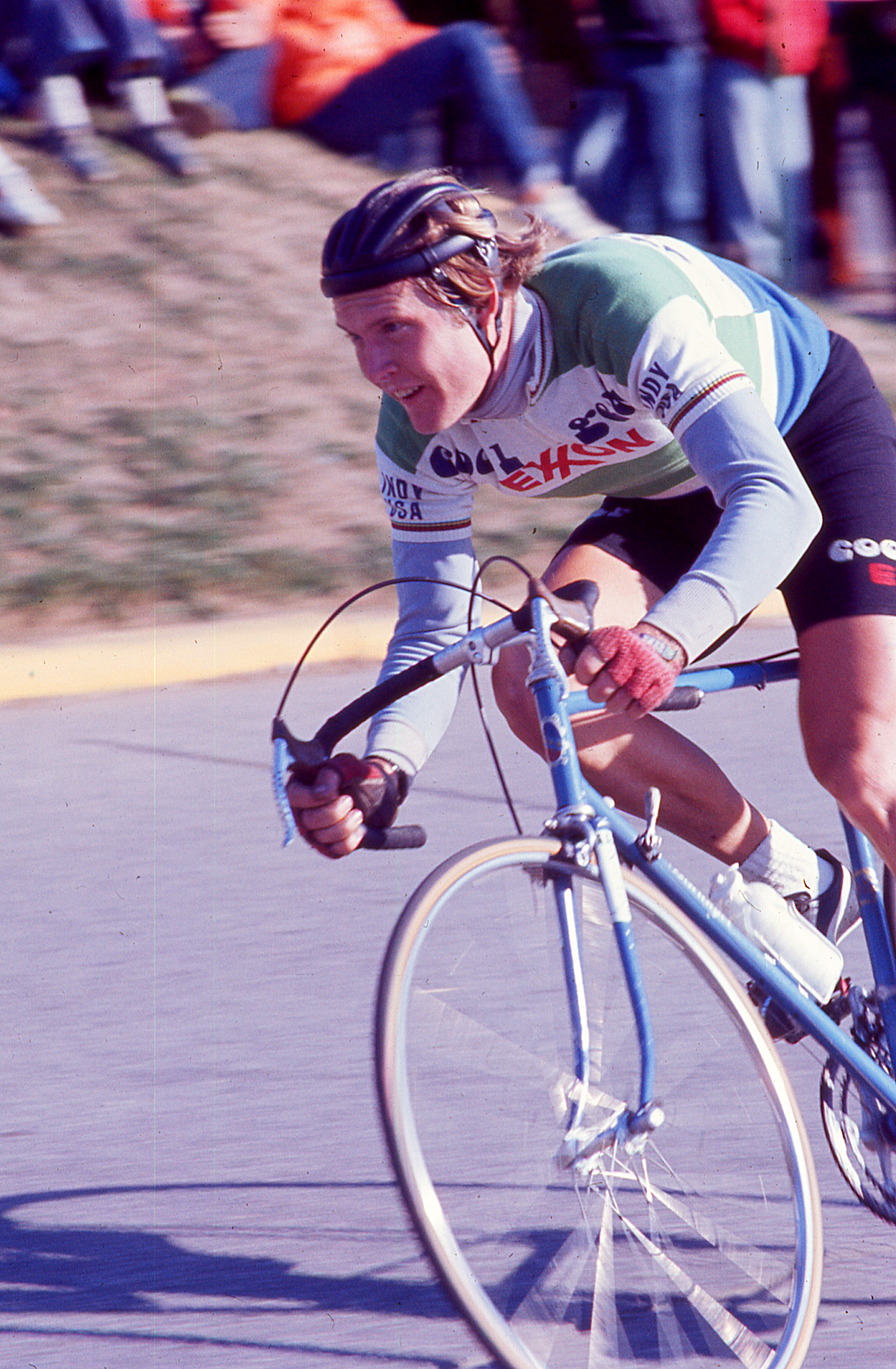
- Wayne Stetina of Indianapolis, Indiana competing in a bicycle road race on the campus of Indiana University in Bloomington, Indiana in October 1976.

Personal information
- Born: December 4, 1953 (age 72) Cleveland, Ohio, United States

Cycling career
- Sport: Cycling
- Current team: Retired
- Discipline: Road
- Role: Rider
- Rider type: Time-trialist

Wayne Douglas Stetina (born December 4, 1953) is a former American cyclist. He competed at the 1972 Summer Olympics and 1976 Summer Olympics.

== Background ==
He is the brother of Dale, Joel and Troy Stetina and the uncle of Peter Stetina. His younger brother Troy who competed in the sport and was an event winner on the same day as Wayne is an internationally known musician and guitar teacher.

== Major results ==
1972
2nd Road race, National Amateur Road Championships
1975
1st Time trial, National Road Championships
1st Overall Fitchburg Longsjo Classic
1st Tour of Kansas City
1976
1st Road race, National Amateur Road Championships
1st Tour of Kansas City
1977
1st Road race, National Amateur Road Championships
1st Overall Coors Classic
1st Overall Fitchburg Longsjo Classic
1978
1st Overall Fitchburg Longsjo Classic
2nd Cat's Hill Classic
3rd Overall Coors Classic
1979
3rd Overall Coors Classic
1980
1st Time trial, National Road Championships
2nd Road race, National Amateur Road Championships
1981
1st Tour of Somerville
3rd Overall Nevada City Classic
1985
1st Road race, National Amateur Road Championships
1986
1st Manhattan Beach Grand Prix
