= Troy Stetina =

American guitarist and educator

- Born: November 16, 1963 (age 62)
- Genre: Rock
- Occupations: Guitarist, music educator
- Instrument: Guitar

Troy Stetina (born November 16, 1963) is an American guitarist and music educator. He was the director of Rock Guitar Studies at the Wisconsin Conservatory of Music and writer for Guitar One magazine, and now teaches independently. He has more than forty rock and metal instructional methods and has sold over 1 million units. He has authored over 40 guitar methods for Hal Leonard LLC.

== Background and early years ==
Stetina grew up in Indiana, the youngest in a family of Olympic cyclists, including his brothers Wayne, Dale and Joel, and won several national medals as a teenager. According to the Rushville Republican, issue July 9, 1973, at the Indiana Bicycle Road Racing championships, Troy won the two miler race for boys aged 8 & 11. Brother Dale was a winner in the 50 mile race for boys 15 & 17. Also Brother Wayne, aged 19 at the time won the 85 mile men's race.

Stetina's mother, an opera singer, supported his interest in music, and at age 12 she bought him a $60 beginner guitar and little practice amp.

After playing in Private Wave and Wraith, and Titan, Stetina began teaching guitar part-time at a local music store, where he met Hal Leonard editor Will Schmid. This led to his heavy-metal instructional books, including Heavy Metal Rhythm Guitar (1986) and Heavy Metal Lead Guitar (1987).

In 1986, he joined faculty of the Wisconsin Conservatory of Music, later becoming Director of the Rock Guitar department before leaving in the early 1990s to focus on recording. In 1990 he released Speed Mechanics for Lead Guitar, an advanced guitar technique that has become a foundational part of the shred guitar lexicon. He left the Conservatory in 1992.

According to The Journal Times, Stetina is a founding member of the Milwaukee hard rock / alternative band Oversoulss. Teaming up with prog metal drummer Eddie Shapanske, Stetina and Shapanske spent a year working with and auditioning vocalists before teaming up with David Rangel who was previously with the Minneapolis-based band, Mersey Side. They then added bassist Dan Evans. Stetina was also a member of the Milwaukee-based progressive metal band Dimension X, replacing the previous guitarist.

According to the Guitar Instructor website, he is internationally recognized and his book Speed Mechanics, has sold more than 100,000 copies. Stetina was an article contributor for the Guitar One magazine in the 2000s. Via the Urban Milwaukee news site, the Wilson Center for the arts refers to him as an "internationally renowned guitarist and clinician".

Stetina is also a Christian. In an interview with Guitariste Metal, he never thought he'd embrace something like Christianity, but certain things in life made him look deeper. From what he said, he didn't subscribe to all of the doctrine in a traditional sense.

== Career ==
=== 1990s ===
Along with guitarists Dominic Miller and Tony Zemaitis, Stetina was featured in the March 1993 issue of Guitarist magazine.

Collaborating with Charlie Busher, Stetina had the book and CD combination, Speed and Thrash Metal Drum Method released in 1993. It was reviewed in Issue 166 of the Modern Drummer magazine. It received a positive review, beginning with, "It's about time! In the wake of countless rock chart books that assume too much, along comes an instructional book/ CD package that assumes nothing". It catered for those who didn't read music and went from the basics upward. Even though the reviewer said an aspect of it was a bit cursory and misleading, the package was "so valuable" and those who couldn't read music, rockers and non-rockers and those experienced players who play by ear could benefit.

Two videos hosted by Stetina were Beginning Lead Guitar and Beginning Rock Rhythm Guitar were marketed through the Hal Leonard Corp., and were released around 1994, 1995.

=== 2000s ===
In the early 2000s, Stetina launched Music44, an online sheet music company, co-founded with business partner Gary Osbourne. Later, Lampifier Microphone Company was established as a DBA of Music44. The patented microphone design featured a proprietary self-adjusting dynamic control circuit built into the handle of the mic. The Lampifier products won the 2010 Best Audio Product at the Worship Facilities Expo (WFX) in Atlanta GA.

In Guitar School magazine (January 2002 issue) Mark Tremonti of Creed referenced Stetina's Speed Mechanics for Lead Guitar as his favorite practice technique method. Shortly after, Stetina began coaching Tremonti in Orlando, as mentioned in Tremonti's subsequent Guitar School interview in October 2004.

Oversoulss was formed in 2003, which featured multiple vocalists in subsequent demos, including Cory Miller, Dan Lenegar, and David Rangel (MercySide).

Stetina was interviewed by Bobby Tanzilo for the online magazine, OnMilwaukee in 2005. In the interview he talked about his musical background and the new band Oversoulss that he had put together and who had recorded their debut album and were getting ready to tour with the band Alter Bridge.

Stetina's band, Oversoulss, were set to appear at the Brat Stop in Kenosha in May 2015. At the time the line up comprised Stetina on guitar, David Rangel on vocals, Eddie Shapanske on drums, and Dan Evans on bass.

One of Stetina's articles Return of the Shred, Come Together Two Essential Hybrid Scales appeared in the Volume 9, No 2, February 2006 issue of Guitar One magazine. It was about combining scales and having a wider range.

In late 2006, Stetina signed with Anger Management (Chuck Toller, former manager of Mudvayne). Toller brought in Scott Yanke to replace David Rangel as the vocalist for Oversoulss, leading to the band's renaming as Second Soul.

In 2007, the band he was guitarist in Generation X released their album Impilcations of a Genetic Disease.

=== 2010s ===
The Conservatorium van Amsterdam reported on November 3, 2010, Troy Stetina and Mark Tremonti were hosting a guitar clinic on the 7th of that month.

Working with Mark Tremonti, helped create the Sound and the Story DVD, which was published by Fret12 Productions.

Stetina was interviewed by Mohsen Fayyazi for Metal Shock Finland which was published on June 25, 2015. Fayyazi has also interviewed people and musicians such as Markus Grosskopf, and Martin Popoff.

Stetina's interview with Mike Huberty of the long-standing Madison music magazine, Maximum Ink was published in September 2012. He mentioned that he had reached a point in the 1990s where he had given up on bands. He also mentioned is association with Mark Tremonti and his band Second Soul and coming across the lead singer for his band, Scott Yanke.

According to La Scena Musicale, Stetina was booked along with Leo Kottke, Antoine Dufour, Ana Vidovic, and Jonathan Kreisberg to appear at the Wilson Center Guitar Competition & Festival which ran from August 13 to 15, 2015, at the Sharon Lynne Wilson Center for the Arts.

=== 2020s ===
Stetina released a five-song EP titled Through the Hall of Mirrors on major digital platforms in 2022.

In 2024, he released an instructional course Total Picking Control: Expanded Speed Mechanics for Guitar through Hal Leonard, which features 60 sequential song studies with 60 audio backing tracks and over 17 hours of video instruction.

In 2025, he launched the Troy Stetina Music Academy , an online platform offering guitar instruction.

Beyond music, Stetina and his wife Alex run ChaiDirect.com which specializes in chai products.

== Speed Mechanics for Lead Guitar ==
Speed Mechanics for Lead Guitar (ISBN 0-7935-0962-9) is a guitar tutorial book by Stetina first published in 1990. It is split into three sections Mechanics, Rhythm and Creativity. It Includes a rock version of "Flight of the Bumblebee" by Nikolai Rimsky-Korsakov, "Caprice No. 10" by Niccolò Paganini and "Prelude in D" by JS Bach.

== Associated bands ==
- Private Wave
- Wraith
- Titan
- Troy Stetina
- Oversoulss
- Dimension X
- Second Soul
- Troy Stetina
- Bridge to Silence

== Publications and instructional works ==
Stetina has authored and contributed to numerous instructional publications and video courses for guitar and drums. His instructional works include guitar methods, technique books, artist-based instructional material and video courses.

=== Guitar methods ===
- Metal Rhythm Guitar, Vol. 1 (Hal Leonard, ISBN 978-0-7935-0958-4)
- Metal Rhythm Guitar, Vol. 2 (Hal Leonard, ISBN 978-0-7935-0959-1)
- Metal Lead Guitar Primer (Hal Leonard, ISBN 978-0-7935-1097-9)
- Metal Lead Guitar, Vol. 1 (Hal Leonard, ISBN 978-0-7935-0960-7)
- Metal Lead Guitar, Vol. 2 (Hal Leonard, ISBN 978-0-7935-0961-4)
- Speed Mechanics for Lead Guitar (Hal Leonard, ISBN 978-0-7935-0962-1)
- Heavy Metal Guitar Tricks (Hal Leonard, ISBN 978-0-7935-0963-8)
- Total Rock Guitar: A Complete Guide to Learning Rock Guitar (Hal Leonard, ISBN 978-0-7935-8787-2)
- Barre Chords: The Ultimate Method and Reference Guide (Hal Leonard, ISBN 978-0-7935-9787-1)
- The Ultimate Scale Book (Hal Leonard, ISBN 978-0-7935-9788-8)
- Fretboard Mastery (Hal Leonard, ISBN 978-0-7935-9789-5)
- Left-Handed Guitar: The Complete Method (Hal Leonard, ISBN 978-0-6340-3008-6)
- Thrash Guitar Method (Hal Leonard, ISBN 978-1-4234-4410-7)
- Total Picking Control: Expanded Speed Mechanics for Guitar (Hal Leonard, ISBN 978-1-4950-6428-9)

=== Artist instructional works ===
- Deep Purple – Greatest Hits: A Step-by-Step Breakdown of the Guitar Style and Techniques of Ritchie Blackmore (Hal Leonard, ISBN 978-0-6340-2942-4)
- Dream Theater – Signature Licks: A Step-by-Step Breakdown of John Petrucci's Guitar Styles and Techniques (Hal Leonard, ISBN 978-1-4768-8945-0)
- The Very Best of Ozzy Osbourne – 2nd Edition: A Step-by-Step Breakdown of the Styles and Techniques of Randy Rhoads, Jake E. Lee & Zakk Wylde (Hal Leonard, ISBN 978-0-6340-1363-8)
- Best of Rage Against the Machine (Hal Leonard, ISBN 978-0-6340-1469-7)
- Best of Foo Fighters (Hal Leonard, ISBN 978-0-6340-1470-3)
