= Owen Cole =

American cyclist

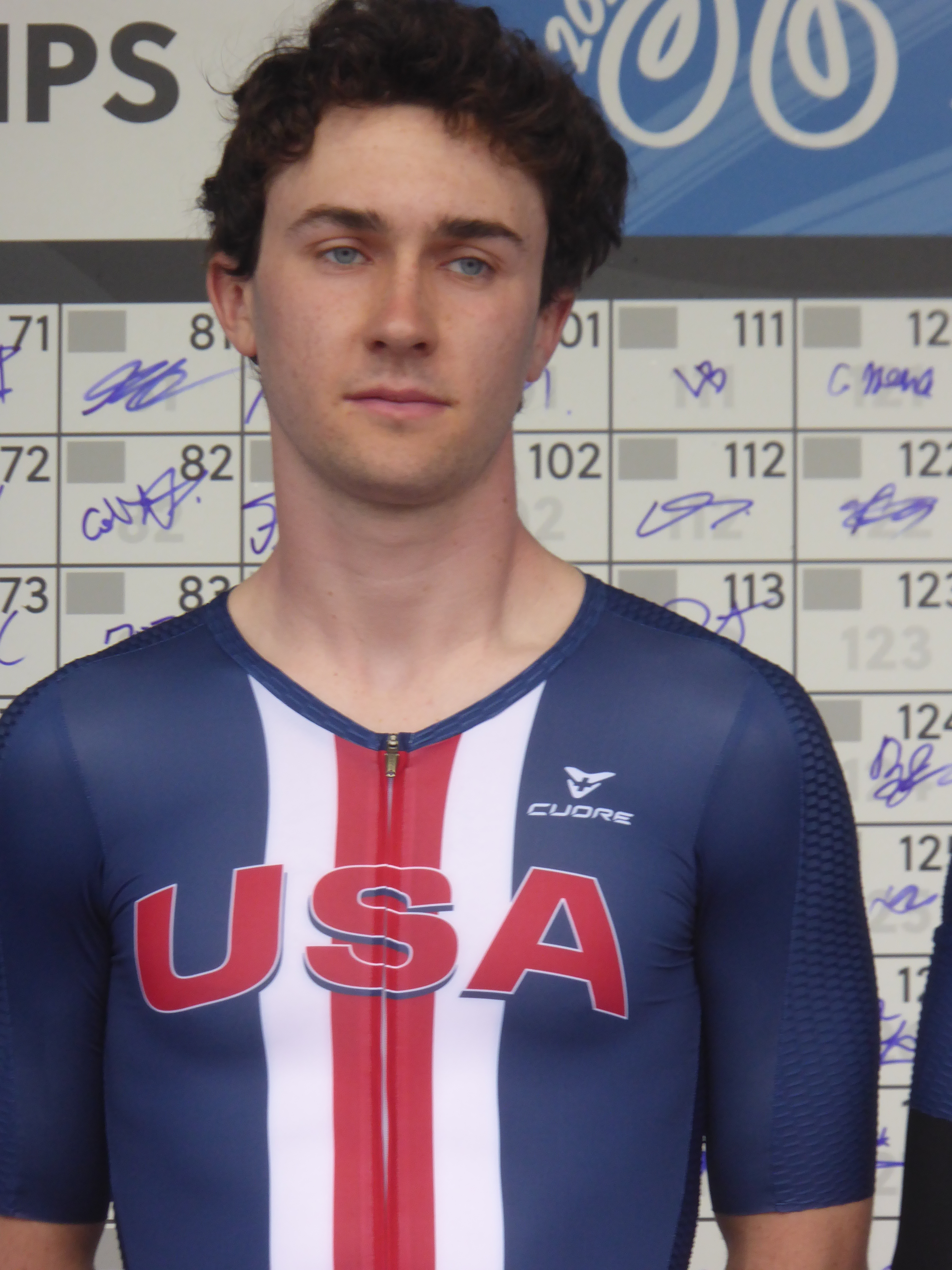
- Cole in 2023

Personal information
- Born: May 1, 2004 (age 22) Chapel Hill, North Carolina
- Height: 1.84 m (6 ft 0 in)
- Weight: 71 kg (157 lb)

Cycling career
- Sport: Cycling
- Current team: Team Winston Salem–Flow
- Discipline: Road
- Role: Rider

Amateur teams
- 2021–2023: Velocious Sport
- 2025–: Team Winston Salem–Flow

Professional team
- 2024: UAE Team Emirates Gen Z

Owen Cole (born May 1, 2004) is an American cyclist, who currently rides for Team Winston Salem–Flow. In 2023, he won the US national under-23 road race championships.

== Early life ==
Cole is from Chapel Hill, North Carolina and attends the University of North Carolina-Chapel Hill. He was introduced to cycling by his father. Cole competed in Mountain Biking prior to turning his attention to road racing.

== Career ==
In Albuquerque, New Mexico in May 2023, Cole won the USA Cycling Collegiate road race, and finished third in the time trial. The following month, Cole won the 2023 US U23 national title at the USA Cycling Amateur Road Nationals in Roanoke, Virginia.

He was selected for the 2023 UCI Road World Championships held in Glasgow, in August 2023.

== Major results ==
2023
1st Road race, National Under-23 Road Championships
2024
3rd Time trial, National Under-23 Road Championships
7th Gran Premio della Liberazione
2025
1st Stage 2 Vuelta a la Comunidad de Madrid Under-23
2nd Time trial, National Under-23 Road Championships
3rd Overall Redlands Bicycle Classic

1st Stage 2

2026
1st Overall Tour de la Guadeloupe

1st Young rider classification

National Under-23 Road Championships

2nd Time trial
5th Road race

2nd Overall Redlands Bicycle Classic
