= Robert Schneider (cyclist) =

American cyclist

Personal information
- Born: January 17, 1944 (age 82) Madison, Wisconsin, United States

Cycling career
- Sport: Cycling

Robert Schneider (born January 17, 1944) is a former American cyclist. He competed in the individual road race at the 1972 Summer Olympics.
