= Rob Parsons =

Australian YouTuber and filmmaker

- Born: Tasmania, Australia
- Occupation: YouTuber

YouTube information
- Channel: Rob Parsons
- Years active: 8
- Subscribers: 213,000
- Views: 22,047,232
- Last updated: January 29, 2026

Rob Parsons is an Australian YouTuber, filmmaker, and amateur wilderness surveyor who is known for his involvement in the search for Celine Cremer, a hiker who disappeared in Waratah, Tasmania, in 2023. He is also known for his push for Tasmania to update its commercial filming laws to be more inclusive and affordable for social media influencers and small-scale content creators.

== Biography ==
Parsons was born in Tasmania. He is a descendent of Charles Octavius Parsons, a pastoralist who arrived at Van Diemen's Land in 1823. He was appointed commissariat storekeeper at Macquarie Harbour Penal Station, but eventually shifted into farming.

Prior to pursuing YouTube, Parsons worked a full-time job with a typical work week, using his weekends to escape from his life. He planned his first hiking trip and documented it in 2019, which became his first YouTube video. Up until that point, Parsons had used alcohol and recreational drugs as an escape, behavior he described as a problem with substance abuse. Over time he replaced the substances with spending time outdoors, until he began celebrating years of sobriety. He then met his wife who supported his videography aspirations and they worked to become self-employed. They had their first child in 2023. After learning about his ancestry, Parsons and his wife became determined to live in a small town where they could homestead like his ancestors.

In 2021, Parsons and a team of two other YouTubers found the lost grave of Huon piner, John Stannard, while prospecting. 19-year-old Stannard had drowned while working 120 years earlier. They later restored the grave with a new headstone.

== Commercial filming laws ==
In August 2023, Parsons was sanctioned for filming without a business license in the Tasmanian wilderness after he posted a 90-minute film on YouTube of a 9-day expedition for evidence of the extinct thylacine, a marsupial believed to have died out (except those in captivity) several thousand years prior. As of August 2023, the video had over 400,000 views. Parsons received a notice that he violated several other state laws, including filming with a drone without a permit and making a campfire where only fuel stoves were allowed.

Parsons criticised the Tasmania Parks and Wildlife Service (PWS) for treating small-scale content creators the same as large-scale commercial organisations, arguing that the laws were outdated and not in line with other states' laws and price structures for licenses. Parsons said that the PWS targeted him with "quite malice," and said that he couldn't find any case where other content creators were prosecuted. The PWS watched his videos during a months-long investigation into Parsons to build the case against him. He worked with PWS to obtain the business license they required, but pushed for the laws to be changed to match those in other states. After the three-month period stipulated for the license, Parsons had still not received anything from PWS.

On 1 November 2023, another YouTuber, Andrew St Pierre White, a four-wheel drive community influencer, joined in pressing PWS to update their laws to make content creation affordable for individuals. White interviewed another YouTuber, Harry Fisher, who said that to get a license to make content in Tasmania involved a $440 license and more than $2,000 in insurance. He also said that WPS demanded a detailed itinerary to assess his visit for potential negative impacts to the state. PWS argued that they wanted to control which areas of Tasmania content creators promote to the world. The YouTubers claimed that the PWS was killing "the modern explorer."

PWS then granted Parsons a license several weeks later, which he rejected as so strict that it threatened his social media business model and would make him unable to make the type of content he makes. The license required him to stay on constructed roads and tracks at all times. The PWS then said that it would examine its policies. Kristie Johnston and other Parliament Members argued that the laws were outdated and criminalised videographers and photographers trying to make a living on social media by promoting Australia to the world. The PWS created an "Enthusiast Business License" in 2025.

== Search for Celine Cremer ==
Parsons began following in 2024 the case of Celine Cremer, a Belgian hiker who went missing near Philosopher Falls in Tasmania in June 2023. Because he was familiar with the Cradle Mountain area from his remote wilderness videos, he sought the cell phone data from the Cremer family's private investigator to assist in searching the area. He posted a video analysing the cell phone data and planning a search which garnered nearly a million views. His videos over the subsequent months spurred significant public interest. He then organised a search party in conjunction with the Cremer family's private search party efforts, which took place in December 2025.

Leading up to the search party, Parsons conducted his own searches that he published on YouTube, focused on retracing Cremer's possible paths and narrowing the best area for the December search. His efforts led to a theory that Cremer had dropped her phone at the last GPS point recorded and had left the trail in an attempt to take the most direct route back to her vehicle. Her phone was found approximately 60 metres (200 ft) from the last GPS point during the December search and a water bottle and makeshift poncho in the subsequent days. While the search party paused to wait for forensic evidence that the bottle was Cremer's, Parsons and some other volunteers confirmed that the brand of water was sold at the restaurant where she worked, and that the expiration date indicated it had been sold shortly before her disappearance, and continued to search on their own. Parsons focused his search on footprints that had been found near the river bank in 2023. They had been previously disregarded due to their remote location away from the trail. He argued that the prints were now in the path she likely took. On 28 January 2026, one of the volunteers, bushwhacker Jarrod Boys, discovered remains likely to be that of Cremer's, as no other people had been reported missing in the area.
