= Lyn Lemaire =

American triathlete

Personal information
- Nationality: United States
- Born: July 6, 1951 (age 75) Santa Monica, California, U.S.
Medal record
Event	1st	2nd	3rd
Ironman World Championship	1	0	0
Total	1	0	0
Men's athletics
Representing United States
Olympic Games
Ironman World Championship
Gold medal – first place	1979	Individual

Eleanor Lynette Lemaire (born July 6, 1951), also known as Lyn Lemaire, is an American former triathlete and championship cyclist. In 1979 she was the first woman to complete the Hawaii Ironman Triathlon, becoming the world's first female "Ironman" and – by default as the only woman in the race – the first female winner of the Ironman championship. She also held the U.S. women's record for the 25-mile (40 km) bicycle time trial.

== Early life and education ==
Lemaire was born in Santa Monica, California, and educated at UCLA, where she graduated Phi Beta Kappa in biochemistry in 1974. At high school she entered four national swimming championships, and at UCLA she played all three positions in basketball. As a senior, she cycled from Vancouver to Los Angeles, and the following summer vacation she spent cycle touring around England and northern Europe.

== Bicycle racing achievements ==
After finishing second in 1975, Lemaire won the U.S. National 25-mile (40 km) time trial championships in 1976, setting a new record of 1:00:06.7. She retained her title the following year, and finished second in 1978. At the 1976 U.S. National track championships held in Northbrook, IL, she finished third in the 3000 m individual pursuit, beating Susan Gurney into 4th place. In the same event two years later, she again placed third, in a time of 4:14.17, a faster time than the second place racer, Betsy Davis. In the U.S. National Road Race Championships, she placed 7th in the 1975 event (35 mi) and 10th in the 1977 event (38.24 mi).

== Ironman ==
The second annual Hawaii Ironman race was held January 1979 during Honolulu's stormy season and in the middle of some of the worst weather for several years. The weather forced the postponement of the race by one day, and remained sufficiently bad that only 15 out of the original 28 entrants attempted the race. Among these was Lemaire, the only woman in the race.

At one point in the bike stage she was in second place, only 10 minutes behind the race leader and eventual winner, Tom Warren; she was 21 minutes behind the leader at the end of the bike stage, and eventually finished in 5th place overall, in a time of 12:55:38.

== Later life ==
Lemaire entered Harvard Law School in September 1979.

In 1984, with investment from Norman Raben, she founded Ultrasport magazine, becoming its Editor-in-chief.

== Results ==
Date	Position	Event	Swim time	Bike time	Run time	transition time	Total time
1979	1st	Ironman Triathlon, Hawaii	1:16:20	6:30:00	5:10:00		12:55:38
