= Timmy Duggan =

American cyclist

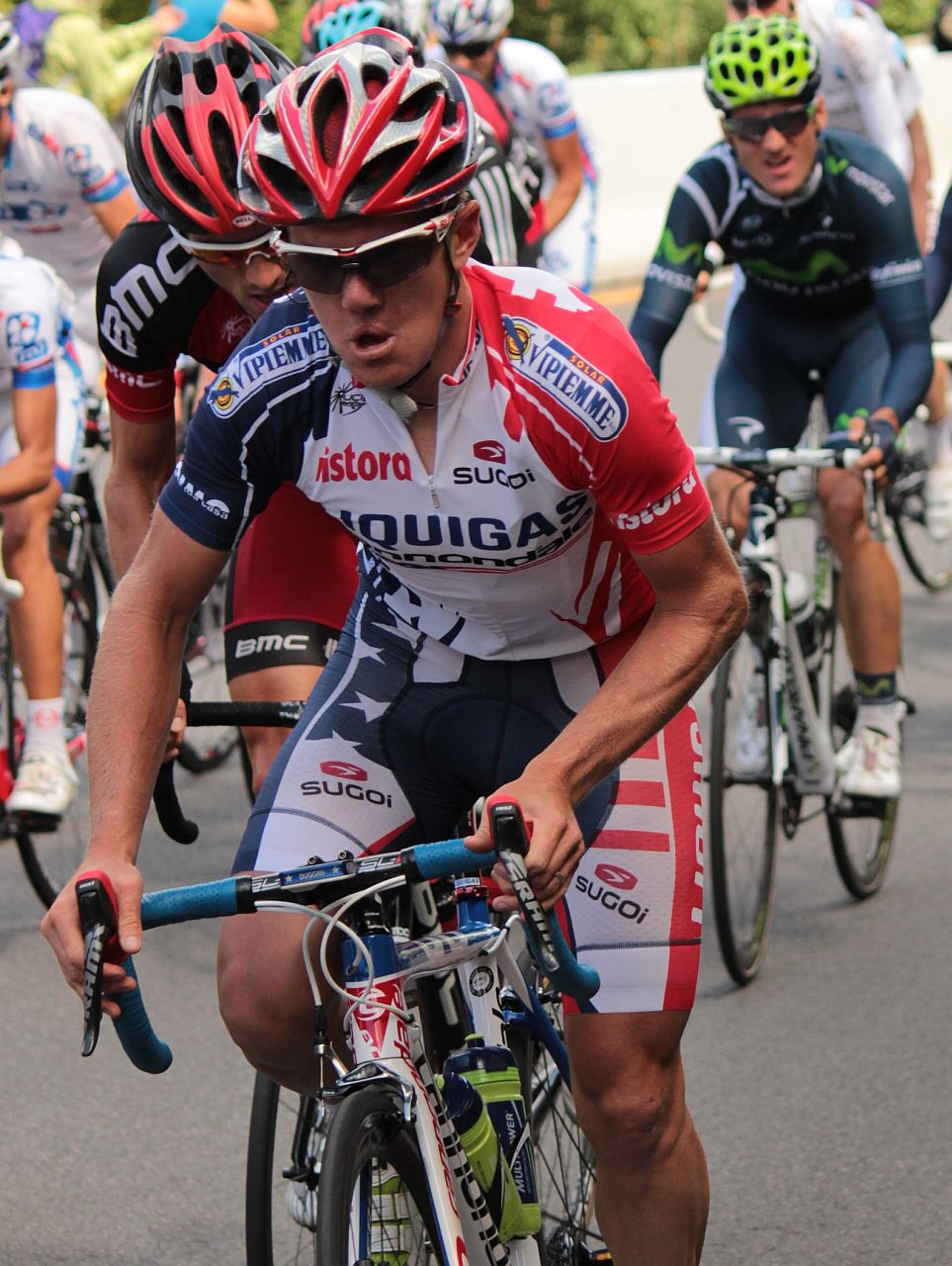
- Duggan at the 2012 Grand Prix Cycliste de Montréal

Personal information
- Full name: Timmy Duggan
- Nickname: Timmy
- Born: Boulder, Colorado, U.S.
- Height: 5 ft 8 in (1.73 m)
- Weight: 140 lb (64 kg)

Cycling career
- Sport: Cycling
- Discipline: Road
- Role: Rider
- Rider type: All-rounder

Amateur teams
- 2002–2003: Vecchio's
- 2004: TIAA–CREF

Professional teams
- 2005–2010: Garmin-Slipstream
- 2011–2012: Liquigas–Cannondale
- 2013: Saxo–Tinkoff

Major wins
- National Road Race Championships (2012)

Timothy Duggan (born November 14, 1982) is a retired American professional road racing cyclist, who competed as a professional between 2005 and 2013. Duggan turned professional in 2005 with TIAA–CREF (Slipstream Sports), which morphed into Garmin. After six years with the squad, Duggan left for Liquigas–Cannondale in 2011. During his time with Liquigas–Cannondale, Duggan won the 2012 United States National Road Race Championships. In 2013, Duggan competed with Saxo–Tinkoff.

== Biography ==
=== Early life ===
Born in Boulder, Colorado, Duggan skied competitively in high school, and became involved in cycling to maintain conditioning during the off season. He excelled in cycling, and after graduation pursued it professionally.

=== Career ===
Duggan's first national championship experience came in 2003 when he placed second in the National Under-23 Time Trial Championships. In 2004, Duggan placed second in the National Under-23 Time Trial Championships and third in the National Under-23 Road Race Championships. Duggan turned professional with TIAA–CREF the following year.

In 2008, while racing at the Tour of Georgia, Timmy was involved in a high speed crash on a descent that resulted in a severe, life changing head injury (sub-arachnoid hemorrhage and subdural hematoma) and was forced to take nearly a year out of racing.

Following a six-year stint with Garmin, Duggan signed with Liquigas–Cannondale for the 2011 and 2012 seasons. In 2012, Duggan won the National Road Race Championships and was a member of the Olympic Team where he finished the race less than a minute behind the winner, in the main peloton with many of the pre-race favorites. Duggan left Liquigas–Cannondale at the end of the 2012 season, and was scheduled to join SpiderTech–C10 for the 2013 season. However, the team was disbanded prior to the end of 2012, and Duggan was freed from his original contract. He later signed for Saxo–Tinkoff in November 2012, on a one-year contract. In January 2013, he fractured his leg while negotiating a roundabout in Stage 3 of the Tour Down Under. Following the 2013 season, Duggan retired from professional cycling.

== Palmarès ==
2003
2nd, National Under-23 Time Trial Championships
2004
2nd, National Under-23 Time Trial Championships
3rd, National Under-23 Road Race Championships
2006
5th, Overall, Volta a Lleida
2007
3rd, Overall, Tour of Elk Grove
3rd, National Time Trial Championships
4th, Overall, Vuelta Chihuahua Internacional
4th, Univest Grand Prix
2008
1st, Stage 4 (TTT), Tour de Georgia
2011
1st, Most Aggressive, USA Pro Cycling Challenge
7th, Overall, Tour of Utah
2012
1st, National Road Race Championships
6th, National Time Trial Championships

Sporting positions
Preceded by Matthew Busche	USA National Road Race Champion; 2012	Succeeded by Fred Rodriguez
