= Cindy Olavarri =

American cyclist (born 1955)

Personal information
- Born: March 23, 1955 (age 71) Pleasant Hill, California, U.S.

Cycling career
- Sport: Cycling
- Disciplines: Track; Road
- Role: Rider
Medal record
Representing the United States
Women's track cycling
World Championships
Silver medal – second place	1983 Zürich	Individual pursuit

Cynthia "Cindy" Olavarri (born March 23, 1955) is an American former professional racing cyclist.

She won the silver medal in the individual pursuit at the 1983 UCI Track Cycling World Championships. That year, she also won the kilometer at the national championships.

Olavarri also competed in road racing, winning the national time trial championships in 1983 as well. She also saw some success in stage racing, placing third in the 1983 Coors Classic and second in the 1984 Women's Challenge.

In 1984, she tested positive for steroid use and was removed from the 1984 Summer Olympics team, later admitting she used them intermittently for three years.

Olavarri received degrees in physical education and exercise physiology from the University of California.
