= Blake Caldwell =

American cyclist (born 1984)

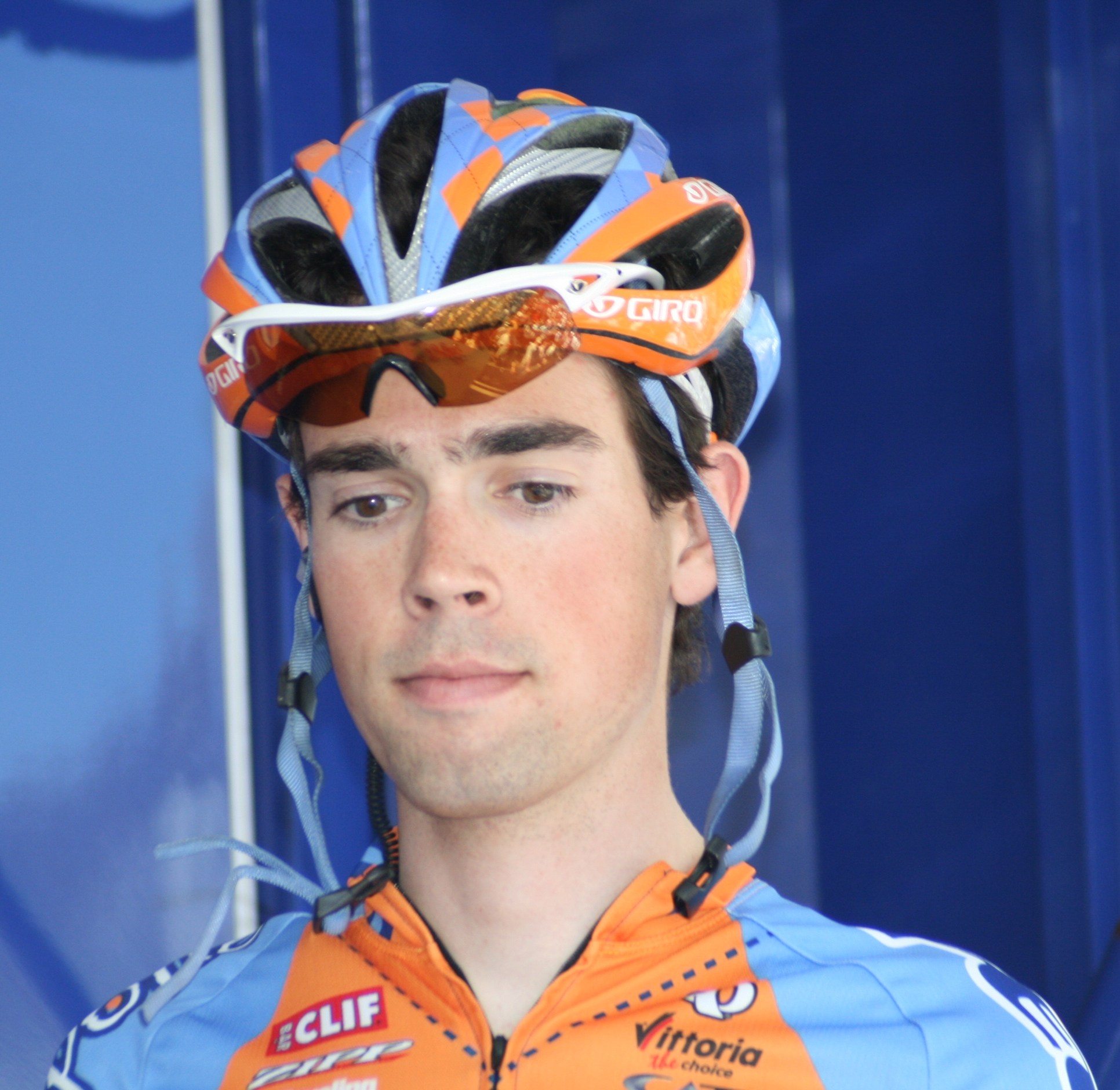

Personal information
- Born: Boulder, Colorado, United States of America

Cycling career
- Sport: Cycling
- Current team: Retired
- Discipline: Road
- Role: Rider

Amateur teams
- 2003: Marco Polo
- 2004: 5280 Subaru

Professional teams
- 2005–2006: TIAA–CREF
- 2007–2009: Slipstream–Chipotle
- 2010: Team Holowesko Partners

Blake Caldwell is a former American road bicycle racer. Notable results include placing second to Tyler Hamilton in the 2008 US Professional Road Race Championship in a photo finish losing to Hamilton by less than a tire's width. He also won stage 2 of the 2008 Tour of Utah, finishing 2nd in GC. His other professional win was stage 6 of the 2006 Tour of Utah. which was named 2006 Ride of the Year by cycling publication VeloNews.

As a junior cyclist, he won 11 Junior National Championships titles in road and track events and competed in the 2001 UCI Junior World Road Championships. In his first year as an amateur in 2003, he had Stagiaire rides in 2003 with US professional team Prime Alliance and UCI Professional Team Marco Polo. He joined Team 5280-Subaru (now known as EF Education–EasyPost) in 2004. As a perennial member of the Slipstream cohort, he continued with team Slipstream into the UCI Pro Tour in 2009.

== Osteoporosis ==
During the 2008 Tour of Missouri, he suffered a crash in which he fractured his hip and collarbone sidelining him for the remainder of 2008. After returning to professional competition in the spring of 2009, he again fractured his hip while training in Girona, Spain. The series of hip fractures led to a bone density test and a diagnosis of osteoporosis. In 2010 he stepped down from the higher level Team Garmin–Chipotle, for whom he had ridden since 2007, to race at a less competitive level while seeking to reverse the onset of osteoporosis.

== Medicine ==
Having studied medicine as a consequence of his disease in addition to computer science, Calwell finished Columbia University Vagelos College of Physicians and Surgeons in the class of 2024. He completed a year of surgical internship at Bassett Medical Center in Cooperstown, New York and began radiology residency at Columbia University in 2024.
