= Tom Schuler =

American cyclist

Personal information
- Born: November 28, 1956 (age 69) Birmingham, Michigan, U.S.

Cycling career
- Sport: Cycling
- Current team: Retired
- Discipline: Road bicycle racing
- Role: Rider

Professional teams
- 1976, 1980: American Olympic Cycling Team
- 1991–2002: Volvo-Cannondale Mountain Bike Team
- 1991–2003: Saturn Cycling Team
- 2005: Advantage Benefits Endeavour Cycling Team
- 2006: TARGETRAINING
- 2007: Colavita Olive Oil-Sutter Home Wine
- 1999–2009: Timex Multisport Team
- 2008–2009: Zoot Ultra Triathlon Team
- 2008–2009: Team Type 1
- 2018 - present: Detroit Cycling Championship

Tom Schuler (born November 28, 1956, in Birmingham, Michigan) is a retired American professional road bicycle racer and founder of Team Sports Inc., a sports management company in cycling, mountain biking, triathlon, and roller blading. Since 2006, he has been directeur sportif (team manager) for Targettraining, a UCI Continental team riding USA Cycling's national racing calendar circuit, and Zoot Sports Triathlon Team. In 2009, he was general manager of Team Type 1, the Timex Multisport Team and the Zoot Ultra Triathlon Team.

Schuler was directeur sportif of Saturn Cycling Team, a professional cycling team from 1991 to 2003, and helped found the Volvo-Cannondale mountain bike team.

Schuler, a graduate from the University of Michigan, represented the United States at the 1976 and 1980 Summer Olympics and was one of the original seven members of the 7-Eleven Cycling Team. He was the 1987 USPRO national road champion and the 1981 US professional criterium champion.

== Career ==
In 2009 Schuler became a co-founder of the Tour of America's Dairyland, a 10-day race in Wisconsin that attracts Pro-Teams and riders from around the world.

He also co-founded the Prairie State Cycling Series, a multi-venue race, sponsored by Intelligentsia Coffee and named the Intelligentsia Cup powered by SRAM.

In October 2007 he was inducted into the U.S. Bicycling Hall of Fame.

=== Directeur sportif/team manager ===
- 1991–2002: Volvo-Cannondale Mountain Bike Team
- 1991–2003: Saturn Cycling Team
- 1999–2009: Timex Multisport Team
- 2005: Advantage Benefits Endeavour Cycling Team
- 2006: TARGETRAINING
- 2007: Colavita Olive Oil-Sutter Home Wine. Men's and Women's Team
- 2008–2009: Zoot Ultra Triathlon Team
- 2008–2009: Team Type 1
- 2018–present: Detroit Cycling Championship (USA Cycling Pro Road Tour)

=== Highlights ===
1979

- Fitchburg Longsjo Classic

1980

- U.S. Olympic Cycling Team

1986 – 7-Eleven Cycling Team

- Athens Twilight Criterium

1987 – 7-Eleven Cycling Team

- national road champion.
