= Jeff Bradley (cyclist) =

American cyclist (born 1961)

Personal information
- Born: May 29, 1961 (age 65) Davenport, Iowa, U.S.

Cycling career
- Sport: Cycling
- Role: Rider

Jeff Bradley (born May 29, 1961) is an American former professional racing cyclist. He rode in the 1987 Tour de France.
