= Mary Jane Reoch =

American cyclist

- Born: January 2, 1945; Philadelphia, Pennsylvania, United States
- Died: September 11, 1993 (aged 48); Dallas, Texas, United States
- Other names: Miji
- Occupation: Cyclist

Mary Jane Reoch (January 2, 1945 – September 11, 1993) was an American cyclist. She won 11 national championships during her cycling career and afterwards worked as a cycling coach. She was killed in a road accident while training a client in 1993. She was posthumously inducted into the United States Bicycling Hall of Fame in 1994.

== Early life and career ==
Reoch was born on January 2, 1945, in Philadelphia, Pennsylvania. She began cycling and racing in her mid-twenties.

Reoch won 11 national championships in various cycling events throughout the 1970s and early 80s, and was on the world championship team 9 times. She received first place in the National Track Championship 7 times, between 1973 and 1980, and the National Time Trial Championship once in 1975. She also received second or third place in these events, as well as in the National Road Championship, many more times in different years. She was second place in the 3 km pursuit at the Belgium World Track Championships, in 1975, and third place in the 3 km pursuit at the Italy World Track Championships, in 1976. In addition, Reoch won the local Tour of Somerville and Fitchburg Longsjo Classic in 1976 and 1979, respectively.

In 1977, she started to work as a cycling coach, coaching many individuals and teams for roughly the next 15 years. She is known in particular for coaching Connie Carpenter, who won a gold medal in the 1984 Summer Olympics.

== Personal life ==
At the age of 35, she rode 12 miles (19 km) on her bike to the hospital to give birth to her first daughter, Solange. She married John Reoch, a lawyer. The couple moved to Dallas and later divorced.

== Death ==
Reoch was killed in a road accident on September 11, 1993. She was training a cycling student named Bill Seals at White Rock Lake in Dallas at roughly 9:15 am. While they were cycling, a pickup truck went into their lane, striking Reoch head-on and throwing her 95 feet (29 m) into the lake, killing her. Seals flew over his handlebars and landed on the pavement, out of panic. The pickup truck driver fled the scene. He was arrested in Michoacán, Mexico, in July 1996 and charged with involuntary manslaughter.

=== Posthumous honors ===
In 1994, Reoch was posthumously inducted into the United States Bicycling Hall of Fame. Fuji Bikes established the annual Miji Reoch Award for "the best young female rider under the age of 23", which includes a $1,000 cash prize.
