= Dale Stetina =

American racing cyclist

Personal information
- Born: July 9, 1956 (age 70) Indianapolis, Indiana, U.S.

Cycling career
- Sport: Cycling
- Current team: Retired
- Discipline: Road
- Role: Rider

Professional teams
- 1981: Aspen Skiwear–Dia Compe
- 1983–1985: Aspen Skiwear

Dale Stetina (born July 9, 1956) is an American former racing cyclist, who competed in the late 1970s through the 1980s. He is a two-time U.S. National Road Champion and two-time winner of one of the Coors Classic held in Boulder, Colorado. He also won the Mount Washington Hillclimb in 1980.

== Background ==
Stetina hails from an Indianapolis, Indiana-based cycling family which includes three brothers: Wayne, Joel, and Troy. Stetina's son, Peter also competes as a professional cyclist. His father Roy was also a state cycling champion of Indiana. In 2007 Stetina was inducted into the U.S. Bicycling Hall of Fame.

Stetina also won the overall classification of Vuelta Ciclista a Costa Rica in December 1980 in addition to three stages.

Dale's younger brother Troy who competed in the sport and was an event winner on the same day as Wayne and Dale in 1973 is an internationally known musician and guitar teacher. Dale is the father of cyclist Peter Stetina.

== Major results ==
1977
2nd Overall Coors Classic
1978
1st Road race, National Amateur Road Championships
1979
1st Overall Coors Classic
5th Road race, Pan American Games
1980
1st Road race, National Amateur Road Championships
1st Overall Vuelta Ciclista a Costa Rica

1st Stages 5, 8 & 9

1st Mount Washington Hillclimb
1981
1st Stage 3 Coors Classic
1983
1st Overall Coors Classic
1st Overall Cascade Classic
1984
1st Overall Cascade Classic

== Notes ==
- Fecoci (Costa Rica Cyclist Association Library), 1980.
