= Jessica Phillips (cyclist) =

American cyclist

Personal information
- Born: May 22, 1978 (age 48) Aspen, Colorado, U.S.

Cycling career
- Sport: Cycling
- Discipline: Road cycling

Jessica Phillips (born May 22, 1978 in Aspen, Colorado) is a former professional road cyclist from the United States. She represented her nation at the 2009 UCI Road World Championships in the Women's time trial. She is married to former professional cyclist Tejay van Garderen.
