= 2007 Tour of Missouri =

The 2007 Tour of Missouri is the inaugural edition of a professional road bicycle racing stage race held in Missouri that made its debut on September 11, 2007, with six days of racing. Run by same organizers as the Tour de Georgia and the Amgen Tour of California, the Tour of Missouri is being billed as the third highest profile domestic race in the United States. The Tour is part of the 2006–07 UCI America Tour and the inaugural 2007 USA Cycling Professional Tour.

The Missouri terrain is not mountainous by California and Georgia standards but expect three of the six stages to be contested on relentless rolling hills. No title sponsor has been announced. The planned course:

- Day 1: Kansas City, road race, out-and-back course starting and ending in the Plaza
- Day 2: Clinton–Springfield, road race
- Day 3: Branson, individual time trial
- Day 4: Lebanon–Columbia, road race
- Day 5: Jefferson City–St. Charles, road race
- Day 6: St. Louis, circuit race

== Award Jerseys ==
Stage (Winner)	Missouri Department of Tourism General Classification Yellow Jersey	Edward Jones Investments Points Classification Green Jersey	Michelob ULTRA Mountains Classification Gold Polka Dot Jersey	Build A Bear Best Young Rider Blue Jersey	Drury Hotels Most Aggressive Rider Red Jersey	Team Classification
Stage 1 (Iván Domínguez)	Iván Domínguez	Iván Domínguez*	Jeff Louder	James Meadley	Gregorio Ladino	Colavita/Sutter Home p/b Cooking Light
Stage 2 (George Hincapie)	George Hincapie	George Hincapie*	Jeff Louder	James Meadley	William Frishkorn	Team Slipstream; Powered By Chipotle
Stage 3 (ITT) (Levi Leipheimer)	George Hincapie	George Hincapie*	Jeff Louder	Steven Cozza	William Frishkorn	Team Slipstream; Powered By Chipotle
Stage 4 (Luciano André Pagliarini Mendonca)	George Hincapie	Luciano André Pagliarini Mendonca	Jeff Louder	Steven Cozza	Darren Lill	Team Slipstream; Powered By Chipotle
Stage 5 (Danny Pate)	George Hincapie	Luciano André Pagliarini Mendonca	Jeff Louder	Steven Cozza	John Fredy Parra	Team Slipstream; Powered By Chipotle
Stage 6 / Final (Iván Domínguez)	George Hincapie	Iván Domínguez	Jeff Louder	Steven Cozza	John Fredy Parra	Team Slipstream; Powered By Chipotle

- For Stage 2, Zach Bell wore the Sprint Points Jersey.
- For Stages 3 and 4, Dominique Rollin wore the Sprint Points Jersey.
- Throughout the race, Svein Tuft (Symmetrics) wore the white jersey as leader of the 2006–07 UCI America Tour individual points standings.
- Throughout the race, Levi Leipheimer (Discovery Channel) wore the red-white-blue jersey as United States Road Race Champion.

== Stages ==
=== Stage 1: 2007-09-11: Kansas City, Missouri out-and-back road race, 85 miles (136.8 km) ===
Stage 1 result

	Cyclist	Country	Team	Time
1	Iván Domínguez	Cuba	TUP	3h 05'07"
2	Zach Bell	Canada	SYM	s.t.
3	Kyle Wamsley	United States	NIC	s.t.

General Classification after Stage 1

	Cyclist	Country	Team	Time
1	Iván Domínguez	Cuba	TUP	3h 05'07"
2	Zach Bell	Canada	SYM	s.t.
3	Kyle Wamsley	United States	NIC	s.t.

=== Stage 2: 2007-09-12: Clinton–Springfield road race, 125 miles (201.2 km) ===
Stage 2 result

	Cyclist	Country	Team	Time
1	George Hincapie	United States	DSC	
2	Frank Pipp	United States	HNM	s.t.
3	Dominique Rollin	Canada	NIC	s.t.

General Classification after Stage 2

	Cyclist	Country	Team	Time
1	George Hincapie	United States	DSC	
2	Frank Pipp	United States	HNM	
3	Dominique Rollin	Canada	NIC	

=== Stage 3: 2007-09-13: Branson individual time trial, 18 miles (29 km) ===
Stage 3 result

	Cyclist	Country	Team	Time
1	Levi Leipheimer	United States	DSC	39'37"
2	Nathan O'Neill	Australia	HNM	+ 0'16"
3	Matti Helminen	Finland	DFL	+ 1'27"

General Classification after Stage 3

	Cyclist	Country	Team	Time
1	George Hincapie	United States	DSC	8:22:34
2	William Frischkorn	United States	TSL	+ 1:40
3	David Cañada	Spain	SDV	+ 2:22

=== Stage 4: 2007-09-14: Lebanon–Columbia road race, 133.4 miles (214.7 km) ===
Stage 4 result

	Cyclist	Country	Team	Time
1	Luciano Pagliarini	Italy	SDV	39'37"
2	Andrew Pinfold	Canada	SYM	s.t.
3	Iván Domínguez	Cuba	TUP	s.t.

General Classification after Stage 4

	Cyclist	Country	Team	Time
1	George Hincapie	United States	DSC	8:22:34
2	William Frischkorn	United States	TSL	+ 1:40
3	David Cañada	Spain	SDV	+ 2:22

=== Stage 5: 2007-09-16: Jefferson City–St. Charles, road race, 123 miles (198 km) ===
Stage 5 result

	Cyclist	Country	Team	Time
1	Danny Pate	United States	TLS	4:50:21
2	John Parra	Colombia	TUA	+0:08
3	Jeff Louder	United States	HNM	s.t.

General Classification after Stage 5

	Cyclist	Country	Team	Time
1	George Hincapie	United States	DSC	18:23:13
2	William Frischkorn	United States	TSL	+ 1:40
3	David Cañada	Spain	SDV	+ 2:22

=== Stage 6: 2007-09-17: St. Louis circuit race, 74 miles (119.1 km) ===
Stage 6 result

	Cyclist	Country	Team	Time
1	Iván Domínguez	Cuba	TUP	3h 05'07"
2	Andrew Pinfold	Canada	SYM	s.t.
3	Dominique Rollin	Canada	NIC	s.t.

Final General Classification

	Cyclist	Country	Team	Time
1	George Hincapie	United States	DSC	18:23:13
2	William Frischkorn	United States	TSL	+ 1:40
3	Dominique Rollin	Canada	NIC	

== Teams ==
- (United States) Discovery Channel Pro Cycling Team (DSC)
- (Spain) Saunier Duval–Prodir (SDV)
- (United Kingdom) DFL–Cyclingnews–Litespeed (DFL)
- (Germany) Team Sparkasse (TSP)
- (United States) Health Net Pro Cycling Team Presented by Maxxis (HNM)
- (United States) Navigators Insurance Cycling Team (NIC)
- (United States) Team Slipstream Powered By Chipotle (TSL)
- (Canada) Symmetrics Cycling Team (SYM)
- (Mexico) Tecos de la Universidad de Guadalajara (TUA)
- (United States) Toyota–United Pro Cycling Team
- (United States) BMC Racing Team (BMC)
- (United States) Jelly Belly Cycling Team (JBC)
- (United States) KodakGallery.com – Sierra Nevada Brewing Co. (OSN)
- (United States) Colavita / Sutter Home Presented by Cooking Light (COL)
- (United States) USA Cycling National Development Team (USA)
