= 2007 USA Cycling Professional Tour =

The 2007 USA Cycling Professional Tour is the inaugural year of a professional road bicycle racing series organized by USA Cycling.

Levi Leipheimer and the Discovery Channel team won the overall individual and team titles respectively. Leipheimer finished the season with 381 points over teammate George Hincapie, Germany's Bernhard Eisel, Juan José Haedo of Argentina and Slovenia's Janez Brajkovič. The now-defunct Discovery Channel team earned the team title with 810 points over Team CSC, Slipstream–Chipotle, T-Mobile Team and Navigators Insurance.

== Events ==
The 2007 USA Cycling Professional Tour consists of the following 15 one-day races and stage races:

Dates	Race Name	Location	UCI Rating	Winner	Team
February 18–25	Tour of California	California	2.HC	(United States) Levi Leipheimer	Discovery Channel
April 7	U.S. Open Cycling Championships	Richmond, Va.	1.1	(Canada) Svein Tuft	Symmetrics
April 16–22	Tour de Georgia	Georgia	2.HC	(Slovenia) Janez Brajkovič	Discovery Channel
June 3	Lancaster Classic	Lancaster, Pa.	1.1	(Germany) Bernhard Eisel	T-Mobile Team
June 7	Reading Classic	Reading, Pa.	1.1	(Germany) Bernhard Eisel	T-Mobile Team
June 10	Philadelphia International Championship	Philadelphia	1.HC	(Argentina) Juan José Haedo	Team CSC
June 17	Austin Men's Invitational	Austin, Tx.	1.1	postponed till 2008	
June 23	Rochester Twilight Criterium	Rochester, N.Y.	1.2	(Australia) Hilton Clarke	Navigators Insurance
June 30–July 7	Tour of Utah	Utah	2.2	postponed	
August 19	USA Cycling Professional Criterium Championships	Downers Grove, Ill.	N/A	(Canada) Martin Gilbert	Kelly Benefit Strategies–Medifast
September 1	USA Cycling Professional Time Trial Championship	Greenville, S.C.	CN	(United States) David Zabriskie	Team CSC
September 2	USA Cycling Professional Road Championship	Greenville, S.C.	CN	(United States) Levi Leipheimer	Discovery Channel
September 8	Univest Grand Prix	Souderton, Pa.	1.2	(United States) Will Frischkorn	Slipstream–Chipotle
September 11–16	Tour of Missouri	Missouri	2.1	(United States) George Hincapie	Discovery Channel
September 15	Tour de Leelanau	Leelanau County, Mich.	1.2	(United States) Garrett Peltonen	Priority Health–Bissell

== See also ==
- 2007 USA Cycling National Racing Calendar
