= 2011 USA Pro Cycling Challenge =

2010–2011 UCI America Tour
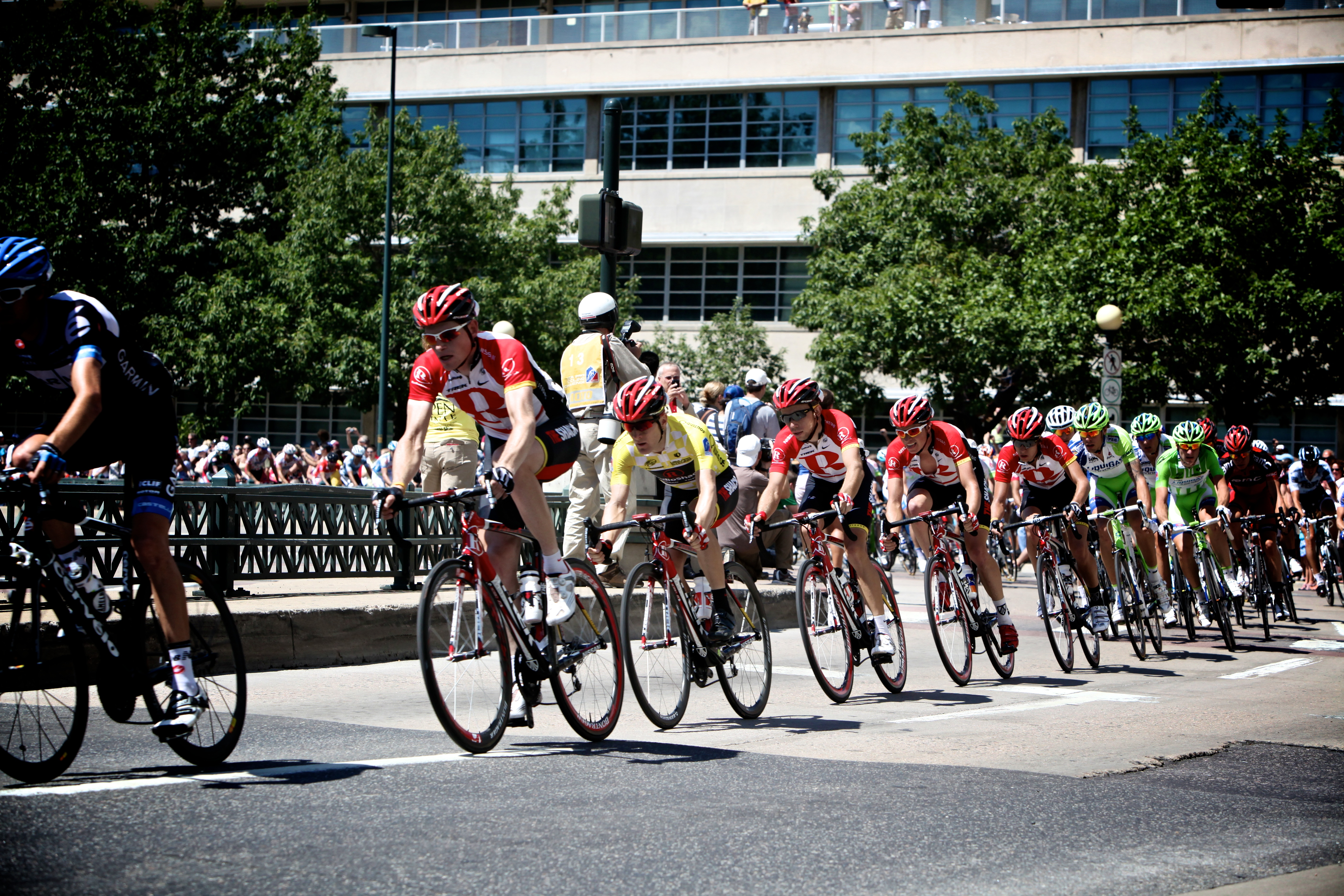
- Stage 6 in Denver

Race details
- Dates: August 22–28, 2011
- Stages: 7
- Winning time: 20h 00' 24"

Results
Jersey awarded to the overall winner	Winner	Levi Leipheimer (USA)	(Team RadioShack)
	Second	Christian Vande Velde (USA)	(Garmin–Cervélo)
	Third	Tejay van Garderen (USA)	(HTC–Highroad)
Jersey awarded to the mountains classification winner	Mountains	Rafael Montiel (COL)	(Gobernación de Antioquia)
Jersey awarded to the youth classification winner	Youth	Tejay van Garderen (USA)	(HTC–Highroad)
Jersey awarded to the sprints classification winner	Sprints	Elia Viviani (ITA)	(Liquigas–Cannondale)
	Team	Garmin–Cervélo	

The 2011 USA Pro Cycling Challenge was the inaugural edition of the USA Pro Cycling Challenge stage race. The race was held from August 22–28, and was rated as a 2.1 event on the UCI America Tour. The race began with a short prologue time trial in Colorado Springs, wound its way through the Rocky Mountains at heights of up to 12,000 feet (3,700 m), and finished in the streets of downtown Denver.

== Participating teams ==
Included in the participating team rosters were the top three 2011 Tour de France riders Cadel Evans, Andy Schleck and Fränk Schleck. The full team list included:

UCI ProTeams

- BMC Racing Team
- Team RadioShack
- Leopard Trek
- Garmin–Cervélo
- HTC–Highroad
- Liquigas–Cannondale
- Saxo Bank–SunGard
- Rabobank

UCI Professional Continental Teams

- UnitedHealthcare
- Team Type 1–Sanofi
- Skil–Shimano
- SpiderTech–C10

UCI Continental Teams

- Bissell
- Team Exergy
- Jelly Belly–Kenda
- Gobernación de Antioquia–Indeportes Antioquia
- EPM–UNE

== Stages ==
Stage results
Stage	Date	Route	Terrain	Length	Winner
P	22 August	Colorado Springs	Individual time trial	8.34 km (5.18 mi)	Patrick Gretsch (GER)
1	23 August	Salida - Crested Butte	Mountain stage	160 km (99 mi)	Levi Leipheimer (USA)
2	24 August	Gunnison – Aspen	Mountain stage	211 km (131 mi)	George Hincapie (USA)
3	25 August	Vail	Individual time trial	16 km (9.9 mi)	Levi Leipheimer (USA)
4	26 August	Avon – Steamboat Springs	Medium mountain stage	133 km (83 mi)	Elia Viviani (ITA)
5	27 August	Steamboat Springs – Breckenridge	Mountain stage	169 km (105 mi)	Elia Viviani (ITA)
6	28 August	Golden – Denver	Medium mountain stage	118.8 km (73.8 mi)	Daniel Oss (ITA)

=== Prologue ===
August 22, 2011 — Colorado Springs, 5.18 miles (8.34 km)

The opening time trial for the race began in the Garden of the Gods national monument and followed a short downhill course that finished in downtown Colorado Springs.

	Rider	Team	Time
1	Patrick Gretsch (DEU)	HTC–Highroad	8' 28"
2	Christian Vande Velde (USA)	Garmin–Cervélo	+ 2"
3	Brent Bookwalter (USA)	BMC Racing Team	+ 4"
4	Robert Förster (DEU)	UnitedHealthcare	+ 5"
5	Jens Voigt (DEU)	Leopard Trek	+ 7"

=== Stage 1 ===
August 23, 2011 — Salida to Crested Butte, 99.4 miles (160.0 km)

The first stage of the race saw the riders ascending 11,315 feet (3,449 m) over Monarch Pass and ending with a short mountaintop finish up to the resort municipality of Mount Crested Butte.

	Rider	Team	Time
1	Levi Leipheimer (USA)	Team RadioShack	4h 29' 22"
2	Sergio Henao (COL)	Gobernación de Antioquia–Indeportes Antioquia	+ 4"
3	Fränk Schleck (LUX)	Leopard Trek	+ 7"
4	Cadel Evans (AUS)	BMC Racing Team	+ 7"
5	Christian Vande Velde (USA)	Garmin–Cervélo	+ 7"

=== Stage 2 ===
August 24, 2011 — Gunnison to Aspen, 131.1 miles (211.0 km)

The queen stage involved nearly 10,000 feet (3,000 m) of climbing, bringing the riders over two of the highest passes in Colorado: the dirt road climb of 12,126 feet (3,696 m) Cottonwood Pass, and 12,095 feet (3,687 m) to Independence Pass.

	Rider	Team	Time
1	George Hincapie (USA)	BMC Racing Team	5h 26' 10"
2	Tejay van Garderen (USA)	HTC–Highroad	s.t.
3	Tom Danielson (USA)	Garmin–Cervélo	s.t.
4	Edward Beltran (COL)	EPM–UNE	s.t.
5	Janier Acevedo (COL)	Gobernación de Antioquia–Indeportes Antioquia	s.t.

=== Stage 3 ===
August 25, 2011 — Vail, 10 miles (16 km)

Contrasting with the prologue time trial, stage 3 was a steep uphill individual test with 1,783 feet (543 m) of climbing over only 10 miles (16 km). The route was the same one used during time trials for the Coors Classic in the 80s. The record for the course, 25:48, was set in the 2008 Teva Mountain Games by Ben Day.

	Rider	Team	Time
1	Levi Leipheimer (USA)	Team RadioShack	25' 47"
2	Christian Vande Velde (USA)	Garmin–Cervélo	+ 0"
3	Rafael Infantino (COL)	EPM–UNE	+ 4"
4	Tom Danielson (USA)	Garmin–Cervélo	+ 33"
5	Stef Clement (NED)	Rabobank	+ 40"

=== Stage 4 ===
August 26, 2011 — Avon to Steamboat Springs, 82.8 miles (133.3 km)

This stage included one sprint point, 99.1 km into the stage.

	Rider	Team	Time
1	Elia Viviani (ITA)	Liquigas–Cannondale	2h 58' 14"
2	Michael Mørkøv (DEN)	Saxo Bank–SunGard	s.t.
3	Kenny Van Hummel (NED)	Skil–Shimano	s.t.
4	Robert Förster (GER)	UnitedHealthcare	s.t.
5	Dennis van Winden (NED)	Rabobank	s.t.

=== Stage 5 ===
August 27, 2011 — Steamboat Springs to Breckenridge, 105.2 miles (169.3 km)

Immediately after leaving Steamboat Springs, the riders ascended Rabbit Ears Pass, a steep pass with about 15 miles (24 km) of climbing and a false summit. After the descent, it's a long slow climb through some of Colorado's most popular ski resorts that culminated in a downhill finish into Breckenridge.

	Rider	Team	Time
1	Elia Viviani (ITA)	Liquigas–Cannondale	4h 04' 31"
2	Jaime Castañeda (COL)	EPM–UNE	s.t.
3	Daniel Oss (ITA)	Liquigas–Cannondale	s.t.
4	Dennis van Winden (NED)	Rabobank	s.t.
5	Jeff Louder (USA)	BMC Racing Team	s.t.

=== Stage 6 ===
August 28, 2011 — Golden to Denver, 73.79 miles (118.75 km)

The final stage of the race began under the "Howdy Folks!" sign on Golden's Main Street, as featured in the film American Flyers. Riders climbed Lookout Mountain, a short but steep climb in the foothills near Golden, and then descended into Denver. Once in the city, they completed six laps through downtown Denver, finishing on Broadway in front of the state capital building. The final day of the race was broadcast live on NBC.

	Rider	Team	Time
1	Daniel Oss (ITA)	Liquigas–Cannondale	2h 27' 08"
2	Elia Viviani (ITA)	Liquigas–Cannondale	s.t.
3	Fred Rodriguez (USA)	Team Exergy	s.t.
4	Daniel Summerhill (USA)	Garmin–Cervélo	s.t.
5	Frank Pipp (USA)	Bissell	+ 2"

== Classification leadership ==
Stage	Winner	General classification	Sprints classification	Mountains classification	Young rider classification	Most Aggressive	Team classification
P	Patrick Gretsch	Patrick Gretsch	no award	no award	Tejay van Garderen	Danny Pate	BMC Racing Team
1	Levi Leipheimer	Levi Leipheimer	Levi Leipheimer	Eduard Beltran Suarez	Tejay van Garderen	Bradley White	BMC Racing Team
2	George Hincapie	Tejay van Garderen	Levi Leipheimer	Walter Pedraza	Tejay van Garderen	André Steensen	BMC Racing Team
3	Levi Leipheimer	Levi Leipheimer	Levi Leipheimer	Walter Pedraza	Tejay van Garderen	André Steensen	Garmin–Cervélo
4	Elia Viviani	Levi Leipheimer	Elia Viviani	Walter Pedraza	Tejay van Garderen	Vladimir Efimkin	Garmin–Cervélo
5	Elia Viviani	Levi Leipheimer	Elia Viviani	Walter Pedraza	Tejay van Garderen	Andy Schleck	Garmin–Cervélo
6	Daniel Oss	Levi Leipheimer	Elia Viviani	Rafael Montiel	Tejay van Garderen	Timmy Duggan	Garmin–Cervélo
Final		Levi Leipheimer	Elia Viviani	Rafael Montiel	Tejay van Garderen	Timmy Duggan	Garmin–Cervélo

== General classification ==
	Rider	Team	Time
1	Levi Leipheimer (USA)	Team RadioShack	20h 00' 24"
2	Christian Vande Velde (USA)	Garmin–Cervélo	+ 11"
3	Tejay van Garderen (USA)	HTC–Highroad	+ 17"
4	Tom Danielson (USA)	Garmin–Cervélo	+ 21"
5	George Hincapie (USA)	BMC Racing Team	+ 53"
6	Rafael Infantino (COL)	EPM–UNE	+ 1' 14"
7	Cadel Evans (AUS)	BMC Racing Team	+ 1' 18"
8	Stef Clement (NED)	Rabobank	+ 1' 42"
9	Bruno Pires (POR)	Leopard Trek	+ 1' 49"
10	Rory Sutherland (AUS)	UnitedHealthcare	+ 1' 50"
