= Andrew Pinfold =

Personal information
- Born: 14 August 1978 (age 48) Woodbridge, Ontario

Cycling career
- Sport: Cycling
- Current team: Retired
- Disciplines: Road; Cyclo-cross
- Role: Rider

Professional teams
- 1999: Jet Fuel Coffee–Vitasoy
- 2003: Atlas Cold–Italpasta
- 2005–2008: Symmetrics
- 2009–2011: OUCH–Maxxis

Andrew Pinfold (born 14 August 1978) is a Canadian former professional road cyclist.

== Major results ==
2003
1st Stage 4 Tour of Wellington
1st Stage 1 Tour de White Rock
2005
1st Stage 4 Mount Hood Cycling Classic
2006
1st Overall Tour de Delta

1st Stage 2

1st Stage 6 Tour de Beauce
1st Stage 3 (TTT) Vuelta a El Salvador
2007
1st Stage 4 (TTT) Vuelta a El Salvador
2nd Overall Tour de Delta

1st Stage 3

5th U.S. Open Cycling Championships
2008
1st Gastown Grand Prix
1st Stage 6 Mount Hood Cycling Classic
1st Stage 2 Tour de Delta
2nd Overall Tour de White Rock

1st Stage 2

10th Lancaster Classic
2009
1st Overall Tour de White Rock

1st Stage 2

2nd Overall Tour de Delta

1st Stage 3

1st Stage 8 Vuelta Mexico
6th US Air Force Cycling Classic
10th Philadelphia International Championship
2010
2nd Historic Roswell Criterium
2011
1st Overall Tour de Delta
