= 2006 Tour of California =

UCI America Tour

Race details
- Dates: February 19–26, 2006
- Stages: 7+Prologue
- Distance: 700 mi (1,100 km)

Results
Jersey awarded to the overall winner	Winner	Floyd Landis (USA)	(Phonak)
	Second	David Zabriskie (USA)	(Team CSC)
	Third	Bobby Julich (USA)	(Team CSC)
Jersey awarded to the mountains classification winner	Mountains	Levi Leipheimer (USA)	(Gerolsteiner)
Jersey awarded to the young rider classification winner	Young rider	Tom Peterson (USA)	(TIAA–CREF)
Jersey awarded to the sprints classification winner	Sprints	Olaf Pollack (GER)	(T-Mobile Team)
	Team	Team CSC	

The 2006 Tour of California was the inaugural edition of the Tour of California, a professional road cycling stage race that made its debut on February 19, 2006. Sponsored by the biotechnology company Amgen, the eight-day, 700 miles (1,100 km) race started in San Francisco, winding its way down the California coast to finish in Redondo Beach. With eight of the twenty European UCI ProTour teams in attendance, the inaugural Tour of California proved to be one of the largest cycling races in the United States since the demise of the Coors Classic in 1988.

Among the professional cyclists in attendance were George Hincapie (Discovery Channel), Floyd Landis (Phonak), Chris Horner and Freddy Rodriguez (Davitamon–Lotto), Bobby Julich and Dave Zabriskie (Team CSC), Levi Leipheimer (Gerolsteiner), and Gilberto Simoni (Saunier Duval–Prodir).

== Stages of the 2006 Tour of California ==
=== San Francisco individual time trial ===
Bay Area resident Levi Leipheimer took the early lead in the Tour and secured the leader's golden jersey by winning the prologue time trial. His time of 4:53.43 put him ahead of second-place finisher Bobby Julich, who finished five seconds behind the leader. Americans swept the first five spots with George Hincapie finishing third, followed by Floyd Landis and David Zabriskie. The 1.9-mile (3.1 km) prologue began at San Francisco's Ferry Building and climbed up Telegraph Hill to finish at the base of Coit Tower.

=== Sausalito to Santa Rosa ===
Juan José Haedo won the stage after a mass sprint, ahead of veterans Olaf Pollack and Stuart O'Grady from the UCI ProTour teams T-Mobile Team and Team CSC. This was the first win for team Toyota-United Pro.

Gerolsteiner controlled the race, letting Jean Marc Marino (Crédit Agricole) and Jackson Stewart (Kodakgallery.Com-Sierra Nevada) escape, but keeping the time gap small enough to catch them before the finish.

Arriving in his hometown in the leader's golden jersey, Levi Leipheimer (Gerolsteiner) was greeted by tens of thousands of his fans. By finishing near the front of the main pack, he retained the jersey for the next day.

=== Martinez to San José ===
Mike Creed (TIAA-CREF) sprinted away from the field just nine miles (14 km) after the start. He was followed by Mads Kaggestad (Crédit Agricole) and Ben Jaques-Maynes (Kodak Gallery.com/Sierra Nevada). The three remained in front for the next 40 miles (64 km) or so, until they were caught by the peloton. Bernhard Kohl (T-Mobile) won the King of the Mountain for the day.

George Hincapie (Discovery Channel) won the stage and with the ten second time bonus took the lead from Levi Leipheimer (Gerolsteiner). This put Leipheimer in second place, four seconds behind Hincapie.

=== San José individual time trial ===
Floyd Landis won the time trial and took over the lead in the overall with a time of 35:58 for the 17-mile course, 26 seconds faster than second-place finisher David Zabriskie, whose time for the third stage was 36:24. Landis' outstanding performance allowed him to gain 55 seconds on George Hincapie and 1:16 over Levi Leipheimer, establishing overall gaps of 45 seconds and 1:10 respectively, which were never to change throughout the remainder of the tour.

=== Monterey to San Luis Obispo ===
The longest stage of the tour closed with a mass sprint in San Luis Obispo, with Juan José Haedo taking his second stage of the race. Floyd Landis maintained the overall lead.

=== San Luis Obispo to Santa Barbara ===
Another sprint to the finish line, and George Hincapie won his second ToC stage; however, the overall standings remained the same, with Floyd Landis holding on to the gold Leader's jersey. Hincapie did take the Sprinter's jersey while Levi Leipheimer, true to his strength, took the King of the Mountain jersey by collecting the first place points on the biggest climb of the stage, the category 1 climb of San Marcos Pass, 15 miles (24 km) from the finish. He was caught, however, on the downhill.

=== Santa Barbara to Thousand Oaks ===
This short stage was won following yet another sprint to the finish; this time, by Olaf Pollack of Team T-Mobile. Pollack finished in 3:26:39 to take his first stage win in a major race in about 18 months. Floyd Landis maintains a 29-second overall lead heading into the final stage, a 10-lap, 76.5-mile circuit race in Redondo Beach.

=== Redondo Beach circuit race ===
Olaf Pollack again won the stage and the green sprinter's jersey. Floyd Landis' lead proved insurmountable, giving him the golden jersey signifying the overall win in the inaugural Amgen Tour of California by 29 seconds. The second- through seventh-place finishers (Zabriskie, Julich, Hincapie, O'Neill, Leipheimer and Evans) all were less than 1:30 off the lead. Leipheimer won the King of the Mountain (orange) jersey. Team CSC (sponsored by the Danish subsidiary of the California-based Computer Sciences Corporation) took Best Team honors.

=== Final standings top ten riders ===
Overall	Name	Nationality	Team	Time
1	Floyd Landis	United States	Phonak	22 hr 46'46"
2	David Zabriskie	United States	Team CSC	0.29
3	Bobby Julich	United States	Team CSC	0.34
4	George Hincapie	United States	Discovery Channel	0.45
5	Nathan O'Neill	Australia	Health Net p/b Maxxis	1.08
6	Levi Leipheimer	United States	Gerolsteiner	1.10
7	Cadel Evans	Australia	Davitamon–Lotto	1.29
8	~~Tom Danielson~~	~~United States~~	~~Discovery Channel~~	~~1.49~~
9	Christian Vande Velde	United States	Team CSC	1.55
10	Jason McCartney	United States	Discovery Channel	1.58

== Jersey progress ==
Stage (Winner)	General Classification	Sprint Classification	Mountains Classification	Youth Classification	Team Classification	Most Aggressive
Prologue (Levi Leipheimer)	Levi Leipheimer	no award	Bernhard Kohl	Zachary Grabowski	Team CSC	no award
Stage 1 (Juan José Haedo)	Levi Leipheimer	Juan José Haedo	Bernhard Kohl	Zachary Grabowski	Jackson Stewart	
Stage 2 (George Hincapie)	George Hincapie	George Hincapie	Bernhard Kohl	Tom Peterson	Michael Creed	
Stage 3 (Floyd Landis)	Floyd Landis	George Hincapie	Bernhard Kohl	Tom Peterson	no award	
Stage 4 (Juan José Haedo)	Floyd Landis	Juan José Haedo	Bernhard Kohl	Tom Peterson	Lars Bak	
Stage 5 (George Hincapie)	Floyd Landis	George Hincapie	Levi Leipheimer	Tom Peterson	Nick Reistad	
Stage 6 (Olaf Pollack)	Floyd Landis	George Hincapie	Levi Leipheimer	Tom Peterson	Sebastian Lang	
Stage 7 (Olaf Pollack)	Floyd Landis	Olaf Pollack	Levi Leipheimer	Tom Peterson	Glen Chadwick	
Final	Floyd Landis	Olaf Pollack	Levi Leipheimer	Tom Peterson	Team CSC	

== Teams ==
- Discovery Channel
- Team CSC
- T-Mobile Team
- Phonak
- Gerolsteiner
- Saunier Duval–Prodir
- Davitamon–Lotto
- Crédit Agricole
- Health Net Pro Cycling Team Presented by Maxxis
- Navigators Insurance Pro Cycling Team
- Jelly Belly Pro Cycling Team
- Team TIAA-CREF
- Colavita Olive Oil / Sutter Home Winery Cycling Team
- KodakGallery.com / Sierra Nevada Pro Cycling Team
- KB Home Mexico National Team
- Toyota-United Pro Cycling Team
