= George Hincapie =

American cyclist (born 1973)

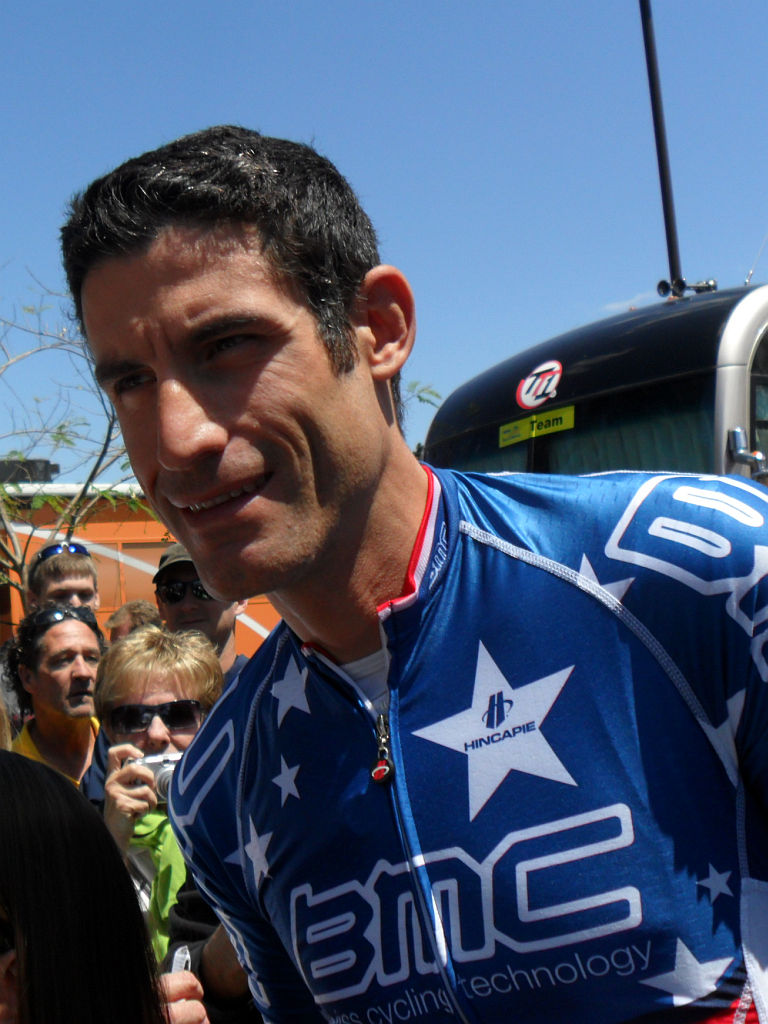
- Hincapie at the 2010 Tour of California

Personal information
- Full name: George Anthony Hincapie
- Nickname: Big George
- Born: June 29, 1973 (age 53) Queens, New York, US
- Height: 1.91 m (6 ft 3 in)
- Weight: 79 kg (174 lb; 12 st 6 lb)

Cycling career
- Sport: Cycling
- Current team: Modern Adventure Pro Cycling
- Discipline: Road
- Role: Rider (retired); Team manager
- Rider type: Classics specialist; Climbing domestique

Professional teams
- 1994–1996: Motorola
- 1997–2005: U.S. Postal Service
- 2005-2007: Discovery Channel
- 2008–2009: Team High Road
- 2010–2012: BMC Racing Team

Managerial teams
- 2012–2020: BMC–Hincapie Sportswear Team
- 2026–: Modern Adventure Pro Cycling

Major wins
- Grand Tours Tour de France 1 TTT stage (2003) Stage races Tour of Missouri (2007) Three Days of De Panne (2004) One-day races and classics National Road Race Championships (1998, 2006, 2009) Gent–Wevelgem (2001)

George Anthony Hincapie (born June 29, 1973) is an American former racing cyclist, who competed professionally between 1994 and 2012. Hincapie was a key domestique of Lance Armstrong. Hincapie was also a domestique for Alberto Contador in 2007 and for Cadel Evans in 2011, when both men won the Tour de France. He was the owner and general manager of UCI Professional Continental team Hincapie–Leomo p/b BMC until it folded at the end of the 2020 season. In 2025, Hincapie formed Modern Adventure Pro Cycling alongside his brother Richard.

On October 10, 2012, Hincapie released a statement on his website acknowledging the use of performance-enhancing drugs and confirming that he had been approached by US federal investigators and USADA about his experiences with doping. Later that day a statement was released confirming his acceptance of a six-month ban from September 1, 2012, ending on March 1, 2013, along with a stripping of all race results between May 31, 2004, and July 31, 2006.

Hincapie started a record 17 Tours, however, after his doping admission he was retroactively disqualified from the 2004, 2005 and 2006 Tours. The only Tour he started but did not finish was his first. He completed his 16th and final Tour in 2012, which tied Joop Zoetemelk's record of completed Tours. However, following the outcome of the Armstrong investigation, the record reverted to Zoetemelk. He also rode at five consecutive Olympic Games between 1992 and 2008.

== Early life ==
Hincapie was born in Queens, New York, United States. His father Ricardo, a native of Colombia, introduced him to cycling, and his first race training was in New York City's Central Park. He graduated from Farmingdale High School in Long Island in 1991.

== Cycling career ==
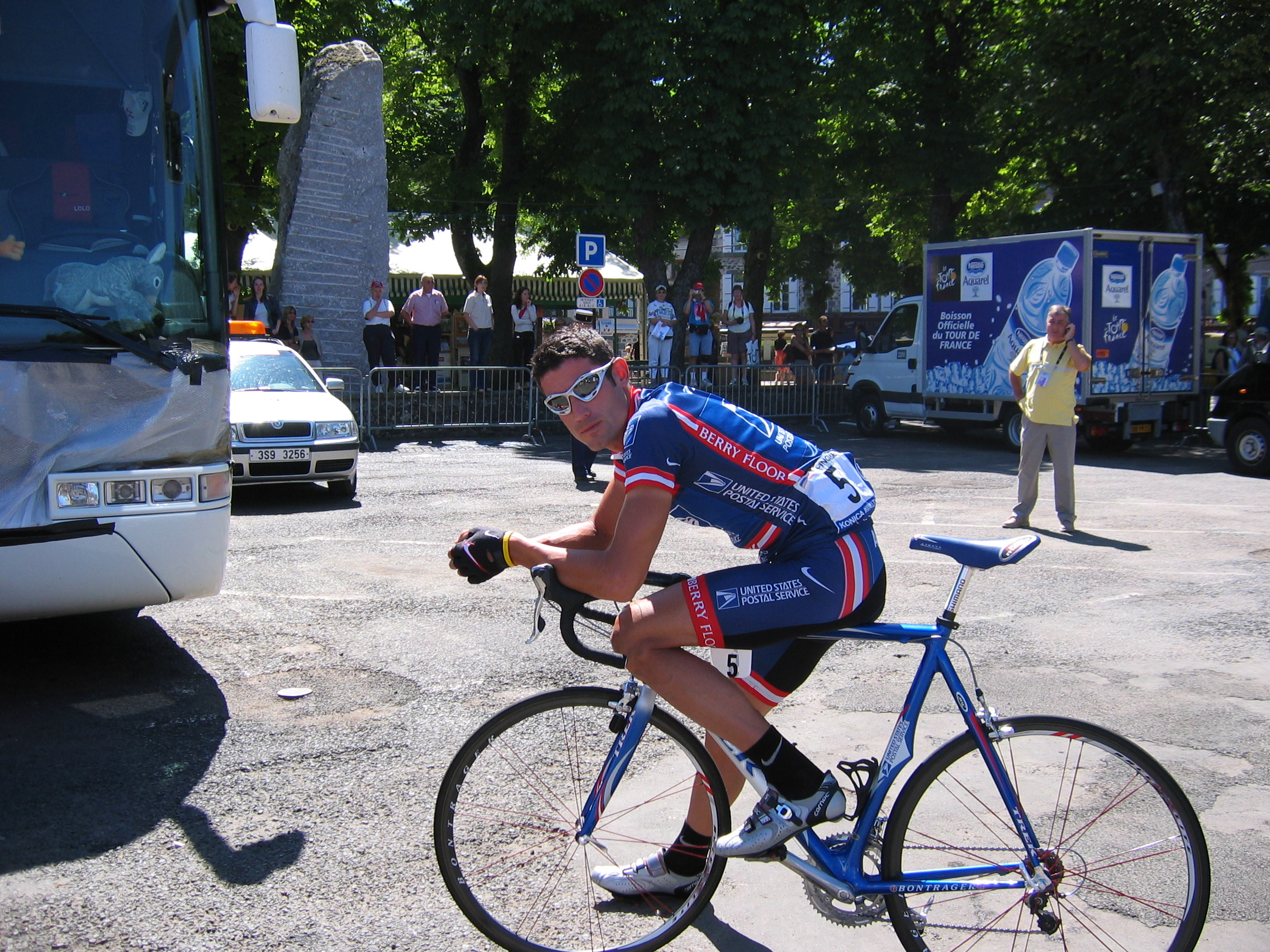
Hincapie at Saint-Flour during the 2004 Tour de France.

Hincapie has several important wins of his own, starting with Gent–Wevelgem in 2001 and Kuurne–Brussels–Kuurne in 2005. Also in 2005, Hincapie took two stage wins at the Critérium du Dauphiné and 2nd place at Paris–Roubaix. In 2005 he had his first stage win in the Tour de France where, on July 17, he finished seven seconds ahead of climber Óscar Pereiro to win Stage 15 from Lézat-sur-Lèze to Pla d'Adet. In January 2014, Pereiro acknowledged in a radio show that during the final climb, Hincapie turned his head and said 50,000, which Pereiro assumed was in Euros, although Hincapie was referring to U.S. dollars. Pereiro accepted the offer and sold the stage to Hincapie. The deal was closed some kilometers before arriving to the finish line. More recent victories include two stages at the Tour of California (2006), the overall and a stage at the Tour of Missouri (2007), and another stage win at the Critérium du Dauphiné in 2008. He is a three-time US Professional Road Race champion (1998, 2006, 2009).

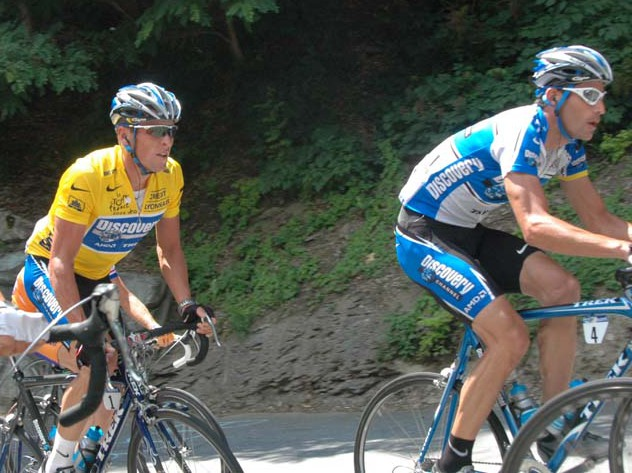
Hincapie (right) with Lance Armstrong (left) at the 2005 Tour de France

Throughout his career Hincapie has targeted the cobbled classics of April, specifically the week that begins with the Tour of Flanders, continues mid-week with Gent–Wevelgem, and ends with Paris–Roubaix. He achieved his highest position on the podium with his 2001 victory in Gent–Wevelgem. His 2nd-place finish in the 2005 Paris-Roubaix remains the highest placing in that race by an American.

His many top 10 placings in these races include 3rd, 4th, 5th, 6th (twice), 7th, and 10th in various Tour of Flanders; 3rd, 4th (three times), and 5th in Gent–Wevelgem, in addition to his victory; and 2nd, 4th (twice), 6th (twice), 8th, and 9th in Paris–Roubaix. While using Three Days of De Panne as a warm-up ride during the previous week, he has placed well in that race also, winning the overall in 2004 and placing third overall in 2002.

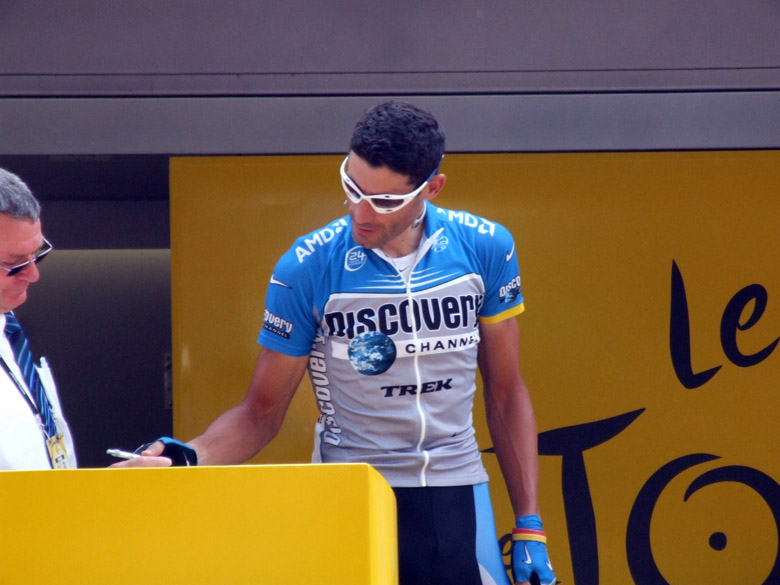
Hincapie signing in at Tarbes during the 2006 Tour de France

In 2005, Hincapie showed a talent for short individual time trials (ITTs), winning the prologue at the 2005 Critérium du Dauphiné Libéré, placing second three times and third once in prologues in 2006 (including at the Tour de France), and placing second in the short ITT at Three Days of De Panne. In the 2006 Paris–Roubaix, bad luck struck Hincapie in the cobbled sector of Mons-en-Pévèle, when the steerer tube of his Trek bicycle snapped, leaving him dangling with no handlebars and crashing heavily. He was near the lead group but had to abandon the race. He later won the ITT at the Eneco Tour of Benelux in 2006 and placed fourth in two longer ITTs that year. He finished third in the prologue at the 2007 Tour de France and second in the prologue at the Volta a Catalunya in 2008.

Hincapie rode for Team Columbia in the 2008 and 2009 seasons, departing Discovery Channel Pro Cycling Team shortly before it disbanded. He is easily distinguished from the pack by his large size (1.91 m (6 ft 3 in)). His contract with the team expired after the 2009 season, and though there was talk of him joining Armstrong's new Team RadioShack, Hincapie signed with BMC Racing Team for the 2010 season.

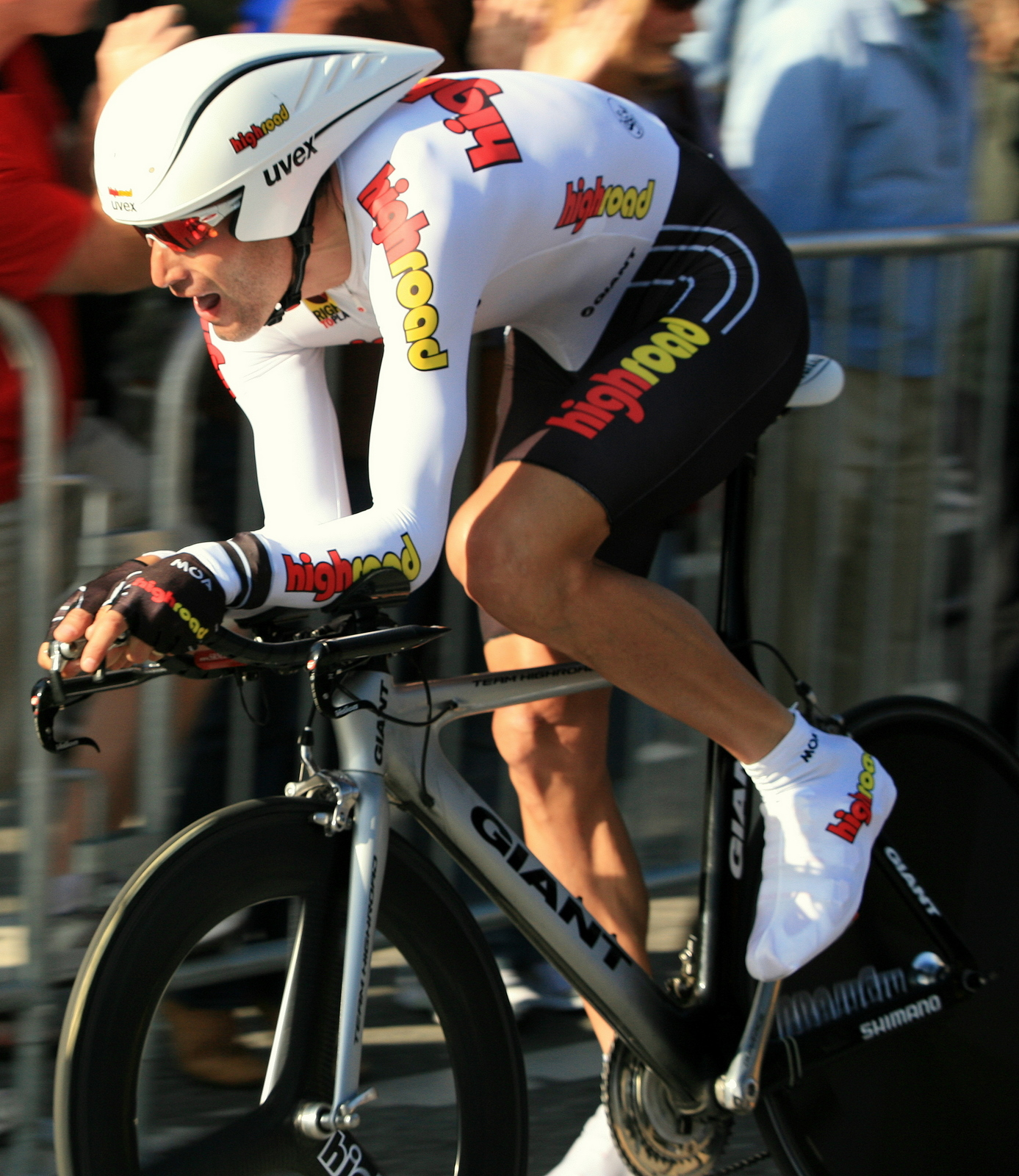
Hincapie in the Prologue of the 2008 Tour of California

In 2012 he established the BMC–Hincapie Sportswear Team, initially with support from BMC. He also set a record by completing his 17th Tour of Flanders, surpassing Briek Schotte. On June 11, Hincapie announced that he would retire at the end of the season, after 19 years in the professional peloton. On June 30, Hincapie started a record 17th Tour de France. He was allowed to lead the race onto the Champs-Élysées as this was his final Tour de France. In August, Hincapie announced that he had raced in his last event, the USA Pro Cycling Challenge. In his own words: “It's been a long career for me, a good career and I'm proud of it. I'm sad to leave, but at the same time, I'm excited to spend more time with my family and start a new life.” He also said that he didn't plan to terminate all his relations with cycling. Following his retirement, Hincapie opened a boutique hotel and high-end restaurant in Travelers Rest, South Carolina with his brother.

In March, 2017, Hincapie turned to mountain biking and competed in the Masters category at the eight-day Absa Cape Epic stage race in South Africa over 641 km. The race is held in a two-person team format and Hincapie and partner Cadel Evans – reunited after Hincapie helped Evans to win the 2011 Tour de France – won the category.

== Doping ==
On October 10, 2012, Hincapie announced on his website that he had used banned substances at times in his career. The statement reads in part:

"Because of my love for the sport, the contributions I feel I have made to it, and the amount the sport of cycling has given to me over the years, it is extremely difficult today to acknowledge that during a part of my career I used banned substances. Early in my professional career, it became clear to me that, given the widespread use of performance-enhancing drugs by cyclists at the top of the profession, it was not possible to compete at the highest level without them. I deeply regret that choice and sincerely apologize to my family, teammates and fans."

—

The statement came as the U.S. Anti-Doping agency announced plans to release documents related to doping accusations against Lance Armstrong, a former teammate of Hincapie.

== Career achievements ==
=== Major results ===
1990
7th Road race, UCI Road World Junior Championships
1992
1st Team time trial, National Road Championships
1994 (2 pro wins)
2nd Overall Tour de Luxembourg

1st Points classification
1st Stages 1 & 4

4th Classic Haribo
1995
1st Acht van Chaam
3rd Reading Classic
10th Philadelphia International Championship
1997 (1)
1st Stage 1 Setmana Catalana de Ciclisme
5th Reading Classic
1998 (2)
1st Road race, National Road Championships
1st Philadelphia International Championship
2nd Reading Classic
5th Lancaster Classic
1999 (2)
1st Reading Classic
1st Stage 6 PruTour
1st Points classification, Tour de Luxembourg
3rd Lancaster Classic
4th Gent–Wevelgem
4th Paris–Roubaix
5th HEW Cyclassics
9th Milan–San Remo
9th Philadelphia International Championship
2000
3rd Reading Classic
4th Trofeo Luis Puig
5th Philadelphia International Championship
6th Paris–Roubaix
7th Lancaster Classic
8th Road race, Olympic Games
2001 (2)
1st Gent–Wevelgem
1st San Francisco Grand Prix
2nd Lancaster Classic
3rd Overall Tour de Picardie
3rd Philadelphia International Championship
4th Paris–Roubaix
9th Milan–San Remo
2002
1st Stage 1 (TTT) Volta Ciclista a Catalunya
2nd Classic Haribo
3rd Overall Volta ao Algarve
3rd Gent–Wevelgem
4th Tour of Flanders
5th HEW Cyclassics
5th Philadelphia International Championship
6th Paris–Roubaix
9th Lancaster Classic
2003
1st Stage 4 (TTT) Tour de France
7th Overall Tour of Belgium
2004 (1)
1st Overall Three Days of De Panne
4th Gent–Wevelgem
5th Overall Paris–Nice
8th Paris–Roubaix
10th Tour of Flanders

Voided results from May 31, 2004, to July 31, 2006.

2004
~~1st Stage 4 (TTT) Tour de France~~
~~3rd San Francisco Grand Prix~~
~~5th Grand Prix Eddy Merckx~~
2005
~~1st Kuurne–Brussels–Kuurne~~
~~1st GP Ouest–France~~
~~Tour de France~~

~~1st Stages 4 & 15~~

~~Critérium du Dauphiné Libéré~~

~~1st Stages 1 & 7~~

~~2nd Paris–Roubaix~~
~~6th Brabantse Pijl~~
~~7th Tour of Flanders~~
2006
~~3rd Tour of Flanders~~
~~4th Overall Tour of California~~

~~1st Stages 2 & 5~~

~~5th Gent–Wevelgem~~
~~8th Overall Tirreno–Adriatico~~
~~Tour de France~~

~~Held after Stages 1–2~~

2006 (2)
1st Road race, National Road Championships
2nd Overall Eneco Tour

1st Stage 4 (ITT)

9th Clásica de San Sebastián
2007 (2)
1st Overall Tour of Missouri

1st Stage 2

2nd Road race, National Road Championships
2008 (2)
1st Stage 2 Critérium du Dauphiné Libéré
1st Stage 7 Tour of California
4th Overall Tour of Missouri
5th Tour of Flanders
9th Paris–Roubaix
9th Overall Three Days of De Panne
2009 (1)
1st Road race, National Road Championships
8th E3 Prijs Vlaanderen
2010
4th Gent–Wevelgem
6th Tour of Flanders
2011 (1)
2nd Road race, National Road Championships
5th Overall USA Pro Cycling Challenge

1st Stage 2

6th Tour of Flanders
2017
1st Overall Masters Cape Epic (with Cadel Evans)

=== Grand Tour general classification results timeline ===
Grand Tour	1995	1996	1997	1998	1999	2000	2001	2002	2003	2004	2005	2006	2007	2008	2009	2010	2011	2012
Giro d'Italia	—	—	—	—	—	—	—	—	—	—	—	—	DNF	—	—	—	—	—
Tour de France	—	DNF	104	53	78	65	71	59	47	~~33~~	~~13~~	~~32~~	24	35	17	59	56	38
Vuelta a España	110	—	—	—	—	—	—	—	DNF	—	—	—	—	—	—	—	—	—

=== Classics results timeline ===
Monument	1994	1995	1996	1997	1998	1999	2000	2001	2002	2003	2004	2005	2006	2007	2008	2009	2010	2011	2012
Milan–San Remo	—	133	77	47	46	9	DNF	9	16	—	13	—	—	—	42	39	55	22	33
Tour of Flanders	54	32	52	23	17	21	17	13	4	—	10	~~7~~	~~3~~	—	5	34	6	6	52
Paris–Roubaix	31	21	29	59	OTL	4	6	4	6	—	8	~~2~~	~~DNF~~	—	9	44	29	42	43
Liège–Bastogne–Liège	—	—	—	—	—	—	—	—	20	—	—	—	—	—	—	—	—	—	—
Giro di Lombardia	Did not contest during career																		
Classic	1994	1995	1996	1997	1998	1999	2000	2001	2002	2003	2004	2005	2006	2007	2008	2009	2010	2011	2012
Omloop Het Nieuwsblad	21	27	42	—	—	—	—	—	DNF	DNF	—	~~30~~	—	—	—	—	67	—	—
Kuurne–Brussels–Kuurne	13	11	—	—	—	—	—	—	—	22	33	~~1~~	—	—	—	—	—	—	—
Dwars door Vlaanderen	49	—	—	—	—	—	—	—	—	—	—	—	—	—	—	—	—	—	—
E3 Harelbeke	37	—	75	—	—	—	—	—	—	—	—	~~DNF~~	—	—	—	8	—	—	DNF
Gent–Wevelgem	54	52	16	—	69	4	26	1	3	—	4	~~DNF~~	~~5~~	—	53	16	4	30	51
Brabantse Pijl	—	—	—	—	—	—	—	—	—	—	—	~~6~~	—	—	—	—	—	—	—
Clásica de San Sebastián	51	—	—	—	—	131	59	73	—	15	~~56~~	~~37~~	9	—	—	—	—	—	—
HEW Cyclassics	—	—	—	—	54	5	—	—	5	49	—	—	—	—	—	—	—	—	—
GP Ouest–France	—	—	—	—	—	—	—	—	—	—	—	~~1~~	—	—	—	—	—	—	—

Legend
—	Did not compete
DNF	Did not finish
NH	Not held
~~Struck~~	Voided result

== Personal ==
He is married to former runway model and Tour de France podium girl Melanie Simonneau, with whom he has three children: a daughter and two sons. Hincapie resides in Greenville, South Carolina.

Sporting positions
Preceded by Bart Bowen	United States National Road Race Championships; Winner; 1998	Succeeded by Marty Jemison
Preceded by Chris Wherry	United States National Road Race Championships; Winner; 2006	Succeeded by Levi Leipheimer
Preceded by Tyler Hamilton	United States National Road Race Championships; Winner; 2009	Succeeded by Ben King
