= Stefano Barberi =

Brazilian-American racing cyclist

Personal information
- Born: March 27, 1984 (age 42) São Paulo, Brazil

Cycling career
- Sport: Cycling
- Disciplines: Road; Mountain; Gravel
- Role: Rider

Amateur teams
- 2011: Full Circle Sports
- 2012: CashCall Mortgage
- 2013–2015: California Giant–Specialized
- 2016–2018: Support Clean Sport–Sea Sucker–Guttenplan Coaching

Professional teams
- 2005: TIAA–CREF
- 2006–2007: Toyota–United
- 2010: Kenda–Gear Grinder

Stefano Barberi (born March 27, 1984) is a Brazilian/American professional mountain bike and gravel racer, and former professional road bicycle racer. He resides in Reno, Nevada with his wife Katie Barberi and son Micheli Barberi. He was born in São Paulo.

== Major results ==
2005
6th Overall Tour of Puerto Rico
2008
3rd Overall Tour of Pennsylvania
2015
1st Stage 2 Nature Valley Grand Prix
