= Danny Pate =

American racing cyclist

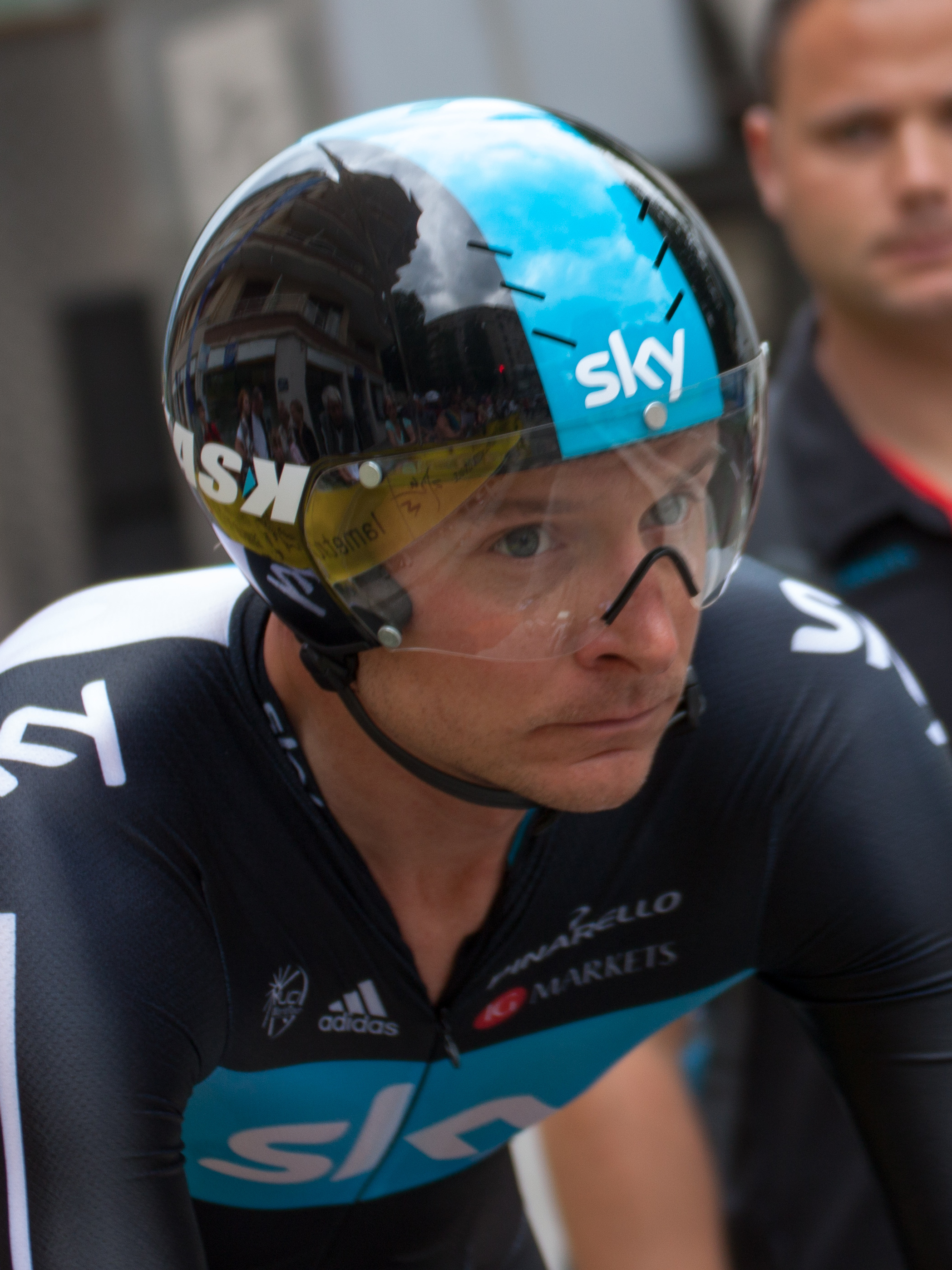
- Pate at the 2012 Critérium du Dauphiné

Personal information
- Full name: Danny Pate
- Born: March 23, 1979 (age 47) Colorado Springs, Colorado, United States
- Height: 1.85 m (6 ft 1 in)
- Weight: 73 kg (161 lb; 11.5 st)

Cycling career
- Sport: Cycling
- Current team: Retired
- Disciplines: Road; Mountain biking; Cyclo-cross
- Role: Rider
- Rider type: Rouleur

Amateur teams
- 1998: Colorado–Ikon–Lexus
- 1999: Tomac–Manitou MTB

Professional teams
- 2000: Saeco–Valli & Valli
- 2001–2003: Prime Alliance Cycling Team
- 2004: Health Net–Maxxis
- 2005: Jelly Belly–Pool Gel
- 2006–2010: TIAA–CREF
- 2011: HTC–Highroad
- 2012–2015: Team Sky
- 2016–2018: Rally Cycling

Major wins
- Grand Tours Giro d'Italia 2 TTT stages (2008, 2013) One-day races and Classics World Under-23 Time Trial Championships (2001) National Under-23 Road Race Championships (1998)
Medal record
Representing United States
Men's road bicycle racing
UCI Road World Championships
Gold medal – first place	2001 Lisbon	Under-23 time trial

Danny Pate (born March 23, 1979) is an American retired professional cyclist, who competed professionally in road racing, cyclo-cross and mountain bike racing between 2000 and 2018 for the Saeco–Valli & Valli, Prime Alliance, Health Net–Maxxis, Jelly Belly–Pool Gel, Garmin–Transitions, HTC–Highroad, Team Sky and Rally Cycling teams.

== Career ==
Born in Colorado Springs, Colorado, Pate took his only professional victory at the 2007 Tour of Missouri, winning the penultimate stage.

He made his first start at both the Giro d'Italia and the Tour de France in 2008. In the latter, he was part of the breakaway on the fifteenth stage with three other riders, and was still clear with Simon Gerrans and Egoi Martínez heading into the final kilometre of the stage, an uphill finish to Prato Nevoso in Italy. He was out-sprinted by Gerrans and Martínez, sitting up for a third-place stage finish. He took a further third-place Grand Tour stage finish at the following year's Giro d'Italia, this time as part of a 25-rider breakaway; he was out-sprinted by Michele Scarponi and Félix Cárdenas at the finish in Benevento.

In October 2015 the UCI Continental team Rally Cycling, then named Optum–Kelly Benefit Strategies, announced that Pate would join them for the 2016 season after four years with Team Sky, reuniting him with former Prime Alliance teammate and Optum performance director Jonas Carney. He retired from racing at the 2018 Colorado Classic, after finishing the last stage in Denver.

== Major results ==
1997
1st Junior race, National Cyclo-cross Championships
1998
1st Road race, National Under-23 Road Championships
2000
9th Rund um die Nürnberger Altstadt
2001
1st Time trial, UCI Under-23 Road World Championships
1st Overall Triptyque Ardennais
2nd Ronde van Vlaanderen U23
8th La Côte Picarde
9th Overall Sea Otter Classic
9th Prix de la Ville de Soissons
2002
1st Overall International Tour de Toona
1st Lake Eola Criterium
2nd Road race, National Road Championships
3rd Overall Tour of the Gila
3rd USPRO Championships
5th Overall GP de Beauce
2003
1st Stage 2 Tour de White Rock
4th Overall GP de Beauce
2004
3rd Road race, National Road Championships
2005
1st Mountains classification Nature Valley Grand Prix
2nd Road race, National Road Championships
2nd USPRO Championships
6th Overall Redlands Bicycle Classic
7th Overall International Cycling Classic

1st Stages 3 & 15

9th San Francisco Grand Prix
2006
2nd Overall Rás Tailteann

1st Stage 2

3rd Road race, National Road Championships
3rd Overall Tour de Beauce

1st Stage 4 (ITT)

3rd Reading Classic (Pro Cycling Tour)
6th Lancaster Classic
9th Overall Tour du Limousin
10th Overall Tour de l'Ain
2007
1st Stage 5 Tour of Missouri
2nd Time trial, National Road Championships
3rd Overall Tour de Beauce
4th Lancaster Classic
2008
1st Stage 1 (TTT) Giro d'Italia
1st Stage 4 (TTT) Tour de Georgia
3rd Road race, National Road Championships
2009
3rd Overall Critérium International
5th Overall Tour Méditerranéen
2010
10th Gran Premio Nobili Rubinetterie – Coppa Papà Carlo
2013
1st Stage 2 (TTT) Giro d'Italia
1st Stage 1b (TTT) Giro del Trentino
2015
1st Stage 1 (TTT) Tour de Romandie
