= Iván Domínguez =

Cuban cyclist (born 1976)

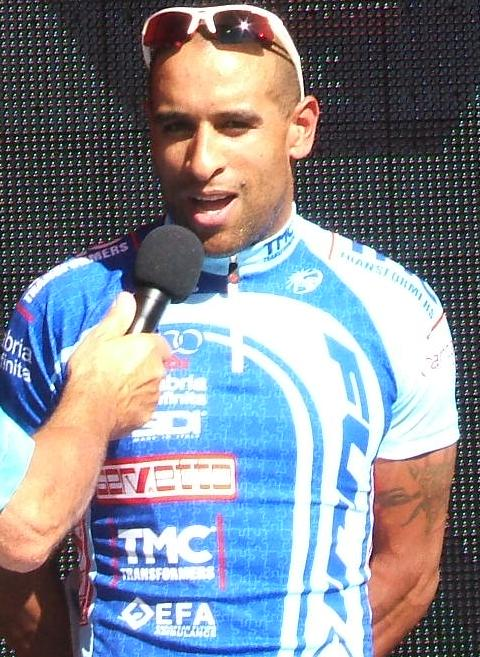

Personal information
- Full name: Iván Domínguez
- Born: May 28, 1976 (age 50) United States; Cuba

Cycling career
- Sport: Cycling
- Discipline: Road
- Role: Rider

Professional teams
- 2001–2003: Saturn
- 2004: Colavita-Olive Oil
- 2005: Health Net presented by Maxxis
- 2006–2008: Toyota-United
- 2009: Fuji–Servetto
- 2009–2010: Rock Racing
- 2010-2011: Jamis-Sutter Home

Major wins
- Tour Of Georgia, 1 Stage win (2008) Tour of California, 1 Stage win (2007) Tour of Missouri, 2 Stages win (2007) Overall USA Criterium Series, 1st Place (2006) CSC Invitational, 1st Place (2005) New York City Cycling Championship, 1st Place (2001) Cuban National Champion, 4K Individual Pursuit, 1st Place (1997) Pan am Games, 4K Individual Pursuit, 1st Place (1997) Pan am Games, Madison, 1st Place (1996)

Iván Domínguez (born May 28, 1976 in Havana) is a Cuban/USA professional road cyclist. In 2009, Domínguez, also known as "The Cuban Missile," acquired U.S. citizenship.

Domínguez initially competed for the Cuban National Track and Road Team, where he achieved a Pan-American Gold Medal in 1997. He defected to the United States in 1998 at the Goodwill Games in NY. Settling in Miami with family members and friends. Despite facing language barriers and working in a Clothing Factory, he gradually gained success in local cycling races.

His return to high-level competition began in 2000 when he joined the elite amateur Cycle Science (FL) racing team. Built around him, the small team embarked on extensive tours across the country, traveling from Florida to California, New England, and back to Wisconsin before he secured his first professional contract in August.

Domínguez turned professional in 2001 with the Saturn Professional Cycling Team. Subsequently, he rode for Colavita Olive Oil, Health Net, Toyota-United, Fuji-Servetto, Rock Racing and Jamis Sutter Home.

A renowned sprinter, Domínguez was widely regarded as one of the best in America. He showcased his exceptional speed by winning Stage 7 of the 2007 Tour of California, Tour of Georgia and Tour of Missouri.

== Track Results ==
2002
1st, New York City Cycling Championship (NY)
1997
1st, Cuban National Champion, 4km Pursuit
2nd, Pan Am Games, 4km Team Pursuit
1996
1st, Pan Am Games, Madison

== Major results ==
2008
Tour de Georgia

1st Overall after 1st Stage
1st, Stage #1

2007
1st, USA Crits World Criterium Championship
1st, Stage #1 Tour of Missouri
1st, Stage #6 Tour of Missouri
1st, Sprint Competition Tour of Missouri
1st, Stage #3 Tour of Elk Grove
1st, Hanes Park Classic
1st, Wells Fargo Twilight Criterium
1st, Stage #4 Cascade Cycling Classic
1st, Stage #1 Joe Martin Stage Race
1st, Indio Grand Prix
1st, Garrett Lemire Memorial Grand Prix
1st, Quand Knopf Sequia Cycling Classic Criterium
1st, Merco Credit Union Cycling Classic Down Town Grand Prix
1st, Stage #7 Amgen Tour of California
1st, Roger Milliken Memorial Criterium
1st, Red Trolley Classic Criterium
2nd, Chris Thater Memorial
2nd, Stage #1 TTT International Tour de Toona
2nd, Chevron Manhatton Beach Grand Prix
3rd, Stage #4 Tour of Missouri
3rd, Merco Credit Union Cycling Classic Road Race
4th, Overall Tour of Elk Grove
4th, Stage #2 International Tour de Toona
4th, Stage #7 Tour de Georgia
5th, Stage #6 Tour de Georgia
5th, Stage #1 Tour de Georgia
7th, Stage #2 Tour of Elk Grove
8th, Stage #4 International Tour de Toona
8th, Stage #2 Amgen Tour of California
9th, Stage #4 Joe Martin Stage Race
10th, Infineon Cougar Mountain Classic Criterium
2006
1st, Men’s Pro 1/2 International Challenge (Downers Grove, IL)
1st, Walterboro Criterium
1st, Greenwood Criterium
1st, Overall USA Crit Series
2nd, Commerce Bank Philadelphia International Championship
2nd, Stage#1 Tri-Peaks Challenge
2nd, Sunny King Criterium
2nd, Historic Roswell Criterium
2nd, McLane Pacific Foothills Road Race
2nd, Central Valley Classic Criterium
3rd, Stage #2 Fitchburg Longsjo Classic
3rd, Overall Tri-Peaks Challenge
4th, Stage #1 Vuelta a Valencia Stage Race (Valencia, CA)
6th, Spartanburg Criterium
8th, Athens Twilight
9th, CapTech Classic
2005
1st, CSC Invitational (Arlington, VA)
1st, Stage #3, San Dimas Stage Race
1st, Stage #4, Vuelta Ciclista Independencia (Dominican Republic)
1st, Stage #5, Vuelta Ciclista Independencia (Dominican Republic)
2nd, Central Valley Classic Kearney Park Circuit Race
2nd, Central Valley Classic Tower District Criterium
2nd, Athens Twilight Criterium
3rd, Historic Roswell Criterium
3rd, Wachovia Invitational (Lancaster, PA)
2004
1st, Bank of America Invitational (Charlotte, NC)
1st, Stage #3 Tour of Connecticut
1st, Stage #1 GP de Beauce (Quebec)
1st, Stage #3 Redlands Cycling Classic (CA)
2nd, Points Competition Dodge Tour de Georgia
2nd, Stage #1 Dodge Tour de Georgia
2nd, Stage #2 Dodge Tour de Georgia
2nd, Stage #3 Dodge Tour de Georgia
3rd, Stage #4 Redlands Bicycle Classic
3rd, Stage #2 Valley of the Sun stage race
2003
1st, Festival of Speed (FL)
1st, Stage #4 Vuelta a Sinaloa (Sinaloa, Mexico)
2002
1st, New York City Cycling Championships (NY, NY)
1st, Stage #4 Fitchburg Longsjo Classic (Fitchburg, MA)
2nd, Sequoia Cycling Classic Criterium (Visalia, CA)
4th, Sequoia Cycling Classic Road Race (Exeter, CA)
2001
1st, PYA / Monarch Criterium
1st, Solano Bicycle Classic Circuit Race (CA)
3rd, McClane Pacific Classic Grand Prix
3rd, Sequoia Cycling Classic Downtown Criterium
3rd, Sequoia Cycling Classic Rocky Hill Road Race
2000
1st, Sunshine Cycling Classic
