= USA Pro Cycling Challenge =

American road cycling race

Race details
- Region: USA
- Nickname(s): USA Pro Challenge, America's Race
- Discipline: Road race
- Competition: UCI America Tour 2.HC
- Type: Stage race
- Organiser: Medalist Sports LLC
- Race director: Jim Birrell
- Web site: www.usaprocyclingchallenge.com

History
- First edition: 2011
- Editions: 5
- Final edition: 2015
- First winner: Levi Leipheimer (USA)
- Most wins: Tejay van Garderen (USA) (2 wins)
- Final winner: Rohan Dennis (AUS)

The USA Pro Cycling Challenge, also known as USA Pro Challenge, was an annual multi-day professional road bicycle racing stage race that first took place in Colorado in 2011. Originally announced on August 4, 2010 by Colorado Governor Bill Ritter and Lance Armstrong as the Quiznos Pro Challenge, the event carried on the state's cycling legacy, which was most notably highlighted by the Coors Classic that ran from 1980 to 1988. On February 4, 2011 Richard E. Schaden, former owner of Quiznos and the event's co-chairman, announced the investment of an initial $10 million to secure the initial growth and longevity of the race. The USA Pro Cycling Challenge was one of only three current 2.HC rated races in the United States (along with the Tour of California, and the Tour of Utah), and was considered one of the most important pro cycling races in the U.S. After the 2015 edition, Schaden was unable to find a title sponsor for the 2016 edition, and subsequently left as an investor. The organizers were hoping to find a new investor to bring the race back for a 2017 edition, but the race folded after the 2015 edition.

- Distance: 992 km

== Winners ==
Year	Country	Rider	Team
2011	United States	Levi Leipheimer	Team RadioShack
2012	United States	Christian Vande Velde	Garmin–Sharp
2013	United States	Tejay van Garderen	BMC Racing Team
2014	United States	Tejay van Garderen	BMC Racing Team
2015	Australia	Rohan Dennis	BMC Racing Team

== History ==
=== 2011 edition ===
In 2011, the event took place between August 22–28, 2011 and featured 16 professional cycling teams consisting of 135 riders; including the top three riders of the 2011 Tour de France: Cadel Evans, Andy Schleck and Fränk Schleck. Riders traveled 518 miles and climbed 36,250 total feet at altitudes of upwards of 12,000 feet during the seven days of competition.

The race received 25 hours of national television airtime on Versus and the NBC Sports Network and was seen by over one million people worldwide. On-air commentary was provided by Tour de France announcers Paul Sherwen, Phil Liggett and Bob Roll.

Americans swept the podium, with Levi Leipheimer winning the race, Christian Vande Velde finishing second, and Tejay van Garderen finishing third.

=== 2012 edition ===
For 2012, the 683-mile race featured 42,000 feet of climbing, nine mountain passes (three of which exceed 12,000 feet), and three mountain top finishes. Four new cities joined the 2012 race including Durango, Telluride, Montrose and Boulder. The race was held from August 20–26 and featured an Individual Time Trial on the final day of racing in Denver. The race has received a 2.HC from the UCI (French: Hors categorie; English: beyond categorization), the highest rating for a continental tour stage race.

Similar to the first edition, Americans swept the podium, with Christian Vande Velde winning the race, Tejay van Garderen finishing second, and Levi Leipheimer finishing third.

=== 2013 edition ===
The race took place from August 19–25, 2013. It began in Aspen, wound its way through the Rocky Mountains at heights of up to 12,000 feet (3,700 m), and finished in the streets of downtown Denver.

American Tejay van Garderen of CCC Pro Team won the overall title after finishing lower on the podium the previous two years. Mathias Frank of CCC Pro Team finished second, becoming the first non-American to finish on the podium, while Tom Danielson of EF Education–EasyPost finished third.

== See also ==
- Colorado Classic, Colorado cycling race held for both men and women in 2017 and 2018; becomes a women-only event from 2019 forward
- Coors Classic, Colorado cycling race held from 1980-1988
