= 2001 Gent–Wevelgem =

Race details
- Dates: 11 April 2001
- Stages: 1
- Distance: 214 km (133 mi)
- Winning time: 5h 00' 50"

Results
	Winner	George Hincapie (USA)	(U.S. Postal Service)
	Second	Léon van Bon (NED)	(Mercury–Viatel)
	Third	Steffen Wesemann (GER)	(Team Telekom)

The 63rd edition of the Belgian Gent–Wevelgem cycling classic race was held over 214 kilometres from Gent to Wevelgem, on Wednesday 11 April 2001. There were 187 competitors, of whom 72 finished. It was won by George Hincapie of the US Postal Service team.

== Final classification ==
Rank	Rider	Team	Time
1	George Hincapie (USA)	U.S. Postal Service	5h 00' 50"
2	Léon van Bon (NED)	Mercury–Viatel	s.t.
3	Steffen Wesemann (GER)	Team Telekom	s.t.
4	Arvis Piziks (LAT)	CSC–Tiscali	s.t.
5	Nico Mattan (BEL)	Cofidis	s.t.
6	Niko Eeckhout (BEL)	Lotto–Adecco	+ 41"
7	Chris Peers (BEL)	Cofidis	s.t.
8	Daniele Nardello (ITA)	Mapei–Quick-Step	+ 1' 00"
9	Erik Zabel (GER)	Team Telekom	+ 1' 16"
10	Gabriele Balducci (ITA)	Tacconi Sport–Vini Caldirola	s.t.
