= Levi Leipheimer =

American cyclist (born 1973)

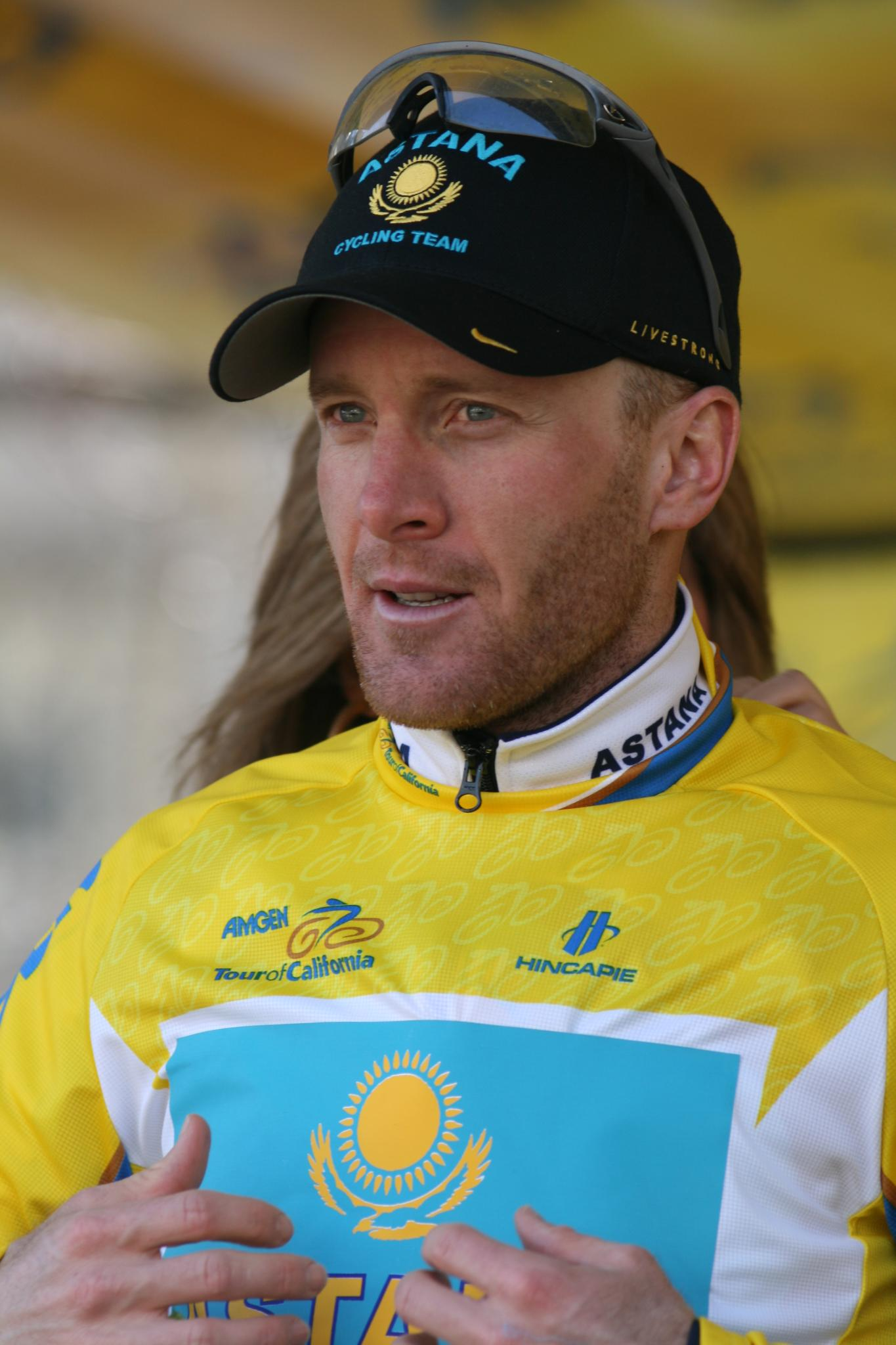
- Leipheimer at the 2009 Tour of California

Personal information
- Full name: Levi Leipheimer
- Born: October 24, 1973 (age 52) Butte, Montana, U.S.
- Height: 1.69 m (5 ft 7 in)
- Weight: 62 kg (137 lb; 9.8 st)

Cycling career
- Sport: Cycling
- Current team: Retired
- Discipline: Road
- Role: Rider
- Rider type: All-rounder

Amateur teams
- 1995: F.S. Maestro – Frigas
- 1996: Einstein

Professional teams
- 1997: Comptel – Colorado Cyclist
- 1998–1999: Saturn
- 2000–2001: U.S. Postal Service
- 2002–2004: Rabobank
- 2005–2006: Gerolsteiner
- 2007: Discovery Channel
- 2008–2009: Astana
- 2010–2011: Team RadioShack
- 2012: Omega Pharma–Quick-Step

Major wins
- Grand Tours Tour de France 1 TTT stage (2009) Vuelta a España 2 individual stages (2008) Stage races Tour of California (2007, 2008, 2009) Tour de Suisse (2011) One-day races and Classics National Road Race Championships (2007) National Time Trial Championships (1999)
Medal record
Representing United States
Men's road bicycle racing
Olympic Games
Bronze medal – third place	2008 Beijing	Men's Road Time Trial

Levi Leipheimer (born October 24, 1973) is an American former professional road racing cyclist. He was twice US national champion, winning the time trial title in 1999 and the road race in 2007, and is an Olympic medalist. Leipheimer was born and raised in Butte, Montana and resides in Santa Rosa, California. He is the patron of the widely attended King Ridge GranFondo, a mass participation ride in Sonoma County.

Leipheimer's major career accomplishments include winning the 2007, 2008 and 2009 editions of the Tour of California, the 2011 Tour de Suisse and the 2011 USA Pro Cycling Challenge. His Grand Tour results include 2nd in the 2008 Vuelta a España, and 4th in the 2009 Giro d'Italia. Leipheimer won the bronze medal in the time trial at the 2008 Summer Olympics in Beijing.

The United States Anti-Doping Agency (USADA) announced in October 2012 that Leipheimer would be suspended for his involvement in doping while riding for U.S. Postal Service, Rabobank, Gerolsteiner and Astana. Leipheimer accepted a 6-month ban from September 1, 2012, to March 1, 2013, and was stripped of all race results from June 1, 1999, to July 30, 2006, and July 7 to 29, 2007. (This included his third-place finish in the 2007 Tour.)

In May 2013, Leipheimer confirmed his retirement from professional cycling following the termination of his contract with Omega Pharma-Quickstep.

== Early life and amateur career ==
Leipheimer was born and raised in Butte, Montana, where his parents ran a sporting goods store. As a youth, his main sport was skiing, but he became interested in cycling after a skiing accident led to him directing his career hopes towards cycling.

=== Maestro Frigas and Einstein (1995–1996) ===
In 1995 Leipheimer won the Tour of Namur as an intern for the British F.S. Maestro – Frigas team.

==== 1996 doping violation ====
Leipheimer, riding for Team Einstein, won the 1996 U.S. National Criterium Championships in Grandview Heights, Ohio, but tested positive for ephedrine, a banned substance. He eventually forfeited his title, prize money and national champion's jersey as well as receiving a three-month suspension. Leipheimer's family later claimed that the positive test was not indicative of doping, but rather, the result of his taking allergy medicine Claritin-D to relieve hay fever.

== Professional career ==
=== Astana (2008–2009) ===
Leipheimer joined Astana, managed by Johan Bruyneel, former manager of U.S. Postal and Discovery Channel. Astana was banned from the 2008 Tour de France because of doping scandals in the 2007 Tour, although all involved in those scandals had been replaced. Leipheimer created a website to petition, unsuccessfully, for admittance to the 2008 Tour.

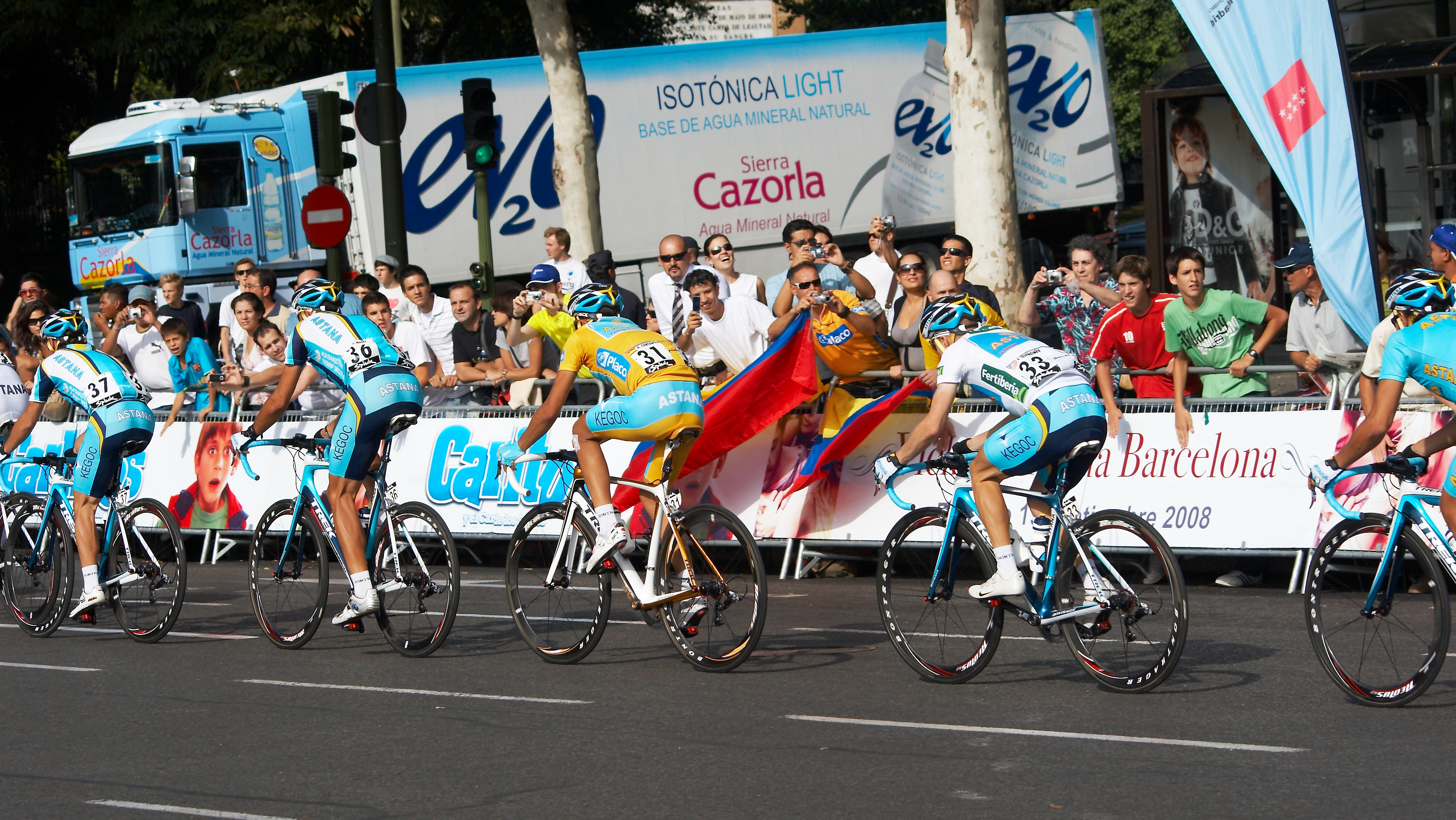
#33: Leipheimer on Alberto Contador's wheel in 2008 Vuelta a España

Leipheimer won the 2008 Tour of California. At the last minute, Astana was admitted to the Giro d'Italia, and Leipheimer finished 18th, helping teammate Contador to victory. He won the bronze medal at the Beijing 2008 Summer Olympics in the road time trial. Leipheimer won both time trials of the 2008 Vuelta a España, leading the race after the fifth stage, and placed second overall.

Leipheimer began 2009 by winning the Tour of California for the third consecutive year. He broke away during the final climb of stage 2 and led after the stage. Leipheimer won stage 6, the Solvang individual time trial. Astana teammate Lance Armstrong, in his second race after returning from retirement, rode for Leipheimer. Leipheimer won the 2009 SRAM Tour of the Gila with Astana teammates Chris Horner and Armstrong, who finished second but, as UCI regulations meant that Astana were ineligible for the event, the three rode as Team Mellow Johnny's, named after Armstrong's bike shop.

In May, Leipheimer rode for Astana in the Giro d'Italia and finished 6th overall, the team's best placement. Later, the 2nd-place finisher Danilo Di Luca tested positive for a banned substance and was stripped of his position, moving Leipheimer up to a 5th-place finish in the records.

Riding with Astana in the 2009 Tour de France, Leipheimer broke a wrist in a crash near the end of stage 12, when he was 4th overall, and abandoned the race.

=== Team RadioShack (2010–2011) ===
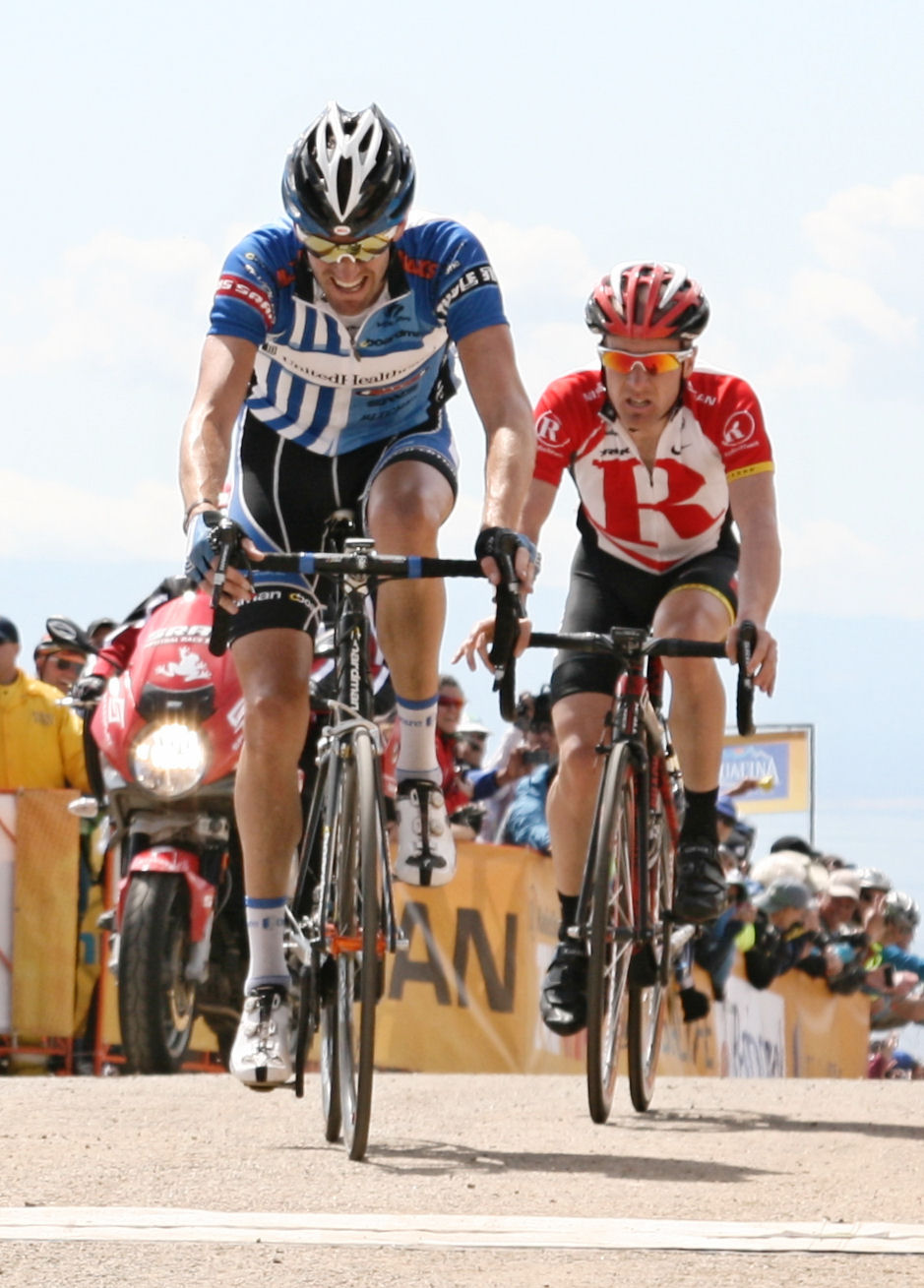
Leipheimer trails Rory Sutherland in 2011 Tour of California

Leipheimer moved, along with Armstrong and several others from Astana's 2009 team, to Team RadioShack for 2010. He won his second consecutive SRAM Tour of the Gila in April. At the 2010 Tour de California Leipheimer finished in third place overall.

Leipheimer was favored to lead the team in California again for 2011, but became the team's chief domestique instead, riding in support of Chris Horner's eventual victory, after the latter posted a stronger time on mountainous stage four into San Jose. Leipheimer also won the stage finishing at the Mount Baldy ski area, and was second in the individual time trial. In his next race, the Tour of Switzerland, Leipheimer won, besting the race leader Damiano Cunego by 2 minutes in the final time trial stage, to win the tour by 4 seconds.

Leipheimer won the first edition of the USA Pro Cycling Challenge, winning the first stage and the third stage time trial.

=== Omega Pharma - Quick-Step (2012) ===
Leipheimer joined Patrick Lefevere's Omega Pharma–Quick-Step team for what was supposed to be the 2012 and 2013 seasons. He started his year by winning the Tour de San Luis in Argentina. However, while on a training ride on the eve of the Vuelta Ciclista al Pais Vasco, he broke his fibula when he collided with a car. He stated that he thought he would die when the accident happened. He returned to competition at the Tour of California, where he won the "Most Courageous" jersey after stage one, in recognition of his return from the serious injury. He finished the race in sixth overall.

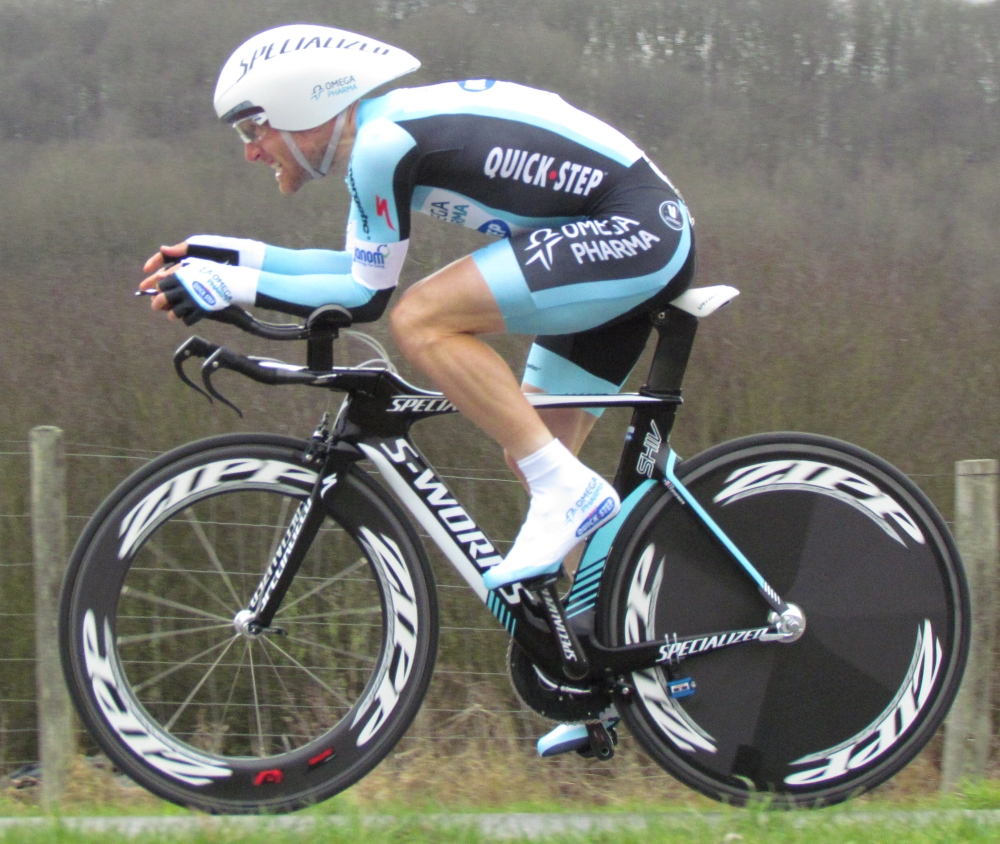
Leipheimer in the 2012 Paris–Nice

Leipheimer followed his California performance with third place overall in the Tour de Suisse. Leipheimer won a stage of the Tour of Utah, and finished third overall in the USA Pro Cycling Challenge, having led the race for one day.

Omega Pharma-Quick Step terminated Leipheimer's contract in October, one week after his testimony to USADA.

=== Retirement ===
Leipheimer officially retired from pro cycling in May 2013. As previously noted, Leipheimer had cooperated with USADA in their case against Lance Armstrong, and detailed his own use of performance-enhancing drugs and methods while riding for U.S. Postal Service, Rabobank, Gerolsteiner and Astana. In an October 2012 op-ed for the website of The Wall Street Journal ("Why I Doped"), Leipheimer also asserted to have raced the last five years of his career clean.

Leipheimer and four other riders — George Hincapie, Christian Vande Velde, David Zabriskie and Tom Danielson — received six-month suspensions and were stripped of results. Hincapie retired; the others resumed racing in 2013 after serving their suspensions.

On May 19, 2013, Leipheimer admitted to The Press Democrat that he was "transitioning into the rest of my life." "I'm retired," he told them. "It's just been an 'unceremoniously' retired."

== Personal life ==
On Tuesday, October 23, 2012, a feature-length documentary on Leipheimer's career entitled The Levi Effect: The Story of Levi Leipheimer was screened in select theaters in the United States.

== Career achievements ==
=== Major results ===
All results from June 1, 1999 to July 30, 2006 and July 7 to 29, 2007 are stripped.

1995
1st Overall Tour de la Province de Namur
1997
1st Stage 2 Cascade Cycling Classic
1st Prologue Tour de Toona
1998
1st Overall Tour de Beauce

1st Stage 3

1999
1st Time trial, National Road Championships

Voided results from June 1999 to July 30, 2006.

~~1st Overall Tour de Beauce~~

~~1st Stage 3~~

~~2nd Road race, Pan American Games~~
~~3rd Sea Otter Classic~~
2000
~~1st Stage 2 Circuit Franco-Belge~~
2001
~~Redlands Bicycle Classic~~

~~1st Mountains classification~~
~~1st Stage 5~~

~~1st Stage 1 Sea Otter Classic~~
~~2nd Overall Vuelta a Castilla y León~~
~~3rd Overall Vuelta a España~~
2002
~~1st Overall Route du Sud~~

~~1st Stage 3 (ITT)~~

~~8th Overall Tour de France~~
2003
~~8th Overall Critérium du Dauphiné Libéré~~
2004
~~1st Stage 4 Setmana Catalana de Ciclisme~~
~~5th Overall Tour of the Basque Country~~
~~8th Overall Critérium du Dauphiné Libéré~~
~~9th Overall Tour de France~~
2005
~~1st Overall Deutschland Tour~~

~~1st Mountains classification~~
~~1st Stage 4~~

~~2nd Overall Tour de Georgia~~
~~3rd Overall Critérium du Dauphiné Libéré~~
~~6th Overall Tour de France~~
2006
~~1st Overall Critérium du Dauphiné Libéré~~
~~2nd Overall Deutschland Tour~~

~~1st Stage 5~~

~~6th Overall Tour of California~~

~~1st Mountains classification~~
~~1st Prologue~~

~~Combativity award Stage 18 Tour de France~~

2007
1st Road race, National Road Championships
1st USA Cycling Professional Tour
1st Overall Tour of California

1st Prologue & Stage 5 (ITT)

Tour de Georgia

1st Stage 4 (ITT) & 5

1st Stage 3 (ITT) Tour of Missouri
1st Copperopolis Road Race
2nd Overall Deutschland Tour

Voided results from July 7, 2007 to July 29, 2007.

~~3rd Overall Tour de France~~

~~1st Stage 19 (ITT)~~

2008
1st Overall Tour of California

1st Stage 5 (ITT)

1st Overall Cascade Cycling Classic
1st Clásica a los Puertos de Guadarrama
2nd Overall Vuelta a España

1st Stage 5 & 20

3rd Overall Critérium du Dauphiné Libéré

1st Prologue

3rd Overall Tour de Georgia
3rd Time trial, Olympic Games
4th Time trial, UCI Road World Championships
2009
1st Overall Tour of California

1st Stage 6 (ITT)

1st Overall Vuelta a Castilla y León

1st Stage 2 (ITT)

1st Overall Tour of the Gila

1st Stage 1 & 3 (ITT)

1st Stage 4 (TTT) Tour de France
1st Stage 2 Sea Otter Classic
4th Overall Giro d'Italia
2010
1st Overall Tour of Utah

1st Stage 2

1st Overall Tour of the Gila

1st Stage 1

1st Leadville Trail 100 MTB
3rd Overall Tour of California
2011
1st Overall USA Pro Cycling Challenge

1st Stage 1 & 3

1st Overall Tour de Suisse
1st Overall Tour of Utah
2nd Overall Tour of California

1st Stage 7

3rd Overall Vuelta a Andalucía
5th Grand Prix Cycliste de Québec
8th Overall Paris–Nice
2012
1st Overall Tour de San Luis

1st Stage 3 (Note: Retroactively awarded after Alberto Contador's results were disqualified following his backdated two-year ban in February 2012.) & 4 (ITT)

3rd Overall Tour de Suisse
3rd Overall USA Pro Cycling Challenge
6th Overall Tour of California
6th Overall Tour of Utah

1st Stage 6

==== General classification results timeline ====
Grand Tour general classification results
Grand Tour	2000	2001	2002	2003	2004	2005	2006	2007	2008	2009	2010	2011	2012
Giro d'Italia	—	—	—	—	—	—	—	—	18	4	—	—	—
Tour de France	—	—	~~8~~	~~DNF~~	~~9~~	~~6~~	~~12~~	~~3~~	—	DNF	12	32	32
/ Vuelta a España	—	~~3~~	—	~~58~~	—	—	—	—	2	—	—	—	—
Major stage race general classification results
Race	2000	2001	2002	2003	2004	2005	2006	2007	2008	2009	2010	2011	2012
/ Paris–Nice	—	—	—	—	~~22~~	—	—	26	—	—	22	8	35
/ Tirreno–Adriatico	—	—	—	—	—	—	~~DNF~~	—	—	—	—	—	—
Volta a Catalunya	~~43~~	~~44~~	—	—	—	—	~~20~~	—	—	—	21	—	23
Tour of the Basque Country	—	—	~~41~~	~~18~~	~~5~~	~~77~~	—	—	—	—	—	76	—
/ Tour de Romandie	—	—	~~54~~	—	—	—	—	—	—	—	—	—	—
Critérium du Dauphiné	—	—	—	~~8~~	~~8~~	~~3~~	~~1~~	24	3	—	—	—	—
Tour de Suisse	—	—	—	—	—	—	—	—	—	—	10	1	3

Legend
—	Did not compete
DNF	Did not finish
~~No.~~	Voided results

== Notes ==
Sporting positions
Preceded by George Hincapie	USA National Road Race Champion; 2007	Succeeded by Tyler Hamilton
