= Levi Leipheimer's King Ridge GranFondo =

Race details
- Date: October 5, 2019
- Region: Sonoma County, California USA
- Local name(s): Levi's GranFondo
- Competition: Professional/Amateur
- Type: Cyclosportive
- Organiser: Bike Monkey
- Race director: Carlos Pérez

History
- First edition: 2009
- Editions: 11

Levi Leipheimer's King Ridge GranFondo is a mass participation bicycle ride held each year in Sonoma County, California. Currently, the event draws 7500 professional and amateur athletes from all 50 US states and from six continents. Sonoma County resident and former professional cyclist Levi Leipheimer founded the ride in 2009.

No GranFondo was held in 2020.

== Course/Routes ==
Levi's GranFondo consists of different routes with tiered levels of difficulty. The shortest 22-mile (35 km) and 40-mile (64 km) routes, the Piccolino and Piccolo, respectively, are intended for recreational and beginner cyclists. The intermediate Medio course is 63 miles (101 km) of fast-rolling tarmac through vineyards plus two notable climbs. The Geysers course of 81 miles (130 km) includes serious climbs totaling more than 6,000 ft (1,800 m) with sweeping views of Sonoma County's wine region. The 120-mile (190 km) Gran route of earlier years has been modified to include two long, steep climbs along the Stewarts Point Road. The Growler of 139 miles (224 km) extends the Gran climbs through the Geysers for an additional 3,000 ft (910 m) of climbing to bring the total to almost 13,000 feet (4,000 m) of climbing. Participants of all paths begin together in a mass start peloton of over seven thousand cyclists.

== Charities ==
Levi's GranFondo has a charitable giving component with beneficiaries focused on community-building through investment in youth, health, and cycling. The organizations it benefits have included the Sonoma County Humane Society's Forget Me Not Farm, the NorCal High School Mountain Bike League, Livestrong Foundation, the Dempsey Center for Cancer Hope and Healing, the Pablove Foundation, and the GranFondo's own community giving program. This community giving includes donations to area volunteer fire departments, elementary schools, local parks, and a pothole paving program on popular cycling routes in Sonoma County. Levi's GranFondo has also contributed to the City of Santa Rosa's bid to host stages of the Amgen Tour of California. As of September 2013, cumulative giving totalled over $930,000. An additional $212,000 is expected to be given by the end of 2013.
