= Frank Pipp =

American cyclist (born 1977)

Personal information
- Full name: Frank Kevin Pipp
- Born: May 22, 1977 (age 49) Iron Mountain, Michigan

Cycling career
- Sport: Cycling
- Current team: Retired
- Discipline: Road
- Role: Rider

Professional teams
- 2005: Advantage Benefits–Endeavour
- 2006: Targetraining
- 2007–2008: Health Net–Maxxis
- 2009–2013: Bissell

Frank Kevin Pipp (born May 22, 1977, in Iron Mountain, Michigan) is an American former cyclist, who competed as a professional from 2005 to 2013.

== Major results ==
2004
1st Stage 2 Joe Martin Stage Race
2005
10th Wachovia Invitational
2006
1st Stage 3 Tour de Toona
1st Stage 6 Vuelta Sonora
4th Univest Grand Prix
2007
1st Stage 6 Nature Valley Grand Prix
3rd Lancaster Classic
6th Overall Tour of Missouri
10th Philadelphia International Championship
2008
4th Commerce Bank Reading Classic
2010
4th Univest Grand Prix
2011
1st Overall Joe Martin Stage Race
1st Stage 2 Tour of the Gila
2nd Univest Grand Prix
2012
2nd Road race, National Road Championships
7th Overall Tour of Elk Grove
