= Dominique Rollin =

Canadian cyclist

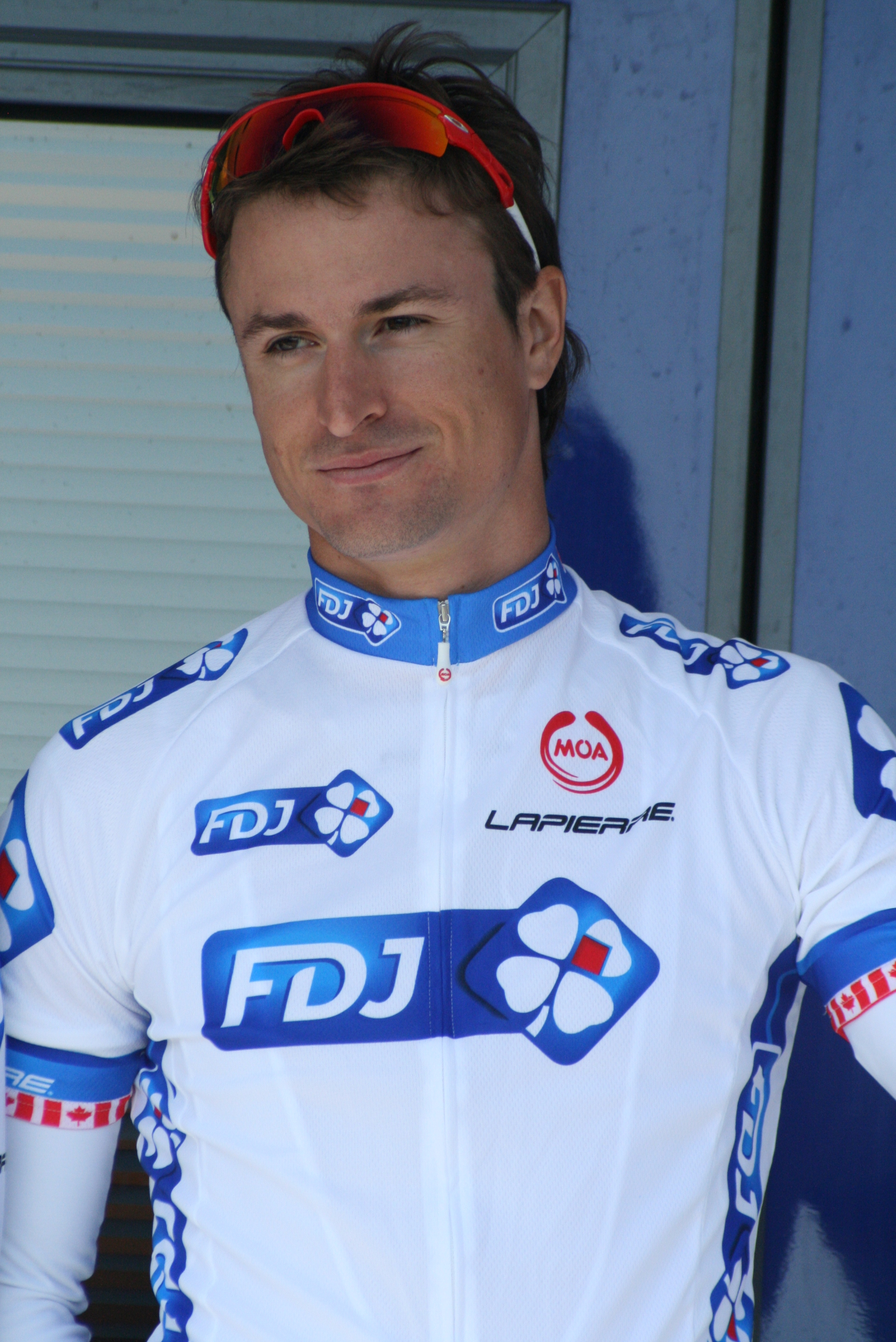
- Rollin at the 2011 Four Days of Dunkirk

Personal information
- Full name: Dominique Rollin
- Born: 29 October 1982 (age 43) Boucherville, Quebec
- Height: 188 cm (6 ft 2 in)
- Weight: 82 kg (181 lb)

Cycling career
- Sport: Cycling
- Current team: Retired
- Discipline: Road
- Role: Rider
- Rider type: Sprinter

Amateur teams
- 2004: USSA Pavilly Barentin
- 2005: Equipe du Quebec
- 2005: Gypco Télé-Annonces
- 2006: Vélo-Club de Roubaix Lille Métropole

Professional teams
- 2001–2002: Sympatico – Jet Fuel Coffee
- 2007: Kodakgallery.com – Sierra Nevada Brewing Co.
- 2008: Toyota–United
- 2009–2010: Cervélo TestTeam
- 2011–2013: FDJ
- 2015: Cofidis

Major wins
- Tour of California, 1 Stage; Rochester Omnium; National Road Race Championships (2006)

Dominique Rollin (born 29 October 1982) is a Canadian former professional cyclist.

Born in Boucherville, Quebec, Rollin began his professional career in 2001 with the team Sympatico High Speed-Jet Fuel Coffee and again the following year, 2002 with Sympatico Edition Haute Vitese. He then spent three years in France racing as an elite amateur under director-sportif Guy Gallopin for the Roubaix team. After having issues with the way he was treated during Roubaix's transition to a professional team, he returned to North America to ride for the Kodakgallery.com - Sierra Nevada Brewing Co. team.

For 2008 Rollin joined the Toyota-United team, with whom he won the Rochester Omnium and the fourth stage of the Tour of California. He won the stage with a nearly seven-hour breakaway in a driving rainstorm, just holding off his fellow breakaway companions after attacking near the finish. Thanks to that performance, he grabbed the lead in the sprints classification and would defend the jersey successfully for the remainder of the race.

In 2009 he got his chance to join a major European professional team in the Swiss-based, Canadian-sponsored Cervélo TestTeam, with his best result of the year coming at the Scheldeprijs semi-classic where he reached the podium with a third place. In October 2010, he signed for two years with the ProTour team FDJ.

Rollin initially retired from racing at the end of 2013 after being unable to secure a contract for the 2014 season. However, in August 2014 Cofidis announced that they had signed Rollin alongside his former FDJ teammates Nacer Bouhanni and Geoffrey Soupe for 2015.

== Career achievements ==
=== Major results ===
2005
1st 1 stage Tour de Beauce

2006
1st National Road Race Championships
1st 1 stage Tour de Gironde

2007
3rd overall Tour of Missouri
(bronze) Pan American Games Time Trial

2008
Tour of California

1st Stage 4
1st Sprints classification

1st Overall Rochester Omnium & 1 Stage
1st 1 stage Tour of Southland
2nd Overall Tour de Murrieta
9th Overall Tour of Missouri

1st Mountains classification

2009
5th Profronde van Drenthe
3rd Scheldeprijs Vlaanderen

2010
2nd Tour du Poitou-Charentes

2011
10th Dwars door Vlaanderen

2013
6th Cholet-Pays de Loire

=== Grand Tour general classification results timeline ===
Grand Tour	2009	2010	2011	2012	2013
Giro d'Italia	—	—	—	DNF	75
Tour de France	—	—	—	—	—
Vuelta a España	DNF	—	—	153	—

Legend
—	Did not compete
DNF	Did not finish
