= 2012 USA Pro Cycling Challenge =

2011–12 UCI America Tour

Race details
- Dates: August 20–26, 2012
- Stages: 7
- Winning time: 25h 57' 34"

Results
Jersey awarded to the overall winner	Winner	Christian Vande Velde (USA)	(Garmin–Sharp)
	Second	Tejay van Garderen (USA)	(BMC Racing Team)
	Third	Levi Leipheimer (USA)	(Omega Pharma–Quick-Step)
Jersey awarded to the mountains classification winner	Mountains	Jens Voigt (GER)	(RadioShack–Nissan)
Jersey awarded to the youth classification winner	Youth	Joseph Dombrowski (USA)	(Bontrager–Livestrong)
Jersey awarded to the sprints classification winner	Sprints	Tyler Farrar (USA)	(Garmin–Sharp)
	Team	RadioShack–Nissan	

The 2012 USA Pro Cycling Challenge was the second edition of the USA Pro Cycling Challenge stage race. The race took place from August 20–26, and was rated as a 2.HC event on the UCI America Tour. The race began in Durango, wound its way through the Rocky Mountains at heights of up to 12,000 feet (3,700 m), and finished in the streets of downtown Denver.

Americans swept the podium, with Christian Vande Velde winning the race, Tejay van Garderen finishing second, and Levi Leipheimer finishing third.

== Participating teams ==
Included in the participating team rosters were many of the top 2012 Tour de France riders; Vincenzo Nibali (3rd), Tejay van Garderen (5th), Cadel Evans (7th), Janez Brajkovič (9th), Andreas Klöden (11th), Chris Horner (13th), Levi Leipheimer (32nd), and Christian Vande Velde (60th). The USA Pro Cycling Challenge invited six UCI ProTeams, and UCI Professional Continental Teams; as well as five UCI Continental Teams.

UCI ProTeams

- Omega Pharma–Quick-Step
- BMC Racing Team
- Garmin–Cervélo
- RadioShack–Nissan
- Liquigas–Cannondale
- Astana

UCI Professional Continental Teams

- RusVelo
- UnitedHealthcare
- Champion System
- SpiderTech–C10
- Bissell
- Optum–Kelly Benefit Strategies

UCI Continental Teams

- Team Exergy
- EPM–UNE
- Team Type 1–Sanofi
- Bontrager–Livestrong

== Stage Results ==
Stage results
Stage	Date	Route	Terrain	Length	Winner
1	20 August	Durango – Telluride	Medium-mountain stage	125.6 mi (202.1 km)	Tyler Farrar (USA)
2	21 August	Montrose – Crested Butte	Mountain stage	99.2 mi (159.6 km)	Tejay van Garderen (USA)
3	22 August	Gunnison – Aspen	Mountain stage	130.5 mi (210.0 km)	Tom Danielson (USA)
4	23 August	Aspen – Beaver Creek	Mountain stage	97.2 mi (156.4 km)	Jens Voigt (GER)
5	24 August	Breckenridge – Colorado Springs	Medium-mountain stage	117.9 mi (189.7 km)	Tyler Farrar (USA)
6	25 August	Golden – Boulder	Mountain stage	103.3 mi (166.2 km)	Rory Sutherland (AUS)
7	26 August	Denver	Individual time trial	9.5 mi (15.3 km)	Taylor Phinney (USA)

=== Stage 1 ===
August 20, 2012 — Durango, to Telluride, 125.6 miles (202.1 km)

The opening road race for the pro challenge began in Durango.

	Rider	Team	Time
1	Tyler Farrar (USA)	EF Education–EasyPost	4h 42' 48"
2	Alessandro Bazzana (ITA)	Team Type 1–Sanofi	s.t
3	Damiano Caruso (ITA)	BMC Racing Team	s.t
4	Fred Rodriguez (USA)	Team Exergy	s.t
5	Rory Sutherland (AUS)	UnitedHealthcare	s.t
6	Gavin Mannion (USA)	Bontrager–Livestrong	s.t
7	Kiel Reijnen (USA)	Team Type 1–Sanofi	s.t
8	Alex Candelario (USA)	Optum–Kelly Benefit Strategies	s.t
9	Chris Horner (USA)	RadioShack–Nissan	s.t
10	Camilo Castiblanco (COL)	EPM–UNE	s.t

=== Stage 2 ===
August 21, 2012 — Montrose to Crested Butte, 99.2 miles (159.6 km)

	Rider	Team	Time
1	Tejay van Garderen (USA)	BMC Racing Team	3h 52' 24"
2	Christian Vande Velde (USA)	Garmin–Sharp	s.t
3	Ivan Rovny (RUS)	RusVelo	+ 6"
4	Levi Leipheimer (USA)	Omega Pharma–Quick-Step	+ 8"
5	Ramiro Rincón (COL)	EPM–UNE	+ 8"
6	Damiano Caruso (ITA)	Liquigas–Cannondale	+ 12"
7	Alessandro Bazzana (ITA)	Team Type 1–Sanofi	+ 12"
8	Chris Horner (USA)	RadioShack–Nissan	+ 12"
9	Janez Brajkovič (SLO)	Astana	+ 12"
10	Lucas Euser (USA)	SpiderTech–C10	+ 12"

=== Stage 3 ===
August 22, 2012 — Gunnison to Aspen, 130.5 miles (210.0 km)

	Rider	Team	Time
1	Tom Danielson (USA)	EF Education–EasyPost	5h 02' 06"
2	Damiano Caruso (ITA)	Liquigas–Cannondale	+ 2"
3	Jakob Fuglsang (DEN)	RadioShack–Nissan	+ 2"
4	Gavin Mannion (USA)	Bontrager–Livestrong	+ 2"
5	Janez Brajkovič (SLO)	Astana	+ 2"
6	Andreas Klöden (GER)	RadioShack–Nissan	+ 2"
7	Javier Gómez (COL)	EPM–UNE	+ 2"
8	Ivan Rovny (RUS)	RusVelo	+ 2"
9	Christian Vande Velde (USA)	EF Education–EasyPost	+ 2"
10	Christopher Baldwin (USA)	Bissell	+ 2"

=== Stage 4 ===
August 23, 2012 — Aspen to Beaver Creek, 97.2 miles (156.4 km)

	Rider	Team	Time
1	Jens Voigt (GER)	RadioShack–Nissan	3h 54' 00"
2	Andreas Klöden (GER)	RadioShack–Nissan	+ 2' 58"
3	Tejay van Garderen (USA)	BMC Racing Team	+ 2' 58"
4	Levi Leipheimer (USA)	Omega Pharma–Quick-Step	+ 2' 58"
5	Oliver Zaugg (SWI)	RadioShack–Nissan	+ 2' 58"
6	Christian Vande Velde (USA)	Garmin–Sharp	+ 2' 58"
7	Ivan Rovny (RUS)	RusVelo	+ 2' 58"
8	Joseph Dombrowski (USA)	Bontrager–Livestrong	+ 2' 58"
9	Janez Brajkovič (SLO)	Astana	+ 2' 58"
10	Ramiro Rincón (COL)	EPM–UNE	+ 3' 03"

=== Stage 5 ===
August 24, 2012 — Breckenridge to Colorado Springs, 117.9 miles (189.7 km)

	Rider	Team	Time
1	Tyler Farrar (USA)	Garmin–Sharp	3h 58' 27"
2	Taylor Phinney (USA)	BMC Racing Team	s.t
3	Alessandro Bazzana (ITA)	Team Type 1–Sanofi	s.t
4	Alex Candelario (USA)	Optum–Kelly Benefit Strategies	s.t
5	Hugo Houle (CAN)	SpiderTech–C10	s.t
6	Mathias Frank (SWI)	BMC Racing Team	s.t
7	Alex Howes (USA)	Garmin–Sharp	s.t
8	Andreas Klöden (GER)	RadioShack–Nissan	s.t
9	Damiano Caruso (ITA)	Liquigas–Cannondale	s.t
10	Róbigzon Oyola (COL)	EPM–UNE	s.t

=== Stage 6 ===
August 25, 2012 — Golden to Boulder, 103.3 miles (166.2 km)

	Rider	Team	Time
1	Rory Sutherland (AUS)	UnitedHealthcare	4h 06' 12"
2	Fabio Aru (ITA)	Astana	+ 20"
3	Jens Voigt (GER)	RadioShack–Nissan	+ 26"
4	Levi Leipheimer (USA)	Omega Pharma–Quick-Step	+ 45"
5	Tim Duggan (USA)	Liquigas–Cannondale	+ 52"
6	Christian Vande Velde (USA)	Garmin–Sharp	+ 1' 02"
7	Joseph Dombrowski (USA)	Bontrager–Livestrong	+ 1' 02"
8	Andreas Klöden (GER)	RadioShack–Nissan	+ 1' 02"
9	Vincenzo Nibali (ITA)	Liquigas–Cannondale	+ 1' 02"
10	Ramiro Rincón (COL)	EPM–UNE	+ 1' 02"

=== Stage 7 ===
August 26, 2012 — Denver, 9.5 miles (15.3 km)

The final stage was an individual time trial held through the streets of downtown Denver.

	Rider	Team	Time
1	Taylor Phinney (USA)	BMC Racing Team	17' 25"
2	Christian Vande Velde (USA)	Garmin–Sharp	+ 10"
3	Tejay van Garderen (USA)	BMC Racing Team	+ 19"
4	Peter Velits (SVK)	Omega Pharma–Quick-Step	+ 21"
5	Tom Danielson (USA)	Garmin–Sharp	+ 29"
6	Tom Zirbel (USA)	Optum–Kelly Benefit Strategies	+ 31"
7	Vincenzo Nibali (ITA)	Liquigas–Cannondale	+ 37"
8	Tanel Kangert (EST)	Astana	+ 40"
9	Levi Leipheimer (USA)	Omega Pharma–Quick-Step	+ 43"
10	David Zabriskie (USA)	Garmin–Sharp	+ 45"

== Classification leadership ==
Stage	Winner	General classification	Sprints classification	Mountains classification	Young rider classification	Most Aggressive	Team classification
1	Tyler Farrar	Tyler Farrar	Tyler Farrar	Tom Danielson	Gavin Mannion	Peter Stetina	Optum–Kelly Benefit Strategies
2	Tejay van Garderen	Tejay van Garderen	Tyler Farrar	Tom Danielson	Joseph Dombrowski	Rafael Abreu	EF Education–EasyPost
3	Tom Danielson	Christian Vande Velde	Damiano Caruso	Tom Danielson	Joseph Dombrowski	Francisco Colorado	EF Education–EasyPost
4	Jens Voigt	Tejay van Garderen	Damiano Caruso	Tom Danielson	Joseph Dombrowski	Jens Voigt	RadioShack–Nissan
5	Tyler Farrar	Tejay van Garderen	Tyler Farrar	Tom Danielson	Joseph Dombrowski	Vincenzo Nibali	RadioShack–Nissan
6	Rory Sutherland	Levi Leipheimer	Tyler Farrar	Jens Voigt	Joseph Dombrowski	Rory Sutherland	RadioShack–Nissan
7	Taylor Phinney	Christian Vande Velde	Tyler Farrar	Jens Voigt	Joseph Dombrowski	Peter Stetina	RadioShack–Nissan
Final		Christian Vande Velde	Tyler Farrar	Jens Voigt	Joseph Dombrowski	Peter Stetina	RadioShack–Nissan

== General classification ==
	Rider	Team	Time
1.	Christian Vande Velde (USA)	Garmin–Sharp	25h 57' 34"
2.	Tejay van Garderen (USA)	BMC Racing Team	+ 21"
3.	Levi Leipheimer (USA)	Omega Pharma–Quick-Step	+ 24"
4.	Andreas Klöden (GER)	RadioShack–Nissan	+ 1' 08"
5.	Janez Brajkovič (SLO)	Astana	+ 1' 14"
6.	Jakob Fuglsang (DEN)	RadioShack–Nissan	+ 1' 24"
7.	Tom Danielson (USA)	Garmin–Sharp	+ 1' 28"
8.	Matthew Busche (USA)	RadioShack–Nissan	+ 1' 32"
9.	Peter Stetina (USA)	Garmin–Sharp	+ 1' 28"
10.	Joseph Dombrowski (USA)	Bontrager–Livestrong	+ 1' 40"
