= Toyota–United =

Toyota
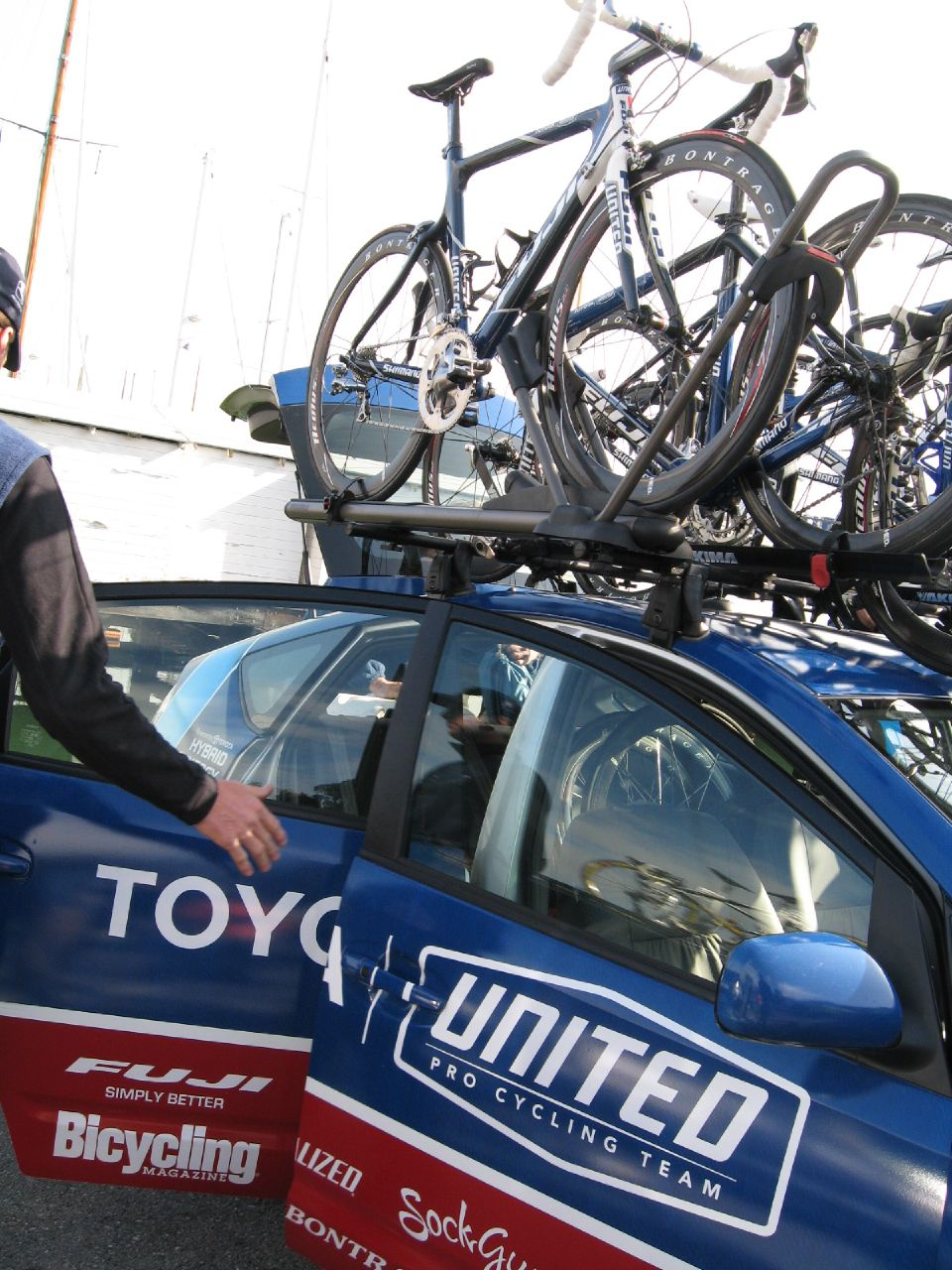

Team information
- UCI code: TUP
- Registered: States
- Founded: 2006
- Disbanded: 2008
- Discipline: Road
- Status: Continental

Key personnel
- General manager: Sean Tucker

Team name history
- 2005–present: Toyota-United

Toyota– Pro Cycling Team (UCI team code: TUP) was a continental professional bicycle racing team founded in 2005 by former Olympic cyclist Sean Tucker. The team was based in the States and participated in UCI Continental Circuits races, mainly in the UCI America Tour, as well as many other races in North America. Toyota– was the only domestic team to have won a stage in Tour of California and Tour de Georgia in 2006 and 2007. The team finished second in the National Race Calendar standings for the second consecutive season.

The team has folded and no longer exists.

== Squad ==
Rider	Date of birth
Christopher Baldwin (USA)	October 15, 1975 (age 50)
Stefano Barberi (BRA)	March 27, 1984 (age 42)
Heath Blackgrove (NZL)	December 5, 1980 (age 45)
Iván Domínguez (CUB)	May 28, 1976 (age 50)
Justin England (USA)	July 17, 1978 (age 48)
Walker Ferguson (USA)	February 26, 1982 (age 44)
José-Manuel "Chepe" Garcia (MEX)	December 1, 1972 (age 53)
Robert Lea (USA)	October 17, 1983 (age 42)
Caleb Manion (AUS)	January 30, 1981 (age 45)

Rider	Date of birth
Ryan Miller (USA)	May 16, 1980 (age 46)
Nathan Mitchell (USA)	July 7, 1984 (age 42)
Dominique Rollin (CAN)	October 29, 1982 (age 43)
Mark Scanlon (IRL)	October 10, 1980 (age 45)
Ivan Stević (SRB)	February 6, 1980 (age 46)
Sean Sullivan (AUS)	August 18, 1978 (age 48)
Henk Vogels (AUS)	July 31, 1973 (age 53)
Chris Wherry (USA)	July 18, 1973 (age 53)

== Notable riders ==
- Antonio Cruz (2006)
- Juan José Haedo (2006)
