= U.S. Open Cycling Championships =

The inaugural U. S. Open Cycling Championships is a road bicycle racing event that was held April 7, 2007 and ran from Williamsburg to Richmond, Virginia. The race was broadcast nationally in the United States on NBC Sports from 2:30 to 5:00 p.m. Eastern Time.

The U.S. Open, developed in partnership with USA Cycling and sanctioned by the UCI with the men's event part of the 2006–07 UCI America Tour. The U.S. Cycling Open featured both men's and women's professional fields. According to published reports, the event attempts to showcase the historic attractions of Virginia just weeks before the 400th Anniversary of America's first permanent English settlement in Jamestown, Virginia.

== Winners ==
=== Men's Event ===
Year	1st place	2nd place	3rd place
2007	(Canada) Svein Tuft, Symmetrics Professional Cycling Team	(United States) Pat McCarty, Team Slipstream	(Argentina) Alejandro Borrajo, Rite Aid Pro Cycling

=== Women's Event ===
Year	1st place	2nd place	3rd place
2007	(United States) Tina Pic, Colavita/Sutter Home	(United States) Jennifer McRae, Advil-Chapstick	(United States) Heather Labance, Advil-Chapstick
