= Will Frischkorn =

American cyclist (born 1981)

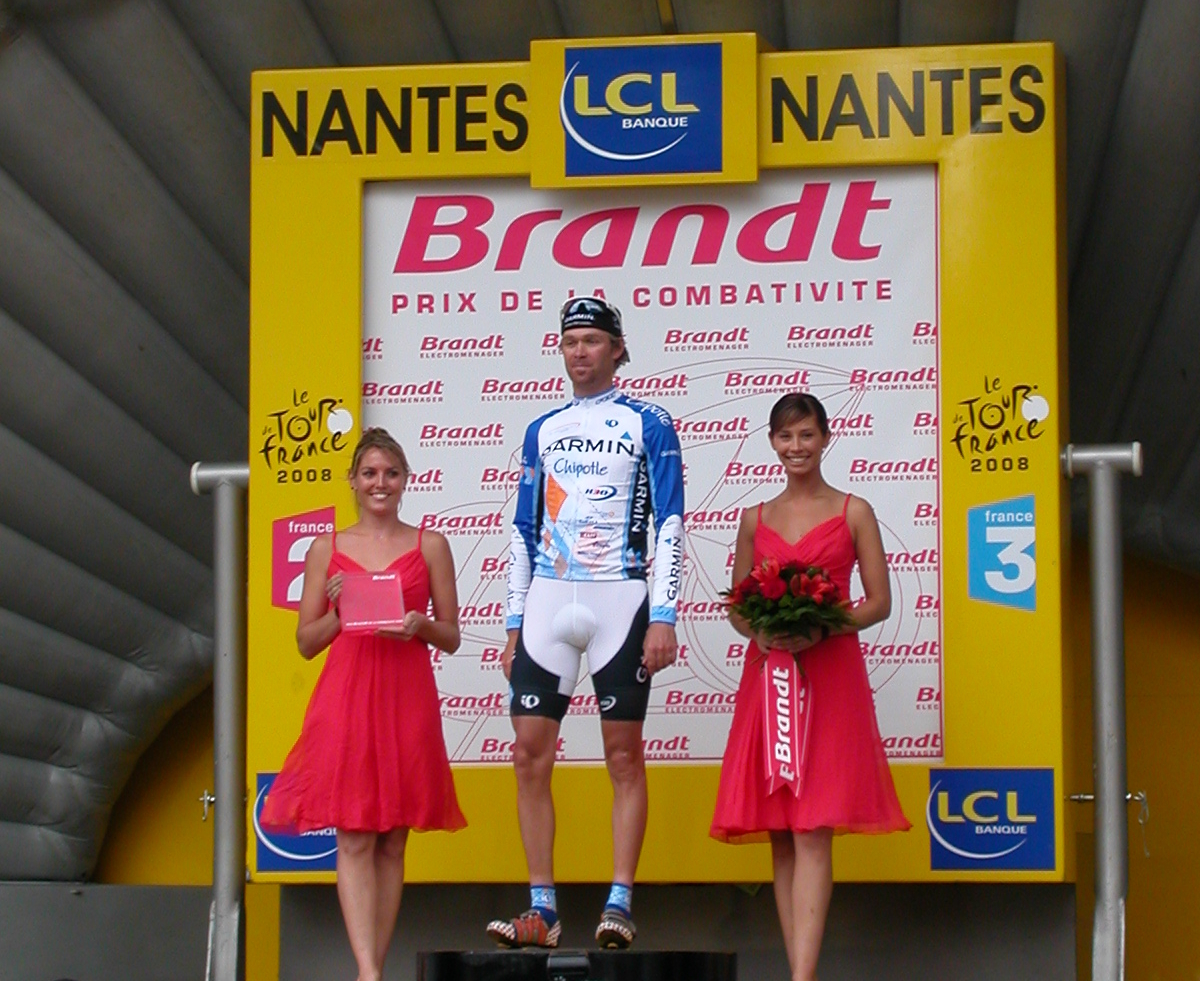

Personal information
- Full name: William Frischkorn
- Born: June 10, 1981 (age 45) United States
- Height: 6 ft 0 in (1.83 m)
- Weight: 150 lb (68 kg)

Cycling career
- Sport: Cycling
- Discipline: Road
- Role: Rider
- Rider type: All-rounder

Professional teams
- 2000–2001: Mercury
- 2002–2003: Saturn
- 2004: Colavita
- 2005–2009: TIAA–CREF

William Frischkorn (born June 10, 1981 in Charleston, West Virginia) is a former professional road bicycle racer, who finished his career with UCI ProTour team Garmin–Slipstream. He retired from professional cycling in September 2009 to take up a non-racing role with the team.

== Major results ==
1998
1st, US National Junior Championship (Road)
1999
2nd, US National Junior Championship (Cyclo-cross)
2000
3rd in Philadelphia
3rd, Stage 1, Cascade Classic
3rd, Stage 5, Cascade Classic
2003
1st, Boulder-Roubaix
2nd, Carter Lake Race
3rd, U23 category, Tour of Flanders
2nd, Tim Hortons Road National Championship
3rd, US National U23 Championship (Road Time-trial)
1st, Stage 3 and General Classification of the Tour de Delta
2004
1st, Koppenberg USA (USA)
3rd, Stage 4, Tour of Connecticut
2nd, Castle Rock
3rd, Stage 3, 2nd in General classification, Fitchburg Longsjo Classic
3rd, Coal Miners
1st, Stages 1 and 3, and in General Classification, Colorado Cyclist Classic
2005
1st, Prologue, 2nd, Stages 4,5 and 7b, Tour de la Martinique
3rd, US National Championship (Track, Elite Team Pursuit)
2006
2nd, Stage 6, Tour de Beauce
2nd, Stage 1, 2nd in General Classification, Bermuda GP
1st, US National Championship (Track, Elite Team Pursuit)
2007
1st, Stage 1a, 2nd in General Classification, Tour of the Bahamas
1st, Univest Grand Prix
2nd, General Classification, Tour of Missouri
2008
2nd, Stage 3, Tour de France
Combative rider, Stage 3, Tour de France
