= Lancaster Classic =

Bicycle race in Lancaster, Pennsylvania

Tom Bamford Lancaster Classic
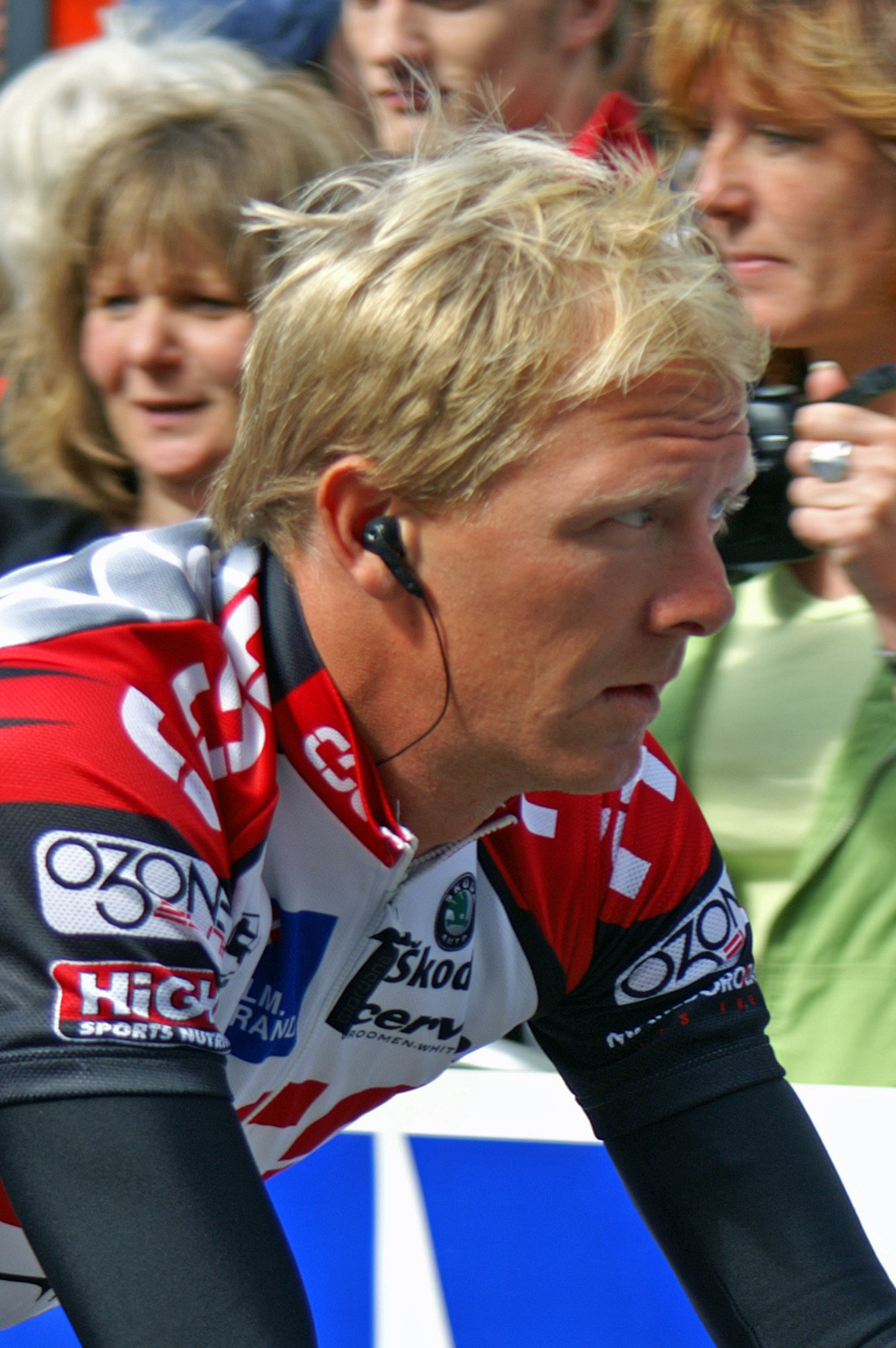
- Jakob Piil, the racer with the most wins at Lancaster (2)

Race details
- Region: Lancaster, Pennsylvania, U.S.
- Discipline: Road bicycle racing
- Competition: ICP Tour of America (1993-1996); First Union Cycling Series (1998-2002); Wachovia Cycling Series (2003-2005); UCI America (2006); US Cycling Pro Tour (2007)

History
- First edition: 1992
- Final edition: 2007
- First winner: Roberto Pelliconi (1992)
- Most wins: Jakob Piil (1999, 2003)
- Final winner: David Clinger (2007)

The Tom Bamford Lancaster Classic was a professional road bicycle race held in late May or early June between 1992 and 2007 in Lancaster, Pennsylvania, USA. With the exception of the first race, which was 57.6 miles (92.7 km), the Lancaster Classic covered about 91 miles (146 km). Due to the "short, winding hills," it had a very low attrition rate, with 37% of starters not finishing the race on average. 2003's 14% attrition was lower than that of the 2021 Tour de France, in which 23% of starters did not finish.

== History ==
The race was established in part by Lancaster mayor Janice Stork, along with sponsor CoreStates Financial Corporation (and its acquisitions, Hamilton Bank, First Union, and Wachovia National Bank), in an attempt to revitalize the downtown area.

The race underwent several name changes:

- CoreStates Hamilton Classic (1992-1996)
- CoreStates Invitational (1997)
- First Union Invitational (1998-2002)
- Wachovia Lancaster Invitational (2003-2005)
- Commerce Bank Tom Bamford Lancaster Classic (2006-2007)
  - Named in memory of a late CoreStates Hamilton Bank executive.

It was part of the following tours:

- ICP Tour of America (1993-1996)
- CoreStates USPRO Cycling Championship (1997)
- First Union Cycling Series (1998-2002)
- USPRO Saturn Tour (1999-2000)
- USPRO Championship (2001)
- Wachovia Cycling Series (2003-2005)
- Wachovia USPRO Championship (2004-2005)
- Commerce Bank Triple Crown of Cycling (first leg) (2006)
- UCI America (2006)
- US Cycling Pro Tour (2007)

In 2006, two additional races were added: the women's and elite amateur men's race lasted for 25 miles (40 km) and 30 miles (48 km), respectively, around a 0.68 miles (1.09 km) circuit in downtown Lancaster.

The Lancaster Classic ended abruptly after the 2007 event and was replaced by the Lehigh Valley Classic in nearby Allentown.

== Winners ==
=== Men's ===
Year	Winner	Time	Team	Starters	Finishers	Refs
1992	(Italy) Roberto Pelliconi	2:04:05	Mercatone Uno			
1993	(Latvia) Arvis Piziks	3:13:14	Latvian National Cycling Team	130	42	
1994	(Italy) Andrea Peron	3:13:13	Team Polti	133	50	
1995	(United States) Fred Rodriguez	3:07:12	USA Cycling	127	50	
1996	(United States) Chris Horner	3:28:25	Nutra Fig Cycling Team	120	44	
1997	(United States) Chann McRae	3:22:15	Saturn			
1998	(United States) Frankie Andreu	3:23:17	US Postal Service	150		
1999	(Denmark) Jakob Piil	3:19:42	Acceptcard	120	45	
2000	(United States) Trent Klasna	3:21:04	Saturn	140		
2001	(Netherlands) Léon van Bon	3:20:13	Mercury Viatel	150	65	
2002	(United States) David Clinger	3:18:52	US Postal Service			
2003	(Denmark) Jakob Piil	3:23:42	CSC Denmark	163	23	
2004	(Netherlands) Max van Heeswijk	3:17:27	US Postal Service	200	57	
2005	(New Zealand) Greg Henderson	3:21:28	Health Net - Maxxis	166	76	
2006	(United States) Jackson Stewart	3:09:20	Kodakgallery.com-Sierra Nevada	106	51	
2007	(Austria) Bernhard Eisel	3:18:41	T-Mobile Team	215	84	

=== Women's ===
Year	Winner	Time	Team	Starters	Finishers	Refs
2006	(Germany) Ina Teutenberg	54:21	T-Mobile			
2007	(Germany) Ina-Yoko Teutenberg	55:10	T-Mobile			

=== Amateur men's ===
Year	Winner	Time	Team	Starters	Finishers	Refs
2006	(United States) Jamie Carney					
2007						
