= 2013 UCI Road World Championships – Men's team time trial =

Men's team time trial
2013 UCI Road World Championships
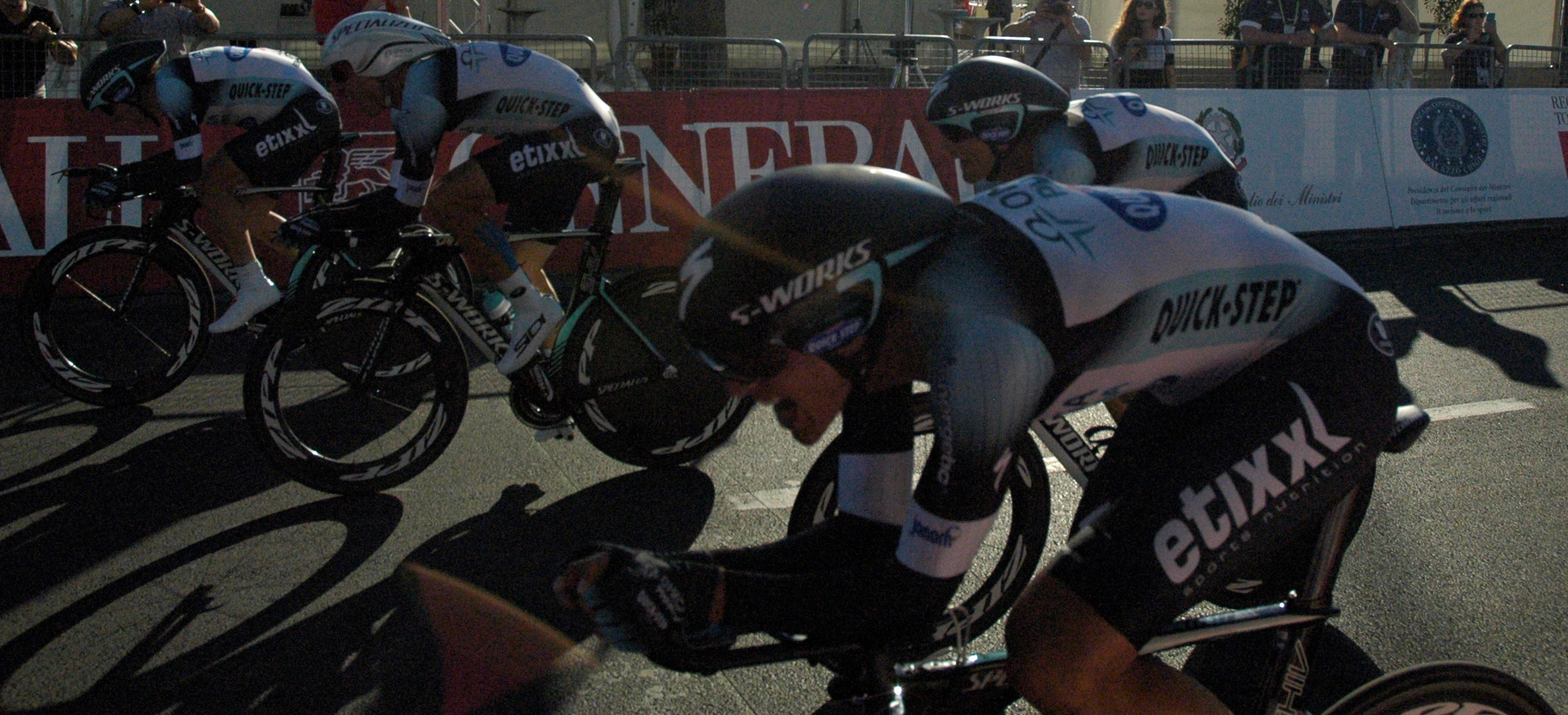
- Omega Pharma–Quick-Step finishing

Race details
- Dates: 22 September 2013
- Stages: 1
- Distance: 57.2 km (35.54 mi)
- Winning time: 1h 04' 16.81"

Medalists
	Gold	Omega Pharma–Quick-Step
	Silver	Orica–GreenEDGE
	Bronze	Team Sky

The Men's team time trial of the 2013 UCI Road World Championships cycling event took place on 22 September 2013 in the region of Tuscany, Italy.

The course of the race was 57.2 km (35.5 mi) from the town of Montecatini Terme to the Nelson Mandela Forum in Florence. Omega Pharma–Quick-Step were the defending champions, and successfully defended their title by 0.81 seconds over Orica–GreenEDGE, with Team Sky completing the podium in third place.

== Final classification ==
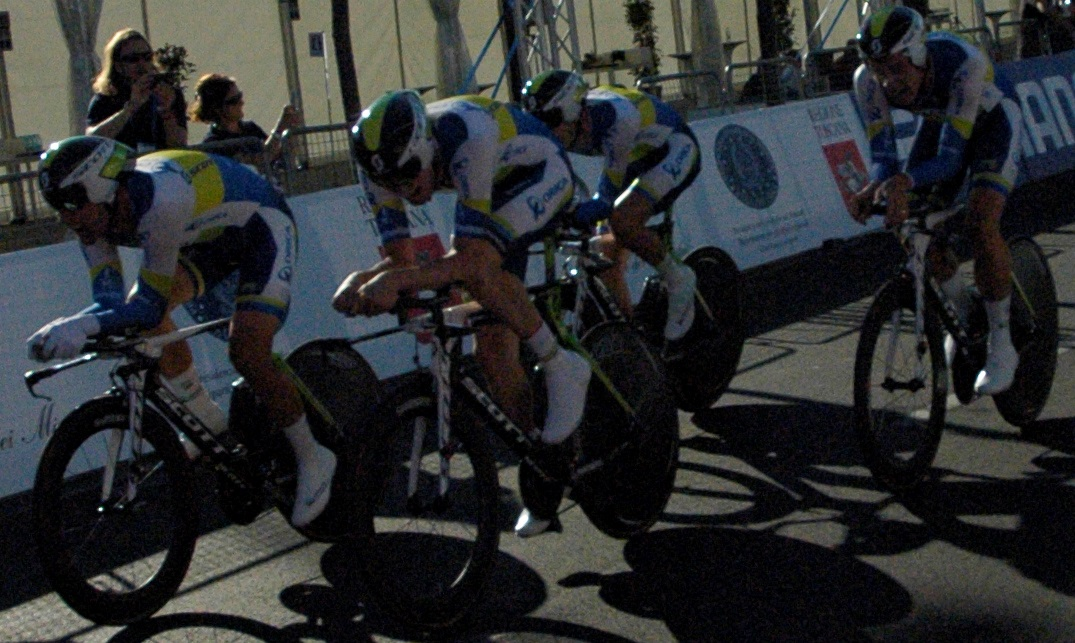
Orica–GreenEDGE

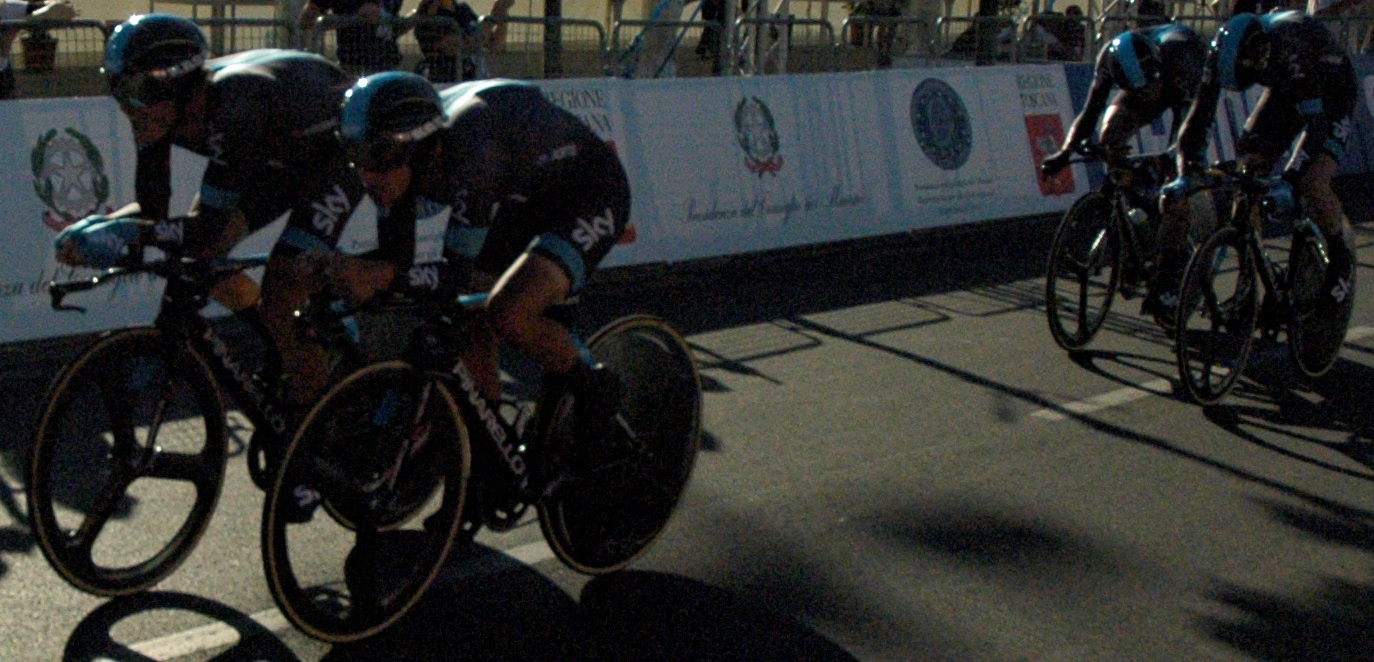
Team Sky

Rank	Team	Riders	Time
1	(Belgium) Omega Pharma–Quick-Step	Sylvain Chavanel (FRA); Michał Kwiatkowski (POL); Tony Martin (GER); Niki Terpstra (NED); Kristof Vandewalle (BEL); Peter Velits (SVK)	1h 04' 16.81"
2	(Australia) Orica–GreenEDGE	Luke Durbridge (AUS); Michael Hepburn (AUS); Daryl Impey (RSA); Brett Lancaster (AUS); Jens Mouris (NED); Svein Tuft (CAN)	+ 0.81"
3	(United Kingdom) Team Sky	Edvald Boasson Hagen (NOR); Chris Froome (GBR); Vasil Kiryienka (BLR); Richie Porte (AUS); Kanstantsin Sivtsov (BLR); Geraint Thomas (GBR)	+ 22.55"
4	(United States) BMC Racing Team	Steve Cummings (GBR); Daniel Oss (ITA); Taylor Phinney (USA); Manuel Quinziato (ITA); Michael Schär (SUI); Tejay van Garderen (USA)	+ 1' 02.71"
5	(Luxembourg) RadioShack–Leopard	Fabian Cancellara (SUI); Markel Irizar (ESP); Bob Jungels (LUX); Yaroslav Popovych (UKR); Hayden Roulston (NZL); Jesse Sergent (NZL)	+ 1' 17.53"
6	(Kazakhstan) Astana	Janez Brajkovič (SLO); Jakob Fuglsang (DEN); Dmitriy Gruzdev (KAZ); Andriy Hryvko (UKR); Tanel Kangert (EST); Alessandro Vanotti (ITA)	+ 1' 21.14"
7	(Italy) Cannondale	Maciej Bodnar (POL); Tiziano Dall'Antonia (ITA); Michel Koch (GER); Kristijan Koren (SLO); Peter Sagan (SVK); Brian Vandborg (DEN)	+ 1' 28.74"
8	(United States) Garmin–Sharp	Rohan Dennis (AUS); Tyler Farrar (USA); David Millar (GBR); Andrew Talansky (USA); Christian Vande Velde (USA); David Zabriskie (USA)	+ 2' 01.94"
9	(Denmark) Saxo–Tinkoff	Manuele Boaro (ITA); Mads Christensen (DEN); Michael Mørkøv (DEN); Nicolas Roche (IRL); Nicki Sørensen (DEN); Matteo Tosatto (ITA)	+ 2' 14.17"
10	(Spain) Movistar Team	Andrey Amador (CRC); Jonathan Castroviejo (ESP); Rui Costa (POR); Jesús Herrada (ESP); Rubén Plaza (ESP); Eloy Teruel (ESP)	+ 2' 31.03"
11	(Russia) Team Katusha	Maxim Belkov (RUS); Pavel Brutt (RUS); Mikhail Ignatiev (RUS); Vladimir Isaichev (RUS); Timofey Kritsky (RUS); Alexander Porsev (RUS)	+ 2' 45.80"
12	(Netherlands) Belkin Pro Cycling	Stef Clement (NED); Rick Flens (NED); Wilco Kelderman (NED); Tom Leezer (NED); Jos van Emden (NED); Robert Wagner (GER)	+ 2' 49.01"
13	(Belgium) Lotto–Belisol	Lars Bak (DEN); Bart De Clercq (BEL); André Greipel (GER); Adam Hansen (AUS); Greg Henderson (NZL); Jürgen Roelandts (BEL)	+ 3' 01.19"
14	(Netherlands) Argos–Shimano	Will Clarke (AUS); Tom Dumoulin (NED); Patrick Gretsch (GER); Reinardt Janse van Rensburg (RSA); Tobias Ludvigsson (SWE); Ramon Sinkeldam (NED)	+ 3' 06.86"
15	(France) FDJ.fr	Alexandre Geniez (FRA); Mathieu Ladagnous (FRA); Johan Le Bon (FRA); Yoann Offredo (FRA); Dominique Rollin (CAN); Jérémy Roy (FRA)	+ 3' 19.38"
16	(Netherlands) Vacansoleil–DCM	Thomas De Gendt (BEL); Juan Antonio Flecha (ESP); Sergey Lagutin (UZB); Bert-Jan Lindeman (NED); Mirko Selvaggi (ITA); Lieuwe Westra (NED)	+ 3' 38.44"
17	(Italy) Lampre–Merida	Matteo Bono (ITA); Davide Cimolai (ITA); Luca Dodi (ITA); Roberto Ferrari (ITA); Adriano Malori (ITA); Maximiliano Richeze (ARG)	+ 3' 56.31"
18	(Spain) Euskaltel–Euskadi	Mikel Astarloza (ESP); Jorge Azanza (ESP); Jon Izagirre (ESP); Romain Sicard (FRA); Ioannis Tamouridis (GRE); Gorka Verdugo (ESP)	+ 3' 59.95"
19	(Netherlands) Rabobank Development Team	Jasper Bovenhuis (NED); Lennard Hofstede (NED); Mike Teunissen (NED); Martijn Tusveld (NED); Rick Zabel (GER); Ruben Zepuntke (GER)	+ 4' 28.79"
20	(Slovenia) Adria Mobil	Kristijan Fajt (SLO); Bruno Maltar (CRO); Matej Mugerli (SLO); Tomaž Nose (SLO); Radoslav Rogina (CRO); Klemen Štimulak (SLO)	+ 4' 34.43"
21	(Poland) CCC–Polsat–Polkowice	Tomasz Kiendyś (POL); Jarosław Marycz (POL); Nikolay Mihaylov (BUL)); Davide Rebellin (ITA); Marek Rutkiewicz (POL); Mateusz Taciak (POL)	+ 4' 40.49"
22	(Belgium) Topsport Vlaanderen–Baloise	Laurens De Vreese (BEL); Pieter Jacobs (BEL); Gijs Van Hoecke (BEL); Arthur Vanoverberghe (BEL); Pieter Vanspeybrouck (BEL); Jelle Wallays (BEL)	+ 4' 54.80"
23	(United States) Optum–Kelly Benefit Strategies	Ryan Anderson (CAN); Jesse Anthony (USA); Mike Friedman (USA); Chad Haga (USA); Tom Zirbel (USA); Scott Zwizanski (USA)	+ 5' 09.48"
24	(France) Ag2r–La Mondiale	Gediminas Bagdonas (LTU); Julien Bérard (FRA); Ben Gastauer (LUX); Hugo Houle (CAN); Blel Kadri (FRA); Jean-Christophe Péraud (FRA)	+ 5' 18.92"
25	(Czech Republic) Etixx–IHNed	Dieter Bouvry (BEL); Markus Hoelgaard (NOR); Patrick Konrad (AUT); Florian Sénéchal (FRA); Samuel Spokes (AUS); Łukasz Wiśniowski (POL)	+ 5' 19.71"
26	(South Africa) MTN–Qhubeka	Ignatas Konovalovas (LTU); Bradley Potgieter (RSA); Kristian Sbaragli (ITA); Jay Thomson (RSA); Johann Van Zyl (RSA); Martin Wesemann (RSA)	+ 5' 20.60"
27	(Denmark) Team Cult Energy	Michael Valgren (DEN); Jesper Hansen (DEN); Magnus Cort (DEN); Mads Würtz Schmidt (DEN); André Steensen (DEN); Troels Vinther (DEN)	+ 5' 27.50"
28	(Ukraine) Kolss Cycling Team	Vitaliy Buts (UKR); Andriy Khripta (UKR); Mykhaylo Kononenko (UKR); Oleksandr Kvachuk (UKR); Sergiy Lagkuti (UKR); Andriy Vasylyuk (UKR)	+ 5' 27.99"
29	(Italy) Vini Fantini–Selle Italia	Stefano Borchi (ITA); Daniele Colli (ITA); Oscar Gatto (ITA); Luigi Miletta (ITA); Cristiano Monguzzi (ITA); Alessandro Proni (ITA)	+ 5' 28.99"
30	(Netherlands) Cycling Team De Rijke–Shanks	Dion Beukeboom (NED); Huub Duyn (NED); Christoph Pfingsten (GER); Bob Schoonbroodt (NED); Ronan van Zandbeek (NED); Coen Vermeltfoort (NED)	+ 5' 42.36"
31	(Poland) BDC-Marcpol Team	Paweł Bernas (POL); Kamil Gradek (POL); Piotr Kirpsza (POL); Mateusz Komar (POL); Jarosław Kowalczyk (POL); Robert Radosz (POL)	+ 6' 07.57"
32	(Austria) Gourmetfein–Simplon	Markus Eibegger (AUT); Matija Kvasina (CRO); Matej Marin (SLO); Stephan Rabitsch (AUT); Sebastian Schönberger (AUT); Jan Sokol (AUT)	+ 7' 13.42"
33	(Hungary) Utensilnord Ora24.eu	Gabriele Bosisio (ITA); Zsolt Der (HUN); Ábel Kenyeres (HUN); Krisztián Lovassy (HUN); Alessandro Mazzi (ITA); Federico Rocchetti (ITA)	+ 7' 55.62"
34	(Netherlands) Cycling Team Jo Piels	Bram de Kort (NED); Berden de Vries (NED); Jasper Hamelink (NED); Jochem Hoekstra (NED); Steven Lammertink (NED); Stefan Poutsma (NED)	+ 8' 34.65"
35	(Algeria) Vélo Club SOVAC	Nabil Baz (ALG); Hassen Ben Nacer (TUN); Hichem Chaabane (ALG); Karim Hadjbouzit (ALG); Abderrahmane Mehdi Hamza (ALG); Fayçal Hamza (ALG)	+ 11' 51.68"
