= 2012 Orica–GreenEDGE season =

2012 Orica–GreenEDGE season
Manager	Shayne Bannan
One-day victories	3
Stage race overall victories	4
Stage race stage victories	18
Next season

The 2012 season for the Orica–GreenEDGE cycling team began in January at the Bay Classic Series. As a UCI ProTeam, they were automatically invited and obligated to send a squad to every event in the UCI World Tour.

The team formed for the 2012 season as part of a scheme to promote cycling talent in Australia, and not come into such difficulties suffered by another Australian team – Pegasus Sports – which folded without contesting a race due to sponsorship issues. Much of the team's ridership is Australian, almost entirely anglophone, and the team competes under an Australian licence; as such, becoming the first Australian team to be part of the top-tier of professional cycling. Its manager is Shayne Bannan, the former Performance Director of Cycling Australia, while team's senior Director Sportif is ex-professional road cyclist Matt White, who had a similar role at Garmin–Cervélo before being sacked.

Known simply as GreenEDGE for the first four months of 2012, the team acquired Orica as a title sponsor shortly before the Giro d'Italia.

== 2012 roster ==
Ages as of 1 January 2012.

Rider	Date of birth
Michael Albasini (SUI)	20 December 1980 (aged 31)
Fumiyuki Beppu (JPN)	10 April 1983 (aged 28)
Sam Bewley (Note: Bewley joined the team on 22 May.) (NZL)	22 July 1987 (aged 24)
Jack Bobridge (AUS)	13 July 1989 (aged 22)
Simon Clarke (AUS)	18 July 1986 (aged 25)
Baden Cooke (AUS)	12 October 1978 (aged 33)
Allan Davis (AUS)	27 July 1980 (aged 31)
Julian Dean (NZ)	28 January 1975 (aged 36)
Mitchell Docker (AUS)	2 October 1986 (aged 25)
Luke Durbridge (AUS)	9 April 1991 (aged 20)
Simon Gerrans (AUS)	16 May 1980 (aged 31)
Matthew Goss (AUS)	5 November 1986 (aged 25)
Michael Hepburn (AUS)	17 August 1991 (aged 20)
Leigh Howard (AUS)	18 October 1989 (aged 22)
Daryl Impey (RSA)	6 December 1984 (aged 27)
Jens Keukeleire (BEL)	23 November 1988 (aged 23)

Rider	Date of birth
Aidis Kruopis (LIT)	26 October 1986 (aged 25)
Brett Lancaster (AUS)	15 November 1979 (aged 32)
Sebastian Langeveld (NED)	17 January 1985 (aged 26)
Robbie McEwen (Note: McEwen retired from the competitive aspect of the sport on 20 May, at the conclusion of the Tour of California, and became a technical advisor for this team.) (AUS)	24 June 1972 (aged 39)
Christian Meier (CAN)	2 September 1985 (aged 26)
Cameron Meyer (AUS)	11 January 1988 (aged 23)
Travis Meyer (AUS)	8 June 1989 (aged 22)
Jens Mouris (NED)	12 March 1980 (aged 31)
Stuart O'Grady (AUS)	6 August 1973 (aged 38)
Wesley Sulzberger (AUS)	26 October 1986 (aged 25)
Daniel Teklehaimanot (ERI)	10 November 1988 (aged 23)
Svein Tuft (CAN)	19 May 1977 (aged 34)
Tomas Vaitkus (LTU)	4 February 1982 (aged 29)
Pieter Weening (NED)	5 April 1981 (aged 30)
Matt Wilson (AUS)	1 October 1977 (aged 34)

=== Riders' 2011 teams ===
Rider	2011 team
Michael Albasini	HTC–Highroad
Fumiyuki Beppu	Team RadioShack
Jack Bobridge	Garmin–Cervélo
Simon Clarke	Astana
Baden Cooke	Saxo Bank–SunGard
Allan Davis	Astana
Julian Dean	Garmin–Cervélo
Mitchell Docker	Skil–Shimano
Luke Durbridge	neo-pro (Team Jayco-Skins)
Simon Gerrans	Team Sky
Matthew Goss	HTC–Highroad
Michael Hepburn	neo-pro (Team Jayco-Skins)
Leigh Howard	HTC–Highroad
Daryl Impey	Team NetApp
Jens Keukeleire	Cofidis

Rider	2011 team
Aidis Kruopis	Landbouwkrediet
Brett Lancaster	Garmin–Cervélo
Sebastian Langeveld	Rabobank
Robbie McEwen	Team RadioShack
Christian Meier	UnitedHealthcare
Cameron Meyer	Garmin–Cervélo
Travis Meyer	Garmin–Cervélo
Jens Mouris	Vacansoleil–DCM
Stuart O'Grady	Leopard Trek
Wesley Sulzberger	FDJ
Daniel Teklehaymanot	neo-pro (Cervélo TestTeam stagiaire, 2010)
Svein Tuft	SpiderTech–C10
Tomas Vaitkus	Astana
Pieter Weening	Rabobank
Matt Wilson	Garmin–Cervélo

== One-day races ==
The week after the Bay Classic Series, the team swept the Australian national championships in Buninyong, Victoria, as Gerrans – one of 16 GreenEDGE riders in the race – won the road race title, and Durbridge won the time trial title ahead of team-mate Cameron Meyer.

== Stage races ==
The team made its debut on New Year's Day, in the Bay Classic Series in Victoria, Australia. Davis won the men's classification racing for GreenEDGE's second team in the race, Mitchelton Wines/Lowe Farms.

In January, Gerrans won the Tour Down Under, giving the team an overall victory in its first World Tour event.

== Season victories ==
Date	Race	Competition	Rider	Country	Location
22 January	Tour Down Under, Overall	UCI World Tour	Simon Gerrans (AUS)	Australia	
7 March	Tirreno–Adriatico, Stage 1	UCI World Tour	Team time trial (Note: The riders on the squad were Matthew Goss, Stuart O'Grady, Sebastian Langeveld, Jens Mouris, Baden Cooke, Tomas Vaitkus, Svein Tuft, and Cameron Meyer)	Italy	Donoratico
17 March	Milan–San Remo	UCI World Tour	Simon Gerrans (AUS)	Italy	Sanremo
19 March	Volta a Catalunya, Stage 1	UCI World Tour	Michael Albasini (SUI)	Spain	Calella
20 March	Volta a Catalunya, Stage 2	UCI World Tour	Michael Albasini (SUI)	Spain	Girona
25 March	Volta a Catalunya, Overall	UCI World Tour	Michael Albasini (SUI)	Spain	
3 April	Tour of the Basque Country, Stage 2	UCI World Tour	Daryl Impey (RSA)	Spain	Vitoria-Gasteiz
4 April	Circuit de la Sarthe, Stage 3	UCI Europe Tour	Luke Durbridge (AUS)	France	Angers
6 April	Circuit de la Sarthe, Overall	UCI Europe Tour	Luke Durbridge (AUS)	France	
6 April	Circuit de la Sarthe, Young rider classification	UCI Europe Tour	Luke Durbridge (AUS)	France	
29 April	Presidential Cycling Tour of Turkey, Points classification	UCI Europe Tour	Matthew Goss (AUS)	Turkey	
7 May	Giro d'Italia, Stage 3	UCI World Tour	Matthew Goss (AUS)	Denmark	Horsens
18 May	Glava Tour of Norway, Stage 3	UCI Europe Tour	Aidis Kruopis (LIT)	Norway	Elverum
3 June	Critérium du Dauphiné, Prologue	UCI World Tour	Luke Durbridge (AUS)	France	Grenoble
15 June	Tour of Slovenia, Stage 2	UCI Europe Tour	Daryl Impey (RSA)	Slovenia	Metlika
16 June	Tour de Suisse, Stage 8	UCI World Tour	Michael Albasini (SUI)	Switzerland	Arosa
13 July	Tour de Pologne, Stage 4	UCI World Tour	Aidis Kruopis (LIT)	Poland	Katowice
7 August	Eneco Tour, Stage 2	UCI World Tour	Team time trial (Note: The riders on the squad were Sebastian Langeveld, Leigh Howard, Jens Keukeleire, Aidis Kruopis, Luke Durbridge, Jens Mouris, Svein Tuft, and Fumiyuki Beppu)	Netherlands	Sittard
11 August	Eneco Tour, Stage 6	UCI World Tour	Svein Tuft (CAN)	Belgium	Ardooie
21 August	Tour du Poitou-Charentes, Stage 1	UCI Europe Tour	Aidis Kruopis (LTU)	France	Royan
21 August	Vuelta a España, Stage 4	UCI World Tour	Simon Clarke (AUS)	Spain	Valdezcaray
22 August	Tour du Poitou-Charentes, Stage 2	UCI Europe Tour	Aidis Kruopis (LTU)	France	Melle
23 August	Tour du Poitou-Charentes, Stage 4	UCI Europe Tour	Luke Durbridge (AUS)	France	La Roche-Posay
24 August	Tour du Poitou-Charentes, Overall	UCI Europe Tour	Luke Durbridge (AUS)	France	
24 August	Tour du Poitou-Charentes, Points classification	UCI Europe Tour	Aidis Kruopis (LTU)	France	
24 August	Tour du Poitou-Charentes, Young rider classification	UCI Europe Tour	Luke Durbridge (AUS)	France	
7 September	Grand Prix Cycliste de Québec	UCI World Tour	Simon Gerrans (AUS)	Canada	Quebec City
9 September	Vuelta a España, Mountains classification	UCI World Tour	Simon Clarke (AUS)	Spain	
10 September	Tour of Britain, Stage 2	UCI Europe Tour	Leigh Howard (AUS)	Great Britain	Knowsley Safari Park
30 September	Duo Normand	UCI Europe Tour	Luke Durbridge (AUS); Svein Tuft (CAN)	France	Marigny
