= 2013 Orica–GreenEDGE season =

2013 Orica–GreenEDGE season
Manager	Shayne Bannan
One-day victories	5
Stage race overall victories	1
Stage race stage victories	21
Previous season • Next season

The 2013 season for the Orica–GreenEDGE cycling team began in January at the Bay Classic Series. As a UCI ProTeam, they were automatically invited and obligated to send a squad to every event in the UCI World Tour.

== 2013 roster ==
As of 6 August 2013.

Rider	Date of birth
Michael Albasini (SUI)	20 December 1980 (aged 32)
Fumiyuki Beppu (JPN)	10 April 1983 (aged 29)
Sam Bewley (NZL)	22 July 1987 (aged 25)
Simon Clarke (AUS)	18 July 1986 (aged 26)
Baden Cooke (AUS)	12 October 1978 (aged 34)
Allan Davis (AUS)	27 July 1980 (aged 32)
Julian Dean (NZL)	28 January 1975 (aged 37)
Mitchell Docker (AUS)	2 October 1986 (aged 26)
Luke Durbridge (AUS)	9 April 1991 (aged 21)
Simon Gerrans (AUS)	16 May 1980 (aged 32)
Matthew Goss (AUS)	5 November 1986 (aged 26)
Michael Hepburn (AUS)	17 August 1991 (aged 21)
Leigh Howard (AUS)	18 October 1989 (aged 23)
Damien Howson (Note: Howson joined the team on 1 August as a stagiaire, from Team Jayco-AIS.) (AUS)	13 August 1992 (aged 20)
Daryl Impey (RSA)	6 December 1984 (aged 28)
Jiyong Kang (Note: Kang joined the team on 1 August as a stagiaire, from the Geumsan Insam Cello squad.) (KOR)	19 February 1988 (aged 24)

Rider	Date of birth
Jens Keukeleire (BEL)	23 November 1988 (aged 24)
Aidis Kruopis (LIT)	26 October 1986 (aged 26)
Brett Lancaster (AUS)	15 November 1979 (aged 33)
Sebastian Langeveld (NED)	17 January 1985 (aged 27)
Michael Matthews (AUS)	26 September 1990 (aged 22)
Christian Meier (CAN)	2 September 1985 (aged 27)
Cameron Meyer (AUS)	11 January 1988 (aged 24)
Travis Meyer (AUS)	8 June 1989 (aged 23)
Jens Mouris (NED)	12 March 1980 (aged 32)
Stuart O'Grady (Note: O'Grady retired from professional cycling on 22 July, having completed the Tour de France.) (AUS)	6 August 1973 (aged 39)
Wesley Sulzberger (AUS)	26 October 1986 (aged 26)
Daniel Teklehaimanot (ERI)	10 November 1988 (aged 24)
Svein Tuft (CAN)	19 May 1977 (aged 35)
Tomas Vaitkus (LTU)	4 February 1982 (aged 30)
Pieter Weening (NED)	5 April 1981 (aged 31)

Riders who joined the team for the 2013 season

Rider	2012 team
Michael Matthews	Rabobank

Riders who left the team during or after the 2012 season

Rider	2013 team
Jack Bobridge	Blanco Pro Cycling
Robbie McEwen	Retired
Matthew Wilson	Retired

== Season victories ==
Date	Race	Competition	Rider	Country	Location
24 January	Tour de San Luis, Stage 4	UCI America Tour	Svein Tuft (CAN)	Argentina	San Luis
26 January	Tour Down Under, Stage 5	UCI World Tour	Simon Gerrans (AUS)	Australia	Willunga
4 February	Trofeo Campos–Santanyí–Ses Salines	UCI Europe Tour	Leigh Howard (AUS)	Spain	Campos
6 February	Trofeo Platja de Muro	UCI Europe Tour	Leigh Howard (AUS)	Spain	Muro
7 March	Paris–Nice, Stage 4	UCI World Tour	Michael Albasini (SUI)	France	Saint-Vallier
7 March	Tirreno–Adriatico, Stage 2	UCI World Tour	Matthew Goss (AUS)	Italy	Arezzo
23 March	Volta a Catalunya, Stage 6	UCI World Tour	Simon Gerrans (AUS)	Spain	Valls
24 March	Volta a Catalunya, Sprints classification	UCI World Tour	Christian Meier (CAN)	Spain	
24 March	Volta a Catalunya, Special sprints classification	UCI World Tour	Christian Meier (CAN)	Spain	
1 April	Tour of the Basque Country, Stage 1	UCI World Tour	Simon Gerrans (AUS)	Spain	Elgoibar
2 April	Tour of the Basque Country, Stage 2	UCI World Tour	Daryl Impey (RSA)	Spain	Vitoria-Gasteiz
3 April	Circuit de la Sarthe, Stage 3	UCI Europe Tour	Luke Durbridge (AUS)	France	Angers
5 April	Circuit de la Sarthe, Mountains classification	UCI Europe Tour	Cameron Meyer (AUS)	France	
22 April	Tour of Turkey, Stage 2	UCI Europe Tour	Aidis Kruopis (LIT)	Turkey	Antalya
23 May	Bayern-Rundfahrt, Stage 2	UCI Europe Tour	Daryl Impey (RSA)	Germany	Viechtach
6 June	Grand Prix of Aargau Canton	UCI Europe Tour	Michael Albasini (SUI)	Switzerland	Gippingen
8 June	Tour de Suisse, Stage 1	UCI World Tour	Cameron Meyer (AUS)	Switzerland	Quinto
13 June	Tour of Slovenia, Stage 1	UCI Europe Tour	Svein Tuft (CAN)	Slovenia	Ljubljana
16 June	Tour of Slovenia, Stage 4	UCI Europe Tour	Brett Lancaster (AUS)	Slovenia	Novo Mesto
16 June	Tour of Slovenia, Points classification	UCI Europe Tour	Brett Lancaster (AUS)	Slovenia	
1 July	Tour de France, Stage 3	UCI World Tour	Simon Gerrans (AUS)	France	Calvi
2 July	Tour de France, Stage 4	UCI World Tour	Team time trial (Note: The riders on the squad were Simon Gerrans, Michael Albasini, Simon Clarke, Matthew Goss, Daryl Impey, Brett Lancaster, Cameron Meyer, Stuart O'Grady and Svein Tuft)	France	Nice
25 July	Prueba Villafranca de Ordizia	UCI Europe Tour	Daniel Teklehaymanot (ERI)	Spain	Ordizia
3 August	Tour de Pologne, Overall	UCI World Tour	Pieter Weening (NED)	Poland	
7 August	Tour of Utah, Stage 2	UCI America Tour	Michael Matthews (AUS)	United States	Torrey
8 August	Vuelta a Burgos, Stage 2	UCI Europe Tour	Jens Keukeleire (BEL)	Spain	Clunia
9 August	Vuelta a Burgos, Stage 3	UCI Europe Tour	Jens Keukeleire (BEL)	Spain	Ojo Guareña
9 August	Tour of Utah, Stage 4	UCI America Tour	Michael Matthews (AUS)	United States	Salt Lake City
11 August	Tour of Utah, Sprints classification	UCI America Tour	Michael Matthews (AUS)	United States	
28 August	Vuelta a España, Stage 5	UCI World Tour	Michael Matthews (AUS)	Spain	Lago de Sanabria
15 September	Vuelta a España, Stage 21	UCI World Tour	Michael Matthews (AUS)	Spain	Madrid
29 September	Duo Normand	UCI Europe Tour	Luke Durbridge (AUS); Svein Tuft (CAN)	France	Marigny
