= Monguzzi =

Monguzzi is an Italian surname from Monza and Brianza, derived from the town of Monguzzo. Notable people with the surname include:

- Bruno Monguzzi (born 1941), Swiss graphic designer
- Cristiano Monguzzi (born 1985), Italian racing cyclist
