= Team Vandergroup =

South African road cycling team

Team information
- UCI code: VDG
- Registered: South Africa
- Founded: 2019
- Status: UCI Continental (2019–)

Team name history
- 2019–: Team Vandergroup

Team Vandergroup is a South African UCI Continental road cycling team. The team was established in 2018 in preparation for the 2019 season.

== Team roster ==
Rider	Date of birth
Tristian Cuthbert (RSA)	26 March 1998 (age 28)
Nolan Hoffman (RSA)	23 April 1985 (age 41)
Esias Joubert (RSA)	5 March 1999 (age 27)
David Maree (RSA)	31 August 1989 (age 37)
Henry Thomas Neethling (RSA)	14 August 1998 (age 28)
Bradley Potgieter (RSA)	11 May 1989 (age 37)
Jan Andre Storm (RSA)	17 June 1997 (age 29)
Ruben Van der Merwe (RSA)	25 November 1996 (age 29)
Steven Van Heerden (RSA)	6 August 1996 (age 30)
