= 2010 UCI Road World Championships – Men's under-23 time trial =

Men's under-23 time trial
2010 UCI Road World Championships
- Rainbow jersey

Race details
- Dates: September 29, 2010
- Stages: 1
- Distance: 31.6 km (19.6 mi)
- Winning time: 42' 50.29"

Medalists
	Gold	Taylor Phinney (USA)	(United States)
	Silver	Luke Durbridge (AUS)	(Australia)
	Bronze	Marcel Kittel (GER)	(Germany)

The Men's under-23 time trial of the 2010 UCI Road World Championships cycling event took place on 29 September in Melbourne, Australia.

Taylor Phinney took the United States' first gold medal in the event, since Danny Pate won in Lisbon in 2001, denying Australia's Luke Durbridge by 1.9 seconds, who had been on top for the majority of the event, while Marcel Kittel of Germany took bronze.

== Route ==
The race covered 31.6 km.

== Final classification ==
Rank	Rider	Nation	Time
1	Taylor Phinney	United States	42' 50.29"
2	Luke Durbridge	Australia	+ 1.90"
3	Marcel Kittel	Germany	+ 24.01"
4	Nélson Oliveira	Portugal	+ 27.96"
5	Rohan Dennis	Australia	+ 46.87"
6	Matteo Mammini	Italy	+ 49.88"
7	Tom Dumoulin	Netherlands	+ 1' 06.55"
8	Jesús Herrada	Spain	+ 1' 18.48"
9	Andrei Krasilnikau	Belarus	+ 1' 35.62"
10	Geoffrey Soupe	France	+ 1' 38.21"
11	Johan Le Bon	France	+ 1' 39.62"
12	Jakub Novak	Czech Republic	+ 1' 51.71"
13	Gianluca Leonardi	Italy	+ 2' 04.33"
14	Arthur Van Overberghe	Belgium	+ 2' 13.52"
15	Andrew Talansky	United States	+ 2' 21.59"
16	Ben King	United States	+ 2' 23.32"
17	Jimmi Sørensen	Denmark	+ 2' 27.76"
18	Blaz Jarc	Slovenia	+ 2' 30.13"
19	Javier Eduardo Gómez	Colombia	+ 2' 33.60"
20	Nikita Novikov	Russia	+ 2' 35.56"
21	Piotr Gawronski	Poland	+ 2' 37.49"
22	Sebastian Balck	Sweden	+ 2' 39.43"
23	Shem Rodger	New Zealand	+ 2' 47.53"
24	Daniil Fominykh	Kazakhstan	+ 2' 53.87"
25	David Boily	Canada	+ 3' 06.25"
26	Evgeny Kovalev	Russia	+ 3' 08.95"
27	Martijn Keizer	Netherlands	+ 3' 09.16"
28	Michael Vink	New Zealand	+ 3' 12.82"
29	Evaldas Šiškevičius	Lithuania	+ 3' 15.39"
30	Ramūnas Navardauskas	Lithuania	+ 3' 16.42"
31	Alex Dowsett	Great Britain	+ 3' 25.19"
32	Hugo Houle	Canada	+ 3' 50.01"
33	Fábio Silvestre	Portugal	+ 4' 02.31"
34	Guillaume Van Keirsbulck	Belgium	+ 4' 05.66"
35	Andreas Hofer	Austria	+ 4' 20.12"
36	King Lok Cheung	Hong Kong	+ 4' 24.01"
37	Siarhei Papok	Belarus	+ 4' 46.04"
38	Michał Kwiatkowski	Poland	+ 5' 18.02"
39	Eder Frayre	Mexico	+ 5' 28.75"
40	Silvan Dillier	Switzerland	+ 6' 25.15"
	Rasmus Quaade	Denmark	DNF
