= 2014 Dubai Tour =

UCI Asia Tour
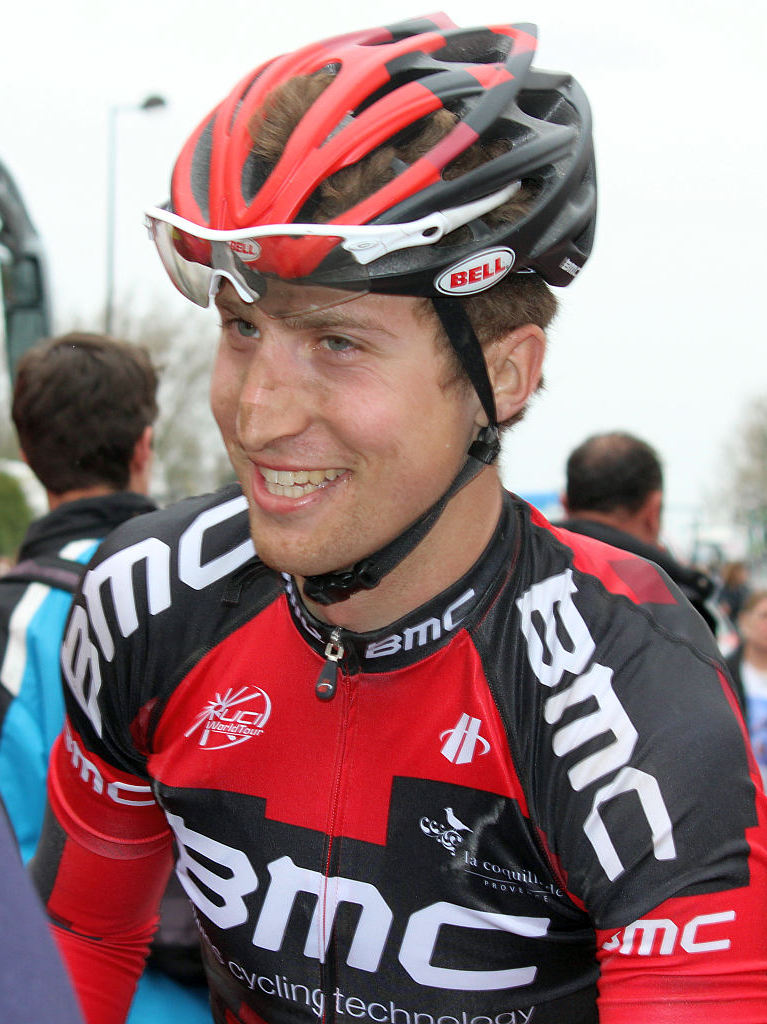
- Taylor Phinney, the winner of the 2014 Dubai Tour

Race details
- Dates: February 5, 2014–February 8, 2014
- Stages: 4
- Distance: 414.5 km (257.6 mi)
- Winning time: 9h 31' 33"

Results
Jersey awarded to the overall winner	Winner	Taylor Phinney (USA)	(BMC)
	Second	Steven Cummings (GBR)	(BMC)
	Third	Lasse Norman Hansen (DEN)	(GRS)
Jersey awarded to the points classification winner	Points	Marcel Kittel (GER)	(GIA)
Jersey awarded to the youth classification winner	Youth	Taylor Phinney (USA)	(BMC)
Jersey awarded to the sprints classification winner	Sprints	Willem Jakobus Smit (RSA)	(VFN)
	Team	BMC Racing Team	

The 2014 Dubai Tour was the first running of the Dubai Tour, organised by RCS Sport and the Dubai Sports Council. It was rated a 2.1 event in the UCI Asia Tour and took place between 5 February and 8 February 2014.

The race consisted of four stages: an individual time trial followed by three stages suited for sprinters. Taylor Phinney won the time trial and the overall title; Marcel Kittel won the other three stages and the points jersey.

== Teams ==
16 teams participated in the race including 11 UCI Pro Tour teams.

- Astana
- BMC Racing Team
- Cannondale
- Garmin–Sharp
- Movistar Team
- Omega Pharma–Quick-Step
- Giant–Shimano
- Team Katusha
- Tinkoff–Saxo
- Lampre–Merida
- Trek Factory Racing
- Vini Fantini–Nippo
- Banco BIC–Carmim
- RTS–Santic Racing Team
- Skydive Dubai Pro Cycling
- United Arab Emirates National Cycling Team

== Stages ==
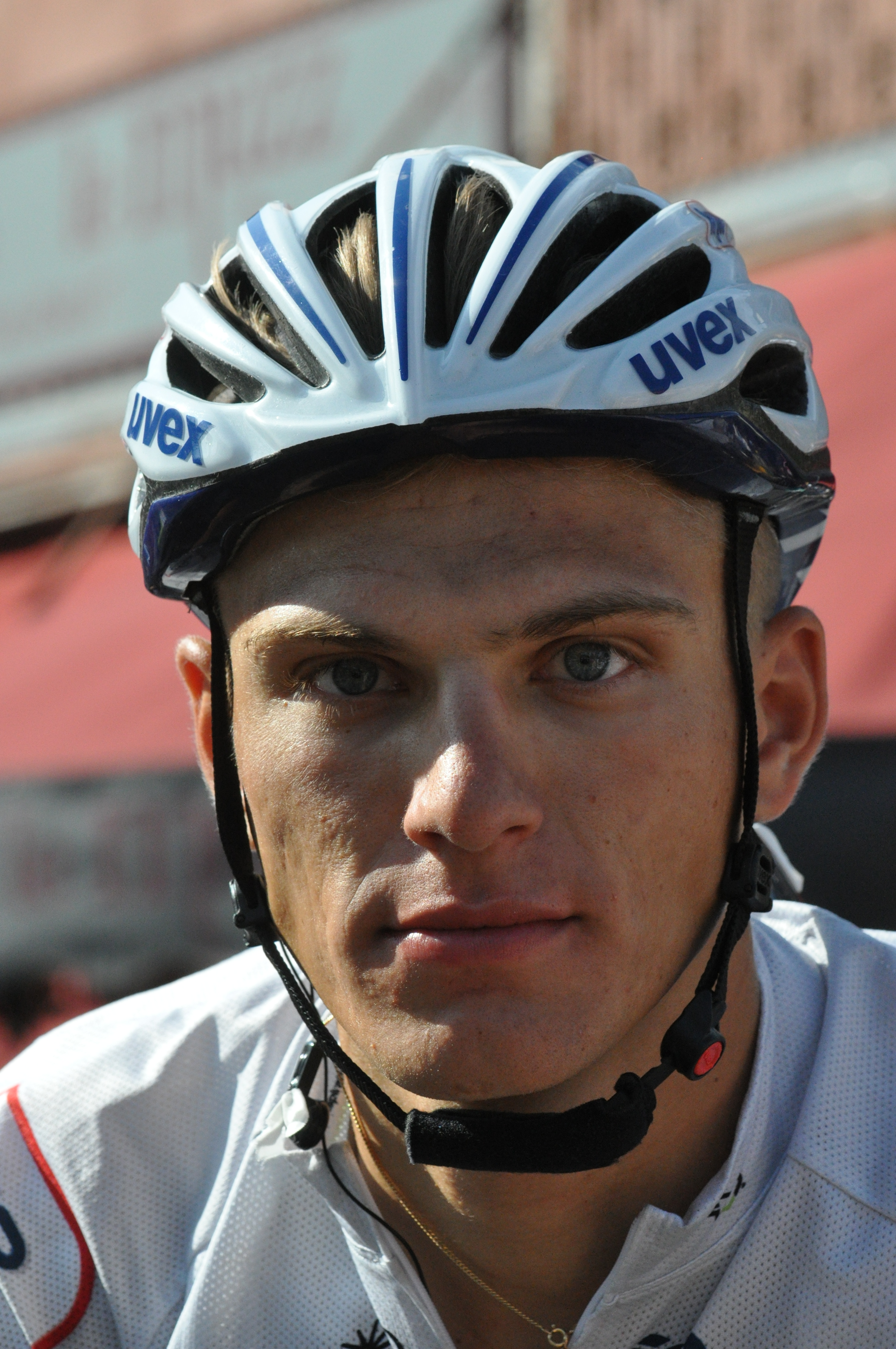
Marcel Kittel, who won three stages

Stage	Date	Course	Distance	Winner	Leader GC
1	Wed 5 February	Dubai – Dubai	10 km (ITT)	Taylor Phinney (USA)	Taylor Phinney (USA)
2	Thur 6 February	Dubai – Atlantis, The Palm	121.6 km	Marcel Kittel (GER)	Taylor Phinney (USA)
3	Fri 7 February	Dubai – Hatta	162.3 km	Marcel Kittel (GER)	Taylor Phinney (USA)
4	Sat 8 February	Dubai – Burj Khalifa	120.5 km	Marcel Kittel (GER)	Taylor Phinney (USA)

== General classification ==
The overall title was won by Taylor Phinney, following his time-trial victory in the first stage.

	Rider	Team	Time
1	Taylor Phinney (USA)	BMC Racing Team	9h 31' 33"
2	Steven Cummings (GBR)	BMC Racing Team	+ 15"
3	Lasse Norman Hansen (DEN)	Garmin–Sharp	+ 17"
4	Tony Martin (GER)	Omega Pharma–Quick-Step	+ 23"
5	Fabian Cancellara (SWI)	Trek Factory Racing	+ 30"
6	Marcel Kittel (GER)	Giant–Shimano	s.t.
7	Adriano Malori (ITA)	Movistar Team	+ 37"
8	Maciej Bodnar (POL)	Cannondale	+ 40"
9	Peter Velits (SVK)	BMC Racing Team	+ 42"
10	Dylan van Baarle (NED)	Garmin–Sharp	s.t.

== Classification leadership table ==
Stage	Winner	General classification	Points classification	Young rider classification
1	Taylor Phinney	Taylor Phinney	Taylor Phinney	Taylor Phinney
2	Marcel Kittel	Taylor Phinney	Marcel Kittel	Taylor Phinney
3	Marcel Kittel	Taylor Phinney	Marcel Kittel	Taylor Phinney
4	Marcel Kittel	Taylor Phinney	Marcel Kittel	Taylor Phinney
Final		Taylor Phinney (USA)	Marcel Kittel (GER)	Taylor Phinney (USA)
