= 2012 Eneco Tour =

2012 UCI World Tour, race 20 of 28

Race details
- Dates: 6–12 August 2012
- Stages: 7
- Distance: 1,040.6 km (646.6 mi)
- Winning time: 24h 51' 13"

Results
Jersey awarded to the overall winner	Winner	Lars Boom (Netherlands)	(Rabobank)
	Second	Sylvain Chavanel (France)	(Omega Pharma–Quick-Step)
	Third	Niki Terpstra (Netherlands)	(Omega Pharma–Quick-Step)
Jersey awarded to the points classification winner	Points	Giacomo Nizzolo (Italy)	(RadioShack–Nissan)
	Team	Omega Pharma–Quick-Step	

The 2012 Eneco Tour was the eighth running of the Eneco Tour cycling stage race. It started on August 6 in Waalwijk in the Netherlands and ended on August 12 in Geraardsbergen, Belgium, after seven stages. It was the 20th race of the 2012 UCI World Tour season.

The race was won by Rabobank rider Lars Boom, who claimed the leader's white jersey on the final day after finishing second to BMC Racing Team rider Alessandro Ballan on the queen stage, and held enough of an advantage to assume the leader's jersey with his result. Boom's winning margin over runner-up Sylvain Chavanel of Omega Pharma–Quick-Step was 26 seconds, and his team-mate Niki Terpstra completed the podium, 23 seconds down on Chavanel and 49 behind Boom. Orica–GreenEDGE rider Svein Tuft had originally finished third on the road, but was given a 20-second penalty for a water bottle infringement.

In the race's other classifications, RadioShack–Nissan's Giacomo Nizzolo won the red jersey for the points classification, after winning a stage during the event, and Laurens De Vreese of Topsport Vlaanderen–Mercator won the "combativity" classification for most points awarded at each of the intermediate sprints during the event. Despite not winning a stage during the event, Omega Pharma–Quick-Step finished at the head of the teams classification, after placing three riders – Chavanel, Terpstra and Michał Kwiatkowski, who was eighth – in the top ten of the final general classification standings.

== Schedule ==
The race consisted of seven stages, including two time trial stages; one individual time trial in Ardooie, and a team time trial, in Sittard. Also included in the parcours for the first time was the Muur van Geraardsbergen, famous for its presence in the Tour of Flanders single-day race.

Stage	Date	Course	Distance	Type	Winner
1	6 August	Waalwijk (Netherlands) to Middelburg (Netherlands)	203.9 km (126.7 mi)	Flat stage	Marcel Kittel (GER)
2	7 August	Sittard (Netherlands) to Sittard (Netherlands)	18.9 km (11.7 mi)	Team time trial	Orica–GreenEDGE
3	8 August	Riemst (Belgium) to Genk (Belgium)	188 km (116.8 mi)	Flat stage	Theo Bos (NED)
4	9 August	Heers (Belgium) to Bergen op Zoom (Netherlands)	213.3 km (132.5 mi)	Flat stage	Marcel Kittel (GER)
5	10 August	Hoogerheide (Netherlands) to Aalter (Belgium)	184.6 km (114.7 mi)	Flat stage	Giacomo Nizzolo (ITA)
6	11 August	Ardooie (Belgium) to Ardooie (Belgium)	17.4 km (10.8 mi)	Individual time trial	Svein Tuft (CAN)
7	12 August	Maldegem (Belgium) to Geraardsbergen (Belgium)	214.5 km (133.3 mi)	Intermediate stage	Alessandro Ballan (ITA)
Total		1,040.6 km (646.6 mi)			

== Participating teams ==
As the Eneco Tour was a UCI World Tour event, all eighteen UCI ProTeams were invited automatically and obligated to send a squad. Three other squads were given wildcard places into the race, and as such, formed the event's 21-team peloton. Among the competitors was Alberto Contador, in his first race since returning from a doping ban.

The twenty-one teams that competed in the race were:

- Accent.jobs–Willems Veranda's
- Ag2r–La Mondiale
- Argos–Shimano
- Astana
- BMC Racing Team
- Euskaltel–Euskadi
- FDJ–BigMat
- Garmin–Sharp
- Team Katusha
- Lampre–ISD
- Liquigas–Cannondale
- Lotto–Belisol
- Movistar Team
- Omega Pharma–Quick-Step
- Orica–GreenEDGE
- Rabobank
- RadioShack–Nissan
- Saxo Bank–Tinkoff Bank
- Team Sky
- Topsport Vlaanderen–Mercator
- Vacansoleil–DCM

== Stages ==
=== Stage 1 ===
6 August 2012 — Waalwijk (Netherlands) to Middelburg (Netherlands), 203.9 km (126.7 mi)

The opening stage saw the riders contest five different intermediate sprints on the route from Waalwijk to Middelburg, with the final two intermediate sprint points – one Eneco Bonisprint in Vrouwenpolder and one Checkpoint Primus sprint, just outside Domburg – coming on a finishing circuit 43.8 km (27.2 mi) in length, around the coast in Zeeland. The finish in Middelburg, and all the later stages, awarded bonus seconds towards the general classification, unlike in previous years. The day's breakaway consisted of a pair of riders as Euskaltel–Euskadi rider Pablo Urtasun was joined at the front by Belgian rider Staf Scheirlinckx, riding for one of the three home wildcard teams, Accent.jobs–Willems Veranda's.

The duo extended their advantage to a maximum of around eight-and-a-half minutes around halfway into the stage, but several teams sent riders to the front of the main field in order to bring back the lead pair towards the peloton before the finishing loop. They ultimately did so, as the leaders were caught 74 km (46.0 mi) prior to the finish, while Rabobank led the field across the finish line for the first time. Topsport Vlaanderen–Mercator's Tim Declercq attacked off the front of the field around halfway through the lap, but was ultimately brought back. A crash in the peloton reduced numbers – to around thirty riders – for the bunch sprint, where Argos–Shimano's Marcel Kittel held off the rest of the field for his first victory since June's Ster ZLM Toer. Kittel finished ahead of FDJ–BigMat rider Arnaud Démare and BMC Racing Team's Taylor Phinney, the 2011 opening stage winner, to the line; the latter sprinting after a mishap with team-mate Adam Blythe, who finished fifth.

Stage 1 Result

	Rider	Team	Time
1	Marcel Kittel (GER)	Argos–Shimano	5h 38' 28"
2	Arnaud Démare (FRA)	FDJ–BigMat	s.t.
3	Taylor Phinney (USA)	BMC Racing Team	s.t.
4	Heinrich Haussler (AUS)	Garmin–Sharp	s.t.
5	Adam Blythe (GBR)	BMC Racing Team	s.t.
6	Michael Van Staeyen (BEL)	Topsport Vlaanderen–Mercator	s.t.
7	José Joaquín Rojas (ESP)	Movistar Team	s.t.
8	Fréderique Robert (BEL)	Lotto–Belisol	s.t.
9	Jacopo Guarnieri (ITA)	Astana	s.t.
10	Giacomo Nizzolo (ITA)	RadioShack–Nissan	s.t.

General Classification after Stage 1

	Rider	Team	Time
1	Marcel Kittel (GER)	Argos–Shimano	5h 38' 18"
2	Arnaud Démare (FRA)	FDJ–BigMat	+ 4"
3	Taylor Phinney (USA)	BMC Racing Team	+ 6"
4	Aidis Kruopis (LTU)	Orica–GreenEDGE	+ 6"
5	Francisco Ventoso (ESP)	Movistar Team	+ 7"
6	Wouter Mol (NED)	Vacansoleil–DCM	+ 8"
7	Luke Rowe (GBR)	Team Sky	+ 8"
8	Robert Wagner (GER)	RadioShack–Nissan	+ 9"
9	Matteo Montaguti (ITA)	Ag2r–La Mondiale	+ 9"
10	Heinrich Haussler (AUS)	Garmin–Sharp	+ 10"

=== Stage 2 ===
7 August 2012 — Sittard (Netherlands), 18.9 km (11.7 mi), team time trial (TTT)

For the first time since the Eneco Tour was established in 2005, one of the race's stages was held as a team time trial; held over 18.9 km (11.7 mi), around the towns of Sittard and Geleen in the Netherlands. However, the stage was predominantly run in the far north-west of Germany, passing through the villages of Tüddern, Höngen, Süsterseel and Hillensberg, where there was a small climb at the intermediate time-point. Much like individual time trial stages, each of the squads set off in reverse order from where they were ranked in the teams general classification at the end of the previous stage, with the exception of Argos–Shimano – seventh in the standings – who started after the classification leaders BMC Racing Team, as Marcel Kittel held the lead of the race overall for Argos–Shimano. Thus, Euskaltel–Euskadi, who were bottom of the classification, after recording the highest cumulative score for their best three riders, were the first team to set off on the stage.

Euskaltel–Euskadi set a time of 22' 18" for the course, with only BMC Racing Team recording a slower time overall, after they were involved in a crash out on the course. Saxo Bank–Tinkoff Bank were the next team to start the stage, and eventually completed the course in a time of 21' 36", some 42 seconds quicker than the time set by Euskaltel–Euskadi. Vacansoleil–DCM recorded a time four seconds off the benchmark set by Saxo Bank–Tinkoff Bank, but RadioShack–Nissan soon topped the timesheets with a time of 21' 27". Their time held until Orica–GreenEDGE came across the line; despite losing three riders from the train, including their highest-placed rider from the previous day, Aidis Kruopis, they still recorded the quickest time by a substantial margin at that point. Their time of 21' 09" was not beaten by the other teams, despite Omega Pharma–Quick-Step, Team Katusha and Rabobank all coming within five seconds of the time, and as such, Jens Keukeleire became the race leader, with four of his team-mates also in the same overall time.

Stage 2 Result

	Team	Time
1	Orica–GreenEDGE	21' 09"
2	Omega Pharma–Quick-Step	+ 1"
3	Team Katusha	+ 2"
4	Rabobank	+ 4"
5	Liquigas–Cannondale	+ 17"
6	RadioShack–Nissan	+ 18"
7	Movistar Team	+ 18"
8	Garmin–Sharp	+ 27"
9	Saxo Bank–Tinkoff Bank	+ 27"
10	Vacansoleil–DCM	+ 31"

General Classification after Stage 2

	Rider	Team	Time
1	Jens Keukeleire (BEL)	Orica–GreenEDGE	5h 59' 37"
2	Sebastian Langeveld (NED)	Orica–GreenEDGE	+ 0"
3	Svein Tuft (CAN)	Orica–GreenEDGE	+ 0"
4	Luke Durbridge (AUS)	Orica–GreenEDGE	+ 0"
5	Jens Mouris (NED)	Orica–GreenEDGE	+ 0"
6	Tom Boonen (BEL)	Omega Pharma–Quick-Step	+ 1"
7	Sylvain Chavanel (FRA)	Omega Pharma–Quick-Step	+ 1"
8	Niki Terpstra (NED)	Omega Pharma–Quick-Step	+ 1"
9	Michał Kwiatkowski (POL)	Omega Pharma–Quick-Step	+ 1"
10	Dries Devenyns (BEL)	Omega Pharma–Quick-Step	+ 1"

=== Stage 3 ===
8 August 2012 — Riemst (Belgium) to Genk (Belgium), 188 km (116.8 mi)

Just as it was the previous day, the majority of the stage was contested in a different country from the start and finish locations. After an opening loop in Belgium, the stage moved into the Netherlands and contested a circuit around the Limburgish town of Valkenburg aan de Geul, the location of the UCI Road World Championships; the circuit included climbs of the Bemelerberg (twice) and the Cauberg – both prominent in the single-day Amstel Gold Race held in the spring – before heading back towards Belgium and the eventual finish to the stage in Genk. A four-rider breakaway was formed in the early kilometres of the stage, consisting of Team Sky's Alex Dowsett, Lampre–ISD rider Matteo Bono, Laurens De Vreese of Topsport Vlaanderen–Mercator and James Vanlandschoot, representing Accent.jobs–Willems Veranda's. They managed to establish a maximum advantage of around five-and-a-half minutes on the peloton, which was led by Orica–GreenEDGE, who were protecting the overall leader of the race, Jens Keukeleire.

With added assistance from the Argos–Shimano team of the points classification leader Marcel Kittel, the advantage that the leaders held was consistently reduced prior to the finishing circuit around Genk, with the advantage cut from its maximum to around a minute before the final loop of 22.7 km (14.1 mi) in length, to curtail the day's proceedings. Halfway around the circuit, the peloton had the lead quartet in their sights with only Vanlandschoot making an effort to remain clear and tried to make a solo attempt to stay off the front until the finish. Vanlandschoot's bid was ultimately unsuccessful, as Rabobank and Lotto–Belisol moved some of their riders forward in the hopes of setting up a sprint finish for their respective sprinters. Saxo Bank–Tinkoff Bank's David Tanner also made a late attack for victory, but he too was unsuccessful; and after Kittel's team changed their focus to setting up John Degenkolb for the victory – after Kittel punctured – it was Rabobank sprinter Theo Bos that crossed the finish line first, for his maiden World Tour victory. Keukeleire finished within the peloton to maintain his overall lead, and was hoping to maintain the lead until Saturday's penultimate stage time trial.

Stage 3 Result

	Rider	Team	Time
1	Theo Bos (NED)	Rabobank	4h 14' 49"
2	John Degenkolb (GER)	Argos–Shimano	s.t.
3	Heinrich Haussler (AUS)	Garmin–Sharp	s.t.
4	Michał Kwiatkowski (POL)	Omega Pharma–Quick-Step	s.t.
5	Manuel Belletti (ITA)	Ag2r–La Mondiale	s.t.
6	Francisco Ventoso (ESP)	Movistar Team	s.t.
7	Alessandro Petacchi (ITA)	Lampre–ISD	s.t.
8	Michael Van Staeyen (BEL)	Topsport Vlaanderen–Mercator	s.t.
9	Alexander Kristoff (NOR)	Team Katusha	s.t.
10	Jacopo Guarnieri (ITA)	Astana	s.t.

General Classification after Stage 3

	Rider	Team	Time
1	Jens Keukeleire (BEL)	Orica–GreenEDGE	10h 14' 26"
2	Sebastian Langeveld (NED)	Orica–GreenEDGE	+ 0"
3	Svein Tuft (CAN)	Orica–GreenEDGE	+ 0"
4	Luke Durbridge (AUS)	Orica–GreenEDGE	+ 0"
5	Jens Mouris (NED)	Orica–GreenEDGE	+ 0"
6	Michał Kwiatkowski (POL)	Omega Pharma–Quick-Step	+ 1"
7	Sylvain Chavanel (FRA)	Omega Pharma–Quick-Step	+ 1"
8	Niki Terpstra (NED)	Omega Pharma–Quick-Step	+ 1"
9	Tom Boonen (BEL)	Omega Pharma–Quick-Step	+ 1"
10	Dries Devenyns (BEL)	Omega Pharma–Quick-Step	+ 1"

=== Stage 4 ===
9 August 2012 — Heers (Belgium) to Bergen op Zoom (Netherlands), 213.3 km (132.5 mi)

The fourth stage of the race was a predominantly flat ride from Heers in the Belgian province of Limburg to Bergen op Zoom in the neighbouring North Brabant province over the border in the Netherlands. The stage itself finished after a closing circuit of 15.4 km (9.6 mi) in length, with bonus seconds on offer at an intermediate sprint point on the first passage of the finish line. Six riders – Vacansoleil–DCM rider Frederik Veuchelen, Euskaltel–Euskadi's Adrián Sáez, Arnoud van Groen (Accent.jobs–Willems Veranda's), Martin Kohler of BMC Racing Team, Gert Dockx for Lotto–Belisol and Boris Shpilevsky representing Ag2r–La Mondiale – went clear in the early kilometres of the stage, and quickly established a substantial lead on the road, reaching a maximum of around eight-and-a-half minutes within the first quarter of the stage.

As it was the previous day, it was Orica–GreenEDGE holding station on the front of the peloton by protecting the leader of the general classification, Jens Keukeleire. The squad brought the time gap down gradually, in order to maintain Keukeleire's lead on the road through the intermediate sprint points of the stage. Topsport Vlaanderen–Mercator, Rabobank and Argos–Shimano all helped out with the chase of the lead sextet, reducing the gap to under a minute inside of 30 km (18.6 mi) remaining of the stage. Veuchelen attacked from the group of six with 20 km (12.4 mi) to go, and maintained a 20-second lead into Bergen op Zoom for the first time; Tom Boonen (Omega Pharma–Quick-Step) beat Rabobank rider Lars Boom to second at the intermediate sprint point, to take the virtual lead of the race from Keukeleire. Veuchelen was swept up by the peloton on the finishing circuit, and it eventually amounted to a bunch sprint for the line; Team Katusha's Alexander Kristoff made his bid first, but ultimately it was Marcel Kittel that took his second victory of the race, ahead of Dockx's team-mate Jürgen Roelandts and Giacomo Nizzolo of RadioShack–Nissan. Boonen finished fourth ahead of Kristoff to take the race lead definitively from Keukeleire.

Stage 4 Result

	Rider	Team	Time
1	Marcel Kittel (GER)	Argos–Shimano	5h 11' 41"
2	Jürgen Roelandts (BEL)	Lotto–Belisol	s.t.
3	Giacomo Nizzolo (ITA)	RadioShack–Nissan	s.t.
4	Tom Boonen (BEL)	Omega Pharma–Quick-Step	s.t.
5	Alexander Kristoff (NOR)	Team Katusha	s.t.
6	Heinrich Haussler (AUS)	Garmin–Sharp	s.t.
7	Jacopo Guarnieri (ITA)	Astana	s.t.
8	Aidis Kruopis (LTU)	Orica–GreenEDGE	s.t.
9	Theo Bos (NED)	Rabobank	s.t.
10	Michael Van Staeyen (BEL)	Topsport Vlaanderen–Mercator	s.t.

General Classification after Stage 4

	Rider	Team	Time
1	Tom Boonen (BEL)	Omega Pharma–Quick-Step	15h 26' 06"
2	Jens Keukeleire (BEL)	Orica–GreenEDGE	+ 1"
3	Sylvain Chavanel (FRA)	Omega Pharma–Quick-Step	+ 2"
4	Niki Terpstra (NED)	Omega Pharma–Quick-Step	+ 2"
5	Alexander Kristoff (NOR)	Team Katusha	+ 3"
6	Lars Boom (NED)	Rabobank	+ 4"
7	Sebastian Langeveld (NED)	Orica–GreenEDGE	+ 6"
8	Luke Durbridge (AUS)	Orica–GreenEDGE	+ 6"
9	Jens Mouris (NED)	Orica–GreenEDGE	+ 6"
10	Svein Tuft (CAN)	Orica–GreenEDGE	+ 6"

=== Stage 5 ===
10 August 2012 — Hoogerheide (Netherlands) to Aalter (Belgium), 184.6 km (114.7 mi)

The final transitional stage of the race saw the peloton start the day in Hoogerheide, best known for its annual World Cup race in the cyclo-cross discipline, before moving back into Belgium before the finish. A finishing loop was once again in place for the closing kilometres of the stage; on this occasion, it was a circuit some 22.4 km (13.9 mi) in length, with bonus seconds once again on offer at the first passage through the finish line in Aalter. A four-rider breakaway was initiated in the early kilometres of the stage; the move consisted of FDJ–BigMat's Mickaël Delage, Accent.jobs–Willems Veranda's rider Sjef De Wilde, Dimitry Muravyev of Astana and Laurens De Vreese representing Topsport Vlaanderen–Mercator, the holder of the black Primus jersey for the leader of the combativity classification awarded for most points at the intermediate sprints. They managed to establish a maximum advantage of over five minutes on the peloton, which was led by Omega Pharma–Quick-Step, who were protecting the overall leader of the race, Tom Boonen.

Delage exited the lead quartet not long after – due to his close proximity to Boonen in the general classification – and left the other three riders to try and extend their lead over the main field as the kilometres passed. With added help from Jens Keukeleire's Orica–GreenEDGE team, the breakaway were not allowed to hold an advantage into the finishing circuit; indeed they were brought back several kilometres before the loop commenced, with Boonen's team-mate Gert Steegmans taking the three bonus seconds on offer for the intermediate sprint, with Keukeleire not attempting to take time at the line. The field remained together until the finish where RadioShack–Nissan's Giacomo Nizzolo just managed to fend off the advances of Lotto–Belisol rider Jürgen Roelandts, to take his third win of the season and his first career World Tour victory, by inches. Boonen maintained his overall lead by finishing fifth on the stage, despite nearly crashing in the closing stages.

Stage 5 Result

	Rider	Team	Time
1	Giacomo Nizzolo (ITA)	RadioShack–Nissan	4h 10' 20"
2	Jürgen Roelandts (BEL)	Lotto–Belisol	s.t.
3	Manuel Belletti (ITA)	Ag2r–La Mondiale	s.t.
4	Arnaud Démare (FRA)	FDJ–BigMat	s.t.
5	Tom Boonen (BEL)	Omega Pharma–Quick-Step	s.t.
6	Alexander Kristoff (NOR)	Team Katusha	s.t.
7	Adam Blythe (GBR)	BMC Racing Team	s.t.
8	José Joaquín Rojas (ESP)	Movistar Team	s.t.
9	Aidis Kruopis (LTU)	Orica–GreenEDGE	s.t.
10	Michael Van Staeyen (BEL)	Topsport Vlaanderen–Mercator	s.t.

General Classification after Stage 5

	Rider	Team	Time
1	Tom Boonen (BEL)	Omega Pharma–Quick-Step	19h 36' 26"
2	Jens Keukeleire (BEL)	Orica–GreenEDGE	+ 1"
3	Sylvain Chavanel (FRA)	Omega Pharma–Quick-Step	+ 2"
4	Niki Terpstra (NED)	Omega Pharma–Quick-Step	+ 2"
5	Alexander Kristoff (NOR)	Team Katusha	+ 3"
6	Lars Boom (NED)	Rabobank	+ 4"
7	Gert Steegmans (BEL)	Omega Pharma–Quick-Step	+ 4"
8	Giacomo Nizzolo (ITA)	RadioShack–Nissan	+ 5"
9	Jens Mouris (NED)	Orica–GreenEDGE	+ 5"
10	Sebastian Langeveld (NED)	Orica–GreenEDGE	+ 6"

=== Stage 6 ===
11 August 2012 — Ardooie (Belgium), 17.4 km (10.8 mi), individual time trial (ITT)

A perfectly flat out-and-back ride around Ardooie was the basis for the penultimate day time trial, covering 17.4 km (10.8 mi) in distance; the time trial was also set to open up time gaps within the top placings in the general classification after each of the mass-start stages provided sprint finishes and the team time trial saw four teams finish within five seconds of one another; the top ten overall were covered by six seconds. As was customary of time trial stages, the riders set off in reverse order from where they were ranked in the general classification at the end of the previous stage. Thus, Adrián Saez of Euskaltel–Euskadi, who, in 158th place – of the 168 starters – trailed overall leader Tom Boonen (Omega Pharma–Quick-Step) by twenty-eight minutes and thirteen seconds, was the first rider to set off on the stage.

Saez set a time outside of 23 minutes for the course, which was almost instantaneously beaten by Boris Shpilevsky of the Ag2r–La Mondiale team, who set a time inside the mark that had been set by Saez. Argos–Shimano rider Albert Timmer and Rick Flens of Rabobank each had spells at the top of the timesheets before Manuele Boaro, riding for Saxo Bank–Tinkoff Bank, stopped the clock for his run in a time of 21' 11". Vacansoleil–DCM rider Thomas De Gendt, who had put in a good closing time trial to seal third in May's Giro d'Italia, got closest to Boaro's time but eventually missed out by around a second. It was not until RadioShack–Nissan's Markel Irizar – who had started almost 45 minutes after Boaro – set the quickest time at the intermediate time-point and eventually recorded the quickest time at the finish, breaking 21 minutes with a time of 20' 57". Irizar held top spot for around another quarter of an hour before Taylor Phinney – winner of the prologue stage at the 2011 race – of the BMC Racing Team surpassed that time by almost half a minute; most of the time gain was achieved in the second half of the course, as he was marginally behind the mark of Irizar at the intermediate time-check, and eventually finished with a time of 20' 30".

Phinney's time was ultimately beaten by only one other rider as Canadian champion Svein Tuft repeated Phinney's achievements; he was also slower than Irizar at the time-check, but saw off Phinney's time by five seconds. Omega Pharma–Quick-Step's Sylvain Chavanel was the only rider to go quicker than Irizar to halfway, but he faded in the second half of the course to a sixth place stage finish, twenty seconds off Tuft's time, and two seconds ahead of Boaro's returning team-mate Alberto Contador, who moved into the top ten overall, having earlier talked down his chances for the stage. Contador moved up at the expense of both Boonen and Keukeleire – the top two heading into the stage – who lost 1' 01" and 1' 08" respectively to Tuft, who took the overall lead. Tuft's lead was four seconds ahead of Rabobank rider Lars Boom, with Chavanel 16 seconds behind Tuft in third.

Stage 6 Result

	Rider	Team	Time
1	Svein Tuft (CAN)	Orica–GreenEDGE	20' 25"
2	Taylor Phinney (USA)	BMC Racing Team	+ 5"
3	Lars Boom (NED)	Rabobank	+ 6"
4	Lieuwe Westra (NED)	Vacansoleil–DCM	+ 18"
5	Adriano Malori (ITA)	Lampre–ISD	+ 19"
6	Sylvain Chavanel (FRA)	Omega Pharma–Quick-Step	+ 20"
7	Alberto Contador (ESP)	Saxo Bank–Tinkoff Bank	+ 22"
8	Luke Durbridge (AUS)	Orica–GreenEDGE	+ 25"
9	Jens Mouris (NED)	Orica–GreenEDGE	+ 26"
10	Jonathan Castroviejo (ESP)	Movistar Team	+ 30"

General Classification after Stage 6

	Rider	Team	Time
1	Svein Tuft (CAN)	Orica–GreenEDGE	19h 56' 57"
2	Lars Boom (NED)	Rabobank	+ 4"
3	Sylvain Chavanel (FRA)	Omega Pharma–Quick-Step	+ 16"
4	Jens Mouris (NED)	Orica–GreenEDGE	+ 25"
5	Luke Durbridge (AUS)	Orica–GreenEDGE	+ 25"
6	Sebastian Langeveld (NED)	Orica–GreenEDGE	+ 37"
7	Niki Terpstra (NED)	Omega Pharma–Quick-Step	+ 39"
8	Michał Kwiatkowski (POL)	Omega Pharma–Quick-Step	+ 47"
9	Jonathan Castroviejo (ESP)	Movistar Team	+ 48"
10	Alberto Contador (ESP)	Saxo Bank–Tinkoff Bank	+ 49"

=== Stage 7 ===
12 August 2012 — Maldegem (Belgium) to Geraardsbergen (Belgium), 214.5 km (133.3 mi)

The final day of the race saw the remaining riders contest the event's queen stage, which would see the overall classification being decided. After a relatively flat opening third to the stage from the start in Maldegem, the remainder of the 214.5 km (133.3 mi) parcours was packed with climbs. In total, there were sixteen climbs with eight climbs being utilised. Of those, one was climbed once – the Hurdumont, with an average gradient of 8% – with six being ascented twice, and the climb that the stage was built around, the Muur van Geraardsbergen, was climbed on three occasions. The stage also finished at the bottom of the Muur van Geraardsbergen – the Wall of Grammont; formerly an iconic part of the Tour of Flanders – on the cobbles of the "vesten" in Geraardsbergen itself.

After a quickly-paced first hour of racing, a nine-rider breakaway formed just after the 40 km (24.9 mi) mark of the stage. Of the nine riders, three – Team Katusha's Pavel Brutt, RadioShack–Nissan rider Linus Gerdemann and Gert Steegmans of Omega Pharma–Quick-Step – were inside of 90 seconds behind the overall leader coming into the stage, Svein Tuft, riding for the Orica–GreenEDGE team. As a result, the peloton did not allow for the lead group to extend a substantial advantage over themselves; indeed, it remained below three minutes for the entire stage. Tuft and Steegmans' team-mate Tom Boonen, the winner of the Muur-less Tour of Flanders earlier in the season both suffered punctures within the peloton as the gap was closing, but both were eventually able to rejoin the main field after several kilometres of chasing. Tuft would later cost himself a chance of third place overall; he received a 20-second time penalty for taking a water bottle inside of the final 20 km (12.4 mi) of the stage.

The lead group was brought back by the time the riders climbed the Muur for the second time. BMC Racing Team's Marcus Burghardt, a breakaway member, again attacked on the Muur and took several riders with him, including Alberto Contador of Saxo Bank–Tinkoff Bank, who had been inside the top ten of the general classification overnight. The move was quickly shut down but Jan Bakelants of RadioShack–Nissan soon counter-attacked and managed to achieve a buffer of around 40 seconds with 12 km (7.5 mi) remaining. Bakelants stayed off the front until the final Muur climb, but provided Burghardt's team-mate, Alessandro Ballan – winner of the 2007 Tour of Flanders – with the ammunition to attack. He was joined on the descent by Rabobank rider Lars Boom, who in second place overall at four seconds behind Tuft, provided the race-deciding move. Ballan and Boom stayed away until the end; Ballan celebrated the stage victory, while Boom did likewise for the overall win. Boom later praised the organisers for using the Muur, and hoped it would remain in the race for the foreseeable future.

Stage 7 Result

	Rider	Team	Time
1	Alessandro Ballan (ITA)	BMC Racing Team	4h 54' 16"
2	Lars Boom (NED)	Rabobank	+ 2"
3	Francisco Ventoso (ESP)	Movistar Team	+ 6"
4	Nick Nuyens (BEL)	Saxo Bank–Tinkoff Bank	+ 6"
5	Marco Marcato (ITA)	Vacansoleil–DCM	+ 6"
6	Diego Ulissi (ITA)	Lampre–ISD	+ 6"
7	Tony Gallopin (FRA)	RadioShack–Nissan	+ 6"
8	Alberto Contador (ESP)	Saxo Bank–Tinkoff Bank	+ 6"
9	Laurens De Vreese (BEL)	Topsport Vlaanderen–Mercator	+ 10"
10	Niki Terpstra (NED)	Omega Pharma–Quick-Step	+ 10"

Final General Classification

	Rider	Team	Time
1	Lars Boom (NED)	Rabobank	24h 51' 13"
2	Sylvain Chavanel (FRA)	Omega Pharma–Quick-Step	+ 26"
3	Niki Terpstra (NED)	Omega Pharma–Quick-Step	+ 49"
4	Alberto Contador (ESP)	Saxo Bank–Tinkoff Bank	+ 55"
5	Luke Durbridge (AUS)	Orica–GreenEDGE	+ 55"
6	Jonathan Castroviejo (ESP)	Movistar Team	+ 58"
7	Svein Tuft (CAN)	Orica–GreenEDGE	+ 1' 00"
8	Michał Kwiatkowski (POL)	Omega Pharma–Quick-Step	+ 1' 05"
9	Sebastian Langeveld (NED)	Orica–GreenEDGE	+ 1' 07"
10	Jan Bakelants (BEL)	RadioShack–Nissan	+ 1' 13"

== Classification leadership table ==
Stage	Winner	General classification	Points classification	Combativity Classification	Team classification
1	Marcel Kittel	Marcel Kittel	Marcel Kittel	Pablo Urtasun	BMC Racing Team
2	Orica–GreenEDGE	Jens Keukeleire	Marcel Kittel	Pablo Urtasun	Orica–GreenEDGE
3	Theo Bos	Jens Keukeleire	Heinrich Haussler	Laurens De Vreese	Orica–GreenEDGE
4	Marcel Kittel	Tom Boonen	Marcel Kittel	Laurens De Vreese	Orica–GreenEDGE
5	Giacomo Nizzolo	Tom Boonen	Giacomo Nizzolo	Laurens De Vreese	Orica–GreenEDGE
6	Svein Tuft	Svein Tuft	Giacomo Nizzolo	Laurens De Vreese	Orica–GreenEDGE
7	Alessandro Ballan	Lars Boom	Giacomo Nizzolo	Laurens De Vreese	Omega Pharma–Quick-Step
Final		Lars Boom	Giacomo Nizzolo	Laurens De Vreese	Omega Pharma–Quick-Step
