= 2009 UCI Track Cycling World Championships – Men's individual pursuit =

Men's individual pursuit at the 2009 UCI Track Cycling World Championships
- Venue: BGŻ Arena
- Location: Pruszków, Poland
- Date: 26 March 2009
- Winning time: 4:17.631

Medalists
gold medal	Taylor Phinney	United States
silver medal	Jack Bobridge	Australia
bronze medal	Dominique Cornu	Belgium

The Men's individual pursuit event of the 2009 UCI Track Cycling World Championships was held on 26 March 2009.

== Results ==
=== Qualifying ===
Rank	Name	Nation	1000 m	2000 m	3000 m	Time	Speed (km/h)	Note
1	Taylor Phinney	United States	1:07.850 (4)	2:10.734 (3)	3:12.293 (1)	04:15.160	56.435	Q
2	Jack Bobridge	Australia	1:07.306 (2)	2:09.347 (2)	3:13.359 (2)	04:17.419	55.939	Q
3	Dominique Cornu	Belgium	1:08.347 (7)	2:11.952 (6)	3:15.745 (5)	04:19.197	55.556	q
4	Volodymyr Diudia	Ukraine	1:06.792 (1)	2:09.090 (1)	3:13.623 (3)	04:19.786	55.43	q
5	Jesse Sergent	New Zealand	1:07.596 (3)	2:11.079 (4)	3:15.284 (4)	04:21.253	55.118	
6	Sergi Escobar Roure	Spain	1:08.284 (6)	2:11.646 (5)	3:16.820 (6)	04:23.619	54.624	
7	Alexei Markov	Russia	1:09.207 (11)	2:13.111 (9)	3:18.140 (8)	04:24.085	54.527	
8	Patrick Gretsch	Germany	1:09.075 (9)	2:14.758 (12)	3:20.514 (10)	04:24.564	54.429	
9	Robert Bartko	Germany	1:09.975 (17)	2:16.063 (15)	3:20.823 (12)	04:26.277	54.079	
10	Vitaliy Shchedov	Ukraine	1:08.234 (5)	2:11.963 (7)	3:17.344 (7)	04:26.508	54.032	
11	Antonio Tauler Llull	Spain	1:09.089 (10)	2:12.710 (8)	3:18.193 (9)	04:26.681	53.997	
12	Arles Castro	Colombia	1:09.033 (8)	2:14.273 (10)	3:20.806 (11)	04:27.750	53.781	
13	Levi Heimans	Netherlands	1:09.904 (16)	2:14.834 (13)	3:20.967 (13)	04:28.638	53.603	
14	Ingmar De Poortere	Belgium	1:10.132 (18)	2:14.915 (14)	3:21.270 (14)	04:30.089	53.315	
15	David O'Loughlin	Ireland	1:09.367 (12)	2:14.640 (11)	3:23.064 (16)	04:32.480	52.847	
16	Arnaud Depreeuw	France	1:09.659 (14)	2:16.334 (16)	3:23.569 (17)	04:32.559	52.832	
17	Valery Kaikov	Russia	1:09.730 (15)	2:16.478 (17)	3:22.025 (15)	04:32.612	52.822	
18	Alessandro De Marchi	Italy	1:12.167 (19)	2:18.957 (19)	3:26.970 (18)	04:35.916	52.189	
19	Jiri Bares	Czech Republic	1:09.385 (13)	2:18.563 (18)	3:28.709 (19)	04:39.614	51.499	
20	Alexey Lyalko	Kazakhstan	1:13.573 (20)	2:23.858 (20)	3:34.161 (20)	04:43.885	50.724	
-	Adrian Kurek	Poland				DSQ		

=== Finals ===
Rank	Name	Nation	1000 m	2000 m	3000 m	Time	Speed (km/h)
Bronze medal race
1	Dominique Cornu	Belgium	1:07.949 (1)	2:11.271 (1)	3:16.188 (1)	04:22.347	54.889
2	Volodymyr Diudia	Ukraine	1:08.944 (2)	2:13.479 (2)	3:20.206 (2)	04:28.297	53.671
Gold medal race
1	Taylor Phinney	United States	1:07.901 (1)	2:11.832 (2)	3:14.891 (1)	04:17.631	55.893
2	Jack Bobridge	Australia	1:08.256 (2)	2:11.797 (1)	3:15.437 (2)	04:20.091	55.365

== Final classification ==
Rank	Name	
1	Taylor Phinney	United States
2	Jack Bobridge	Australia
3	Dominique Cornu	Belgium
4	Volodymyr Diudia	Ukraine
5	Jesse Sergent	New Zealand
6	Sergi Escobar Roure	Spain
7	Alexei Markov	Russia
8	Patrick Gretsch	Germany
9	Robert Bartko	Germany
10	Vitaliy Shchedov	Ukraine
11	Antonio Tauler Llull	Spain
12	Arles Castro	Colombia
13	Levi Heimans	Netherlands
14	Ingmar De Poortere	Belgium
15	David O'Loughlin	Ireland
16	Arnaud Depreeuw	France
17	Valery Kaikov	Russia
18	Alessandro De Marchi	Italy
19	Jiri Bares	Czech Republic
20	Alexey Lyalko	Kazakhstan
