= Symmetrics =

Symmetrics Professional Cycling Team
Team information
- UCI code: SYM
- Registered: Canada
- Founded: 2005
- Disbanded: 2008
- Discipline: Road
- Status: UCI Continental

Key personnel
- General manager: Kevin Cunningham
- Team manager: Kevin Field

Team name history
Symmetrics jersey
Jersey

Symmetrics Professional Cycling Team (UCI team code: SYM) was a Canadian UCI Continental cycling team, active until 2008, focusing on road bicycle racing and title sponsored by Symmetrics, a Canadian-based computer software company. The team is owned by brothers Kevin and Mark Cunningham with assistance from directeur sportif Kevin Field. The Cunninghams are entrepreneurs, owners of multiple businesses and lead sponsors of the team with their respective companies Westlam and Symmetrics. The team won the 2007 UCI America Tour teams classification, while team member Svein Tuft won the UCI America Tour Individual Classification.

== 2008 roster ==
As of 20 June 2008.

Rider	Date of birth
Ryan Anderson (CAN)	22 July 1987 (age 39)
Zach Bell (CAN)	14 November 1982 (age 43)
Brandon Crichton (CAN)	22 February 1985 (age 41)
Jacob Erker (CAN)	22 December 1975 (age 50)
Cameron Evans (CAN)	10 January 1984 (age 42)
Geoff Kabush (CAN)	14 April 1977 (age 49)

Rider	Date of birth
Christian Meier (CAN)	21 February 1985 (age 41)
Andrew Pinfold (CAN)	14 August 1978 (age 48)
Andrew Randell (CAN)	4 July 1974 (age 52)
Will Routley (CAN)	23 May 1983 (age 43)
Jeff Sherstobitoff (CAN)	17 June 1982 (age 44)
Svein Tuft (CAN)	9 May 1977 (age 49)
Eric Wohlberg (CAN)	8 January 1965 (age 61)

== Major wins ==
=== 2008 ===
==== Pan American Road and Track Championships (Montevideo, Uruguay) ====
- 1st, 2008 Pan American Road and Track Championships, Individual Time Trial (Svein Tuft)
- 1st, 2008 Pan American Road and Track Championships, Madison (Zach Bell, Svein Tuftt)
- 1st, 2008 Pan American Road and Track Championships, Points Race (Svein Tuft)
- 1st, 2008 Pan American Road and Track Championships, Individual Pursuit (Svein Tuft)

==== Canadian national championships ====
- 1st, Canadian Championships - Elite Road Race (Christian Meier)
- 1st, Canadian Championships - Time Trial (Svein Tuft)
- 1st, Individual Pursuit - Track Championships (Svein Tuft)
- 1st, Points Race - Track Championships (Zach Bell)

==== Other Major 2008 Results ====
- 1st, Prologue Mad River Glen Green Mountain Stage Race (Andrew Randell)
- 1st, Stage 4 Tour de la Guadeloupe (Cameron Evans)
- 1st, in Stages 1 and 2 Tour de White Rock (Andrew Pinfold)
- 1st, Giro di Burnaby (Andrew Pinfold)
- 1st, Tour of Gastown (Andrew Pinfold)
- 1st, Overall GC Tour de Delta (Zach Bell)
- 1st, in stages 1,2 and 3 Tour de Delta (Svein Tuft, Cameron Evans, Andrew Pinfold)
- 1st, Elkhorn Stage Race (Will Routley)
- 1st, Stage 4 Tour de Nez (Eric Wohlberg)
- 1st, Premier etape Mardis Cycliste de Lachine, Montreal Canada (Zach Bell)
- 1st, 2008 Tour de Beauce Overall, Canada (Svein Tuft)
- 1st, stage 4A Tour de Beauce, St. Georges Canada (Svein Tuft)
- 1st, 2008 Westside Classic Road Race, Vancouver Canada (Cameron Evans)
- 1st, St. Lawrence Market Criterium, Toronto Canada (Andrew Pinfold)
- 1st, 2008 MERCO Classic Road Race, California (Eric Wohlberg)
- 1st, 2008 San Dimas Stage Race, California (Cameron Evans)
- 1st, stage 5 2008 Mount Hood Classic Stage Race (Andrew Pinfold)

=== 2007 ===
- 1st, 2007 UCI America Tour, Individual (Svein Tuft)
- 1st, 2007 UCI America Tour, Team
- 1st, 2007 US Open, Richmond Virginia (Svein Tuft)
- 1st, 2007 Vuelta a Cuba (Svein Tuft)
- 1st, 2007 Canadian Championships, Road Race (Cameron Evans)
- 1st, 2007 Canadian Championships, Espoir Road Race (Christian Meier)
