= Bram de Kort =

Dutch cyclist

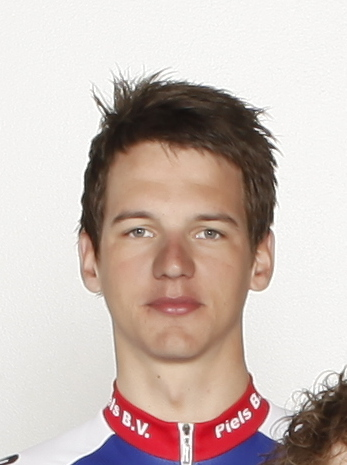
- De Kort in 2013

Personal information
- Born: 7 June 1991 (age 35) Dongen, Netherlands

Cycling career
- Sport: Cycling
- Role: Rider

Bram de Kort (born 7 June 1991) is a Dutch racing cyclist. He rode at the 2013 UCI Road World Championships.
