= Cristiano Monguzzi =

Italian cyclist

Personal information
- Born: 31 August 1985 (age 41) Milan, Italy

Cycling career
- Sport: Cycling
- Current team: Retired
- Discipline: Road
- Role: Rider

Amateur teams
- 2007: C.C. Cremonese Arvedi Unidelta
- 2008: Eurobike OliverOgar
- 2009–2011: Team Aurora Named–M.I. Impianti

Professional teams
- 2012: Utensilnord–Named
- 2012–2013: Farnese Vini–Selle Italia
- 2015: Meridiana–Kamen

Cristiano Monguzzi (born 31 August 1985) is an Italian former racing cyclist. He rode at the 2013 UCI Road World Championships, in the men's team time trial for Vini Fantini–Selle Italia.

== Major results ==
2007
7th Trofeo Banca Popolare di Vicenza
2008
7th Trofeo Franco Balestra
2010
10th Trofeo Zsšdi
2011
1st Piccolo Giro di Lombardia
2013
1st Stage 10 Vuelta al Táchira
7th Overall Tour of Japan
8th Overall Tour de Kumano
2015
10th Tour de Berne
