= Ábel Kenyeres =

Hungarian cyclist

Personal information
- Born: 14 February 1994 (age 32) Hungary

Cycling career
- Sport: Cycling
- Role: Rider

Ábel Kenyeres (born 14 February 1994) is a Hungarian racing cyclist. He rode at the 2013 UCI Road World Championships.
