= Luke Durbridge =

Australian racing cyclist

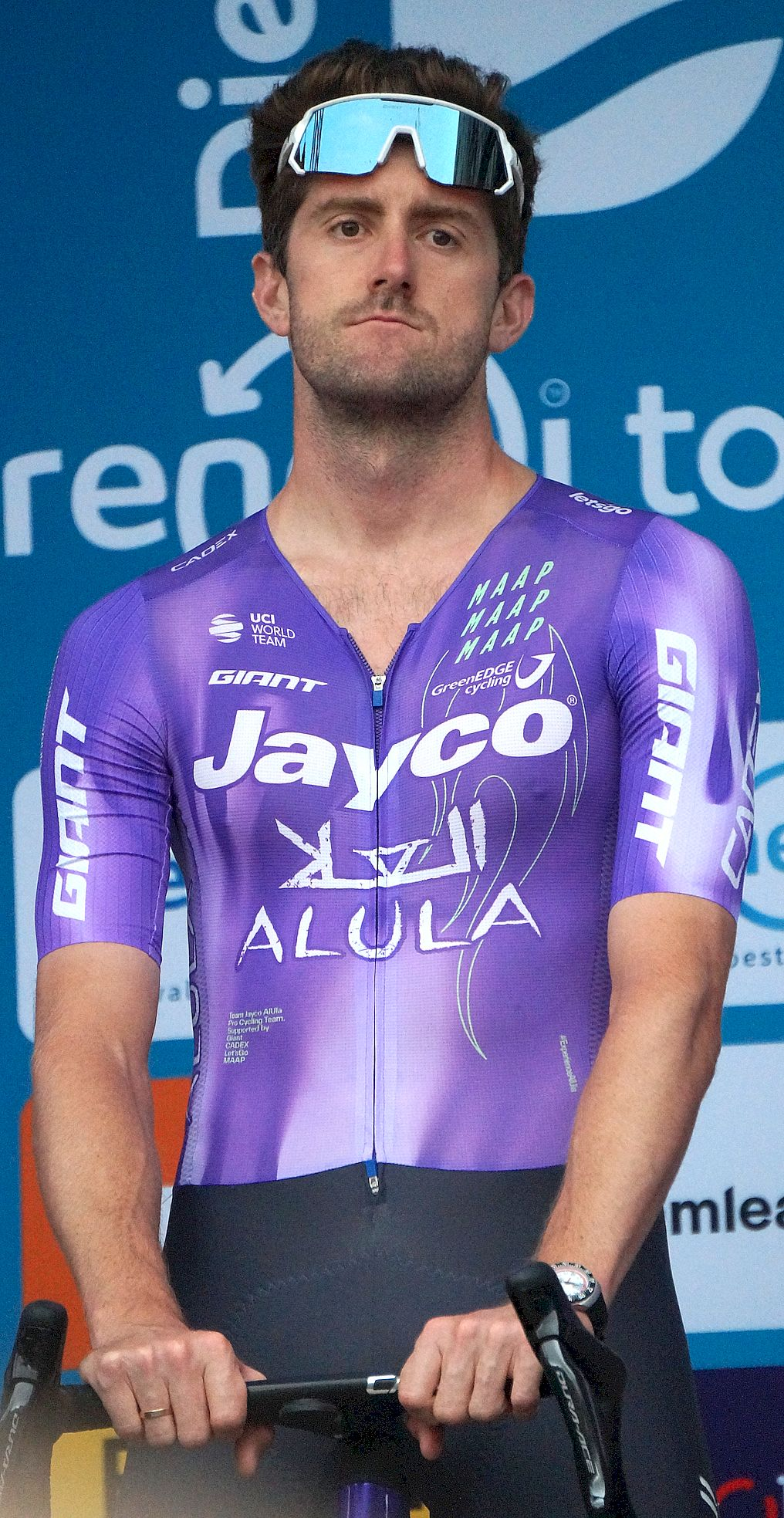
- Durbridge in 2026

Personal information
- Full name: Luke Durbridge
- Nickname: Turbo Durbo
- Born: 9 April 1991 (age 35) Greenmount, Western Australia, Australia
- Height: 1.87 m (6 ft 1 1/2 in)
- Weight: 78 kg (172 lb; 12 st 4 lb)

Cycling career
- Sport: Cycling
- Current team: Team Jayco–AlUla
- Disciplines: Road; Track
- Role: Rider
- Rider type: Classics specialist Time trialist

Professional teams
- 2010–2011: Team Jayco–Skins
- 2012–: GreenEDGE

Major wins
- Grand Tours Giro d'Italia 2 TTT stages (2014, 2015) One-day races and Classics National Road Race Championships (2013, 2025) National Time Trial Championships (2012, 2013, 2019, 2020)
Medal record
Representing Australia
Men's road bicycle racing
World Championships
Gold medal – first place	2011 Copenhagen	Under-23 time trial
Silver medal – second place	2010 Melbourne	Under-23 time trial
Bronze medal – third place	2022 Wollongong	Mixed team relay
Commonwealth Games
Bronze medal – third place	2010 Delhi	Time trial
Men's track cycling
World Championships
Gold medal – first place	2011 Apeldoorn	Team pursuit
Representing Orica–GreenEDGE (2012–14) Orica–BikeExchange (2016)
Men's road bicycle racing
World Championships
Silver medal – second place	2013 Tuscany	Team time trial
Silver medal – second place	2014 Ponferrada	Team time trial
Bronze medal – third place	2012 Valkenburg	Team time trial
Bronze medal – third place	2016 Doha	Team time trial

Luke Durbridge (born 9 April 1991) is an Australian road and track cyclist, who currently rides for UCI WorldTeam Team Jayco–AlUla. Durbridge specialises in the individual time trial, road races, and various track cycling events.

As well as winning the 2012 Australian National Time Trial Championships, Durbridge won both the time trial and the Australian National Road Race Championships in 2013. As a result, he became the first rider to win both titles in the same year at an elite level, Jonathan Hall had previously won both in 1997 but not at an elite level.

== Early career ==
Durbridge was born in Greenmount, Western Australia, and started cycling at 14 years of age, competing in triathlons. In 2009 he became the World Junior Individual Time Trial Champion at the UCI Juniors World Championships in Moscow, Russia; he also won gold in the World Junior Madison Championship. In 2010 he became the youngest ever medal winner in the U23 Individual time trial event of the UCI Road World Championships.

== Professional road career ==
Durbridge joined the GreenEDGE team ahead of the 2012 season, which coincided with him being dropped from the Australian track team. After winning the under-23 national time trial title in 2011, Durbridge became the elite national champion in January 2012, beating teammate and two-time defending champion Cameron Meyer by almost seven seconds. His first professional win came in April 2012, taking the overall title at the Circuit de la Sarthe despite being left with only two teammates for the final stage. In June he unexpectedly won the prologue of the Critérium du Dauphiné, beating Bradley Wiggins and world time trial champion Tony Martin. He subsequently finished fifth in the Eneco Tour before taking his second general classification win of the year at the 2.1-category Tour du Poitou-Charentes.

In 2021, Durbridge rode in the Olympic road race for the first time at the COVID-19 pandemic-delayed 2020 Summer Olympics in Tokyo, where he finished in 72nd place.

== Major results ==
=== Road ===
2009
1st Time trial, UCI World Junior Championships
National Junior Championships

1st Time trial
4th Road race

2010
1st Overall Mersey Valley Tour

1st Prologue

1st Memorial Davide Fardelli
1st Stage 1 (TTT) Thüringen Rundfahrt der U23
2nd Time trial, UCI World Under-23 Championships
2nd Time trial, National Under-23 Championships
3rd Time trial, Commonwealth Games
3rd Chrono Champenois
2011
1st Time trial, UCI World Under-23 Championships
1st Time trial, National Under-23 Championships
1st Chrono Champenois
3rd Memorial Davide Fardelli
7th Overall Olympia's Tour

1st Prologue & Stage 5 (ITT)

2012 (6 pro wins)
1st Time trial, National Championships
1st Overall Circuit de la Sarthe

1st Young rider classification
1st Stage 3 (ITT)

1st Overall Tour du Poitou-Charentes

1st Young rider classification
1st Stage 4 (ITT)

1st Prologue Critérium du Dauphiné
1st Duo Normand (with Svein Tuft)
3rd Team time trial, UCI World Championships
5th Overall Eneco Tour

1st Stage 2 (TTT)

7th Overall Three Days of De Panne
2013 (3)
National Championships

1st Road race
1st Time trial

1st Duo Normand (with Svein Tuft)
1st Bay Classic Series
1st Stage 3 (ITT) Circuit de la Sarthe
2nd Team time trial, UCI World Championships
6th Overall Tour du Poitou-Charentes
7th Overall Three Days of De Panne
2014 (1)
Oceania Championships

1st Road race
8th Time trial

Giro d'Italia

1st Stage 1 (TTT)
Held after Stage 1

2nd Team time trial, UCI World Championships
2nd Time trial, National Championships
2nd Overall Three Days of De Panne
9th Time trial, Commonwealth Games
2015
1st Stage 1 (TTT) Giro d'Italia
4th Time trial, National Championships
7th Overall Three Days of De Panne
2016
1st Duo Normand (with Svein Tuft)
3rd Team time trial, UCI World Championships
6th Overall Three Days of De Panne
2017 (1)
1st Stage 3b (ITT) Three Days of De Panne
2nd Time trial, National Championships
4th Dwars door Vlaanderen
4th E3 Harelbeke
6th Strade Bianche
2018
2nd Time trial, National Championships
Combativity award Stage 18 Tour de France
2019 (1)
National Championships

1st Time trial
4th Road race

1st Stage 1 (TTT) Tirreno–Adriatico
1st Stage 1 (TTT) Czech Cycling Tour
2020 (1)
National Championships

1st Time trial
4th Road race

1st Stage 1 (TTT) Czech Cycling Tour
2021
1st Overall Santos Festival of Cycling

1st Stage 1

2nd Time trial, National Championships
6th Overall Benelux Tour
2022
2nd Time trial, National Championships
3rd Team relay, UCI World Championships
2023
2nd Time trial, National Championships
2025 (1)
1st Road race, National Championships

==== Grand Tour general classification results timeline ====
Grand Tour	2013	2014	2015	2016	2017	2018	2019	2020	2021	2022	2023	2024	2025
Giro d'Italia	142	DNF	109	—	—	—	78	—	—	—	—	—	—
Tour de France	—	122	151	112	DNF	118	109	—	100	DNF	130	123	137
Vuelta a España	—	—	—	—	—	—	—	—	—	112	—	—	—

Legend
—	Did not compete
DNF	Did not finish
IP	In progress

=== Track ===
2008
UCI World Junior Championships

1st Team pursuit
3rd Points race

1st Team pursuit, UCI World Cup Classics, Melbourne
2009
UCI World Junior Championships

1st Madison (with Alex Carver)
2nd Team pursuit

1st Team pursuit, National Championships
1st Team pursuit, UCI World Cup Classics, Melbourne
2010
National Championships

2nd Team pursuit
2nd Points race

2011
1st Team pursuit, UCI World Championships
1st Points race, National Championships
