= Bradley Potgieter =

South African cyclist

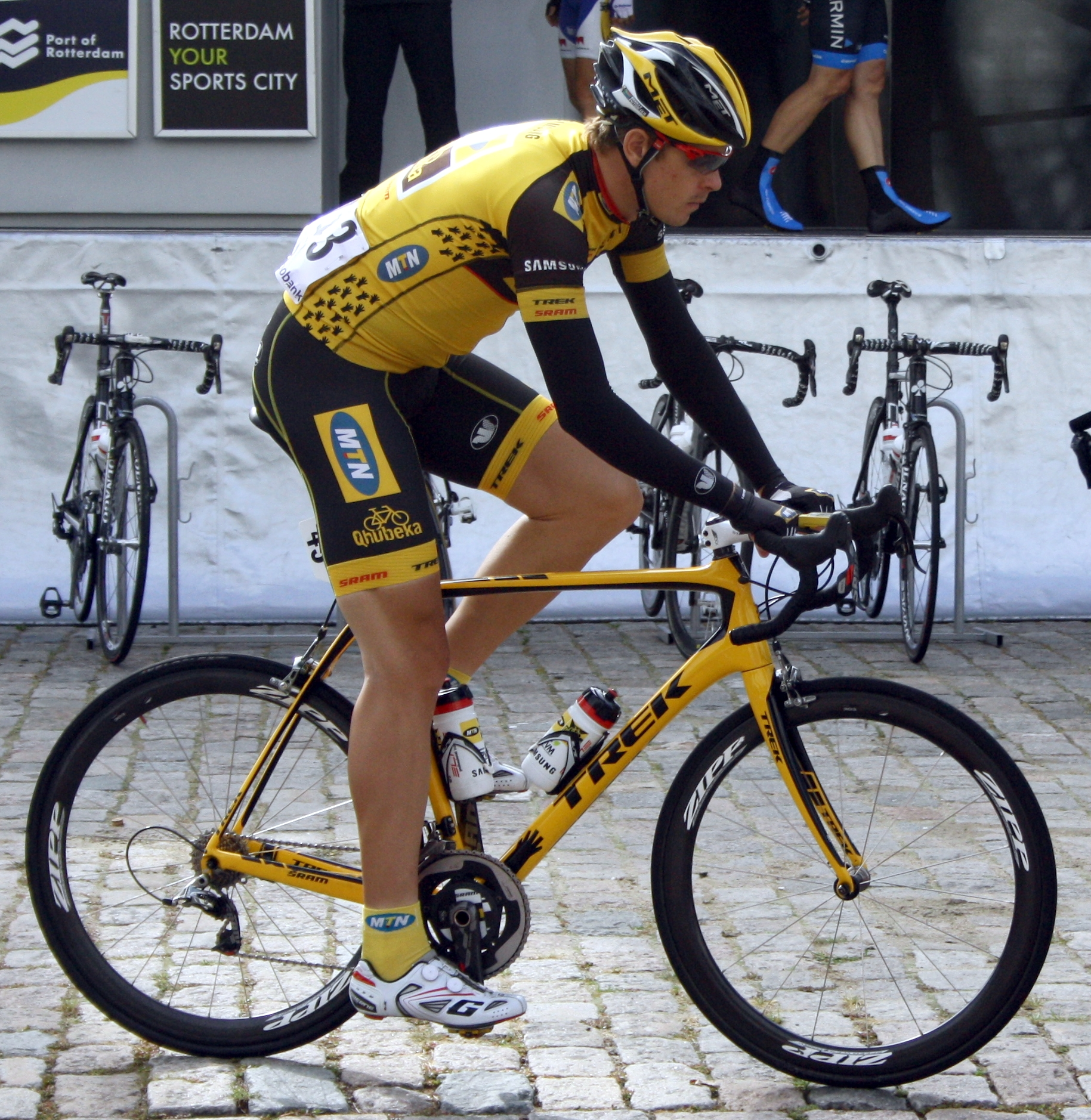
- Potgieter in 2013

Personal information
- Born: 11 May 1989 (age 37) Pietermaritzburg, South Africa

Cycling career
- Sport: Cycling
- Role: Rider

Bradley Potgieter (born 11 May 1989) is a South African racing cyclist. He rode at the 2013 UCI Road World Championships.

== Major results ==
2007
3rd Gent-Menen
2013
1st Stage 5 (TTT) Tour de Korea
