= Svein Tuft =

Canadian cyclist

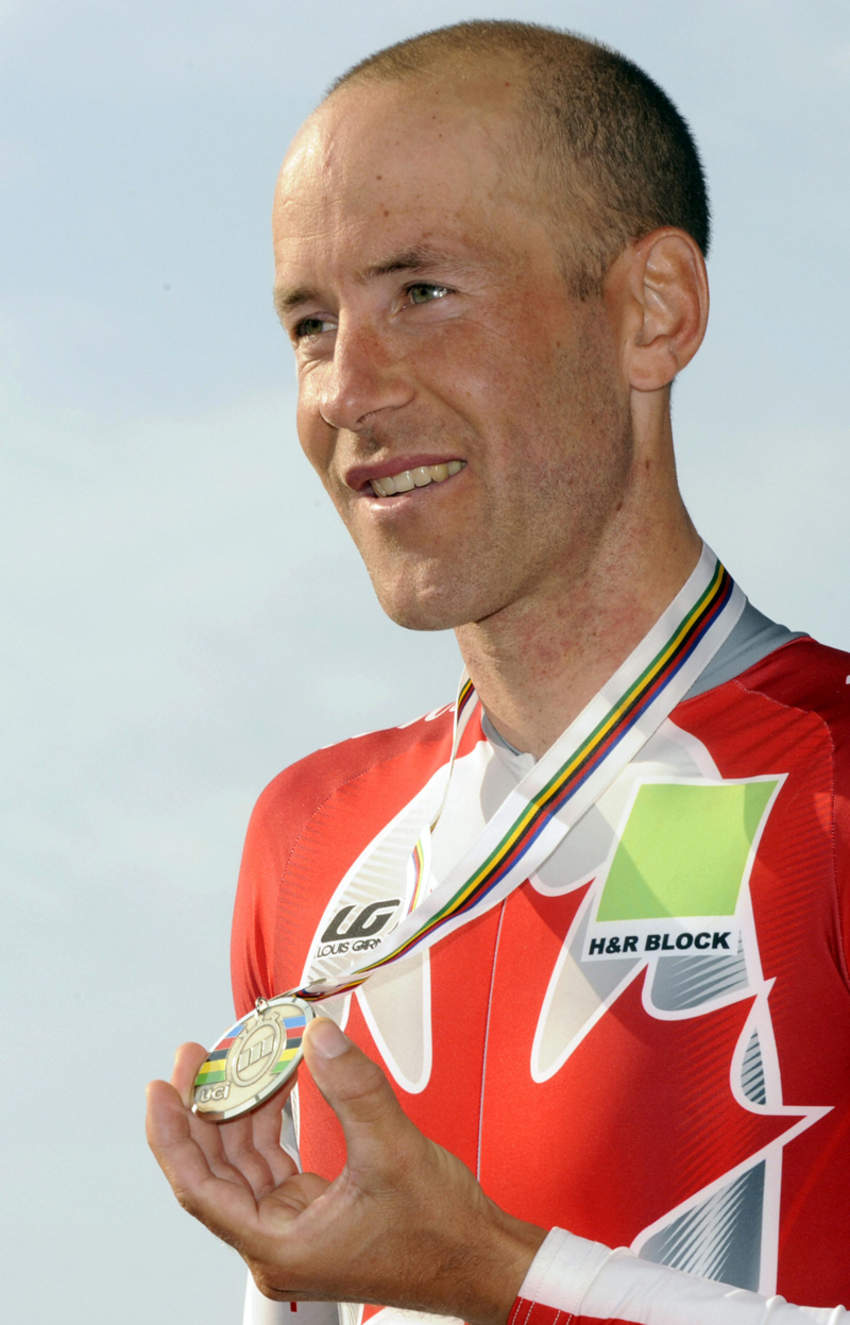
- Tuft at the 2008 UCI Road World Championships.

Personal information
- Full name: Svein Tuft
- Nickname: Sveino
- Born: May 9, 1977 (age 49) Langley, British Columbia, Canada
- Height: 1.80 m (5 ft 11 in)
- Weight: 74 kg (163 lb; 11.7 st)

Cycling career
- Sport: Cycling
- Current team: Retired
- Discipline: Road
- Role: Rider
- Rider type: Domestique; Time trialist

Amateur teams
- 2001: Mercury–Viatel (stagiaire)
- 2004: Symmetrics

Professional teams
- 2002–2003: Prime Alliance Cycling Team
- 2005–2008: Symmetrics
- 2009–2010: Garmin–Slipstream
- 2011: SpiderTech–C10
- 2012–2018: GreenEDGE
- 2019: Rally UHC Cycling

Major wins
- Grand Tours Tour de France 1 TTT stage (2013) Giro d'Italia 1 TTT stage (2014) One-day races and Classics National Road Race Championships (2011, 2014) National Time Trial Championships (11 times) (Note: Tuft won the Canadian National Time Trial Championships in 2004, 2005, 2006, 2008, 2009, 2010, 2011, 2012, 2014, 2017 and 2018.) Other UCI America Tour (2006–07)
Medal record
Men's road bicycle racing
Representing Canada
World Championships
Silver medal – second place	2008 Varese	Time trial
Pan American Championships
Gold medal – first place	2008 Montevideo	Time trial
Representing Orica–GreenEDGE
World Championships
Silver medal – second place	2013 Tuscany	Team time trial
Silver medal – second place	2014 Ponferrada	Team time trial
Bronze medal – third place	2012 Valkenburg	Team time trial
Representing Orica–BikeExchange
World Championships
Bronze medal – third place	2016 Doha	Team time trial

Svein Tuft (born May 9, 1977) is a Canadian former road bicycle racer, who rode professionally between 2005 and 2019 for the Symmetrics, Garmin–Transitions, SpiderTech–C10, Mitchelton–Scott and Rally UHC Cycling teams. Tuft was the winner of the 2006–07 UCI America Tour, and was a thirteen-time champion at the Canadian road cycling championships: twice in the road race, and eleven times in the time trial.

== Personal life ==
He was born in Langley, British Columbia, Canada. His grandfather, Arne Tuft, was an Olympic cross-country skier from Norway.

Tuft dropped out of school at 15 to travel and camp with his dog named Bear. He spent the next several years mountain climbing and going on long bike trips, including a 4,000 mile trip to Alaska as a teenager.

While racing with Symmetrics, Tuft lived in a trailer behind team owner Kevin Cunningham's house near Langley. In the adjacent trailer was Tuft's teammate Christian Meier. The team referred to the two as the trailer park boys.

Tuft retired in 2019 and started working on a memoir, which was published in 2025 and titled "We Will Never Be Here Again."

== Racing career ==
=== Symmetrics (2005–2008) ===
Tuft first raced in 1999, at the British Columbia Provincial Championships. Strong results landed him a place on the Broadmark Capital team, followed by short stints on the Mercury and Prime Alliance teams. Tuft's career flourished when he rode for the Canadian Symmetrics team – a prominent team in North American Cycling from 2005 to 2008. He first captured the Canadian national time trial title in 2004 from his former teammate and three-time Canadian Olympian Eric Wohlberg. Wohlberg held the title for eight consecutive years prior to Tuft. In 2007 Tuft conceded the Canadian National Time Trial title to Ryder Hesjedal.

He was selected to compete for Canada at the 2008 Summer Olympics in Beijing China in the Road Race and Time Trial. Svein Tuft was the best finisher for a long time in the time trial, before eventually finishing 7th.

His best result was second place in the 2008 UCI World Championships time trial in Varese Italy during which he overcame a flat tire in the last 5 km.

He featured prominently in a Symmetrics team Comic book written by Marvel Comics Dabel Brothers Productions Editor in chief Matthew Hansen, which is used as a press kit for the team. In the comic book, Tuft is very muscular. Upon seeing himself in the comic, Tuft remarked "We're all a bunch of sissies really."

=== SpiderTech–C10 (2011) ===
In 2011 Svein Tuft was supposed to be a part of Team Pegasus Cycling. Unfortunately due to sponsorship issues, the team had to pull out at the last minute. Tuft was recruited as a member of the Canadian Professional Pro-Continental Team, SpiderTech–C10, managed by Steve Bauer. Tuft won both the Canadian National Time Trial and Canadian National Road championships in Burlington, Ontario with SpiderTech in 2011. In August 2011, Tuft announced that he would leave SpiderTech for the Australian team GreenEDGE in 2012.

=== GreenEDGE (2012–2018) ===
==== 2012 season ====
He was praised for his 200-kilometre (120-mile) solo ride in front of the peloton during stage 2 of the 2012 Tirreno–Adriatico. During the race, he reportedly burnt 6500 calories. Mark Cavendish tweeted it as "Ride of the day.. No, make that ride of the millennium, goes to GreenEDGE's Svein Tuft. 200km ALONE controlling the peloton! Respect."

In August 2012, Tuft prevailed on stage 6 of the Eneco Tour, a 17.4 kilometres (10.8 mi) Individual Time Trial. The victory put him in the overall classification leader's jersey. He lost the lead the next day on the seventh and last stage of the Tour, where he had to face the steep climbs of the Belgian "bergs." Tuft was announced as the third overall rider, but he was handed a 20 seconds penalty for taking a bottle of water from his team's car with less than 20 km (12 mi) to cover, which is against the rules. That punishment relegated him to seventh place, one minute behind winner Lars Boom of Rabobank.

==== 2013 season ====
In 2013, Tuft opened his account and took the first victory of the season for Orica–GreenEDGE, by winning the individual time trial in the Tour de San Luis. The 19.2 km (11.9 mi) course was swept by strong winds, according to Tuft. In July, he was the lanterne rouge – final-placed rider overall – of the 100th Tour de France.

==== 2014 season ====
In 2014, Tuft wore the maglia rosa as leader of the Giro d'Italia since Orica–GreenEDGE won the opening team time trial and he crossed the line first. He stated afterward: "For a guy like me, to wear the maglia rosa is a once in a lifetime experience, and I'm really thankful to my team for that gift. It's a really special thing."

==== 2015 season ====
In 2015, Tuft crashed at the Tour de Romandie as he was carrying water bottles to give to his teammates. He was a non-starter for the third stage. It was later revealed after medical examination that he had suffered a minor wrist fracture and a sternum injury, and was therefore pulled out of Orica–GreenEDGE's Giro d'Italia's roster.

== Major results ==
2001
1st Stage 7 Tour de Beauce
2nd Time trial, National Road Championships
2002
3rd Time trial, National Road Championships
2003
2nd Time trial, National Road Championships
2004
National Road Championships

1st Time trial
2nd Road race

2005
1st Time trial, National Road Championships
2nd Overall Tour de Beauce
2006
National Road Championships

1st Time trial
2nd Road race

1st Prologue Vuelta a El Salvador
4th Time trial, Pan American Road Championships
7th Time trial, Commonwealth Games
10th Overall Vuelta a Chihuahua

1st Prologue

2007
1st 2006–07 UCI America Tour
1st Overall Vuelta a Cuba

1st Stage 11a (ITT)

1st U.S. Open Cycling Championships
1st Stage 1 Redlands Bicycle Classic
2nd Time trial, National Road Championships
2nd Overall Tour de Beauce
5th Lancaster Classic
7th Overall Vuelta a El Salvador
2008
Pan American Road and Track Championships

1st Time trial
1st Individual pursuit
1st Madison (with Zachary Bell)
1st Points race

1st Time trial, National Road Championships
1st Overall Tour de Beauce

1st Stage 4a (ITT)

2nd Time trial, UCI Road World Championships
3rd Overall Tour of Missouri
7th Time trial, Olympic Games
2009
1st Time trial, National Road Championships
4th Overall Herald Sun Tour
2010
1st Time trial, National Road Championships
2nd Overall Danmark Rundt

1st Stage 5 (ITT)

5th Overall Eneco Tour

1st Prologue

10th Overall Delta Tour Zeeland
2011
National Road Championships

1st Time trial
1st Road race

1st Grote Prijs Stad Zottegem
3rd Overall Tour de Beauce

1st Stages 4 (ITT) & 6

2012
1st Time trial, National Road Championships
1st Duo Normand (with Luke Durbridge)
1st Stage 1 (TTT) Tirreno–Adriatico
3rd Team time trial, UCI Road World Championships
4th Overall Three Days of De Panne
4th Overall Tour de Beauce

1st Stage 4 (ITT)

7th Overall Eneco Tour

1st Stages 2 (TTT) & 6 (ITT)

2013
1st Duo Normand (with Luke Durbridge)
1st Stage 4 (TTT) Tour de France
1st Stage 4 (ITT) Tour de San Luis
1st Stage 1 (ITT) Tour of Slovenia
2nd Team time trial, UCI Road World Championships
2014
National Road Championships

1st Time trial
1st Road race

Giro d'Italia

1st Stage 1 (TTT)
Held after Stage 1

2nd Team time trial, UCI Road World Championships
2nd Overall Tour du Poitou-Charentes
4th Time trial, Commonwealth Games
2016
1st Duo Normand (with Luke Durbridge)
3rd Team time trial, UCI Road World Championships
3rd Time trial, National Road Championships
2017
1st Time trial, National Road Championships
2018
1st Time trial, National Road Championships
10th Overall Tour de Beauce
2019
2nd Time trial, National Road Championships

=== Grand Tour general classification results timeline ===
Grand Tour	2009	2010	2011	2012	2013	2014	2015	2016	2017	2018
Giro d'Italia	—	125	—	148	153	155	—	146	142	147
Tour de France	—	—	—	—	169	131	159	—	—	—
Vuelta a España	DNF	—	—	—	—	—	—	158	DNF	—

Legend
DSQ	Disqualified
DNF	Did not finish
