= Taylor Phinney =

American road racing cyclist

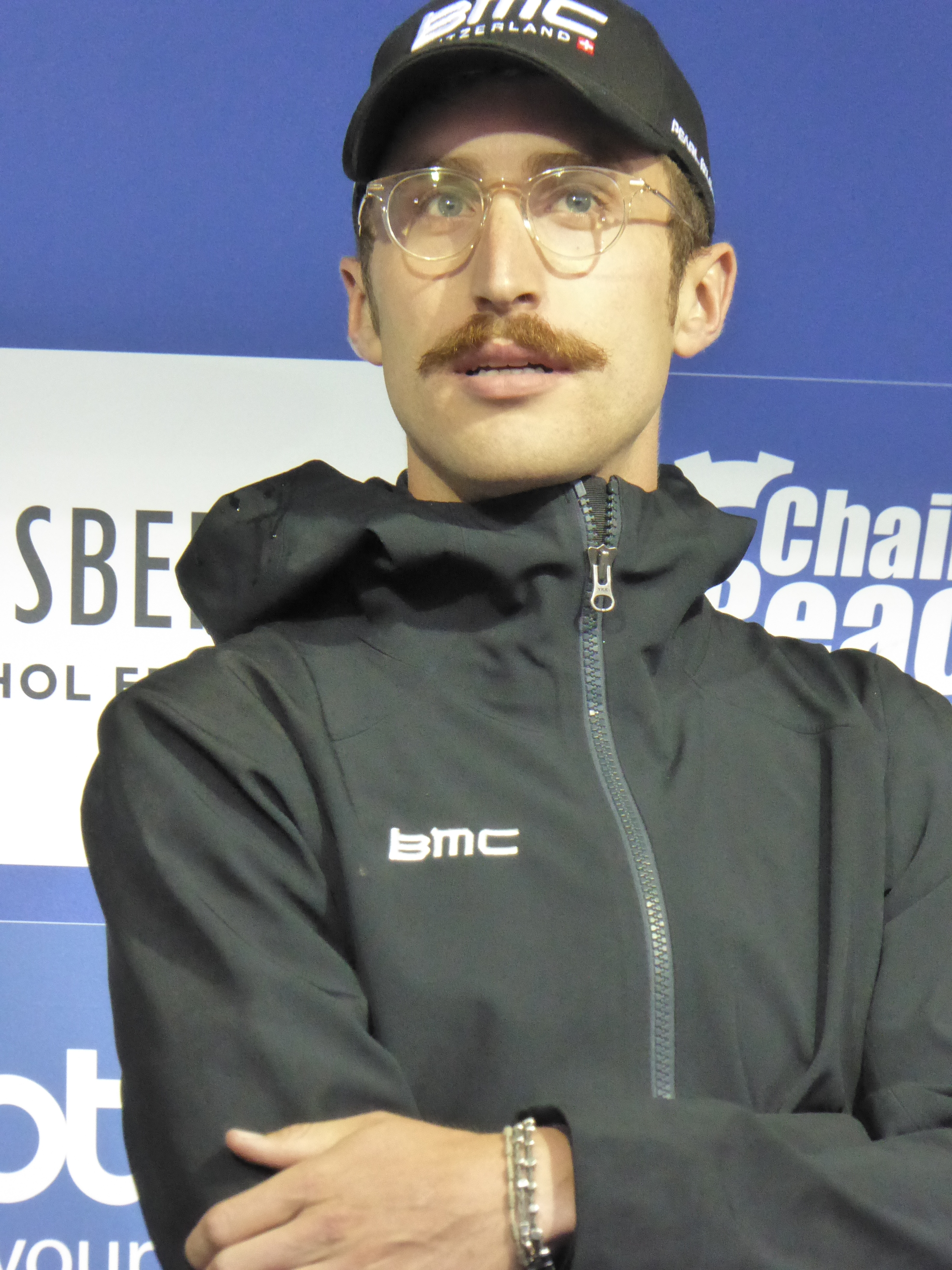
- Phinney at the 2016 Tour of Britain

Personal information
- Full name: Taylor Carpenter-Phinney
- Nickname: Mini Phinney
- Born: June 27, 1990 (age 36) Boulder, Colorado, United States
- Height: 1.97 m (6 ft 5 1/2 in)
- Weight: 85 kg (187 lb; 13 st 5 lb)

Cycling career
- Sport: Cycling
- Current team: Retired
- Disciplines: Road and track
- Role: Rider
- Rider type: Classics specialist Time trial specialist

Professional teams
- 2009–2010: Trek–Livestrong
- 2011–2016: BMC Racing Team
- 2017–2019: Cannondale–Drapac

Major wins
- Road Grand Tours Giro d'Italia 1 individual stage (2012) Stage races Dubai Tour (2014) One-day races and Classics National Time Trial Championships (2010, 2014, 2016) Track World Championships Individual pursuit (2009, 2010)
Medal record
Representing United States
Men's track cycling
World Championships
Gold medal – first place	2009 Pruszków	Individual pursuit
Gold medal – first place	2010 Ballerup	Individual pursuit
Silver medal – second place	2009 Pruszków	1 km time trial
Bronze medal – third place	2010 Ballerup	Omnium
Men's road bicycle racing
World Championships
Gold medal – first place	2010 Melbourne/Geelong	Under-23 time trial
Silver medal – second place	2012 Valkenburg	Time trial
Bronze medal – third place	2010 Melbourne/Geelong	Under-23 road race
Representing BMC Racing Team
Men's road bicycle racing
World Championships
Gold medal – first place	2015 Richmond	Team time trial
Silver medal – second place	2012 Valkenburg	Team time trial
Silver medal – second place	2016 Doha	Team time trial

Taylor Carpenter-Phinney (born June 27, 1990) is an American professional road racing cyclist, who rode professionally between 2009 and 2019 for the Trek–Livestrong, BMC Racing Team and EF Education First teams. He retired from cycling in 2019 but after years of retirement started racing on gravel and then was on the four-member team that won the team pursuit at the U.S. National Track Championships in August 2026. Phinney specialized in time trials on the road as well as the individual pursuit on the track, winning the world title in the discipline in 2009 and 2010.

== Early life and amateur career ==
Phinney was born on June 27, 1990, to former professional road cyclist and Olympic medal-winner Davis Phinney and former Olympic gold medal-winning cyclist and speed skater Connie Carpenter-Phinney.

In 2007 at the age of 16, Phinney began racing on Team Slipstream's junior squad. Slipstream team manager Jonathan Vaughters signed Phinney to the team before he had competed in a race, having heard word-of-mouth reports about Phinney's ability on group rides in Boulder. It was at this time that Phinney was introduced to track cycling. In August 2007, he won the World Junior Championships time trial title. Since then, Phinney has competed in National, World Cup and World Championship events for track cycling. Phinney finished seventh in the individual pursuit at the 2008 Summer Olympics. Later that year, at the U.S. National Track Championships, he won gold medals in the elite one kilometer time trial, individual pursuit and team pursuit races.

== Professional career ==
=== Trek–Livestrong (2009–2010) ===
On September 24, 2008, Lance Armstrong announced that Phinney had made the under-23 team, which was organized by the group that managed Armstrong's Team RadioShack, Trek–Livestrong. On March 26, 2009, Phinney won the individual pursuit at the 2009 UCI Track Cycling World Championships and, again, at the 2010 UCI Track Cycling World Championships on March 25, 2010. Phinney then switched his focus to the road, winning the Paris–Roubaix Espoirs, the Olympia's Tour overall, in addition to the first four stages and time trials in Tour de l'Avenir and Tour of Utah.

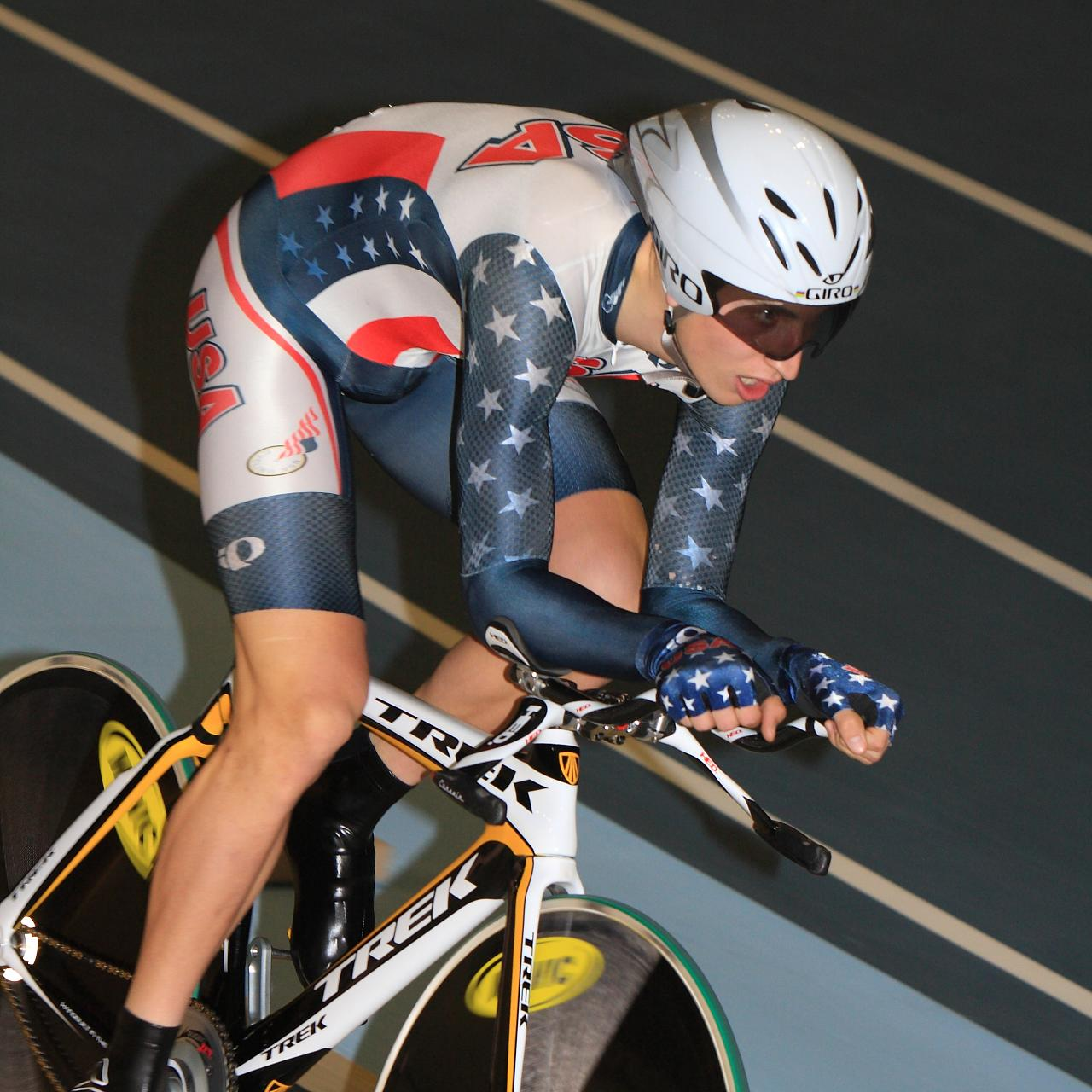
Phinney during the 2010 UCI Track World Championships, where he won a gold medal for the individual pursuit

On July 29, 2010, it was announced that Phinney and teammates Jesse Sergent and Clinton Avery would ride in the Tour of Denmark for Team RadioShack, riding as stagiaires.

=== BMC Racing (2011–2016) ===
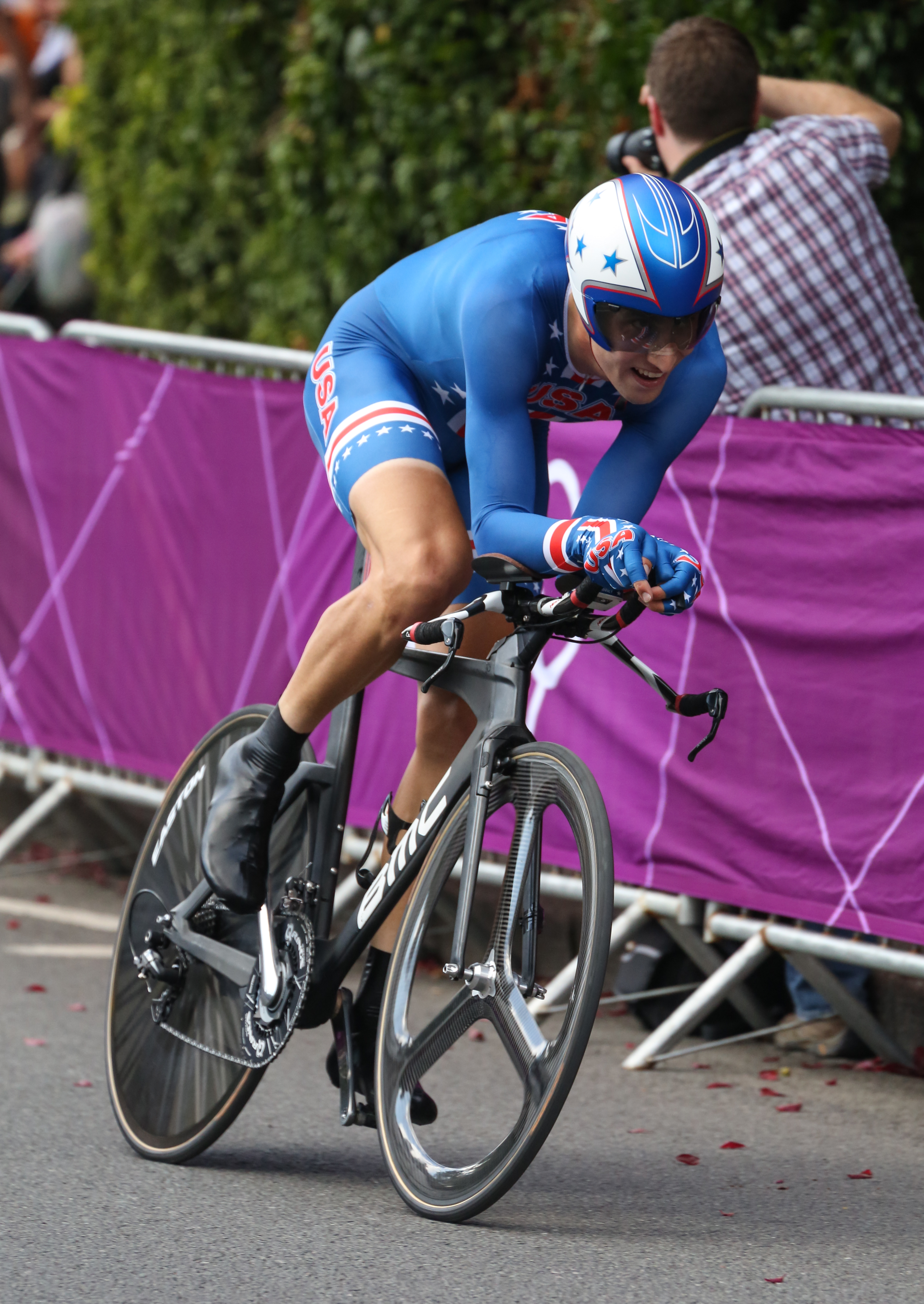
Phinney competing in the 2012 Olympics time trial in London

On September 22, 2010, the BMC Racing Team announced that Phinney would become part of BMC in 2011, joining a team that included Cadel Evans, George Hincapie and Alessandro Ballan. The highlight of Phinney's first season with BMC was a fourth-place finish in the Eneco Tour.

Phinney started the 2012 season by helping his team win the Giro del Trentino's team time trial, where he wore the leader's jersey for a day. His early target for the 2012 season was the opening stage of the Giro d'Italia, which he duly won to wear the leader's jersey, the maglia rosa, becoming just the third American to do so following Andrew Hampsten in 1988 and Christian Vande Velde in 2008. Phinney then switched his focus to the Olympic Games, targeting the road race and time trial, where he finished fourth in each event. He would go on to win the stage-seven individual time trial of the USA Pro Cycling Challenge. Phinney participated in the 2012 UCI World Road Race Championships. He was part of the six-man BMC team that took silver in the team time trial. Phinney also finished second to Tony Martin in the individual event, missing out on becoming World Champion by five seconds.

Amidst the turmoil of the Lance Armstrong–USADA affair, Phinney sent a tweet congratulating his teammate Steve Cummings for his stage win at the Tour of Beijing, saying "He [Cummings], like me, follows his own personal policy of no caffeine pills and no painkillers. Purest of the pure!" Phinney later explained his comment by stating that although legal, caffeine pills and mild painkillers were often used in the peloton during races, and that some riders even crushed them and mixed them in water bottles. He stated that he was entirely against that practice and doping in general.

On the penultimate stage of the 2013 Tirreno–Adriatico, in heavy rain, Phinney found himself well in arrears of the leaders on a tough finishing circuit, which included a climb at Sant'Elpidio a Mare with gradients reaching 27 percent. Around 30 other riders in the group abandoned the race with over 100 kilometers (62 miles) to go, but Phinney rode on alone in the hope of making the time limit, so he could compete in the final day's time trial. Ultimately, Phinney missed the time limit by over ten minutes.

In the early part of the 2014 season, Phinney won the inaugural Dubai Tour after winning the opening time-trial. In May, Phinney won a stage of the Tour of California. With more than 23 kilometers to the finish, Phinney broke away from a reduced peloton and won by 12 seconds. Soon after, Phinney was victorious for a second time at the United States National Time Trial Championships. Two days later, at the United States National Road Race Championships, Phinney suffered a career-threatening crash after sliding into a guard-rail. He was attempting to avoid a motorcycle on the descent of Lookout Mountain in Tennessee. His injuries—a compound fracture to his tibia and severed patellar tendon—required surgery. Phinney never wore his national jersey as he remained out of action for a year, having initially been given a six-to-eight-week recovery period.

At the end of 2015, Phinney participated in "Thereabouts 2", with Angus Morton, Lachlan Morton and Cameron Wurf. "Thereabouts 2" was an adventure-related cycling trip from Boulder, Colorado to Moab, Utah, while attempting to realize what makes cycling so special: adventure, friendship and a lack of structure.

Phinney spent the early part of the 2016 season recovering from his injuries, making his first race appearance of the year at the Tour du Haut Var in February and subsequently racing in the spring classics before returning from Europe to his native Colorado. In May 2016 Phinney took his third national time trial title in Winston-Salem, North Carolina, beating runner-up Tom Zirbel by over a minute: Phinney expressed satisfaction with the result and his performance, hoping that it would help him secure selection for the 2016 Summer Olympics. He competed at the Olympics, but despite entering the road time trial with hopes of a medal, he finished 22nd, over five minutes behind winner Fabian Cancellara.

=== Cannondale–Drapac Pro Cycling Team (2017–2019) ===
Phinney during the Amgen Tour of California in 2019

In September 2016 Phinney confirmed that he had agreed an initial two-year deal with Cannondale–Drapac from the 2017 season, with a focus on competing in the classics and aiming to race in the 2017 Tour de France. In June 2017, he was named in the start list for the 2017 Tour de France, marking his debut in the race. In an interview ahead of the Tour Phinney stated that he was still undergoing therapy to deal with the effects of his injuries, and said that the power output from his left side was almost 25 percent down on that from his right side when making an explosive effort. Phinney was leading the mountains classification and wearing the polka dot jersey competition on stage 2.

=== Retirement ===
In October 2019 Phinney announced that he would retire from professional racing at the end of the 2019 season. He cited the ongoing effects of an injury he suffered in 2014 as a reason for his retirement.

=== Return to the track ===
In April 2026, Phinney announced that he was returning to track cycling, aiming to represent the United States at the 2028 Summer Olympics in Los Angeles.

== Personal life ==
Since 2016, Phinney has been in a relationship with Polish professional cyclist Katarzyna Niewiadoma. The pair married in May 2024. Phinney's father is American retired cyclist Davis Phinney, who won two Tour de France stages in the 1980s. Phinney's mother is American retired racing cyclist and speed skater Connie Carpenter-Phinney who won four medals in World Cycling Championship competitions (both road and track cycling) in the late 1970s and early 1980s. She also won the gold medal in the cycling road race at the 1984 Summer Olympics in Los Angeles, as well as twelve U.S. national championships. She remains the youngest American woman to compete at the Winter Olympics.

== Major results ==
=== Road ===
2007
1st Time trial, UCI World Junior Championships
Tour de l'Abitibi

1st Stages 1 (ITT) & 2

2009
1st Paris–Roubaix Espoirs
1st Stage 1 Flèche du Sud
2010 (3 pro wins)
1st Time trial, UCI World Under-23 Championships
1st Time trial, National Championships
1st Overall Olympia's Tour

1st Prologue, Stages 1, 2 & 3

Tour of Utah

1st Prologue & Stage 3 (ITT)

1st Paris–Roubaix Espoirs
1st Stage 2b Le Triptyque des Monts et Châteaux
1st Stage 4 Tour of the Gila
1st Prologue Tour de l'Avenir
2011 (1)
4th Overall Eneco Tour

1st Prologue

2012 (2)
Giro d'Italia

1st Stage 1 (ITT)
Held after Stages 1–3

1st Stage 7 (ITT) USA Pro Cycling Challenge
1st Stage 1 (TTT) Giro del Trentino
UCI World Championships

2nd Team time trial
2nd Time trial

3rd Chrono des Nations
Olympic Games

4th Road race
4th Time trial

2013 (1)
1st Stage 4 Tour de Pologne
3rd Overall Tour of Qatar

1st Young rider classification
1st Stage 2 (TTT)

3rd Giro di Toscana
5th Time trial, UCI World Championships
7th Milan–San Remo
2014 (4)
1st Time trial, National Championships
1st Overall Dubai Tour

1st Young rider classification
1st Stage 1 (ITT)

1st Stage 5 Tour of California
7th Omloop Het Nieuwsblad
2015 (1)
1st Team time trial, UCI World Championships
1st Stage 1 USA Pro Cycling Challenge
2016 (1)
1st Time trial, National Championships
1st Stage 1 (TTT) Tirreno–Adriatico
1st Stage 5 (TTT) Eneco Tour
2nd Team time trial, UCI World Championships
2017
Tour de France

Held after Stage 2

2018
8th Paris–Roubaix
2019
1st Stage 1 (TTT) Tour Colombia

==== Grand Tour general classification results timeline ====
Grand Tour	2011	2012	2013	2014	2015	2016	2017	2018
Giro d'Italia	—	155	DNF	—	—	—	—	—
Tour de France	—	—	—	—	—	—	159	136
Vuelta a España	DNF	—	—	—	—	—	—	—

Legend
—	Did not compete
DNF	Did not finish
IP	In Progress

=== Track ===
2007
1st Individual pursuit, National Championships
2008
1st Individual pursuit, UCI World Junior Championships
National Junior Championships

1st Individual pursuit
1st Kilo
1st Team pursuit

2009
UCI World Championships

1st Individual pursuit
2nd Kilo

National Championships

1st Individual pursuit
1st Points race
1st Team pursuit

UCI World Cup Classics

1st Individual pursuit
1st Kilo

2010
UCI World Championships

1st Individual pursuit
3rd Omnium

2026
1st Team pursuit, National Championships

Sporting positions
Preceded by David Zabriskie	United States National Time Trial champion 2010	Succeeded by David Zabriskie
Preceded by Tom Zirbel	United States National Time Trial champion 2014	Succeeded by Andrew Talansky
Preceded by Andrew Talansky	United States National Time Trial champion 2016	Succeeded by Joey Rosskopf
