= Tour de Georgia =

Road cycling race in Georgia, United States

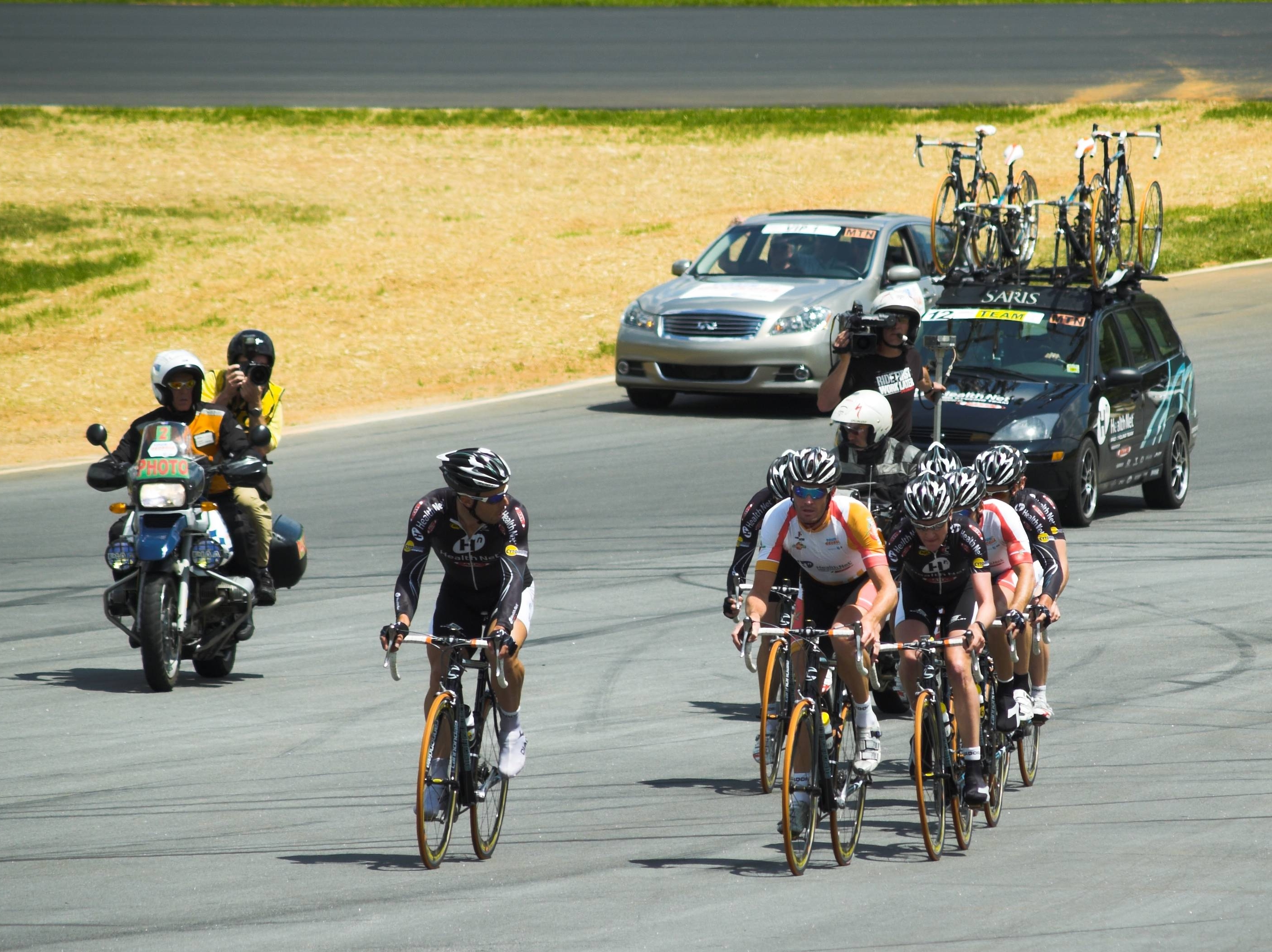
- 2008 Team Time Trials

Race details
- Date: April
- Region: Northern Georgia and Chattanooga, Tennessee
- Discipline: Road
- Competition: UCI America Tour 2.HC
- Type: Stage race
- Organiser: Chris Aronhalt and Jim Birrell
- Web site: www.tourdegeorgia.com

History
- First edition: 2003
- Editions: 6 (as of 2008)
- First winner: Chris Horner (USA)
- Most recent: Kanstantsin Sivtsov (BLR)

The Tour de Georgia was a U.S. professional road cycling stage race across the state of Georgia. The race began in 2003 and was contested six times until 2008. It was one of the three events in North America ranked as Hors Classe (2.HC) stage race events by the UCI, which is cycling's international governing body, along with the Tour of Missouri and the Tour of California. The event was cancelled in 2009 and 2010, and despite its backers aiming for the race to be held again in 2011, it has not been held since.

== History ==
Conceived by then-commissioner R.K. Sehgal in 2002, the race was developed by the Georgia Department of Industry, Trade and Tourism (now known as the Georgia Department of Economic Development) for the benefit of the Georgia Cancer Coalition. Beginning with the 2008 race, The Aflac Cancer Center and Blood Disorders Service of Children's Healthcare of Atlanta will be the race's official beneficiary organization. The Tour de Georgia boosted tourism in Georgia providing 2.3 million visitors and a $26 million economic impact between 2003 and 2006.

The race quickly generated international attention when the U.S. Postal Service cycling team began using it as part of Lance Armstrong's preparation for the Tour de France. Armstrong rode in the race before his Tour campaigns in 2004 and 2005, and Floyd Landis won it before his Tour victory (later disallowed along with all of Armstrong's wins) in 2006.

On 14 November 2008, the directors of the Tour de Georgia announced that the 2009 race would be canceled, but that the race planned to return in 2010. The reason given was a lack of sponsorship, which had caused the Tour to seek some reductions in 2008 bills. The 2010 event was also cancelled for financial reasons, although the race's backers were aiming for the race to return in 2011. As of July 2012, the race has not been revived.

== Route ==
This six stage event extends riders over 600 miles in six days. One ends in a steep ascent to the top of Brasstown Bald, the highest point in Georgia. As in the Tour de France, the overall leader wears a yellow jersey.

== History of results ==
=== General Classification ===
The current leader and overall winner by time after each stage and at the conclusion of the race is awarded the Yellow Jersey.

- 2003 : (United States) Chris Horner, Saturn
- 2004 : (United States) Lance Armstrong, U.S. Postal Service Pro Cycling Team
- 2005 : (United States) Tom Danielson, Discovery Channel Pro Cycling Team
- 2006 : (United States) Floyd Landis, Phonak Hearing Systems
- 2007 : (Slovenia) Janez Brajkovič, Discovery Channel Pro Cycling Team
- 2008 : (Belarus) Kanstantsin Sivtsov, Team High Road

=== Sprints Classification ===
The Sprint Leader Jersey is a gray and Aqua-blue Jersey is worn by the rider that receives the most bonus points awarded through his placing in intermediate sprints and finishing in the top 15 places at the end of the stage.

- 2003 : (United States) Freddy Rodríguez, Vini Caldirola–So.di
- 2004 : (Canada) Gord Fraser, Health Net Pro Cycling Team Presented by Maxxis
- 2005 : (New Zealand) Greg Henderson
- 2006 : (United States) Fred Rodriguez (2), Davitamon–Lotto
- 2007 : (Argentina) Juan José Haedo, Team CSC
- 2008 : (New Zealand) Greg Henderson (2), Team High Road

=== Mountains Classification ===
The King of the Mountains Jersey is worn by current leader and overall winner by points awarded by his placing in mountain climbs. The leader wears a Georgia-inspired Peaches Theme Jersey (in substitution of the traditional polka dot theme of the Tour de France jersey).

- 2003 : (United States) Chris Horner, Saturn
- 2004 : (United States) Jason McCartney, Health Net Pro Cycling Team Presented by Maxxis
- 2005 : (Spain) José Luis Rubiera, Discovery Channel Pro Cycling Team
- 2006 : (United States) Jason McCartney (2), Discovery Channel Pro Cycling Team
- 2007 : (Canada) Ryder Hesjedal, Health Net Pro Cycling Team Presented by Maxxis
- 2008 : (United States) Jason McCartney (3), Team CSC

=== Best Young Rider Classification ===
The Best Young Rider is the best racer in General Classification that has less than 25 years old. He wears a Green Jersey.

- 2003 : (United States) Saul Raisin
- 2004 : (United States) Kevin Bouchard-Hall
- 2005 : (Australia) Trent Lowe, Jittery Joe's
- 2006 : (Slovenia) Janez Brajkovič, Discovery Channel Pro Cycling Team
- 2007 : (Slovenia) Janez Brajkovič, Discovery Channel Pro Cycling Team
- 2008 : (Australia) Trent Lowe (2), Slipstream–Chipotle

=== Most Aggressive Rider Classification ===
The Most Aggressive Rider wears the Blue and Green Jersey. The jersey is awarded at the end of each stage to the rider that demonstrates the most aggressive attacks, breakaways or strategies, as judged by a panel of media and race entourage officials (since 2005).

- 2005 : (Italy) Andrea Tafi, Saunier Duval–Prodir
- 2006 : (United States) Will Frischkorn, Team TIAA–CREF
- 2007 : (Colombia) César Grajales, Jittery Joe's
- 2008 : (Australia) Rory Sutherland, Health Net Pro Cycling Team
