= 2008 Tour de Georgia =

2007–08 UCI America Tour

Race details
- Dates: April 21 – April 27
- Stages: 7
- Distance: 600 mi (965.6 km)
- Winning time: 22h 44' 44"

Results
	Winner	Kanstantsin Sivtsov (BLR)	(Team High Road)
	Second	Trent Lowe (AUS)	(Slipstream–Chipotle)
	Third	Levi Leipheimer (USA)	(Astana Team)
	Mountains	Jason McCartney (USA)	(Team CSC)
	Youth	Trent Lowe (AUS)	(Slipstream–Chipotle)
	Sprints	Greg Henderson (NZL)	(Team High Road)
	Team	(Luxembourg) Astana Team	

The 2008 Tour de Georgia was a seven-stage professional bicycle race held from April 21 through April 27, 2008 across the state of Georgia. The race was part of the 2008 USA Cycling Pro Tour and 2007–08 UCI America Tour, and was presented by AT&T.

== Stage Results ==
=== Stage 1, April 21, Tybee Island – Savannah, 115.6 km ===
The first stage of the Tour was a short and flat stage suited for sprinters, starting in Tybee Island and finishing in Savannah. A group of six riders broke clear of the main field and established a lead of over one minute, before being caught in the final 10 miles (16 km). The stage was won in a bunch sprint by Iván Domínguez of Toyota–United, ahead of Nicholas Sanderson (Jelly Belly) and Robert Förster (Gerolsteiner). Dominguez's win meant that he assumed the lead in the overall classification.

Stage 1 Results

	Cyclist	Team	Time
1	Iván Domínguez (CUB)	Toyota–United Pro Cycling Team	2h 30' 18"
2	Nicholas Sanderson (AUS)	Jelly Belly Cycling Team	s.t.
3	Robert Förster (GER)	Team Gerolsteiner	s.t.

General Classification after Stage 1

	Cyclist	Team	Time
1	Iván Domínguez (CUB)	Toyota–United Pro Cycling Team	2h 30' 08"
2	Nicholas Sanderson (AUS)	Jelly Belly Cycling Team	+ 4"
3	Greg Henderson (NZL)	Team High Road	+ 5"

=== Stage 2, April 22, Statesboro – Augusta, 186.2 km ===
Stage 2 Results

	Cyclist	Team	Time
1	Juan José Haedo (ARG)	Team CSC	4h 32' 35"
2	Greg Henderson (NZL)	Team High Road	s.t.
3	Iván Domínguez (CUB)	Toyota–United Pro Cycling Team	s.t.

General Classification after Stage 2

	Cyclist	Team	Time
1	Iván Domínguez (CUB)	Toyota–United Pro Cycling Team	7h 02' 39"
2	Greg Henderson (NZL)	Team High Road	+ 3"
3	Juan José Haedo (ARG)	Team CSC	+ 4"

=== Stage 3, April 23, Washington – Gainesville, 176.5 km ===
Stage 3 Results

	Cyclist	Team	Time
1	Greg Henderson (NZL)	Team High Road	3h 55' 45"
2	André Greipel (GER)	Team High Road	s.t.
3	Tyler Farrar (USA)	Slipstream–Chipotle	s.t.

General Classification after Stage 3

	Cyclist	Team	Time
1	Greg Henderson (NZL)	Team High Road	10h 58' 17"
2	Tyler Farrar (USA)	Slipstream–Chipotle	+ 9"
3	Juan José Haedo (ARG)	Team CSC	+ 11"

=== Stage 4, April 24, Braselton (Road Atlanta), 16.1 km (Team Time Trial) ===
Stage 4 Results

	Team	Time
1	Slipstream–Chipotle (USA)	19' 36"
2	Astana Team (LUX)	+ 4"
3	Team High Road (USA)	+ 6"

General Classification after Stage 4

	Cyclist	Team	Time
1	Greg Henderson (NZL)	Team High Road	11h 17' 59"
2	André Greipel (GER)	Team High Road	+ 15"
3	David Zabriskie (USA)	Slipstream–Chipotle	+ 15"

=== Stage 5, April 25, Suwanee – Dahlonega, 214.7 km ===
Stage 5 Results

	Cyclist	Team	Time
1	Richard England (AUS)	Bissell Pro Cycling Team	5h 15' 15"
2	Rory Sutherland (AUS)	Health Net Pro Cycling Team	s.t.
3	George Hincapie (USA)	Team High Road	s.t.

General Classification after Stage 5

	Cyclist	Team	Time
1	Trent Lowe (AUS)	Slipstream–Chipotle	16h 33' 29"
2	David Zabriskie (USA)	Slipstream–Chipotle	s.t.
3	Christian Vande Velde (USA)	Slipstream–Chipotle	s.t.

=== Stage 6, April 26, Blairsville – Brasstown Bald, 142.3 km ===
Stage 6 Results

	Cyclist	Team	Time
1	Kanstantsin Sivtsov (BLR)	Team High Road	3h 47' 16"
2	Trent Lowe (AUS)	Slipstream–Chipotle	+ 10"
3	Levi Leipheimer (USA)	Astana Team	+ 16"

General Classification after Stage 6

	Cyclist	Team	Time
1	Kanstantsin Sivtsov (BLR)	Team High Road	20h 20' 51"
2	Trent Lowe (AUS)	Slipstream–Chipotle	+ 4"
3	Levi Leipheimer (USA)	Astana Team	+ 14"

=== Stage 7, April 27, Atlanta, 100.9 km ===
Stage 7 Results

	Cyclist	Team	Time
1	Greg Henderson (NZL)	Team High Road	2h 23' 53"
2	Juan José Haedo (ARG)	Team CSC	s.t.
3	Andrew Pinfold (CAN)	Symmetrics Cycling Team	s.t.

General Classification after Stage 7

	Cyclist	Team	Time
1	Kanstantsin Sivtsov (BLR)	Team High Road	22h 44' 44"
2	Trent Lowe (AUS)	Slipstream–Chipotle	+ 4"
3	Levi Leipheimer (USA)	Astana Team	+ 14"

== Final standing ==
=== General classification ===
	Cyclist	Team	Time
1	Kanstantsin Sivtsov (BLR)	Team High Road	22h 44' 44"
2	Trent Lowe (AUS)	Slipstream–Chipotle	+ 4"
3	Levi Leipheimer (USA)	Astana Team	+ 14"
4	Antonio Colom (ESP)	Astana Team	+ 1' 02"
5	Íñigo Cuesta (ESP)	Team CSC	+ 1' 11"
6	Óscar Sevilla (ESP)	Rock Racing	+ 1' 25"
7	Christian Vande Velde (USA)	Slipstream–Chipotle	+ 1' 32"
8	Moisés Aldape (MEX)	Team Type 1	+ 1' 37"
9	Rory Sutherland (AUS)	Health Net Pro Cycling Team	+ 2' 08"
10	Bobby Julich (USA)	Team CSC	+ 2' 31"

=== Young classification ===
	Cyclist	Team	Time
1	Trent Lowe (AUS)	Slipstream–Chipotle	22h 44' 48"
2	Christian Meier (CAN)	Symmetrics Cycling Team	+ 3' 40"
3	Cameron Evans (CAN)	Symmetrics Cycling Team	+ 8' 06"

=== Mountains classification ===
	Cyclist	Team	Points
1	Jason McCartney (USA)	Team CSC	18
2	Neil Shirley (USA)	Jittery Joe's Cycling Team	16
3	Svein Tuft (CAN)	Symmetrics Cycling Team	13

=== Sprint classification ===
	Cyclist	Team	Points
1	Greg Henderson (NZL)	Team High Road	53
2	Tyler Farrar (USA)	Slipstream–Chipotle	35
3	Andrew Pinfold (CAN)	Symmetrics Cycling Team	28

=== Team classification ===
	Team	Country	Time
1	Astana Team	Luxembourg	68h 17' 50"
2	Team CSC	Denmark	+ 3' 30"
3	Jittery Joe's Cycling Team	United States	+ 4' 56"

== Jersey progress ==
Stage (Winner)	General Classification	Young Classification	Mountains Classification	Sprint Classification	Aggressive Rider	Team Classification
Stage 1 (Iván Domínguez)	Iván Domínguez	Nicholas Sanderson		Iván Domínguez	Scott Nydam	Toyota–United
Stage 2 (Juan José Haedo)	Iván Domínguez	Nicholas Sanderson	Frank Pipp	Iván Domínguez	Rhys Pollack	Toyota–United
Stage 3 (Greg Henderson)	Greg Henderson	Tyler Farrar	Frank Pipp	Greg Henderson	Rory Sutherland	Team High Road
Stage 4 (Slipstream)	Greg Henderson	Trent Lowe	Frank Pipp	Greg Henderson	Rory Sutherland	Slipstream–Chipotle
Stage 5 (Richard England)	Trent Lowe	Trent Lowe	Edward King	Greg Henderson	Tim Johnson	Slipstream–Chipotle
Stage 6 (Kanstantsin Sivtsov)	Kanstantsin Sivtsov	Trent Lowe	Jason McCartney	Greg Henderson	Neil Shirley	Astana Team
Stage 7 (Greg Henderson)	Kanstantsin Sivtsov	Trent Lowe	Jason McCartney	Greg Henderson	Rory Sutherland	Astana Team
Final	Kanstantsin Sivtsov	Trent Lowe	Jason McCartney	Greg Henderson	Rory Sutherland	Astana Team

== Participating teams ==
UCI ProTour Teams

- AST – (Luxembourg) Astana Team
- CSC – (Denmark) Team CSC
- GST – (Germany) Gerolsteiner
- THR – (United States) Team High Road

UCI Professional Continental Teams

- BMC – (United States) BMC Racing Team
- TSL – (United States) Slipstream–Chipotle presented by H30

UCI Continental Teams—America Tour

- BPC – (United States) Bissell Pro Cycling Team
- HNM – (United States) Health Net Pro Cycling Team Presented by Maxxis
- TUP – (United States) Toyota–United Pro Cycling Team
- JBC – (United States) Jelly Belly Cycling Team
- JIT – (United States) Jittery Joe's Professional Cycling Team
- SYM – (Canada) Symmetrics Cycling Team
- TT1 – (United States) Team Type 1
- RRC – (United States) Rock Racing

UCI Continental Team—Asia Tour

- MPC – (China) GE/Marco Polo Cycling Team presented by Trek
