= 2005 Tour de Georgia =

Race details
- Dates: April 19–24
- Stages: 6
- Distance: 1,033.4 km (642.1 mi)
- Winning time: 26h 53' 54"

Results
	Winner	Floyd Landis (USA)	(Phonak)
	Second	Bobby Julich (USA)	(Team CSC)
	Third	Marco Pinotti (ITA)	(Saunier Duval–Prodir)
	Points	Greg Henderson (NZL)	(Health Net)
	Mountains	José Luis Rubiera (ESP)	(Discovery Channel)
	Young rider	Trent Lowe (AUS)	(Jittery Joe's–Kalahari)
	Team	Discovery Channel	

The 2005 Tour de Georgia was the third annual bicycle road racing event held in the state of Georgia, United States. The six-day, six stage 550 mile (1033.4 km) race was held April 19 through April 24, 2005 with the overall title and yellow jersey won by Tom Danielson of the Discovery Channel. However, Danielson in 2012, was disqualified due to doping, along with a number of other riders. This left the first non-disqualified rider as Floyd Landis.

New Zealander Greg Henderson (Health Net Pro Cycling Team Presented by Maxxis) claimed the points jersey for sprinters, while Discovery Channel's José Luis Rubiera won the King of the Mountains competition for climbers. Trent Lowe (Jittery Joe's–Kalahari) won the Best Young Rider (blue jersey) competition.

== Final results ==
=== General Classification ===
	Cyclist	Country	Team	Time
-	~~Tom Danielson~~	~~United States~~	~~Discovery Channel~~	~~"26h 53'44"~~
-	~~Levi Leipheimer~~	~~United States~~	~~Team Gerolsteiner~~	~~+ 0'04"~~
1	Floyd Landis	United States	Phonak Hearing Systems	26h 53'53
2	Bobby Julich	United States	Team CSC	+ 1'10"
-	~~Lance Armstrong~~	~~United States~~	~~Discovery Channel Pro Cycling Team~~	~~+ 1'41"~~
-	~~David Zabriskie~~	~~United States~~	~~Team CSC~~	~~+ 3'04"~~
3	Marco Pinotti	Italy	Saunier Duval–Prodir	+ 3'11"
4	Nathan O'Neill	Australia	Navigators Insurance	+ 3'14"
5	Michael Blaudzun	Denmark	Team CSC	+ 3'51"
6	José Azevedo	Portugal	Discovery Channel Pro Cycling Team	+ 5'25"

=== Points Classification ===
	Cyclist	Country	Team
1	Greg Henderson	New Zealand	Health Net Pro Cycling Team Presented by Maxxis

=== King of The Mountains Classification ===
	Cyclist	Country	Team
1	José Luis Rubiera	Spain	Discovery Channel Pro Cycling Team

=== Most Aggressive Rider Classification ===
The Most Aggressive Rider wears the blue and green jersey. The jersey is awarded at the end of each stage to the rider that demonstrates the most aggressive attacks, breakaways or strategies, as judged by a panel of media and race entourage officials.

	Cyclist	Country	Team
1	Andrea Tafi	Italy	Saunier Duval–Prodir

=== Best Young Rider Classification ===
The Best Young Rider wears the green jersey. The jersey is awarded daily in the same manner as the general classification, which is by the overall placement at the finish line after each stage, with the least amount of overall accumulated time.

	Cyclist	Country	Team
1	Trent Lowe	Australia	Jittery Joe's

=== Team competition ===
- (United States) Discovery Channel

(and in no particular order)

UCI ProTour Teams

- (Denmark) Team CSC
- (Switzerland) Phonak Hearing Systems
- (Spain) Saunier Duval–Prodir
- (France) Crédit Agricole
- (Germany) Team Gerolsteiner

UCI Professional Continental Teams

- (United States) Health Net Pro Cycling Team Presented by Maxxis
- (United States) Navigators Insurance Cycling Team
- (Italy) Team L.P.R.
- (United States) Colavita Olive Oil-Sutter Homes Wines Cycling Team
- (United States) Kodakgallery.com–Sierra Nevada Pro Cycling Team
- (United States) Jittery Joe's–Kalahari Cycling Team
- (United States) Jelly Belly–Pool Gel
- (United States) Team TIAA–CREF
- USA National Cycling Team
- (Canada) Symmetrics
