= 2004 Tour de Georgia =

Race details
- Dates: April 20 – April 25
- Stages: 7
- Distance: 1,050 km (650 mi)
- Winning time: 25h 39' 20"

Results
	Winner	None	(None)
	Second	Jens Voigt (GER)	(Team CSC)
	Third	Chris Horner (USA)	(Webcor Builders)
	Points	Gord Fraser (CAN)	(Health Net)
	Mountains	Jason McCartney (USA)	(Health Net)
	Young rider	Kevin Bouchard-Hall (USA)	(USA National Team)
	Team	(Denmark) Team CSC	

The 2004 Tour de Georgia was the second annual bicycle road racing event held in the state of Georgia, United States. The six-day, seven stage 1050 km race was held April 20 through April 25, 2004 with no winner declared for the overall title and yellow jersey, following the disqualification of the first-placed rider for using illegal drugs and practices to win. Canadian Gord Fraser (Health Net Pro Cycling Team Presented by Maxxis) claimed the points jersey for sprinters, while teammate Jason McCartney won the King of the Mountains competition for climbers. Kevin Bouchard-Hall (TIAA-CREF) won the Best Young Rider (blue jersey) competition.

== Stages ==
Stage 1
132.2 km Stage Race, Macon to Macon
Winner: Gord Fraser, Canada, Health Net Pro Cycling Team Presented by Maxxis

General classification after stage 1

1 Gord Fraser (Can) Health Net Presented by Maxxis                   3.18.48
2 Ivan Dominguez (Cub) Colavita Olive Oil, presented by Bolla Wines     0.05
3 Jens Voigt (Ger) Team CSC                                             0.07

Stage 2
189.9 km Stage Race, Thomaston to Columbus
Winner: Mario Cipollini, Italy, Domina Vacanze

General classification after stage 2

1 Gord Fraser (Can) Health Net Presented by Maxxis                   7.59.28
2 Ivan Dominguez (Cub) Colavita Olive Oil, presented by Bolla Wines     0.03
3 Mario Cipollini (Ita) Domina Vacanze                                  0.05

Stage 3
126.2 km Stage Race, Carrollton to Rome
Winner: ~~Lance Armstrong, United States, U.S. Postal Service Pro Cycling Team presented by Berry Floor~~

General classification after stage 3

1 Ivan Dominguez (Cub) Colavita Olive Oil, presented by Bolla Wines    10.41.09
2 Gord Fraser (Can) Health Net Presented by Maxxis                         0.01
3 Mario Cipollini (Ita) Domina Vacanze                                     0.06

Stage 4
29.9 km Time Trial, Rome to Rome
Winner: ~~Lance Armstrong, United States, U.S. Postal Service Pro Cycling Team presented by Berry Floor~~

General classification after stage 4

DQ Lance Armstrong (USA) US Postal Service presented by Berry Floor      11.21.10
2 Jens Voigt (Ger) Team CSC                                                 0.24
3 Chris Horner (USA) Webcor Builders                                        0.51

Stage 5
224.3 km Stage Race, Dalton to Dahlonega
Winner: Jason McCartney, United States, Health Net Pro Cycling Team Presented by Maxxis

General classification after stage 5

DQ Lance Armstrong (USA) US Postal Service presented by Berry Floor      17.02.19
2 Jens Voigt (Ger) Team CSC                                                 0.24
3 Chris Horner (USA) Webcor Builders                                        0.51

Stage 6
224.3 km Stage Race, Athens to Hiawassee/Young Harris
Winner: César Grajales, Colombia, Jittery Joe's

General classification after stage 6

DQ Lance Armstrong (USA) US Postal Service/Berry Floor                   22.19.05
2 Jens Voigt (Ger) Team CSC                                                 0.24
3 Chris Horner (USA) Webcor Builders                                        1.01

Stage 7
142.3 km Stage Race, Dawsonville to Alpharetta
Winner: Gord Fraser, Canada, Health Net Pro Cycling Team Presented by Maxxis

== Final results ==
=== General Classification ===
	Cyclist	Team	Time
DQ	~~Lance Armstrong (USA)~~	~~U.S. Postal Service Pro Cycling Team presented by Berry Floor~~	25h 39'20"
2	Jens Voigt (GER)	Team CSC	+ 0'24"
3	Chris Horner (USA)	Webcor Builders	+ 1'01"
4	Bobby Julich (USA)	Team CSC	+ 1'57"
5	Viatcheslav Ekimov (RUS)	U.S. Postal Service presented by Berry Floor	+ 2'59"
6	César Grajales (COL)	Jittery Joe's Coffee	+ 3'07"
7	Scott Moninger (USA)	Health Net Presented by Maxxis	+ 3'44"
8	Sergio Marinangeli (ITA)	Domina Vacanze	+ 4'06"
9	Brian Vandborg (DEN)	Team CSC	+ 4'52"
10	Eric Wohlberg (CAN)	Sierra Nevada Cycling	+ 5'25"

=== Points Classification ===
	Cyclist	Team
1	Gord Fraser (CAN)	Health Net Pro Cycling Team Presented by Maxxis

=== King of The Mountains Classification ===
	Cyclist	Team
1	Jason McCartney (USA)	Health Net Pro Cycling Team Presented by Maxxis

=== Best Young Rider ===
	Cyclist	Team
1	Kevin Bouchard-Hall (USA)	USA National Cycling Team

=== Team competition ===
- (Denmark) Team CSC

followed in no particular order

- (United States) U.S. Postal Service Pro Cycling Team presented by Berry Floor
- (United States) Health Net Pro Cycling Team Presented by Maxxis
- (Italy) Domina Vacanze
- (Italy) Barloworld–Androni Giocattoli
- (Italy) Landbouwkrediet–Colnago
- (Italy) Saeco–Saunier Duval
- (United States) Colavita Olive Oil presented by Bolla Wines
- (United States) Jelly Belly/Aramark
- (United States) Jittery Joe's Coffee
- (United States) Navigators Insurance Cycling Team
- (United States) Ofoto/Lombardi Sports
- (United States) Sierra Nevada Cycling
- (United States) USA National Cycling Team
- (United States) Webcor Builders
