= Nathan O'Neill =

Australian cyclist

Personal information
- Born: 23 November 1974 (age 51) Sydney, Australia
- Height: 1.77 m (5 ft 10 in)
- Weight: 72 kg (159 lb; 11.3 st)

Cycling career
- Sport: Cycling
- Current team: Retired
- Discipline: Road
- Role: Rider
- Rider type: Time trialist

Professional teams
- 1999: Navigare–Gaerne (stagiaire)
- 2000–2002: Ceramica Panaria–Gaerne
- 2003: Saturn Cycling Team
- 2004: Colavita–Bolla Wines
- 2005: Navigators Insurance
- 2006–29 Oct 2007: Health Net–Maxxis
- 2009: Fly V Australia
- 2010: Bahati Foundation Pro Cycling Team

Major wins
- (Australia) National Time Trial Champion x8
Medal record
Representing Australia
Men's road bicycle racing
Commonwealth Games
Bronze medal – third place	2002 Manchester	Time trial
Gold medal – first place	2006 Melbourne	Time trial

Nathan Brian O'Neill (born 23 November 1974) is an Australian former professional road racing cyclist. During his career, O'Neill became an eight-time winner of the Australian National Time Trial Championships and an Olympian in the 2000 Sydney Olympic Games.

== Early life ==
O'Neill was born in Sydney in 1974. He began cycling in 1989, when he attended a 16 kilometre handicap race before school, following the suggestion by a friend. He went on to win numerous medals in the junior ranks at the Australian National Track Championships. At the Junior UCI Track Cycling World Championships in 1992, O'Neill won the bronze medal as part of the team pursuit squad. In 1995, he won the silver medal in the road time trial at the Oceania Cycling Championships whilst nursing a broken pelvis. He was an Australian Institute of Sport scholarship holder.

== Career ==
From 1 September 1999, he rode for the Navigare – Gaerne team as a trainee rider before turning professional for the team in 2000 at the age of 25, under new sponsors Panaria – Gaerne. He represented Australia at the 2000 Summer Olympics, finishing 19th in the individual time trial. He stayed with the same team for 2001–2002, under Panaria – Fiordo's sponsorship. O'Neill won the bronze medal in the individual time trial at the 2002 Commonwealth Games in Manchester, United Kingdom.

In 2003, O'Neill signed with the Saturn Cycling Team, 2004 for Colavita – Olive Oil, 2005 for Navigators Insurance Cycling Team and finally for Health Net Pro Cycling Team in 2006.

At the Commonwealth Games in Melbourne, Australia, 21 March 2006, O'Neill won the Gold Medal in the Time Trial finishing in a time of 48:37.29.

He became the Australian National Time Trial Champion for the eighth time in January 2007, it was the fourth consecutive time.

=== Adverse Finding ===
On 12 August 2007, at the Tour of Elk Grove, O'Neill provided a sample which tested positive for the appetite suppressant drug phentermine. O'Neill received notification of this on 23 September 2007. Later, the B sample also tested positive, he admitted that he had used the medicine for the prescribed purpose out of competition. The drug was not banned for use out-of-competition, and O'Neill maintains that his error is due to a longer than expected clearance time for the drug, compounded by another supplement which increased his urinary pH that he was also taking in the days leading up to the event. On 6 November 2007, O'Neill was terminated by the Health Net Pro Cycling Team.

On 13 June 2008 the Court of Arbitration for Sport (CAS) ruled that O'Neill bore "no significant negligence" in registering a positive finding for Phentermine, and was given a 15-month suspension, from 12 August 2007 to 12 November 2008.

The Australian Sports Anti-Doping Authority (ASADA), the World Anti-Doping Agency (WADA) and the UCI jointly appealed to the CAS to increase the suspension period "on the grounds that the athlete had not demonstrated no significant fault or negligence". The CAS also stated that "Also of importance is the evidence from Mr O'Neill that he took the risk because he was of the view that without Phentermine he was not going to be competitive. Mr O'Neill therefore self-medicated with a view of gaining a competitive advantage." The suspension was extended to the maximum period of two years, due to come to end on 13 June 2010.

== Personal life ==
O'Neill currently lives with his wife, Betty, in Athens, Georgia, in the United States. In 2012, they founded Dingo Race Productions, LLC. Race productions include Tour of the Southern Highlands, In 2016, he started OnEdge Sportsales, LLC with Betty, his then fiancé. OnEdge Sportsales is an independent sales agency, representing multiple top brands throughout the Southeast. O'Neill has a daughter, born in 2006 to his former wife.

== Major achievements ==
1994
1st Time trial, National Road Championships
1996
1st Time trial, National Road Championships
1st Stage 5 Tour of Japan
4th Time trial, UCI Under-23 Road World Championships
1997
1st GP Industria Commercio e Artigianato Aglianese Internazionale
1998
1st Time trial, National Road Championships
1999
2nd Overall Tour of Tasmania
2000
1st Stage 4 (ITT) Tour of Sweden
2001
1st Firenze–Pistoia
1st Stage 10 (ITT) Tour de Langkawi
3rd Overall Circuit de Lorraine
2002
1st Time trial, National Road Championships
3rd Time trial, Commonwealth Games
4th Firenze–Pistoia
2003
1st Overall Sea Otter Classic

1st Stage 2

Redlands Bicycle Classic

1st Mountains classification
1st Prologue & Stage 2

1st Stage 1 (ITT) Tour de Langkawi
1st Canadian Open Road Championships
3rd Overall Tour of Georgia

1st Prologue

2004
1st Time trial, National Road Championships
2nd Overall Tour de Beauce

1st Stage 5a

2005
1st Time trial, National Road Championships
1st Overall Tour de Beauce

1st Stage 4a (ITT)

1st Stage 4 (ITT) Tour de Langkawi
1st Stage 3 (ITT) Cascade Cycling Classic
8th Overall Tour de Georgia
2006
1st Time trial, Commonwealth Games
1st Time trial, National Road Championships
1st Overall Redlands Bicycle Classic

1st Stage 4 (ITT)

1st Overall Mt. Hood Cycling Classic
5th Overall Tour of California
7th Overall Tour de Georgia
2007
1st Time trial, National Road Championships
1st Overall Tour of the Gila

1st Stage 1 (ITT)

1st Overall Mt. Hood Cycling Classic

== See also ==
- List of doping cases in cycling
- List of sportspeople sanctioned for doping offences
