= Tom Danielson =

American road bicycle racer (born 1978)

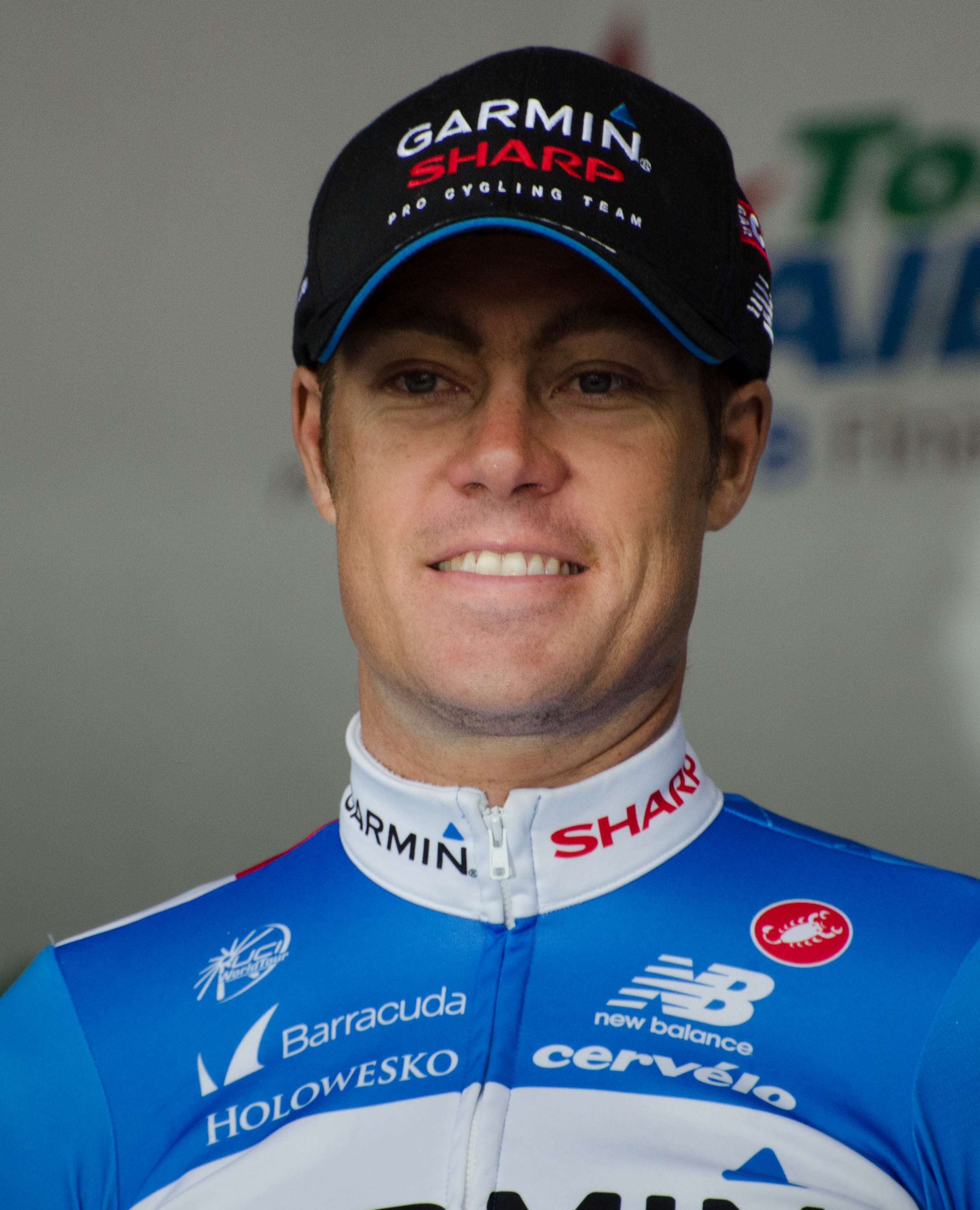
- Danielson at the 2014 Tour of Alberta

Personal information
- Full name: Thomas Danielson
- Nickname: Tom or Tommy D
- Born: March 13, 1978 (age 48) East Lyme, Connecticut, U.S.
- Height: 1.77 m (5 ft 10 in)
- Weight: 62 kg (137 lb)

Cycling career
- Sport: Cycling
- Current team: Retired
- Discipline: Road
- Role: Rider
- Rider type: Climber

Amateur team
- 1999–2001: SoBe/Headshok

Professional teams
- 2002: Mercury Cycling Team
- 2003: Saturn Cycling Team
- 2004: Fassa Bortolo
- 2005–2007: Discovery Channel
- 2008–2015: Slipstream–Chipotle

Major wins
- Tour of Qinghai Lake (2002); Tour de Langkawi (2003); Cascade Cycling Classic (2003); Mount Evans Hill Climb (2004, 2007, 2009); Tour of Utah (2013, 2014)

Thomas Danielson (born March 13, 1978) is an American retired professional road racing cyclist who competed professionally between 2002 and 2015 for the Mercury Cycling Team (2002), the Saturn Cycling Team (2003), Fassa Bortolo (2004), Discovery Channel (2005–2007) and Cannondale–Garmin (2008–2015). He had been suspended twice for doping in his career.

== Career ==
=== Early years ===
Danielson held the record for the fastest ascent of Mount Washington New Hampshire, in the Mount Washington Auto Road Bicycle Hillclimb, prior to records being reset by the organizers in 2022. The previous record holder was professional cyclist Tyler Hamilton. He also holds the record for the Mount Evans Hill Climb in Colorado, which traverses the highest paved road in North America. Another previous record holder was Jonathan Vaughters, who was Danielson's manager on his last professional team.

In 2004, Danielson had an uneventful stint on the Italian UCI ProTeam Fassa Bortolo, missing the early spring campaign because of visa problems. Subsequently, he raced for the American UCI ProTour team Discovery Channel, with which he won the 2005 Tour de Georgia and the 2006 Tour of Austria. After Discovery Channel disbanded at the end of 2007, Danielson became part of the Slipstream–Chipotle team.

=== 2010 ===
Danielson started the season by finishing twelfth at both the Tour Méditerranéen and the Tour du Haut Var. Following his two twelfth-place finishes, Danielson, however, struggled through Paris–Nice, finishing only fifty-second overall. Following, Paris–Nice, Danielson regained his form at the Tour of the Gila, placing second to Levi Leipheimer (Team RadioShack). A couple of weeks later, Danielson rode the Tour of California, but was unable to complete the race. After California, Danielson returned to form at the Tour de Suisse, finishing twenty-fifth overall. Following Suisse, Danielson finished in eighth place at both the Tour de Pologne and the Trofeo Melinda. A month later, Danielson rode his fifth Vuelta a España. He completed the race as the highest placed American, in eighth place. Danielson concluded the season with a thirty-ninth place at the Giro dell'Emilia.

=== 2011 ===
Danielson started the season with the Vuelta a Mallorca, and finished thirty-sixth in the third classic, the Trofeo Deia. Danielson, however, was unable to complete the fourth and fifth classics, the Trofeo Magaluf-Palmanova and the Trofeo Inca. Following the Spanish races, Danielson finished thirty-first overall at the Volta ao Algarve, and a preseason best of twentieth overall at the Vuelta a Murcia. However, after Murcia, Danielson's form deteriorated, finishing fifty-fifth overall at the Volta a Catalunya, forty-seventh at the GP Miguel Induráin, and eightieth overall at the Tour of the Basque Country. Danielson withdrew from racing after these races, and focused on rebuilding his form. A few weeks later, Danielson returned to racing, and finished twentieth overall at the Tour de Romandie. Danielson finished third overall at the Tour of California, and ninth overall at the Tour de Suisse, which ultimately led him to a Tour de France debut. At the Tour, Danielson rode well, and finished as the highest placed American, in eighth place. After the Tour, Danielson finished fifth overall at the Tour of Utah, and fourth overall at the inaugural USA Pro Cycling Challenge. Following the two American stage races, Danielson concluded the season with an eighty-sixth place at the Grand Prix Cycliste de Montréal.

=== 2012 ===
After being unable to complete the Tour de Langkawi, Danielson returned to form during the Volta a Catalunya, where he finished twelfth overall, and second in the mountains classification. Following Catalunya, Danielson finished twentieth at the Tour of the Basque Country, and offered a good showing at the Tour of California, where he took fifth place in the "queen stage" of the race, a finish at altitude at the winter ski station of Mount Baldy. He also came in ninth place in stage five's individual time trial, therefore keeping a high placing in the overall classification. These performances helped him climb to third overall. After California, Danielson finished eleventh at the United States National Road Race Championships, seventh at the Tour de Suisse, and was selected to start his second Tour de France. However, due to injuries sustained from crashes, Danielson abandoned the Tour during stage six. The following month, Danielson returned to competition at the Tour of Utah, where he finished eleventh overall, and assisted with stage two's team time trial win. After Utah, Danielson competed in the USA Pro Cycling Challenge, where he finished seventh overall, and by soloing up and over Independence Pass, won stage three. Bicycling subsequently named the stage, "the most exciting day of road racing on American soil".

=== 2013 ===
Following his six-month ban, Danielson returned to racing at the Volta a Catalunya, where he finished tenth overall. After Catalunya, Danielson, however, was unable to complete the GP Miguel Induráin, but returned to form during the Tour of the Basque Country, where he finished eleventh overall. Danielson continued to ride strong, and finished fourth overall at the Tour de Romandie. Danielson started the Giro d'Italia hoping to assist teammate Ryder Hesjedal in a repeat victory, however, Hesjedal withdrew following stage twelve. After Hesjedal's departure, Danielson was able to ride for himself, but fell ill during the latter weeks, and finished only 49th overall. In June, Danielson was selected to start his third Tour de France as a domestique; he finished the Tour in 60th place. Following the Tour, Danielson competed in, and won the Tour of Utah. Danielson concluded the season by finishing third overall at the USA Pro Cycling Challenge.

=== 2014 ===
In August, Danielson returned to racing at the Tour of Utah and won the general classification for the second consecutive year. He also finished second at the USA Pro Cycling Challenge in August. The following month, Danielson confirmed his participation in the Icon LASIK Tour of the Moon.

=== 2015 ===
For 2015 cycling events, Danielson was sponsored by Cannondale, Full Speed Ahead (FSA), Icon Lasik, Mavic, Smith Optics, Prestige Imports, Vega Sport and Biotta.

On January 20, 2015, actor Patrick Dempsey and Tom Danielson hosted a cycling event in Arizona called "Ride On, Tucson!" featuring a 2.5-mile (4.0-kilometre) downtown circuit that was completely closed to traffic for three hours.

In March, Danielson won the mountains classification at the Volta a Catalunya. In May, Danielson abandoned the Giro d'Italia because of a knee injury.

== Doping ==
In a September 2012 online-forum post, Garmin–Sharp team manager and owner Jonathan Vaughters stated that Danielson had used blood doping products to increase oxygen delivery to his muscles. On October 10, 2012, the United States Anti-Doping Agency (USADA) announced that Danielson would be suspended for six months after admitting to doping during his time with Discovery Channel. Later that day, the organization issued a statement confirming his acceptance to a six-month ban from September 1, 2012, to March 1, 2013. The action included the stripping of all race results between March 1, 2005, and September 23, 2006. Danielson released his own statement a day later that expressed regret at his decision to "cross the line." "I accept responsibility for my choices and apologize to everyone in my life for them – in and out of the sport", he said.

In August 2015, Danielson revealed he tested positive for synthetic testosterone. In October 2016, he accepted a four-year suspension for "unintentionally consuming" dehydroepiandrosterone.

== Personal ==
Born in East Lyme, Connecticut, Danielson currently resides in Longmont, Colorado. After spending his childhood years in Connecticut, Danielson attended Fort Lewis College in Durango, Colorado.

In May 2023, Danielson had a finger amputation and left hand reconstruction to remove a cancerous tumor. Danielson's X post said "Gave the middle finger to cancer!".

=== Sponsorships ===
In 2013, Danielson signed a sponsoring agreement with Icon Lasik, a Colorado-based provider of cataract, LASIK, as well as the organizer of Tour of the Moon. The contract was signed after he had won 2013 Tour of Utah.

In August 2014, he signed a sponsorship contract with Cannondale Bicycle Corporation for 2015, together with 13 other riders, as a part of the new relationship between Cannondale Bicycle Corporation, the American bicycle manufacturer, and Slipstream Sports, the sports management group behind the Garmin–Sharp UCI ProTeam.

He also has sponsorship agreements with Mavic, Smith Optics, Prestige Imports, Vega Sport and Biotta.

== Major results ==
2001
1st Collegiate Mountain Bike Championships
2002
1st Collegiate Mountain Bike Championships
1st Overall Tour of Qinghai Lake

1st Stages 5 & 8

1st Mount Washington Auto Road Bicycle Hillclimb
2003
1st Overall Tour de Langkawi
1st Overall Cascade Cycling Classic
1st Overall International Tour de Toona
1st Mount Washington Auto Road Bicycle Hillclimb (Note: New course record.)
2nd Time trial, National Road Championships
2nd Sea Otter Classic
3rd Overall Redlands Bicycle Classic
5th Overall Tour de Georgia
5th Overall Nature Valley Grand Prix

1st Stage 2

2004
1st Mount Evans Hill Climb

Voided between March 1, 2005 and September 23, 2006.

2005
~~1st Overall Tour de Georgia~~

~~1st Stage 5~~

~~4th Overall Setmana Catalana de Ciclisme~~
~~5th Overall Tour de Langkawi~~
~~7th Overall Tour of Austria~~
~~7th Overall Vuelta a España~~
2006
~~1st Overall Tour of Austria~~
~~2nd Overall Tour de Georgia~~

~~1st Stage 5~~

~~6th Overall Vuelta a España~~

~~1st Stage 17~~

~~8th Overall Tour of California~~
~~9th Overall Tour de l'Ain~~
~~10th Overall Tirreno–Adriatico~~

2007
1st Mount Evans Hill Climb
2008
1st Stage 4 (TTT) Tour de Georgia
5th Time trial, National Road Championships
5th Overall Tour of Missouri
2009
1st Mount Evans Hill Climb
3rd Overall Vuelta a Burgos

1st Stage 4 (ITT)

9th Overall Tour of California
2010
2nd Overall Tour of the Gila
8th Overall Vuelta a España
8th Trofeo Melinda
9th Overall Tour de Pologne
2011
3rd Overall Tour of California
4th Overall USA Pro Cycling Challenge
5th Overall Tour of Utah
8th Overall Tour de France

1st Stage 2 (TTT)

9th Overall Tour de Suisse
2012
1st Stage 2 (TTT) Tour of Utah
3rd Overall Tour of California
7th Overall Tour de Suisse
7th Overall USA Pro Cycling Challenge

1st Stage 3

2013
1st Overall Tour of Utah
3rd Overall USA Pro Cycling Challenge
4th Overall Tour de Romandie
10th Overall Volta a Catalunya
2014
1st Overall Tour of Utah

1st Stage 4

2nd Overall USA Pro Cycling Challenge
2015
1st Mountains classification Volta a Catalunya
2026
1st Overall Superior Criterium (M40+)
5th Overall Tour of the Gila (Cat 1-2) (1st in 40+, 1st on Stage 2: Inner Loop Road Race),

=== Grand Tour general classification results timeline ===
| Grand Tour | 2005 | 2006 | 2007 | 2008 | 2009 | 2010 | 2011 | 2012 | 2013 | 2014 | 2015 |
|---|---|---|---|---|---|---|---|---|---|---|---|
| Giro d'Italia | ~~DNF~~ | ~~DNF~~ | — | — | 78 | — | — | — | 49 | — | DNF |
| Tour de France | — | — | — | — | — | — | 8 | DNF | 60 | — | — |
| / Vuelta a España | ~~7~~ | ~~6~~ | DNF | — | DNF | 8 | — | — | — | — | — |

Legend
| DSQ | Disqualified |
| DNF | Did not finish |
| ~~struck~~ | Voided |

== See also ==
- List of doping cases in cycling
