= David Clinger =

American cyclist (born 1977)

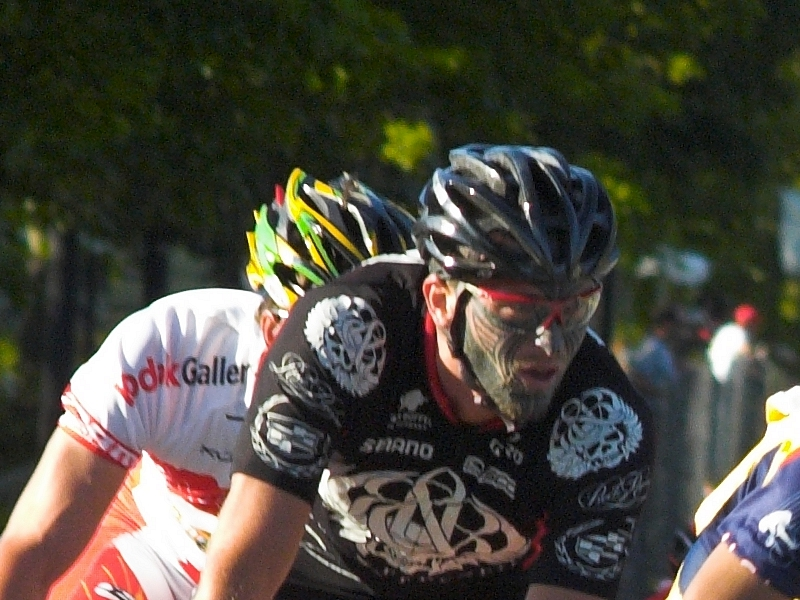

Personal information
- Full name: David Clinger
- Born: November 22, 1977 (age 48) Los Angeles

Cycling career
- Sport: Cycling
- Discipline: Road
- Role: Rider

Professional teams
- 1998-1999: Mercury Cycling Team
- 2000-2001: Festina-Lotus
- 2002: US Postal Service
- 2003: Prime Alliance Cycling Team
- 2004: Domina Vacanze
- 2005: Webcor Builders Cycling Team
- 2007-2008: Rock Racing

David Clinger (born November 22, 1977, in Los Angeles) is a former professional road racing cyclist from the United States. He represented his native country at the 1999 Pan American Games in Winnipeg, Manitoba, Canada.

In 2010, the U.S. Anti-Doping Agency banned him for 2 years for use of synthetic testosterone and modafinil. In August 2011, David Clinger was issued a lifetime doping ban by the U.S. Anti-Doping Agency (USADA) after testing positive during a random test while serving a prior doping ban. Clinger accepted responsibility for using clenbuterol for performance-enhancing purposes, USADA said. The second violation prompted USADA to issue the lifetime competition ban.

== Major results ==
1996
3rd in Prologue Tour of Japan (JPN)
1997
3rd in Stage 2 McLane Pacific Classic, Footshill Road Race (USA)
1998
1st in Woodland Hills and 1st in Snake Alley Criterium (USA)
3rd in General classification Hotter'N Hell Hundred and 3rd in Nevada City Classic (USA)
1999
1st in General Classification Tour de Toona (USA)
2nd in Snelling (USA)
3rd in Stage 6 Vuelta Ciclista Asturias, Oviedo (ESP)
2nd in Wilmington Classic (USA)
1st in Stage 4 part b Tour de Beauce, Saint Georges (CAN)
4th in Pan American Games, Winnipeg (CAN)
2000
3rd in Stage 3 Volta Ciclista a Catalunya, Badalona (ESP)
2nd in Stage 1 Vuelta a Galega, Ferrol (ESP)
2nd in Stage 3 Vuelta a Galega, Fonsagrada (ESP)
1st in Stage 4 Vuelta a Galega, Orense (ESP)
2nd in Memorial Manuel Galera (ESP)
2001
1st in Prueba Villafranca de Ordizia (ESP)
2002
1st in Stage 1 Volta Ciclista a Catalunya, Deltebre (ESP)

alongside Tom Boonen, George Hincapie, Roberto Heras, Christian Vande Velde, Michael Barry, Matt White, and Chann McRae

1st in First Union Invitational (USA)
2003
3rd in Stage 3 Pomona Valley Stage Race, Puddington (USA)
2nd in Stage 3 Redlands Bicycle Classic, Panorama Point (USA)
2nd in Stage 3 Tour de Georgia, Rome (USA)
1st in Stage 5 Tour de Georgia, Atlanta (USA)
1st in Stage 2 Tour of Connecticut, Waterbury circuit (USA)
1st in General Classification Tour of Connecticut (USA)
3rd in United States National Championship, Road, Elite, United States of America, Philadelphia (USA)
1st in Stage 1 Cascade Classic, Pacific Power Road Race (USA)
1st in Stage 5 Cascade Classic, Leffel Centre Anbrey Butte (USA)
3rd in New York City Championship (USA)
2005
3rd in Stage 1 Sea Otter Classic, Laguna Seca (USA)
3rd in Stage 1 Vuelta de Bisbee, Sulphur Springs (USA)
2nd in Stage 3 Vuelta de Bisbee, Tombstone (USA)
3rd in Stage 3 Tour of the Gila, Inner Loop (USA)
1st in Santa Barbara (USA)
1st in San Marcos (USA)
1st in Long Beach (b) (USA)
1st in Long Beach (c) (USA)
3rd in Univest Grand Prix (USA)
3rd in Stage 2 Bermuda GP (BER)
2008
2nd in Stage 2 Valley of the Sun Stage Race, Casa Grande (USA)
3rd in Sea Otter Classic (USA)
1st in Bonsall-San Luis Rey Classic (USA)
