= Fred Rodriguez =

American cyclist (born 1973)

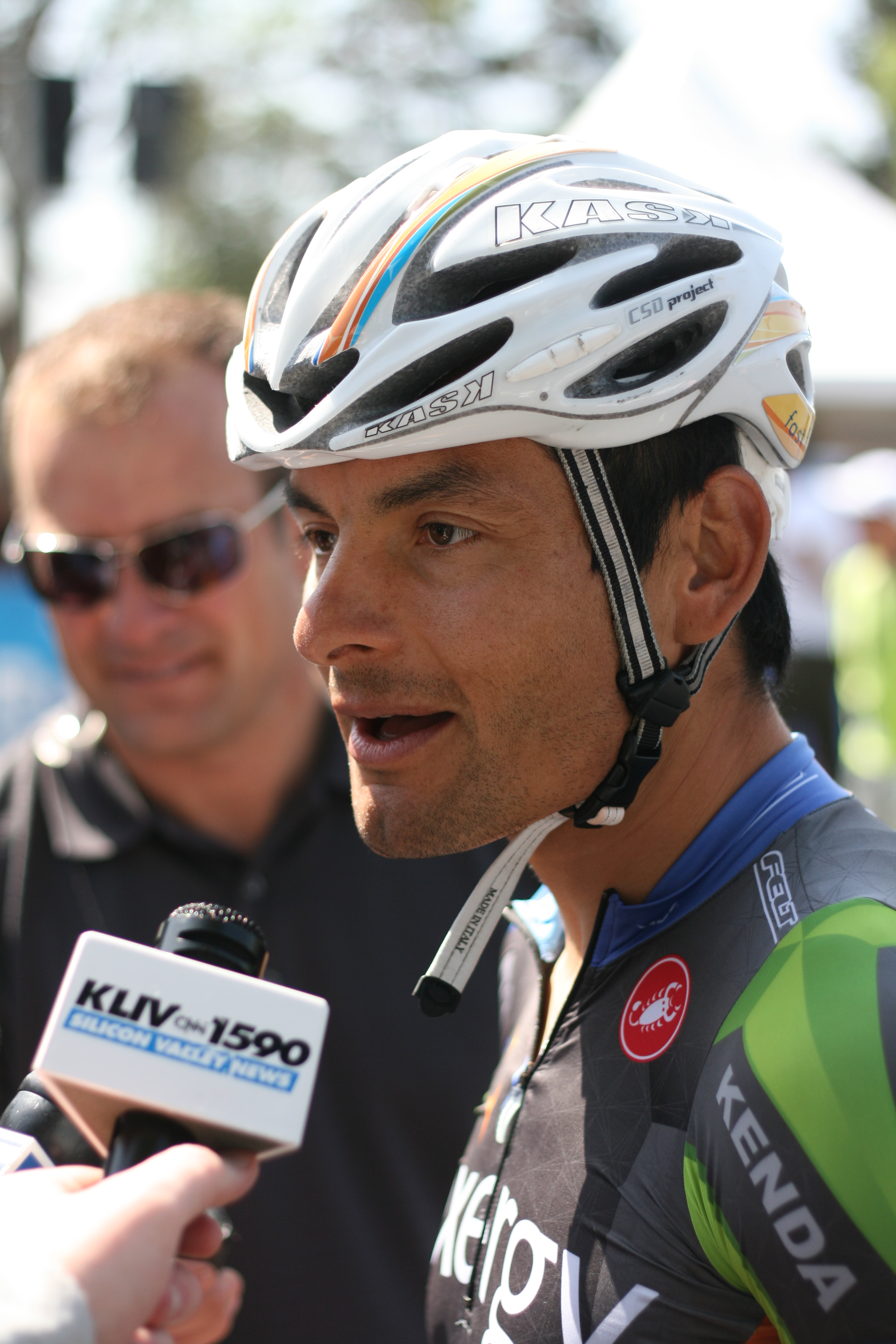
- Rodriguez at the 2012 Tour of California

Personal information
- Full name: Fred Rodriguez
- Nickname: Fast Freddie
- Born: September 3, 1973 (age 53) Bogotá, Colombia
- Height: 1.78 m (5 ft 10 in)
- Weight: 69 kg (152 lb)

Cycling career
- Sport: Cycling
- Current team: Retired
- Discipline: Road
- Role: Rider
- Rider type: Sprinter

Professional teams
- 1996–1998: Saturn Cycling Team
- 1999–2000: Mapei–Quick-Step
- 2001–2002: Domo–Farm Frites–Latexco
- 2003: Vini Caldirola–So.di
- 2004: Acqua & Sapone
- 2005–2007: Davitamon–Lotto
- 2008–2009: Rock Racing
- 2011–2012: Team Exergy
- 2013–2015: Jelly Belly–Kenda

Major wins
- Grand Tours Giro d'Italia 1 individual stage (2004) One-day races and Classics National Road Race Championships (2000, 2001, 2004, 2013)
Medal record
Representing United States
Pan American Games
Bronze medal – third place	1995 Mar del Plata	Road race

Fred "Freddie" Rodriguez (born September 3, 1973) is an American former professional road racing cyclist. His nickname, Fast Freddie, is due to his reputation as a sprint specialist. Rodriguez won the United States National Road Race Championships four times, and won four stages at the Tour de Georgia. He competed in the men's individual road race at the 2000 Summer Olympics.

Other notable results include high stage finishes in all three Grand Tours as well as second places in both in both Milan–San Remo and Gent–Wevelgem in 2002. Rodriguez participated in all three Grand Tours including the Giro d'Italia and Vuelta a España one time each where he had multiple stage podiums in the Vuelta and won stage 9 of the 2004 Giro d'Italia. He started the Tour de France seven times finishing it twice, and while he never won any stages he was often competitive on sprint stages with several top 5's.

Rodriguez retired at the end of the 2015 season.

== Major results ==
1991
1st Road race, National Junior Road Championships
1995
1st Lancaster Classic
1st Stage 3b Regio-Tour
2nd Redlands Bicycle Classic
3rd Road race, Pan American Games
1996
1st International Cycling Classic
1st Stage 5 Tour of China
2nd Road race, National Road Championships
3rd US Pro Championship
1997
1st Stage 4 Redlands Bicycle Classic
8th Overall Internationale Niedersachsen-Rundfahrt
1998
7th Overall Tour de Langkawi

1st Stages 2 & 5

1999
1st Schaal Sels
1st Stage 1b Tour de Langkawi
2nd Road race, National Road Championships
4th Overall G.P. Portugal Telecom
5th Overall Volta ao Algarve
6th Philadelphia International Championship
8th Overall Settimana Internazionale Coppi e Bartali
8th Giro del Piemonte
2000
1st Road race, National Road Championships
1st First Union Classic
Tour de Suisse

1st Points classification
1st Stage 2

2nd Overall Niedersachsen-Rundfahrt

1st Stages 7 & 10

2nd US Pro Championship
3rd Overall UNIQA Classic

1st Points classification
1st Stage 3

3rd First Union Invitational
4th GP de Fourmies
10th Overall 4 Jours de Dunkerque

1st Stage 5

2001
1st Road race, National Road Championships
1st Philadelphia International Championship
1st US Pro Championship
2nd GP de Fourmies
3rd Overall Tour de Luxembourg

1st Stage 1

3rd Grand Prix Pino Cerami
4th Scheldeprijs
8th Overall Guldensporentweedaagse
8th First Union Classic
2002
2nd Milan–San Remo
2nd Gent–Wevelgem
5th GP Ouest–France
8th Overall Tour du Poitou-Charentes
9th E3 Prijs Vlaanderen
2003
2nd Overall Tour de Georgia

1st Points classification
1st Stages 3 & 4

2nd G.P. Costa degli Etruschi
4th Overall International Tour of Rhodes

1st Stage 2

4th Reading Classic
4th Wachovia Classic
9th Paris–Tours
2004
1st Road race, National Road Championships
1st Wachovia Classic
1st Reading Classic
1st Stage 9 Giro d'Italia
2nd Grand Prix of San Francisco
2nd Coppa Bernocchi
3rd Lancaster Classic
3rd Wachovia Invitational
8th Stausee-Rundfahrt Klingnau
2005
2nd Lancaster Classic
2nd Reading Classic
2nd Wachovia Invitational
2nd Wachovia Classic
4th Road race, National Road Championships
4th Overall GP Costa Azul

1st Stage 1

4th Philadelphia International Championship
6th Doha International GP
2006
Tour de Georgia

1st Points classification
1st Stage 4

2007
1st Stage 6 Tour de Georgia
1st Stage 3 Tour of Elk Grove
4th Road race, National Road Championships
2008
3rd Philadelphia International Championship
6th Lancaster Classic
6th Commerce Bank Lehigh Valley Classic
2011
4th Overall Tour of Elk Grove
2012
3rd Philadelphia International Championship
2013
1st Road race, National Road Championships
7th Overall Nature Valley Grand Prix

=== Grand Tour general classification results timeline ===
Grand Tour	2000	2001	2002	2003	2004	2005	2006	2007
Giro d'Italia	—	—	—	—	99	—	—	—
Tour de France	86	DNF	DNF	DNF	—	132	DNF	DNF
Vuelta a España	—	—	—	—	—	—	109	—

Did not finish = DNF.

Sporting positions
Preceded by Marty Jemison	United States National Road Race Championships; Winner; 2000–2001	Succeeded by Chann McRae
Preceded by Mark McCormack	United States National Road Race Championships; Winner; 2004	Succeeded by Chris Wherry
Preceded by Timmy Duggan	United States National Road Race Championships; Winner; 2013	Succeeded by Eric Marcotte
