= Gordon Fraser (cyclist) =

Canadian cyclist

Gordon “The Flash” Fraser
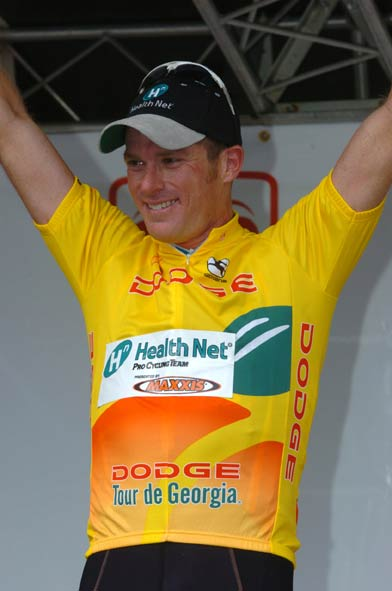

Personal information
- Full name: Gordon Harold Fraser
- Born: 19 November 1968 (age 57) Ottawa, Ontario, Canada
- Height: 1.75 m (5 ft 9 in)
- Weight: 71 kg (157 lb)

Cycling career
- Sport: Cycling
- Current team: Retired
- Discipline: Road
- Role: Rider; Directeur sportif
- Rider type: Sprinter

Professional teams
- 1994–1996: Motorola Cycling Team
- 1997: Mutuelle de Seine-et-Marne
- 1998–2002: Mercury Outdoor Life Network
- 2003–2006: Health Net–Maxxis

Managerial teams
- 2009: Team Type 1
- 2010: UnitedHealthcare–Maxxis
- 2011: Realcyclist.com Cycling Team
- 2015–2018: Silber Pro Cycling Team
- 2019: Floyd's Pro Cycling
- 2022–: Israel Cycling Academy

Gordon "Gord" Harold Fraser (born November 19, 1968) is a Canadian former professional road racing cyclist. As a rider he specialised in sprinting.

Fraser is a three-time Olympian and four-time Commonwealth Games participant and has over 200 career wins including becoming the 2004 Canadian national road race champion. He also rode in the 1997 Tour de France and won the US National Race Calendar series twice. He retired from professional cycling at the end of the 2006 season after racing four seasons for the Health Net Pro Cycling Team Presented by Maxxis.

He went on to be a directeur sportif with Team Type 1 in 2009, and joined UnitedHealthcare-Maxxis as a directeur sportif in 2010. In 2011 became DS for the US Continental team, Realcyclist.com. Whilst there he guided Francisco Mancebo to the top of the National Race Calendar individual standings in 2011 and again in 2012 (under the team's new name of Competitive Cyclist Racing Team). However he left the team when it merged with Kenda-5 Hour Energy ahead of the 2013 season. Subsequently he was approached by Team Exergy to work for them in 2013, however this fell through when Exergy withdrew its sponsorship of the team. In 2014 he worked for Team SmartStop at the USA Pro Cycling Challenge, and took the directeur sportif role at the Silber Pro Cycling Team for several races on a part-time basis, before signing a two-year deal with the squad in September of that year. After it emerged that Silber would disband at the end of the 2018 season, Floyd Landis announced that Fraser would serve as manager of his new UCI Continental team, Floyd's of Leadville. After leaving the scene for two years, Fraser was announced to become the head directeur sportif of the NSN Development Team team for the 2022 season, replacing Zak Dempster.

Fraser resides in Tucson, Arizona and has two sons named Angus and Axel.

== Major results ==
1992
1st Stage 5 Niederösterreich Rundfahrt
1994
1st Paris–Troyes
1st Paris–Chauny
1st Stages 2, 4 & 5 Tour de Normandie
1st Stages 2 & 5 Tour du Vaucluse
1995
5th Trofeo Luis Puig
1997
1st Stage 4 Grand Prix du Midi Libre
5th Paris–Mantes
10th Le Samyn
1998
1st Stage 2 Vuelta a Asturias
1st Stages 1 & 4 Redlands Bicycle Classic
1st Stage 1 Killington Stage Race
1st Stage 1 Tour de Beauce
1st Stage 4 Tour de Toona
2nd Overall Sea Otter Classic
1999
1st Overall Tucson Bicycle Classic

1st Stages 1 & 2

Tour Trans Canada

1st Stages 2, 3, 6, 8 & 9
1st Points classification

1st Stages 3 & 5 Redlands Bicycle Classic
1st Stages 2 & 7 International Cycling Classic
1st Stage 5 Tour de Beauce
1st Stage 4 Tour de Toona
1st Stage 2 Fitchburg Longsjo Classic
2nd Road race, Pan American Games
2nd Road race, Pan American Road Championships
2nd Overall Sea Otter Classic
3rd Athens Twilight Criterium
7th First Union Classic
2000
1st Athens Twilight Criterium
1st GP de la Ville de Rennes
1st Stage 1 Critérium International
1st Overall Valley of the Sun Stage Race

1st Stages 1 & 3

1st Overall Tour de Toona

1st Stages 1, 2, 3 & 4

1st Prologue & Stage 3 Sea Otter Classic
2nd Road race, National Road Championships
2nd First Union Classic
8th Philadelphia International Cycling Classic
2001
1st Stage 1 Tour de Langkawi
1st Stage 2 Tour de Beauce
1st Stage 2 Redlands Bicycle Classic
1st Prologue & Stage 3 Tour de Toona
2nd Clarendon Cup
2002
1st First Union Classic
1st Overall Tucson Bicycle Classic

1st Stages 1, 2 & 3

1st Athens Twilight Criterium
1st Manhattan Beach Grand Prix
1st Stage 1 Valley of the Sun Stage Race
1st Stage 2 Sea Otter Classic
1st Stage 6b Tour de Beauce
3rd Overall USA Cycling National Racing Calendar
2003
1st Gastown Grand Prix
1st Stages 1 & 3 Tour of the Gila
1st Stage 3 Tour de Beauce
1st Stage 1 Tucson Bicycle Classic
1st Stage 1 Redlands Bicycle Classic
1st Stages 2, 3 & 4 Pomona Valley Stage Race
3rd Manhattan Beach Grand Prix
2004
1st Road race, National Road Championships
1st Stages 1 & 7 Tour de Georgia
1st Points classification, Tour de Langkawi
1st Stage 4 Cascade Cycling Classic
2nd Overall USA Cycling National Racing Calendar
2nd CSC Invitational
2nd Wachovia Classic
3rd Philadelphia International Championship
2005
1st Wachovia Classic
1st Gastown Grand Prix
1st Stage 6 Tour de Georgia
1st Historic Roswell Criterium
1st Stage 1 Cascade Cycling Classic
1st Stage 4 Nature Valley Grand Prix
2nd Overall San Dimas Stage Race

1st Stage 2

2nd Overall Sea Otter Classic

1st Stage 2

3rd Overall Tour de Delta

1st Stage 3

2006
1st Overall Joe Martin Stage Race

1st Stages 1, 2 & 4

1st Historic Roswell Criterium
1st Stage 3 Tour of the Gila
1st Stage 3 Tour de Delta
1st Stage 3 Central Valley Classic
3rd Overall Tour of Elk Grove
3rd Athens Twilight Criterium
