= 2003 Tour de Georgia =

Race details
- Dates: April 22 – April 27
- Stages: 6
- Distance: 975.7 km (606.3 mi)
- Winning time: 23h 01' 36"

Results
	Winner	Chris Horner (USA)	(Saturn Cycling Team)
	Second	Fred Rodriguez (USA)	(Saunier Duval)
	Third	Nathan O'Neill (AUS)	(Saturn Cycling Team)
	Points	Fred Rodriguez (USA)	(Saunier Duval)
	Mountains	Chris Horner (USA)	(Saturn Cycling Team)
	Youth	Saul Raisin (USA)	(Ofoto-Lombardi Sports)
	Team	(United States) Saturn Cycling Team	

The 2003 Tour de Georgia was the inaugural edition of what has now become the highest ranked bicycle road racing event in the United States. The six-stage race was held April 22 through April 27, 2003, with the overall title won by Chris Horner of the Saturn Cycling Team. American Fred Rodriguez (Vini Caldirola–So.di) claimed the points jersey for sprinters. Also, Horner won the King of the Mountains competition for climbers. Saul Raisin won the Best Young Rider competition.

== Stages ==
Prologue
4.2 km Circuit Race, Savannah, Georgia
Winner: Nathan O'Neill, Australia, Saturn Cycling Team

Stage 1
220 km Stage Race, Augusta to Macon
Winner: Henk Vogels, Australia, Navigators Cycling Team

General classification after stage 1:

1. Henk Vogels (Aus) Navigators Cycling Team 5.33.16
2. Nathan O'Neill (Aus) Saturn Cycling Team 0.01
3. Chris Horner (USA) Saturn Cycling Team 0.03

Stage 2
199 km Stage Race, Macon to Columbus
Winner: Moreno Di Biase, Italy, Formaggi Pinzolo Fiavé

General classification after stage 2:

1. Henk Vogels (Aus) Navigators Cycling Team 9.40.57
2. Chris Horner (USA) Saturn Cycling Team 0.04
3. Nathan O'Neill (Aus) Saturn Cycling Team 0.05

Stage 3
222 km Stage Race, Pine Mountain/Callaway to Rome
Winner: Fred Rodriguez, United States, Vini Caldirola–So.di

General classification after stage 3

1. Henk Vogels (Aus) Navigators Cycling Team 15.08.35
2. Chris Horner (USA) Saturn Cycling Team 0.06
3. Nathan O'Neill (Aus) Saturn Cycling Team 0.07

Stage 4
196 km Stage Race, Dalton to Gainesville
Winner: Fred Rodriguez, United States, Caldirola-Sidermec-Saunier Duval

General classification after stage 4

1. Chris Horner (USA) Saturn Cycling Team 19.57.57
2. Nathan O'Neill (Aus) Saturn Cycling Team 0.12
3. Roland Green (Can) US Postal presented by Berry Floor 0.18

Stage 5
142 km Circuit Race, Atlanta, Georgia
Winner: David Clinger, United States, Prime Alliance Cycling Team

== Final results ==
=== General Classification ===
	Cyclist	Country	Team	Time
1	Chris Horner	United States	Saturn Cycling Team	23h 01'36"
2	Fred Rodriguez	United States	Vini Caldirola–So.di	+ 0'07"
3	Nathan O'Neill	Australia	Saturn Cycling Team	+ 0'13"
4	Michael Barry	Canada	U.S. Postal Service presented by Berry Floor	+ 0'22"
5	David Zabriskie	United States	U.S. Postal Service presented by Berry Floor	+ 0'25"
6	Tom Danielson	United States	Saturn Cycling Team	+ 0'26"
7	Alan Iacuone	Australia	Flanders-IteamNova.com	+ 1'11"
8	David Clinger	United States	Prime Alliance Cycling Team	+ 1'29"
9	John Lieswyn	United States	7UP / Maxxis	+ 1'38"
10	Scott Guyton	New Zealand	Flanders-IteamNova.com	+ s.t.

=== Points Classification ===
	Cyclist	Country	Team
1	Fred Rodriguez	United States	Caldirola-Sidermec-Saunier Duval

=== King of The Mountains Classification ===
	Cyclist	Country	Team
1	Chris Horner	United States	Saturn Cycling Team

=== Team competition ===
1. (United States) Sierra Nevada Clif Bar
2. (United States) Prime Alliance Cycling Team
3. (United States) Rabobank
4. (United States) Flanders-IteamNova.com Cycling Team
5. (United States) 7UP / Maxxis
6. (United States) Jelly Belly Carlsbad Clothing
7. (United States) Saturn Cycling Team
8. (United States) OFOTO Lombardi Sports
9. (Italy) Formaggi Pinzolo
10. (United States) Schroeder Iron Cycling Team
11. (United States) West Virginia Pro Cycling
12. (United States) Navigators Insurance Cycling Team
13. (Italy) Vini Caldirola–So.di
14. (Netherlands) Dutch National Cycling Team
15. (United States) U.S. Postal Service Pro Cycling Team presented by Berry Floor
16. (United States) Colavita Bolla
17. (United States) Webcor Builders
