= Bobby Julich =

American cyclist

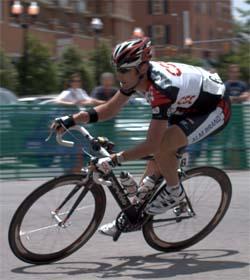

Personal information
- Full name: Robert Julich
- Nickname: Bobby J
- Born: November 18, 1971 (age 54) Corpus Christi, Texas, United States of America
- Height: 1.81 m (5 ft 11 1/2 in)
- Weight: 72 kg (159 lb; 11 st 5 lb)

Cycling career
- Sport: Cycling
- Current team: Retired
- Discipline: Road
- Role: Rider
- Rider type: Time-trialist/Climber

Amateur team
- 1988–1991: US National Team

Professional teams
- 1992: Spago
- 1994: Chevrolet
- 1995–1996: Motorola
- 1997–1999: Cofidis
- 2000–2001: Crédit Agricole
- 2002–2003: Team Telekom
- 2004–2008: Team CSC

Major wins
- Grand Tours Tour de France 1 TTT stage (2001) Giro d'Italia 1 TTT stage (2006) Stage races Paris–Nice (2005) Eneco Tour (2005) Critérium International (1998, 2005)
Medal record
Men's road bicycle racing
Representing United States
Olympic Games
| Silver medal – second place | 2004 Athens | Road time trial |

Robert "Bobby" Julich (/ˈdʒuːlɪk/ JOO-lik; born November 18, 1971), popularly called Bobby Julich, is an American former professional road bicycle racer who last rode for Team CSC in the UCI ProTour racing series. He got his international breakthrough when he finished 3rd overall in the 1998 Tour de France, becoming only the second American to finish on the podium. He is a strong time trialist who won a silver medal at the 2004 Olympic Individual Time Trial, and combined with his high versatility he has won a number of stage races on the international circuits including the 2005 edition of Paris–Nice. In September 2008, he announced his retirement as a professional cyclist.

He served as a technical director for Team Saxo Bank until November 2010, when it was announced that he would move to Team Sky for the 2011 season as a race coach. On October 25, 2012, Team Sky announced that Julich would part ways with the team due to his admission to doping in the past. This departure is therefore in line with Team Sky's policy (re-asserted in the wake of the USADA Reasoned Decision and subsequent UCI/Lance Armstrong fall-out) of asking all current team personnel to admit to any past doping offences. After leaving Sky Julich worked as a coach for CCC Pro Team in 2014 before being announced by Team Tinkoff–Saxo as the team's head coach (Directeur Sportif) for 2015, however in August 2015 he confirmed that he would leave the team at the end of the year.

== Biography ==
Born in Texas, Julich has resided in Glenwood Springs, Colorado, since childhood, with a brief time in Philadelphia, where he met his wife. Most of his living relatives reside in the New York area. Bobby Julich got his start in cycling winning the Red Zinger Mini Classics youth bicycle race in 1985. As an amateur cyclist Bobby Julich won the 1990 Junior National Cyclo-Cross Championship, and as a member of the US National Team he participated in the 1991 Tour DuPont. At the time it was the biggest stage race in the United States, and Julich finished 5th overall in a race which included fellow American cyclist and 3-time Tour de France winner Greg LeMond. Bobby won the award for the Best Young Rider and was heralded as the next LeMond.

After a few "false" starts as a professional, he joined the Motorola team in 1995 alongside Italian rider Andrea Peron and fellow Americans Lance Armstrong and George Hincapie. In the 1996 season, Bobby Julich was diagnosed with re-entrant supraventricular tachycardia (RSVT), a heart condition which meant his heart would beat much faster than normal. Julich was treated with radiofrequency ablation and was ready for the 1996 Vuelta a España late in the season, a race which showed the first glimpses of his potential in international professional cycling. There, Julich held the King of the Mountains jersey for ten stages. Despite a strong performance he relinquished the jersey but did finish 9th overall, the highest placing ever by an American in the Vuelta up until Lance Armstrong finished 4th overall in 1998. It was this performance that made other teams in the peloton take notice of Julich.

When Motorola ended its sponsorship at the end of the 1996 season he joined the French Cofidis team with a few fellow Motorola teammates, including Lance Armstrong. Armstrong's cancer meant that he was not able to compete with the team, while Julich went on to participate in the 1997 Tour de France. He performed well in this Tour, getting stronger as it progressed taking two top 10s in late mountain stages including one where he finished only behind the podium finishers Richard Virenque, Marco Pantani and Jan Ullrich. Then in the final ITT he placed 4th to finish the Tour in 17th overall.

The embattled 1998 Tour de France was a breakthrough for Julich, when he took over the team leadership from Italian Francesco Casagrande. Following the doping scandal of the 1998 Tour, only 96 of 189 riders completed the race, and Julich finished third on the podium with winner Pantani and runner-up Ullrich. Julich was hailed as the next American Tour de France champion and he was once more proclaimed to follow in the footsteps of Greg LeMond. The 1999 Tour de France saw Julich as one of the favorites for the overall win, but a crash during an individual time trial forced him to quit the race, which was in turn won by the recovered Lance Armstrong.

For the 2000 season, Julich moved to another French team Credit Agricole, joining compatriot Jonathan Vaughters. He was part of the Credit Agricole team that won the team time trial stage of the 2001 Tour de France. After a move to Team Telekom of Germany in 2002, Julich rode as a domestique in support of his team captain Jan Ullrich. Julich only enjoyed lacklustre results, and at the end of the 2003 season he contemplated retiring.

Despite an offer below his wages at Team Telekom, Bobby Julich moved to the Danish outfit Team CSC in the 2004 season, where he joined up with former Motorola teammate Andrea Peron. He once again rode as a supporting rider in the Tour de France, but with the freedom to pursue his own chances during the rest of the season. Julich immediately saw his riding and performance improve, as he won a time-trial in the April 2004 race Tour of the Basque Country, his first victory since the 1998 season. With Team CSC teammate Jens Voigt, a rider Julich rode with in his time at Credit Agricole, he also won the two-man time trial LuK Challenge. Bobby Julich won a silver medal in the 2004 Summer Olympics men's individual time trial event behind Russian Viatcheslav Ekimov.

Julich's renaissance continued in 2005 with his best-ever professional season, becoming the first American to win Paris–Nice. He also won the Critérium International and the Eneco Tour, making Julich the 8th ranked rider in the UCI ProTour, helping Team CSC become the highest ranked team of 2005.

For the 2006 season, Julich planned to conserve energy for helping Team CSC captain Ivan Basso in his winning bid for both the 2006 Giro d'Italia in May and 2006 Tour de France in July. Even though he did not start his season as strongly compared to 2005, he managed to finish 3rd at the Tour of California in February and he won the prologue of Paris–Nice in March, results that even positively surprised Julich himself. For the very first Giro d'Italia participation in his career, Julich had early aspirations of conquering the pink jersey for the leader of the general classification early in the race to lessen the pressure on Basso. However, Julich suffered heavily from pollen allergy throughout the race, and he did not play a major role himself, but focused on helping Ivan Basso, as Basso won the 2006 Giro. In the 2006 Tour de France, Julich abandoned the race after he suffered a crash on the stage 7 individual time trial. He went into a turn too fast, slid on small pebbles, and he severely injured his wrist when falling.

In May 2011, Tyler Hamilton, the winner of the men's time trial at the 2004 Summer Olympics, confessed that he had used doping products, and returned his gold medal. On August 10, 2012, Bobby Julich was upgraded from the bronze to the silver medal.

In May 2013, he joined BMC Racing Team as a consultant. In November 2014, it was announced that Julich would join Tinkoff–Saxo as head coach, reuniting with Sean Yates (former sports director of Team Sky) and team founder and manager Bjarne Riis. Julich and Yates left after Riis's firing later in 2015.

== Doping ==
On October 25, 2012, Julich admitted to "using EPO several times from August 1996 until July 1998" and resigned from the United Kingdom-based Team Sky. The team had issued a statement asking both riders and support staff to sign a document verifying that they did not use or administer performance-enhancing drugs during their careers. Julich stated that he wished to continue to be involved in the sport to some extent, and also that he would pay the consequences for his poor decisions.

Julich did his self-confession at CyclingNews. His open letter told that during the Tour de France of 1998 his fiancée (now wife) discovered his use from another rider's wife. She told him if it would reoccur, the relationship would be over. His name was also on the list of doping tests published by the French Senate on 24 July 2013 that were collected during the 1998 Tour de France and found suspicious for EPO when retested in 2004.

== Major results ==
1988
1st Overall Tour de l'Abitibi
1989
1st Overall Tour de l'Abitibi
1st Overall Trofeo Karlsberg
1991
5th Overall Tour DuPont
1992
10th Overall Tour DuPont
1994
7th Overall Tour DuPont
1996
7th Overall Escalada a Montjuïc
9th Overall Vuelta a España
10th Japan Cup
1997
1st Overall Tour de l'Ain

1st Stage 5b (ITT)

Route du Sud

1st Stages 2a & 2b (ITT)

1998
1st Overall Critérium International
2nd Overall À travers Lausanne
2nd Overall Tour du Limousin
2nd Polynormande
3rd Overall Tour de France
5th Züri-Metzgete
6th Grand Prix Eddy Merckx
1999
2nd Trophée des Grimpeurs
5th Grand Prix Pino Cerami
10th Overall Route du Sud
2000
2nd Overall Tour Méditerranéen
5th EnBW Grand Prix (with Jens Voigt)
6th Overall Circuit de la Sarthe
2001
1st Stage 5 (TTT) Tour de France
3rd Gran Premio di Lugano
5th Grand Prix Eddy Merckx
9th Overall Circuit de la Sarthe
9th Overall Tour du Limousin
9th Overall Tour Méditerranéen
2002
7th Breitling Grand Prix (with Kevin Livingston)
2003
3rd LuK Challenge Chrono (with Alexander Vinokourov)
6th GP Triberg-Schwarzwald
2004
1st LuK Challenge Chrono (with Jens Voigt)
2nd Time trial, Olympic Games
2nd Grand Prix Eddy Merckx (with Jens Voigt)
3rd Overall Paris–Nice
4th Overall Tour of the Basque Country

1st Stage 5b (ITT)

4th Overall Critérium International
2nd Overall Tour de Georgia
5th Overall Ronde van Nederland
8th Overall Tour Méditerranéen
2005
1st Overall Paris–Nice
1st Overall Critérium International

1st Stage 3 (ITT)

1st Overall Eneco Tour

1st Stage 7 (ITT)

1st LuK Challenge Chrono (with Jens Voigt)
1st Stage 4 (TTT) Tour Méditerranéen
4th Overall Tour de Georgia
5th Overall Tour of the Basque Country
9th Overall Tour Méditerranéen
2006
1st Prologue Paris–Nice
1st Stage 5 (TTT) Giro d'Italia
1st Eindhoven Team Time Trial
3rd Overall Tour of California
6th LuK Challenge Chrono (with Jens Voigt)
2007
1st Stage 2 (TTT) Deutschland Tour
1st Eindhoven Team Time Trial
2nd Overall Sachsen Tour
4th Overall Tour of California
National Road Championships

5th Time trial
8th Road race

7th Klasika Primavera
2008
10th Overall Tour de Georgia

=== Grand Tour general classification results timeline ===
| Grand Tour | 1996 | 1997 | 1998 | 1999 | 2000 | 2001 | 2002 | 2003 | 2004 | 2005 | 2006 |
|---|---|---|---|---|---|---|---|---|---|---|---|
| Giro d'Italia | — | — | — | — | — | — | — | — | — | — | 92 |
| Tour de France | — | 17 | 3 | DNF | 48 | 18 | 37 | — | 40 | 17 | DNF |
| / Vuelta a España | 9 | — | — | DNF | — | — | — | 95 | — | — | — |

Legend
| — | Did not compete |
| DNF | Did not finish |
