= Presbyterian Hospital Invitational Criterium =

Race details
- Date: August
- Region: Streets of Uptown, Charlotte, North Carolina, United States
- Local name(s): Charlotte Criterium
- Type: Criterium

History
- First edition: 2004
- Editions: 5 (2009)
- First winner: Men's (Cuba) Ivan Dominguez; Women's (Germany) Ina Tuentenburg
- Most wins: (United States) Tina Pic (2) 2006-07
- Most recent: Men's (United States) Jake Keough; Women's (United States) Theresa Cliff-Ryan

The Presbyterian Hospital Invitational Criterium, or Charlotte Criterium, is an annual criterium bicycle race along an 1.2 miles (2 km) course located in Uptown, Charlotte, North Carolina, United States. With the inaugural race occurring in 2004, this was known as the Bank of America Criterium through the 2006 race, when the name and sponsorship was changed to its current name for the 2007 event. Its $125,000 purse is the largest for this type of event in the United States. The race serves as a benefit for the Brain Tumor Fund of the Carolinas, and is an officially sanctioned race as part of the USA CRITS Tour.

== Men's winners ==
The men's criterium runs along a course along Tryon Street between 2nd and 7th Streets throughout Uptown Charlotte. The race has a total distance of 50 miles (80 km).

Year	Winner	Country	Time	Notes
2004	Ivan Dominguez	Cuba	2:00:51.3	
2005	Juan Jose Haedo	Argentina	1:51:16.2	
2006	Shawn Milne	United States	1:58:45.4	
2007	Frank Pipp	United States	1:55:19	
2008	Alejandro Borrajo	Argentina		
2009	David Veilleux	Canada		
2010	Jonathan Cantwell	Australia	1:52:55	
2011	Jake Keough	United States	1:55:35	

== Women's winners ==
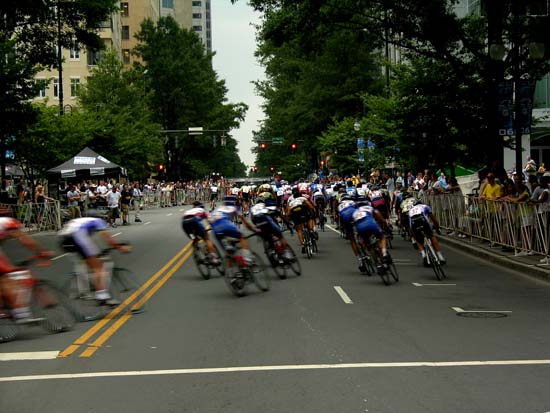
2006 Bank of America Criterium on Tryon Street

The women's criterium runs along the same course as the men's at a distance of 25 miles (40 km).

Year	Winner	Country	Time	Notes
2005	Ina-Yoko Teutenberg	Germany	1:02:09	
2006	Tina Pic	United States	57:22.7	
2007	Tina Pic	United States	59:59.2	
2008	Katharine Carroll	United States		
2009	Brooke Miller	United States	54:56	
2010	Theresa Cliff-Ryan	United States	55:40	
2011	Theresa Cliff-Ryan	United States	1:01:04	
