= R.K. Sehgal =

Indian-American business executive, civil servant, and author

Raghbir "R.K." Sehgal
- Born: Moradabad, India
- Citizenship: United States
- Education: Auburn University (B.S., Civil Engineering)
- Occupations: Engineer, entrepreneur, public official
- Known for: CEO of Law Companies Group and H.J. Russell & Company; Commissioner of the Georgia Department of Industry, Trade and Tourism; Founder of the Tour de Georgia
- Awards: Grammy Award

Raghbir "R.K." Sehgal is an Indian-American business executive, civil servant, author, recording artist, and producer.

Sehgal was the chairman and CEO of multinational engineering conglomerate Law Companies Group, and the first non-family CEO of H.J. Russell & Company. He later served as the chairman and commissioner of the Georgia Department of Industry, Trade, and Tourism (later renamed Georgia Department of Economic Development), during which time he founded the Tour de Georgia cycling race.

He is the Los Angeles Times and San Francisco Chronicle bestselling author of the memoir Close the Loop: The Life of an American Dream CEO and His Five Lessons for Success. He won the Grammy for Best Audio Book, Narration & Storytelling Recording at the 67th Annual Grammy Awards for producing Last Sundays in Plains: A Centennial Celebration.

== Early life and education ==
Sehgal was born in Moradabad, India. At age 16, with ten dollars in his pocket, he left India for the United Kingdom, where he had early work experience as a laborer at a Goodyear Tire plant. He eventually immigrated to the United States to pursue his university education, arriving in New York City on New Year's Day.

He graduated with a degree in civil engineering from Auburn University. While studying at the university in the early 1960s, he became acquainted with Lillian Gordy Carter–mother of future President Jimmy Carter–who was serving as a dormitory housemother, beginning a long-standing association with the Carter family.

== Business career ==
=== Law Companies Group ===
Sehgal joined Law Engineering in 1963 in the firm's Birmingham, Alabama office. He went on to become the chairman and CEO in 1985. During his decade-long tenure as CEO, the firm's annual revenue grew from $50 million to over $400 million. In 1989, he led Law's strategic acquisition of Sir Alexander Gibb & Partners, a British civil engineering firm.

Sehgal recruited a high-level leadership to the board of Law Companies Group, including former UN Ambassador and Atlanta mayor Andrew Young, who served as vice-chairman; former Georgia governor Joe Frank Harris; former EPA Administrator Lee M. Thomas; former White House advisor John Ehrlichman.

Law Companies Group was involved in infrastructure work related to the 1996 Centennial Olympic Games in Atlanta. Sehgal recruited Andrew Young, co-chairman of the Atlanta Committee for the Olympic Games (ACOG), to lead the firm's international division, and the company underwrote much of Young's international Olympic outreach.

=== H.J. Russell & Company ===
In 1996, Sehgal was named CEO of H.J. Russell & Company, the largest Black-owned construction and real estate firm in the US, by founder Herman J. Russell. Sehgal became the first non-family member to lead the company, with his appointment reported in the media as part of an effort to professionalize the firm's management and prepare Russell's children for future leadership.

== Public service ==
In the late 1990s, Sehgal entered public service, first serving as the chairman of the board for the Georgia Department of Industry, Trade, and Tourism, and subsequently as the commissioner of the department. During his tenure, he led the negotiations in the recruitment of a $750 million DaimlerChrysler cargo van plant to Pooler, Georgia.

He also conceived the idea for and founded the Tour de Georgia, a professional international cycling stage race to promote the state's geography and tourism.

== Literary and media career ==
Sehgal is the author of the memoir Close the Loop: The Life of an American Dream CEO and His Five Lessons for Success (2020) with his son Kabir Sehgal. The book features a foreword by President Jimmy Carter and an afterword by Ambassador Andrew Young. It reached the bestseller lists for both the Los Angeles Times and the San Francisco Chronicle. A feature-length documentary based on the memoir, also titled Close the Loop, was featured on opening night of the Atlanta Film Festival in 2022.

Sehgal is a Grammy Award winner for his work as a producer on Last Sundays in Plains: A Centennial Celebration (2024), which featured the final Sunday School lessons of President Jimmy Carter and musical contributions by LeAnn Rimes, Darius Rucker, Keb' Mo', and Jon Batiste. As a recording artist, Sehgal has released two albums focused on meditation and mindfulness, Make It Happen: Affirmations To Help You Get There (2024) and Make It Happen: Affirmations To Help You Get There (Instrumentals) (2025).
