= 2009 OUCH–Maxxis season =

2009 OUCH-Maxxis season

Previous season • Next season

OUCH Pro Cycling Team Presented by Maxxis (UCI identifier: OCM) was run by Momentum Sports Group and based in the United States. The team was sponsored principally by OUCH Sports Medical Center, and Maxxis. Floyd Landis, with his doping suspension ended, joined the team this year. OUCH is the medical office which performed his hip surgery.

The team's first test was the Amgen Tour of California, a race which Landis won back in 2006. This year it saw Landis race against former US Postal teammate Lance Armstrong. Landis finished in 23rd place, the best performance of the team.

On August 16, John Murphy won the U.S. National Criterium in Downers Grove, IL. They were a little shorthanded, with only five OUCH teammembers participating. Less than 500m from the finish, teammate Karl Menzies crashed, skidding out on pavement wet from the rain. The day before, Karl took 2nd place in the Downers Grove Pro-Am.

Karl Menzies won the overall at the Tour of Elk Grove. He gained the lead in stage 2 in which he finished 2nd.

At the Tour of Utah, in August, Brad White picked up the King of the Mountains jersey in stage 1, eventually losing the classification to Alex Howes of Felt-Holowesko Partners. The team ended up in 2nd place for the team competition. White received as well, the Most Aggressive jersey at stage 4 of the Tour of Mississippi, and the Most Courageous at stage 3 of the Tour of California.

Rory Sutherland was voted 2009 Domestic Male Roadie of the Year by magazine VeloNews in the November issue, after coming in third in the NRC individual standings. Rory won first place in the general classification of the Nature Valley Grand-Prix, 3 seconds ahead of Tom Zirbel of Bissell Pro Cycling. For him, this event included 2nd place in the stage 1 time trial, and 3rd in the Stillwater Criterium of stage 6.

== Team members ==
=== 2009 team ===
Rider	Date of birth
Jonathan Chodroff (USA)	May 5, 1985 (age 39)
Cameron Evans (CAN)	January 10, 1984 (age 41)
Tim Johnson (USA)	August 5, 1977 (age 47)
Roman Kilun (UZB)	November 27, 1981 (age 43)
Floyd Landis (USA)	October 14, 1975 (age 49)
Bobby Lea (USA)	October 17, 1983 (age 41)
Pat McCarty (USA)	January 24, 1982 (age 43)
Karl Menzies (AUS)	June 17, 1977 (age 47)
John Murphy (USA)	December 15, 1984 (age 40)
Andrew Pinfold (CAN)	August 14, 1978 (age 46)
Rory Sutherland (AUS)	February 8, 1982 (age 43)
Bradley White (USA)	January 15, 1982 (age 43)
