= Juan José Haedo =

Argentine cyclist (born 1981)

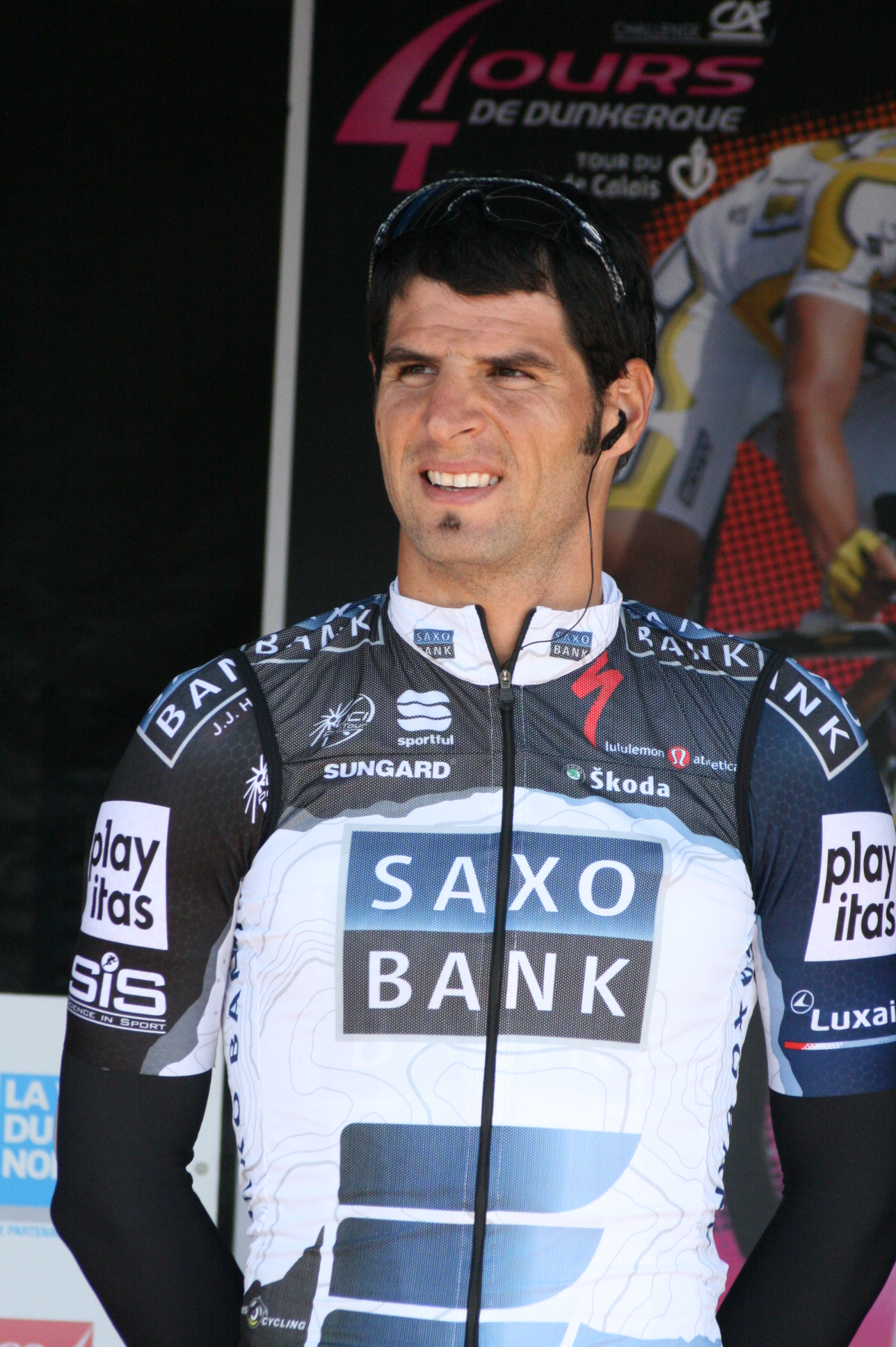
- Haedo at the 2010 Four Days of Dunkirk.

Personal information
- Full name: Juan José Haedo
- Nickname: The Slowmotion Sprinter
- Born: 26 January 1981 (age 45) Chascomús, Buenos Aires, Argentina
- Height: 178 cm (5 ft 10 in)
- Weight: 72 kg (159 lb)

Cycling career
- Sport: Cycling
- Current team: Retired
- Discipline: Road
- Role: Rider
- Rider type: Sprinter

Professional teams
- 2003–2005: Colavita–Bolla Wines
- 2006: Toyota–United
- 2007–2012: Team CSC
- 2013–2014: Jamis–Hagens Berman

Major wins
- Grand Tours Vuelta a España 1 individual stage (2011)
Medal record
Representing Argentina
Pan American Games
Bronze medal – third place	1999 Winnipeg	Team pursuit
Pan American Cycling Championships
Gold medal – first place	2000 Quito	Keirin

Juan José Haedo (born 26 January 1981) is an Argentine former professional road racing cyclist and track cyclist, who rode professionally between 2003 and 2014. He is the brother of Lucas Sebastián Haedo.

Haedo started his career on the track before turning professional on the road in 2003 with Colavita-Bolla. After a year in the United States with the Toyota - United Pro Cycling Team he joined Team CSC in 2007. Haedo had a successful career with CSC picking up notable stage wins in the Tour of California, Critérium du Dauphiné, Tirreno Adriatico and Vuelta a España. In 2010 he was granted the Konex Award Merit Diploma as one of the five best cyclist of the last decade in Argentina. He competed with the team until the end of 2012, when he joined Jamis–Hagens Berman. After retiring he stayed with the team as an assistant director.

== Major results ==
=== Road ===
2005
1st Bank of America Invitational Criterium
Redlands Classic

1st Stages 2 & 3

1st Stage 2 Fitchburg Longsjo Classic
1st Stage 6 International Cycling Classic
1st Stage 4 International Tour de 'Toona
2006
1st Tour of Somerville
1st Sunny King Criterium
Tour of California

1st Stages 1 & 4

1st Stage 6 Tour de Georgia
1st Stage 3 San Dimas Stage Race
1st Stage 3 Redlands Classic
1st Stage 5 Cascade Cycling Classic
1st Stage 4 International Tour de 'Toona
2nd Wachovia Series Lancaster Classic
4th Wachovia Series Philadelphia International Championship
2007
1st Rund um Köln
1st Colliers Classic
1st Commerce Bank International Championship
Tour of California

1st Points classification
1st Stages 2 & 6

Tour de Georgia

1st Points classification
1st Stage 7

2008
1st Clásica de Almería
Tour de San Luis

1st Stages 1 & 5

1st Stage 1 Tour of California
1st Stage 3 Vuelta a Murcia
1st Stage 6 Danmark Rundt
1st Stage 2 Tour de Georgia
1st Stage 2 Tour de Luxembourg
6th Münsterland Giro
2009
1st Cholet-Pays de la Loire
1st Stage 2 Tour de Wallonie
1st Stage 7 Tour de San Luis
1st Stage 4 Tour of Missouri
2nd Paris–Bourges
4th Overall Circuit Franco-Belge

1st Stage 4

2010
1st Rund um Köln
1st Mumbai Cyclothon
1st Stage 7 Volta a Catalunya
1st Stage 2 Critérium du Dauphiné
2011
1st Stage 16 Vuelta a España
1st Stage 3 Tirreno–Adriatico
1st Stage 2 Ster ZLM Toer
2012
1st Grand Prix de Denain
2014
1st Stage 3 Grand Prix Cycliste de Saguenay

=== Track ===
- Argentina Junior National Champion (1998/1999)
- Argentina Senior National Champion (2000/2001)
- (bronze) Olympic Sprint, Pan American Games, Canada (1999)
- (gold) Olympic Sprint, Pan American Jr. Championships, Argentina (1999)
- (gold) Sprint, Pan American Jr. Championships, Argentina (1999)
- (gold) 1 km, Pan American Jr. Championships, Argentina (1999)
- (gold) Keirin, Pan American Sr. Championships, Colombia (2000)
