= Thurlow Rogers =

American cyclist (born 1960)

Personal information
- Full name: Thurlow Thomas Rogers
- Born: March 7, 1960 (age 66) Burbank, California

Cycling career
- Sport: Cycling
- Current team: Retired
- Discipline: Road
- Role: Rider

Professional teams
- 1986: La Vie Claire
- 1987: ICN–Vitus
- 1988–1991: Sunkyong
- 1997–2000: Comptel Data Systems

Thurlow Thomas Rogers (born March 7, 1960, in Burbank, California) is an American former professional road cyclist. He competed in the men's individual road race at the 1984 Summer Olympics.

== Major results ==
1980
1st Stage 4b Circuit de la Sarthe
1983
1st Team time trial, Pan American Games
2nd Overall Settimana Ciclistica Lombarda

1st Stage 5

3rd Overall Giro delle Regioni

1st Stage 6b

1984
1st Time trial, National Road Championships
1st Milano–Mendrisio
2nd Overall Settimana Ciclistica Lombarda
6th Road race, Summer Olympics
1985
1st Stage 8 Coors Classic
1st Overall Redlands Bicycle Classic

1st Prologue & Stage 1

1986
1st Overall Mammoth Classic

1st Stage 3

3rd Road race, National Road Championships
1987
2nd Overall Redlands Bicycle Classic
1990
3rd Overall Cascade Classic
1992
3rd Overall Redlands Bicycle Classic

1st Stages 2 & 4

1996
1st Overall Joe Martin Stage Race
2nd Nevada City Classic
1998
3rd Overall Sea Otter Classic
