= Mercury Cycling Team =

American cycling team

Mercury
Team information
- Registered: United States
- Founded: 1992
- Disbanded: 2002
- Discipline: Road
- Status: GSII (1994–2000); GSI (2001); GSIII (2002)
- Bicycles: Fuji
- Website: Team home page

Key personnel
- General manager: John Wordin(1992-2001); Thurlow Rogers (2002)
- Team managers: Thurlow Rogers, Roy Knickman, Stan Barrett

Team name history
- 1992 1993 1994 1995 1996 1997 1998–1999 2000 2001 2002: Mrs. Gooch's; Miller Lite; Mrs. Gooch's; Nutra Fig; Nutra Fig-Colorado Cyclist; Comptel Data Systems-Colorado Cyclist; Mercury; Manheim Auctions-Mercury; Mercury-Viatel; Mercury

The Mercury Cycling Team was an American professional cycling team. It was founded in 1992 as an amateur team by John Wordin and Thurlow Rogers, with Mrs. Gooch's Natural Foods Markets as the lead sponsor in 1992. Before Mercury took over title sponsorship from 1998 to 2002 the team raced under various title sponsors including Miller Lite (1993), Nutra Fig (1994–1996), Comptel Data Systems (1997), and Mercury (1998-2002).

The team was named Velo News North American Team of the Year a record 7 consecutive years from 1996 to 2002 and won 535 races from 1998 to 2002. The team was disbanded after the 2002 season.

== Main riders ==
- Léon van Bon (2001)
- Baden Cooke (2000–2001)
- Tom Danielson (2002)
- Julian Dean (1998)
- Fabrizio Guidi (2001)
- Chris Horner (1993–1996, 1998–2001)
- Jans Koerts (2001)
- Floyd Landis (1999–2001)
- Peter Van Petegem (2001)
- Thurlow Rogers (1992–2002)
- Pavel Tonkov (2001)
- Jonathan Vaughters (1997)
- Henk Vogels (2000–2002)
- Steve Zampieri (2000)
- Gord Fraser (1998–2002)
- Levi Leipheimer (1997)
- Derek Bouchard-Hall (1999–2002)
- Mike Sayers (1998–2002)
- John Peters (1993–2000)
- David Clinger (1993–1999)
- Will Frischkorn (2000–2002)
- Rahsaan Bahati (2000–2002)
- Scott Moninger (1999–2002)
- Chris Wherry (2001–2002)
- Kirk Willet (1993–2000)
- Ernesto Lechuga (1998–2002)

== Junior/U23 Development riders ==
- Danny Pate (1996)
- Michael Creed (1996)
- Derek Wilkerson (1996)
- Tyler Farrar (2002)
- Wil Frischkorn (1999)
