= 2006 Tour de Georgia =

2005–06 UCI America Tour

Race details
- Dates: April 18 – April 23
- Stages: 6
- Distance: 967.9 km (601.4 mi)
- Winning time: 24h 00' 54"

Results
	Winner	Floyd Landis (USA)	(Phonak Hearing Systems)
	Second	~~Tom Danielson~~ (USA)	(~~Discovery Channel~~)
	Third	Yaroslav Popovych (UKR)	(Discovery Channel)
	Points	Fred Rodriguez (USA)	(Davitamon–Lotto)
	Mountains	Jason McCartney (USA)	(Discovery Channel)
	Youth	Janez Brajkovič (SLO)	(Discovery Channel)
	Team	(United States) Discovery Channel	

The 2006 Tour de Georgia was a six-stage race held April 18 through April 23, 2006 with the overall title won by Floyd Landis of the Phonak. American Fred Rodriguez (Davitamon–Lotto) claimed the points jersey for sprinters. Jason McCartney (Discovery Channel) won his second KOM crown; he previously won the 2004 climbers title. McCartney's teammate Janez Brajkovič won the Best Young Rider competition. Celebrity bike riders from Mountain Home, Arkansas, Gary and Zach Beck, made cameo appearances at the fifth stage to the Brasstown Bald and the final stage to Alpharetta.

== Stages ==
Stage	Route	Distance	Stage Winner	Team
1	Augusta, Georgia – Macon	207.4 km 128.9 miles	(Denmark) Lars Michaelsen	(Denmark) Team CSC
2	Fayetteville, Georgia – Rome	186.9 km 116.1 miles	(Ukraine) Yaroslav Popovych	(United States) Discovery Channel
3	Chickamauga – Chattanooga	39.9 km 24.8 miles	(United States) Floyd Landis	(Switzerland) Phonak
4	Dalton, Georgia - Dahlonega, Georgia	191.4 km 118.9 miles	(United States) Fred Rodriguez	(Belgium) Davitamon–Lotto
5	Blairsville, Georgia – Brasstown Bald	152.1 km 94.5 miles	(United States) ~~Tom Danielson~~	(United States) ~~Discovery Channel~~
6	Cumming, Georgia - Alpharetta, Georgia	190.2 km 118.2 miles	(Argentina) Juan José Haedo	(United States) Toyota–United Pro

== Teams ==
2006 Tour de Georgia

UCI ProTour Teams

- (United States) Discovery Channel
- (Denmark) Team CSC
- (Switzerland) Phonak
- (Belgium) Quick-Step–Innergetic
- (Belgium) Davitamon–Lotto
- (Spain) Saunier Duval–Prodir

UCI Professional Continental Teams

- (United States) Health Net Pro Cycling Team Presented by Maxxis
- (United States) Navigators Insurance Cycling Team

UCI Continental Teams

- (United States) Colavita Olive Oil–Sutter Home Wines Cycling Team
- (United States) Jelly Belly Cycling Team
- (United States) Jittery Joe's–Zero Gravity Cycling Team
- (United States) Kodakgallery.com–Sierra Nevada Pro Cycling Team
- (United States) TARGETRAINING
- (United States) Team TIAA–CREF
- (United States) Toyota–United Pro Cycling Team

== Final results ==
2006 general classification

1. Floyd Landis, 24.00.54
2. ~~Tom Danielson~~, ~~0.04~~
3. Yaroslav Popovych, 1.55

2006 King of the Mountain leader

1. Jason McCartney, 35 points
2. Lucas Euser, 28 points
3. ~~Tom Danielson~~, ~~12 points~~

2006 sprint leader

1. Fred Rodriguez, 48 points
2. Yaroslav Popovych, 41 points
3. Juan José Haedo, 36 points

2006 team competition

1. Discovery Channel Pro Cycling Team
2. Phonak Hearing Systems
3. Team CSC
