= Trent Lowe =

Australian road bicycle racer

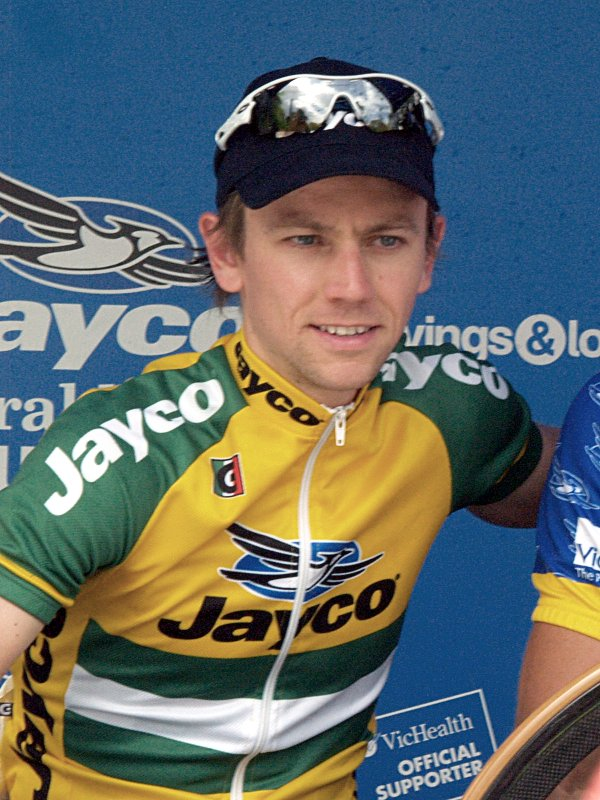
- Lowe in 2007

Personal information
- Full name: Trent Lowe
- Nicknames: 'Treva', 'T-Lowe', 'The T-Dog'
- Born: 8 October 1984 (age 42) Melbourne, Australia
- Height: 1.72 m (5 ft 8 in)
- Weight: 64 kg (141 lb)

Cycling career
- Sport: Cycling
- Discipline: Road (formerly MTB)
- Role: Rider
- Rider type: Climber/All Rounder

Professional teams
- 2005: Jittery Joe's
- 2006–2007: Discovery Channel
- 2008–2010: Garmin-Transitions

Major wins
- Junior World XC Champion (2002); Young Rider Competition Tour de Georgia (2005, 2008); U-23 XC National Mountain Bike Champion (2003, 2004)
Medal record
Representing Australia
Men's mountain bike racing
World Championships
Gold medal – first place	2002 Kaprun	Junior Cross Country

Trent Lowe (born 8 October 1984, in Melbourne) is a professional road bicycle racer from Australia. He rode for Garmin–Transitions on the UCI ProTour from 2008 to 2010. Lowe was one of only two Australians on the Slipstream Squad, the other being Chris 'CJ' Sutton who came from Cofidis in 2007. The former full-time professional mountain biker had a breakthrough year on the road in 2005 riding for the US domestic team, Jittery Joe's, where he caught eye of Discovery Channel sports manager Johan Bruyneel. He was signed for Discovery Channel for his superior climbing abilities. In 2002 he won the UCI MTB World Junior XC Championship, then he won the under-23 Australian National Mountain Bike Championship in 2003 and 2004.

Following two seasons of injury and chronic fatigue, the young climber signed with the new Australian team, Pegasus, before the announcement that they had failed to obtain a 2011 UCI World Tour license.

== Major awards ==
2000
1st U-17 XC National Mountain Bike Champion
2001
1st U-19 XC National Mountain Bike Champion
2002
1st Junior World Mountain Bike XC Champion
1st U-19 XC National Mountain Bike Champion
2003
1st U-23 XC National Mountain Bike Champion
2004
1st U-23 XC National Mountain Bike Champion
2005
1st Stage 3 Sea Otter Classic
2nd Overall Redlands Bicycle Classic

1st Stage 1

11th Overall Tour de Georgia

1st Young Rider Competition

2006
6th Overall Herald Sun Tour

1st U-23 Rider Competition

15th Overall Volta ao Algarve
2007
2nd Stage 2 Deutschland Tour
3rd Overall Herald Sun Tour

1st U-23 Rider Competition

2008
2nd Overall, Tour de Georgia

1st Stage 4 TTT
1st Young Rider Competition

13th Overall Critérium International
20th Overall Paris–Nice

10th Prologue
