= Saul Raisin =

American road bicycle racer (born 1983)

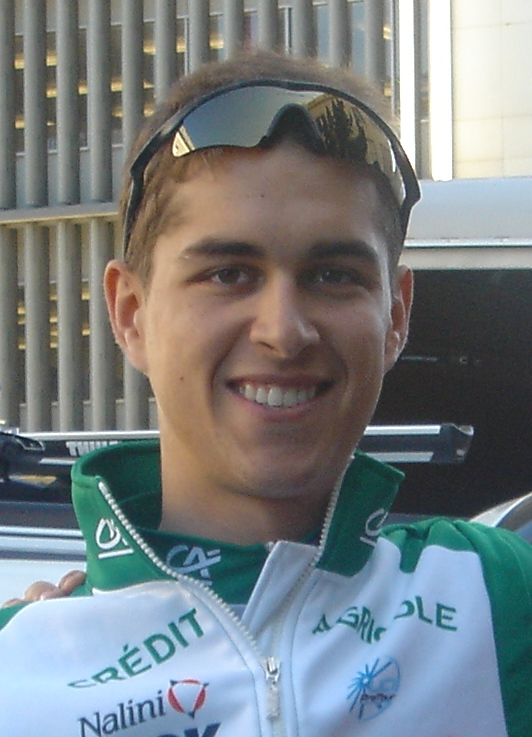

Personal information
- Full name: Saul Raisin
- Born: January 6, 1983 (age 43) United States
- Height: 1.85 m (6 ft 1 in)
- Weight: 69 kg (152 lb)

Cycling career
- Sport: Cycling
- Current team: Crédit Agricole
- Discipline: Road
- Role: Rider
- Rider type: Climber

Professional team
- 2005–2007: Crédit Agricole

Saul Raisin (born January 6, 1983) is an American former professional road bicycle racer with UCI ProTeam Crédit Agricole.

== Career ==
Raisin began racing mountain bikes at 13, and moved to road bikes when he was 17.

Raisin had a good start to his professional career with Crédit Agricole in 2005, coming 37th in the Tour de Suisse, later having the best result of his career with a 13th place in the Int. Österreich-Rundfahrt (or Tour of Austria). He then went on to win the King of the Mountains jersey in the Tour de l'Avenir.

In early 2006 Raisin won the third stage of the Le Tour de Langkawi and ended the Malaysian Tour placed eleventh overall. In 2003 Saul won Best Young Rider at the Tour de Georgia. At the 2006 Tour of California Raisin came 17th overall. He raced the Milan–San Remo in March and on April 4 was racing in the first stage of the Circuit de la Sarthe. Two kilometres from the finish Raisin clipped a wheel, crashed and landed on his head, breaking his clavicle and hip.

== 2006 crash aftermath ==
At the hospital in Angers, France, doctors took hourly CAT scans which showed that an intracranial hemorrhage had formed in Raisin's brain. A neurosurgeon operated to relieve the pressure and had to remove part of Raisin's right temporal lobe, though Raisin's autobiography contradicts this. Raisin went into a coma, emerging six days later. The hemorrhage and surgery caused significant weakness on his left side and marked memory loss. When he was stabilized he was flown from France to the Shepherd Center in Atlanta, Georgia. He stayed in the hospital for four weeks, going through extensive therapy - including re-learning to walk and eat. Afterwards he continued his therapy at the Shepherd Center outpatient program, Pathways.

Saul was not permitted to race for at least 18 months after his accident because "another blow to the head could be disastrous." In August 2006, Raisin moved from indoor training on bicycle rollers to riding outside, and in late November, Raisin completed an 8 hour, 200 kilometre ride from Chatsworth, Georgia, to Brasstown Bald, crossing 8 mountain passes. In January 2007, Raisin attended the Crédit Agricole team training camp in the South of France.

In November 2007, the Crédit Agricole team doctors stated that they could not release Saul to race. His neurological and psychiatric tests were fine, but the risk to him should he crash again is too great.

Raisin's accident and initial recovery are chronicled the book 'Tour de Life: from Coma to Competition (ISBN 0974849227) which he authored with Dave Shields.

On September 27, 2014, Saul Raisin married Lindsey Bush.

== Raisin Hope ride ==
During the 2007 Tour of California, Saul rode each stage before the main race as a promotion of his Raisin Hope Ride, a charity ride that raises money for The Shepherd Center, Camp Twin Lakes, The Brain Injury Association of Georgia and the USA Cycling Development Foundation. The first Raisin Hope Ride was held on March 31, 2007. It is Saul's intention that the ride be run annually.

Event Info: 2007, 2008, 2009

== Palmares ==
- Tour de Langkawi - 1 stage (2006)
- Tour de l'Avenir - Mountains Classification (2005)
