= Jason McCartney (cyclist) =

American cyclist (born 1973)

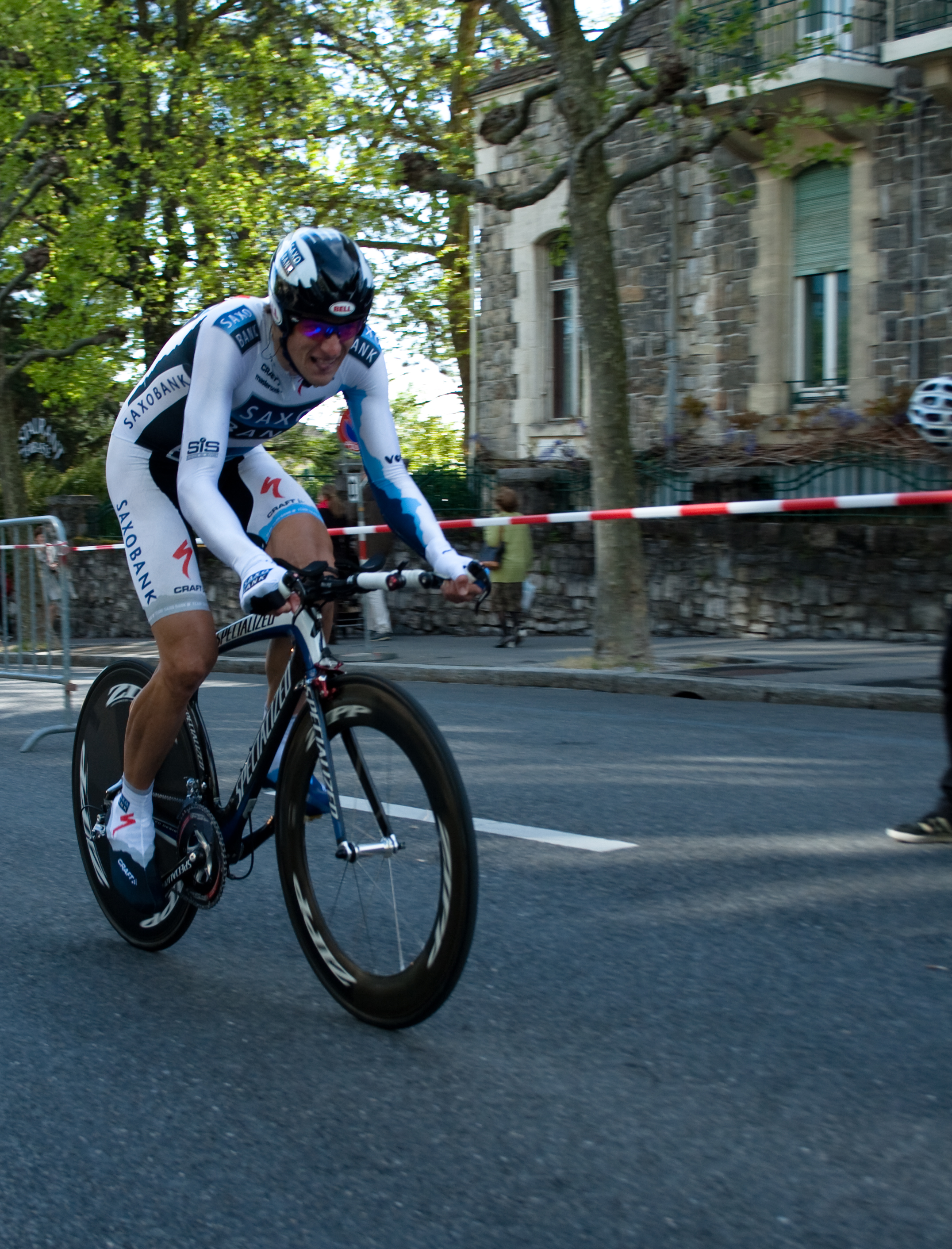

Personal information
- Full name: Jason McCartney
- Born: September 3, 1973 (age 53) United States

Cycling career
- Sport: Cycling
- Discipline: Road
- Role: Rider
- Rider type: Climber

Professional teams
- 1999–2000: NutraFig
- 2001–2002: Jelly Belly
- 2003–2004: Health Net–Maxxis
- 2005–2007: Discovery Channel
- 2008–2009: Team CSC
- 2010–2011: Team RadioShack
- 2012: UnitedHealthcare
- 2013: Bissell

Major wins
- Vuelta a España, 1 stage Tour de Georgia, 3x King of the Mountains

Jason McCartney (born September 3, 1973 in Honolulu) is an American former professional road racing cyclist, who rode professionally between 1999 and 2013 for seven different teams. His 2004 Tour de Georgia stage win led to his being named the "North American rider of the year" by VeloNews Magazine. He represented the USA Olympic team in the road racing event in 2004 and 2008. Jason is also a graduate of the National Outdoor Leadership School. He lives in Coralville, Iowa.

== Major results ==
2001
1st Overall stage Gateway Cup
2002
1st 1 stage International Tour d'Toona
1st 1 stage Tour of Kansas City
1st Wapello to Burlington Road Race
2003
1st Overall and 2 stages Joe Martin Memorial Stage Race
1st Snake Alley Criterium
1st Stage 1 Gateway Cup
1st Stage 4 Gateway Cup
2004
1st King of the Mountains Classification Tour de Georgia

1st Stage 4

1st U.S. Olympic Trials Road Race
1st King of the Mountains Competition T-Mobile International of San Francisco
1st Overall Tri-Peaks Challenge
1st Snake Alley Criterium
2005
1st King of the Mountains Classification Barclay's Global Investor Grand Prix of San Francisco
3rd Barclay's Global Investor Grand Prix of San Francisco
2006
1st King of the Mountains Classification Tour de Georgia
2007
1st, Stage 14 Vuelta a España

3rd Overall Tour of California
2008
1st King of the Mountains Classification Tour de Georgia
2009
1st King of the Mountains Classification, Tour of California
2012
1st Stage 6 Volta a Portugal
