= Redlands Bicycle Classic =

American multi-day road cycling race

Race details
- Date: April
- Region: California, U.S. (North America)
- Type: Stage race
- Web site: www.redlandsclassic.com

History
- First edition: May 25, 1985; 40 years ago
- Editions: 40 (as of 2026)
- First winner: Thurlow Rogers (USA)
- Most wins: Chris Horner (USA) (4 wins)
- Most recent: Eder Frayre (MEX)

History (women)
- First winner: Cindy Whitehead (USA)
- Most wins: Linda Brenneman (USA); Amber Neben (USA); (3 wins)
- Most recent: Lauren Stephens (USA)

The Redlands Bicycle Classic is the longest continuous running invitational, professional cycling stage race in American bike racing, located in Redlands, California, United States. The race began in 1985 after the 1984 Summer Olympic Games were held nearby in Los Angeles, in which the Team USA earned a record number of medals in cycling. It has been a foundation of the early domestic racing scene for 35 years. It consists of three road races, an individual time trial and a criterium. It is a 5-day/5-stage race that covers approximately 350 miles. The annual event is sponsored by the city of Redlands. Men and women compete in separate categories and the field is limited to 200 entrants.

In 2014, the Redlands hosted a fifth stage (and fifth day) of competition, for the first time. It had a new circuit race added to the start of the classic stage race. The 40th edition of the bicycle classic took place on April 8th thru the 12th, 2026.

== Men's winners ==
Year	Country	Rider	Team
1985	United States	Thurlow Rogers	
1986	United States	Davis Phinney	7-Eleven
1987	Norway	Dag Otto Lauritzen	7-Eleven
1988	United States	Alexi Grewal	Crest
1989	United States	Scott Moninger	Crest
1990	Russia	Dimitri Zhdanov	Russian National
1991	United States	Randy Whicker	Trek-Cytomax
1992	United States	Scott Fortner	Saturn
1993	Great Britain	Malcolm Elliott	Chevrolet/LA Sheriff
1994	Great Britain	Malcolm Elliott	Chevrolet/LA Sheriff
1995	United States	Scott Moninger	Chevrolet/LA Sheriff
1996	Poland	Tomasz Brozyna	US Postal Service
1997	Poland	Dariusz Baranowski	US Postal Service
1998	United States	Jonathan Vaughters	US Postal Service
1999	United States	Christian Vande Velde	US Postal Service
2000	United States	Chris Horner	Mercury
2001	United States	Trent Klasna	Saturn
2002	United States	Chris Horner	Prime Alliance
2003	United States	Chris Horner	Saturn
2004	United States	Chris Horner	Webcor Builders
2005	United States	Chris Wherry	Health Net
2006	Australia	Nathan O'Neill	Health Net
2007	United States	Andrew Bajadali	Jelly Belly
2008	Colombia	Santiago Botero	Rock Racing
2009	United States	Jeff Louder	BMC
2010	Australia	Benjamin Day (cyclist)	Fly V Australia
2011	Spain	Francisco Mancebo	RealCyclist.com
2012	United States	Phillip Gaimon	Kenda–5-hour Energy
2013	Spain	Francisco Mancebo	Kenda–5-hour Energy
2014	United States	Joey Rosskopf	Hincapie Sportswear Development Team
2015	United States	Phil Gaimon	Optum p/b Kelly Benefits Strategies
2016	Canada	Matteo Dal-Cin	Silber Pro Cycling Team
2017	United States	Taylor Eisenhart	Holowesko-Citadel p/b Arapahoe
2018	United States	Thomas Revard	Hagens Berman Axeon
2019	United States	Cory Lockwood	Semper Porro
2020 - 2021	No race due to COVID-19 pandemic		
2022	United States	Tyler Stites	Project Echelon Racing
2023	United States	Tyler Stites	Project Echelon Racing
2024	United States	Tyler Stites	Project Echelon Racing
2025	Mexico	Eder Frayre	Golden State Blazers
2026	Mexico	Eder Frayre	L39ION of Los Angeles

== Women's winners ==
Year	Country	Rider	Team
1993	United States	Linda Brenneman	Team Kahlua
1994	United States	Jeanne Golay	Saturn
1995	United States	Linda Brenneman	Cycle Veloce
1996	United States	Alison Dunlap	Van Wood
1997	New Zealand	Susy Pryde	Saeco–Timex
1998	United States	Mari Holden	United States (national team)
1999	Canada	Lyne Bessette	Saturn
2000	United States	Alison Dunlap	Team GT
2001	Canada	Geneviève Jeanson	Rona
2002	Germany	Judith Arndt	Saturn
2003	Canada	Geneviève Jeanson	Team Rona
2004	Canada	Lyne Bessette	Quark
2005	United States	Christine Thorburn	Webcor Builders
2006	United States	Amber Neben	SC Velo
2007	United States	Amber Neben	Stahl/SC Velo
2008	Canada	Alex Wrubleski	Webcor Builders
2009	Germany	Ina-Yoko Teutenberg	Team Columbia–High Road Women
2010	Germany	Ina-Yoko Teutenberg	Team HTC–Columbia Women
2011	United States	Amber Neben	HTC–Highroad Women
2012	United States	Megan Guarnier	Team TIBCO–To The Top
2013	United States	Alison Powers	NOW and Novartis for MS
2014	United States	Tayler Wiles	Specialized–lululemon
2015	United States	Mara Abbott	L.A. Sweat
2016	United States	Kristin Armstrong	Twenty16–Ridebiker
2017	United States	Ruth Winder	UnitedHealthcare
2018	United States	Katie Hall	UnitedHealthcare
2019	United States	Amber Neben	Trek Red Truck
2020– 2021	No race due to the COVID-19 pandemic in California		
2022	United States	Heidi Franz	InstaFund Racing
2023	United States	Emily Ehrlich	Virginia Blue Ridge Twenty24
2024	Canada	Nadia Gontova	DNA Pro Cycling
2025	United States	Alia Shafi	Fount Cycling Guild
2026	United States	Lauren Stephens	Aegis x Leaders of Enchantment
