= 2005–2008 Health Net seasons =

| 2005-2008 Health Net seasons |

Next season

Health Net Pro Cycling Team Presented by Maxxis (UCI identifier: HNM) was run by Momentum Sports Group and based in the United States.

Health Net won the team title in the 2004, 2005, 2006 and 2007 USA Cycling National Racing Calendar series competition. In 2007, Rory Sutherland captured the individual championship on the USA Cycling National Racing Calendar.

Health Net was one of nine UCI Professional Continental Teams to compete in the 2006 Tour de Georgia. In 2005 representing Health Net, Greg Henderson won the points competition in the Tour de Georgia and the International Tour de Toona. Scott Moninger and John Lieswyn have won the International Tour de Toona for Health Net in 2005 and 2004, respectively.

== Team members ==
=== 2008 team ===
| Name | Birthday | Nationality | 2007 team |
|---|---|---|---|
| Matt Crane | | United States | U.S. U23 National Team |
| Corey Collier | | United States | neo-pro |
| Matt Cooke | | United States | Navigators Insurance Cycling Team |
| Kyle Gritters | | United States | returning rider |
| Tim Johnson | | United States | returning rider |
| Roman Kilun | | United States | returning rider |
| Karl Menzies | | Australia | returning rider |
| John Murphy | | United States | returning rider |
| Kirk O'Bee | April 9, 1977 | United States | returning rider |
| Frank Pipp | | United States | returning rider |
| Rory Sutherland | | Australia | returning rider |
| Phil Zajicek | | United States | Navigators Insurance Cycling Team |

=== 2007 team ===
| Name | Birthday | Nationality | 2006 team |
|---|---|---|---|
| Kyle Gritters | | United States | returning rider |
| Tim Johnson | | United States | returning rider |
| Roman Kilun | | United States | returning rider |
| Jeff Louder | | United States | returning rider |
| Karl Menzies | | Australia | returning rider |
| Kirk O'Bee | April 9, 1977 | United States | returning rider |
| Nathan O'Neill | | Australia | returning rider |
| Matt Crane | | United States | U.S. U23 National Team |
| Russell Downing | August 23, 1978 | United Kingdom | DFL-Cyclingnews-Litespeed |
| Ryder Hesjedal | | Canada | Phonak Hearing Systems |
| Shawn Milne | | United States | Navigators Insurance Cycling Team |
| John Murphy | | United States | U.S. U23 National Team |
| Frank Pipp | | United States | Target Training |
| Rory Sutherland | | Australia | Rabobank |

=== 2006 team ===
| Name | Birthday | Nationality | 2005 team |
|---|---|---|---|
| Gord Fraser | November 19, 1968 | Canada | |
| Kyle Gritters | | United States | |
| Greg Henderson | October 9, 1976 | New Zealand | |
| Tim Johnson | | United States | |
| Mike Jones | | United States | |
| Roman Kilun | | United States | |
| Jeff Louder | | United States | |
| Karl Menzies | June 17, 1977 | Australia | |
| Scott Moninger | October 20, 1966 | United States | |
| Kirk O'Bee | April 9, 1977 | United States | |
| Nathan O'Neill | November 23, 1974 | Australia | |
| Doug Ollerenshaw | | United States | |
| Garrett Peltonen | | United States | |
| Hayden Roulston | | New Zealand | |
| Michael Sayers | | United States | |
| Alberto Tiberio | | Switzerland | |

=== 2005 team ===
| Name | Birthday | Nationality | 2004 team |
|---|---|---|---|
| Gord Fraser | November 19, 1968 | Canada | |
| James Hibbard | October 19, 1981 | United States | |
| Greg Henderson | October 9, 1976 | New Zealand | |
| Adam Craig | August 15, 1981 | United States | |
| Mike Jones | | United States | |
| Ivan Dominguez | | United States | |
| Justin England | July 15, 1978 | United States | |
| Scott Moninger | October 20, 1966 | United States | |
| Tyler Farrar | June 2, 1984 | United States | |
| Doug Ollerenshaw | | United States | |
| John Lieswyn | August 18, 1968 | United States | |
| Michael Sayers | | United States | |
| Walker Ferguson | | United States | |
