= Jittery Joe's =

American coffeehouse chain

- Jittery Joe's Logo
- Company type: Private
- Industry: Coffee Roasting and Coffee Shops
- Founded: 1994
- Headquarters: Athens, GA, USA
- Areas served: Athens-Clarke County metropolitan area and surrounding counties
- Owner: Michael Ripps
- Website: www.jitteryjoes.com

Jittery Joe's is a coffee roaster based in Athens, Georgia that sells its coffee online for home and office, in its coffee stores, and to wholesale customers. In 1994, the first Jittery Joe's opened in downtown Athens. There are nine locations in Athens and one in each of the Georgia cities of Watkinsville, Atlanta, Bethlehem, and St. Simons.

== Overview ==
The inspiration for the name "Jittery Joe's" came from an episode of The Simpsons in which Marge visits a diner with that name ("Marge on the Lam," which first aired on November 4, 1993). The founders discovered that "Jittery Joe's" wasn't trademarked, so they adopted it as the brand label of their coffee company.

Jittery Joe's expanded into the New York market in August 2009, opening a shop next door to the Laboratory Institute of Merchandising (LIM). Drawing acclaim from the New York Times within a month of opening, the store instantly became a Midtown favorite. The store closed in January 2013.

Jittery Joe's occasionally collaborates with local artists, such as with the recording of Jeff Mangum's album Live at Jittery Joe's and releasing lines of coffee for Kishi Bashi and Widespread Panic. Along with music artists, Jittery Joe's has partnered with several other local Athens businesses, such as Terrapin Beer Company, BikeAthens, and Kindercore Vinyl to create custom coffee blends. In December 2016, the company partnered with the local group Extra Special People to create Java Joy, a program to provide people with disabilities opportunities in the workforce. Jittery Joe's began teaching participants how to roast and serve coffee in 2018, then provided a mobile coffee cart which the employees use to serve the brand's coffee while engaging with local communities and events.

== Professional cycling team ==
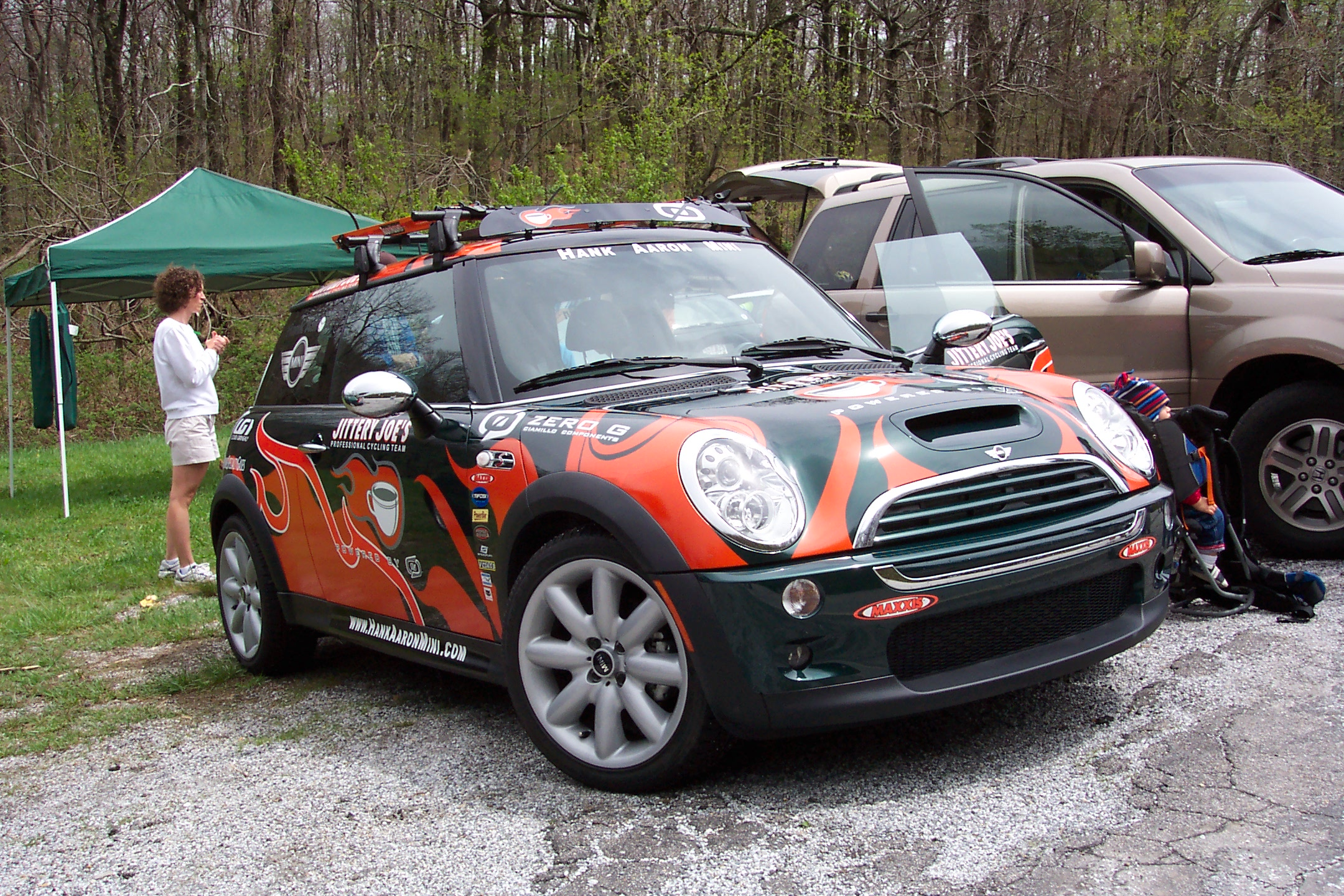
A Mini Cooper decorated in Jittery Joe's logos.

Jittery Joe's sponsors a UCI Continental team consisting of professional and amateur riders that compete primarily in USA Cycling Professional Tour and UCI America Tour road bicycle racing events.

The company served as the premier title sponsor of the Jittery Joe’s Pro Cycling Team powered by Zero Gravity, which competes in road bicycle racing events throughout the United States and has raced internationally in Australia and South Africa. In 2008, after failing to secure a secondary sponsor, the team dropped from pro to amateur status.

== See also ==
- List of coffeehouse chains
