= Eindhoven Team Time Trial =

Dutch road cycling race

Race details
- Date: Late-June
- Region: Eindhoven, Netherlands
- English name: Eindhoven Team Time Trial
- Discipline: Road
- Competition: UCI ProTour
- Type: Team time-trial
- Web site: www.pro-tour.nl:80/default.asp

History
- First edition: 2005
- Editions: 3
- Final edition: 2007
- First winner: Gerolsteiner
- Most wins: Team CSC (2 wins)
- Final winner: Team CSC

The UCI ProTour Eindhoven Team Time Trial was an annual road bicycle race held in Eindhoven, Netherlands. It was approximately 50 kilometres (31 mi). Each team had six riders. In 2006, team size expanded to eight.

Conceived as part of the UCI ProTour in 2005, it was open to the 20 ProTour teams and 5 wildcard teams selected by the organisers. It was held immediately after the Ster Elektro Toer, a four-day race on the UCI Europe Tour.

In early 2008 Eindhoven ended involvement in the event. The UCI said it would be replaced by another to be decided. In 2012, the men's team time trial was introduced at the UCI Road World Championships.

== Winners ==
Year	Winning team	Country	Ranked Riders	Distance	Winning Time	Average Speed	Weather conditions
2005	Team Gerolsteiner	Germany	Markus Fothen, Sven Krauß, Sebastian Lang, Uwe Peschel, Michael Rich, Torsten Schmidt	48.6 km	53:35	54.414 km/h	Sunny
2006	Team CSC	Denmark	Lars Bak, Michael Blaudzun, Bobby Julich, Christian Müller, Stuart O'Grady, Brian Vandborg, Jens Voigt, David Zabriskie	48.6 km	52:28	55.578 km/h	Cloudy
2007	Team CSC	Denmark	Michael Blaudzun, Matthew Goss, Bobby Julich, Marcus Ljungqvist, Luke Roberts, Christian Vande Velde, David Zabriskie	48.6 km	53:36	54.39 km/h	Rain
