= Tour of Missouri =

Cycling race

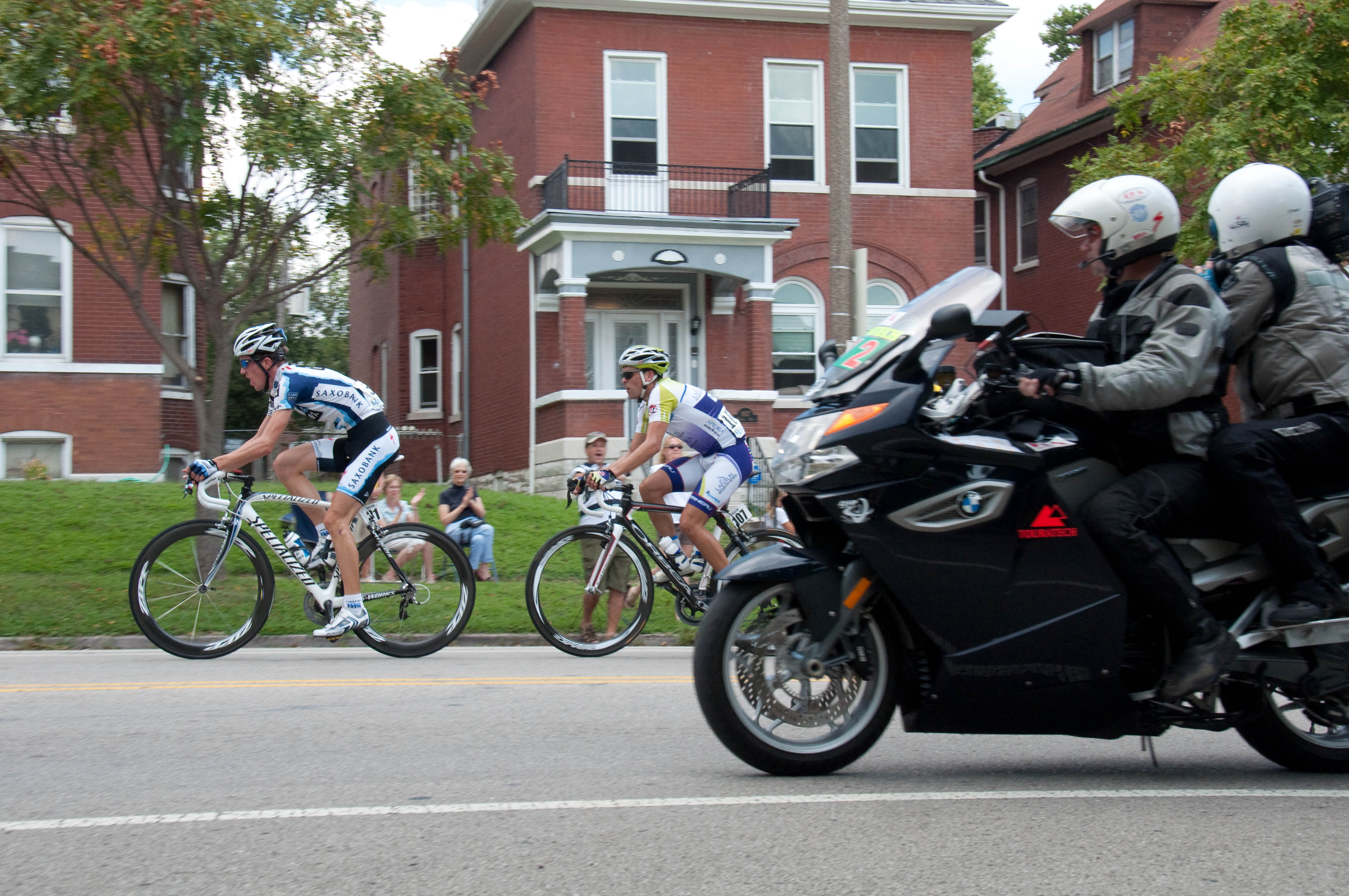

Race details
- Date: September
- Region: Missouri, United States
- Discipline: Road
- Competition: UCI America Tour 2.HC
- Type: Stage race
- Web site: www.tourofmissouri.com

History
- First edition: 2007
- Editions: 3 (as of 2009)
- Final edition: 2009
- First winner: George Hincapie (USA)
- Most wins: No repeat winners
- Final winner: David Zabriskie (USA)

The Tour of Missouri was a professional road bicycle racing stage race in Missouri that started on September 11, 2007 with six days of racing. The organizers, who also run the Tour de Georgia and the Amgen Tour of California, billed it as the third highest profile race in the United States.

The 2009 Tour of Missouri took place September 7–13, 2009 as part of 2008-2009 UCI America Tour and the 2009 USA Cycling Professional Tour. Missouri state officials intended to support the Tour for three years, with the intention of making it an annual event. However, the 2009 Tour was almost canceled when its funds were provisionally cut from the state's tourism budget. Funds were restored when breach-of-contract fees to teams threatened to total more than the $1.5 million that it would cost the state to finance the race.

== Jerseys of the Tour of Missouri ==
=== General classification ===
The current leader and overall winner by time after each stage and at the conclusion of the race is awarded the Yellow Jersey.

==== Winners ====
- 2007 : George Hincapie (USA), Discovery Channel
- 2008 : Christian Vande Velde (USA), Garmin–Chipotle p/b H30
- 2009 : Dave Zabriskie (USA), Garmin–Slipstream

=== Sprints classification ===
The Sprint Leader Jersey is a gray and Green Jersey is worn by the rider that receives the most bonus points awarded through his placing in intermediate sprints and finishing in the top 15 places at the end of the stage.

==== Winners ====
- 2007 : Ivan Dominguez (CUB), Toyota–United
- 2008 : Mark Cavendish (GBR), Team Columbia
- 2009 : Thor Hushovd (NOR), Cervélo TestTeam

=== Mountains classification ===
The King of the Mountains Jersey is worn by current leader and overall winner by points awarded by his placing in mountain climbs. The leader wears a medium-blue jersey with yellow accents and is sponsored by Michelob ULTRA.

==== Winners ====
- 2007 : Jeff Louder (USA), Health Net–Maxxis
- 2008 : Dominique Rollin (CAN), Toyota–United
- 2009 : Moisés Aldape (MEX), Team Type 1

=== Best Young Rider classification ===
The Best Young Rider is the best racer in General Classification that has less than 25 years old. He wears a White Jersey.

==== Winners ====
- 2007 : Steven Cozza (USA), Slipstream–Chipotle
- 2008 : Roman Kreuziger (CZE), Liquigas
- 2009 : Dario Cataldo (ITA), Quick-Step

=== Most Aggressive Rider classification ===
The Most Aggressive Rider wears the Red Jersey. The jersey is awarded at the end of each stage to the rider that demonstrates the most aggressive attacks, breakaways or strategies, as judged by a panel of media and race entourage officials.

==== Winners ====
- 2007 : Freddy Parra (MEX), Tecos de la Universidad de Guadalajara
- 2008 : Jeff Louder (USA), BMC Racing Team
- 2009 : Michael Barry (CAN), Team Columbia–HTC

=== Team classification ===
The Team classification winner represents the best overall time as a team and is calculated by recording the top three riders of each time for each stage.

==== Winners ====
- 2007 : Slipstream–Chipotle
- 2008 : Team Columbia
- 2009 : Team Saxo Bank
