= Cycling at the 2008 Summer Olympics – Men's individual road race =

Men's cycling road race at the Games of the XXIX Olympiad
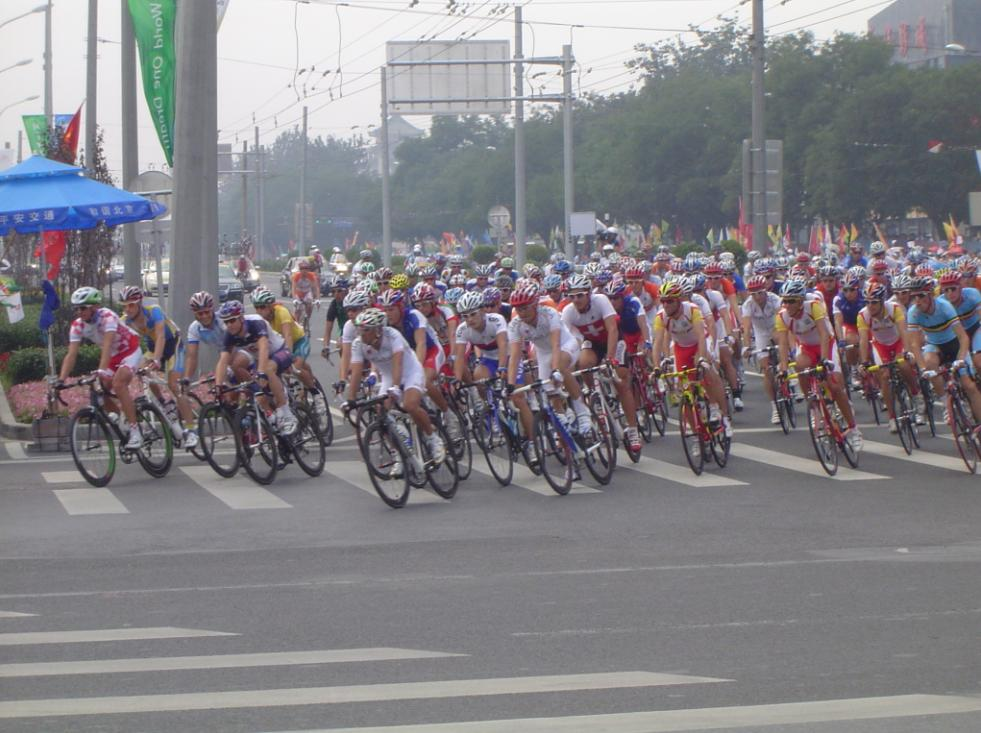
- The field shortly after the start.
- Venue: Urban Road Cycling Course; 245.4 km (152.5 mi)
- Date: August 9
- Competitors: 143 from 55 nations
- Winning time: 6:23:49; 38.36 km/h (23.84 mph)

Medalists
| 1st place, gold medalist(s) | | Samuel Sánchez; Spain |
| 2nd place, silver medalist(s) | | Fabian Cancellara; Switzerland |
| 3rd place, bronze medalist(s) | | Alexandr Kolobnev; Russia |

The men's road race, a part of the cycling events at the 2008 Summer Olympics, took place on August 9 at the Urban Road Cycling Course in Beijing. It started at 11:00 China Standard Time (UTC+8), and was scheduled to last until 17:30 later that day. The 245.4-kilometre (152.5 mi) course ran north across the heart of the Beijing metropolitan area, passing such landmarks as the Temple of Heaven, the Great Hall of the People, Tiananmen Square and the Beijing National Stadium. After rolling over relatively flat terrain for 78.8 km (49.0 mi) north of the Beijing city center, the route entered a decisive circuit encompassing seven loops on a 23.8 km (14.8 mi) section up and down the Badaling Pass, including ramps as steep as a 10 percent gradient.

The race was won by the Spanish rider Samuel Sánchez in 6 hours, 23 minutes, 49 seconds, after a six-man breakaway group contested a sprint finish. It was the first medal in the men's individual road race for Spain. Davide Rebellin of Italy and Fabian Cancellara of Switzerland, finishing second and third place with the same time as Sánchez, received silver and bronze medals respectively for the event. The hot and humid conditions were in sharp contrast to the heavy rain weathered in the women's road race the following day.

The event was one of the earliest to be concluded at the 2008 Summer Olympics, taking place on the first day of competition. Concerns were raised before the Olympics about the threat of pollution in endurance sports, but no major problems were apparent in the race.

In April 2009, it was announced that Rebellin had tested positive for Continuous erythropoietin receptor activator (CERA, a third-generation form of erythropoietin) during the Olympics. After his B-sample subsequently confirmed initial results, he returned his medal and repaid the prize money he had won from the Italian National Olympic Committee (CONI) while still maintaining his innocence. Cancellara and original fourth-place finisher Alexandr Kolobnev were later awarded new medals corresponding to their updated finishing positions. Kolobnev's bronze was Russia's first medal in the event.

== Qualification ==
Qualification for the race was restricted to five athletes per National Olympic Committee (NOC), providing that these athletes qualified through the Union Cycliste Internationale (UCI) rankings, with the UCI ProTour considered to be superior to the UCI Continental Circuits. The number of qualification places allocated varied among the different UCI tours, which all maintain their own ranking system. Any NOC unable to fill its quota of athletes from the ProTour was permitted to enter athletes from one of the continental tours, and if that was not feasible, from the "B" World Championship. The number of places allocated to each tour were thus (in descending order): 70 riders from the ProTour, 38 from the Europe tour, 15 from the America tour, nine from the Asia tour, five from the Africa tour, and three from the Oceania tour. Five entrants qualified through the "B" World Championships.

The final number of competitors was set to be 145, but only 143 athletes started the race. Four cyclists were scratched from the race shortly before it took place. Damiano Cunego of Italy had not yet recovered from the injuries he sustained in the 2008 Tour de France, so he was replaced by Vincenzo Nibali. Portugal's Sérgio Paulinho, the silver medalist at the 2004 event, was said to be in insufficient shape to race. After Russian Vladimir Gusev was fired by his professional team Astana for failing an internal doping check, he was replaced in this event by Denis Menchov, who later competed in the time trial. While training earlier in the week before the race, Switzerland's Michael Albasini crashed and broke his collarbone; there was not sufficient time to find a replacement for him.

== Preview ==
This was the 18th appearance of the event, previously held in 1896 and then at every Summer Olympics since 1936. It replaced the individual time trial event that had been held from 1912 to 1932; the time trial had been re-introduced in 1996 alongside the road race.

=== Pollution issues ===
Prior to the opening of the Games, the International Olympic Committee was keen to play down the risk that athletes faced from pollution; however, the organizing body considered rescheduling of endurance events (such as the cycling road race) if the pollution levels were too high. Athletes partaking in these events can consume 20 times the amount of oxygen as a sedentary person. A higher level of pollution in the air could adversely affect performance, damage or irritate an athlete's lungs, or exacerbate respiratory conditions, such as asthma.

Independent sources showed that pollution levels were above the limit deemed safe by the World Health Organization on August 9. However, the cycling event went ahead as scheduled with no objections from the athletes. Fifty-three of the 143 cyclists pulled out during the race; however, this is not unusual (over half withdrew mid-race at the 2004 Summer Olympics). Post-race, a number of riders highlighted the punishing conditions, in particular the heat (26 °C or 79 °F) and humidity (90%), which were much higher than in Europe, where the majority of UCI ProTour races are held. Pollution, however, was not widely cited as a problem, though Stefan Schumacher of Germany, who had been considered an outside favorite for victory in the event, said the elements and the pollution played a role in his withdrawal.

=== Pre-race favorites ===
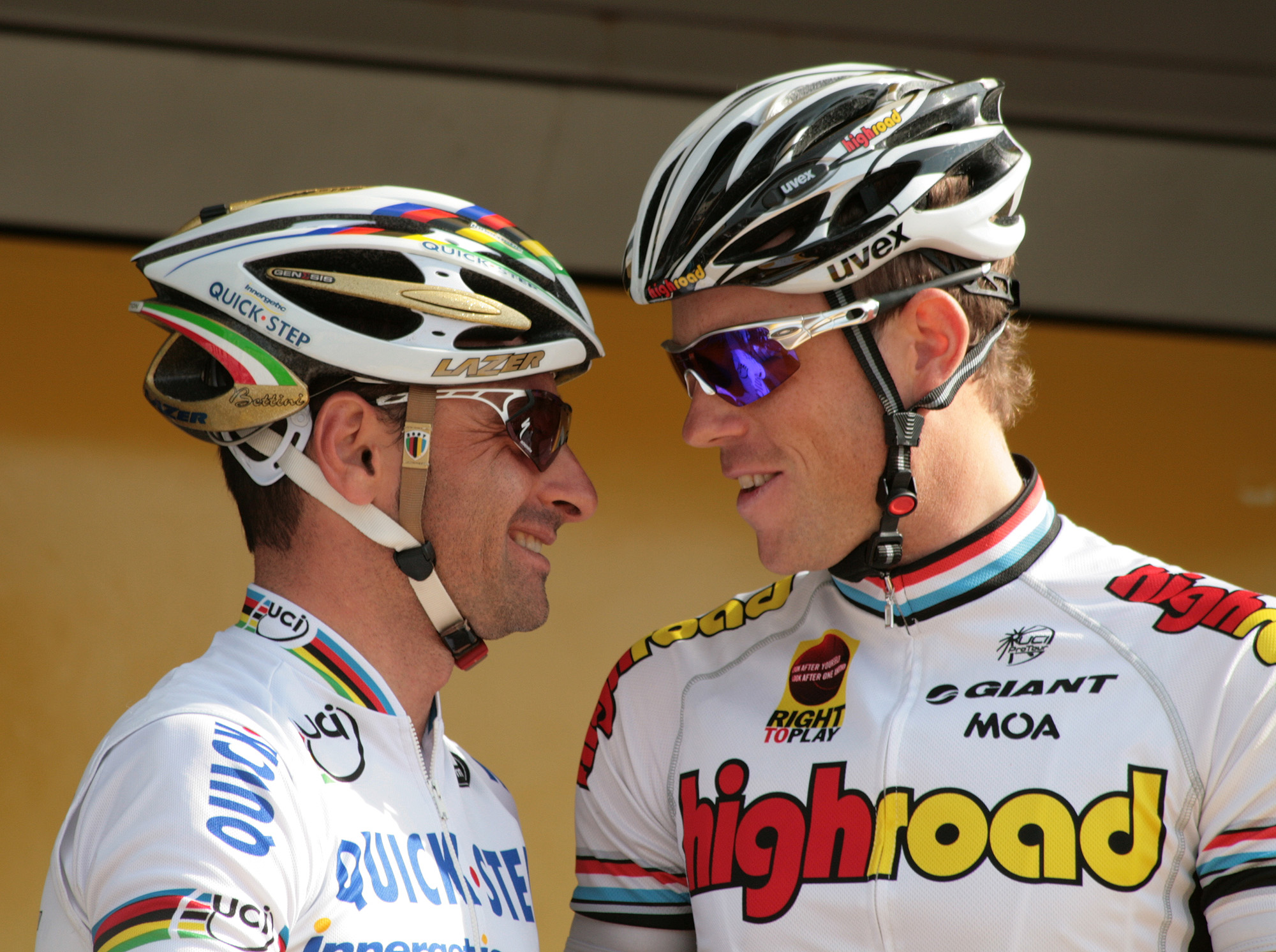
Paolo Bettini (left) and Kim Kirchen (right), rivals and pre-race favorites

Among the pre-race favorites was the entire Spanish contingent of riders. It included two winners of Grand Tours in Alberto Contador and Carlos Sastre, along with highly regarded countrymen Alejandro Valverde, winner of the 2008 Critérium du Dauphiné Libéré and the reigning Spanish national road race champion, and Samuel Sánchez, who had won three stages in the 2007 Vuelta a España. They also had 2008 Tour de France points classification winner and three-time world champion Óscar Freire available to work on their behalf. Valverde was seen as the strongest threat among the Spaniards. Other medal hopefuls included the defending Olympic champion Paolo Bettini of Italy, Germany's Stefan Schumacher, and Australian Cadel Evans, twice a runner-up in the Tour de France (2007 and 2008). It was thought that members of the overall strong squads from Germany and Luxembourg could also contend for victory. The German team contained Schumacher and many veterans of Grand Tours such as Jens Voigt to work in support, while Luxembourg had the Schleck brothers Andy and Fränk, along with Kim Kirchen, all of whom had worn leader's jerseys during the 2008 Tour de France.

== Course ==
The Urban Road Cycling Course (one of Beijing's nine temporary venues) was 102.6 km (63.8 mi) in its entirety, and the men's race was a distance of 245.4 km (152.5 mi), the longest in Olympic history. The race's starting line was located at the Yongdingmen, a reconstructed gate of Beijing's old city wall, which is a part of the Dongcheng District south of Beijing city center. The course ended at the Juyong Pass in the Changping District.

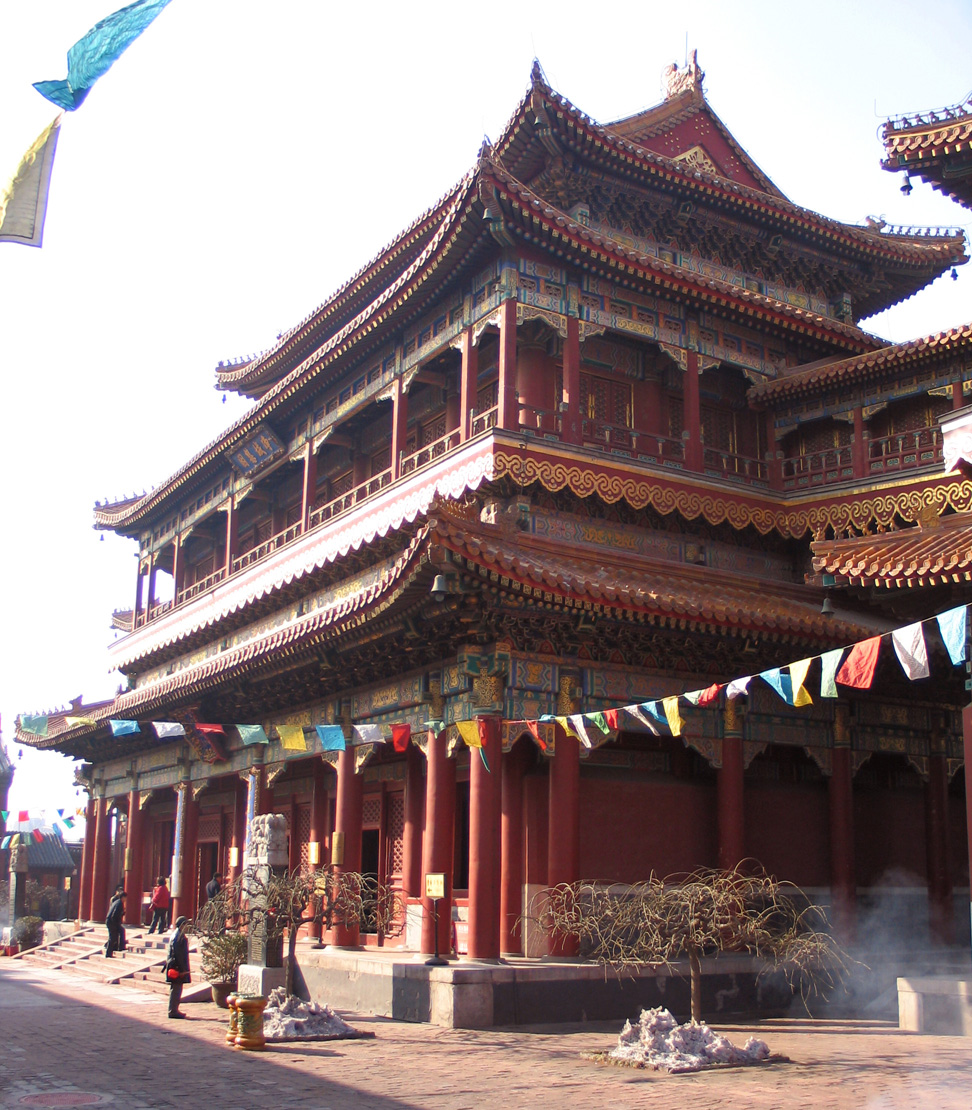
The Yonghe Temple

The route passed through a total of eight districts: Chongwen, Xuanwu, Dongcheng, Xicheng, Chaoyang, Haidian, Changping, and Yanqing. The course's scenery, described by The Guardian newspaper (UK) as "visually sumptuous", included landmarks such as the Temple of Heaven, the Great Hall of the People, Tiananmen Square, the Yonghe Temple, and sections of the Great Wall of China, which were passed through as the course journeyed from urban Beijing into the countryside. It also passed the architecture of the 2008 Olympics, including the Beijing National Stadium and Beijing National Aquatics Center (known colloquially as the "Bird's Nest" and "Water Cube").

The men's race layout, which differed most significantly from the women's in that it was over double its length, saw the riders make seven loops back-and-forth between the Badaling and Juyong Passes. The early sections of the race took place within central Beijing; consequently, the gradient of this part of the race was relatively flat. At approximately the 78.8 km (49.0 mi) point in the race the riders reached the Badaling section of the Great Wall, and began their first of seven 23.8 km (14.8 mi) loops. The riders encountered an increase in the gradient at this point, with the Badaling Pass gaining 338.2 metres (1,110 ft) in elevation over a distance of 12.4 km (7.7 mi) from the start of the circuit to the highest point. From there the cyclists rode over a false flat before descending a highway towards the Juyong Pass. The final 350 m (1,150 ft) of the race gave the riders a moderately steep climb to contend with, which was designed to ensure an exciting finale should several riders have been grouped together at the end of the race, as there were.

Due to security regulations put in place by the Olympic organizers, no spectators were permitted to stand roadside along the course. This decision proved to be controversial: several prominent figures in cycling, including UCI president Pat McQuaid and riders Stuart O'Grady and Cadel Evans (both Australia), spoke out against it. McQuaid and O'Grady both felt that the absence of people along the course deprived the race of the atmosphere present at other cycling events, and said that it failed to take supporters' wishes into consideration. Cycling Australia's reaction to the cyclists' complaints was to request that security restrictions be eased for the time trial to follow, but they were not.

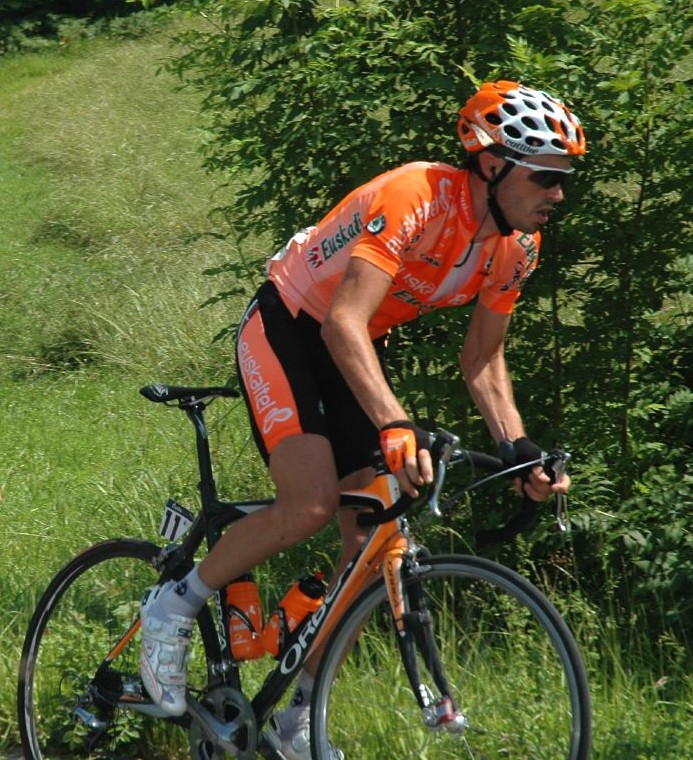
Samuel Sánchez, gold medalist

== Race ==
The men's road race began at 11:00 local time (UTC+8) and within 3 km (1.9 mi) of the start, Horacio Gallardo (Bolivia) and Patricio Almonacid (Chile) formed a two-man breakaway. They held a maximum advantage of 15 minutes, but were never really seen as a threat, and in fact neither went on to finish the race. With no single team willing to force the pace, a 26-man breakaway formed at the 60 km (37 mi) mark, including Carlos Sastre (Spain), Kim Kirchen (Luxembourg), Jens Voigt (Germany), Roman Kreuziger (Czech Republic) and Simon Gerrans (Australia). Shortly after the race reached the finish line to begin the first of seven 23.8 km (14.8 mi) loops, Gallardo was dropped by Almonacid. The lone Chilean leader was then caught by the now 24-man chase group at the summit on the second loop, after riding solo ahead of the pack for over an hour and a half.

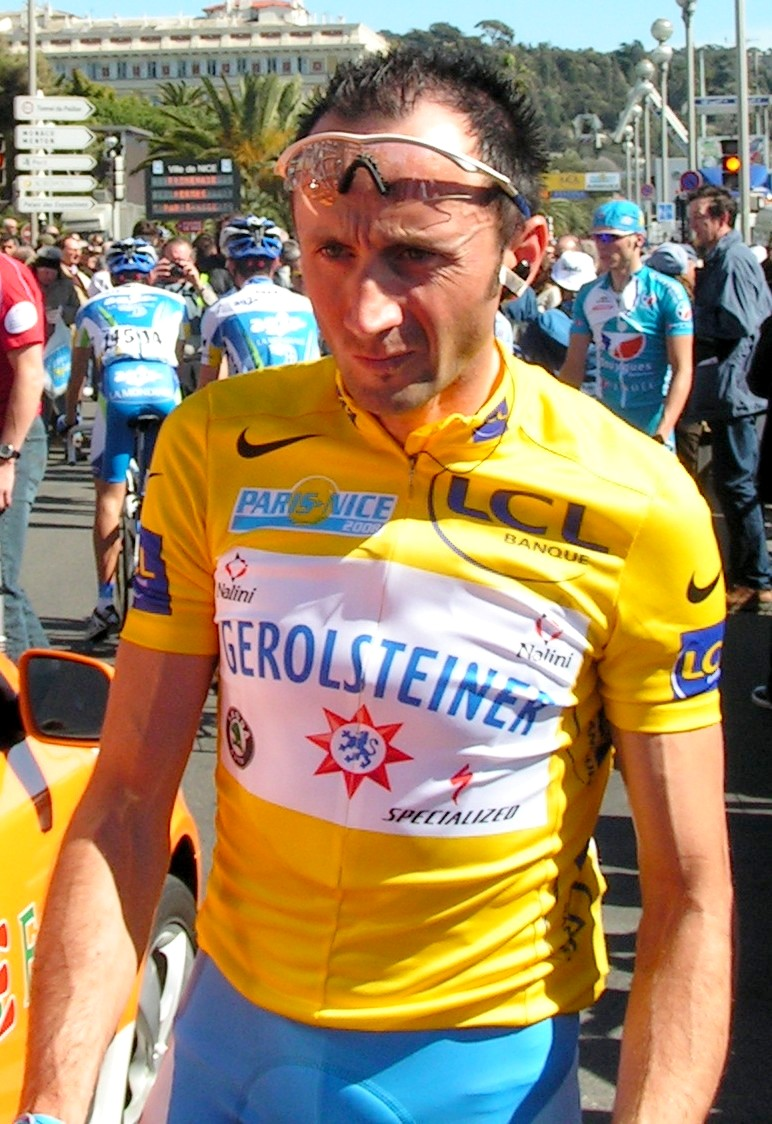
Davide Rebellin, silver medalist, later disqualified

Under the impetus of Sastre and Kreuziger in particular, the 24-strong breakaway group built their lead to over six minutes at the half-way point of the race, after four of the seven circuits. At that point, the Italian-paced main field increased its speed in order to bring them back. Aleksandr Kuschynski (Belarus) and Ruslan Pidgornyy (Ukraine) went clear of the leading group afterward and gained an advantage of a minute and 40 seconds over the Sastre group and 2 minutes, 45 seconds over the main field by the start of the fifth lap over the hilly circuit. The Sastre group was absorbed by the main field at the 60 km (37 mi) to go mark, leaving just Kuschynski and Pidgornyy out front. Not long after, shortly before the end of the fifth circuit, Marcus Ljungqvist (Sweden), Rigoberto Urán (Colombia) and Johan Van Summeren (Belgium) attacked from the peloton and reeled in Kuschynski and Pidgornyy.

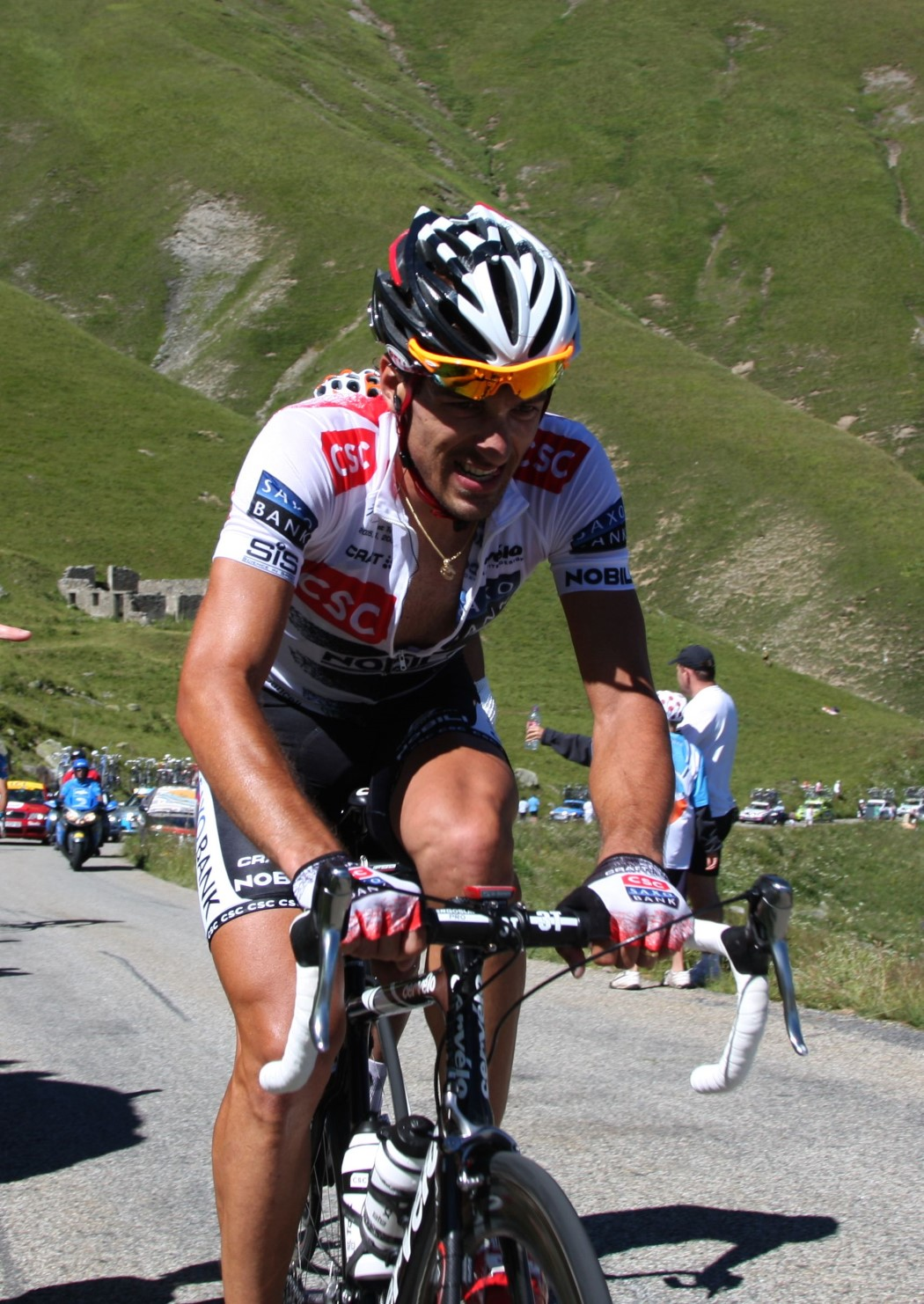
Fabian Cancellara, bronze medalist, later upgraded to silver

The next attack, one that would later be described as "audacious" and "brave", came from Christian Pfannberger (Austria), who went free of the main field toward the end of the sixth lap. His maximum advantage never grew to more than a minute, but he did stay away until well into the seventh and final lap, being caught with 20 km (12 mi) to go. Within five minutes of fierce attacks, fewer than 20 riders were left in the front group, a group that included Cadel Evans (Australia), Levi Leipheimer (United States), Santiago Botero (Colombia), and Jérôme Pineau (France), with Valverde and Bettini left behind them. Five riders, Samuel Sánchez (Spain), Michael Rogers (Australia), Davide Rebellin (Italy), Andy Schleck (Luxembourg), and Alexandr Kolobnev (Russia), came further clear from the group of now 13 due to repeated attacks from Schleck. Sánchez, Rebellin, and Schleck reached the summit of the Badaling climb, with 12.7 km (7.9 mi) to race, 10 seconds ahead of Rogers and Kolobnev, and 26 seconds ahead of the Evans group. Bettini, Valverde and Fabian Cancellara (Switzerland) attacked from the main peloton and joined the Evans group at the top of the climb. The leading group's advantage over the two-man chase was 15 seconds with 10 km (6.2 mi) to go.

With 5 km (3.1 mi) left, Cancellara attacked from the Evans group and caught up with the chasers that the group of three had left behind, Kolobnev and Rogers. The three of them successfully bridged the gap to the leaders with about 1 km (0.62 mi) to go, and there were six riders contesting the final sprint. Sánchez won the gold medal, Rebellin the silver, and Cancellara the bronze.

== Doping incident ==
In April 2009, the IOC announced that six athletes had tested positive during the 2008 Summer Olympics, without mentioning names or sports. Later, rumours emerged that the athletes included two cyclists, one of them a medal winner. The Italian National Olympic Committee (CONI) then confirmed that a male Italian cyclist had tested positive for Continuous erythropoietin receptor activator (CERA) during the men's road race, without identifying him. The next day, on 29 April 2009, the Committee confirmed that Davide Rebellin was an involved athlete. Rebellin's agent sent a request for the analysis of the B sample. On 8 July 2009, Rebellin, along with Stefan Schumacher, were confirmed as having tested positive. Schumacher was already serving a ban after testing positive in the 2008 Tour de France, but faced further punishment, and Rebellin subsequently had his medal removed by the UCI and the IOC. On 27 November, Rebellin returned his silver medal to CONI, per their and the UCI's request. Per UCI regulations, Cancellara and Kolobnev were moved up to second and third in the official results, but did not initially receive new medals. On December 18, 2010, Cancellara received the same physical medal initially given to Rebellin, in a ceremony held in his hometown of Ittigen, Switzerland. The medal originally given to Cancellara will in turn be given to Kolobnev.

Rebellin had appealed at the Court of Arbitration for Sport (CAS) against the decision to remove his silver medal, but in July 2010, this was rejected.

There had been controversy in the months before the men's road race when, in the aftermath of doping revelations at the Tour de France, International Olympic Committee vice-president Thomas Bach had suggested that the men's road race's place in the Olympics should be reconsidered, and said that the credibility of the sport had been damaged; although he clarified that there was no immediate threat. Pat McQuaid had reacted angrily to these comments, saying, "Why should they [the majority of cyclists] be threatened because of a few bad apples?"

== Final classification ==
A total of 142 riders have been qualified in the event at these Games. Most of them are not expected to finish one-day races, having worked in support for their teams (in this case, nations) to place their riders with better climbing skills in good positions once the mountainous part of a course begins. Many of these riders also sought to conserve themselves for the time trial that was to come. Additionally, if a rider was lapped by the race leader on the Badaling circuit, he would be forced to stop.

The notation "s.t." indicates that the rider crossed the finish line in the same group as the one receiving the time above him, and was therefore credited with the same finishing time.
Source: Official results

| Rank | Cyclist | Nation | Time |
|---|---|---|---|
| 1st place, gold medalist(s) | Samuel Sánchez | Spain | 6:23:49 |
| 2nd place, silver medalist(s) | Fabian Cancellara | Switzerland | s.t. |
| 3rd place, bronze medalist(s) | Alexandr Kolobnev | Russia | s.t. |
| 4 | Andy Schleck | Luxembourg | s.t. |
| 5 | Michael Rogers | Australia | s.t. |
| 6 | Santiago Botero | Colombia | 6:24:01 |
| 7 | Mario Aerts | Belgium | s.t. |
| 8 | Michael Barry | Canada | 6:24:05 |
| 9 | Robert Gesink | Netherlands | 6:24:07 |
| 10 | Levi Leipheimer | United States | 6:24:09 |
| 11 | Chris Anker Sørensen | Denmark | 6:24:11 |
| 12 | Alejandro Valverde | Spain | s.t. |
| 13 | Jérôme Pineau | France | s.t. |
| 14 | Cadel Evans | Australia | s.t. |
| 15 | Przemysław Niemiec | Poland | s.t. |
| 16 | Christian Vande Velde | United States | 6:24:19 |
| 17 | Paolo Bettini | Italy | 6:24:24 |
| 18 | Vladimir Karpets | Russia | 6:24:59 |
| 19 | Murilo Fischer | Brazil | 6:26:17 |
| 20 | Fabian Wegmann | Germany | s.t. |
| 21 | Erik Hoffmann | Namibia | s.t. |
| 22 | Christian Pfannberger | Austria | s.t. |
| 23 | Gustav Larsson | Sweden | s.t. |
| 24 | Nicki Sørensen | Denmark | s.t. |
| 25 | Radoslav Rogina | Croatia | s.t. |
| 26 | John-Lee Augustyn | South Africa | s.t. |
| 27 | Nuno Ribeiro | Portugal | s.t. |
| 28 | Ignatas Konovalovas | Lithuania | s.t. |
| 29 | Jackson Rodríguez | Venezuela | s.t. |
| 30 | Matthew Lloyd | Australia | s.t. |
| 31 | Kurt Asle Arvesen | Norway | s.t. |
| 32 | Kanstantsin Sivtsov | Belarus | s.t. |
| 33 | Rémi Pauriol | France | s.t. |
| 34 | Tadej Valjavec | Slovenia | s.t. |
| 35 | Yaroslav Popovych | Ukraine | s.t. |
| 36 | Simon Gerrans | Australia | s.t. |
| 37 | Thomas Lövkvist | Sweden | 6:26:25 |
| 38 | Thomas Rohregger | Austria | s.t. |
| 39 | George Hincapie | United States | s.t. |
| 40 | José Serpa | Colombia | 6:26:27 |
| 41 | Johan Vansummeren | Belgium | s.t. |
| 42 | Fränk Schleck | Luxembourg | s.t. |
| 43 | Andrey Mizurov | Kazakhstan | s.t. |
| 44 | Roman Kreuziger | Czech Republic | 6:26:35 |
| 45 | Kim Kirchen | Luxembourg | 6:26:40 |
| 46 | Moisés Aldape | Mexico | 6:28:08 |
| 47 | Rein Taaramäe | Estonia | 6:30:49 |
| 48 | Carlos Sastre | Spain | 6:31:06 |
| 49 | Franco Pellizotti | Italy | s.t. |
| 50 | Sergey Lagutin | Uzbekistan | s.t. |
| 51 | Hossein Askari | Iran | 6:34:22 |
| 52 | Ruslan Pidgornyy | Ukraine | s.t. |
| 53 | Julian Dean | New Zealand | 6:34:26 |
| 54 | Jacek Tadeusz Morajko | Poland | s.t. |
| 55 | Ryder Hesjedal | Canada | s.t. |
| 56 | Matija Kvasina | Croatia | s.t. |
| 57 | Marcus Ljungqvist | Sweden | s.t. |
| 58 | Svein Tuft | Canada | s.t. |
| 59 | Denis Menchov | Russia | s.t. |
| 60 | Jure Golčer | Slovenia | s.t. |
| 61 | Ján Valach | Slovakia | s.t. |
| 62 | Marzio Bruseghin | Italy | s.t. |
| 63 | Nicolas Roche | Ireland | s.t. |
| 64 | Laurens ten Dam | Netherlands | s.t. |
| 65 | Péter Kusztor | Hungary | 6:35:44 |
| 66 | Ivan Stević | Serbia | s.t. |
| 67 | Gatis Smukulis | Latvia | 6:36:48 |
| 68 | Tanel Kangert | Estonia | s.t. |
| 69 | Gonzalo Garrido | Chile | s.t. |
| 70 | Edvald Boasson Hagen | Norway | s.t. |
| 71 | André Cardoso | Portugal | 6:39:42 |
| 72 | Aleksandr Kuschynski | Belarus | s.t. |
| 73 | Dainius Kairelis | Lithuania | s.t. |
| 74 | Petr Benčík | Czech Republic | s.t. |
| 75 | Alexandre Pliuschin | Moldova | s.t. |
| 76 | Denys Kostyuk | Ukraine | s.t. |
| 77 | Sergey Ivanov | Russia | s.t. |
| 78 | Ghader Mizbani | Iran | s.t. |
| 79 | David George | South Africa | s.t. |
| 80 | Philip Deignan | Ireland | s.t. |
| 81 | Glen Chadwick | New Zealand | s.t. |
| 82 | Aliaksandr Usau | Belarus | 6:49:59 |
| 83 | Tomasz Marczyński | Poland | s.t. |
| 84 | Nebojša Jovanović | Serbia | s.t. |
| 85 | Takashi Miyazawa | Japan | 6:55:24 |
| 86 | Rafâa Chtioui | Tunisia | 7:03:04 |
| 87 | Park Sung-Baek | South Korea | s.t. |
| 88 | Wu Kin San | Hong Kong | 7:05:57 |
| 89 | Luciano Pagliarini | Brazil | 7:08:27 |
| − | Alberto Contador | Spain (Note: Fatigue.) | DNF |
| − | Simon Špilak | Slovenia (Note: Crash with Miholjević.) | DNF |
| − | Jens Voigt | Germany (Note: Heat/pollution-related fatigue.) | DNF |
| − | Pierrick Fédrigo | France | DNF |
| − | Cyril Dessel | France | DNF |
| − | Pierre Rolland | France | DNF |
| − | Rigoberto Urán | Colombia | DNF |
| − | Ben Swift | Great Britain (Note: Heat-related fatigue.) | DNF |
| − | Stef Clement | Netherlands | DNF |
| − | Bert Grabsch | Germany | DNF |
| − | Vincenzo Nibali | Italy | DNF |
| − | Lars Petter Nordhaug | Norway | DNF |
| − | Vladimir Miholjević | Croatia (Note: Crash with Špilak.) | DNF |
| − | Christophe Brandt | Belgium | DNF |
| − | Stefan Schumacher | Germany | DNF |
| − | Brian Vandborg | Denmark | DNF |
| − | Jurgen van den Broeck | Belgium | DNF |
| − | Timothy Gudsell | New Zealand (Note: Fatigue.) | DNF |
| − | Patricio Almonacid | Chile | DNF |
| − | Evgeniy Gerganov | Bulgaria | DNF |
| − | Borut Božič | Slovenia | DNF |
| − | Stuart O'Grady | Australia (Note: Headache.) | DNF |
| − | Maxim Iglinsky | Kazakhstan | DNF |
| − | Gabriel Rasch | Norway | DNF |
| − | Fumiyuki Beppu | Japan | DNF |
| − | Henry Raabe | Costa Rica (Note: Lapped and disqualified.) | DNF |
| − | Mehdi Sohrabi | Iran (Note: Lapped and disqualified.) | DNF |
| − | Mario Contreras | El Salvador | DNF |
| − | Andriy Hryvko | Ukraine (Note: Heat-related fatigue.) | DNF |
| − | Vladimir Efimkin | Russia | DNF |
| − | Jason McCartney | United States | DNF |
| − | Roger Hammond | Great Britain | DNF |
| − | Karsten Kroon | Netherlands (Note: Heat-related fatigue.) | DNF |
| − | Óscar Freire | Spain (Note: Stomach disease.) | DNF |
| − | Steve Cummings | Great Britain (Note: Fatigue and time trial preparation.) | DNF |
| − | Maxime Monfort | Belgium | DNF |
| − | Matej Jurčo | Slovakia (Note: Heat-related fatigue.) | DNF |
| − | Roman Broniš | Slovakia | DNF |
| − | Hichem Chabane | Algeria (Note: Lapped and disqualified.) | DNF |
| − | Juan José Haedo | Argentina (Note: Breathing problems.) | DNF |
| − | Zhang Liang | China (Note: Lapped and disqualified.) | DNF |
| − | Ahmed Belgasem | Libya | DNF |
| − | Gerald Ciolek | Germany (Note: Heat-related fatigue.) | DNF |
| − | Raivis Belohvoščiks | Latvia | DNF |
| − | Jonathan Bellis | Great Britain (Note: Breathing problems.) | DNF |
| − | Horacio Gallardo | Bolivia | DNF |
| − | László Bodrogi | Hungary (Note: Time trial preparation.) | DNF |
| − | Daniel Petrov | Bulgaria (Note: Lapped and disqualified.) | DNF |
| − | Matías Médici | Argentina | DNF |
| − | Niki Terpstra | Netherlands (Note: Mechanical problems and fatigue.) | DNF |
| − | Alejandro Borrajo | Argentina (Note: Lapped and disqualified.) | DNF |
| − | Robert Hunter | South Africa (Note: Lapped and disqualified.) | DNF |
| − | David Zabriskie | United States (Note: Time trial preparation.) | DNF |
| − | Davide Rebellin | Italy | DSQ |
