= 2008 Tour of Missouri =

UCI America Tour

Race details
- Dates: September 8–September 14
- Stages: 7
- Distance: 601.2 mi (967.5 km)
- Winning time: 21h 23' 26"

Results
Jersey awarded to the overall winner	Winner	Christian Vande Velde (USA)	(Team Garmin–Chipotle)
	Second	Michael Rogers (AUS)	(Team Columbia)
	Third	Svein Tuft (CAN)	(Symmetrics Cycling Team)
Jersey awarded to the points classification winner	Points	Mark Cavendish (GBR)	(Team Columbia)
Jersey awarded to the mountains classification winner	Mountains	Dominique Rollin (CAN)	(Toyota–United)
Jersey awarded to the youth classification winner	Youth	Roman Kreuziger (CZE)	(Team Liquigas)
	Team	(United States) Team Columbia	

The 2008 Tour of Missouri was the second annual edition of a professional road bicycle racing stage race held in Missouri. It began on September 8, 2008, with seven days of racing. Run by same organizers as the Tour de Georgia and the Amgen Tour of California, the Tour of Missouri is being billed as the third highest profile domestic race in the United States. The race was broadcast on Universal Sports, a network being carried on the digital subchannels of twenty-one television stations throughout the country.

== Stage ==
=== Stage 1 ===
8 September 2008 — Saint Joseph to Kansas City, 90 mi (145 km)

Stage 1 Results

	Cyclist	Team	Time
1	Mark Cavendish (GBR)	Team Columbia	3h 15' 14"
2	Tyler Farrar (USA)	Garmin–Chipotle p/b H30	s.t.
3	Francesco Chicchi (ITA)	Liquigas	s.t.

General Classification after Stage 1

	Cyclist	Team	Time
1	Mark Cavendish (GBR)	Team Columbia	3h 15' 14"
2	Tyler Farrar (USA)	Garmin–Chipotle p/b H30	+ 4"
3	Martin Kohler (SUI)	BMC Racing Team	+ 5"

=== Stage 2 ===
9 September 2008 — Clinton to Springfield, 125 mi (201 km)

Stage 2 Results

	Cyclist	Team	Time
1	Mark Cavendish (GBR)	Team Columbia	4h 53' 19"
2	Eric Baumann (GER)	Team Sparkasse	s.t.
3	Francesco Chicchi (ITA)	Liquigas	s.t.

General Classification after Stage 2

	Cyclist	Team	Time
1	Mark Cavendish (GBR)	Team Columbia	8h 08' 13"
2	Francesco Chicchi (ITA)	Liquigas	+ 12"
3	Eric Baumann (GER)	Team Sparkasse	+ 14"

=== Stage 3 ===
10 September 2008 — Branson, 18 mi (29 km) (Individual Time Trial)

Stage 3 Results

	Cyclist	Team	Time
1	Christian Vande Velde (USA)	Garmin–Chipotle p/b H30	39' 51"
2	Michael Rogers (AUS)	Team Columbia	+ 21"
3	Svein Tuft (CAN)	Symmetrics Cycling Team	+ 33"

General Classification after Stage 3

	Cyclist	Team	Time
1	Christian Vande Velde (USA)	Garmin–Chipotle p/b H30	8h 48' 24"
2	Michael Rogers (AUS)	Team Columbia	+ 21"
3	Svein Tuft (CAN)	Symmetrics Cycling Team	+ 44"

=== Stage 4 ===
11 September 2008 — Lebanon to Rolla, 105 mi (169 km)

Stage 4 Results

	Cyclist	Team	Time
1	Michael Barry (CAN)	Team Columbia	3h 16' 06"
2	Eric Baumann (GER)	Team Sparkasse	+ 46"
3	Danilo Wyss (SUI)	BMC Racing Team	s.t.

General Classification after Stage 4

	Cyclist	Team	Time
1	Christian Vande Velde (USA)	Garmin–Chipotle p/b H30	12h 05' 13"
2	Michael Rogers (AUS)	Team Columbia	+ 18"
3	Svein Tuft (CAN)	Symmetrics Cycling Team	+ 43"

=== Stage 5 ===
12 September 2008 — St. James to Jefferson City, 100 mi (161 km)

Stage 5 Results

	Cyclist	Team	Time
1	Boy van Poppel (NED)	Rabobank	3h 48' 42"
2	Michael Van Stayen (BEL)	Rabobank	s.t.
3	Kevin Lacombe (CAN)	Kelly Benefit – Medifast	s.t.

General Classification after Stage 5

	Cyclist	Team	Time
1	Christian Vande Velde (USA)	Garmin–Chipotle p/b H30	15h 53' 55"
2	Michael Rogers (AUS)	Team Columbia	+ 18"
3	Svein Tuft (CAN)	Symmetrics Cycling Team	+ 48"

=== Stage 6 ===
13 September 2008 — Hermann to St. Charles, 110.5 mi (178 km)

Stage 6 Results

	Cyclist	Team	Time
1	Mark Cavendish (GBR)	Team Columbia	3h 32' 25"
2	Iván Domínguez (CUB)	Toyota–United	s.t.
3	Brad Huff (USA)	Jelly Belly Cycling Team	s.t.

General Classification after Stage 6

	Cyclist	Team	Time
1	Christian Vande Velde (USA)	Garmin–Chipotle p/b H30	19h 26' 20"
2	Michael Rogers (AUS)	Team Columbia	+ 18"
3	Svein Tuft (CAN)	Symmetrics Cycling Team	+ 48"

=== Stage 7 ===
14 September 2008 — St. Louis, 53.2 mi (86 km)

Stage 7 Results

	Cyclist	Team	Time
1	Francesco Chicchi (ITA)	Liquigas	1h 57' 06"
2	Mark Cavendish (GBR)	Team Columbia	s.t.
3	Tyler Farrar (USA)	Garmin–Chipotle p/b H30	s.t.

General Classification after Stage 7

	Cyclist	Team	Time
1	Christian Vande Velde (USA)	Garmin–Chipotle p/b H30	21h 23' 26"
2	Michael Rogers (AUS)	Team Columbia	+ 18"
3	Svein Tuft (CAN)	Symmetrics Cycling Team	+ 48"

== Jersey progress ==
Stage (Winner)	General Classification	Young Classification	Mountains Classification	Sprint Classification	Aggressive Rider	Team Classification
Stage 1 (Mark Cavendish)	Mark Cavendish	Mark Cavendish	Dominique Rollin	Mark Cavendish	Martin Kohler	Team Columbia
Stage 2 (Mark Cavendish)	Mark Cavendish	Mark Cavendish	Dominique Rollin	Mark Cavendish	Andy Guptill	Garmin–Chipotle p/b H30
Stage 3 (Christian Vande Velde)	Christian Vande Velde	Steven Cozza	Dominique Rollin	Mark Cavendish		Garmin–Chipotle p/b H30
Stage 4 (Michael Barry)	Christian Vande Velde	Roman Kreuziger	Dominique Rollin	Eric Baumann	Michael Barry	Team Columbia
Stage 5 (Boy van Poppel)	Christian Vande Velde	Roman Kreuziger	Dominique Rollin	Mark Cavendish	David Veilleux	Team Columbia
Stage 6 (Mark Cavendish)	Christian Vande Velde	Roman Kreuziger	Dominique Rollin	Mark Cavendish		Team Columbia
Stage 7 (Francesco Chicchi)	Christian Vande Velde	Roman Kreuziger	Dominique Rollin	Mark Cavendish		Team Columbia
Final	Christian Vande Velde	Roman Kreuziger	Dominique Rollin	Mark Cavendish	Jeff Louder	Team Columbia

== Participating teams ==
UCI ProTour Teams

- LIQ – (Italy) Team Liquigas
- THR – (United States) Team Columbia

UCI Professional Continental Teams

- BMC – (United States) BMC Racing Team
- TSL – (United States) Garmin–Chipotle presented by H30

UCI Continental Teams—America Tour

- BPC – (United States) Bissell Pro Cycling Team
- COL – (United States) Colovita Sutter Home presented by Cooking Light
- HNM – (United States) Health Net Pro Cycling Team Presented by Maxxis
- JBC – (United States) Jelly Belly Cycling Team
- KBM – (United States) Kelly Benefit Strategies / Medifast
- RRC – (United States) Rock Racing
- SYM – (Canada) Symmetrics Cycling Team
- TUA – (Mexico) Tecos de la Universidad de Guadalajara
- TUP – (United States) Toyota–United Pro Cycling Team

UCI Continental Team—Europe Tour

- RB3 – (Netherlands) Rabobank
- TSP – (Germany) Team Sparkasse
