= 2009 Tour of Missouri =

UCI America Tour

Race details
- Dates: September 7–13
- Stages: 7
- Distance: 612.5 mi (985.7 km)
- Winning time: 22h 26' 56"

Results
Jersey awarded to the overall winner	Winner	David Zabriskie (USA)	(Garmin–Slipstream)
	Second	Gustav Larsson (SWE)	(Team Saxo Bank)
	Third	Marco Pinotti (ITA)	(Team Columbia–HTC)
Jersey awarded to the points classification winner	Points	Thor Hushovd (NOR)	(Cervélo TestTeam)
Jersey awarded to the mountains classification winner	Mountains	Moisés Aldape (MEX)	(Team Type 1)
Jersey awarded to the youth classification winner	Youth	Dario Cataldo (ITA)	(Quick-Step)
	Team	Team Saxo Bank	

The 2009 Tour of Missouri was the third annual edition of a professional road bicycle racing stage race held in Missouri. It began on September 7, 2009 with seven days of racing. The Tour of Missouri is considered the second highest profile domestic race in the United States this year, bettered only by the Tour of California. Television coverage of the race will be limited to daily 30 minute recorded highlights on Versus, and some local TV station coverage. Live streaming of the race will be available for all stages online via the Official Tour of Missouri web site Tour Tracker and the Universal Sports web site.

== Teams ==
UCI ProTour Teams

- AST - Astana
- GRM - Garmin–Slipstream
- LIQ - Liquigas
- QST - Quick-Step
- SAX - Team Saxo Bank
- THR - Team Columbia–HTC

UCI Professional Continental Teams

- BMC - BMC Racing Team
- CTT - Cervélo TestTeam

UCI Continental Teams

- BPC - Bissell
- COL - Colavita–Sutter Home
- JBC - Jelly Belly Cycling Team
- KBS - Kelly Benefit Strategies
- OCM - OUCH–Maxxis
- TRP - Planet Energy
- TT1 - Team Type 1

== Stages ==
=== Stage 1 ===
September 7, St. Louis Circuit Race - 75 mi (121 km)
Numerous attacks were launched on the 7.5 mile circuit, but only the trio of Tomas Vaitkus, Chris Anker Sørensen, and Moisés Aldape were able to stay away for any significant amount of time, picking up the majority of bonus seconds for the stage. Team Columbia–HTC kept close tabs on the break, keen to lead out sprinter Mark Cavendish. Thor Hushovd launched the sprint with a broken wheel, sustained just before the sprint, but was passed by Cavendish and Juan José Haedo.

Stage 1 Results

	Cyclist	Team	Time
1	Mark Cavendish (GBR)	Team Columbia–HTC	2h 43' 56"
2	Juan José Haedo (ARG)	Team Saxo Bank	s.t.
3	Thor Hushovd (NOR)	Cervélo TestTeam	s.t.
4	Francesco Chicchi (ITA)	Liquigas	s.t.
5	Martin Gilbert (CAN)	Planet Energy	s.t.
6	Lucas Sebastian Haedo (ARG)	Colavita–Sutter Home	s.t.
7	Antonio Cruz (USA)	BMC Racing Team	s.t.
8	Alex Candelario (USA)	Kelly Benefit Strategies	s.t.
9	John Murphy (USA)	OUCH–Maxxis	s.t.
10	Mike Friedman (USA)	Garmin–Slipstream	s.t.

General Classification after Stage 1

	Cyclist	Team	Time
1	Mark Cavendish (GBR)	Team Columbia–HTC	2h 43' 56"
2	Moisés Aldape (MEX)	Team Type 1	+ 2"
3	Juan José Haedo (ARG)	Team Saxo Bank	+ 4"
4	Tomas Vaitkus (LTU)	Astana	+ 4"
5	Thor Hushovd (NOR)	Cervélo TestTeam	+ 6"
6	Chris Anker Sørensen (DEN)	Team Saxo Bank	+ 6"
7	Francesco Chicchi (ITA)	Liquigas	+ 10"
8	Martin Gilbert (CAN)	Planet Energy	+ 10"
9	Lucas Sebastian Haedo (ARG)	Colavita–Sutter Home	+ 10"
10	Antonio Cruz (USA)	BMC Racing Team	+ 10"

=== Stage 2 ===
September 8, Ste. Genevieve - Cape Girardeau, 112.4 mi (180.9 km)
Timmy Duggan, Kiel Reijnen and François Parisien were able to form the day's main breakaway at 57 kilometers, but Team Columbia–HTC and Team Saxo Bank reeled them in on behalf of their sprinters. Mark Cavendish was once again able to get on Thor Hushovd's wheel, and took his second win in as many days.

Stage 2 Results

	Cyclist	Team	Time
1	Mark Cavendish (GBR)	Team Columbia–HTC	4h 16' 53"
2	Thor Hushovd (NOR)	Cervélo TestTeam	s.t.
3	Juan José Haedo (ARG)	Team Saxo Bank	s.t.
4	Brett Lancaster (AUS)	Cervélo TestTeam	s.t.
5	Martin Gilbert (CAN)	Planet Energy	s.t.
6	Alex Candelario (USA)	Kelly Benefit Strategies	s.t.
7	Davide Malacarne (ITA)	Quick-Step	s.t.
8	Antonio Cruz (USA)	BMC Racing Team	s.t.
9	Guillaume Boivin (CAN)	Planet Energy	s.t.
10	Daniel Oss (ITA)	Liquigas	s.t.

General Classification after Stage 2

	Cyclist	Team	Time
1	Mark Cavendish (GBR)	Team Columbia–HTC	7h 00' 29"
2	Thor Hushovd (NOR)	Cervélo TestTeam	+ 10"
3	Juan José Haedo (ARG)	Team Saxo Bank	+ 10"
4	Moisés Aldape (MEX)	Team Type 1	+ 12"
5	Tomas Vaitkus (LTU)	Astana	+ 14"
6	Chris Anker Sørensen (DEN)	Team Saxo Bank	+ 16"
7	Timmy Duggan (USA)	Garmin–Slipstream	+ 17"
8	Michael Rogers (AUS)	Team Columbia–HTC	+ 17"
9	Lars Bak (DEN)	Team Saxo Bank	+ 18"
10	Kiel Reijnen (USA)	Jelly Belly Cycling Team	+ 10"

=== Stage 3 ===
September 9, Farmington - Rolla, 114.3 mi (183.9 km)

Stage 3 Results

	Cyclist	Team	Time
1	Thor Hushovd (NOR)	Cervélo TestTeam	4h 26' 50"
2	Juan José Haedo (ARG)	Team Saxo Bank	s.t.
3	Dario Cataldo (ITA)	Quick-Step	s.t.
4	Daniel Oss (ITA)	Liquigas	s.t.
5	Mark Cavendish (GBR)	Team Columbia–HTC	s.t.
6	John Murphy (USA)	OUCH–Maxxis	s.t.
7	Lucas Sebastian Haedo (ARG)	Colavita–Sutter Home	s.t.
8	David Veilleux (CAN)	Kelly Benefit Strategies	s.t.
9	Andrew Pinfold (CAN)	OUCH–Maxxis	s.t.
10	Antonio Cruz (USA)	BMC Racing Team	s.t.

General Classification after Stage 3

	Cyclist	Team	Time
1	Thor Hushovd (NOR)	Cervélo TestTeam	11h 27' 19"
2	Mark Cavendish (GBR)	Team Columbia–HTC	+ 0"
3	Juan José Haedo (ARG)	Team Saxo Bank	+ 4"
4	Moisés Aldape (MEX)	Team Type 1	+ 12"
5	Tomas Vaitkus (LTU)	Astana	+ 14"
6	Mike Friedman (USA)	Garmin–Slipstream	+ 14"
7	Dario Cataldo (ITA)	Quick-Step	+ 16"
8	Chris Anker Sørensen (DEN)	Team Saxo Bank	+ 16"
9	Michael Rogers (AUS)	Team Columbia–HTC	+ 17"
10	Timmy Duggan (USA)	Garmin–Slipstream	+ 17"

=== Stage 4 ===
September 10, St. James - Jefferson City, 109.2 mi (175.7 km)
Mark Cavendish, the winner of the first two stages, did not start stage 4 due to respiratory illness.
Another day-long breakaway was formed containing Bernard Van Ulden, Jeff Louder, Bradley White and Michael Creed. The Cervélo TestTeam and Garmin–Slipstream led peloton never let them get much more than three minutes advantage. They were finally caught just before the finishing circuit, a three lap circuit containing the "Capital wall". Multiple attacks were launched on the steep hill, but none succeeded. There was a large crash in the back of the field, claiming George Hincapie and the stage winner's brother, Lucas Sebastian Haedo. Juan José Haedo was able to outsprint yellow and green jersey holder Thor Hushovd to take the stage win and the yellow jersey.

Stage 4 Results

	Cyclist	Team	Time
1	Juan José Haedo (ARG)	Team Saxo Bank	4h 07' 55"
2	Thor Hushovd (NOR)	Cervélo TestTeam	s.t.
3	Dario Cataldo (ITA)	Quick-Step	s.t.
4	Daniel Oss (ITA)	Liquigas	s.t.
5	Kyle Wamsley (USA)	Colavita–Sutter Home	s.t.
6	Bernhard Eisel (AUT)	Team Columbia–HTC	s.t.
7	Kevin Lacombe (CAN)	Planet Energy	s.t.
8	Antonio Cruz (USA)	BMC Racing Team	s.t.
9	Brent Bookwalter (USA)	BMC Racing Team	s.t.
10	Moisés Aldape (MEX)	Team Type 1	s.t.

General Classification after Stage 4

	Cyclist	Team	Time
1	Juan José Haedo (ARG)	Team Saxo Bank	15h 35' 08"
2	Thor Hushovd (NOR)	Cervélo TestTeam	+ 0"
3	Dario Cataldo (ITA)	Quick-Step	+ 18"
4	Moisés Aldape (MEX)	Team Type 1	+ 18"
5	Mike Friedman (USA)	Garmin–Slipstream	+ 20"
6	Tomas Vaitkus (LTU)	Astana	+ 20"
7	Michael Creed (USA)	Team Type 1	+ 21"
8	Jeff Louder (USA)	BMC Racing Team	+ 21"
9	Chris Anker Sørensen (DEN)	Team Saxo Bank	+ 22"
10	Michael Rogers (AUS)	Team Columbia–HTC	+ 23"

=== Stage 5 ===
September 11, Sedalia 19 mi (31 km) (ITT)

Stage 5 Results

	Cyclist	Team	Time
1	David Zabriskie (USA)	Garmin–Slipstream	36' 30"
2	Gustav Larsson (SWE)	Team Saxo Bank	+ 30"
3	Tom Zirbel (USA)	Bissell	+ 44"
4	Marco Pinotti (ITA)	Team Columbia–HTC	+ 45"
5	Levi Leipheimer (USA)	Astana	+ 1' 09"
6	Dario Cataldo (ITA)	Quick-Step	+ 1' 10"
7	Scott Zwizanski (USA)	Kelly Benefit Strategies	+ 1' 12"
8	Ben Jacques-Maynes (USA)	Bissell	+ 1' 15"
9	Lars Bak (DEN)	Team Saxo Bank	+ 1' 18"
10	Rory Sutherland (AUS)	OUCH–Maxxis	+ 1' 22"

General Classification after Stage 5

	Cyclist	Team	Time
1	David Zabriskie (USA)	Garmin–Slipstream	16h 12' 04"
2	Gustav Larsson (SWE)	Team Saxo Bank	+ 30"
3	Tom Zirbel (USA)	Bissell	+ 44"
4	Marco Pinotti (ITA)	Team Columbia–HTC	+ 45"
5	Dario Cataldo (ITA)	Quick-Step	+ 1' 02"
6	Levi Leipheimer (USA)	Astana	+ 1' 09"
7	Ben Jacques-Maynes (USA)	Bissell	+ 1' 15"
8	Lars Bak (DEN)	Team Saxo Bank	+ 1' 16"
9	Rory Sutherland (AUS)	OUCH–Maxxis	+ 1' 22"
10	Janez Brajkovič (SLO)	Astana	+ 1' 30"

=== Stage 6 ===
September 12, Chillicothe - Saint Joseph 110.3 mi (177.5 km)

Stage 6 Results

	Cyclist	Team	Time
1	Francesco Chicchi (ITA)	Liquigas	3h 41' 41"
2	Thor Hushovd (NOR)	Cervélo TestTeam	s.t.
3	Lucas Sebastian Haedo (ARG)	Colavita–Sutter Home	s.t.
4	Kevin Lacombe (CAN)	Planet Energy	s.t.
5	Bernhard Eisel (AUT)	Team Columbia–HTC	s.t.
6	Martin Gilbert (CAN)	Planet Energy	s.t.
7	Danilo Wyss (SUI)	BMC Racing Team	s.t.
8	Alex Candelario (USA)	Kelly Benefit Strategies	s.t.
9	Dario Cataldo (ITA)	Quick-Step	s.t.
10	Kiel Reijnen (USA)	Jelly Belly Cycling Team	s.t.

General Classification after Stage 6

	Cyclist	Team	Time
1	David Zabriskie (USA)	Garmin–Slipstream	19h 53' 45"
2	Gustav Larsson (SWE)	Team Saxo Bank	+ 30"
3	Tom Zirbel (USA)	Bissell	+ 44"
4	Marco Pinotti (ITA)	Team Columbia–HTC	+ 45"
5	Dario Cataldo (ITA)	Quick-Step	+ 1' 02"
6	Levi Leipheimer (USA)	Astana	+ 1' 09"
7	Ben Jacques-Maynes (USA)	Bissell	+ 1' 14"
8	Dominique Cornu (BEL)	Quick-Step	+ 1' 15"
9	Lars Bak (DEN)	Team Saxo Bank	+ 1' 16"
10	Rory Sutherland (AUS)	OUCH–Maxxis	+ 1' 22"

=== Stage 7 ===
September 13, Kansas City circuit race - 72.3 mi (116.4 km)

Stage 7 Results

	Cyclist	Team	Time
1	Martin Gilbert (CAN)	Planet Energy	2h 33' 11"
2	Andrew Pinfold (CAN)	OUCH–Maxxis	s.t.
3	Thor Hushovd (NOR)	Cervélo TestTeam	s.t.
4	Bernhard Eisel (AUT)	Team Columbia–HTC	s.t.
5	Kyle Wamsley (USA)	Colavita–Sutter Home	s.t.
6	Francesco Chicchi (ITA)	Liquigas	s.t.
7	John Murphy (USA)	OUCH–Maxxis	s.t.
8	Dario Cataldo (ITA)	Quick-Step	s.t.
9	Davide Frattini (ITA)	Colavita–Sutter Home	s.t.
10	Alex Candelario (USA)	Kelly Benefit Strategies	s.t.

General Classification after Stage 7

	Cyclist	Team	Time
1	David Zabriskie (USA)	Garmin–Slipstream	22h 26' 56"
2	Gustav Larsson (SWE)	Team Saxo Bank	+ 30"
3	Marco Pinotti (ITA)	Team Columbia–HTC	+ 42"
4	Tom Zirbel (USA)	Bissell	+ 44"
5	Dario Cataldo (ITA)	Quick-Step	+ 1' 02"
6	Levi Leipheimer (USA)	Astana	+ 1' 09"
7	Ben Jacques-Maynes (USA)	Bissell	+ 1' 13"
8	Dominique Cornu (BEL)	Quick-Step	+ 1' 15"
9	Lars Bak (DEN)	Team Saxo Bank	+ 1' 16"
10	Rory Sutherland (AUS)	OUCH–Maxxis	+ 1' 22"

== Jersey progress ==
Stage (Winner)	General classification	Sprint Classification	Mountains Classification	Youth Classification	Aggressive Rider	Team Classification
Stage 1 (Mark Cavendish)	Mark Cavendish	Mark Cavendish	Chris Anker Sørensen	Mark Cavendish	Moisés Aldape	Quick-Step
Stage 2 (Mark Cavendish)	Mark Cavendish	Mark Cavendish	Moisés Aldape	Mark Cavendish	François Parisien	Quick-Step
Stage 3 (Thor Hushovd)	Thor Hushovd	Thor Hushovd	Moisés Aldape	Mark Cavendish	Matt Wilson	Quick-Step
Stage 4 (Juan José Haedo)	Juan José Haedo	Thor Hushovd	Moisés Aldape	Dario Cataldo	Bradley White	Quick-Step
Stage 5 (David Zabriskie)	David Zabriskie	Thor Hushovd	Moisés Aldape	Dario Cataldo	no award	Team Saxo Bank
Stage 6 (Francesco Chicchi)	David Zabriskie	Thor Hushovd	Moisés Aldape	Dario Cataldo	Jeremy Hunt	Team Saxo Bank
Stage 7 (Martin Gilbert)	David Zabriskie	Thor Hushovd	Moisés Aldape	Dario Cataldo	Michael Barry	Team Saxo Bank
Final	David Zabriskie	Thor Hushovd	Moisés Aldape	Dario Cataldo		Team Saxo Bank
