= Martin Gilbert (cyclist) =

Canadian cyclist (born 1982)

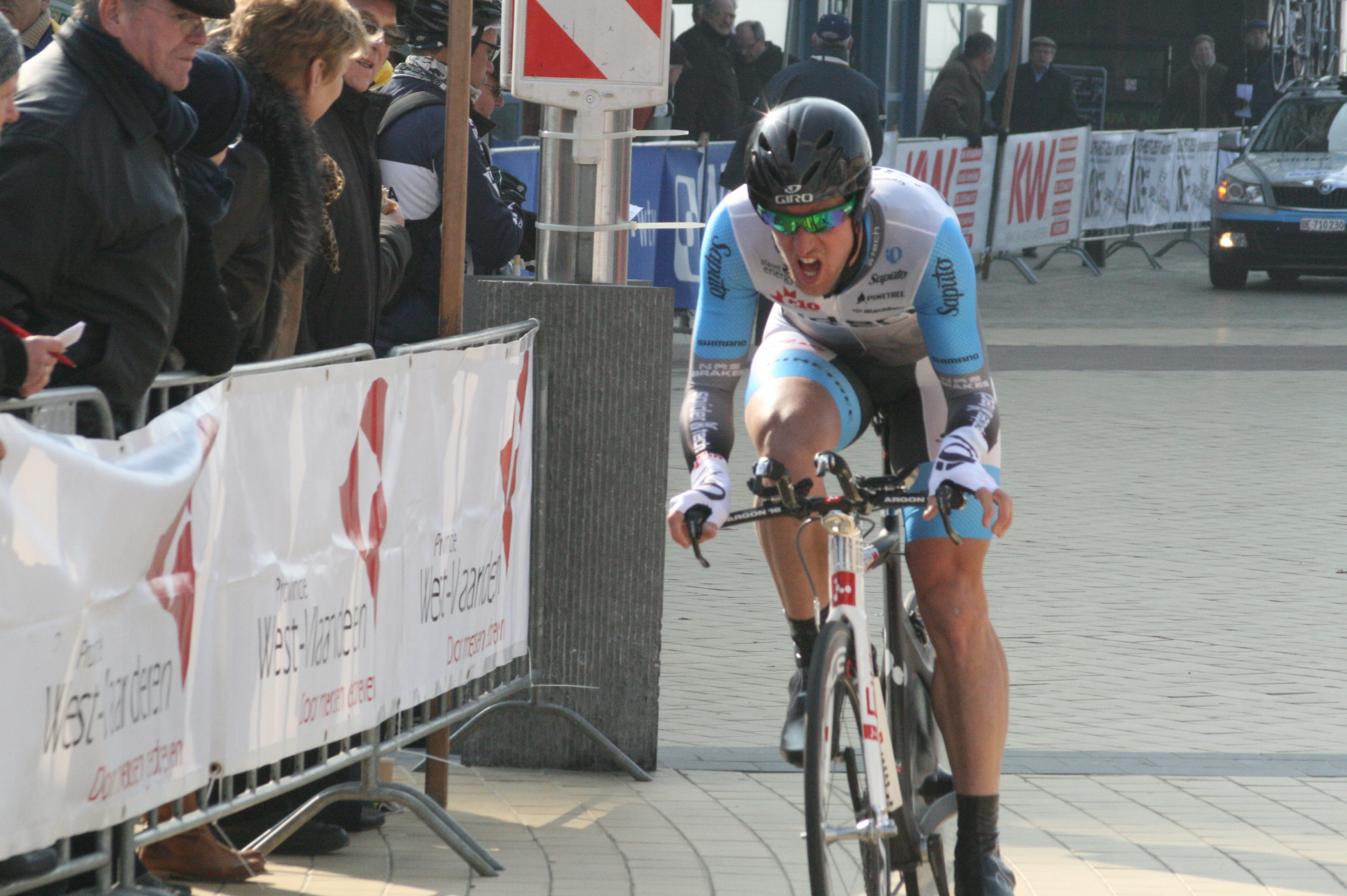

Personal information
- Full name: Martin Gilbert
- Born: October 30, 1982 (age 43) Châteauguay, Quebec, Canada
- Height: 1.77 m (5 ft 10 in)
- Weight: 73 kg (161 lb; 11.5 st)

Cycling career
- Sport: Cycling
- Current team: Retired
- Discipline: Sprinter
- Role: Rider

Professional teams
- 2006: Kodakgallery.com–Sierra Nevada Pro Cycling
- 2007–2008: Kelly Benefit Strategies–Medifast
- 2009–2012: Planet Energy
Medal record
Men's road bicycle racing
Representing Canada
Pan American Championships
Gold medal – first place	2007 Valencia	Road race

Martin Gilbert (born October 30, 1982) is a Canadian former professional racing cyclist and Olympian. He competed in the 2008 Beijing Summer Olympics in the Men's Madison event, placing 12th.

== Major results ==
2000
1st Prologue Tour de l'Abitibi
2003
National Under-23 Road Championships

1st Road race
3rd Time trial

2005
1st Stage 1 Tour de Beauce
8th Road race, Pan American Road Championships
2006
9th Road race, Commonwealth Games
2007
1st Road race, Pan American Road Championships
2009
1st Stage 7 Tour of Missouri
1st Stage 4 Vuelta a Cuba
2010
1st Stages 9 & 11 Vuelta Ciclista del Uruguay
1st Stages 5 & 15 Vuelta a Cuba
7th Philadelphia International Championship
2011
4th Châteauroux Classic
6th Univest Grand Prix
