= Michael Blaudzun =

Danish cyclist

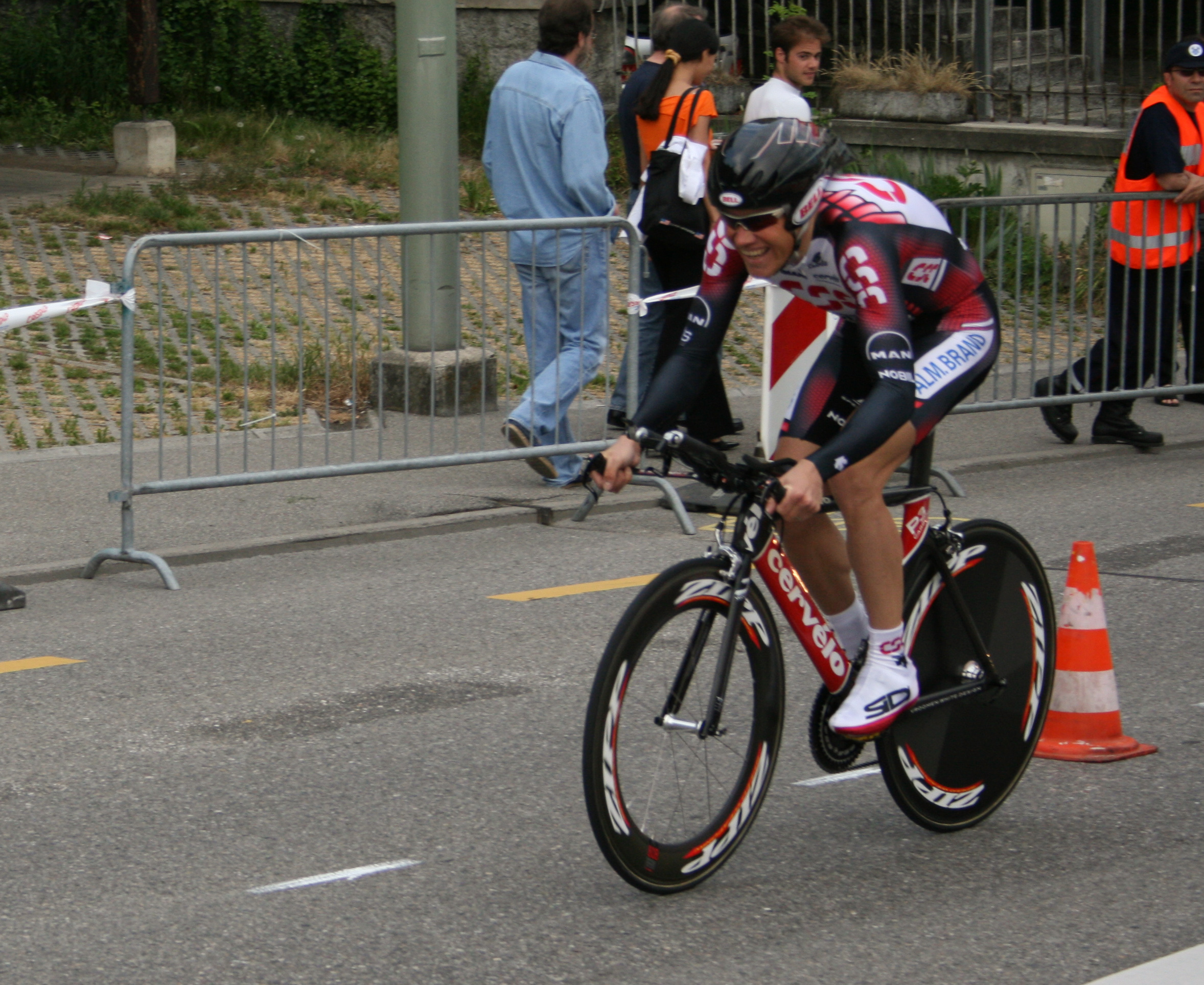

Personal information
- Full name: Michael Blaudzun
- Born: 30 April 1973 (age 53) Herning, Denmark
- Height: 1.80 m (5 ft 11 in)
- Weight: 66 kg (146 lb)

Cycling career
- Sport: Cycling
- Discipline: Road
- Role: Rider
- Rider type: Time-trialist

Professional teams
- until 1994: Herning CK
- 1994: WordPerfect (stagiare)
- 1995-1997: Rabobank
- 1998: Telekom
- 1999-2008: Team CSC

Major wins
- One-day races and Classics National Road Race Championships (1994, 2007) National Time Trial Championships (2001, 2003, 2005)

Michael Blaudzun (born 30 April 1973 in Herning) is a Danish former professional road bicycle racer. Michael is the son of 1972 Summer Olympics track cycling bronze medalist Verner Blaudzun and a strong individual time trial rider who has won the Danish national championship in that discipline in 2001, 2003 and 2005.

After Michael Blaudzun won the 1994 Danish Road Racing Championship while riding for amateur team Herning CK, he was signed for the remainder of the 1994 season as a stagiaire at professional team Word Perfect. For the 1995 season, the Word Perfect team changed its name to Novell, and Michael Blaudzun turned professional for the outfit, riding for the team until 1997, by which time the team had once again changed its name to Rabobank. Blaudzun had a few wins in his time at Rabobank, but when he switched to German outfit Team Telekom in 1998, he only managed a handful of secondary finishes.

For the 1999 season, he switched to Danish Team home - Jack & Jones (later named Team CSC) based on his former team Herning CK. Blaudzun participated in the first ever Tour de France for Team CSC, in the 2000 edition, but he quit the race at the 12th stage. He would ride a further two editions of the Tour de France in 2001 and 2003.

== Major results ==
1993
8th Overall Tour of Sweden
1994
1st National Road race championships
1st Mountains classification Tour de l'Avenir
4th Overall Tour of Sweden
4th Overall Giro delle Regioni
7th Paris–Bourges
10th Circuit des Frontières
1995
5th Overall Tour of Sweden
10th Overall Tour DuPont
1996
1st Overall Tour of Sweden
2nd Overall Tour du Limousin
3rd National Time trial championships
3rd Overall Rheinland-Pfalz Rundfahrt

1st Stage 5b

6th Seraing–Aachen–Seraing
8th Clásica de Almería
1998
7th International Strassenrennen Rund um den Flughafen Köln-Bonn
8th Overall Vuelta a Castilla y León
1999
1st Overall Herald Sun Tour

1st Stage 13

1st Prologue Region Stuttgart Etappenrennen
4th Overall Tour de Picardie
4th Grand Prix de Wallonie
5th Overall Deutschland Tour
6th Grand Prix de Rennes
7th GP de Fourmies
2000
National Road Championships

2nd Time trial
6th Road race

5th Overall Deutschland Tour
5th Overall Tour of Sweden
7th Classic Haribo
9th Overall Danmark Rundt
2001
National Road Championships

1st Time trial
3rd Road race

1st Overall Hessen Rundfahrt
7th Overall Circuit Cycliste de la Sarthe
10th Overall Critérium International
10th World championships time trial
10th Grand Prix des Nations
2002
National Road Championships

2nd Road race
3rd Time trial

9th Overall Peace Race
2003
National Road Championships

1st Time trial

2004
National Road Championships

1st Road race
4th Time trial

1st Stage 5 TTT La Méditerranéenne
2005
National Road Championships

1st Time trial

1st GP Herning
2nd Overall Tour of Britain
4th Rund um Köln
5th Overall Eneco Tour
9th Overall Tour de Georgia
2006
1st Stage 4 TTT Giro d'Italia
1st Eindhoven Team Time Trial
1st Stage 2 TTT Settimana Internazionale di Coppi e Bartali
4th Overall Etoile de Bessèges
2007
1st Eindhoven Team Time Trial
7th Hel van het Mergelland
2008
7th Overall Danmark Rundt
9th Overall Ster Elektrotoer
