= Torsten Schmidt (cyclist) =

German cyclist

Personal information
- Born: 18 February 1972 (age 54) Schwelm, Germany
- Height: 1.79 m (5 ft 10 1/2 in)
- Weight: 73 kg (161 lb; 11 st 7 lb)

Cycling career
- Sport: Cycling
- Current team: Retired
- Discipline: Road
- Role: Rider

Professional teams
- 1996: Die Continentale-Olympia
- 1997: Roslotto-ZG Mobili
- 1998–1999: Team Chicky World
- 2000–2005: Gerolsteiner
- 2006–2007: Wiesenhof–Felt

Torsten Schmidt (born 18 February 1972) is a former German cyclist. After retiring from competition he became a directeur sportif and coach, working with Team CSC, Leopard Trek, Team Katusha, Bora–Hansgrohe and the Swiss national team.

== Career achievements ==
=== Major results ===
1992
1st stage 1 Tour DuPont
1st stage 5 Olympia's Tour
1st stage 1 Tour de Wallonie
1993
2nd Tour de Berlin
1998
1st Grand Prix Théo Mulheims
1st Tour of Normandie

1st stage 1

1st Rund um Düren
1st stage 6 Niedersachsen-Rundfahrt
1st stage 6b Rheinland-Pfalz Rundfahrt
2nd Tour de Berlin
3rd Grand Prix de la Ville de Lillers
1999
1st Route Adélie
1st Niedersachsen-Rundfahrt

1st stage 4b

1st stage 10 Vuelta a Argentina
1st stage 4 3-Länder-Tour
3rd Colliers Classic
3rd Bayern Rundfahrt
2000
1st Niedersachsen-Rundfahrt

1st stage 6

1st Grand Prix EnBW (with Michael Rich)
2001
1st stage 2 3-Länder-Tour
1st stage 4 Rheinland-Pfalz Rundfahrt
2nd Niedersachsen-Rundfahrt
3rd Rund um Köln
2002
2nd 3-Länder-Tour
2004
1st stage 4 Rheinland-Pfalz Rundfahrt
2005
1st Eindhoven Team Time Trial
2006
1st stage 8 Peace Race

=== Grand Tour general classification results timeline ===
Grand Tour	1997	1998	1999	2000	2001	2002	2003	2004	2005
Giro d'Italia	87	—	—	—	—	DNF	—	—	—
Tour de France	136	—	—	—	—	—	DNF	—	—
Vuelta a España	—	—	—	—	—	—	—	—	DNF

Legend
—	Did not compete
DNF	Did not finish
