= David Zabriskie =

Road bicycle racer

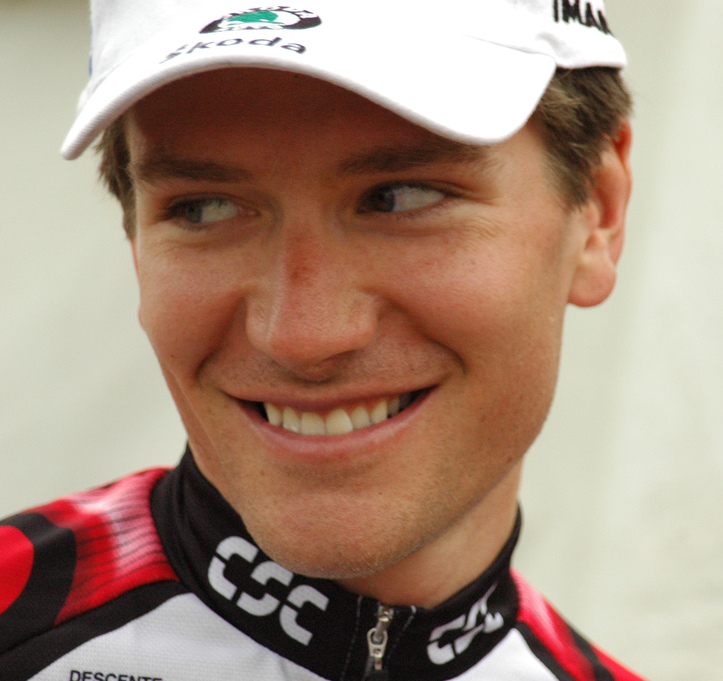
- Zabriskie at the 2006 Tour de Georgia

Personal information
- Full name: David Zabriskie
- Nicknames: "The Green Hornet", DZ, DZNuts, Dizzy, Captain America, Zup
- Born: January 12, 1979 (age 47) Salt Lake City, Utah, U.S.
- Height: 1.83 m (6 ft 0 in)
- Weight: 67 kg (148 lb; 10.6 st)

Cycling career
- Sport: Cycling
- Discipline: Road
- Role: Rider
- Rider type: Time-Trialist

Professional teams
- 1999–2000: 7-UP/Colorado Cyclist
- 2001–2004: U.S. Postal Service
- 2005–2007: Team CSC
- 2008–2013: Slipstream–Chipotle

Major wins
- Grand Tours Giro d'Italia 1 Stage (TTT) (2008) Tour de France 1 Stage (TTT) (2011) Stage races Tour of Missouri (2009) One-day races and Classics National Time Trial Championship (2007, 2008, 2009, 2011, 2012)
Medal record
Representing the United States
Men's road bicycle racing
World Championships
Silver medal – second place	2006 Salzburg	Elite men's time trial
Bronze medal – third place	2008 Varese	Elite men's time trial

David Zabriskie (born January 12, 1979) is a retired professional road bicycle racer from the United States, who competed as a professional between 1999 and 2013. His main strength is individual time trials and his career highlights include stage wins in all three Grand Tour stage races and winning the US National Time Trial Championship seven times. Zabriskie is known for his quirky nature, including singing before stages and the interviews he does with fellow riders in the professional peloton which are posted on his web site.

In 2005, he became the third American to wear the leader's yellow jersey at the Tour de France, after winning the prologue of that year's Tour. However, later admissions of drug use during that time caused him to be stripped of his stage win and the resulting yellow jersey.

On October 10, 2012 – while a member of the Garmin–Sharp squad – it was announced by USADA that he would be suspended for six months for admissions of doping during his time with the US Postal Cycling Team. Later that day, Zabriskie confirmed his acceptance of a six-month ban from September 1, 2012 ending on March 1, 2013 along with a stripping of all race results between May 13, 2003 and July 31, 2006.

== Biography ==
Zabriskie was born in Salt Lake City, Utah, and graduated from Olympus High School in 1997, and made his professional debut with the Colorado Cyclist team in 1999. After displaying his talent for time trials by winning the US National Time Trial Championships (junior and under-23 age categories) and the Grand Prix des Nations (under-23 category), Zabriskie moved on to the U.S. Postal Service team in 2001.

Zabriskie seriously injured his left leg and wrist in 2003 while descending Mill Creek Canyon near Salt Lake City when a vehicle pulled into his lane and collided with him. Upon announcing his retirement in 2013, Zabriskie stated that the injury to his leg still bothered him and indicated it contributed to his decision to retire. Following a year of rehabilitation, he returned to form in 2004, winning the Elite US National Time Trial Championships. He also won stage 11 of the Vuelta a España in a 162 km solo breakaway, marking his first Grand Tour stage win—especially notable among his victories for not being a time trial. In the 2005 season Zabriskie switched to Team CSC, where he racked up another Grand Tour stage victory by winning the 8th stage of the 2005 Giro d'Italia.

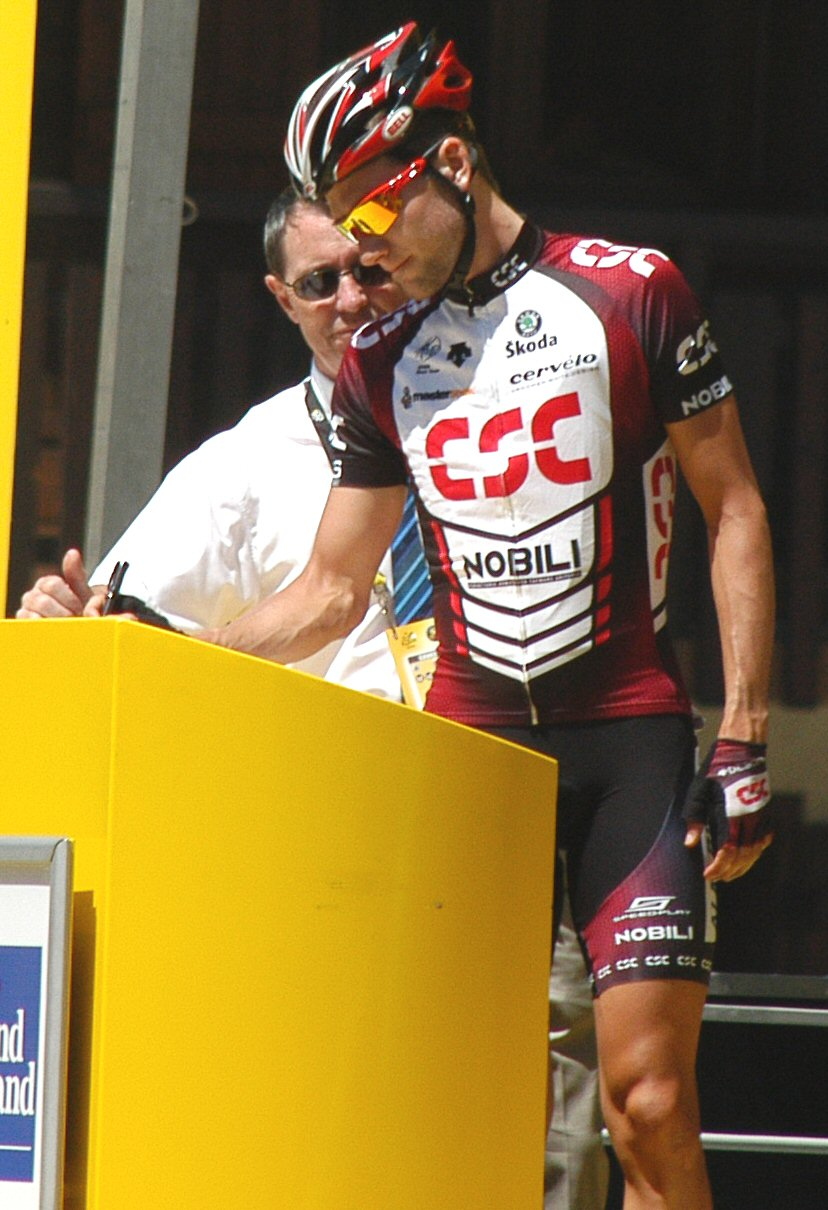
Zabriskie at the 2007 Tour de France.

Despite success on the international cycling scene, Zabriskie did not receive much attention in his native United States until the 2005 Tour de France, when he won the stage 1 time trial, making him the first American to win stages in all three Grand Tours. Zabriskie beat Lance Armstrong by two seconds clocking an average speed of 54.676 km/h. He wore the leader's yellow jersey until the team time trial on stage 4, where he crashed within the final two kilometres, a crash determined as a chain slip though Zabriskie himself did not know what had happened. After the crash, Zabriskie suffered from his injuries and on stage 8, he arrived last, 51'12" after winner Pieter Weening. Zabriskie abandoned the race in the 9th stage after 11 km. Before Zabriskie had fully recovered from his crash in the Tour de France, a swinging glass door at a restaurant injured his hand badly enough to end his 2005 season. Back home from the Tour de France, Zabriskie was honored in Utah by the declaration of "Dave Zabriskie Day" by the mayors of both Salt Lake County and Salt Lake City.

Zabriskie's 2006 season started out well, with a strong 2nd-place finish in the February stage race Amgen Tour of California, 29 seconds after the winner, countryman Floyd Landis. He was initially placed 3rd in the April stage race Ford Tour de Georgia, but as he lost time to the favourite riders on the Brasstown Bald mountain stage, he finished 6th place overall. Dave Zabriskie won two time trials in the Dauphiné Libéré in May, beating Floyd Landis in the prologue by two seconds, and winning Stage 3 by 53 seconds, again ahead of Landis, further proving Zabriskie's outstanding time trialing skills. Following several mountain stages, including a ride up the Mont Ventoux, Zabriskie finished the race in 32nd place, behind winner Levi Leipheimer. Upon completing the 2006 Tour de France in 74th place, Zabriskie became the second American behind Christian Vande Velde to finish all three Grand Tours.

=== 2007 ===
On September 1, 2007, Zabriskie won the US National Time Trial Championship for the third time. He finished The Cliffs South Carolina 18.7 mile course in 39 minutes, 34 seconds (28.4 miles/hour average speed) which was just one second ahead of second-place finisher Danny Pate.

=== 2008 ===
After helping his team win the first stage team time trial at the Giro d'Italia, Zabriskie crashed in the Giro's second stage and had to abandon the race due to a fractured first vertebrae. Zabriskie was selected as one of the five riders for the US Olympic road race team and one of the two for the time trial. Later that year, Zabriskie placed 12th at 1:05:17.82 in the men's time trial at the Beijing Olympics, 3:06 behind race winner Fabian Cancellara.

=== 2011 ===
Zabriskie won stage 6, the Individual Time Trial in the Tour of California. Zabriskie was also key to Garmin–Cervélo's successes in the 2011 Tour de France. Garmin-Cervélo win in the second stage team time trial propelled team leader Thor Hushovd into the yellow jersey. Thor stayed in the yellow jersey until stage 9, the stage Zabriskie seriously injured his wrist in a crash during a descent that also caused the withdrawal of Alexander Vinokourov, Jurgen van den Broeck and Frederik Willems.

== Personal life ==
In 2005, Zabriskie married Randi Reich, a 2005 University of California at Berkeley alumna. In February 2009, burglars entered Zabriskie's home in Salt Lake City, Utah while he was away competing in the Tour of California and stole thousands of dollars' worth of racing equipment and Olympic memorabilia and his Marvel action figure collection. Three men were charged in connection with the burglary. David Zabriskie confirmed at the end of the 2010 cycling season that he is following a vegan based diet, albeit with the addition of salmon. Which would make his diet pescetarian by definition; incorporating seafood into an otherwise vegan diet is less commonly known as seagan.

== Retirement ==
At the beginning of the 2013 Giro di Lombardia Zabriskie announced his retirement after 13 years as a professional cyclist.

== Career achievements ==
=== Major results ===
2000
1st Time trial, National Under–23 Road Championships
2002
1st Stage 1 Sea Otter Classic
2003

Voided results from May 2003 to July 2006

2003
~~1st Young rider classification Four Days of Dunkirk~~
2004
~~1st Time trial, National Road Championships~~
~~Vuelta a España~~

~~1st Stages 1 (TTT) & 11~~

2005
~~1st Stage 1 (ITT) Tour de France~~
~~1st Stage 8 (ITT) Giro d'Italia~~
~~1st Stage 4 (TTT) Tour Méditerranéen~~
2006
~~Critérium du Dauphiné Libéré~~

~~1st Stage 1a & Stage 3 (ITT)~~

~~1st Eindhoven Team Time Trial~~
~~1st Stage 2 (TTT) Settimana Ciclistica Internazionale~~
~~2nd Overall Tour of California~~

2006
1st Time trial, National Road Championships
2nd Time trial, UCI Road World Championships
2007
1st Time trial, National Road Championships
1st Eindhoven Team Time Trial
5th Overall Critérium du Dauphiné Libéré
2008
1st Time trial, National Road Championships
1st Stage 1 Tour of the Bahamas
1st Stage 1 (TTT) Giro d'Italia
1st Stage 4 (TTT) Tour de Georgia
3rd Time trial, UCI Road World Championships
6th Overall Tour of California
2009
1st Time trial, National Road Championships
1st Overall Tour of Missouri

1st Stage 5 (ITT)

2nd Overall Tour of California
3rd Overall Vuelta a Castilla y León
2010
2nd Overall Tour of California

1st Stage 3

2011
1st Time trial, National Road Championships
1st Stage 4 (ITT) Tour de Romandie
1st Stage 6 (ITT) Tour of California
1st Stage 2 (TTT) Tour de France
2012
1st Time trial, National Road Championships
1st Stage 1 (ITT) Tour de Langkawi
1st Stage 2 (TTT) Tour of Utah
2nd Overall Tour of California

1st Stage 5 (ITT)

Combativity award Stage 6, Tour de France

=== Grand Tour general classification results timeline ===
Grand Tour	2002	2003	2004	2005	2006	2007	2008	2009	2010	2011	2012	2013
Giro d'Italia	—	—	—	~~104~~	—	58	—	152	—	—	—	—
Tour de France	—	—	—	~~DNF~~	~~74~~	DNF	—	74	100	DNF	100	—
Vuelta a España	120	—	~~DNF~~	—	—	—	—	—	DNF	—	—	—

Legend
—	Did not compete
DNF	Did not finish
~~No.~~	Voided results

== Footnotes ==
Sporting positions
Preceded by Chris Baldwin	USA National Time Trial Champion; 2006–2009	Succeeded by Taylor Phinney
Preceded by Taylor Phinney	USA National Time Trial Champion; 2011–2012	Succeeded by Tom Zirbel
