= Francesco Chicchi =

Italian cyclist

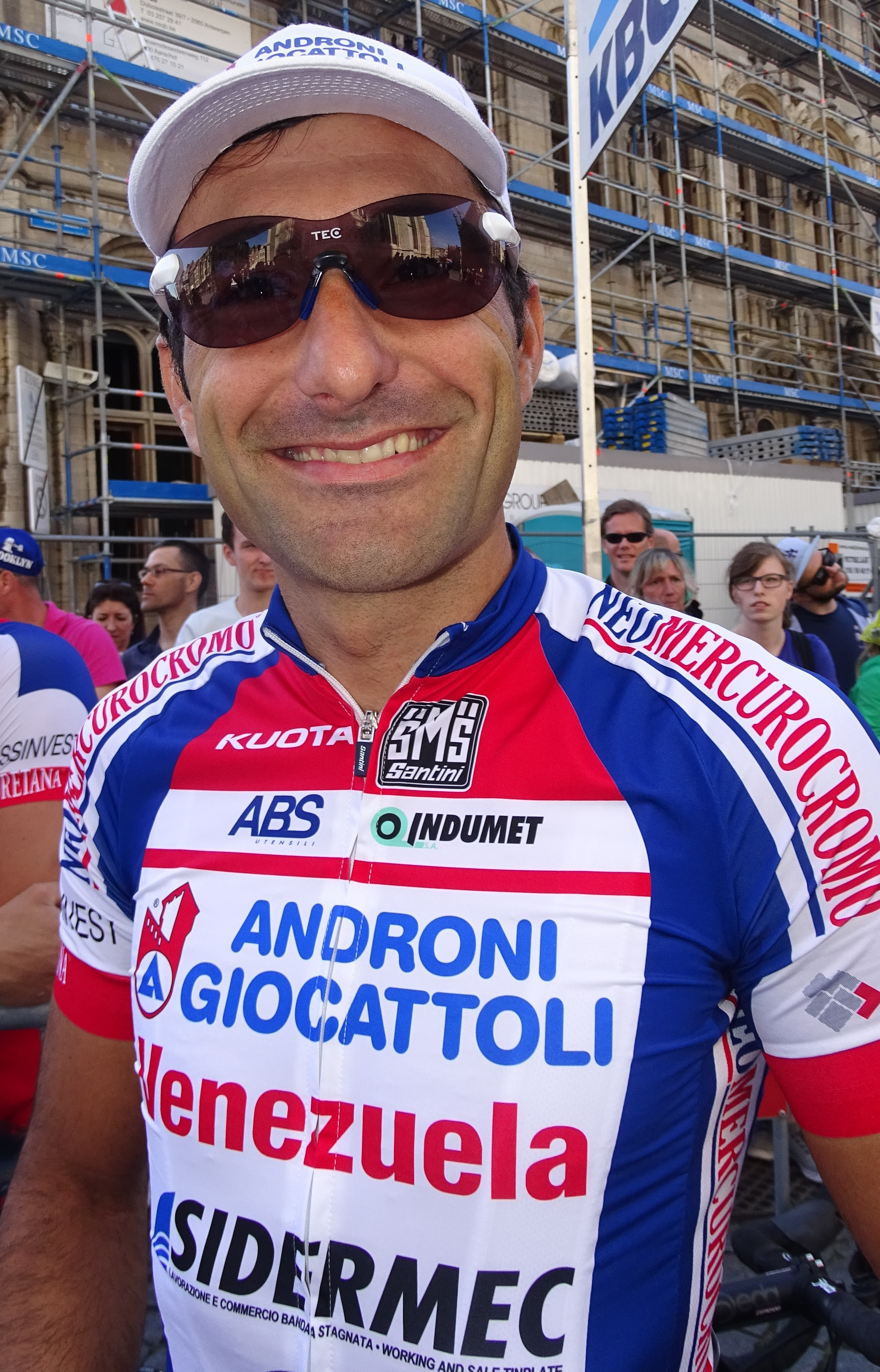
- Francesco Chicchi at the 2015 Brabantse Pijl.

Personal information
- Full name: Francesco Chicchi
- Born: 27 November 1980 (age 45) Camaiore, Italy
- Height: 1.76 m (5 ft 9 in)
- Weight: 76 kg (168 lb)

Cycling career
- Sport: Cycling
- Discipline: Road
- Role: Rider
- Rider type: Sprinter

Professional teams
- 2003–2005: Fassa Bortolo
- 2006: Quick-Step–Innergetic
- 2007–2010: Liquigas
- 2011–2012: Quick-Step
- 2013–2014: Vini Fantini–Selle Italia
- 2015–2016: Androni Giocattoli

Major wins
- Under-23 World Road Race Championships (2002)

Francesco Chicchi (born 27 November 1980 in Camaiore) is an Italian retired professional road bicycle racer, who competed as a professional between 2003 and 2016 for the Fassa Bortolo, Liquigas–Doimo, Omega Pharma–Quick-Step, Neri Sottoli and Androni Giocattoli–Sidermec squads.

== Major results ==
2002
1st Road race, UCI Under-23 Road World Championships
1st Stage 7b Giro Ciclistico d'Italia
2004
3rd International Grand Prix Doha
3rd Giro del Piemonte
2005
1st Stage 1b (TTT) Settimana Internazionale di Coppi e Bartali
3rd Gran Premio della Costa Etruschi
2006
1st Stage 1 Four Days of Dunkirk
1st Stage 5 Tour of Britain
1st Stage 1 Driedaagse van West-Vlaanderen
Vuelta a Mallorca

4th Trofeo Cala Millor
8th Trofeo Mallorca

2007
Danmark Rundt

1st Stages 1 & 4

1st Stage 4 Brixia Tour
2nd Paris–Tours
4th Gran Premio Città di Misano – Adriatico
8th Gran Premio della Costa Etruschi
2008
1st Stage 7 Tirreno–Adriatico
Settimana Internazionale di Coppi e Bartali

1st Stages 1a, 1b (TTT) & 4

1st Stage 4 Tour of Slovenia
1st Stage 5 Volta a Catalunya
1st Stage 7 Tour of Missouri
2nd Gran Premio della Costa Etruschi
2nd Giro di Toscana
5th Gran Premio Città di Misano – Adriatico
2009
1st Stage 6 Tour Down Under
1st Stage 6 Tour of Missouri
9th GP Kranj
2010
1st Gran Premio Città di Misano – Adriatico
1st Stage 1 Tour de San Luis
Settimana Internazionale di Coppi e Bartali

1st Stages 1a & 1b (TTT)

1st Stage 4 Tour of California
1st Stage 4 Tour of Slovenia
8th Overall Tour of Qatar

1st Stages 4 & 6

2011
6th Scheldeprijs
9th Tour de Rijke
2012
1st Nokere Koerse
1st Handzame Classic
Tour de San Luis

1st Stages 1 & 2

1st Stage 1 Driedaagse van West-Vlaanderen
2013
1st Riga–Jūrmala GP
1st Jūrmala GP
Tour de Langkawi

1st Points classification
1st Stages 4 & 10

3rd Châteauroux Classic
2014
Vuelta a Venezuela

1st Stages 1, 7 & 9

3rd Grand Prix de Denain
8th Châteauroux Classic
2015
1st Stage 3 Settimana Internazionale di Coppi e Bartali
1st Stage 6 Vuelta a Venezuela
2016
1st Stage 1 Boucles de la Mayenne

=== Grand Tour general classification results timeline ===
Grand Tour	2007	2008	2009	2010	2011	2012	2013	2014
Giro d'Italia	—	—	—	—	DNF	DNF	DNF	DNF
Tour de France	—	DNF	—	—	—	—	—	—
Vuelta a España	DNF	—	—	—	—	—	—	—

Legend
—	Did not compete
DNF	Did not finish
