= 1998 Vuelta a Castilla y León =

Race details
- Dates: 1–4 June 1998
- Stages: 4
- Distance: 617.3 km (383.6 mi)
- Winning time: 15h 40' 58"

Results
	Winner	Aitor Garmendia (ESP)
	Second	Ángel Casero (ESP)
	Third	Jan Ullrich (GER)

The 1998 Vuelta a Castilla y León was the 13th edition of the Vuelta a Castilla y León cycle race and was held on 1 June to 4 June 1998. The race started in Palencia and finished in Valladolid. The race was won by Aitor Garmendia.

== General classification ==
Final general classification

Rank	Rider	Time
1	Aitor Garmendia (ESP)	15h 40' 58"
2	Ángel Casero (ESP)	+ 1' 05"
3	Jan Ullrich (GER)	+ 1' 06"
4	Melcior Mauri (ESP)	+ 1' 12"
5	Fernando Escartín (ESP)	+ 1' 21"
6	David Cañada (ESP)	+ 1' 55"
7	Fausto Dotti (ITA)	+ 2' 44"
8	Michael Blaudzun (DEN)	+ 3' 40"
9	Orlando Rodrigues (POR)	+ 3' 58"
10	Víctor Hugo Peña (COL)	+ 4' 27"
