= Niedersachsen Rundfahrt =

Niedersachsen–Rundfahrt
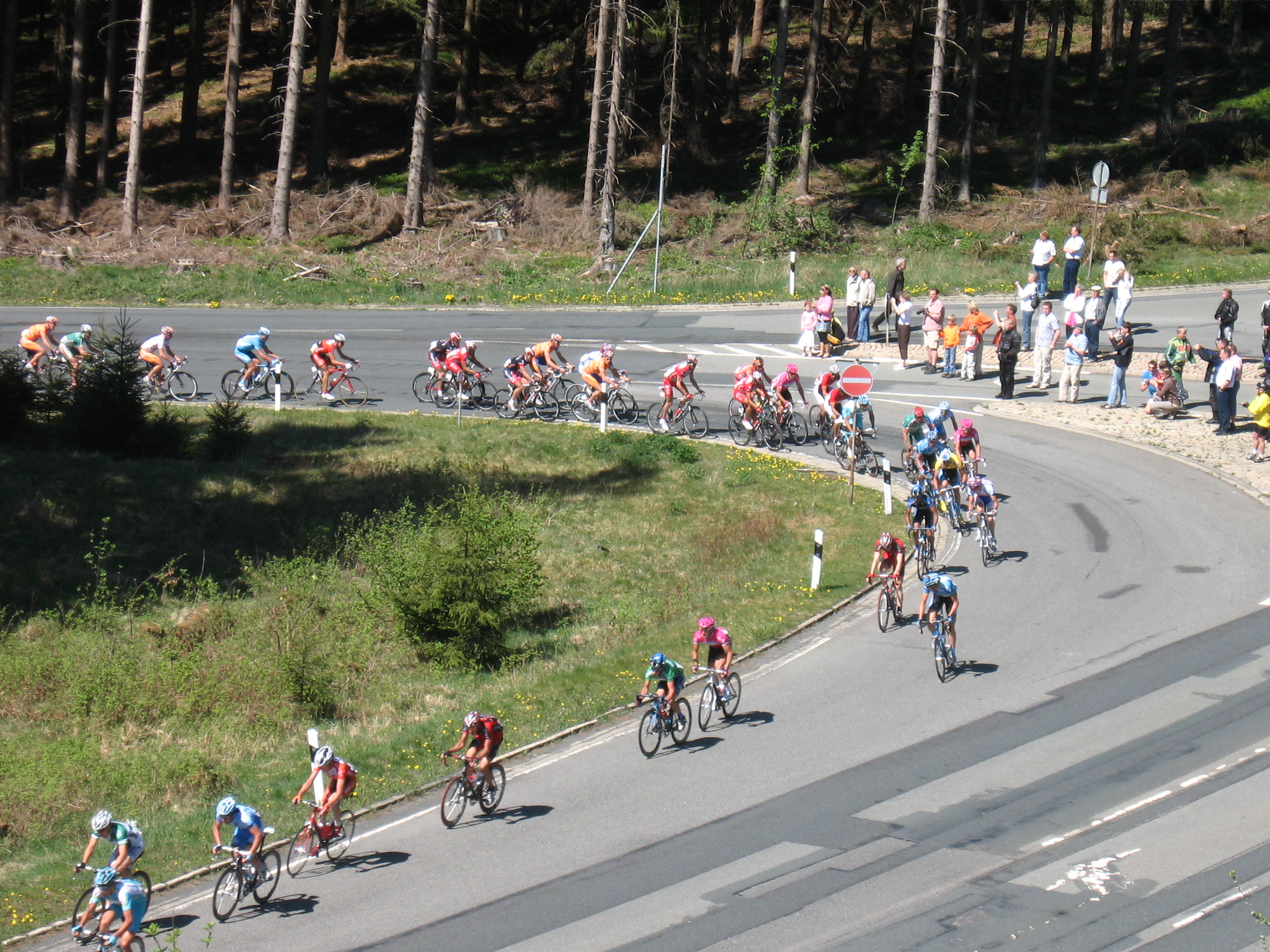

Race details
- Date: Late April
- Region: Lower Saxony, Germany
- English name: Lower Saxony Tour
- Local name: Niedersachsen-Rundfahrt (in German)
- Discipline: Road
- Competition: UCI Europe Tour
- Type: Stage-race

History
- First edition: 1977
- Editions: 31 (as of 2007)
- First winner: Hans Langerijs (NED)
- Most recent: Alessandro Petacchi (ITA)

The Internationale Niedersachsen–Rundfahrt is a multi-stage road bicycle race held in Lower Saxony, Germany. It was first held in 1977 and since 2005 it has been organised as a 2.1 event on the UCI Europe Tour.

== Winners ==
Year	Country	Rider	Team
1977	Netherlands	Hans Langerijs	
1978	West Germany	Peter Becker (cyclist)	
1979	Denmark	Kim Andersen	
1980	Soviet Union	Viacheslav Dedenov	
1981	East Germany	Olaf Ludwig	
1982	Netherlands	Toon van der Steen	
1983	Soviet Union	Dainis Liepiņš	
1984	Soviet Union	Aleksandr Zinoviev	
1985	East Germany	Uwe Ampler	
1986	Soviet Union	Sergey Uslamin	
1987	Austria	Helmut Wechselberger	
1988	East Germany	Dirk Meier	
1989	East Germany	Carsten Wolf	
1990	East Germany	Thomas Liese	
1991	Czechoslovakia	Lubor Tesar	
1992	Germany	Steffen Wesemann	
1993	Germany	Bert Dietz	
1994	Germany	Jens Voigt	
1995	Czech Republic	Pavel Padrnos	
1996	Germany	Stephan Gottschling	
1997	Germany	Jens Voigt	
1998	Germany	Andreas Klöden	
1999	Germany	Torsten Schmidt	
2000	Germany	Torsten Schmidt	
2001	Germany	Grischa Niermann	
2002	Germany	Olaf Pollack	
2003	France	Nicolas Jalabert	
2004	Belgium	Bert Roesems	
2005	Germany	Stefan Schumacher	
2006	Italy	Alessandro Petacchi	
2007	Italy	Alessandro Petacchi	
