= Christian Vande Velde =

American cyclist (born 1976)

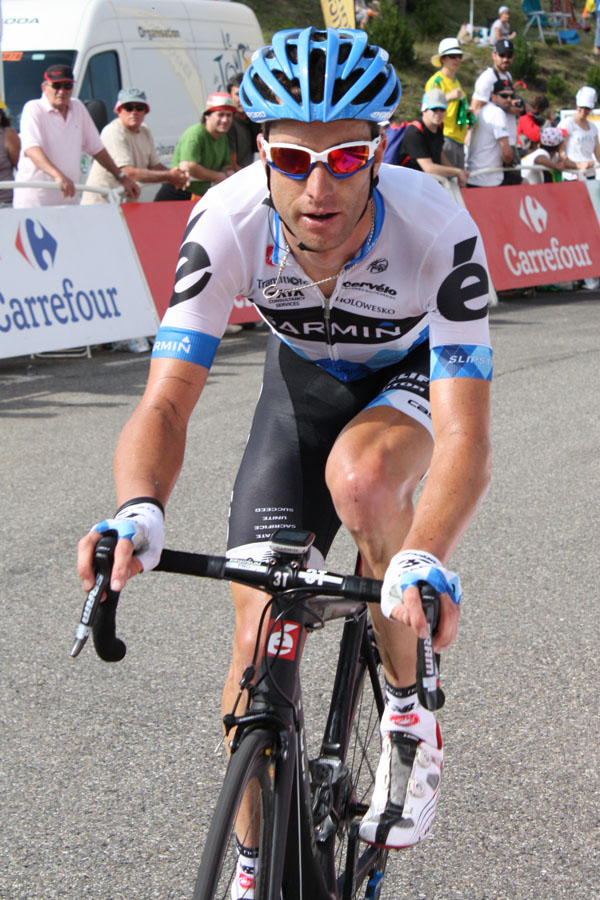
- Vande Velde at the 2011 Tour de France

Personal information
- Full name: Christian Vande Velde
- Nicknames: VDV, CVV
- Born: May 22, 1976 (age 50) Lemont, Illinois, U.S.
- Height: 1.80 m (5 ft 11 in)
- Weight: 69 kg (152 lb; 10.9 st)

Cycling career
- Sport: Cycling
- Current team: Retired
- Discipline: Road
- Role: Rider
- Rider type: All-rounder

Professional teams
- 1998–2003: U.S. Postal Service
- 2004: Liberty Seguros
- 2005–2007: Team CSC
- 2008–2013: Slipstream–Chipotle

Major wins
- Grand Tours Tour de France 1 TTT stage (2011) Giro d'Italia 2 TTT stages (2008, 2012) Stage races Tour de Luxembourg (2006) Tour of Missouri (2008) USA Pro Cycling Challenge (2012)

Christian Vande Velde (born May 22, 1976) is a retired American professional road racing cyclist who rode professionally between 1998 and 2013. Vande Velde competed for the U.S. Postal Service, Liberty Seguros, Team CSC and Garmin–Sharp squads. He has been a cycling analyst for NBC Sports since 2014. He is the son of cyclist John Vande Velde.

== Career ==
=== 1998–2006 ===
Vande Velde started his Grand Tour career by participating in the 1998 Vuelta a España, where he assisted Lance Armstrong to a fourth-place finish. Vande Velde twice rode on the Tour de France team that brought Lance Armstrong to victory, in 1999, and 2001. In the 1999 Tour de France, Vande Velde was for a time the leader of the young rider classification; he did not compete, however, in the 2000 Tour de France. Vande Velde moved to Liberty Seguros in 2004, and switched to Team CSC in 2005. During this time, he worked as a domestique, riding in support of varying team captains, even though the 2005 season saw Vande Velde taking chances of his own. In one instance, Vande Velde was a breakaway participant on the fourth stage of the Eneco Tour. The breakaway, however, was eventually hampered when the peloton was led on a false route, meaning the breakaway riders had to wait for the peloton to get back on track, at which time the gap between the break and the peloton was reduced from six to four minutes with 43 kilometres to go.

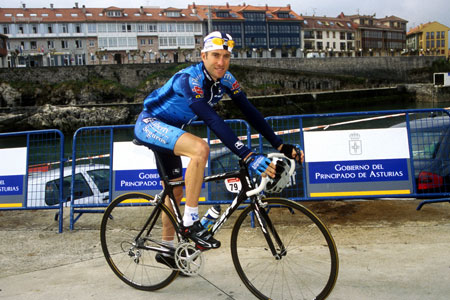
Vande Velde in 2006

At the 2006 Tour de Luxembourg, Vande Velde showed impressive performances in the mountains, which secured him first overall in the general classification.

In the 2006 Tour de France, he was a domestique on Team CSC for team captains Carlos Sastre and Fränk Schleck. Vande Velde was the best of the climbers in the team apart from Sastre and Schleck, whom he supported in the high mountain stages. On Stage 16, he pulled for most of the early slopes of the Col de la Croix de Fer, after which, team-mates Sastre and Schleck attacked to put then race leader Floyd Landis (Phonak) under pressure. On Stage 17, to Morzine, he again pulled for most of the day along with team-mates Jens Voigt, Matthias Kessler, and Serhiy Honchar from the T-Mobile Team.

=== 2007–2011 ===
With Slipstream–Chipotle's team time trial win, Vande Velde became the first American to wear the pink jersey as leader of the general classification since Andrew Hampsten in 1988. Vande Velde finished the 2008 Tour de France in fourth place, 3'05" behind the winner Carlos Sastre, and seventeenth in the Olympic Road Race. In the 2009 Tour de France, Vande Velde finished seventh in the overall standings.

Vande Velde won the 2008 Tour of Missouri.

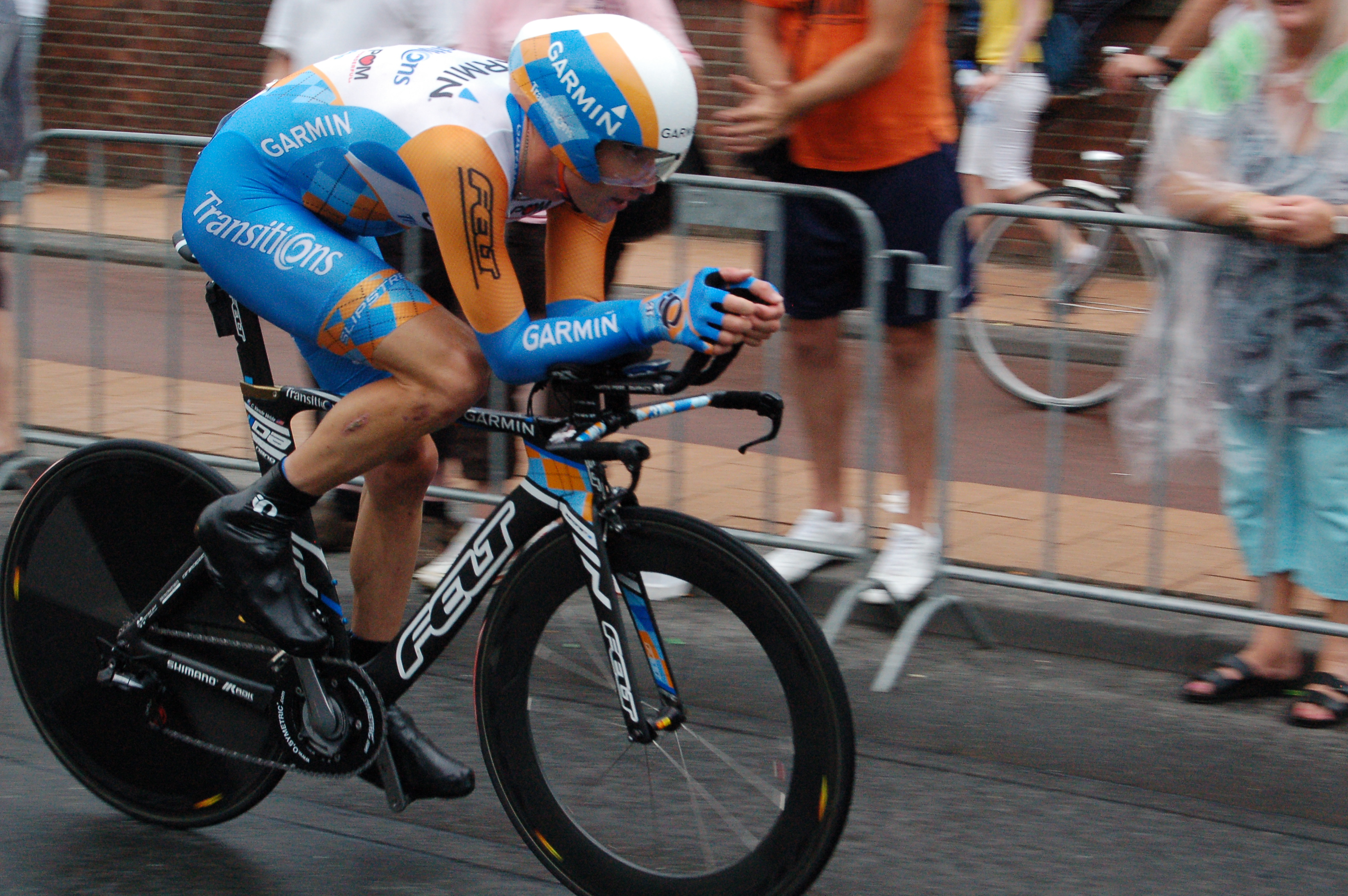
Vande Velde at the 2010 Tour de France

Vande Velde crashed out of the 2010 Giro d'Italia on the third stage with a suspected clavicle break. Coincidentally, in 2009 he was forced out of the Giro after a crash, also on stage three. Vande Velde withdrew from the 2010 Tour de France upon completing the second stage, with two broken ribs. The crash was caused by oil leaking from a fallen television motorcycle.

During the 2011 Tour de France, Vande Velde assisted Tom Danielson to a top ten finish, and was an integral part of Garmin–Cervélo's first place in the team classification. Vande Velde finished a close second at the 2011 USA Pro Cycling Challenge, which was ultimately won by Levi Leipheimer (Team RadioShack).

=== 2012–2013 ===
In the 2012 Giro d'Italia, Vande Velde was instrumental to the victory of his leader Ryder Hesjedal, protecting him in the mountain stages. He also was Hesjedal's roommate during the Giro, and shared his thoughts about the race, and his teammate in an interview with Velo News, where he stated that winning the Giro was "surreal". Suffering various crashes during the first week, Vande Velde, however, finished second in the fifteenth stage of the 2012 Tour de France, losing in a sprint to the finish to Frenchman Pierrick Fedrigo (FDJ–BigMat). NBC Sports commentator Phil Liggett stated that amongst fans, Vande Velde was considered the most popular rider. In the 2012 USA Pro Cycling Challenge, Vande Velde put in an impressive performance in the last stage's individual time trial, finishing second to Taylor Phinney of BMC Racing Team by ten seconds. With that run, he took the leader's jersey off the shoulders of Omega Pharma–Quick-Step's Levi Leipheimer, and stepped atop the overall classification podium.

During Vande Velde's first race of the season, the 2013 Volta a Catalunya, Vande Velde crashed out with a metacarpal fracture. Vande Velde started the 2013 Giro d'Italia hoping to assist teammate Ryder Hesjedal in a repeat victory, however, Hesjedal withdrew following stage twelve. After Hesjedal's departure, Vande Velde struggled through the race, and finished hundred-tenth overall. Following his disappointing Giro, Vande Velde rode the 2013 Tour de France, but withdrew on stage seven due to sustained injuries from stage five. After the Tour de France, Vande Velde attempted to defend his USA Pro Cycling Challenge title, however, he rode a quiet race, and finished twenty-second overall. Vande Velde's strongest performance during the race was on stage five, when he placed ninth in the uphill individual time trial.

Vande Velde retired from professional cycling at the conclusion of the 2013 UCI World Team Time Trial Championships.

== Doping confession ==
In a September 2012, online forum post, Garmin-Sharp team manager and owner Jonathan Vaughters stated that Vande Velde had used blood doping products to increase red blood cell production. On October 10, 2012, it was announced by USADA that he would be suspended for six months for admissions of doping during his time with the US Postal Cycling Team. Later that day a statement was released confirming his acceptance of a six-month ban from September 1, 2012, ending on March 1, 2013, along with a stripping of all race results between June 4, 2004, and April 30, 2006. Vande Velde released his own statement a day later that expressed regret at his decision to "cross the line".

== Personal life ==
Vande Velde currently resides in Greenville, South Carolina with his wife Leah, and their two daughters. He is an alumnus of Lemont High School.

== Career achievements ==
=== Major results ===
1999
1st Overall Redlands Bicycle Classic
3rd Overall Four Days of Dunkirk

1st Young rider classification

4th Overall Circuit de la Sarthe
2000
9th Grand Prix Eddy Merckx
2001
4th Overall Three Days of De Panne
5th Overall Volta a la Comunitat Valenciana
2002
1st Stage 1 (TTT) Volta a Catalunya
2004

Voided results from June 4, 2004 to April 30, 2006.

2005
~~1st Mountains classification Eneco Tour~~

2006
1st Overall Tour de Luxembourg
2nd Overall Tour of Elk Grove
9th Overall Tour of California
2007
1st Eindhoven Team Time Trial
2nd Overall Tour de Georgia
6th Overall Tour of California
2008
1st USA Cycling Professional Tour
Giro d'Italia

1st Stage 1 (TTT)
Held after Stage 1

1st Overall Tour of Missouri

1st Stage 3 (TTT)

2nd Overall Circuit de la Sarthe

1st Stage 2

2nd Overall Tour of the Bahamas
3rd Time trial, National Road Championships
3rd Overall Tour of California
4th Overall Tour de France
7th Overall Tour de Georgia

1st Stage 4 (TTT)

10th Overall Vuelta a Castilla y León
2009
1st Stage 4 Paris–Nice
7th Overall Tour de France
2011
1st Stage 2 (TTT) Tour de France
2nd Overall USA Pro Cycling Challenge
4th Overall Tour of California
5th Overall Tour of Oman
6th Overall Tour of Utah
2012
1st Overall USA Pro Cycling Challenge
1st Stage 4 (TTT) Giro d'Italia
1st Stage 2 (TTT) Tour of Utah

=== Grand Tour general classification results timeline ===
Grand Tour	1998	1999	2000	2001	2002	2003	2004	2005	2006	2007	2008	2009	2010	2011	2012	2013
Giro d'Italia	—	—	—	—	—	—	—	~~114~~	—	—	52	DNF	DNF	—	22	110
Tour de France	—	85	—	DNF	—	—	~~56~~	—	22	24	4	7	DNF	16	60	DNF
Vuelta a España	90	—	—	—	25	—	—	~~31~~	—	39	—	—	58	—	—	—

Did not finish = DNF; In progress = IP; Voided results = ~~struck through~~.
