= Michael Barry (cyclist) =

Canadian cyclist (born 1975)

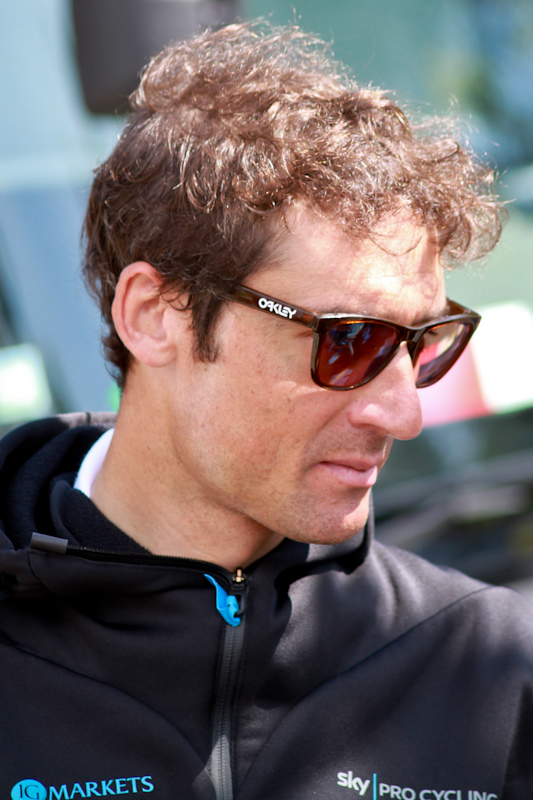
- Barry at the 2011 Tour de Romandie.

Personal information
- Full name: Michael Barry
- Born: 18 December 1975 (age 50) Toronto, Ontario, Canada
- Height: 1.88 m (6 ft 2 in)
- Weight: 69 kg (152 lb)

Cycling career
- Sport: Cycling
- Discipline: Road
- Role: Rider
- Rider type: All-Rounder/Domestique

Professional teams
- 1999–2001: Saturn
- 2002–2006: U.S. Postal Service
- 2007–2009: T-Mobile Team
- 2010–2012: Team Sky

Major wins
- Grand Tours Giro d'Italia 1 TTT stage (2009)

Michael Barry (born 18 December 1975) is a Canadian author and former professional road racing cyclist. Barry raced for numerous world-class teams with the role of 'domestique'. His greatest personal successes were placing eighth in the 2008 Beijing Olympics' road race, finishing second in the Canadian National Road Race Championships in 2001 and 2012, and winning a stage of the Tour of Missouri in 2008. He announced his retirement in September 2012, stating that the 2012 Tour of Beijing would be his last race. He is also an author who has written three books.

== Career ==
He was born and raised in Toronto, Ontario. His father, Michael (Mike) Barry Sr., was a racer himself in England in the 1950s, who until 2006 ran a specialty bike store and manufactured a line of hand-made bicycle frames under his own Mariposa brand. As a result, the younger Barry grew up in a cycling-intense environment, and started racing at a very young age. He has been a professional since 1998. He has spent many years on the Canadian National Team during the early years of his career. His wife is 2004 Olympic Silver Medalist Dede Demet Barry. They have 2 children.

Previous to riding for UCI ProTour team Team Sky Barry spent several years with the Discovery Channel team. He also raced with the Saturn Cycling Team for a number of years before going to US Postal Service/Discovery.

Barry has raced in 5 Vuelta a Españas and 5 Giro d'Italias but in 2007 had to abandon the Giro due to health issues, which put him out most of the season. He also had to pull out of the 2002 Vuelta a España after colliding with a motorcycle on the eight stage.

In 2005 he wrote the book: Inside the Postal Bus, about his experiences at U.S. Postal Service and the 2004 season whilst riding in support of Lance Armstrong. The work contains texts authored by some of his team mates, including George Hincapie. When the doping topic arises in the book, Barry vehemently denies having ever witnessed any drug intake in the team. He and his wife also wrote a training book. He also writes diary entries during his cycling season. His third book, Le Metier, detailing the life of a cycling domestique, was published in 2010 by Rouleur.

He is generally considered a support rider, or domestique, helping the team leaders win races, but he will often get the opportunity to go for personal results. He is usually the team leader for Canada for the World Championships. His strengths lie in the time-trial, and hilly road races. He can be counted on for grand tours, and other stage races as well.

For 2010, he left HTC–Highroad, and signed with Team Sky for 2 years. On 24 June 2010, Team Sky announced that Barry would be part of its 2010 Tour de France team. This would be Barry's first Tour de France appearance after thirteen seasons as a professional.

On 5 September 2012, Barry announced he would retire at the end of the season, after his last race, October's Tour of Beijing.

== Doping ==
On 10 October 2012 it was announced by USADA that he would be suspended for six months for admissions of doping during his time with the US Postal Cycling Team. Later that day a statement was released confirming his acceptance of a six-month ban from 1 September 2012 ending on 1 March 2013 along with a stripping of all race results between 13 May 2003 and 31 July 2006. He confessed that the US Postal team were using performance-enhancing drugs.

== Highlights ==
Highlights include:

- Stage win at the 2008 Tour of Missouri
- Placed 9th in the men's road race at the 2008 Beijing Olympics
- Placing 4th overall in the 2003 Tour de Georgia
- At the 2006 Tour of Flanders, Barry went down extremely hard in a crash, suffering severe facial cuts and lacerations and also fracturing some vertebrae.

== Major results ==
1997
1st Road race, National Under-23 Road Championships
1999
2nd First Union Invitational
4th Overall Ringerike GP
8th Overall GP de Beauce
10th Overall Tour Trans-Canada
2000
5th Overall Ringerike GP
6th Overall Redlands Classic
2001
2nd Road race, National Road Championships
2nd BMC San Francisco GP
4th Overall Peace Race
4th Overall GP de Beauce
7th Samsung Classic
7th First Union Invitational
2002
1st Stage 1 (TTT) Volta a Catalunya
6th First Union Invitational
9th Road race, Commonwealth Games
2003
4th Overall Tour de Georgia

Voided results from 13 May 2003 to 31 July 2006.

2003
~~7th Road race, UCI Road World Championships~~
2004
~~1st Stage 1 (TTT) Vuelta a España~~
2005
~~6th Overall Tour of Austria~~

~~1st Points classification~~
~~1st Stage 1~~

2006
~~2nd Eindhoven Team Time Trial~~

2007
3rd Overall Sachsen Tour
2008
5th Overall Tour of Ireland
8th Road race, Olympic Games
10th Overall Tour of Missouri

1st Stage 4

2009
1st Stage 1 (TTT) Giro d'Italia
2012
2nd Road race, National Road Championships
