= 2005 Eindhoven Team Time Trial =

Dutch road cycling race

These are the results for the 2005 edition of the TTT Eindhoven race, won by Gerolsteiner ahead of Phonak.

== General Standings ==
=== 19-06-2005: Eindhoven, 48.6 km. (TTT) ===
	Team	Country	Time
1	Gerolsteiner	Germany	53'35"
2	Phonak Hearing Systems	Switzerland	+ 3"
3	Team CSC	Denmark	+ 24"
4	Rabobank	Netherlands	+ 51"
5	Discovery Channel	USA	+ 54"
6	Davitamon-Lotto	Belgium	+ 1'20"
7	Domina Vacanze	Italy	+ 1'25"
8	Illes Balears-Caisse d'Epargne	Spain	+ 1'40"
9	Crédit Agricole	France	+ 1'42"
10	Cofidis	France	+ 1'46"
