= Moisés Aldape =

Mexican cyclist (born 1981)

Personal information
- Full name: Moisés Aldape Chávez
- Born: 14 August 1981 (age 45) Mexico

Cycling career
- Sport: Cycling
- Current team: Team Novo Nordisk
- Discipline: Road

Professional teams
- 2005–2007: Ceramica Panaria–Navigare
- 2008–: Team Type 1

Major wins
- Mountains Classification of the Tour of Missouri

Moisés Aldape Chávez (born 14 August 1981 in León) is a Mexican professional road bicycle racer for UCI Continental team Team Novo Nordisk. He was part of the Mexican squad for the 2008 Summer Olympics in Beijing, where he finished 47th in the men's road race.

== Career highlights ==
2007
1st overall, Vuelta a Guanajuato, Mexico

Winner Stage 2

2008
Cascade Cycling Classic, United States

Winner Stage 5

2009
Cascade Cycling Classic, United States

Winner Stage 4

Tour of Missouri Mountains Classification
