= 2006 Eindhoven Team Time Trial =

Dutch road cycling race

The 2006 edition of the Eindhoven Team Time Trial was held on June 18 in Eindhoven, Netherlands. It marked the second year of this UCI ProTour event, which is a team time trial competition between the world's elite professional cycling teams and consists of the eight riders for each team riding in unison against the clock. The team with the fastest time through the 48.6 km course based on the time of its first five riders wins the competition.

In 2006, Team CSC finished in first place with a time of 52 minutes, 28 seconds, which was 42 seconds ahead of second-place finisher Discovery Channel and 55 seconds ahead of the 2005 champion Gerolsteiner.

== General Standings ==
=== 18 June 2006: Eindhoven, 48.6 km. (TTT) ===
	Team	Time
1	Team CSC	52' 28"
2	Discovery Channel	+ 42"
3	Gerolsteiner	+ 55"
4	Phonak	+ 1' 25"
5	Davitamon–Lotto	+ 1' 31"
