= 2005–06 UCI America Tour =

- Second edition of the UCI America Tour

Details
- Dates: 2 October 2005–9 September 2006
- Location: North America and South America
- Races: 27

Champions
- Individual champion: José Serpa (COL) (Selle Italia–Diquigiovanni)
- Teams' champion: Selle Italia–Diquigiovanni
- Nations' champion: Colombia

The 2005–06 UCI America Tour was the second season for the UCI America Tour. The season began on 2 October 2005 with the Clásico Ciclístico Banfoandes and ended on 9 September 2006 with the Univest Grand Prix.

The points leader, based on the cumulative results of previous races, wears the UCI America Tour cycling jersey. Edgardo Simón of Argentina was the defending champion of the 2005 UCI America Tour. José Serpa of Colombia was crowned as the 2005–06 UCI America Tour champion.

Throughout the season, points are awarded to the top finishers of stages within stage races and the final general classification standings of each of the stages races and one-day events. The quality and complexity of a race also determines how many points are awarded to the top finishers, the higher the UCI rating of a race, the more points are awarded.

The UCI ratings from highest to lowest are as follows:

- Multi-day events: 2.HC, 2.1 and 2.2
- One-day events: 1.HC, 1.1 and 1.2

== Events ==
=== 2005 ===
Date	Race name	Location	UCI Rating	Winner	Team
2–9 October	Clásico Ciclístico Banfoandes	Venezuela	2.2	José Rujano (VEN)	Colombia–Selle Italia
8–13 November	Doble Copacabana Grand Prix Fides	Bolivia	2.2	Libardo Niño (ESP)	Lotería de Boyacá
16–29 December	Vuelta Ciclista a Costa Rica	Costa Rica	2.2	Juan Carlos Rojas (CRC)	Pasoca–Dos Pinos

=== 2006 ===
Date	Race name	Location	UCI Rating	Winner	Team
7–20 January	Vuelta al Táchira	Venezuela	2.2	Manuel Medina (VEN)	Cabimas
8 January	Copa América de Ciclismo	Brazil	1.2	Nilceu Santos (BRA)	Scott–Marcondes Cesar
7–19 February	Vuelta a Cuba	Cuba	2.2	Pedro Pablo Pérez (CUB)	Cuba (national team)
19–26 February	Tour of California	United States	2.1	Floyd Landis (USA)	Phonak
28 February–5 March	Vuelta Sonora	Mexico	2.2	Gregorio Ladino (COL)	Tecos
8–12 March	Volta Ciclística Internacional Porto Alegre	Brazil	2.2	Armando Camargo (BRA)	Memorial Santos
9–19 March	Vuelta Ciclista Por Un Chile Lider	Chile	2.2	Andrei Sartassov (RUS)	Team Lider Presto
19–26 March	Volta de Ciclismo Internacional do Estado de São Paulo	Brazil	2.2	Alex Diniz (BRA)	Cesc–São Caetano
18–23 April	Tour de Georgia	United States	2.HC	Floyd Landis (USA)	Phonak
29 April–6 May	Vuelta a El Salvador	El Salvador	2.2	Gregorio Ladino (COL)	Tecos
4–14 May	Vuelta Ciclista de Chile	Chile	2.2	Andrei Sartassov (RUS)	Team Lider Presto
11–14 May	Doble Sucre Potosí Grand Prix	Bolivia	2.2	Alejandro Ramírez (ECU)	Orbitel
24–28 May	Volta do Paraná	Brazil	2.2	Márcio May (BRA)	Scott–Marcondes
4 June	Lancaster Classic	United States	1.1	Jackson Stewart (USA)	Kodakgallery.com–Sierra Nevada
4 June	Pan American Road and Track Championships – Road Race	Brazil	CC	José Serpa (COL)	Colombia (national team)
6 June	Pan American Road and Track Championships – Time Trial	Brazil	CC	Pedro Nicacio (BRA)	Brazil (national team)
8 June	Reading Classic	United States	1.1	Greg Henderson (NZL)	Health Net–Maxxis
11 June	Philadelphia International Championship	United States	1.HC	Greg Henderson (NZL)	Health Net–Maxxis
13–18 June	Tour de Beauce	Canada	2.2	Valery Kobzarenko (UKR)	Ceramica Panaria–Navigare
9 July	Prova Ciclística 9 de Julho	Brazil	1.2	Renato Seabra (BRA)	Blumenau–Dataro
9–16 July	Vuelta Oaxaca	Mexico	2.2	Fausto Esparza (MEX)	Tecos
16 July	Meeting Internacional de Ciclismo	Brazil	1.2	Héctor Aguilar (URY)	Uruguay (national team)
6–20 August	Vuelta a Colombia	Colombia	2.2	José Castelblanco (COL)	Alcaldia de Cabimas
28 August–10 September	Vuelta a Venezuela	Venezuela	2.2	José Serpa (COL)	Selle Italia–Diquigiovanni
8 September	Univest Grand Prix	United States	1.2	Shawn Milne (USA)	Ceramica Panaria–Navigare

== Final standings ==
=== Individual classification ===
Rank	Name	Points
1	José Serpa (COL)	313.95
2	Gregorio Ladino (COL)	208.66
3	Andrei Sartassov (RUS)	202.66
4	Manuel Medina (VEN)	199.63
5	Pedro Pablo Pérez (CUB)	186
6	Greg Henderson (NZL)	180
7	Libardo Niño (COL)	171.66
8	Juan José Haedo (ARG)	167
9	Fausto Esparza (MEX)	160.66
10	Sergey Lagutin (UZB)	155

=== Team classification ===
Rank	Team	Points
1	Selle Italia–Diquigiovanni	689.44
2	Tecos	566.96
3	Ceramica Panaria–Navigare	390
4	Toyota–United Pro Cycling Team	307
5	Health Net–Maxxis	299
6	Symmetrics	199.62
7	TIAA–CREF	183
8	Chivas Cycling Team	151
9	Kodakgallery.com–Sierra Nevada	117
10	Perutnina Ptuj	87

=== Nation classification ===
Rank	Nation	Points
1	Colombia	1606.375
2	Brazil	1151
3	Argentina	808.265
4	Mexico	610.98
5	United States	606.46
6	Venezuela	570.25
7	Cuba	475
8	Canada	419.16
9	Costa Rica	366
10	Chile	291.3
