= 2006–07 UCI America Tour =

- Third edition of the UCI America Tour

Details
- Dates: 1 October 2006–15 September 2007
- Location: North America and South America
- Races: 36

Champions
- Individual champion: Svein Tuft (CAN) (Symmetrics)
- Teams' champion: Symmetrics
- Nations' champion: Colombia

The 2006–07 UCI America Tour was the third season for the UCI America Tour. The season began on 1 October 2006 with the Clásico Ciclístico Banfoandes and ended on 15 September 2007 with the Tour de Leelanau.

The points leader, based on the cumulative results of previous races, wears the UCI America Tour cycling jersey. José Serpa of Colombia was the defending champion of the 2005–06 UCI America Tour. Svein Tuft of Canada was crowned as the 2006–07 UCI America Tour champion.

Throughout the season, points are awarded to the top finishers of stages within stage races and the final general classification standings of each of the stages races and one-day events. The quality and complexity of a race also determines how many points are awarded to the top finishers, the higher the UCI rating of a race, the more points are awarded.

The UCI ratings from highest to lowest are as follows:

- Multi-day events: 2.HC, 2.1 and 2.2
- One-day events: 1.HC, 1.1 and 1.2

== Events ==
=== 2006 ===
Date	Race name	Location	UCI Rating	Winner	Team
1–8 October	Clásico Ciclístico Banfoandes	Venezuela	2.2	Hernán Buenahora (COL)	Gobernación del Zulia
10–15 October	Vuelta Chihuahua Internacional	Mexico	2.2	Luis Pérez (ESP)	Andalucía–Paul Versan
20 October–1 November	Vuelta a Guatemala	Guatemala	2.2	Juan Rojas (CRC)	Dos Pinos Costa Rica
7–12 November	Doble Copacabana GP Fides	Bolivia	2.2	Juan Diego Ramírez (COL)	Orbitel–EPM
14–24 November	Tour de Santa Catarina	Brazil	2.2	Pedro Nicacio (BRA)	Scott–Marcondes Cesar
19–29 December	Vuelta Ciclista a Costa Rica	Costa Rica	2.2	Henry Raabe (CRC)	BCR–Pizza Hut–KHS

=== 2007 ===
Date	Race name	Location	UCI Rating	Winner	Team
7–21 January	Vuelta al Táchira	Venezuela	2.2	Hernán Buenahora (COL)	Gobernación del Zulia
7 January	Copa América de Ciclismo	Brazil	1.2	Nilceu Santos (BRA)	Scott–Marcondes Cesar
23–28 January	Tour de San Luis	Argentina	2.2	Jorge Giacinti (ARG)	Team Lider Presto
13–25 February	Vuelta a Cuba	Cuba	2.2	Svein Tuft (CAN)	Symmetrics
18–25 February	Tour of California	United States	2.HC	Levi Leipheimer (USA)	Discovery Channel
15–25 March	Vuelta Ciclista Por Un Chile Lider	Chile	2.2	Andrei Sartassov (RUS)	Team Lider Presto
7 April	U.S. Cycling Open	United States	1.1	Svein Tuft (CAN)	Symmetrics
11–15 April	Volta do Rio de Janeiro	Brazil	2.2	Matías Médici (ARG)	Scott–Marcondes Cesar
16–22 April	Tour de Georgia	United States	2.HC	Janez Brajkovič (SLO)	Discovery Channel
22–29 April	Volta de Ciclismo Internacional do Estado de São Paulo	Brazil	2.2	Magno Nazaret (BRA)	Scott–Marcondes Cesar
28 April–5 May	Vuelta a El Salvador	El Salvador	2.2	Wilson Zambrano (COL)	Colombia es Pasión
5 May	Clasico Aniversario de la Federacion Venezolana de Ciclismo	Venezuela	1.2	José Aguilar (VEN)	Fundadeporte Carabobo
6 May	Clasico Corre Por La Vida, Dile NO a las Drogas	Venezuela	1.2	José Alarcón (VEN)	Kino Táchira Banfoandes
10–13 May	Doble Sucre Potosí G.P. Cemento Fancesa	Bolivia	2.2	Óscar Soliz (BOL)	Coordinadora de Boyacá Ebsa
16–20 May	Volta do Paraná	Brazil	2.2	Renato Seabra (BRA)	ClubeDatarodeCiclismo
25 May	Pan American Road and Track Championships – Road Race	Venezuela	CC	Martin Gilbert (CAN)	Canada (national team)
27 May	Pan American Road and Track Championships – Time Trial	Venezuela	CC	Libardo Niño (COL)	Colombia (national team)
3 June	Commerce Bank Lancaster Classic	United States	1.1	Bernhard Eisel (GER)	T-Mobile Team
7 June	Commerce Bank Reading Classic	United States	1.1	Bernhard Eisel (GER)	T-Mobile Team
10 June	Commerce Bank Philadelphia International Championship	United States	1.HC	Juan José Haedo (ARG)	Team CSC
12–16 June	Tour de Beauce	Canada	2.2	Ben Day (AUS)	Navigators Insurance
23 June	Rochester Twilight Criterium	United States	1.2	Hilton Clarke (AUS)	Navigators Insurance
24 June	Meeting Internacional de Goiânia	Brazil	1.2	Rafael Andriato (BRA)	Memorial-Fupes-Santos
8 July	Prova Ciclística 9 de Julho	Brazil	1.2	Rafael Andriato (BRA)	Memorial-Fupes-Santos
29–12 July	Vuelta a Colombia	Colombia	2.2	Santiago Botero (COL)	UNE–Orbitel
3–12 August	Tour de Guadeloupe	Mexico	2.2	Flober Peña (COL)	Union Cycliste Capesterre
27 August–9 September	Vuelta a Venezuela	Venezuela	2.2	César Salazar (COL)	Lotería del Táchira–Banfoandes
8 September	Univest Grand Prix	United States	1.2	William Frischkorn (USA)	Slipstream–Chipotle
11–16 September	Tour of Missouri	United States	2.1	George Hincapie (USA)	Discovery Channel
15 September	Tour de Leelanau	United States	1.2	Garrett Peltonen (USA)	Priority Health–Bissell

== Final standings ==
=== Individual classification ===
Rank	Name	Points
1	Svein Tuft (CAN)	234.66
2	Hernán Buenahora (COL)	194.66
3	Manuel Medina (VEN)	186.66
4	Alejandro Borrajo (ARG)	186
5	Nilceu Santos (BRA)	164.66
6	Rafael Andriato (BRA)	136
7	César Salazar (COL)	134.66
8	Santiago Botero (COL)	125
9	Anthony Brea (VEN)	119.66
10	Sergey Lagutin (UZB)	114

=== Team classification ===
Rank	Team	Points
1	Symmetrics	624.62
2	Scott–Marcondes Cesar	472.96
3	Tecos de la Universidad Autónoma de Guadalajara	384.62
4	Ceramica Panaria–Navigare	358
5	Slipstream–Chipotle	305
6	Diquigiovanni–Selle Italia	288.94
7	Memorial-Fupes-Santos	246
8	Health Net–Maxxis	226
9	Kelly Benefit Strategies–Medifast	211
10	UNE–Orbitel	205

=== Nation classification ===
Rank	Nation	Points
1	Colombia	1436.96
2	Argentina	1140.64
3	Canada	977.3
4	Brazil	888.98
5	Venezuela	724.98
6	United States	578
7	Mexico	460.64
8	Costa Rica	424
9	Cuba	373
10	Bolivia	311

=== Nation under-23 classification ===
Rank	Nation under-23	Points
1	Brazil	448.32
2	Canada	208.66
3	Venezuela	199.32
4	Argentina	154
5	Mexico	148
6	Bolivia	101
7	Colombia	97.66
8	Ecuador	76
9	Belize	72
10	United States	65
