= 2005 UCI America Tour =

Cyclist team

- First edition of the UCI America Tour

Details
- Dates: 8 January 2005–17 September 2005
- Location: North America and South America

Champions
- Individual champion: Edgardo Simón (ARG) (Colombia–Selle Italia)
- Teams' champion: Health Net–Maxxis
- Nations' champion: Brazil

The 2005 UCI America Tour was the first season for the UCI America Tour. The season began on 8 January 2005 with the Vuelta al Táchira and ended on 17 September 2005 with the Univest Grand Prix.

The points leader, based on the cumulative results of previous races, wears the UCI America Tour cycling jersey. Edgardo Simón of Argentina was crowned as the 2005 UCI America Tour champion.

Throughout the season, points are awarded to the top finishers of stages within stage races and the final general classification standings of each of the stages races and one-day events. The quality and complexity of a race also determines how many points are awarded to the top finishers, the higher the UCI rating of a race, the more points are awarded.

The UCI ratings from highest to lowest are as follows:

- Multi-day events: 2.HC, 2.1 and 2.2
- One-day events: 1.HC, 1.1 and 1.2

== Events ==
Date	Race name	Location	UCI Rating	Winner	Team
8–21 January	Vuelta al Táchira	Venezuela	2.2	José Rujano (VEN)	Colombia–Selle Italia
8 January	Copa América de Ciclismo	Brazil	1.2	Nilceu Santos (BRA)	Scott–Marcondes Cesar
16–23 January	Tour do Brasil Volta Ciclística de São Paulo	Brazil	2.2	Jorge Giacinti (ARG)	Memorial Santos
8–20 February	Vuelta a Cuba	Cuba	2.2	Damian Martinez (CUB)	Cuba (national team)
10–20 February	Vuelta Ciclística por un Chile Líder	Chile	2.2	Edgardo Simón (ARG)	Argentina (national team)
9–13 March	Volta Ciclística Internacional Porto Alegre	Brazil	2.2	Jorge Giacinti (ARG)	Memorial Santos
18–27 March	Vuelta Ciclista al Uruguay	Uruguay	2.2	Álvaro Tardáguila (URY)	Dolores CC
27 March–3 April	Vuelta a Chile	Chile	2.2	Edgardo Simón (ARG)	Lider
31 March–3 April	Redlands Classic	United States	2.2	Chris Wherry (USA)	Health Net–Maxxis
7–10 April	Tour of Puerto Rico	Puerto Rico	2.2	Wendy Cruz (DOM)	Selezione di Santiago
14–16 April	Sea Otter Classic	United States	2.2	Doug Ollerenshaw (USA)	Health Net–Maxxis
19–24 April	Tour de Georgia	United States	2.1	Tom Danielson (USA)	Discovery Channel
24–29 April	Vuelta Ciclista a El Salvador	El Salvador	2.2	Cameron Hughes (AUS)	Subway
25 April	Pan American Road and Track Championships – Time Trial	Brazil	CC	Edgardo Simón (ARG)	Argentina (national team)
30 April	Pan American Road and Track Championships – Road Race	Brazil	CC	John Parra (COL)	Colombia (national team)
12–15 May	Doble Sucre Potosí Grand Prix	Bolivia	2.2	Álvaro Sierra (COL)	Orbitel
25–29 May	Volta do Paraná	Brazil	2.2	Mauricio Morandi (BRA)	Scott–Marcondes Cesar
31 May	Wachovia Invitational	United States	1.1	Greg Henderson (NZL)	Health Net–Maxxis
2 June	Wachovia Classic	United States	1.1	Gordon Fraser (CAN)	Health Net–Maxxis
5 June	Wachovia USPRO Championship	United States	1.HC	Chris Wherry (USA)	Health Net–Maxxis
14–19 June	Tour de Beauce	Canada	2.2	Nathan O'Neill (AUS)	Ceramica Panaria–Navigare
8–17 July	Tour de Martinique	France	2.2	Frédéric Delalande (FRA)	
9 July	Prova Ciclística 9 de Julho	Brazil	1.2	Roberson Figueiredo (BRA)	Scott–Marcondes Cesar
24 July–7 August	Vuelta a Colombia	Colombia	2.2	Libardo Niño (COL)	Lotería de Boyacá
5–14 August	Tour de Guadeloupe	France	2.2	Flober Peña (COL)	
22 August	USPRO National Criterium Championships	United States	1.1	Tyler Farrar (CAN)	Health Net–Maxxis
28 August–7 September	Volta Ciclística Internacional de Santa Catarina	Brazil	2.2	Márcio May (BRA)	Scott–Marcondes Cesar
29 August–11 September	Vuelta a Venezuela	Venezuela	2.2	José Chacón Díaz (VEN)	
4 September	T Mobile International	United States	1.HC	Fabian Wegmann (GER)	Team Gerolsteiner
17 September	Univest Grand Prix	United States	1.2	Melito Heredia (DOM)	GS Gotham-Toga

== Final standings ==
=== Individual classification ===
Rank	Name	Points
1	Edgardo Simón (ARG)	238
2	Damian Martinez (CUB)	188
3	Chris Wherry (USA)	185
4	Walter Pedraza (COL)	161
5	Nilceu Santos (BRA)	152
6	Roberson Figueiredo (BRA)	140
7	François Parisien (CAN)	140
8	Gordon Fraser (CAN)	138
9	Márcio May (BRA)	136
10	José Chacón Díaz (VEN)	135

=== Team classification ===
Rank	Team	Points
1	Health Net–Maxxis	766
2	Colombia–Selle Italia	438
3	Symmetrics	220
4	Jelly Belly–Pool Gel	200
5	Ceramica Panaria–Navigare	194
6	Kodak-Sierra Nevada	143
7	Naturino–Sapore di Mare	120
8	Webcor Builders	104
9	Express Racing	81
10	Colavita–Sutter Home	78

=== Nation classification ===
Rank	Nation	Points
1	Brazil	1458
2	Argentina	1356
3	Colombia	1162
4	United States	1001
5	Venezuela	841
6	Canada	832
7	Cuba	612
8	Chile	496
9	Mexico	404
10	Peru	240
