= 2007–08 UCI America Tour =

- Fourth edition of the UCI America Tour

Details
- Dates: 7 October 2007–20 September 2008
- Location: North America and South America
- Races: 39

Champions
- Individual champion: Manuel Medina (VEN) (Gobernación del Zulia)
- Teams' champion: Garmin–Chipotle
- Nations' champion: United States

The 2007–08 UCI America Tour was the fourth season for the UCI America Tour. The season began on 7 October 2007 with the Clásico Ciclístico Banfoandes and ended on 20 September 2008 with the Vuelta Mexico.

The points leader, based on the cumulative results of previous races, wears the UCI America Tour cycling jersey. Svein Tuft of Canada was the defending champion of the 2006–07 UCI America Tour. Manuel Medina of Venezuela was crowned as the 2007–08 UCI America Tour champion.

Throughout the season, points are awarded to the top finishers of stages within stage races and the final general classification standings of each of the stages races and one-day events. The quality and complexity of a race also determines how many points are awarded to the top finishers, the higher the UCI rating of a race, the more points are awarded.

The UCI ratings from highest to lowest are as follows:

- Multi-day events: 2.HC, 2.1 and 2.2
- One-day events: 1.HC, 1.1 and 1.2

== Events ==
=== 2007 ===
Date	Race name	Location	UCI Rating	Winner	Team
7–14 October	Clásico Ciclístico Banfoandes	Venezuela	2.2	Sergio Luis Henao (COL)	Colombia és Pasión Coldeportes
7–14 October	Vuelta Chihuahua Internacional	Mexico	2.2	Francisco Mancebo (ESP)	Relax–GAM
20 October–1 November	Vuelta a Guatemala	Guatemala	2.2	Carlos López (MEX)	Canel's-Turbo-Mayordomo
6–11 November	Doble Copacabana GP Fides	Bolivia	2.2	Óscar Soliz (BOL)	Coordinadora EBSA
15–25 November	Tour de Santa Catarina	Brazil	2.2	Alex Diniz (BRA)	Scott–Marcondes Cesar–São José dos Campos
17–25 November	Vuelta a Ecuador	Ecuador	2.2	Alex Atapuma (COL)	Indernariño
14–28 December	Vuelta Ciclista a Costa Rica	Costa Rica	2.2	Henry Raabe (CRC)	BCR–Pizza Hut

=== 2008 ===
Date	Race name	Location	UCI Rating	Winner	Team
5–18 January	Vuelta al Táchira	Venezuela	2.2	Manuel Medina (VEN)	Gobernación del Zulia
6 January	Copa América de Ciclismo	Brazil	1.2	Nilceu Santos (BRA)	Scott–Marcondes Cesar–São José dos Campos
22–27 January	Tour de San Luis	Argentina	2.2	Martín Garrido (ARG)	Palmeiras Resort–Tavira
5–17 February	Vuelta a Cuba	Cuba	2.2	Pedro Pablo Pérez (CUB)	Cuba (national team)
13–17 February	Tour of Belize	Belize	2.2	Carlos Oyarzun (CHI)	Tecos-Trek
17–24 February	Tour of California	United States	2.HC	Levi Leipheimer (USA)	Astana
23 February–2 March	Vuelta a la Independencia Nacional	Dominican Republic	2.2	Carlos José Ochoa (VEN)	Venezuela (national team)
20–27 April	Volta de São Paulo	Brazil	2.2	Gregolry Panizo (BRA)	Clube DataRo de Ciclismo
21–27 April	Tour de Georgia	United States	2.HC	Kanstantsin Sivtsov (BLR)	Team High Road
3 May	Clasico Aniversario de la Federacion Venezolana de Ciclismo	Venezuela	1.2	José Aguilar (VEN)	Gobierno Bolivariano de Carabobo
4 May	Copa Federación Venezolana de Ciclismo	Venezuela	1.2	Artur García (VEN)	Lotería del Táchira
4 May	U.S. Air Force Cycling Classic	United States	1.2	Lucas Sebastián Haedo (ARG)	Colavita–Sutter Home
9 May	Pan American Cycling Championships – Time Trial	Uruguay	CC	Svein Tuft (CAN)	Canada (national team)
10–25 May	Vuelta a Colombia	Colombia	2.2	Giovanny Báez (COL)	UNE–Orbitel
11 May	Pan American Cycling Championships – Road Race	Uruguay	CC	Richard Mascarañas (URU)	Uruguay (national team)
14–18 May	Doble Sucre Potosí G.P. Cemento Fancesa	Bolivia	2.2	Byron Guamá (ECU)	Equipo Spoli Ecuador
25 May	Tour de Leelanau	United States	1.2	Taylor Tolleson (USA)	BMC Racing Team
3 June	Lancaster Classic	United States	1.1	Yuri Metlushenko (UKR)	Amore & Vita–McDonald's
5 June	Coupe des nations Ville Saguenay	Canada	2.Ncup	Thomas Kvist (DEN)	Denmark (national team)
7 June	Reading Classic	United States	1.1	Óscar Sevilla (ESP)	Rock Racing
8 June	Philadelphia International Championship	United States	1.HC	Matti Breschel (DEN)	Team CSC
10–15 June	Tour de Beauce	Canada	2.2	Svein Tuft (CAN)	Symmetrics Cycling Team
24–29 June	Tour of Pennsylvania	United States	2.2	David Veilleux (CAN)	Kelly Benefit Strategies
4–13 July	Tour de Martinique	France	2.2	Willy Roseau (FRA)	Club Martinique
9 July	Prova Ciclística 9 de Julho	Brazil	1.2	Michel Fernández (CUB)	
20 July	Clasico Ciudad de Caracas	Venezuela	1.2	Gil Cordovés (CUB)	Alcaldía de Cabimas BOD
1–10 August	Tour de Guadeloupe	France	2.2	Flobert Pena Pena (COL)	Union Cycliste Capesterrienne
8–10 August	Rochester Omnium	United States	2.2	Dominique Rollin (USA)	Toyota United
25 August–7 September	Vuelta a Venezuela	Venezuela	2.2	Carlos Ochoa (VEN)	Serramenti PVC Diquigiovanni–Androni Giocattoli
6 September	Univest Grand Prix	United States	1.2	Lucas Euser (USA)	Team Garmin–Chipotle
8–14 September	Tour of Missouri	United States	2.1	Christian Vande Velde (USA)	Team Garmin–Chipotle
13–20 September	Vuelta Mexico	Mexico	2.2	Glen Chadwick (NZL)	Team Type 1

== Final standings ==
=== Individual classification ===
Rank	Name	Points
1	Manuel Medina (VEN)	232
2	Svein Tuft (CAN)	219
3	Christian Vande Velde (USA)	211
4	Carlos José Ochoa (VEN)	198
5	Pedro Pablo Pérez (CUB)	180
6	Henry Raabe (CRC)	162
7	Gil Cordovés (CUB)	153
8	Artur García (VEN)	146
9	Óscar Sevilla (ESP)	131
10	Byron Guamá (COL)	128

=== Team classification ===
Rank	Team	Points
1	Garmin–Chipotle	677
2	Symmetrics	531.7
3	Tecos de la Universidad	379.8
4	Rock Racing	349
5	Canel's Turbo Mayordomo	343
6	Diquigiovanni–Androni	293
7	Colombia es Pasión	263
8	Kelly Benefit Strategies–Medifast	230
9	Toyota–United	229.5
10	Scott–Marcondes Cesar	206

=== Nation classification ===
Rank	Nation	Points
1	United States	1180.4
2	Venezuela	1111
3	Argentina	928.6
4	Colombia	846.4
5	Canada	793.2
6	Cuba	667
7	Mexico	594
8	Costa Rica	375
9	Brazil	298
10	Ecuador	294

=== Nation under-23 classification ===
Rank	Nation under-23	Points
1	United States	230.9
2	Colombia	203
3	Canada	116.3
4	Venezuela	107
5	Cuba	88
6	Costa Rica	81
7	Brazil	69
8	Argentina	62
9	Mexico	24.5
10	Ecuador	18

== See also ==
- Montréal–Boston Tour
