= Copa da Republica de Ciclismo =

Race details
- Date: December
- Region: Brazil
- Discipline: Road
- Type: One-day race
- Web site: www.copadarepublicadeciclismo.com.br

History
- First edition: 2002
- Editions: 9
- First winner: Rodrigo Brito (BRA)
- Most wins: Rodrigo Brito (BRA) (3)
- Most recent: Francisco Chamorro (ARG)

The Copa da Republica de Ciclismo is a single day road cycling race held in Brazil. It exists as both a men's and a women's competition. The women's race, however, did not occur in the first and fifth editions. The first edition of the race was held in 2002 at the Aterro do Flamengo in Rio de Janeiro. From the second edition (held in 2003) to the fifth (held in January 2007), the race took place at the Monumental Axis of Brasília. The sixth edition took place on the streets of Belo Horizonte in December 2007. The seventh edition returned to Aterro do Flamengo in Rio de Janeiro.

== Past winners ==
Edition	Month/Year	Men's Winner	Women's Winner
I	Nov/2002	(Brazil) Rodrigo Brito	No race
II	Nov/2003	(Brazil) Rodrigo Brito	(Brazil) Clemilda Fernandes
III	Dec/2004	(Brazil) Renato Ruiz	(Brazil) Janildes Fernandes
IV	Dec/2005	(Brazil) Rodrigo Brito	(Brazil) Uênia Fernandes
V	Jan/2007	(Argentina) Francisco Chamorro	No race
VI	Dec/2007	(Brazil) Nilceu Santos	(Brazil) Márcia Fernandes Silva
VII	Dec/2008	(Brazil) Roberto Pinheiro	(Brazil) Janildes Fernandes
VIII	Dec/2009	(Brazil) Nilceu Santos	
IX	Dec/2010	(Argentina) Francisco Chamorro	
