= 2008 Copa América de Ciclismo =

2007–2008 UCI America Tour
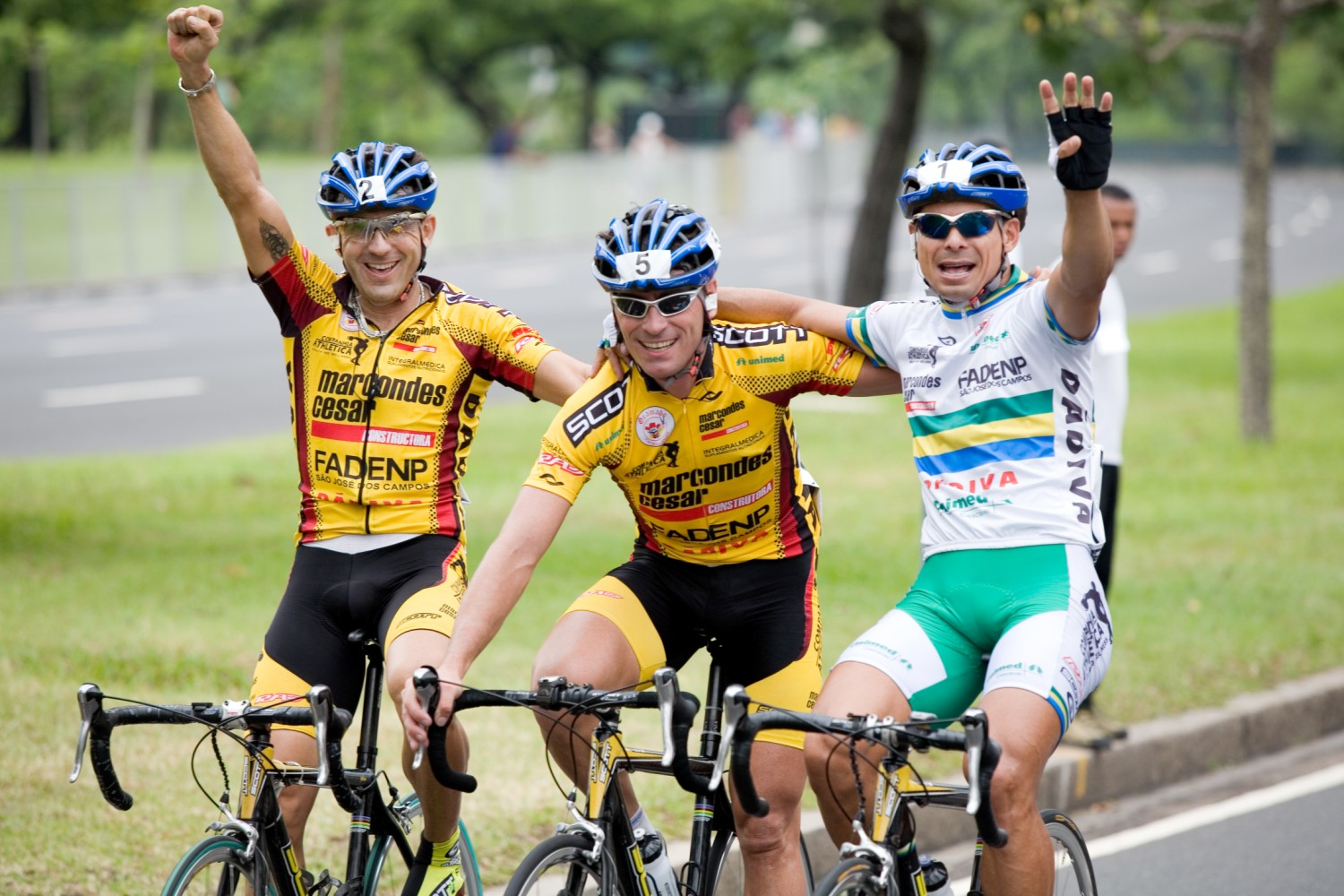
- Daniel Rogelim, Márcio May and Nilceu Santos

Race details
- Dates: January 6, 2008
- Stages: 1
- Distance: 38.4 km (23.86 mi)
- Winning time: 00h 48' 42"

Results
	Winner	Nilceu Santos (BRA)
	Second	Francisco Chamorro (ARG)
	Third	Fabielle Mota (BRA)

The eighth edition of the Copa América de Ciclismo was held on January 6, 2008. The 2008 edition was not staged in São Paulo, Brazil, but in a street circuit around Flamengo Park, in Rio de Janeiro.

== Results ==
Place	Men's Competition		Women's Competition	
Place	Name	Time	Name	Time
1.	Nilceu Santos (BRA)	00:48.42	Uênia Fernandes (BRA)	00:35.42
2.	Francisco Chamorro (ARG)		Fernanda da Silva (BRA)	+0.07
3.	Fabielle Mota (BRA)		Clemilda Fernandes (BRA)	
4.	Andrey Ortiz (BRA)		Janildes Fernandes (BRA)	
5.	Kléber Ramos (BRA)		Natalia Lima (BRA)	
6.	Bruno Tabanez (BRA)		Debora Gerhard (BRA)	
7.	Daniel Rogelim (BRA)		Consuelo Rodríguez (CHI)	
8.	Cleber Santos (BRA)		Daniela Lionço (BRA)	
9.	Michel Garcia (BRA)		Loraine Tibuski (BRA)	
10.	Marcos Crespo (ARG)		Rosane Kirch (BRA)	
