= 2002 Copa América de Ciclismo =

Race details
- Dates: January 6, 2002
- Stages: 1
- Distance: 42 km (26.10 mi)
- Winning time: 00h 53' 38"

Results
	Winner	John Lieswyn (USA)
	Second	Gregorio Bare (URU)
	Third	Nilceu Santos (BRA)

The second edition of the Copa América de Ciclismo was held on Sunday, January 6, 2002, in São Paulo, Brazil. The Copa América opened the Brazilian season and took place on the Formula One-track in the city of São Paulo-Interlagos, a circuit of 4.3 km (2.7 mi).

== Results ==
Place	Men's Competition	
Place	Name	Time
1.	John Lieswyn (USA)	00:53.38
2.	Gregorio Bare (URU)	+0.01
3.	Nilceu Santos (BRA)	
4.	Ángel Colla (ARG)	
5.	Ivan Dominguez (USA)	
6.	Daniel Valter Rogelim (BRA)	+0.02
7.	Luciano Pagliarini (BRA)	
8.	Pedro Elivelton (BRA)	
9.	Francisco Belo (BRA)	
10.	José Reginaldo Cardoso (BRA)	+0.03
