= 2009 Copa América de Ciclismo =

Race details
- Dates: January 4, 2009
- Stages: 1
- Distance: 62.464 km (38.81 mi)
- Winning time: 01h 39' 20"

Results
	Winner	Francisco Chamorro (ARG)
	Second	Nilceu Santos (BRA)
	Third	Michel García (CUB)

The ninth edition of the Copa América de Ciclismo was held on 2009-01-04 in São Paulo, Brazil. The Copa América opened the Brazilian season and took place at the Formula One-track, a circuit of 4.3 km (2.7 mi), in the city of São Paulo-Interlagos.

== Results ==
Place	Men's Competition		Women's Competition	
Place	Name	Time	Name	Time
1.	Francisco Chamorro (ARG)	01:39.20	Janildes Fernandes (BRA)	00:51.23
2.	Nilceu Santos (BRA)	+0.01	Natália Lima (BRA)	+0.48
3.	Michel García (CUB)		Luciene da Silva (BRA)	
4.	Roberto Pinheiro (BRA)		Débora Gerhard (BRA)	
5.	Raphael Serpa (BRA)		Márcia Fernandes (BRA)	+0.49
6.	Marcos Crespo (ARG)		Paola Muñoz (CHI)	
7.	Richard Mascarañas (URU)		Cristiane da Silva (BRA)	
8.	Fabielle Mota (BRA)		Clemilda Fernandes (BRA)	+0.50
9.	Luis Mansilla (CHI)		Rosane Kirch (BRA)	
10.	Alcides Vieira (BRA)		Fernanda da Silva (BRA)	+0.51
