= ACS Cycling Chirio–Casa Giani =

Team information
- UCI code: USC (2001–2010); FCL (2011–2012); FDA (2013–2014); TCF (2015–2017); CHI (2018–)
- Registered: Italy (2001–2012); Lithuania (2013–2014); Italy (2015–)
- Founded: 2001
- Discipline: Road
- Status: UCI Women's Team (2001–2014); National (2015–)

Key personnel
- General manager: Franco Chirio

Team name history
- 2001 2002–2009 2010 2011 2012 2013 2014 2015 2016 2017 2018–: USC Chirio; USC Chirio Forno d'Asolo; ACS Chirio–Forno d'Asolo; Colavita Forno d'Asolo; Forno d'Asolo Colavita; Chirio Forno d'Asolo; Forno d'Asolo–Astute; Tre Colli–Forno d'Asolo; Chirio–Tre Colli–Casa Giani; Tre Colli–Chioro–Casa Giani; ACS Cycling Chirio–Casa Giani

ACS Cycling Chirio–Casa Giani (UCI Code: CHI) is a professional cycling team based in Montechiaro d'Asti in Italy. It competes in road bicycle racing events, including in some UCI Women's Road World Cup events.

== Team history ==
On October 17, 2014, Daiva Tušlaitė left the team to join ASD Giusfredi Ciclismo. On November 19, Rossella Callovi left the team to join Top Girls Fassa Bortolo. On December 2 Íngrid Drexel and Jessenia Meneses left the team to join Astana–Acca Due O.

Team founder and former manager Franco Chirio died on 22 April 2024 aged 71.

== Major wins ==
2002
GP Carnevale d'Europa (F): Zoulfia Zabirova
Chrono Champenois — Trophée Européen (F): Zoulfia Zabirova
Stage 2 Giro della Toscana Int. Femminile (F): Zinaida Stahurskaya
Stage 4 Giro della Toscana Int. Femminile (F): Zoulfia Zabirova
2003
Stage 1 Vuelta Castilla y Leon (F): Regina Schleicher
Trofeo Riviera Della Versilia (F): Zinaida Stahurskaya
GP Carnevale d'Europa (F): Regina Schleicher
2004
Stage 4 Emakumeen Euskal Bira (F): Jolanta Polikevičiūtė
Stage 3 Trophée d'Or Féminin (F): Clemilda Fernandes Silva
2005

Giro del Lago Maggiore — GP Knorr (F): Giorgia Bronzini

Giro del Friuli Donne (F): Giorgia Bronzini
Stages 1 & 3 Giro del Trentino Alto Adige — Südtirol (F): Giorgia Bronzini
Stages 3, 6 & 9 Giro d'Italia Donne (F): Giorgia Bronzini
Rund um die Nürnberger Altstadt (F): Giorgia Bronzini
Stage 3 part a Giro della Toscana Int. Femminile (F): Giorgia Bronzini
Stage 3 part b Giro della Toscana Int. Femminile (F): Clemilda Fernandes Silva
Chrono Champenois — Trophée Européen (F): Kathryn (Kathy) Watt
Stage 5 Giro della Toscana Int. Femminile (F): Giorgia Bronzini
2006
Copa América de Ciclismo (F): Clemilda Fernandes Silva
Sydney, Points race (F): Vera Carrara
Stage 5 Holland Ladies Tour (F): Vera Carrara
2007
Stage 1 Vuelta Ciclista Femenina a el Salvador (F): Tetyana Styazhkina
Vuelta a El Salvador Stage 3b – Uênia Fernandes
Vuelta al Quindío (F): Laura Camila Lozano Ramirez
Copa América de Ciclismo (F): Clemilda Fernandes Silva
GP De Santa Ana (F): Tetyana Styazhkina
GP Rund um Visp (F): Min Hye Lee
Giro del Valdarno (F): Clemilda Fernandes Silva
2008
Copa América de Ciclismo, Uênia Fernandes de Souza
Lyon Vaise, Jolanta Polikevičiūtė
Pélussin, Alyona Andruk
Overall Vuelta a El Salvador, Tetyana Styazhkina

Stage 3, Janildes Fernandes
Stage 4, Tetyana Styazhkina

Lyon Gerland, Urtė Juodvalkytė
Reyrieux, Evelyn García
Stage 6 Grande Boucle, Rasa Polikevičiūtė
Stage 4 Route de France Féminine, Urtė Juodvalkytė

2009
Copa América de Ciclismo, Janildes Fernandes Silva

2011
GP Liberazione, Giorgia Bronzini
Liberty Classic, Giorgia Bronzini
Grand Prix Cycliste de Gatineau, Giorgia Bronzini

2013
Stages 3 & 7 Vuelta a El Salvador, Clemilda Fernandes Silva
Stage 6 Vuelta a El Salvador, Uênia Fernandes de Souza
Grand Prix GSB, Clemilda Fernandes Silva
Tour of Chongming Island World Cup, Tetyana Ryabchenko

== National, continental and world champions ==
2002
Russia Time Trial, Zoulfia Zabirova
2005
European U23 Track, (Pursuit), Tatsiana Sharakova
Brazil Road Race, Clemilda Fernandes Silva
Belarus Road Race, Tatsiana Sharakova
Japan Road Race, Miho Oki
2006
Italy Cyclo-cross, Annabella Stropparo
Argentina Road Race, Valeria Romina Pintos
World Track (Points race), Vera Carrara
European U23 Track, Tatsiana Sharakova
2007
Pan American Track (Team Sprint), Karelia Judith Machado Jaimes
Brazil Time Trial, Janildes Fernandes Silva
Czech National Time Trial, Tereza Huřiková
2008
Brazil Road Race, Clemilda Fernandes Silva
Ukraine Time Trial, Tetyana Styazhkina
Ukraine Road, Tetyana Styazhkina
2009
Brazil Road Race, Clemilda Fernandes Silva
2010
Brazil Road Race, Janildes Fernandes Silva
2011
World Road Race, Giorgia Bronzini
New Zealand Road Race, Catherine Cheatley
2012
Brazil Time Trial, Uênia Fernandes de Souza
Lithuania Road Race, Svetlana Pauliukaitė
2013
Brazil Time Trial, Clemilda Fernandes Silva
2014
Lithuania Road Race, Edita Janeliūnaitė
Lithuania Time Trial, Daiva Tušlaitė
Belarus Road Race, Elenka Sitsko
2015
Colombia Road Race, Leidy Natalia Muñoz
Estonia Road Race, Liisa Ehrberg

== Previous team rosters ==
=== 2011 ===
Ages as of 1 January 2011.

Rider	Date of birth
Ester Alves (POR)	July 22, 1981 (aged 29)
Emilie Blanquefort (FRA)	May 6, 1988 (aged 22)
Mireia Epelde Bikendi (ESP)	October 29, 1985 (aged 25)
Arantxa Garcia Morte (ESP)	August 16, 1990 (aged 20)
Leticia Gil Parra (ESP)	August 1, 1982 (aged 28)

Rider	Date of birth
Lucía González Blanco (ESP)	July 9, 1990 (aged 20)
Eneritz Iturriagaechevarria Mazaga (ESP)	September 17, 1980 (aged 30)
Belén López Morales (ESP)	April 18, 1984 (aged 26)
Fanny Riberot (FRA)	March 17, 1983 (aged 27)
Anne-Marie Schmitt (LUX)	January 23, 1989 (aged 21)

=== 2009 ===
- Silvia Borile (ITA)
- Marina Chirio (ITA)
- Clemilda Fernandes (BRA)
- Janildes Fernandes (BRA)
- Márcia Fernandes (BRA)
- Uênia Fernandes (BRA)
- Simona Frapporti (ITA)
- Edita Janeliūnaitė (LTU)
- Christina Kollman (AUT)
- Adriana Lovera (VEN)
- Karelia Machado (VEN)
- Laura Marotta (ITA)
- Martina Nota (ITA)
- Jolanta Polikevičiūtė (LTU)
- Eleonora Spaliviero (ITA)
- Daiva Tušlaitė (LTU)
- Edita Ungurytė (LTU)
- Eglė Zablockytė (LTU)

=== 2008 ===
- Alyona Andruk (UKR)
- Silvia Borile (ITA)
- Uênia Fernandes (BRA)
- Clemilda Fernandes (BRA)
- Janildes Fernandes (BRA)
- Evelyn García (ESA)
- Tereza Huříková (CZE)
- Urtė Juodvalkytė (LTU)
- Camila Lozano (COL)
- Laura Marotta (ITA)
- Monica Méndez (COL)
- Jolanta Polikevičiūtė (LTU)
- Rasa Polikevičiūtė (LTU)
- Samantha Profumo (ITA)
- Katy Redolini (ITA)
- Elisa Rizzi (ITA)
- Tetyana Styazhkina (UKR)
- Elena Stramoysova (RUS)
- Hanna Talkanitsa (BLR)
- Edita Ungurytė (LTU)
