= Antônio Nascimento =

Brazilian cyclist

Personal information
- Full name: Antônio Roberto Xavier Nascimento
- Born: August 19, 1977 (age 49) Brazil

Cycling career
- Sport: Cycling
- Discipline: Road
- Role: Rider

Amateur teams
- 2009: GRCE Memorial
- 2010: Clube DataRo de Ciclismo
- 2014: Brasilinvest–Suzano
- 2014–2016: Osasco–Penks
- 2017: Team SBC Audax–Sao Bernardo
- 2021: Avulso

Professional teams
- 2007: Memorial-Fupes-Santos
- 2011–2013: Funvic–Pindamonhangaba

Antônio Roberto Xavier Nascimento (born August 19, 1977) is a Brazilian cyclist.

== Major results ==
2001
10th Copa América de Ciclismo
2002
Tour de Santa Catarina

1st Stages 2 & 4

2nd Prova Ciclística 9 de Julho
2003
1st Overall Tour de Santa Catarina

1st Mountains classification
1st Stage 1

2004
1st Overall Tour do Brasil

1st Mountains classification

2nd Overall Tour de Santa Catarina

1st Stage 6

6th Copa América de Ciclismo
10th Overall Volta de Porto Alegre
2005
1st Stage 5 Tour de Santa Catarina
2nd Overall Volta do Paraná

1st Stage 2

2006
1st Stage 7 Tour de Santa Catarina
1st Mountains classification Volta de Ciclismo Internacional do Estado de São Paulo
3rd Prova Ciclística 9 de Julho
2009
1st Stage 3 Volta do Paraná
2nd Overall Tour de Santa Catarina
2010
3rd Overall Volta Ciclística Internacional do Rio Grande do Sul

1st Mountains classification

5th Overall Tour do Brasil

1st Stage 9

8th Overall Giro do Interior de São Paulo

1st Stage 1

2011
3rd Overall Volta Ciclística Internacional do Rio Grande do Sul

1st Stage 2

5th Overall Tour do Rio
8th Overall Tour do Brasil

1st Stage 1

2015
8th Overall Volta do Paraná
