= 2003 Copa América de Ciclismo =

Copa América de Ciclismo
Race details
- Dates: January 5, 2003
- Stages: 1
- Distance: 44 km (27.34 mi)
- Winning time: 1h 02' 12"

Results
| | Winner | Renato Rohsler (BRA) |
| | Second | Matthew Decanio (USA) |
| | Third | André Grizante (BRA) |

The third edition of the Copa América de Ciclismo was held on 5 January 2003 in São Paulo, Brazil.

== Results ==
| Place | Men's Competition | | Women's Competition | |
| Place | Name | Time | Name | Time |
|---|---|---|---|---|
| 1. | Renato Rohsler (BRA) | 01:02.12 | Janildes Fernandes (BRA) | 00:36.46 |
| 2. | Matthew Decanio (USA) | +0:01 | Clemilda Fernandes (BRA) | |
| 3. | André Grizante (BRA) | +0:11 | Maria Lucilene Alves (BRA) | +0:03 |
| 4. | Breno França (BRA) | +0:13 | Débora Gerhard (BRA) | +0:50 |
| 5. | Pedro Romeiro (BRA) | +0:15 | Carla Camargo (BRA) | |
| 6. | Gaston Corsaro (ARG) | | Daniela Peres (BRA) | +0:52 |
| 7. | Antonio Roberto Xavier (BRA) | +0:16 | Patricia Moreira (BRA) | +0:53 |
| 8. | Patrique Azevedo (BRA) | +0:17 | Vera Consentino (BRA) | +0:54 |
| 9. | Sidnei dos Santos (BRA) | | Uênia Fernandes (BRA) | +1:02 |
| 10. | Robson Batista Vieira (BRA) | | Maria Bello (BRA) | +2:40 |
