= 2006 Copa América de Ciclismo =

Copa América de Ciclismo
2005–2006 UCI America Tour

Race details
- Dates: January 8, 2006
- Stages: 1
- Distance: 34.472 km (21.42 mi)
- Winning time: 0h 45' 25"

Results
	Winner	Nilceu Santos (BRA)
	Second	Rodrigo Brito (BRA)
	Third	Héctor Figueiras (BRA)

The sixth edition of the Copa América de Ciclismo was held on 8 January 2006 in São Paulo, Brazil. Nilceu Santos (Scott) repeated his 2005 victory, beating Rodrigo Brito (São Caetano) and Héctor Figueiras (São Caetano) in a bunch sprint.

== Results ==
Place	Men's Competition		Women's Competition	
Place	Name	Time	Name	Time
1.	Nilceu Santos (BRA)	00:45.25	Clemilda Fernandes (BRA)	00:35.47
2.	Rodrigo Brito (BRA)		Rosane Kirch (BRA)	
3.	Héctor Figueiras (BRA)		Carla Camargo (BRA)	
4.	Roberson Figueiredo (BRA)		Karelia Machado (BRA)	
5.	Fabielle Mota (BRA)		Janildes Fernandes (BRA)	
6.	Willian Alves (BRA)		Debora Gerhard (BRA)	
7.	Juan Francisco Cabrera (USA)		Valeria Pinto (ARG)	
8.	Armando Camargo Filho (BRA)		Maria Bello (BRA)	
9.	Carlos De Franca (BRA)		Uênia Fernandes (BRA)	
10.	Francisco Paiva (BRA)		Valquiria Pardial (BRA)	
