= 2007 Copa América de Ciclismo =

Copa América de Ciclismo
2006–2007 UCI America Tour

Race details
- Dates: 7 January 2007
- Stages: 1
- Distance: 68.672 km (42.67 mi)
- Winning time: 1h 39' 19"

Results
	Winner	Nilceu Santos (BRA)
	Second	Francisco Chamorro (ARG)
	Third	Raphael Serpa (BRA)

The seventh edition of the Copa América de Ciclismo was held on 7 January 2007 in São Paulo, Brazil. The Copa América opened the Brazilian season and took place at the Formula One-track, a circuit of 4.3 km (2.7 mi), in the city of São Paulo-Interlagos.

== Results ==
Place	Men's competition		Women's competition	
Place	Name	Time	Name	Time
1.	Nilceu Santos (BRA)	01:39.19	Clemilda Fernandes (BRA)	00:38.02
2.	Francisco Chamorro (ARG)		Debora Gerhard (BRA)	
3.	Raphael Serpa (BRA)		Rosane Kirch (BRA)	
4.	Fabielle Mota (BRA)		Uênia Souza (BRA)	
5.	Anibal Borrajo (ARG)		Luciene da Silva (BRA)	
6.	Diego Muller (BRA)		Ana Ayub (BRA)	
7.	Rafael Andriato (BRA)		Julie Ciancio (BRA)	+0.08
8.	André Pulini (BRA)		Natalia Lima (BRA)	+0.16
9.	Bruno Tabanez (BRA)		Jerusa Rossi (BRA)	+0.30
10.	Kleber Silva (BRA)		Maria Bello (BRA)	+0.47
