= Francisco Chamorro =

Argentine cyclist

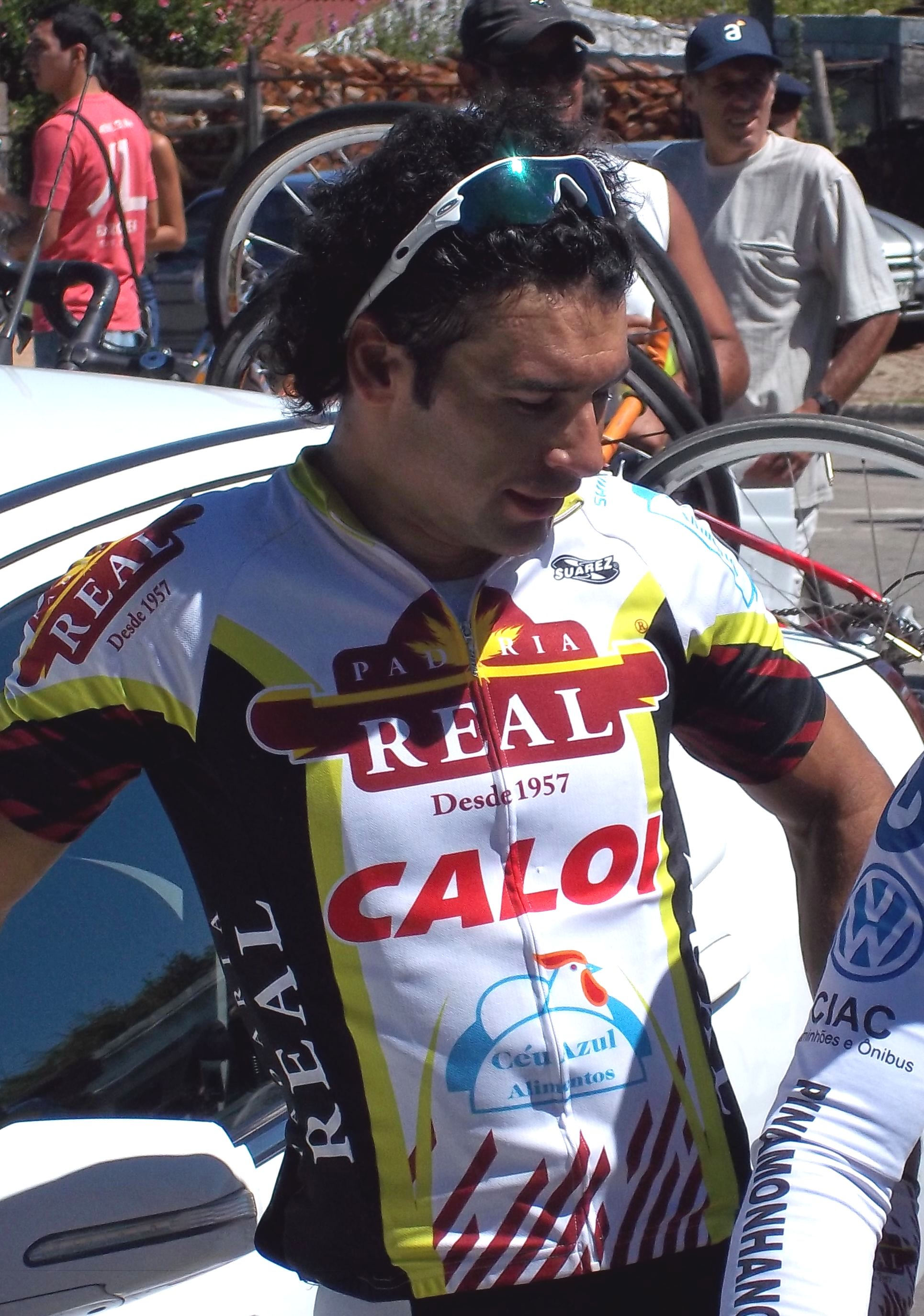
- Chamorro at the 2012 Rutas de America.

Personal information
- Full name: Francisco Ramon Chamorro Piva
- Born: 7 August 1981 (age 45) La Plata, Argentina

Cycling career
- Sport: Cycling
- Current team: Unifunvic Pindamondangadaba
- Discipline: Road
- Role: Rider
- Rider type: All-rounder

Amateur teams
- 2011: Clube de Ciclismo de S.J. Campos-Cannondale
- 2018: Funvic/Soul Brasil Pro Cycling
- 2020–2021: Memorial Santos Fupes
- 2022–: Unifunvic Pindamondangadaba

Professional teams
- 2002–2003: Caloi–Suzano–PoweBar
- 2005–2008: CESC–Sundown–São Caetano do Sul
- 2009–2010: Scott–Marcondes Cesar–São José dos Campos
- 2012: Real Cycling Team
- 2013–2017: Funvic Brasilinvest–São José dos Campos

Major wins
- Copa América de Ciclismo (2009, 2012, 2013)

Francisco Ramon Chamorro Piva (born 7 August 1981) is an Argentine professional racing cyclist, who currently rides for Brazilian amateur team Unifunvic Pindamondangadaba. He competed at the 2016 UCI Road World Championships in the road race, but he failed to finish.

== Major results ==
2003
1st GP São Paulo
2006
1st Volta Do ABC Paulista
1st Stage 1b Volta de Goias
10th Copa América de Ciclismo
2007
1st Copa da Republica de Ciclismo
1st GP São Paulo
Vuelta del Uruguay

1st Stages 1 & 10

2nd Copa América de Ciclismo
3rd Prova Ciclística 9 de Julho
2008
1st Volta Do ABC Paulista
1st Stage 7 Volta de São Paulo
2nd Copa América de Ciclismo
2009
1st Overall Doble San Francisco-Miramar

1st Stages 1 & 2

1st Copa América de Ciclismo
1st Copa Hilário Diegues
1st GP Tiradentes
Torneio de Verão

1st Stages 1 & 4

1st Stage 2 Volta Gasol
3rd Prova Ciclística 9 de Julho
8th Overall Rutas de América

1st Stages 3 & 5a

2010
1st Prova Ciclística 1° de Maio
1st Giro Memorial Atribuna
1st Prova Ciclística 9 de Julho
1st Copa da Republica de Ciclismo
1st Stage 5 Volta de São Paulo
1st Stage 1 Doble San Francisco-Miramar
2011
1st Prova TV Atalai
1st GP São Paulo
1st Copa da Republica de Ciclismo
2012
1st Copa América de Ciclismo
Rutas de América

1st Stages 3 & 4a

Tour do Brasil

1st Stages 1 & 8

2013
1st Copa América de Ciclismo
2015
Vuelta del Uruguay

1st Stages 2, 3, 6 & 8

2nd Copa América de Ciclismo
2017
1st Stage 3b (TTT) Vuelta del Uruguay
4th Road race, Pan American Road Championships
