= Cycling at the 2003 Pan American Games – Women's road race =

The Women's Individual Road Race at the 2003 Pan American Games in Santo Domingo, Dominican Republic was held on the seventh day of the cycling competition, on 2003-08-16. The race had a total distance of 85 kilometres.

== Results ==
Rank	Name	Time
1	Yoanka González (CUB)	2:21.19
2	Janildes Fernandes (BRA)	
3	Yeilín Fernández (CUB)	
4	Belem Guerrero (MEX)	
5	María Luisa Calle (COL)	
6	Maria Castañeda (GUA)	
7	Anrossy Paruta (VEN)	
8	Amelia Blanco (DOM)	
9	Graciela Martínez (ARG)	
10	Juana Fernández (DOM)	
11	Claudia Aravena (CHI)	
12	Iona Wynter (JAM)	
13	Yudemis Domínguez (CUB)	
14	Valeria Pintos (ARG)	
15	Evelyn García (ESA)	
16	Clara Hughes (CAN)	
17	Dayana Chirinos (VEN)	
18	María Dolores Molina (GUA)	
19	Magdaly Trujillo (COL)	
20	Angie González (VEN)	
21	Rosane Kirch (BRA)	+ 0.10
22	Julia Hawley (BER)	
23	Ines Eppers (BOL)	
24	Maribel Díaz (MEX)	
25	Anabella López (GUA)	
26	Hilda Castillo (DOM)	
27	Marie Rosado (PUR)	
28	Susan Brown (ISV)	
29	Sandra Gómez (COL)	+ 0.34
–	Verónica Leal (MEX)	DNF
–	María Parra (ECU)	DNF

== See also ==
- Cycling at the 2004 Summer Olympics – Women's road race
