= Roberto Pinheiro =

Brazilian cyclist

Personal information
- Full name: Roberto Pinheiro da Silva
- Nickname: Betinho
- Born: January 9, 1983 (age 43) Parnamirim, Brazil

Cycling career
- Sport: Cycling
- Current team: UniFunvic–Pindamonhangaba
- Discipline: Road
- Role: Rider
- Rider type: Sprinter

Amateur teams
- 2000–2001: Clenilson Bikes
- 2002–2007: União–Assis–Amea
- 2008–2009: Team Vale–JKS–Sundown–Pindamonhangaba
- 2018: Funvic/Soul Brasil Pro Cycling
- 2023: Avulso
- 2024–: UniFunvic–Pindamonhangaba

Professional team
- 2010–2017: Funvic–Pindamonhangaba

Roberto Pinheiro da Silva (born January 9, 1983, in Parnamirim) is a Brazilian cyclist, who currently rides for club team UniFunvic–Pindamonhangaba. In April 2018, he was suspended from the sport for four years, following irregularities with his biological passport.

== Major results ==
2005
9th Copa América de Ciclismo
2007
2nd Road race, National Road Championships
7th Overall Volta do Paraná
10th Prova Ciclística 9 de Julho
2008
7th Prova Ciclística 9 de Julho
2009
4th Copa América de Ciclismo
2010
Vuelta del Uruguay

1st Stages 5 & 9

Volta Ciclística Internacional do Rio Grande do Sul

1st Stages 4 & 5

5th Overall Giro do Interior de São Paulo
2011
1st Prova Ciclística 9 de Julho
Tour do Brasil

1st Points classification
1st Stages 4, 6 & 8

1st Stage 4 Volta Ciclística Internacional do Rio Grande do Sul
2nd Copa América de Ciclismo
2012
1st Stage 5 Tour do Rio
2nd Copa América de Ciclismo
2013
4th Copa América de Ciclismo
2014
2nd Road race, National Road Championships
2015
Volta Ciclística Internacional do Rio Grande do Sul

1st Points classification
1st Stage 1

2016
~~3rd Road race, National Road Championships~~
2017
1st Stage 3b (TTT) Vuelta del Uruguay
2018
1st Stage 2a (TTT) Vuelta del Uruguay
2024
1st Road race, National Road Championships
