= 2005 Copa América de Ciclismo =

Copa América de Ciclismo
2004–2005 UCI America Tour

Race details
- Dates: January 9, 2005
- Stages: 1
- Distance: 33.6 km (20.88 mi)
- Winning time: 0h 45' 52"

Results
| | Winner | Nilceu Santos (BRA) |
| | Second | Cristian Leon (ARG) |
| | Third | Héctor Figueiras (BRA) |

The fifth edition of the Copa América de Ciclismo was held on 9 January 2005 in São Paulo, Brazil.

== Results ==
| Place | Men's Competition | | Women's Competition | |
| Place | Name | Time | Name | Time |
|---|---|---|---|---|
| 1. | Nilceu Santos (BRA) | 00:45.52 | Clemilda Fernandes (BRA) | 00:35.47 |
| 2. | Cristian Leon (ARG) | | Debora Gerhard (BRA) | +0.24 |
| 3. | Marcos Novello (BRA) | +0.01 | Janildes Fernandes (BRA) | +2.37 |
| 4. | Rodrigo Mendieta (ARG) | +0.05 | Rosane Kirch (BRA) | +2.38 |
| 5. | Raúl Turano (ARG) | | Uênia Fernandes (BRA) | +2.46 |
| 6. | Rodrigo Brito (BRA) | | Carla Camargo (BRA) | +2.54 |
| 7. | MacDonald Fernandes (BRA) | | Patricia Moreira (BRA) | |
| 8. | André Luiz Pulini (BRA) | | | |
| 9. | Roberto Pinheiro (BRA) | | | |
| 10. | Neilson Fernandes (BRA) | | | |
