= Renato Seabra =

Brazilian cyclist

Personal information
- Full name: Renato Martins Seabra
- Born: 25 April 1978 (age 48) Marília, Brazil

Cycling career
- Sport: Cycling
- Current team: Retired
- Discipline: Road
- Role: Rider

Professional teams
- 2008–2009: Scott–Marcondes Cesar
- 2010–2013: Clube DataRo

Renato Martins Seabra (born 25 April 1978, in Marília) is a former Brazilian cyclist. He competed at the 2000 Summer Olympics.

== Major results ==
2002
1st Stage 1 Tour de Santa Catarina
2005
4th Overall Volta Ciclística de Porto Alegre
2006
1st Prova Ciclística 9 de Julho
2nd Overall Tour de Santa Catarina

1st Mountains classification
1st Stage 2

2nd National Road Race Championships
9th Overall Volta Ciclística de Porto Alegre
2007
1st Overall Volta Ciclística Internacional do Paraná

1st Stage 3

9th Overall Tour de Santa Catarina
2009
5th Overall Volta Ciclística Internacional do Rio Grande do Sul
9th Overall Giro del Sol San Juan
2010
1st Overall Giro do Interior de São Paulo

1st Stage 2

3rd Overall Tour do Brasil
4th Overall Volta Ciclística Internacional do Rio Grande do Sul
6th Overall Tour de Santa Catarina
2011
1st Overall Volta Ciclística Internacional do Rio Grande do Sul
3rd Overall Giro do Interior de São Paulo

1st Stage 4

2012
4th Overall Tour do Brasil
