= Gregorio Bare =

Uruguayan cyclist

Personal information
- Full name: Gregorio Amadeo Bare Rossari
- Born: 19 March 1972 (age 54) Colonia, Uruguay

Cycling career
- Sport: Cycling

Gregorio Amadeo Bare Rossari (born 19 March 1972) is a Uruguayan cyclist. He competed at the 1996 Summer Olympics and the 2000 Summer Olympics.

He became world champion at the UCI B World Championships both in road cycling as track cycling. He won stages at the Vuelta del Uruguay (1993, 1994, 1995, 1997, 1999, 2000, 2001, 2002, 2003, 2006); Rutas de América (1997, 1999, 2001, 2002, 2003, 2006) and finished second at the 2002 Copa América de Ciclismo. He was also national time trial champion.
