= Hanna Talkanitsa =

Belarusian cyclist

Personal information
- Born: 2 September 1987 (age 39) Belarus

Cycling career
- Sport: Cycling
- Discipline: Road cycling

Professional team
- 2007–2008: USC Chirio Forno d'Asolo

Hanna Talkanitsa (born 2 September 1987) is a former road cyclist from Belarus. She represented her nation at the 2008 UCI Road World Championships in the women's time trial and women's road race.
