= Svetlana Kuznetsova (cyclist) =

Russian cyclist

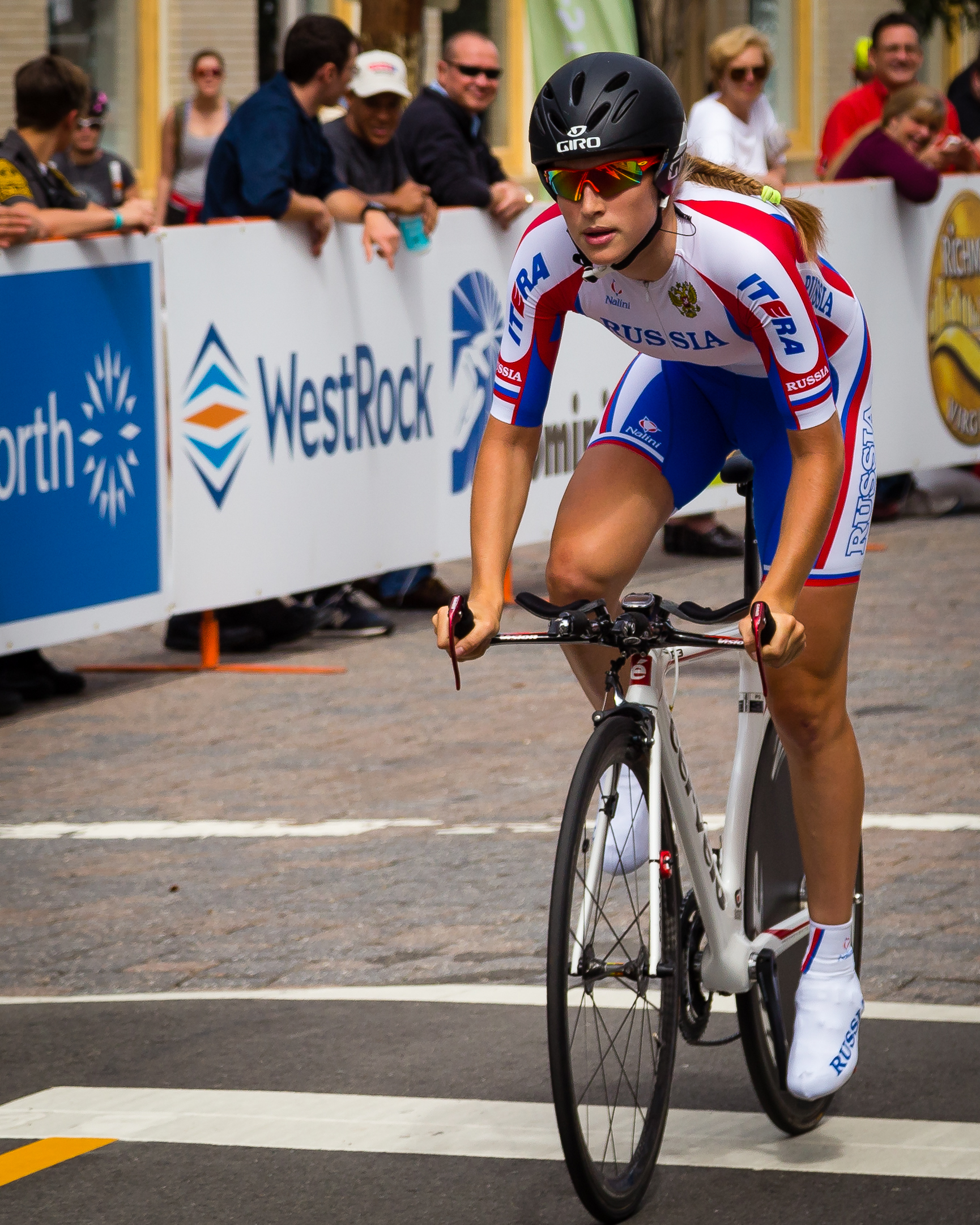
- Vasilieva at the 2015 UCI Road World Championships

Personal information
- Full name: Svetlana Kuznetsova
- Born: Svetlana Vasilieva; 15 July 1995 (age 31) Chita, Republic of Tatarstan, Russia

Cycling career
- Sport: Cycling
- Current team: Retired
- Disciplines: Road; Track
- Role: Rider

Professional team
- 2016: Astana

Svetlana Kuznetsova (née Vasilieva; born 15 July 1995) is a Russian former racing cyclist. She rode in the women's road race event at the 2017 UCI Road World Championships.

== Major results ==
2013
2nd Team pursuit, UCI Juniors Track World Championships
2nd Team pursuit, UEC European Junior Track Championships
2015
1st Overall Tour of Adygeya

1st Points classification
1st Stage 1

Military World Games

2nd Team road race
3rd Time trial

2nd Grand Prix of Maykop
8th Overall Tour de Feminin-O cenu Českého Švýcarska
9th Overall Tour de Bretagne Féminin
2016
3rd Time trial, National Road Championships
10th Overall Tour de Feminin-O cenu Českého Švýcarska
10th Grand Prix de Plumelec-Morbihan Dames
2017
3rd Road race, National Road Championships
