= Prova Ciclística 9 de Julho =

Road bicycle racing event in Brazil

The Prova Ciclística 9 de Julho (Portuguese for July 9 Cycling Race) is a single day road bicycle racing event held in Brazil. It was created in 1933 by journalist Cásper Líbero. He worked at the Gazeta Esportiva sports newspaper and created the race to honor the Constitutionalist Revolution that occurred in the state of São Paulo on that date the previous year. The race currently exists as both a men's and women's competition. The men's competition is part of the UCI America Tour. The women's competition has been held since 1990.

== Race Circuits ==
Years	Location	Elite Men's distance (Laps)	Elite Women's distance (Laps)
2001	Parque Villa-Lobos	80 km (20)	?
2002-2006	Autódromo José Carlos Pace	85.8 km (20)	21.5 km (5)
2007	Cidade Universitária	110 km	?
2008-2013	Autódromo José Carlos Pace	85.8 km (20)	21.5 km (5)
2014	Indaiatuba		
2015-2018	Avenida Lineu de Paula Machado		

== Past winners ==
Edition	Year	Men's winner	Women's winner
1st	1933	(Brazil) José Magnani	No race
2nd	1934	(Brazil) José Magnani	No race
3rd	1935	(Brazil) Amélio Sarto	No race
4th	1936	(Brazil) Luiz Lima	No race
5th	1937	(Brazil) Rolando Montesi	No race
6th	1938	(Brazil) Rolando Montesi	No race
7th	1939	(Brazil) Arthur Ferreira	No race
8th	1940	(Brazil) José Magnani	No race
9th	1947	(Brazil) Rolando Montesi	No race
10th	1948	(Argentina) Jorge Oliveira	No race
11th	1949	(Portugal) Fernando Moreira	No race
12th	1950	(Uruguay) José Taccone	No race
13th	1951	(Argentina) Pedro Salas	No race
14th	1952	(Portugal) Antonio Alves Barbosa	No race
15th	1955	(Portugal) Antonio Alves Barbosa	No race
16th	1956	(Brazil) Antônio Alba	No race
17th	1957	(Portugal) Arthur Coelho	No race
18th	1958	(Brazil) Cláudio Rosa	No race
19th	1959	(Italy) Luigi Cussigh	No race
20th	1960	(Uruguay) Rubens Etchebarne	No race
21st	1961	(Brazil) Cláudio Rosa	No race
22nd	1962	(Brazil) José Élcio Corá	No race
23rd	1963	(Brazil) Tércio Andrade	No race
24th	1964	(Brazil) Antônio Ferreira	No race
25th	1965	(Brazil) Luiz Carlos Fonseca	No race
26th	1969	(Brazil) Luiz Carlos Flores	No race
27th	1970	(Brazil) Saul Alcântara	No race
28th	1971	(Brazil) Miguel Duarte Silva	No race
29th	1972	(Brazil) José George Brave	No race
30th	1973	(Brazil) Saul Alcântara	No race
31st	1974	(Argentina) Juan Carlos Haedo	No race
32nd	1975	(Uruguay) Héctor Rondón	No race
33rd	1976	(Uruguay) Roberto Castroman	No race
34th	1977	(Brazil) Miguel Duarte Silva	No race
35th	1978	(Bolivia) Edgar Cueto	No race
36th	1979	(Chile) Sérgio Aliste	No race
37th	1980	(Brazil) Jair Braga	No race
38th	1981	(Brazil) Gilson Avaristo	No race
39th	1982	(Brazil) Ailton Souza	No race
40th	1983	(Brazil) Gabriel Rodrigues	No race
41st	1984	(Brazil) Gilson Avaristo	No race
42nd	1985	(Brazil) Ailton Souza	No race
43rd	1986	(Brazil) Marcos Mazzaron	No race
44th	1987	(Brazil) Antônio Silvestre	No race
45th	1988	(Brazil) Ailton Souza	No race
46th	1989	(Brazil) Wanderley Magalhães	No race
47th	1990	(Brazil) Wanderley Magalhães	(Brazil) Flávia Salvi
48th	1991	(Brazil) Wanderley Magalhães	(France) Cláudia Carceroni-Saintagne
49th	1992	(Brazil) Márcio May	(France) Cláudia Carceroni-Saintagne
50th	1993	(Brazil) Jamil Suaiden	(Brazil) Carla Camargo Gardenal
51st	1994	(Brazil) Fábio Veloso Santos	(Brazil) Ieda Botelho
52nd	1995	(Brazil) Hernandes Cuadri	(Brazil) Rosane Minervino
53rd	1996	(Brazil) Valdir Lermen	(Brazil) Ieda Botelho
54th	1997	(Brazil) Valdir Lermen	(Brazil) Alessandra dos Santos
55th	1998	(Brazil) Luciano Pagliarini	(Brazil) Janildes Fernandes
56th	1999	(Brazil) Patrique Gama Azevedo	(Brazil) Janildes Fernandes
57th	2000	(Brazil) Murilo Fischer	(Brazil) Janildes Fernandes
58th	2001	(Brazil) Nilceu Santos	(Brazil) Jaqueline Mantovani
59th	2002	(Brazil) Rodrigo de Mello Brito	(France) Cláudia Carceroni-Saintagne
60th	2003	(United States) John Lieswyn	(Brazil) Ana Cristina Matto
61st	2004	(Brazil) Nilceu Santos	(France) Cláudia Carceroni-Saintagne
62nd	2005	(Brazil) Roberson Silva	(Brazil) Luciene Ferreira da Silva
63rd	2006	(Brazil) Renato Seabra	(Brazil) Débora Gerhard
64th	2007	(Brazil) Rafael Andriato	(Brazil) Luciene Ferreira da Silva
65th	2008	(Cuba) Michel García	(Brazil) Camila Coelho
66th	2009	(Brazil) Bruno Tabanez	(Brazil) Débora Gerhard
67th	2010	(Argentina) Francisco Chamorro	(Brazil) Débora Gerhard
68th	2011	(Brazil) Roberto Pinheiro	(Brazil) Fernanda da Silva
69th	2015	(Brazil) Joel Cândido Prado Júnior	(Brazil) Daniela Lionço
