= Edita Ungurytė =

Lithuanian bicycle racer (born 1987)

Personal information
- Born: 30 July 1987 (age 39) Panevėžys, Lithuania

Cycling career
- Sport: Cycling
- Discipline: Road cycling

Professional teams
- 2008: Usc Chirio Forno D'asolo
- 2010: Acs Chirio-Forno D'asolo

Edita Ungurytė (born 30 July 1987) is a road cyclist from Lithuania. She represented her nation at the 2009 UCI Road World Championships.
