= Urtė Juodvalkytė =

Lithuanian cyclist (born 1986)

Personal information
- Born: 23 December 1986 (age 39) Lithuania

Cycling career
- Sport: Cycling
- Discipline: Road cycling

Professional teams
- 2008: Usc Chirio Forno D'asolo
- 2011-2012: Vaiano-Tepso

Urtė Juodvalkytė (born 23 December 1986) is a road cyclist from Lithuania. She participated at the 2006 UCI Road World Championships and 2011 UCI Road World Championships.
