= Cycling at the 2015 Military World Games =

- Venue: Mungyeong Cycling Course
- Dates: 6–8 October 2015

Road cycling was contested at the 2015 Military World Games. A total of six medal events were held.

== Medal summary ==
=== Road cycling ===
Event	Gold	Silver	Bronze
Men's road race	Park Kyoung-ho; South Korea	Park Keon-woo; South Korea	Aleksei Tcatevich; Russia
Women's road race	Natalia Boyarskaya; Russia	Clemilda Fernandes; Brazil	Janildes Fernandes; Brazil
Men's time trial	Magno do Prado; Brazil	Behnam Khosroshahi; Iran	Alireza Haghi; Iran
Women's time trial	Natalia Boyarskaya; Russia	Ana Paula Polegatch; Brazil	Svetlana Vasilieva; Russia
Men's team road race	South Korea (KOR); Choi Seung-woo; Jang Ji-ung; Jung Ji-min; Kang Suk-ho; Oh Tae-hee; Park Keon-woo; Park Kyoung-ho	France (FRA); Bruno Armirail; Lucien Capot; Julien Gonnet; Vincent Graczyk; Olivier Lefrancois; Adrien Quinio; Benoit Sinner; Etienne Tortelier	Germany (GER); Marcel Kalz; Jonas Koch; Michel Koch; Alexander Mueller; Stefan Schaefer; Kevin Vogel
Women's team road race	Brazil (BRA); Clemilda Fernandes; Janildes Fernandes; Flávia Oliveira; Uênia Fernandes de Souza	Russia (RUS); Natalia Boyarskaya; Yuria Ilinykh; Svetlana Vasilieva; Irina Molicheva	Belgium (BEL); Kaat Hannes; Maaike Polspoel

== Medal table ==
* Host nation (South Korea)

Rank	Nation	Gold	Silver	Bronze	Total
1	Brazil	2	2	1	5
2	Russia	2	1	2	5
3	South Korea*	2	1	0	3
4	Iran	0	1	1	2
5	France	0	1	0	1
6	Belgium	0	0	1	1
6	Germany	0	0	1	1
Totals (7 entries)		6	6	6	18
