= 2001 Copa América de Ciclismo =

Race details
- Dates: January 7, 2001
- Stages: 1
- Distance: 42 km (26.10 mi)
- Winning time: 00h 51' 06"

Results
	Winner	André Grizante (BRA)
	Second	Murilo Fischer (BRA)
	Third	Francisco Belo (BRA)

The first edition of the Copa América de Ciclismo was held on Sunday 7 January 2001 in São Paulo, Brazil. The Copa América opened the Brazilian season and took place on the Formula One-track in the city of São Paulo-Interlagos, a circuit of 4.3 km (2.7 mi).

== Results ==
Place	Men's Competition	
Place	Name	Time
1.	André Grizante (BRA)	00:51.06
2.	Murilo Fischer (BRA)	
3.	Francisco Belo (BRA)	
4.	Valcemar Justino da Silva (BRA)	
5.	Francisco Henrique (BRA)	
6.	Hernandes Cuadri (BRA)	
7.	Celso Anderson (BRA)	
8.	Doug Ziewacz (USA)	+1.00
9.	Márcio May (BRA)	
10.	Antonio Xavier do Nascimento (BRA)	
