= Montréal–Boston Tour =

The Montréal–Boston Tour was a proposed eight-day stage race of road bicycle racing in the United States and Canada, and was expected to be the largest cycling event in New England since the 1990 Tour de Trump. It was initially scheduled for August 2007, but in May 2007 organisers announced that the Tour would be postponed until summer 2008. The organisers cited logistics issues related to the organisation of an international race over four states and provinces, though it was hinted that the Floyd Landis scandal made it difficult to find proper financing (publicity backers) on the USA side of the race.

The Montréal–Boston Tour was to be part of the 2007-2008 UCI America Tour.

== See also ==
- Boston–Montreal–Boston
