= 2004 Copa América de Ciclismo =

Race details
- Dates: January 11, 2004
- Stages: 1
- Distance: 34.5 km (21.44 mi)
- Winning time: 0h 45' 40"

Results
	Winner	Além Reyes (URU)
	Second	Edy Cisneros (ARG)
	Third	Armando Camargo (BRA)

The fourth edition of the Copa América de Ciclismo was held on January 11, 2004 in São Paulo, Brazil. The Copa América opened the Brazilian season and took place on the Formula One-track in the city of São Paulo-Interlagos, a circuit of 4.3 km (2.7 mi).

== Results ==
Place	Men's Competition	
Place	Name	Time
1.	Além Reyes (URU)	00:45.40
2.	Edy Cisneros (ARG)	
3.	Armando Camargo (BRA)	
4.	Rodrigo Mendieta (ARG)	+0.05
5.	Alejandro Barrajo (ARG)	
6.	Antonio Nascimento (BRA)	
7.	Jean Carlos Coloca (BRA)	
8.	Fábio Bensi (BRA)	
9.	Emile Abraham (TRI)	
10.	Raimundo Carvalho (BRA)	
