= José Serpa =

Colombian cyclist (born 1979)

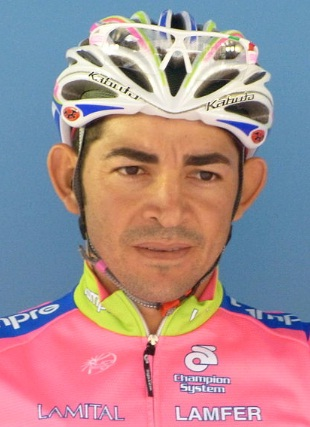
- Serpa at the 2013 Tour of the Basque Country

Personal information
- Full name: José Rodolfo Serpa Pérez
- Born: 17 April 1979 (age 47) Corozal, Sucre, Colombia
- Height: 1.78 m (5 ft 10 in)
- Weight: 64 kg (141 lb; 10.1 st)

Cycling career
- Sport: Cycling
- Discipline: Road
- Role: Rider
- Rider type: Climber

Amateur teams
- 2005–2006: Gobernacíon del Zulía
- 2016: Arroz Sonora
- 2017: Supergiros
- 2021–2023: Team Cartagena Liga de Bolivar

Professional teams
- 2006–2012: Selle Italia–Diquigiovanni
- 2013–2015: Lampre–Merida
- 2018–2019: GW–Shimano

Major wins
- Stage races Tour de Langkawi (2009, 2012) 7 individual stages One-day races and Classics Pan American Games – Individual Time Trial (2003) Pan American Road Race Championship (2006) Central American and Caribbean Games – Individual Time Trial (2006) Other UCI America Tour (2005–06)
Medal record
Representing Colombia
Men's track cycling
Pan American Games
Silver medal – second place	2007 Rio de Janeiro	Points Race
Silver medal – second place	2007 Rio de Janeiro	Madison
Central American and Caribbean Games
Gold medal – first place	2006 Cartagena	Team Pursuit
Men's road cycling
Pan American Games
Gold medal – first place	2003 Santo Domingo	Road Time Trial
Pan American Championships
Gold medal – first place	2006 São Paulo	Road race
Central American and Caribbean Games
Gold medal – first place	2006 Cartagena	Road Time Trial

José Rodolfo Serpa Pérez (born 17 April 1979) is a Colombian road racing cyclist, who last rode for Colombian amateur squad Team Cartagena. He competed professionally between 2006 and 2015 and from 2018 to 2019, riding for UCI Professional Continental team Androni Giocattoli–Venezuela for seven years, spending three years with Lampre–Merida, and two years with GW–Shimano.

During his professional career, Serpa has taken almost twenty victories, with the majority of these coming at the Tour de Langkawi – where he won the overall race in 2009 and 2012, along with seven stage wins. He also won the time trial at the 2003 Pan American Games and the 2006 Central American and Caribbean Games, the road race at the 2006 Pan American Cycling Championships, and was the overall winner of the 2005–06 UCI America Tour.

== Major results ==
2001
2nd Team pursuit, UCI Track World Cup Classics, Cali
2002
3rd Time trial, National Road Championships
2003
Pan American Games

1st Individual time trial
3rd Team pursuit

2nd Time trial, National Road Championships
2005
3rd Time trial, National Road Championships
6th Time trial, Pan American Road Championships
6th Overall Vuelta a Venezuela
7th Overall Clásico Ciclístico Banfoandes

1st Stage 5

2006
1st Overall 2005–06 UCI America Tour
Pan American Road Championships

1st Road race
6th Time trial

1st Time trial, Central American and Caribbean Games
1st Overall Vuelta a Venezuela

1st Stage 4 (ITT)

1st Stage 12 Vuelta a Colombia
2nd Time trial, National Road Championships
2nd Overall Vuelta al Táchira

1st Stages 7, 10 & 14 (ITT)

4th Overall Vuelta por un Chile Líder

1st Stage 6

6th Overall Tour de Langkawi

1st Stages 4 & 5

2007
1st Stage 5 Vuelta al Táchira
2nd Madison, Pan American Games
2nd Overall Le Tour de Langkawi

1st Stage 8

4th Overall Vuelta a Venezuela
5th Overall Vuelta por un Chile Líder
9th Giro di Toscana
2008
1st Overall Clásico Ciclístico Banfoandes

1st Points classification
1st Stages 6 & 7 (ITT)

1st Stage 9 (ITT) Vuelta a Venezuela
1st Stage 6 Le Tour de Langkawi
4th Overall Tour de San Luis
8th Overall Settimana Internazionale di Coppi e Bartali
9th Overall Giro del Trentino
2009
1st Overall Tour de Langkawi

1st Mountains classification
1st Stage 5

1st Stage 7 (ITT) Vuelta a Venezuela
3rd Overall Tour de San Luis

1st Stage 4

2010
2nd Overall Tour de San Luis
2nd Memorial Marco Pantani
3rd Overall Settimana Internazionale di Coppi e Bartali

1st Stage 2

7th Overall Giro del Trentino
8th Overall Settimana Ciclistica Lombarda

1st Stage 4

8th GP Industria & Artigianato di Larciano
2011
1st Giro del Friuli
1st Stage 1b (TTT) Settimana Internazionale di Coppi e Bartali
2nd Overall Tour de San Luis

1st Stage 2

2nd Overall Giro della Provincia di Reggio Calabria
2nd Overall Giro di Sardegna
4th Overall Settimana Ciclistica Lombarda
5th Gran Premio Città di Camaiore
8th GP Industria & Artigianato di Larciano
9th Giro della Romagna
2012
1st Overall Tour de Langkawi

1st Mountains classification
1st Stages 5 & 6

5th Overall Tour de San Luis
5th Gran Premio Industria e Commercio Artigianato Carnaghese
8th Overall Settimana Internazionale di Coppi e Bartali
2014
1st Trofeo Laigueglia
2017
10th Overall Vuelta a Colombia

1st Stage 7

2018
Vuelta al Táchira

1st Mountains classification
1st Stage 9

2019
3rd Road race, National Road Championships

=== Grand Tour general classification results timeline ===
Grand Tour	2006	2007	2008	2009	2010	2011	2012	2013	2014	2015
Giro d'Italia	31	—	26	13	30	52	87	27	—	—
Tour de France	—	—	—	—	—	—	—	21	48	122
Vuelta a España	—	—	—	—	—	—	—	—	93	—

Legend
—	Did not compete
DNF	Did not finish
