= Rosane Kirch =

Brazilian cyclist

Personal information
- Born: April 19, 1976 (age 50) Bacabal, Maranhão, Brazil

Sport
- Sport: Cycling
Medal record
Representing Brazil
South American Games
Silver medal – second place	2010 Medellin	Road race
Bronze medal – third place	2002 Belem	Time trial
Bronze medal – third place	2002 Belem	Points race

Rosane Kirch (born April 19, 1976) is a female professional road cyclist from Brazil.

== Career ==
2003
6th in Pan American Games, Road, Individual Time Trial, Santo Domingo (DOM)
2004
62nd in UCI Road World Championships, Verona, Italy (ITA)
2005
4th in Copa America de Ciclismo (BRA)
2006
2nd in Copa America de Ciclismo (BRA)
2007
3rd in Copa America de Ciclismo (BRA)
2008
10th in Copa America de Ciclismo (BRA)
2nd in GP Varazze Citta Delle Donne (ITA)
2nd in Stage 3 Route de France Féminine, Les Settons (FRA)
2nd in General Classification Route de France Féminine (FRA)
2009
9th in Copa America de Ciclismo (BRA)
