= Valdir Lermen =

Brazilian cyclist

Personal information
- Born: 7 April 1977 (age 49)

Cycling career
- Sport: Cycling

Valdir Lermen (born 7 April 1977) is a Brazilian cyclist. He competed in the men's time trial at the 1996 Summer Olympics.
