= Clemilda Fernandes =

Brazilian racing cyclist

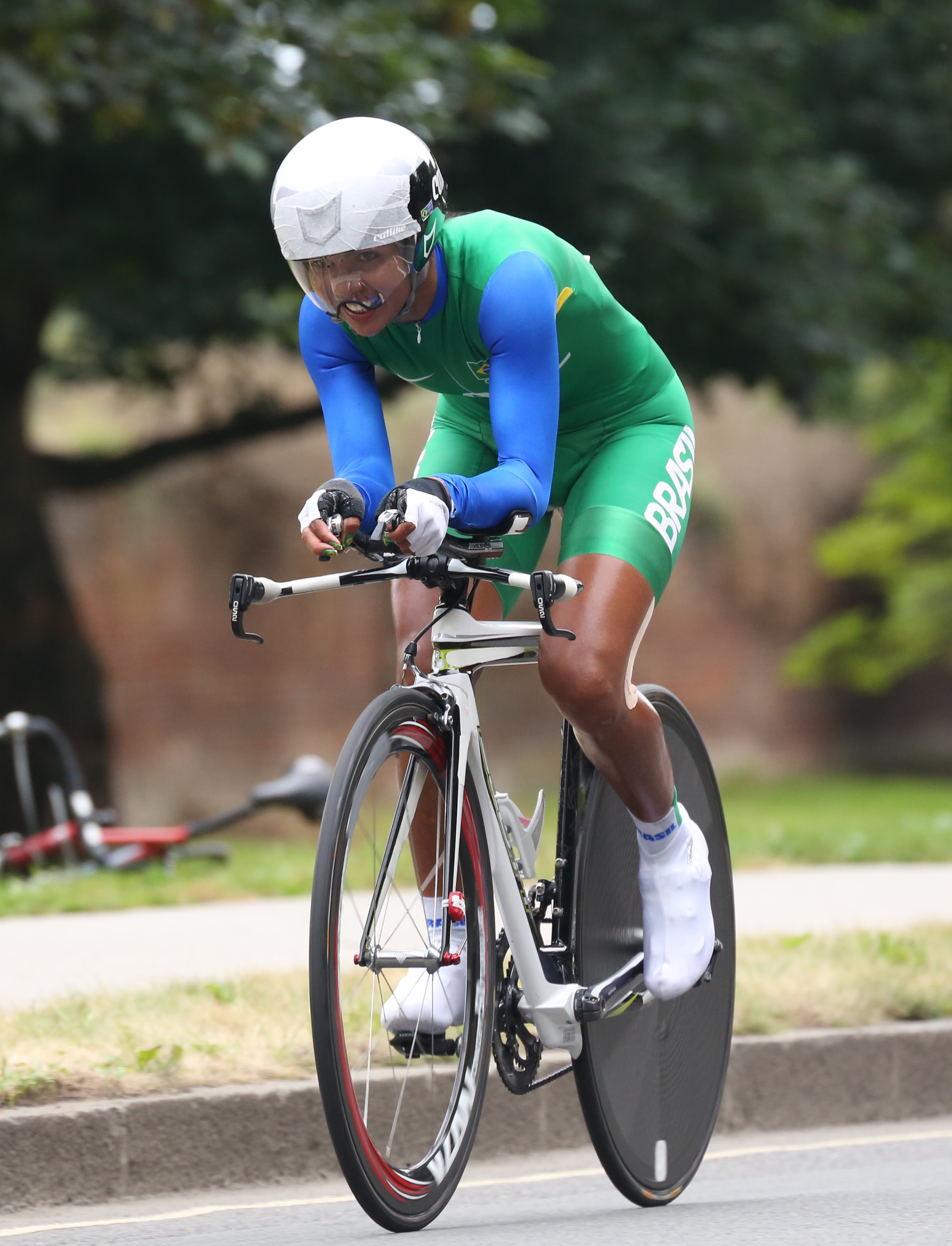
- Fernandes competing in the London 2012 Women's Olympic Time Trial

Personal information
- Full name: Clemilda Fernandes Silva
- Born: June 25, 1979 (age 47) São Félix do Araguaia, Brazil

Cycling career
- Sport: Cycling
- Current team: Suspended
- Discipline: Road
- Role: Rider

Professional teams
- 2004–2009: USC Chirio Forno d'Asolo
- 2013: Chirio Forno d'Asolo
- 2014: Bizkaia–Durango
- 2017: Servetto Giusta
- 2018: Conceria Zabri–Fanini
- 2019: Eurotarget–Bianchi–Vittoria

Major wins
- National Road Race Championships (2005, 2008, 2016); National Time Trial Championships (2013)
Medal record
Representing Brazil
Women's road cycling
Pan American Games
Bronze medal – third place	2007 Rio	Time trial
Pan American Championships
Bronze medal – third place	2006 São Paulo	Road Race
Bronze medal – third place	2012 Mar del Plata	Time trial
Bronze medal – third place	2015 León	Time trial
South American Games
Bronze medal – third place	2014 Santiago	Time trial
Military World Games
Gold medal – first place	2015 Mungyeong	Team Road Race
Silver medal – second place	2015 Mungyeong	Road Race

Clemilda Fernandes Silva (born June 25, 1979) is a Brazilian cycle racer, who is currently suspended from the sport.

== Career ==
Born in São Félix do Araguaia, Mato Grosso, Fernandes scored three consecutive wins in the Copa América de Ciclismo in 2005, 2006 and 2007. She competed in the Women's road race at the 2008 Summer Olympics, finishing in 51st place. At the 2012 Summer Olympics in the Women's road race, finishing 23rd, and in the Women's time trial, finishing 18th. She competed at the 2016 Olympic Games in Rio de Janeiro.

In 2019, Fernandes was given an eight-year ban for an anti-doping violation, specific to tampering.

== Major results ==
2003
1st Copa da Republica de Ciclismo
2nd Copa América de Ciclismo
2004
1st Stage 3 Trophée d'Or Féminin
2005
1st Road race, National Road Championships
1st Copa América de Ciclismo
1st Stage 3b Giro della Toscana Int. Femminile – Memorial Michela Fanini
3rd GP Città di Castenaso
2006
1st Copa América de Ciclismo
1st Stage 5 Tour Cycliste Féminin International de l'Ardèche
3rd Road race, Pan American Road Championships
3rd Road race, National Road Championships
6th Overall Giro della Toscana Int. Femminile – Memorial Michela Fanini
2007
1st Copa América de Ciclismo
1st Giro del Valdarno
3rd Time trial, Pan American Games
4th Overall Tour Cycliste Féminin International de l'Ardèche
6th Road race, Pan American Road Championships
7th Overall Vuelta Ciclista Femenina a El Salvador
2008
1st Road race, National Road Championships
3rd Copa América de Ciclismo
10th Road race, Pan American Road Championships
2009
2nd Road race, National Road Championships
2012
1st Overall Vuelta Ciclista Femenina a El Salvador

1st Stage 3a

2nd Clasicó Fundadeporte
Pan American Road Championships

3rd Time trial
6th Road race

4th Grand Prix el Salvador
10th Clásico Aniversario Federacion Ciclista de Venezuela
2013
National Road Championships

1st Time trial
2nd Road race

1st Grand Prix GSB
3rd Grand Prix de Oriente
4th Overall Vuelta Ciclista Femenina a El Salvador

1st Stages 3 & 7

4th Grand Prix el Salvador
2014
2nd Time trial, National Road Championships
3rd Time trial, South American Games
3rd Overall Tour Femenino de San Luis

1st Stage 2

4th Time trial, Pan American Road Championships
2015
Military World Games

1st Team road race
2nd Road race

1st Road race, National Road Championships
Pan American Road Championships

3rd Time trial
8th Road race

3rd Gran Prix San Luis Femenino
9th Time trial, Pan American Games
2016
National Road Championships

1st Time trial
1st Road race

7th Time trial, Pan American Road Championships
7th Copa Federación Venezolana de Ciclismo
8th Clasico FVCiclismo Corre Por la VIDA
2017
1st Team pursuit, National Track Championships
2nd Time trial, National Road Championships
2018
9th Time trial, Pan American Road Championships
2019
~~2nd Overall Tour Femenino de Venezuela II~~
~~2nd Tour Femenino de Venezuela I~~
