= Luciano Pagliarini =

Brazilian cyclist

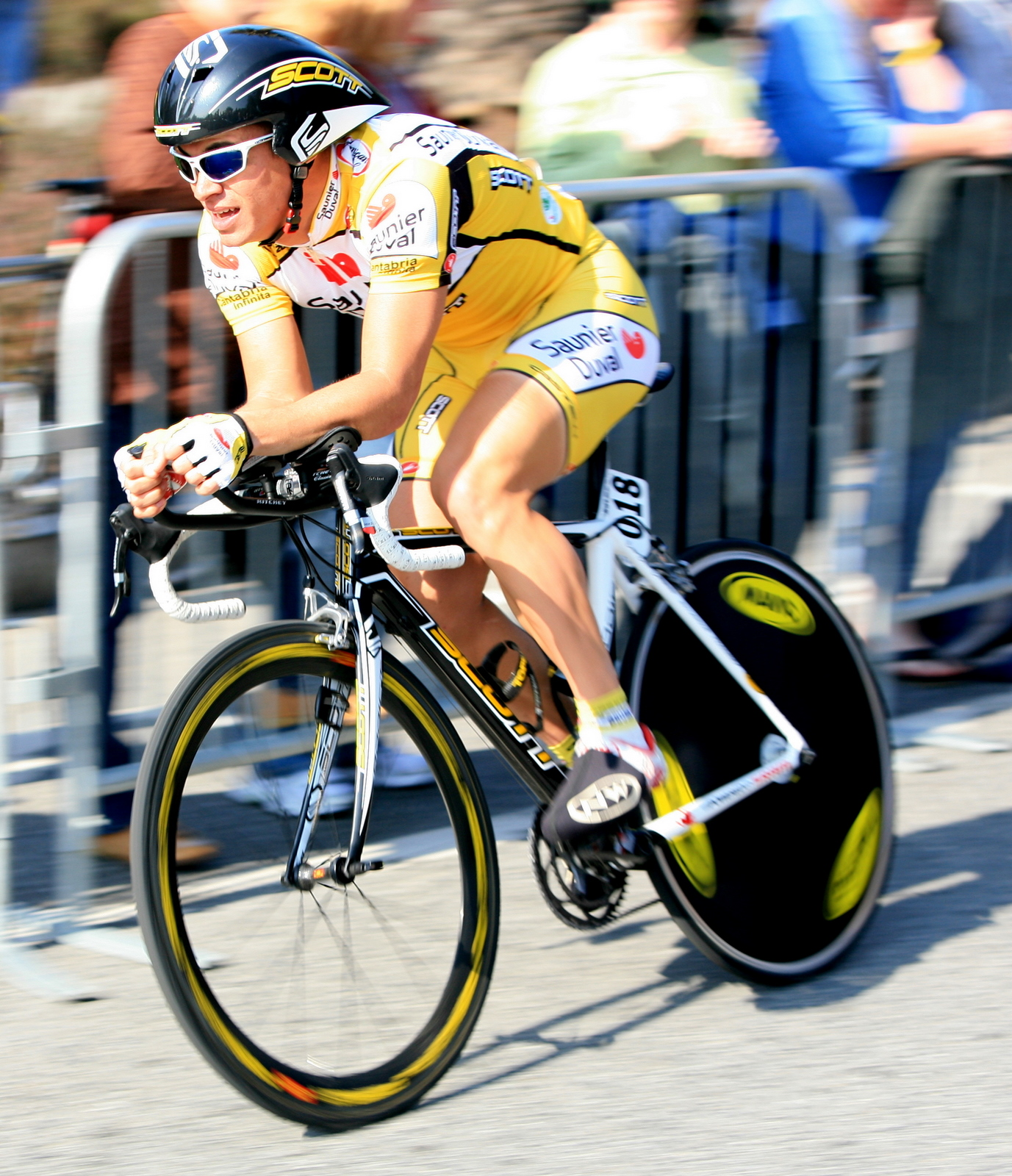
- Pagliarini at the 2008 Tour of California

Personal information
- Full name: Luciano André Pagliarini Mendonça
- Born: April 18, 1978 (age 48) Arapongas, Brazil
- Height: 1.74 m (5 ft 9 in)
- Weight: 68 kg (150 lb; 10.7 st)

Cycling career
- Sport: Cycling
- Discipline: Road/Track
- Role: Rider
- Rider type: Sprinter

Amateur teams
- 1999: Cadore Carla Travel
- 2000: Ima Carla Travel–Mazzonetto

Professional teams
- 2001–2004: Lampre–Daikin
- 2005: Liquigas–Bianchi
- 2006–2008: Saunier Duval–Prodir
- 2009: Memorial-Santos
- 2010: Scott–Marcondes Cesar–São José dos Campos

Major wins
- 2007 Eneco Tour of Benelux, 1 stage (2007)
Medal record
Representing Brazil
Men's road cycling
Pan American Games
Bronze medal – third place	2007 Rio	Road race

Luciano André Pagliarini Mendonça (born April 18, 1978, in Arapongas, state of Paraná) is a retired Brazilian cyclist. A renowned sprinter, he has been regarded as one of Brazil's finest cyclists. Pagliarini has taken part in the road cycling race at 2004 Summer Olympics (from which he withdrew due to mechanical trouble) and the 2005 Tour de France (best position: 5th on stage 2, withdrawal on stage 9).

== Career ==
=== 2007 ===
Due to health problems, Pagliarini had a bad start in the 2007 season, until the Pan American Games in July, where he won the bronze medal. Ten days after the birth of his first daughter, he won the fifth stage of the Eneco Tour, being the first Brazilian to acquire a victory in the UCI ProTour, with this victory he rebuilt his morale and later won a stage in the Tour of Missouri. This excellent end of the season convinced his team, Saunier Duval to renew his contract.

=== 2008 ===
Pagliarini had a good season start placing third in the last stage of Tour of Qatar and finishing 15th overall. He also won the 6th Stage of the Tour of California, ahead of Juan Jose Haedo and the world champion Paolo Bettini, two days before the Beijing Olympics Men's Road Race he was diagnosed with kidney stones and due to this fact he was the last rider to finish the course.

=== 2009 ===
This year was a dark year for the Brazilian sprinter after the team whose he had signed a contract, TelTech H2O, did not get a license from UCI and thereafter was disbanded. Luciano stayed out of contact for some months and gained some weight. In July he announced the comeback to his home country to race the Tour of Brazil with team Memorial-Santos and also his preparation on track cycling for the London 2012 Olympic Games.

=== 2010 ===
Following economic problems in the team Scott–Marcondes Cesar–São José dos Campos, including a lack of payment to Pagliarini, he withdrew from cycling to become a trainer for the Brazilian track team.

== Major results ==
1998
1st Prova Ciclística 9 de Julho
1st Stage 3 Vuelta Ciclista de Chile
1st Stages 4 & 10 Vuelta Ciclista del Uruguay
2000
1st Circuito del Porto
1st Vicenza-Bionde
2001
1st Clásica de Almería
1st Stages 2, 3 &4 Tour de Langkawi
2004
1st Stages 7 & 8 Tour de Langkawi
1st Stage 5 Vuelta a Murcia
2005
2nd GP Costa degli Etruschi
6th Trofeo Luis Puig
2007
1st Stage 5 Eneco Tour of Benelux
1st Stage 4 Tour of Missouri
3rd Road Race, Pan American Games
2008
1st Stage 6 Tour of California
2010
1st Stages 1, 5 & 6 Rutas de América
