= Cláudia Carceroni-Saintagne =

Brazilian cyclist

Personal information
- Full name: Cláudia Carceroni-Saintagne
- Born: 8 November 1962 (age 63) Belo Horizonte, Brazil
- Height: 165 cm (5 ft 5 in)
- Weight: 54 kg (119 lb)

Cycling career
- Sport: Cycling
- Discipline: Road cycling

Cláudia Carceroni-Saintagne (born 8 November 1962) is a road cyclist from Brazil. She represented her nation at the 1992 Summer Olympics in the women's road race and at the 2000 Summer Olympics in the women's road race.
