= José Magnani =

Brazilian cyclist

Personal information
- Born: 6 March 1913 São Paulo, Brazil
- Died: 24 July 1966 (aged 53)

Cycling career
- Sport: Cycling

José Magnani (6 March 1913 – 24 July 1966) was a Brazilian cyclist. He competed in the individual road race event at the 1936 Summer Olympics.
