= Márcia Fernandes =

Brazilian cyclist (born 1991)

Personal information
- Full name: Márcia Fernandes Silva
- Born: 29 May 1991 (age 35) Brazil

Cycling career
- Sport: Cycling
- Discipline: Road cycling

Professional teams
- 2010: Acs Chirio–Forno D'Asolo
- 2014: Bizkaia–Durango

Márcia Fernandes Silva (born 29 May 1991) is a road cyclist from Brazil. She participated at the 2010 UCI Road World Championships and 2011 UCI Road World Championships.

On 2014 October 2014, Fernandes was suspended for two years for returning a positive doping test for EPO by the Brazilian Cycling Confederation.

== Palmares ==
2009
5th Copa América de Ciclismo
2013
2nd Overall Grand Prix el Salvador

== See also ==
- List of doping cases in cycling
