= César Daneliczen =

Brazilian cyclist

Personal information
- Born: 16 August 1962 (age 64)

Cycling career
- Sport: Cycling

César Daneliczen (born 16 August 1962) is a Brazilian former cyclist. He competed in the team time trial at the 1988 Summer Olympics.
