= Giro do Interior de São Paulo =

Race details
- Date: June
- Region: São Paulo
- English name: Tour of the Interior of Sao Paulo
- Discipline: Road
- Competition: UCI America Tour
- Type: Stage race
- Race director: André Luiz Pulini
- Web site: www.girodointerior.com.br

History
- First edition: 2008
- Editions: 7 (as of 2014)
- First winner: Maurício Morandi (BRA)
- Most wins: No repeat winners
- Most recent: Gregolry Panizo (BRA)

The Giro do Interior de São Paulo is a stage race held annually in São Paulo, Brazil. It was part of UCI America Tour in category 2.2 in 2010 and 2011.

== Winners ==
Year	Country	Rider	Team
2008	Brazil	Maurício Morandi	Scott–Marcondes Cesar–São José dos Campos
2009	Brazil	Luis Tavares Amorim	Scott–Marcondes Cesar–São José dos Campos
2010	Brazil	Renato Seabra	Clube DataRo de Ciclismo-Foz do Iguaçu
2011	Brazil	Flávio Reblin	
2012	Brazil	Alex Diniz	Real Cycling Team
2013	Brazil	Antônio Nascimento	Funvic Brasilinvest–São José dos Campos
2014	Brazil	Gregolry Panizo	Clube DataRo–Bottechia
