= Copa América de Ciclismo =

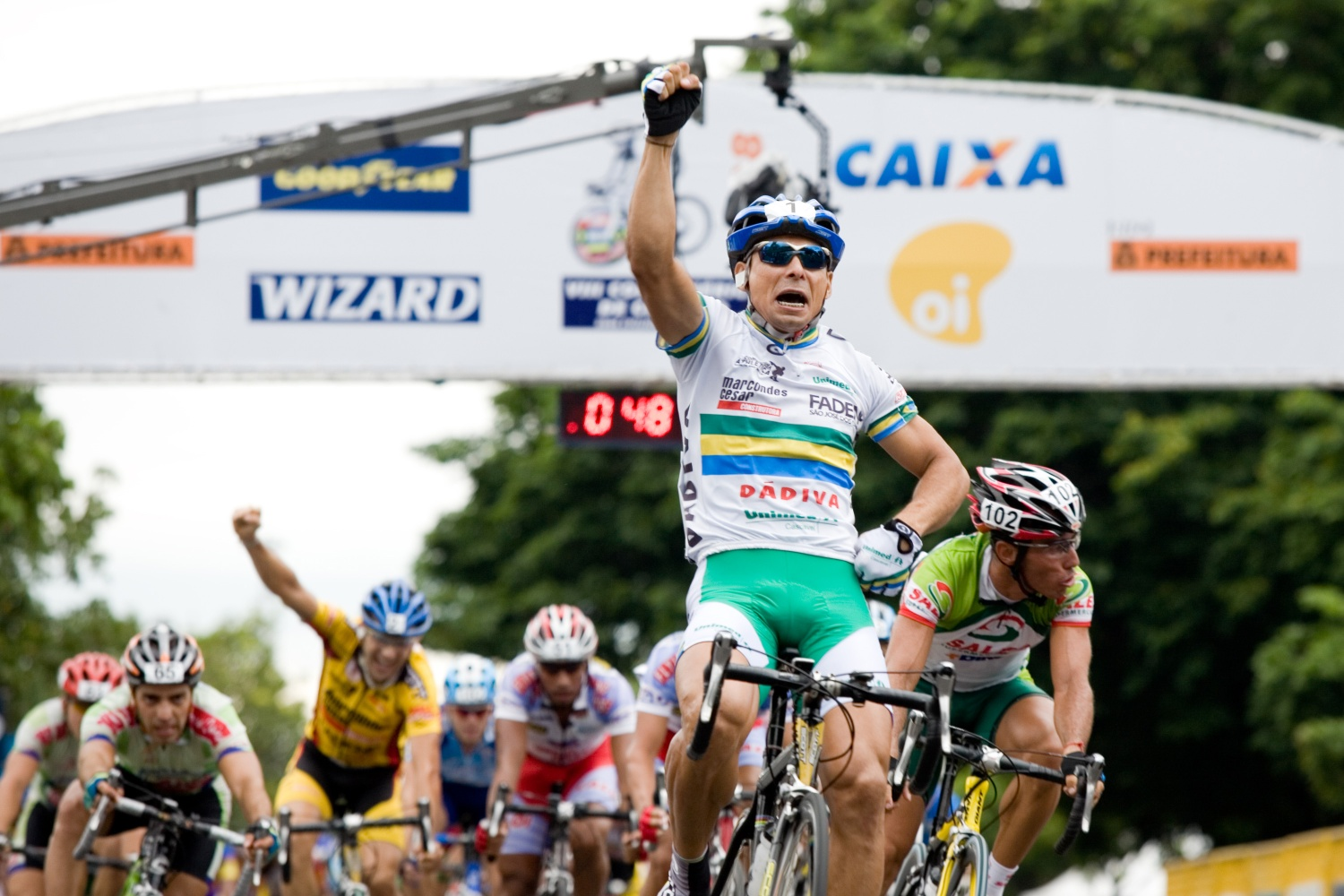
Nilceu Santos finishes first in the 2008 Copa América de Ciclismo.

The Copa América de Ciclismo is a single-day road bicycle racing event held in Brazil. From 2001 to 2007 and in 2009 it took place at Autódromo José Carlos Pace, in São Paulo. The 2008 edition was held in a street circuit around Flamengo Park, in Rio de Janeiro. The race exists as both a men's and a women's competition. The men's competition is part of the UCI America Tour.

== Men's winners ==
Year	Country	Rider	Team
2001	Brazil	André Grizante	
2002	United States	John Lieswyn	7 Up-NutraFig
2003	Brazil	Renato Roshler	Caloi-Suzano
2004	Uruguay	Além Reyes	Uruguay (national team)
2005	Brazil	Nilceu Santos	Scott–Marcondes Cesar–São José dos Campos
2006	Brazil	Nilceu Santos	Scott–Marcondes Cesar–São José dos Campos
2007	Brazil	Nilceu Santos	Scott–Marcondes Cesar–São José dos Campos
2008	Brazil	Nilceu Santos	Scott–Marcondes Cesar–São José dos Campos
2009	Argentina	Francisco Chamorro	Scott–Marcondes Cesar–São José dos Campos
2010	Brazil	Geraldo Souza Jr.	São Lucas Saúde-Americana
2011	Brazil	Breno Sidoti	Funvic–Pindamonhangaba
2012	Argentina	Francisco Chamorro	Real Cycling Team
2013	Argentina	Francisco Chamorro	Funvic Brasilinvest–São José dos Campos
2015	Brazil	Carlos Manarelli	Carrefour Funvic Soul Cycling Team

== Women's winners ==
Year	Winner
2003	(Brazil) Janildes Fernandes
2004	(Brazil) Uênia Fernandes
2005	(Brazil) Clemilda Fernandes
2006	(Brazil) Clemilda Fernandes
2007	(Brazil) Clemilda Fernandes
2008	(Brazil) Uênia Fernandes
2009	(Brazil) Janildes Fernandes
