= Daniel Valter Rogelim =

Brazilian cyclist (born 1972)

Daniel Rogelim
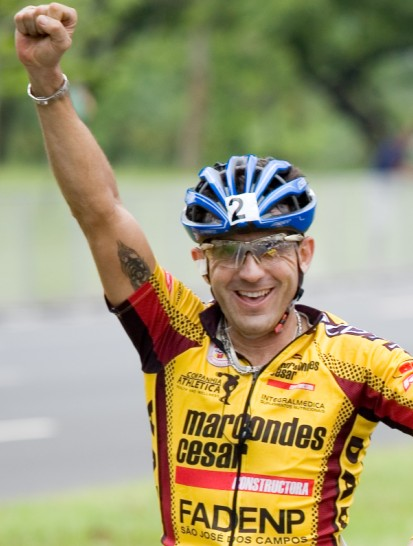

Personal information
- Full name: Daniel Valter Rogelim
- Born: October 13, 1972 (age 54) Concórdia, Brazil

Cycling career
- Sport: Cycling
- Current team: Scott–Marcondes Cesar–São José dos Campos
- Discipline: Road
- Role: Rider
- Rider type: Sprinter

Professional teams
- 1996–2005: ?
- 2006: Memorial-Santos
- 2007–: Scott–Marcondes Cesar–São José dos Campos

Major wins
- 1st overall – Torneio de Verão (2008) (Brazil) National Road Champion (2001) 1st overall GC – Tour de Santa Catarina (1996, 1999)

Daniel Valter Rogelim (born October 13, 1972) is a Brazilian professional racing cyclist for the Scott–Marcondes Cesar–São José dos Campos team.

== Career highlights ==
1996 –
1st overall GC – Tour de Santa Catarina (BRA)
1999 –
1st overall GC – Tour de Santa Catarina (BRA)
1st overall Mountains Classification – Vuelta Ciclista de Chile (BRA)
2000 –
2nd – National Road Championship, Elite Men (BRA)
2001 –
(Brazil) National Road Championship, Elite Men (BRA)
2002 –
1st overall GC – Volta do Rio de Janeiro (BRA)
2006 – Memorial-Santos
Stage 4 and 11 wins – Tour de Santa Catarina (BRA)
2007 – Scott–Marcondes Cesar–São José dos Campos
Stage 1 – Tour de Santa Catarina (BRA)
2008 – Scott–Marcondes Cesar–São José dos Campos
1st overall – Torneio de Verão (BRA)
