= Uênia Fernandes de Souza =

Brazilian cyclist (born 1984)

Uênia Fernandes
Personal information
- Full name: Uênia Fernandes de Souza
- Born: 12 August 1984 (age 42) Goiana, Pernambuco

Cycling career
- Sport: Cycling
- Discipline: Road
- Role: Rider

Professional teams
- 2008: USC Chirio-Forno D'asolo
- 2010–2011: ACS Chirio-Forno D'asolo
- 2013: Chirio Forno d'Asolo
- 2014: Estado de México–Faren Kuota
- 2015–: Alé–Cipollini
Medal record
Representing Brazil
Women's road cycling
Military World Games
Gold medal – first place	2015 Mungyeong	Team Road Race

Uenia Fernandes de Souza (born August 12, 1984) is a female professional racing cyclist from Brazil.

== Doping ==
On November 21, 2015, it emerged that de Souza had returned a positive drugs test for EPO and was subsequently suspended for 30 days.

== Palmares ==
2004
1st Copa América de Ciclismo
2005
1st Copa da Republica de Ciclismo
5th Copa América de Ciclismo
2007
1st Stage 3 part b Vuelta Ciclista Femenina a El Salvador, Multiplaza
4th Copa América de Ciclismo
2008
1st Copa América de Ciclismo
2015
(gold) Military World Games Team Road Race
