= John Lieswyn =

American racing cyclist and New Zealand transport planner

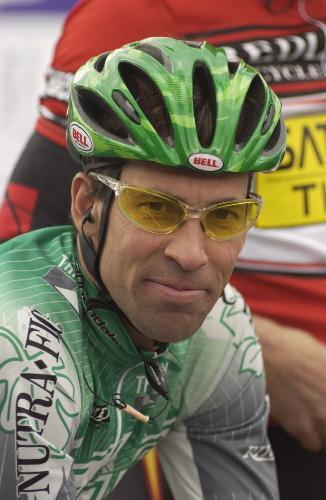

Personal information
- Born: 18 August 1968 (age 58) Pittsburgh, Pennsylvania, USA

Cycling career
- Sport: Cycling
- Current team: Retired
- Discipline: Road
- Role: Rider

Amateur team
- 1989: Taco Bell - Pepsi Cola

Professional teams
- 1992: Saturn Cycling Team
- 1993–1994: Coors Light–Serotta
- 1997–2000: Team Shaklee
- 2001–2003: 7 UP–Maxxis
- 2004–2005: Health Net–Maxxis

Major wins
- One-day races and Classics National Time Trial Championships (2004)

John Lieswyn (born 18 August 1968) is an American former professional road bicycle racer.

== Career ==
Lieswyn started his road racing career in Florida in 1985, and raced for the University of Florida's Cycling Club (Team Florida). After graduation from college in 1990, he raced three seasons for the US National team in Germany, France and Italy. Lieswyn turned professional in 1993 for Coors Light. He returned to Europe in 1995, scoring numerous top ten results and winning the Delémont (Switzerland) mountain stage of the Regio-Tour. After taking a break in 1996, he focused on the US domestic scene with over 40 major wins. In the pre and post US-season, he competed in South America, Australia and New Zealand, notably taking three stage wins in the Herald Sun Tour (Australia), and overall victory at the Southland Tour (NZ), the Nature Valley Grand Prix in Minnesota, and Tour de Beauce (Canada). He finished second in his last USA professional race, the 2005 San Francisco Grand Prix. His fifth and last time representing the USA National Team was the 2005 World Road Cycling Championships in Spain, where he was a domestique (worker) for the USA team sprinters.

In 2012 David Zabriskie the original winner of the 2004 United States National Time Trial Championships was found guilty of doping and his results from May 2003 to July 2006 were stripped. This made Lieswyn, who originally came second, the new winner.

== Post-cycling ==
He retired from racing at the end of the 2005 season and moved to New Zealand to work as a transportation planner. Lieswyn has a master's degree in transport planning from the University of Canterbury, which he completed in 2012. In 2012 he returned to the USA and lived in Davis, California; before returning to New Zealand in 2015.

== Major results ==
1989
1st Overall Tour of the Gila
1991
1st USA National Team Time Trial
1st Stage 2 International Cycling Classic
3rd Amateur National Championships, road race
1992
1st Stage 17 International Cycling Classic
1st Stage 8 Commonwealth Bank Classic
1994
6th Reading Classic
1995
1st Stage 7, Regio-Tour
5th Lancaster Classic
7th Overall Tour Poitou-Charentes en Nouvelle-Aquitaine
1997
1st Stage 6 International Cycling Classic
1st Stage 10 Tour of Ohio
2nd Overall Vuelta a Guatemala
5th Overall Killington Stage Race

1st Stage 3

1998
1st Stage 13 Herald Sun Tour
1st Overall Tour of Ohio

1st Stages 1 & 3

1999
1st Chris Thater Memorial Criterium
1st Stage 3 Bermuda GP
2000
1st Stage 4 Herald Sun Tour
National championships

2nd Time trial
3rd Road race

2nd Tour Lefleur
4th First Union Wilmington Classic
7th Overall Sea Otter Classic
7th Philadelphia International Cycling Classic
8th Reading Classic
2001
1st Stage 2 Herald Sun Tour
1st Stage 9 International Cycling Classic
1st Stage 3, Tour of Willamette
1st Chris Thater Memorial Criterium
6th Overall Tour of Southland

1st Stages 1 & 2

9th Overall Tour de Beauce
2002
1st Copa América de Ciclismo
1st Overall Tour of Southland

1st Stages 1 & 6 (ITT)

1st Overall North Star Grand Prix

1st Stage 2

1st Overall Gateway Cup

1st Stages 2, 3 & 4

1st Stage 5 Cascade Cycling Classic
7th Overall Redlands Classic
10th Overall Sea Otter Classic
2003
1st Overall Tour de Beauce

1st Stage 1

1st Overall Gateway Cup
1st Stage 10 International Cycling Classic
5th Lancaster Classic
7th Overall Sea Otter Classic
7th Overall Redlands Classic

1st Stage 3

9th Overall Tour of Georgia
2004
1st National time trial championship
1st Overall Tour of Southland

1st Stage 1 (TTT)

1st Overall International Tour de Toona

1st Stage 3

1st Overall Gateway Cup

1st Stages 2 & 3

1st Overall Tobago Cycling Classic

1st Stages 3 & 4

1st Stage 5, Nature Valley Grand Prix
1st K2 Classic
4th Overall Redlands Classic
2005
1st Overall Nature Valley Grand Prix

1st Stage 2

1st Stage 1 (TTT) Tour of Southland
2nd San Francisco Grand Prix
4th Overall Tour de Beauce
