= Janildes Fernandes =

Brazilian road bicycle racer

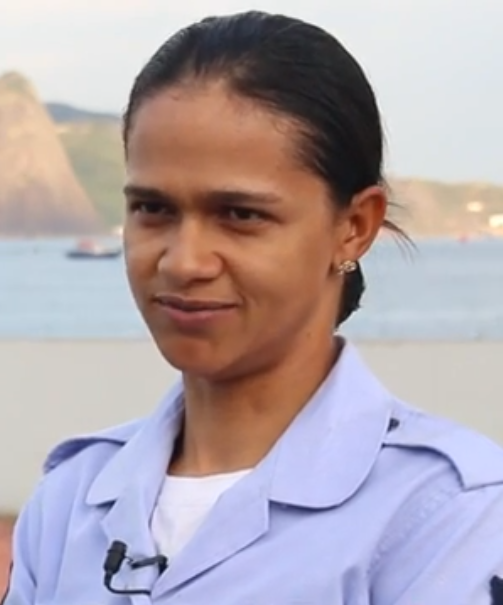
- In a Ministry of Defense video in 2015

Personal information
- Full name: Janildes Fernandes Silva
- Born: 23 August 1980 (age 46) São Félix do Araguaia, Mato Grosso, Brazil
- Height: 1.70 m (5 ft 7 in)
- Weight: 52 kg (115 lb)

Cycling career
- Sport: Cycling
- Disciplines: Road; Track
- Role: Rider

Amateur teams
- 2003: Team Prato Marathon Bike
- 2005: USC Chirio Forno d'Asolo
- 2007: USC Chirio Forno d'Asolo

Professional teams
- 2001–2002: Acca Due O–Lorena Camicie
- 2004: SC Michela Fanini Record Rox
- 2006: SC Michela Fanini Record Rox
- 2008–2009: USC Chirio Forno d'Asolo
Medal record
Women's road cycling
Representing Brazil
Pan American Games
Silver medal – second place	2003 Santo Domingo	Road race
Bronze medal – third place	1999 Winnipeg	Road race
Pan American Championships
Bronze medal – third place	2002 Quito	Road race
Bronze medal – third place	2012 Mar del Plata	Road race
Military World Games
Gold medal – first place	2015 Mungyeong	Team road race
Bronze medal – third place	2015 Mungyeong	Road race

Janildes Fernandes Silva (born 23 August 1980) is a Brazilian road bicycle racer. She competed at the 2012 Summer Olympics in the Women's road race, but failed to finish, having finished in 49th and 54th at the 2000 and 2004 Summer Olympics respectively. In 2015, she won the Tour Femenino de San Luis.

== Major results ==
1998
1st Prova Ciclística 9 de Julho
1999
1st Prova Ciclística 9 de Julho
Pan American Games

3rd Road race
9th Time trial

2000
1st Prova Ciclística 9 de Julho
2002
3rd Road race, Pan American Road Championships
2003
1st Copa América de Ciclismo
Pan American Games

2nd Road race
8th Time trial

2004
1st Copa da Republica de Ciclismo
2005
3rd Copa América de Ciclismo
2006
2nd Road race, South American Games
5th Copa América de Ciclismo
7th Overall Novilon Internationale Damesronde van Drenthe
9th GP Liberazione
2007
National Road Championships

1st Time trial
2nd Road race

Pan American Road and Track Championships

3rd Scratch
5th Road race

2008
1st Copa da Republica de Ciclismo
Vuelta a El Salvador

1st Points classification
1st Stage 3

3rd Time trial, National Road Championships
4th Copa América de Ciclismo
6th Road race, Pan American Road Championships
2009
1st Road race, National Road Championships
1st Copa América de Ciclismo
4th Road race, Pan American Road Championships
2010
1st Road race, National Road Championships
South American Games

2nd Individual pursuit
3rd Scratch
3rd Team pursuit

2011
National Road Championships

2nd Road race
3rd Time trial

2012
1st Copa Federacion Venezolana de Ciclismo Corre por la Vida
3rd Road race, Pan American Road Championships
2014
National Track Championships

1st Omnium
1st Scratch

3rd Time trial, National Road Championships
10th Road race, Pan American Road Championships
2015
Military World Games

1st Team road race
3rd Road race

1st Overall Tour Femenino de San Luis
4th Gran Prix San Luis Femenino
7th Road race, Pan American Road Championships
2016
1st Copa Federación Venezolana de Ciclismo
9th Clasico FVCiclismo Corre Por la VIDA
2019
7th Overall Tour Femenino de Venezuela II
