= Nilceu Aparecido dos Santos =

Brazilian racing cyclist (born 1977)

Nilceu Santos
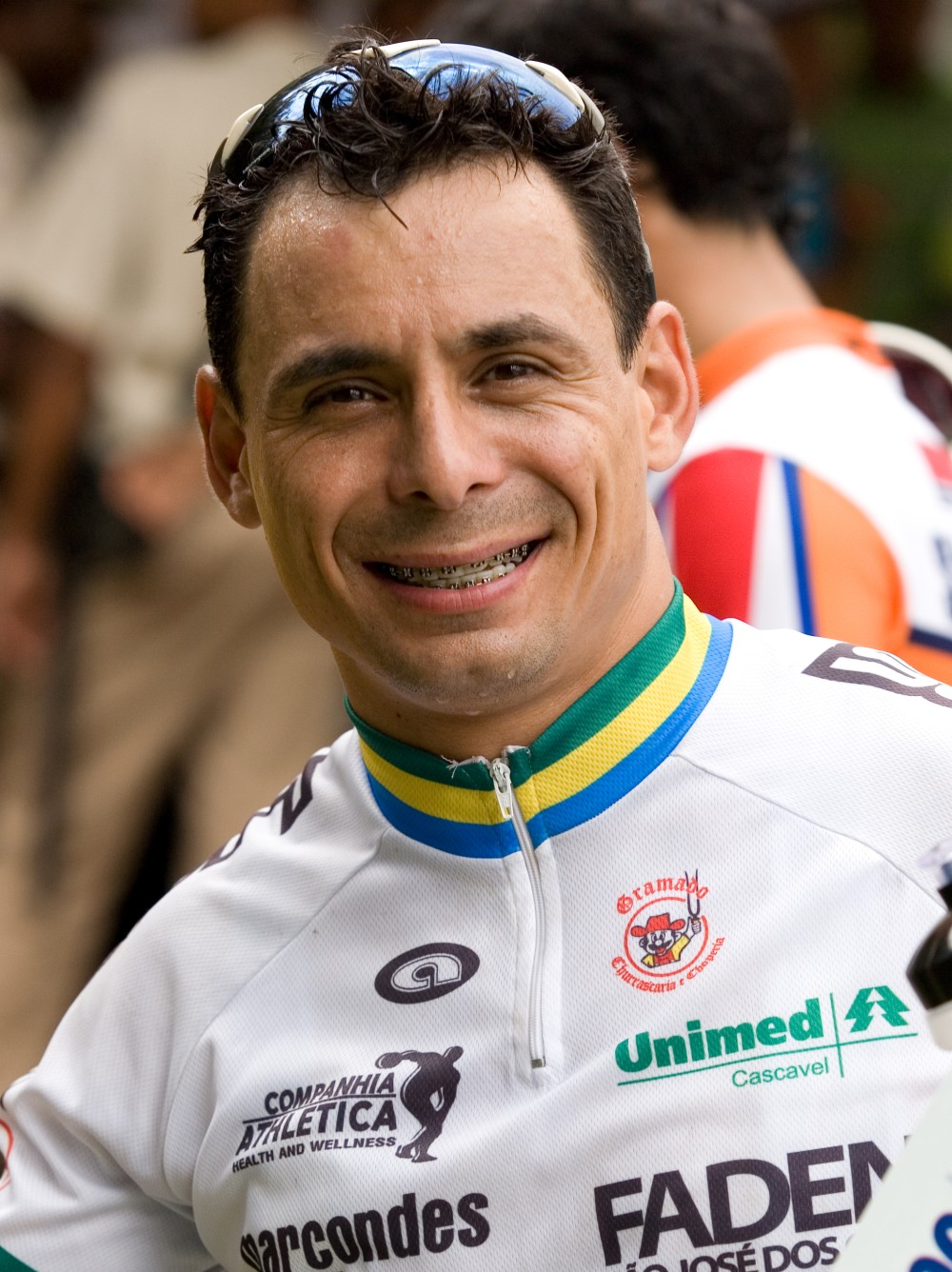

Personal information
- Full name: Nilceu Aparecido dos Santos
- Nickname: The Flash
- Born: July 14, 1977 (age 49) Cascavel, Brazil
- Height: 170 cm (5 ft 7 in)
- Weight: 70 kg (154 lb)

Cycling career
- Sport: Cycling
- Current team: Retired
- Discipline: Road
- Role: Rider
- Rider type: Sprinter

Amateur teams
- 2004: Memorial–Santos
- 2005–2006: Scott–Marcondes Cesar–São José dos Campos

Professional teams
- 2007–2008: Scott–Marcondes Cesar–São José dos Campos
- 2010: Scott–Marcondes Cesar–São José dos Campos
- 2011–2013: Funvic–Pindamonhangaba
- 2014: Clube DataRo de Ciclismo–Bottecchia

Major wins
- National Road Race Championships (2007)

Nilceu Aparecido dos Santos (born July 14, 1977, in Cascavel) is a Brazilian former professional racing cyclist.

== Major results ==
2001
1st Prova Ciclística 9 de Julho
2002
1st Stages 2 & 5 Volta do Rio de Janeiro
3rd Copa América de Ciclismo
2004
1st Prova Ciclística 9 de Julho
1st Stage 3 Tour de Santa Catarina
2005
1st Copa América de Ciclismo
1st Stage 1 Volta de São Paulo
2nd Road race, National Road Championships
2nd Overall Volta Do ABC Paulista
2nd Copa da Republica de Ciclismo
3rd Prova Ciclística 9 de Julho
2006
1st Copa América de Ciclismo
1st Prova Ciclistica 1° de Maio
1st Stages 1, 8, 9 & 10 Tour de Santa Catarina (BRA)
1st Stage 2 Volta de Porto Alegre
1st Stage 9 Volta de São Paulo
2007
1st Road race, National Road Championships
1st Copa América de Ciclismo
1st Overall Torneio de Verão

1st Stages 2, 3 & 4

1st Stage 5 Volta do Rio de Janeiro
1st Stage 1 Volta de São Paulo
1st Stage 1 Tour de Santa Catarina
1st Copa da Republica de Ciclismo
2008
1st Copa América de Ciclismo
3rd Overall Torneio de Verão

1st Stages 1 & 3

2009
1st Overall Torneio de Verão

1st Stage 1

2nd Copa América de Ciclismo
2010
1st Stage 5 Giro do Interior de São Paulo
2nd Prova Ciclística 9 de Julho
2011
2nd Overall Torneio de Verão

1st Stage 5

2012
2nd Overall Torneio de Verão

1st Stage 1

3rd Copa América de Ciclismo
2013
2nd Copa América de Ciclismo
2014
1st Stage 8 Tour do Brasil
