= Fabielle Mota =

Brazilian cyclist (born 1978)

Fabielle Dos Santos Mota (born September 12, 1978) is a male professional racing cyclist from Brazil.

== Career highlights ==
2005
1st in Stage 4 500 Millas del Norte, Tacuarembo (URU)
1st in Stage 7 500 Millas del Norte, Artigas (URU)
3rd in Prova Ciclistica 1° de Maio - GP Ayrton Senna (BRA)
3rd in Internacional de ciclismo (BRA)
2006
1st in Stage 3 Torneio de Verao (BRA)
1st in Stage 5 Volta Ciclistica de Porto Alegre, Porto Alegre (BRA)
2nd in Copa Promoson (BRA)
2007
3rd in Copa da Republica de Ciclismo (BRA)
1st in Stage 5 Torneio de Verao, Portuaria (BRA)
3rd in Circuito Boavista (BRA)
1st in Stage 4 Volta do Rio de Janeiro, Campos (BRA)
1st in Stage 9 Volta de Ciclismo Internacional do Estado de São Paulo, Campinas (BRA)
1st in Copa Promoson, Varingha (BRA)
1st in Stage 3 Volta de Goias, Caldas Novas (BRA)
1st in Stage 5 Volta de Goias (BRA)
2nd in General Classification Volta de Goias (BRA)
2nd in Goiânia (BRA)
2008
3rd in Copa América de Ciclismo, São Paulo (BRA)
