= Márcio May =

Brazilian cyclist (born 1972)

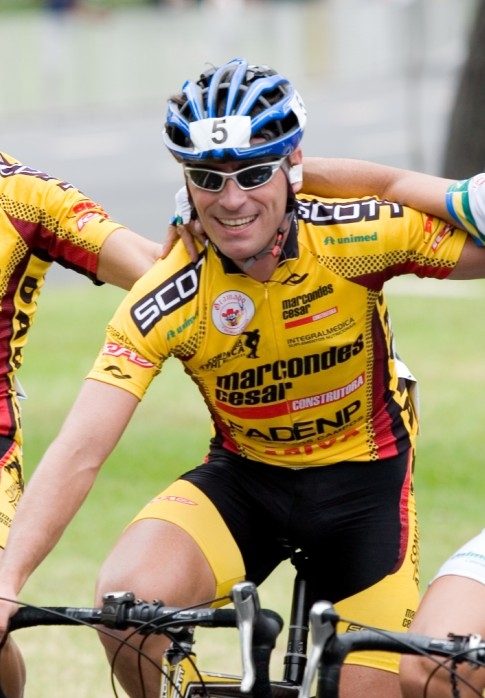

Personal information
- Full name: Márcio May
- Born: 22 May 1972 (age 54) Salete, Brazil
- Height: 1.79 m (5 ft 10 in)
- Weight: 72 kg (159 lb)

Cycling career
- Sport: Cycling
- Current team: FMD Rio do Sul–Royal Ciclo–Dalthon
- Discipline: Road
- Role: Rider

Amateur teams
- 2016: Avulso
- 2023: Avulso
- 2024–: FMD Rio do Sul–Royal Ciclo–Dalthon

Professional teams
- 1987: ACAVI–Salete
- 1988–1990: Schlösser–Brusque
- 1991–1992: Metalciclo–Rio do Sul
- 1992–1996: Caloi–São Paulo
- 1997: Caloi–Petrobrás–São Paulo
- 1998–1999: Caloi–Paraná
- 2000–2004: Memorial-Santos
- 2005–2008: Scott–Marcondes Cesar–São José dos Campos

Márcio May (born 22 May 1972) is a Brazilian road bicycle and track cyclist, who competed in three Summer Olympics (1992, 1996 and 2004) for his native country. He won two bronze medals during his career at the Pan American Games (1995 and 1999). May retired from professional cycling in January 2008. His last race was the Copa América de Ciclismo, in which he rode for the Scott–Marcondes Cesar–São José dos Campos team. He returned to racing at the amateur level in 2016, and currently rides for club team FMD Rio do Sul–Royal Ciclo–Dalthon.

== Major results ==
1995
3rd Team pursuit, Pan American Games
1997
1st Overall Tour de Santa Catarina
1998
1st Overall Tour de Santa Catarina
1999
3rd Time trial, Pan American Games
2000
2nd Time trial, Pan American Road Championships
3rd Overall Tour de Santa Catarina
2001
2nd Time trial, National Road Championships
2002
1st Stage 6 Vuelta Ciclista de Chile
2nd Overall Tour do Rio

1st Stage 3

2nd Overall Tour de Santa Catarina

1st Prologue

2003
National Road Championships

2nd Time trial
3rd Road race

3rd Overall Tour de Santa Catarina
2004
1st Overall Tour do Rio

1st Stage 2

2005
1st Overall Tour de Santa Catarina

1st Stage 4

2nd Time trial, National Road Championships
2nd Overall Volta Ciclística de Porto Alegre
5th Overall Volta de Ciclismo Internacional do Estado de São Paulo
2006
1st Overall Volta do Paraná

1st Stage 1

9th Overall Tour de Santa Catarina
2007
1st Stage 1 (TTT) Tour de Santa Catarina
10th Overall Volta do Paraná
