= Rodrigo Brito =

Chilean footballer (born 1983)

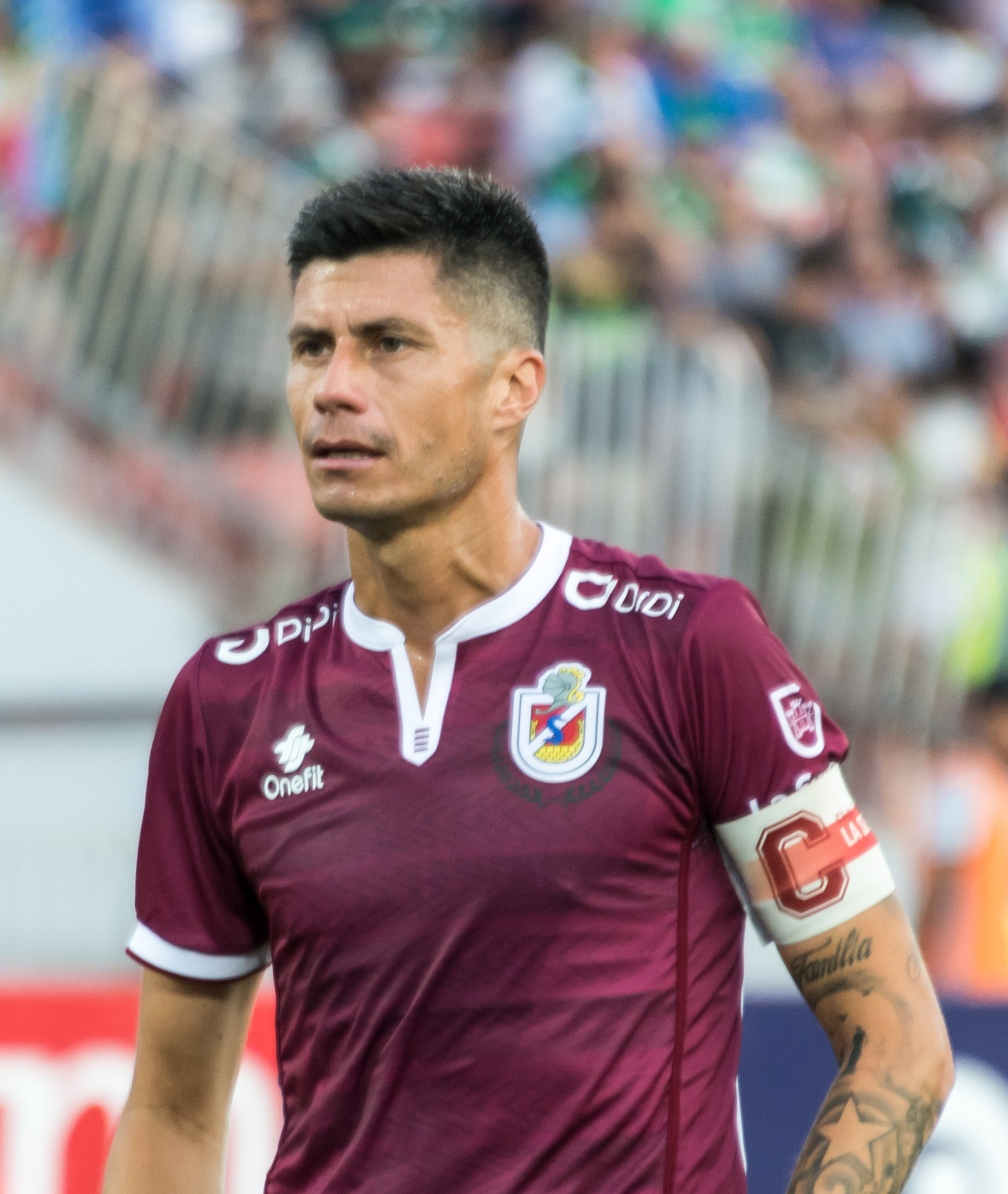
- Brito with Deportes La Serena in 2020

Personal information
- Full name: Rodrigo Andrés Brito Tobar
- Date of birth: 23 February 1983 (age 43)
- Place of birth: Santiago, Chile
- Height: 1.85 m (6 ft 1 in)
- Position: Centre-back

Youth career
- Academia Santa Inés
- Deportes La Serena

Senior career*
Years	Team	Apps	(Gls)
2005–2008	Deportes La Serena	48	(0)
2009	Curicó Unido	4	(0)
2010–2014	Deportes Iquique	103	(5)
2014–2015	Rangers	35	(3)
2015–2022	Deportes La Serena	150	(3)
2023–2024	Deportes Limache	28	(0)
Total		368	(11)
- * Club domestic league appearances and goals

Rodrigo Andrés Brito Tobar (born 23 February 1983) is a Chilean former footballer who played as a centre-back.

== Career ==
A historical player of both Deportes La Serena and Deportes Iquique, he left the first at the end of the 2022 season and joined Deportes Limache for 2023, winning the league title.

It was confirmed his retirement in November 2025.

== Honours ==
Deportes Iquique

- Copa Chile: 2010
- Primera B: 2010

Deportes Limache

- Segunda División Profesional: 2023
