= Tour de Santa Catarina =

Race details
- Region: Santa Catarina, Brazil. (South America)
- English name: Tour of Santa Catarina
- Competition: UCI America Tour 2.2
- Type: Stage race

History
- First edition: 1987
- Editions: 27 (as of 2026)
- First winner: Cássio Freitas (BRA)
- Most wins: Márcio May (BRA) (4 wins)
- Most recent: Javier Jamaica (COL)

The Tour de Santa Catarina (also Volta Ciclística Internacional de Santa Catarina – Portuguese for International Cycling Tour of Santa Catarina) is a multi-stage road bicycle racing event held in the state of Santa Catarina, in the south of Brazil. The first edition was held in 1987. The competition is famous for the traditional mountain stage at Serra do Rio do Rastro, which is one of Brazil's toughest climbs with an average gradient of 10% over an extent of 7 km. The competition is part of the UCI America Tour.

The 21st edition of the race occurred from 15 to 25 November 2007, and featured 11 stages.

The 2008 edition was postponed due to a flood in the region in which the race was scheduled to take place. A shortened event occurred from 22 to 26 April 2009, replacing the missed edition in the 2008-2009 UCI America Tour. This edition featured only 5 stages over 486 km. A regular edition is expected to take place still in 2009, after September, as part of the 2009–2010 UCI America Tour.

== Past winners ==
Year	Winner	Total Distance
1987	(Brazil) Cássio Freitas	653 km
1988	(Brazil) Wanderley Magalhães	544 km
1989	(Brazil) César Daneliczen	713 km
1990	(Brazil) César Daneliczen	794 km
1991	(Brazil) Wanderley Magalhães	747 km
1992	(Brazil) Hernandes Cuadri	1,085 km
1993	(Brazil) Gabriel Sabbião	1,234 km
1994	(Brazil) José Aparecido dos Santos	1,250 km
1995	(Brazil) Hernandes Cuadri	1,000 km
1996	(Brazil) Daniel Rogelim	1,130 km
1997	(Brazil) Márcio May	891 km
1998	(Brazil) Márcio May	892 km
1999	(Brazil) Daniel Rogelim	826 km
2000	(Brazil) Cássio Freitas	961.6 km
2001	(Brazil) Cássio Freitas	944.4 km
2002	(Brazil) Márcio May	821.2 km
2003	(Brazil) Antônio Nascimento	751.8 km
2004	(Argentina) Matías Médici	1,051 km
2005	(Brazil) Márcio May	673 km
2006	(Brazil) Pedro Nicacio	1,043 km
2007	(Brazil) Alex Correia Diniz	1,143 km
2009	(Brazil) Douglas Moi Bueno	486 km
2010	(Colombia) Stiber Ortiz	619 km
2011– 2012	No race	
2013	(Brazil) Otávio Bulgarelli	553 km
2014– 2015	No race	
2016	(Colombia) Ramiro Rincón	
2017– 2024	No race	
2025	(Colombia) Diego Camargo	
2026	(Colombia) Javier Jamaica	
