= Scott–Marcondes Cesar–São José dos Campos =

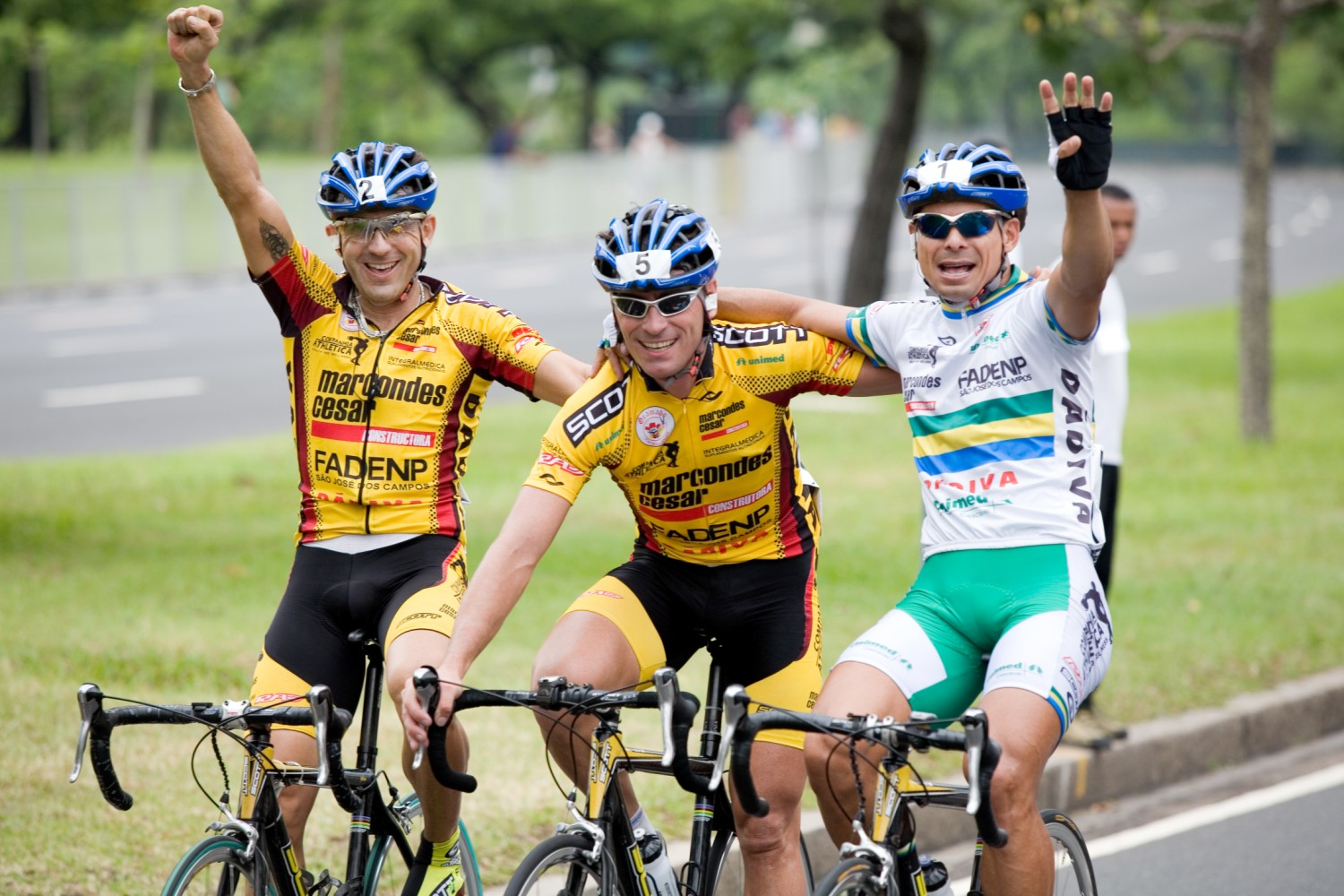

Team information
- UCI code: SCF
- Registered: Brazil
- Founded: 1993
- Discipline: Road
- Status: UCI Professional Continental

Key personnel
- General manager: José Carlos Monteiro

Team name history
Jersey

Team Scott–Marcondes Cesar–São José dos Campos (UCI team code: SCF) was a Brazilian UCI Continental road bicycle racing team, based on São José dos Campos. The team was created in 1993 by José Carlos Monteiro, who is the general team manager since its foundation. After a financial struggle in the first half of 2009 which included not paying up to 6 months of some rides salaries, the team secured a Professional Continental licence for 2010. However, further financial difficulties, including lack of payment to its rides, resulted in the teams suspension by the UCI from August 2010 and onwards. In November 2010 it was revealed that the teams bank guarantee, which is required by all Pro Continental teams, was a counterfeit and no money had been deposited.

== Major wins ==
2007
Copa América de Ciclismo, Nilceu Santos
Brazil National Road Championship, Nilceu Santos
Brazil National Individual Time-Trial Championship, Pedro Nicacio
Overall and U23 Tour de Santa Catarina, Alex Diniz

2008
Copa América de Ciclismo, Nilceu Santos
U23 Tour de San Luis, Magno Nazaret
Overall Torneio de Verão, Daniel Rogelim

2009
Copa América de Ciclismo, Francisco Chamorro
Team Time Trial Prologue Volta de Ciclismo Internacional do Estado de São Paulo

== Notable team members ==
| Rider | Date of birth |
|---|---|
| Francisco Chamorro (ARG) | August 7, 1981 (age 45) |
| Jorge Giacinti (ARG) | June 21, 1974 (age 52) |
| Matías Médici (ARG) | June 29, 1975 (age 51) |
| Magno Nazaret (BRA) | January 17, 1986 (age 40) |
| Luciano Pagliarini (BRA) | April 18, 1978 (age 48) |
| Daniel Rogelim (BRA) | October 13, 1972 (age 53) |
| Renato Ruiz (BRA) | July 9, 1981 (age 45) |
| Nilceu Santos (BRA) | July 14, 1977 (age 49) |
| Andrei Sartassov (RUS) | November 10, 1975 (age 50) |
