= 2023 national road cycling championships =

The 2023 national road cycling championships are being held throughout the year and are organised by the UCI member federations. They began in Australia with the Australian National Road Race Championships events on 7 January.

== Jerseys ==
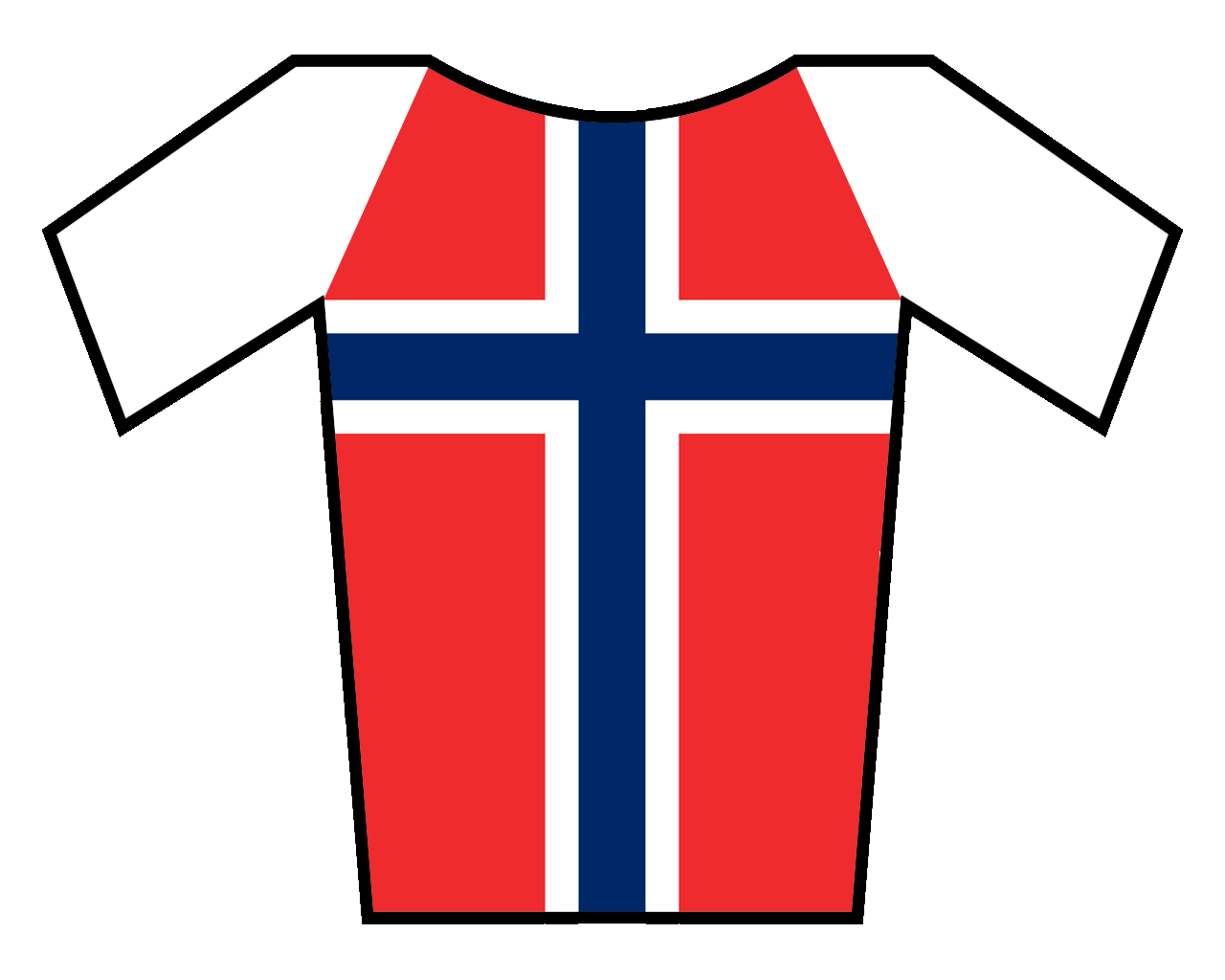
Norwegian Champion

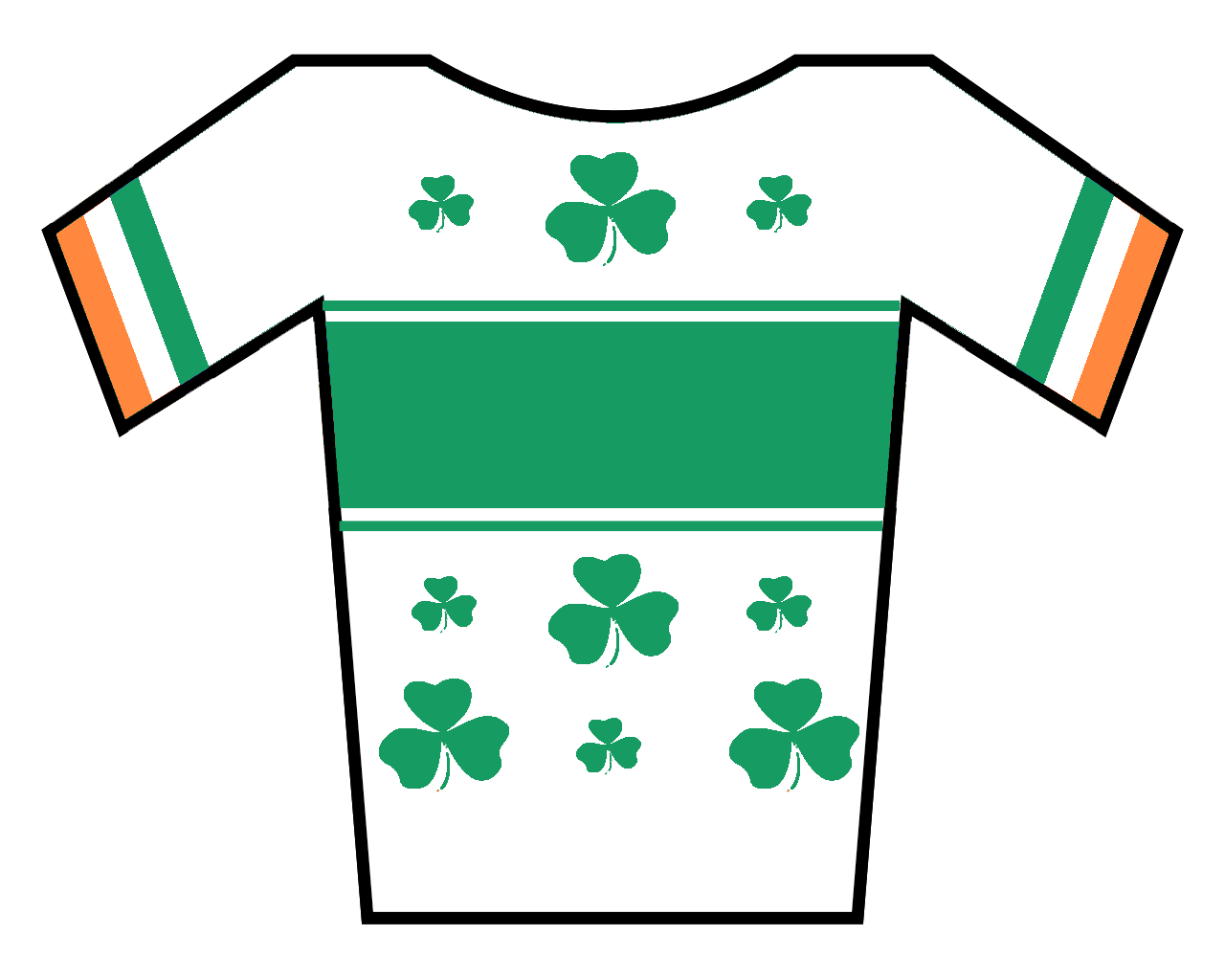
Irish Champion

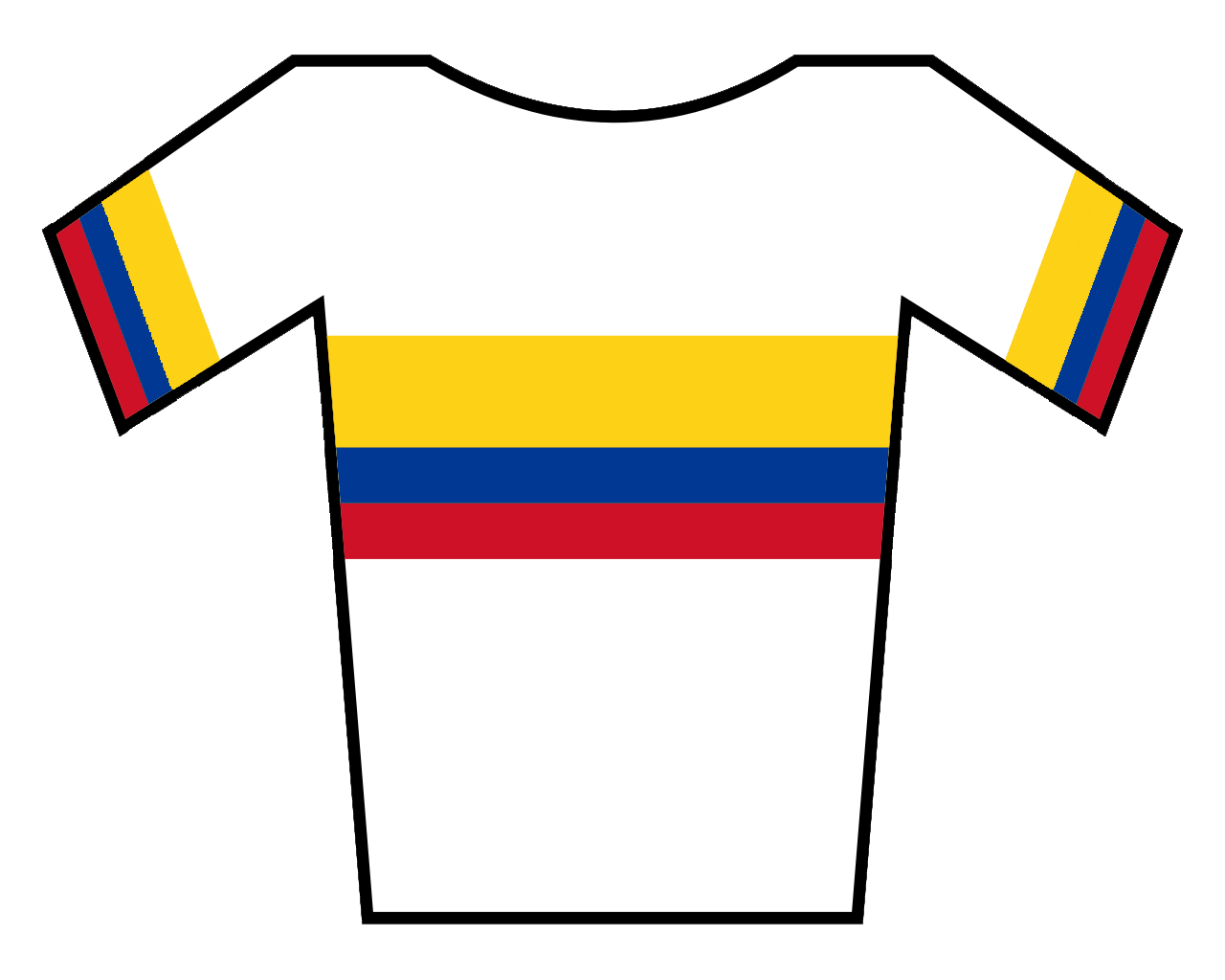
Colombian
Champion

The winner of each national championship wears the national jersey in all their races for the next year in the respective discipline, apart from the World Championships and the Olympics, or unless they are wearing a classification leader's jersey in a stage race. Most national champion jerseys tend to represent a country's flag or use the colours from it. Jerseys may also feature traditional sporting colours of a country that are not derived from a national flag, such as the green and gold jerseys of Australian national champions, or add some distinctive national element, such as the shamrocks on the jerseys of Irish national champions.

== 2023 champions ==
=== Men's Elite ===
Country	Men's Elite Road Race Champion	Road Race Champion's Team	Men's Elite Time Trial Champion	Time Trial Champion's Team
Albania	Lukas Kloppenborg		Ylber Sefa	Vetrapo B-Close Cycling Team
Algeria	Abdelraouf Bengayou		Youcef Reguigui	Terengganu Polygon Cycling Team
Angola	Igor Silva	Jair Transporte de Benguela	Dário António	Amadores Cicloturismo
Antigua and Barbuda	Jyme Bridges		Robert Marsh	East Side Raiders
Argentina	Alejandro Durán	Chimbas Te Quiero	Sergio Fredes	KTM Orange Road
Argentina	Sergio Fredes	KTM Orange Road	Sergio Fredes	KTM Orange Road
Australia	Luke Plapp	Ineos Grenadiers	Jay Vine	UAE Team Emirates
Austria	Gregor Mühlberger	Movistar Team	Patrick Gamper	Bora–Hansgrohe
Azerbaijan	Ali Gurbianov	Sakarya BB Pro Team	Samir Jabrayilov	
Bahamas	Kevin Daley		Kevin Daley	
Barbados	Edwin Sutherland		Joshua Kelly	Miami Blazers
Belarus	Yauhen Sobal	Minsk Cycling Club	Yauheni Karaliok	Minsk Cycling Club
Belgium	Remco Evenepoel	Soudal–Quick-Step	Wout van Aert	Team Jumbo–Visma
Belize	Cory Williams	L39ION of Los Angeles	Oscar Quiroz	Miami Blazers
Benin	Emmanuel Sagbo	Espoir Vélo Club	Rémi Sowou	Turbo Vélo Club
Bermuda	Kaden Hopkins	Vendée U Pays de la Loire	Kaden Hopkins	Vendée U Pays de la Loire
Bolivia	Freddy González	Pío Rico - Alcaldía La Vega	Eduardo Moyata	Pío Rico - Alcaldía La Vega
Bosnia and Herzegovina	Husein Selimović	Kamen Pazin	Vedad Karic	Kamen Pazin
Botswana	Thata Lloyd Molale	Swift BW		
Brazil	Caio Godoy	Localiza Meoo / Swift Pro Cycling	Diego de Jesus Mendes	Pedali Bike Store
British Virgin Islands	Phillippe Leroy		Phillippe Leroy	
Bulgaria	Yordan Andreev	Sidi Ali–Unlock Sports Team	Martin Papanov	
Burkina Faso	Paul Daumont	AS Bessel		
Cameroon	Artuce Tella	SNH Vélo Club		
Canada	Nickolas Zukowsky	Q36.5 Pro Cycling Team	Derek Gee	Israel–Premier Tech
Cape Verde	Nélio Cruz		Eliezer Soares	
Cayman Islands	Michael Testori		Michael Testori	
Chile	Manuel Lira	Team Papa John's	José Luis Rodríguez Aguilar	Localiza Meoo / Swift Pro Cycling
China	Ma Binyan	Hengxiang Cycling Team	Xue Ming	
Colombia	Esteban Chaves	EF Education–EasyPost	Miguel Ángel López	Team Medellín–EPM
Costa Rica	Jason Huertas	Colono - Bikestation - Clips	Donovan Ramirez	7C Economy Lacoinex
Croatia	Viktor Potočki	Pogi Team Gusto Ljubljana	Fran Miholjević	Team Bahrain Victorious
Cuba	Ricardo Delgado		Leandro Marcos	
Curaçao	Danny van Ommen			
Cyprus	Alexandros Matsangos	Omónia	Andreas Miltiadis	Java Kiwi Atlántico
Czech Republic	Mathias Vacek	Lidl–Trek	Jakub Otruba	ATT Investments
Democratic Republic of the Congo	Joël Kasereka			
Denmark	Mattias Skjelmose	Lidl–Trek	Kasper Asgreen	Soudal–Quick-Step
Dominican Republic	Pablo Alcides Reyes	Verrazano Cycling Team	Erlin García	CRCA/Foundation Elite Team
Ecuador	Richard Carapaz	EF Education–EasyPost	Jonathan Caicedo	EF Education–EasyPost
El Salvador	José Joya		Gregory Guardado	
Eritrea	Awet Aman	Denden Cycling Club	Amanuel Ghebreigzabhier	Lidl–Trek
Ethiopia	Bizay Tesfu Redae		Tsgabu Grmay	Team Jayco–AlUla
Estonia	Karl Patrick Lauk	Wagner Bazin WB	Rein Taaramäe	Intermarché–Circus–Wanty
Eswatini	Kwanele Jele			
Fiji	Don Younger		Jobe Tapake	
Finland	Antti-Jussi Juntunen	Parkhotel Valkenburg	Vladyslav Makogon	GIF-Chebici
France	Valentin Madouas	Groupama–FDJ	Rémi Cavagna	Soudal–Quick-Step
Georgia	Giorgi Suvadzoglu		Avtandil Piranishvili	
Germany	Emanuel Buchmann	Bora–Hansgrohe	Nils Politt	Bora–Hansgrohe
Ghana	Michael Naba	FCG Cycling club		
Greece	Georgios Bouglas	Matrix Powertag	Miltiadis Giannoutsos	
Grenada	Red Walters	X-Speed United	Red Walters	X-Speed United
Guatemala	Adolfo Vásquez	Hino-One-La Red-Suzuki	Manuel Rodas	Decorabaños - Asociación de Quetzaltenango
Guyana	Briton John	Team We Stand United	Curtis Dey	KFC Evolution
Honduras	Cristopher Jair Díaz	Arabay Vas Team	César Castillo	ACT
Hong Kong	Pak Hang Ng	HKSI Pro Cycling Team	Lau Wan Yau	HKSI Pro Cycling Team
Hungary	Attila Valter	Team Jumbo–Visma	Attila Valter	Team Jumbo–Visma
Iceland	Ingvar Ómarsson		Davíð Jónsson	
India	Pratik Patil	Maharashtra Cycling Team	Naveen John	Karnataka Cycling Team
Indonesia	Terry Kusuma	Kelapa Geding Bikers	Aiman Cahyadi	Terengganu Polygon Cycling Team
Iran	Saeid Safarzadeh	Qinghai Tianyoude Hotel Cycling Team	Saeid Safarzadeh	Qinghai Tianyoude Hotel Cycling Team
Ireland	Ben Healy	EF Education–EasyPost	Ryan Mullen	Bora–Hansgrohe
Israel	Itamar Einhorn	Israel–Premier Tech	Oded Kogut	Israel Premier Tech Academy
Italy	Simone Velasco	Astana Qazaqstan Team	Filippo Ganna	Ineos Grenadiers
Ivory Coast	Issiaka Cissé	Société Omnisports de l'Armée		
Jamaica	Jerome Forrest		Barrington Bailey	
Japan	Masaki Yamamoto	JCL Team Ukyo	Yuma Koishi	JCL Team Ukyo
Kazakhstan	Alexey Lutsenko	Astana Qazaqstan Team	Alexey Lutsenko	Astana Qazaqstan Team
Kosovo	Blerton Nuha		Samir Hasani	
Laos	Ariya Phounsavath	Roojai Online Insurance	Ariya Phounsavath	Roojai Online Insurance
Latvia	Emīls Liepiņš	Lidl–Trek	Toms Skujiņš	Lidl–Trek
Lebanon	Gilbert Hannouche	Aliyah Cycling Club	Nizar Elkadi	
Lesotho	Kabelo Makatile			
Lithuania	Rokas Adomaitis	Voltas–Tartu 2024 by CCN	Aivaras Mikutis	Tudor Pro Cycling Team
Luxembourg	Alex Kirsch	Lidl–Trek	Alex Kirsch	Lidl–Trek
Madagascar	Jean de Dieu Rakotondrasoa			
Malaysia	Nur Aiman Mohd Zariff	Terengganu Polygon Cycling Team	Nur Aiman Rosli	Malaysia Pro Cycling
Mali	Yacouba Diallo	CC Airness de Niena		
Malta	Aidan Buttigieg	Blackshaw Racing	Aidan Buttigieg	Blackshaw Racing
Mauritius	Christopher Lagane		Christopher Lagane	
Mexico	Édgar Cadena	Canel's–Java	Ignacio Prado	Canel's–Java
Moldova	Laurențiu Buianu	Trentino Cycling Team U23	Gennady Morgun	
Mongolia	Jambaljamts Sainbayar	Terengganu Polygon Cycling Team	Maral-Erdene Batmunkh	Levante Fuji Shizuoka
Montenegro	Aleksandar Radunović	BK Dinamo	Goran Cerović	PV Cycling Team
Morocco	Achraf Ed Doghmy	Kawkab AC	Adil El Arbaoui	AVC Khouribga
Namibia	Tristan de Lange		Drikus Coetzee	
Netherlands	Dylan van Baarle	Team Jumbo–Visma	Jos van Emden	Team Jumbo–Visma
New Zealand	James Oram	Bolton Equities Black Spoke	Aaron Gate	Bolton Equities Black Spoke
Nigeria	Krotimi Abaka			
Nicaragua	Argenis Vanegas	Team Kilos	Argenis Vanegas	Team Kilos
North Macedonia	Aleksandar Miloshevski		Darko Simonovski	VK Enerdži
Norway	Fredrik Dversnes	Uno-X Pro Cycling Team	Søren Wærenskjold	Uno-X Pro Cycling Team
Pakistan	Khan Mohsin		Shahwali Ali	
Panama	Randish Lorenzo	Panamá es Cultura y Valores	Bolívar Espinosa	Panamá es Cultura y Valores
Paraguay	Francisco Daniel Riveros		Francisco Daniel Riveros	
Peru	Robinson Ruiz	Team Epic Pro Riders	Alain Quispe	Explora Sports Cycling Team
Philippines	Jonel Carcueva	Go for Gold Philippines	Rustom Lim	Go for Gold Philippines
Poland	Alan Banaszek	Human Powered Health	Michał Kwiatkowski	Ineos Grenadiers
Portugal	Ivo Oliveira	UAE Team Emirates	João Almeida	UAE Team Emirates
Puerto Rico	Cristopher Morales		Cristopher Morales	
Qatar	Bilal Alsaadi		Ahmed Al-Bardiny	Team Doha Cycling
Republic of China	Shih Hsin Hsiao		Sergio Tu	Team Bahrain Victorious
Romania	Serghei Țvetcov	Denver Disruptors	Eduard-Michael Grosu	HRE Mazowsze Serce Polski
Russia	Andrei Stepanov		Petr Rikunov	
Rwanda	Patrick Byukusenge	Benediction Club	Moise Mugisha	Benediction Club
Saint Lucia	Kluivert Mitchel		Kluivert Mitchel	
Saint Vincent and the Grenadines	Zefal Bailey		Cammie Adams	
Senegal	Saliou Ndour			
Serbia	Dušan Rajović	Team Bahrain Victorious	Ognjen Ilić	BK Borac Čačak
Singapore	Yong Liang Mun		Yong Liang Mun	
Slovakia	Matúš Štoček	ATT Investments	Matúš Štoček	ATT Investments
Slovenia	Tadej Pogačar	UAE Team Emirates	Tadej Pogačar	UAE Team Emirates
South Africa	Travis Stedman	Q36.5 Continental Team	Stefan de Bod	EF Education–EasyPost
South Korea	Park Keon-woo	LX Cycling Team	Jang Kyung-gu	
Spain	Oier Lazkano	Movistar Team	Jonathan Castroviejo	Ineos Grenadiers
Sweden	Lucas Eriksson	Tudor Pro Cycling Team	Jacob Ahlsson	Motala AIF Serneke Allebike
Switzerland	Marc Hirschi	UAE Team Emirates	Stefan Bissegger	EF Education–EasyPost
Tanzania	Frank Malick	Dar el Salaam	Hassan Sharif	Tanga
Thailand	Noppachai Klahan	Thailand Continental Cycling Team	Peerapol Chawchiangkwang	Thailand Continental Cycling Team
Trinidad and Tobago	Maurice Burnette		Akil Campbell	PSL
Tunisia	Maher Habouriya	Iraq Cycling Project	Mohamed Aziz Dellai	
Turkey	Burak Abay	Konya Büyükşehir Belediyespor	Ahmet Örken	Spor Toto Cycling Team
Ukraine	Maksym Bilyi		Vitalii Novakovskyi	GUSTO Superteam Soukesports
United Arab Emirates	Ahmed Al Mansoori		Saif Al Kaabi	
United Kingdom	Fred Wright	Team Bahrain Victorious	Joshua Tarling	Ineos Grenadiers
United States	Quinn Simmons	Lidl–Trek	Brandon McNulty	UAE Team Emirates
United States Virgin Islands	Stephen Swanton		Stephen Swanton	
Uruguay	Leonel Rodríguez	Club Ciclista Cerro Largo	Eric Fagúndez	Burgos BH
Uzbekistan	Dmitriy Bocharov	Samarkand Professional Cycling Team	Aleksey Fomovskiy	Samarkand Professional Cycling Team
Venezuela	Orluis Aular	Caja Rural–Seguros RGA	Orluis Aular	Caja Rural–Seguros RGA
Vietnam	Trịnh Đức Tâm		Nguyễn Tuấn Vũ	
Zambia	Obert Chembe	Red Arrows Cycling Club	Yanjanani Sakala	Twin Palm Bike Club
Zimbabwe	Rodrick Shumba		Mthokozisi Sibanda	

==== Champions in UCI Men's teams ====
UCI WorldTeams
Team	Road Race Champions	Time Trial Champions
AG2R Citroën Team		
Alpecin–Deceuninck		
Arkéa–Samsic		
Astana Qazaqstan Team	Simone Velasco (ITA); Alexey Lutsenko (KAZ)	Alexey Lutsenko (KAZ)
Bora–Hansgrohe	Emanuel Buchmann (GER)	Patrick Gamper (AUT); Nils Politt (GER); Ryan Mullen (IRL)
Cofidis		
EF Education–EasyPost	Esteban Chaves (COL); Richard Carapaz (ECU); Ben Healy (IRL)	Jonathan Caicedo (ECU); Stefan de Bod (RSA); Stefan Bissegger (SUI)
Groupama–FDJ	Valentin Madouas (FRA)	
Ineos Grenadiers	Luke Plapp (AUS)	Jonathan Castroviejo (ESP); Joshua Tarling (GBR); Filippo Ganna (ITA); Michał Kwiatkowski (POL)
Intermarché–Circus–Wanty		Rein Taaramäe (EST)
Lidl–Trek	Mathias Vacek (CZE); Mattias Skjelmose (DEN); Emīls Liepiņš (LAT); Alex Kirsch (LUX); Quinn Simmons (USA)	Amanuel Ghebreigzabhier (ERI); Toms Skujiņš (LAT); Alex Kirsch (LUX)
Movistar Team	Gregor Mühlberger (AUT); Oier Lazkano (ESP)	
Soudal–Quick-Step	Remco Evenepoel (BEL)	Kasper Asgreen (DEN); Rémi Cavagna (FRA)
Team Bahrain Victorious	Fred Wright (GBR); Dušan Rajović (SRB)	Fran Miholjević (CRO); Sergio Tu (TPE)
Team Jayco–AlUla		Tsgabu Grmay (ETH)
Team dsm–firmenich		
Team Jumbo–Visma	Attila Valter (HUN); Dylan van Baarle (NED)	Wout van Aert (BEL); Attila Valter (HUN); Jos van Emden (NED)
UAE Team Emirates	Ivo Oliveira (POR); Tadej Pogačar (SLO); Marc Hirschi (SUI)	Jay Vine (AUS); João Almeida (POR); Tadej Pogačar (SLO); Brandon McNulty (USA)

UCI ProTeams
Team	Road Race Champions	Time Trial Champions
Bingoal WB	Karl Patrick Lauk (EST)	
Bolton Equities Black Spoke	James Oram (NZL)	Aaron Gate (NZL)
Burgos BH		Eric Fagundez (URU)
Caja Rural–Seguros RGA	Orluis Aular (VEN)	Orluis Aular (VEN)
Eolo–Kometa		
Equipo Kern Pharma		
Euskaltel–Euskadi		
Green Project–Bardiani–CSF–Faizanè		
Human Powered Health	Alan Banaszek (POL)	
Israel–Premier Tech	Itamar Einhorn (ISR)	Derek Gee (CAN)
Lotto–Dstny		
Q36.5 Pro Cycling Team	Nickolas Zukowsky (CAN)	
Team Corratec–Selle Italia		
Team Flanders–Baloise		
Team Novo Nordisk		
Team TotalEnergies		
Tudor Pro Cycling Team	Lucas Eriksson (SWE)	
Uno-X Pro Cycling Team	Fredrik Dversnes (NOR)	Søren Wærenskjold (NOR)

=== Women's Elite ===
Country	Women's Elite Road Race Champion	Road Race Champion's Team	Women's Elite Time Trial Champion	Time Trial Champion's Team
Algeria	Yasmine Elmeddah	Lyon Sprint Evolution	Khadidja Araoui	
Argentina	Micaela Gutiérrez	Buona Vita Team	Fernanda Yapura	Team Grand Est - Komugi - La Fabrique
Australia	Brodie Chapman	Lidl–Trek	Grace Brown	Arkéa–B&B Hotels
Austria	Carina Schrempf	Fenix-Deceuninck Continental	Anna Kiesenhofer	Israel Premier Tech Roland
Azerbaijan			Viktoriya Sidorenko	
Bahamas			Smobia Moreau	
Barbados	Amber Joseph	L39ION of Los Angeles	Amber Joseph	L39ION of Los Angeles
Belarus	Hanna Tserakh	Minsk Cycling Club	Hanna Tserakh	Minsk Cycling Club
Belgium	Lotte Kopecky	SD Worx	Lotte Kopecky	SD Worx
Belize	Kaya Cattouse	LA Sweat	Patricia Chavarria	
Benin	Hermione Ahouissou		Hermione Ahouissou	
Bermuda	Caitlin Conyers		Caitlin Conyers	
Bolivia	Elizabeth Vasquez	Bici Sprint	Abigail Sarabia	Team Sarabia
Bosnia and Herzegovina	Martina Čondra		Martina Čondra	
Brazil	Ana Vitória Magalhães	Bizkaia–Durango	Ana Paula Polegatch	Indaiatuba Cycling Team
British Virgin Islands	Olympia Maduro Fahie		Olympia Maduro Fahie	
Bulgaria	Viktoriya Danova		Iveta Kostadinova	
Burkina Faso	Lamoussa Zoungrana			
Cameroon	Presline Kengne			
Canada	Alison Jackson	EF Education–Tibco–SVB	Paula Findlay	
Chile	Karla Vallejos	Team Ruteros La Unión	Aranza Villalón	Eneicat–CMTeam–Seguros Deportivos
China	Zeng Luyao		Wang Tingting	
Colombia	Diana Peñuela	DNA Pro Cycling	Lina Hernández	Colombia Pacto por el Deporte
Costa Rica	Dixiana Quesada	Colono - Bikestation - Clips	Milagro Mena	Colono - Bikestation - Clips
Croatia	Majda Horvat		Mia Radotić	Cogeas-Mettler-Look Pro Cycling
Cuba	Arlenis Sierra	Movistar Team	Arlenis Sierra	Movistar Team
Cyprus	Antri Christoforou	Human Powered Health	Antri Christoforou	Human Powered Health
Czech Republic	Jarmila Machačová	Dukla Women Cycling	Eliška Kvasničková	MIX Brilon - Sportraces
Denmark	Rebecca Koerner	Uno-X Pro Cycling Team	Emma Norsgaard	Movistar Team
Dominican Republic	Gabriella Tejada		Mónica Rodríguez	
Ecuador	Ana Vivar	Movistar–Best PC	Miryam Núñez	Massi–Tactic
Egypt	Ebtissam Mohamed	Zaaf Cycling Team	Ebtissam Mohamed	Zaaf Cycling Team
El Salvador	Sauking Shi	Gravity-Analiza	Massiel Martínez	
Eritrea	Ksanet Gebremeskel			
Estonia	Laura Lizette Sander	AG Insurance-NXTG U23	Laura Lizette Sander	AG Insurance-NXTG U23
Eswatini	Nontsikelelo Mdlovu			
Ethiopia	Trhas Teklehaimanot Tesfay	Soltec Iberoamérica	Trhas Teklehaimanot Tesfay	Soltec Iberoamérica
Finland	Anniina Ahtosalo	Uno-X Pro Cycling Team	Anniina Ahtosalo	Uno-X Pro Cycling Team
France	Victoire Berteau	Cofidis	Cédrine Kerbaol	Ceratizit–WNT Pro Cycling
Germany	Liane Lippert	Movistar Team	Mieke Kröger	Human Powered Health
Greece	Argiro Milaki	Denver Disruptors	Argiro Milaki	Denver Disruptors
Guatemala	Jasmin Soto	Macizo-Cordelsa-Don Paletero	Jasmin Soto	Macizo-Cordelsa-Don Paletero
Guyana	Clivecia Spencer	Linden	Denise Jeffrey	
Honduras	Linda Menéndez	Cendema Cemplus Racing Team	Gissel Andino	Prototype-Probike Women Cycling
Hong Kong	Lee Sze Wing	SHKP Supernova Cycling Team	Wing Yee Leung	
Hungary	Blanka Vas	SD Worx	Blanka Vas	SD Worx
Iceland	Hafdís Sigurðardóttir		Hafdís Sigurðardóttir	
India	Swasti Singh	Orissa Cycling Team	Kavita Siyag	Rajasthan Cycling Team
Indonesia	Agustina Delia Priatna			
Iran	Pantea Gholipour		Somayeh Yazdani	
Ireland	Lara Gillespie	UAE Development Team	Kelly Murphy	AWOL O'Shea
Israel	Antonina Reznikov		Rotem Gafinovitz	Hess Cycling Team
Italy	Elisa Longo Borghini	Lidl–Trek	Elisa Longo Borghini	Lidl–Trek
Jamaica	Llori Sharpe	Canyon–SRAM Zondacrypto Generation	Llori Sharpe	Canyon–SRAM Zondacrypto Generation
Japan	Eri Yonamine	Human Powered Health	Yui Ishida	
Kazakhstan	Makhabbat Umutzhanova	Dubai Police Team	Makhabbat Umutzhanova	Dubai Police Team
Kosovo	Sibora Kadriu		Sibora Kadriu	
Latvia	Anastasia Carbonari	UAE Development Team	Dana Rožlapa	
Lithuania	Olivija Baleišytė	Aromitalia–Basso Bikes–Vaiano	Olivija Baleišytė	Aromitalia–Basso Bikes–Vaiano
Lesotho	Tsepiso Lerata			
Luxembourg	Christine Majerus	SD Worx	Christine Majerus	SD Worx
Malaysia	Nur Aisyah Mohamad Zubir		Siti Nur Adibah Akma Mohd Fuad	
Malta			Marie Claire Aquilina	Team Greens
Mauritius	Aurelie Halbwachs		Aurelie Halbwachs	
Mexico	Belén Garza	Nuevo León	Andrea Ramírez	Bizkaia–Durango
Moldova	Ecaterina Mogîldea		Liubovi Iachimova	
Mongolia	Anujin Jinjiibadam		Solongo Tserenlkham	
Morocco	Chaimae Ez-Zakraoui		Chaimae Ez-Zakraoui	
Namibia	Vera Looser		Melissa Hinz	
Netherlands	Demi Vollering	SD Worx	Riejanne Markus	Team Jumbo–Visma
New Zealand	Ally Wollaston	AG Insurance–Soudal–Quick-Step	Georgia Williams	EF Education–Tibco–SVB
Nicaragua	Maria Elisa Gómez	Team Kilos	Maria Elisa Gómez	Team Kilos
Nigeria	Ese Ukpeseraye			
North Macedonia	Elena Petrova		Elena Petrova	
Norway	Susanne Andersen	Uno-X Pro Cycling Team	Mie Bjørndal Ottestad	Uno-X Pro Cycling Team
Pakistan	Nida Bibi		Rabia Garib	
Panama	Wendy Ducreux	Prototype-Probike Women Cycling	Anibel Prieto	
Paraguay	Agua Marina Espínola	Canyon–SRAM Zondacrypto Generation	Agua Marina Espínola	Canyon–SRAM Zondacrypto Generation
Philippines	Jermyn Prado		Jermyn Prado	
Poland	Monika Brzezna	MAT Atom Deweloper Wrocław	Agnieszka Skalniak-Sójka	Canyon//SRAM zondacrypto
Portugal	Cristiana Valente		Ana Caramelo	
Puerto Rico	Donelys Cariño		Erialis Otero	Cantabria Deporte–Río Miera
Republic of China	Ya Yu Tzai		Ke Xing Zeng	
Romania	Georgeta Ungureanu		Manuela Mureșan	Soltec Iberoamérica
Russia	Tamara Dronova	Israel Premier Tech Roland	Tamara Dronova	Israel Premier Tech Roland
Rwanda	Diane Ingabire	Canyon–SRAM Zondacrypto Generation	Diane Ingabire	Canyon–SRAM Zondacrypto Generation
Serbia	Jelena Erić	Movistar Team	Jelena Erić	Movistar Team
Singapore	Elizabeth Le Min Liau		Shirong Ava Woo	
Slovakia	Nora Jenčušová	Bepink	Nora Jenčušová	Bepink
Slovenia	Urška Pintar	BTC City Ljubljana Scott	Urška Žigart	Team Jayco–AlUla
South Africa	Frances Janse van Rensburg	Stade Rochelais Charente-Maritime	Zanri Rossouw	Team Reach for Rainbows
South Korea	Lee Eun-hee		Lee Ju-mi	
Spain	Mavi García	Liv Racing TeqFind	Mireia Benito	AG Insurance–Soudal–Quick-Step
Sweden	Emilia Fahlin	FDJ–Suez	Jenny Rissveds	Team Coop–Hitec Products
Switzerland	Marlen Reusser	SD Worx	Elena Hartmann	Israel Premier Tech Roland
Thailand	Chaniporn Batriya	Thailand Women's Cycling Team	Chaniporn Batriya	Thailand Women's Cycling Team
Trinidad and Tobago	Alexi Ramirez	Miami Blazers	Alexi Ramirez	Miami Blazers
Tunisia	Nadine Moussa		Ghedira Nesrine	
Turkey	Azize Bekar	Sakarya BB Pro Team	Azize Bekar	Sakarya BB Pro Team
Ukraine	Maryna Altukhova		Valeriya Kononenko	
United Arab Emirates	Safia Al Sayegh	UAE Team ADQ	Shaikha Rashed	
United Kingdom	Pfeiffer Georgi	Team DSM	Lizzie Holden	UAE Team ADQ
United States	Chloé Dygert	Canyon//SRAM zondacrypto	Chloé Dygert	Canyon//SRAM zondacrypto
Uruguay	Johanna Bracco		Mariana García	Pavè D'Amico Women's Cycling Team
Uzbekistan	Yanina Kuskova	7 Saber Uzbekistan Cycling Team	Olga Zabelinskaya	7 Saber Uzbekistan Cycling Team
Venezuela	Lilibeth Chacón	Clarus Merquimia Group - Strongman	Lilibeth Chacón	Clarus Merquimia Group - Strongman
Zimbabwe	Skye Davidson		Skye Davidson	

==== Champions in UCI Women's teams ====
UCI Women's WorldTeams
Team	Road Race Champions	Time Trial Champions
Canyon//SRAM	Chloé Dygert (USA)	Agnieszka Skalniak-Sójka (POL); Chloé Dygert (USA)
EF Education–Tibco–SVB	Alison Jackson (CAN)	Georgia Williams (NZL)
Fenix–Deceuninck		
FDJ United–Suez	Emilia Fahlin (SWE)	
Human Powered Health	Antri Christoforou (CYP); Eri Yonamine (JPN)	Antri Christoforou (CYP); Mieke Kröger (GER)
Lidl–Trek	Brodie Chapman (AUS); Elisa Longo Borghini (ITA)	Elisa Longo Borghini (ITA)
Liv Racing TeqFind	Mavi García (ESP)	
Movistar Team	Arlenis Sierra (CUB); Liane Lippert (GER); Jelena Erić (SRB)	Arlenis Sierra (CUB); Emma Norsgaard (DEN); Jelena Erić (SRB)
Israel Premier Tech Roland	Tamara Dronova (RUS)	Anna Kiesenhofer (AUT); Tamara Dronova (RUS); Elena Hartmann (SUI)
SD Worx	Lotte Kopecky (BEL); Blanka Vas (HUN); Christine Majerus (LUX); Demi Vollering (NED); Marlen Reusser (SUI)	Lotte Kopecky (BEL); Blanka Vas (HUN); Christine Majerus (LUX)
Team Jayco–AlUla		Urška Žigart (SLO)
Team DSM	Pfeiffer Georgi (GBR)	
Team Jumbo–Visma		Riejanne Markus (NED)
UAE Team ADQ	Safia Al Sayegh (UAE)	Lizzie Holden (GBR)
Uno-X Pro Cycling Team	Rebecca Koerner (DEN); Anniina Ahtosalo (FIN); Susanne Andersen (NOR)	Anniina Ahtosalo (FIN); Mie Bjørndal Ottestad (NOR)

UCI Women's Continental Teams
Team	Road Race Champions	Time Trial Champions
AG Insurance–Soudal–Quick-Step	Ally Wollaston (NZL)	Mireia Benito (ESP)
ARA Skip Capital		
Arkéa Pro Cycling Team		Grace Brown (AUS)
Aromitalia–Basso Bikes–Vaiano	Olivija Baleišytė (LTU)	Olivija Baleišytė (LTU)
MAT Atom Deweloper Wrocław	Monika Brzezna (POL)	
O'Shea Redchilli Bikes		Kelly Murphy (IRL)
Bepink	Nora Jenčušová (SVK)	Nora Jenčušová (SVK)
Chevalmeire		
Bizkaia–Durango	Ana Vitória Magalhães (BRA)	Andrea Ramírez (MEX)
BTC City Ljubljana Zhiraf Ambedo		
BTC City Ljubljana Scott	Urška Pintar (SLO)	
DAS–Hutchinson		
Cantabria Deporte–Río Miera		Erialis Otero (PUR)
Canyon–SRAM Zondacrypto Generation	Llori Sharpe (JAM); Agua Marina Espínola (PAR); Diane Ingabire (RWA)	Llori Sharpe (JAM); Agua Marina Espínola (PAR); Diane Ingabire (RWA)
Ceratizit–WNT Pro Cycling		Cédrine Kerbaol (FRA)
China Liv Pro Cycling		
Cofidis	Victoire Berteau (FRA)	
Cynisca Cycling		
DNA Pro Cycling	Diana Peñuela (COL)	
Emotional.fr–Tornatech–GSC Blagnac		
Eneicat–CMTeam–Seguros Deportivos		Aranza Villalón (CHI)
Team Farto–BTC Women's Cycling Team		
Fenix-Deceuninck Continental	Carina Schrempf (AUT)	
A.S.D. K2 Women Team		
GT Krush Rebellease Pro Cycling		
InstaFund Racing		
Isolmant–Premac–Vittoria		
Israel Premier Tech Roland Development		
Laboral Kutxa–Fundación Euskadi		
Li-Ning Star		
Lifeplus Wahoo		
Lotto–Dstny Ladies		
Massi–Tactic		Miryam Núñez (ECU)
Maxx-Solar Rose Women Racing		
VolkerWessels Women Cyclingteam		
Primeau Vélo Racing Team		
Proximus-Alphamotorhomes-Doltcini		
Boneshaker Project presented by ROXO		
Servetto–Makhymo–Beltrami TSA		
Soltec Iberoamérica	Trhas Teklehaimanot Tesfay (ETH)	Manuela Mureșan (ROM); Trhas Teklehaimanot Tesfay (ETH)
Sopela Women's Team		
St. Michel–Preference Home–Auber93		
Stade Rochelais Charente-Maritime	Frances Janse van Rensburg (RSA)	
Tashkent City Women Professional Cycling Team	Yanina Kuskova (UZB)	Olga Zabelinskaya (UZB)
Team BridgeLane		
Team Coop–Hitec Products		Jenny Rissveds (SWE)
Team Groupe Abadie		
Team Abadie-Magnan		Fernanda Yapura (ARG)
Team Mendelspeck E-Work		
Thailand Women's Cycling Team	Chaniporn Batriya (THA)	Chaniporn Batriya (THA)
Top Girls Fassa Bortolo		
Torelli		
UAE Development Team	Anastasia Carbonari (LAT); Lara Gillespie (IRL)	
Virginia's Blue Ridge–Twenty28		
WCC Team		
Zaaf Cycling Team	Ebtissam Mohamed (EGY)	Ebtissam Mohamed (EGY)
