= Breno Sidoti =

Brazilian bicycle racer

Personal information
- Full name: Breno França Sidoti
- Born: 16 March 1983 (age 43) Cruzeiro, São Paulo, Brazil

Cycling career
- Sport: Cycling
- Current team: Retired
- Discipline: Road
- Role: Rider

Professional teams
- 2007–2009: Scott–Marcondes Cesar–São José dos Campos
- 2010–2013: Funvic–Pindamonhangaba
Medal record
Men's road bicycle racing
Representing Brazil
Pan American Championships
Silver medal – second place	2006 São Paulo	Road race

Breno França Sidoti (born 16 March 1983) is a Brazilian former professional road cyclist.

== Major results ==
2003
1st Stage 3 Tour de Santa Catarina
3rd Copa América de Ciclismo
2004
2nd Overall Volta Ciclística de Porto Alegre
3rd Overall Tour do Brasil

1st Stage 4

3rd Overall Tour do Rio
2005
National Under-23 Road Championships

1st Road race
1st Time trial

1st Stage 4 Volta do Paraná
1st Stage 3 Tour de Santa Catarina
3rd Overall Volta Ciclística de Porto Alegre
7th Overall Volta de Ciclismo Internacional do Estado de São Paulo
2006
2nd Road race, Pan American Road Championships
2nd Trofeo Zsšdi
2009
1st Overall Tour do Rio

1st Stage 1

1st Stage 5b (ITT) Rutas de America
6th Overall Volta Ciclística Internacional do Rio Grande do Sul
2010
9th Overall Tour do Rio
2011
1st Copa América de Ciclismo
