= Henrique Avancini =

Brazilian mountain bike racer

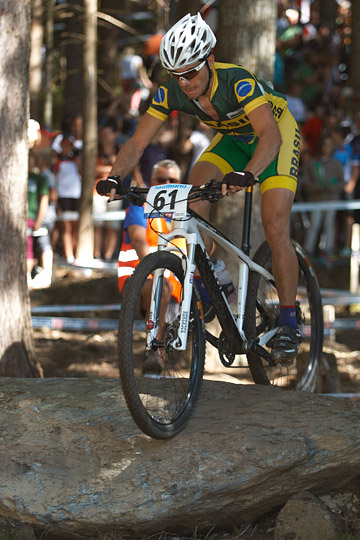
- Henrique Avancini in 2012

Personal information
- Born: 30 March 1989 (age 37) Petrópolis, Brazil
- Height: 1.76 m (5 ft 9 in)
- Weight: 67 kg (148 lb)

Cycling career
- Sport: Cycling
- Current team: Localiza Meoo / Swift Pro Cycling
- Disciplines: Mountain bike; Road
- Role: Rider

Professional teams
- 2009–2011: ISD Cycling Team
- 2013–2014: CALOI
- 2015–2022: Cannondale Factory Racing
- 2023: CALOI Henrique Avancini Racing
- 2025: Factor Racing
- 2026–: Localiza Meoo / Swift Pro Cycling

Major wins
- Mountain bike World Marathon Championships (2018, 2023) XC World Cup 1 individual win (2020)
Medal record
Representing Brazil
Men's Mountain bike racing
World Championships
Silver medal – second place	2021 Val di Sole	Short track
Pan American Games
Silver medal – second place	2019 Lima	Cross-country
Men's Mountain bike marathon
World Championships
Gold medal – first place	2018 Auronzo di Cadore	Men's race
Gold medal – first place	2023 Glasgow	Men's race

Henrique Avancini (born 30 March 1989) is a Brazilian mountain bike racer and road cyclist, who currently rides for UCI Continental team Localiza Meoo / Swift Pro Cycling. He is a two-time winner of the UCI Mountain Bike Marathon World Championships (2018 and 2023), 17 times winner at the National Cross-country cycling championship (2006, 2007, 2008, 2009, 2011, 2013, 2015, 2016, 2018, 2019, 2020, 2021, 2022), and four times Pan American champion. Partnered with German rider Manuel Fumic at the 2016 and 2017 Absa Cape Epic, he won the prologue time trial and stage 1 in 2017, and the stage 7 finale in 2016.

He represented Brazil at the 2012 Summer Olympics, 2016 Summer Olympics, and 2020 Summer Olympics. He is considered the most successful Brazilian mountain bike athlete.

== Major results ==
=== Road ===
2008
8th Prova Ciclística 9 de Julho
2025
8th GP Slovenian Istria
10th Overall Istrian Spring Tour
2026
National Championships

1st Time trial
3rd Road race

1st Overall Tour of the Gila
8th Overall Tour du Rwanda

=== MTB ===
2013
1st Cross-country, National Championships
3rd Cross-country, Pan American Championships
2014
1st Cross-country, South American Games
2nd Cross-country, National Championships
2015
1st Cross-country, Pan American Championships
1st Cross-country, National Championships
2nd Overall Cyprus Sunshine Cup
2016
1st Cross-country, National Championships
1st Stage 7 Cape Epic
2nd Cross-country, Pan American Championships
2017
Cape Epic

1st Prologue & Stage 1

2nd Cross-country, Pan American Championships
2nd Cross-country, National Championships
2018
1st Marathon, UCI World Championships
1st Cross-country, National Championships
UCI XCC World Cup

1st Vallnord

3rd Overall Cape Epic (with Manuel Fumic)

1st Stages 1 & 2

2019
1st Cross-country, National Championships
1st Marathon, National Championships
2nd Overall Cape Epic (with Manuel Fumic)

1st Stage 3

3rd Overall UCI XCO World Cup

3rd Nové Město
3rd Vallnord
3rd Les Gets

UCI XCC World Cup

1st Vallnord
2nd Les Gets

2020
National Championships

1st Cross-country
1st Short track

1st Overall UCI Ranking MTB XCO
UCI XCO World Cup

1st Nové Město II

UCI XCC World Cup

1st Nové Město II

1st Copa Catalana Internacional BTT
1st Strabag Czech MTB Cup
1st Górale na Start
2021
National Championships

1st Cross-country
1st Short track

UCI XCC World Cup

1st Lenzerheide
2nd Snowshoe

Internazionali d’Italia Series

1st Capoliveri

2nd Short track, UCI World Championships
2022
Pan American Championships

1st Cross-country
2nd Short track

National Championships

1st Cross-country
1st Short track

1st Taça Brasil
1st Internacional Estrada Real
1st Brasil Ride Bahia - Stage Class 1
2023
National Championships

1st Cross-country
1st Short track

1st Marathon, UCI World Championships

=== Gravel ===
2026
1st National Championships
UCI Gravel World Series

1st Gravel Brazil
