= Rodrigo Nascimento (disambiguation) =

Rodrigo Nascimento may refer to:

- Rodrigo Nascimento Ferreira (born 1992), Brazilian mixed martial artist
- Rodrigo Nascimento (cyclist) (born 1985), Brazilian cyclist
- Rodrigo Nascimento França (born 1996), Brazilian footballer, also known as Rodrigo Becão
- Rodrigo Nascimento de Oliveira Luz (born 1995), Brazilian footballer, also known as Rodrigo Fumaça
