= Volta de Porto Alegre =

Race details
- Date: March
- Region: Porto Alegre, Brazil
- English name: Tour of Porto Alegre
- Discipline: Road
- Competition: UCI America Tour
- Type: One day race

History
- First edition: 1996
- Editions: 11
- Final edition: 2006
- First winner: Valcemar Silva (BRA)
- Most wins: Valcemar Silva (BRA) (3 wins)
- Final winner: Armando Camargo (BRA)

The Volta Ciclística de Porto Alegre was a multi-day road cycling race held annually from 1996 to 2006 around Porto Alegre, Brazil. It added to the UCI calendar in 2004 as a 2.5 event, and as a 2.2 event on the UCI America Tour for its last two editions.

== Winners ==
Year	Winner	Second	Third
1996	(Brazil) Valcemar Silva	(Brazil) Paulo Jamur	(Brazil) Lauri Lunckes
1997	(Brazil) José Dos Santos	(Brazil) Valcemar Silva	(Brazil) Evanio Zimermann
1998	(Brazil) Erni Da Silva	(Brazil) Valcemar Silva	(Brazil) José Dos Santos
1999	(Brazil) Renato Roshler	(Brazil) José Dos Santos	(Brazil) Douglas Muller
2000	(Brazil) Valcemar Silva	(Brazil) Soelito Gohr	(Brazil) Marcelo Moser
2001	(Uruguay) José Maneiro	(Brazil) Rafael Antonio Silva	(Brazil) Rodrigo De Mello
2002	(Brazil) Valcemar Silva	(Brazil) Marcelo Moser	(Brazil) Altemir Da Rosa
2003	(Uruguay) Geovani Fernández	(Brazil) Marcelo Moser	(Brazil) Janio Rossa
2004	(Brazil) André Grizante	(Brazil) Breno Sidoti	(Brazil) Soelito Gohr
2005	(Argentina) Jorge Giacinti	(Brazil) Márcio May	(Brazil) Breno Sidoti
2006	(Brazil) Armando Camargo	(Uruguay) Miguel Direnna	(Brazil) Magno Nazaret
