= 2015 UCI Road World Championships – Men's road race =

Men's road race
2015 UCI Road World Championships
- Rainbow jersey

Race details
- Dates: September 27, 2015
- Stages: 1
- Distance: 261.40 km (162.43 mi)
- Winning time: 6h 14' 37"

Medalists
	Gold	Peter Sagan (SVK)
	Silver	Michael Matthews (AUS)
	Bronze	Ramūnas Navardauskas (LTU)

The Men's road race of the 2015 UCI Road World Championships was a cycling event that took place on September 27, 2015, in Richmond, Virginia, United States. It was the 82nd edition of the championship, and Poland's Michał Kwiatkowski was the defending champion.

Peter Sagan of Slovakia attacked on the final climb up 23rd Street and managed to stay clear of the field to take his first world title. Three seconds behind, Australian rider Michael Matthews and Lithuania's Ramūnas Navardauskas led home a 24-rider group to take the silver and bronze medals respectively.

== Course ==
Profile of the road race circuit

All road races took place on a challenging, technical and inner-city road circuit, 16.22 km (10.08 mi) in length. The elite men's race consisted of 15 laps – plus a start lap of 18.1 km (11.2 mi) – for a total of 261.4 km (162.4 mi).

The circuit headed west from Downtown Richmond, working its way onto Monument Avenue, a paver-lined, historic boulevard that's been named one of the "10 Great Streets in America". Cyclists took a 180-degree turn at the Jefferson Davis monument and then maneuvered through the Uptown district and Virginia Commonwealth University. Halfway through the circuit, the race headed down into Shockoe Bottom before following the canal and passing Great Shiplock Park, the start of the Virginia Capital Trail. A sharp, off-camber turn at Rockets Landing brought the riders to the narrow, twisty, cobbled 200 meters (660 feet) climb up to Libby Hill Park in the historic Church Hill neighborhood. A quick descent, followed by three hard turns led to a 100 meters (330 feet) climb up 23rd Street. Once atop this steep cobbled hill, riders descended into Shockoe Bottom. This led them to the final 300 meters (980 feet) climb on Governor Street. At the top, the riders had to take a sharp left turn onto the false-flat finishing straight, 680 meters (2,230 feet) to the finish.

== Qualification ==
Qualification was based on performances on the UCI run tours during 2015. Results from January to the middle of August counted towards the qualification criteria on both the 2015 UCI World Tour and the UCI Continental Circuits across the world, with the rankings being determined upon the release of the numerous tour rankings on August 15, 2015.

The following 51 nations qualified.

Number of riders	Nations
14 to enter, 9 to start	Australia, Belgium, Colombia, France, Germany, Great Britain, Italy, Netherlands, Spain
9 to enter, 6 to start	Algeria, Canada, Czech Republic, Denmark, Iran, Norway, Poland, Russia, Slovenia, Ukraine, United States, Venezuela
5 to enter, 3 to start	Argentina, Austria, Belarus, Brazil, Costa Rica, Croatia, Estonia, Ireland, Japan, Kazakhstan, Lithuania, Luxembourg, Morocco, New Zealand, Portugal, Slovakia, South Africa, South Korea, Switzerland, Turkey
2 to enter, 1 to start	Azerbaijan, Chile, Ecuador, Eritrea, Greece, Guatemala, Latvia, Romania, Serbia, Tunisia

The qualification process became subject to criticism after several nations, including Iran, Turkey and Morocco did not take up their allocation.

== Schedule ==
All times are in Eastern Daylight Time (UTC−4).

Date	Time	Event
September 27, 2015	9:00–15:40	Men's road race

== Final classification ==
Of the race's 192 entrants, 110 riders completed the full distance of 261.4 km (162.4 mi).

Rank	Rider	Country	Time
1	Peter Sagan	Slovakia	6h 14' 37"
2	Michael Matthews	Australia	+ 3"
3	Ramūnas Navardauskas	Lithuania	+ 3"
4	Alexander Kristoff	Norway	+ 3"
5	Alejandro Valverde	Spain	+ 3"
6	Simon Gerrans	Australia	+ 3"
7	Tony Gallopin	France	+ 3"
8	Michał Kwiatkowski	Poland	+ 3"
9	Rui Costa	Portugal	+ 3"
10	Philippe Gilbert	Belgium	+ 3"
11	Tom Dumoulin	Netherlands	+ 3"
12	Alex Howes	United States	+ 3"
13	Niki Terpstra	Netherlands	+ 3"
14	Rein Taaramäe	Estonia	+ 3"
15	Vyacheslav Kuznetsov	Russia	+ 3"
16	Nelson Oliveira	Portugal	+ 3"
17	Yukiya Arashiro	Japan	+ 3"
18	Giacomo Nizzolo	Italy	+ 3"
19	Brent Bookwalter	United States	+ 3"
20	Edvald Boasson Hagen	Norway	+ 3"
21	Nacer Bouhanni	France	+ 3"
22	Ben Swift	Great Britain	+ 3"
23	Greg Van Avermaet	Belgium	+ 3"
24	Tanel Kangert	Estonia	+ 3"
25	Andrey Amador	Costa Rica	+ 3"
26	Marco Haller	Austria	+ 12"
27	Daniel Moreno	Spain	+ 12"
28	Silvan Dillier	Switzerland	+ 12"
29	John Degenkolb	Germany	+ 15"
30	Luis León Sánchez	Spain	+ 15"
31	Steve Cummings	Great Britain	+ 15"
32	Rigoberto Urán	Colombia	+ 18"
33	Matti Breschel	Denmark	+ 21"
34	Matteo Trentin	Italy	+ 21"
35	Tom Boonen	Belgium	+ 21"
36	Pavel Brutt	Russia	+ 21"
37	Alexey Tsatevich	Russia	+ 28"
38	Arnaud Démare	France	+ 32"
39	Tomasz Marczyński	Poland	+ 40"
40	Sam Bennett	Ireland	+ 40"
41	Karel Hník	Czech Republic	+ 40"
42	Vincenzo Nibali	Italy	+ 40"
43	Zdeněk Štybar	Czech Republic	+ 40"
44	Heinrich Haussler	Australia	+ 40"
45	Lars Bak	Denmark	+ 55"
46	Andriy Hryvko	Ukraine	+ 55"
47	Luka Pibernik	Slovenia	+ 55"
48	Luka Mezgec	Slovenia	+ 55"
49	Mykhaylo Kononenko	Ukraine	+ 55"
50	Daryl Impey	South Africa	+ 55"
51	Ian Stannard	Great Britain	+ 55"
52	Juan José Lobato	Spain	+ 55"
53	Ben King	United States	+ 55"
54	Michał Gołaś	Poland	+ 55"
55	Sergey Lagutin	Russia	+ 55"
56	Jon Izagirre	Spain	+ 55"
57	Adam Yates	Great Britain	+ 55"
58	Greg Henderson	New Zealand	+ 55"
59	Maciej Paterski	Poland	+ 1' 10"
60	Kanstantsin Sivtsov	Belarus	+ 1' 38"
61	Antoine Duchesne	Canada	+ 1' 50"
62	Ilnur Zakarin	Russia	+ 1' 55"
63	Alexey Lutsenko	Kazakhstan	+ 2' 02"
64	Sep Vanmarcke	Belgium	+ 2' 08"
65	Maximiliano Richeze	Argentina	+ 2' 09"
66	Michael Albasini	Switzerland	+ 2' 15"
67	Michael Valgren	Denmark	+ 2' 50"
68	Carlos Quintero	Colombia	+ 2' 50"
69	Bauke Mollema	Netherlands	+ 2' 50"
70	Arman Kamyshev	Kazakhstan	+ 2' 50"
71	Jens Keukeleire	Belgium	+ 2' 50"
72	Vegard Stake Laengen	Norway	+ 2' 50"
73	Adam Hansen	Australia	+ 2' 50"
74	Rafał Majka	Poland	+ 2' 50"
75	Mickaël Delage	France	+ 2' 50"
76	Grégory Rast	Switzerland	+ 2' 50"
77	Mathew Hayman	Australia	+ 2' 50"
78	Michael Mørkøv	Denmark	+ 2' 50"
79	Tyler Farrar	United States	+ 3' 00"
80	Tiesj Benoot	Belgium	+ 3' 35"
81	Lars Boom	Netherlands	+ 3' 35"
82	Manuel Quinziato	Italy	+ 3' 41"
83	Daniele Bennati	Italy	+ 3' 41"
84	Fabio Felline	Italy	+ 3' 41"
85	Taylor Phinney	United States	+ 3' 41"
86	Grega Bole	Slovenia	+ 3' 45"
87	Sebastian Langeveld	Netherlands	+ 3' 45"
88	Tony Martin	Germany	+ 4' 00"
89	Elia Viviani	Italy	+ 5' 18"
90	Simon Geschke	Germany	+ 5' 23"
91	Robert Gesink	Netherlands	+ 6' 43"
92	Stijn Vandenbergh	Belgium	+ 6' 43"
93	Ryan Anderson	Canada	+ 6' 43"
94	Michael Woods	Canada	+ 6' 43"
95	Sergey Chernetskiy	Russia	+ 6' 43"
96	Dylan van Baarle	Netherlands	+ 6' 43"

Rank	Rider	Country	Time
97	Jan Bárta	Czech Republic	+ 6' 43"
98	Jiří Polnický	Czech Republic	+ 6' 43"
99	Pim Ligthart	Netherlands	+ 6' 43"
100	Cyril Lemoine	France	+ 6' 43"
101	Scott Thwaites	Great Britain	+ 6' 43"
102	Diego Ulissi	Italy	+ 6' 43"
103	Paul Voss	Germany	+ 8' 12"
104	Paul Martens	Germany	+ 10' 47"
105	André Greipel	Germany	+ 10' 47"
106	Marcel Sieberg	Germany	+ 10' 47"
107	Guillaume Boivin	Canada	+ 11' 11"
108	Radoslav Rogina	Croatia	+ 11' 11"
109	Lawson Craddock	United States	+ 12' 56"
110	Gatis Smukulis	Latvia	+ 13' 58"
	Joaquim Rodríguez	Spain	DNF
	Florian Vachon	France	DNF
	Simon Clarke	Australia	DNF
	Mitchell Docker	Australia	DNF
	Kristijan Đurasek	Croatia	DNF
	Georg Preidler	Austria	DNF
	Christian Knees	Germany	DNF
	Reinardt Janse van Rensburg	South Africa	DNF
	Jay McCarthy	Australia	DNF
	Luke Durbridge	Australia	DNF
	Roman Kreuziger	Czech Republic	DNF
	Luke Rowe	Great Britain	DNF
	Christopher Juul-Jensen	Denmark	DNF
	Rasmus Guldhammer	Denmark	DNF
	Nikolas Maes	Belgium	DNF
	Imanol Erviti	Spain	DNF
	Rubén Plaza	Spain	DNF
	Denys Kostyuk	Ukraine	DNF
	Lars Petter Nordhaug	Norway	DNF
	Kohei Uchima	Japan	DNF
	Ruslan Tleubayev	Kazakhstan	DNF
	Sébastien Minard	France	DNF
	Juraj Sagan	Slovakia	DNF
	Michael Kolář	Slovakia	DNF
	Kristijan Koren	Slovenia	DNF
	Lluís Mas	Spain	DNF
	Borut Božič	Slovenia	DNF
	Vasil Kiryienka	Belarus	DNF
	Juan Carlos Rojas Villegas	Costa Rica	DNF
	Ryan Roth	Canada	DNF
	Jarlinson Pantano	Colombia	DNF
	Johannes Fröhlinger	Germany	DNF
	Gediminas Bagdonas	Lithuania	DNF
	Petr Vakoč	Czech Republic	DNF
	Sven Erik Bystrøm	Norway	DNF
	Iljo Keisse	Belgium	DNF
	José Gonçalves	Portugal	DNF
	Winner Anacona	Colombia	DNF
	Alex Cano	Colombia	DNF
	Mekseb Debesay	Eritrea	DNF
	Manuel Rodas	Guatemala	DNF
	Julien Simon	France	DNF
	Vitaliy Buts	Ukraine	DNF
	Andrew Fenn	Great Britain	DNF
	Lukas Pöstlberger	Austria	DNF
	Julian Alaphilippe	France	DNF
	Maciej Bodnar	Poland	DNF
	Oleksandr Polivoda	Ukraine	DNF
	Polychronis Tzortzakis	Greece	DNF
	Edwin Ávila	Colombia	DNF
	Conor Dunne	Ireland	DNF
	Evaldas Šiškevičius	Lithuania	DNF
	Byron Guamá	Ecuador	DNF
	Kléber Ramos	Brazil	DNF
	Fumiyuki Beppu	Japan	DNF
	Miguel Ángel López	Colombia	DNF
	Hugo Houle	Canada	DNF
	Alex Dowsett	Great Britain	DNF
	Jesse Sergent	New Zealand	DNF
	Carlos Alzate	Colombia	DNF
	Tomáš Bucháček	Czech Republic	DNF
	Serghei Țvetcov	Romania	DNF
	Sam Bewley	New Zealand	DNF
	Laurent Didier	Luxembourg	DNF
	Daniel Jaramillo	Colombia	DNF
	Marko Kump	Slovenia	DNF
	Vegard Breen	Norway	DNF
	Yauheni Hutarovich	Belarus	DNF
	Jos van Emden	Netherlands	DNF
	Jempy Drucker	Luxembourg	DNF
	Ivan Stević	Serbia	DNF
	Daniel Oss	Italy	DNF
	Andriy Khripta	Ukraine	DNF
	Nikolay Mihaylov	Bulgaria	DNF
	Park Sung-baek	South Korea	DNF
	Gonzalo Garrido	Chile	DNF
	Alex Kirsch	Luxembourg	DNF
	Daniel Díaz	Argentina	DNF
	Seo Joon-yong	South Korea	DNF
	Antonio Garnero	Brazil	DNF
	César Rojas Villegas	Costa Rica	DNF
	Jaco Venter	South Africa	DNS
