= Cycling at the 2023 Pan American Games – Women's road race =

Women's road race at the 2023 Pan American Games
- Venue: Streets of Isla de Maipo
- Dates: October 29
- Competitors: 37 from 15 nations
- Winning time: 2:51.05

Medalists
Gold medal	Lauren Stephens	United States
Silver medal	Miryam Núñez	Ecuador
Bronze medal	Agua Marina Espínola	Paraguay

The women's road race competition of the cycling events at the 2023 Pan American Games was held on October 29 on the streets of Isla de Maipo, Chile.

== Schedule ==
Date	Time	Round
October 29, 2023	09:00	Final

== Results ==
Rank	Rider	Nation	Time
1st place, gold medalist(s)	Lauren Stephens	United States	2:51.05
2nd place, silver medalist(s)	Miryam Núñez	Ecuador	2:52.29
3rd place, bronze medalist(s)	Agua Marina Espínola	Paraguay	2:52.29
4	Ana Vitória Magalhães	Brazil	2:53:14
5	Arlenis Sierra	Cuba	2:53.35
6	Kristen Faulkner	United States	2:53.35
7	Catalina Soto	Chile	2:53.35
8	Paula Patiño	Colombia	2:53.36
9	Andrea Ramírez	Mexico	2:53.36
10	Marcela Prieto	Mexico	2:53.37
11	Jasmín Soto	Independent Athletes Team	2:53.37
12	Lilibeth Chacón	Venezuela	2:53.37
13	Adèle Normand	Canada	2:53.38
14	Diana Peñuela	Colombia	2:54.26
15	Karla Vallejos	Chile	2:54.26
16	Aranza Villalón	Chile	2:54.27
17	Andrea Alzate	Colombia	2:54.56
18	Ana Paula Polegatch	Brazil	2:54.56
19	Lina Hernández	Colombia	2:54.58
20	Yareli Acevedo	Mexico	2:58.59
21	Ruby West	Canada	3:00.22
22	Lizbeth Salazar	Mexico	3:00.23
23	Wilmarys Moreno	Venezuela	3:00.24
24	Maribel Aguirre	Argentina	3:00.24
25	Agustina Reyes	Uruguay	3:00.24
26	Milagro Mena	Costa Rica	3:00.26
27	Andisabel Luque	Venezuela	3:05.40
28	Ana Paula Casetta	Brazil	3:05.40
29	Claudia Baró	Cuba	3:05.40
30	Talita da Luz	Brazil	3:07.10
31	Paola Muñoz	Chile	3:07.20
32	Yendry Quesada	Costa Rica	3:13.41
33	Flor Espiritusanto	Dominican Republic	3:17.34
	Devaney Collier	Canada	DNF
	Irma Greve	Argentina	DNF
	Angie González	Venezuela	DNS
	Ngaire Barraclough	Canada	DNS
