= Kléber Ramos =

Brazilian cyclist (born 1985)

Personal information
- Full name: Kléber Ramos da Silva
- Born: August 24, 1985 (age 41) Soledade, Paraíba, Brazil
- Height: 1.67 m (5 ft 6 in)
- Weight: 65 kg (143 lb)

Cycling career
- Sport: Cycling
- Current team: Unifunvic Pindamondangadaba
- Discipline: Road
- Role: Rider
- Rider type: Sprinter

Amateur teams
- 2007–2008: Suzano–Flying Horse–Caloi
- 2009: Fapi–Funvic–Pindamonhangaba
- 2011: Padaria Real–Caloi
- 2021: Memorial Santos Fupes
- 2022–: Unifunvic Pindamondangadaba

Professional teams
- 2010: Funvic–Pindamonhangaba
- 2012: Real Cycling Team
- 2013: Clube DataRo
- 2014–2016: Funvic Brasilinvest–São José dos Campos

Kléber Ramos da Silva (born 24 August 1985) is a Brazilian cyclist, who currently rides for Brazilian amateur team Unifunvic Pindamondangadaba.

== Career ==
Ramos rode the road race at the 2016 Olympic Games in Rio de Janeiro, but a few days after the race it was revealed that he had tested positive for doping in a pre-games test.

=== Doping case ===
On 12 August 2016, the UCI announced that Ramos was provisionally suspended after a doping sample of his from 31 July 2016 had been found positive for CERA. He was later given a four-year ban, his suspension lasting until August 2020.

== Major results ==
2005
1st Stage 4 Volta a Porto Alegre
2007
National Road Championships

1st Under-23 road race
3rd Road race

1st Stage 6 Tour do Brasil
4th Overall Volta do Paraná

1st Stage 4

10th Copa América de Ciclismo
2008
1st Stage 6 Giro do Interior de São Paulo
5th Copa América de Ciclismo
2009
1st Stage 10 Vuelta del Uruguay
1st Stage 2 Tour de Santa Catarina
5th Prova Ciclística 9 de Julho
2010
4th Prova Ciclística 9 de Julho
2012
1st Overall Tour do Rio

1st Stage 3

1st Stage 3 Giro do Interior de São Paulo
1st Stage 5 Rutas de América
2013
3rd Copa América de Ciclismo
5th Overall Tour do Rio
2014
3rd Overall Tour do Rio

1st Mountains classification

2015
1st Stage 6 Tour de San Luis
2nd Overall Tour do Rio

1st Stage 4

7th International Road Cycling Challenge
2016
2nd Road race, National Road Championships
2nd Overall Volta Ciclística Internacional do Rio Grande do Sul
2021
1st Road race, National Road Championships
