= André Almeida =

André Almeida may refer to:

- André Almeida (footballer, born 1990), Portuguese football defender
- André Almeida (cyclist) (born 1992), Brazilian cyclist
- André Almeida (footballer, born 1995), Portuguese football defender
- André Almeida (footballer, born 2000), Portuguese football midfielder
