= Pedro Autran Nicacio =

Brazilian racing cyclist

Pedro Nicacio
Personal information
- Full name: Pedro Autran Dourado Dutra Nicacio
- Born: October 13, 1981 (age 45) Dourado, Brazil
- Height: 1.88 m (6 ft 2 in)
- Weight: 73 kg (161 lb)

Cycling career
- Sport: Cycling
- Current team: Retired
- Discipline: Road
- Role: Rider

Amateur teams
- 2004–2005: DataRo–Blumenau
- 2006: Scott–Marcondes Cesar–São José dos Campos

Professional teams
- 2007–2008: Scott–Marcondes Cesar–São José dos Campos
- 2010: Funvic–Pindamonhangaba
- 2012–2014: Funvic–Pindamonhangaba
- 2016–2017: Funvic Soul Cycles–Carrefour

Major wins
- Pan American Time Trial Championships (2006) National Time Trial Championships (2005–2007, 2014)
Medal record
Men's road bicycle racing
Representing Brazil
Pan American Championships
Gold medal – first place	2006 São Paulo	Time trial
Silver medal – second place	2005 Mar del Plata	Time trial

Pedro Autran Dourado Dutra Nicacio (born October 13, 1981) is a Brazilian former professional racing cyclist, who was the winner of the time trial at the 2006 Pan American Cycling Championships.

== Major results ==
2004
3rd Overall Tour de Santa Catarina
2005
1st Time trial, National Road Championships
2nd Time trial, Pan American Road Championships
2nd Overall Tour de Santa Catarina
3rd Overall Volta de São Paulo
2006
1st Time trial, Pan American Road Championships
1st Time trial, National Road Championships
1st Overall Tour de Santa Catarina

1st Stage 5 (ITT)

1st Stage 2b (ITT) Volta de Porto Alegre
2nd Overall Volta de São Paulo
2007
1st Time trial, National Road Championships
1st Stage 4 (ITT) Tour de Santa Catarina
2nd Overall Volta do Rio de Janeiro
4th Overall Volta de São Paulo
5th Time trial, Pan American Road Championships
2008
2nd Time trial, National Road Championships
2010
1st Stage 8 (ITT) Vuelta del Uruguay
2nd Time trial, National Road Championships
2014
1st Time trial, National Road Championships
2015
4th Time trial, Pan American Road Championships
