= Carlos Manarelli =

Brazilian cyclist (born 1989)

Personal information
- Full name: Carlos Alexandre Manarelli
- Born: 13 February 1989 (age 37) Paraná, Brazil

Cycling career
- Sport: Cycling
- Current team: FMD Rio do Sul–Royal Ciclo–Dalthon
- Discipline: Road
- Role: Rider

Amateur teams
- 2008–2010: Marchiol–Liquigas–Site
- 2011: Generali Ballan
- 2012: Zalf–Euromobil–Désirée–Fior
- 2020–2021: Smel Foz do Iguacu
- 2022–: FMD Rio do Sul–Royal Ciclo–Dalthon

Professional team
- 2013–2016: Funvic Brasilinvest–São José dos Campos

Carlos Alexandre Manarelli (born 13 February 1989) is a Brazilian road cyclist.

== Major results ==
2009
1st Gran Premio Industrie del Marmo
2010
2nd Overall Giro della Regione Friuli Venezia Giulia

1st Stage 2

5th Ruota d'Oro
6th Trofeo Città di San Vendemiano
2011
National Under-23 Road Championships

1st Road race
1st Time trial

2nd Time trial, National Road Championships
7th Giro del Belvedere
10th Trofeo Banca Popolare di Vicenza
2012
2nd Trofeo Papà Cervi
5th Time trial, Pan American Road Championships
2014
1st Overall Volta do Paraná

1st Points classification
1st Stages 2 & 3

8th Road race, Pan American Road Championships
2015
1st Copa América de Ciclismo
3rd Overall Volta do Paraná
2023
3rd Time trial, National Road Championships
