= UniFunvic–Pindamonhangaba =

Brazilian cycling team

Team information
- UCI code: SOU
- Registered: Brazil
- Founded: 2010
- Discipline: Road
- Status: UCI Continental (2010–2015); UCI Professional Continental (2016–2017); National (2018–)
- Bicycles: Soul
- Components: Shimano
- Website: Team home page

Key personnel
- General manager: Benedito Tadeu Azevedo Júnior
- Team manager: Ana Paula Luiza Castro

Team name history
- 2010–2012 2013–2014 2015 2016 2017 2018 2019–2020 2021 2022–: Funvic–Pindamonhangaba; Funvic Brasilinvest–São José dos Campos; Carrefour Funvic Soul Cycling Team; Funvic Soul Cycles–Carrefour; Soul Brasil Pro Cycling; Funvic–São José dos Campos; Funvic–Pindamonhangaba; UniFunvic–Gelog; UniFunvic–Pindamonhangaba
UniFunvic–Pindamonhangaba jersey
Jersey

UniFunvic–Pindamonhangaba (UCI team code: SOU) is a men's cycling team based in Brazil. The team was founded in 2010, and competed as a UCI Continental team from 2010 to 2015. a UCI Professional Continental team from 2016 to 2017 and since 2018 as an amateur club.

== Doping ==
On August 12, 2016, the UCI announced that Kléber Ramos had tested positive for CERA on 31 July 2016. Ramos had competed in the Olympic Games road race. On November 17 the UCI announced Ramiro Rincon Diaz and João Gaspar has also tested positive for CERA. These positive tests constituted the team's second and third AAFs within a twelve-month period and as a result, the UCI moved to suspend the team under Anti Doping Rule, article 7.12, Suspension of a Team Registered with the UCI. In December 2016, the team was suspended for 55 days, due to the three doping positives within a 12-month period.

In March 2017 Brazilian rider Alex Correia Diniz was provisionally suspended due to an adverse biological passport finding, with fellow Brazilian Otavio Bulgarelli being provisionally suspended for "tampering". With the team's previous ban expiring on February 12, the team now faces a potential ban of between 15 days to 12 months. In May, the team were banned for a second time for 35 days from 15 July to 19 August.

== Team roster ==
As of 1 January 2017.

Rider	Date of birth
Murilo Affonso (BRA)	19 June 1991 (age 35)
André Almeida (BRA)	16 December 1992 (age 33)
Flávio Cardoso (BRA)	12 October 1980 (age 46)
Lauro César Chaman (BRA)	25 June 1987 (age 39)
Francisco Chamorro (ARG)	7 August 1981 (age 45)
André Gohr (BRA)	15 August 1996 (age 30)
Caio Godoy (BRA)	24 April 1995 (age 31)
Gabriel Machado (BRA)	6 May 1997 (age 29)
Carlos Manarelli (BRA)	13 February 1989 (age 37)
Gideoni Monteiro (BRA)	2 September 1989 (age 37)

Rider	Date of birth
Breno Morais (BRA)	16 March 1997 (age 29)
Magno Nazaret (BRA)	17 January 1986 (age 40)
Pedro Autran Nicacio (BRA)	13 October 1981 (age 45)
Victor Ranghetti (BRA)	28 December 1998 (age 27)
Breno Morais (BRA)	16 March 1997 (age 29)
Roberto Pinheiro (BRA)	9 January 1983 (age 43)
Raphael Pires (BRA)	16 January 1997 (age 29)
Daniel Eduardo Silva (POR)	8 June 1985 (age 41)
Lincoln Vale (BRA)	11 April 1997 (age 29)
Jordi Simón (ESP)	6 September 1990 (age 36)

== Major wins ==
2010
Stages 5 & 9 Vuelta del Uruguay, Roberto Pinheiro
Stages 6 & 7a Vuelta del Uruguay, Héctor Aguilar
Stage 7b Vuelta del Uruguay, Pedro Autran Nicacio
Stages 4 & 5 Volta de Gravataí, Roberto Pinheiro
Stage 1 Tour de Santa Catarina, José Eriberto Silva
Stage 3 Tour de Santa Catarina, Edgardo Simón
Overall Volta do Paraná, Marco Arriagada

Stages 1 & 3, Marco Arriagada

Stages 1 & 7 Volta de São Paulo, Edgardo Simón
Stage 2 Volta de São Paulo, Héctor Aguilar
Stage 3 Volta de São Paulo, Flávio Cardoso
Stage 4a Volta de São Paulo, Magno Nazaret
2011
Brazil Time Trial Championships, Magno Nazaret
Stage 7 Tour de San Luis, Héctor Aguilar
Stage 6 Rutas de América, Héctor Aguilar
Prologue & Stage 1 Giro do Interior de São Paulo, Flávio Cardoso
Stage 2 Volta de Gravataí, Antônio Nascimento
Stage 4 Volta de Gravataí, Roberto Pinheiro
Stage 4 Tour do Rio, Magno Nazaret
Stage 1 Volta de São Paulo, Antônio Nascimento
Stage 3 Volta de São Paulo, Flávio Cardoso
Stage 4 Volta de São Paulo, Roberto Pinheiro
2012
Brazil Road Race Championships, Otávio Bulgarelli
Pan American Time Trial Championships, Magno Nazaret
Stage 1 Vuelta Mexico Telmex, Héctor Aguilar
Overall Vuelta del Uruguay, Magno Nazaret

Stage 3, Héctor Aguilar
Stage 8 (ITT), Magno Nazaret

Stage 2 Vuelta a Guatemala, Gregolry Panizo
Stage 5 Tour do Rio, Roberto Pinheiro
Overall Tour do Brasil, Magno Nazaret

Stage 3 (ITT), Magno Nazaret

2013
Copa América de Ciclismo, Francisco Chamorro
Stage 3 Tour de San Luis, Alex Diniz
Stage 5 Tour do Rio, Gregolry Panizo
2014
Brazil Road Race Championships, Antonio Garnero
Brazil Time Trial Championships, Pedro Autran Nicacio
Overall Tour do Brasil, Magno Nazaret

Stage 1, Flávio Cardoso
Stage 2, Juan Sebastián Tamayo
Stages 3 & 4 (ITT), Magno Nazaret

Stage 2 Volta do Rio Grande do Sul, Óscar Sánchez
Overall Volta do Paraná, Carlos Manarelli

Stages 2 & 3, Carlos Manarelli

2015
Overall Tour de San Luis, Daniel Díaz

Stages 2 & 4, Daniel Díaz
Stage 6, Kléber Ramos

Stages 2, 3, 6 & 8 Vuelta del Uruguay, Francisco Chamorro
Stage 1 Volta Ciclística Internacional do Rio Grande do Sul, Roberto Pinheiro
Stage 3 Volta do Paraná, Flávio Cardoso
Brazil Time Trial Championships, Magno Nazaret
Copa América de Ciclismo, Carlos Manarelli
2016
Overall Volta Ciclística Internacional do Rio Grande do Sul, Murilo Affonso

Stage 1, Murilo Affonso

Brazil Road Race Championships, Flávio Cardoso
2017
Overall Vuelta del Uruguay, Magno Nazaret

Stage 3b, Team time trial
Stage 6 (ITT), Magno Nazaret

Brazil Time Trial Championships, Magno Nazaret
2018
Overall Vuelta del Uruguay, Magno Nazaret

Stage 2a, Team time trial
Stage 8a (ITT), Magno Nazaret

== National champions ==
2011
Brazilian Time Trial Championship, Magno Nazaret
2012
Brazilian Road Race Championship, Otávio Bulgarelli
2014
Brazilian Road Race Championship, Antonio Garnero
Brazilian Time Trial Championship, Pedro Autran Nicacio
2015
Brazilian Time Trial Championship, Magno Nazaret
2016
Brazilian Road Race Championship, Flávio Cardoso
2017
Brazilian Time Trial Championship, Magno Nazaret
