= Rodrigo Nascimento (cyclist) =

Brazilian cyclist

Personal information
- Full name: Rodrigo Do Nascimento Inhe
- Born: 23 June 1985 (age 41) Passo Fundo, Brazil

Cycling career
- Sport: Cycling
- Current team: Localiza Meoo / Swift Pro Cycling
- Discipline: Road
- Role: Rider
- Rider type: Time trialist

Amateur teams
- 2013–2018: São Francisco Saúde–Powerade–Botafogo
- 2021–2024: Avaí–FME Florianopolis–APGF

Professional teams
- 2019: São Francisco Saúde–Klabin–SME Ribeirão Preto
- 2025–: Swift Pro Cycling

Rodrigo Do Nascimento Inhe (born 23 June 1985) is a Brazilian road cyclist, who rides for UCI Continental team Localiza Meoo / Swift Pro Cycling. He is a two-time winner of both the Brazilian National Time Trial Championships and the Brazilian National Road Race Championships.

== Career ==
At the end of 2017 Nascimento was declared the top racer in the Brazilian national rankings. In 2018 he won the Brazilian National Road Race Championships for a second time, this time attacking with 5 kilometres (3.1 miles) to go, reaching the line 4 seconds ahead of the next rider. Nascimento, despite having won four national championship titles, has only represented the Brazilian national team once – at the 2019 Pan American Games. He rode in both the road race where he finished 27th and the time trial where he finished 13th.

== Major results ==
2008
3rd Time trial, National Road Championships
2009
1st Time trial, National Road Championships
2013
National Road Championships

1st Road race
3rd Time trial

2014
National Road Championships

2nd Time trial
4th Road race

2015
2nd Overall Volta do Paraná
3rd Time trial, National Road Championships
2016
1st Time trial, National Road Championships
2017
4th Time trial, National Road Championships
2018
National Road Championships

1st Road race
4th Time trial

2019
National Road Championships

3rd Time trial
4th Road race

2024
5th Time trial, National Road Championships
2026
1st Stage 2 Volta Ciclistica Internacional do Estado de São Paulo
