= Luiz Cocuzzi =

Brazilian cyclist

Personal information
- Full name: Luiz Henrique Cocuzzi
- Born: 2 August 1993 (age 33) São Paulo, Brazil

Cycling career
- Sport: Cycling
- Current team: Localiza Meoo / Swift Pro Cycling
- Discipline: Mountain bike
- Role: Rider
- Rider type: Cross-country

Professional team
- 2022–: Swift Carbon Pro Cycling Brasil

Luiz Henrique Cocuzzi (born 2 August 1993) is a Brazilian cross-country mountain biker, who currently rides for UCI Continental team Localiza Meoo / Swift Pro Cycling. He competed at the 2020 Summer Olympics.
