= Brazilian National Road Race Championships =

Annual cycling competition in Brazil

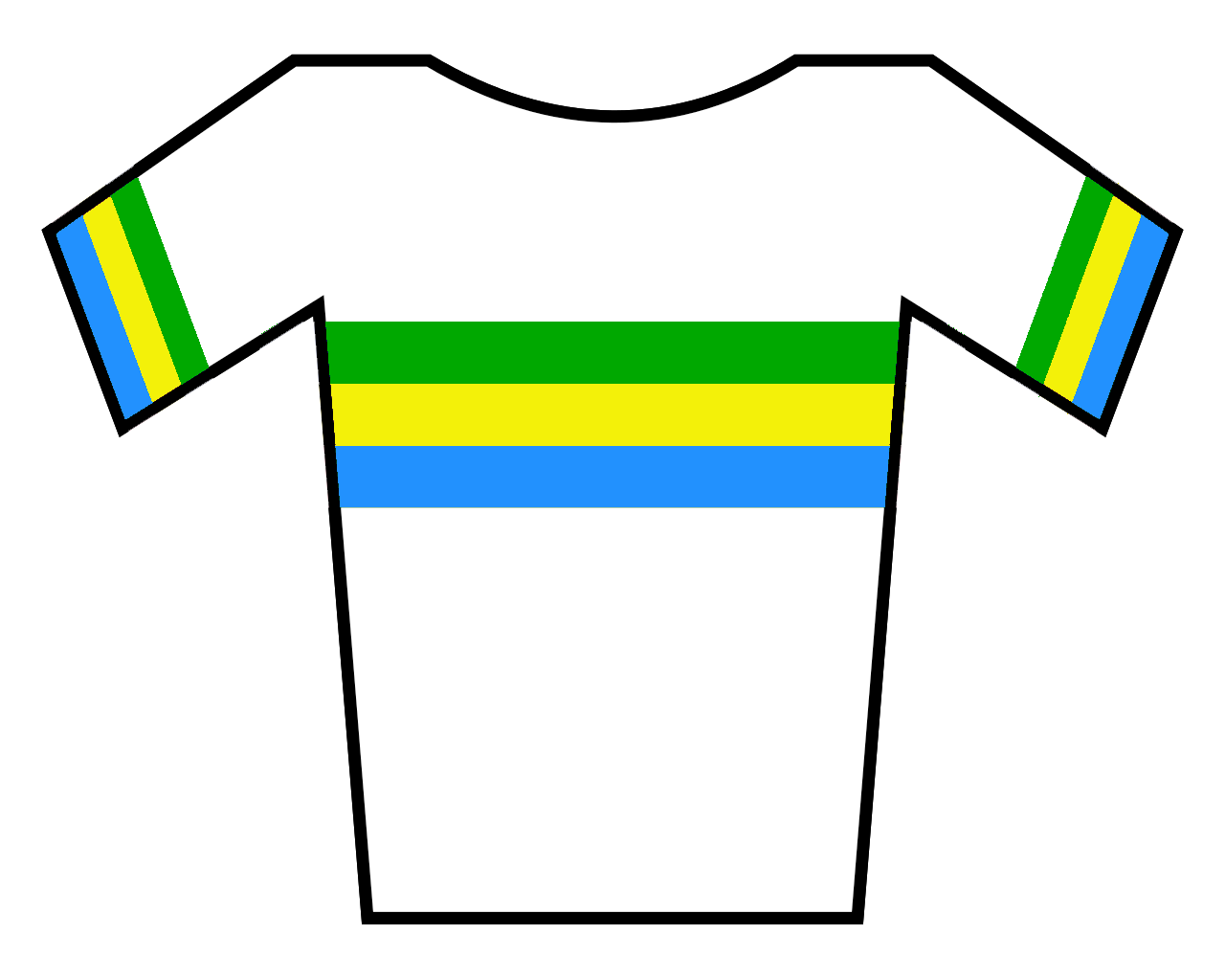

The Brazilian National Road Race Championships have been held since 2000.

== Men ==
Year	Gold	Silver	Bronze
2000	Glauber de Souza	Daniel Valter Rogelim	José dos Santos
2001	Daniel Valter Rogelim	José Aparecido dos Santos	Pedro Romero Dos Santos
2002	No race		
2003	Hernandes Quadri	Soelito Gohr	Márcio May
2004	Renato Ruiz	José Aparecido dos Santos	Mauricio Valente
2005	Roberson Silva	Nilceu Aparecido Santos	Fabielle Mota
2006	Soelito Gohr	Renato Seabra	Tiago Fiorilli
2007	Nilceu Aparecido Santos	Roberto Pinheiro	Kléber Ramos
2008	Valcemar Silva	Jean Marcel Da Silva	André Luiz Pulini
2009	Flávio Cardoso	Mauricio Morandi	Murilo Fischer
2010	Murilo Fischer	Armando Camargo	Magno Nazaret
2011	Murilo Fischer	Cleberson Weber	Gregolry Panizo
2012	Otávio Bulgarelli	Rafael Andriato	Fabiele Mota
2013	Rodrigo Nascimento	Alex Diniz	Alan Valencio
2014	Antonio Garnero	Roberto Pinheiro	Thiago Nardin
2015	Everson Camilo	Jeovane Oliveira	José Eriberto Rodrigues
2016	Flávio Cardoso	Kléber Ramos	Roberto Pinheiro
2017	Roberto Pinheiro	Rodrigo Nascimento	Ciao Ormenese
2018	Rodrigo Nascimento	Alessandro Guimarães	Fernando Finkler
2019	Vitor Schizzi	Alessandro Guimarães	Alex Correia
2020	No race due to the COVID-19 pandemic in Brazil		
2021	Kléber Ramos	Antonio Garnero	Cristian Egídio
2022	Vinícius Rangel	Cristian Egídio	Halysson Ferreira
2023	Caio Godoy	Rodrigo Melo	Kléber Ramos
2024	Roberto Pinheiro	Felipe Marques	Alessandro Guimarães

=== U23 ===
Year	Gold	Silver	Bronze
2011	Carlos Manarelli	Edson Ponciano	William Chiarello
2012	Joel Prado Júnior	Emerson Santos	André Almeida
2013	Joao Gaspar	André Almeida	Carlos Santos
2014	Marcelo Dill	André Almeida	Antônio Nascimento
2015	Rodrigo Quirino	Fernando Finkler	Eduardo Pini
2016	Caio Godoy	Rafael Rosa	Victor Souza
2017	Caio Godoy	Raphael Pires	Gabriel Silva
2018	Fernando Finkler	Leonardo Finkler	Gabriel Silva
2019	Vito Zucco	Pedro Rossi	Samuel Stachera
2020	No race		
2021	Igor Molina	Orlando Neto	Pedro Leme
2022	Vinicius Rangel	Pedro Leme	Felipe Ronzani
2023	Pedro Leme	Victor Paula	Vitor Pompeu
2024	Wilson Sousa	Otávio Gonzeli	Pedro Henrique Kunst

== Women ==
Year	Gold	Silver	Bronze
2000	Carla Camargo	Cleonides Duarte	Vera Lang
2001	Carla Camargo	Vera Lang	Cleonides Duarte
2002	No race		
2003	Uenia Fernandes	Maria Luzia Evangelista	Lair Da Silva
2004	No race		
2005	Clemilda Fernandes	Luciene Ferreira da Silva	Patricia Moreira
2006	Erika Gramiscelli	Valquiria Pardial	Clemilda Fernandes
2007	Valquiria Pardial	Janildes Fernandes	Luciene Ferreira da Silva
2008	Clemilda Fernandes	Luciene Ferreira da Silva	Uenia Fernandes
2009	Janildes Fernandes	Clemilda Fernandes	Debora Gerhard
2010	Janildes Fernandes	Debora Gerhard	Fernanda Souza
2011	Tatiani Lobo	Janildes Fernandes	Luciene Ferreira da Silva
2012	Luciene Ferreira da Silva	Camila Ferreira	Flávia Oliveira
2013	Luciene Ferreira da Silva	Clemilda Fernandes	Flávia Oliveira
2014	Márcia Fernandes	Flávia Oliveira	Luciene Ferreira da Silva
2015	Clemilda Fernandes	Luciene Ferreira da Silva	Flávia Oliveira
2016	Clemilda Fernandes	Ana Paula Polegatch	Taise Benato
2017	Clemilda Fernandes	Ana Paula Polegatch	Márcia Fernandes
2018	Flávia Oliveira	Tatielle Souza	Camila Ferreira
2019	Danilas Ferreira	Flávia Oliveira	Cristiane Pereira
2020	No race due to the COVID-19 pandemic in Brazil		
2021	Ana Paula Polegatch	Adriele Alves Mendes	Taise Maiara Benato
2022	Aline Mariga	Wellyda Santos	Talia da Luz de Oliveira
2023	Ana Vitória Magalhães	Ana Paula Casetta	Wellyda Rodrigues
2024	Tamires Fanny Radatz	Taise Maiara Benato	Marcia Fernandes

== See also ==
- Brazilian National Time Trial Championships
- National road cycling championships
