= Cristian Egídio =

Brazilian cyclist (born 1987)

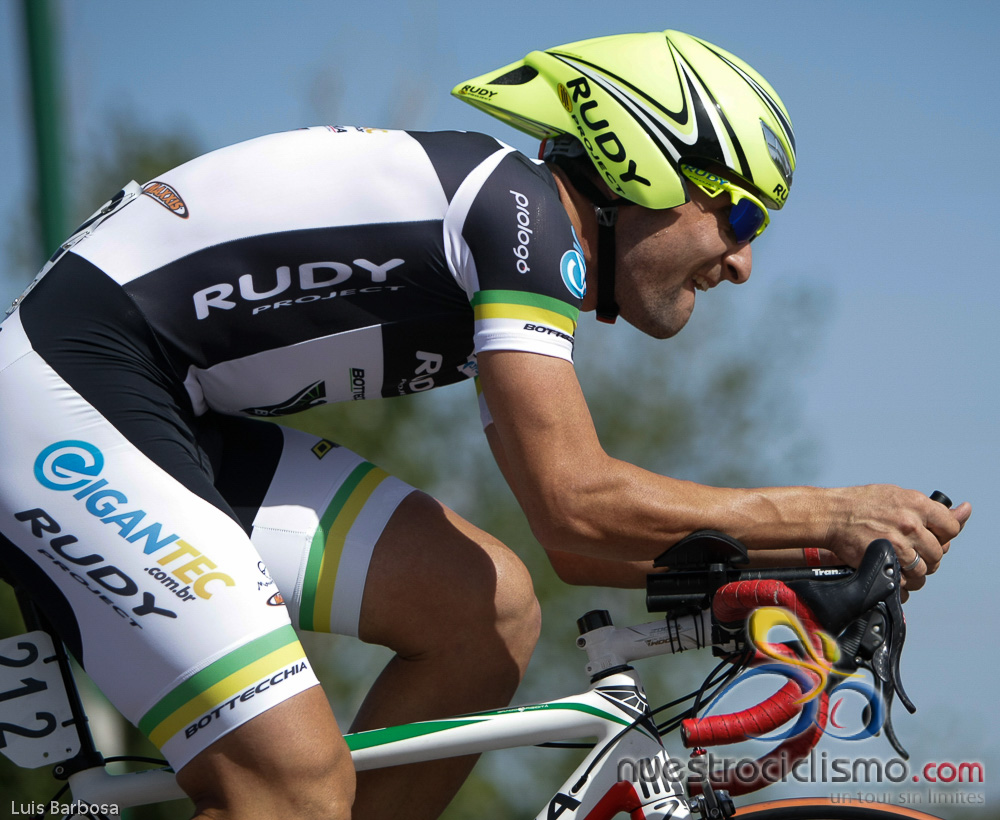
- Egídio at the 2014 Tour de San Luis

Personal information
- Full name: Cristian Egídio da Rosa
- Born: 4 September 1987 (age 39) Arapongas, Brazil

Cycling career
- Sport: Cycling
- Current team: Localiza Meoo / Swift Pro Cycling
- Disciplines: Road; Track
- Role: Rider

Amateur teams
- 2015–2016: DataRo Brazil
- 2017–2018: Sao Francisco Saude–Klabin
- 2020–2021: Taubaté Cycling Team

Professional teams
- 2011: Clube DataRo de Ciclismo–Foz do Iguaçu
- 2013–2014: Clube DataRo de Ciclismo
- 2019: São Francisco Saúde–Klabin–SME Ribeirão Preto
- 2022–: Swift Carbon Pro Cycling Brasil

Cristian Egídio da Rosa (born 4 September 1987) is a Brazilian racing cyclist, who currently rides for UCI Continental team Localiza Meoo / Swift Pro Cycling. He rode at the 2014 UCI Road World Championships.

== Major results ==
2009
National Under-23 Road Championships

1st Road race
3rd Time trial

2010
1st Stage 4 Tour de Santa Catarina
8th Overall Tour do Rio
2012
Tour do Brasil

1st Mountains classification
1st Stage 5

2013
1st Overall Vuelta del Uruguay
2014
8th Time trial, Pan American Road Championships
2015
3rd Copa América de Ciclismo
9th Road race, Pan American Road Championships
2016
8th Overall Vuelta del Uruguay
2017
1st Mountains classification Vuelta del Uruguay
2nd Time trial, National Road Championships
2018
1st Stage 3 Vuelta del Uruguay
2nd Time trial, National Road Championships
10th Time trial, Pan American Road Championships
2019
2nd Time trial, National Road Championships
2nd Overall Vuelta del Uruguay
2021
National Road Championships

2nd Time trial
3rd Road race

7th Time trial, Pan American Road Championships
2022
5th Overall Vuelta a Formosa Internacional
