= Caio Godoy =

Brazilian cyclist (born 1995)

Personal information
- Full name: Caio Godoy Ormenese
- Born: 24 April 1995 (age 31) Campinas, São Paulo, Brazil
- Height: 1.77 m (5 ft 10 in)
- Weight: 62 kg (137 lb)

Cycling career
- Sport: Cycling
- Current team: Localiza Meoo / Swift Pro Cycling
- Discipline: Road
- Role: Rider

Amateur teams
- 2022: Rosana Merino Sports
- 2014–2016: World Cycling Centre

Professional teams
- 2014: Clube DataRo–Bottecchia
- 2015: Bretagne–Séché Environnement (stagiaire)
- 2017–2018: Soul Brasil Pro Cycling
- 2023–: Swift Carbon Pro Cycling Brasil

Caio Godoy Ormenese (born 24 April 1995) is a Brazilian road cyclist, who currently rides for UCI Continental team Localiza Meoo / Swift Pro Cycling.

Godoy was previously suspended from cycling from 31 March 2018 until 30 March 2022.

== Biography ==
Caio Godoy was born on April 24, 1995. He got his first MTB bike when he was 8 years old, as a gift from his parents. With 10 years old, Caio got a road bike from his parents and on 13 years old he moved to a city to be part of a junior cyclist team for the Iracemapolis city.

When he was 15 years old, Caio was hired on Hidropell Criciuma Team, where he raced until he was 18 years old. During his time with Criciuma team he showed results on national and international races.

In 2018, he was provisionally suspended by the Brazilian Cycling Federation after having tested positive for recreational substances during the Vuelta del Uruguay. Godoy claimed to have drunk mate mixed with coca leaves without knowing. He was later suspended for four years until March 30, 2022.

Since then, he dedicated for triathlon training, and in 2022 Caio made his debut on Triathlon races on an IronMan 70.3 Florianopolis, making it on 04:10:21, with 13th on Overall Rank, third in his age group M25-29.

In May 2022, Caio completed his first Ironman race, in 9:02:42h, with another third place in his age group M25-29.

In 2023, he returned to road cycling after his suspension was lifted, joining UCI Continental team Swift Carbon Pro Cycling Brasil.

== Major results ==
2012
1st Road race, National Junior Road Championships
2016
National Under-23 Road Championships

1st Time trial
1st Road race

2016
5th Road race, National Road Championships
5th Road race, Campeonato Panamericano de Ruta Under-23
2017
National Under-23 Road Championships

1st Road race
3rd Time trial

Campeonato Panamericano de Ruta Under-23

5th Road race
6th Time trial

2023
1st Road race, National Road Championships
