= André Almeida (cyclist) =

Brazilian cyclist (born 1992)

Personal information
- Full name: André de Souza Almeida
- Born: 16 December 1992 (age 33) Florianópolis, Brazil

Cycling career
- Sport: Cycling
- Current team: Soul Cycles–Santos
- Discipline: Road
- Role: Rider

Amateur teams
- 2013: Barueri–Penks–New Millen
- 2023–: Santos Fupes

Professional team
- 2014–2018: Funvic Brasilinvest–São José dos Campos

André de Souza Almeida (born 16 December 1992) is a Brazilian cyclist, who currently rides for club team Soul Cycles–Santos.

Almeida served a suspension December 2018 through January 2022 due to a hemoglobin level in his biological passport which was found to be too low in 2016.

== Major results ==
2012
3rd Road race, National Under-23 Road Championships
2013
National Under-23 Road Championships

1st Time trial
2nd Road race

2014
2nd Road race, National Under-23 Road Championships
2nd Overall Giro do Interior de São Paulo
4th Overall Volta Ciclística Internacional do Rio Grande do Sul
