= Vinícius Rangel =

Brazilian cyclist (born 2001)

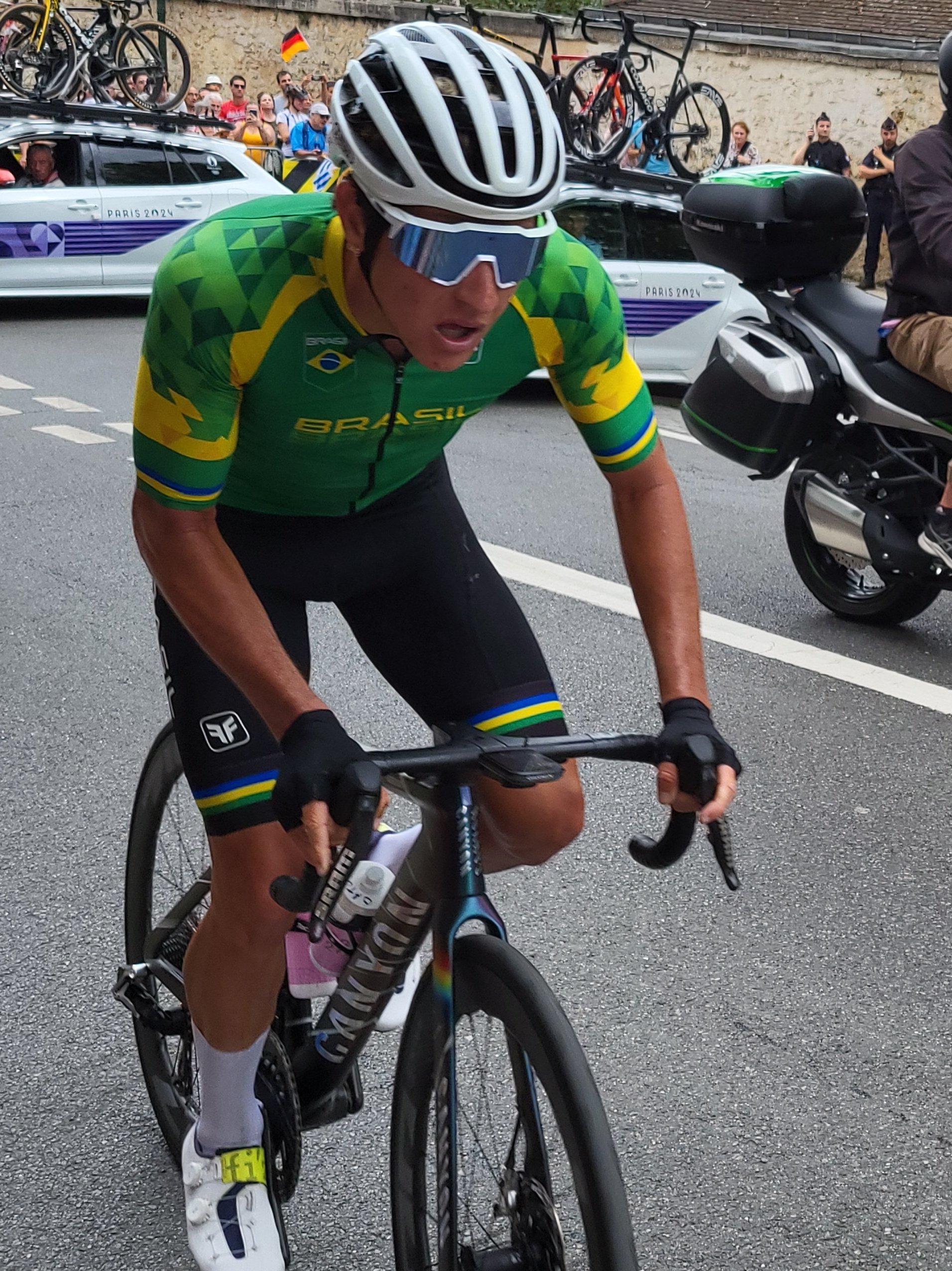
- Rangel at the 2024 Summer Olympics

Personal information
- Full name: Vinícius Rangel Costa
- Born: 26 May 2001 (age 25) Cabo Frio, Brazil
- Height: 1.78 m (5 ft 10 in)
- Weight: 64 kg (141 lb)

Cycling career
- Sport: Cycling
- Discipline: Road
- Role: Rider

Amateur teams
- 2019–2020: Valverde Team–Tierra Fecundis
- 2021: Telcom–On Clima–Osés Const

Professional team
- 2022–2024: Movistar Team

Major wins
- One-day races and Classics National Road Race Championships (2022)

Vinícius Rangel Costa (born 26 May 2001) is a Brazilian road cyclist, who last rode for UCI WorldTeam Movistar Team.

He began cycling around the age of 13 when encouraged to take up the sport by a cousin.

== Major results ==
2018
National Junior Road Championships

2nd Road race
2nd Time trial

4th Time trial, Pan American Junior Road Championships
2019
Pan American Junior Road Championships

3rd Road race
3rd Time trial

2021
1st Overall Vuelta a Cantabria
1st Overall Vuelta a Salamanca

1st Stages 2 & 3

9th Road race, UCI World Under-23 Road Championships
2022
National Road Championships

1st Road race
3rd Time trial

1st Time trial, National Under-23 Road Championships
