= Antonio Garnero =

Brazilian road cyclist (born 1983)

Personal information
- Full name: Antonio Fernando Prestes Garnero
- Born: 17 August 1983 (age 43) São Paulo, Brazil

Cycling career
- Sport: Cycling
- Discipline: Road
- Role: Rider

Amateur teams
- 2015: ECT–Taubaté
- 2016–2017: São Francisco-Saúde-Powerade-SMR
- 2017: ECT–Taubaté
- 2020: Memorial Santos Fupes

Professional team
- 2013–2015: Funvic Brasilinvest–São José dos Campos

Antonio Fernando Prestes Garnero (born 17 August 1983) is a Brazilian road cyclist. He competed in the road race at the 2015 UCI Road World Championships, but did not finish. He also won the Brazilian National Road Race Championships in 2014.

== Major results ==
2014
1st Road race, National Road Championships
2021
2nd Road race, National Road Championships
