= Luiz Amorim =

Brazilian bicycle racer (born 1977)

Personal information
- Full name: Luiz Carlos Tavares Ferrão Amorim
- Born: 27 September 1977 (age 49) Osasco, Brazil

Cycling career
- Sport: Cycling
- Discipline: Road
- Role: Rider
- Rider type: Time trialist

Amateur teams
- 2008: Cesc–Sundown–N Caixa–Calipso–Maxxis
- 2009: Scott–Marcondes Cesar–São José dos Campos
- 2015–2016: Osasco–Penks–Eqmax–Orbea–Maxxis–Calypso
- 2017: SBC Audax–Sao Bernardo

Professional teams
- 2007: Scott–Marcondes Cesar–São José dos Campos
- 2010: Scott–Marcondes Cesar–São José dos Campos
Medal record
Men's road bicycle racing
Representing Brazil
Pan American Championships
Bronze medal – third place	2008 Montevideo	Time trial

Luiz Carlos Tavares Ferrão Amorim (born 27 September 1977) is a Brazilian former professional road cyclist. He most notably won the Brazilian National Time Trial Championships five times.

== Major results ==
2003
1st Time trial, National Road Championships
1st Stage 6 (ITT) Tour de Santa Catarina
2004
1st Time trial, National Road Championships
1st Overall Torneio de Verão

1st Stage 4a (ITT)

2nd Overall Volta do Rio de Janeiro
6th Overall Tour do Brasil

1st Stage 6 (ITT)

2005
3rd Time trial, National Road Championships
9th Time trial, Pan American Road Championships
2006
2nd Time trial, National Road Championships
2007
5th Time trial, National Road Championships
2008
3rd Time trial, Pan American Road Championships
2009
1st Overall Giro do Interior de São Paulo

1st Stage 4 (ITT)

2010
1st Time trial, National Road Championships
2012
1st Time trial, National Road Championships
7th Overall Vuelta del Uruguay
2013
1st Time trial, National Road Championships
2014
3rd Time trial, National Road Championships
2016
3rd Time trial, National Road Championships
