= Soledade, Paraíba =

Coordinates: 7°03′25″S 36°21′46″W

- Municipality
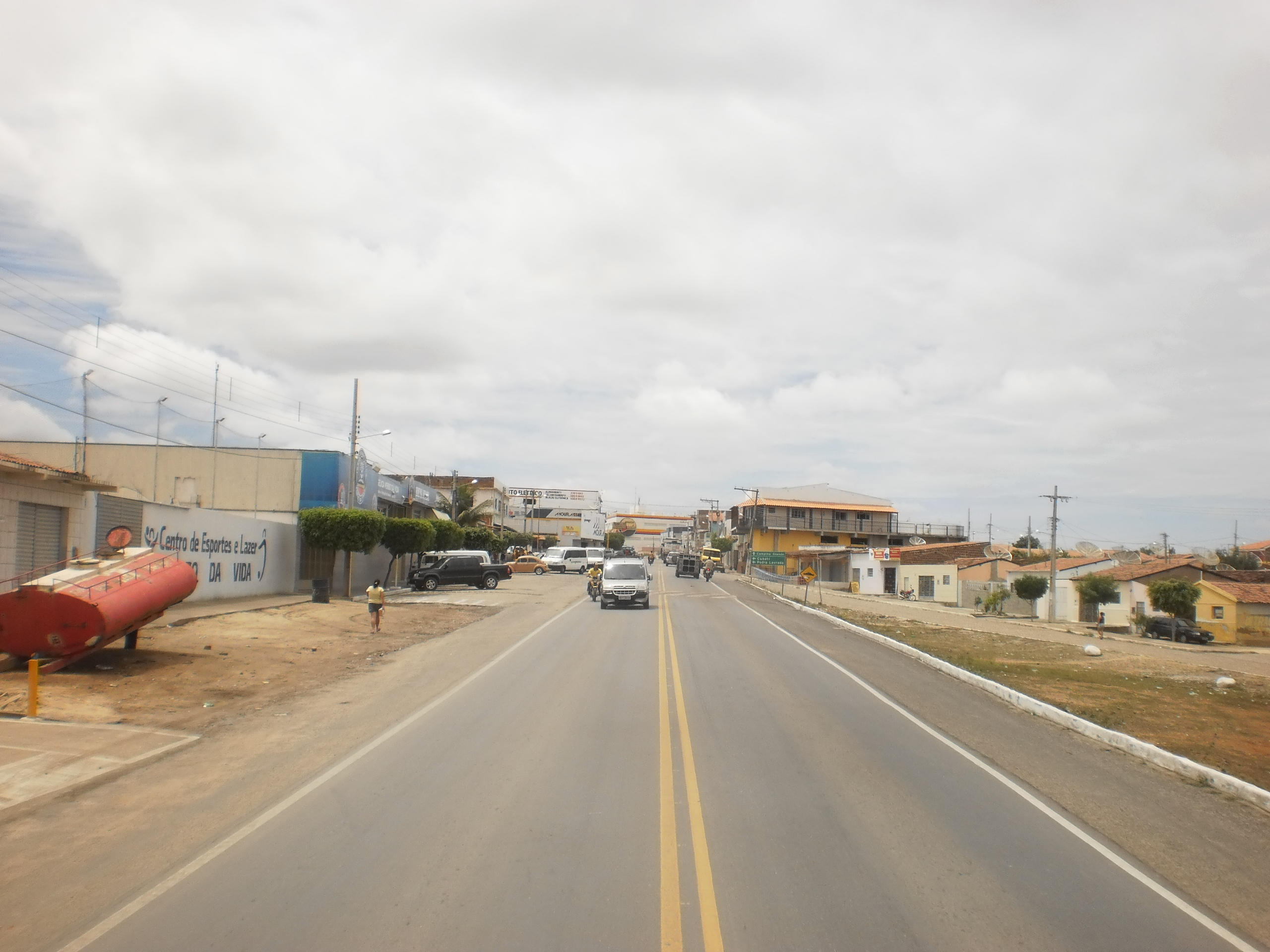

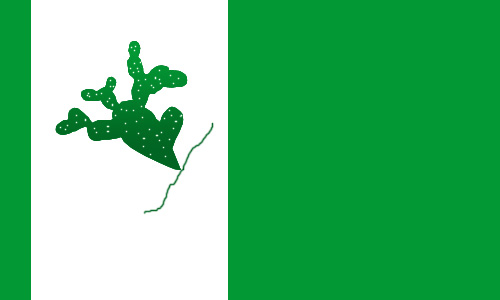
- Flag Coat of arms
- Interactive map of Soledade, Paraíba
- Country: Brazil
- Region: Northeast
- State: Paraíba
- Mesoregion: Agreste Paraibano

Population (2020)
  - Total: 15,102
- Time zone: UTC−3 (BRT)

Soledade (Central northeastern portuguese pronunciation: [suliˈdɐdĭ]) is a municipality in the state of Paraíba in the Northeast Region of Brazil. Acquired as part of a farm purchased by João de Sousa, the land was donated to a church, which planned to build a chapel. However, a cholera outbreak in 1864 meant that the first use of the land would be a cemetery.

== See also ==
- List of municipalities in Paraíba
