= Ana Vitória Magalhães =

Brazilian cyclist (born 2000)

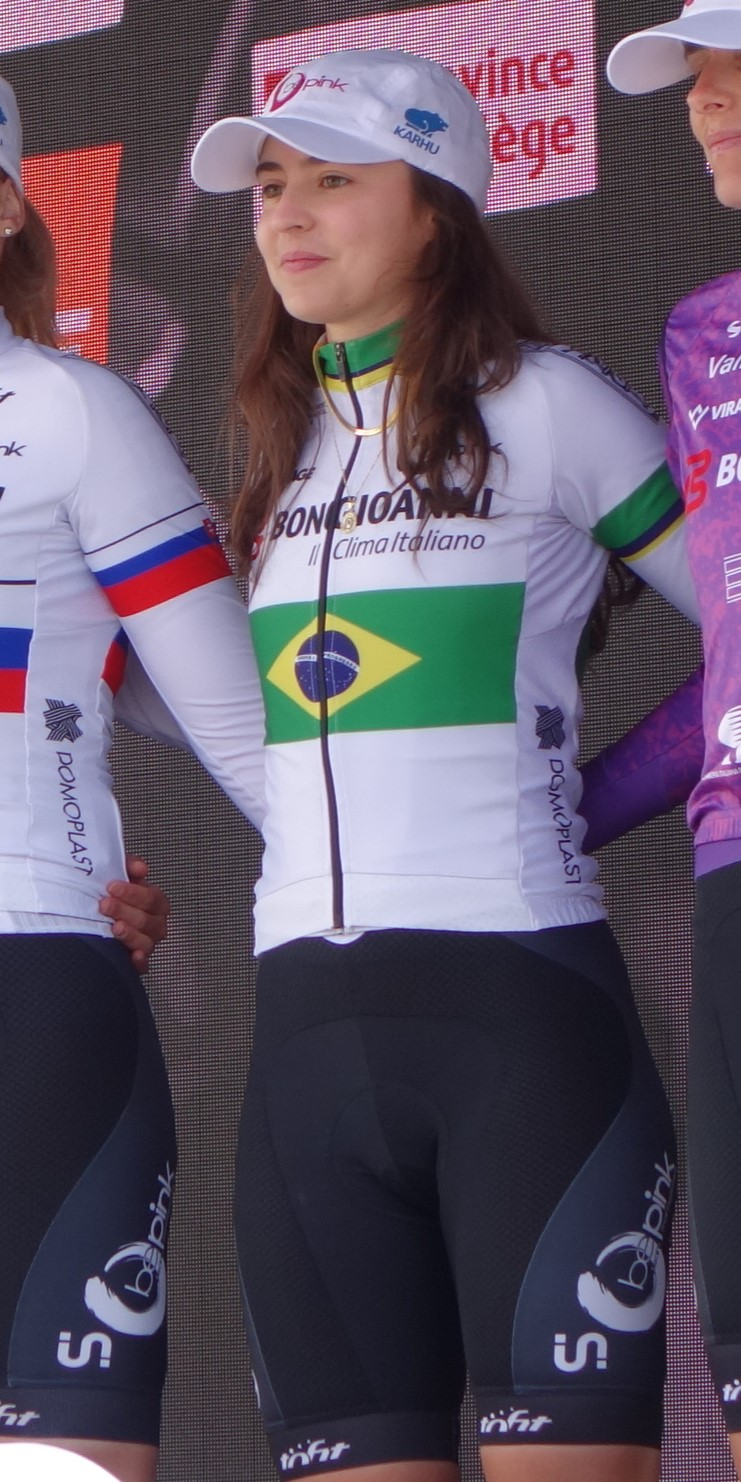
- Magalhães in 2024

Personal information
- Nickname: Tota
- Born: Ana Vitória Gouvea Vieira Almeida Magalhães; October 24, 2000 (age 25)

Cycling career
- Sport: Cycling
- Current team: Movistar Team
- Disciplines: Road; Track
- Role: Rider

Professional teams
- 2022: Soltec Team
- 2023: Bizkaia–Durango
- 2024: Bepink–Bongioanni
- 2025–: Movistar Team

Ana Vitória Gouvea Vieira Almeida Magalhães (born 24 October 2000) is a Brazilian road and track cyclist, who currently rides for UCI Women's WorldTeam Movistar Team. She was selected to compete in the women's road race at the 2024 Summer Olympics. She also competed in the Giro d'Italia Women and in the La Vuelta Femenina in 2023, 2024 and 2025. In 2025, Magalhães became the first Brazilian cyclist to compete in the Tour de France Femmes. She is also a two-time elite level national champion, with one title each in the road race and time trial.

== Major results ==
2021
National Under-23 Road Championships

1st Road race
1st Time trial

5th Time trial, National Road Championships
Junior Pan American Games

4th Time trial
10th Road race

2022
National Under-23 Road Championships

1st Road race
1st Time trial

4th Time trial, National Road Championships
Pan American Road Championships

6th Road race
8th Time trial

9th Time trial, South American Games
2023
National Road Championships

1st Road race
4th Time trial

2nd GP Urubici de Ciclismo Feminina
2nd GP Internacional de Ciclismo de Santa Catarina Feminina
3rd Grand Tour de Ciclismo de SC Feminina
4th Road race, Pan American Games
5th Road race, Pan American Road Championships
2024
1st Time trial, National Road Championships
