= Valcemar Silva =

Brazilian cyclist

Personal information
- Full name: Valcemar Justino da Silva
- Born: February 27, 1968 (age 58) Palmeira d'Oeste, SP, Brazil

Cycling career
- Sport: Cycling
- Current team: Sales Supermercados-Pinarello-BH
- Discipline: Road
- Role: Rider

Professional teams
- 1996–2001: Adeblu\BLUMENAU
- 2002–2003: Pedal-Bike Shop-São José dos Campos
- 2004–2007: Scott–Marcondes Cesar–São José dos Campos
- 2008–: Sales Supermercados-Pinarello-BH

Major wins
- (Brazil) National Road Champion (2008)

Valcemar Justino da Silva (born February 27, 1968) is a Brazilian professional racing cyclist for the Supermecados Sales-Pinarello-BH team.

== Career highlights ==
2008 – Sales Supermercados-Pinarello-BH
National Championship, Road, Elite, Brazil (BRA)
2006 – Scott–Marcondes Cesar–São José dos Campos
1st overall GC – Volta Internacional de Porto Alegre (BRA)
2002 – Pedal Bike Shop-São José dos Campos
1st overall GC – Volta Internacional de Porto Alegre (BRA)
1996 –
1st overall GC – Volta Internacional de Porto Alegre (BRA)
