= Magno Nazaret =

Brazilian racing cyclist

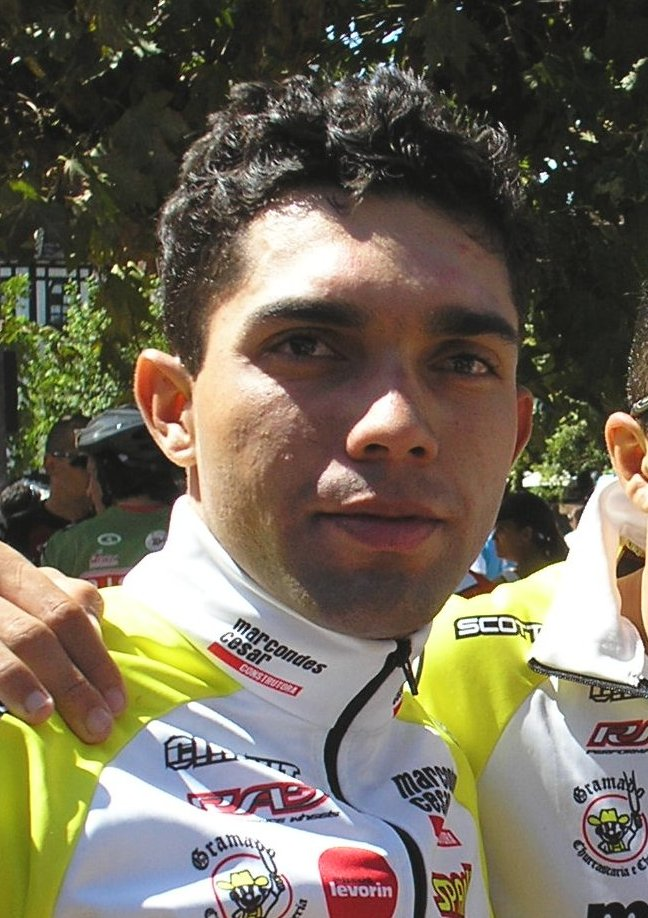

Personal information
- Full name: Magno Prado Nazaret
- Born: January 17, 1986 (age 40) Dourados, Mato Grosso do Sul, Brazil
- Height: 1.72 m (5 ft 8 in)
- Weight: 65 kg (143 lb)

Cycling career
- Sport: Cycling
- Current team: Localiza Meoo / Swift Pro Cycling
- Discipline: Road
- Role: Rider

Amateur teams
- 2004: Memorial–Santos
- 2005–2006: Scott–Marcondes César–São José dos Campos

Professional teams
- 2007–2008: Scott–Marcondes Cesar–São José dos Campos
- 2010: Scott–Marcondes Cesar–São José dos Campos
- 2011–2017: Funvic–Pindamonhangaba
- 2019–2020: Sindicato de Empleados Publicos de San Juan
- 2022–: Swift Carbon Pro Cycling Brasil

Major wins
- Vuelta al Uruguay (2012) Tour do Brasil (2012, 2014)
Medal record
Representing Brazil
Men's road cycling
Pan American Games
Silver medal – second place	2019 Lima	Time trial
Pan American Championships
Gold medal – first place	2006 São Paulo	Individual time trial U23
Silver medal – second place	2006 São Paulo	Individual time trial
Silver medal – second place	2012 Mar del Plata	Individual time trial
Military World Games
Gold medal – first place	2015 Mungyeong	Individual time trial

Magno Prado Nazaret (born January 17, 1986) is a Brazilian professional racing cyclist, who currently rides for UCI Continental team Localiza Meoo / Swift Pro Cycling.

== Major results ==
2005
3rd Time trial, National Under-23 Road Championships
2006
Pan American Road Championships

1st Under-23 time trial
2nd Time trial

3rd Time trial, National Road Championships
3rd Overall Volta de Porto Alegre
2007
3rd Overall Vuelta Ciclista Líder al Sur
3rd Overall Volta do Rio de Janeiro
2008
1st Young rider classification, Tour de San Luis
3rd Overall Giro do Interior São Paulo
2010
1st Stage 5b (ITT) Rutas de América
2011
1st Time trial, National Road Championships
1st Stage 4 Tour do Rio
2012
1st Overall Vuelta del Uruguay

1st Stage 8 (ITT)

1st Overall Tour do Brasil

1st Stage 3 (ITT)

2nd Time trial, Pan American Road Championships
2014
1st Overall Tour do Brasil

1st Stages 3 & 4 (ITT)

2015
1st Time trial, National Road Championships
1st Time trial, Military World Games
2017
1st Time trial, National Road Championships
1st Overall Vuelta del Uruguay

1st Stage 6 (ITT)

8th Overall Tour of China II
8th Overall Tour of Taihu Lake
2019
1st Overall Vuelta a la Bebida

1st Stage 1
