= Ana Paula Polegatch =

Brazilian cyclist (born 1988)

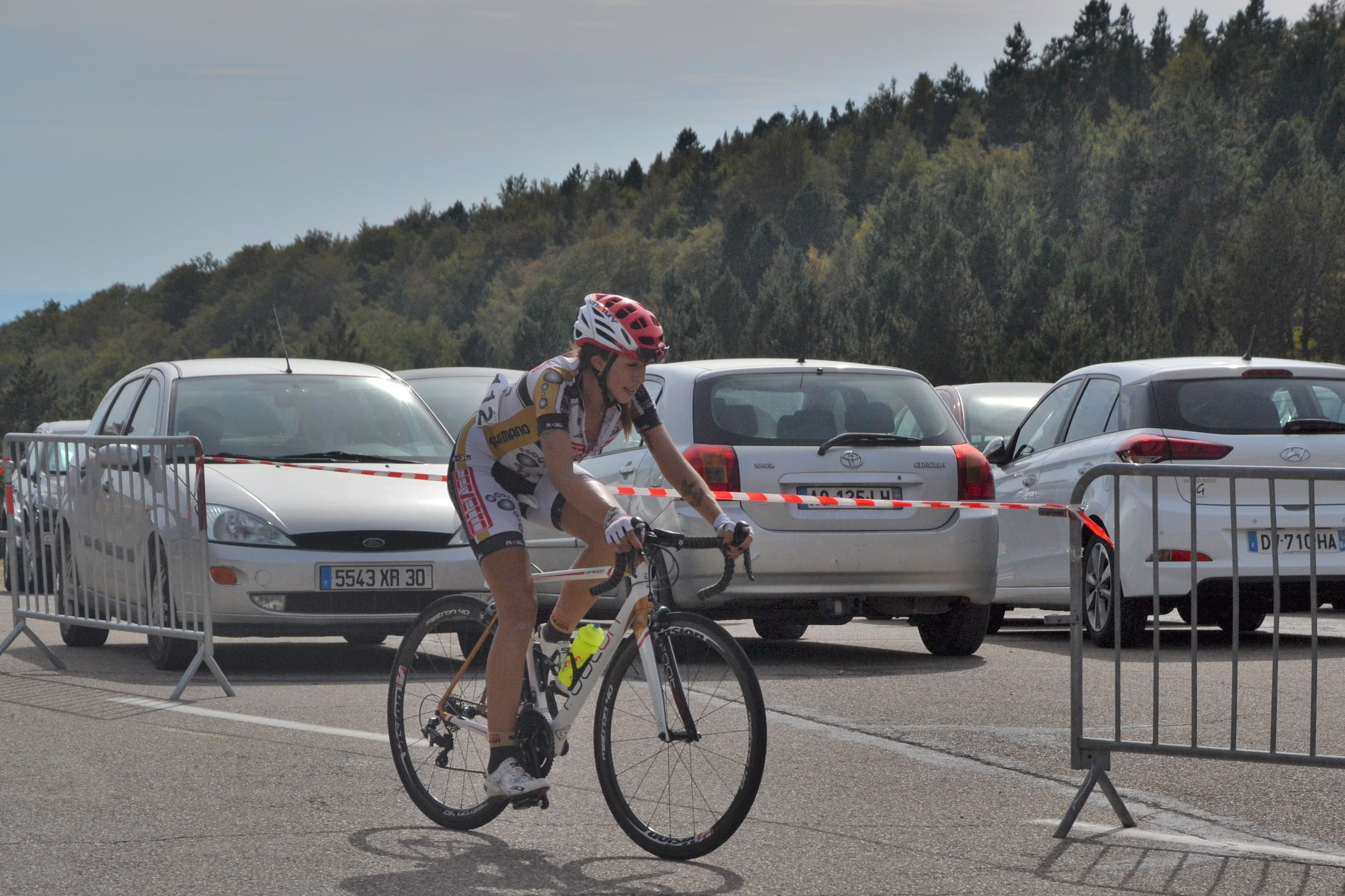
- Polegatch in 2016.

Personal information
- Full name: Ana Paula Polegatch
- Born: 21 October 1988 (age 37) Guarapuava, Brazil

Cycling career
- Sport: Cycling
- Current team: UniFunvic–Gelog–Pindamonhangaba
- Disciplines: Road; Track
- Role: Rider

Amateur teams
- 2017–2018: Memorial–Santos/Fupes
- 2022–: UniFunvic–Gelog–Pindamonhangaba

Professional teams
- 2016: Servetto Footon
- 2019–2021: Memorial–Santos
Medal record
Representing Brazil
Women's road cycling
Military World Games
Silver medal – second place	2015 Mungyeong	Individual time trial

Ana Paula Polegatch (born 21 October 1988) is a Brazilian road cyclist, who rides for Brazilian amateur team UniFunvic–Gelog–Pindamonhangaba. She won the Brazilian National Time Trial Championships in 2014, 2017, 2021 and 2022.

== Major results ==
2012
National Road Championships

3rd Time trial
4th Road race

2014
1st Time trial, National Road Championships
2015
2nd Time trial, Military World Games
2nd Time trial, National Road Championships
3rd Overall Tour Femenino de San Luis
4th Time trial, Pan American Road Championships
5th Time trial, Pan American Games
2016
1st Overall Torneio de Veräo
1st 1º de Maio em Indaiatuba
National Road Championships

2nd Road race
2nd Time trial

2017
1st Madison, National Track Championships
National Road Championships

1st Time trial
2nd Road race

2nd Gran Cup de Ciclismo
2nd 1º de Maio em Indaiatuba
2018
2nd Time trial, National Road Championships
2nd Overall Tour Internacional Femenino de Uruguay

1st Stages 2 (ITT) & 4

7th Time trial, Pan American Road Championships
2019
3rd Time trial, National Road Championships
3rd Chabany Race
6th Time trial, Pan American Road Championships
2021
National Road Championships

1st Time trial
1st Road race

3rd Team pursuit, National Track Championships
2022
1st Time trial, National Road Championships
5th Time trial, South American Games
