= Brazilian National Time Trial Championships =

National road cycling championship in Brazil

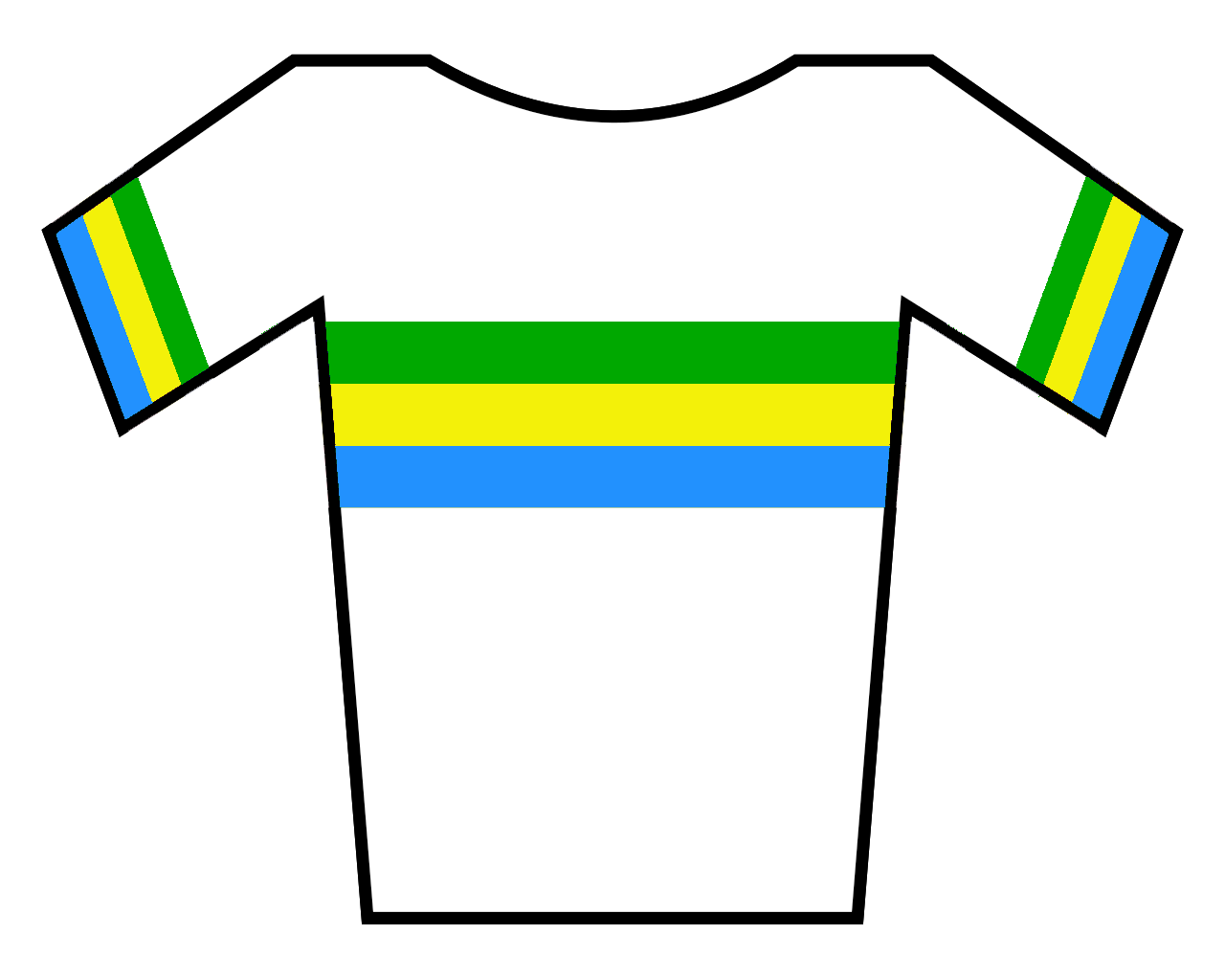

The Brazilian National Time Trial Championships have been held since 2000.

== Men ==
Year	Gold	Silver	Bronze
2000	Daniel Gonçalves	Jefferson Misiake	Tony Azevedo
2001	Cássio Freitas	Márcio May	Daniel Gonçalves
2002	No race		
2003	Luis Tavares Amorim	Márcio May	Reginaldo Grellman
2004	Luis Tavares Amorim	Soelito Gohr	Elivelton Pedro
2005	Pedro Autran Nicacio	Márcio May	Luis Tavares Amorim
2006	Pedro Autran Nicacio	Luis Tavares Amorim	Magno Nazaret
2007	Pedro Autran Nicacio	Itamar Calado	Edson Luiz Corradi
2008	Cleberson Weber	Pedro Autran Nicacio	Rodrigo Nascimento
2009	Rodrigo Nascimento	Marcos Novello	Alex Arseno
2010	Luis Tavares Amorim	Pedro Autran Nicacio	Magno Nazaret
2011	Magno Nazaret	Carlos Manarelli	Rafael Gasparini
2012	Luis Tavares Amorim	Patrick Oyakaua	Flávio Cardoso
2013	Luis Tavares Amorim	Magno Nazaret	Rodrigo Nascimento
2014	Pedro Autran Nicacio	Rodrigo Nascimento	Luis Tavares Amorim
2015	Magno Nazaret	Marcos Novello	Rodrigo Nascimento
2016	Rodrigo Nascimento	Marcos Novello	Luis Tavares Amorim
2017	Magno Nazaret	Cristian Egídio	Mauricio Knapp
2018	Lauro Chaman	Cristian Egídio	Flávio Cardoso
2019	André Gohr	Cristian Egídio	Rodrigo Nascimento
2020	No race due to the COVID-19 pandemic in Brazil		
2021	Lauro Chaman	Cristian Egídio	André Gohr
2022	Lauro Chaman	Cristian Egídio	Vinícius Rangel
2023	Diego Mendes	Lauro Chaman	Carlos Manarelli
2024	Diego Mendes	João Pedro Rossi	André Gohr

=== U23 ===
Year	Gold	Silver	Bronze
2015	Fernando Finkler	Lucas Motta	Endrigo Pereira
2016	Caio Godoy	Endrigo Pereira	Lucas Motta
2018	André Gohr	Leonardo Finkler	Gabriel Machado
2019	Gabriel Machado	Fábio Dalamaria	Bruno Campos de Sá
2020	No race due to the COVID-19 pandemic in Brazil		
2021	João Pedro Rossi	Pedro Leme	Otávio Gonzeli
2022	Vinícius Rangel	Pedro Leme	Gabriel Sousa Silva
2023	Pedro Leme	Luan Rodrigues	Pedro Oliveira
2024	Luan Carlos Rodrigues Silva	Victor Paula	Matheus Keler

== Women ==
Year	Gold	Silver	Bronze
2005	Camila Rodrigues	Luciene Ferreira da Silva	Carla Camargo
2006	Debora Gerhard	Luciene Ferreira da Silva	
2007	Janildes Fernandes	Natalia Lima	Camila Rodrigues
2008	Camila Rodrigues	Aline Paroliz	Janildes Fernandes
2009	Aline Paroliz	Cristiane Pereira	Natalia Lima
2010	Debora Gerhard	Aline Paroliz	Fernanda Souza
2011	Luciene Ferreira da Silva	Rosane Kirch	Janildes Fernandes
2012	Luciene Ferreira da Silva	Uênia Fernandes	Ana Paula Polegatch
2013	Clemilda Fernandes	Fernanda Souza	Luciene Ferreira da Silva
2014	Ana Paula Polegatch	Clemilda Fernandes	Janildes Fernandes
2015	Daniela Lionço	Ana Paula Polegatch	Flávia Oliveira
2016	Clemilda Fernandes	Ana Paula Polegatch	Cristiane Pereira
2017	Ana Paula Polegatch	Clemilda Fernandes	Cristiane Pereira
2018	Tamires Radatz	Ana Paula Polegatch	Flávia Oliveira
2019	Tamires Radatz	Flávia Oliveira	Ana Paula Polegatch
2020	No race due to the COVID-19 pandemic in Brazil		
2021	Ana Paula Polegatch	Taise Benato	Tamires Radatz
2022	Ana Paula Polegatch	Tamires Radatz	Taise Benato
2023	Ana Paula Polegatch	Mariana Borges	Tamires Radatz
2024	Ana Vitória Magalhães	Tamires Radatz	Aline Mariga

== See also ==
- Brazilian National Road Race Championships
- National road cycling championships
