= Volta do Paraná =

Brazilian multi-day road cycling race

Volta Ciclística Internacional do Paraná
Race details
- Region: Brazil
- Discipline: Road
- Competition: UCI America Tour
- Type: One day race

History
- First edition: 2004
- Editions: 9
- Final edition: 2015
- First winner: Soelito Gohr (BRA)
- Most wins: No repeat winners
- Final winner: Rodrigo Araujo Melo (BRA)

The Volta Ciclística Internacional do Paraná was a stage race held between 2004 and 2010, and from 2014 to 2015 in Brazil. It was rated 2.2 and was part of the UCI America Tour.

== Winners ==
Year	Winner	Second	Third
2004	(Brazil) Soelito Gohr	(Brazil) José Dos Santos	(Uruguay) Miguel Direnna
2005	(Argentina) Mauricio Morandi	(Brazil) Antônio Nascimento	(Brazil) Mac Donald Trindade
2006	(Brazil) Márcio May	(Argentina) Jorge Giacinti	(Brazil) Alex Arsenio
2007	(Brazil) Renato Seabra	(Argentina) Gerardo Fernández	(Brazil) Patrique Azevedo
2008	(Brazil) Renato Aparecido	(Brazil) Fabrício Morandi	(Brazil) Jair Fernando
2009	(Brazil) Raul Cançado	(Brazil) Eduardo Sales	(Brazil) Marcos Novello
2010	(Chile) Marco Arriagada	(Argentina) Edgardo Simón	(Brazil) Alan Maniezzo
Not held between 2011 and 2013
2014	(Brazil) Carlos Manarelli	(Chile) Patricio González	(Brazil) Gregolry Panizo
2015	(Brazil) Rodrigo Araujo Melo	(Brazil) Rodrigo Nascimento	(Brazil) Carlos Manarelli
