= Swift Carbon Pro Cycling Brasil =

Brazilian cycling team

Team information
- UCI code: SCP
- Registered: Brazil
- Founded: 2022
- Discipline: Road
- Status: UCI Continental

Key personnel
- General manager: Marcelo Donnabella
- Team manager: Vanildo Vitorino Guedes

Team name history
- 2022–: Swift Carbon Pro Cycling Brasil

Swift Carbon Pro Cycling Brasil is a Brazilian cycling team established in 2022.

== Team roster ==
As of 28 February 2022.

Rider	Date of birth
Rafael Andriato (BRA)	20 October 1987 (age 38)
Luiz Cocuzzi (BRA)	2 August 1993 (age 33)
Rafael Augusto Braga (BRA)	15 July 1998 (age 28)
Orlando de Sousa (BRA)	23 May 2002 (age 24)
Pierre de Tarde (FRA)	18 April 1984 (age 42)
Cristian Egídio (BRA)	4 September 1987 (age 39)

Rider	Date of birth
Kacio Fonseca da Silva (BRA)	13 May 1994 (age 32)
Otavio Gonzeli (BRA)	27 January 2002 (age 24)
Magno Nazaret (BRA)	17 January 1986 (age 40)
João Rossi (BRA)	2 October 1999 (age 26)
Diogo Sclebin Costa Martins (BRA)	6 May 1982 (age 44)

== National Champions ==
2023

Chilean Time Trial, José Luis Rodríguez Aguilar
