= Gateway Cup =

Race details
- Date: Labor Day Weekend
- Region: St. Louis, Missouri
- Competition: National calendar
- Type: Criterium stage race
- Race director: Tim Ranek, Mel Trotier, Mike Weiss, Chris Clausen, Amy Strahan
- Web site: gatewaycup.com

History
- First edition: 1985
- Most recent: Alfredo Rodríguez (MEX)

The Gateway Cup is a four-day criterium cycling race held in St. Louis, Missouri over Labor Day weekend. There are five races each day based on ability, ranging from novices (Category 5 cyclists) to professionals (Category 1 cyclists). There are over $25,000 in prize money awarded over the four-day race.

The race is on an approximately one-mile closed course within four distinct St. Louis neighborhoods. The race duration varies from 30 minutes to 75 minutes.

== Winners (since 2012) ==
=== Men ===
Year	Winner	Second	Third
2012	(United States) Brad Huff	(United States) Isaac Howe	(United States) Sean Mazich
2013	(United States) Rahsaan Bahati	(New Zealand) Alexander Ray	(United States) Colton Barrett
2014	(United States) Ken Hanson	(United States) Luke Keough	(United States) Daniel Holloway
2015	(United States) Daniel Holloway	(Colombia) Carlos Alzate	(United States) Luke Keough
2016	(Slovenia) Aldo Ino Ilešič	(United States) Tyler Magner	(United States) Daniel Holloway
2017	(Colombia) Carlos Alzate	(Guatemala) Julio Padilla	(United States) Brad Huff
2018	(United States) Tyler Magner	(United States) Griffin Easter	(United States) Noah Granigan
2019	(Colombia) Bryan Gómez	(United States) Noah Granigan	(United States) Thomas Gibbons
2020	Cancelled		
2021	(United States) Cory Williams	(United States) Tyler Magner	(United States) Justin Williams
2022	(Mexico) Alfredo Rodríguez	(Venezuela) Clever Martínez	(Dominican Republic) César Marte

=== Women ===
Year	Winner	Second	Third
2014	(United States) Coryn Rivera	(United States) Samantha Schneider	(United States) Hannah Barnes
2015	(United States) Samantha Schneider	(United States) Leah Kirchmann	(New Zealand) Joanne Kiesanowski
2016	(United States) Samantha Schneider	(United States) Skylar Schneider	(Mexico) Yussely Mendivil
2017	(United States) Kendall Ryan	(Australia) Josie Talbot	(United States) Lauren Hall
2018	(United States) Skylar Schneider	(United States) Samantha Schneider	(United States) Leigh Ann Ganzar
2019	(New Zealand) Olivia Ray	(United Kingdom) Harriet Owen	(United States) Samantha Schneider
2020	Cancelled		
2021	(Chile) Paola Muñoz	(United States) Skylar Schneider	(United States) Danielle Morshead
2022	(Cuba) Marlies Mejías	(United States) Kaia Schmid	(United States) Danielle Morshead
