= TD Bank Mayor's Cup =

Former American cycling criterium race

Race details
- Date: September
- Region: New England, United States
- Discipline: Road race
- Competition: TD Bank Mayor's Cup
- Type: Criterium

History
- First edition: 2009
- Editions: 8
- Final edition: 2016
- First winner: (United States) Kyle Wamsley (United States) Tina Pic
- Most wins: (United States) Daniel Holloway (2 wins) (United States) Luke Keough (2 wins) (United States) Erica Allar (2 wins)
- Final winner: (United States) Brad Huff (United States) Samantha Schneider

The TD Bank Mayor's Cup was a cycling criterium held in Boston, Massachusetts between 2009 and 2016. The race was held in Downtown Boston with the course circling Boston City Hall and the general Government Center area. The race's name came from the main sponsors, TD Bank and the City of Boston. The race was held on the same weekend as Hub on Wheels, an annual bike ride along the Charles River.

Due to construction in the area, the 2017 edition was canceled and the race has not been held since.

The race was notable for offering equal payouts to the men's and women's field in 2010.

== Results ==
=== Men's Pro 1 Winner ===
Year	Country	Rider	Team
2009	United States	Kyle Wamsley	Colavita
2010	United States	Daniel Holloway	Bissell Pro Cycling
2011	United States	Ken Hanson	Jelly Belly (cycling team)
2012	United States	Luke Keough	Team Mountain Khakis/SmartStop
2013	United States	Luke Keough	UnitedHealthcare Pro Cycling (men's team)
2014	United States	Daniel Holloway	Athlete Octane Cycling
2015	Slovenia	Aldo Ino Ilešič	Altovelo-SeaSucker
2016	United States	Brad Huff	Rally Cycling (men's team)

=== Women's Pro 1/2 Winner ===
Year	Country	Rider	Team
2009	United States	Tina Pic	Colavita
2010	United States	Lauren Tamayo	Peanut Butter & Co.twenty12
2011	United States	Jen McRae	787 Racing
2012	United States	Erica Allar	RideClean/PatentIt.com
2013	United States	Erica Allar	Care4Cycling p/b Solomon
2014	United States	Coryn Rivera	UnitedHealthcare Pro Cycling (women's team)
2015	United Kingdom	Emma Grant	Colavita-Bianch p/b Fine Cookin
2016	United States	Samantha Schneider	ISCorp
