= Beanpot (ice hockey) =

Annual college ice hockey tournament in Boston

The Beanpot
- Sport: Ice hockey
- Founded: 1952; 74 years ago
- No. of teams: 4
- Most recent champion: Boston College Eagles (2026)

The Beanpot is an annual men's and women's ice hockey tournament among the four major college hockey teams of the Greater Boston area in the United States: the Boston University Terriers, Boston College Eagles, Harvard University Crimson, and Northeastern University Huskies.

The men's tournament is held annually since the 1952–53 season, usually during the first two Mondays in February. Games are played at TD Garden since 1996, except for 2021 when it was cancelled due to the COVID-19 pandemic. Boston College is the current men's Beanpot champion, having won the 2026 tournament. The women's tournament began in 1979, with the championship game being held at TD Garden since 2024. Harvard won the 2026 women's tournament in overtime against Boston University.

Due to the success of the hockey tournament, numerous other "Beanpots" have been contested in a number of other sports over the years, usually involving teams from the same four schools.

== Format ==
The competitors are:

- Boston University Terriers (58-time finalists, 32-time winners; last championship in 2025)
- Boston College Eagles (38-time finalists, 21-time winners; last championship in 2026)
- Harvard University Crimson (27-time finalists, 11-time winners; last championship in 2017)
- Northeastern University Huskies (23-time finalists, 9-time winners; last championship in 2024)

The tournament lasts two rounds, with first-round opponents being rotated from year to year. The second round features the consolation game and the championship game.

In addition to the tournament trophy, two individual awards are given out each year. The Eberly Trophy goes to the goaltender with the highest save percentage who plays in both of his team's games, while the Beanpot MVP is awarded to the tournament's most valuable player.

=== Overtime format ===
In 2020, a rule change was made dictating how any overtime periods were to be handled. Traditionally, a tied score after the end of regulation time would be followed by continuous sudden-death play, in 20-minute intervals. However, due to NCAA regulations governing the way tournament games are factored into pairwise calculation (the formula for determining post-season seeding), a standardized format was required for all mid-season tournaments across collegiate hockey. From 2020 on, all Beanpot games with a tied score after regulation would commence with a 5-minute overtime period, after which if there is no sudden-death score, the game shall be officially ruled a tie. Play may be continued after this 5-minute interval, but any statistics accrued will not be considered official, and the result of which will be solely for the purpose of determining tournament placement.

The effects of this change were felt immediately, as two games went to the "2nd" overtime period in the 2020 iteration of the tournament. Boston College and Boston University played to a 4–4 tie after five minutes of overtime, and BU emerged victorious in the unofficial 2nd period. The same result and score occurred in that year's Championship match, as Northeastern and Boston University skated to a 4–4 tie after the initial overtime; the Huskies then defeated the Terriers to claim the title.

In 2022, the third instance of the new overtime format came to be, as Boston College and Harvard tied 3–3 after five minutes of overtime in the Consolation game. However, the game was not continued to determine a 3rd-place winner due to time constraints for the Championship game. In years prior, it would have been necessary to continue play indefinitely, but given the now-unofficial status of doing so, it was deemed no longer prudent. The game was ruled the first - and potentially only - official tie in tournament history.

In 2023, the overtime rules were further amended to require the 5-minute overtime period to be played 3-on-3, rather than with the full 5-on-5 complement. Additionally, the rule was implemented that if matches ended in a tie after the 5-minute overtime, a three-round shootout would be used to determine the winner. The rule came into effect immediately in that year's title game, as Northeastern defeated Harvard 3–2 in a shootout to claim the Beanpot Championship.

In summary, only three tournament games have an unofficial, or special status. The BC-BU first round meeting and the Northeastern-BU championship from the 2020 tournament both played beyond the 5-minute overtime. As a result, BU and Northeastern each have 1 unofficial goal counted in tournament statistics. Craig Pantano's Eberly Award stat line also includes saves from the additional overtime period of the title game. The only other game with special status was the 2022 Consolation game between BC and Harvard, which simply ended a tie after a scoreless 5-minute overtime. Play was not continued, so no unofficial statistics were recorded. After the 2023 introduction of the shootout to determine a winner for all games, this will be the only official tie in tournament history, barring a further change in the rules.

== Men's Beanpot ==
=== History ===
The first Beanpot was contested at Boston Arena in December 1952, now known as Matthews Arena. No tournament was played during the 1953 calendar year. In 1952, the tournament was scheduled on the two nights after Christmas to occupy unused dates at the arena. The next two tournaments were held in January (1954 and 1955). All subsequent Beanpot games have been played in February (except 1978; see below).

The tournament quickly outgrew the 4,500 seating capacity of the Boston Arena and the second through 43rd Beanpots (1954 through 1995) were held at the old 14,000 seat Boston Garden. Since 1996, the Beanpot has been held at the Garden's replacement, the 17,500-seat TD Garden. The competition generally takes place on the first and second Mondays in February and often draws one of the largest crowds of the college hockey season outside of the men's Frozen Four.

The 1978 Beanpot has taken a mythic place in Boston sports lore, as several hundred fans were stuck in the Garden for several days after the Blizzard of 1978 dumped more than two feet of snow during the night of the first-round games. The championship and consolation games were moved to Wednesday, March 1.

Every championship game up until 2023 has featured either Boston College or Boston University. After 70 iterations of the tournament, the Northeastern Huskies and Harvard Crimson finally both emerged victorious in the Semifinal, and played each other for the title. The Huskies defeated the Crimson 3–2 in the tournament's first-ever shootout to determine the game's winner, let alone a championship. Conversely, the first meeting between BC and BU in the consolation game occurred, with the Eagles taking the 3rd-place in a 3–1 finish.

None of the four competing teams have won the NCAA Division I Men's Ice Hockey Championship without first winning the Beanpot trophy that season. With the exception of the 1949 Boston College Eagles (as the tournament had yet to be created), all five Boston University NCAA championships (1971, 1972, 1978, 1995, 2009), Boston College's four other NCAA championships (2001, 2008, 2010, 2012), and Harvard's sole 1989 NCAA championship, were all accompanied by a victory in the Beanpot title game. Northeastern has not yet won an NCAA championship. This phenomenon has led fans of the Beanpot schools to believe dreams for a national title hold water if they indeed succeed in February. Boston College head coach Jerry York has often referred to the beginning of February as "Trophy Season," in which the Beanpot title is the first of three trophies that he wishes his team to attain, the others being the Hockey East tournament trophy, and the NCAA tournament trophy.

Since the Beanpot's 1952 inception, the team rosters, once dominated by New Englanders and Canadians, have gradually evolved to include a greater cross-section of the United States as well as other countries. The 2020 Beanpot included players from Florida, Georgia, Idaho, Nevada, and Texas. Reflecting a trend across college hockey, where 117 European students were playing at the NCAA Division I level in 2020, the Boston University Terriers roster included Kasper Kotkansalo from Finland and Wilmer Skoog from Sweden who scored the winning goal in Boston University's overtime goal in their upset win against Boston College in the 2020 Beanpot semi-final. After the game, Skoog said "It was the biggest game of my life."

==== Boston University ====
Boston University has won 32 Men's Beanpot titles to date, winning their most recent title in 2025. Despite historical dominance, recent years have been less successful for the Terriers, winning only three out of ten Beanpot titles since 2015. However, the Terriers have still consistently remained competitive in the competition, reaching the title game in an additional 5 of those 10 years.

The beginning of BU's Beanpot dominance was also the first year on the ice for Jack Parker. Parker won titles in each of the three years he played for the Terriers, and after taking over as head coach in 1973–74, Parker won 21 more championships.

After winning the 2015 Beanpot title, the Terriers had overcome the "Beanpot Curse" and had the opportunity to contest the National Championship. However, a late collapse meant fellow Hockey East school Providence College walked away with their first NCAA title in program history. Over the next 3 years, Boston University lost consecutively in the Beanpot final to every other Beanpot school, in the order of BC-Harvard-Northeastern.

The Terriers' next Men's Beanpot title would only come in 2022, against Northeastern. Despite BU outshooting Northeastern, Northeastern goaltender Semptimphelter kept a shutout late into the 3rd period. With the teams tied at 0-0 (courtesy of a goal line save by Terrier forward Jay O'Brien), Boston University junior Jamie Armstrong found sophomore Dylan Peterson on a 2-on-1 to score the game's first goal with less than 3 minutes left. BU held on to win their 31st Beanpot title, in the process preventing Northeastern from winning their 4th consecutive title.

The 2025 Beanpot was a hotly anticipated matchup against #1 ranked Green Line rivals Boston College, coming just weeks after the Eagles convincingly swept the Terriers in a home-and-home series. The game started with BC taking the lead via a Perreault goal in under 10 minutes. Despite dominating the period, the Eagles only took a 1–0 lead into the locker room at intermission. Freshmen Brandon Svoboda and Cole Hutson scored consecutive goals in the second period to take the lead, Cole Eiserman and Gavin McCarthy added goals in the third to secure the 32nd Beanpot title. The teams and students were joined in celebration by program alumni and Calder hopefuls Macklin Celebrini and Lane Hutson.

==== Boston College ====
Boston College controlled the early years of the Beanpot, winning eight titles in the first thirteen tournaments. Following BU's dominance, the balance of power tipped back towards the Eagles for about a decade, when they won six titles in seven years between 2010 and 2016. During that stretch, BC won five consecutive titles from 2010 to 2014, losing out in the first round in 2015, and regaining the title in 2016. However, they went the following nine consecutive seasons without winning the tournament, only making the championship game three times in that span, before finally snapping the streak ten years later in 2026.

==== Harvard ====
Harvard shared some success with Boston College in the early years of the tournament, winning four titles in the first 10 years, as well as making the title game each of the first four tournaments and winning the very first title game. However, they have only seen sporadic success since, winning 11 titles in the tournament's history, most recently ending a 24-year championship drought in 2017. They had only made the title game three times since their previous victory in 1993: '94, '98, and '08.

==== Northeastern ====
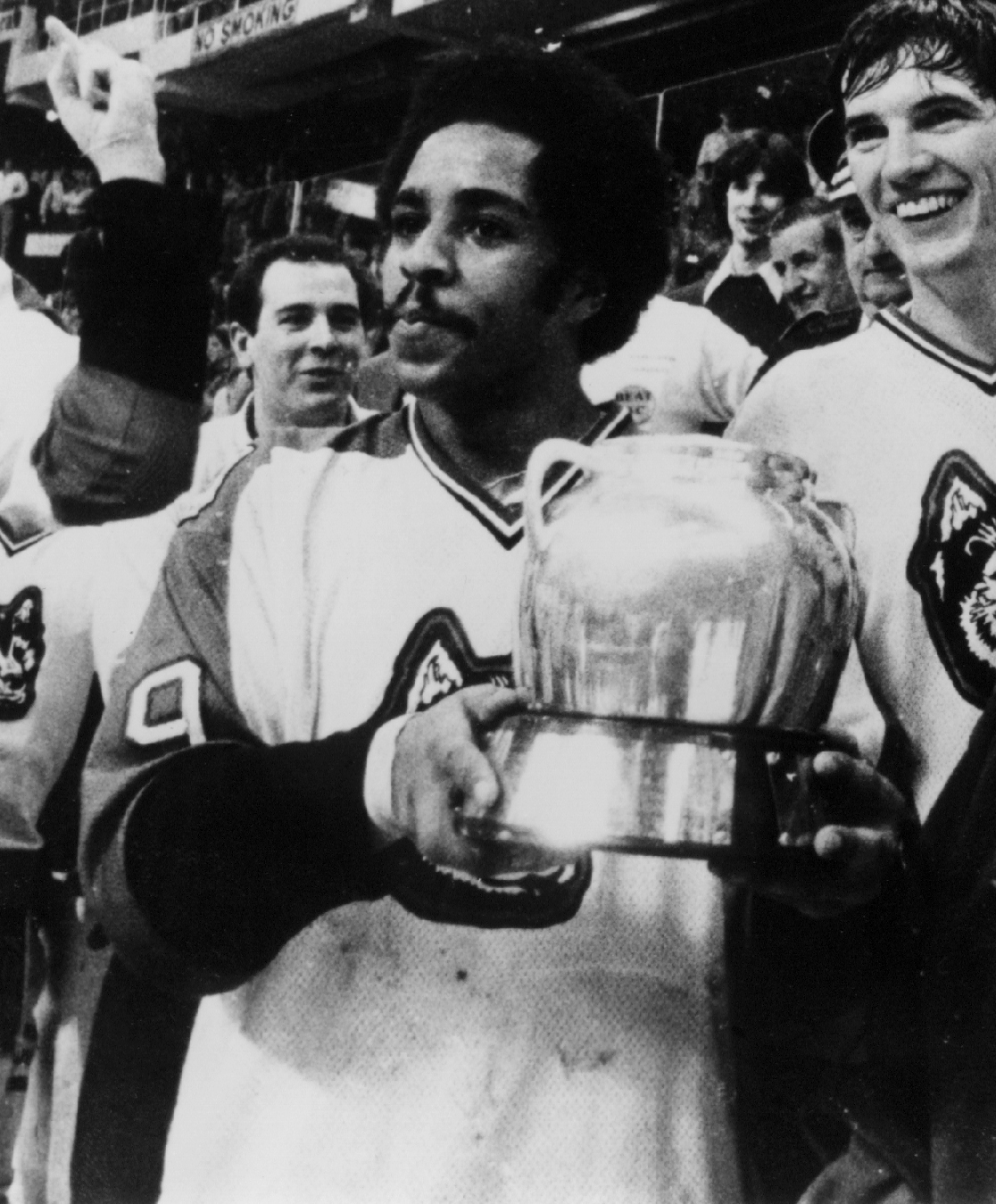
Wayne Turner and David Archambault with 1980 Beanpot

Northeastern, the only Beanpot team that has never won an NCAA hockey title, failed to win a Beanpot until 1980, when an overtime goal by Wayne Turner against Boston College gave the Huskies a win. Turner's wrist shot has often been called the most important goal in Northeastern history, and is generally considered a marquee sporting moment for the university. It is also known as the "Shot Heard Round the Beanpot".

Northeastern won three more titles in the 1980s, but failed to capture the Men's Beanpot for 30 years. The Huskies came close to winning their fifth title in 2005 when they rallied from a 2–0 goal deficit to tie BU, but fell in overtime when Chris Bourque scored the winning goal. They made it to championship game four times from 2011 to 2015 but fell each time, to Boston College in '11, '13, and '14 and to Boston University in '15.

Northeastern won their drought-breaking championship in 2018 with a dominating 5–2 victory over BU. The Huskies were the strongest team in the field, coming into the tournament ranked highest in the pairwise over the other three Beanpot schools. This would be the case again in 2019, where Northeastern again won the championship with a 4–2 victory over BC. In 2020, the Huskies would win their third straight championship against BU in double overtime, solidifying their legacy as a 21st-century Beanpot dynasty and effectively ending their reputation as the underdogs of the tournament. Before 2018, the Huskies had been to only 17 title games, and won only 4 of those. Earning three championships in a row from 2018 to 2020 proved their newfound parity with their other Beanpot schools, where they hoped to continue their success in the coming years. In 2022, Northeastern lost their three-year streak to BU 1–0 after a long standoff BU scored the game winner with less than 5 mins remaining in the 3rd period. In 2023, 16th-ranked Northeastern recaptured the Beanpot title by beating 9th-ranked Harvard 3–2 in the tournament's first ever shootout, after overtime rules were amended that season. In 2024, unranked Northeastern refaced #2 ranked BU, once again winning the Beanpot in a 4–3 overtime match. The title was the Huskies' 5th in a span of 6 straight tournament championship game appearances.

=== Recent tournaments ===
This section explains in detail the results of the previous five Beanpot tournaments as of February 2026.

==== 2017 ====
The 2017 Beanpot took place on February 6 and 13. The first round of the tournament saw Harvard defeat Northeastern 4–3 and Boston University defeat Boston College 3–1. Northeastern defeated Boston College 4–2 in the consolation game and Harvard and BU competed for the Championship, with the Crimson winning their 11th title and first since 1993 by a score of 6–3. This was BU's third consecutive title game and Harvard's first since 2008. Boston College's loss to Northeastern placed them 4th for the first time since 1993 and was only their seventh 4th-place finish in tournament history. Harvard's victory also marked the first non-BC or BU title since Harvard's 1993 victory, a 24- year span.

==== 2018 ====
The 2018 Beanpot took place on February 5 and 12. The first round of the tournament saw Northeastern shutout Boston College 3–0 and BU defeat Harvard in double overtime, 3–2. Harvard defeated Boston College 5–4 in overtime of the consolation game and Northeastern met Boston University in the championship, with the Huskies ending their 30-year drought, winning their 5th title and first since 1988, by a score of 5–2. This was BU's fourth consecutive title game and Northeastern's first since going to three straight between 2013 and 2015. BC's loss to Harvard placed them 4th for the second consecutive year, an occurrence that only happened once before in tournament history between 1974 and 1975. The Huskies' victory also marked a championship for each tournament school in consecutive years - BU in 2015, BC in 2016, Harvard in 2017, and Northeastern in 2018 - an occurrence that happened only once before between 1980 and 1983.

==== 2019 ====
The 2019 Beanpot took place on February 4 and 11. The first round of the tournament saw Boston College defeat Harvard 2–1 and Northeastern defeat Boston University 2–1 in overtime. Harvard defeated Boston University 5–2 in the consolation game, and Northeastern defeated Boston College 4–2 in the Championship for their second straight title and 6th overall. This was the second time Northeastern has won back-to-back titles, the first time being in 1984–85. Boston College made their 36th appearance in the Championship, but failed to capture their 21st title. Boston University finished 4th for just the 7th time in tournament history, with 4 of these having come in the last decade (2011, '13, '14 & '19). Their previous 3 last-place finishes occurred in 1961, '63 & '80. Combined with Harvard's victory in 2017, this also marked the first time in tournament history that three straight tournaments were not won by BU or BC. Two straight seasons without a BU or BC title occurred three times, in '80-'81, '84-'85, and '88-'89.

==== 2020 ====
The 2020 Beanpot took place on February 3 and 10. The first round of the tournament saw Northeastern defeat Harvard 3–1 and Boston University defeat Boston College 5–4 in double overtime.^{*} Boston College defeated Harvard 7–2 in the consolation game, and Northeastern defeated Boston University 5–4 in double overtime^{*} of the Championship for their third straight title and 7th overall. This was the first time in tournament history Northeastern won three straight titles. Boston University made their 54th title appearance, but failed to capture their 31st title. This year's result ties the second-longest title drought for BU, having not won since 2015. They previously had a 5-year drought between 2010 and 2014 – when BC won five straight championships – however, their 7-year span during 1959-65 is the most years in a row the Terriers went without the Beanpot title.

New NCAA rules put in place in 2020 meant all tournament games would have a new overtime format, in which a single 5-minute period would be played and then, if still scoreless, continual overtime with 20-minute periods would be played to determine tournament placement. If no score is reached before the 5-minute period ends, the game is considered a tie and all statistics recorded in the additional overtime periods are not counted. This was put in place to standardize tournament results (across the NCAA, not just the Beanpot) for use with the PairWise ranking system, which at the time determined NCAA tournament seeding.

==== 2023 ====
The 70th annual Beanpot final featured the first-ever meeting between Northeastern and Harvard, with Northeastern winning 3–2 in a shootout. The previous 69 iterations of the championship game featured either one of or both Boston College or Boston University. It was also the first game as well as title match decided by a shootout in the tournament's history.

==== 2026 ====
The 2026 Beanpot final featured the 24th championship contest between Boston College and Boston University, as the schools' 300th all-time meeting, in a repeat matchup of the 2025 title game. The Eagles secured the win, 6–2, earning their first championship since 2016. The game's ceremonial puck-drop was conducted by a pair of Hockey Hall of Fame members and legendary head coaches for their respective schools, Jerry York and Jack Parker.

== Women's Beanpot ==
Starting in 1979, the Women's Beanpot takes place each year on the first two Tuesdays in February. The first tournament was hosted at Northeastern's Matthews Arena, where the Huskies won 3–1 against Boston College. Northeastern and Harvard have won the majority of tournaments, with 19 and 15 titles, respectively. Boston College follows with 8 championships, then Boston University with 2 and Brown with 1. The Northeastern Huskies are the most recent champions, defeating BU 2–1 in the 2024 tournament. The four competing schools rotate hosting the women's games.

=== Northeastern ===
The Northeastern Huskies have the most Women's Beanpot wins out of the four teams with 20, as of 2026. Out of the first 13 tournaments, they took home 10 championships, with an eight-win streak from 1984 to 1991. In recent years, the Huskies have won in 2023, with a 2–1 win against BC, in January 2024, where they defeated Boston University 2–1, and again in 2025, with a 4–0 win against BU.

=== Harvard ===
Harvard won their first Women's Beanpot title at the 4th tournament in 1982, defeating BU 2–1. From the first tournament in 1979 to 1993, Harvard advanced to the championship game 11 out of 15 times and won 4. Since the women's tournament started, 18 of the 43 championship games have been between Harvard and Northeastern. Of those, Harvard has won 7 and Northeastern has won 11. Harvard's most recent win was in 2026, their first time since 2022 when they defeated Boston College 5–4, and bringing their win total to 16.

=== Boston College ===
Boston College's first two women's championships did not come until the 2006 and 2007 Beanpots, winning back-to-back years against Harvard and BU, respectively. Since 2007, the BC Eagles have advanced to the championship round in 8 tournaments and won 6 more titles. BC has won the Beanpot 8 total times, with their most recent win coming in 2018.

=== Boston University ===
BU Terriers have the fewest wins of the usual women's Beanpot teams at 2. Their first title came in 1981 against BC, and their second nearly four decades later in 2019 against Harvard. With their first win, BU defeated BC 4–0, winning the Beanpot while still playing as a club team. Their 3–2 overtime win against Harvard in 2019 marked their first tournament win playing as a varsity team.

=== Brown ===
Brown University competed in and won their only Women's Beanpot in 1993, replacing Boston University, who dropped out for financial reasons. Brown defeated Northeastern in the championship game, winning 3–0.

== Other Beanpots ==
The success of the men's ice hockey tournament has spawned "Beanpot" tournaments in other sports, including basketball, for 14 years, ending in 1976; women's ice hockey; baseball, with the University of Massachusetts Amherst replacing Boston University, which dropped baseball in the 1990s; softball with the University of Massachusetts Amherst replacing Northeastern which doesn't sponsor softball, men's and women's soccer; women's rowing, which also features MIT; and cycling.

The final round of the baseball Beanpot is played at Fenway Park.

A Beanpot for women's rowing was established in 2007, with the crews from Boston College, Boston University, Harvard University (Radcliffe), the Massachusetts Institute of Technology, and Northeastern University competing.

The first Men's Lacrosse Beanpot was held October 19, 2008 at Harvard University. Harvard's Men's Club Team hosted Boston University, Boston College and Northeastern University.

There are also many non-athletic events attached to the Beanpot. These typically occur the same time of year as the hockey beanpot. There is a Concert Band Beanpot, Pep Band Beanpot, Beanpot of Comedy, and a Rice and Beanpot burrito-eating contest, sponsored by Qdoba. The Concert Band Beanpot and Beanpot of Comedy are non-competitive events.

Also, there is the B-School Beanpot Competition, an annual case analysis competition held at Boston University's School of Management since 1996. Undergraduate business schools from the Greater Boston area participate for cash prizes.

The Concert Band Beanpot and Rice and Beanpot participants are the same schools as the men's hockey tournament. The Beanpot of Comedy, hosted by NU & Improv'd of Northeastern University, features sketch and improvisational comedy groups from different schools each year. Past participants have included Boston College, Boston University, Salem State College, Suffolk University, Clark University, and Tufts University. The Business Beanpot participants are Babson College, Boston University, Bentley College, Northeastern University, and Suffolk University. Northeastern University has won ten of the twelve Business Beanpots since 1996, and has taken the top two spots four times. The most recent 1–2 sweep for Northeastern was in 2008.

The Boston College Office of Undergraduate Admission and the Boston University Office of Undergraduate Admission also play in the annual Beancan softball tournament, usually held in July.

On September 26, 2014, the BBC reported that Boston mayor Marty Walsh announced publicly during an official visit to Belfast (Boston's sister city since 2014) that he was supporting a bid to hold a future Beanpot tournament at Odyssey Arena in Belfast and that Walsh reportedly will be hosting a delegation from Belfast alongside representatives from the NCAA and the four beanpot schools in October 2014 to further discuss the possibility. However, after a large negative outcry from the Boston media, Walsh later stated that the idea of moving the tournament to a non-Boston venue was taken out of context, and that he only supported "the hosting of a 'Beanpot-like' tournament in Belfast that would feature Massachusetts colleges."

== All-time results ==
Four games are listed for each Beanpot, in the order they were played. There are two opening round games, a consolation game featuring the losers of the first two games, and a championship game featuring the winners of the first two games. The teams rotate opening round opponents on a 3-year cycle, so over history every team faces the others an equal number of times during the opening round. Each row represents one Beanpot. Champions are listed in bold. Games requiring one overtime, or ending in a tie or shootout are in pink , while games requiring two or three overtimes are in chartreuse and cyan , respectively.

=== Men's ===
==== Results ====
Edition	Year	Arena	Date	Attend.	First Game	Second Game	Date	Attend.	Consolation	Final
1st	1952	Boston Arena	Fri, Dec 26	5,105	Boston University 4 Northeastern 1	Harvard 3 Boston College 2 (OT)	Sat, Dec 27	3,382	Boston College 2 Northeastern 0	**Harvard** 7 (1, 1–0); Boston University 4 (1, 0–1)
2nd	1954	Boston Garden	Mon, Jan 11	711	Harvard 3 Boston University 2	Boston College 8 Northeastern 5	Tue, Jan 12	2,399	Boston University 5 Northeastern 3	**Boston College** 4 (1, 1–0); Harvard 1 (2, 1-1)
3rd	1955	Boston Garden	Mon, Feb 7	2,560	Harvard 12; Northeastern 3	Boston College 9 Boston University 5	Tue, Feb 8	5,654	Boston University 4 Northeastern 3	**Harvard** 5 (3, 2–1); Boston College 4 (2, 1-1) (OT)
4th	1956	Boston Garden	Mon, Feb 6	2,500	Boston College 7 Northeastern 1	Harvard 6 Boston University 1	Wed, Feb 8	4,000	Boston University 9 Northeastern 3	**Boston College** 4 (3, 2–1); Harvard 2 (4, 2-2)
5th	1957	Boston Garden	Fri, Feb 1	4,038	Boston College 6 Northeastern 0	Boston University 5 Harvard 3	Tue, Feb 5	4,038	Harvard 5 Northeastern 3	**Boston College** 5 (4, 3–1); Boston University 4 (2, 0–2) (OT)
6th	1958	Boston Garden	Mon, Feb 3	6,117	Northeastern 5 Harvard 4	Boston University 5 Boston College 4	Mon, Feb 10	4,784	Harvard 7 Boston College 1	**Boston University** 9 (3, 1–2); Northeastern 3 (1, 0–1)
7th	1959	Boston Garden	Mon, Feb 2	5,920	Boston College 6 Harvard 4	Boston University 7 Northeastern 4	Mon, Feb 9	8,180	Harvard 4 Northeastern 0	**Boston College** 7 (5, 4–1); Boston University 4 (4, 1–3)
8th	1960	Boston Garden	Mon, Feb 8	10,909	Harvard 5 Northeastern 3	Boston University 5 Boston College 2	Mon, Feb 15	5,713	Northeastern 6 Boston College 5	**Harvard** 3 (5, 3–2); Boston University 2 (5, 1–4)
9th	1961	Boston Garden	Mon, Feb 6	5,800	Boston College 15; Northeastern 1	Harvard 3 Boston University 2 (OT)	Mon, Feb 13	13,909	Northeastern 6 Boston University 2	**Boston College** 4 (6, 5–1); Harvard 2 (6, 3-3)
10th	1962	Boston Garden	Mon, Feb 5	13,909	Boston University 5 Northeastern 4	Harvard 6 Boston College 1	Mon, Feb 12	4,500	Boston College 4 Northeastern 0	**Harvard** 5 (7, 4–3); Boston University 0 (6, 1–5)
11th	1963	Boston Garden	Mon, Feb 4	6,961	Boston College 2 Boston University 1 (OT)	Harvard 4 Northeastern 3 (OT)	Mon, Feb 11	13,909	Northeastern 4 Boston University 2	**Boston College** 3 (7, 6–1); Harvard 1 (8, 4-4)
12th	1964	Boston Garden	Mon, Feb 3	8,396	Boston College 7 Northeastern 4	Boston University 3 Harvard 2	Mon, Feb 10	13,909	Harvard 7 Northeastern 5	**Boston College** 6 (8, 7–1); Boston University 5 (7, 1–6)
13th	1965	Boston Garden	Mon, Feb 8	13,058	Boston University 5 Northeastern 4 (3OT)	Boston College 5 Harvard 4 (OT)	Mon, Feb 15	13,909	Northeastern 3 Harvard 1	**Boston College** 5 (9, 8–1); Boston University 4 (8, 1–7)
14th	1966	Boston Garden	Mon, Feb 7	13,909	Harvard 5 Northeastern 1	Boston University 6 Boston College 4	Mon, Feb 14	13,909	Boston College 5 Northeastern 3	**Boston University** 9 (9, 2–7); Harvard 2 (9, 4–5)
15th	1967	Boston Garden	Thu, Feb 9	12,261	Northeastern 6 Boston College 5 (OT)	Boston University 8 Harvard 3	Mon, Feb 13	12,910	Boston College 6 Harvard 5	**Boston University** 4 (10, 3–7); Northeastern 0 (2, 0–2)
16th	1968	Boston Garden	Mon, Feb 5	11,818	Boston University 7 Northeastern 4	Harvard 6 Boston College 4	Mon, Feb 12	12,674	Boston College 6 Northeastern 4	**Boston University** 4 (11, 4–7); Harvard 1 (10, 4–6)
17th	1969	Boston Garden	Mon, Feb 3	14,659	Harvard 8 Northeastern 4	Boston University 4 Boston College 2	Mon, Feb 10	9,236	Boston College 6 Northeastern 3	**Harvard** 5 (11, 5–6); Boston University 3 (12, 4–8)
18th	1970	Boston Garden	Mon, Feb 2	14,835	Boston College 5 Northeastern 0	Boston University 5 Harvard 3	Mon, Feb 9	14,702	Harvard 5 Northeastern 4 (OT)	**Boston University** 5 (13, 5–8); Boston College 4 (10, 8–2)
19th	1971	Boston Garden	Mon, Feb 8	11,449	Boston University 12; Northeastern 2	Harvard 10; Boston College 4	Mon, Feb 22	14,994	Boston College 8 Northeastern 2	**Boston University** 4 (14, 6–8); Harvard 1 (12, 5–7)
20th	1972	Boston Garden	Mon, Feb 7	8,159	Harvard 8 Northeastern 3	Boston University 4 Boston College 2	Mon, Feb 14	14,995	Boston College 5 Northeastern 4	**Boston University** 4 (15, 7–8); Harvard 1 (13, 5–8)
21st	1973	Boston Garden	Mon, Feb 5	13,643	Boston College 9 Northeastern 8 (OT)	Boston University 8 Harvard 3	Mon, Feb 12	15,003	Harvard 8 Northeastern 5	**Boston University** 4 (16, 8-8); Boston College 1 (11, 8–3)
22nd	1974	Boston Garden	Mon, Feb 4	8,033	Boston University 6 Northeastern 1	Harvard 11; Boston College 6	Mon, Feb 11	12,202	Northeastern 4 Boston College 3	**Harvard** 5 (14, 6–8); Boston University 4 (17, 8–9)
23rd	1975	Boston Garden	Mon, Feb 3	8,694	Harvard 9 Northeastern 0	Boston University 5 Boston College 3	Mon, Feb 10	15,003	Northeastern 5 Boston College 3	**Boston University** 7 (18, 9-9); Harvard 2 (15, 6–9)
24th	1976	Boston Garden	Mon, Feb 2	11,118	Boston College 5 Northeastern 3	Boston University 6 Harvard 5	Mon, Feb 9	12,250	Harvard 4 Northeastern 2	**Boston College** 6 (12, 9–3); Boston University 3 (19, 9–10)
25th	1977	Boston Garden	Mon, Feb 7	13,674	Boston University 10; Northeastern 5	Harvard 4 Boston College 2	Mon, Feb 14	14,597	Boston College 6 Northeastern 4	**Harvard** 4 (16, 7–9); Boston University 3 (20, 9–11)
26th	1978	Boston Garden	Mon, Feb 6	11,666	Harvard 4 Northeastern 3 (OT)	Boston University 12; Boston College 5	Wed, Mar 1	14,335	Boston College 3 Northeastern 2 (OT)	**Boston University** 7 (21, 10–11); Harvard 1 (17, 7–10)
27th	1979	Boston Garden	Mon, Feb 5	14,679	Boston College 7 Northeastern 2	Boston University 4 Harvard 2	Mon, Feb 12	14,456	Northeastern 5 Harvard 4	**Boston University** 4 (22, 11-11); Boston College 3 (13, 9–4)
28th	1980	Boston Garden	Mon, Feb 4	14,456	Northeastern 6 Boston University 5 (OT)	Boston College 4 Harvard 3	Mon, Feb 11	14,456	Harvard 7 Boston University 4	**Northeastern** 5 (3, 1–2); Boston College 4 (14, 9–5) (OT)
29th	1981	Boston Garden	Mon, Feb 2	14,456	Harvard 10; Northeastern 2	Boston College 5 Boston University 2	Mon, Feb 9	14,456	Boston University 9 Northeastern 2	**Harvard** 2 (18, 8–10); Boston College 0 (15, 9–6)
30th	1982	Boston Garden	Mon, Feb 1	14,673	Boston University 5 Harvard 1	Boston College 3 Northeastern 2 (OT)	Mon, Feb 8	14,673	Northeastern 6 Harvard 5 (OT)	**Boston University** 3 (23, 12–11); Boston College 1 (16, 9–7)
31st	1983	Boston Garden	Tue, Feb 8	14,523	Boston College 5 Harvard 4 (OT)	Northeastern 4 Boston University 3	Mon, Feb 14	14,523	Boston University 5 Harvard 4	**Boston College** 8 (17, 10–7); Northeastern 2 (4, 1–3)
32nd	1984	Boston Garden	Mon, Feb 6	14,451	Northeastern 7 Harvard 3	Boston University 6 Boston College 5	Mon, Feb 13	14,451	Boston College 5 Harvard 2	**Northeastern** 5 (5, 2–3); Boston University 2 (24, 12-12)
33rd	1985	Boston Garden	Mon, Feb 4	14,451	Boston University 5 Harvard 3	Northeastern 4 Boston College 2	Mon, Feb 11	14,451	Harvard 6 Boston College 5	**Northeastern** 4 (6, 3-3); Boston University 2 (25, 12–13)
34th	1986	Boston Garden	Mon, Feb 3	14,451	Boston University 8 Northeastern 5	Boston College 4 Harvard 2	Mon, Feb 10	14,451	Harvard 7 Northeastern 1	**Boston University** 4 (26, 13-13); Boston College 1 (18, 10–8)
35th	1987	Boston Garden	Mon, Feb 2	14,451	Boston University 6 Boston College 3	Northeastern 5 Harvard 4 (OT)	Mon, Feb 9	14,451	Boston College 7 Harvard 6 (OT)	**Boston University** 4 (27, 14–13); Northeastern 3 (7, 3–4) (OT)
36th	1988	Boston Garden	Mon, Feb 1	14,451	Northeastern 4 Boston College 0	Boston University 6 Harvard 4	Mon, Feb 8	14,451	Boston College 4 Harvard 2	**Northeastern** 6 (8, 4-4); Boston University 3 (28, 14-14)
37th	1989	Boston Garden	Mon, Feb 6	14,448	Harvard 5 Boston College 4	Boston University 5 Northeastern 4 (OT)	Mon, Feb 13	14,448	Boston College 4 Northeastern 1	**Harvard** 9 (19, 9–10); Boston University 6 (29, 14–15)
38th	1990	Boston Garden	Mon, Feb 5	14,448	Boston University 4 Boston College 3	Harvard 5 Northeastern 4	Mon, Feb 12	14,448	Boston College 8 Northeastern 4	**Boston University** 8 (30, 15-15); Harvard 2 (20, 9–11)
39th	1991	Boston Garden	Mon, Feb 4	14,448	Boston College 5 Northeastern 3	Boston University 8 Harvard 2	Mon, Feb 11	14,448	Northeastern 5 Harvard 0	**Boston University** 8 (31, 16–15); Boston College 4 (19, 10–9)
40th	1992	Boston Garden	Mon, Feb 3	14,448	Harvard 6 Boston College 4	Boston University 5 Northeastern 4	Mon, Feb 10	14,448	Boston College 5 Northeastern 3	**Boston University** 5 (32, 17–15); Harvard 2 (21, 9–12)
41st	1993	Boston Garden	Mon, Feb 1	14,448	Harvard 7 Northeastern 5	Boston University 8 Boston College 2	Mon, Feb 8	14,448	Northeastern 4 Boston College 3	**Harvard** 4 (22, 10–12); Boston University 2 (33, 17–16)
42nd	1994	Boston Garden	Mon, Feb 7	14,448	Boston College 5 Northeastern 4 (2OT)	Harvard 4 Boston University 2	Mon, Feb 14	14,448	Boston University 8 Northeastern 0	**Boston College** 2 (20, 11–9); Harvard 1 (23, 10–13) (OT)
43rd	1995	Boston Garden	Mon, Feb 6	14,448	Boston University 6 Northeastern 2	Boston College 7 Harvard 6	Mon, Feb 13	14,448	Northeastern 4 Harvard 2	**Boston University** 5 (34, 18–16); Boston College 1 (21, 11–10)
44th	1996	FleetCenter	Mon, Feb 5	17,565	Northeastern 4 Harvard 1	Boston University 4 Boston College 1	Mon, Feb 12	17,565	Boston College 6 Harvard 2	**Boston University** 11 (35, 19–16); Northeastern 4 (9, 4–5)
45th	1997	FleetCenter	Mon, Feb 3	17,565	Boston College 4 Northeastern 1	Boston University 7 Harvard 1	Mon, Feb 10	17,565	Northeastern 2 Harvard 0	**Boston University** 4 (36, 20–16); Boston College 2 (22, 11-11)
46th	1998	FleetCenter	Mon, Feb 2	17,565	Harvard 5 Boston College 4 (OT)	Boston University 4 Northeastern 1	Mon, Feb 9	17,565	Boston College 4 Northeastern 1	**Boston University** 2 (37, 21–16); Harvard 1 (24, 10–14) (OT)
47th	1999	FleetCenter	Mon, Feb 1	17,565	Northeastern 4 Harvard 3 (OT)	Boston University 3 Boston College 2 (OT)	Mon, Feb 8	17,565	Boston College 6 Harvard 4	**Boston University** 4 (38, 22–16); Northeastern 2 (10, 4–6)
48th	2000	FleetCenter	Mon, Feb 7	17,565	Boston College 6 Northeastern 0	Boston University 4 Harvard 0	Mon, Feb 14	17,278	Harvard 3 Northeastern 1	**Boston University** 4 (39, 23–16); Boston College 1 (23, 11–12)
49th	2001	FleetCenter	Mon, Feb 5	17,565	Boston College 4 Harvard 1	Boston University 6 Northeastern 4	Mon, Feb 12	17,278	Northeastern 8 Harvard 7	**Boston College** 5 (24, 12-12); Boston University 3 (40, 23–17)
50th	2002	FleetCenter	Mon, Feb 4	17,565	Northeastern 5 Harvard 2	Boston University 5 Boston College 3	Mon, Feb 11	17,565	Boston College 4 Harvard 0	**Boston University** 5 (41, 24–17); Northeastern 3 (11, 4–7)
51st	2003	FleetCenter	Mon, Feb 3	17,565	Boston University 2 Harvard 1	Boston College 5 Northeastern 2	Mon, Feb 10	17,565	Harvard 4 Northeastern 1	**Boston University** 3 (42, 25–17); Boston College 2 (25, 12–13)
52nd	2004	FleetCenter	Mon, Feb 2	17,565	Boston University 5 Northeastern 2	Boston College 4 Harvard 1	Mon, Feb 9	17,565	Northeastern 3 Harvard 1	**Boston College** 2 (26, 13-13); Boston University 1 (43, 25–18) (OT)
53rd	2005	YourGarden^{†}	Mon, Feb 7	17,565	Northeastern 2 Harvard 1 (2OT)	Boston University 3 Boston College 1	Mon, Feb 14	17,565	Boston College 4 Harvard 1	**Boston University** 3 (44, 26–18); Northeastern 2 (12, 4–8) (OT)
54th	2006	TD Banknorth Garden	Mon, Feb 6	17,565	Boston College 5 Northeastern 2	Boston University 5 Harvard 3	Mon, Feb 13	17,565	Harvard 5 Northeastern 0	**Boston University** 3 (45, 27–18); Boston College 2 (27, 13–14)
55th	2007	TD Banknorth Garden	Mon, Feb 5	17,565	Boston University 4 Northeastern 0	Boston College 3 Harvard 1	Mon, Feb 12	17,565	Northeastern 3 Harvard 1	**Boston University** 2 (46, 28–18); Boston College 1 (28, 13–15) (OT)
56th	2008	TD Banknorth Garden	Mon, Feb 4	17,565	Harvard 3 Northeastern 1	Boston College 4 Boston University 3 (OT)	Mon, Feb 11	17,565	Boston University 5 Northeastern 4	**Boston College** 6 (29, 14–15); Harvard 5 (25, 10–15) (OT)
57th	2009	TD Banknorth Garden	Mon, Feb 2	17,565	Boston University 4 Harvard 3	Northeastern 6 Boston College 1	Mon, Feb 9	17,565	Boston College 4 Harvard 3	**Boston University** 5 (47, 29–18); Northeastern 2 (13, 4–9)
58th	2010	TD Garden	Mon, Feb 1	17,565	Boston College 6 Harvard 0	Boston University 2 Northeastern 1	Mon, Feb 8	17,565	Northeastern 4 Harvard 1	**Boston College** 4 (30, 15-15); Boston University 3 (48, 29–19)
59th	2011	TD Garden	Mon, Feb 7	17,565	Northeastern 4 Harvard 0	Boston College 3 Boston University 2 (OT)	Mon, Feb 14	17,565	Harvard 5 Boston University 4	**Boston College** 7 (31, 16–15); Northeastern 6 (14, 4–10) (OT)
60th	2012	TD Garden	Mon, Feb 6	17,565	Boston University 3 Harvard 1	Boston College 7 Northeastern 1	Mon, Feb 13	17,565	Harvard 3 Northeastern 2	**Boston College** 3 (32, 17–15); Boston University 2 (49, 29–20) (OT)
61st	2013	TD Garden	Mon, Feb 4	17,565	Northeastern 3 Boston University 2	Boston College 4 Harvard 1	Mon, Feb 11	17,565	Harvard 7 Boston University 4	**Boston College** 6 (33, 18–15); Northeastern 3 (15, 4–11)
62nd	2014	TD Garden	Mon, Feb 3	14,776	Northeastern 6 Harvard 0	Boston College 3 Boston University 1	Mon, Feb 10	17,565	Harvard 6 Boston University 2	**Boston College** 4 (34, 19–15); Northeastern 1 (16, 4–12)
63rd	2015	TD Garden	Tue, Feb 3	14,520	Boston University 4 Harvard 3 (2OT)	Northeastern 3 Boston College 2	Mon, Feb 23	14,523	Boston College 3 Harvard 2 (OT)	**Boston University** 4 (50, 30–20); Northeastern 3 (17, 4–13) (OT)
64th	2016	TD Garden	Mon, Feb 1	14,832	Boston College 3 Harvard 2	Boston University 3 Northeastern 1	Mon, Feb 8	15,702	Northeastern 5 Harvard 1	**Boston College** 1 (35, 20–15); Boston University 0 (51, 30–21) (OT)
65th	2017	TD Garden	Mon, Feb 6	15,299	Harvard 4 Northeastern 3	Boston University 3 Boston College 1	Mon, Feb 13	15,941	Northeastern 4 Boston College 2	**Harvard** 6 (26, 11–15); Boston University 3 (52, 30–22)
66th	2018	TD Garden	Mon, Feb 5	13,567	Northeastern 3 Boston College 0	Boston University 3 Harvard 2 (2OT)	Mon, Feb 12	17,565	Harvard 5 Boston College 4 (OT)	**Northeastern** 5 (18, 5–13); Boston University 2 (53, 30–23)
67th	2019	TD Garden	Mon, Feb 4	12,413	Boston College 2 Harvard 1	Northeastern 2 Boston University 1 (OT)	Mon, Feb 11	15,015	Harvard 5 Boston University 2	**Northeastern** 4 (19, 6–13); Boston College 2 (36, 20–16)
68th	2020	TD Garden	Mon, Feb 3	13,141	Northeastern 3 Harvard 1	Boston University 5 Boston College 4 (2OT)^{‡}	Mon, Feb 10	17,850	Boston College 7 Harvard 2	**Northeastern** 5 (20, 7–13); Boston University 4 (2OT)^{‡} (54, 30–24)
―	2021	Canceled due to the COVID-19 pandemic								
69th	2022	TD Garden	Mon, Feb 7	15,535	Boston University 4 Harvard 3	Northeastern 3 Boston College 1	Mon, Feb 14	17,850	Boston College 3 Harvard 3 (OT)^{‡}	**Boston University** 1 (55, 31–24); Northeastern 0 (21, 7–14)
70th	2023	TD Garden	Mon, Feb 6	18,258	Harvard 4 Boston College 3 (OT)	Northeastern 3 Boston University 1	Mon, Feb 13	18,258	Boston College 4 Boston University 2	**Northeastern** 3 (22, 8–14); Harvard 2 (SO)^{‡} (27, 11–16)
71st	2024	TD Garden	Mon, Feb 5		Northeastern 3 Harvard 2 (OT)	Boston University 4 Boston College 3	Mon, Feb 12		Boston College 5 Harvard 0	**Northeastern** 4 (23, 9–14); Boston University 3 (OT) (56, 31–25)
72nd	2025	TD Garden	Mon, Feb 3		Boston University 7 Harvard 1	Boston College 8 Northeastern 2	Mon, Feb 10	18,258	Harvard 4 Northeastern 3	**Boston University** 4 (57, 32–25); Boston College 1 (37, 20–17)
73rd	2026	TD Garden	Mon, Feb 2		Boston College 5 Harvard 1	Boston University 3 Northeastern 2 (SO)	Mon, Feb 9		Harvard 4 Northeastern 1	**Boston College** 6 (38, 21–17); Boston University 2 (58, 32–26)

† During the 2004–05 season, following Fleet's acquisition by Bank of America and the bank's decision to terminate the naming rights to the arena, there was no permanent naming rights sponsor for that season. It was known as "YourGarden" that year.

‡ Beginning in 2020, NCAA rules determined all Beanpot contests would be officially ruled a tie if games remained scoreless after a five-minute overtime period. In 2023, the tournament instituted the use of a shootout to determine game winners after the 5-minute overtime period. From 2020 to 2022, two games continued play beyond the initial overtime, however statistics were not considered official and only used for tournament placement purposes. One consolation game ended in a tie without continuing beyond the initial overtime.

==== Winning Streaks ====
This is a list of all occasions where a Beanpot team has won at least two consecutive championships between years. The current winning streak, if any, is highlighted in chartreuse . Winning streaks with equal numbers of wins are sorted chronologically, with earlier streaks appearing first.

The longest current championship win streak belongs to Boston University, who won six consecutive Beanpots between 1995 and 2000. As of 2022, Harvard is the only team to never win consecutive titles.

Titles	Team	First Title	Last Title
6	Boston University	1995	2000
5	Boston College	2010	2014
4	Boston University	1970	1973
3	Boston College	1963	1965
3	Boston University	1966	1968
3	Boston University	1990	1992
3	Boston University	2005	2007
3	Northeastern	2018	2020
2	Boston College	1956	1957
2	Boston University	1978	1979
2	Northeastern	1984	1985
2	Boston University	1986	1987
2	Boston University	2002	2003
2	Northeastern	2023	2024

=== Women's ===
==== Results ====
Edition	Year	Arena	Date	Attend.	First Game	Second Game	Date	Attend.	Consolation	Final
1st	1979	Northeastern	March 16, 1979		Boston College 4 Boston University 1	Northeastern 4 Harvard 0	March 17, 1979		Boston University 4 Harvard 1	**Northeastern** 3 Boston College 1
2nd	1980	Alexander H. Bright Hockey Center	February 23, 1980		Northeastern 11 Boston College 0	Harvard 5 Boston University 3	February 24, 1980		Boston University 2 Boston College 1 (OT)	**Northeastern** 7 Harvard 1
3rd	1981	Matthews Arena	February 17, 1981		Boston College 2 Harvard 1	Boston University 4 Northeastern 0	February 20, 1981		Northeastern 8 Harvard 0	**Boston University** 4 Boston College 0
4th	1982	Boston University	February 16, 1982		Harvard 3 Northeastern 2 (5OT)	Boston University 10 Boston College 0	February 19, 1982		Northeastern 7 Boston College 4	**Harvard** 2 Boston University 1
5th	1983	Alexander H. Bright Hockey Center	February 8, 1983		Harvard 12 Boston College 0	Northeastern 11 Boston University 1	February 18, 1983		Boston University 10 Boston College 0	**Harvard** 2 Northeastern 1
6th	1984	Matthews Arena	February 7, 1984		Northeastern 14 Boston College 0	Harvard 10 Boston University 0	February 17, 1984		Boston College 3 Boston University 2	**Northeastern** 7 Harvard 1
7th	1985	Alexander H. Bright Hockey Center	February 5, 1985		Boston College 4 Boston University 0	Northeaster 8 Harvard 2	February 12, 1985		Harvard 8 Boston University 1	**Northeastern** 7 Boston College 0
8th	1986	Matthews Arena	February 5, 1986		Northeastern 6 Boston University 0	Harvard 12 Boston College 1	February 11, 986		Boston University 2 Boston College 0	**Northeastern** 7 Harvard 0
9th	1987	Alexander H. Bright Hockey Center	February 3, 1987		Northeastern 10 Boston College 0	Harvard 10 Boston University 0	February 10, 1987		Boston College 3 Boston University 2	**Northeastern** 7 Harvard 1
10th	1988	Alexander H. Bright Hockey Center	February 2, 1988		Northeastern 2 Boston University 0	Harvard 11 Boston College 0	February 9, 1988		Boston University 3 Boston College 2	**Northeastern** 5 Harvard 1
11th	1989	Matthews Arena	February 7, 1989		Harvard 8 Boston University 0	Northeastern 11 Boston College 0	February 14, 1989			**Northeastern** 9 Harvard 0
12th	1990	Boston College	February 6, 1990		Northeastern 2 Boston University 0	Harvard 10 Boston College 2	February 13, 1990			**Northeastern** 3 Harvard 2
13th	1991	Matthews Arena	February 4, 1991		Harvard 10 Boston University 0	Northeastern 2 Boston College 0	February 12, 1991		Boston College 4 Boston University 1	**Northeastern** 2 Harvard 1
14th	1992	Alexander H. Bright Hockey Center	February 4, 1992		Harvard 5 Boston College 1	Northeastern 4 Boston University 0	February 11, 1992			**Harvard** 3 Northeastern 0
15th	1993	Boston College	February 2, 1993		Northeastern 10 Boston College 1	Brown 2 Harvard 1	February 9, 1993		Boston College 4 Harvard 3 (OT)	**Brown** 3 Northeastern 0
16th	1994	Matthews Arena								
17th	1995	Alexander H. Bright Hockey Center	February 7, 1995		Northeastern 24 Boston University 0	Harvard 3 Boston College 2	February 14, 1995		Boston College 7 Boston University 0	**Harvard** 3 Northeastern 2
18th	1996	Matthews Arena	February 6, 1996		Boston College 9 Boston University 0	Northeastern 4 Harvard 0	February 13, 1996		Harvard 8 Boston University 0	**Northeastern** 4 Boston College 3 (OT)
19th	1997	Boston College	January 27, 1997		Harvard 14 Boston University 0	Northeaster 8 Boston College 1	February 11, 1997		Boston College 9 Boston University 0	**Northeastern** 8 Harvard 1
20th	1998	Alexander H. Bright Hockey Center	February 3, 1998		Northeastern 9 Boston University 0	Harvard 6 Boston College 4	February 10, 1998		Boston College 11 Boston University 3	**Northeastern** 5 Harvard 4
21st	1999	Matthews Arena	February 2, 1999		Boston College 9 Boston University 1	Harvard 7 Northeastern 6 (OT)	February 9, 1999		Northeastern 15 Boston University 1	**Harvard** 9 Boston College 0
22nd	2000	Alexander H. Bright Hockey Center	February 8, 2000		Northeastern 7 Boston College 0	Harvard 7 Boston University 0	February 15, 2000		Boston College 7 Boston University 0	**Harvard** 4 Northeastern 3 (OT)
23rd	2001	Boston College	February 6, 2001		Northeastern 9 Boston University 0	Harvard 8 Boston College 1	February 13, 2001		Boston College 5 Boston University 0	**Harvard** 4 Northeastern 3 (OT)
24th	2002	Matthews Arena	February 6, 2002		Boston College 8 Boston University 0	Harvard 4 Northeastern 3 (OT)	February 12, 2002		Northeastern 8 Boston University 0	**Harvard** 7 Boston College 2
25th	2003	Alexander H. Bright Hockey Center	February 4, 2003		Boston College 3 Northeastern 2	Harvard 7 Boston University 0	February 11, 2003		Northeastern 8 Boston University 0	**Harvard** 7 Boston College 0
26th	2004	Boston College	February 3, 2004		Northeastern 8 Boston University 0	Harvard 4 Boston College 0	February 10, 2004		Boston College 7 Boston University 1	**Harvard** 5 Northeastern 1
27th	2005	Matthews Arena	February 8, 2005		Boston College 9 Boston University 1	Harvard 9 Northeastern 1	February 15, 2005		Northeastern 4 Boston University 0	**Harvard** 6 Boston College 1
28th	2006	Alexander H. Bright Hockey Center	February 7, 2006		Boston College 4 Northeastern 3 (OT)	Harvard 2 Boston University 1 (OT)	February 14, 2006		Boston University 3 Northeastern 1	**Boston College** 2 Harvard 0
29th	2007	Boston College	February 6, 2007		Boston University 4 Northeastern 2	Boston College 4 Harvard 3 (3OT)	February 13, 2007		Harvard 8 Northeastern 0	**Boston College** 6 Boston University 1
30th	2008	Walter Brown Arena	February 5, 2008		Harvard 3, Northeastern 1	Boston University 3 Boston College 1	February 12, 2008		Boston College 2 Northeastern 1	**Harvard** 3 Boston University 1
31st	2009	Matthews Arena	February 3, 2009		Harvard 8 Boston University 0	Boston College 3 Northeastern 1	February 10, 2009		Boston University 2 Northeastern 1	**Boston College** 1 Harvard 0
32nd	2010	Alexander H. Bright Hockey Center	February 2, 2010		Northeastern 4 Boston University 4 (OT) (NU wins SO 2-0)	Harvard 5 Boston College 0	February 9, 2010		Boston University 1 Boston College 1 (OT)	**Harvard** 1 Northeastern 0
33rd	2011	Boston College	February 8, 2011		Harvard 3 Northeastern 3 (OT) (Harvard wins SO 2-1)	Boston College 2 Boston University 1	February 15, 2011		Boston University 3 Northeastern 3 (OT)	**Boston College** 3 Harvard 1
34th	2012	Walter Brown Arena	January 31, 2012		Northeastern 1 Boston College 1 (OT) (NU wins SO 2-0)	Boston University 5 Harvard 2	February , 2012		Boston College 4 Harvard 2	**Northeastern** 4 Boston University 3 (OT)
35th	2013	Matthews Arena	February 5, 2013		Boston College 2 Harvard 1	Northeastern 4 Boston University 1	February 12, 2013		Harvard 3 Boston University 0	**Northeastern** 4 Boston College 3
36th	2014	Boston College	February 4, 2014		Northeastern 4 Harvard 3	Boston College 4 Boston University 1	February 11, 2014		Harvard 3 Boston University 2 (OT)	**Boston College** 3 Northeastern 0
37th	2015	Bright-Landry Hockey Center (formerly Alexander H. Bright Hockey Center)	February 3, 2015		Boston College 3 Northeastern 1	Harvard 9 Boston University 2	February 10, 2015		Boston University 3 Northeastern 1	**Harvard** 3 Boston College 2
38th	2016	Walter Brown Arena	February 2, 2016		Boston College 8 Harvard 0	Northeastern 3 Boston University 2	February 9, 2016		Harvard 5 Boston University 3	**Boston College** 7 Northeastern 0
39th	2017	Matthews Arena	January 31, 2017	1,434	Boston College 3 Boston University 2	Northeastern 4 Harvard 1	February 7, 2017		Harvard 6 Boston University 6	**Boston College** 2 Northeastern 1
40th	2018	Boston College	February 6, 2018		Boston University 3 Harvard 2	Boston College 5 Northeastern 2	February 13, 2018		Harvard 4 Northeastern 3	**Boston College** 4 Boston University 3 (OT)
41st	2019	Bright-Landry Hockey Center	February 5, 2019		Boston University 3 Northeastern 3 (BU wins SO 2-1)	Harvard 4 Boston College 1	February 12, 2019		Boston College 4 Northeastern 1	**Boston University** 3 Harvard 2 (OT)
42nd	2020	Walter Brown Arena	February 4, 2020		Northeastern 3 Harvard 1	Boston University 4 Boston College 0	February 11, 2020		Boston College 3 Harvard 1	Northeastern 4 Boston University 3 (2OT)
―	2021	Cancelled due to the COVID-19 pandemic								
43rd	2022	Matthews Arena	February 1		Harvard 4 Boston University 1		Tue, Feb 8		Northeastern 3 Boston University 0	**Harvard** 5 (30, 15–15); Boston College 4 (19, 8–11)
44th	2023	Conte Forum	February 7		Northeastern 4 Boston University 1		Tue, Feb 14		Boston University 7 Harvard 4	
45th	2024	Bright-Landry Hockey Center/TD Garden	January 16		Boston University 4 Boston College 3 (SO)		Tue, Jan 23	10,633	Harvard 3 Boston College 2 (SO)	**Northeastern** 2 (30, 19–11); Boston University 1 (OT) (9, 2–7)
46th	2025	Matthews Arena/TD Garden	January 14		Boston University 2 Harvard 1 (OT)		Tue, Jan 21	13,279	Boston College 4 Harvard 1	**Northeastern** 4 (31, 20–11); Boston University 0 (10, 2–8)
47th	2026	Walter Brown Arena/TD Garden	January 13	2,281	Harvard 2 Boston College 1		Tue, Jan 20	10,175	Northeastern 3 Boston College 2	**Harvard** 2 (31, 16–15); Boston University 1 (OT)(11, 2–9)

==== Winning Streaks ====
This is a list of all occasions where a Women's Beanpot team has won at least two consecutive championships between years. The current winning streak, if any, is highlighted in chartreuse . Winning streaks with equal numbers of wins are sorted chronologically, with earlier streaks appearing first.

The longest current championship win streak belongs to Northeastern, who won eight consecutive Beanpots between 1984 and 1991. As of 2025, Boston University is the only team to never win consecutive titles.

Titles	Team	First Title	Last Title
8	Northeastern	1984	1991
7	Harvard	1999	2005
3	Northeastern	1996	1998
3	Boston College	2016	2018
3	Northeastern	2023	2025
2	Northeastern	1979	1980
2	Harvard	1982	1983
2	Boston College	2006	2007
2	Northeastern	2012	2013

== Team statistics ==
=== Men's ===
Through the 2026 Beanpot, the four teams have amassed the following statistics:

(The tie in the 2022 Consolation game is considered a 3rd-place finish for both Boston College and Harvard)

Team	W	L	T	Pct.	GF	GA	Beanpot Finishes				Championship Games		
Team	W	L	T	Pct.	GF	GA	1st	2nd	3rd	4th	Total	Goals	Avg.
Boston University	97	49	0	.664	631	459	32	26	7	8	58	227	3.914
Boston College	85	60	1	.586	592	497	21	17	27	8	38	132	3.474
Harvard	59	86	1	.408	513	569	11	16	22	24	27	82	3.037
Northeastern	50	96	0	.342	451	662	9	14	18	32	23	74	3.217

Note: Unofficial statistics from the 2020 tournament are included.

=== Women's ===
Through the 2026 Beanpot, the five teams have amassed the following statistics:

Team	W	L	T	Pct.	GF	GA	Beanpot Finishes				Championship Games		
Team	W	L	T	Pct.	GF	GA	1st	2nd	3rd	4th	Total	Goals	Avg.
Northeastern	57	32	6	.632	415		20	11	9	7	31	110	3.548
Harvard	53	39	3	.574	368		16	15	9	7	31	83	2.677
Boston College	43	44	4	.495	249		8	12	20	7	20	45	2.250
Boston University	20	60	7	.270	149		2	9	15	19	11	21	1.909
Brown	2	0	0	1.000	5	1	1	0	0	0	1	3	3.000

== Individual awards ==
Two awards are presented annually: the Most Valuable Player award and the Eberly Award. The Eberly Award, first presented in 1974, is given annually to the goalie with the best save percentage. The winning goalie must participate in two games to qualify. The award is named after Glen and Dan Eberly, former Beanpot goaltenders at Boston University and Northeastern University, respectively.

Year	Champion	Most Valuable Player			Eberly Award					
Year	Champion	Player	Pos	School	Player	School	Saves	Goals	Save Pct.	GAA
1952	Harvard	Walt Greeley	F	Harvard						
1954	Boston College	Bob Babine	F	Boston College						
1955	Harvard	Billy Cleary	F	Harvard						
1956	Boston College	James Tiernan	F	Boston College						
1957	Boston College	Joe Celeta	F	Boston College						
1958	Boston University	Bill Sullivan	F	Boston University						
1959	Boston College	Jim Logue	G	Boston College						
1960	Harvard	Bob Bland	G	Harvard						
1961	Boston College	Tom Martin	D	Boston College						
1962	Harvard	Gene Kinasewich	F	Harvard						
1963	Boston College	Billy Hogan	F	Boston College						
1964	Boston College	John Cunniff (1)	F	Boston College						
1965	Boston College	John Cunniff (2)	F	Boston College						
1966	Boston University	Tom Ross	D	Boston University						
1967	Boston University	Herb Wakabayashi	F	Boston University						
1968	Boston University	Jim McCann	G	Boston University						
1969	Harvard	Joe Cavanagh	F	Harvard						
1970	Boston University	Mike Hyndman	D	Boston University						
1971	Boston University	Steve Stirling	F	Boston University						
1972	Boston University	Dan Brady; John Danby	G F	Boston University; Boston University						
1973	Boston University	Vic Stanfield (1)	D	Boston University						
1974	Harvard	Randy Roth	F	Harvard	Ed Walsh	Boston University	50	6	0.893	3.00
1975	Boston University	Vic Stanfield (2)	D	Boston University	Brian Durocher	Boston University	54	5	0.915	2.50
1976	Boston College	Paul Skidmore	G	Boston College	Paul Skidmore (1)	Boston College	70	6	0.921	3.00
1977	Harvard	Brian Petrovek	G	Harvard	Brian Petrovek	Harvard	46	5	0.902	2.50
1978	Boston University	Jack O'Callahan	D	Boston University	Ed Arrington	Northeastern	51	7	0.879	3.50
1979	Boston University	Daryl MacLeod	F	Boston University	Paul Skidmore (2)	Boston College	57	6	0.905	3.00
1980	Northeastern	Dave Archambault	D	Northeastern	George Demetroulakas	Northeastern	40	9	0.816	4.50
1981	Harvard	Wade Lau	G	Harvard	Wade Lau	Harvard	36	2	0.947	1.00
1982	Boston University	Tom O'Regan	F	Boston University	Bob O'Connor	Boston College	67	5	0.930	2.50
1983	Boston College	Bob Sweeney	F	Boston College	Bill Switaj	Boston College	58	6	0.906	3.00
1984	Northeastern	Tim Marshall	G	Northeastern	Tim Marshall	Northeastern	54	5	0.915	2.50
1985	Northeastern	Bruce Racine (1)	G	Northeastern	Bruce Racine (1)	Northeastern	63	4	0.940	2.00
1986	Boston University	Terry Taillefer	G	Boston University	Scott Gordon	Boston College	51	6	0.895	3.00
1987	Boston University	Mike Kelfer	F	Boston University	Terry Taillefer	Boston University	70	6	0.921	3.00
1988	Northeastern	Bruce Racine (2)	G	Northeastern	Bruce Racine (2)	Northeastern	50	3	0.943	1.50
1989	Harvard	Lane MacDonald	F	Harvard	Rich Burchill	Northeastern	67	9	0.882	4.50
1990	Boston University	David Tomlinson	F	Boston University	Scott Cashman (1)	Boston University	52	5	0.912	2.50
1991	Boston University	Tony Amonte	F	Boston University	Tom Cole	Northeastern	86	5	0.945	2.50
1992	Boston University	Mike Prendergast	F	Boston University	Scott Cashman (2)	Boston University	59	6	0.908	3.00
1993	Harvard	Ted Drury	F	Harvard	Scott Cashman (3)	Boston University	41	6	0.872	3.00
1994	Boston College	Greg Taylor	G	Boston College	Greg Taylor	Boston College	66	5	0.930	2.11
1995	Boston University	Ken Rausch	F	Boston University	Derek Herlofsky	Boston University	51	3	0.944	1.50
1996	Boston University	Chris Drury	F	Boston University	Tom Noble	Boston University	52	5	0.912	2.64
1997	Boston University	Bill Pierce	F	Boston University	Marc Robitaille (1)	Northeastern	68	4	0.944	2.00
1998	Boston University	Tom Poti	D	Boston University	Marc Robitaille (2)	Northeastern	75	7	0.915	3.51
1999	Boston University	Michel Larocque	G	Boston University	Michel Larocque	Boston University	65	4	0.942	1.92
2000	Boston University	Rick DiPietro	G	Boston University	Rick DiPietro	Boston University	52	1	0.981	0.50
2001	Boston College	Krys Kolanos	F	Boston College	Scott Clemmensen	Boston College	36	4	0.900	2.00
2002	Boston University	Justin Maiser	F	Boston University	Matti Kaltiainen	Boston College	42	4	0.913	2.02
2003	Boston University	Sean Fields (1)	G	Boston University	Sean Fields (1)	Boston University	59	3	0.952	1.50
2004	Boston College	Sean Fields (2)	G	Boston University	Sean Fields (2)	Boston University	85	4	0.955	1.90
2005	Boston University	Chris Bourque	F	Boston University	Keni Gibson	Northeastern	65	4	0.942	1.54
2006	Boston University	Peter MacArthur	F	Boston University	Cory Schneider	Boston College	61	5	0.924	2.53
2007	Boston University	John Curry	G	Boston University	John Curry	Boston University	64	1	0.985	0.48
2008	Boston College	Brian Gibbons	F	Boston College	Brad Thiessen (1)	Northeastern	70	8	0.897	4.06
2009	Boston University	Nick Bonino	F	Boston University	Brad Thiessen (2)	Northeastern	74	6	0.925	3.00
2010	Boston College	John Muse	G	Boston College	John Muse	Boston College	64	3	0.955	1.53
2011	Boston College	Chris Kreider	F	Boston College	Chris Rawlings	Northeastern	80	7	0.920	3.36
2012	Boston College	Johnny Gaudreau	F	Boston College	Kieran Millan	Boston University	73	4	0.948	1.72
2013	Boston College	Kevin Roy	F	Northeastern	Parker Milner	Boston College	39	4	0.907	2.00
2014	Boston College	Kevin Hayes	F	Boston College	Thatcher Demko	Boston College	56	2	0.966	1.00
2015	Boston University	Matt Grzelcyk	D	Boston University	Steve Michalek	Harvard	87	7	0.926	2.93
2016	Boston College	Sean Maguire	G	Boston University	Sean Maguire	Boston University	65	2	0.970	0.98
2017	Harvard	Nathan Krusko	F	Harvard	Jake Oettinger	Boston University	63	7	0.913	3.50
2018	Northeastern	Adam Gaudette	F	Northeastern	Cayden Primeau (1)	Northeastern	75	2	0.974	1.00
2019	Northeastern	Cayden Primeau	G	Northeastern	Cayden Primeau (2)	Northeastern	59	3	0.952	1.49
2020	Northeastern	Zach Solow	F	Northeastern	Craig Pantano	Northeastern	67	5	0.931	2.16
2021	Cancelled due to the COVID-19 pandemic									
2022	Boston University	Dylan Peterson	F	Boston University	TJ Semptimphelter	Northeastern	69	2	0.972	1.01
2023	Northeastern	Devon Levi	G	Northeastern	Devon Levi	Northeastern	65	3	0.956	1.50
2024	Northeastern	Gunnarwolfe Fontaine	F	Northeastern	Cameron Whitehead	Northeastern	54	5	0.915	2.07
2025	Boston University	Cole Hutson	D	Boston University	Mikhail Yegorov	Boston University	69	2	0.972	1.01
2026	Boston College	James Hagens	F	Boston College	Louka Cloutier	Boston College	57	3	0.950	1.50

Note: Unofficial statistics from the 2020 tournament are included.
