= Daniel Holloway (cyclist) =

American cyclist (born 1987)

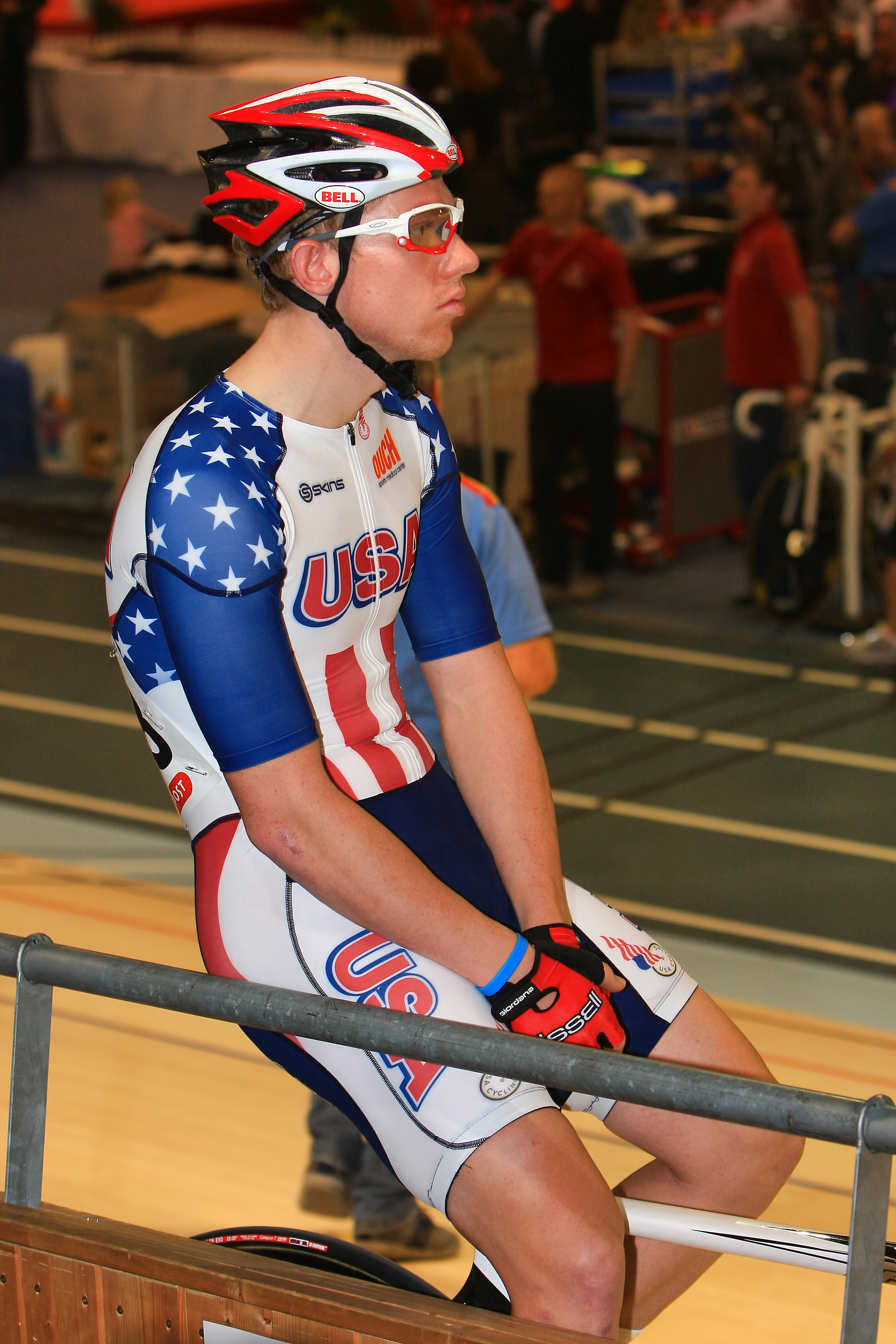
- Holloway in 2010

Personal information
- Full name: Daniel R. Holloway
- Nickname: Hollywood
- Born: May 21, 1987 (age 39) Wichita Falls, Texas

Cycling career
- Sport: Cycling
- Role: Rider

Amateur teams
- 2008: Garmin–Chipotle p/b H30 (stagiaire)
- 2009: Felt–Holowesko Partners
- 2014: Athlete Octane Cycling
- 2015: Alto Velo p/b Seasucker
- 2016: Intelligentsia Coffee
- 2017–2021: Texas Roadhouse Racing

Professional teams
- 2010: Bissell
- 2011: Kelly Benefit Strategies–OptumHealth
- 2012: Team Raleigh–GAC
- 2013: Amore & Vita
Medal record
Representing the United States
Men's track cycling
Pan American Games
Gold medal – first place	2019 Lima	Omnium
Pan American Championships
Gold medal – first place	2018 Aguascalientes	Madison
Silver medal – second place	2019 Cochabamba	Team pursuit
Silver medal – second place	2019 Cochabamba	Madison

Daniel Holloway (born May 21, 1987) is an American cyclist, who previously rode for the U. S. National Team, the professional Garmin Chipotle Team and the American amateur team Texas Roadhouse Racing. Holloway specialized in criteriums, track racing, and six-day racing. During his career, Holloway has won over 20 national titles, a Pan American title in 2018, and a gold medal at the 2019 Pan American Games. On June 2, 2021, Daniel Holloway announced his retirement from professional cycling. On September 3, 2023, Daniel Holloway returned to the men's Pro Peloton at The Gateway Cup to be the first cyclist to ever race, film and narrate with live color commentary.

== Career ==
=== Early life and junior career ===
Holloway was born on May 21, 1987, in Wichita Falls, Texas, and began as a speed skater. He began cycling as practice for speed skating in the summer. His racing career began on the velodrome due to its similarities with the track. Holloway took to cycling winning his first national championship in July 2004 in the Madison. In 2005, he won his next national title at Junior Track Nationals in the individual and team pursuits. In 2007, he took his first Criterium National title as an amateur.

=== Amateur and professional career ===
In 2008, he rode to 4 Elite National titles on the track, winning the team pursuit, madison, points race and the scratch. He joined the Garmin–Chipotle p/b H30 team as a stagiaire, before joining the Felt–Holowesko Partners team for the 2009 season. Holloway won the kilo and points race titles at the National Track Championships, and he also competed at the 2009 UCI Track Cycling World Championships in Poland with teammates Colby Pearce and Taylor Phinney. In 2010 Holloway joined the domestic Bissell team and raced predominately on the road, winning his first United States National Criterium Championships. In 2011, Holloway joined the UCI Continental team Kelly Benefit Strategies–OptumHealth further focusing on road racing with a specialty in criteriums.

Holloway joined Team Raleigh–GAC in 2012, where he again won the scratch at the National Track Championships. He moved to Amore & Vita for the 2013 season, before returning the American domestic scene ahead of the 2014 season. Holloway won a record 21 races in 2014 with Athlete Octane, including his second criterium title at the National Amateur Road Championships. Riding for Alto Velo p/b Seasucker in 2015, Holloway extended his record to 26 victories, and a second consecutive criterium title at the National Amateur Road Championships. In 2016, Holloway took his third consecutive criterium title at the National Amateur Road Championships and also won the road race title for Intelligentsia Coffee. He also raced his first-ever Red Hook Criterium Series, placing 5th at his first attempt at Red Hook Brooklyn.

Holloway moved to Texas Roadhouse Racing for the 2017 season, where he won a second consecutive road race title at the National Amateur Road Championships. Towards the end of his 2017 road season, Holloway shifted focus back to the track, winning 2 National titles (Omnium and Madison) and a World Cup (Omnium) on the track, and three National titles (Omnium, Madison, Points race) as well as the Pan-American Madison Championship title in 2018. In 2019 he won a Pan American Gold medal in the Omnium. In addition to Texas Roadhouse, Daniel Holloway was named an official member of Team USA's track cycling endurance program. He announced his retirement in 2021.

Post-retirement Daniel Holloway began commentating at various cycling events, specializing in criterium color commentary. Together with Gabe Lloyd he launched The Call Up Podcast in 2023 dissecting and analyzing both men and women's Criterium races, focusing mostly on the American Criterium Cup. Shortly after, with 2 years off the bike and only 8 weeks of training, he became the first ever cyclist to race and commentate live from the peloton at Day 3 of the 2023 Gateway Cup.

== Personal life ==
Daniel Holloway is married to creative director, entrepreneur, and owner of Kombucha and brand Mortal Ventures, Becca Schepps. Together they have one son.

== Major victories ==
2005
1st Stage 3 Tour de l'Abitibi
National Junior Track Championships

1st Individual pursuit
1st Team pursuit

2006
1st Overall Tulsa Tough
2007
1st Criterium, National Amateur Road Championships
2008
National Track Championships

1st Team pursuit (with Taylor Phinney, Colby Pearce & Dave Koesel)
1st Madison (with Colby Pearce)
1st Scratch
1st Under-23 points race

Tour of Pennsylvania

1st Stages 1b & 6

2009
Vuelta a Palencia

1st Stages 1 & 6

National Track Championships

1st Points race
1st Kilo

2010
1st Criterium, National Road Championships
1st TD Bank Mayor's Cup
2012
1st Stage 6 Vuelta Mexico Telmex
1st Scratch, National Track Championships
2014
1st Criterium, National Amateur Road Championships
1st Athens Twilight Criterium
2015
1st Criterium, National Amateur Road Championships
1st Overall USA Crits Series

1st Athens Twilight Criterium
1st Tulsa Tough
1st Gateway Cup

2016
National Amateur Road Championships

1st Criterium
1st Road race

1st Tulsa Tough
Red Bull Last Stand

1st Double Down Award
2nd Geared race

2017
1st Road race, National Amateur Road Championships
National Track Championships

1st Team pursuit
1st Madison (with Adrian Hegyvary)
1st Omnium

1st Omnium, 2017–18 UCI Track Cycling World Cup, Santiago
2nd Omnium, UCI C1 Troféu Internacional de Anadia
2nd Omnium, UCI C1 Track Cycling Challenge Switzerland
2018
1st Madison, Pan American Track Championships (with Adrian Hegyvary)
National Track Championships

1st Omnium
1st Madison (with Adrian Hegyvary)
1st Points race

1st Madison, Japan Track Cup I
1st Handicap Madison – Chase, Six Days of Copenhagen
3rd Madison, 2018–19 UCI Track Cycling World Cup, Milton (with Adrian Hegyvary)
2019
1st Madison, National Track Championships (with Adrian Hegyvary)
2nd Madison, Pan American Track Championships (with Adrian Hegyvary)
2nd Madison, Super Tuesday
3rd Madison, 2018–19 UCI Track Cycling World Cup, Cambridge (with Adrian Hegyvary)
3rd Madison, 2018–19 Six Day Series, Hong Kong
