= Tulsa Tough =

Three-day cycling event in Tulsa, Oklahoma

Race details
- Date: June
- Region: Tulsa, Oklahoma
- Discipline: Road
- Competition: National calendar
- Type: Stage race

History
- First edition: 2006
- Editions: 19 (as of 2025)
- First winner: Jason Donald (USA)
- Most wins: Brad Huff (USA); Daniel Holloway (USA); (2 wins)
- Most recent: Daniel Summerhill (USA)

Saint Francis Tulsa Tough Ride and Race is a three-day cycling festival in Tulsa, Oklahoma. It features non-competitive riding through scenic areas around the Tulsa Metropolitan Area and professional level races. It is held each year on Friday, Saturday and Sunday, the second weekend in June.

Saint Francis Tulsa Tough attracts professional and amateur racers from across the country racing criterium style races on three different venues in the streets of Downtown Tulsa and along the Arkansas River. Prize money rivals the largest purses in the nation.

In 2008, Tulsa Tough's women's pro races were selected by USA Cycling to be on the prestigious National Racing Calendar. Based on voting by racers, race officials, and announcers, Tulsa Tough was ranked in the top 10 out of 30 NRC races in only its third year. With this proven success, the men's and women's races were again on the National Racing Calendar for 2009 and after the event were ranked in the top four among all NRC events.

Saint Francis Tulsa Tough offers two days of tour rides with 50 km, 100 km, 200 km, and 100 mi options each day covering nearly 400 miles of Northeast Oklahoma hills and scenery. All routes feature aid stations and rolling support for riders of all sizes and abilities.

Saint Francis Tulsa Tough is jointly promoted by the Tulsa Sports Commission and Tulsa Wheelmen and is supported by corporate sponsorship. Guidance for the event comes from an executive committee made up of several Tulsa-area cyclists and business people.

Cry Baby Hill, the last part of the grueling River Parks Criterium race, serves as the annual finale of the Tulsa Tough race. There, Tulsans line the hill to cheer them on, chug beers and parade around in costumes. Although the event began organically with the help of Team Soundpony, it has grown to become one of the largest parties and social events in the city.

== Winners ==
Year	Course	Men	Women
2006		(United States) Karl Bordine	
2006		(United States) Jason Donald	
2006		(United States) Jason Donald	
2007		(Argentina) Ricardo Escuela	
2007		(United States) Michael Grabinger	
2007		(United States) Brian Jensen	
2008		(Australia) Hilton Clarke	
2008		(Serbia) Ivan Stević	
2008		(Serbia) Ivan Stević	
2009	Blue Dome Criterium	(United States) Brad Huff	Laura Van Gilder
2009	Brady Village Criterium	(United States) Brad Huff	Shelley Olds
2009	Riverview Criterium	(United States) Daniel Ramsey	Shelley Olds
2010		(United States) Charles Bradley Huff	Amanda Miller
2010		(United States) Brad Huff	Coryn Rivera
2010		(United States) Brian Jensen	Cari Higgins
2011	Blue Dome Criterium	(Australia) Jonathan Cantwell	Tiffany Pezzulo
2011	Brady Village Criterium	(United States) Ken Hanson	Jackie Crowell
2011	Riverview Criterium	(Argentina) Alejandro Borrajo	Anne Samplonius
2012	Blue Dome Criterium	(United States) Ken Hanson	Erica Allar
2012	Brady Village Criterium	(Cuba) Luis Amarán	Robin Farina
2012	River Parks Criterium	(United States) Eric Marcotte	Alison Powers
2013	Blue Dome Criterium	(United States) Luke Keough	Theresa Cliff-Ryan
2013	Brady Village Criterium	(United States) Luke Keough	Theresa Cliff-Ryan
2013	River Parks Criterium	(United States) Luke Keough	Alison Powers
2014		(Mexico) Fabrizio Von Nacher	
2015		(United States) Daniel Holloway	
2016		(United States) Daniel Holloway	
2017		(Australia) Scott Law	
2018		(Mexico) Alfredo Rodríguez	
2019		(United States) Sam Bassetti	
2021		(United States) Cory Williams	Skylar Schneider
2022		(United States) Luke Lamperti	
2023		(United States) Daniel Summerhill	Samantha Schneider
2024		(United States) Luke Lamperti	Kendall Gail Ryan
