= 2017 Thüringen Rundfahrt der Frauen =

Race details
- Dates: 12–18 July 2017
- Stages: Prologue + 6 stages
- Distance: 559.8 km (347.8 mi)
- Winning time: 14h 53' 00"

Results
Jersey awarded to the overall winner	Winner	Lisa Brennauer (GER)	(Canyon//SRAM)
	Second	Ellen van Dijk (NED)	(Netherlands (national team))
	Third	Hayley Simmonds (GBR)	(Team WNT)
Jersey awarded to the points classification winner	Points	Eugenia Bujak (POL)	(BTC City Ljubljana)
Jersey awarded to the mountains classification winner	Mountains	Tayler Wiles (USA)	(UnitedHealthcare)
Jersey awarded to the youth classification winner	Youth	Emma White (USA)	(United States (national team))
	Team	Canyon//SRAM	

The 2017 Thüringen Rundfahrt der Frauen (also known as the Internationalen LOTTO Thüringen Ladies Tour for sponsorship reasons) was the 30th edition of the Thüringen Rundfahrt der Frauen, a women's cycling stage race in Germany. It was rated by the UCI as a category 2.1 race and was held between 12 and 18 July 2017.

The race was won by home rider Lisa Brennauer (Canyon//SRAM), who regained the race lead from Team WNT's Hayley Simmonds after the fourth stage individual time trial. Brennauer finished 19 seconds clear of Ellen van Dijk, who was racing for the Netherlands national team, while Simmonds completed the podium, a further 16 seconds behind. Other classification wins were taken by Eugenia Bujak (BTC City Ljubljana; points), Tayler Wiles (UnitedHealthcare; mountains) and Emma White (United States national team; youth), while the teams classification was won by Canyon//SRAM.

== Teams ==
A total of 18 teams took part in the race.

UCI Women's Teams

- Bepink–Cogeas
- Bizkaia–Durango
- BTC City Ljubljana
- Canyon//SRAM
- Drops
- Parkhotel Valkenburg–Destil
- Tibco–Silicon Valley Bank
- UnitedHealthcare
- Team WNT

National teams

- Australia
- Germany
- Netherlands
- Norway
- Poland
- United States

Amateur teams

- d.velop cloud–cycle cafe
- Maxx–Solar
- Storey Racing

== Schedule ==
The race route was announced on 9 May 2017.

List of stages
Stage	Date	Course	Distance	Type	Winner
P	12 July	Gera to Gera	5.9 km (3.7 mi)	Individual time trial	Lisa Brennauer (GER)
1	13 July	Schleiz to Schleiz	124.8 km (77.5 mi)	Hilly stage	Tiffany Cromwell (AUS)
2	14 July	Dörtendorf to Dörtendorf	102.9 km (63.9 mi)	Hilly stage	Lex Albrecht (CAN)
3	15 July	Weimar to Weimar	123.4 km (76.7 mi)	Hilly stage	Hayley Simmonds (GBR)
4	16 July	Schmölln to Schmölln	18.7 km (11.6 mi)	Individual time trial	Lauren Stephens (USA)
5	17 July	Greiz to Greiz	108.3 km (67.3 mi)	Hilly stage	Tayler Wiles (USA)
6	18 July	Gotha to Gotha	75.8 km (47.1 mi)	Hilly stage	Skylar Schneider (USA)
Total			559.8 km (347.8 mi)		

== Stages ==
=== Prologue ===
12 July 2017 — Gera to Gera, 5.9 km (3.7 mi), individual time trial (ITT)

Prologue result & General classification after Prologue
Rank	Rider	Team	Time
1	Lisa Brennauer (GER)	Canyon//SRAM	8' 52"
2	Amy Pieters (NED)	Netherlands (national team)	+ 12"
3	Olga Zabelinskaya (RUS)	Bepink–Cogeas	+ 14"
4	Elizabeth-Jane Harris (GBR)	Storey Racing	+ 15"
5	Ellen van Dijk (NED)	Netherlands (national team)	+ 16"
6	Eugenia Bujak (POL)	BTC City Ljubljana	+ 17"
7	Roxane Knetemann (NED)	Netherlands (national team)	+ 17"
8	Tayler Wiles (USA)	UnitedHealthcare	+ 19"
9	Trixi Worrack (GER)	Canyon//SRAM	+ 20"
10	Mieke Kröger (GER)	Canyon//SRAM	+ 20"

=== Stage 1 ===
13 July 2017 — Schleiz to Schleiz, 124.8 km (77.5 mi)

Stage 1 result
Rank	Rider	Team	Time
1	Tiffany Cromwell (AUS)	Canyon//SRAM	3h 34' 05"
2	Anna Zita Maria Stricker (ITA)	BTC City Ljubljana	+ 3"
3	Amy Pieters (NED)	Netherlands (national team)	+ 3"
4	Katarzyna Pawłowska (POL)	Poland (national team)	+ 3"
5	Ruth Winder (USA)	UnitedHealthcare	+ 3"
6	Gracie Elvin (AUS)	Australia (national team)	+ 3"
7	Eva Buurman (NED)	Parkhotel Valkenburg–Destil	+ 3"
8	Lisa Brennauer (GER)	Canyon//SRAM	+ 3"
9	Liane Lippert (GER)	Germany (national team)	+ 3"
10	Demi de Jong (NED)	Parkhotel Valkenburg–Destil	+ 3"

General classification after Stage 1
Rank	Rider	Team	Time
1	Lisa Brennauer (GER)	Canyon//SRAM	3h 42' 57"
2	Amy Pieters (NED)	Netherlands (national team)	+ 4"
3	Eugenia Bujak (POL)	BTC City Ljubljana	+ 16"
4	Olga Zabelinskaya (RUS)	Bepink–Cogeas	+ 17"
5	Ellen van Dijk (NED)	Netherlands (national team)	+ 19"
6	Roxane Knetemann (NED)	Netherlands (national team)	+ 20"
7	Tayler Wiles (USA)	UnitedHealthcare	+ 22"
8	Katarzyna Pawłowska (POL)	Poland (national team)	+ 23"
9	Trixi Worrack (GER)	Canyon//SRAM	+ 23"
10	Emma White (USA)	United States (national team)	+ 23"

=== Stage 2 ===
14 July 2017 — Dörtendorf to Dörtendorf, 102.9 km (63.9 mi)

Stage 2 result
Rank	Rider	Team	Time
1	Lex Albrecht (CAN)	Tibco–Silicon Valley Bank	2h 44' 26"
2	Marta Lach (POL)	Poland (national team)	+ 2"
3	Romy Kasper (GER)	Germany (national team)	+ 6"
4	Tayler Wiles (USA)	UnitedHealthcare	+ 11"
5	Roxane Knetemann (NED)	Netherlands (national team)	+ 11"
6	Ilaria Sanguineti (ITA)	Bepink–Cogeas	+ 18"
7	Trixi Worrack (GER)	Canyon//SRAM	+ 18"
8	Lucy Kennedy (AUS)	Australia (national team)	+ 23"
9	Shannon Malseed (AUS)	Australia (national team)	+ 26"
10	Katarzyna Pawłowska (POL)	Poland (national team)	+ 28"

General classification after Stage 2
Rank	Rider	Team	Time
1	Lisa Brennauer (GER)	Canyon//SRAM	6h 27' 47"
2	Amy Pieters (NED)	Netherlands (national team)	+ 3"
3	Roxane Knetemann (NED)	Netherlands (national team)	+ 7"
4	Tayler Wiles (USA)	UnitedHealthcare	+ 9"
5	Lex Albrecht (CAN)	Tibco–Silicon Valley Bank	+ 13"
6	Trixi Worrack (GER)	Canyon//SRAM	+ 14"
7	Romy Kasper (GER)	Germany (national team)	+ 18"
8	Ellen van Dijk (NED)	Netherlands (national team)	+ 23"
9	Katarzyna Pawłowska (POL)	Poland (national team)	+ 25"
10	Eugenia Bujak (POL)	BTC City Ljubljana	+ 25"

=== Stage 3 ===
15 July 2017 — Weimar to Weimar, 123.4 km (76.7 mi)

Stage 3 result
Rank	Rider	Team	Time
1	Hayley Simmonds (GBR)	Team WNT	3h 21' 28"
2	Eugenia Bujak (POL)	BTC City Ljubljana	+ 53"
3	Katarzyna Pawłowska (POL)	Poland (national team)	+ 53"
4	Ilaria Sanguineti (ITA)	Bepink–Cogeas	+ 53"
5	Ellen van Dijk (NED)	Netherlands (national team)	+ 53"
6	Alison Jackson (CAN)	Bepink–Cogeas	+ 53"
7	Tiffany Cromwell (AUS)	Canyon//SRAM	+ 53"
8	Gracie Elvin (AUS)	Australia (national team)	+ 53"
9	Anna Zita Maria Stricker (ITA)	BTC City Ljubljana	+ 53"
10	Demi de Jong (NED)	Parkhotel Valkenburg–Destil	+ 53"

General classification after Stage 3
Rank	Rider	Team	Time
1	Hayley Simmonds (GBR)	Team WNT	9h 49' 50"
2	Lisa Brennauer (GER)	Canyon//SRAM	+ 18"
3	Amy Pieters (NED)	Netherlands (national team)	+ 19"
4	Roxane Knetemann (NED)	Netherlands (national team)	+ 25"
5	Tayler Wiles (USA)	UnitedHealthcare	+ 27"
6	Lex Albrecht (CAN)	Tibco–Silicon Valley Bank	+ 31"
7	Trixi Worrack (GER)	Canyon//SRAM	+ 32"
8	Eugenia Bujak (POL)	BTC City Ljubljana	+ 34"
9	Romy Kasper (GER)	Germany (national team)	+ 36"
10	Katarzyna Pawłowska (POL)	Poland (national team)	+ 39"

=== Stage 4 ===
16 July 2017 — Schmölln to Schmölln, 18.7 km (11.6 mi), individual time trial (ITT)

Stage 4 result
Rank	Rider	Team	Time
1	Lauren Stephens (USA)	Tibco–Silicon Valley Bank	26' 50"
2	Ellen van Dijk (NED)	Netherlands (national team)	+ 1"
3	Lisa Brennauer (GER)	Canyon//SRAM	+ 6"
4	Trixi Worrack (GER)	Canyon//SRAM	+ 36"
5	Olga Zabelinskaya (RUS)	Bepink–Cogeas	+ 40"
6	Mieke Kröger (GER)	Canyon//SRAM	+ 50"
7	Hayley Simmonds (GBR)	Team WNT	+ 50"
8	Tayler Wiles (USA)	UnitedHealthcare	+ 53"
9	Ann-Sophie Duyck (BEL)	Drops	+ 1' 02"
10	Ruth Winder (USA)	UnitedHealthcare	+ 1' 11"

General classification after Stage 4
Rank	Rider	Team	Time
1	Lisa Brennauer (GER)	Canyon//SRAM	10h 17' 04"
2	Ellen van Dijk (NED)	Netherlands (national team)	+ 18"
3	Hayley Simmonds (GBR)	Team WNT	+ 26"
4	Trixi Worrack (GER)	Canyon//SRAM	+ 44"
5	Tayler Wiles (USA)	UnitedHealthcare	+ 56"
6	Olga Zabelinskaya (RUS)	Bepink–Cogeas	+ 1' 13"
7	Roxane Knetemann (NED)	Netherlands (national team)	+ 1' 16"
8	Ann-Sophie Duyck (BEL)	Drops	+ 1' 25"
9	Amy Pieters (NED)	Netherlands (national team)	+ 1' 28"
10	Ruth Winder (USA)	UnitedHealthcare	+ 1' 37"

=== Stage 5 ===
17 July 2017 — Greiz to Greiz, 108.3 km (67.3 mi)

Stage 5 result
Rank	Rider	Team	Time
1	Tayler Wiles (USA)	UnitedHealthcare	2h 44' 33"
2	Ellen van Dijk (NED)	Netherlands (national team)	+ 1"
3	Leah Thomas (USA)	United States (national team)	+ 1"
4	Katarzyna Pawłowska (POL)	Poland (national team)	+ 1"
5	Romy Kasper (GER)	Germany (national team)	+ 1"
6	Lisa Brennauer (GER)	Canyon//SRAM	+ 1"
7	Agnieszka Skalniak (POL)	Poland (national team)	+ 1"
8	Eva Buurman (NED)	Parkhotel Valkenburg–Destil	+ 1"
9	Eugenia Bujak (POL)	BTC City Ljubljana	+ 1"
10	Alison Jackson (CAN)	Bepink–Cogeas	+ 1"

General classification after Stage 5
Rank	Rider	Team	Time
1	Lisa Brennauer (GER)	Canyon//SRAM	13h 01' 35"
2	Ellen van Dijk (NED)	Netherlands (national team)	+ 14"
3	Hayley Simmonds (GBR)	Team WNT	+ 29"
4	Trixi Worrack (GER)	Canyon//SRAM	+ 47"
5	Tayler Wiles (USA)	UnitedHealthcare	+ 48"
6	Olga Zabelinskaya (RUS)	Bepink–Cogeas	+ 1' 14"
7	Roxane Knetemann (NED)	Netherlands (national team)	+ 1' 19"
8	Ann-Sophie Duyck (BEL)	Drops	+ 1' 28"
9	Amy Pieters (NED)	Netherlands (national team)	+ 1' 30"
10	Ruth Winder (USA)	UnitedHealthcare	+ 1' 37"

=== Stage 6 ===
18 July 2017 — Gotha to Gotha, 75.8 km (47.1 mi)

Stage 6 result
Rank	Rider	Team	Time
1	Skylar Schneider (USA)	United States (national team)	1h 51' 11"
2	Alison Jackson (CAN)	Bepink–Cogeas	+ 0"
3	Rushlee Buchanan (NZL)	UnitedHealthcare	+ 0"
4	Eva Buurman (NED)	Parkhotel Valkenburg–Destil	+ 2"
5	Íngrid Drexel (MEX)	Tibco–Silicon Valley Bank	+ 2"
6	Maaike Boogaard (NED)	Netherlands (national team)	+ 5"
7	Silvia Valsecchi (ITA)	Bepink–Cogeas	+ 5"
8	Ingrid Lorvik (NOR)	Norway (national team)	+ 5"
9	Sophie de Boer (NED)	Parkhotel Valkenburg–Destil	+ 9"
10	Anna Christian (GBR)	Drops	+ 9"

Final general classification
Rank	Rider	Team	Time
1	Lisa Brennauer (GER)	Canyon//SRAM	14h 53' 00"
2	Ellen van Dijk (NED)	Netherlands (national team)	+ 19"
3	Hayley Simmonds (GBR)	Team WNT	+ 35"
4	Trixi Worrack (GER)	Canyon//SRAM	+ 52"
5	Tayler Wiles (USA)	UnitedHealthcare	+ 52"
6	Olga Zabelinskaya (RUS)	Bepink–Cogeas	+ 1' 22"
7	Roxane Knetemann (NED)	Netherlands (national team)	+ 1' 25"
8	Ann-Sophie Duyck (BEL)	Drops	+ 1' 34"
9	Amy Pieters (NED)	Netherlands (national team)	+ 1' 36"
10	Ruth Winder (USA)	UnitedHealthcare	+ 1' 43"

== Classification leadership table ==
In the 2017 Thüringen Rundfahrt der Frauen, six different jerseys were awarded. The most important was the general classification, which was calculated by adding each cyclist's finishing times on each stage. Time bonuses were awarded to the first three finishers on all mass-start stages: the stage winner won a ten-second bonus, with six and four seconds for the second and third riders respectively. Bonus seconds were also awarded to the first three riders at intermediate sprints; three seconds for the winner of the sprint, two seconds for the rider in second and one second for the rider in third. The rider with the least accumulated time is the race leader, identified by a yellow jersey. This classification was considered the most important of the 2017 Thüringen Rundfahrt der Frauen, and the winner of the classification was considered the winner of the race.

Points for the mountains classification
Position	1	2	3	4
Points for Category 1	7	5	3	2
Points for Category 2	5	3	2	0
Points for Category 3	3	2	1	0

There was also a mountains classification, the leadership of which was marked by a black, white and yellow jersey. In the mountains classification, points towards the classification were won by reaching the top of a climb before other cyclists. Each climb was categorised as either first, second, or third-category, with more points available for the higher-categorised climbs. First-category climbs awarded the most points; the first four riders were able to accrue points, compared with the first three on all other climbs.

Additionally, there was a sprints classification, which awarded a blue jersey. In the sprints classification, cyclists received points for finishing in the top 5 in a stage, except the time trials. For winning a stage, a rider earned 5 points, with 4 for second, 3 for third, 2 for fourth and a single point for 5th place. Points were also awarded at intermediate sprints on each mass-start stage – awarded on a 3–2–1 scale. The fourth jersey represented the young rider classification, marked by a red and white jersey. This was decided the same way as the general classification, but only riders born on or after 1 January 1995 were eligible to be ranked in the classification.

The fifth jersey represented the classification for German riders, marked by a white and blue jersey. This was decided on each day's stage results, but only riders born in Germany were eligible to be ranked in the classification. The sixth and final jersey (coloured white and green) was for the most active rider, decided daily by a race jury. A purple jersey, presented on the podium only, was also given to amateur riders. There was also a team classification, in which the times of the best three cyclists per team on each stage were added together; the leading team at the end of the race was the team with the lowest total time.

Stage	Winner	General classification	Sprints classification	Mountains classification	Young rider classification	Active rider classification	German rider classification	Team classification
P	Lisa Brennauer	Lisa Brennauer	Not awarded (Note: Jersey awarded post-stage, but no points awarded on the stage.)	Not awarded	Emma White	Not awarded	Lisa Brennauer	Canyon//SRAM
1	Tiffany Cromwell	Lisa Brennauer	Amy Pieters	Tayler Wiles	Emma White	Tayler Wiles	Lisa Brennauer	Canyon//SRAM
2	Lex Albrecht	Lisa Brennauer	Amy Pieters	Tayler Wiles	Marta Lach	Martina Ritter	Romy Kasper	Netherlands (national team)
3	Hayley Simmonds	Hayley Simmonds	Amy Pieters	Tayler Wiles	Nina Buysman	Aafke Soet	Beate Zanner	Netherlands (national team)
4	Lauren Stephens	Lisa Brennauer	Amy Pieters	Tayler Wiles	Emma White	Not awarded	Lisa Brennauer	Canyon//SRAM
5	Tayler Wiles	Lisa Brennauer	Amy Pieters	Tayler Wiles	Emma White	Leah Thomas	Romy Kasper	Canyon//SRAM
6	Skylar Schneider	Lisa Brennauer	Eugenia Bujak	Tayler Wiles	Emma White	Skylar Schneider	Lisa Brennauer	Canyon//SRAM
Final		Lisa Brennauer	Eugenia Bujak	Tayler Wiles	Emma White	Not awarded	Lisa Brennauer	Canyon//SRAM

== See also ==
- Thüringen Rundfahrt der Frauen
- 2017 in women's road cycling
