= Hayley Simmonds =

British bicycle racer

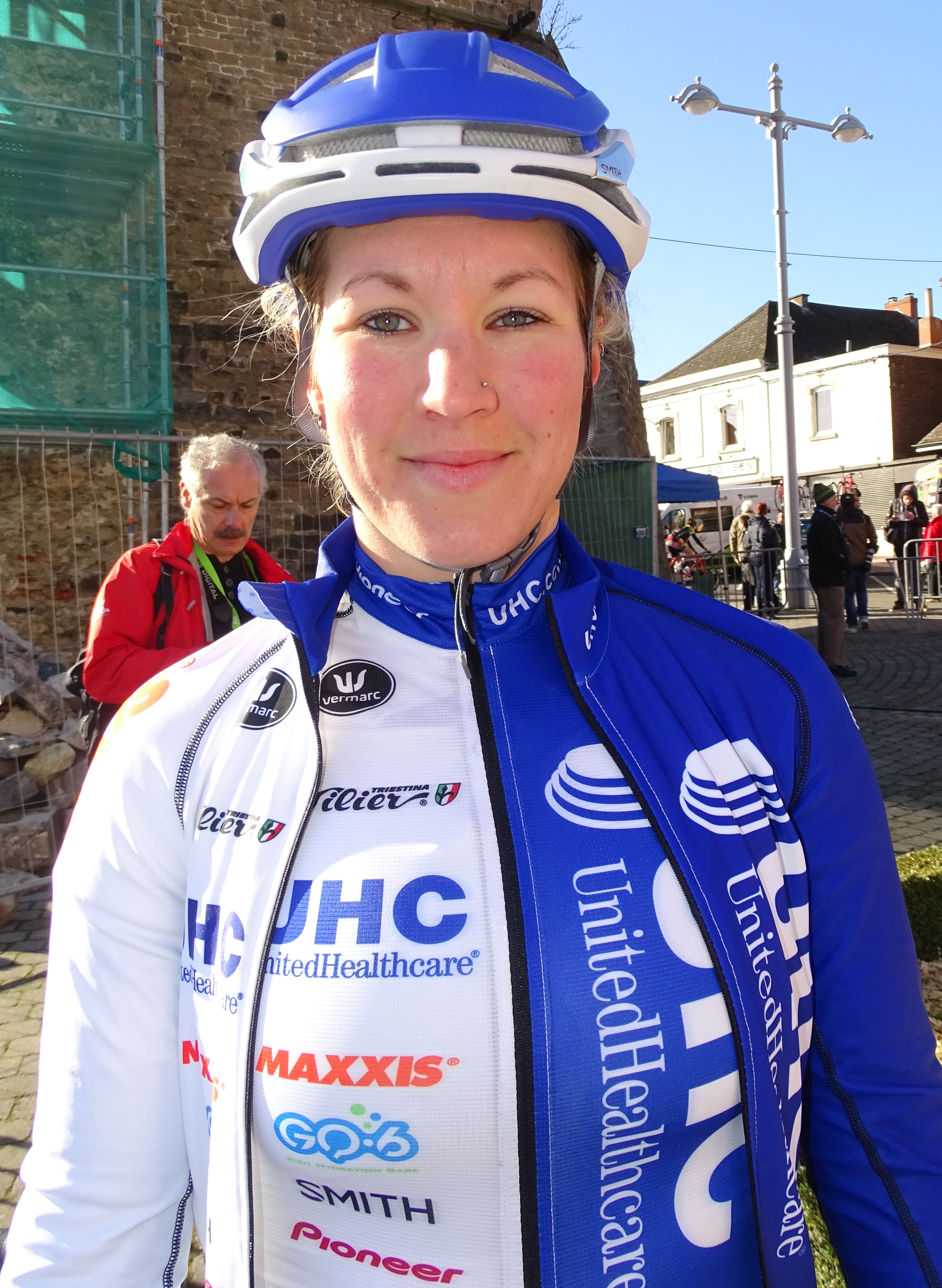
- Simmonds in 2016

Personal information
- Full name: Hayley Rebecca Simmonds
- Nickname: Hales
- Born: 22 July 1988 (age 38) Redditch, United Kingdom
- Height: 165 cm (5 ft 5 in)
- Weight: 55 kg (121 lb)

Cycling career
- Sport: Cycling
- Current team: O'Shea Redchilli Bikes
- Disciplines: Road; Track
- Role: Rider
- Rider type: Time trialist

Amateur teams
- 2012: Cambridge University CC
- 2013: GB Cycles.co.uk
- 2014–2015: Velosport Pasta Montegrappa

Professional teams
- 2016: UnitedHealthcare
- 2017–2018: Team WNT
- 2019: BTC City Ljubljana
- 2020: Ciclotel
- 2021–: DAS–Hutchinson

Major wins
- One-day races and Classics National Time Trial Championships (2015, 2016)
Medal record
Women's road cycling
Representing Great Britain
European Games
Bronze medal – third place	2019 Minsk	Time trial
Representing England
Commonwealth Games
Bronze medal – third place	2018 Gold Coast	Time trial

Hayley Rebecca Simmonds (born 22 July 1988) is a British racing cyclist, who currently rides for UCI Women's Continental Team DAS–Hutchinson.

== Career ==
Simmonds attended King's School, Worcester from 1999 until 2006. She studied Natural Sciences at Newnham College, Cambridge, and completed a doctorate in Experimental Chemistry at Gonville and Caius College, Cambridge in 2016. She was originally a rower at Cambridge, taking part in the 2009 reserve crew Boat Race, before switching to cycling in 2011.

In 2015, she won the British National Time Trial Championships, and in August 2015 she set a new British national 10 mile time record with a time of 19:46. Simmonds joined the UnitedHealthcare team in January 2016, however in June of that year she announced that she was leaving the team after struggling to find an efficient position on their Wilier Triestina time trial bicycles.

In November 2020, Simmonds signed a contract with CAMS–Tifosi, for the 2021 season.

== Major results ==
2013
1st Pedalpushers Circuit Race League No. 4
2nd Hog Hill Summer Series 9
3rd Individual pursuit, British Universities & Colleges Sport Track Championships
2014
RTTC National Time Trial Championships

1st 10-mile
1st 50-mile
2nd 25-mile

East London Velo Hog Hill Summer Series

1st Races 2 & 4

1st Individual pursuit, British Universities & Colleges Sport Track Championships
10th Chrono des Nations
2015
National Road Championships

1st Time trial
10th Road race

RTTC National Time Trial Championships

1st 25-mile
1st 100-mile

1st Overall Holme Valley Wheelers Stage Race

1st Stage 3

Redbridge CC Summer Series

1st Rounds 7 & 9

British Universities & Colleges Sport Track Championships

1st Points race
1st Individual pursuit

2nd National Hill Climb Championships

2nd Road race, British Universities & Colleges Sport Road Championships

3rd Chrono Champenois
8th Chrono des Nations
2016
1st Time trial, National Road Championships
2nd Chrono des Nations
6th Chrono Champenois
2017
2nd Taiwan KOM Challenge
3rd National Hill Climb Championships
3rd Overall Thüringen Rundfahrt der Frauen

1st Stage 3

3rd Chrono des Nations
National Road Championships

4th Time trial
8th Road race

4th Ljubljana–Domžale–Ljubljana TT
9th Overall Emakumeen Euskal Bira
10th Durango-Durango Emakumeen Saria
2018
2nd Ljubljana–Domžale–Ljubljana TT
Commonwealth Games

3rd Time trial
10th Road race

3rd Chrono Champenois
8th Time trial, UEC European Road Championships
2019
1st National Hill Climb Championships
2nd Time trial, National Road Championships
3rd Time trial, European Games
4th Chrono Champenois
4th Ljubljana–Domžale–Ljubljana TT
6th Chrono des Nations
7th Time trial, UEC European Road Championships
