= Skylar Schneider =

American cyclist (born 1998)

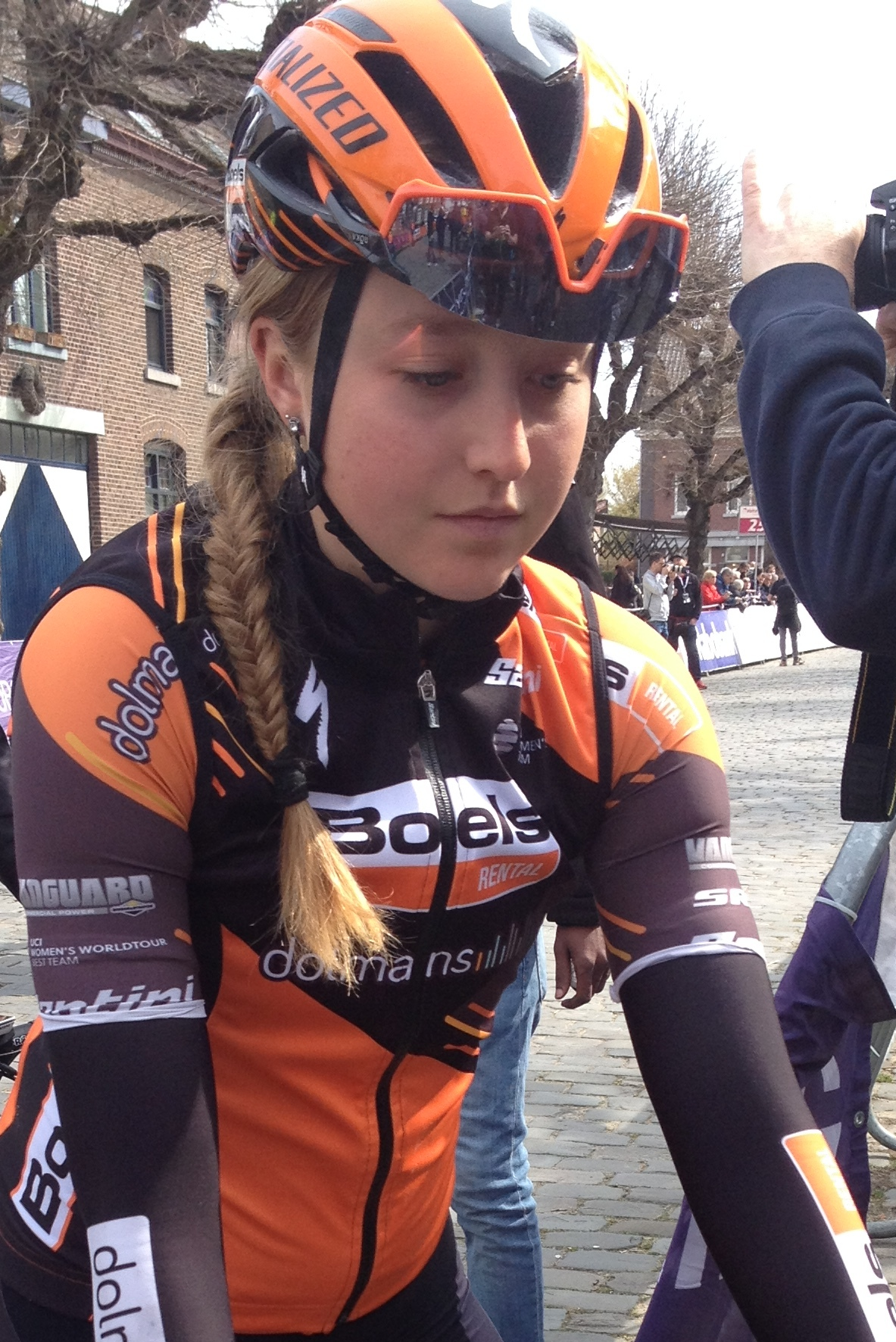
- Schneider in 2019.

Personal information
- Full name: Skylar Schneider
- Born: September 3, 1998 (age 28)

Cycling career
- Sport: Cycling
- Current team: L39ION of Los Angeles
- Discipline: Road
- Role: Rider

Amateur teams
- 2015–2017: ISCorp–SmartChoice
- 2021–: L39ION of Los Angeles

Professional teams
- 2017: Team Illuminate
- 2018–2020: Boels–Dolmans
Medal record
Women's road bicycle racing
Representing United States
Pan American Championships
Gold medal – first place	2023 Panama City	Road race
Bronze medal – third place	2017 Santo Domingo	Road race

Skylar Schneider (born September 3, 1998) is an American cyclist, who currently rides for American amateur team L39ION of Los Angeles.

== Career ==
As a junior at the 2016 UCI Road World Championships, Schneider finished second in the road race, while taking fourth in the time trial.

At the 2017 Pan American Road Cycling Championships, she took bronze in the road race.

Schneider won the sixth and final stage at the 2017 Thüringen Rundfahrt der Frauen.

== Major results ==
2015
1st Stage 11 Tour of America's Dairyland
3rd Time trial, National Junior Road Championships
7th Overall Tulsa Tough
2016
National Junior Road Championships

1st Road race
2nd Time trial

1st Rochester Twilight Criterium
UCI Junior Road World Championships

2nd Road race
4th Time trial

2nd Overall Tulsa Tough
3rd Sunny King Criterium
3rd TD Bank Mayor's Cup
2017
1st Stage 6 Thüringen Rundfahrt der Frauen
3rd Road race, Pan American Road Championships
3rd Overall Tulsa Tough
3rd Rochester Twilight Criterium
7th Overall Tour of America's Dairyland

1st Stage 4

2018
1st Stage 3b (TTT) Healthy Ageing Tour
5th Volta Limburg Classic
5th RaboRonde Heerlen
8th Overall Tulsa Tough
10th Ridderronde Maastricht
2019
3rd Overall Tulsa Tough
2021
1st Overall Joe Martin Stage Race

1st Points classification
1st Stages 1 & 4

1st Overall Tulsa Tough

1st Stages 1 & 3

1st Overall Intelligentsia Cup

1st West Dundee River Challenge
1st Mundelein Grand Prix p/b Lennar
1st Lombard Cycling Classic p/b DuPage Sports Commission
1st Dennis Jurs Memorial Race
1st Northwestern Medicine Lake Bluff Criterium
1st William Blair Grand Prix at Goose Island Beer Co.

1st Boise Twilight Criterium
1st Littleton Twilight Criterium
1st Spartanburg Criterium
1st Athens Twilight Criterium
1st Tour de Francis Park p/b Urban Chestnut Brewery
1st Giro della Montagna p/b Emerson
4th Overall Armed Forces Association Cycling Classic
5th Overall Tour of America's Dairyland

1st Tour of Hartland
1st Otto Wenz Cafe Hollander Downer Classic
1st Shorewood Criterium Cycling Classic
1st Highlands Criterium
1st Cafe Hollander Tosa Village Classic

2022
1st Sunny King Criterium
2nd La Picto - Charentaise
6th MerXem Classic
8th Overall Joe Martin Stage Race

1st Stage 1

Tour of America's Dairyland

1st West Allis Cheese Wheel Classic

2023
1st Road race, Pan American Road Championships
7th GP Eco-Struct/Thompson/Security Tools
7th Overall Joe Martin Stage Race

1st Points classification
1st Stage 1

9th Trofee Maarten Wynants
