= Luke Keough =

American cyclist

Personal information
- Full name: Luke Keough
- Born: August 10, 1991 (age 35) Sandwich, Massachusetts, U.S.
- Height: 1.75 m (5 ft 9 in)
- Weight: 68 kg (150 lb)

Cycling career
- Sport: Cycling
- Current team: Retired
- Disciplines: Road; Cyclo-cross; Mountain biking
- Role: Rider
- Rider type: Sprinter

Amateur team
- 2019: Texas Roadhouse

Professional teams
- 2012: Team Smartstop–Mountain Khakis
- 2013–2018: UnitedHealthcare

Luke Keough (born August 10, 1991) is an American former road and cyclo-cross racing cyclist, who competed as a professional from 2012 to 2018.

His brother Jake also competed as a professional cyclist. In 2017, he married fellow professional cyclist Kaitlin Keough.

== Major results ==
=== Road ===
2010
1st Kelly Cup
1st Concord Criterium
2011
1st Witches Cup
1st Exeter Hospital Criterium
2012
1st Tour of Somerville
1st Athens Twilight Criterium
1st Madeira Criterium
1st TD Bank Mayors Cup
3rd Harlem Skyscraper Classic
2013
1st Overall Tulsa Tough

1st Stages 1, 2 & 3

1st Overall Intelligentsia Cup

1st Stage 3

1st Old Pueblo Grand Prix
1st Wilmington Grand Prix
1st Historic Roswell Criterium
1st USA Crits Finals, Las Vegas
2nd Overall Tour de Grove
3rd Overall Tour of America's Dairyland
2014
1st Overall USA National Criterium Calendar
1st Stage 1 Tour de Taiwan
2nd Overall Tulsa Tough

1st Stage 2

2nd Overall Gateway Cup

1st Stage 1

2nd Dana Point Grand Prix
2nd Manhattan Beach Grand Prix
2015
2nd Sunny King Criterium
3rd Criterium, National Championships
2016
1st Rochester Twilight Criterium
3rd Criterium, National Championships
2017
Tour du Maroc

1st Stages 2, 3 & 9

=== Cyclo-cross ===
2006-2007
1st W.E. Stedman Grand Prix Juniors
1st New Gloucester Juniors 2
2nd Caster's Grand Prix Juniors
2nd Baystate Juniors
3rd New Gloucester Juniors 1
2007–2008
1st National Junior Championships
USGP of Cyclocross Juniors

1st Trenton 1
1st Trenton 2

1st Portland 2

3rd Portland 1

2008–2009
2nd National Junior Championships
USGP of Cyclocross Juniors

2nd West Windsor

2009–2010
2nd New Gloucester 1
3rd National Under-23 Championships
2010–2011
New England Championship Series

1st Northampton 1
1st Northampton 2

1st Nittany Lion Cross
2nd Baystate 2
2011–2012
New England Championship Series

1st Northampton 1
1st Northampton 2
1st Warwick 1
2nd Providence 2
3rd Warwick 2

3rd New Gloucester
