= Beanpot Cycling Classic =

Collegiate cycling race

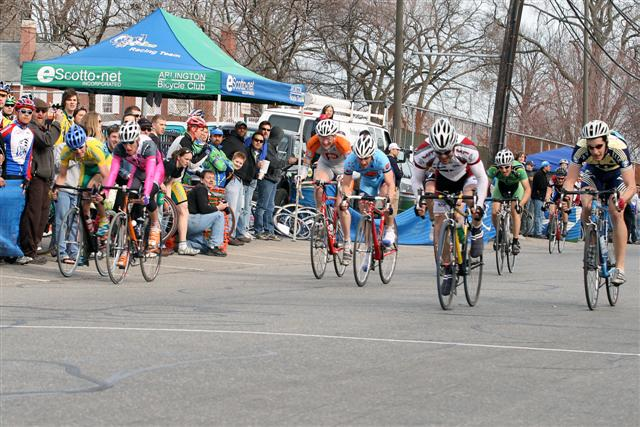
Riders sprint to the finish line at the 2007 Beanpot Men's A Criterium.

The Beanpot Cycling Classic is a collegiate cycling race weekend, held near Boston each spring. For many years it was the largest regular season collegiate race weekend in North America, hosting over 400 competitors each year.

== Races ==
The Beanpot consists of three races: a team time trial and a road race, both hosted in Grafton and Westborough, Massachusetts, and a criterium, held in Somerville, Massachusetts.

The race weekend is a regular season road race weekend in the Eastern Collegiate Cycling Conference, and winners garner points that advance them and their schools in divisional standings. Schools are awarded triple points, due to having three races in the event. Winning schools receive a clay beanpot as a trophy.

Team Time Trial

The team time trial is held on a seven-mile course. In 2005 and 2006 the time trial descended from Grafton center and traveled along mostly flat farmland before returning for a tough climb back into the town center.

Road Race

The road race is held on a 13-mile rolling course, starting and finishing at the campus of the Cummings School of Veterinary Medicine, the veterinary school at Tufts University.

Breaks often form on the deceptive Brigham Hill, a 3/4 mile climb with a false crest halfway up.

Optimal viewing locations are along Brigham Hill, along the hill on East St. in North Grafton, and at the start/finish at the Tufts Veterinary School.

Criterium

The criterium is held on a fast, technical course along Professor’s Row at the main campus of Tufts University. The fast, sharp turns and repeated climbs cause the race to break early. The second turn is especially demanding, positioned at the foot of a steep descent. Racers must be especially careful here to avert disaster.

== Firsts ==
In 2004 the Beanpot was the first collegiate race other than the collegiate national championships to have over 300 participants. Then in 2005 the Beanpot was the first collegiate race with over 400 racers. In 2006 that number swelled to 470 racers before breaking the 500-racer barrier and its own previous record for largest collegiate race in history with the 2007 edition. Over 60 different college/universities were represented with schools from 11 different states and two countries competing.

In 2005, the Beanpot was the first collegiate race to introduce fields split by division which is now required throughout the conference once fields reach a certain size limit. The Beanpot incorporated this innovation initially in order to accommodate the growing numbers of racers in each race.

The 2006 edition was the first collegiate race to offer a coached "introduction to racing" category which is now standard at all conference races. In this category, the first half of the race is neutral while coaches and experienced cyclists ride along the competitors coaching them and offering racing tips then halfway through the race the coaches leave and it becomes a normal race to the finish.

History was also in made 2006 when - to accommodate the increased number of women's competitors - Beanpot organizers instituted a women's C category for the first time in collegiate cycling history.

== Organization ==
The Beanpot is organized by a consortium of Boston-area college cycling clubs. Historically, the time trial is organized by Boston University, the road race by Harvard University, and the criterium by Tufts University. MIT, Northeastern University, Wentworth Institute of Technology, and Boston College coordinate finances, promotion, fund-raising, and administration for the event.

Since the 2005 edition two raffles are typically held to raise funds. One raffle has cycling-specific prizes such as components or wheels. The other raffle has general-interest prizes such as gift certificates to local restaurants. The raffles were added to help offset the expense of hosting a race of this magnitude.

== Past Beanpot Event Directors ==
Year	Committee Chair / Event Director
2008	Unknown
2007	Caitlin Thompson (Tufts)
2006	Keith Hemmert (Harvard)
2005	Andrew Armstrong (Boston College)
2004	Brendan Dallas & Nathalie Roy (Harvard)
2003	Unknown
2002	Unknown

== Past Winning Teams ==
Year	1st	2nd	3rd
2008	UVM	MIT	Yale
2007	UNH	Dartmouth	UVM
2006	UVM	UNH	Dartmouth
2005	UVM	Dartmouth	Penn. State
2004	UVM	Penn. State	Dartmouth

== Notable Past Participants ==
A number of current professional level athletes as well as other cycling dignitaries have attended the Beanpot over the years.

The then USA Cycling CEO Gerard Bisceglia attended the 2005 edition. Former professional racer and current pro team manager Jonathan Vaughters was a guest speaker at the pasta dinner at the 2004 Beanpot. Mark Abramson, former president of the USA Cycling Board of Trustees, was a long time Beanpot attendee as he was the long-time conference director for the Eastern Collegiate Cycling Conferencen (ECCC). He was conference director during the Beanpot's significant years of 2004-2007. Prior to that he was a member of the Tufts team and organized & raced in the Tufts crit existing prior to the modern iteration of the Beanpot.

Notable professional riders who have raced the Beanpot include multi-time Olympian & 23+ time national champion Bobby Lea as well as his Penn State teammate Mike Friedman. Ted King also competed in the Beanpot while attending Middlebury College. Adam Carr is a domestic professional cyclist that has competed in the Beanpot.

== See also ==
- USA Cycling
