= Criterium =

Bicycle race held on a short course

A criterium, or crit, is a bike race consisting of several laps around a closed circuit, the length of each lap or circuit ranging from about 400 m to 10,000 m.

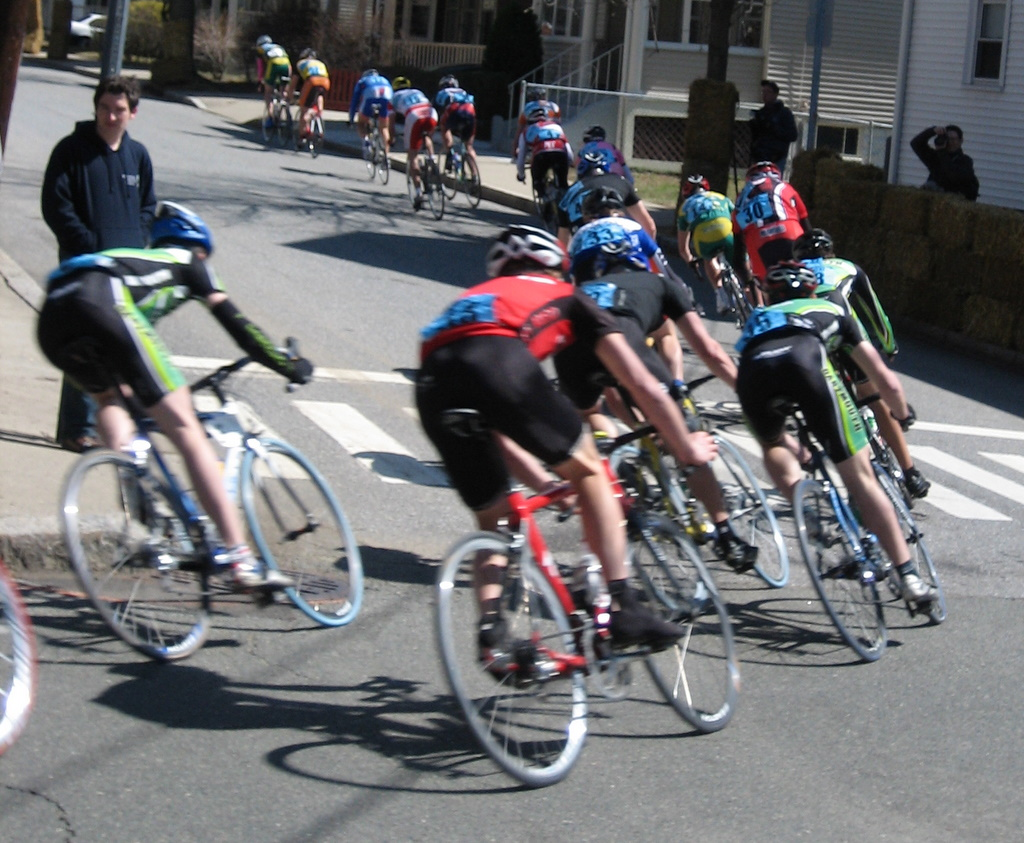
Collegiate cyclists take a tight downhill corner in the Boston Beanpot Criterium at Tufts University.

== Overview ==
Race length can be determined by a number of laps or total time, in which case the number of remaining laps is calculated as the race progresses. Generally the event's duration (commonly one hour) is shorter than that of a traditional road race — which can last many hours, sometimes over the course of several days or even weeks, as in a Grand Tour. However, the average speed and intensity are appreciably higher. The winner is the first rider to cross the finish line without having been "lapped".

Events often have prizes (called primes /priːmz/ and are usually cash) for winning specific intermediate laps (for instance, every 10th lap). A bell is usually rung to announce to the riders that whoever wins the next lap will be awarded the prime.

Success in road criteriums requires a mix of technical skills — in particular, the ability to corner smoothly while holding the line on the road rapidly — and riding safely with a group on a circuit with sprint ability to attack other riders and repeatedly accelerate hard from corners.

Criteriums are relatively easy to organise, do not require a large amount of space, and are good for live spectators as they allow them to see the riders pass by many times. They are the most common type of bicycle racing in the continental United States. They are also gaining popularity as a format for mountain bike events.

Belgium's Flanders region hosts a number of criteriums, as does the Netherlands. The most notable of these are held in late July and early August, just after the Tour de France. However, criteriums in Europe are mostly held in the format of a points race. First, second, and third rider at every 5th lap gets 3, 2, 1 points respectively, with double points for the final sprint. It was a long tradition that after the Tour these criteriums were fixed to have favourable results for local favourites, who may be participating for show after having ridden in a larger race such as the Tour de France.

== Equipment ==
Racing bicycles used for Criteriums often have subtle, but significantly different geometry from those used in other mass-start, multi stage road race events. A Tour bicycle frameset's emphasis is on tracking plus stability while the Criterium-centric geometry strives to achieve stability and balance it with agility. Consequently Criterium racers will often choose bicycles with:

- a wheelbase shortened as much as possible, for increased turning ability, with the shortest chainstays possible, and a slightly shortened top tube (often causing some toe overlap with the front wheel on smaller frame sizes).
- forks with increased rake to reduce trail. Bikes with reduced trail handle more responsively, albeit at the cost of stability.
- slightly shorter cranks (145–170 mm), often slightly higher bottom bracket (+10 mm) to facilitate pedaling through turns without hitting or scraping the pedals on the ground. (Criterium trained racers who jump to stage geometry need to understand that in turns the BB (bottom bracket) is often lower to the ground in stage geometry so pedaling in a turn or around elevated ground may not be prudent.)
- Aerodynamic wheels. Crits are high speed events with pro races often averaging up to 50 km/h (31 mph), making aerodynamics a large factor, even in the pack.
- Handlebars with a steeper curve than most road bikes, which provides more stability and a more aggressive posture that is beneficial for crits as riders spend most of their (short race) time riding the drops due to being able to produce more power during sprinting as well as having better control of the brake lever in turns

== Classifications ==
In the UK, Elite and Cat 1+2 riders often race together whilst Cat 3+4 riders race separately; however Elite and Cat 1+2+3 and 4th category only events are also common. Some events known as a handicap races allow Elite and Cat 1+2+3+4 riders to compete in the same race with riders from the different categories being set off at defined intervals starting with the 4th category. Most events contain a women's race which accepts all categories of female riders; however some women's events are only open to higher category riders, whilst some events allow women to compete with category Cat 3+4 men.

In the United States, the Men's Field (Pro + Cat 1 + Cat 2, and sometimes Cat 3) generally race together, Cat 3's often have their own races, Cat 4/5 Men often race together, but sometimes have their own races. In addition, there are a variety of masters categories which can be raced. The Women typically have two separate races, the P/1/2 (3) and the 3/4.

Collegiate racing in the USA is sanctioned by USA Cycling (USAC) and consists of four categories: A, B, C, and D. Category A is equivalent to the P-1-2-3 field, category B is equivalent to the Cat 3-4 field, category C is equivalent to Cat 4/5, and D is equivalent to Cat 5. Thus, collegiate criteriums are organized accordingly.

The races will also vary depending upon how many people from separate teams enter, which will impact whether it will be a "free-for-all" or a team-focused event.
