= Eduin Becerra =

Venezuelan cyclist

Personal information
- Born: 28 September 1985 (age 41) Santa Cruz de Mora, Venezuela

Cycling career
- Sport: Cycling
- Current team: Team Trululu Grupo La Guacamaya
- Discipline: Road
- Role: Rider

Amateur teams
- 2005: Café Flor de Patria–SATRUD
- 2006–2007: Fundación Rujano–Triple Gordo-Santa Cruz de Mora
- 2008: Gobernación de Apure–Indeportes Páez
- 2008–2009: Sumiglow–Fundemer–Escaladores de Mérida
- 2010: Gobierno de Mérida-Santa Cruz de Mora
- 2010: Alcaldia de Maracaibo
- 2011–2013: Gobernación del Zulia
- 2014: Gobernación de Mérida
- 2014: Pédale Pilotine
- 2015–2018: Kino Táchira
- 2017–2020: Pédale Pilotine
- 2019: Loteria del Táchira
- 2020–2021: Osorio Group City Bike
- 2022–2024: Fundación Ángeles Hernandez
- 2025–: Team Trululu Grupo La Guacamaya

Eduin Becerra (born 28 September 1985) is a Venezuelan cyclist, who currently rides for Venezuelan amateur team Team Trululu Grupo La Guacamaya.

== Major results ==
2008
3rd Overall Vuelta a Guatemala
7th Overall Vuelta a Venezuela
2009
5th Overall Vuelta al Táchira
10th Overall Vuelta a Venezuela
2010
7th Overall Tour de Guadeloupe

1st Stages 4 & 6

2011
7th Overall Vuelta al Táchira

1st Stage 9

2012
5th Time trial, National Road Championships
6th Overall Vuelta al Táchira
6th Overall Vuelta a Venezuela
2013
National Road Championships

1st Road race
4th Time trial

5th Overall Vuelta al Táchira
2015
1st Overall Vuelta a Trujillo
2016
5th Time trial, National Road Championships
2017
6th Overall Vuelta al Táchira
2018
1st Stage 8a Tour de Martinique
2019
1st Overall Tour de Martinique

1st Stages 4 & 8b (ITT)

2022
2nd Overall Vuelta al Táchira

1st Stage 5

2023
5th Overall Vuelta al Táchira
2024
7th Overall Vuelta al Táchira
2025
1st Overall Vuelta al Táchira

1st Stage 7
