= José Daniel Bernal =

Colombian cyclist

José Daniel Bernal García (born March 15, 1973, in Bogotá) is a male road cyclist from Colombia.

== Career ==
1992
1st in General Classification Vuelta a El Salvador (ESA)
1997
1st in Stage 11 Vuelta a Colombia, Puerto Salgar (COL)
2000
1st in General Classification Tour de la Guadeloupe (GUA)
2002
1st in Stage 8 Vuelta a Guatemala, San Marcos, Guatemala (GUA)
2nd in General Classification Vuelta a Guatemala (GUA)
2003
1st in Stage 9 part b Tour de la Guadeloupe (GUA)
1st in General Classification Tour de la Guadeloupe (GUA)
2005
2nd in General Classification Tour de la Guadeloupe (GUA)
1st in Stage 9 part b Tour de la Guadeloupe, Abymes (GUA)
2006
2nd in General Classification Tour de la Guadeloupe (GUA)
2007
3rd in Circuito de Combita (COL)
2009
1st in Stage 2 part b Tour de la Guadeloupe, TTT, Les Abymes (GUA)

alongside Boris Carène, Ismael Sarmiento and Nicolas Dumont
