= 2025 national road cycling championships =

The 2025 national road cycling championships are being held throughout the year and are organised by the UCI member federations. They began in Australia with the Australian National Time Trial Championships events on 9 January.

== Jerseys ==
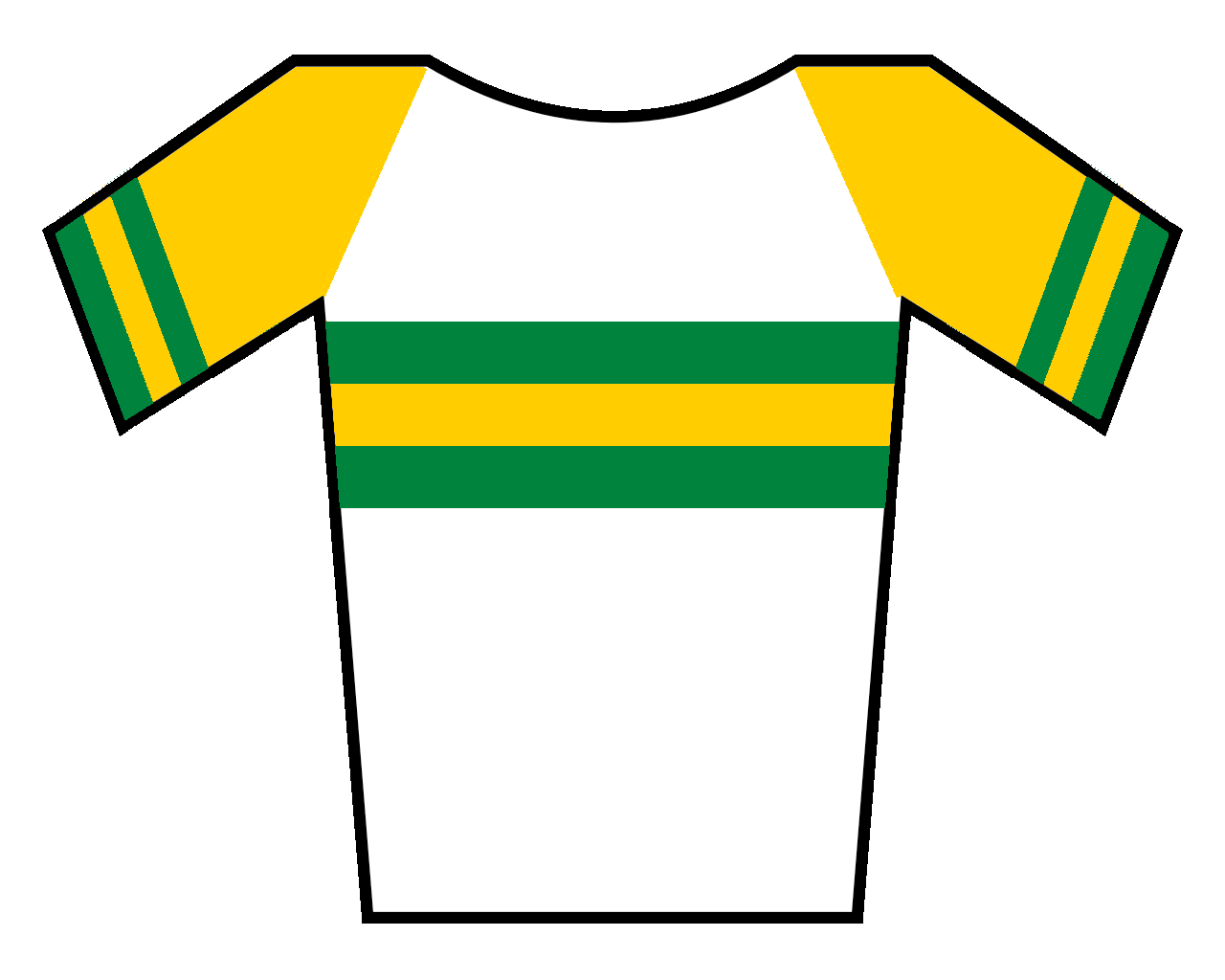
Australian Champion

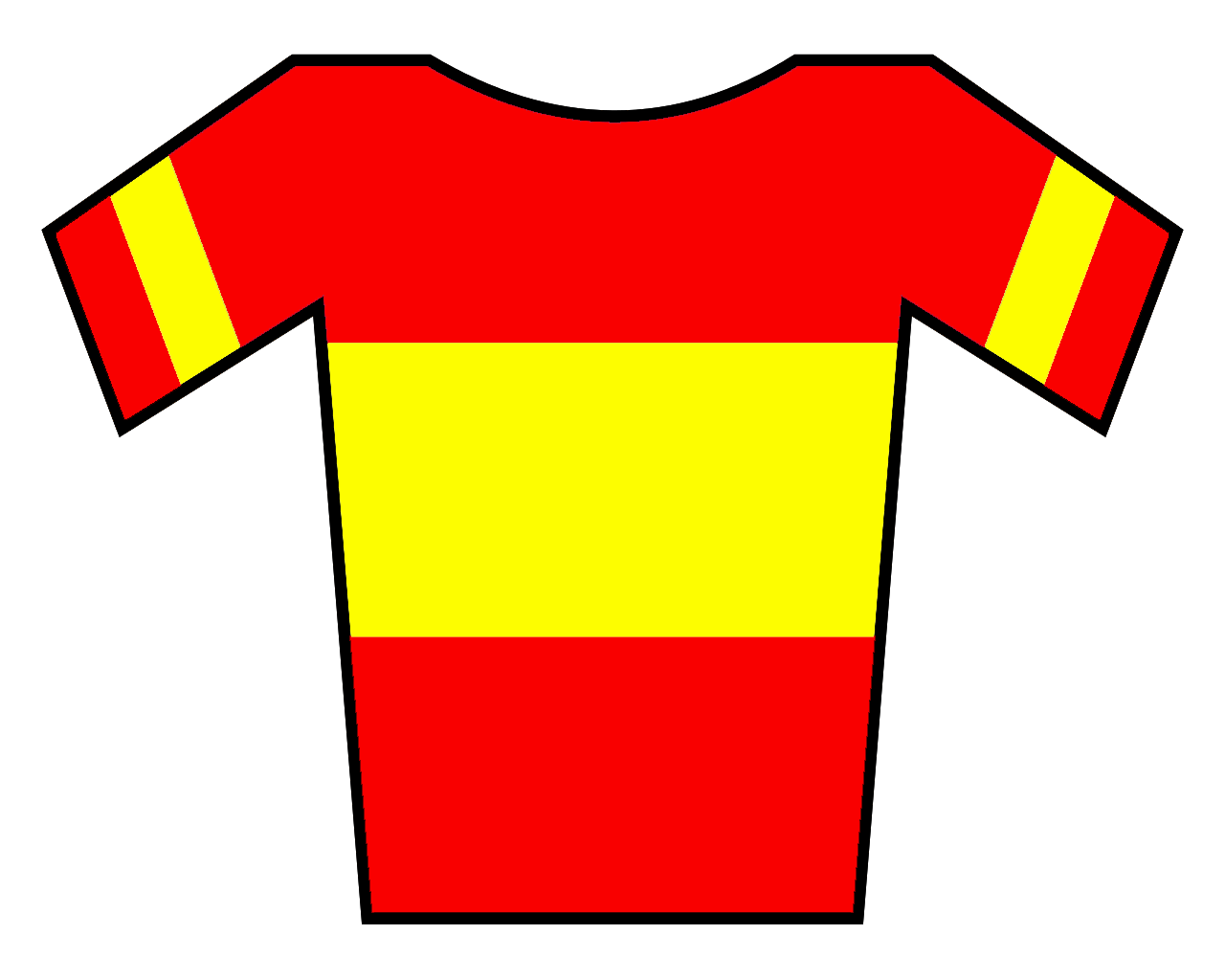
Spanish Champion

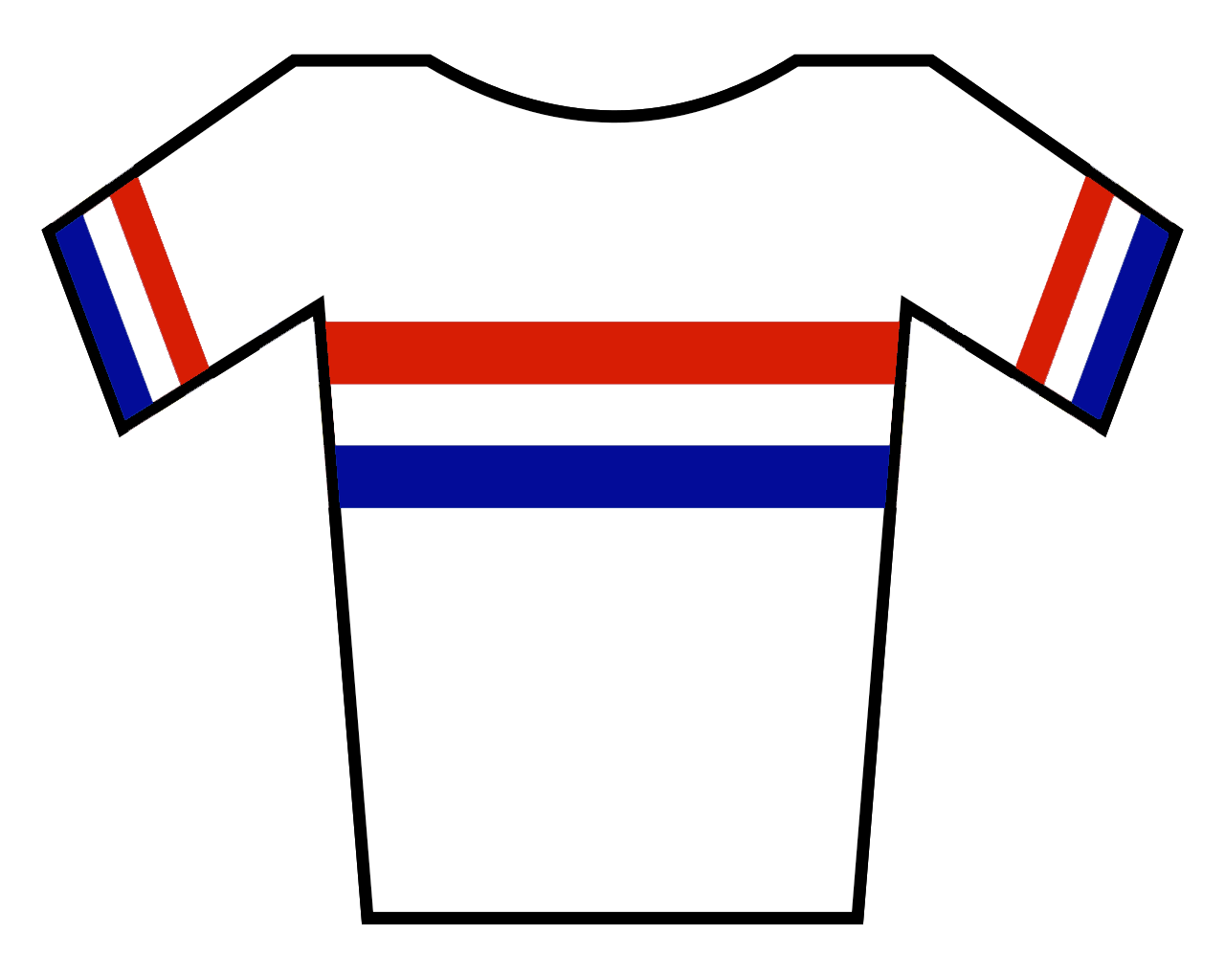
British
Champion

The winner of each national championship wears the national jersey in all their races for the next year in the respective discipline, apart from the World Championships and the Olympics, or unless they are wearing a classification leader's jersey in a stage race. Most national champion jerseys tend to represent a country's flag or use the colours from it, like the Spanish and British jerseys, respectively. Jerseys may also feature traditional sporting colours of a country that are not derived from a national flag, such as the green and gold jerseys of Australian national champions.

== 2025 champions ==
=== Men's Elite ===
Country	Men's Elite Road Race Champion	Road Race Champion's Team	Men's Elite Time Trial Champion	Time Trial Champion's Team
Algeria	Yacine Hamza		Azzedine Lagab	Azzedine Lagab
Argentina	Leonardo Cobarrubia	Sindicato de Empleados Públicos of San Juan	Mateo Kalejmann	Supermercados Froiz
Australia	Luke Durbridge	Team Jayco–AlUla	Luke Plapp	Team Jayco–AlUla
Austria	Tim Wafler	Tirol KTM Cycling Team	Felix Großschartner	UAE Team Emirates XRG
Belarus	Yauheni Karaliok		Dzianis Mazur	RCOP Belarus
Belgium	Tim Wellens	UAE Team Emirates XRG	Remco Evenepoel	Soudal–Quick-Step
Belize			Cory Williams	Miami Blazers
Benin	Ricardo Sodjede			
Bermuda	Conor White	Muc-Off-SRCT-Storck	Nicholas Narraway	Tenerife-BikePoint-LaSede
Bolivia	Eduardo Edwin Moyata Cruz		Freddy González	Pío Rico Cycling Team
Burkina Faso	Daouda Soulama			
Cameroon	Fabrice Chofor	SNH Vélo Club		
Canada	Derek Gee	Israel–Premier Tech	Michael Leonard	INEOS Grenadiers
Chile	Héctor Quintana	Plus Performance - Solutos	Héctor Quintana	Plus Performance - Solutos
China	Miao Chengshuo	Camp Cycling Club	Xue Ming	
Colombia	Egan Bernal	INEOS Grenadiers	Egan Bernal	INEOS Grenadiers
Costa Rica	Gabriel Rojas		Donovan Ramírez	
Cuba	José Alberto Domínguez		Yunior Mandin	
Curaçao	Halim Rosalina		Luis Parra	
Cyprus	Andreas Miltiadis		Andreas Miltiadis	Roojai Insurance
Czech Republic	Mathias Vacek	Lidl–Trek	Mathias Vacek	Lidl–Trek
Denmark	Søren Kragh Andersen	Lidl–Trek	Mads Pedersen	Lidl–Trek
Dominican Republic			Erlin Antonio Garcia	Foundation Cycling New York
Ecuador	Jhonatan Narváez	UAE Team Emirates XRG	Jefferson Cepeda	Movistar Team
Egypt	Abdul Rauf Ahmed Abdul Rauf		Ahmed Elsenfawi	
El Salvador	Brandon Ulises Rodríguez		Brandon Ulises Rodríguez	
Eritrea	Nahom Zeray	Team Ukyo	Amanuel Ghebreigzabhier	Lidl–Trek
Estonia	Madis Mihkels	EF Education–EasyPost	Rein Taaramäe	Kinan Racing Team
Eswatini	Kwanele Jele			
Ethiopia			Negasi Haylu Abreha	Sam - Vitalcare - Dynatek
Finland	Johan Nordlund		Trond Larsen	
France	Dorian Godon	Decathlon–AG2R La Mondiale	Bruno Armirail	Decathlon–AG2R La Mondiale
Germany	Georg Zimmermann	Intermarché–Wanty	Maximilian Schachmann	Soudal–Quick-Step
Greece	Nikiforos Arvanitou	Novapor Theseus SportsClub	Georgios Bouglas	Burgos Burpellet BH
Guatemala	Edgar Geovanny Torres		Sergio Chumil	Burgos Burpellet BH
Hong Kong	Ng Pak Hang	HKSI Pro Cycling Team	Tsun Wai Chu	HKSI Pro Cycling Team
Hungary	Márton Dina	Euskaltel–Euskadi	János Pelikán	Team United Shipping
India	Bhagirath Bhagirath		Harshveer Sekhon	
Indonesia			Muhammad Syelhan	ASC Monsters Indonesia
Ireland	Rory Townsend	Q36.5 Pro Cycling Team	Ryan Mullen	Red Bull–Bora–Hansgrohe
Italy	Filippo Conca	Swatt Club	Filippo Ganna	INEOS Grenadiers
Japan	Marino Kobayashi	Team Ukyo	Shunsuke Imamura	Wanty–Nippo–ReUz
Kazakhstan	Yevgeniy Fedorov	XDS Astana Team	Yevgeniy Fedorov	XDS Astana Team
Laos	Ariya Phounsavath	Roojai Insurance	Ariya Phounsavath	Roojai Insurance
Latvia	Toms Skujiņš	Lidl–Trek	Toms Skujiņš	Lidl–Trek
Lesotho	Kabelo Makatile	UCI WCC Team	Kabelo Makatile	UCI WCC Team
Lithuania	Aivaras Mikutis	Tudor Pro Cycling Team	Aivaras Mikutis	Tudor Pro Cycling Team
Luxembourg	Arthur Kluckers	Tudor Pro Cycling Team	Bob Jungels	INEOS Grenadiers
Malaysia	Muhammad Nur Aiman Bin Rosli	Terengganu Cycling Team	Muhammad Nur Aiman Bin Rosli	Terengganu Cycling Team
Mauritius	Torea Celestin		Alexandre Mayer	Burgos Burpellet BH
Mexico	Isaac del Toro	UAE Team Emirates XRG	Isaac del Toro	UAE Team Emirates XRG
Mongolia	Tegsh-Bayar Batsaikhan	Roojai Insurance	Jambaljamts Sainbayar	Burgos Burpellet BH
Montenegro	Aleksandar Radunović		Aleksandar Radunović	
Namibia	Alex Miller	Swatt Club	Alex Miller	Swatt Club
Netherlands	Danny van Poppel	Red Bull–Bora–Hansgrohe	Daan Hoole	Lidl–Trek
New Zealand	Paul Wright	Factor Racing	Finn Fisher-Black	Red Bull–Bora–Hansgrohe
Norway	Andreas Leknessund	Uno-X Mobility	Tobias Foss	INEOS Grenadiers
Pakistan	Ali Jawaid	SSGC Pro Cycling	Ali Jawaid	SSGC Pro Cycling
Panama	Roberto Carlos González	Team Solution Tech–Vini Fantini	Carlos Samudio	Team Solution Tech–Vini Fantini
Paraguay	Carlos Vidal Domínguez		Francisco Daniel Riveros	
Peru	Bill Toscano		Robinson Steven Ruiz	Sindicato de Empleados Públicos of San Juan
Philippines	Marcelo Felipe	Victoria Sports Pro Cycling	Nash Lim	
Poland	Rafał Majka	UAE Team Emirates XRG	Filip Maciejuk	Red Bull–Bora–Hansgrohe
Portugal	Ivo Oliveira	UAE Team Emirates XRG	António Morgado	UAE Team Emirates XRG
Puerto Rico	Abner González	Caja Rural–Seguros RGA		
Romania	Gerhard-Cristin Moldansky	MENtoRISE Teem CCN	Emil Dima	
Rwanda	Eric Nkundabera		Samuel Niyonkuru	Team Amani
Serbia	Veljko Stojnić	Team United Shipping	Dušan Rajović	Team Solution Tech–Vini Fantini
Singapore	Boon Kiak Yeo		Zhen Yu Darren Lim	
Slovenia	Jakob Omrzel	Bahrain Victorious Development Team	Mihael Štajnar	Pogi Team Gusto Ljubljana
Slovakia	Lukáš Kubiš	Unibet Tietema Rockets	Matthias Schwarzbacher	UAE Team Emirates Gen Z
South Africa	Daniyal Mathews	Team Siata	Alan Hatherly	Team Jayco–AlUla
South Korea	Yun Jaebin	Seoul Cycling Team	Choe Hyeong Min	Geumsan Insam Cello
Spain	Iván Romeo	Movistar Team	Abel Balderstone	Caja Rural–Seguros RGA
Sweden	Hugo Forssell	CK Hymer	Jakob Söderqvist	Lidl–Trek Future Racing
Switzerland	Mauro Schmid	Team Jayco–AlUla	Mauro Schmid	Team Jayco–AlUla
Taiwan	Feng Chun-kai	Utsunomiya Blitzen	Feng Chun-kai	Utsunomiya Blitzen
Thailand	Sarawut Sirironnachai		Peerapol Chawchiangkwang	Thailand Continental Cycling Team
Tunisia	Mohamed Aziz Dellai		Mohamed Aziz Dellai	
Turkey	Samet Bulut		Burak Abay	Konya Büyükşehir Belediye Spor
Uganda	Charles Kagimu		Charles Kagimu	Team Amani
United Arab Emirates	Mohammad Almutaiwei	UAE Team Emirates Gen Z	Abdulla Jasim Al-Ali	UAE Team Emirates Gen Z
United Kingdom	Samuel Watson	INEOS Grenadiers	Ethan Hayter	Soudal–Quick-Step
United States	Quinn Simmons	Lidl–Trek	Artem Shmidt	INEOS Grenadiers
Ukraine	Heorhii Antonenko		Anatoliy Budyak	Terengganu Cycling Team
Uruguay	Guillermo Thomas Silva	Caja Rural–Seguros RGA	Eric Fagúndez	Burgos Burpellet BH
Venezuela	Orluis Aular	Movistar Team	Orluis Aular	Movistar Team
Zimbabwe	Matthew Denslow		Rodrick Shumba	

==== Champions in UCI Men's teams ====
UCI WorldTeams
Team	Road Race Champions	Time Trial Champions
Alpecin–Deceuninck		
Arkéa–B&B Hotels		
Cofidis		
Decathlon–AG2R La Mondiale	Dorian Godon (FRA)	Bruno Armirail (FRA)
EF Education–EasyPost	Madis Mihkels (EST)	
Groupama–FDJ		
INEOS Grenadiers	Egan Bernal (COL); Samuel Watson (GBR)	Michael Leonard (CAN); Egan Bernal (COL); Filippo Ganna (ITA); Bob Jungels (LUX); Tobias Foss (NOR); Artem Shmidt (USA)
Intermarché–Wanty	Georg Zimmermann (GER)	
Lidl–Trek	Mathias Vacek (CZE); Søren Kragh Andersen (DEN); Toms Skujiņš (LAT); Quinn Simmons (USA)	Mathias Vacek (CZE); Mads Pedersen (DEN); Amanuel Ghebreigzabhier (ERI); Toms Skujiņš (LAT); Daan Hoole (NED)
Movistar Team	Iván Romeo (ESP); Orluis Aular (VEN)	Jefferson Cepeda (ECU); Orluis Aular (VEN)
Red Bull–Bora–Hansgrohe	Danny Van Poppel (NED)	Ryan Mullen (IRL); Finn Fisher-Black (NZL); Filip Maciejuk (POL)
Soudal–Quick-Step		Remco Evenepoel (BEL); Ethan Hayter (GBR); Maximilian Schachmann (GER)
Team Bahrain Victorious		
Team Picnic–PostNL		
Team Jayco–AlUla	Luke Durbridge (AUS); Mauro Schmid (SUI)	Luke Plapp (AUS); Alan Hatherly (RSA); Mauro Schmid (SUI)
UAE Team Emirates XRG	Tim Wellens (BEL); Jhonatan Narváez (ECU); Isaac del Toro (MEX); Rafał Majka (POL); Ivo Oliveira (POR)	Felix Großschartner (AUT); Isaac del Toro (MEX); António Morgado (POR)
Visma–Lease a Bike		
XDS Astana Team	Yevgeniy Fedorov (KAZ)	Yevgeniy Fedorov (KAZ)

UCI ProTeams
Team	Road Race Champions	Time Trial Champions
Burgos Burpellet BH		Georgios Bouglas (GRE); Sergio Chumil (GUA); Alexandre Mayer (MRI); Jambaljamts Sainbayar (MGL); Eric Fagúndez (URU)
Caja Rural–Seguros RGA	Abner González (PUR); Guillermo Thomas Silva (URU)	Abel Balderstone (ESP)
Equipo Kern Pharma		
Euskaltel–Euskadi	Márton Dina (HUN)	
Israel–Premier Tech	Derek Gee (CAN)	
Lotto		
Q36.5 Pro Cycling Team	Rory Townsend (IRL)	
Team Flanders–Baloise		
Team Novo Nordisk		
Team Polti VisitMalta		
Team Solution Tech–Vini Fantini	Roberto Carlos González (PAN)	Carlos Samudio (PAN); Dušan Rajović (SRB)
Team TotalEnergies		
Tudor Pro Cycling Team	Aivaras Mikutis (LTU); Arthur Kluckers (LUX)	Aivaras Mikutis (LTU)
Unibet Tietema Rockets	Lukáš Kubiš (SVK)	
Uno-X Mobility	Andreas Leknessund (NOR)	
VF Group–Bardiani–CSF–Faizanè		
Wagner Bazin WB		

=== Women's Elite ===
Country	Women's Elite Road Race Champion	Road Race Champion's Team	Women's Elite Time Trial Champion	Time Trial Champion's Team
Afghanistan	Fariba Hashimi	Ceratizit Pro Cycling	Fariba Hashimi	Ceratizit Pro Cycling
Algeria	Nesrine Houili		Nesrine Houili	
Argentina	Jennifer Francone		Fiorella Malaspina	
Australia	Lucinda Stewart	Liv AlUla Jayco	Brodie Chapman	UAE Team ADQ
Austria	Kathrin Schweinberger	Human Powered Health	Christina Schweinberger	Fenix–Deceuninck
Belgium	Justine Ghekiere	AG Insurance–Soudal	Lotte Kopecky	Team SD Worx–Protime
Belize			Patricia Chavarria	
Benin	Charlotte Metoevi		Hermionne Ahouissou	
Bolivia			Wanda Florencia Villanueva	Cantabria Deporte - Rio Miera
Burkina Faso	Awa Bamogo			
Canada			Olivia Baril	Movistar Team
Chile	Catalina Soto	Laboral Kutxa–Fundación Euskadi	Catalina Soto	Laboral Kutxa–Fundación Euskadi
Colombia	Juliana Londoño	Team Picnic–PostNL	Diana Peñuela	Siscrédito-GW
Cuba	Marlies Mejías	Virginia's Blue Ridge–TWENTY24	Marlies Mejías	Virginia's Blue Ridge–TWENTY24
Czech Republic	Kristýna Burlová	Ceratizit Pro Cycling	Julia Kopecký	Team SD Worx–Protime
Denmark	Alberte Greve	Uno-X Mobility	Rebecca Koerner	Uno-X Mobility
Dominican Republic			Flor Espiritusanto	
Ecuador	Natalia Vasquez	Movistar - Best PC	Miryam Núñez	
Egypt	Ebtissam Mohamed	Dubai Police Cycling Team	Ebtissam Mohamed	Dubai Police Cycling Team
El Salvador			Sauking Shi	Team Santa Ana
Eritrea	Monalisa Araya			
Estonia	Elisabeth Ebras	BePink–Imatra–Bongioanni	Laura Lizette Sander	Team Coop–Repsol
Eswatini	Mandiswa Fakudze			
Ethiopia			Flor Espiritusanto	
Finland	Anniina Ahtosalo	Uno-X Mobility	Anniina Ahtosalo	Uno-X Mobility
France	Marie Le Net	FDJ–Suez	Cédrine Kerbaol	EF Education–Oatly
Germany	Franziska Koch	Team Picnic–PostNL	Antonia Niedermaier	Canyon//SRAM Zondacrypto
Greece	Argiro Milaki	Aromitalia Vaiano		
Guatemala			Jasmin Soto	Liro Sport - Arraz Casanare
Hong Kong			Sze Wing Lee	HKSI Pro Cycling Team
Hungary	Blanka Vas	Team SD Worx–Protime	Petra Zsankó	Ceratizit Pro Cycling
India	Kaveri Muranal		Kaur Jasmmek Sekhon	
Indonesia			Ayustina Delia Priatna	
Ireland	Mia Griffin	Roland Le Dévoluy	Kelly Murphy	
Iceland			Hafdís Sigurðardóttir	
Italy	Elisa Longo Borghini	UAE Team ADQ	Vittoria Guazzini	FDJ–Suez
Japan	Akari Kobayashi	MtD - Women's Elite Cycling Team		
Kazakhstan	Yelizaveta Sklyarova	Born to Win BTC City Ljubljana Zhiraf	Akpeiil Ossim	Sahand Pump Crown Tabriz
Latvia	Dana Rožlapa	Keukens Redant Cycling Team	Dana Rožlapa	Keukens Redant Cycling Team
Lesotho			Tsepiso Lerata	
Lithuania	Daiva Ragažinskienė		Skaistė Mikašauskaitė	
Luxembourg	Marie Schreiber	Team SD Worx–Protime	Marie Schreiber	Team SD Worx–Protime
Malaysia	Nurul Nabilah Mohd Asri	Nex Kedah Cycling Team	Ci Hui Nyo	
Mauritius	Kimberley Le Court	AG Insurance–Soudal	Kimberley Le Court	AG Insurance–Soudal
Namibia	Anri Krugel	Hollard Insurance	Anri Krugel	Hollard Insurance
Netherlands	Lorena Wiebes	Team SD Worx–Protime	Mischa Bredewold	Team SD Worx–Protime
New Zealand	Kim Cadzow	EF Education–Oatly	Kim Cadzow	EF Education–Oatly
Norway	Katrine Aalerud	Uno-X Mobility	Mie Bjørndal Ottestad	Uno-X Mobility
Pakistan	Rabia Garib		Rabia Garib	
Panama	Wendy Ducreux		Wendy Ducreux	
Paraguay	Araceli Jazmin Galeano		Araceli Jazmin Galeano	
Peru	Mariana Rojas		Romina Maribel Medrano	
Philippines	Kim Syrel Bonilla		Jermyn Prado	
Poland	Katarzyna Niewiadoma	Canyon//SRAM Zondacrypto	Agnieszka Skalniak-Sójka	Canyon//SRAM Zondacrypto
Portugal	Daniela Campos	Eneicat–CMTeam	Beatriz Roxo	Cantabria Deporte-Rio Miera
Romania	Manuela Mureșan	E.C. Mataró Skoda-Mogadealer Women's Team	Manuela Mureșan	E.C. Mataró Skoda-Mogadealer Women's Team
Rwanda	Djazilla Umwamikazi		Xaverine Nirere	
Serbia	Jelena Erić	Movistar Team	Iva Pavlović	
Singapore			Faye Foo	
Slovakia	Visma–Lease a Bike	Viktória Chladoňová	Visma–Lease a Bike	
Slovenia	Eugenia Bujak	Cofidis	Eugenia Bujak	Cofidis
South Africa	S'Annara Grove	CJ O'Shea Racing	Lucy Young	
South Korea	Jang Suji		Shin Jieung	
Spain	Sara Martín	Movistar Team	Mireia Benito	AG Insurance–Soudal
Sweden	Mika Söderström			
Switzerland	Steffi Häberlin	Team SD Worx–Protime	Marlen Reusser	Movistar Team
Taiwan	Huang Ting-ying		Huang Ting-ying	
Thailand	Phetdarin Somrat	Thailand Women's Cycling Team	Phetdarin Somrat	Thailand Women's Cycling Team
Turkey	Gamze Ceyhan		Reyhan Yakişir	
Uganda			Gamze Ceyhan	Black Mamba Development Squad
Ukraine	Yuliia Biriukova	Laboral Kutxa–Fundación Euskadi	Yuliia Biriukova	Laboral Kutxa–Fundación Euskadi
United Arab Emirates	Safia Al-Sayegh	UAE Team ADQ	Safia Al-Sayegh	UAE Team ADQ
United Kingdom	Millie Couzens	Fenix–Deceuninck	Zoe Bäckstedt	Canyon//SRAM Zondacrypto
United States	Kristen Faulkner	EF Education–Oatly	Emily Ehrlich	Virginia's Blue Ridge–TWENTY24
Uruguay	Malvina Prieto		Anabel Posse	
Uzbekistan	Shakhnoza Abdullaeva	OU7 Women Cycling Team	Yanina Kuskova	Laboral Kutxa–Fundación Euskadi
Venezuela			Lilibeth Chacón	
Zimbabwe	Helen Mitchell		Helen Mitchell	

==== Champions in UCI women's teams ====
UCI Women's Teams
Team	Road Race Champions	Time Trial Champions
AG Insurance–Soudal	Justine Ghekiere (BEL); Kimberley Le Court (MRI)	Mireia Benito (ESP); Kimberley Le Court (MRI)
Canyon//SRAM Zondacrypto	Katarzyna Niewiadoma (POL)	Zoe Bäckstedt (GBR); Antonia Niedermaier (GER); Agnieszka Skalniak-Sójka (POL)
Ceratizit Pro Cycling	Fariba Hashimi (AFG); Kristýna Burlová (CZE)	Fariba Hashimi (AFG); Petra Zsankó (HUN)
FDJ–Suez	Marie Le Net (FRA)	Vittoria Guazzini (ITA)
Fenix–Deceuninck	Millie Couzens (GBR)	Christina Schweinberger (AUT)
Human Powered Health	Kathrin Schweinberger (AUT)	
Lidl–Trek		
Liv AlUla Jayco	Lucinda Stewart (AUS)	
Movistar Team	Sara Martín (ESP); Jelena Erić (SRB)	Olivia Baril (CAN); Marlen Reusser (SUI)
Roland Le Dévoluy	Mia Griffin (IRL)	
Team Picnic–PostNL	Juliana Londoño (COL); Franziska Koch (GER)	
Team SD Worx–Protime	Blanka Vas (HUN); Marie Schreiber (LUX); Lorena Wiebes (NED); Steffi Häberlin (SUI)	Lotte Kopecky (BEL); Julia Kopecký (CZE); Marie Schreiber (LUX); Mischa Bredewold (NED)
Visma–Lease a Bike	Viktória Chladoňová (SVK)	Viktória Chladoňová (SVK)
UAE Team ADQ	Elisa Longo Borghini (ITA); Safia Al-Sayegh (UAE)	Brodie Chapman (AUS); Safia Al-Sayegh (UAE)
Uno-X Mobility	Alberte Greve (DEN); Anniina Ahtosalo (FIN); Mie Bjørndal Ottestad (NOR)	Rebecca Koerner (DEN); Anniina Ahtosalo (FIN); Katrine Aalerud (NOR)

UCI Women's ProTeams
Team	Road Race Champions	Time Trial Champions
Arkéa–B&B Hotels Women		
Cofidis	Eugenia Bujak (SLO)	Eugenia Bujak (SLO)
EF Education–Oatly	Kim Cadzow (NZL); Kristen Faulkner (USA)	Cédrine Kerbaol (FRA); Kim Cadzow (NZL)
Laboral Kutxa–Fundación Euskadi	Catalina Soto (CHI); Yuliia Biriukova (UKR)	Catalina Soto (CHI); Yuliia Biriukova (UKR); Yanina Kuskova (UZB)
St. Michel–Preference Home–Auber93		
VolkerWessels Women Cyclingteam		
Winspace Orange Seal		
