= Tour de Martinique =

Race details
- Date: July
- Region: Martinique, France
- English name: Tour of Martinique
- Discipline: Road
- Competition: UCI America Tour (former); National
- Type: Stage race
- Organiser: Regional Committee for Cycling in Martinique
- Web site: cyclismemartinique.com

History
- First edition: 1965
- Editions: 59 (as of 2026)
- First winner: Roger Martial (FRA)
- Most wins: Frédéric Delalande (FRA) (3 wins)
- Most recent: Nils Brun (SUI)

The Tour de Martinique is a multi-day road cycling race held annually in Martinique. First held in 1965, it was part of the UCI America Tour in 2005 and then from 2008 to 2011 as a 2.2 event.

== Winners ==
Year	Winner	Second	Third
1965	(France) Roger Martial
1966	(France) Sylvère Cabrera
1967	(France) Saturnin Molia
1968	(France) Bernard Doussaint
1969	(France) Romain Gueppois
1970	No race
1971	(France) Fernand Neror
1972	(France) Maurice Le Guilloux
1973	(France) Alfred Defontis
1974	(France) Pierre Touchefeu
1975	(France) Claire Valentin
1976	(France) Alain Heraud
1977	(France) Rémillien Bedard
1978	(France) Claire Valentin
1979	(France) Christian Merlot
1980	(France) Didier Leseaux
1981	(France) Eric Zubar
1982	(France) Jean-Michel Condette
1983	(Colombia) Herman Loaiza
1984	(Colombia) Carlos Emiro Gutiérrez
1985	(France) Philippe Montagnac
1986	(France) Pierre Rosalien
1987	(Colombia) Nelson Rodríguez
1988	(Colombia) Hernán Patiño
1989	(Venezuela) Hussein Monsalve
1990	(Austria) Erwin Hammerschmid
1991	(France) Frédéric Delalande
1992	(Cuba) Manuel Consuegra
1993	(France) Hugues Hierso
1994	(France) Frédéric Delalande
1995	(Cuba) Eliecer Valdés
1996	(Poland) Piotr Wadecki
1997	(Cuba) Eliecer Valdés
1998	(France) Rodrigue Lelamer
1999	(Switzerland) Reto Amsler
2000	(Australia) Cameron Hughes	(Trinidad and Tobago) Emile Abraham	(France) André Alexis
2001	(France) Jérôme Guisneuf	(France) Thibaut Humbert	(Japan) Koki Shimbo
2002	(France) Lionel Genthon	(France) Thibaut Humbert	(France) Christian Milesi
2003	(France) Willy Noyon	(France) Régis Maréchaux	(France) Mickael Verger
2004	(France) Hervé Arcade	(France) Régis Maréchaux	(France) Yvan Sartis
2005	(France) Frédéric Delalande	(United States) Stuart Gillespie	(France) Régis Maréchaux
2006	(United Kingdom) Jonathan Dayus	(France) Hervé Arcade	(Netherlands) Bart Oegema
2007	(France) Louis Teplier (Note: Louis Teplier was declared the winner after Colombians Carlo Rodríguez Ordoñez and Alexander Roa, initially first and second, were disqualified for doping.)
2008	(France) Willy Roseau	(France) Gwenaël Teillet	(France) Timothée Lefrançois
2009	(France) Timothée Lefrançois	(France) Anthony Vignes	(France) Christophe Diguet
2010	(Japan) Miyataka Shimizu	(France) Willy Roseau	(France) Yoann Michaud
2011	(France) Guillaume Malle	(France) Marc Flavien	(France) Boris Carène
2012	(France) Cédric Eustache (Note: Eustache was declared the winner after Alexander Budaragin was disqualified for testing positive for EPO.)	(Switzerland) Nico Brüngger
2013	(France) Camille Chancrin	(France) Martin Bouédo	(France) Marc Flavien
2014	(France) Cédric Eustache	(Colombia) Flober Peña	(France) Ludovic Turpin
2015	(France) Julien Liponne	(Venezuela) Jonathan Salinas	(France) Camille Chancrin
2016	(France) Yolan Sylvestre	(Venezuela) Ronald González	(France) Cédric Eustache
2017	(Venezuela) Jonathan Salinas	(France) Yolan Sylvestre	(France) Eddy Cadet-Marthe
2018	(France) Mickaël Stanislas	(France) Mickaël Laurent	(Colombia) Mario Rojas
2019	(Venezuela) Eduin Becerra	(France) Yolan Sylvestre	(France) Mickaël Stanislas
2020–2021	Cancelled
2022	(Colombia) Diego Soraca	(Estonia) Gert Kivistik	(France) Axel Carnier
2023	(France) Eddy-Michel Cadet-Marthe	(Colombia) Diego Soraca	(France) Benjamin Le Ny
2024	(France) Stefan Bennett	(France) Damien Urcel	(France) Jules Chatelon
2025	(France) Damien Urcel	(New Zealand) Noah Hollamby	(France) Stefan Bennett
2026	(Switzerland) Nils Brun	(France) Anthony Perez	(France) Damien Urcel
