= Jorge Abreu =

Venezuelan racing cyclist

Personal information
- Full name: Jorge Luis Abreu Soler
- Born: 16 March 1990 (age 36) San Antonio del Táchira, Venezuela

Cycling career
- Sport: Cycling
- Current team: MU Training–Pais Futuro; Doglocy–Imca
- Discipline: Road
- Role: Rider

Amateur teams
- 2014: Gobierno Bolivariano Tachira-IDT Concafe
- 2015–2017: Amo Táchira–Concafé
- 2017: JB Ropa Deportiva
- 2018: Kino Táchira
- 2019: Triple Táchira
- 2020–2021: Team Atlético Venezuela
- 2022: Venezuela Pais Futuro
- 2023: Lotería del Táchira
- 2024: Club Politachira
- 2025: MU Training–Pais Futuro
- 2025: Doglocy–Imca
- 2026–: Fina Arroz CES Multimarcas Bancamiga
Medal record
Men's track cycling
Representing Venezuela
Central American and Caribbean Games
Bronze medal – third place	2026 Santo Domingo	Team pursuit

Jorge Luis Abreu Soler (born 16 March 1990) is a Venezuelan cyclist, who currently rides for club teams MU Training–Pais Futuro and Doglocy–Imca.

== Major results ==
2011
4th Road race, National Road Championships
2012
3rd Road race, National Under-23 Road Championships
2014
5th Time trial, National Road Championships
5th Overall Vuelta al Táchira
6th Overall Vuelta a Venezuela

1st Stage 4

2015
7th Overall Vuelta al Táchira
2016
2nd Overall Vuelta al Táchira

1st Points classification

2017
4th Overall Vuelta Independencia Nacional

1st Mountains classification

2018
1st Stage 5 Vuelta al Táchira
2020
8th Overall Vuelta al Táchira
2021
1st Overall Vuelta a Venezuela

1st Mountains classification

2022
4th Overall Vuelta al Táchira
4th Overall Vuelta a Venezuela
2023
2nd Overall Vuelta a Bramón

1st Stage 3

2024
9th Overall Vuelta al Táchira
2025
1st Mountains classification, Vuelta a Venezuela
2nd Overall Vuelta al Táchira
2026
1st Overall Vuelta al Táchira

1st Points classification
1st Stage 4
