= Edwin Sánchez (cyclist) =

Colombian cyclist

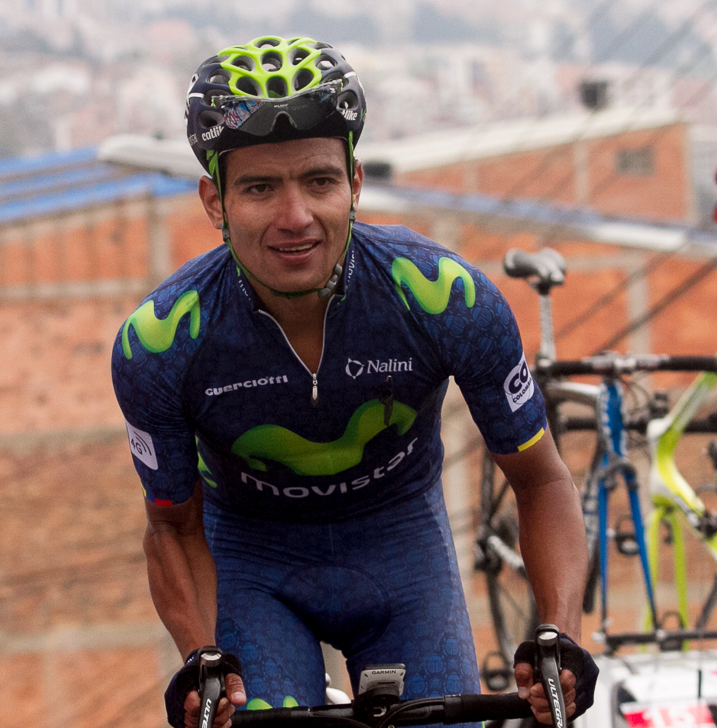

Personal information
- Full name: Edwin Sánchez Anzola
- Nickname: Pinpín
- Born: 20 July 1983 (age 43) Caparrapi, Colombia

Cycling career
- Sport: Cycling
- Current team: Aguardiente Néctar–IMRD–Chía–Cundinamarca
- Discipline: Road
- Role: Rider

Amateur teams
- 2014: Formesan-Bogotá Humana
- 2015: EBSA-Indeportes Boyacá
- 2018–2019: Carène Cycling Développement
- 2020–: Aguardiente Néctar–IMRD–Chía–Cundinamarca

Professional team
- 2016–2017: Movistar Team América

Edwin Sánchez Anzola (born 20 July 1983 in Caparrapi) is a Colombian cyclist, who currently rides for Aguardiente Néctar–IMRD–Chía–Cundinamarca.

== Major results ==
2007
3rd Overall Tour de Guadeloupe

1st Mountains classification
1st Stage 6

2008
3rd Overall Tour de Guadeloupe
2009
3rd Overall Tour de Guadeloupe
2010
3rd Overall Tour de Guadeloupe

1st Stage 8b

2013
1st Overall Vuelta a la Independencia Nacional
2014
1st Overall Vuelta a la Independencia Nacional
2015
1st Stage 4 Vuelta a Colombia
2018
1st Stage 7 Tour de Guadeloupe
2019
7th Overall Tour de Guadeloupe
2021
5th Overall Tour de Guadeloupe
