= Saint Vincent and the Grenadines National Cycling Championships =

Flag of Saint Vincent and the Grenadines

The Saint Vincent and the Grenadines National Cycling Championships are held annually, and cover both the individual time trial and road race disciplines.

== Road Race ==
=== Men ===
Year	Gold	Silver	Bronze
2011	Deptor Culzac		
2012	Ramiro Chen		
2013	Oneil George		
2014			
2015	Cammie Adams		
2016	Zefal Bailey		
2017			
2018	Daniel Zhao		
2019	Zefal Bailey		
2020	Antonio Richardson		
2021	Cammie Adams		
2022	Cammie Adams		

=== Women ===
Year	Gold	Silver	Bronze
2022	Amber Glasgow		
2023	Kristin Doak		

== Time Trial ==
=== Men ===
Year	Gold	Silver	Bronze
2016	Zefal Bailey		
2017			
2018	Daniel Zhao		
2019			
2020	Zefal Bailey		
2021	Cammie Adams		
2022	Cammie Adams		

=== Women ===
Year	Gold	Silver	Bronze
2022	Amber Glasgow		

== See also ==
- National road cycling championships
