= Carlos Gálviz =

Venezuelan cyclist

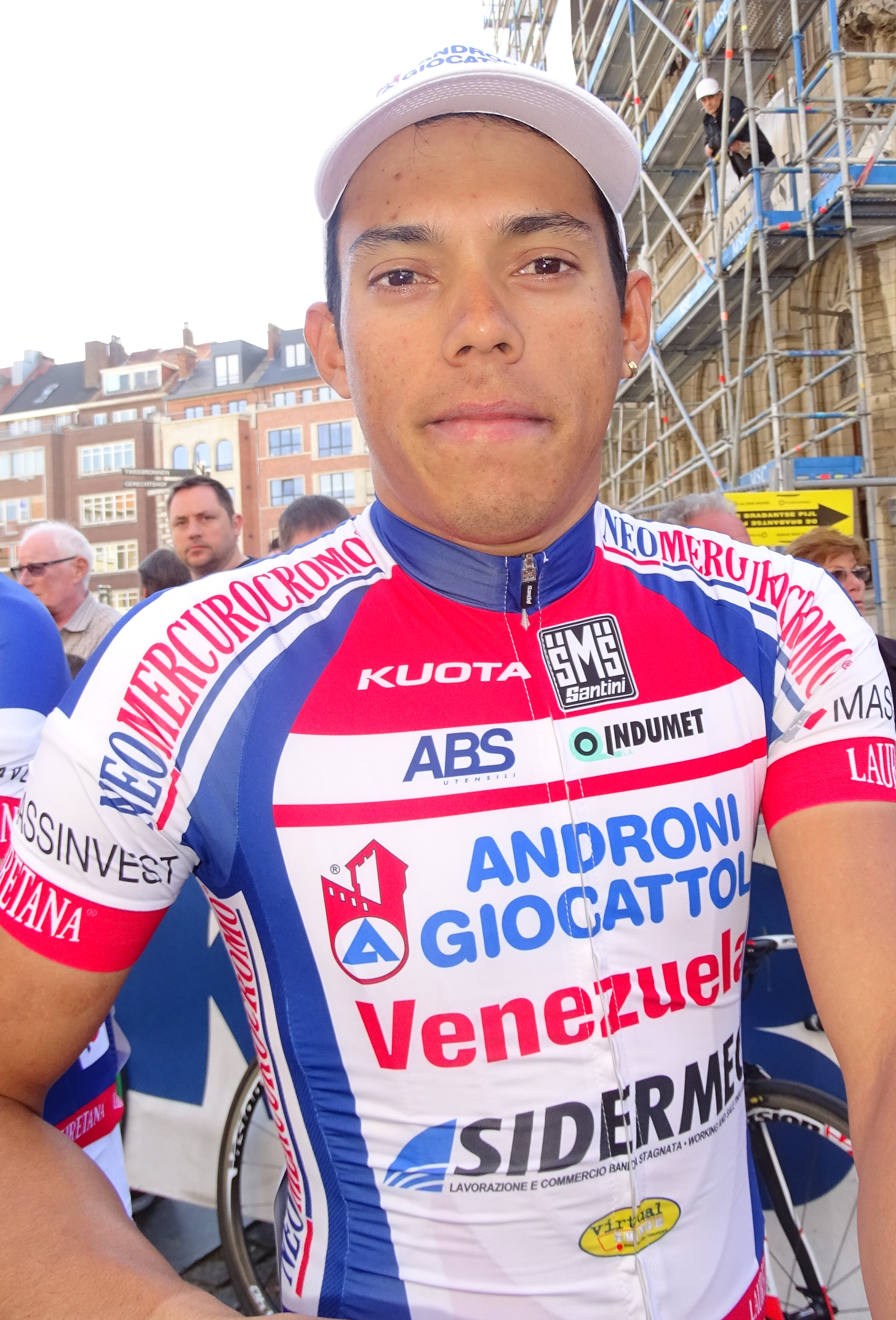
- Gálviz in 2015.

Personal information
- Born: 27 October 1989 (age 36) Venezuela
- Height: 1.75 m (5 ft 9 in)
- Weight: 65 kg (143 lb)

Cycling career
- Sport: Cycling
- Current team: Best PC Ecuador
- Discipline: Road
- Role: Rider

Amateur teams
- 2016: JHS Aves–Intac.Tachira
- 2018: Deportivo Táchira
- 2018–2019: JB Ropa Deportiva
- 2020–2021: Deportivo Tachira–JHS

Professional teams
- 2011–2012: Movistar Continental Team
- 2014: Start–Trigon Cycling Team
- 2014–2015: Androni Giocattoli–Venezuela
- 2022–: Movistar–Best PC

Carlos Gálviz (born 27 October 1989) is a Venezuelan racing cyclist, who currently rides for UCI Continental team Best PC Ecuador. He rode at the 2014 UCI Road World Championships in the road race. In 2014, he was the national individual time trial champion of Venezuela.

== Major results ==
2008
8th Overall Doble Sucre Potosí GP Cemento Fancesa
10th Overall Vuelta al Táchira
2009
2nd Time trial, National Road Championships
2010
2nd Overall Vuelta a Bolivia
4th Overall Vuelta a Guatemala

1st Stage 12 (ITT)

5th Overall Vuelta a Venezuela
7th Overall Vuelta al Táchira
2012
3rd Time trial, National Road Championships
8th Overall Vuelta al Táchira
10th Overall Vuelta del Uruguay
2013
2nd Time trial, National Road Championships
3rd Overall Vuelta al Táchira
2014
Central American and Caribbean Games

1st Road race
8th Time trial

1st Time trial, National Road Championships
1st Overall Vuelta al Táchira
2nd Overall Vuelta a Venezuela

1st Stage 6

4th Overall Vuelta a la Independencia Nacional

1st Stage 5

7th Time trial, Pan American Road Championships
9th Time trial, South American Games
2015
6th Overall Vuelta al Táchira

1st Stage 5

10th Time trial, Pan American Road Championships
2018
2nd Time trial, National Road Championships
8th Overall Vuelta a Venezuela
2019
2nd Time trial, National Road Championships
2nd Overall Vuelta a Venezuela
2nd Overall Vuelta a Miranda
2020
1st Time trial, National Road Championships
10th Overall Vuelta al Táchira
