= Alexis Méndez =

Venezuelan cyclist

Personal information
- Full name: Alexis Omar Méndez
- Born: 23 October 1969 (age 56) Táriba, Cárdenas, Venezuela

Cycling career
- Sport: Cycling
- Current team: Retired
- Disciplines: Road; Track

Amateur teams
- 1990: Lotería del Táchira
- 1991: Selle Italia–Vetta
- 1994: Lotería del Táchira

Alexis Omar Méndez (born 23 October 1969) is a retired male professional track and road racing cyclist from Venezuela. He competed for his native country twice at the Summer Olympics: 1988 and 2000.

== Major results ==
1986
Central American and Caribbean Games

3rd Points race
3rd Team pursuit

1989
1st Overall Tour de Guadeloupe
1990
3rd Overall Vuelta al Táchira
3rd Overall Tour de Guadeloupe
1991
3rd Road race, National Road Championships
1993
2nd Overall Tour de Guadeloupe
3rd Road race, National Road Championships
1994
1st Overall Vuelta al Táchira
1st Overall Vuelta al Estado Zulia
1996
1st Overall Clásico Virgen de la Consolación de Táriba
1998
2nd Individual pursuit, Central American and Caribbean Games
3rd Road race, National Road Championships
9th Overall Vuelta al Táchira

1st Stage 10

1999
3rd Road race, National Road Championships
2000
1st Overall Vuelta a la Independencia Nacional

1st Stages 4b & 7b

2nd Time trial, National Road Championships
2001
1st Stage 10 Vuelta al Táchira
1st Stage 4 Vuelta a Venezuela
