= Yonder Godoy =

Venezuelan cyclist (born 1993)

Personal information
- Full name: Yonder Eduardo Godoy
- Born: 19 April 1993 (age 33) Portuguesa, Venezuela
- Height: 1.67 m (5 ft 6 in)
- Weight: 64 kg (141 lb)

Cycling career
- Sport: Cycling
- Current team: Gobernación de Trujillo
- Discipline: Road
- Role: Rider

Amateur teams
- 2016: Fedeindustria–Gobernación de Yaracuy
- 2022: Indet Trujillo
- 2023–: Gobernación de Trujillo

Professional teams
- 2013–2015: Androni Giocattoli–Venezuela
- 2016–2017: Wilier Triestina–Southeast
- 2019: Inteja Imca–Ridea

Major wins
- National Time Trial Championships (2015)

Yonder Eduardo Godoy (born 19 April 1993) is a Venezuelan racing cyclist, who rides for the Venezuelan amateur team Gobernación de Trujillo. He rode in the 2014 Giro d'Italia.

== Major results ==
2013
National Under-23 Road Championships

1st Road race
1st Time trial

3rd Time trial, Bolivarian Games
10th Overall Okolo Slovenska
2014
1st Time trial, National Under-23 Road Championships
4th Time trial, South American Games
8th Overall Vuelta a Venezuela

1st Young rider classification

9th Overall Volta de Ciclismo Internacional do Estado de São Paulo
2015
1st Time trial, National Road Championships
10th Time trial, Pan American Games
2016
2nd Overall Tour of Taihu Lake
6th Coppa Ugo Agostoni
2017
6th Overall Tour of Turkey
2022
10th Overall Clásico RCN
2023
4th Overall Vuelta al Táchira

1st Points classification
1st Stage 6

=== Grand Tour general classification results timeline ===
Grand Tour	2014
Giro d'Italia	76
Tour de France	—
Vuelta a España	—

Legend
—	Did not compete
DNF	Did not finish
