= Freddy Vargas (cyclist) =

Venezuelan cyclist

Personal information
- Full name: Freddy Vargas Castellanos
- Born: 11 October 1982 (age 44) Mucuchíes, Venezuela

Cycling career
- Sport: Cycling
- Current team: Lotería del Táchira
- Discipline: Road
- Role: Rider
- Rider type: Sprinter

Amateur teams
- 2006–2010: Lotería del Táchira
- 2012–2016: Kino Táchira
- 2016: Gobierno de Yaracuy–Cavebici
- 2017: Gobernación de Mérida–Fundarujano
- 2018–: Lotería del Táchira

Freddy Vargas Castellanos (born October 11, 1982 in Mucuchíes) is a Venezuelan road cyclist.

== Career ==
2002
1st Overall Vuelta al Táchira

1st Stage 4

2003
1st Stage 7 Vuelta al Táchira
1st Young rider Classification Vuelta a Venezuela
2005
1st Stage 3 Tour de la Guadeloupe
2007
1st Stage 7 Vuelta al Táchira
1st Overall Clásico Virgen de la Consolación de Táriba
1st Stage 3 Clasico Ciclistico Banfoandes
2008
1st Stage 5 Vuelta a Trujillo
3rd Overall Vuelta a Venezuela
2009
1st Stage 3 Vuelta a Trujillo
2012
1st Stage 5 Vuelta al Táchira
