= Tour de Guadeloupe =

Race details
- Date: July/August
- Region: Guadeloupe
- Local name(s): • Tour cycliste international de la Guadeloupe (in French) • International cycling tour of Guadeloupe (in English)
- Discipline: Road race
- Competition: UCI America Tour; UCI Europe Tour
- Type: Stage race
- Organiser: Comité régional de cyclisme de la Guadeloupe
- Web site: letour-guadeloupe.fr

History
- First edition: 1948
- Editions: 75 (as of 2026)
- First winner: Robert Carlos (GLP)
- Most wins: José Daniel Bernal (COL); Flober Peña (COL) (4 wins)
- Most recent: Owen Cole (USA)

The Tour de Guadeloupe (French pronunciation: [tuʁ də ɡwad(ə)lup]; English: Tour of Guadeloupe) is an annual men's multiple stage road bicycle race held each August in the French Caribbean island of Guadeloupe.

Founded in 1948 under the name Tour Cycliste de la Guadeloupe, this elite men's competition opened officially to overseas racers in 1979, changing its name to Tour Cycliste international de la Guadeloupe. Covering a majority of the island's territory, the race includes today a prologue time trial and eight to nine stages.

For 2005 to 2012, 2014, and in 2021, the race was part of the UCI America Tour, which is one of six UCI Continental Circuits ruled by the Union Cycliste Internationale, the international governing body for cycling. Since then, the race has been rated as a 2.2 event on the Union Cycliste Internationale (UCI) classification standards. In 2013, from 2015 to 2020 and since 2022, the race has been on the UCI Europe Tour calendar.

This event is organized by the Comité régional de cyclisme de la Guadeloupe (en: Regional cycling committee of Guadeloupe).

== History of Results ==
=== Top Three as of 2.2 UCI race classification (since 2005) ===
Year	Overall Winner	Second	Third
2026	Owen Cole (USA)	Clément Sanchez (FRA)	Colin Stüssi (SUI)
2025	Andrés Ardila (COL)	Stefan Bennett (FRA)	Axel Taillandier (FRA)
2024	Kevin Castillo (COL)	Sebastián Castaño (COL)	Sam Maisonobe (FRA)
2023	Benjamin Le Ny (FRA)	Esneider Báez (COL)	Tyler Stites (USA)
2022	Stefan Bennett (FRA)	Tom Donnenwirth (FRA)	Célestin Guillon (FRA)
2021	Stefan Bennett (FRA)	Luis Mora (VEN)	Clément Braz Afonso (FRA)
2020	Cancelled		
2019	Adrien Guillonnet (FRA)	Vadim Pronskiy (KAZ)	Frederik Dombrowski (GER)
2018	Boris Carène (FRA)	Francisco Mancebo (SPA)	Yonathan Salinas (VEN)
2017	Sébastien Fournet-Fayard (FRA)	Juan Murillo (VEN)	Žydrūnas Savickas (LTU)
2016	Damien Monier (FRA)	Maxime Le Lavandier (FRA)	José Chacón Díaz (VEN)
2015	Boris Carène (FRA)	Diego Milán (DOM)	Antonio Pedrero (ESP)
2014	John Nava (VEN)	Damien Monier (FRA)	Juan Murillo (VEN)
2013	Pierre Lebreton (FRA)	José Chacón Díaz (VEN)	Miyataka Shimizu (JPN)
2012	Ludovic Turpin (FRA)	Bruno Langlois (CAN)	Junya Sano (JPN)
2011	Boris Carène (GLP)	Klaas Sys (BEL)	Carter Jones (USA)
2010	Francisco Mancebo (ESP)	Boris Carène (GLP)	Edwin Sánchez (COL)
2009	Nicolas Dumont (FRA)	Miguel Ubeto (VEN)	Edwin Sánchez (COL)
2008	Flober Peña (COL)	Cameron Evans (CAN)	Edwin Sánchez (COL)
2007	Flober Peña (COL)	Nicolas Dumont (FRA)	Edwin Sánchez (COL)
2006	Martin Prázdnovský (SVK)	José Daniel Bernal (COL)	Andrey Mizourov (KAZ)
2005	Flober Peña (COL)	José Daniel Bernal (COL)	Alexander Mironov (RUS)

=== Amateur winners (1948-2004) ===
Year	Overall Winner	Second	Third
2004	Flober Peña (COL)	Miguel Armando Ubeto (VEN)	Nicolas Dumont (FRA)
2003	José Daniel Bernal (COL)	Hugo Ferney (COL)	Flober Peña (COL)
2002	Frédéric Delalande (FRA)	José Daniel Bernal (COL)	Rodolfo Camacho (COL)
2001	Rodolfo Camacho (COL)	Carlos José Ochoa (VEN)	José Daniel Bernal (COL)
2000	José Daniel Bernal (COL)	Julian Winn (GBR)	Flober Peña (COL)
1999	José Daniel Bernal (COL)	Vincent Klaes (FRA)	Lionel Lorgeou (FRA)
1998	Régis Balandraud (FRA)	Ghislain Marty (FRA)	José Daniel Bernal (COL)
1997	Philippe Mauduit (FRA)	Jose Ismael Sarmiento (COL)	Alvaro Sierra (COL)
1996	Walter Bénéteau (FRA)	Raúl Gómez (COL)	Frédéric Mainguenaud (FRA)
1995	José Daniel Bernal (COL)	Christian Blanchard (FRA)	Mickael Pichon (FRA)
1994	José Castelblanco (COL)	Walter Bénéteau (FRA)	Peter Longbottom (GBR)
1993	Julio César Aguirre (COL)	Alexis Méndez (VEN)	Alekandras Ivanovas (LTU)
1992	Adolfo Rico (COL)	Jens Voigt (GER)	Jair Humberto Bernal (COL)
1991	Molière Gène (GLP) Anse-Bertrand	Henry Ortiz (COL)	Erwin Thijs (BEL)
1990	Robinson Merchán (VEN)	André Alexis (FRA)	Alexis Méndez (VEN)
1989	Alexis Méndez (VEN)	Jesús Torres (VEN)	Marco Masetti (ITA)
1988	Leonardo Sierra Sepulveda (VEN)	Jose Villamizar (VEN)	Enrique Campos (VEN)
1987	Jesús Torres (VEN)	Rosalien Pierre (GLP)	Luis Saavedra (URU)
1986	Alberto Camargo (COL)	Eric Zubar (GLP)	Gilles Faury (FRA)
1985	Eric Zubar (GLP) (Note: In 1985, winner Richard Méthony was disqualified for doping. Eric Zubar, second in overall rankings, was declared new winner of the 1985 edition of the Tour of Guadeloupe.) Sainte-Rose	Rosalien Pierre (GLP)	Maurice Amos (GLP)
1984	Julio César Cadena (COL)	Richard Methony (GLP)	Luc Morand (FRA)
1983	Argemiro Bohórquez (COL)	Luc Morand (FRA)	Roger Jeannette (FRA)
1982	Pablo Wilches (COL)	Luc Morand (FRA)	André Massard (SUI)
1981	Mike Gutmann (SUI)	Francisco Rodriguez Maldonado (COL)	Luc Morand (FRA)
1980	Rosalien Pierre (GLP) Le Gosier		
1979	Humbert Aristé (GLP) Lamentin	Jean-Pierre Henrard (BEL)	Guy Janiszewski (BEL)
1978	Valentin Claire (GLP) Abymes	Gregorio Aldo Arencibia Guerra (CUB)	Charles Firpion (FRA)
1977	Valentin Claire (GLP) Abymes	Piero Civino (ITA)	Rolando Cartaya (CUB)
1976	Louis Coquelin (FRA)	Alain Budet (FRA)	Jean-Michel Avril (FRA)
1975	Robert Charles (GLP) Lamentin	Valentin Claire (GLP)	Alain Mayoute (GLP)
1974	Jacques Imbrogno (FRA)		
1973	Jacques Martinez (FRA)		
1972	Francisco Triana (COL)		
1971	Gérard Annequin (FRA)		
1970	Régis Ovion (FRA)	Alain Pauline (GLP)	Saturnin Molia (GLP) Lamentin
1969	Saturnin Molia (GLP) Lamentin		
1968	No Race		
1967	Alain Pauline (GLP) Petit-Canal		
1966	Alain Pauline (GLP) Petit-Canal	Roger Bordelais (GLP)	
1965	No Race		
1964	Sylvère Cabrera (GLP) Basse-Terre		
1963	No Race		
1962	André Seidler (FRA)		
1961	Jean Arze (FRA)		
1960	Robert Bolus (GLP)	Erman Thésin (GLP)	Samson Mayoute (GLP)
1959	Robert Bolus (GLP) Petit-Bourg	Gilbert Gibrien (GLP)	Sonore Ursule (GLP) Abymes
1958	Richard Bernard (GLP) A-Bertrand	Sonore Ursule (GLP) Abymes	Erman Thésin (GLP)
1957	Sonore Ursule (GLP) Abymes	Erman Thésin (GLP)	Denis Bordelais (GLP)
1956	Maxime Benuffe (GLP) Le Moule	Jules Houillier (GLP)	Pierre Antoine (GLP)
1955	René Cock (GLP) Abymes	Denis Bordelais (GLP)	Jules Houillier (GLP)
1954	Maxime Benuffe (GLP) Le Moule	Pierre Antoine (GLP)	Alceste Farescour (GLP) P-Bourg
1953	Alceste Farescour (GLP) P-Bourg	Pierre Antoine (GLP)	Audibert Nanette (GLP)
1952	Camille Daridan (GLP) M-à-L'E	Maxime Carlosse (GLP) A-Bertrand	Edouard Ursule (GLP)
1951	Camille Daridan (GLP) M-à-L'E	Jules Houillier (GLP)	Thierry Michineau (GLP)
1950	Maxime Carlosse (GLP) A-Bertrand	Robert Carlosse (GLP) A-Bertrand	Lucien Peston (GLP)
1949	Maxime Carlosse (GLP) A-Bertrand	Robert Carlosse (GLP) A-Bertrand	Edouard Ursule (GLP)
1948	Robert Carlosse (GLP) A-Bertrand	Justin Dupalan (GLP)	Edouard Ursule (GLP)
