= Tour du Jura (France) =

Cycling race in France

Race details
- Date: May-June
- Region: France
- Discipline: Road race
- Competition: UCI Europe Tour
- Type: Stage race (2003–2019); One-day race (2021–)
- Organiser: Jura Cyclisme Pays du Revermont
- Web site: www.tourdujura.com

History
- First edition: 2003
- Editions: 23 (as of 2026)
- First winner: Xavier Pache (SWI)
- Most wins: No repeat winners
- Most recent: Matthew Riccitello (USA)

The Tour du Jura is a road bicycle race held annually in France. It was organized as a 2.2 event on the UCI Europe Tour until 2021 when it became a one-day race and upgraded to 1.1 status.

== Winners ==
Year	Country	Rider	Team
2003	Switzerland	Xavier Pache	
2004	France	Florian Courrège	
2005	France	Franck Bucci	
2006	France	Jean-Charles Sénac	Chambéry CF
2007	France	Baptiste Fuchs	
2008	France	Damien Favre-Félix	
2009	France	Sébastien Gredy	
2010	France	Émilien Viennet	CC Étupes
2011	France	Yoann Michaud	
2012	France	Laurent Colombatto	
2013	France	Erwan Brenterch	
2014	France	Sébastien Fournet-Fayard	Pro Immo Nicolas Roux
2015	France	Pierre Bonnet	Pro Immo Nicolas Roux
2016	France	Léo Vincent	CC Étupes
2017	Belgium	Thomas Degand	Wanty–Groupe Gobert
2018	Norway	Carl Fredrik Hagen	Joker Icopal
2019	Belgium	Kobe Goossens	Lotto–Soudal U23
2021	France	Benoît Cosnefroy	AG2R Citroën Team
2022	Australia	Ben O'Connor	AG2R Citroën Team
2023	France	Kévin Vauquelin	Arkéa–Samsic
2024	France	David Gaudu	Groupama–FDJ
2025	France	Guillaume Martin	Groupama–FDJ
2026	United States	Matthew Riccitello	Decathlon CMA CGM
