= Orluis Aular =

Venezuelan cyclist (born 1996)

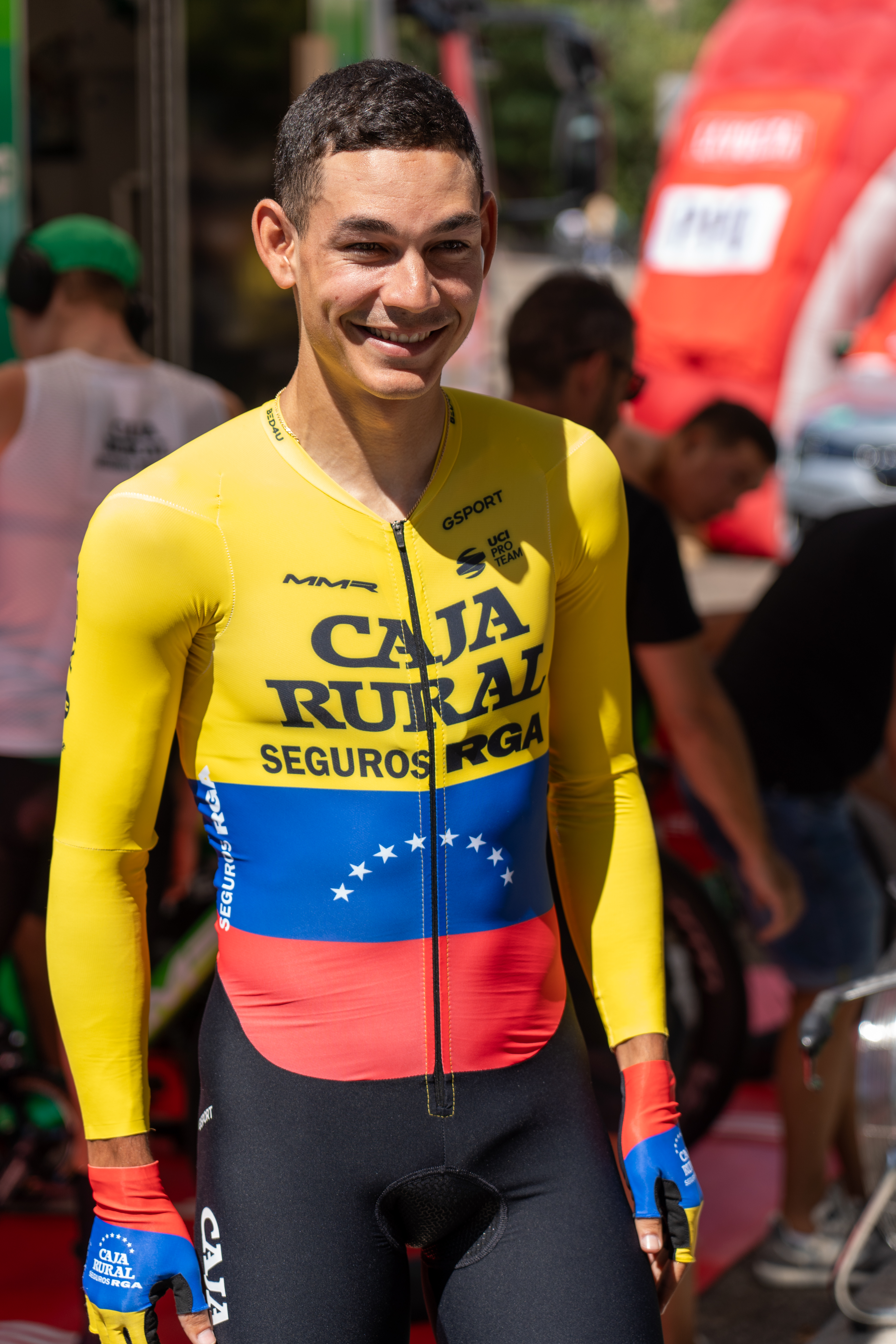
- Aular at the 2023 Vuelta a España

Personal information
- Full name: Orluis Alberto Aular Sanabria
- Born: 5 November 1996 (age 29) Nirgua, Yaracuy, Venezuela
- Height: 1.76 m (5 ft 9 in)
- Weight: 65 kg (143 lb)

Cycling career
- Sport: Cycling
- Current team: Movistar Team
- Discipline: Road
- Role: Rider
- Rider type: Sprinter, puncheur

Amateur teams
- 2015–2016: Gobernación de Yaracuy AGV
- 2017: EC Cartucho.es
- 2018: Banco Bicentenario; Gobierno de Yaracuy
- 2018–2019: Gobernación de Miranda–Trek

Professional teams
- 2017–2018: Start–Vaxes Cycling Team
- 2019: Matrix Powertag
- 2020–2024: Caja Rural–Seguros RGA
- 2025–: Movistar Team

Major wins
- One-day races and Classics National Road Race Championships (2022, 2023, 2025) National Time Trial Championships (2019, 2022, 2023, 2024, 2025)
Medal record
Men's road bicycle racing
Representing Venezuela
Pan American Championships
Bronze medal – third place	2022 San Juan	Time trial
Bronze medal – third place	2024 São José dos Campos	Time trial

Orluis Alberto Aular Sanabria (born 5 November 1996) is a Venezuelan cyclist, who currently rides for UCI WorldTeam Movistar Team.

Aular participated in the 2023 Vuelta a España. After finishing in sixth place on Stage 4, he finished as runner-up on Stage 7, losing out to Geoffrey Soupe on a photo finish.

== Major results ==
2014
1st Road race, National Junior Road Championships
2016
1st Stage 1 Vuelta al Táchira
2018
1st Stage 10 Vuelta a Venezuela
2019 (1 pro win)
National Road Championships

1st Time trial
2nd Road race

1st Overall Vuelta a Venezuela

1st Points classification
1st Mountains classification
1st Stages 2, 3, 4, 5 (ITT) & 6

1st Overall Tour de Kumano

1st Points classification
1st Stage 1

Vuelta al Táchira

1st Points classification
1st Stage 3

2nd Overall Tour de Tochigi
6th Time trial, Pan American Games
9th Overall Vuelta a Miranda

1st Points classification
1st Stages 2 & 6

10th Japan Cup
2020
1st Overall Vuelta a Venezuela
National Road Championships

3rd Road race
3rd Time trial

2022 (2)
South American Games

1st Road race
4th Time trial

National Road Championships

1st Road race
1st Time trial

1st Overall Volta ao Alentejo

1st Points classification
1st Stages 1 & 4 (ITT)

1st Clássica da Arrábida
1st Points classification, Boucles de la Mayenne
Pan American Championships

3rd Time trial
10th Road race

Bolivarian Games

4th Road race
4th Time trial

6th Vuelta a Murcia
2023 (4)
Central American and Caribbean Games

1st Road race
4th Time trial

National Road Championships

1st Road race
1st Time trial

1st Overall CRO Race

1st Stage 5

1st Overall Volta ao Alentejo

1st Points classification

1st Clássica da Arrábida
4th Grand Prix du Morbihan
Pan American Games

6th Road race
7th Time trial

2024 (3)
1st Time trial, National Road Championships
1st Trofeo Matteotti
2nd Overall Tour du Limousin

1st Stage 1

Pan American Championships

3rd Time trial
4th Road race

8th Vuelta a Castilla y León
8th Coppa Sabatini
8th Prueba Villafranca de Ordizia
2025 (2)
National Road Championships

1st Road race
1st Time trial

7th Overall Tour of Belgium
10th Clásica de Almería
2026
3rd Coppa Bernocchi
6th Dwars door Vlaanderen

=== Grand Tour general classification results timeline ===
Grand Tour	2023
Giro d'Italia	—
Tour de France	—
Vuelta a España	DNF
