= Jimmi Briceño =

Venezuelan bicycle racer

Personal information
- Full name: Jimmi José Briceño Castro
- Born: 15 April 1986 (age 40) Barinas, Venezuela

Cycling career
- Sport: Cycling
- Current team: Loteria del Táchira–Concafé Bandes
- Discipline: Road
- Role: Rider

Amateur teams
- 2011: Kino Drodinica
- 2012–2014: Lotería del Táchira
- 2016: JHS Aves–Intac. Táchira
- 2017: JHS Grupo-Andiempaques
- 2018: Inversiones Alexander–Labcare–Ferlab
- 2019: La Viña–Grupo MG–Ferlab–Inversiones Alexander
- 2019: Deportivo Táchira
- 2020–: Loteria del Táchira–Concafé Bandes

Professional team
- 2017: China Continental Team of Gansu Bank

Jimmi José Briceño Castro (born 15 April 1986) is a Venezuelan road cyclist.

He was suspended for doping for the 2014 and 2015 seasons.

== Major results ==
2007
10th Vuelta a Venezuela

1st Young rider classification

2008
1st Stage Vuelta a Trujillo
2010
1st Overall Vuelta a Trujillo

1st Stages 1 & 3

1st Stage 11 Vuelta al Táchira
2011
1st Stage 4 Vuelta a Trujillo
5th Overall Vuelta Ciclista Chiapas
8th Overall Vuelta a Bolivia
2012
1st Overall Vuelta al Táchira

1st Points classification
1st Stage 8

2017
2nd Overall Vuelta al Táchira

1st Stage 9

2019
1st Overall Vuelta al Táchira

1st Stage 6

2020
5th Overall Vuelta al Táchira
2023
6th Overall Vuelta al Táchira
2024
1st Stage 2 Vuelta al Táchira
