= Pedro Gutiérrez =

Venezuelan cyclist

Personal information
- Full name: Pedro António Gutiérrez Daza
- Born: 8 August 1989 (age 37)

Cycling career
- Sport: Cycling
- Discipline: Road
- Role: Rider

Amateur teams
- 2009: Hussein Sport de Barinas
- 2010–2013: Gobernación del Zulia
- 2014: Gobernación de Carabobo
- 2015–2017: Kino Táchira
- 2018: Banco Bicentenario–Gob.Yaracuy
- 2019: Gobernación de Miranda–Trek

Professional team
- 2018: Qinghai Tianyoude Cycling Team

Pedro António Gutíerrez Daza (born 8 August 1989) is a Venezuelan cyclist, who last rode for Venezuelan amateur team Gobernación de Miranda–Trek.

== Major results ==
2009
2nd Time trial, National Under-23 Road Championships
2010
3rd Road race, National Under-23 Road Championships
2011
1st Overall Vuelta a Venezuela
9th Overall Vuelta Independencia Nacional
2013
3rd Time trial, National Road Championships
2016
1st Time trial, National Road Championships
1st Stage 6 Vuelta a Venezuela
2017
1st Time trial, National Road Championships
1st Stage 9 Vuelta a Venezuela
2018
1st Time trial, National Road Championships
1st Overall Vuelta al Táchira

1st Stage 2

2019
10th Overall Vuelta a Venezuela
