= Wilmarys Moreno =

Venezuelan cyclist

Personal information
- Full name: Wilmarys Del Valle Moreno Duran
- Born: 16 May 1993 (age 33) Venezuela

Cycling career
- Sport: Cycling
- Discipline: Road
- Role: Rider

Major wins
- One day races & Classics National Time Trial Championships (2019, 2021) National Road Race Championships (2019, 2021)

Wilmarys Del Valle Moreno Duran (born 16 May 1993) is a Venezuelan racing cyclist. Moreno won both the Venezuelan National Time Trial Championships and the Venezuelan National Road Race Championships in 2019 and 2021.

== Major results ==
2010
2nd Road race, National Junior Road Championships
2011
1st Road race, National Junior Road Championships
2012
6th Road race, National Road Championships
6th Copa Federacion Venezolana de Ciclismo Corre
7th Clasico Aniversario De La Federacion Veneolana
2013
9th Road race, National Road Championships
2014
National Road Championships

3rd Road race
3rd Time trial

7th Time trial, Central American and Caribbean Games
9th Clasico FVCiclismo Corre Por la VIDA
2015
National Road Championships

2nd Road race
2nd Time trial

4th Copa Federación Venezolana de Ciclismo
10th Clasico FVCiclismo Corre Por la VIDA
2016
3rd Copa Federación Venezolana de Ciclismo
5th Road race, Pan American Road Championships
2017
5th Road race, National Road Championships
2018
National Road Championships

2nd Road race
2nd Time trial

8th Road race, South American Games
2019
National Road Championships

1st Road race
1st Time trial

5th Overall Tour Femenino de Venezuela II
7th Road race, Pan American Games
8th Tour Femenino de Venezuela I
2020
3rd Time trial, National Road Championships
2021
National Road Championships

1st Road race
1st Time trial

2022
National Road Championships

3rd Time trial
5th Road race

6th Road race, South American Games
2023
3rd Road race, National Road Championships
10th Road Race, Central American and Caribbean Games
