= Yonathan Salinas =

Venezuelan cyclist (born 1990)

Personal information
- Full name: Yonathan Jesús Salinas Duque
- Born: 31 May 1990 (age 36) Rubio, Venezuela

Cycling career
- Sport: Cycling
- Discipline: Road
- Role: Rider

Amateur teams
- 2009–2013: Lotería del Táchira
- 2014–2017: Kino Táchira–Royal Bike
- 2018: Lotería del Táchira
- 2019: Uni Sport Lamentinois
- 2020: Deportivo Tachira–JHS
- 2021: Team Atletico Venezuela

Yonathan Jesús Salinas Duque (born 31 May 1990 in Rubio, Venezuela) is a Venezuelan cyclist, who most recently rode for Venezuelan amateur team Atletico Venezuela.

== Major results ==
2012
1st Young rider classification Vuelta al Táchira
2013
Vuelta a Bolivia

1st Stages 1 & 9b (ITT)

3rd Road race, National Road Championships
2014
1st Overall Vuelta a Venezuela
8th Overall Vuelta al Táchira

1st Stage 2

2015
Vuelta Ciclista a Costa Rica

1st Points classification
1st Stage 3

2nd Overall Tour de Martinique
3rd Overall Vuelta a Venezuela
2016
1st Stage 3 Vuelta al Táchira
2017
1st Overall Vuelta al Táchira

1st Mountains classification
1st Stages 5 & 8

3rd Time trial, National Road Championships
2018
3rd Overall Tour de Guadeloupe

1st Points classification
1st Stages 4 & 6

2019
Tour de Guadeloupe

1st Mountains classification
1st Stage 2

3rd Overall Vuelta al Táchira

1st Stage 2

3rd Overall Vuelta a Venezuela
2020
4th Overall Vuelta al Táchira
2021
8th Overall Vuelta al Táchira
