= Boris Carène =

French road bicycle racer (born 1985)

Personal information
- Full name: Boris Carène
- Born: 7 December 1985 (age 40): Pointe-à-Pitre, Guadeloupe, France

Cycling career
- Sport: Cycling
- Current team: VC Lucéen
- Discipline: Road
- Role: Rider

Amateur teams
- 2007–2010: Only USL
- 2011–2012: Gwada Bikers 118
- 2013: US Lamentin
- 2014: Convergence SC Abymienne
- 2014: Differdange–Losch (stagiaire)
- 2015–2016: AS Baie-Mahault
- 2017–2020: Carène Development
- 2021–: VC Lucéen

Professional team
- 2015: Differdange–Losch

Boris Carène (born 7 December 1985 in Pointe-à-Pitre) is a French professional road bicycle racer, from Guadeloupe, who currently rides for French amateur team VC Lucéen. In 2011, he was the winner of the 61st edition of the Tour de Guadeloupe. He won the 2012 Caribbean Cycling Championships in Antigua.

== Biography ==
In 2011, he won the 61st edition of the Tour de Guadeloupe with the Gwada Bikers 118 team, becoming the first Guadeloupean to win the race in twenty years, following Molière Gène’s victory in 1991.

The following year, as the defending champion, he lined up as the clear favorite at the start of the 2012 Tour de la Guadeloupe. But about 20 km from the finish of Stage 4, while leading with three other breakaway riders (Simone Campagnaro of Nippo, Ludovic Turpin of USC Goyave, and Lachlan Morton of Chipotle-First Solar Development), he suffered a severe crash that forced him to withdraw. In late September, he joined the Boyacá Somos Todos - Fruver la Cosecha team to compete in the 52nd Clásico RCN, at the invitation of his friend Ismael Sarmiento. Lacking strength, he withdrew after the first mountain stage.

In 2014, following the Tour de la Guadeloupe, he signed a contract with the Luxembourg-based Continental team Team Differdange–Geba, but he stayed with the team only briefly, leaving in the first half of 2015.

In 2015, he won the 65th edition of the Tour de la Guadeloupe, the Tour de Marie-Galante, and the 26th Tour de Guyane.

In October 2016, he won another Caribbean time trial championship title.

On October 7, 2016, he introduced the new team he had created, Team Carène Cycling Développement, to better support him in cycling races, compete with the top local clubs, and train young riders. He appointed Riclaude Pensédent, former director of US Lamentinois, as manager.

In August 2018, he won the Tour de la Guadeloupe once again, succeeding Sébastien Fournet-Fayard on the race’s list of winners.

He has joined the VC Lucéen DN3 team for the 2021 season to compete in national races, while remaining a member of his home club, Carène Cycling Développement.

== Major results ==
2005
6th Overall Tour de Guadeloupe
2007
4th Overall Tour de Guadeloupe

1st Young rider classification

2009
4th Overall Tour de Guadeloupe

1st Stage 6

2010
2nd Overall Tour de Guadeloupe
2011
1st Overall Tour de Guadeloupe
3rd Overall Tour de Martinique

1st Stage 10 (ITT)

2013
9th Overall Tour de Guadeloupe
2014
6th Overall Tour de Guadeloupe
6th Duo Normand (with Johan Coenen)
7th Tour du Jura
2015
1st Overall Tour de Guadeloupe

1st Stage 2b (ITT), 4 & 8b (ITT)

6th Overall Vuelta a la Independencia Nacional
2017
6th Overall Tour de Guadeloupe
9th Overall Vuelta a la Independencia Nacional
10th Time trial, Pan American Road Championships
2018
1st Overall Tour de Guadeloupe

1st Stage 2b (ITT)
