= 2006 Critérium du Dauphiné Libéré =

2006 UCI ProTour, race 14 of 27

Race details
- Dates: 4–11 June 2006
- Stages: 7 + Prologue
- Distance: 1,098 km (682 mi)
- Winning time: 28h 07' 06"

Results
Jersey awarded to the overall winner	Winner	~~Levi Leipheimer~~ (Note: In 2012, Zabriskie, Leipheimer and Hincapie were disqualified from the result, according to the findings of a USADA investigation.) (USA)	(~~Gerolsteiner~~)
	Second	Christophe Moreau (FRA)	(AG2R Prévoyance)
	Third	Bernhard Kohl (AUT)	(T-Mobile Team)
Jersey awarded to the points classification winner	Points	Francisco Mancebo (ESP)	(AG2R Prévoyance)
Jersey awarded to the mountains classification winner	Mountains	Christophe Moreau (FRA)	(AG2R Prévoyance)
Jersey awarded to the combination classification winner	Combination	Christophe Moreau (FRA)	(AG2R Prévoyance)
	Team	AG2R Prévoyance	

The 2006 Critérium du Dauphiné Libéré was the 58th edition of the Critérium du Dauphiné Libéré cycle race and was held from 4 June to 11 June 2006. The race consisted of a Prologue and seven stages covering a total of 1,098 km (682 mi), starting in Annecy and finishing in Grenoble.

American Levi Leipheimer of Team Gerolsteiner initially captured the overall title and the maillot jaune et bleu ahead of France's Christophe Moreau and Germany's Bernhard Kohl (T-Mobile Team). Christophe Moreau (AG2R Prévoyance) secured the King of the Mountains competition and the combined classification (winner of the maillot bleu). The points classification for sprinters went to Spaniard Francisco Mancebo. French team AG2R Prévoyance captured the team title.

Leipheimer was disqualified from the result in 2012, following a USADA investigation. After admitting that he had been doping from 1999 to 2007, Levi Leipheimer lost all his results, and no overall winner is recognised by the race organisation.

The 2006 edition featured a feast of climbing, and is considered the ideal race for the Tour de France contenders to hone their form. After eight challenging stages, it finished on June 11 – just under three weeks before the start of 'La Grande Boucle'.

== Teams ==
Twenty-one teams, each with a maximum of eight riders, entered the race:

- Euskaltel–Euskadi
- Phonak
- Gerolsteiner
- Discovery Channel
- Würth
- Cofidis
- Saunier Duval–Prodir
- Crédit Agricole
- Caisse d'Epargne–Illes Balears
- Davitamon–Lotto
- AG2R Prévoyance
- T-Mobile Team
- Rabobank
- Française des Jeux
- Team CSC
- Quick-Step–Innergetic
- Lampre–Fondital
- Bouygues Télécom
- Liquigas
- Team Milram
- Agritubel

== Route ==
Stage characteristics and winners
Stage	Date	Course	Distance	Type	Winner
P	4 June	Annecy	4.1 km (2.5 mi)	Individual time trial	~~David Zabriskie (USA)~~
1	5 June	Annecy to Bourgoin-Jallieu	207 km (129 mi)		Fabian Wegmann (GER)
2	6 June	Bourgoin-Jallieu to Saint-Galmier	203 km (126 mi)		Philippe Gilbert (BEL)
3	7 June	Bourg-de-Péage to Bourg-de-Péage	43 km (27 mi)	Individual time trial	~~David Zabriskie (USA)~~
4	8 June	Tain-l'Hermitage to Mont Ventoux	186 km (116 mi)		Denis Menchov (RUS)
5	9 June	Sisteron to Briançon	155 km (96 mi)		Ludovic Turpin (FRA)
6	10 June	Briançon to La Toussuire	169 km (105 mi)		Iban Mayo (ESP)
7	11 June	Saint-Jean-de-Maurienne to Grenoble	131 km (81 mi)		Thor Hushovd (NOR)

== Stages ==
=== Prologue ===
4 June 2006 — Annecy, 4.1 km (2.5 mi) (ITT)

Prologue Result

	Rider	Team	Time
~~1~~	~~David Zabriskie (USA)~~	~~Team CSC~~	~~4' 35"~~
~~2~~	~~George Hincapie (USA)~~	~~Discovery Channel~~	~~+ 2"~~
3	Stuart O'Grady (AUS)	Team CSC	+ 6"

General Classification after Prologue

	Rider	Team	Time
~~1~~	~~David Zabriskie (USA)~~	~~Team CSC~~	~~4' 35"~~
~~2~~	~~George Hincapie (USA)~~	~~Discovery Channel~~	~~+ 2"~~
3	Stuart O'Grady (AUS)	Team CSC	+ 6"

=== Stage 1 ===
5 June 2006 — Annecy to Bourgoin-Jallieu, 207 km (128.6 mi)

Stage 1 result

	Rider	Team	Time
1	Fabian Wegmann (GER)	Gerolsteiner	5h 06' 36"
2	Thomas Voeckler (FRA)	Bouygues Télécom	s.t.
3	Egoi Martínez (ESP)	Discovery Channel	s.t.

General Classification after Stage 1

	Rider	Team	Time
1	Fabian Wegmann (GER)	Gerolsteiner	5h 11' 23"
2	Thomas Voeckler (FRA)	Bouygues Télécom	+ 5"
~~3~~	~~David Zabriskie (USA)~~	~~Team CSC~~	~~+ 5"~~

=== Stage 2 ===
6 June 2006 — Bourgoin-Jallieu to Saint-Galmier, 203 km (126.1 mi)

Stage 2 result

	Rider	Team	Time
1	Philippe Gilbert (BEL)	Française des Jeux	4h 45' 53"
2	Samuel Dumoulin (FRA)	AG2R Prévoyance	+ 5' 19"
3	Peter Wrolich (AUT)	Gerolsteiner	+ 5' 23"

General Classification after Stage 2

	Rider	Team	Time
1	Philippe Gilbert (BEL)	Française des Jeux	9h 57' 13"
2	Fabian Wegmann (GER)	Gerolsteiner	+ 5' 22"
3	Thomas Voeckler (FRA)	Bouygues Télécom	+ 5' 27"

=== Stage 3 ===
7 June 2006 — Bourg-de-Péage, 43 km (26.7 mi) (ITT)

Stage 3 result

	Rider	Team	Time
~~1~~	~~David Zabriskie (USA)~~	~~Team CSC~~	~~52' 48"~~
2	Floyd Landis (USA)	Phonak	+ 53"
~~3~~	~~Levi Leipheimer (USA)~~	~~Gerolsteiner~~	~~+ 1' 17"~~

General Classification after Stage 3

	Rider	Team	Time
1	Philippe Gilbert (BEL)	Française des Jeux	10h 52' 41"
~~2~~	~~David Zabriskie (USA)~~	~~Team CSC~~	~~+ 2' 47"~~
3	Floyd Landis (USA)	Phonak	+ 3' 48"

=== Stage 4 ===
8 June 2006 — Tain-l'Hermitage to Le Mont-Ventoux, 186 km (115.6 mi)

Stage 4 result

	Rider	Team	Time
1	Denis Menchov (RUS)	Rabobank	4h 50' 37"
2	Christophe Moreau (FRA)	AG2R Prévoyance	s.t.
~~3~~	~~Levi Leipheimer (USA)~~	~~Gerolsteiner~~	~~+ 15"~~

General Classification after Stage 4

	Rider	Team	Time
~~1~~	~~Levi Leipheimer (USA)~~	~~Gerolsteiner~~	~~15h 47' 53"~~
2	Denis Menchov (RUS)	Rabobank	+ 28"
3	Philippe Gilbert (BEL)	Française des Jeux	+ 1' 08"

=== Stage 5 ===
9 June 2006 — Sisteron to Briançon, 155 km (96.3 mi)

Stage 5 result

	Rider	Team	Time
1	Ludovic Turpin (FRA)	AG2R Prévoyance	4h 06' 49"
2	Iban Mayo (ESP)	Euskaltel–Euskadi	+ 26"
3	Francisco Mancebo (ESP)	AG2R Prévoyance	+ 27"

General Classification after Stage 5

	Rider	Team	Time
~~1~~	~~Levi Leipheimer (USA)~~	~~Gerolsteiner~~	~~19h 55' 30"~~
2	Denis Menchov (RUS)	Rabobank	+ 28"
3	Christophe Moreau (FRA)	AG2R Prévoyance	+ 1' 48"

=== Stage 6 ===
10 June 2006 — Briançon to La Toussuire, 169 km (105.0 mi)

Stage 6 result

	Rider	Team	Time
1	Iban Mayo (ESP)	Euskaltel–Euskadi	5h 01' 42"
2	Alejandro Valverde (ESP)	Caisse d'Epargne–Illes Balears	+ 1' 21"
3	Christophe Moreau (FRA)	AG2R Prévoyance	+ 1' 37"

General Classification after Stage 6

	Rider	Team	Time
~~1~~	~~Levi Leipheimer (USA)~~	~~Gerolsteiner~~	~~24h 58' 49"~~
2	Christophe Moreau (FRA)	AG2R Prévoyance	+ 1' 48"
3	Bernhard Kohl (AUT)	T-Mobile Team	+ 2' 51"

=== Stage 7 ===
11 June 2006 — Saint-Jean-de-Maurienne to Grenoble, 131 km (81.4 mi)

Stage 7 result

	Rider	Team	Time
1	Thor Hushovd (NOR)	Crédit Agricole	3h 08' 17"
2	Samuel Dumoulin (FRA)	AG2R Prévoyance	s.t.
3	Philippe Gilbert (BEL)	Française des Jeux	s.t.

General Classification after Stage 7

	Rider	Team	Time
~~1~~	~~Levi Leipheimer (USA)~~	~~Gerolsteiner~~	~~28h 07' 06"~~
2	Christophe Moreau (FRA)	AG2R Prévoyance	+ 1' 48"
3	Bernhard Kohl (AUT)	T-Mobile Team	+ 2' 51"

== Final standings ==
=== General classification ===
Final general classification

	Cyclist	Team	Time
~~1~~	~~Levi Leipheimer (USA)~~	~~Gerolsteiner~~	~~28h 07' 06"~~
2	Christophe Moreau (FRA)	AG2R Prévoyance	+ 1' 48"
3	Bernhard Kohl (AUT)	T-Mobile Team	+ 2' 51"
4	José Azevedo (POR)	Discovery Channel	+ 3' 00"
5	Francisco Mancebo (ESP)	AG2R Prévoyance	+ 3' 29"
6	Denis Menchov (RUS)	Rabobank	+ 4' 14"
7	Alejandro Valverde (ESP)	Caisse d'Epargne–Illes Balears	+ 4' 21"
8	Leonardo Piepoli (ITA)	SDV	+ 5' 13"
9	Pietro Caucchioli (ITA)	Crédit Agricole	+ 5' 45"
~~10~~	~~George Hincapie (USA)~~	~~Discovery Channel~~	~~+ 6' 48"~~

=== Points classification ===
	Cyclist	Team	Points
1	Francisco Mancebo (ESP)	AG2R Prévoyance	69
2	Philippe Gilbert (BEL)	Française des Jeux	60
~~3~~	~~George Hincapie (USA)~~	~~Discovery Channel~~	~~57~~

=== Mountains classification ===
	Cyclist	Team	Points
1	Christophe Moreau (FRA)	AG2R Prévoyance	162
~~2~~	~~Levi Leipheimer (USA)~~	~~Gerolsteiner~~	~~126~~
3	Denis Menchov (RUS)	Rabobank	119

=== Combined classification ===
	Cyclist	Team	Points
1	Christophe Moreau (FRA)	AG2R Prévoyance	224
~~2~~	~~Levi Leipheimer (USA)~~	~~Gerolsteiner~~	~~221~~
3	Denis Menchov (RUS)	Rabobank	171

== Jersey progress ==
Stage	Winner	General classification	Mountains classification	Points classification	Combined classification	Team Classification
P	~~David Zabriskie~~	~~David Zabriskie~~	~~George Hincapie~~	~~David Zabriskie~~		Discovery Channel
1	Fabian Wegmann	Fabian Wegmann	Thomas Voeckler	~~David Zabriskie~~	Thomas Voeckler	Discovery Channel
2	Philippe Gilbert	Philippe Gilbert	Sébastien Joly	Philippe Gilbert	Thomas Voeckler	Française des Jeux
3	~~David Zabriskie~~	Philippe Gilbert	Sébastien Joly	~~David Zabriskie~~	Philippe Gilbert	Team CSC
4	Denis Menchov	~~Levi Leipheimer~~	Denis Menchov	~~David Zabriskie~~	~~Levi Leipheimer~~	Discovery Channel
5	Ludovic Turpin	~~Levi Leipheimer~~	Christophe Moreau	Francisco Mancebo	~~Levi Leipheimer~~	AG2R Prévoyance
6	Iban Mayo	~~Levi Leipheimer~~	Christophe Moreau	Francisco Mancebo	Christophe Moreau	AG2R Prévoyance
7	Thor Hushovd	~~Levi Leipheimer~~	Christophe Moreau	Francisco Mancebo	Christophe Moreau	AG2R Prévoyance
Final		~~Levi Leipheimer~~	Christophe Moreau	Francisco Mancebo	Christophe Moreau	AG2R Prévoyance
