= Aleksandar Radunović =

Serbian footballer

Personal information
- Full name: Aleksandar Radunović
- Date of birth: 9 May 1980 (age 46)
- Place of birth: Zrenjanin, SFR Yugoslavia
- Height: 1.86 m (6 ft 1 in)
- Position: Defender

Team information
- Current team: Vojvodina (youth coach)

Youth career
- Partizan

Senior career*
Years	Team	Apps	(Gls)
2001–2002	Radnički Beograd	5	(0)
2002–2003	Budućnost Valjevo	22	(1)
2003–2004	Radnički Beograd	6	(0)
2004–2005	Korona Kielce	23	(0)
2005–2007	ŁKS Łódź	18	(0)
2007–2013	BSK Borča	146	(7)
2013–2014	Radnički Šid	28	(1)

Managerial career
- Vojvodina (youth)
- 2022: Novi Sad 1921
- 2025–: Vojvodina (youth)
- * Club domestic league appearances and goals

Aleksandar Radunović (Serbian Cyrillic: Александар Радуновић; born 9 May 1980) is a Serbian former professional footballer who works as a youth coach for Serbian SuperLiga club Vojvodina.

Beside his home clubs FK Radnički Beograd and FK Budućnost Valjevo, Radunović previously played for ŁKS Łódź in the Polish Ekstraklasa. and also with Korona Kielce.

== Honours ==
Korona Kielce

- II liga: 2004–05
