= Caparrapí =

- Municipality and town
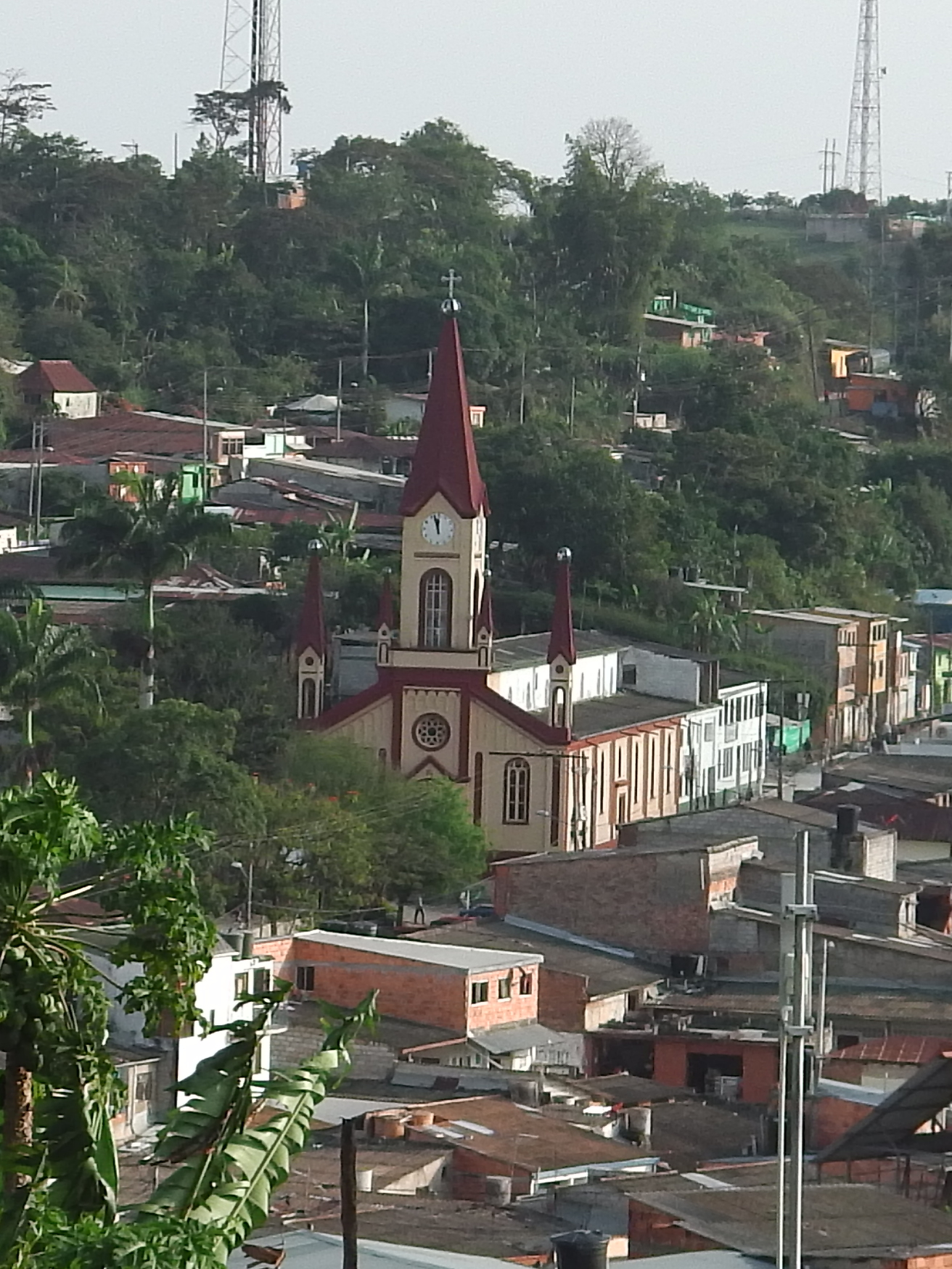
- View of Panoramic_of_Caparrapí.JPG

- Flag Coat of arms

- Location of the municipality and town inside Cundinamarca Department of Colombia

- Location in Colombia
- Coordinates: 5°20′39″N 74°29′30″W
- Country: Colombia
- Department: Cundinamarca

Population (Census 2018)
  - Total: 10,301
- Time zone: UTC-5 (Colombia Standard Time)

Caparrapí is a municipality and town of Colombia in the department of Cundinamarca.
