= Jesús Torres (cyclist) =

Venezuelan cyclist

Personal information
- Born: 30 August 1954 (age 72)

Cycling career
- Sport: Cycling

Jesús Torres (born 30 August 1954) is a Venezuelan former cyclist. He competed in the individual road race event at the 1980 Summer Olympics.
