= Gérard Annequin =

French cyclist

Gérard Annequin (born 15 December 1948) is a French former racing cyclist. He won the tour of Guadeloupe in 1971.
