= Sébastien Fournet-Fayard =

French road cyclist

Personal information
- Born: 25 April 1985 (age 41) Clermont-Ferrand, France

Cycling career
- Sport: Cycling
- Current team: Pro Immo Nicolas Roux
- Discipline: Road
- Role: Rider

Amateur teams
- 2003–2004: VC Cournon d'Auvergne
- 2005: Entente Cycliste Clermont Communauté
- 2006: Entente Cycliste Montmarault Montluçon
- 2007: CR4C Roanne
- 2011: Véranda Rideau Sarthe
- 2012: Vulco-VC Vaulx-en-Velin
- 2013–: Pro Immo Nicolas Roux

Professional teams
- 2007: Crédit Agricole (stagiaire)
- 2008–2010: Carmiooro A Style

Sébastien Fournet-Fayard (born 25 April 1985) is a French road cyclist, who currently rides for Pro Immo Nicolas Roux.

== Major results ==
2007
3rd Overall Cinturó de l'Empordà
4th Chrono des Nations U23
6th Overall Ronde de l'Isard
2015
6th Overall Tour de Guadeloupe
8th Overall Grand Prix Chantal Biya
2016
5th Overall Tour de Guadeloupe

1st Stage 2b (ITT)

2017
1st Overall Tour de Guadeloupe

1st Stage 8b (ITT)

1st Mountains classification Tour du Jura
2018
7th Overall Tour de Guadeloupe

1st Stage 8b (ITT)
