= Cárdenas Municipality, Táchira =

Municipality in Táchira, Venezuela

Cárdenas Municipality Municipio Cárdenas
- Municipality
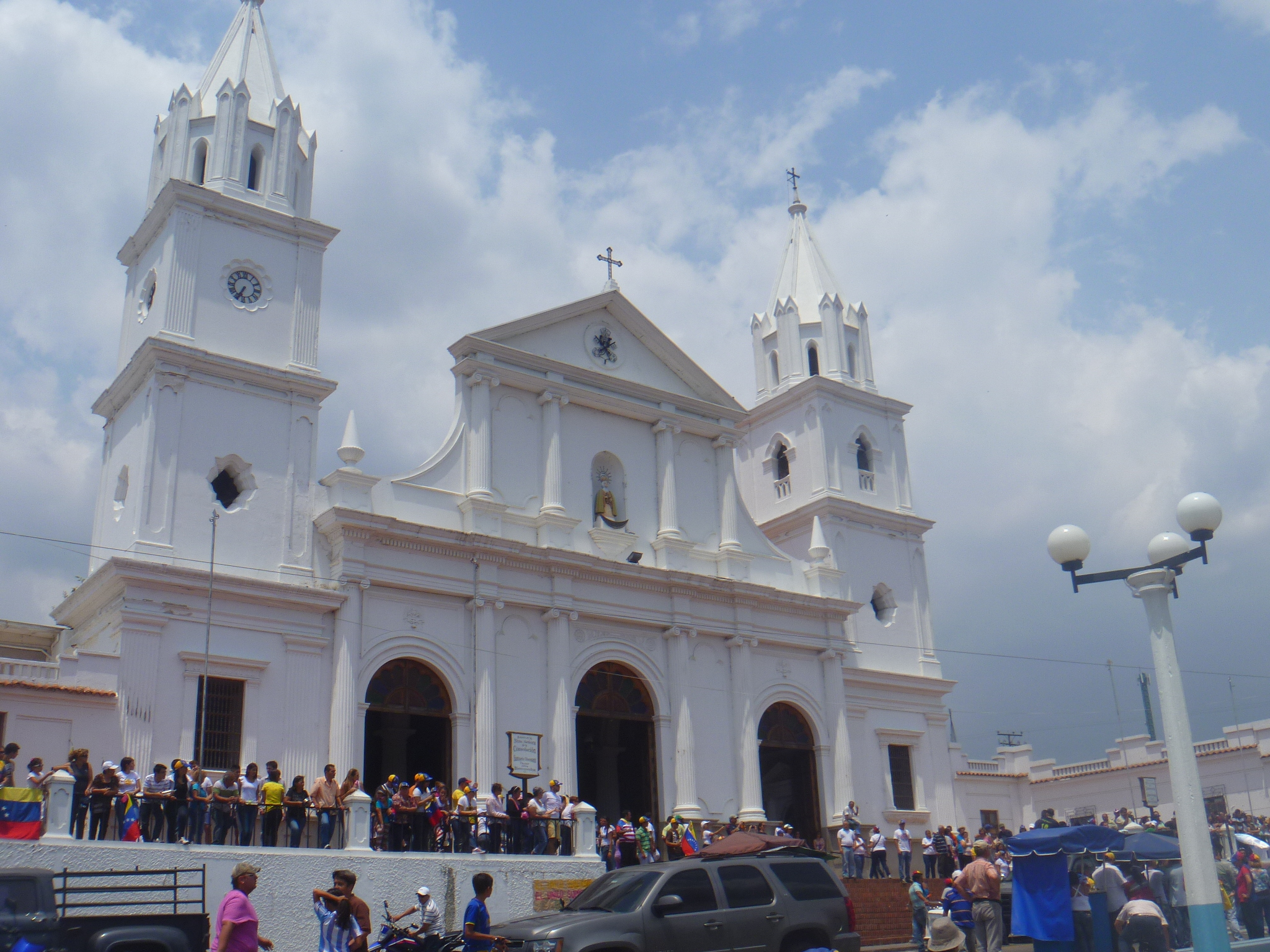

- Flag Seal

- Location in Táchira

- Location in Venezuela
- Country: Venezuela
- State: Táchira
- Founded: 1872
- Municipal seat: Táriba

Government
  - Mayor: Marta Gallo Torres (PSUV)

Area
  - Total: 244.5 km^{2} (94.4 sq mi)

Population (2023)
  - Total: 147,584
  - Density: 603.6/km^{2} (1,563/sq mi)
- Time zone: UTC−4 (VET)

Cárdenas Municipality is one of the 29 municipalities in Táchira state, Venezuela. The municipality has a total surface of 262 km^{2} and it has some 147,584 inhabitants (2023 census). Its capital is Táriba.
