= Nicolas Dumont (cyclist) =

French bicycle racer (1973–2025)

- Nicolas Dumont in CC Étupes team colours

Personal information
- Born: 15 June 1973 Auxerre, France
- Died: 10 July 2025 (aged 52) Petit-Bourg, Guadeloupe

Cycling career
- Sport: Cycling
- Discipline: Road
- Role: Rider

Amateur teams
- 1996: VC Pontivy
- 1997–1999: CC Étupes
- 2002–2003: CC Étupes
- ?–2011: US Lamentin
- 2013: VC Grand Case
- 2015–2017: VC Grand Case
- 2019–2020: Carène Cycling Développement

Professional teams
- 2000: Besson Chaussures
- 2001: Phonak

Nicolas Dumont (French: [nikɔlɑ dymɔ̃]; 15 June 1973 – 10 July 2025) was a French road cyclist.

Dumont died in Guadeloupe on 10 July 2025, as the result of a traffic accident. He was 52.

== Major results ==
1996
1st Stage 4 Tour de l'Ain
1st Stage 2b Ronde de l'Isard
1998
3rd Tour du Finistère
2000
4th Tour du Doubs
5th GP de Villers-Cotterêts
2002
1st Overall Circuit des Ardennes
1st Grand Prix des Marbriers
2nd Overall Ruban Granitier Breton
2003
2nd Tour du Jura
3rd Overall Circuit des Ardennes
2004
3rd Overall Tour de Guadeloupe

1st Stage 5

2007
1st Stage 2 Vuelta a la Independencia Nacional
2nd Overall Tour de la Guadeloupe
2009
1st Overall Tour de Guadeloupe

1st Stages 2b (TTT) & 8b

2012
9th Overall Tour de Guadeloupe
