= Venezuelan National Time Trial Championships =

National road cycling championship in Venezuela

The Venezuelan national champions jersey

The Venezuelan National Road Race Championships are held annually, and are governed by the Venezuelan Cycling Federation (in Spanish: Federación Venezolana de Ciclismo). The event also includes the Venezuelan National Road Race Championships.

== Multiple winners ==
Men

| Wins | Name | Years |
|---|---|---|
| 4 | José Chacón Díaz | 2000, 2003, 2004, 2011 |
| 4 | Tomás Gil | 2006, 2008, 2010, 2012 |
| 3 | José Rujano | 2007, 2009, 2013 |
| 3 | Pedro Gutiérrez | 2016, 2017, 2018 |
| 2 | Orluis Aular | 2019, 2022 |

Women

| Wins | Name | Years |
|---|---|---|
| 10 | Danielys García | 2006, 2008, 2009, 2010, 2011, 2012, 2013, 2014, 2016, 2018 |
| 2 | Wilmarys Moreno | 2019, 2021 |
| 2 | Lilibeth Chacón | 2017, 2022 |

== Men ==
=== Elite ===
| Year | Gold | Silver | Bronze |
|---|---|---|---|
| 1999 | Aldrin Salamanca | Omar Pumar | Josmer Méndez |
| 2000 | José Chacón Díaz | Alexis Méndez | Aldrin Salamanca |
| 2001 | Jose Malave | Jorge Rodriguez | Henry Meneses |
| 2002 | Franklin Chacón | José Chacón Díaz | Manuel Medina |
| 2003 | José Chacón Díaz | Carlos Ochoa | Franklin Chacón |
| 2004 | José Chacón Díaz | Tomás Gil | César Salazar |
| 2005 | No championship held | | |
| 2006 | Tomás Gil | Andris Hernández | Manuel Medina |
| 2007 | José Rujano | Franklin Chacón | Tomás Gil |
| 2008 | Tomás Gil | Víctor Moreno | Noel Vasquez |
| 2009 | José Rujano | Víctor Moreno | Richard Ochoa |
| 2010 | Tomás Gil | José Chacón Díaz | Carlos Gálviz |
| 2011 | José Chacón Díaz | Tomás Gil | Richard Ochoa |
| 2012 | Tomás Gil | José Chacón Díaz | Carlos Gálviz |
| 2013 | José Rujano | Carlos Gálviz | Pedro Gutiérrez |
| 2014 | Carlos Gálviz | José Rujano | Tomás Gil |
| 2015 | Yonder Godoy | José Rujano | Tomás Gil |
| 2016 | Pedro Gutiérrez | José Alarcón | Anderson Timoteo Paredes |
| 2017 | Pedro Gutiérrez | José Alarcón | Yonathan Salinas |
| 2018 | Pedro Gutiérrez | Carlos Gálviz | José Alarcón |
| 2019 | Orluis Aular | Carlos Gálviz | Ángel Pulgar |
| 2020 | Carlos Gálviz | Jeison José Rujano | Orluis Aular |
| 2021 | Jeison José Rujano | Enmanuel Viloria | José Andrés Díaz |
| 2022 | Orluis Aular | José Alarcón | Ángel Rivas |

== Women ==
=== Elite ===
| Year | Gold | Silver | Bronze |
|---|---|---|---|
| 1999 | Lohana Torres | Anrosi Paruta | Melisa González |
| 2000 | No championship held | | |
| 2001 | Daeira Díaz | Dayana Marín | Maria Brito |
| 2002 | Anrosi Paruta | María Maldonado | Ismary Orellana |
| 2003 | Anrosi Paruta | Danielys García | Blendys Rojas |
| 2004– 2005 | No championship held | | |
| 2006 | Danielys García | Francimar Pinto | Angelica Quintero |
| 2007 | Karelia Machado | Fanny Álvarez | Danielys García |
| 2008 | Danielys García | María Briceño | Francimar Pinto |
| 2009 | Danielys García | María Briceño | Fanny Álvarez |
| 2010 | Danielys García | María Briceño | Fanny Álvarez |
| 2011 | Danielys García | Angie González | María Briceño |
| 2012 | Danielys García | María Briceño | Angie González |
| 2013 | Danielys García | Lilibeth Chacón | Jennifer Cesar |
| 2014 | Danielys García | Angie González | Wilmarys Moreno |
| 2015 | Jennifer Cesar | Wilmarys Moreno | María Briceño |
| 2016 | Danielys García | Lilibeth Chacón | Maria Rueda |
| 2017 | Lilibeth Chacón | Yngrid Porras | Jennifer Cesar |
| 2018 | Danielys García | Wilmarys Moreno | María Briceño |
| 2019 | Wilmarys Moreno | María Briceño | Yngrid Porras |
| 2020 | Maria Andreina Daza | Angie González | Wilmarys Moreno |
| 2021 | Wilmarys Moreno | Andisabel Luque | Katherine Clemant |
| 2022 | Lilibeth Chacón | Angy Deneska Luna | Wilmarys Moreno |

== See also ==
- Venezuelan National Road Race Championships
- National road cycling championships
