= Ludovic Turpin =

French cyclist

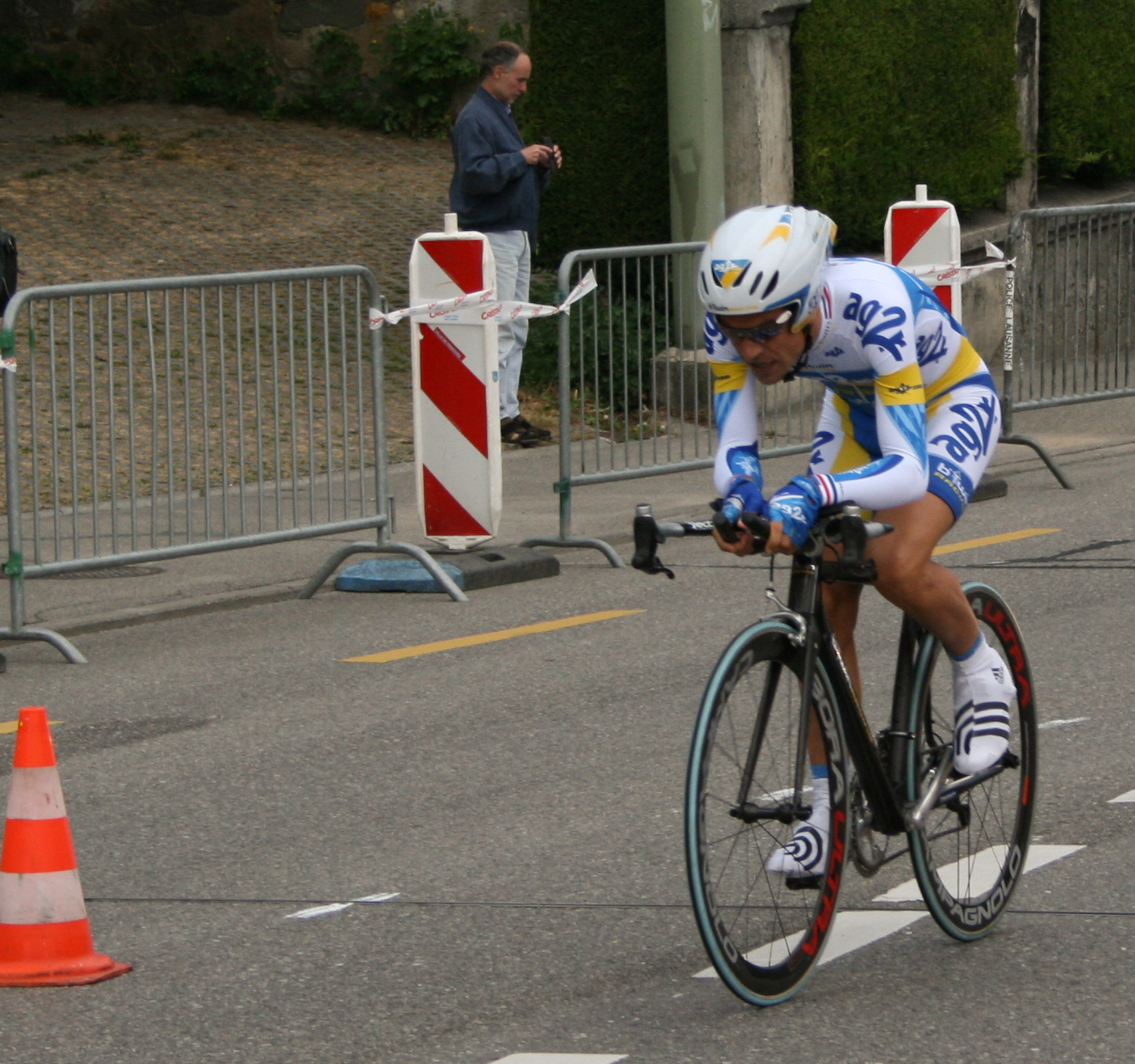

Personal information
- Full name: Ludovic Turpin
- Born: 22 March 1975 (age 51) Laval, France
- Height: 1.70 m (5 ft 7 in)
- Weight: 57 kg (126 lb)

Cycling career
- Sport: Cycling
- Discipline: Road
- Role: Rider

Amateur teams
- 1997–1999: CC Étupes
- 1999: Casino–Ag2r Prévoyance (stagiaire)
- 2012: U.S.C. Goyave
- 2013–2018: Vélo Club Grand Case

Professional teams
- 2000–2010: AG2R Prévoyance
- 2011: Saur–Sojasun

Major wins
- GP de la Ville de Rennes (2005), Critérium du Dauphiné Libéré Stage 5 (2006)

Ludovic Turpin (born 22 March 1975 in Laval) is a French professional road racing cyclist, who most recently competed for amateur team Vélo Club Grand Case.

Turpin was involved in a fist fight after a crash in stage six of the 2015 Tour de Guadeloupe.

== Major results ==
2000
4th Overall Tour Down Under
5th Coppa Sabatini
6th Trofeo Laigueglia
2001
3rd Overall Giro della Provincia di Lucca
2002
2nd Paris–Camembert
3rd Overall Tour de l'Ain
4th Overall Tour du Limousin
7th Coppa Placci
2003
1st Stage 2 Route du Sud
4th Overall Tour de l'Ain

1st Stage 3

7th Giro della Romagna
2004
9th Overall Circuit de la Sarthe

1st Stage 2

2005
1st Grand Prix de Rennes
2nd Overall French Road Cycling Cup
2nd Overall Tour de l'Ain
2nd Polynormande
4th Route Adélie
7th Overall Four Days of Dunkirk
2006
1st Stage 5 Critérium du Dauphiné Libéré
5th Overall Étoile de Bessèges
8th Paris–Camembert
2007
2nd Overall Tour de l'Ain
5th Overall Circuit de Lorraine

1st Stage 1

5th Trophée des Grimpeurs
2009
1st Stage 3 Tour de l'Ain
2010
7th Gran Premio Bruno Beghelli
2012
1st Overall Tour de Guadeloupe

1st Points classification
1st Stages 2b (ITT), 5 & 8b (ITT)

2013
4th Overall Tour de Guadeloupe

1st Stages 2b (ITT) & 6

9th Overall Tour do Rio
2014
5th Overall Tour de Guadeloupe
2016
9th Overall Tour de Guadeloupe
2017
1st Stage 5 Vuelta a la Independencia Nacional
10th Overall Tour de Guadeloupe
