= National road cycling championships =

An example of the British, French, German and Italian national cycling jerseys

National road cycling championships are held annually by host nations in each cycle racing discipline. The annual events can take place at any time of the year. European nations usually holds their annual events in June, during a designed break in the professional calendar.

In road racing, winning riders of national championships are crowned as:

- Men's Elite Road Race Champion
- Men's Elite Time Trial Champion
- Women's Road Race Champion
- Women's Time Trial Champion
- Men's Under-23 Road Race Champion
- Men's Under-23 Time Trial Champion

== National champion cycling jersey ==
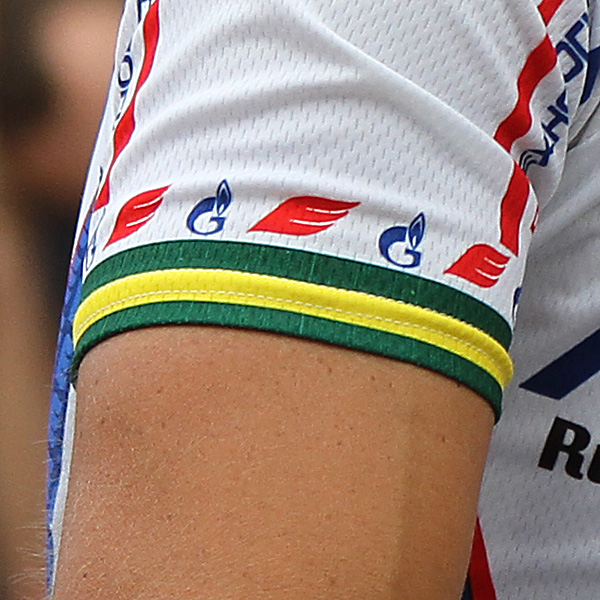
The armband of the Australian National Champion, as worn by Robbie McEwen as part of his Team Katusha jersey

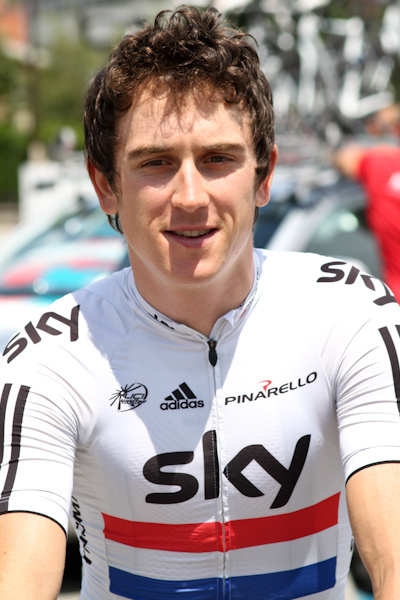
Geraint Thomas in 2011, wearing his jersey as 2010 British National Road Race Champion

A national champion cycling jersey is a cycling jersey awarded to the winning riders of each event at the national cycling championships sponsored by the national governing body and recognized by the Union Cycliste Internationale (UCI). The national champion cycling jersey is often colored and styled after that country's national flag, or else utilises the country's national colours.

Riders are authorized to wear an awarded national champion cycling jersey until next year's national championship. Afterwards, past champions may wear the national colors around the neckline and arm bands.

== See also ==
- 2025 national road cycling championships
