= Vuelta al Táchira =

Venezuelan multi-day road cycling race

Race details
- Date: January
- Region: Táchira, Venezuela
- English name: Tour of Táchira
- Local name: Vuelta ciclista al Táchira (in Spanish)
- Discipline: Road race
- Competition: UCI America Tour
- Type: Stage race
- Web site: vueltaaltachira.com.ve

History
- First edition: 1966
- Editions: 61 (as of 2026)
- First winner: Martín Emilio Rodríguez (COL)
- Most wins: José Rujano (VEN) (4 wins)
- Most recent: Jorge Abreu (VEN)

The Vuelta ciclista al Táchira (English: Tour of Táchira) is a multi-day road bicycle racing stage race held annually each January since 1966 in the state of Táchira in western Venezuela. The Vuelta al Táchira is part of the UCI America Tour, which is one of six UCI Continental Circuits sponsored by the Union Cycliste Internationale, which is the sport's international governing body, and the Venezuelan Cycling Federation. This event takes place during the Festival of Saint Sebastian which dates back to colonial times.

== Past winners ==
Year	Country	Rider	Team
1966	Colombia	Martín Emilio Rodríguez	Antioquia
1967	Colombia	Gustavo Rincón	Cundinamarca
1968	Colombia	Martín Emilio Rodríguez	Antioquia
1969	Colombia	Álvaro Pachón	Cundinamarca
1970	Colombia	Álvaro Pachón	Colombia
1971	Colombia	Martín Emilio Rodríguez	Colombia
1972	Colombia	Miguel Samaca	Colombia
1973	Venezuela	Santos Bermúdez	Club Martell
1974	Colombia	Álvaro Pachón	Colombia
1975	Venezuela	Fernando Fontes	Club Martell
1976	Venezuela	Fernando Fontes	Club Martell
1977	Colombia	José Patrocinio Jiménez	Colombia
1978	Venezuela	Efraín Rodríguez	Loteria del Tachira
1979	Venezuela	José Duaxt Hernández	Loteria del Tachira
1980	Colombia	Epifanio Arcila	OPE - Trujillo
1981	Colombia	Carlos Julio Siachoque	
1982	Soviet Union	Ramazan Galeitdinov	
1983	Venezuela	Mario Medina	
1984	Colombia	Carlos Alba	
1985	Venezuela	José Lindarte	
1986	Cuba	Eduardo Alonso	
1987	Venezuela	Elio Villamizar	
1988	Soviet Union	Viatcheslav Ekimov	
1989	Colombia	Luis Felipe Moreno	
1990	Colombia	José Vicente Díaz	
1991	Colombia	Ángel Yesid Camargo	
1992	Venezuela	Luis Barroso	
1993	Venezuela	Leonardo Sierra	
1994	Venezuela	Alexis Méndez	
1995	Venezuela	Carlos Maya	
1996	Colombia	Raúl Gómez	
1997	Colombia	César Salazar	
1998	Venezuela	Julio César Blanco	
1999	Venezuela	Aldrin Salamanca	
2000	Venezuela	Noel Vasquez	
2001	Venezuela	Noel Vasquez	
2002	Venezuela	Freddy Vargas	Kino Tachira A
2003	Colombia	Hernán Darío Muñoz	Colombia-Selle Italia
2004	Venezuela	José Rujano	Colombia-Selle Italia
2005	Venezuela	José Rujano	Selle Italia Gob Norte de Santander
2006	Venezuela	Manuel Medina	Gobernación del Zulia
2007	Colombia	Hernán Buenahora	Gobernación del Zulia
2008	Venezuela	Manuel Medina	Gobernación del Zulia
2009	Venezuela	Rónald González	Loteria del Táchira
2010	Venezuela	José Rujano	Gobernación Del Zulia
2011	Venezuela	Manuel Medina	Gobernación Del Zulia
2012	Venezuela	Jimmi Briceño	Loteria del Táchira
2013	Venezuela	Yeison Delgado	Kino Táchira-Drodínica
2014	Venezuela	Jimmi Briceño	Loteria del Táchira
2015	Venezuela	José Rujano	Gobernación de Mérida
2016	Costa Rica	Joseph Chavarría	Nestlé-Giant
2017	Venezuela	Yonathan Salinas	Kino Táchira
2018	Venezuela	Pedro Gutiérrez	Gobierno de Yaracuy–Banco Bicentenario
2019	Venezuela	Yimmi José Briceño	
2020	Venezuela	Roniel Campos	Deportivo Táchira
2021	Venezuela	Roniel Campos	Atlético Venezuela
2022	Venezuela	Roniel Campos	Deportivo Táchira-JHS
2023	Venezuela	José Alarcón	Fundación Ángeles Hernández
2024	Ecuador	Jonathan Caicedo	Team Petrolike–Androni Giocatolli
2025	Venezuela	Eduin Becerra	Team Trululu Grupo La Guacamaya
2026	Venezuela	Jorge Abreu	Fina Arroz CES Multimarcas Bancamiga
