= Tucson Bicycle Classic =

Race details
- Date: March
- Region: Tucson, Arizona
- Discipline: Road
- Competition: National calendar
- Type: Stage race

History
- First edition: 1989
- Editions: 37 (as of 2025)
- First winner: Mark Southard (USA)
- Most recent: Patrick Welch (USA)

History (women)
- First winner: Rebecca Twigg (USA)
- Most recent: Anna Hicks (USA)

The Tucson Bicycle Classic is a multi-day cycling race held in Tucson, Arizona. The race takes annually in late February or early March and is contested over four days, consisting of a prologue time trial, a road race, a criterium, and a circuit race (new in 2026).

== Winners ==
=== Men ===
Year	Winner	Second	Third
1989	(United States) Mark Southard	(United States) Bart Bowen	(United States) Rod Bush
1990	(United States) Kent Bostick	(United States) Bob Roll	(United States) Tom Tease
1991	(United States) Richard McClung	(United States) Douglas Loveday	(United States) Steve Wood
1992–1993	?		
1994	(United Kingdom) Malcolm Elliott	(United States) Bobby Julich	(Canada) Scott Price
1995	(United States) Mariano Friedick	(United States) Kent Bostick	(United States) Zach Conrad
1996	(United States) Adam Laurent	(United Kingdom) Brian Smith	(United States) Erin Korff
1997	?		
1998	(United States) Dylan Casey	(United States) Shawn Cronkite	(United States) Keith Casserly
1999	(Canada) Gordon Fraser	(United States) Michael Sayers	(Mexico) Christian Valenzuela
2000	(Canada) Scott Price	(United States) Douglas Loveday	(United States) Phil Zajicek
2001	(Canada) Scott Price	(United States) Scott Blanchard	(United States) Andrew Wilson
2002	(Canada) Gordon Fraser	(United States) Mariano Friedick	(United States) Adham Sbeih
2003	(United States) Cory Steinbrecher	(United States) Brent Dawson	(United States) Ryan Blickem
2004	(United States) Mike Jones	(United States) Nathan Mitchell	(United States) Ryan Blickem
2005-2006	?		
2007	(Mexico) David Salomon	(United States) Brian Forbes	(Colombia) Hernán Darío Muñoz
2008	(Mexico) David Salomon	(United States) Joshua Liberles	(United States) Andrew Miller
2009	(United States) Michael Grabinger	(United States) Mike Mathis	(United States) Scott Stewart
2010	(United States) Phil Zajicek	(United States) Jonathan Chodroff	(United States) Eric Marcotte
2011	(United States) Phil Zajicek	(United States) Eric Marcotte	(United States) Alister Ratcliff
2012	(Spain) Francisco Mancebo	(Mexico) Héctor Rangel	(United States) Ian Burnett
2013	(Mexico) Héctor Rangel	(United States) Travis McCabe	(United States) Eric Young
2014	(Costa Rica) Gregory Brenes	(United States) Ben Jacques-Maynes	(United States) Charles Cassin
2015	(Mexico) Juan Pablo Magallanes	(Canada) Matteo Dal-Cin	(United States) Rob Squire
2016	(Australia) Lachlan Morton	(Canada) Jordan Cheyne	(United States) Taylor Shelden
2017	(United States) Travis McCabe	(Canada) Nigel Ellsay	(Canada) James Piccoli
2018	(Canada) Nickolas Zukowsky	(Canada) Anton Varabei	(Canada) Marc-Antoine Nadon
2019	(Romania) Serghei Tvetcov	(Canada) Nickolas Zukowsky	(Canada) Adam Roberge
2020-2021	Cancelled		
2022	(United States) Tyler Stites	(United States) Zach Gregg	(New Zealand) Alexander White
2023	(United States) Tyler Stites	(South Africa) Reinardt Janse van Rensburg	(United States) Richard Arnopol
2024	(United States) Brendan Rhim	(United States) Kellen Caldwell	(United States) Patrick Welch
2025	(United States) Patrick Welch	(United States) Carson Mattern	(United States) Elouan Gardon

=== Women ===
Year	Winner	Second	Third
1994	(United States) Rebecca Twigg	(United States) Molly Renner	(United States) Pamela Schuster
1995–1999	?		
2000	(United States) Katrina Berger	(Canada) Sophie St-Jacques	(United States) Ann Schelert
2001	(Canada) Geneviève Jeanson	(United States) Gabriela Ferrat	(United States) Amy Vinik
2002	(Canada) Geneviève Jeanson	(France) Jeannie Longo	(United States) Elizabeth Emery
2003–2008	?		
2009	(United States) Janel Holcomb	(United States) Melissa Mcwhirter	(United States) Rebecca Much
2010	(United States) Rebecca Much	(United States) Susannah Gordon	(United States) Tayler Wiles
2011	(Canada) Cara Bussell	(United States) Alisha Welsh	(Australia) Marilyn Mcdonald
2012	(United States) Alisha Welsh	(Saint Kitts and Nevis) Kathryn Bertine	(United States) Sabrina Forbes
2013	(Canada) Leah Kirchmann	(United States) Julie Cutts	(United States) Jessica Prinner
2014	(United States) Janel Holcomb	(Canada) Denise Ramsden	(United States) Lauren Hall
2015	(United States) Anna Sanders	(United States) Erica Allar	(United States) Jannalyn Luttrell
2016	(United States) Scotti Lechuga	(United States) Anna Sanders	(United States) Kimberly Lucie
2017	(Canada) Kirsti Lay	(Canada) Sara Bergen	(Canada) Marie-Soleil Blais
2018	(United States) Jennifer Luebke	(Mexico) Brenda Santoyo	(Canada) Marie-Soleil Blais
2019	(Canada) Marie-Soleil Blais	(United States) Erin Huck	(United Kingdom) Harriet Owen
2020–2021	Cancelled		
2022	(Canada) Ariane Bonhomme	(Canada) Maggie Coles-Lyster	(New Zealand) Rylee McMullen
2023	(United States) Kira Payer	(United States) Florence Howden	(United States) Mallory MacRostie
2024	(Mexico) Sofía Arreola	(France) Cécile Lejeune	(Canada) Julie Lacourcière
2025	(United States) Anna Hicks	(Mexico) Sofía Arreola	(United States) Emily Ehrlich
