= Alexander Cataford =

Canadian racing cyclist

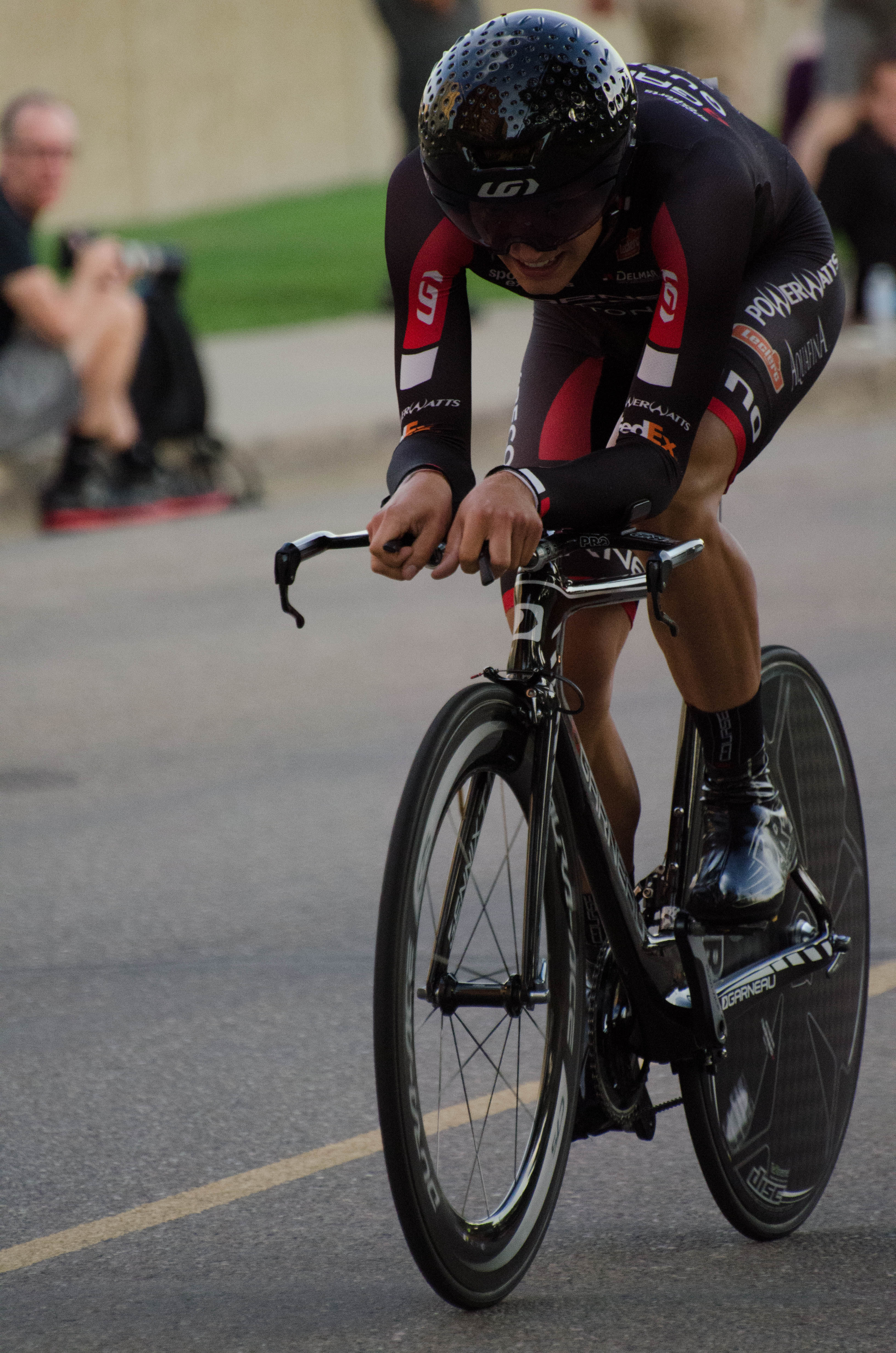
- Cataford at the 2013 Tour of Alberta.

Personal information
- Full name: Alexander Cataford
- Born: 1 September 1993 (age 33) Ottawa, Ontario, Canada
- Height: 1.82 m (6 ft 0 in)
- Weight: 69 kg (152 lb)

Cycling career
- Sport: Cycling
- Current team: NSN Cycling Team
- Discipline: Road
- Role: Rider
- Rider type: Time trialist

Amateur team
- 2012: Burnaby

Professional teams
- 2013: Team Québecor Garneau
- 2014: Amore & Vita–Selle SMP
- 2015–2016: Silber Pro Cycling Team
- 2017–2018: UnitedHealthcare
- 2019–2022: Israel Cycling Academy

Alexander Cataford (born 1 September 1993) is a Canadian racing cyclist. He won the Under-23 title at the 2013 Canadian National Time Trial Championships. He is a six-time Canadian Junior National Champion. In 2011, he was the Junior Pan American Champion in individual pursuit.

For the 2014 season, Cataford joined the Amore & Vita–Selle SMP team. In October 2020, he was named in the startlist for the 2020 Giro d'Italia.

== Personal life ==
Cataford was born in Ottawa, Ontario. He attended Queen's University where he graduated with a degree in physics.

== Major results ==
2011
1st Time trial, National Junior Road Championships
2013
National Road Championships

1st Under-23 time trial
3rd Time trial

2015
8th Overall Grand Prix Cycliste de Saguenay
9th Time trial, Pan American Under-23 Road Championships
2016
2nd Time trial, National Road Championships
2nd Overall Tour of the Gila
5th Overall Tour of Alberta
5th Overall Grand Prix Cycliste de Saguenay
9th Overall Tour de Beauce
2017
10th Overall Joe Martin Stage Race
2018
3rd Time trial, National Road Championships
3rd Overall Tour of Taihu Lake
10th Overall Colorado Classic

=== Grand Tour general classification results timeline ===
Grand Tour	2020	2021	2022
Giro d'Italia	DNF	—	101
Tour de France	—	—	—
Vuelta a España	—	DNF	—

Legend
—	Did not compete
DNF	Did not finish
