= 2026 UCI Road World Championships – Mixed team relay =

Cycling event

Mixed team relay
2026 UCI Road World Championships

Race details
- Dates: 22 September 2026
- Distance: 40.6 km (25.2 mi)
- Winning time: 51:32.28

Medalists
	Gold	Italy
	Silver	France
	Bronze	Switzerland

The mixed team relay of the 2026 UCI Road World Championships was a cycling event that took place on 22 September 2026 in Montreal, Canada. It was won by Italy.

== Final classification ==
Rank	Riders	Team	Time	Behind
1st place, gold medalist(s)	Mattia Cattaneo; Filippo Ganna; Matteo Sobrero; Vittoria Guazzini; Elisa Longo Borghini; Monica Trinca Colonel	Italy	51:32.28	–
2nd place, silver medalist(s)	Bruno Armirail; Rémi Cavagna; Jordan Labrosse; Juliette Berthet; Cédrine Kerbaol; Marion Borras	France	51:40.91	+8.63
3rd place, bronze medalist(s)	Stefan Bissegger; Stefan Küng; Jasmin Liechti; Marlen Reusser; Noemi Rüegg; Mauro Schmid	Switzerland	51:52.18	+19.90
4	Conor Leahy; Michael Matthews; Cameron Rogers; Georgia Baker; Mackenzie Coupland; Felicity Wilson-Haffenden	Australia	52:12.76	+40.48
5	Nikias Arndt; Jasha Sutterlin; Max Walscheid; Ricarda Bauernfeind; Franziska Koch; Antonia Niedermaier	Germany	52:21.02	+48.74
6	Héctor Álvarez; Iván Romeo; Eñaut Urkaregi; Sandra Alonso; Mireia Benito; Paula Blasi	Spain	52:43.05	+1:10.77
7	Tobias Foss; Andreas Leknessund; Embret Svestad-Bårdseng; Marte Berg Edseth; Oda Aune Gissinger; Sigrid Ytterhus Haugset	Norway	53:21.58	+1:49.30
8	Patryk Goszczurny; Jan Jackowiak; Michał Kwiatkowski; Nadia Harman; Maja Tracka; Dominika Włodarczyk	Poland	53:21.66	+1:49.38
9	Pier-André Côté; Michael Leonard; Nickolas Zukowsky; Olivia Baril; Nadia Gontova; Alison Jackson	Canada	53:39.96	+2:07.68
10	Oliver Mätik; Romet Pajur; Frank Aron Ragilo; Elisabeth Ebras; Laura Lizette Sander; Ann-Christine Allik	Estonia	54:58.15	+3:25.87
11	Cao Houwang; Li You; Zhao Chenli; Dong Haixin; Tang Xin; Zhu Shimeng	China	56:40.70	+5:08.42
12	Alexandre Mayer; Jeremy Raboude; Daniel Yon Hin; Camille Chasteau de Balyon; Lucie de Marigny-Lagesse; Kimberley Le Court	Mauritius	57:16.25	+5:43.97
13	Amir Ansari; Mario Sánchez (BOL); Ahmad Wais; Nesrine Houili (ALG); Jazilla Mwamikazi (RWA); Natalie Revelo (ECU)	World Cycling Centre	57:19.82	+5:47.24
14	Tomas Aguirre; Ignacio Prado; Sebastián Ruiz; Romina Hinojosa; Andrea Ramírez; Lizbeth Salazar	Mexico	57:41.84	+6:09.56
15	Jo Hashikawa; Taito Shindo; Isshin Yamasato; Karin Abe; Ayana Mizutani; Rena Tanaka	Japan	58:15.13	+6:42.85
