= Alec Cowan =

Canadian cyclist

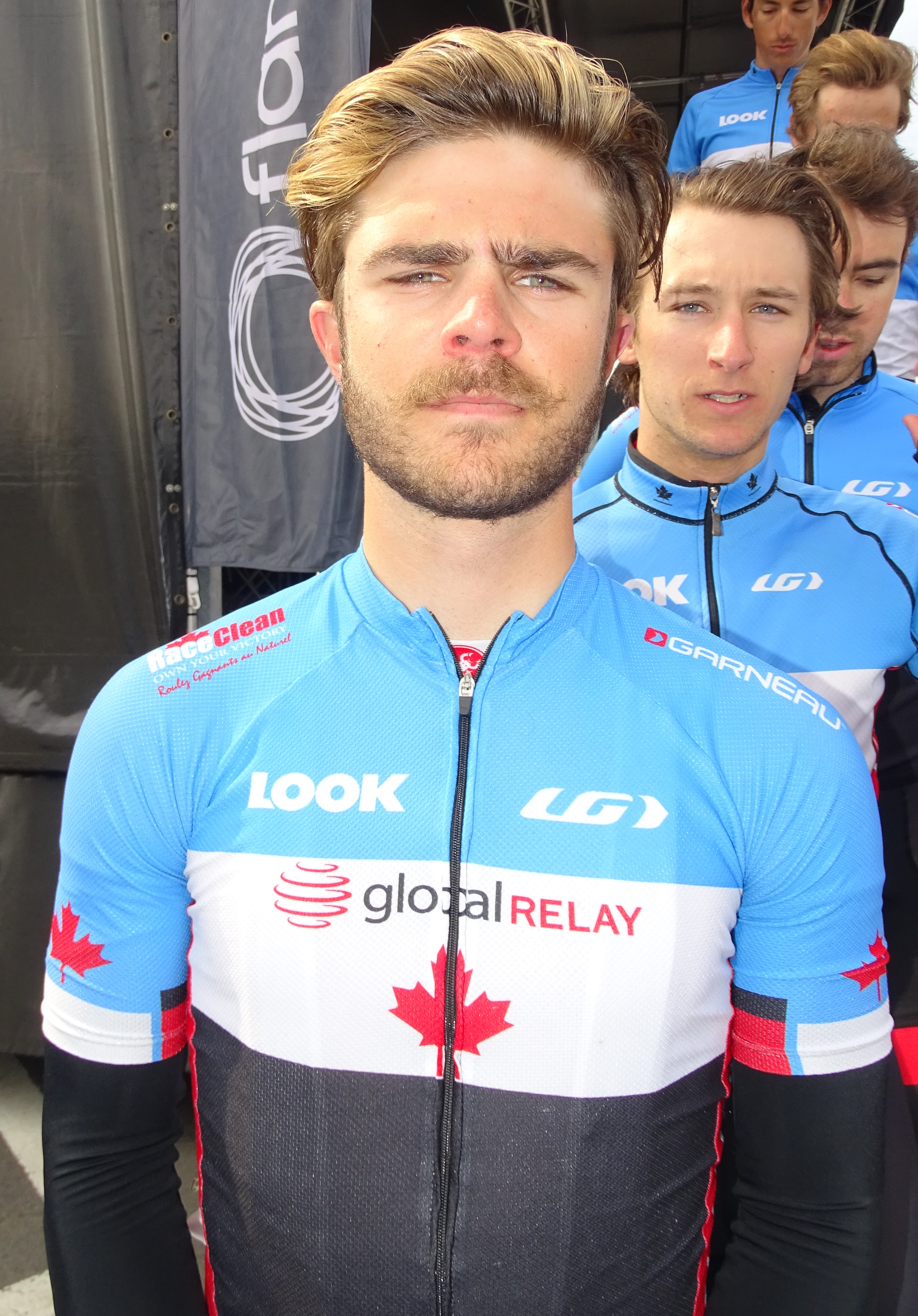
- Cowan in 2016

Personal information
- Full name: Alexander Cowan
- Nickname: Alec
- Born: November 19, 1996 (age 29) Calgary, Alberta, Canada

Cycling career
- Sport: Cycling
- Current team: L39ION of Los Angeles
- Discipline: Road
- Role: Rider
- Rider type: All-rounder

Amateur teams
- 2014: Canadian World Junior (U19) Track Cycling Team
- 2014: Team Alberta Provincial Road Team
- 2015–2016: Team Race Clean/U23 Canada

Professional teams
- 2017–2018: Silber Pro Cycling Team
- 2019: Floyd's Pro Cycling
- 2020: Wildlife Generation Pro Cycling
- 2021–: L39ION of Los Angeles

Alexander Cowan (born November 19, 1996) is a Canadian cyclist, who currently rides for UCI Continental team L39ION of Los Angeles. On January 2, 2017, Cowan was awarded Pedal Magazine's 2016 Cycling Award for Best Canadian Road Senior/U23 Cyclist (Male or Female).

== Career ==
In 2015 and 2016, Cowan rode for Team Race Clean, racing under the banner of Cycling Canada's anti-doping program. The program was launched in 2015 by Cycling Canada as Team NextGen. The team was built off of a select roster of Canadian under-23 riders who train and compete together throughout the year.

Cowan placed 12th in the under-23 time trial at the 2016 UCI Road World Championships, the best result by a Canadian in the event since David Veilleux in 2009. Cowan placed sixth in the 2016 Canadian National Time Trial Championships in a field that included Hugo Houle, Svein Tuft, Michael Woods, Rob Britton and Ryan Roth. In May 2016, Cowan was awarded the Most Aggressive Rider jersey after Stage 1 of the Tour of Berlin, and the best young rider jersey after Stage 2 of the Tour de la Manche.

In 2017, Cowan had seven "top ten" placings in UCI races including a Time Trial win in Stage 3a at the Tour de Beauce.

== Personal life ==
Cowan is bilingual in English and French.

== Major results ==
2014
1st Criterium, National Road Championships
2016
National Road Championships

1st Under-23 time trial
6th Time trial

6th Eschborn–Frankfurt Under–23
9th Tour de la Manche
2017
1st Mountains classification Tour of Alberta
1st Stage 3a (ITT) Tour de Beauce
7th Time trial, National Road Championships
2018
7th Overall Joe Martin Stage Race

1st Stage 2

2019
1st Stage 1 Cascade Cycling Classic
5th Overall Joe Martin Stage Race

1st Stage 4

5th Overall Redlands Bicycle Classic
