= Nigel Ellsay =

Canadian cyclist

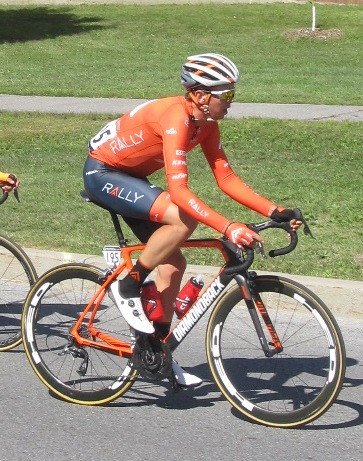
- Ellsay in 2018

Personal information
- Full name: Nigel Ellsay
- Born: 30 April 1994 (age 32) Courtenay, British Columbia

Cycling career
- Sport: Cycling
- Current team: Retired
- Discipline: Road
- Role: Rider

Amateur teams
- 2012: VCC Morteau–Montbenoît Junior
- 2013–2014: Sojasun espoir–ACNC
- 2014: Silber Pro Cycling Team (stagiaire)

Professional teams
- 2015–2017: Silber Pro Cycling Team
- 2018–2020: Rally Cycling

Nigel Ellsay (born 30 April 1994 in Courtenay, British Columbia) is a Canadian former professional cyclist, who rode professionally between 2015 and 2020, for the Silber Pro Cycling Team and Rally Cycling teams. In 2018, Ellsay won bronze at the Canadian National Road Race Championships.

== Major results ==
2011
2nd Time trial, National Junior Road Championships
2012
1st Time trial, National Junior Road Championships
2013
9th Tour de Delta
2014
2nd Time trial, National Under-23 Road Championships
7th White Spot / Delta Road Race
2016
2nd Overall Joe Martin Stage Race
7th Overall Tour of Alberta
2017
1st Mountains classification Tour de Beauce
2nd Time trial, National Road Championships
7th Overall Cascade Cycling Classic
7th Overall Joe Martin Stage Race
10th Overall Tour of Alberta
2018
3rd Road race, National Road Championships
2019
2nd Road race, National Road Championships
9th Overall Tour de Beauce
