= Scott Price =

Scott Price may refer to:

- Scott Price (cyclist) (born 1969), Canadian cyclist
- Scott Price (politician) (born 1962), politician from the U.S. state of Nebraska
