= 2024 UCI Road World Championships – Mixed team relay =

Cycling event

Mixed team relay
2024 UCI Road World Championships

Race details
- Dates: 25 September 2024
- Distance: 53.7 km (33.37 mi)
- Winning time: 1:12:52.28

Medalists
	Gold	Australia
	Silver	Germany
	Bronze	Italy

The mixed team relay of the 2024 UCI Road World Championships was a cycling event that took place on 25 September 2024 in Zurich, Switzerland. It was won by Australia.

== Final classification ==
Rank	Riders	Team	Time	Behind
1st place, gold medalist(s)	Michael Matthews; Ben O'Connor; Jay Vine; Grace Brown; Brodie Chapman; Ruby Roseman-Gannon	Australia	1:12:52.28	–
2nd place, silver medalist(s)	Marco Brenner; Miguel Heidemann; Maximilian Schachmann; Franziska Koch; Liane Lippert; Antonia Niedermaier	Germany	1:12:53.13	+0.85
3rd place, bronze medalist(s)	Edoardo Affini; Mattia Cattaneo; Filippo Ganna; Elisa Longo Borghini; Soraya Paladin; Gaia Realini	Italy	1:13:00.53	+8.25
4	Bruno Armirail; Thibault Guernalec; Benjamin Thomas; Audrey Cordon-Ragot; Cédrine Kerbaol; Juliette Labous	France	1:13:16.11	+23.83
5	Mikkel Bjerg; Mikkel Frølich Honoré; Magnus Cort Nielsen; Emma Norsgaard; Rebecca Koerner; Cecilie Ludwig	Denmark	1:14:58.80	+2:06.52
6	Brandon McNulty; Neilson Powless; Kevin Vermaerke; Emily Ehrlich; Amber Neben; Lauren Stephens	United States	1:15:09.09	+2:16.81
7	Pier-André Côté; Derek Gee; Jonas Walton; Olivia Baril; Ava Holmgren; Mara Roldan	Canada	1:15:34.32	+2:42.04
8	Stefan Bissegger; Johan Jacobs; Fabian Weiss; Elise Chabbey; Jasmin Liechti; Noemi Rüegg	Switzerland	1:15:44.01	+2:51.73
9	Markel Beloki; David de la Cruz; Raúl García Pierna; Mireia Benito Pellicer; Paula Blasi; Eneritz Vadillo	Spain	1:16:42.58	+3:50.30
10	Philipp Hofbauer; Felix Ritzinger; Adrian Stieger; Carina Schrempf; Christina Schweinberger; Kathrin Schweinberger	Austria	1:17:43.61	+4:51.33
11	Vitaliy Hryniv; Semen Simon; Daniil Yakovlev; Yuliia Biriukova; Olha Kulynych; Olga Shekel	Ukraine	1:19:52.05	+6:59.77
12	Rait Ärm; Madis Mihkels; Norman Vahtra; Laura Lizette Sander; Elina Tasane; Aidi Gerde Tuisk	Estonia	1:21:21.88	+8:29.60
13	Awet Aman (ERI); Amir Arslan Ansari; Yafiet Mulugeta (ERI); Nika Bobnar (SLO); Eyeru Tesfoam Gebru; Lize-Ann Louw (RSA)	World Cycling Centre	1:23:31.38	+10:39.10
14	Li Zhen; Lyu Xianjing; Miao Chengshuo; Tang Xin; Zeng Luyao; Zhou Qiuying	China	1:23:39.69	+10:47.34
15	Tegshbayar Batsaikhan; Temuulen Khadbaatar; Jambaljamts Sainbayar; Enkhmaa Enkhtur; Anujin Jinjiibadam; Solongo Tserenlkham	Mongolia	1:25:21.27	+12:28.99
16	Martin Papanov; Yordan Petrov; Emil Stoynev; Petya Minkova; Gergana Stoyanova; Ivana Tonkova	Bulgaria	1:25:28.66	+12:36.38
17	Jonathan Caicedo; Joffre Imbaquingo; Anderson Palma; Miryam Núñez; Marcela Penafiel; Natalia Vásquez Amaya	Ecuador	1:26:46.96	+13:54.68
18	Vainqueur Masengesho; Samuel Niyonkuru; Etienne Tuyizere; Diane Ingabire; Xaveline Nirere; Valentine Nzayisenga	Rwanda	1:27:19.77	+14:27.49
