= Ryan Roth =

Canadian cyclist

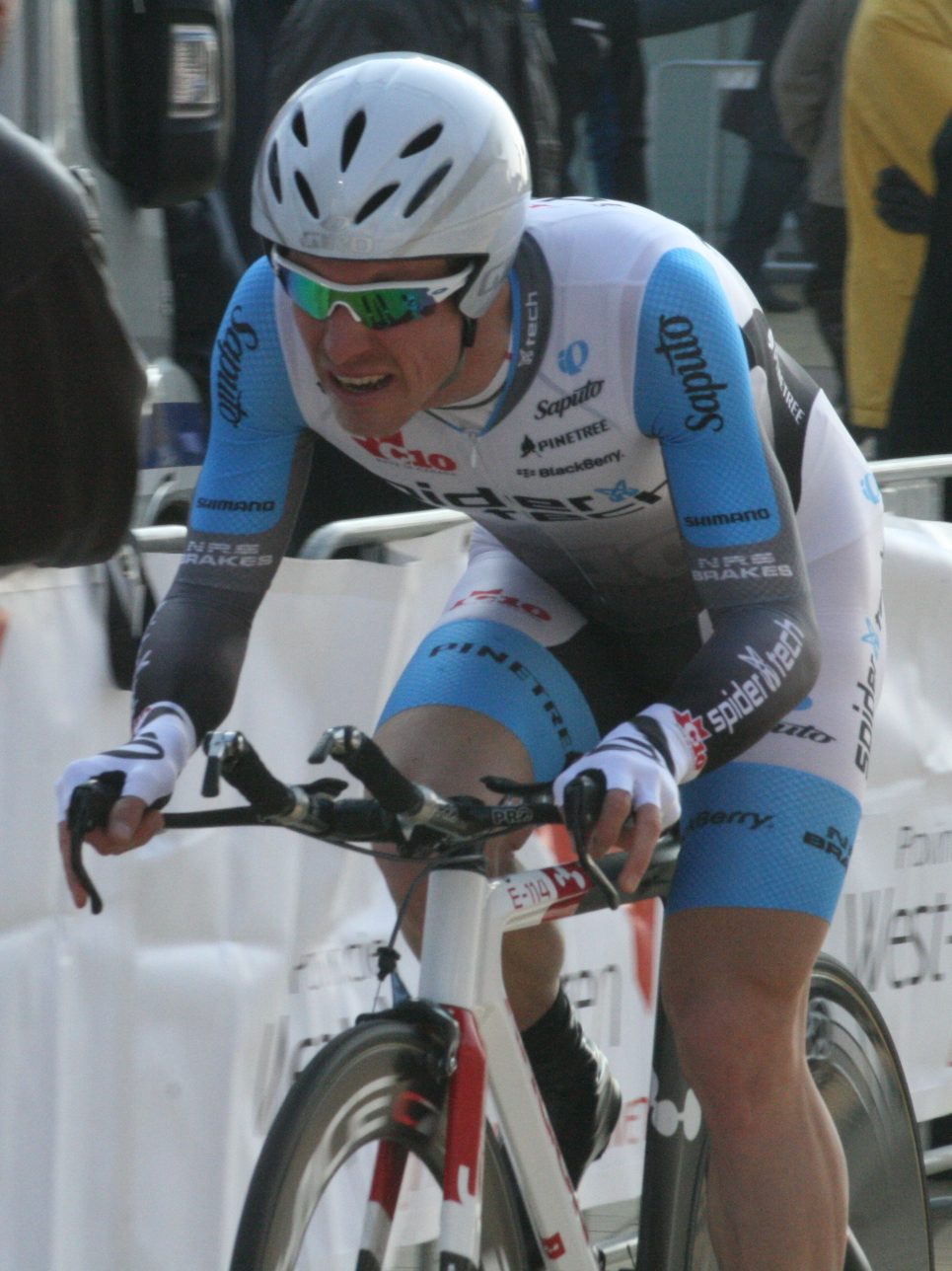
- Roth at the 2011 Driedaagse van West-Vlaanderen

Personal information
- Full name: Ryan Roth
- Born: 10 January 1983 (age 43) Kitchener, Ontario
- Height: 1.75 m (5 ft 9 in)
- Weight: 71 kg (157 lb)

Cycling career
- Sport: Cycling
- Current team: Retired
- Disciplines: Road; Cyclo-cross; Mountain biking
- Role: Rider
- Rider type: All-rounder

Amateur teams
- 2014: Jet Fuel Cycling/Norco Bicycles
- 2020: Hamilton United

Professional teams
- 2002–2004: Sympatico–Jet Fuel Coffee
- 2007: Kelly Benefit Strategies–Medifast
- 2008–2012: Team R.A.C.E. Pro
- 2013: Champion System
- 2014–2018: Silber Pro Cycling Team
- 2019: X-Speed United

Major wins
- National Time Trial Championships (2016); National Road Race Championships (2012); Tro-Bro Léon (2012)

Ryan Roth (born 10 January 1983) is a Canadian former professional road bicycle racer, who rode professionally between 2002 and 2019. Prior to becoming a road cyclist, Roth also competed in the junior levels in mountain-biking and cyclo-cross; he was national junior cyclo-cross champion in 2000.

== Career ==
Born in Kitchener, Ontario, Roth competed as a professional from 2002, making his début with the Sympatico–Jet Fuel Coffee team. After a short stint with the Kelly Benefit Strategies–Medifast team, Roth competed for the SpiderTech–C10 team from its formation as a professional team at the start of 2008, when it was known as Team R.A.C.E. Pro. Having featured highly in several North and Central American races during his career, Roth won his first UCI Europe Tour race in April 2012, by winning the Tro-Bro Léon race. Roth soloed to victory in Lannilis after catching the breakaway and went clear of them, finishing thirteen seconds clear of his nearest rival, Benoit Jarrier of Véranda Rideau U. It was the first non-French victory in the race since Mark Renshaw in 2006, and was his team's first victory of the year. Roth also won the 2012 Canadian National Road Race Championships.

== Major results ==
2000
1st Junior race, National Cyclo-cross Championships
2004
1st Overall Multi Laser GP
1st Classic Chlorophylle
4th Univest Grand Prix
2005
National Under-23 Road Championships

1st Road race
2nd Time trial

1st Overall Jewel in the Wilderness

1st Stages 1 & 2

2006
1st Overall Jewel in the Wilderness

1st Stages 1a & 2

1st Classique Montréal-Québec Louis Garneau
2007
2nd Univest Grand Prix
2nd Tour de Leelanau
2008
1st Stage 11 International Cycling Classic
2nd Time trial, National Road Championships
2nd KW Classic
3rd Overall Rochester Omnium

1st Stage 1 (ITT)

3rd Copperas Cove Classic
2009
1st Niagara Classic
2nd Overall Jewel in the Wilderness

1st Stages 1 & 2

6th Time trial, Pan American Road Championships
6th Overall Vuelta a Cuba
2010
1st Niagara Classic
2nd Chrono Gatineau
3rd Time trial, National Road Championships
4th Overall Vuelta a Cuba

1st Stage 7a (ITT)

8th Overall Tour de Beauce
10th Time trial, Commonwealth Games
2011
1st Univest Grand Prix
2012
1st Road race, National Road Championships
1st Tro-Bro Léon
8th Overall Tour de Beauce
2014
National Road Championships

2nd Road race
3rd Time trial

7th Winston-Salem Cycling Classic
8th Overall Grand Prix Cycliste de Saguenay
8th Philadelphia International Championship
9th Overall Tour de Beauce
2015
National Road Championships

2nd Time trial
3rd Road race

2nd Overall Grand Prix Cycliste de Saguenay
5th Overall Tour de Beauce
6th White Spot / Delta Road Race
8th Philadelphia International Cycling Classic
2016
1st Time trial, National Road Championships
1st Overall Grand Prix Cycliste de Saguenay
1st Winston-Salem Cycling Classic
1st White Spot / Delta Road Race
2017
2nd Winston-Salem Cycling Classic
2019
6th Overall Tour de Iskandar Johor

1st Points classification
1st Stage 1

2nd Stage 1 Tour of Indonesia
1st Stage 10 Tour of Poyang Lake
2nd Stage 1 Tour of Poyang Lake
1st Canadian National Criterium, National Road Championships
