= Adam Roberge =

Canadian cyclist

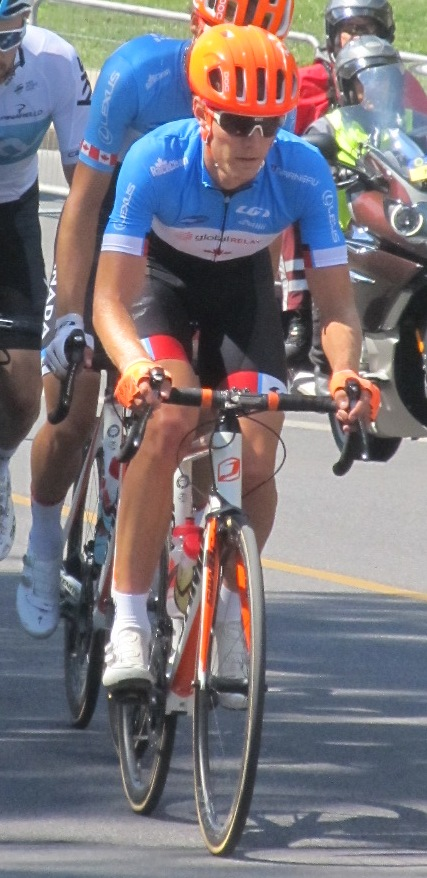
- Roberge in a breakaway at the 2018 Grand Prix Cycliste de Montréal

Personal information
- Born: 27 March 1997 (age 29) Montreal, Quebec, Canada
- Height: 1.92 m (6 ft 4 in)
- Weight: 72 kg (159 lb)

Cycling career
- Sport: Cycling
- Current team: Jukebox Cycling
- Discipline: Road
- Role: Rider
- Rider type: Rouleur

Amateur teams
- 2016: LowestRates
- 2016: Team RaceClean
- 2022–: Jukebox Cycling

Professional teams
- 2017–2018: Silber Pro Cycling Team
- 2019–2021: Elevate–KHS Pro Cycling

Adam Roberge (born 27 March 1997) is a Canadian cyclist, who currently rides for Jukebox Cycling, a multi-discipline team of six riders.

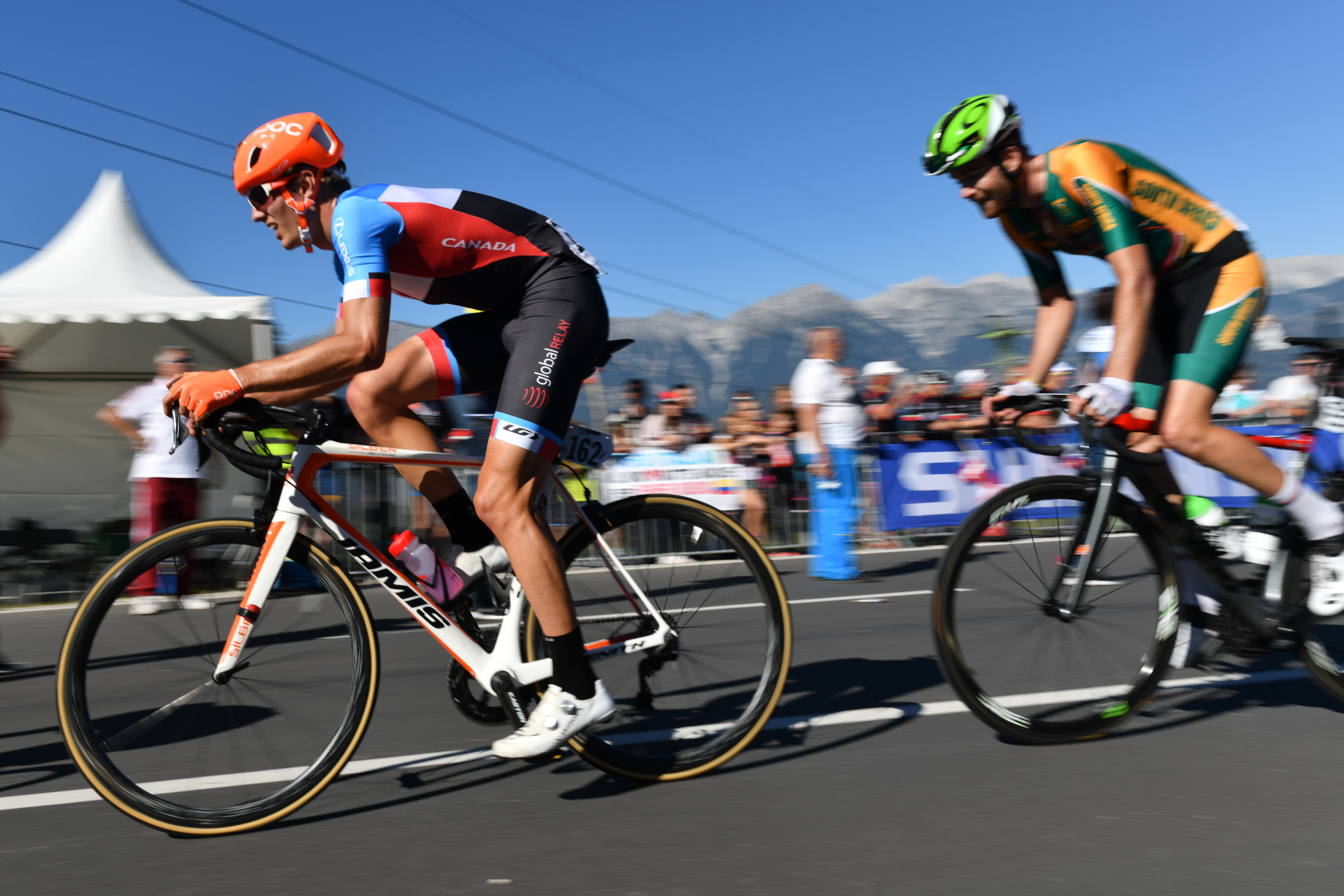
Roberge at the 2018 UCI Road World Championships

== Major results ==
2015
1st Road race, National Junior Road Championships
2016
3rd Time trial, National Under-23 Road Championships
2017
1st Time trial, National Under-23 Road Championships
1st Time trial, Canada Summer Games
4th Time trial, National Road Championships
2018
1st Time trial, National Under-23 Road Championships
4th Time trial, National Road Championships
2019
1st Time trial, National Under-23 Road Championships
3rd Time trial, National Road Championships
3rd Overall Tucson Bicycle Classic
4th Chrono Kristin Armstrong
6th Overall Grand Prix Cycliste de Saguenay
2021
4th Time trial, National Road Championships
4th Overall Joe Martin Stage Race
2022
5th Time trial, National Road Championships
