= Jonas Walton =

Canadian cyclist (born 2004)

Personal information
- Born: March 6, 2004 (age 22)
- Height: 1.80 m (5 ft 11 in)
- Weight: 68 kg (150 lb)

Cycling career
- Sport: Cycling
- Current team: Project Echelon Racing
- Discipline: Road
- Role: Rider

Amateur team
- 2021–2022: Hot Tubes Cycling

Professional teams
- 2023–2024: Team Ecoflo Chronos
- 2025–: Project Echelon Racing

Jonas Walton (born March 6, 2004) is a Canadian/American professional cyclist who rides for UCI Continental team Project Echelon Racing. In 2022, he broke the junior hour record. His father is Olympic silver medalist cyclist Brian Walton.

== Early life ==
Jonas Walton was a keen middle distance runner until injury forced him to pursue lower impact pursuits. He attended Belmont Abbey College in Belmont, North Carolina with a major in economics and a minor in Data Analytics.

== Career ==
Walton set a new the junior hour record with a distance of 50.792 km on October 17, 2022, in Aguascalientes, Mexico.

He rode on 2023 and 2024 on the Continental level with the Canadian Team Ecoflo Chronos. In 2024, he won the Canadian U23 time trial national championship and won pair of gold medals on the road at USA Cycling Collegiate nationals, winning both the Varsity criterium and individual time trial. He was part of the Canadian team that finished seventh in the Mixed team relay at the 2024 UCI Road World Championships. He was also selected for the U23 road race and U23 individual time trial.

Ahead of the 2025 season he signed to ride for UCI Continental team Project Echelon Racing.

== Personal life ==
His parents are Dana Gygory Walton, an eight time world champion at UCI Masters Track World Championships, and former Canadian road race champion and Olympic medalist Brian Walton. He has dual citizenship of the USA and Canada.

== Major results ==
2021
1st Stage 1 (TTT) Vuelta Junior a la Ribera del Duer
2022
3rd Time trial, American National Junior Road Championships
9th Overall Tour de DMZ
2023
3rd Time trial, Canadian National Under-23 Road Championships
3rd Chrono des Nations Under-23
2024
1st Time trial, Canadian National Under-23 Road Championships
4th Overall Tour of the Gila

1st Young rider classification

2025
6th Time trial, UCI Road World Under-23 Championships
