= Nickolas Zukowsky =

Canadian road cyclist

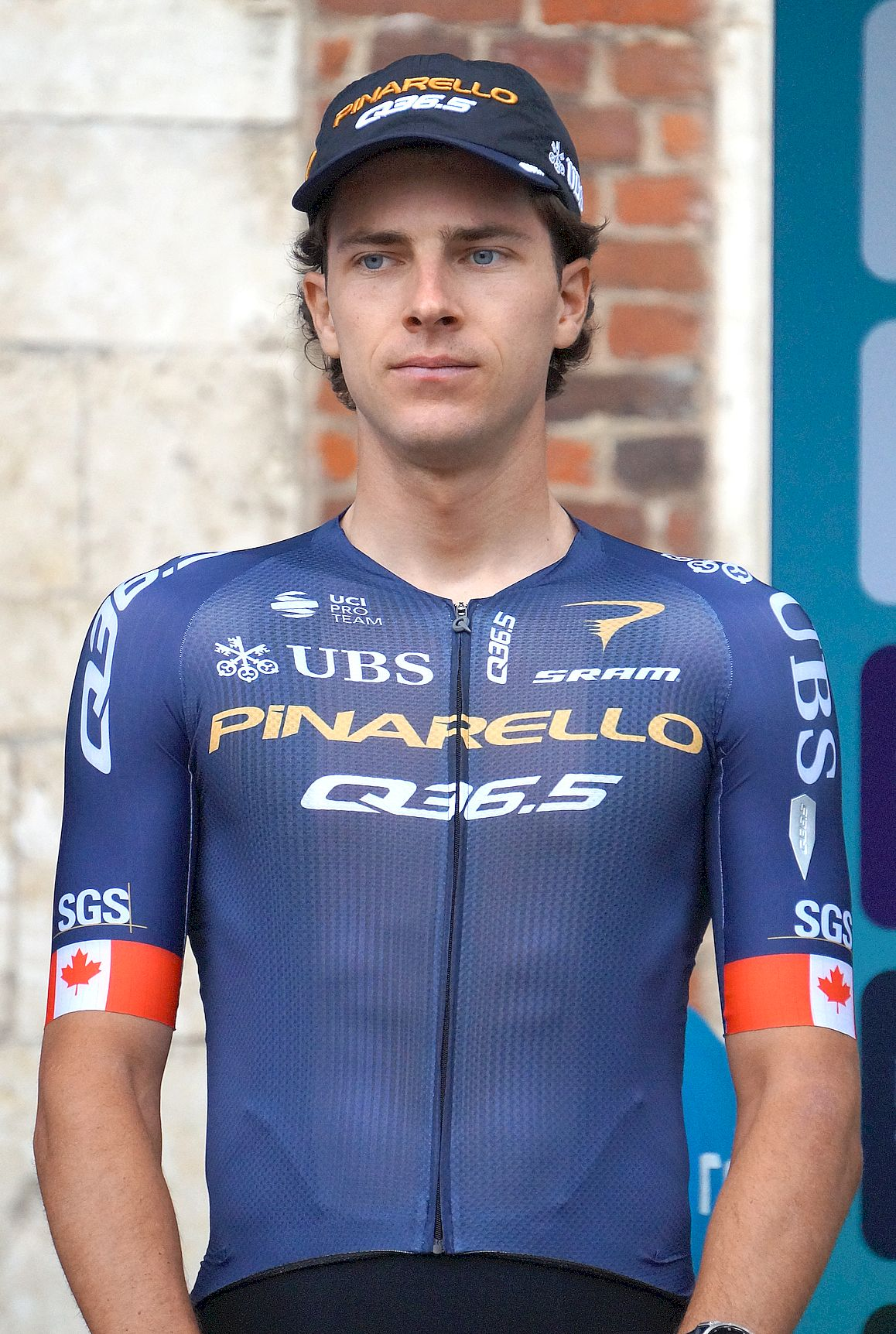
- Zukowsky in 2026

Personal information
- Full name: Nickolas Zukowsky
- Born: 3 June 1998 (age 28) Sainte-Lucie-des-Laurentides, Quebec, Canada
- Height: 6 ft 1 in (1.85 m)

Cycling career
- Sport: Cycling
- Current team: Pinarello–Q36.5 Pro Cycling Team
- Discipline: Road
- Role: Rider
- Rider type: All-rounder

Professional teams
- 2017–2018: Silber Pro Cycling Team
- 2019: Floyd's Pro Cycling
- 2020–2022: Rally Cycling
- 2023–: Q36.5 Pro Cycling Team

Nickolas Zukowsky (born 3 June 1998) is a Canadian professional racing cyclist, who currently rides for UCI ProTeam Pinarello–Q36.5 Pro Cycling Team.

== Career ==
In 2016, Zukowsky began his professional cycling career independently despite not owning a road bike the year prior. He placed fourth overall in the Tour de l'Abitibi, won a stage of the Ronde des Vallées, and finished fifth in the Killington Stage Race's first stage. He also competed in the Canadian National Junior Road Race Championships, placing third. Silber Pro Cycling Team signed Zukowsky following the 2016 cycling season, making him the first 18-year-old to be on the team.

In 2017, Zukowsky gained his first win in his cycling career, winning first overall in the Tucson Bicycle Classic. After Silber Pro Cycling went defunct, he signed with Floyd's Pro Cycling.

2019 was a breakout year for Zukowsky, winning first in road race for the Canadian National Under-23 Road Championships, first overall for the Grand Prix Cycliste de Saguenay, along with other significant finishes such as third overall in the Tour de Beauce and the Tour of the Gila.

In 2020, Zukowsky signed with Rally Cycling but did not have any significant results that year. In 2021, he placed fourth overall in the Vuelta a Castilla y León.

In 2022, Zukowsky almost won his first UCI ProSeries race, the Maryland Cycling Classic, but was edged out by Belgian racer Sep Vanmarcke by less than a second to earn his first UCI ProSeries win. He also placed fourth in the Grand Prix Criquielion. After the 2022 cycling season, Zukowsky signed with the Q36.5 Pro Cycling Team.

In 2023, Zukowsky gained his first major national win by winning the road race in the Canadian National Road Championships.

== Major results ==
2016
3rd Time trial, Canadian National Junior Road Championships
4th Overall Tour de l'Abitibi
2017
2nd Time trial, Canadian National Under-23 Road Championships
4th Time trial, Canada Summer Games
5th Overall Tucson Bicycle Classic
2018
1st Overall Tucson Bicycle Classic
2nd Boise Twilight Criterium
2nd Time trial, Canadian National Under-23 Road Championships
8th Winston-Salem Cycling Classic
2019
1st Road race, Canadian National Under-23 Road Championships
1st Overall Grand Prix Cycliste de Saguenay

1st Points classification
1st Young rider classification

2nd Boise Twilight Criterium
2nd Overall Tucson Bicycle Classic
3rd Time trial, Canadian National Under-23 Road Championships
3rd Overall Tour de Beauce

1st Young rider classification

3rd Overall Tour of the Gila

1st Young rider classification

9th Chrono Kristin Armstrong
2021
4th Vuelta a Castilla y León
2022
2nd Maryland Cycling Classic
4th Grand Prix Criquielion
2023
1st Road race, Canadian National Road Championships
2nd Time trial, Canadian National Road Championships
10th Overall Vuelta a Castilla y León

=== Grand Tour general classification results timeline ===
Grand Tour	2025
Giro d'Italia	DNF
Tour de France	—
Vuelta a España	112

Legend
—	Did not compete
DNF	Did not finish
