= Gillian Ellsay =

Canadian cyclist

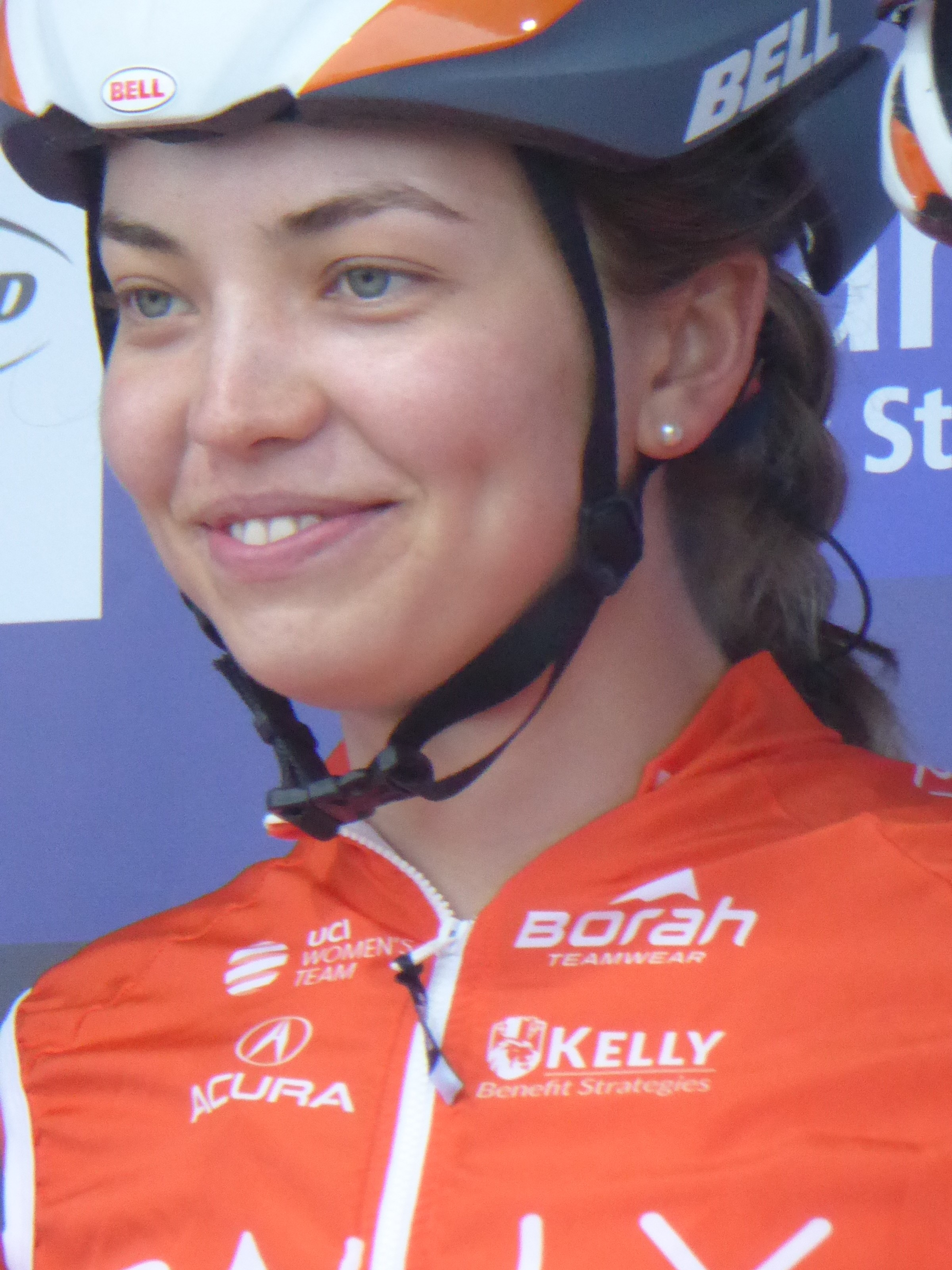
- Ellsay at the 2019 Women's Tour of Scotland

Personal information
- Full name: Gillian Ellsay
- Born: 26 March 1997 (age 29) Courtenay, British Columbia, Canada

Cycling career
- Sport: Cycling
- Current team: Cynisca Cycling
- Discipline: Road
- Role: Rider (retired); Directeur sportif

Professional teams
- 2017: Colavita/Bianchi
- 2018–2019: Rally Cycling
- 2020–2021: InstaFund La Prima

Managerial teams
- 2022–2023: TaG Cycling Race Team
- 2023–: Cynisca Cycling

Gillian Ellsay (born 26 March 1997) is a Canadian former professional racing cyclist, who rode professionally between 2017 and 2021 for UCI Women's Teams Colavita/Bianchi, Rally UHC Cycling and InstaFund Racing. In 2021, Ellsay finished third in the Canadian National Time Trial Championships.

Since 2023, Ellsay has worked as a directeur sportif for UCI Women's Continental Team Cynisca Cycling.

== Personal life ==
Her older brother Nigel Ellsay also competed professionally in cycling, between 2015 and 2020.
