= Pier-André Côté =

Canadian cyclist

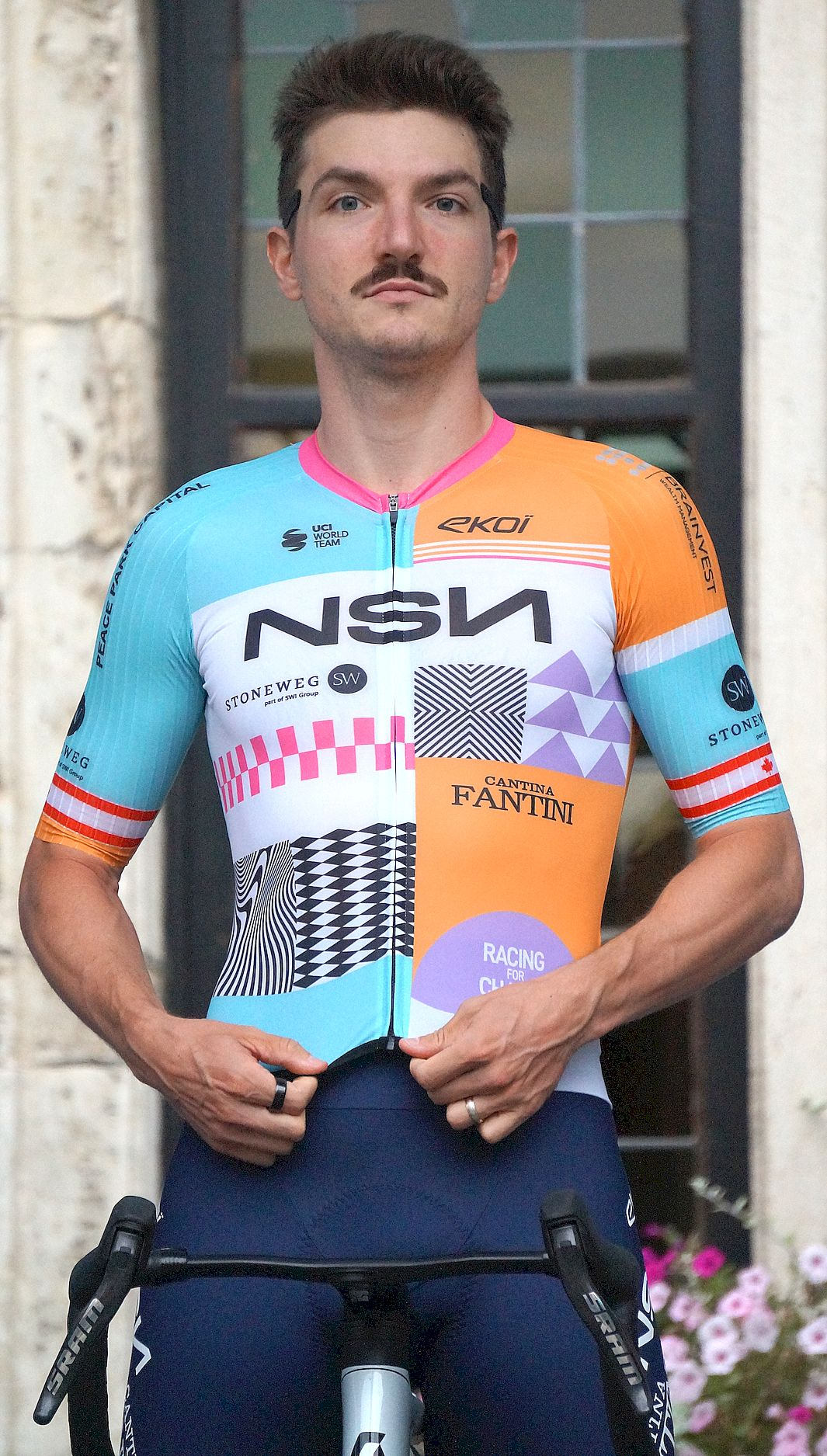
- Côté in 2026

Personal information
- Full name: Pier-André Côté
- Born: 24 April 1997 (age 29) Gaspé, Quebec, Canada
- Height: 1.81 m (5 ft 11 in)

Cycling career
- Sport: Cycling
- Current team: NSN Cycling Team
- Discipline: Road
- Role: Rider

Amateur team
- 2016: TRJ Télécom–Desjardins–Ford

Professional teams
- 2017–2018: Silber Pro Cycling Team
- 2019–2023: Rally UHC Cycling
- 2024: Israel Premier Tech Academy
- 2025–: Israel–Premier Tech

Major wins
- One-day races and Classics National Road Race Championships (2022) National Time Trial Championships (2024)
Medal record
Men's road bicycle racing
Representing Canada
Pan American Championships
Gold medal – first place	2023 Panama City	Road race

Pier-André Côté (born 24 April 1997) is a Canadian cyclist, who currently rides for UCI ProTeam NSN Cycling Team.

== Major results ==
2014
1st Time trial, National Junior Road Championships
2015
National Junior Road Championships

3rd Time trial
3rd Road race

4th Overall Tour de l'Abitibi

1st Stage 5

2017
Canada Summer Games

1st Criterium
1st Road race
2nd Time trial

National Road Championships

1st Criterium
3rd Road race

National Under-23 Road Championships

1st Criterium
2nd Road race

2018
Tour de Beauce

1st Stages 1 & 5

2019
5th White Spot / Delta Road Race
7th Overall Tour de Beauce
9th Overall Grand Prix Cycliste de Saguenay

1st Stages 2, 3 & 4

2021
6th Classic Loire Atlantique
9th Overall Tour Poitou-Charentes en Nouvelle-Aquitaine
2022 (1 pro win)
National Road Championships

1st Road race
3rd Time trial

1st Grand Prix Criquielion
8th Memorial Rik Van Steenbergen
2023 (1)
1st Road race, Pan American Road Championships
6th Druivenkoers Overijse
2024 (1)
National Road Championships

1st Time trial
2nd Road race

4th Classic Loire Atlantique
5th Overall CRO Race
5th Druivenkoers Overijse
8th Overall Circuit des Ardennes
10th Overall Tour of Belgium
2025
National Road Championships

3rd Time trial
4th Road race

9th Overall Tour of Belgium
10th Dwars door het Hageland
2026
3rd Time trial, National Road Championships
6th Overall Danmark Rundt

=== Grand Tour general classification results timeline ===
Grand Tour	2025
Giro d'Italia	—
Tour de France	—
Vuelta a España	108
