= Brian Walton =

Brian Walton may refer to:

- Brian Walton (bishop) (1600–1661), English divine and scholar
- Brian Walton (cyclist) (born 1965), Canadian cycling coach and former bicycle racer
