= Canadian National Time Trial Championships =

National road cycling championship in Canada

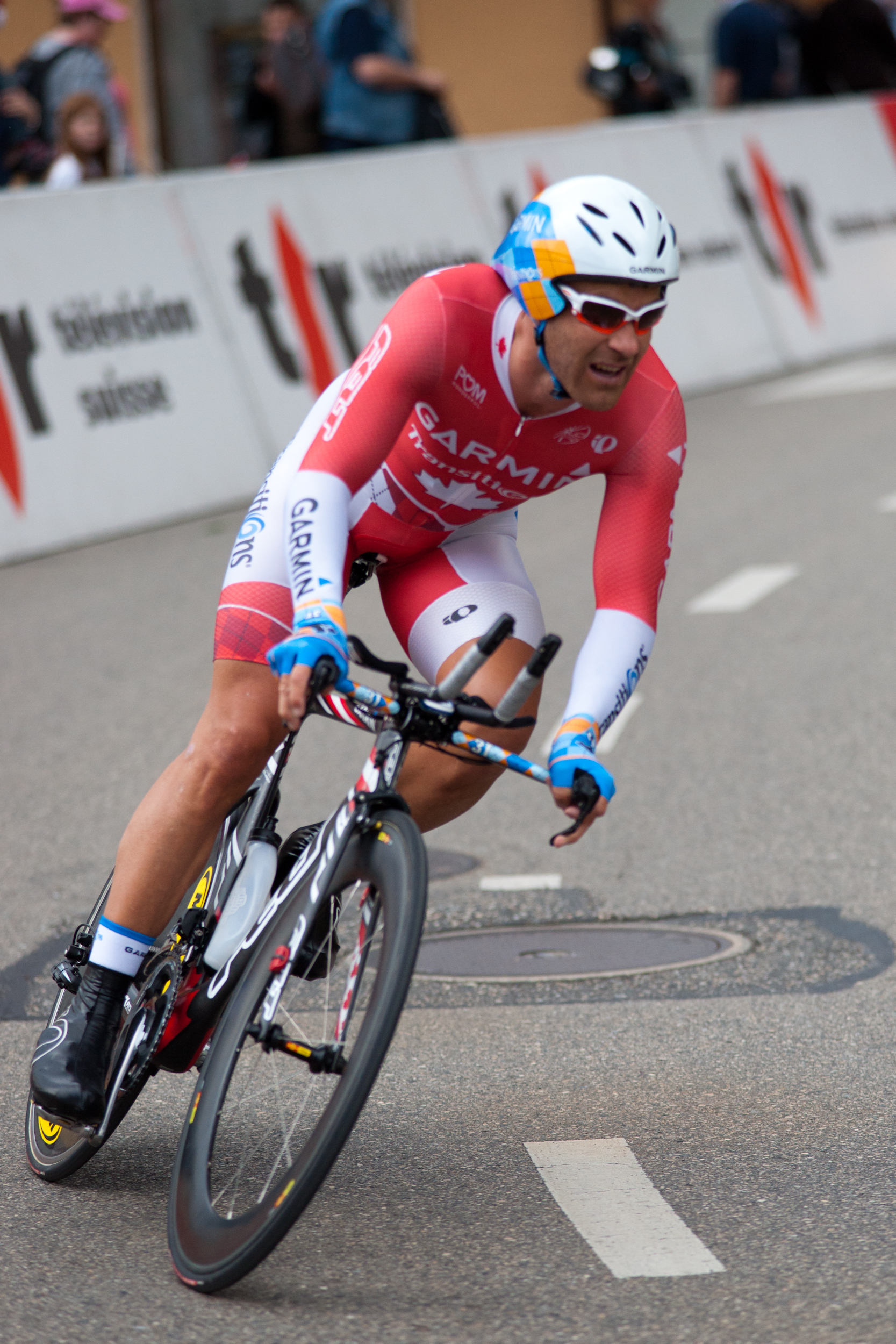
Svein Tuft

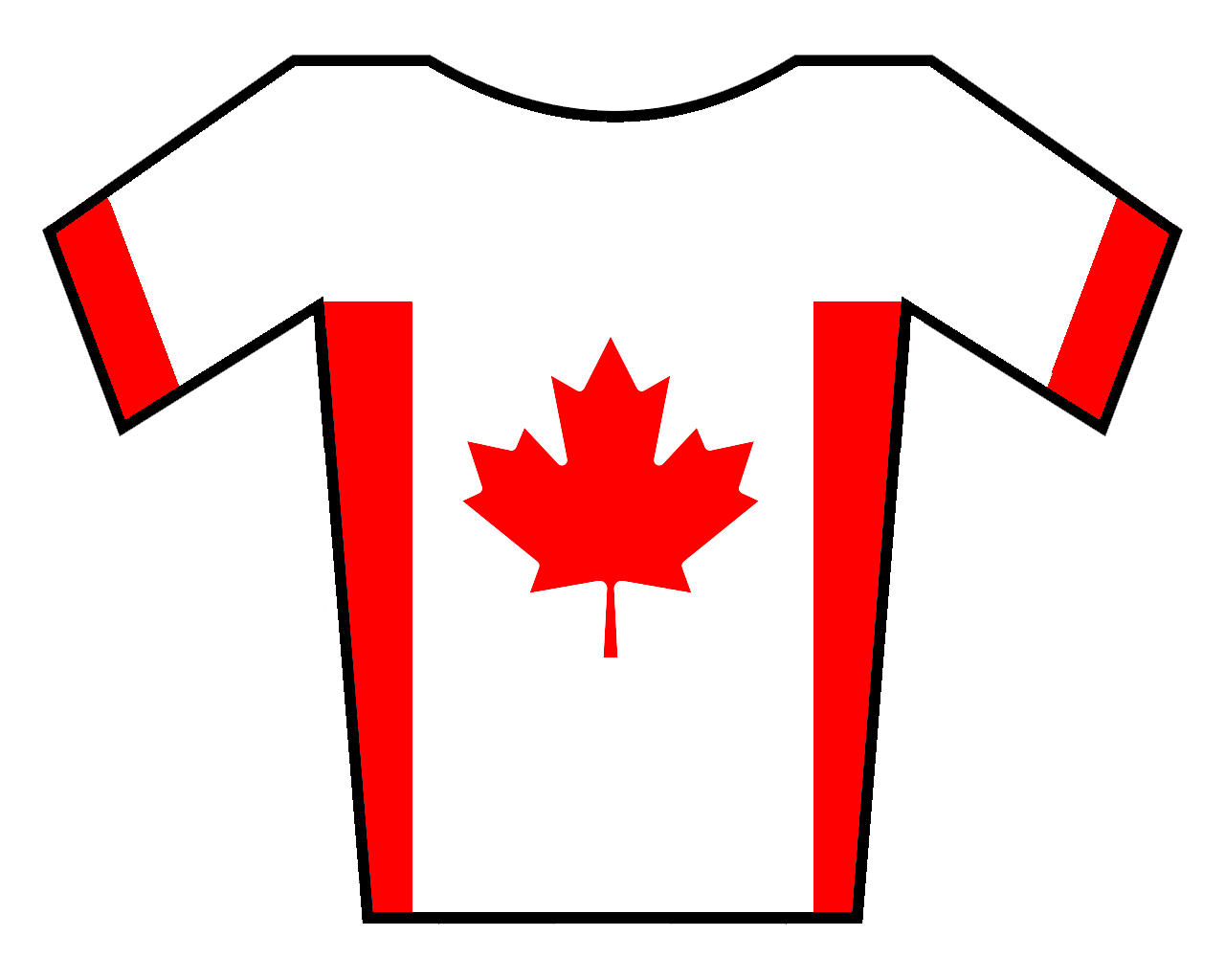
The champion's jersey

Governed by Cycling Canada, the Canadian National Time Trial Championship is a road bicycle race that takes place inside the Canadian National Cycling Championship, and decides the best cyclist in this type of race. Svein Tuft is the all-time Canadian record holder for the most wins in the event with 11 wins. The women's record is held by Clara Hughes with 5 national titles.

The 2025 elite champions of the race are Michael Leonard and Olivia Baril.

== Men ==
=== Elite ===
Year	Gold	Silver	Bronze
1995	Roland Green		
1997	Eric Wohlberg	Brian Walton	Jacques Landry
1998	Eric Wohlberg	Brian Walton	Jacques Landry
1999	Eric Wohlberg	Brian Walton	Peter Wedge
2000	Eric Wohlberg	Andrew Randell	Min Van Velzen
2001	Eric Wohlberg	Svein Tuft	Roland Green
2002	Eric Wohlberg	Alexandre Cloutier	Svein Tuft
2003	Eric Wohlberg	Svein Tuft	Jean-François Laroche
2004	Svein Tuft	Eric Wohlberg	Darko Ficko
2005	Svein Tuft	Eric Wohlberg	Ryder Hesjedal
2006	Svein Tuft	Ryder Hesjedal	Eric Wohlberg
2007	Ryder Hesjedal	Svein Tuft	Zachary Bell
2008	Svein Tuft	Ryan Roth	Zachary Bell
2009	Svein Tuft	Christian Meier	Zachary Bell
2010	Svein Tuft	Zachary Bell	Ryan Roth
2011	Svein Tuft	Christian Meier	David Veilleux
2012	Svein Tuft	Christian Meier	Aaron Fillion
2013	Curtis Dearden	Christian Meier	Zachary Bell
2014	Svein Tuft	Hugo Houle	Ryan Roth
2015	Hugo Houle	Ryan Roth	Christian Meier
2016	Ryan Roth	Alexander Cataford	Svein Tuft
2017	Svein Tuft	Nigel Ellsay	Rob Britton
2018	Svein Tuft	Rob Britton	Alexander Cataford
2019	Rob Britton	Svein Tuft	Adam Roberge
2020	Not held due to the COVID-19 pandemic in Canada		
2021	Hugo Houle	Alec Cowan	Derek Gee
2022	Derek Gee	Matteo Dal-Cin	Pier-André Côté
2023	Derek Gee	Nickolas Zukowsky	Matteo Dal-Cin
2024	Pier-André Côté	Carson Miles	Edward Ouellet
2025	Michael Leonard	Derek Gee	Pier-André Côté
2026	Derek Gee-West	Nickolas Zukowsky	Pier-André Côté

=== U23 ===
Year	Gold	Silver	Bronze
1997	Guillaume Belzile	Mark Walters	Andrew Randell
1998	Pascal Chouqette	Matthew Hansen	Alexandre Bernard
1999	Charles Dionne	Jonathan Tremblay	Martin St-Laurent
2000	Pascal Choquette	Charles Dionne	Nat Faulkner
2001	Charles Dionne	Francois Parisien	Martin Gilbert
2002	Ryder Hesjedal		
2003	Dominique Rollin	Chris Isaac	Martin Gilbert
2004	Dominique Rollin	Zachary Bell	Jeff Sherstobitoff
2005	Christian Meier	Ryan Roth	Bradley Fairall
2006	David Veilleux	Christian Meier	Ryan Morris
2007	David Veilleux	Christian Meier	Bradley Fairall
2008	David Veilleux	Bryson Bowers	Garrett McLeod
2009	David Veilleux	Ryan Anderson	Cody Campbell
2010	Hugo Houle	Guillaume Boivin	Jordan Cheyne
2011	Hugo Houle	Rémi Pelletier-Roy	Matteo Dal-Cin
2012	Hugo Houle	David Boily	Rémi Pelletier-Roy
2013	Alexander Cataford	Antoine Duchesne	Matteo Dal-Cin
2014	Kris Dahl	Nigel Ellsay	Peter Disera
2015	Alexander Cataford	Adam de Vos	Emile Jean
2016	Alec Cowan	Jack Burke	Adam Roberge
2017	Adam Roberge	Nickolas Zukowsky	Alec Cowan
2018	Adam Roberge	Nickolas Zukowsky	Adam Jamieson
2019	Adam Roberge	Derek Gee	Nickolas Zukowsky
2020	Not held due to the COVID-19 pandemic in Canada		
2021	Tristan Jussaume	Ethan Sittlington	Carson Miles
2022	Tristan Jussaume	Francis Juneau	Thomas Nadeau
2023	Michael Leonard	Tristan Jussaume	Jonas Walton
2024	Jonas Walton	Michael Leonard	Campbell Parrish
2025	Carson Mattern	Jonas Walton	Campbell Parrish

== Women ==
=== Elite ===
Year	Gold	Silver	Bronze
1995	Clara Hughes	Sue Palmer-Komar	Jennifer Morwen-Smith
1996	Linda Jackson	Anne Samplonius	Jennifer Morwen-Smith
1997	Linda Jackson	Annie Gariepy	Lyne Bessette
1998	Linda Jackson	Anne Samplonius	Andrea Hannos
1999	Clara Hughes	Anne Samplonius	Lyne Bessette
2000	Clara Hughes	Geneviève Jeanson	Leah Goldstein
2001	Lyne Bessette	Geneviève Jeanson	Leah Goldstein
2002	Geneviève Jeanson	Leah Goldstein	Lyne Bessette
2003	Lyne Bessette	Geneviève Jeanson	Manon Jutras
2004	Sue Palmer-Komar	Lyne Bessette	Merrill Collins
2005	Sue Palmer-Komar	Geneviève Jeanson	Felicia Gómez
2006	Alex Wrubleski	Anne Samplonius	Jessica Spence
2007	Anne Samplonius	Lyne Bessette	Leigh Hobson
2008	Anne Samplonius	Julie Beveridge	Alex Wrubleski
2009	Tara Whitten	Anne Samplonius	Laura Brown
2010	Julie Beveridge	Anne Samplonius	Tara Whitten
2011	Clara Hughes	Tara Whitten	Rhae-Christie Shaw
2012	Clara Hughes	Rhae-Christie Shaw	Julie Beveridge
2013	Joëlle Numainville	Anika Todd	Jasmin Glaesser
2014	Leah Kirchmann	Jasmin Glaesser	Anika Todd
2015	Karol-Ann Canuel	Jasmin Glaesser	Leah Kirchmann
2016	Tara Whitten	Karol-Ann Canuel	Joëlle Numainville
2017	Karol-Ann Canuel	Leah Kirchmann	Sara Poidevin
2018	Leah Kirchmann	Karol-Ann Canuel	Kirsti Lay-Giroux
2019	Leah Kirchmann	Karol-Ann Canuel	Marie-Soleil Blais
2020	Not held due to the COVID-19 pandemic in Canada		
2021	Alison Jackson	Marie-Soleil Blais	Gillian Ellsay
2022	Paula Findlay	Marie-Soleil Blais	Leah Kirchmann
2023	Paula Findlay	Olivia Baril	Jenna Nestman
2024	Paula Findlay	Olivia Baril	Sarah Van Dam
2025	Olivia Baril	Julie Lacourciere	Nadia Gontova
