= Christian Meier (cyclist) =

Road bicycle racer

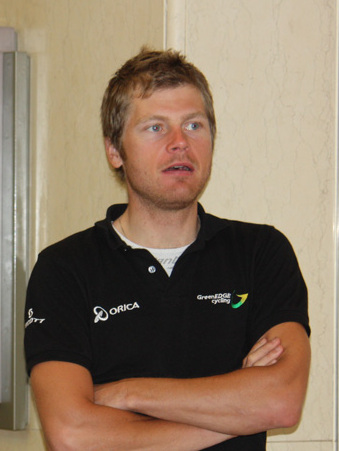
- Meier at the 2012 Japan Cup

Personal information
- Full name: Christian Meier
- Born: February 21, 1985 (age 41) Sussex, New Brunswick, Canada
- Height: 1.72 m (5 ft 7 1/2 in)
- Weight: 61 kg (134 lb)

Cycling career
- Sport: Cycling
- Discipline: Road
- Role: Rider
- Rider type: All-rounder

Amateur team
- 2018: The Service Course

Professional teams
- 2005–2008: Symmetrics
- 2008–2010: Garmin–Chipotle p/b H30
- 2011: UnitedHealthcare
- 2012–2016: GreenEDGE

Major wins
- One-day races and Classics National Road Race Championships (2008)

Christian Meier (born February 21, 1985) is a Canadian former racing cyclist who rode professionally between 2005 and 2016 for the Symmetrics, Garmin–Chipotle p/b H30 and UnitedHealthcare and GreenEDGE teams.

Born in Sussex, New Brunswick, Meier is descended from German restaurateurs who settled outside Sussex, Canada and he attended Sussex Regional High School. His brother Michael succumbed to cancer in 2010. He raced for GreenEDGE in 2012, competing in the Giro d'Italia in May, with his best showing on Day 11 in 15th place. He rode all three Grand Tours in his career, making a total of five Grand Tour starts, his last being the 2014 Tour de France. He announced his retirement from competition in September 2016, despite having a year to run on his contract with the Orica team. After retiring, he contested the 2018 Canadian National Time Trial Championships, finishing 27th.

== Personal life ==
In March 2015 Meier together with his wife Amber opened La Fabrica Girona, a coffee shop in their European home of Girona, Spain. The following year they opened a second coffee shop, Espresso Mafia, nearby.

== Major results ==
2006
4th Overall Vuelta a Chihuahua
2007
1st Road race, National Under-23 Road Championships
2nd Overall Vuelta a Chihuahua

1st Young rider classification

2nd Overall Vuelta a El Salvador

1st Young rider classification

7th Liège–Bastogne–Liège U23
2008
1st Road race, National Road Championships
2009
2nd Time trial, National Road Championships
2010
1st Sprints classification, Tour of the Basque Country
7th Overall Tour of Britain
10th Giro del Veneto
2011
2nd Time trial, National Road Championships
8th Overall Vuelta a Asturias
2012
2nd Time trial, National Road Championships
3rd Overall Tour de Beauce
5th Japan Cup
2013
1st Sprints classification, Volta a Catalunya
2nd Time trial, National Road Championships
3rd Overall Tour de Beauce
2014
1st Mountains classification, Bayern–Rundfahrt
3rd Road race, National Road Championships
2015
3rd Time trial, National Road Championships
