= Mattia Cattaneo =

Italian racing cyclist

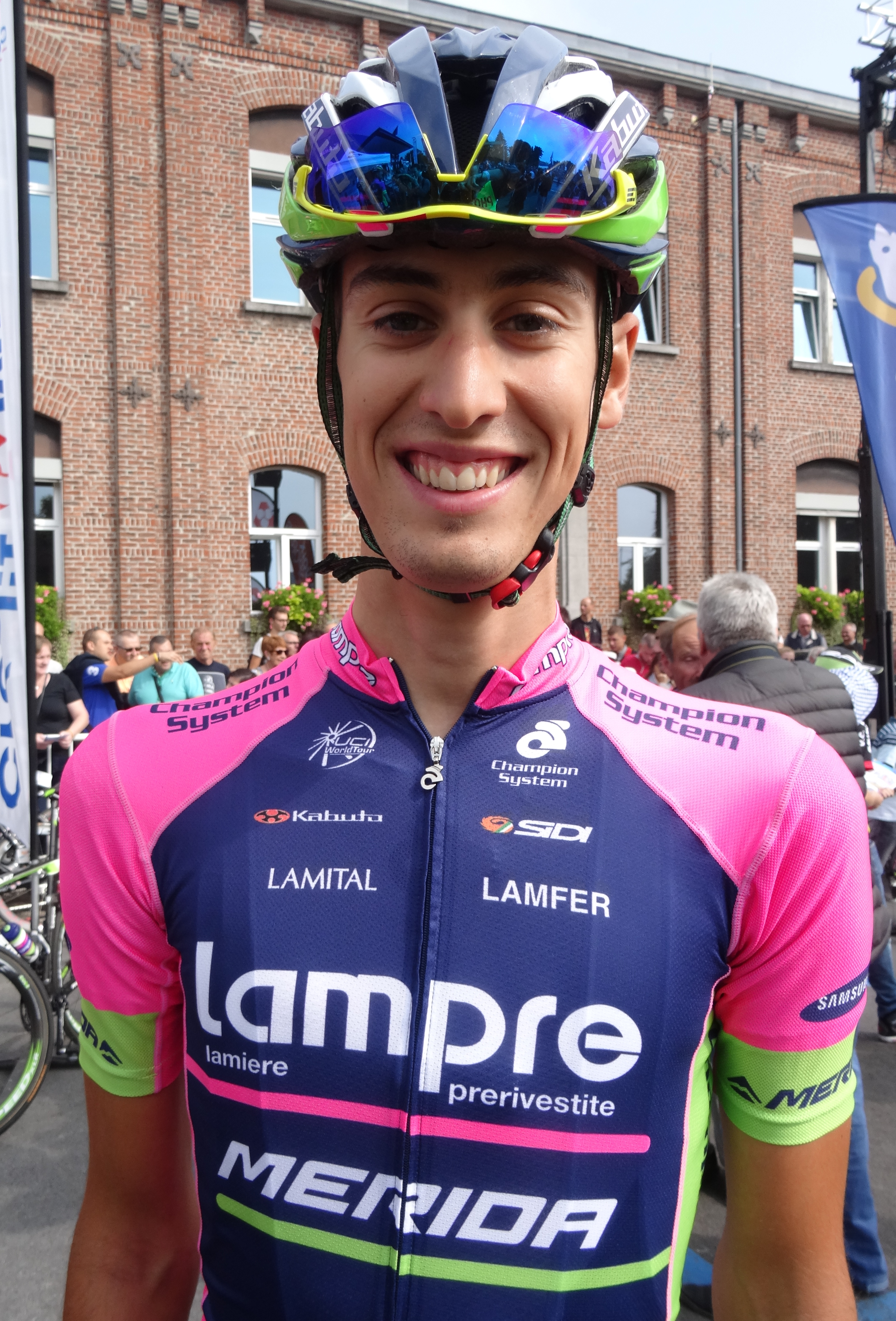
- Cattaneo in 2014

Personal information
- Full name: Mattia Cattaneo
- Born: 25 October 1990 (age 35) Alzano Lombardo, Italy
- Height: 1.82 m (6 ft 0 in)
- Weight: 68 kg (150 lb)

Cycling career
- Sport: Cycling
- Current team: Red Bull–Bora–Hansgrohe
- Discipline: Road
- Role: Rider
- Rider type: All Rounder

Amateur teams
- 2007–2008: For 3–Milram
- 2009: Bottoli Nordelettrica Ramonda
- 2010–2012: U.C. Trevigiani–Dynamon–Bottoli

Professional teams
- 2012: → Lampre–ISD (stagiaire)
- 2013–2016: Lampre–Merida
- 2017–2019: Androni Giocattoli–Sidermec
- 2020–2025: Deceuninck–Quick-Step
- 2026–: Red Bull–Bora–Hansgrohe
Medal record
Men's road bicycle racing
Representing Italy
World Championships
Bronze medal – third place	2024 Zurich	Mixed team relay
European Championships
Gold medal – first place	2024 Limburg	Mixed team relay
Silver medal – second place	2023 Drenthe	Mixed team relay
Bronze medal – third place	2024 Limburg	Time trial

Mattia Cattaneo (born 25 October 1990) is an Italian professional road bicycle racer, who currently rides for UCI WorldTeam Red Bull–Bora–Hansgrohe. As an amateur, Cattaneo won the Girobio in 2011 for the U.C. Trevigiani–Dynamon–Bottoli team. Professional since 2013, he took his first pro win on stage 3 of the 2017 Tour La Provence. In 2019, he won the Giro dell'Appennino one-day race. A strong time trialist, he won the stage four time trial of the 2021 Tour de Luxembourg and the six time trial of the 2023 Tour de Pologne.

== Major results ==
2009
1st GP di Poggiana
2010
9th Coppa della Pace
2011
1st Overall Girobio
1st Gran Premio Capodarco
1st GP di Poggiana
Giro Ciclistico Pesche Nettarine di Romagna

1st Prologue & Stage 3

3rd Overall Tour de l'Avenir
5th Overall Giro della Valle d'Aosta
2012
1st Ruota d'Oro
2nd Trofeo Franco Balestra
3rd Overall Tour de l'Avenir
10th Trofeo PIVA
2017 (1 pro win)
2nd Overall Tour La Provence

1st Stage 3

2nd Classic Sud-Ardèche
4th Overall Tour de l'Ain
5th Time trial, National Road Championships
6th Giro dell'Appennino
7th Overall Tour of Slovenia
9th Trofeo Laigueglia
2018
4th Milano–Torino
5th Time trial, National Road Championships
6th Giro della Toscana
2019 (1)
1st Giro dell'Appennino
2nd GP Industria & Artigianato di Larciano
4th Overall Tour of the Alps
2021 (1)
3rd Time trial, National Road Championships
3rd Overall Tour de Luxembourg

1st Stage 4 (ITT)

8th Overall UAE Tour
9th Overall Tour de Suisse
2022
2nd Time trial, National Road Championships
Combativity award Stage 8 Tour de France
2023 (1)
UEC European Road Championships

2nd Team relay
5th Time trial

2nd Time trial, National Road Championships
5th Overall Tour de Pologne

1st Stage 6 (ITT)

8th Time trial, UCI Road World Championships
2024
UEC European Championships

1st Team relay
3rd Time trial

3rd Team relay, UCI Road World Championships
2025
3rd Time trial, National Road Championships
10th Overall Tirreno–Adriatico
2026
1st Team relay, UCI Road World Championships
1st (TTT) Trofeo Ses Salines

=== Grand Tour general classification results timeline ===
Grand Tour	2013	2014	2015	2016	2017	2018	2019	2020	2021	2022	2023	2024	2025
Giro d'Italia	DNF	64	—	—	—	33	28	—	—	—	DNF	—	44
Tour de France	—	—	—	—	—	—	—	—	12	96	—	—	DNF
Vuelta a España	—	—	DNF	102	—	—	—	17	—	—	34	23	

Legend
—	Did not compete
DNF	Did not finish
