= 2012 Tro-Bro Léon =

Race details
- Dates: 15 April 2012
- Stages: 1
- Distance: 206.4 km (128.3 mi)
- Winning time: 5h 16' 40"

Results
	Winner	Ryan Roth (CAN)
	Second	Benoît Jarrier (FRA)
	Third	Guillaume Boivin (CAN)

The 2012 Tro-Bro Léon was the 29th edition of the Tro-Bro Léon cycle race and was held on 15 April 2012. The race was won by Ryan Roth.

== General classification ==
Final general classification

Rank	Rider	Time
1	Ryan Roth (CAN)	5h 16' 40"
2	Benoît Jarrier (FRA)	+ 13"
3	Guillaume Boivin (CAN)	+ 37"
4	Arnaud Démare (FRA)	+ 37"
5	Kristof Goddaert (BEL)	+ 37"
6	Lloyd Mondory (FRA)	+ 37"
7	Aleksejs Saramotins (LAT)	+ 37"
8	Jérémie Galland (FRA)	+ 37"
9	Romain Feillu (FRA)	+ 37"
10	Tony Hurel (FRA)	+ 37"
