= Steve Fisher (cyclist) =

American cyclist (born 1990)

Personal information
- Full name: Steve Fisher
- Born: June 22, 1990 (age 36) Seattle

Cycling career
- Sport: Cycling
- Discipline: Road
- Role: Rider

Amateur teams
- 2008–2013: Hagens–Berman LLP Cycling
- 2016: Canyon Bicycles–Shimano
- 2019: Hangar 15 Bicycles

Professional teams
- 2014–2015: Jelly Belly–Maxxis
- 2017: Canyon Bicycles
- 2018: Jelly Belly–Maxxis

Steve Fisher (born June 22, 1990) is an American cyclist, who last rode for American amateur team Hangar 15 Bicycles. Fisher's greatest results in his road career were in Canadian races. To help fund his racing Fisher worked as a cycling coach.

== Career ==
In 2012 he rode the White Spot Road Race and took the win. This race was a part of an Omnium type event made of the three races that were held that weekend. With a second and a fifth in the other two events Fisher won overall. In the 2013, now a UCI race, he rode again the White Spot Road Race winning from a reduced-sprint finish. At the Bucks County Classic Fisher was in a sixteen-man break that had attacked over the hilly course. With a hilly finish the break slowly whittled away with four men together in the final kilometres with Fisher ultimately losing 13 seconds on the finish line to the winner. Following his good 2013 season he signed for Jelly Belly–Maxxis for the 2014 season. In 2016, now with amateur team Canyon Bicycles–Shimano, Fisher once again rode the Delta Road Race. This time finishing third in a two-man sprint for second, he finished 10 seconds behind the winner.

His team became a UCI Continental Team for the 2017 season allowing Fisher greater access to more races. One such race was the Grand Prix Cycliste de Saguenay, a four-stage race held in Canada. Stage 1 was a 166 km stage around a 15 km circuit, with Fisher getting into the breakaway of the day which escaped after riding 80 km. Fisher won the seven-man sprint taking the lead of the tour by seven seconds. Stage 2 ended in a group sprint with Fisher taking seventh, Guillaume Boivin who was second overall took 4 bonus seconds this stage reducing Fisher's lead to three seconds. In stage 3 the breakaway won with Fisher safely in the peloton 11 seconds behind but Boivin had cut his lead to 2 seconds after an intermediate sprint. Stage 4 was the final stage of the Tour with a strong 10-man breakaway getting a gap of four minutes Fisher sent his Canyon Bicycles teammates to chase the break and not lose his slim lead. They limited the gap so that by the final kilometres Fisher was less than a minute behind. He launched an attack to try gain time taking two more seconds on Boivin at the finish. Coming home in seventh position gave Fisher enough points to win the Points jersey by 1 point over Boivin. This was his only stage-race victory in his career.

== Major results ==
2012
1st White Spot Road Race
2013
1st White Spot Road Race
4th Bucks County Classic
2016
3rd Delta Road Race
2017
1st Overall Grand Prix Cycliste de Saguenay

1st Points classification
1st Stage 1
