= Tour of Alberta =

Canadian multi-day road cycling race

Race details
- Date: September
- Region: Alberta, Canada
- Local name: The Tour
- Nickname: Canada's Race
- Discipline: Road
- Competition: UCI America Tour
- Type: Stage race
- Organiser: Alberta Peloton Association
- Race director: Duane Vienneau
- Web site: tourofalberta.ca

History
- First edition: 2013
- Editions: 5 (as of 2017)
- First winner: Rohan Dennis (AUS)
- Most wins: No repeat winners
- Most recent: Evan Huffman (USA)

The ATB Tour of Alberta was a Canadian bicycle stage race, which raced across the province of Alberta. It was sanctioned by Union Cycliste Internationale (UCI) and was part of the UCI America Tour. It was classified as a 2.1 race, making it one of the highest rated races on the tour. The inaugural tour featured a prologue and five stages, and was held September 3–8, 2013.

On February 15, 2018, the Alberta Peloton Association announced that the event was being cancelled.

== History ==
The Tour of Alberta was the brainchild of former professional cyclist Alex Steida, who was the first North American cyclist to wear the Yellow Jersey in the Tour de France. After moving to Edmonton, Steida felt that the local geography and the ability of residents to "roll up their sleeves and get stuff done" made the province an ideal place for a multi-stage race and he spent nearly a decade promoting the idea. The idea began to take shape in 2012 when proponents secured support from the Rural Alberta Development Fund, which believed such a race could promote the province to a world audience. The proposed race was sanctioned by UCI in late 2012 and given a 2.1 classification, making it one of the highest rated events on the UCI America Tour.

== Classifications ==
The race had six individual classifications, and the leader in each wore a special jersey in similar fashion to the Tour de France:

- Yellow jersey: General classification (overall leader)
- Green jersey: Sprint classification
- Polka dot jersey: Mountains classification
- White jersey: Young rider classification
- Red jersey: Canadian rider classification
- Blue jersey: Most aggressive rider

== Results ==
=== General classification ===
Year	1st place	Team	2nd place	Team	3rd place	Team
2013	Rohan Dennis (AUS)	Garmin–Sharp	Brent Bookwalter (USA)	BMC Racing Team	Damiano Caruso (ITA)	Cannondale
2014	Daryl Impey (RSA)	Orica–GreenEDGE	Tom Dumoulin (NED)	Giant–Shimano	Ruben Zepuntke (GER)	Bissell Development Team
2015	Bauke Mollema (NED)	Trek Factory Racing	Adam Yates (GBR)	Orica–GreenEDGE	Tom-Jelte Slagter (NED)	Cannondale–Garmin
2016	Robin Carpenter (USA)	Holowesko Citadel Racing Team	Bauke Mollema (NED)	Trek–Segafredo	Evan Huffman (USA)	Rally Cycling
2017	Evan Huffman (USA)	Rally Cycling	Sepp Kuss (USA)	Rally Cycling	Alex Howes (USA)	Cannondale–Drapac

=== Other classifications ===
Year	Sprints	Mountains	Young rider	Canadian rider	Teams
2013	Peter Sagan (SVK)	Tom-Jelte Slagter (NED)	Rohan Dennis (AUS)	Ryan Anderson (CAN)	BMC Racing Team
2014	Ramūnas Navardauskas (LTU)	Simon Yates (GBR)	Tom Dumoulin (NED)	Ryan Anderson (CAN)	Garmin–Sharp
2015	Michael Matthews (AUS)	Ben Perry (CAN)	Adam Yates (GBR)	Michael Woods (CAN)	Cannondale–Garmin
2016	Colin Joyce (USA)	Danilo Celano (ITA)	Colin Joyce (USA)	Alexander Cataford (CAN)	Silber Pro Cycling Team
2017	Wouter Wippert (NED)	Alec Cowan (CAN)	Jack Burke (CAN)	Jack Burke (CAN)	Rally Cycling
