= Kris Dahl =

Canadian cyclist

Personal information
- Full name: Kristofer Dahl
- Born: July 7, 1992 (age 34) Calgary, Alberta, Canada

Cycling career
- Sport: Cycling
- Discipline: Road
- Role: Rider

Amateur teams
- 2012–2013: H&R Block
- 2013: Team Smartstop–Mountain Khakis (stagiaire)

Professional teams
- 2014–2015: Team SmartStop
- 2016–2017: Silber Pro Cycling Team

Kristofer Dahl (born July 7, 1992) is a Canadian cyclist. He rode the 2014 and 2015 seasons with Team SmartStop, a professional cycling team based out of Winston-Salem, North Carolina. He rode for the Silber Pro Cycling Team in 2016 and 2017. Dahl has competed internationally, representing Canada on numerous occasions. He currently resides in Calgary, Alberta.

== Major results ==
2014
1st National Under-23 Time Trial Championships
2nd National Under-23 Road Race Championships
2016
1st Stage 1 Tour of Utah
