= Michael Leonard (cyclist) =

Canadian cyclist

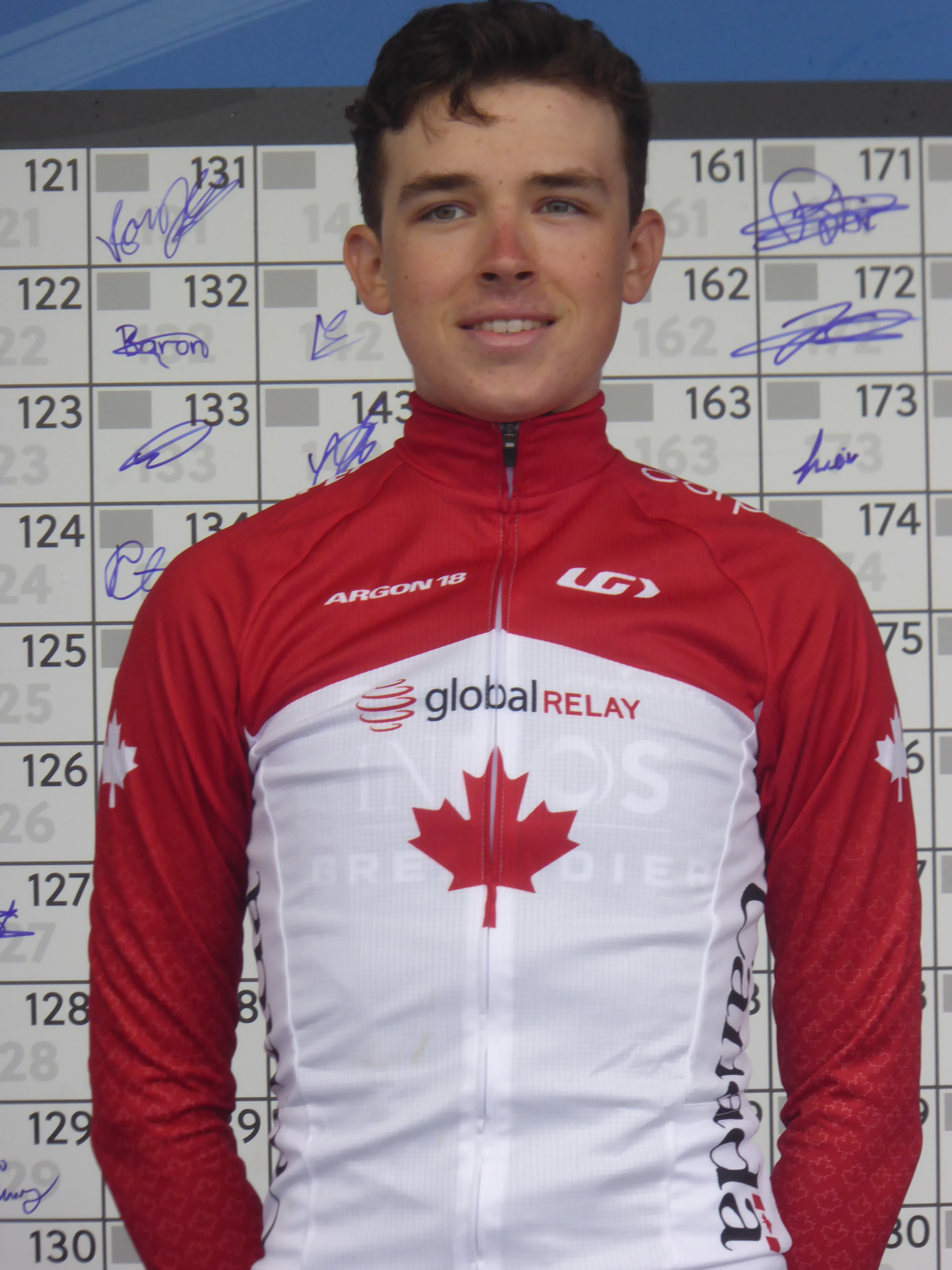
- Leonard in 2023

Personal information
- Born: 26 March 2004 (age 22) Oakville, Canada

Cycling career
- Sport: Cycling
- Current team: Netcompany–Ineos
- Discipline: Road
- Role: Rider

Amateur teams
- 2021: Toronto Hustle U19
- 2022: Team Franco Ballerini Juniors

Professional team
- 2023–: INEOS Grenadiers

Major wins
- One-day races and Classics National Time Trial Championships (2025)

Michael Leonard (born 26 March 2004) is a Canadian racing cyclist, who currently rides for UCI WorldTeam Netcompany–Ineos.

== Career ==
In 2021 while racing for Toronto Hustle Team Development he came second overall at the Tour du Léman Juniors. Leonard moved to Team Franco Ballerini Juniors at the start of the 2022 season. In August he once again rode the Tour du Léman Juniors this time winning the overall. On 22 September 2022 it was announced that Leonard would join INEOS Grenadiers on a three-year contract from 2023.

== Major results ==
2021
1st Trofee Maarten Wynants Juniors
2nd Overall Tour du Léman Juniors
2nd Langemark Madonna
2nd GP Metaalwaren Rosseel
2nd Sint-Lambrechts-Herk
8th Mol Ezaart
10th Balegem
2022
1st Overall Tour du Léman Juniors

1st Stage 2

1st Ballero Nel Cuore
1st Trofeo Sopegu
1st Gran Premio Boncellino Cronometro
1st Gran Premio Bermac Gara
1st Memorial Paolo Batignani
1st Trofeo Madonna del Cavatore
2nd Trofeo Vivaldo Cipollini
3rd Coppa Giulio Burci Juniors
4th Giro di Primavera
5th Trofeo Biondi Alessandro Alla Memoria
5th Coppa Pietro Linari
6th GP Neri Sottoli.it
8th Giro della Castellania
10th Overall Trofeo Buffoni Juniors
10th Trofeo Conad Monsummano Terme
2023
1st Time trial, National Under-23 Road Championships
10th Time trial, UCI Road World Under-23 Championships
2024
1st Stage 1 (ITT) Tour de l'Avenir
2nd Time trial, National Under-23 Road Championships
2025 (1 pro win)
National Road Championships

1st Time trial
3rd Road race
