= White Spot / Delta Road Race (men's race) =

Race details
- Date: July
- Region: Delta, British Columbia
- Discipline: Road race
- Competition: UCI America Tour
- Type: Single day race
- Web site: tourdedelta.ca

History
- First edition: 2001
- Editions: 19
- Most recent: Sam Bassetti (USA)

The White Spot / Delta Road Race was a professional one day cycling race formerly held annually in Canada until its closing after 2019. It was part of the UCI America Tour in category 1.2.

== Winners ==
Year	Country	Rider	Team
2012	United States	Steve Fisher	Hagens Berman Cycling
2013	United States	Steve Fisher	Hagens Berman Cycling
2014	United States	Jesse Anthony	Optum–Kelly Benefit Strategies
2015	United States	Eric Young	Optum–Kelly Benefit Strategies
2016	Canada	Ryan Roth	Silber Pro Cycling Team
2017	United States	John Murphy	Holowesko Citadel Racing Team
2018	Canada	Adam de Vos	Rally Cycling
2019	United States	Sam Bassetti	Elevate–KHS Pro Cycling
