= Hangar 15 Bicycles =

Team information
- UCI code: CYN
- Registered: United States
- Founded: 1994
- Discipline: Road
- Status: UCI Continental
- Bicycles: Scott

Team name history
- 1994–2013 2014–2016 2017 2017–: Canyon Bicycles; Canyon Bicycles–Shimano; Canyon Bicycles; Hangar 15 Bicycles

Hangar 15 Bicycles is an American UCI Continental cycling team founded in 1994. It gained UCI Continental status in 2017.

== Team roster ==
Rider	Date of birth
Chad Beyer (USA)	15 August 1986 (age 40)
Cortlan Brown (USA)	31 May 1989 (age 37)
Michael Burleigh (USA)	24 January 1982 (age 44)
Steve Fisher (USA)	22 June 1990 (age 36)
Cory Greenberg (USA)	23 January 1988 (age 38)

Rider	Date of birth
Kaler Marshall (USA)	24 June 1986 (age 40)
Francisco Mancebo (ESP)	9 March 1976 (age 50)
Eric Slack (USA)	9 February 1988 (age 38)
Rob Squire (USA)	1 April 1990 (age 36)
Chris Winn (AUS)	12 March 1984 (age 42)

== Major wins ==
2017
Stage 1 Grand Prix Cycliste de Saguenay, Steve Fisher
