= Brian Walton (cyclist) =

Canadian cyclist (born 1965)

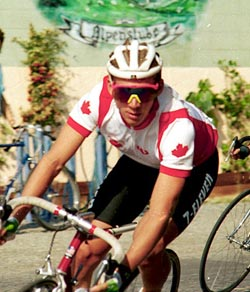
- Walton riding in the Canadian road champion jersey for 7-Eleven in the 1988 Tour de White Rock

Personal information
- Born: December 18, 1965 (age 60) Ottawa, Ontario, Canada

Cycling career
- Sport: Cycling
- Current team: Retired
- Disciplines: Road; Track
- Role: Rider

Professional teams
- 1989–1992: 7-Eleven
- 1993–2000: Saturn

Managerial team
- 2000–2003: Team Snow Valley
Medal record
Representing Canada
Men's track cycling
Olympic Games
Silver medal – second place	1996 Atlanta	Points race
Pan American Games
Gold medal – first place	1995 Mar del Plata	Points race
Bronze medal – third place	1995 Mar del Plata	Individual pursuit
Commonwealth Games
Bronze medal – third place	1994 Victoria, BC	Scratch
Men's road cycling
Pan American Games
Gold medal – first place	1999 Winnipeg	Road race
Gold medal – first place	1995 Mar del Plata	Road race

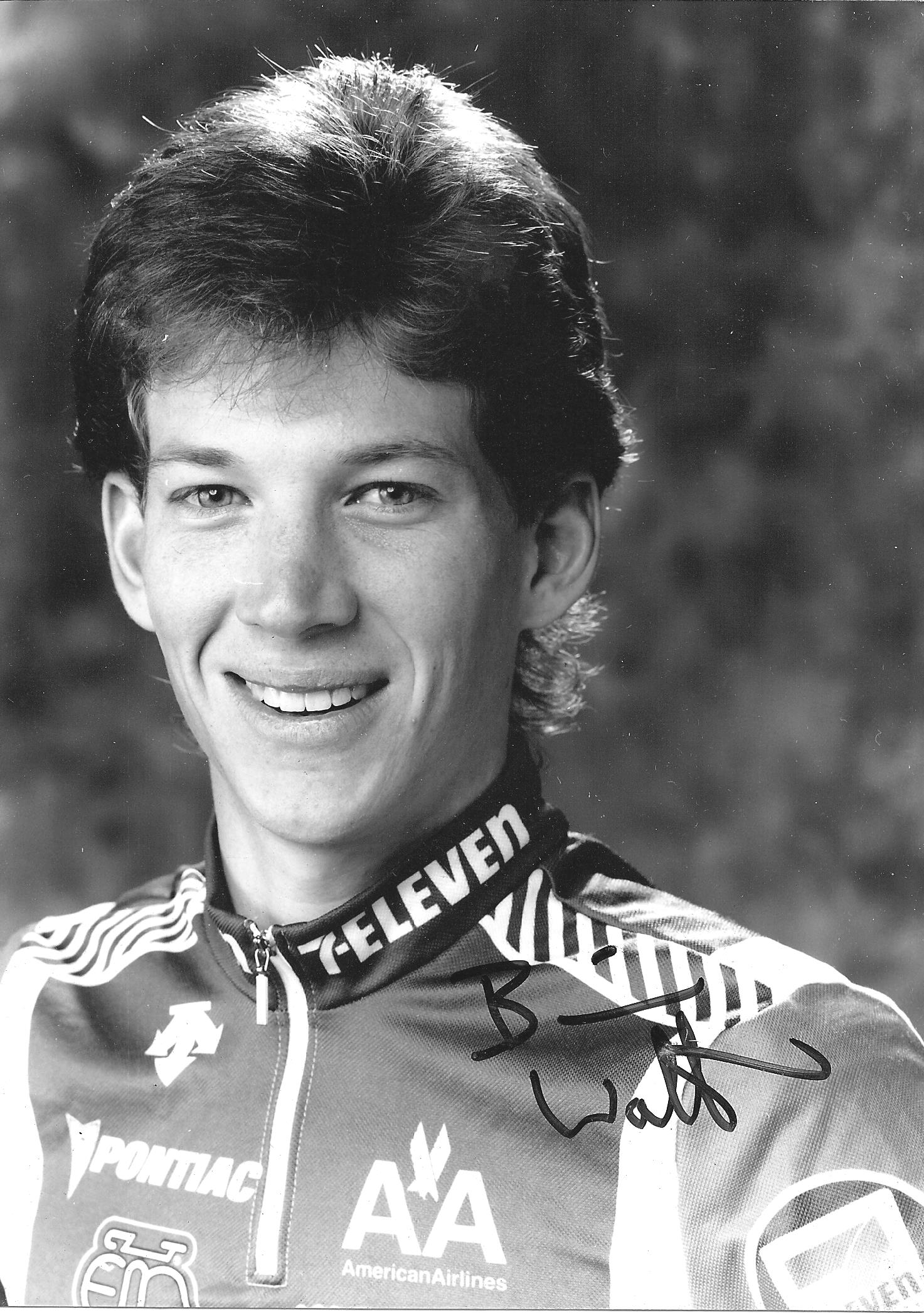
Walton's official 7-11 team press photo from 1989

Brian Clifford Walton (born December 18, 1965) is a Canadian cycling coach and former professional road and track cyclist. His racing career spanned 18 years, racing professionally for North American pro teams 7-Eleven, Motorola, and Saturn. He represented Canada at the Pan American Games, Commonwealth Games, and the Olympic Games in 1988, 1996 and 2000. He won a silver medal in the points race at the 1996 Summer Olympics in Atlanta, Georgia. Walton was inducted into the BC Sports Hall of Fame in 2006.

Walton is a former partner at Cadence Performance Cycling Center in Philadelphia. He now is the president of Walton Endurance.

== Major results ==
=== Road ===
1988
1st Road race, National Road Championships
1st Gastown Grand Prix
1989
1st Overall Milk Race

1st Stage 9b

6th Overall Tour of Ireland
1990
1st Stage 5b (ITT) Tour of the Basque Country
1st Stage 4 International Cycling Classic
2nd Cholet-Pays de Loire
3rd GP Eddy Merckx
8th Overall Tour Méditerranéen
1991
1st Overall Bayern Rundfahrt

1st Prologue, Stages 2b & 4

1st Stage 4 International Cycling Classic
1992
7th GP Eddy Merckx
1993
2nd Overall Herald Sun Tour

1st Stage 13

1994
1st Tour de White Rock
3rd Overall Cascade Classic
3rd Philadelphia International Championship
1995
1st Road race, Pan American Games
1st Tour de White Rock
3rd Overall Valley of the Sun Stage Race

1st Stage 2

3rd Overall West Virginia Classic
4th Philadelphia International Championship
1996
5th Overall Herald Sun Tour
6th Overall Tour of China
1997
1st Stage 8 Tour de Langkawi
2nd Time trial, National Road Championships
2nd Overall Fitchburg Longsjo Classic
6th Overall Circuit des Mines

1st Stage 2

9th Overall Peace Race
1998
1st Fyen Rundt
National Road Championships

2nd Road race
2nd Time trial

3rd Overall Fitchburg Longsjo Classic

1st Prologue

6th Road race, Commonwealth Games
9th Overall Tour of Japan
1999
1st Road race, Pan American Games
Tour of Japan

1st Points classification
1st Stage 6

2nd Time trial, National Road Championships
2nd Philadelphia International Championship
7th Overall Tour de Beauce
2000
3rd Road race, National Road Championships
5th First Union Wilmington Classic
6th Overall Tour de Slovénie

=== Track ===
1983
1st Points race, National Championships
1984
1st Points race, National Championships
1994
3rd Scratch, Commonwealth Games
1995
Pan American Games

1st Points race
3rd Individual pursuit

1996
2nd Points race, Summer Olympics
1997
1st Points race, Trexlertown, UCI World Cup
1998
1st Points race, Victoria, UCI World Cup
1999
1st Points race, Manchester, UCI World Cup
