= Human Powered Health (men's team) =

American men's cycling team

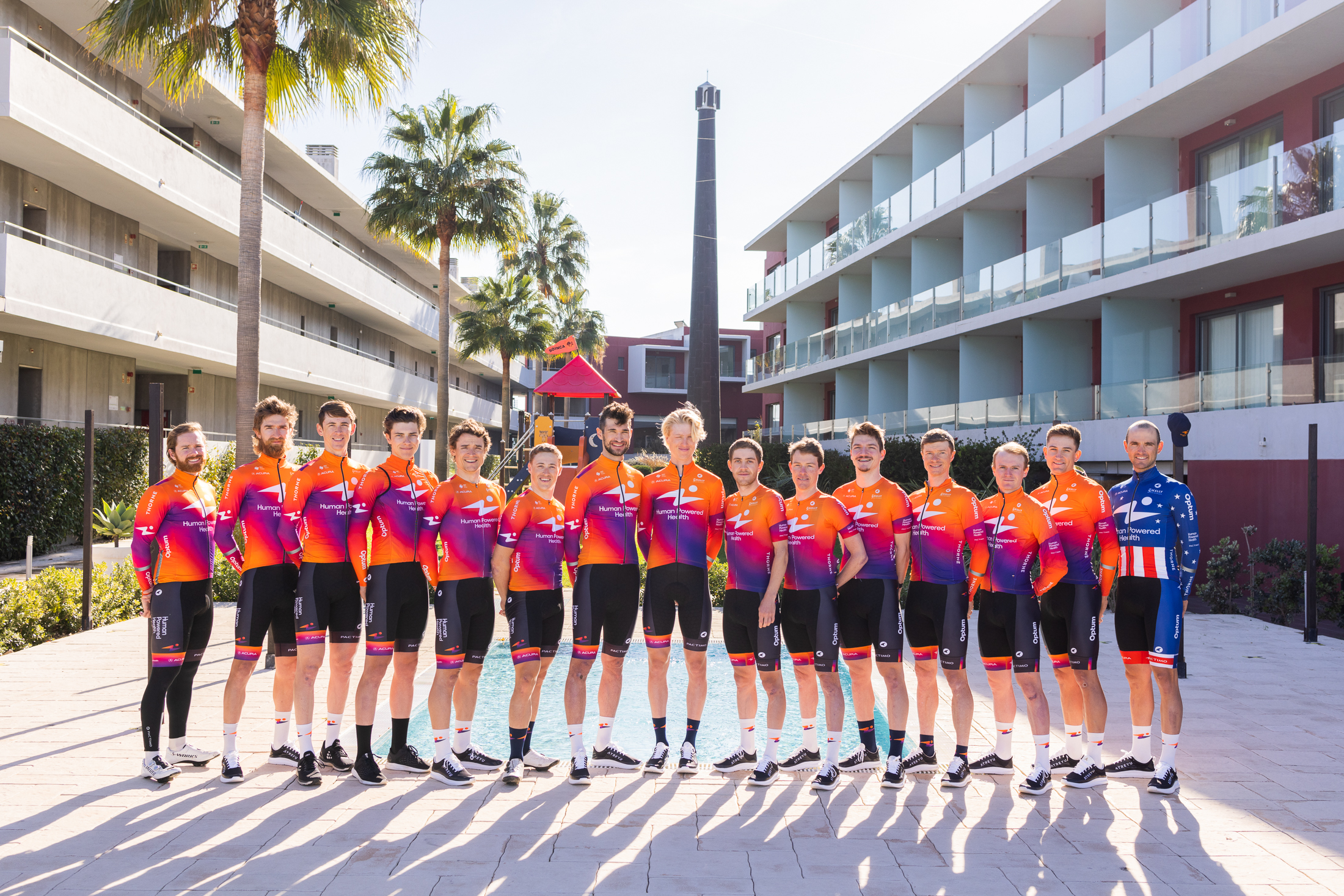
- The men's team of UCI ProTeam Human Powered Health

Team information
- UCI code: HPM
- Registered: Minneapolis, Minnesota, U.S.
- Founded: 2007
- Disbanded: 2023
- Discipline: Road
- Status: UCI Continental (2007–2017); UCI Professional Continental (2018–2019); UCI ProTeam (2020–2023)
- Bicycles: LeMond Racing Cycles (2007–2008); Fisher (2009); Orbea (2010–2013); Diamondback Bicycles (2014–2018); Felt Bicycles (2019–2023)
- Website: Team home page

Key personnel
- General manager: Jonas Carney
- Team managers: Eric Wohlberg; Pat McCarty; Hendrik Redant

Team name history
- 2007–2009 2010 2011 2012–2015 2016–2018 2019 2020–2021 2022–2023: Kelly Benefit Strategies–Medifast; Kelly Benefit Strategies; Kelly Benefit Strategies–OptumHealth; Optum p/b Kelly Benefit Strategies; Rally Cycling; Rally UHC Cycling; Rally Cycling; Human Powered Health
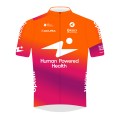
Human Powered Health jersey
Jersey

Human Powered Health (UCI team code: HPM) was a UCI ProTeam cycling team, based in the United States. Notable riders who have previously ridden for the team include Ben King, Chad Haga, Carter Jones, Phil Gaimon, Michael Woods, David Veilleux, Matthew Busche, Ryan Anderson, Mike Creed, Mike Friedman and Sepp Kuss.

== Team roster ==
As of January 23, 2023.

Rider	Date of birth
Kristian Aasvold (NOR)	May 30, 1995 (age 31)
Stanisław Aniołkowski (POL)	January 20, 1997 (age 29)
Alan Banaszek (POL)	October 30, 1997 (age 28)
Stephen Bassett (USA)	March 27, 1995 (age 31)
Charles-Étienne Chrétien (CAN)	June 19, 1999 (age 27)
Pier-André Côté (CAN)	April 24, 1997 (age 29)
Adam de Vos (CAN)	October 21, 1993 (age 32)
Paul Double (GBR)	June 25, 1996 (age 30)
Matthew Gibson (GBR)	September 2, 1996 (age 30)
Cory Greenberg (USA)	January 23, 1988 (age 38)
Chad Haga (USA)	August 26, 1988 (age 38)
Gage Hecht (USA)	February 18, 1998 (age 28)

Rider	Date of birth
August Jensen (NOR)	August 29, 1991 (age 35)
Colin Joyce (USA)	August 6, 1994 (age 32)
Wessel Krul (NED)	January 28, 2000 (age 26)
Bart Lemmen (NED)	October 14, 1995 (age 30)
Scott McGill (USA)	September 20, 1998 (age 27)
Barnabás Peák (HUN)	November 29, 1998 (age 27)
Benjamin Perry (CAN)	March 7, 1994 (age 32)
Sebastian Schönberger (AUT)	May 14, 1994 (age 32)
Embret Svestad-Bårdseng (NOR)	September 1, 2002 (age 24)
Gijs Van Hoecke (BEL)	November 12, 1991 (age 34)
Sasha Weemaes (BEL)	February 9, 1998 (age 28)

== Major wins ==
2009
Overall Vuelta del Uruguay, Scott Zwizanski

Stages 1, 3 & 4, Jake Keough
Stage 2, Jonathan Reid Mumford
Stage 7, Scott Zwizanski

Overall Tour of Thailand, Andrew Bajadali

Stage 5, Andrew Bajadali

Overall Tour de Beauce, Scott Zwizanski
2010
Overall Festningsrittet, Jesse Anthony
2011
Stage 2 Tour of Utah, Jesse Anthony
2012
Stages 1, 5, 6 & 10 Vuelta del Uruguay, Ken Hanson
Tour de Korea

Stage 2, Alex Candelario
Stages 7 & 8, Ken Hanson

Tour of Elk Grove

Prologue, Tom Zirbel
Stages 1 & 2, Ken Hanson

Gooikse Pijl, Ken Hanson
2013
Volta ao Alentejo

Stage 3, Ken Hanson
Stage 4, Tom Zirbel

Stage 3 Tour of the Gila, Tom Zirbel
United States National Time Trial Championships, Tom Zirbel
Stages 2 & 4 Tour de Korea, Eric Young
United States National Criterium Championships, Eric Young
Stage 1 Tour of Elk Grove, Chad Haga
2014
Stage 6 Vuelta Mexico Telmex, Eric Young
Stage 2 Redlands Bicycle Classic, Tom Zirbel
Tour of the Battenkill, Scott Zwizanski
Stage 4 Joe Martin Stage Race, Brad Huff
Overall Tour of the Gila, Carter Jones
Stage 4 Tour of California, Will Routley
Stages 1 & 2 Grand Prix Cycliste de Saguenay, Eric Young
Overall Nature Valley Grand Prix, Ryan Anderson

Stage 1a, Tom Zirbel
Stage 2, Ryan Anderson

Delta International Road Race, Jesse Anthony
Prologue Cascade Cycling Classic, Tom Zirbel
Stage 5 Tour of Utah, Eric Young
2015
Clássica Loulé, Michael Woods
Overall Redlands Bicycle Classic, Phil Gaimon

Stage 2 (ITT), Tom Zirbel
Stage 3, Phil Gaimon

Stage 2 GP Internacional do Guadiana, Ryan Anderson
Tour of the Gila

Stage 2, Eric Young
Stage 3 (ITT), Tom Zirbel
Stage 5, Michael Woods

Stage 3 Grand Prix Cycliste de Saguenay, Pierrick Naud
Stage 3b Tour de Beauce, Guillaume Boivin
Canada National Road Race Championships, Guillaume Boivin
White Spot / Delta Road Race, Eric Young
Tour of Utah

Stage 4, Eric Young
Stage 5, Michael Woods

2016
Prologue Istrian Spring Trophy, Eric Young
Stage 2 GP Liberty Seguros, Will Routley
Stage 3 Tour of the Gila, Tom Zirbel
Stage 4 Grand Prix Cycliste de Saguenay, Eric Young
Stage 2 Tour de Beauce, Sepp Kuss
Gastown Grand Prix, Eric Young
Prologue Tour Alsace, Curtis White
Stage 3 Tour of Alberta, Evan Huffman
2017
Joe Martin Stage Race

Stage 1 (ITT), Adam de Vos
Stage 3, Eric Young

Overall Tour of the Gila, Evan Huffman

Stage 1 Matteo Dal-Cin
Stages 2 & 4 Eric Young
Stage 3 (ITT), Evan Huffman

Stages 4 & 7 Tour of California, Evan Huffman
Tour de Beauce

Stage 2, Matteo Dal-Cin
Stage 5, Rob Britton

Canada National Road Race Championships, Matteo Dal-Cin
United States National U23 Time Trial Championships, Brandon McNulty
Gastown Grand Prix, Eric Young
Cascade Cycling Classic

Stage 2 (ITT), Evan Huffman
Stage 4, Shane Kline

Overall Tour of Utah, Rob Britton

Stage 3 (ITT), Rob Britton

Overall Tour of Alberta, Evan Huffman

Stage 1, Evan Huffman

2018
Stage 3 Tour de Langkawi, Adam de Vos
Overall Tour of the Gila, Rob Britton
White Spot / Delta Road Race, Adam de Vos
Gastown Grand Prix, Eric Young
Stage 2 Arctic Race of Norway, Colin Joyce
2019
Overall Giro di Sicilia, Brandon McNulty

Stage 3, Brandon McNulty

Rutland–Melton CiCLE Classic, Colin Joyce
Stages 2, 3 & 4 Grand Prix Cycliste de Saguenay, Pier-André Côté
Canada National Time Trial Championships, Rob Britton
Canada National Road Race Championships, Adam de Vos
2020
Stages 4 & 5 Tour de Savoie Mont-Blanc, Gavin Mannion
2021
Stage 1 Presidential Tour of Turkey, Arvid de Kleijn
United States National Road Race Championships, Joey Rosskopf
Volta a Portugal

Stages 2 & 8, Kyle Murphy
Stage 6, Ben King

Stage 4 Danmark Rundt, Colin Joyce
Stage 2 Tour of Britain, Robin Carpenter
Route Adélie, Arvid de Kleijn
2022
Grand Prix Criquielion, Pier-André Côté
Stage 1 Four Days of Dunkirk, Arvid de Kleijn
Canada National Road Race Championships, Pier-André Côté
United States National Road Race Championships, Kyle Murphy

== Supplementary statistics ==
Grand Tours by highest finishing position
Race	2018	2019	2020	2021	2022
Giro d'Italia	–	–	–	–	–
Tour de France	–	–	–	–	–
Vuelta a España	–	–	–	–	–
Major week-long stage races by highest finishing position
Race	2018	2019	2020	2021	2022
Tour Down Under	–	–	–	NH	
Paris–Nice	–	–	–	–	–
Tirreno–Adriatico	–	–	–	–	–
Volta a Catalunya	–	–	NH	103	–
Tour of the Basque Country	–	–	NH	–	–
/ Tour de Romandie	–	–	NH	–	–
Critérium du Dauphiné	–	–	–	–	–
Tour de Suisse	–	81	NH	52	32
Tour de Pologne	–	–	–	–	–
BinckBank Tour	–	–	–	–	NH
Monuments by highest finishing position
Monument	2018	2019	2020	2021	2022
Milan–San Remo	–	–	–	–	–
Tour of Flanders	–	–	–	–	–
Paris–Roubaix	–	–	NH	–	–
Liège–Bastogne–Liège	–	–	–	–	–
Il Lombardia	–	–	–	–	–
Classics by highest finishing position
Classic	2018	2019	2020	2021	2022
Omloop Het Nieuwsblad	–	–	–	–	–
Kuurne–Brussels–Kuurne	–	–	–	–	35
Strade Bianche	–	–	–	–	–
E3 Harelbeke	–	–	NH	–	–
Gent–Wevelgem	–	–	–	–	–
Amstel Gold Race	–	–	NH	–	–
La Flèche Wallonne	–	89	–	–	–
Clásica de San Sebastián	–	–	NH	–	–
Paris–Tours	–	42	19	–	–

Legend
—	Did not compete
DNF	Did not finish
DNS	Did not start
NH	Not held

== National and continental champions ==
2013
United States Time trial Champion, Tom Zirbel
United States Criterium Champion, Eric Young
2015
Canadian Road race Champion, Guillaume Boivin
2017
Canadian Road race Champion, Matteo Dal-Cin
United States Under-23 Time trial Champion, Brandon McNulty
2019
Canadian Road race Champion, Adam de Vos
Canadian Time trial Champion, Rob Britton
2021
United States Road race Champion, Joey Rosskopf
2022
Canadian Road race Champion, Pier-André Côté
United States Road race Champion, Kyle Murphy
2023
Pan American Road Race Champion Pier-André Côté
Polish Road race Champion, Alan Banaszek
