= Marie-Soleil Blais =

Canadian cyclist

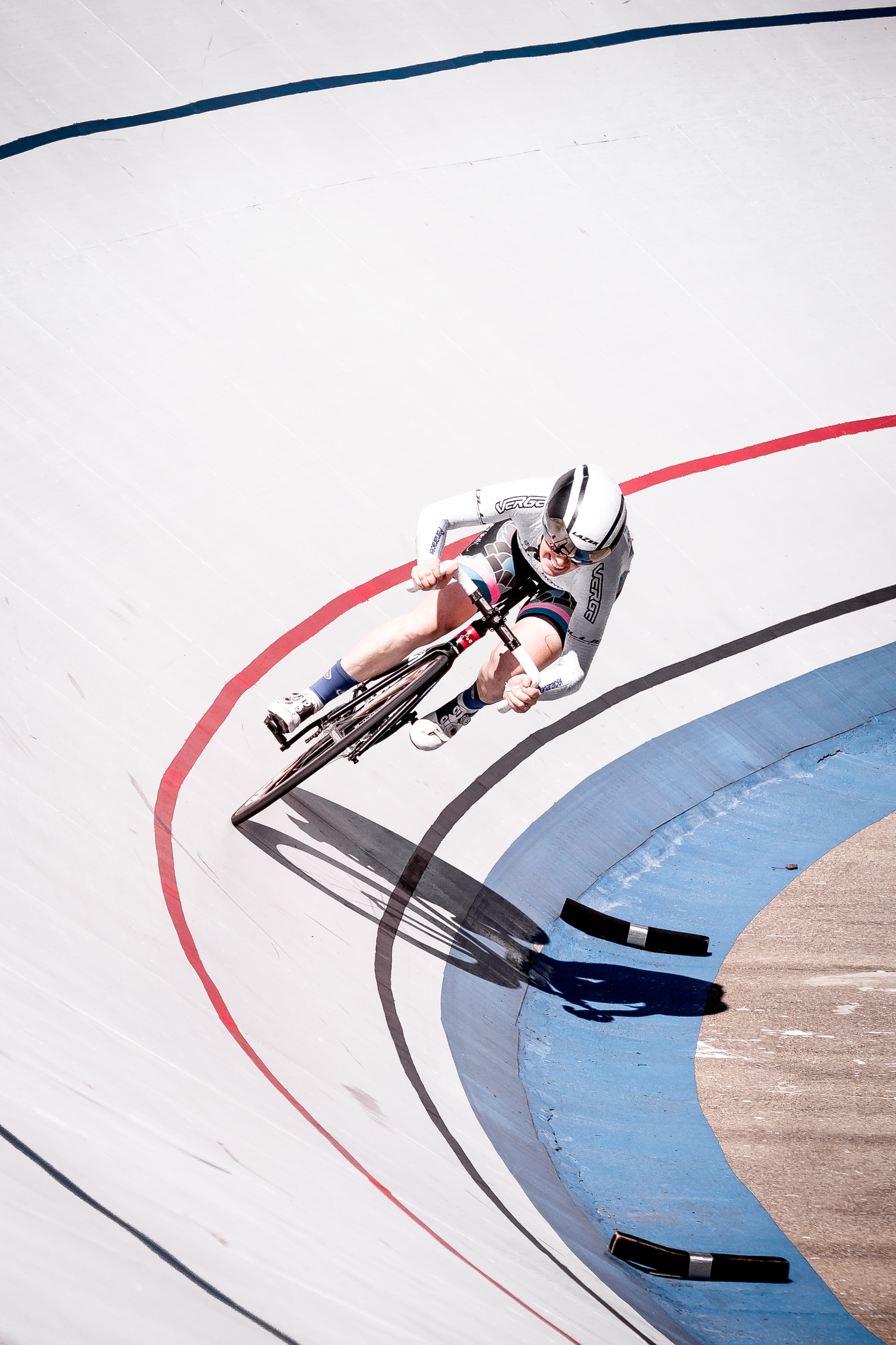
- Blais in 2016

Personal information
- Full name: Marie-Soleil Blais
- Born: 21 November 1988 (age 37)

Cycling career
- Sport: Cycling
- Discipline: Road
- Role: Rider

Professional teams
- 2017: Team Illuminate
- 2019: Astana
- 2020: Cogeas–Mettler–Look

Marie-Soleil Blais (born 21 November 1988) is a Canadian professional racing cyclist, who most recently rode for UCI Women's Continental Team Cogeas–Mettler–Look.
