= Scott Price (cyclist) =

Canadian bicycle racer

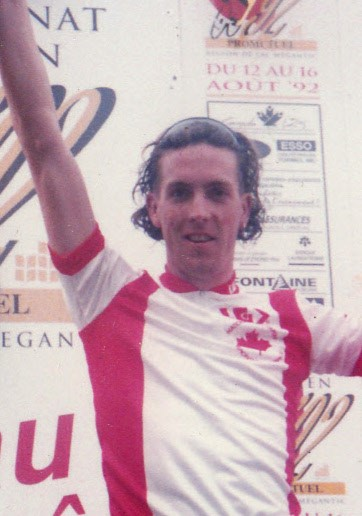
- Scott Price wearing the Canadian road champion jersey after winning in 1992 Lac Megantic, Quebec

Personal information
- Full name: Scott Price
- Born: October 5, 1969 (age 57) Calgary, Alberta

Cycling career
- Sport: Cycling
- Current team: Retired
- Role: Rider

Major wins
- Canadian National Road Race

Scott Price (born October 5, 1969) is a cycling coach and former Canadian professional road cyclist. His racing career spanned 18 years, racing for Cyclemeisters Calgary, Caja Rural, Strava Racing, Team Plymouth, Mercury, Landis, Higher Living Health and Performance and the Canadian National Team. He represented Canada at the Pan American Games in 1993 and was 2nd at the 1992 Olympic Trials.

Palmares

- • Canadian National Road Race Champion 1992
- • Pan American Games Team Member (Havana, Cuba)
- • Ironhorse Bicycle Classic Champion 1999, 2000, 2001
- • La Vuelta de Bisbee Champion 2000, 2001
- • Alberta Provincial Road Race Champion 1990
- • Colorado State Road Race Champion 1995
- • Tour de Peru Champion Stage 2 1998
- • Tour de Peru Champion Stage 4 Team Time Trial 1998
- • Tucson Bicycle Classic Champion 2000, 2001
- • 104 Career Victories
