= Jacques Landry =

Canadian cyclist

Personal information
- Born: 4 December 1969 (age 56) Saskatoon, Saskatchewan, Canada

Cycling career
- Sport: Cycling

Jacques Dalma Landry (born 4 December 1969) is a Canadian retired professional cyclist.

== Life ==
Landry was born in Saskatoon, Saskatchewan.

He represented Canada in the 1992 Olympic Games and the 1996 Olympic Games in the individual road race, where he finished 62nd and 88th.
