= Silber Pro Cycling Team =

Canadian cycling team

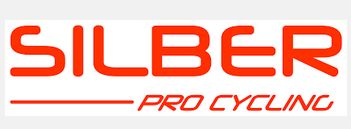

Team information
- UCI code: SPC
- Registered: Canada
- Founded: 2013
- Disbanded: 2018
- Discipline: Road
- Status: UCI Continental

Team name history
- 2013 2014–2018: Medique p/b Silber Investments; Silber Pro Cycling Team

Silber Pro Cycling Team was a Canadian UCI Continental cycling team established in 2013. The team began at the club-level as Team Medique (2012) and Team Medique p/b Silber Investments (2013), before gaining a UCI Continental license from 2014-2018 as Silber Pro Cycling. The General Direction was overseen by Scott Toguri McFarlane, a Montreal-based cycling coach and owner of Toguri Training. The Team Management and logistics was overseen by Claudine Gilbert. Gord Fraser was hired on a part-time basis in 2014 before becoming the full-time Sports Director from 2015-2018.

McFarlane initiated the team in 2012 to support his younger clients that were racing at the time, but Silber Pro Cycling became the best team in Canada and one of the best in North America for 5 years. Members of McFarlane & Fraser's teams went on to win National Championships, receive pro contracts and to represent their countries at the World Championships. In 2018, Arthur Silber stepped down as title sponsor, but the team was thrown a lifeline when Floyd Landis used proceeds from the settlement of the Lance Armstrong whistleblower lawsuit to give back to cycling and to support younger riders. Landis became title sponsor of Floyd's Pro Cycling in 2019.

== Team roster ==
Rider	Date of birth
Stephen Bassett (USA)	27 March 1995 (age 31)
Charles-etienne Chretien (CAN)	19 June 1999 (age 27)
Pier-André Côté (CAN)	24 April 1997 (age 29)
Alexander Cowan (CAN)	19 November 1996 (age 29)
Adam Jamieson (CAN)	12 February 1996 (age 30)
Emile Jean (CAN)	21 October 1993 (age 32)

Rider	Date of birth
Nicolas Masbourian (CAN)	27 January 1994 (age 32)
Adam Roberge (CAN)	27 March 1997 (age 29)
Ryan Roth (CAN)	10 January 1983 (age 43)
Travis Samuel (CAN)	18 October 1994 (age 31)
Marc-Antoine Soucy (CAN)	22 April 1995 (age 31)
Graydon Staples (CAN)	30 October 1999 (age 26)
Danick Vandale (CAN)	7 December 1995 (age 30)
Nickolas Zukowsky (CAN)	3 June 1998 (age 28)

== Major wins ==
2015
Stage 5 Tour de Beauce, Ben Perry
Overall Grand Prix Cycliste de Saguenay, Matteo Dal-Cin

Stage 1, Matteo Dal-Cin

2016
Canada Time Trial Championships, Ryan Roth
Winston Salem Cycling Classic, Ryan Roth
Overall Grand Prix Cycliste de Saguenay, Ryan Roth

Stage 1, Ben Perry

Overall Redlands Bicycle Classic, Matteo Dal-Cin
Stage 1 Tour of Utah, Kris Dahl
2017
Stage 2 Grand Prix Cycliste de Saguenay, Émile Jean
Stage 3a (ITT) Tour de Beauce, Alec Cowan
2018
Stage 2 Joe Martin Stage Race, Alec Cowan
Stage 1 Tour de Beauce, Pier-André Coté

== National champions ==
2015
Canada U23 Time Trial, Alex Cataford
Canada Road U23, Ben Perry
Canada Criterium, Ben Perry

2016
Canada Time Trial, Ryan Roth
Canada Road U23, Ben Perry
Canada Criterium, Ben Perry
