= Grand Prix Cycliste de Saguenay =

Canadian multi-day road cycling race

Race details
- Date: May or June
- Region: Quebec, Canada
- Discipline: Road
- Competition: UCI America Tour 2.2
- Type: Stage race
- Web site: grandprixcyclistesaguenay.com/en/index/

History
- First edition: 2014
- Editions: 5 (as of 2019)
- First winner: Jure Kocjan (SLO)
- Most wins: No repeat winners
- Most recent: Nickolas Zukowsky (CAN)

The Grand Prix Cycliste de Saguenay is a bicycle stage race held annually in Saguenay, Quebec. It is part of the UCI America Tour, as a 2.2 category event. It was formed in 2014 after the previous Coupe des nations Ville Saguenay – a race reserved to riders between 19 and 22 of age and rated 2.Ncup by the UCI between 2008 and 2013 – was removed from the UCI Nations Cup calendar.

The Grand Prix Cycliste de Saguenay is held in the same area, but is now open to trade teams.

== Results ==
Year	Country	Rider	Team
2014	Slovenia	Jure Kocjan	Team SmartStop
2015	Canada	Matteo Dal-Cin	Silber Pro Cycling Team
2016	Canada	Ryan Roth	Silber Pro Cycling Team
2017	United States	Steve Fisher	Hangar 15 Bicycles
2018	No race		
2019	Canada	Nickolas Zukowsky	Floyd's Pro Cycling
2020	No race due to organizational reasons		
2021	No race due to the COVID-19 pandemic in Canada		
2022	No race due to organizational reasons		
