= Tour de Beauce =

Canadian road cycling race

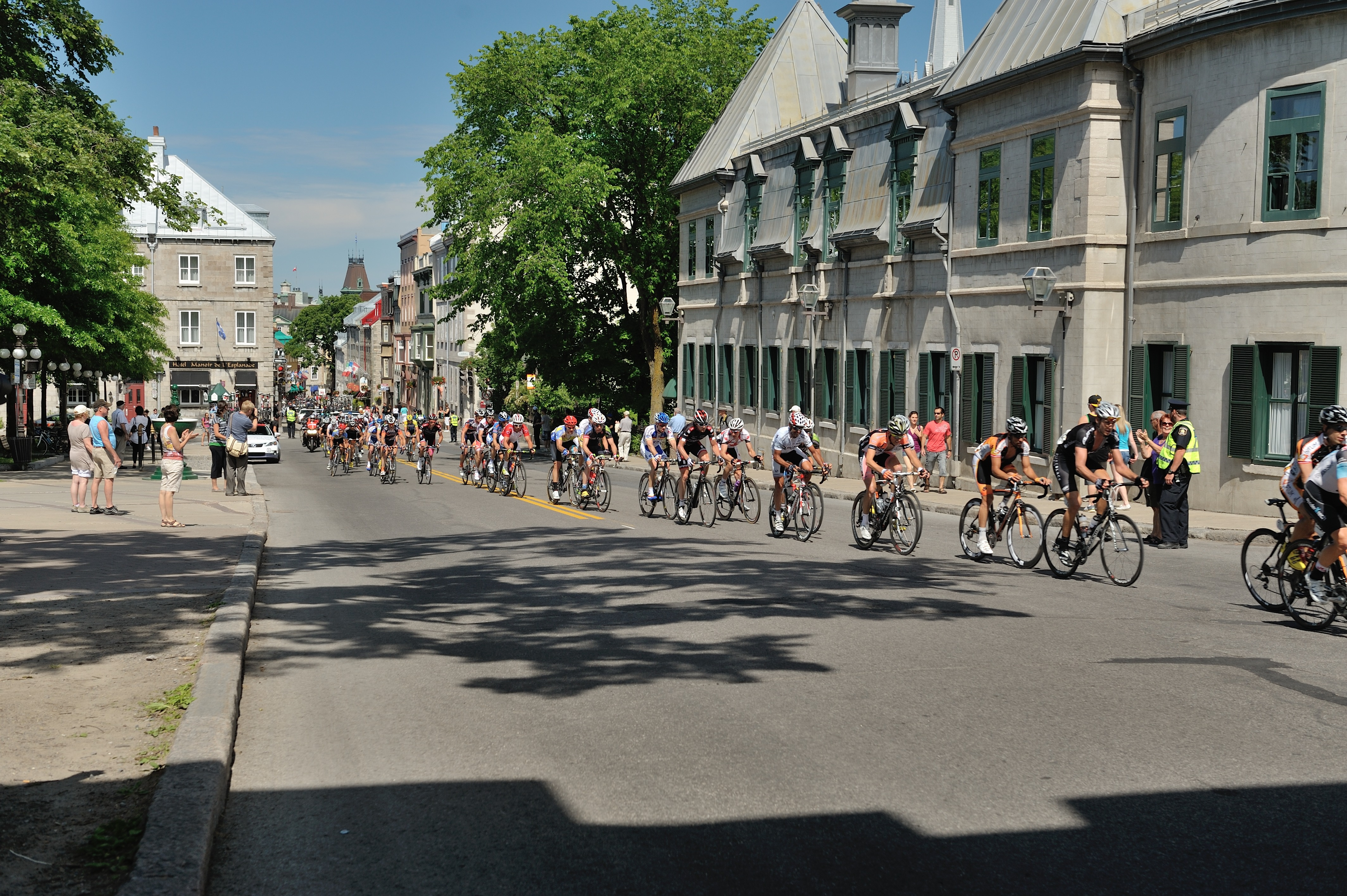
- Tour de Beauce 2012

Race details
- Date: June
- Region: Quebec, Canada
- English name: Tour de Beauce
- Discipline: Road race
- Competition: UCI America Tour
- Type: Stage race
- Organiser: Canadian Cycling Federation
- Web site: www.tourdebeauce.com

History
- First edition: 1986; 40 years ago
- Editions: 38 (as of 2026)
- First winner: James Gilles (CAN)
- Most wins: Benjamin Day (AUS) (2 wins)
- Most recent: Wilmar Paredes (COL)

Tour de Beauce (French: [tuʁ də bos]) is a men's elite professional road bicycle racing multi-day event held each June in the Beauce region of Quebec, Canada since 1986. It is the oldest stage-race in North America, and is a Union Cycliste Internationale (UCI)-rated 2.2 continental circuit stage race on the UCI America Tour.

The Queen Stage of the Tour de Beauce features the ascension of the iconic Mont-Mégantic National Park, a 6-km climb averaging 10% and peaking at 18% on the highest elevation road in the Province of Quebec.

The race has five stages, including two half-stages, one of which is usually held in Quebec City. Quebec has hosted a stage of the Tour de Beauce for 25 consecutive years.

== Classifications ==
The race has five individual classifications, and the leader in each wears a special jersey.

- Yellow jersey: General classification (overall leader)
- White jersey: Sprint classification
- Polka dot jersey: Mountains classification
- Red jersey: Young rider classification
- Blue jersey: Winner of Quebec City Stage

== Past winners ==
=== General classification ===
Year	Winner	Team
1986	James Gilles (CAN)	
1987	Yvan Waddell (CAN)	
1988	Gervais Rioux (CAN)	
1989	Sean Way (CAN)	
1990	Graeme Miller (NZL)	
1991	Czeslaw Lukaszewicz (CAN)	
1992	Jean-Christophe Currit (FRA)	
1993	Marty Jemison (USA)	
1994	Jacques Landry (CAN)	
1995	Eric Wohlberg (CAN)	
1996	Igor Bonciucov (MDA)	
1997	Jonathan Vaughters (USA)	
1998	Levi Leipheimer (USA)	(United States) Saturn Cycling Team
1999	~~Levi Leipheimer (USA)~~	~~(United States) Saturn Cycling Team~~
2000	Tomáš Konečný (CZE)	(Czech Republic) Wüstenrot–ZVVZ
2001	Henk Vogels (AUS)	(United States) Mercury–Viatel
2002	Michael Rogers (AUS)	(Belgium) Mapei–Quick-Step
2003	John Lieswyn (USA)	(United States) 7 Up/Maxxis
2004	Tomasz Brożyna (POL)	(Poland) Action
2005	Nathan O'Neill (AUS)	(United States) Navigators Insurance
2006	Valery Kobzarenko (UKR)	(United States) Navigators Insurance
2007	Ben Day (AUS)	(United States) Navigators Insurance
2008	Svein Tuft (CAN)	(Canada) Symmetrics
2009	Scott Zwizanski (USA)	(Canada) Kelly Benefit Strategies
2010	Ben Day (AUS)	Fly V Australia
2011	Francisco Mancebo (ESP)	(United States) Realcyclist.com Cycling Team
2012	Rory Sutherland (AUS)	(United States) UnitedHealthcare
2013	Nathan Brown (USA)	(United States) Bontrager Cycling Team
2014	Toms Skujiņš (LAT)	(United States) Hincapie Sportswear Development Team
2015	Pello Bilbao (SPA)	(Spain) Caja Rural–Seguros RGA
2016	Gregory Daniel (USA)	(United States) Axeon–Hagens Berman
2017	Andžs Flaksis (LAT)	(United States) Holowesko Citadel Racing Team
2018	James Piccoli (CAN)	(United States) Elevate–KHS Pro Cycling
2019	Brendan Rhim (USA)	(United States) Arapahoe Hincapie p/b BMC
No race between 2020 and 2022 due to the COVID-19 pandemic in Quebec
2023	Luke Valenti (CAN)	(United States) Team Ecoflo Chronos
2024	Josh Burnett (NZL)	(New Zealand) MitoQ–NZ Cycling Project
2025	Diego Camargo (COL)	(Colombia) Team Medellín–EPM
2026	Wilmar Paredes (COL)	(Colombia) Team Medellín–EPM

=== Points classification ===
Year	Winner	Team
2001	Czeslaw Lukaszewicz (CAN)	Team Canada
2002	Lubor Tesař (CZE)	(Germany) Nürnberger – Versicherung
2003	John Lieswyn (USA)	(United States) 7 Up/Maxxis
2004	Viktor Rapinski (BLR)	(United States) Navigators Insurance
2005	David O'Loughlin (IRL)	(United States) Navigators Insurance
2006	Sergey Lagutin (UZB)	(United States) Navigators Insurance
2007	Ben Day (AUS)	(United States) Navigators Insurance
2008	Moisés Aldape (MEX)	(Mexico) Team Type 1
2009	Danilo Wyss (SUI)	(United States) BMC Racing Team
2010	Ben Day (AUS)	Fly V Australia
2011	Francisco Mancebo (ESP)	(United States) Realcyclist.com Cycling Team
2012	Francisco Mancebo (ESP)	(United States) Competitive Cyclist Racing Team
2013	Nathan Brown (USA)	(United States) Bontrager Cycling Team
2014	Toms Skujiņš (LAT)	(United States) Hincapie Sportswear Development Team
2015	Dion Smith (NZL)	(United States) Hincapie Racing Team
2016	Gregory Daniel (USA)	(United States) Axeon–Hagens Berman
2017	Robin Carpenter (USA)	(United States) Holowesko Citadel Racing Team
2018	Serghei Țvetcov (ROM)	(United States) UnitedHealthcare
2019	Brendan Rhim (USA)	(United States) Arapahoe Hincapie p/b BMC
No race between 2020 and 2022 due to the COVID-19 pandemic in Quebec
2023	Tyler Stites (USA)	(United States) Project Echelon Racing
2024	Brendan Rhim (USA)	(United States) Project Echelon Racing

=== Mountains classification ===
Year	Winner	Team
2000	Jaroslav Bílek (CZE)	(Czech Republic) Wüstenrot–ZVVZ
2001	Arquimedes Lam (MEX)	(Mexico) Tecos – Mercurio
2002	Chris Baldwin (USA)	(United States) Navigators
2003	Irving Aguilar (MEX)	(Mexico) Tecos – Mercurio
2004	Jeff Louder (USA)	(United States) Navigators Insurance
2005	Wojciech Kalemba (POL)	(Poland) Paged-MBK-Scout
2006	Francisco Colorado (COL)	Colombia es Pasión
2007	Gregorio Ladino (COL)	(Mexico) Tecos Trek VH
2008	Glen Chadwick (NZL)	(New Zealand) Team Type 1
2009	Darwin Atapuma (COL)	(Colombia) Colombian National Team
2010	Daniel Summerhill (USA)	(United States) Felt–Holowesko Partners
2011	Scott Lyttle (NZL)	(New Zealand) PureBlack Racing
2012	Ken Hanson (USA)	(United States) Optum–Kelly Benefit Strategies
2013	Pat McCarty (USA)	(United States) Bissell
2014	Joshua Berry (USA)	(United States) Team SmartStop
2015	Mauricio Ortega (COL)	(Colombia) Orgullo Antioqueño
2016	Robert Squire (USA)	(United States) Holowesko Citadel Racing Team
2017	Nigel Ellsay (CAN)	(Canada) Silber Pro Cycling Team
2018	Ben Perry (CAN)	Israel Cycling Academy
2019	Óscar Eduardo Sánchez (COL)	(Mexico) Canel's–Specialized
No race between 2020 and 2022 due to the COVID-19 pandemic in Quebec
2023	Eric Inkster (CAN)	(Canada) Cycling BC
2024	Liam Flanagan (USA)	(United States) Team Skyline

=== Team classification ===
Year	Winner	Country
2000	Wüstenrot–ZVVZ	Czech Republic
2001	Mróz–Supradyn Witaminy	Poland
2002	Team Nürnberger Versicherung	Germany
2003	Ed' System ZVVZ	Czech Republic
2004	Hoop–CCC–Polsat	Poland
2005	Navigators Insurance (NIC)	United States
2006	Navigators Insurance (NIC)	United States
2007	Navigators Insurance (NIC)	United States
2008	Team Type 1 (TT1)	United States
2009	Fly V Australia (FVA)	Australia
2010	Fly V Australia (FVA)	Australia
2011	SpiderTech–C10 (CSM)	Canada
2012	UnitedHealthcare (UHC)	United States
2013	UnitedHealthcare (UHC)	United States
2014	Hincapie Sportswear Development Team (HSD)	United States
2015	Caja Rural–Seguros RGA (CJR)	Spain
2016	Holowesko Citadel Racing Team (HSD)	United States
2017	Hangar 15 Bicycles (CYN)	United States
2018	Hagens Berman Axeon (AHB)	United States
2019	Floyd's Pro Cycling (FPC)	Canada
No race between 2020 and 2022 due to the COVID-19 pandemic in Quebec
2023	Team Ecoflo Chronos (TEC)	Canada
2024	Team Skyline (TSL)	United States
