= 2012 Tour of California =

UCI America Tour

Race details
- Dates: May 13–20, 2012
- Stages: 8
- Distance: 735.6 mi (1,184 km)
- Winning time: 30h 42' 32"

Results
Jersey awarded to the overall winner	Winner	Robert Gesink (Netherlands)	(Rabobank)
	Second	David Zabriskie (United States)	(Garmin–Barracuda)
	Third	Tom Danielson (United States)	(Garmin–Barracuda)
Jersey awarded to the mountains classification winner	Mountains	Sebastian Salas (Canada)	(Optum–Kelly Benefit Strategies)
Jersey awarded to the youth classification winner	Youth	Wilco Kelderman (Netherlands)	(Rabobank)
Jersey awarded to the sprints classification winner	Sprints	Peter Sagan (Slovakia)	(Liquigas–Cannondale)
	Team	RadioShack–Nissan	

The 2012 Amgen Tour of California was the seventh running of the Tour of California cycling stage race. It was held from May 13–20, and was rated as a 2.HC event on the UCI America Tour. It began in Santa Rosa and concluded in front of Los Angeles's Staples Center after eight stages. As per the Union Cycliste Internationale rules adopted in 2011, the use of race radios was prohibited, since only the events which are designated UCI World Tour events can use the devices.

The event was marked by two major performances: Rabobank's Robert Gesink winning Stage 7 finishing in Mount Baldy to secure the overall classification victory and Peter Sagan of Liquigas–Cannondale dominating the sprint finishes, taking 5 stage wins and the sprinter jersey.

== Participating teams ==
Sixteen teams were participating in the Tour of California, including eight UCI ProTeams, four UCI Professional Continental teams, and four UCI Continental teams. They were:

- Ag2r–La Mondiale
- Argos–Shimano
- Bissell
- BMC Racing Team
- Bontrager–Livestrong
- Colombia–Coldeportes
- Team Exergy
- Garmin–Barracuda
- Liquigas–Cannondale
- Omega Pharma–Quick-Step
- Optum–Kelly Benefit Strategies
- Orica–GreenEDGE
- Rabobank
- RadioShack–Nissan
- SpiderTech–C10
- UnitedHealthcare

== Stages ==
=== Stage 1 ===
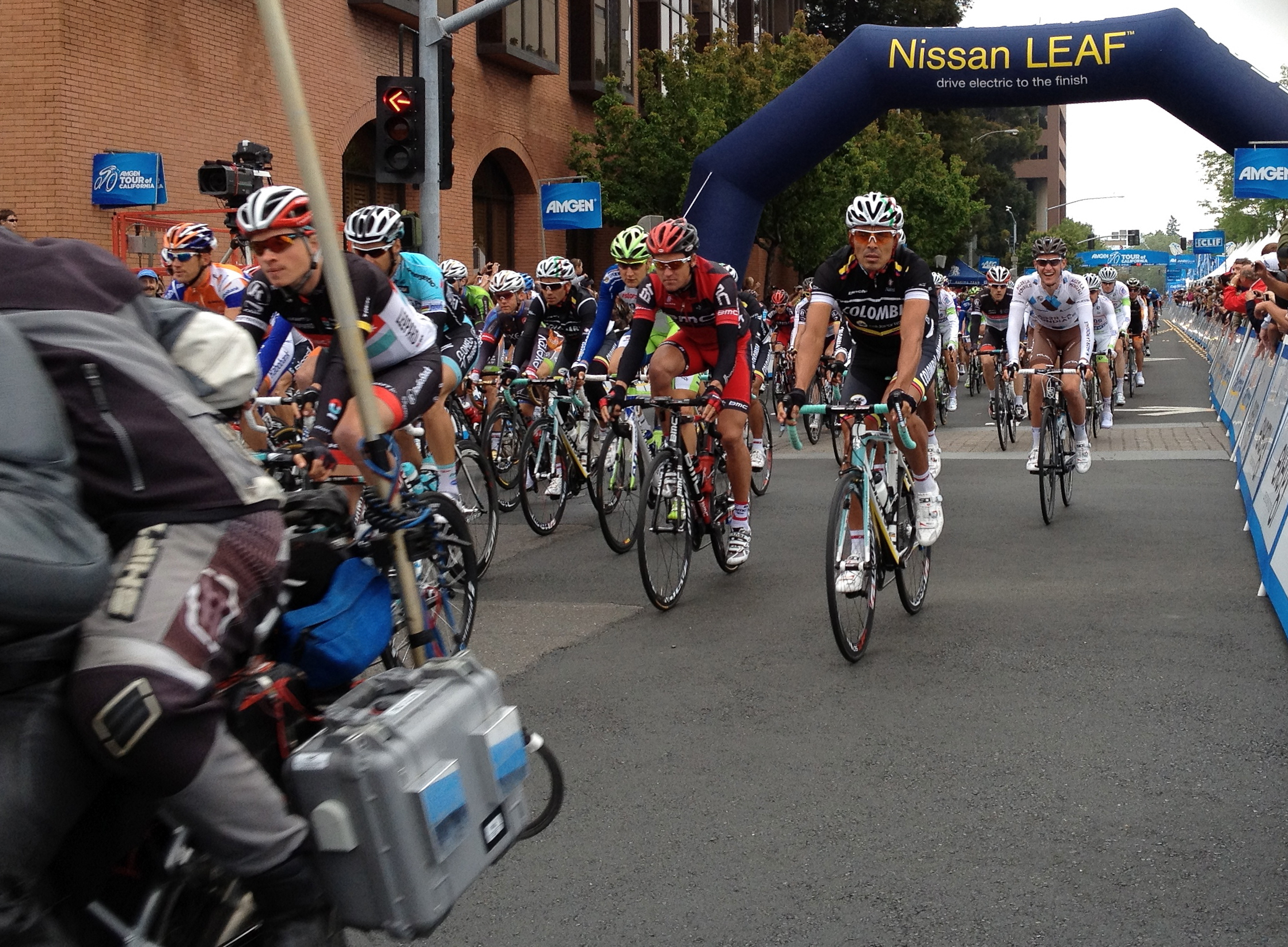
Start of stage 1 in Santa Rosa.

May 13, 2012 — Santa Rosa to Santa Rosa, 115.9 miles (186.5 km) — Intermediate stage

Eight men escaped very early in the race and built a sizable gap with the peloton. Among them was Canadian David Boily (SpiderTech–C10), who won all four of the King of the Mountains competitions along the way, claiming the red jersey. The climbs were graded category 3 and 4, and the break held a maximum lead of eleven minutes. With 4.5 miles (7.2 km) to go in the race, the 3 remaining breakaway companions, Ben Jacques-Maynes (Bissell), Maxime Bouet (Ag2r–La Mondiale) and Jeff Louder (UnitedHealthcare) shook hands to congratulate each other for the nice effort since the bunch was 10 seconds behind them and reeled them in moments later. Almost at the same time the peloton caught the break, Peter Sagan (Liquigas–Cannondale) had a puncture. He worked his way back and avoided a crash that occurred with 2 miles (3.2 km) to go. His teammate Daniel Oss piloted him in the last few kilometers, and Sagan out sprinted his rivals.

Stage 1 results

	Cyclist	Team	Time
1	Peter Sagan (SVK)	Liquigas–Cannondale	4h 42' 35"
2	Heinrich Haussler (AUS)	Garmin–Barracuda	s.t.
3	Fred Rodriguez (USA)	Team Exergy	s.t.
4	Leigh Howard (AUS)	Orica–GreenEDGE	s.t.
5	Greg Van Avermaet (BEL)	BMC Racing Team	s.t.
6	George Hincapie (USA)	BMC Racing Team	s.t.
7	Ryan Anderson (CAN)	SpiderTech–C10	s.t.
8	Stijn Vandenbergh (BEL)	Omega Pharma–Quick-Step	s.t.
9	Lawson Craddock (USA)	Bontrager–Livestrong	s.t.
10	Luis León Sánchez (ESP)	Rabobank	s.t.

General Classification after Stage 1

	Cyclist	Team	Time
1	Peter Sagan (SVK)	Liquigas–Cannondale	4h 42' 25"
2	Heinrich Haussler (AUS)	Garmin–Barracuda	+ 4"
3	Jeff Louder (USA)	UnitedHealthcare	+ 4"
4	Fred Rodriguez (USA)	Team Exergy	+ 6"
5	Ben Jacques-Maynes (USA)	Bissell	+ 6"
6	Joshua Atkins (AUS)	Bontrager–Livestrong	+ 9"
7	Leigh Howard (AUS)	Orica–GreenEDGE	+ 10"
8	Greg Van Avermaet (BEL)	BMC Racing Team	+ 10"
9	George Hincapie (USA)	BMC Racing Team	+ 10"
10	Ryan Anderson (CAN)	SpiderTech–C10	+ 10"

=== Stage 2 ===
May 14, 2012 — San Francisco to Santa Cruz County, 117.1 miles (188.5 km) — Intermediate stage

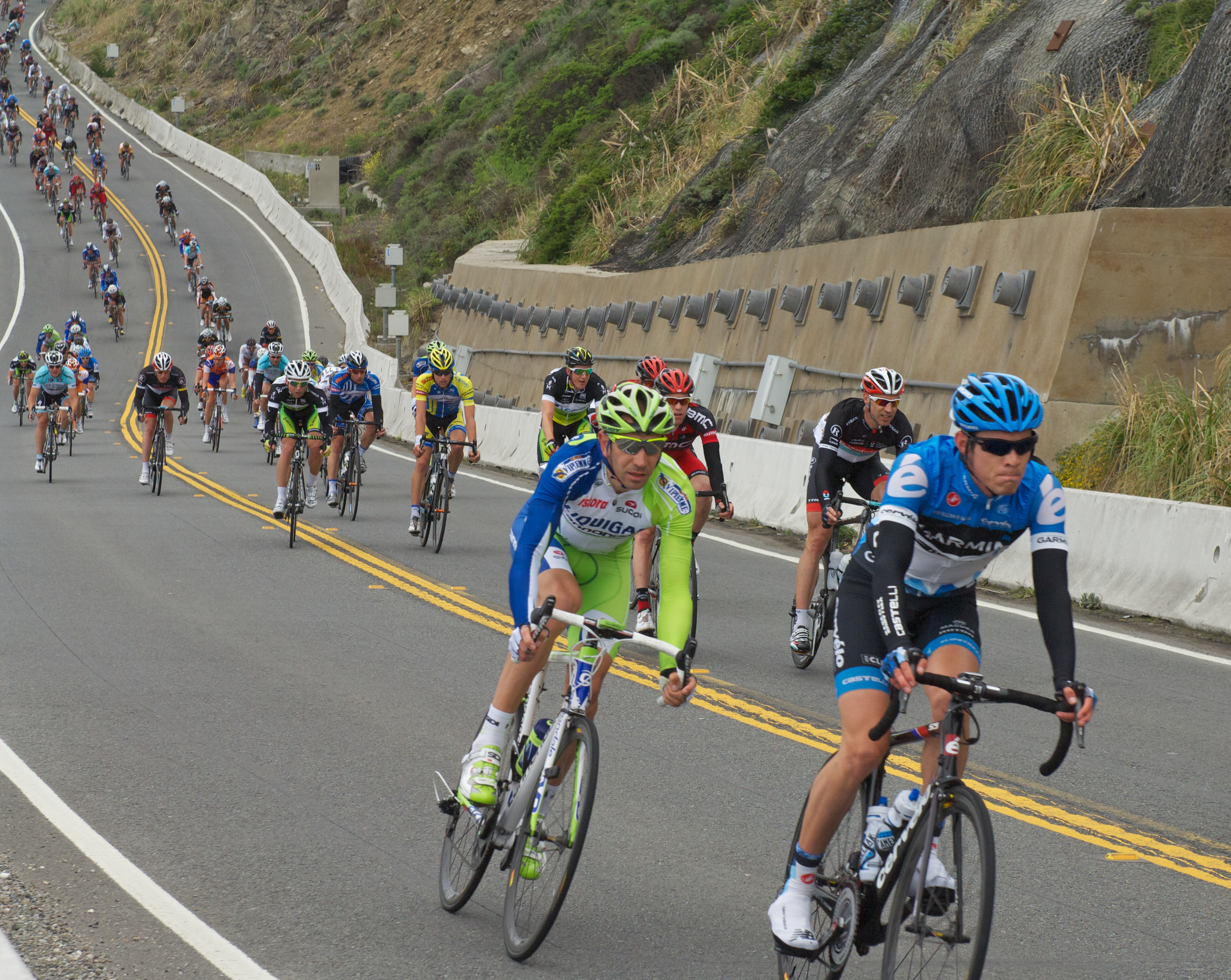
The peloton descends Highway 1 at Devils Slide in Pacifica on Stage 2

The stage included two major climbs: racers were faced with the Empire Grade difficulty (Category 1) at 123.9 kilometres (77.0 mi) from the start, and they tackled with the Bear Creek climb (Category 2) at the 154.7 kilometres (96.1 mi) mark. Race leader Peter Sagan was part of a crash that occurred near the top of the Empire Grade climb, but he could recover and got back on his bike after some on-the-fly repairs by the team's mechanic. Alexandre Geniez from Argos–Shimano was part of an early break with 5 other riders and was the lone surviving escapee, but was caught on the last climb of the day with 35 kilometres (22 mi) to go. He was rewarded for his efforts with the "Most Aggressive rider" jersey. A bunch composed of about 60 units came charging in Santa Cruz, with all the overall classification contenders present. Rory Sutherland from UnitedHealthcare broke away with about 2.5 kilometres (1.6 mi) to cover in a bid to win the stage and the 10 seconds bonus given to the victor, but his effort proved to be in vain as he was reeled back in shortly after the 1 kilometre (0.62 mi) mark. The Liquigas–Cannondale train dragged Sagan to the last corner, a right bend with the finish line only a couple hundred meters away. Sagan was first out of the corner and accelerated to the finish, taking his second victory in a row.

Stage 2 results

	Cyclist	Team	Time
1	Peter Sagan (SVK)	Liquigas–Cannondale	5h 02' 00"
2	Heinrich Haussler (AUS)	Garmin–Barracuda	s.t.
3	Leigh Howard (AUS)	Orica–GreenEDGE	s.t.
4	Koen de Kort (NED)	Argos–Shimano	s.t.
5	Fred Rodriguez (USA)	Team Exergy	s.t.
6	Greg Van Avermaet (BEL)	BMC Racing Team	s.t.
7	Lawson Craddock (USA)	Bontrager–Livestrong	s.t.
8	Marc de Maar (CUW)	UnitedHealthcare	s.t.
9	Tom Dumoulin (NED)	Argos–Shimano	s.t.
10	Peter Velits (SVK)	Omega Pharma–Quick-Step	s.t.

General Classification after Stage 2

	Cyclist	Team	Time
1	Peter Sagan (SVK)	Liquigas–Cannondale	9h 44' 15"
2	Heinrich Haussler (AUS)	Garmin–Barracuda	+ 8"
3	Leigh Howard (AUS)	Orica–GreenEDGE	+ 13"
4	Jeff Louder (USA)	UnitedHealthcare	+ 14"
5	Fred Rodriguez (USA)	Team Exergy	+ 16"
6	Ben Jacques-Maynes (USA)	Bissell	+ 16"
7	Marc de Maar (CUW)	UnitedHealthcare	+ 17"
8	Markel Irizar (ESP)	RadioShack–Nissan	+ 19"
9	Joshua Atkins (AUS)	Bontrager–Livestrong	+ 19"
10	Greg Van Avermaet (BEL)	BMC Racing Team	+ 20"

=== Stage 3 ===
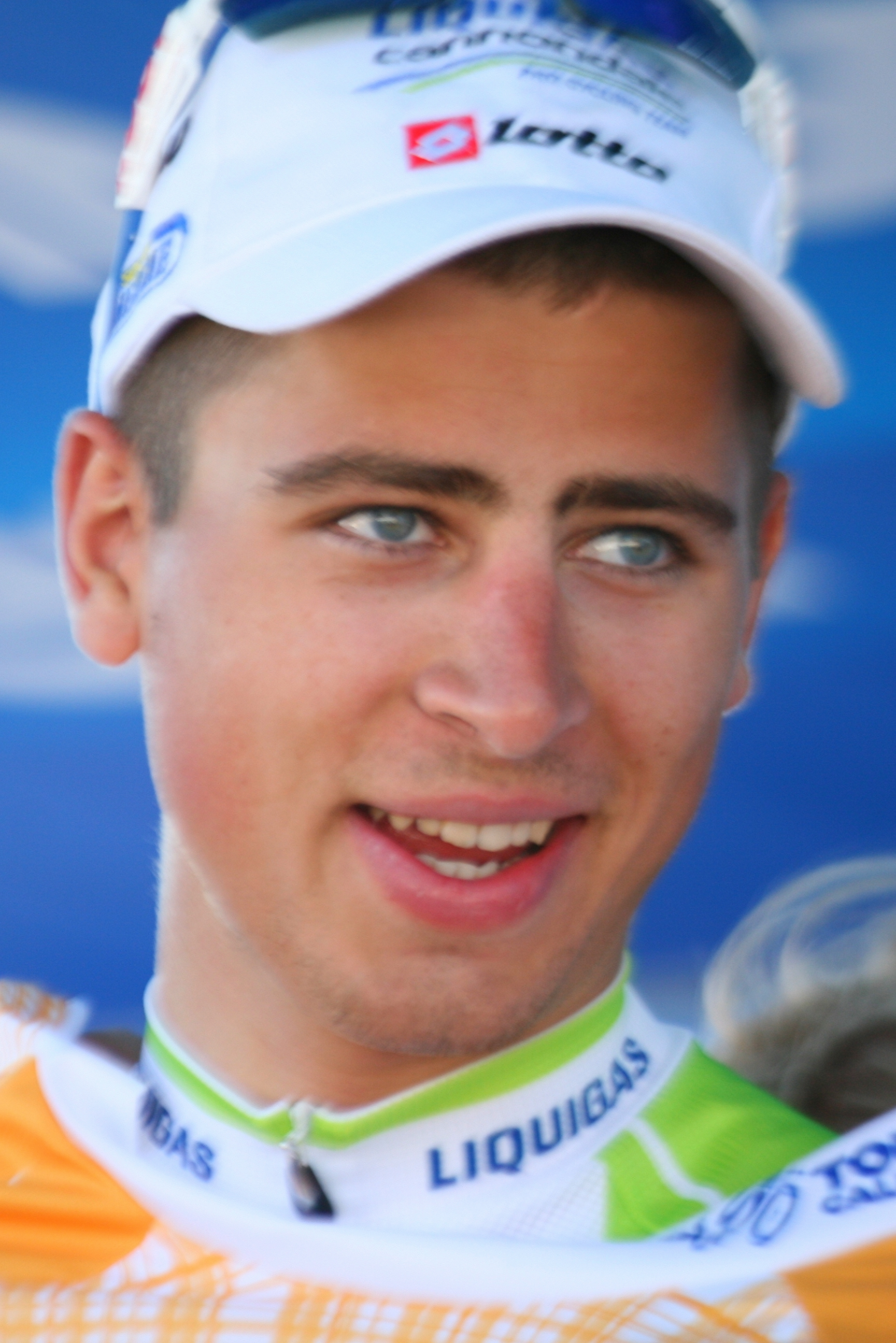
Peter Sagan on the podium after winning stage 2.

May 15, 2012 — San Jose to Livermore, 115.3 miles (185.6 km) — Intermediate stage

For the first time in the race's history, the riders were set to climb Mount Diablo (Category 2) about midway through the course. The crowd of spectators was densely packed at that well-known landmark. Another crucial part of the journey was the Patterson Pass (Category 3), which summit is situated 9.3 miles (15.0 km) away from the finish line in Livermore. A breakaway composed of 4 men formed atop the first climb of the day, Calaveras Road (Category 4), including Sebastian Salas of Optum–Kelly Benefit Strategies whose team manager stated prior to the stage that their main objective was now the red jersey awarded to the best climber. Salas did exactly what his team had planned, raking in enough points to take the lead in the King of the Mountains competition. The peloton got back to the break with 25 kilometres (16 mi) to race, and they prepared for a bunch finish as they descended towards the line. Heinrich Haussler (Garmin–Barracuda) led the sprint, but was passed shortly before the finish by the winner of the first 2 stages, Peter Sagan of Liquigas–Cannondale. Sagan stated after his third consecutive success that he was surprised to be a part of the finale since the Patterson Pass' climb was a steep one and was situated very close to the end of the race.

Stage 3 results

	Cyclist	Team	Time
1	Peter Sagan (SVK)	Liquigas–Cannondale	4h 50' 49"
2	Heinrich Haussler (AUS)	Garmin–Barracuda	s.t.
3	Tom Boonen (BEL)	Omega Pharma–Quick-Step	s.t.
4	Alex Candelario (USA)	Optum–Kelly Benefit Strategies	s.t.
5	Lloyd Mondory (FRA)	Ag2r–La Mondiale	s.t.
6	Fred Rodriguez (USA)	Team Exergy	s.t.
7	Hugo Houle (CAN)	SpiderTech–C10	s.t.
8	Koen de Kort (NED)	Argos–Shimano	s.t.
9	Michael Matthews (AUS)	Rabobank	s.t.
10	Wesley Sulzberger (AUS)	Orica–GreenEDGE	s.t.

General Classification after Stage 3

	Cyclist	Team	Time
1	Peter Sagan (SVK)	Liquigas–Cannondale	14h 34' 54"
2	Heinrich Haussler (AUS)	Garmin–Barracuda	+ 12"
3	Jeff Louder (USA)	UnitedHealthcare	+ 24"
4	Fred Rodriguez (USA)	Team Exergy	+ 26"
5	Ben Jacques-Maynes (USA)	Bissell	+ 26"
6	Marc de Maar (CUW)	UnitedHealthcare	+ 27"
7	Markel Irizar (ESP)	RadioShack–Nissan	+ 29"
8	Joshua Atkins (AUS)	Bontrager–Livestrong	+ 29"
9	Greg Van Avermaet (BEL)	BMC Racing Team	+ 30"
10	Lawson Craddock (USA)	Bontrager–Livestrong	+ 30"

=== Stage 4 ===
May 16, 2012 — Sonora to Clovis, 130.2 miles (209.5 km) — Mountain stage

The longest stage of the 2012 Tour of California was also the one with the greatest number of categorized climbs, since the peloton had to tackle with six of them and compose with high temperatures. Red jersey wearer Sebastian Salas (Optum–Kelly Benefit Strategies) conquered the first difficulty of the day in front of the peloton, ultimately earning enough points to keep the best climber's jersey at the end of the stage. A number of breaks formed, but ultimately all of them were swallowed by the bunch, the most significant effort being led by a group of 11 riders with a maximum lead of 5' 25". After going past the last climb of the day, category 3 Crane Valley Road, the peloton regrouped on the descent to Clovis with all the favorites. After an attempt by David Zabriskie of Garmin–Barracuda to solo onward to victory failed near the 1 kilometre (0.62 mi) mark, Peter Sagan sprinted out of his teammate's wheel, edging Heinrich Haussler on the line for the fourth day in a row. With this performance, Sagan broke the record for most Tour of California victories with seven, surpassing Levi Leipheimer (Omega Pharma–Quick-Step).

Stage 4 results

	Cyclist	Team	Time
1	Peter Sagan (SVK)	Liquigas–Cannondale	5h 18' 08"
2	Heinrich Haussler (AUS)	Garmin–Barracuda	s.t.
3	Michael Matthews (AUS)	Rabobank	s.t.
4	Tom Boonen (BEL)	Omega Pharma–Quick-Step	s.t.
5	Roger Kluge (GER)	Argos–Shimano	s.t.
6	Jasper Stuyven (BEL)	Bontrager–Livestrong	s.t.
7	Guillaume Boivin (CAN)	SpiderTech–C10	s.t.
8	Alexander Candelario (USA)	Optum–Kelly Benefit Strategies	s.t.
9	Leigh Howard (AUS)	Orica–GreenEDGE	s.t.
10	Lloyd Mondory (FRA)	Ag2r–La Mondiale	s.t.

General Classification after Stage 4

	Cyclist	Team	Time
1	Peter Sagan (SVK)	Liquigas–Cannondale	19h 52' 52"
2	Heinrich Haussler (AUS)	Garmin–Barracuda	+ 16"
3	Jeff Louder (USA)	UnitedHealthcare	+ 34"
4	Alex Howes (USA)	Garmin–Barracuda	+ 35"
5	Fred Rodriguez (USA)	Team Exergy	+ 36"
6	Ben Jacques-Maynes (USA)	Bissell	+ 36"
7	Markel Irizar (ESP)	RadioShack–Nissan	+ 36"
8	Marc de Maar (CUW)	UnitedHealthcare	+ 37"
9	Wilco Kelderman (NED)	Rabobank	+ 38"
10	Joshua Atkins (AUS)	Bontrager–Livestrong	+ 39"

=== Stage 5 ===
May 17, 2012 — Bakersfield, 18.4 miles (29.6 km), individual time trial (ITT) — Flat stage

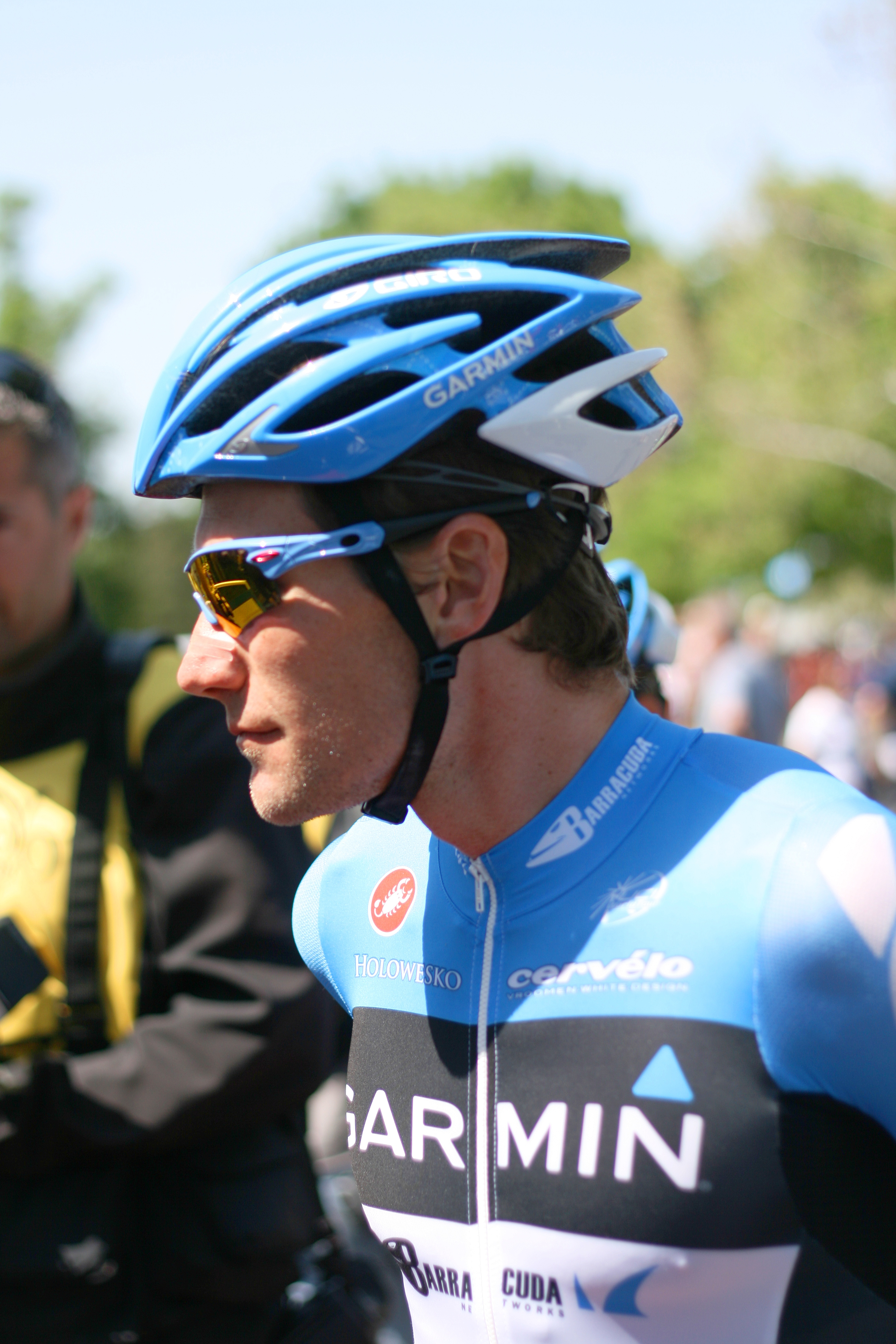
David Zabriskie dominated the fifth stage

The event was taking place under a sunny sky and temperatures exceeding 100 °F (38 °C). David Zabriskie of Garmin–Barracuda took the yellow jersey off the shoulders of Peter Sagan, with an advantage of 3' 27" over the former race leader, who finished in 52nd position. Zabriskie stopped the clock at 35' 59", and raced wearing a Captain America themed skinsuit. Forty-year-old RadioShack–Nissan rider Jens Voigt came in second place, with American Tejay van Garderen of BMC Racing Team rounding up the podium. Following the 18.4 miles (29.6 km) effort, the victor stated: “I came out here in February and videotaped the course. I had a few spots where I wanted to soft pedal but maintain speed. [...] Any course where I don’t have to get out of the aerobars is good for me.” Zabriskie had a 40 seconds deficit in the general classification coming into the stage.

Stage 5 results

	Cyclist	Team	Time
1	David Zabriskie (USA)	Garmin–Barracuda	35' 59"
2	Jens Voigt (GER)	RadioShack–Nissan	+ 23"
3	Tejay van Garderen (USA)	BMC Racing Team	+ 34"
4	Robert Gesink (NED)	Rabobank	+ 39"
5	Andrew Talansky (USA)	Garmin–Barracuda	+ 48"
6	Peter Velits (SVK)	Omega Pharma–Quick-Step	+ 49"
7	Maarten Tjallingii (NED)	Rabobank	+ 52"
8	Luke Durbridge (AUS)	Orica–GreenEDGE	+ 1' 01"
9	Tom Danielson (USA)	Garmin–Barracuda	+ 1' 07"
10	Rory Sutherland (AUS)	UnitedHealthcare	+ 1' 10"

General Classification after Stage 5

	Cyclist	Team	Time
1	David Zabriskie (USA)	Garmin–Barracuda	20h 29' 31"
2	Tejay van Garderen (USA)	BMC Racing Team	+ 34"
3	Robert Gesink (NED)	Rabobank	+ 39"
4	Andrew Talansky (USA)	Garmin–Barracuda	+ 48"
5	Peter Velits (SVK)	Omega Pharma–Quick-Step	+ 49"
6	Luke Durbridge (AUS)	Orica–GreenEDGE	+ 1' 01"
7	Tom Danielson (USA)	Garmin–Barracuda	+ 1' 07"
8	Rory Sutherland (AUS)	UnitedHealthcare	+ 1' 10"
9	Cameron Meyer (AUS)	Orica–GreenEDGE	+ 1' 26"
10	Markel Irizar (ESP)	RadioShack–Nissan	+ 1' 29"

=== Stage 6 ===
May 18, 2012 — Palmdale to Big Bear Lake, 115.7 miles (186.2 km) — Mountain stage

Seven riders broke away almost from the starting line, including David Boily and Sebastian Salas, who were battling it out for the red jersey. Boily came first atop the first difficulty of the day, but ultimately could not keep up with the pace of the breakaway and Salas remained the leader of the mountain's competition as the stage finished. Also included in this early break was Ag2r–La Mondiale rider Sylvain Georges, who remained in the escapee's bunch until it was reduced to two riders, very late in the stage. Sebastian Salas, approaching the last climb that would lead the race to Big Bear Lake, reportedly told Georges that he did not have the legs to continue cooperating with him, with 48 kilometres (30 mi) still to go. Georges continued on solo as he enjoyed a sizable lead, having a five minutes advantage on the peloton with 30 kilometres (19 mi) to go. He managed to hold on to sail to victory, taking the second win of the day and of the year for his team, since Sébastien Hinault took the third stage of Circuit de Lorraine a little earlier in the day. As he crossed the finish line, the bunch was in his back-view mirror, and Peter Sagan sprinted his way to second place.

Stage 6 results

	Cyclist	Team	Time
1	Sylvain Georges (FRA)	Ag2r–La Mondiale	5h 07' 06"
2	Peter Sagan (SVK)	Liquigas–Cannondale	+ 28"
3	Peter Velits (SVK)	Omega Pharma–Quick-Step	s.t.
4	Thomas Damuseau (FRA)	Argos–Shimano	s.t.
5	Tom Dumoulin (NED)	Argos–Shimano	s.t.
6	Greg van Avermaet (BEL)	BMC Racing Team	s.t.
7	Romain Bardet (FRA)	Ag2r–La Mondiale	s.t.
8	Christopher Horner (USA)	RadioShack–Nissan	s.t.
9	Tejay van Garderen (USA)	BMC Racing Team	s.t.
10	Robert Gesink (NED)	Rabobank	s.t.

General Classification after Stage 6

	Cyclist	Team	Time
1	David Zabriskie (USA)	Garmin–Barracuda	25h 37' 05"
2	Tejay van Garderen (USA)	BMC Racing Team	+ 34"
3	Robert Gesink (NED)	Rabobank	+ 39"
4	Peter Velits (SVK)	Omega Pharma–Quick-Step	+ 45"
5	Andrew Talansky (USA)	Garmin–Barracuda	+ 48"
6	Luke Durbridge (AUS)	Orica–GreenEDGE	+ 1' 01"
7	Tom Danielson (USA)	Garmin–Barracuda	+ 1' 07"
8	Rory Sutherland (AUS)	UnitedHealthcare	+ 1' 10"
9	Cameron Meyer (AUS)	Orica–GreenEDGE	+ 1' 26"
10	Lawson Craddock (USA)	Bontrager–Livestrong	+ 1' 30"

=== Stage 7 ===
May 19, 2012 — Ontario to Mount Baldy, 78.3 miles (126.0 km) — Mountain stage

The race included three categorized climbs, including a finish at the base of the Mount Baldy ski lifts, an ascension that would take the riders to an altitude of 1,950 metres (6,400 ft). Right from the start, a breakaway formed, initiated by Jens Voigt (RadioShack–Nissan) and Dries Devenyns (Omega Pharma–Quick-Step). After 20 kilometres (12 mi) of racing, the break had ballooned to 14 riders, including four units from the RadioShack–Nissan squad. Back in the group, general classification contender Tejay van Garderen of BMC Racing Team survived a scare when he punctured while descending the first categorized difficulty of the day, but a teammate was there to promptly give him his wheel. Chris Horner (RadioShack–Nissan), who was part of the break, left the escapees behind, accompanied by Darwin Atapuma of Colombia–Coldeportes. At one point, the duo enjoyed a 3' 50" advantage over the bunch and David Zabriskie, making Horner the virtual leader. On the slopes of Mount Baldy, with 5.5 kilometres (3.4 mi) to go, the chasing bunch was reduced to 15 riders including Zabriskie. Rabobank's Robert Gesink then accelerated toward the top of the climb, dropping everyone in his group except Tom Danielson (Garmin–Sharp) who was the last to go away. Gesink caught Atapuma near the final kilometer banner, was passed by the Colombian on the inside in the penultimate turn, passed him again but took the final left bend very wide, almost colliding with the barriers. Gesink produced a last sprint that would carry him over the line as the victor. With that victory, Gesink took the yellow jersey. He stated: “This is amazing. At the end of last year I crashed and broke my leg. In January I still had to learn how to walk. Now I’m back. I’ve been working really, really hard the last few months.”

Stage 7 results

	Cyclist	Team	Time
1	Robert Gesink (NED)	Rabobank	3h 37' 08"
2	Darwin Atapuma (COL)	Colombia–Coldeportes	s.t.
3	Fabio Duarte (COL)	Colombia–Coldeportes	+ 14"
4	Joseph Dombrowski (USA)	Bontrager–Livestrong	+ 18"
5	Tom Danielson (USA)	Garmin–Barracuda	+ 26"
6	Christopher Horner (USA)	RadioShack–Nissan	+ 38"
7	Wilco Kelderman (NED)	Rabobank	+ 1' 04"
8	Tiago Machado (POR)	RadioShack–Nissan	+ 1' 06"
9	Levi Leipheimer (USA)	Omega Pharma–Quick-Step	+ 1' 08"
10	Tejay van Garderen (USA)	BMC Racing Team	+ 1' 22"

General Classification after Stage 7

	Cyclist	Team	Time
1	Robert Gesink (NED)	Rabobank	29h 14' 52"
2	David Zabriskie (USA)	Garmin–Barracuda	+ 46"
3	Tom Danielson (USA)	Garmin–Barracuda	+ 54"
4	Tejay van Garderen (USA)	BMC Racing Team	+ 1' 17"
5	Fabio Duarte (COL)	Colombia–Coldeportes	+ 1' 36"
6	Levi Leipheimer (USA)	Omega Pharma–Quick-Step	+ 2' 13"
7	Wilco Kelderman (NED)	Rabobank	+ 2' 30"
8	Christopher Horner (USA)	RadioShack–Nissan	+ 2' 49"
9	Tiago Machado (POR)	RadioShack–Nissan	+ 2' 54"
10	Pieter Weening (NED)	Orica–GreenEDGE	+ 3' 05"

=== Stage 8 ===
May 20, 2012 — Beverly Hills to Los Angeles, 44.7 miles (71.9 km) — Flat stage

The final stage was a relatively flat affair with a modest elevation gain of 2,069 feet (631 m) over the entire course, which included 6 laps of a 5 miles (8.0 km) circuit in Los Angeles where the riders went by the Staples Center. A breakaway occurred, but it never gained more than a 35 seconds advantage over the field, since the Rabobank team dictated a fast pace to protect Robert Gesink's lead. The last escapee, Nathan Haas of Garmin–Barracuda, was caught with about 4.5 kilometres (2.8 mi) to go. The Omega Pharma–Quick-Step train took care of the pacing from that point, trying to set up a win for Tom Boonen, but to no avail: Peter Sagan of the Liquigas–Cannondale squad got the better of the massive sprint, taking his fifth win of this edition of the Tour.

The 2012 Tour of California was the last professional event in Orica–GreenEDGE's Robbie McEwen's career, as he had stated he would retire by the end of the race. He humorously said after the arrival: "This was a good race to pick as my last because I suffered so much this week I won't miss it." The overall classification winner Robert Gesink dedicated his victory to the memory of his father, who died as a result of a cycling accident in October 2010. In his own words: "I dedicate this win for my father. For me emotionally it is something really big to be back at this high level and to win a stage here, the toughest stage of all. It's a good thing to be back in California and to be winning again."

Stage 8 results

	Cyclist	Team	Time
1	Peter Sagan (SVK)	Liquigas–Cannondale	1h 27' 36"
2	Tom Boonen (BEL)	Omega Pharma–Quick-Step	s.t.
3	Gerald Ciolek (GER)	Omega Pharma–Quick-Step	s.t.
4	Roger Kluge (GER)	Argos–Shimano	s.t.
5	Heinrich Haussler (AUS)	Garmin–Barracuda	s.t.
6	Lloyd Mondory (FRA)	Ag2r–La Mondiale	s.t.
7	Ken Hanson (USA)	Optum–Kelly Benefit Strategies	s.t.
8	Daniel Oss (ITA)	Liquigas–Cannondale	s.t.
9	Michael Matthews (AUS)	Rabobank	s.t.
10	Guillaume Boivin (CAN)	SpiderTech–C10	s.t.

General Classification after Stage 8

	Cyclist	Team	Time
1	Robert Gesink (NED)	Rabobank	30h 42' 32"
2	David Zabriskie (USA)	Garmin–Barracuda	+ 46"
3	Tom Danielson (USA)	Garmin–Barracuda	+ 54"
4	Tejay van Garderen (USA)	BMC Racing Team	+ 1' 17"
5	Fabio Duarte (COL)	Colombia–Coldeportes	+ 1' 36"
6	Levi Leipheimer (USA)	Omega Pharma–Quick-Step	+ 2' 13"
7	Wilco Kelderman (NED)	Rabobank	+ 2' 30"
8	Christopher Horner (USA)	RadioShack–Nissan	+ 2' 49"
9	Tiago Machado (POR)	RadioShack–Nissan	+ 2' 54"
10	Pieter Weening (NED)	Orica–GreenEDGE	+ 3' 05"

== Classification leadership ==
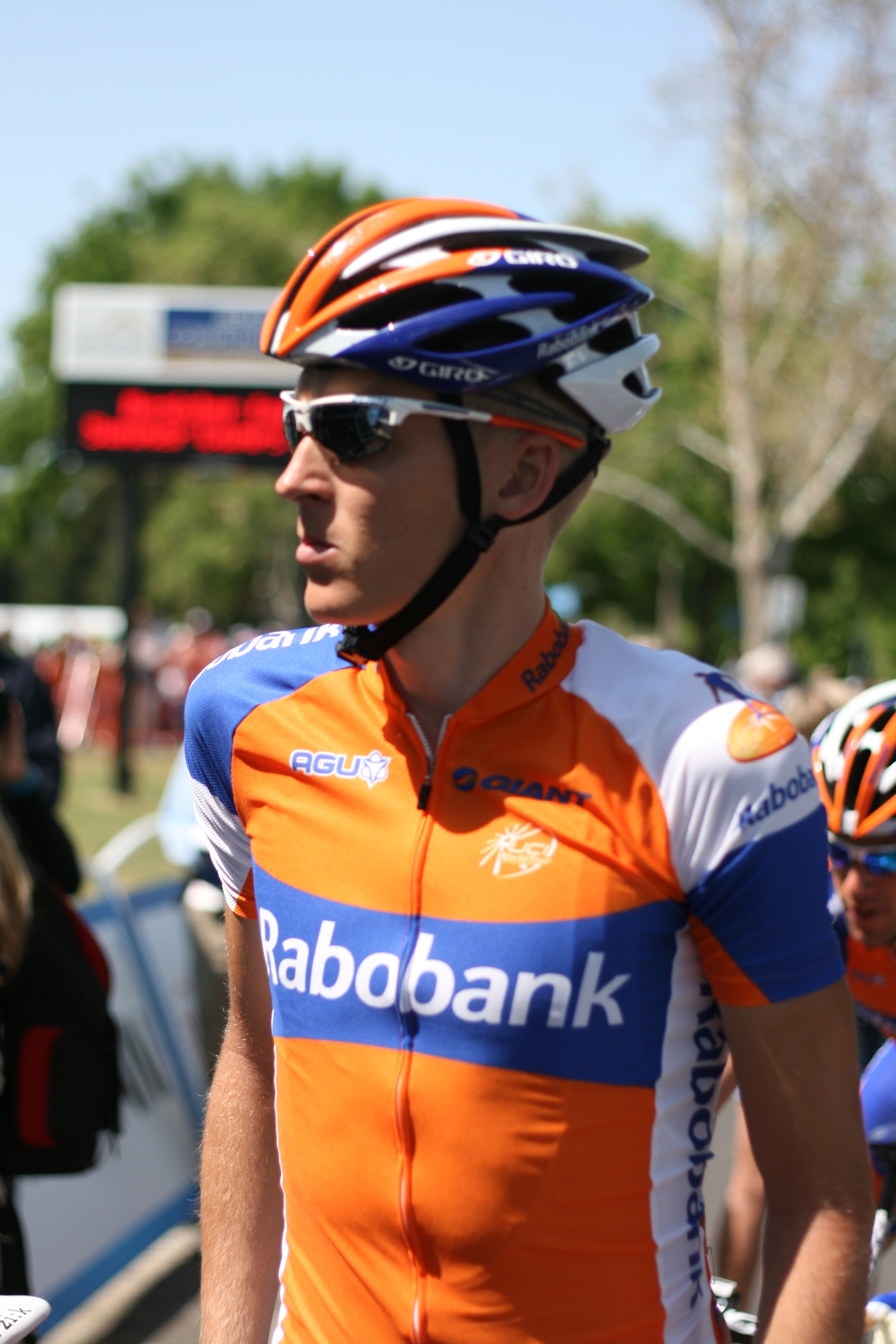
Overall classification winner Robert Gesink

In the 2012 Tour of California, six different jerseys were awarded. For the general classification, calculated by adding the finishing times of the stages per cyclist, the leader received a yellow jersey. This classification is considered the most important of the Tour of California, and the winner of the general classification was considered the winner of the Tour of California.

Additionally, there was also a sprints classification, akin to what is called the points classification in other races, which awarded a green jersey. In the sprints classification, cyclists received points for finishing in the top 10 in a stage. The winner received 15 points, second place 12, third 10, fourth 7, and one point less per place down the line, to a single point for tenth. In addition, some points could be won in intermediate sprints.

There was also a mountains classification, which awarded a red jersey. In the mountains classifications, points were won by reaching the top of a mountain before other cyclists. Each climb was categorized, either first, second, third, or fourth category, with more points available for the harder climbs.

There was also a youth classification. This classification was calculated the same way as the general classification, but only young cyclists (under 23) were included. The leader of the young rider classification received a gold and white jersey.

The other jerseys were not awarded on the basis of a time or points-based classification. A white jersey with blue trim was awarded for each stage's "Most Courageous" rider, akin to the combativity award in the Tour de France. The rider who received this award wore a blue jersey in the next stage. Unlike the Tour de France's combativity award, there was no overall award given. A black jersey for the Most Aggressive rider on each stage was also awarded, but this one was only worn on the podiums and not in competition.

There was also a classification for teams. In this classification, the times of the best three cyclists per stage were added, and the team with the lowest time was the leader.

Stage	Winner	General classification	Youth classification	Mountains classification	Sprint classification	Most courageous	Most aggressive	Team classification
1	Peter Sagan	Peter Sagan	Peter Sagan	David Boily	Peter Sagan	Levi Leipheimer	Ben Jacques-Maynes	BMC Racing Team
2	Peter Sagan	Peter Sagan	Peter Sagan	David Boily	Peter Sagan	Jeremy Vennell	Alexandre Geniez	BMC Racing Team
3	Peter Sagan	Peter Sagan	Peter Sagan	Sebastian Salas	Peter Sagan	Wilson Marentes	Jeremy Vennell	BMC Racing Team
4	Peter Sagan	Peter Sagan	Peter Sagan	Sebastian Salas	Peter Sagan	Markel Irizar	Yannick Eijssen	BMC Racing Team
5	David Zabriskie	David Zabriskie	Luke Durbridge	Sebastian Salas	Peter Sagan	not awarded	not awarded	Garmin–Barracuda
6	Sylvain Georges	David Zabriskie	Luke Durbridge	Sebastian Salas	Peter Sagan	Timothy Duggan	Sylvain Georges	Garmin–Barracuda
7	Robert Gesink	Robert Gesink	Wilco Kelderman	Sebastian Salas	Peter Sagan	Chris Horner	Darwin Atapuma	RadioShack–Nissan
8	Peter Sagan	Robert Gesink	Wilco Kelderman	Sebastian Salas	Peter Sagan	Robbie McEwen	Jeremy Vennell	RadioShack–Nissan
Final		Robert Gesink	Wilco Kelderman	Sebastian Salas	Peter Sagan	not awarded	not awarded	RadioShack–Nissan
