= 2012 Grand Prix Cycliste de Montréal =

2012 UCI World Tour, race 26 of 28

Race details
- Dates: 9 September 2011
- Stages: 1
- Distance: 205.7 km (127.8 mi)
- Winning time: 5h 28' 29"

Results
| | Winner | Lars Petter Nordhaug (Norway) | (Team Sky) |
| | Second | Moreno Moser (Italy) | (Liquigas–Cannondale) |
| | Third | Alexandr Kolobnev (Russia) | (Team Katusha) |

The 2012 Grand Prix Cycliste de Montréal was the third edition of the Grand Prix Cycliste de Montréal, a single-day professional bicycle road race. It was held on 9 September 2012, over a distance of 205.7 km (127.8 mi), starting and finishing in Montréal, Quebec, Canada. It was the 26th event of the 2012 UCI World Tour season. The race was one of the only two events which are part of the World Tour calendar in North America, the other one being the Grand Prix Cycliste de Québec contested two days prior.

The race was won by Norwegian Lars Petter Nordhaug (Team Sky), who broke away from the lead group and attacked twice inside the final 5 kilometres (3.1 mi). He out sprinted Moreno Moser (Liquigas–Cannondale) and Alexandr Kolobnev (Team Katusha). Simon Gerrans of Orica–GreenEDGE, who won the 2012 Grand Prix Cycliste de Québec, took the fourth place.

== Course ==
The race consisted of 17 laps of a circuit 12.1 km (7.5 mi) in length, and followed the same path as the 2011 edition. The circuit, around the main campus of the Université de Montréal, was well-suited for climbers and punchers with three climbs per lap. The finish was on an uphill climb with a small gradient of 4%, that was located on Avenue du Parc. There was a sharp, 180 degrees bend to the right situated 500 meters away from the line. The total vertical climb of the race was 3,893 metres. The major difficulties were:

- Kilometre 2: Côte Camilien-Houde: 1,8 kilometres, average gradient of 8%
- Kilometre 6: Côte de la Polytechnque: 780 metres, average gradient of 6% with a pass of 200 metres at 11%
- Kilometre 11: Avenue du Parc: 560 metres, average gradient of 4%

== Teams ==
As the race was held under the auspices of the UCI World Tour, all eighteen UCI ProTeams were invited automatically. There were also 3 wildcard invitations, which were UCI Professional Continental teams: two French squads (Cofidis and Team Europcar) and a Canadian one (SpiderTech–C10).

The 18 ProTeams that competed were:

- Ag2r–La Mondiale
- Astana
- BMC Racing Team
- Euskaltel–Euskadi
- FDJ–BigMat
- Garmin–Sharp
- Orica–GreenEDGE
- Team Katusha
- Lampre–ISD
- Liquigas–Cannondale
- Lotto–Belisol
- Movistar Team
- Omega Pharma–Quick-Step
- Rabobank
- RadioShack–Nissan
- Saxo Bank–Tinkoff Bank
- Team Sky
- Vacansoleil–DCM

The 3 UCI Professional Continental teams that competed were:

- Cofidis
- Team Europcar
- SpiderTech–C10

== Race summary ==
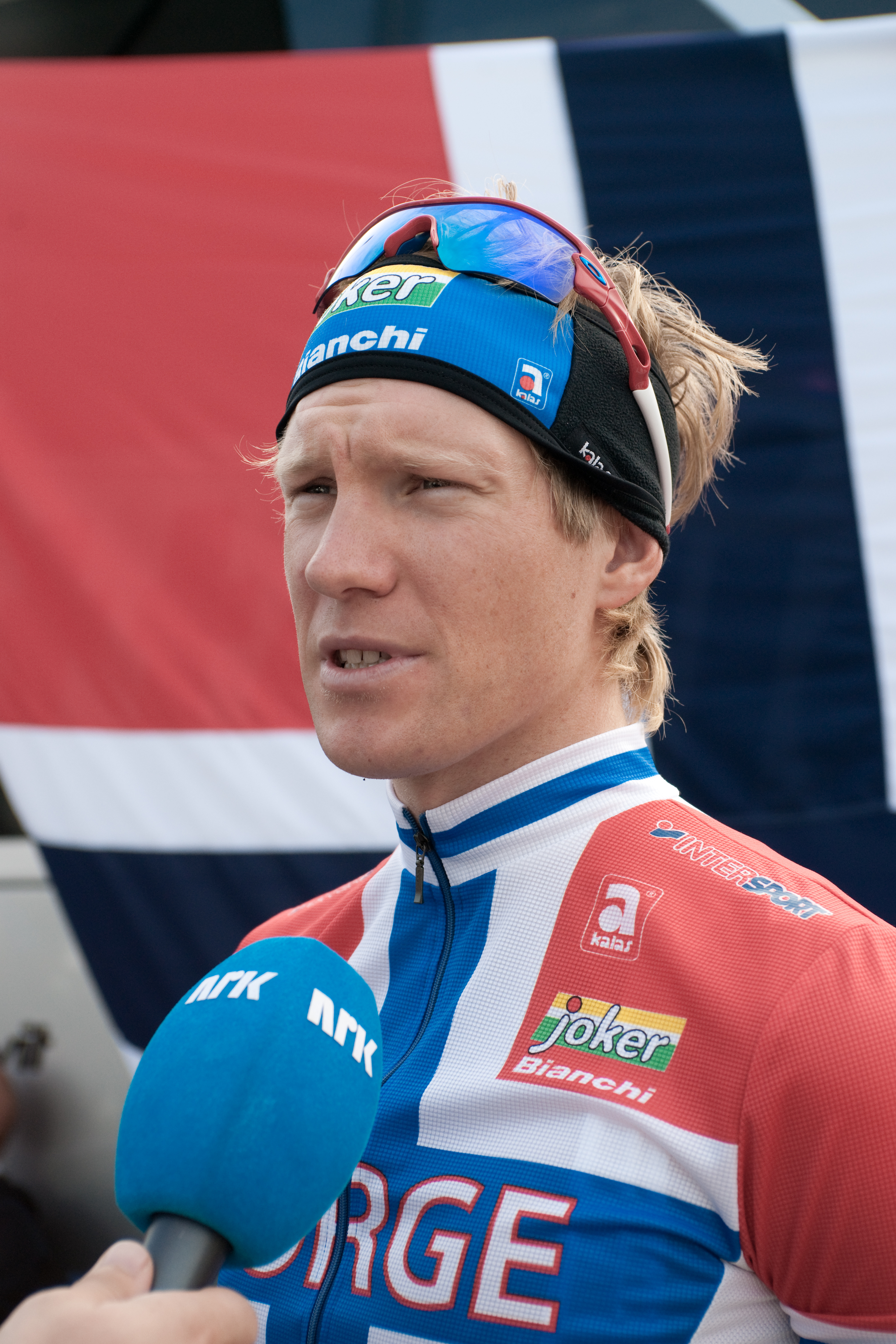
Norwegian Lars Petter Nordhaug won the event

The first significant breakaway occurred at kilometre 31, when Manuele Boaro (Saxo Bank–Tinkoff Bank) got away, soon to be joined by Cyril Gautier (Team Europcar) and Egoi Martínez (Euskaltel–Euskadi). It was the second time that Boaro tried his luck, the first attempt was annulled a little earlier. The trio cruised to a five-minute advantage, while Simone Ponzi of Astana and Kristijan Koren of Liquigas–Cannondale made an attempt to join them, and their acceleration caused a few riders to drop from the peloton. Before Koren and Ponzi could scheme something, they were brought back with 45 kilometres (28 mi) to race, as the leading group became a duet since Boaro was dropped. Martinez and Gauthier were finally caught on the Côte de la Polytechnique during the penultimate lap. Other attacks occurred, but the bunch was back together as they crossed the line to race the last lap.

On the Côte Camilien-Houde, Team Europcar's David Veilleux attacked, while Janez Brajkovič (Astana) and Gerald Ciolek (Omega Pharma–Quick-Step) collided and crashed during the climb. Canadian Ryder Hesjedal worked to bring the lead group together, which was composed of about 25 riders with 7 kilometres (4.3 mi) to go, when Greg Van Avermaet produced an acceleration that was brought back by the group. Lars Petter Nordhaug then placed an attack of his own, being screamed on by his team (Team Sky) via his earpiece to go for the victory since his teammate Edvald Boasson Hagen was out of energy.

Nordhaug was caught by Moreno Moser and Alexandr Kolobnev on the Avenue du Parc, near the flamme rouge. The pair had escaped from the group, Kolobnev produced an acceleration with 500 metres (1,600 ft) to race, his chances looked good but Nordhaug passed him to take the victory with an advantage of two seconds, with Moser taking second place and Kolobnev holding on for third. Simon Gerrans, who won the Grand Prix Cycliste de Québec 2 days before, sprinted to fourth place.

== Results ==
| | Cyclist | Team | Time | World Tour Points |
|---|---|---|---|---|
| 1 | Lars Petter Nordhaug (NOR) | Team Sky | 5h 28' 29" | 80 |
| 2 | Moreno Moser (ITA) | Liquigas–Cannondale | + 2" | 60 |
| 3 | Alexandr Kolobnev (RUS) | Team Katusha | + 2" | 50 |
| 4 | Simon Gerrans (AUS) | Orica–GreenEDGE | + 4" | 40 |
| 5 | Edvald Boasson Hagen (NOR) | Team Sky | + 4" | 30 |
| 6 | Björn Leukemans (BEL) | Vacansoleil–DCM | + 5" | 22 |
| 7 | Jürgen Roelandts (BEL) | Lotto–Belisol | + 5" | 14 |
| 8 | Rui Costa (POR) | Movistar Team | + 5" | 10 |
| 9 | Luca Paolini (ITA) | Team Katusha | + 5" | 6 |
| 10 | Tony Gallopin (FRA) | RadioShack–Nissan | + 5" | 2 |
