= David Boily =

Canadian cyclist

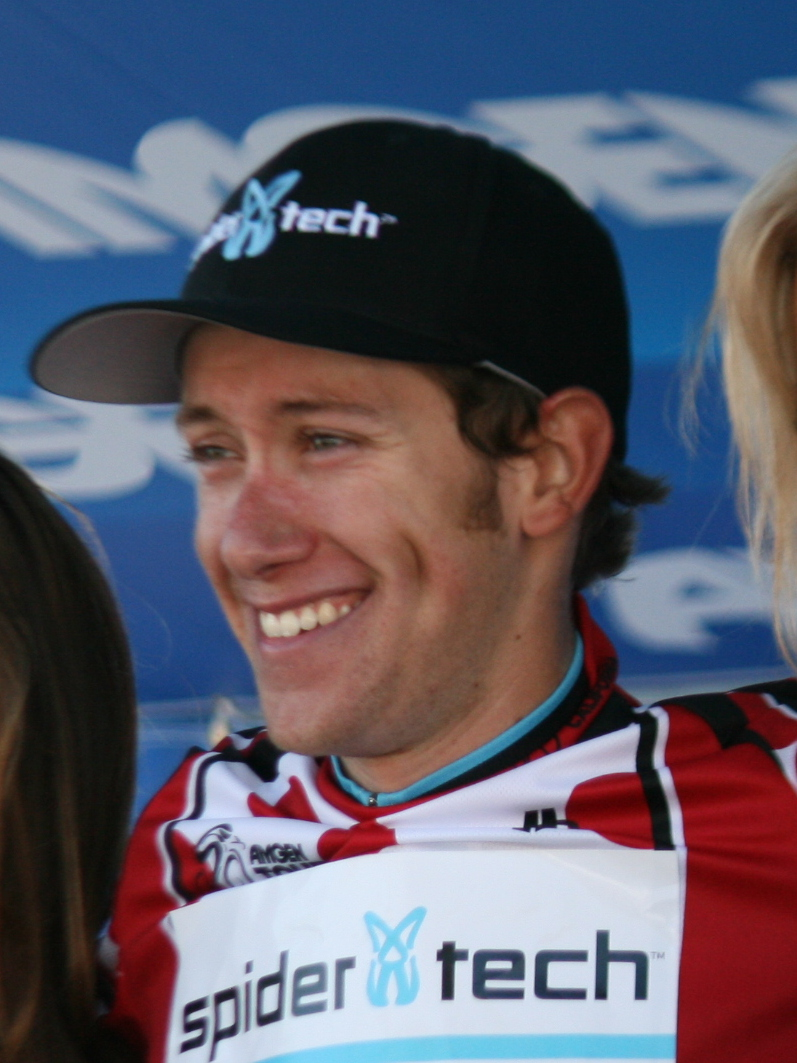
- Boily at the 2012 Tour of California

Personal information
- Full name: David Boily
- Born: April 28, 1990 (age 36) Quebec City, Quebec
- Height: 1.80 m (5 ft 11 in)
- Weight: 60 kg (130 lb)

Cycling career
- Sport: Cycling
- Current team: Retired
- Discipline: Road
- Role: Rider

Amateur team
- 2015: Stingray–Trek–Ultimate Bike

Professional teams
- 2010: SpiderTech–Planet Energy
- 2011–2012: SpiderTech–C10
- 2013: Amore & Vita
- 2016: Garneau–Québecor

David Boily (born April 28, 1990) is a Canadian former professional cyclist.

In the 2012 Tour of California, Boily held the red jersey awarded for the best climber for the first two stages before fellow Canadian Sebastian Salas (Optum–Kelly Benefit Strategies) took it from him on Stage 3. Boily stated that he was ready to fight to regain the jersey, and he did battle by raking in more points for the mountain classification, but ultimately Salas kept the lead with a total of 65 points, Boily finishing in second position with 48.

== Major results ==
2008
3rd Overall Tour de l'Abitibi
2009
3rd Criterium, Canada Games
6th Overall Univest Grand Prix
2010
9th Overall Tour de Beauce
9th Sparkassen Giro Bochum
2011
1st Mountains Classification, Giro di Sardegna
2nd Overall Tour de l'Avenir
2012
4th Overall Coupe des Nations Ville Saguenay
2016
4th Road race, National Road Championships
