= 2011 Tour of California =

UCI America Tour

Race details
- Dates: May 15–22, 2011
- Stages: 7 (Note: The Tour of California was reduced from 8 stages over 763.8 miles (1,229.2 km) due to the cancellation of Stage 1, and the shortening of Stage 2.)
- Distance: 945 km (587 mi)
- Winning time: 23h 46' 41"

Results
Jersey awarded to the overall winner	Winner	Chris Horner (United States)	(Team RadioShack)
	Second	Levi Leipheimer (United States)	(Team RadioShack)
	Third	Tom Danielson (United States)	(Garmin–Cervélo)
Jersey awarded to the mountains classification winner	Mountains	Pat McCarty (United States)	(SpiderTech–C10)
Jersey awarded to the young rider classification winner	Young rider	Tejay van Garderen (United States)	(HTC–Highroad)
Jersey awarded to the sprints classification winner	Sprints	Peter Sagan (Slovakia)	(Liquigas–Cannondale)
	Team	Garmin–Cervélo	

The 2011 Amgen Tour of California was the sixth running of the Tour of California cycling stage race. It was held from May 15–22, and was rated as a 2.HC event on the UCI America Tour. Originally scheduled for eight stages, the race was due to begin in South Lake Tahoe, but snow around the Lake Tahoe area led to stage 1 being delayed, shortened and ultimately cancelled. The race concluded in Thousand Oaks as planned.

The race was won by Team RadioShack rider Chris Horner, who claimed the leader's yellow jersey with a victory on the event's fourth stage, and held his advantage to the end of the race. Horner's winning margin over teammate and runner-up Levi Leipheimer was 38 seconds, and Garmin–Cervélo's Tom Danielson completed the podium, 2 minutes and 7 seconds behind Leipheimer and 2 minutes and 45 seconds behind Horner. The comfortable margin that Horner and Leipheimer had over the field was due in part from a 1–2 performance on the event's queen stage where they finished over 40 seconds clear of the next placed rider.

In the race's other classifications, SpiderTech–C10 rider Pat McCarty won the King of the Mountains classification, Peter Sagan of Liquigas–Cannondale won the green jersey for the sprints classification, HTC–Highroad's Tejay van Garderen won the young rider classification, with Garmin–Cervélo finishing at the head of the teams classification.

There were no blood doping tests during the race.

== Participating teams ==
Nineteen teams were due to participate in the Tour of California, but the Movistar Continental Team declined the invitation from organizers, leaving 18 teams to start. These included nine UCI ProTeams, four UCI Professional Continental teams, and five UCI Continental teams. Fourteen of those teams had participated in the 2010 Tour of California. Each team was allowed to begin with 8 riders, and thus the race began with 144 riders. The teams were:

UCI ProTeams

- BMC Racing Team *
- Garmin–Cervélo *
- HTC–Highroad *
- Leopard Trek
- Liquigas–Cannondale *
- Rabobank *
- Saxo Bank–SunGard *
- Team RadioShack *
- Team Sky

UCI Professional Continental Teams

- SpiderTech–C10 *
- Team NetApp
- Team Type 1–Sanofi Aventis *
- UnitedHealthcare *

(* – participated in 2010)

UCI Continental Teams

- Bissell *
- Jamis–Sutter Home *
- Jelly Belly–Kenda *
- Kelly Benefit Strategies–OptumHealth *
- Kenda–5-hour Energy

The Movistar Continental Team, from Colombia, later leaked that it had turned the invitation down because Tour organizers had refused to cover its airfare to attend, which the organizers do for ProTeams. In response, Tour organizer AEG Sports noted that it was required under UCI rules only to cover lodging and meal costs for professional teams at the race and agreed to cover airfare costs for ProTeams only because "[t]heir attendance is vital to the success of the race."

For the second straight year, the race conflicted with the Giro d'Italia, which caused a number of top cyclists to miss the race, while other Tour de France contenders continued to view California, along with either the Tour of Switzerland or the Critérium du Dauphiné (both in June), as better preparation for the July race. Nevertheless, the starting field included almost all of the American stars, such as three-time champion Levi Leipheimer of Team RadioShack, his teammate Chris Horner, three-time runner-up David Zabriskie of Garmin–Cervélo, and his teammate Christian Vande Velde. Several rising American stars also started the event, such as Brent Bookwalter and Taylor Phinney of BMC Racing Team – joining George Hincapie in the team – and Tejay van Garderen of HTC–Highroad.

International riders like Tour de France runner-up Andy Schleck also entered the event, with the new-for-2011 Leopard Trek outfit. Leopard Trek's commitment to the race came despite the team's departure from the Giro d'Italia after the death of Wouter Weylandt days before the Tour of California commenced. Other top international riders included Rabobank's Laurens ten Dam, Garmin–Cervélo's Ryder Hesjedal, and Rory Sutherland of UnitedHealthcare.

== Stages ==
=== Stage 1 ===
May 15, 2011 — South Lake Tahoe to North Lake Tahoe, 118.7 miles (191.0 km)

After last year's opening stage which was suited to the out-and-out sprinters, the first stage of the 2011 Tour was expected to be a high-altitude road race stage in the Sierra Mountains around Lake Tahoe, not dipping below 6,200 feet (1,900 m) and peaking over 7,000 feet (2,100 m) with the categorized climbs of Spooner Junction and Brockway Summit. Two climbs of Emerald Bay were also included in the route along with sprints in Tahoe City and back at South Lake Tahoe after passing back into California from Nevada; the first time that the Tour had ventured outside of its home state.

However, the weather ultimately decided the fate of the stage, after forecasts in the week running up to the stage called for a large snowstorm to hit Lake Tahoe on the day of the stage. The forecast came to fruition on race day, and with contingency plans in place, the stage was delayed and reduced from its original 118.7 miles (191.0 km) distance to 47.74 miles (76.83 km). Minutes prior to the stage start, it was cancelled due to the riders refusing to ride in poor weather conditions. Team RadioShack's Levi Leipheimer stated that the riders did not feel comfortable riding in such conditions, citing the death of Leopard Trek rider Wouter Weylandt on the third stage of the Giro d'Italia as a factor in their decision.

=== Stage 2 ===
May 16, 2011 — Nevada City to Sacramento, 76.3 miles (122.8 km)

Stage 2 was scheduled to begin at the Squaw Valley Ski Resort, go over the 7,000 feet (2,100 m) peak of the Donner Pass, and then descend to the California State Capitol building in Sacramento on largely the same route as the opening stage of the 2010 Tour, which resulted in a sprint for victory, won by Team HTC–Columbia's Mark Cavendish. Just like last year, the expectation was for the race to finish in a sprint for the line. However, as a result of the continuing snowy conditions around Lake Tahoe, the organizers moved the start of the stage to Nevada City, where last year's Tour began. That reduced the length of the stage to 76.3 miles (122.8 km) from 133.2 miles (214.4 km), and moved the start back two hours, from 10:15 a.m. PDT to 12:15 p.m. PDT. As well as the reduction of the overall stage length, two laps of the circuit in Sacramento were added to the one that was already scheduled. With the stage being revised, only the stage finish carried points towards the points classification as well as time bonuses towards the general classification.

Three riders established the early breakaway; Jamey Driscoll of Jamis–Sutter Home, Timon Seubert of Team NetApp and László Bodrogi of Team Type 1–Sanofi Aventis were later joined by Bissell's Ben Jacques-Maynes as they extended their margin to peloton to over five minutes at one point. However, their advantage was steadily cut after that, and the quartet were eventually caught as the field entered the outskirts of Sacramento, Jacques-Maynes the last to hold off the pack with around 8 miles (13 km) to the finish. HTC–Highroad and Saxo Bank–SunGard headed the field as they entered the short finishing circuit, but with rain starting to fall, Team Sky came to the front to assume control for Ben Swift. Swift was favored instead of the team's regular sprinter Greg Henderson, who had not raced since the Scheldeprijs in early April, but Henderson was utilized as the leadout man for Swift, and released him to his fifth victory of 2011, securing the first yellow and green jerseys of the race. Liquigas–Cannondale also pushed towards the front during the final circuit in a bid to push Peter Sagan up the order for the run to the line, and Sagan ended the sprint second with Goss third for HTC–Highroad, after mistiming his sprint. Sagan took the white jersey as the best placed under-23 rider, while Driscoll was named the most courageous rider of the day.

Stage 2 Result

	Rider	Team	Time
1	Ben Swift (GBR)	Team Sky	2h 47' 12"
2	Peter Sagan (SVK)	Liquigas–Cannondale	s.t.
3	Matthew Goss (AUS)	HTC–Highroad	s.t.
4	Keven Lacombe (CAN)	SpiderTech–C10	s.t.
5	Juan José Haedo (ARG)	Saxo Bank–SunGard	s.t.
6	Alejandro Borrajo (ARG)	Jamis–Sutter Home	s.t.
7	Thor Hushovd (NOR)	Garmin–Cervélo	s.t.
8	Taylor Phinney (USA)	BMC Racing Team	s.t.
9	Óscar Freire (ESP)	Rabobank	s.t.
10	Shawn Milne (USA)	Kenda–5-hour Energy	s.t.

General Classification after Stage 2

	Rider	Team	Time
1	Ben Swift (GBR)	Team Sky	2h 47' 02"
2	Peter Sagan (SVK)	Liquigas–Cannondale	+ 4"
3	Matthew Goss (AUS)	HTC–Highroad	+ 6"
4	Keven Lacombe (CAN)	SpiderTech–C10	+ 10"
5	Juan José Haedo (ARG)	Saxo Bank–SunGard	+ 10"
6	Alejandro Borrajo (ARG)	Jamis–Sutter Home	+ 10"
7	Thor Hushovd (NOR)	Garmin–Cervélo	+ 10"
8	Taylor Phinney (USA)	BMC Racing Team	+ 10"
9	Óscar Freire (ESP)	Rabobank	+ 10"
10	Shawn Milne (USA)	Kenda–5-hour Energy	+ 10"

=== Stage 3 ===
May 17, 2011 — Auburn to Modesto, 121.9 miles (196.2 km)

With no King of the Mountains passes scheduled for the stage despite its slightly undulating nature – descending from 1,400 feet (430 m) to just above sea level, via a few hills along the way – the expectation was for the sprinters to prevail on the day, as Francesco Chicchi had done so in 2010 when the fourth stage ended in Modesto. Although believing that a sprint finish was the most likely occurrence, Team RadioShack's Chris Horner stated that the stage could be the first opportunity for a breakaway to succeed in Modesto, and that cross winds could also factor into the day's conditions and could split the field.

As he had done the previous day, Jamis–Sutter Home rider Jamey Driscoll made the breakaway along with six other riders mainly representing American-registered teams, with the exception of Jan Bárta of Team NetApp as they quickly formed an advantage within the first minutes of the stage. The breakaway claimed all the intermediate sprints as their advantage extended up to a maximum of 6' 40". With 13 miles (21 km), the cross winds that Horner had mentioned occurred, with pressure on the front Team Sky, they broke the field into echelons for a time. The acceleration caught out many riders, including the likes of Garmin–Cervélo's Thor Hushovd and Leopard Trek's Andy Schleck, but both rejoined when the wind turned to their advantage. Horner himself had trouble towards the end of the stage, after a coming together with Liquigas–Cannondale sprinter Peter Sagan, which formed him to complete the stage on his teammate Markel Irizar's bike after a bike change, but finished with the main field.

As the race headed into Modesto, HTC–Highroad and Liquigas–Cannondale took turns at the front in the hope of preventing a late-race attack, and to help with the eventually sprint for the line after two circuits. Once on the circuit, SpiderTech–C10 then upped their pace for their sprinter Keven Lacombe, who had finished fourth in Sacramento. In the bunch, Jens Voigt, Will Dugan and Andreas Schillinger fell but all remounted and completed the stage. Saxo Bank–SunGard and Team Sky moved up to the front, with the latter gaining a similar team position as what had occurred the previous day. As the field moved inside the final kilometer, Saxo Bank–SunGard lost a man from the front after Baden Cooke fell, with fellow Australians Michael Matthews of Rabobank and Matthew Goss of HTC–Highroad also falling. At the front, Greg Henderson led the sprint out, but Ben Swift was not in a position to challenge for the sprint, so it was left to Henderson to bring home the laurels for Team Sky, winning the sprint by a bike length. Saxo Bank–SunGard's Juan José Haedo finished second ahead of Hushovd, Sagan and Goss' teammate Leigh Howard. With their respective stage wins and time bonuses, Henderson and Swift were left tied on the same time, and with the same stage finishes – a win and an eleventh place – Henderson was given the yellow jersey on countback as the most recent stage winner. Sagan assumed the green jersey from Swift with his second top-five stage finish, to go with his white jersey, while Barta claimed the most courageous rider of the day honors.

Stage 3 Result

	Rider	Team	Time
1	Greg Henderson (NZL)	Team Sky	5h 14' 29"
2	Juan José Haedo (ARG)	Saxo Bank–SunGard	s.t.
3	Thor Hushovd (NOR)	Garmin–Cervélo	s.t.
4	Peter Sagan (SVK)	Liquigas–Cannondale	s.t.
5	Leigh Howard (AUS)	HTC–Highroad	s.t.
6	Keven Lacombe (CAN)	SpiderTech–C10	s.t.
7	Robert Förster (GER)	UnitedHealthcare	s.t.
8	Taylor Phinney (USA)	BMC Racing Team	s.t.
9	Jure Kocjan (SLO)	Team Type 1–Sanofi Aventis	s.t.
10	Alex Candelario (USA)	Kelly Benefit Strategies–OptumHealth	s.t.

General Classification after Stage 3

	Rider	Team	Time
1	Greg Henderson (NZL)	Team Sky	8h 01' 31"
2	Ben Swift (GBR)	Team Sky	+ 0"
3	Peter Sagan (SVK)	Liquigas–Cannondale	+ 4"
4	Juan José Haedo (ARG)	Saxo Bank–SunGard	+ 4"
5	Thor Hushovd (NOR)	Garmin–Cervélo	+ 6"
6	Matthew Goss (AUS)	HTC–Highroad	+ 6"
7	Keven Lacombe (CAN)	SpiderTech–C10	+ 10"
8	Taylor Phinney (USA)	BMC Racing Team	+ 10"
9	Robert Förster (GER)	UnitedHealthcare	+ 10"
10	Alex Candelario (USA)	Kelly Benefit Strategies–OptumHealth	+ 10"

=== Stage 4 ===
May 18, 2011 — Livermore to San Jose, 81.8 miles (131.6 km)

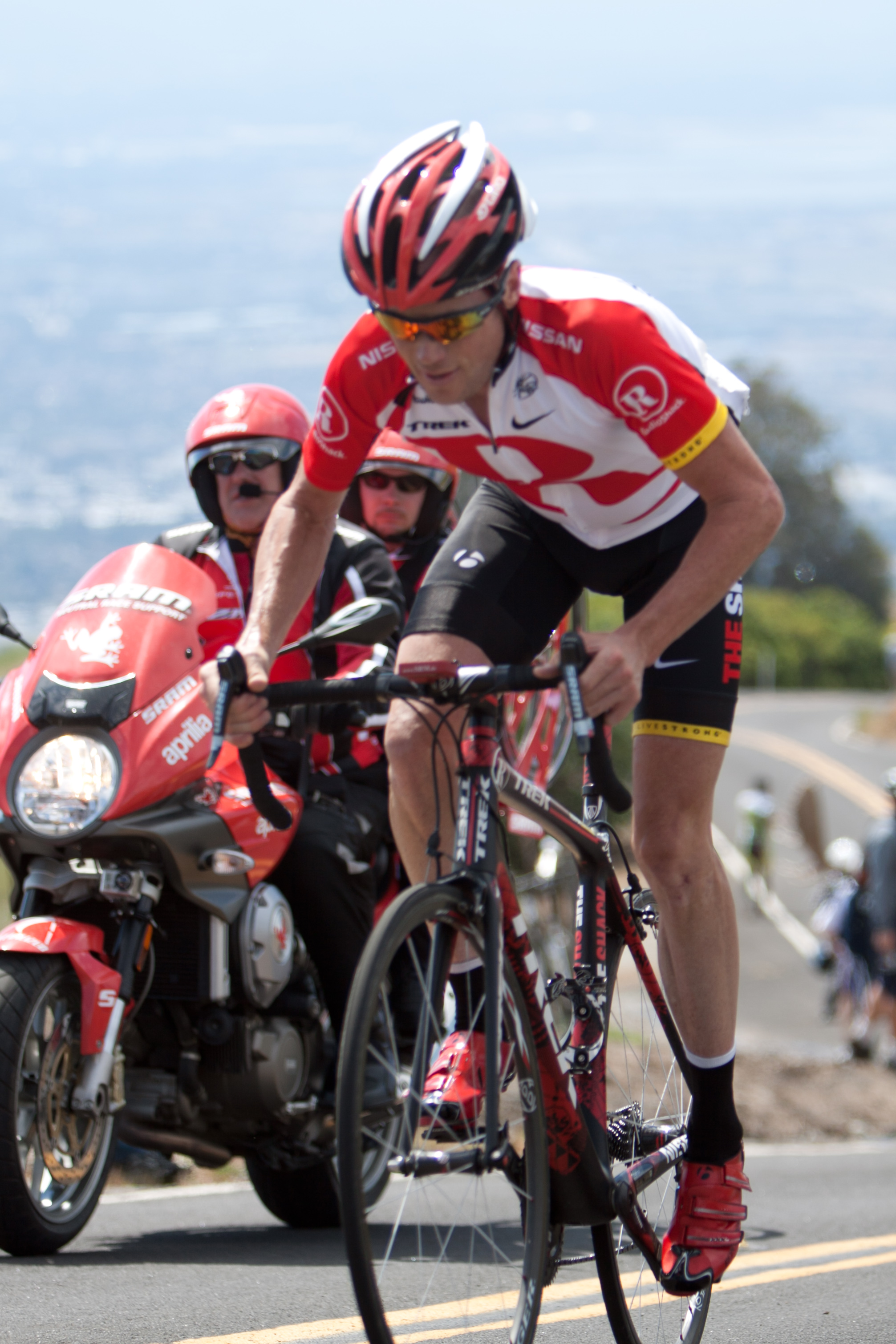
Chris Horner riding solo on the stage's final climb, the ascent of Sierra Road. His victory by over a minute helped him to take the yellow jersey as the leader of the general classification.

After two sprinter-friendly stages, the fourth stage culminated in the Tour's first mountain-top finish. With five King of the Mountains passes packed into the stage's 81.8 miles (131.6 km) distance, the expectation for the stage was for the riders with strengths in the mountains as well as the general classification contenders to do battle for stage victory. Three of the climbs occurred on the San Antonio Valley Road, including the hors catégorie Mount Hamilton, before the finish on the Sierra Road.

A ten-man breakaway formed as the race was leaving Livermore, again composed mainly of the domestic teams but three riders from the World Tour teams – Martin Pedersen representing Leopard Trek, Lars Boom of Rabobank and Garmin–Cervélo's Thor Hushovd – also made it into the breakaway, extending an advantage of three minutes before the first climb on Mines Road. Boom took maximum points on the climb, as the breakaway swamped up the points for Mines Road, as well as the next two prior to Mount Hamilton, when the breakaway dwindled with Bissell rider Patrick Vennell being the last of the escapees to be caught, midway up Mount Hamilton. SpiderTech–C10's Pat McCarty managed to best a quartet of Team RadioShack riders to secure maximum points on the climb, before dropping back into the pack and it was left to Team RadioShack to pace it on the descent. On the descent, Hushovd's teammate Ryder Hesjedal attacked and made headway from the group and was later joined by Rabobank's Paul Martens as they put almost a minute on the pack before Martens overshot a corner and lost time to Hesjedal, who in turn waited for his return prior to the final climb up Sierra Road.

Hesjedal again attacked at the bottom of the climb and this time, Martens could not keep his pace and was swamped up by the group. Team RadioShack duo Levi Leipheimer and Chris Horner upped their pace in the chasers, and soon went off in pursuit of Hesjedal, catching him with 2 miles (3.2 km) remaining on the climb, but Horner accelerated once again, leaving Leipheimer and Hesjedal behind. A four-man group – Tom Danielson of Garmin–Cervélo, Andy Schleck of Leopard Trek, HTC–Highroad's Tejay van Garderen as well as UnitedHealthcare's Rory Sutherland – then pulled up to the duo ahead and they would contest for the minor placings, with the exception of van Garderen, who was overhauled by five more riders in the closing stages. Horner soloed to his first Tour of California stage victory, and with previous jersey holder Greg Henderson losing over fifteen minutes to Horner, the yellow jersey to go with it. Schleck bested Sutherland and Leipheimer for second place on the stage, with Danielson seven seconds in arrears in fifth. McCarty took the first red jersey for the mountains classification on countback from Leipheimer, Peter Sagan remained the wearer of the green jersey as there were no sprint points on offer in the stage, Andrew Talansky took the young rider classification lead from Sagan, and Hesjedal was given the most courageous rider honors.

Stage 4 Result

	Rider	Team	Time
1	Chris Horner (USA)	Team RadioShack	3h 27' 51"
2	Andy Schleck (LUX)	Leopard Trek	+ 1' 15"
3	Rory Sutherland (AUS)	UnitedHealthcare	+ 1' 15"
4	Levi Leipheimer (USA)	Team RadioShack	+ 1' 15"
5	Tom Danielson (USA)	Garmin–Cervélo	+ 1' 22"
6	Christian Vande Velde (USA)	Garmin–Cervélo	+ 1' 29"
7	Ryder Hesjedal (CAN)	Garmin–Cervélo	+ 1' 36"
8	Laurens ten Dam (NED)	Rabobank	+ 1' 45"
9	Andrew Talansky (USA)	Garmin–Cervélo	+ 1' 50"
10	Linus Gerdemann (GER)	Leopard Trek	+ 1' 50"

General Classification after Stage 4

	Rider	Team	Time
1	Chris Horner (USA)	Team RadioShack	11h 29' 32"
2	Levi Leipheimer (USA)	Team RadioShack	+ 1' 15"
3	Tom Danielson (USA)	Garmin–Cervélo	+ 1' 22"
4	Christian Vande Velde (USA)	Garmin–Cervélo	+ 1' 29"
5	Rory Sutherland (AUS)	UnitedHealthcare	+ 1' 30"
6	Andy Schleck (LUX)	Leopard Trek	+ 1' 30"
7	Ryder Hesjedal (CAN)	Garmin–Cervélo	+ 1' 36"
8	Linus Gerdemann (GER)	Leopard Trek	+ 1' 50"
9	Andrew Talansky (USA)	Garmin–Cervélo	+ 1' 50"
10	Laurens ten Dam (NED)	Rabobank	+ 2' 00"

=== Stage 5 ===
May 19, 2011 — Seaside to Paso Robles, 135.1 miles (217.4 km)

Late winter storms forced tour organizers to reroute the stage, and as such, the stage utilized the majority of the route used on the fourth stage of the 2008 Tour. On that day, the race also began in Seaside before heading to the stage finish in San Luis Obispo where the stage was won by Dominique Rollin after soloing from 12.5 miles (20.1 km) out. A hilly stage with four categorized climbs and two intermediary sprints, expectations were for a breakaway to succeed or for a large group to contest a sprint for victory.

After an early break by four riders consisting of Rabobank's Óscar Freire, Team Sky's Chris Froome, Dan Martin of Garmin–Cervélo as well as the customary member of a domestic team, with Bissell rider Chris Baldwin being their representative in the early breakaway. Another seven riders later joined the group to create an 11-man move that eventually extended their advantage in excess of three minutes. Again, the King of the Mountains points were taken by the breakaway, with Pat McCarty of SpiderTech–C10 extending his lead prior to Saturday's stage on Mount Baldy as no points were on offer during the individual time trial in Solvang. At the top of the final climb, Freire and Leopard Trek's Stefan Denifl attacked from the break and managed to put a gap on them of around 30 seconds. The duo remained together until around 10 miles (16 km) to go, when Denifl punctured and crashed, and it was left to Freire to bid for victory on his own.

The remnants of the breakaway were caught 6.5 miles (10.5 km) outside Paso Robles, while Freire remained well over a minute clear of the pack. This gap steadily came down with many teams pushing the pace up to help advance their sprinters, including Liquigas–Cannondale and HTC–Highroad for Peter Sagan, Leigh Howard and Matthew Goss respectively. The high pace of the peloton meant that when Freire was caught with 1.5 miles (2.4 km) to go, the field split into several groups. Freire was given most courageous rider of the day for his exploits. Bissell's Jeremy Vennell then attacked but was caught within the final kilometer. Team Sky then placed themselves on the front with Mathew Hayman and Greg Henderson looking to lead out Ben Swift, but Howard gained an advantage on them before Sagan usurped them both to claim his third Tour win, after two in 2010. Howard bested Swift for second place, as only 45 of the 133 riders that finished the stage were given Sagan's time for the stage. Chris Horner retained the yellow jersey ahead of Solvang, Sagan remained in green, while Andrew Talansky dropped enough time during the stage to lose the white jersey lead to HTC–Highroad rider Tejay van Garderen.

Stage 5 Result

	Rider	Team	Time
1	Peter Sagan (SVK)	Liquigas–Cannondale	5h 16' 03"
2	Leigh Howard (AUS)	HTC–Highroad	s.t.
3	Ben Swift (GBR)	Team Sky	s.t.
4	Paul Martens (GER)	Rabobank	s.t.
5	Alex Candelario (USA)	Kelly Benefit Strategies–OptumHealth	s.t.
6	Jonas Aaen Jørgensen (DEN)	Saxo Bank–SunGard	s.t.
7	Coen Vermeltfoort (NED)	Rabobank	s.t.
8	Taylor Phinney (USA)	BMC Racing Team	s.t.
9	Frank Pipp (USA)	Bissell	s.t.
10	Alexander Gottfried (GER)	Team NetApp	s.t.

General Classification after Stage 5

	Rider	Team	Time
1	Chris Horner (USA)	Team RadioShack	16h 45' 35"
2	Levi Leipheimer (USA)	Team RadioShack	+ 1' 15"
3	Tom Danielson (USA)	Garmin–Cervélo	+ 1' 22"
4	Christian Vande Velde (USA)	Garmin–Cervélo	+ 1' 29"
5	Rory Sutherland (AUS)	UnitedHealthcare	+ 1' 30"
6	Andy Schleck (LUX)	Leopard Trek	+ 1' 30"
7	Ryder Hesjedal (CAN)	Garmin–Cervélo	+ 1' 36"
8	Linus Gerdemann (GER)	Leopard Trek	+ 1' 50"
9	Laurens ten Dam (NED)	Rabobank	+ 2' 00"
10	Tejay van Garderen (USA)	HTC–Highroad	+ 2' 05"

=== Stage 6 ===
May 20, 2011 — Solvang, 15 miles (24 km) (individual time trial) (ITT)

The Solvang time trial returned to the Tour for its 2011 edition, after the trial was held in downtown Los Angeles in 2010. Levi Leipheimer was tipped by Team RadioShack teammate Chris Horner to be the favorite for the stage, having won in Solvang in each of the three occasions that it has featured on the Tour, en route to an overall victory each time. Another name mentioned by Horner as a rider who could challenge Leipheimer was Garmin–Cervélo's David Zabriskie, who won a time trial three weeks prior to the Tour, during the Tour de Romandie.

The early pace was set by William Dickeson of Jelly Belly–Kenda, who went round the course in 32' 53", but was usurped by his teammate Bernard van Ulden by half a minute. Rabobank's Lars Boom had been quicker than van Ulden at the intermediate split but lost time over the second half of the course. Ian Stannard of Team Sky was the next rider to top the timesheets, setting a time of 32' 07", as the team looked for their third win of the Tour. Stannard held his lead for over half an hour, as he fended off American national time trial champion Taylor Phinney of BMC Racing Team, before losing his lead to a former national time trial champion, the New Zealand rider from Bissell, Jeremy Vennell. Vennell recorded a time of 31' 34", which was eventually good enough to remain inside the top ten. His lead was short-lived as Rabobank took the lead with rider Maarten Tjallingii, who set a time ten seconds quicker.

Tjallingii's time held to inside the last 40 riders, when Peter Velits (HTC–Highroad) trimmed a solitary second off his time and moved into the top spot for the time being, but Garmin–Cervélo's David Zabriskie rewrote the Solvang record books, recording a time of 30' 35" which was good enough to give him the stage win. Youth classification leader Tejay van Garderen, a former top-5 placer on two time trial stages at the 2010 Critérium du Dauphiné, got closest to Zabriskie for a time, but was still some 40 seconds in arrear of his fellow American. This performance was enough to give him the honors for the most courageous rider of the day. Stage favorite Leipheimer managed to record a quicker split time than Zabriskie, but like many other riders, fell away during the second part of the stage and fell 14 seconds down on him but was good enough for second on the stage. Horner maintained his general classification lead with a sixth-place finish on the stage, losing around half of his lead, but still holding an advantage of 38 seconds.

Stage 6 Result

	Rider	Team	Time
1	David Zabriskie (USA)	Garmin–Cervélo	30' 35"
2	Levi Leipheimer (USA)	Team RadioShack	+ 14"
3	Tejay van Garderen (USA)	HTC–Highroad	+ 40"
4	Peter Velits (SVK)	HTC–Highroad	+ 48"
5	Maarten Tjallingii (NED)	Rabobank	+ 49"
6	Chris Horner (USA)	Team RadioShack	+ 51"
7	Jakob Fuglsang (DEN)	Leopard Trek	+ 53"
8	Jeremy Vennell (NZL)	Bissell	+ 59"
9	Rory Sutherland (AUS)	UnitedHealthcare	+ 59"
10	Christian Vande Velde (USA)	Garmin–Cervélo	+ 1' 01"

General Classification after Stage 6

	Rider	Team	Time
1	Chris Horner (USA)	Team RadioShack	17h 17' 01"
2	Levi Leipheimer (USA)	Team RadioShack	+ 38"
3	Rory Sutherland (AUS)	UnitedHealthcare	+ 1' 38"
4	Christian Vande Velde (USA)	Garmin–Cervélo	+ 1' 39"
5	Tom Danielson (USA)	Garmin–Cervélo	+ 1' 44"
6	Tejay van Garderen (USA)	HTC–Highroad	+ 1' 54"
7	Linus Gerdemann (GER)	Leopard Trek	+ 2' 26"
8	Ryder Hesjedal (CAN)	Garmin–Cervélo	+ 2' 27"
9	Laurens ten Dam (NED)	Rabobank	+ 2' 43"
10	Andy Schleck (LUX)	Leopard Trek	+ 2' 54"

=== Stage 7 ===
May 21, 2011 — Claremont to Mount Baldy, 74.9 mi (120.5 km)

The queen stage of the 2011 Tour saw the riders presented with three climbs in excess of 3,000 feet (910 m), as well as an intermediate sprint in Glendora. The first climb of the day, the Glendora Ridge Road, comes after 11.5 miles (18.5 km), having negotiated a climb of a mile in length. After the sprint in Glendora, the riders will then negotiate the Glendora Mountain Road climb, a distance of 8.5 miles (13.7 km) being used in full for the first time since 2004. After a gradual uphill climb, the riders hit the slopes of Mount Baldy. 3.5 miles (5.6 km) at a gradient of 8.9% could decide the general classification for one rider at the Tour's first high-mountain finish.

Early breakaways formed within the first 6 miles (9.7 km) of the stage, with up to nine riders advancing ahead of the main field at any one point, including former general classification leader Ben Swift of Team Sky and mountains leader Pat McCarty of SpiderTech–C10. After Swift departed back from the break, Garmin–Cervélo brought one of their top-ten overall riders into the break, Ryder Hesjedal, to join Andrew Talansky in order to pressurize Team RadioShack who were still in the main pack. McCarty took maximum points on both Glendora Ridge Road and Glendora Mountain Road, to mathematically ensure he would win the mountains classification by reaching the finish in Thousand Oaks, but was dropped by the break who had never been able to get far enough of the pack, the gap keeping around two minutes.

The pack itself had dwindled to around 20 riders prior to the hors catégorie climb of Mount Baldy, with Team RadioShack still on the front with Matthew Busche and Ben King pacing the field in the hopes of advancing Chris Horner and Levi Leipheimer up the climb and after the break. Andy Schleck and Laurens ten Dam followed closely in the wheels of their rivals, as the quintet looked to close down the gap to Talansky, Liquigas–Cannondale's Francesco Bellotti and Team Novo Nordisk's Alexander Efimkin, which was now under a minute. With 2 miles (3.2 km) to go, Busche attacked and only Leipheimer and Horner could advance with him and when their leadout man pulled off, they set off after the leading trio and swamped them up inside the final 1.5 miles (2.4 km). Horner and Leipheimer rode together for the remainder of the climb and finished hand-in-hand with Horner giving Leipheimer the stage win, his first road stage victory in the Tour. Ten Dam was third, 43 seconds behind the American duo, as he moved into sixth in the general classification, while Garmin-Cervélo's Tom Danielson moved into third place overall after a fourth-place stage finish.

Stage 7 Result

	Rider	Team	Time
1	Levi Leipheimer (USA)	Team RadioShack	3h 33' 01"
2	Chris Horner (USA)	Team RadioShack	s.t.
3	Laurens ten Dam (NED)	Rabobank	+ 43"
4	Tom Danielson (USA)	Garmin–Cervélo	+ 1' 01"
5	Steve Morabito (SUI)	BMC Racing Team	+ 1' 21"
6	Alexander Efimkin (RUS)	Team Type 1–Sanofi Aventis	+ 1' 21"
7	Tejay van Garderen (USA)	HTC–Highroad	+ 1' 29"
8	Damiano Caruso (ITA)	Liquigas–Cannondale	+ 1' 39"
9	Andy Schleck (LUX)	Leopard Trek	+ 1' 39"
10	Christian Vande Velde (USA)	Garmin–Cervélo	+ 1' 39"

General Classification after Stage 7

	Rider	Team	Time
1	Chris Horner (USA)	Team RadioShack	20h 50' 02"
2	Levi Leipheimer (USA)	Team RadioShack	+ 38"
3	Tom Danielson (USA)	Garmin–Cervélo	+ 2' 45"
4	Christian Vande Velde (USA)	Garmin–Cervélo	+ 3' 18"
5	Tejay van Garderen (USA)	HTC–Highroad	+ 3' 23"
6	Laurens ten Dam (NED)	Rabobank	+ 3' 26"
7	Rory Sutherland (AUS)	UnitedHealthcare	+ 4' 12"
8	Andy Schleck (LUX)	Leopard Trek	+ 4' 33"
9	Steve Morabito (SUI)	BMC Racing Team	+ 4' 50"
10	Ryder Hesjedal (CAN)	Garmin–Cervélo	+ 6' 16"

=== Stage 8 ===
May 22, 2011 — Santa Clarita to Thousand Oaks, 82.3 miles (132.4 km)

Rather than an out-and-out circuit race to finish the event as what occurred in 2010, the final stage of the Tour saw a gradual descent from the start in Santa Clarita, before the final classified climb of the event at Balcom Canyon. Prior to the finishing circuit in Thousand Oaks, riders also had to navigate the Norwegian Grade climb, after the Moorpark sprint. Once in the finishing circuit, the riders completed five full laps of around 5 miles (8.0 km) in length. Expectations were for either the sprinters to take victory, or a breakaway to succeed but not to an extent to adjust the final overall classification.

Just like many of the other stages, the American domestic teams had a great presence within the early breakaways which resulted in four riders – Bradley White of UnitedHealthcare, Jan Bárta of Team NetApp, José Fernando Antogna of Jamis–Sutter Home and Mike Friedman of Kelly Benefit Strategies–OptumHealth – heading clear after around 20 miles (32 km). The breakaway extended out to a maximum of three minutes, and took a clean sweep of the points at the Balcom Canyon climb and the two intermediate sprints in Moorpark and the first pass through the finish line prior to the completion of the five circuits to end the race. The gap to the four leaders slowly dwindled, and with 18 miles (29 km) to go, Rabobank's Maarten Tjallingii and Leopard Trek's Martin Mortensen escaped from the field and set off in chase of the lead quartet, riding for almost 8 miles (13 km) until they caught the remnants of the breakaway; White had already slid back as would Antogna and Friedman, leaving Barta to partner Tjallingii and Mortensen. As the field completed the circuits, the lead that the trio out front had was diminishing by the kilometer, and with two laps to go, the gap stood at just 30 seconds. Within the next 6 miles (9.7 km), they were pulled back by the peloton's strong pace, mainly set by the sprinter teams again, consisting of HTC–Highroad, Liquigas–Cannondale, Saxo Bank–SunGard and Team Sky.

Once the breakaway was caught, Saxo Bank–SunGard took to the front in the hope of setting up Juan José Haedo for a stage win that had eluded during the week and were joined by Team Sky, who were hoping to get their third stage win of the week, with Ben Swift looking to bookend the stages having won the first-run stage – Stage 2 – of the week in Sacramento. Bernhard Eisel made a mistake in the closing stages which compromised the run-in for HTC–Highroad, leaving the honors to Leigh Howard to pace Matthew Goss for the sprint. Points classification leader Peter Sagan (Liquigas–Cannondale) was also helped towards the front by Daniel Oss, as he looked to secure the classification for the second successive year. However, Howard timed his run at the appropriate moment, and released Goss with 180 meters to go, and Goss fended off Sagan to take the team's only win of the week. Sagan's second place comfortably confirmed his green jersey for the sprints, while Greg Henderson took third for Team Sky. In the pack, Team RadioShack were untroubled during the day and Chris Horner sealed the overall classification with a 65th place stage finish, ahead of teammate Levi Leipheimer. Tejay van Garderen and Pat McCarty completed the stage to claim the young riders classification and mountains classification respectively, while Barta earned his second "Most Courageous" award of the race.

Stage 8 Result

	Rider	Team	Time
1	Matthew Goss (AUS)	HTC–Highroad	2h 56' 39"
2	Peter Sagan (SVK)	Liquigas–Cannondale	s.t.
3	Greg Henderson (NZL)	Team Sky	s.t.
4	Óscar Freire (ESP)	Rabobank	s.t.
5	Keven Lacombe (CAN)	SpiderTech–C10	s.t.
6	Taylor Phinney (USA)	BMC Racing Team	s.t.
7	Jure Kocjan (SLO)	Team Type 1–Sanofi Aventis	s.t.
8	Ken Hanson (USA)	Jelly Belly–Kenda	s.t.
9	Anibal Borrajo (ARG)	Jamis–Sutter Home	s.t.
10	Juan José Haedo (ARG)	Saxo Bank–SunGard	s.t.

Final General Classification

	Rider	Team	Time
1	Chris Horner (USA)	Team RadioShack	23h 46' 41"
2	Levi Leipheimer (USA)	Team RadioShack	+ 38"
3	Tom Danielson (USA)	Garmin–Cervélo	+ 2' 45"
4	Christian Vande Velde (USA)	Garmin–Cervélo	+ 3' 18"
5	Tejay van Garderen (USA)	HTC–Highroad	+ 3' 23"
6	Laurens ten Dam (NED)	Rabobank	+ 3' 26"
7	Rory Sutherland (AUS)	UnitedHealthcare	+ 4' 12"
8	Andy Schleck (LUX)	Leopard Trek	+ 4' 33"
9	Steve Morabito (SUI)	BMC Racing Team	+ 4' 50"
10	Ryder Hesjedal (CAN)	Garmin–Cervélo	+ 6' 16"

== Women's invitational individual time trial ==
May 20, 2011 — Solvang, 15 miles (24 km) (individual time trial) (ITT)

In conjunction with Stage 6 in Solvang on Friday, May 20, the Tour of California also held a women's invitational individual time trial on the same course. Ultimately, 13 riders competed, including three former world time trial champions in Kristin Armstrong and Amber Neben of the U.S. and Emma Pooley of the U.K. Armstrong edged Neben by 13 seconds to win the race.

Women's ITT Result

	Rider	Team	Time
1	Kristin Armstrong (USA)	Peanut Butter & Co. TWENTY12	34' 29"
2	Amber Neben (USA)	HTC–Highroad	+ 13"
3	Charlotte Becker (GER)	HTC–Highroad	+ 38"
4	Evelyn Stevens (USA)	HTC–Highroad	+ 39"
5	Emma Pooley (UK)	Garmin–Cervélo	+ 48"
6	Tara Whitten (CAN)	Team TIBCO	+ 59"
7	Amanda Miller (USA)	HTC–Highroad	+ 1' 21"
8	Rhae Shaw (CAN)	Hagens Berman Cycling	+ 1' 36"
9	Alison Starnes (USA)	Peanut Butter & Co. TWENTY12	+ 1' 42"
10	Emilia Fahlin (SWE)	HTC–Highroad	+ 1' 50"

== Classification leadership ==
In the 2011 Tour of California, five different jerseys were awarded. For the general classification, calculated by adding the finishing times of the stages per cyclist, the leader received a yellow jersey. This classification was considered the most important of the Tour of California, and the winner of the general classification was considered the winner of the Tour of California.

Additionally, there was also a sprints classification, akin to what is called the points classification in other races, which awarded a green jersey. In the sprints classification, cyclists received points for finishing in the top 10 in a stage. The winner received 15 points, second place 12, third 10, fourth 7, and one point less per place down the line, to a single point for tenth. In addition, some points were able to be won in intermediate sprints.

There was also a mountains classification, which awarded a red jersey. In the mountains classification, points were won by reaching the top of a mountain before other cyclists. Each climb was categorized, either hors-, first-, second-, third-, or fourth-category, with more points available for the harder climbs.

There was also a youth classification. This classification was calculated in the same way as the general classification, but only young cyclists (under 23) were included. The leader of the young rider classification received a white jersey.

The fifth jersey was not awarded on the basis of a time or points-based classification. It was for each stage's "Most Courageous" rider, akin to the combativity award in the Tour de France. The rider who received this award was given a blue jersey on the podium, but wore his regular jersey (unless holding one of the above four) in the next stage, and could be recognized from his back number: marked with a white number on a red background instead of the usual black on white. Unlike the Tour de France's combativity award, there was no overall award given.

There was also a classification for teams. In this classification, the times of the best three cyclists per stage were added, and the team with the lowest time were classified as the leader of the classification.

Stage	Winner	General Classification	Youth Classification	Mountains Classification	Sprint Classification	Most Courageous	Team Classification
1	stage cancelled	–	–	–	–	–	–
2	Ben Swift	Ben Swift	Peter Sagan	not awarded	Ben Swift	Jamey Driscoll	Team Sky
3	Greg Henderson	Greg Henderson	Peter Sagan	not awarded	Peter Sagan	Jan Bárta	Team Sky
4	Chris Horner	Chris Horner	Andrew Talansky	Pat McCarty	Peter Sagan	Ryder Hesjedal	Garmin–Cervélo
5	Peter Sagan	Chris Horner	Tejay van Garderen	Pat McCarty	Peter Sagan	Óscar Freire	Garmin–Cervélo
6	David Zabriskie	Chris Horner	Tejay van Garderen	Pat McCarty	Peter Sagan	Tejay van Garderen	Garmin–Cervélo
7	Levi Leipheimer	Chris Horner	Tejay van Garderen	Pat McCarty	Peter Sagan	Alexander Efimkin	Garmin–Cervélo
8	Matthew Goss	Chris Horner	Tejay van Garderen	Pat McCarty	Peter Sagan	Jan Bárta	Garmin–Cervélo
Final		Chris Horner	Tejay van Garderen	Pat McCarty	Peter Sagan	n/a	Garmin–Cervélo

== Final standings ==
=== General Classification ===
#	Rider	Team	Time
1	Chris Horner (USA)	Team RadioShack	23h 46' 41"
2	Levi Leipheimer (USA)	Team RadioShack	+ 38"
3	Tom Danielson (USA)	Garmin–Cervélo	+ 2' 45"
4	Christian Vande Velde (USA)	Garmin–Cervélo	+ 3' 18"
5	Tejay van Garderen (USA)	HTC–Highroad	+ 3' 23"
6	Laurens ten Dam (NED)	Rabobank	+ 3' 26"
7	Rory Sutherland (AUS)	UnitedHealthcare	+ 4' 12"
8	Andy Schleck (LUX)	Leopard Trek	+ 4' 33"
9	Steve Morabito (SUI)	BMC Racing Team	+ 4' 50"
10	Ryder Hesjedal (CAN)	Garmin–Cervélo	+ 6' 16"

=== Teams Classification ===
#	Team	Time
1	Garmin–Cervélo	71h 29' 37"
2	Team RadioShack	+ 1' 41"
3	BMC Racing Team	+ 13' 03"
4	Rabobank	+ 13' 34"
5	UnitedHealthcare	+ 14' 27"
6	Leopard Trek	+ 15' 32"
7	HTC–Highroad	+ 16' 14"
8	Liquigas–Cannondale	+ 17' 16"
9	Saxo Bank–SunGard	+ 27' 14"
10	Bissell	+ 31' 24"

=== King of the Mountains Classification ===
#	Rider	Team	Points
1	Pat McCarty (USA)	SpiderTech–C10	39
2	Levi Leipheimer (USA)	Team RadioShack	24
3	Chris Horner (USA)	Team RadioShack	20
4	Tom Danielson (USA)	Garmin–Cervélo	12
5	Andy Schleck (LUX)	Leopard Trek	12
6	Ryder Hesjedal (CAN)	Garmin–Cervélo	12
7	Andrew Talansky (USA)	Garmin–Cervélo	11
8	Rob Britton (CAN)	Bissell	11
9	Will Routley (CAN)	SpiderTech–C10	10
10	Matthew Busche (USA)	Team RadioShack	10

=== Sprint Classification ===
#	Rider	Team	Points
1	Peter Sagan (SVK)	Liquigas–Cannondale	46
2	Greg Henderson (NZL)	Team Sky	25
3	Ben Swift (GBR)	Team Sky	25
4	Matthew Goss (AUS)	HTC–Highroad	25
5	Juan José Haedo (ARG)	Saxo Bank–SunGard	19
6	Leigh Howard (AUS)	HTC–Highroad	18
7	Keven Lacombe (CAN)	SpiderTech–C10	18
8	Óscar Freire (ESP)	Rabobank	14
9	Taylor Phinney (USA)	BMC Racing Team	14
10	Jan Bárta (CZE)	Team NetApp	10

=== Young Rider Classification ===
#	Rider	Team	Time
1	Tejay van Garderen (USA)	HTC–Highroad	23h 50' 04"
2	Andrew Talansky (USA)	Garmin–Cervélo	+ 5' 58"
3	Rafał Majka (POL)	Saxo Bank–SunGard	+ 14' 20"
4	Peter Sagan (SVK)	Liquigas–Cannondale	+ 16' 46"
5	Tim Roe (AUS)	BMC Racing Team	+ 25' 29"
6	Ben King (USA)	Team RadioShack	+ 31' 52"
7	Yannick Eijssen (BEL)	BMC Racing Team	+ 37' 48"
8	Leigh Howard (AUS)	HTC–Highroad	+ 39' 33"
9	Taylor Phinney (USA)	BMC Racing Team	+ 54' 27"
10	Coen Vermeltfoort (NED)	Rabobank	+ 56' 01"
