= 2012 Grand Prix Cycliste de Québec =

2012 UCI World Tour, race 25 of 28

Race details
- Dates: 7 September 2012
- Stages: 1
- Distance: 201.6 km (125.3 mi)
- Winning time: 4h 53' 04"

Results
	Winner	Simon Gerrans (Australia)	(Orica–GreenEDGE)
	Second	Greg Van Avermaet (Belgium)	(BMC Racing Team)
	Third	Rui Costa (Portugal)	(Movistar Team)

The 2012 Grand Prix Cycliste de Québec was the third edition of the Grand Prix Cycliste de Québec, a single-day professional bicycle road race. It was held on 7 September 2012, over a distance of 201.6 km (125.3 mi), starting and finishing in Quebec City, Quebec, Canada. It was the 25th event of the 2012 UCI World Tour season. The race is one of the only two events which are part of the World Tour calendar in North America, the other one being the Grand Prix Cycliste de Montreal contested two days later.

In a two-up sprint finish, Australian national champion Simon Gerrans of the Orica–GreenEDGE team won the race, after following an attack by BMC Racing Team's Greg Van Avermaet in the closing stages of the race, with the two riders working together to get clear and Gerrans prevailing on the uphill finish on the Grande-Allée. Van Avermaet was second, while the peloton was led home by the 2011 Grand Prix Cycliste de Montreal winner Rui Costa (Movistar Team), four seconds in arrears.

== Course ==
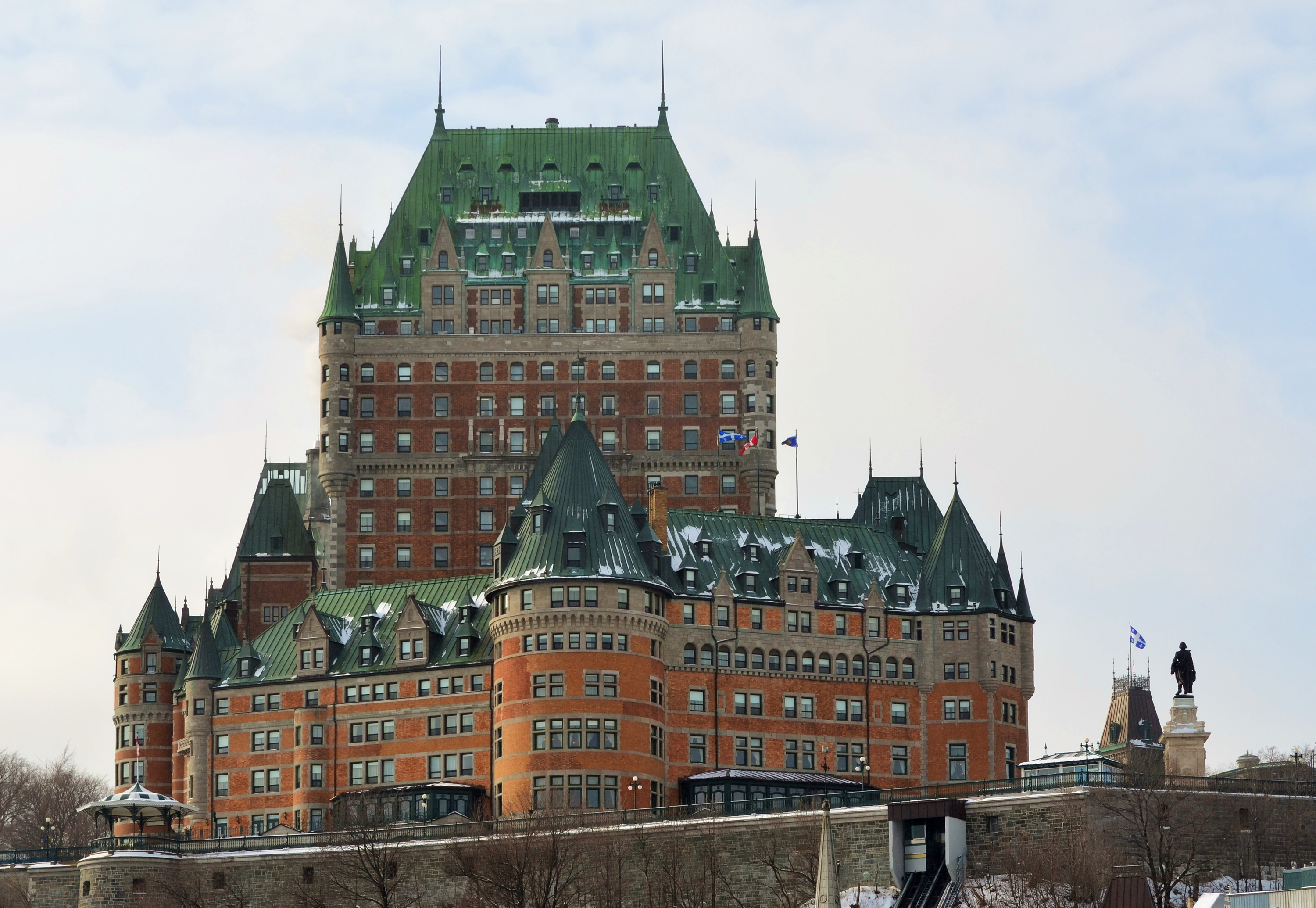
The Château Frontenac was the official hotel of the race and lodged the riders and crew members over 4–8 September.

The race consisted of 16 laps of a circuit 12.6 km (7.8 mi) in length, with exactly the same course as the 2011 edition. The circuit was well-suited for climbers and puncheurs, since the finish was situated on an uphill climb, located on the Grande-Allée street, in the heart of Old Québec and the course featured steep climbs. The final stretch was a wide, straight line with a regular 4% gradient. The total vertical climb of the race was 2,976 metres (9,764 ft). The major difficulties were:

- Kilometre 9: Côte de la Montagne: 375 metres (1,230 feet) with an average gradient of 10%, with a pass of 165 metres (541 feet) metres at 13%
- Kilometre 10: Côte de la Potasse: 420 metres (1,380 feet) with an average gradient of 9%
- Kilometre 11: Côte de la Fabrique: 190 metres (620 feet) with an average gradient of 7%
- Kilometre 11: Climb to the finish line: 1,000 metres (3,300 feet) with an average gradient of 4%

It is worth noting that the Côte Gilmour descent included a technical passage, 2 successive left bends of 90 degrees each, the first of which was negotiated while the descending slope had a gradient of more than 10%. After the last of the two bends, the riders were rolling on the Boulevard Champlain on the Saint Lawrence River's shores for 4 kilometres (2.5 miles) which were exposed to the wind.

== Teams ==
As the Grand Prix Cycliste de Québec was a UCI World Tour event, all 18 UCI ProTeams were invited automatically and obligated to send a squad. There were also three wildcard invitations, which were UCI Professional Continental teams: two French squads (Cofidis and Team Europcar) and a Canadian one (SpiderTech–C10). A Canadian national squad also competed in the race, and as such, formed the event's 22-team peloton.

The 22 teams that competed in the race were:

- Ag2r–La Mondiale
- Astana
- BMC Racing Team
- Canada (national team)
- Cofidis
- Team Europcar
- Euskaltel–Euskadi
- FDJ–BigMat
- Garmin–Sharp
- Team Katusha
- Lampre–ISD
- Liquigas–Cannondale
- Lotto–Belisol
- Movistar Team
- Omega Pharma–Quick-Step
- Orica–GreenEDGE
- Rabobank
- RadioShack–Nissan
- Saxo Bank–Tinkoff Bank
- Team Sky
- SpiderTech–C10
- Vacansoleil–DCM

== Race summary ==
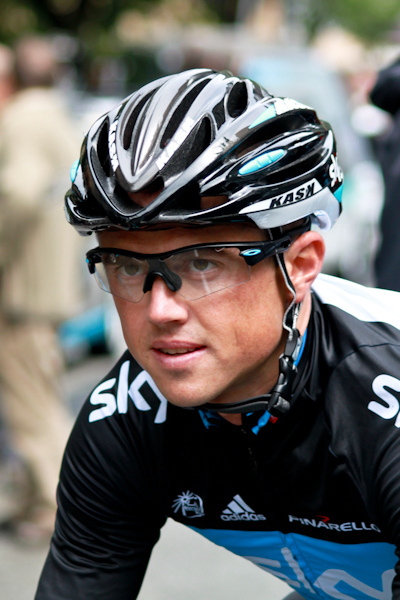
The winner, Australian Simon Gerrans.

The start was given by the mayor of Quebec City, Régis Labeaume, and the former French Prime Minister Alain Juppé. During the second lap of the 16 laps race, eight men went clear of the peloton, they were soon joined by a sizable number of riders and were brought back 45 kilometres (28 mi) into the race. On lap 4, another escape group formed, initiated by Thomas Rohregger (RadioShack–Nissan), who was chased by Vladimir Gusev (Team Katusha), both men had been part of an earlier breakaway. The group ballooned to eight riders when the chasing group made contact, and the escapees sailed to a maximum lead of 6' 10". With six laps remaining, Team Europcar and Garmin–Sharp took the lead of the bunch and worked to bring the dangerous break back, which they ultimately did with only two laps to go, on the steep Côte de la Montagne.

Soon thereafter, Saxo Bank–Tinkoff Bank's Chris Anker Sørensen and Canadian national team member Bruno Langlois tried their luck and built a small 20 seconds gap by the start of the penultimate lap. Langlois was ultimately dropped and replaced by Dries Devenyns (Omega Pharma–Quick-Step) near the finish line as the bell sounded the last lap. The pair held on, but was caught on the Boulevard Champlain with 4 kilometres (2.5 mi) to go. Greg Van Avermaet (BMC Racing Team) attacked in the Côte de la Montagne, soon followed by Simon Gerrans (Orica–GreenEDGE). Liquigas–Cannondale's Peter Sagan made a move in a bid to catch the two men, but fell short after approaching to 30 metres (98 ft) of the duet and was swallowed by the charging bunch in the final kilometre. While the surging chase group was on their heels, Gerrans out sprinted the Belgian Van Avermaet to take the victory. Rui Costa of Movistar Team was the faster man of the chase group and took third place.

Quebecer François Parisien of SpiderTech–C10 survived a fall in the first lap of the race to finish in tenth position, the best placed Canadian of the race only 4 seconds in arrears of Gerrans, while Bruno Langlois won the King of the Mountains classification and took 30th place. Pre-race favourite Ryder Hesjedal had a difficult day, finishing with a 5' 18" deficit. Gerrans stated after the race: "This is some of the hardest racing on the calendar. It's fantastic racing in Québec on an exciting circuit with great crowds and great ambience."

== Results ==
	Cyclist	Team	Time	UCI World Tour Points
1	Simon Gerrans (AUS)	Orica–GreenEDGE	4h 53' 04"	80
2	Greg Van Avermaet (BEL)	BMC Racing Team	s.t.	60
3	Rui Costa (POR)	Movistar Team	+ 4"	50
4	Luca Paolini (ITA)	Team Katusha	+ 4"	40
5	Tom-Jelte Slagter (NED)	Rabobank	+ 4"	30
6	Diego Ulissi (ITA)	Lampre–ISD	+ 4"	22
7	Thomas Voeckler (FRA)	Team Europcar	+ 4"	–
8	Fabian Wegmann (GER)	Garmin–Sharp	+ 4"	10
9	Gerald Ciolek (GER)	Omega Pharma–Quick-Step	+ 4"	6
10	François Parisien (CAN)	SpiderTech–C10	+ 4"	–
