= Sebastian Salas =

Canadian racing cyclist

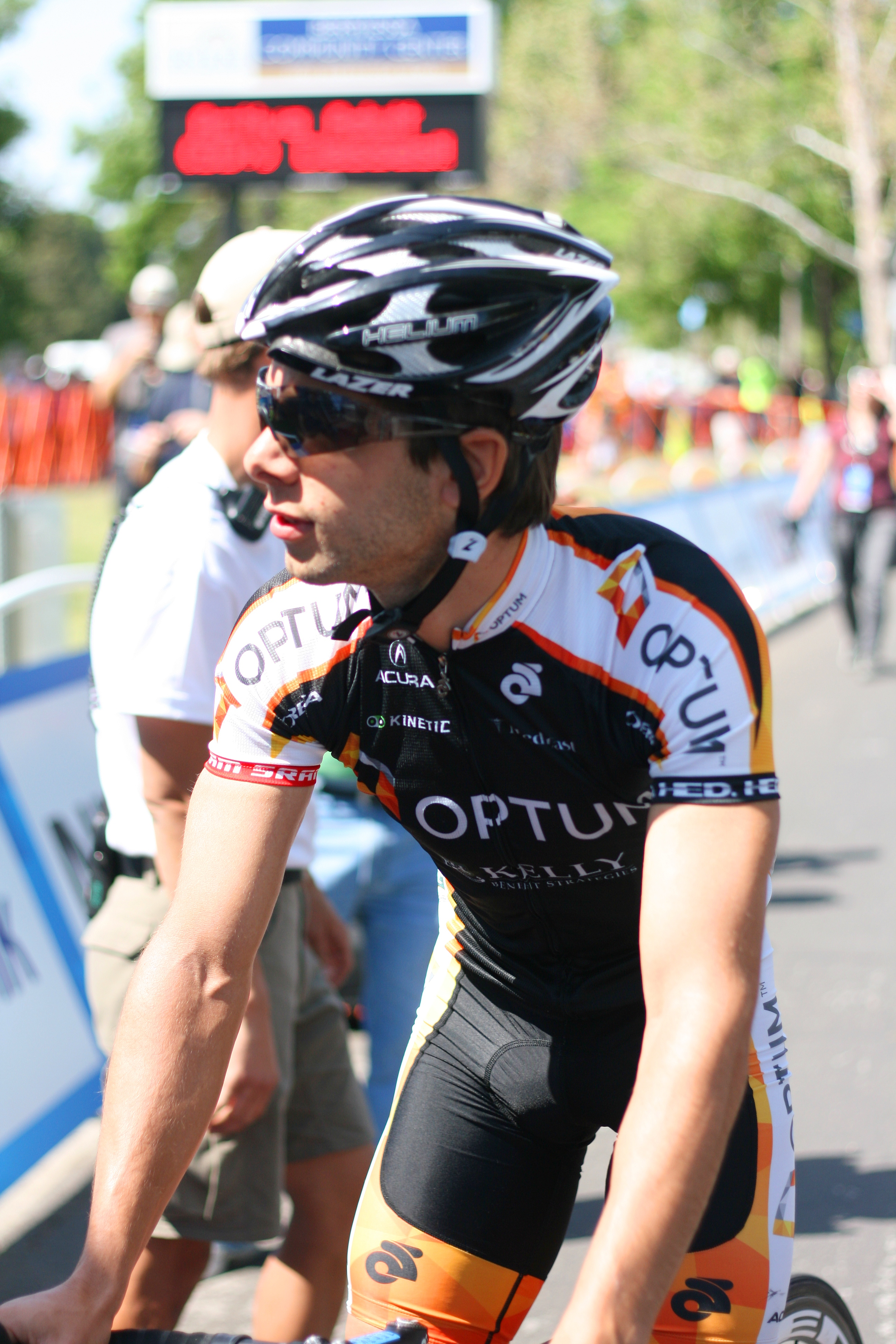
- Salas at the 2012 Tour of California

Personal information
- Full name: Sebastian Salas
- Nicknames: Seb, Sebway, The Seb Man, Seb-Guy, Sebaronni, The Big Seb
- Born: October 2, 1987 (age 39) Vancouver, British Columbia, Canada
- Height: 1.72 m (5 ft 8 in)
- Weight: 63 kg (139 lb)

Cycling career
- Sport: Cycling
- Current team: Retired
- Discipline: Road
- Role: Rider
- Rider type: Climber

Professional teams
- 2011: Team Exergy
- 2012–2013: Optum–Kelly Benefit Strategies

Sebastian Salas (born October 2, 1987) is a Canadian former professional road racing cyclist who started his career in 2011 with Team Exergy. He switched to Optum–Kelly Benefit Strategies the following year. He distinguished himself in the 2012 Tour of California by winning the King of the Mountains competition, which he led from the third stage until the end of the eight stage race. Starting in 2014, Salas served a two-year doping violation ban issued by the Canadian Centre for Ethics in Sport for missing a 2013 in-competition doping test.

== Major results ==
2011
7th National Road Race Championships
2012
6th National Road Race Championships
Tour of California

1st Mountains classification

6th Overall Tour of the Gila
9th Overall Tour de Beauce
