= François Parisien =

Canadian cyclist

Personal information
- Full name: François Parisien
- Nickname: Frank
- Born: 27 April 1982 (age 44) Repentigny, Quebec, Canada
- Height: 1.71 m (5 ft 7 in)
- Weight: 62 kg (137 lb)

Cycling career
- Sport: Cycling
- Current team: Retired
- Discipline: Road
- Role: Rider

Professional teams
- 2006–2007: TIAA–CREF
- 2008: Symmetrics
- 2008–2012: Team R.A.C.E. Pro
- 2013: Argos–Shimano

Major wins
- National Road Race Championships (2005); Tour of Elk Grove (2012)

François Parisien (born 27 April 1982) is a former professional cyclist born in Repentigny, Quebec, Canada. He competed as a professional between 2006 and 2013.

== Professional career ==
In 2005, Parisien won the Canadian Road Race Championship.

He participated to the 2010 Tour of California and placed in the top ten on the second stage where he came in sixth position, finishing in the same group as Australian Brett Lancaster who won the stage. He performed well the very next day on the undulating stage 3, ranking in a ninth position as he was part of a small group of about 30 riders that came in after 3 escapees crossed the line, the victor being David Zabriskie (Garmin–Transitions).

In 2012, he won the Tour of Elk Grove Overall classification by the slim margin of one second over John Murphy of the Kenda-5-hour Energy team. In August, he finished short of the podium in the Italian semi-classic Tre Valli Varesine, in fourth place. His fellow countryman from Quebec David Veilleux of Team Europcar took a solo victory by a margin of a little more than a minute over the group Parisien was part of. In September, Parisien finished tenth of the World Tour race Grand Prix Cycliste de Québec, therefore being awarded the "Best Canadian Placing" award.

After SpiderTech–C10 folded, Parisien was hired by newly World Tour promoted team Argos–Shimano for the 2013 season. In March 2013, Parisien took the biggest victory of his career at that time as he beat Samuel Dumoulin for the bunch sprint in stage 5 of the Volta a Catalunya. An ecstatic Parisien stated that his team had concluded prior to the race that he had to be in the top 3 riders coming out of the last turn to have a chance at victory, and he followed that plan.

Parisien retired at the end of the 2013 season, after eight years as a professional. He then became an analyst for bicycle races for Réseau des sports, a Quebecer Sports Television provider.

== Palmarès ==
2005
1st National Road Race Championships
2008
5th US Air Force Cycling Classic
8th Overall Tour de Beauce
8th Commerce Bank Reading Classic
2009
2nd Overall Vuelta a Cuba

1st Stage 7a (ITT)

7th US Air Force Cycling Classic
2010
1st Stage 2 Vuelta Mexico Telmex
6th Overall Tour de Beauce
2012
1st Overall Tour of Elk Grove
4th Tre Valli Varesine
10th Grand Prix Cycliste de Québec
2013
1st Stage 5 Volta a Catalunya
