= Raymond Künzli =

Swiss cyclist

Personal information
- Full name: Raymond Künzli
- Born: 1 September 1984 (age 42) St-Imier, Bern, Switzerland
- Height: 1.88 m (6 ft 2 in)
- Weight: 69 kg (152 lb; 10.9 st)

Cycling career
- Sport: Cycling
- Current team: Retired
- Discipline: Road
- Role: Rider
- Rider type: All-rounder

Amateur teams
- 2009: Bürgis Cycling Team
- 2010: Team Bürgi Fidi BC
- 2011: EKZ Racing Team

Professional team
- 2012: SpiderTech–C10

Raymond Künzli (born 1 September 1984) is a retired Swiss professional road racing cyclist. He competed for SpiderTech–C10, a UCI ProConTeam, in 2012. Born in St-Imier, Bern, Künzli currently resides in Sonvilier, Bern, Switzerland.

== Palmarès ==
2010
8th, Overall, Cinturón a Mallorca
2011
3rd, Overall, Cinturón a Mallorca
