= Sylvain Georges =

French cyclist

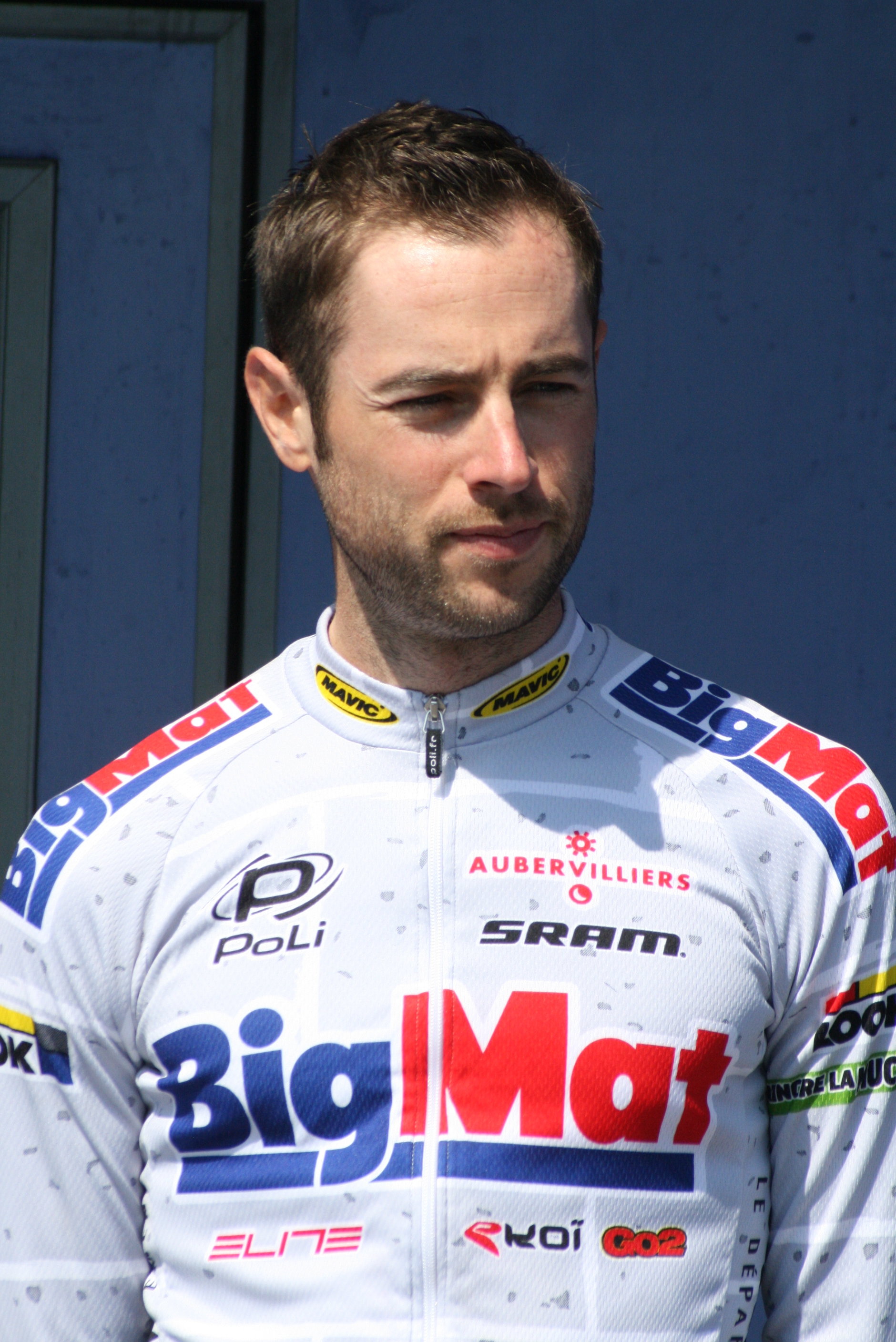
- Georges at the 2011 Four Days of Dunkirk.

Personal information
- Full name: Sylvain Georges
- Born: 1 May 1984 (age 42) Beaumont, France

Cycling career
- Sport: Cycling
- Discipline: Road
- Role: Rider

Professional teams
- 2008: A-Style-Somn
- 2011: BigMat–Auber 93
- 2012–2013: Ag2r–La Mondiale

Sylvain Georges (born 1 May 1984) is a professional French racing cyclist who last rode for Ag2r–La Mondiale. He was born in Beaumont, Puy-de-Dôme, France. On 18 May 2012, Georges won his first pro tour stage on the 6th stage of the Tour of California, where he broke away with six other riders at the start of a mountain stage leading to Big Bear Lake and rode solo for the last 50 kilometers to take the win as the peloton was in sight.

In May 2013 Georges withdrew from the Giro D'Italia after testing positive for Heptaminol. He was later sacked by his team.

== Palmarès ==
2005
7th Chrono Champenois
2006
3rd Time trial, French Under–23 Road Championships
4th Chrono Champenois
2007
2nd Overall Tour du Loir-et-Cher
2008
7th Grand Prix de la Ville de Lillers
2009
1st Prologue 45ème Circuit De Saône Et Loire
3rd Overall Grand Prix Chantal Biya
2010
8th Overall Rhône-Alpes Isère Tour
2011
1st Overall Rhône-Alpes Isère Tour

1st Stages 1 & 3

1st GP Plumelec-Morbihan
2nd Grand Prix d'Ouverture La Marseillaise
10th Tour du Finistère
2012
1st Stage 6 Tour of California
2nd Tour du Doubs
2013
2nd Paris–Camembert
4th Les Boucles du Sud Ardèche
2015
1st Stage 8a Tour de Guadeloupe
2016
1st Stage 7 Tour de Guadeloupe

Grand Tour general classification results timeline

Grand Tour	2013
Giro d'Italia	DNF
Tour de France	—
Vuelta a España	—

Legend
—	Did not compete
DNF	Did not finish
