= Keven Lacombe =

Canadian cyclist

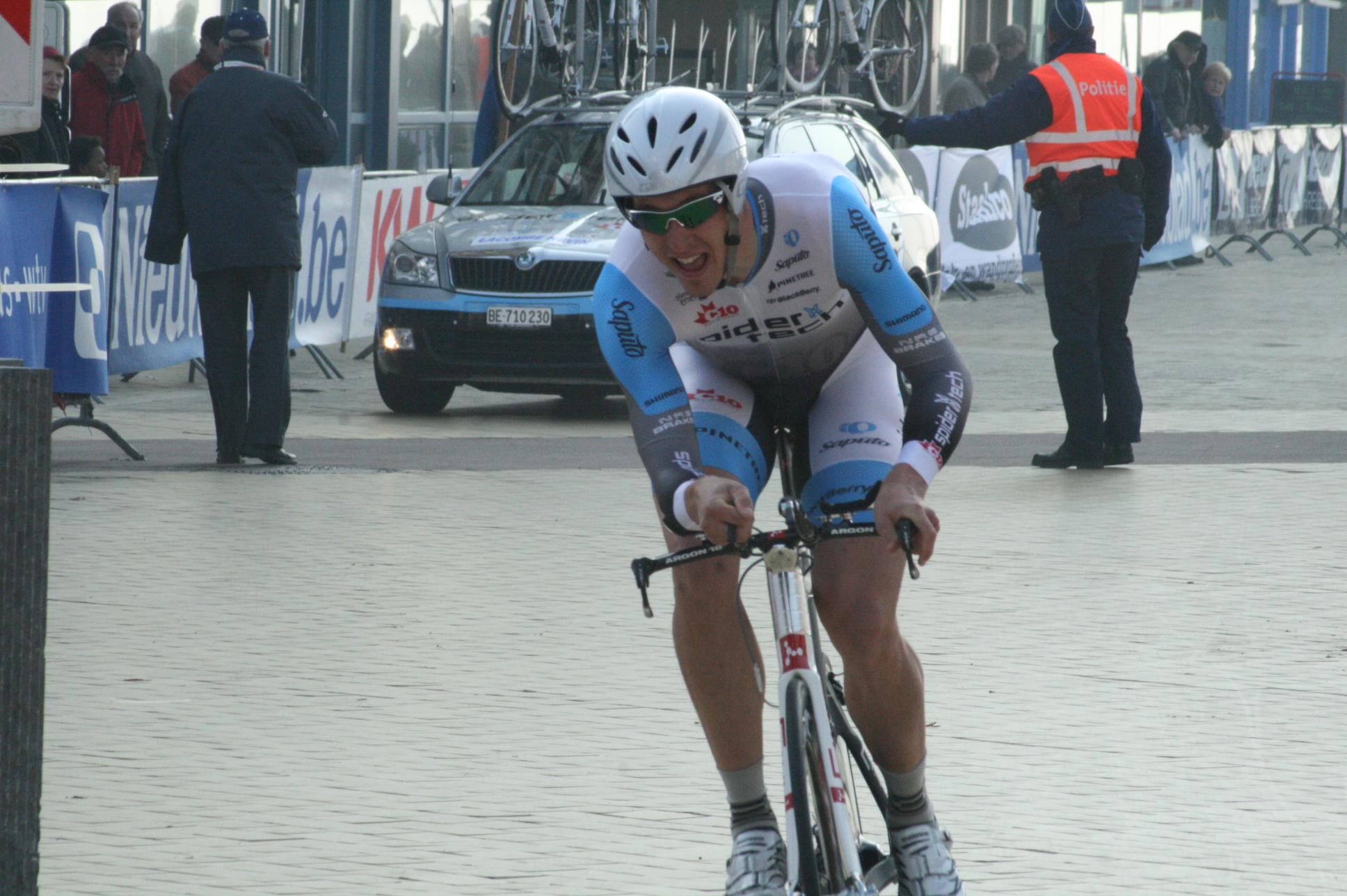
- Lacombe at the 2011 Driedaagse van West-Vlaanderen

Personal information
- Born: 12 July 1985 (age 41) Amos, Quebec, Canada

Cycling career
- Sport: Cycling
- Current team: SpiderTech–C10
- Discipline: Road
- Role: Rider

Amateur team
- 2007: Team Volkswagen-Trek

Professional teams
- 2007–2008: Kelly Benefit Strategies–Medifast
- 2009–2012: Planet Energy

Major wins
- Canadian junior time-trial champion (2003)

Keven Lacombe (born July 12, 1985 in Amos, Quebec) is a Canadian professional racing cyclist. He was also an ice hockey player for Drummondville Voltigeurs of the Quebec Major Junior Hockey League.

== Career highlights ==
1. 2003: Canadian junior time-trial champion
2. 2007: 1st in Stage 3 Coupe de la Paix
3. 2007: 1st in Stage 5 Vuelta a Chihuahua
4. 2008: 1st in Stage 2 Tour of Pennsylvania
5. 2009: 1st in Stage 1 Vuelta a Cuba
6. 2009: 1st in Stage 9a Vuelta a Cuba
7. 2009: 1st in Stage 9b Vuelta a Cuba
8. 2009: 1st in Stage 10 Vuelta a Cuba
9. 2010: 1st in Stage 4 Vuelta a Cuba
10. 2010: 1st in Stage 9 Vuelta a Cuba
11. 2010: 1st in Grand Prix des Marbriers
