= Team Exergy =

Professional cycling team (2009–2012)

Team information
- UCI code: XRG
- Registered: United States
- Founded: 2009
- Disbanded: 2012
- Discipline: Road
- Status: UCI Continental Team

Team Exergy was a professional cycling team, classified as a Continental pro team as of 2009. They participated in the 2011 and 2012 USA Pro Cycling Challenge. Former Tour de France rider Fred Rodriguez was a member of the 2012 team.

On 29 November 2012, it was announced that Exergy Development Group would drop its sponsorship of cycling for 2013, citing the doping scandals that had occurred at the time, namely the USADA doping investigation of Lance Armstrong and the U.S. Postal Service cycling team. As a result, the team collapsed.

== Major wins ==
2012
1st Stage 3 Tour de Beauce, Matt Cooke
