= SpiderTech–C10 =

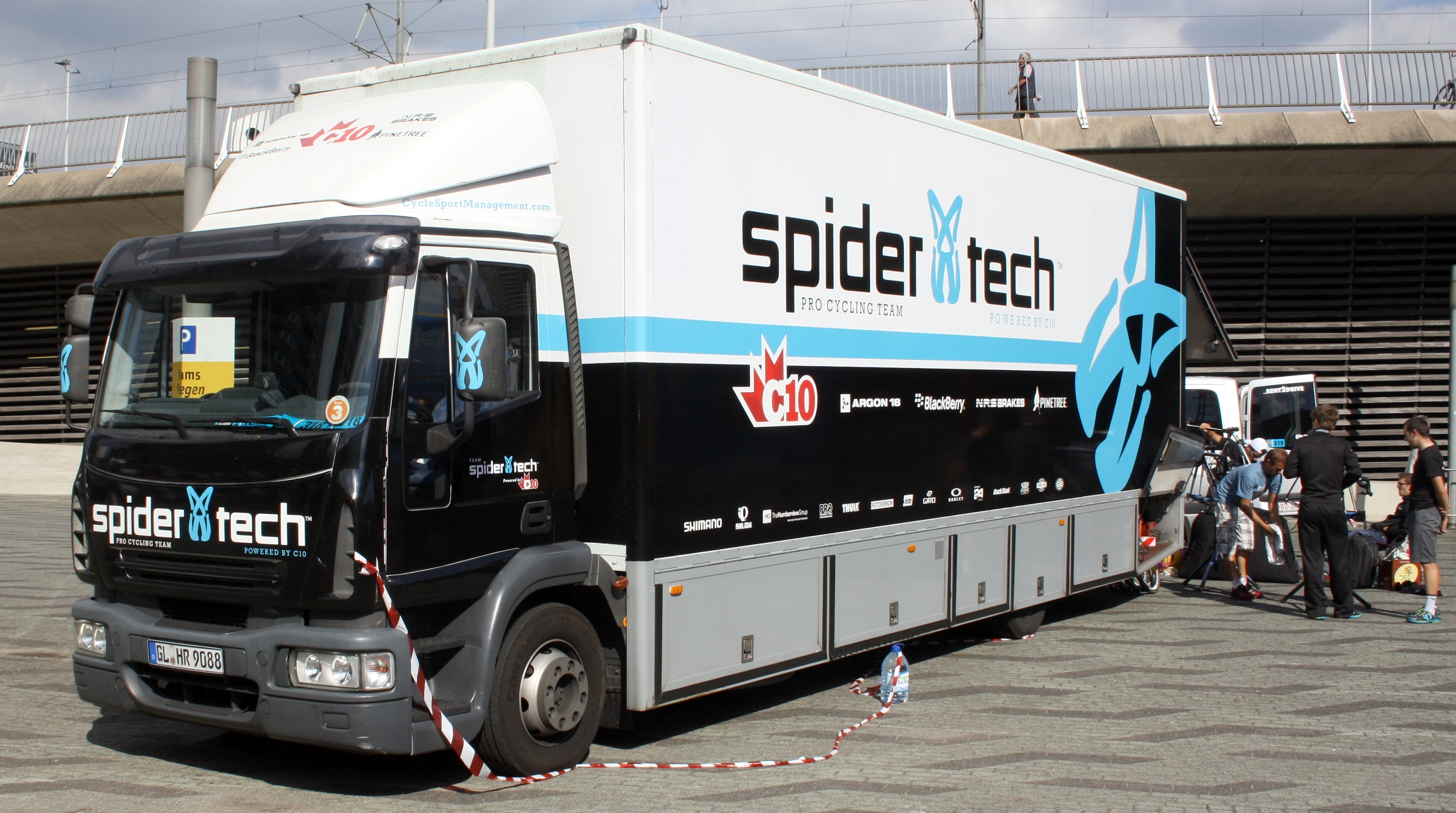

Team information
- UCI code: SPI
- Registered: Canada
- Founded: 2008
- Disbanded: 2012
- Discipline: Road
- Status: UCI Professional Continental
- Bicycles: Argon 18
- Website: Team home page

Key personnel
- General manager: Josée Larocque
- Team managers: Steve Bauer, Kevin Field

Team name history
- 2008 2009 2010 2011–2012: Team R.A.C.E. Pro; Planet Energy; SpiderTech p/b Planet Energy; Spidertech p/b C10
SpiderTech–C10 jersey
Jersey

SpiderTech powered by C10 was a UCI Professional Continental cycling team based in Canada that participated in UCI Continental Circuits races. The team was founded in 2007 by Cycle Sport Management. The team obtained a UCI Continental licence for its first season (2008) under the name of "Team R.A.C.E. Pro" (TRP), "Team Planet Energy" (TPE) in 2009 and SpiderTech powered by Planet Energy (CSM) in 2010. In December 2010 the team was granted a UCI Pro Continental licence for the 2011 and 2012 seasons under the name of SpiderTech powered by C10 (SPI). In October 2012, the team announced that it would take a pause in 2013, since its title sponsor withdrew its sponsorship at the last minute leaving the team without choice to suspend its activities.

== 2012 Roster ==
As of 16 March 2012.

Rider	Date of birth
Ryan Anderson (CAN)	22 July 1987 (age 39)
Zachary Bell (CAN)	14 November 1982 (age 43)
David Boily (CAN)	28 April 1990 (age 36)
Guillaume Boivin (CAN)	25 May 1989 (age 37)
Antoine Duchesne(trainee) (CAN)	12 September 1991 (age 34)
Flavio De Luna (MEX)	26 January 1990 (age 36)
Lucas Euser (USA)	5 December 1983 (age 42)
Caleb Fairly (USA)	19 February 1987 (age 39)
Martin Gilbert (CAN)	30 October 1982 (age 43)
Hugo Houle (CAN)	27 September 1990 (age 35)

Rider	Date of birth
Raymond Künzli (SUI)	1 September 1984 (age 42)
Kevin Lacombe (CAN)	12 July 1985 (age 41)
Simon Lambert-Lemay (CAN)	16 July 1990 (age 36)
Jonathan McCarty (USA)	24 January 1982 (age 44)
François Parisien (CAN)	27 April 1982 (age 44)
Ryan Roth (CAN)	10 January 1983 (age 43)
Will Routley (CAN)	23 May 1983 (age 43)
Bjørn Selander (USA)	28 January 1988 (age 38)
Brian Vandborg (DEN)	4 December 1981 (age 44)

== 2011 Roster ==
Rider	Date of birth
Ryan Anderson (CAN)	22 July 1987 (age 39)
Mark Batty (CAN)	7 December 1986 (age 39)
Zachary Bell (CAN)	14 November 1982 (age 43)
David Boily (CAN)	28 April 1990 (age 36)
Guillaume Boivin (CAN)	25 May 1989 (age 37)
Flavio De Luna (MEX)	26 January 1990 (age 36)
Lucas Euser (USA)	5 December 1983 (age 42)
Martin Gilbert (CAN)	30 October 1982 (age 43)
Hugo Houle (CAN)	27 September 1990 (age 35)
Kevin Lacombe (CAN)	12 July 1985 (age 41)

Rider	Date of birth
Simon Lambert-Lemay (CAN)	16 July 1990 (age 36)
Bruno Langlois (CAN)	1 March 1979 (age 47)
Jonathan McCarty (USA)	24 January 1982 (age 44)
François Parisien (CAN)	27 April 1982 (age 44)
Andrew Randell (CAN)	4 November 1974 (age 51)
Ryan Roth (CAN)	10 January 1983 (age 43)
Will Routley (CAN)	23 May 1983 (age 43)
Svein Tuft (CAN)	9 May 1977 (age 49)
Charly Vivies (CAN)	9 October 1986 (age 39)

== 2010 Roster ==
Rider	Date of birth
Mark Batty (CAN)	7 December 1986 (age 39)
David Boily (CAN)	28 April 1990 (age 36)
Eric Boily (CAN)	19 June 1987 (age 39)
Guillaume Boivin (CAN)	25 May 1989 (age 37)
Stephane Cossette (CAN)	3 July 1989 (age 37)
Flavio De Luna (MEX)	26 January 1990 (age 36)
Lucas Euser (USA)	5 December 1983 (age 42)
Martin Gilbert (CAN)	30 October 1982 (age 43)

Rider	Date of birth
Kevin Lacombe (CAN)	12 July 1985 (age 41)
Simon Lambert-Lemay (CAN)	16 July 1990 (age 36)
Bruno Langlois (CAN)	1 March 1979 (age 47)
François Parisien (CAN)	27 April 1982 (age 44)
Andrew Randell (CAN)	4 November 1974 (age 51)
Ryan Roth (CAN)	10 January 1983 (age 43)
Charly Vives (CAN)	9 October 1986 (age 39)

== 2009 Roster ==
Rider	Date of birth
Mark Batty (CAN)	7 December 1986 (age 39)
Eric Boily (CAN)	19 June 1987 (age 39)
Guillaume Boivin (trainee) (CAN)	25 May 1989 (age 37)
Joël Dion-Poitras (CAN)	28 February 1987 (age 39)
Andrew Hunt (CAN)	10 May 1988 (age 38)
Martin Gilbert (CAN)	30 October 1982 (age 43)
Kevin Lacombe (CAN)	12 July 1985 (age 41)
Bruno Langlois (CAN)	1 March 1979 (age 47)

Rider	Date of birth
Kevin Buck Miller (CAN)	7 October 1982 (age 43)
François Parisien (CAN)	27 April 1982 (age 44)
Keir Plaice (CAN)	29 December 1988 (age 37)
Andrew Randell (CAN)	4 November 1974 (age 51)
Ryan Roth (CAN)	10 January 1983 (age 43)
Charly Vivies (CAN)	9 October 1986 (age 39)
Maxim Vives (CAN)	25 June 1984 (age 42)

== 2008 Roster ==
Rider	Date of birth
Mark Batty (CAN)	7 December 1986 (age 39)
Joël Dion-Poitras (CAN)	28 February 1987 (age 39)
Andrew Hunt (CAN)	10 May 1988 (age 38)
Dustin Macburnie (CAN)	25 August 1982 (age 44)
Kevin Buck Miller (CAN)	7 October 1982 (age 43)
François Parisien (CAN)	27 April 1982 (age 44)
Keir Plaice (CAN)	29 December 1988 (age 37)

Rider	Date of birth
Mark Pozniak (CAN)	26 September 1985 (age 40)
Ryan Robertson (CAN)	19 February 1986 (age 40)
Ryan Roth (CAN)	10 January 1983 (age 43)
Adam Thuss (CAN)	6 March 1986 (age 40)
Dan Timmerman (USA)	24 June 1980 (age 46)
Mark Walters (CAN)	15 February 1976 (age 50)

== Major wins ==
2008
Stage 1 Rochester Omnium, Ryan Roth
2009
Stages 1, 9a, 9b & 10 Vuelta a Cuba, Keven Lacombe
Stage 4 Vuelta a Cuba, Martin Gilbert
Stage 7a Vuelta a Cuba, François Parisien
Stage 7 Tour of Missouri, Martin Gilbert
2010
Stages 4 & 9a Vuelta a Cuba, Keven Lacombe
Stages 5 & 13 Vuelta a Cuba, Martin Gilbert
Stage 7a Vuelta a Cuba, Ryan Roth
Stage 11 Vuelta a Cuba, Guillaume Boivin
Stage 1 Vuelta a la Independencia Nacional, Bruno Langlois
Stage 6a Vuelta a la Independencia Nacional, Eric Boily
Stages 8 & 10 Vuelta al Uruguay, Martin Gilbert
Stage 2 Vuelta Mexico, Flavio De Luna
Stage 8 Vuelta Mexico, François Parisien
Stages 1 & 3 Mi-Août Bretonne, Guillaume Boivin
GP des Marbriers, Keven Lacombe
2011
Stages 4 & 6 Tour de Beauce, Svein Tuft
Canada Road Race Championships, Svein Tuft
Canada Time Trial Championships, Svein Tuft
Grote Prijs Stad Zottegem, Svein Tuft
Univest GP, Ryan Roth
King of the Mountains Classification, Tour of California, Jonathan McCarty
2012
Canada Road Race Championships, Ryan Roth
Tro-Bro Léon, Ryan Roth
Overall Tour of Elk Grove, François Parisien

== National champions ==
2011
Road Race Championships, Svein Tuft
Time Trial Championships, Svein Tuft
U23 Road Race Championships, Hugo Houle
U23 Time Trial Championships, Hugo Houle
2012
Road Race Championships, Ryan Roth
U23 Time Trial Championships, Hugo Houle

== Sponsors ==
Argon 18, Action Wipes, Blackberry, Bunkbreaker, Canada Goose, DZ-Nuts, Finishline, Giro, Gu,
HerbaLife, Hutchinson, Humberview Group, ISM, K-Edge, Oakley, Park Tool, Pearl Izumi, PRO, Shimano, Thule
