= Canadian National Road Race Championships =

National road cycling championship in Canada

The champion's jersey

Governed by Cycling Canada, the Canadian National Road Race Championships is a road bicycle race that takes place as part of the Canadian National Cycling Championships, and decides the best cyclist in this type of race.

The first edition took place in 1959, and was won by Egidio Bolzon. Czeslaw Lukaszewicz holds the record for the most wins in the men's championship with 4. The current champion is Pier-André Côté.

The women's race began in 1974, with France Richer winning the first edition. The women's record is held by Alison Sydor with 4 wins. The current champion is Maggie Coles-Lyster.

== Multiple winners ==
=== Men ===
| Wins | Rider | Years |
|---|---|---|
| 4 | Czeslaw Lukaszewicz | 1994, 1997, 1999, 2000 |
| 3 | Max Grace | 1970, 1971, 1972 |
| 3 | Steve Bauer | 1981, 1982, 1983 |
| 3 | Guillaume Boivin | 2009, 2015, 2021 |
| 2 | Egidio Bolzon | 1959, 1962 |
| 2 | Gervais Rioux | 1985, 1987 |
| 2 | Matthew Anand | 1993, 1995 |
| 2 | Mark Walters | 1998, 2001 |
| 2 | Svein Tuft | 2011, 2014 |

=== Women ===
| Wins | Rider | Years |
|---|---|---|
| 4 | Alison Sydor | 1990, 1991, 1993, 1994 |
| 3 | Linda Jackson | 1995, 1997, 1998 |
| 3 | Karen Ann Strong | 1975, 1976, 1981 |
| 3 | Joëlle Numainville | 2010, 2013, 2015 |
| 2 | Geneviève Brunet | 1984, 1987 |
| 2 | Clara Hughes | 1992, 1999 |
| 2 | Lyne Bessette | 2001, 2004 |
| 2 | Geneviève Jeanson | 2003, 2005 |
| 2 | Alex Wrubleski | 2006, 2008 |

== Men ==
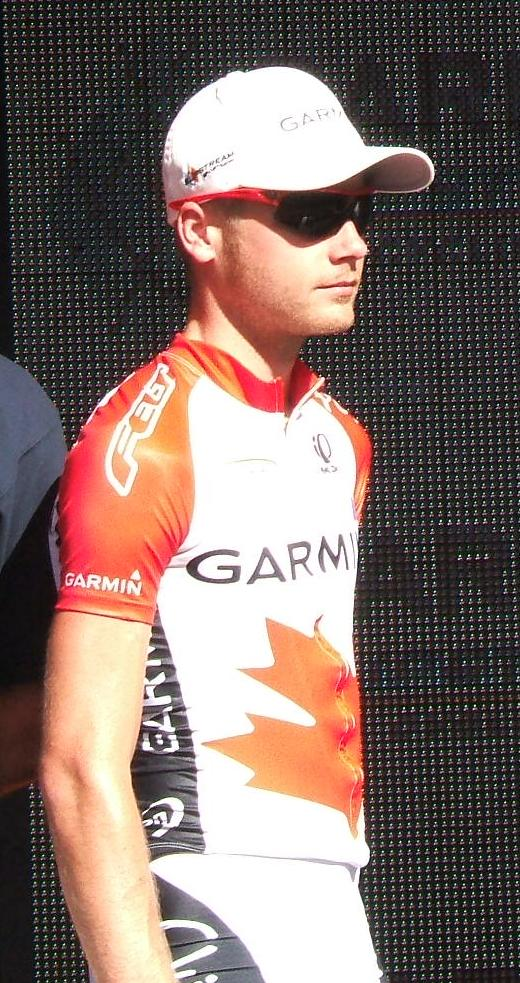
Christian Meier (pictured at the 2009 Tour Down Under) won his only Canadian national road race title in 2008

=== Elite ===
| Year | Gold | Silver | Bronze |
|---|---|---|---|
| 1959 | Egidio Bolzon | Ian Mahon | Roy Williamson |
| 1960 | Alessandro Messina | | |
| 1961 | Not held | | |
| 1962 | Egidio Bolzon | | |
| 1963 | Sammy Watson | | |
| 1964 | Giacomo Segat | Jacques Lepage | |
| 1965 | Not held | | |
| 1966 | Paolo Mori | | |
| 1967 | Stu Mapp | | |
| 1968 | Joe Jones | | |
| 1969 | Horst Stuewe | | |
| 1970 | Max Grace | | |
| 1971 | Max Grace | | |
| 1972 | Max Grace | | |
| 1973 | Norman Lowe | Jocelyn Lovell | Brian Chewter |
| 1974 | Jocelyn Lovell | | |
| 1975 | Brian Keast | Tom Morris | Robert Van den Eynde |
| 1976 | Pierre Harvey | Serge Proulx | Ron Hayman |
| 1977 | Ron Hayman | | |
| 1978 | Normand St-Aubin | | |
| 1979 | Ron Hayman | Pierre Harvey | |
| 1980 | Bernie Willock | | |
| 1981 | Steve Bauer | | |
| 1982 | Steve Bauer | Gerry Dovick | |
| 1983 | Steve Bauer | | |
| 1984 | Andrew Hansen | | |
| 1985 | Gervais Rioux | Alex Stieda | Mark Berger |
| 1986 | Eon D'Ornellas | Martin Barras | John Large |
| 1987 | Gervais Rioux | | |
| 1988 | Brian Walton | | |
| 1989 | P. Rygielski | | |
| 1990 | Colin Davidson | | |
| 1991 | Todd McNutt | | |
| 1992 | Scott Price | Blair Saunders | Steve Rover |
| 1993 | Matthew Anand | | |
| 1994 | Czeslaw Lukaszewicz | Jeff Barnes | |
| 1995 | Matthew Anand | Michael Barry | Jacques Landry |
| 1996 | Steve Rover | Eric Wohlberg | Jean-Sébastien Béland |
| 1997 | Czeslaw Lukaszewicz | Eric Wohlberg | Matthew Anand |
| 1998 | Mark Walters | Brian Walton | Czeslaw Lukaszewicz |
| 1999 | Czeslaw Lukaszewicz | Matthew Anand | Sylvain Beauchamp |
| 2000 | Czeslaw Lukaszewicz | Gordon Fraser | Brian Walton |
| 2001 | Mark Walters | Michael Barry | Min Van Velzen |
| 2002 | Andrew Randell | Dominique Perras | Antoine Varghese |
| 2003 (Note: The Canadian Road Championships were disputed in the Tim Hortons Road National Championships, a UCI 1.5 category race. Dominique Perras, who finished the race in 3rd position, was in fact considered as national champion. The race was actually won by Australia's Nathan O'Neill.) | Dominique Perras | Mark Walters | Eric Wohlberg |
| 2004 | Gordon Fraser | Svein Tuft | Alexandre Lavallée |
| 2005 | François Parisien | Eric Wohlberg | Dominique Perras |
| 2006 | Dominique Rollin | Svein Tuft | Dominique Perras |
| 2007 | Cameron Evans (Cyclist) | Andrew Randell | Dominique Perras |
| 2008 | Christian Meier | Bruno Langlois | Jacob Erker |
| 2009 | Guillaume Boivin | André Tremblay | Andrew Hunt |
| 2010 | Will Routley | Andrew Randell | Bruno Langlois |
| 2011 | Svein Tuft | Will Routley | Zachary Bell |
| 2012 | Ryan Roth | Michael Barry | Marsh Cooper |
| 2013 | Zachary Bell | Ryan Anderson | Rob Britton |
| 2014 | Svein Tuft | Ryan Roth | Christian Meier |
| 2015 | Guillaume Boivin | Ryan Anderson | Ryan Roth |
| 2016 | Bruno Langlois | Ben Perry | Will Routley |
| 2017 | Matteo Dal-Cin | Marc-Antoine Soucy | Pier-André Côté |
| 2018 | Antoine Duchesne | Ben Perry | Nigel Ellsay |
| 2019 | Adam de Vos | Nigel Ellsay | Nickolas Zukowsky |
| 2020 | Not held due to the COVID-19 pandemic in Canada | | |
| 2021 | Guillaume Boivin | Antoine Duchesne | Derek Gee |
| 2022 | Pier-André Côté | Guillaume Boivin | Ben Perry |
| 2023 | Nickolas Zukowsky | Philippe Jacob | Nicolas Rivard |
| 2024 | Michael Woods | Pier-André Côté | Carson Miles |
| 2025 | Derek Gee | Hugo Houle | Michael Leonard |

=== U23 ===
| Year | Gold | Silver | Bronze |
|---|---|---|---|
| 1997 | Michael Barry | Daniel Defranceschi | Guillaume Belzile |
| 1998 | Alexandre Lavallee | Pascal Choquette | Matthew Hansen |
| 1999 | Jonathan Tremblay | Charles Dionne | Martin St-Laurent |
| 2000 | Warnes Maertens | Andrew Pinfold | Pascal Choquette |
| 2001 | Charles Dionne | Peter Sanowar | Jean-François Laroche |
| 2002 | Dominique Rollin | Cory Lange | Martin St-Laurent |
| 2003 | Martin Gilbert | Murray Carter | Cory Jay |
| 2004 | Cameron Evans (Cyclist) | François Parisien | Will Routley |
| 2005 | Ryan Roth | Christian Meier | Keven Lacombe |
| 2006 | David Veilleux | Christian Meier | Jamie Lamb |
| 2007 | Christian Meier | Ryan Anderson | Eric Boily |
| 2008 | | | |
| 2009 | Guillaume Boivin | André Tremblay | Andrew Hunt |
| 2010 | Jesse Reams | Arnaud Papillon | David Boily |
| 2011 | Hugo Houle | Jamie Riggs | Spencer Smitheman |
| 2012 | Antoine Duchesne | David Boily | Hugo Houle |
| 2013 | Antoine Duchesne | Pierrick Naud | Stuart Wight |
| 2014 | Ben Perry | Kris Dahl | Jay Lamoureux |
| 2015 | Ben Perry | Adam de Vos | Alexander Cataford |
| 2016 | Ben Perry | Olivier Brisebois | Nicholas Masbourian |
| 2017 | Marc-Antoine Soucy | Conor O'Brien | Thierry Kirouac-Marcassa |
| 2018 | Edward Walsh | Noah Simms | Connor Toppings |
| 2019 | Nickolas Zukowsky | Derek Gee | Evan Burtnik |
| 2020 | Not held due to the COVID-19 pandemic in Canada | | |
| 2021 | Carson Miles | Thomas Schellenberg | Eric Inkster |
| 2022 | Carson Miles | Nicolas Rivard | Riley Pickrell |

== Women ==
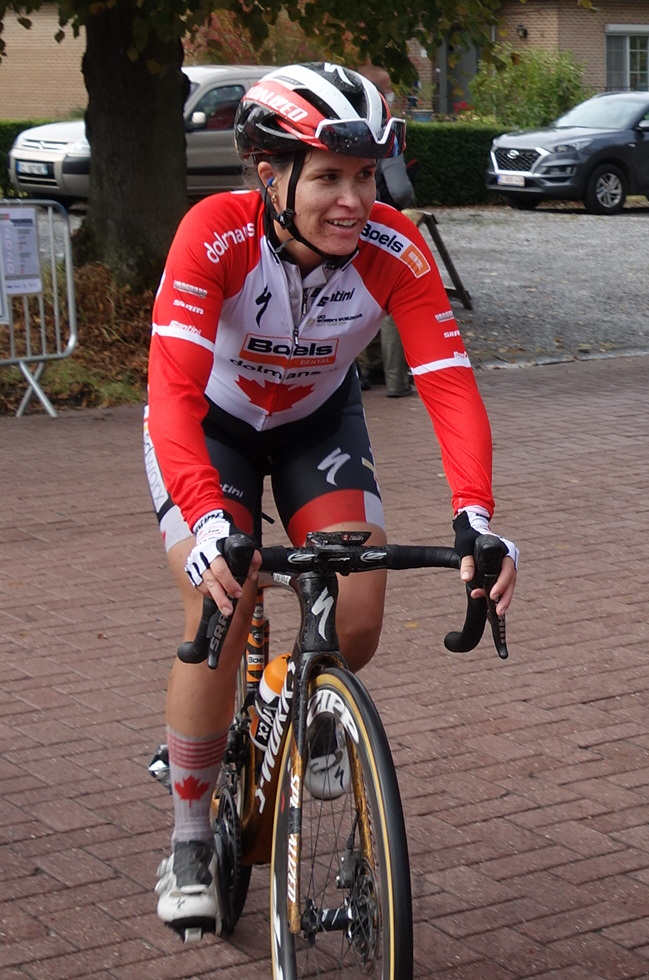
Karol-Ann Canuel (pictured at the 2020 La Flèche Wallonne Féminine) won her only Canadian national road race title in 2019

=== Elite ===
| Year | Gold | Silver | Bronze |
|---|---|---|---|
| 1974 | France Richer | | |
| 1975 | Karen Ann Strong | | |
| 1976 | Karen Ann Strong | Debbie Horbatiuk | Sylvia Burka |
| 1977 | Sylvia Burka | | |
| 1978 | Sylvia Burka | | |
| 1979 | Not held | | |
| 1980 | Sylvia Burka | | |
| 1981 | Karen Ann Strong | | |
| 1982 | Verena Buhler | | |
| 1983 | Marie-Claude Audet | | |
| 1984 | Geneviève Brunet | | |
| 1985 | Barb Lang | | |
| 1986 | Sara-Louise Neil | Barb Lang | |
| 1987 | Geneviève Brunet | | Barb Lang |
| 1988 | Not held | | |
| 1989 | Laurel Zike | | |
| 1990 | Alison Sydor | Maria Hawkins | Sara-Louise Neil |
| 1991 | Alison Sydor | Denise Kelly | Maria Hawkins |
| 1992 | Clara Hughes | Sue Palmer-Komar | Linda Jackson |
| 1993 | Alison Sydor | Clara Hughes | Megan McKenna |
| 1994 | Alison Sydor | Leslie Tomlinson | Clara Hughes |
| 1995 | Linda Jackson | Sue Palmer-Komar | Alison Sydor |
| 1996 | Sue Palmer-Komar | Anne Samplonius | Leigh Hobson |
| 1997 | Linda Jackson | Julia Farell | Sue Palmer-Komar |
| 1998 | Linda Jackson | Alison Sydor | Lyne Bessette |
| 1999 | Clara Hughes | Lyne Bessette | Sandy Espeseth |
| 2000 | Sandy Espeseth | Mélanie Nadeau | Leigh Hobson |
| 2001 | Lyne Bessette | Sandy Espeseth | Geneviève Jeanson |
| 2002 | Katy Saint-Laurent | Julie Pepin | Sandy Espeseth |
| 2003 | Geneviève Jeanson | Lyne Bessette | Sue Palmer-Komar |
| 2004 | Lyne Bessette | Manon Jutras | Erinne Willock |
| 2005 | Geneviève Jeanson | Erinne Willock | Sue Palmer-Komar |
| 2006 | Alex Wrubleski | Anne Samplonius | Leigh Hobson |
| 2007 | Gina Grain | Marni Hambleton | Moriah McGregor |
| 2008 | Alex Wrubleski | Leigh Hobson | Felicia Gómez |
| 2009 | Alison Testroete | Gina Grain | Merrill Collins |
| 2010 | Joëlle Numainville | Tara Whitten | Alison Testroete |
| 2011 | Véronique Fortin | Lex Albrecht | Erinne Willock |
| 2012 | Denise Ramsden | Clara Hughes | Joëlle Numainville |
| 2013 | Joëlle Numainville | Leah Kirchmann | Lex Albrecht |
| 2014 | Leah Kirchmann | Denise Ramsden | Leah Guloien |
| 2015 | Joëlle Numainville | Leah Kirchmann | Jamie Gilgen |
| 2016 | Annie Foreman-Mackey | Joëlle Numainville | Leah Kirchmann |
| 2017 | Allison Beveridge | Kirsti Lay | Alison Jackson |
| 2018 | Katherine Maine | Kinley Gibson | Sara Bergen |
| 2019 | Karol-Ann Canuel | Leah Kirchmann | Ariane Bonhomme |
| 2020 | Not held due to the COVID-19 pandemic in Canada | | |
| 2021 | Alison Jackson | Maghalie Rochette | Sara Poidevin |
| 2022 | Maggie Coles-Lyster | Alison Jackson | Emily Marcolini |
| 2023 | Alison Jackson | Olivia Baril | Simone Boilard |
| 2024 | Olivia Baril | Magdeleine Vallieres | Sarah Van Dam |
| 2025 | Alison Jackson | Alexandra Volstad | Laury Milette |

=== U23 ===
| Year | Gold | Silver | Bronze |
|---|---|---|---|
| 2016 | Ariane Bonhomme | Sara Poidevin | Kinley Gibson |
| 2017 | Catherine Ouellette | Sara Poidevin | Katherine Maine |
| 2018 | Katherine Maine | Callie Swan | Sara Poidevin |
| 2019 | Olivia Baril | Ann-Pascale Ouellet | Gabby Traxler |
| 2020 | Not held due to the COVID-19 pandemic in Canada | | |
| 2021 | Ruby West | Laury Milette | Florence Normand |
| 2022 | Simone Boilard | Laury Milette | Ngaire Barraclough |
