= Louis Garneau =

Canadian racing cyclist (born 1958)

Personal information
- Born: August 9, 1958 (age 68) Quebec City, Quebec, Canada

Cycling career
- Sport: Cycling
- Discipline: Road
- Role: Rider

Louis Garneau (born August 9, 1958, in Sainte-Foy, Quebec, Canada) is a retired competitive cyclist, artist, and businessman of French-Canadian descent.

In 1978, Garneau was the Canadian champion in individual pursuit cycling. In 1983, he founded Louis Garneau Sports, which sells cycling clothing and accessories.

== Early years ==
Garneau was born in Sainte-Foy, Quebec on August 9, 1958, the son of Paul Garneau and Jeannine Lehoux. He obtained his bachelor's degree in visual arts from Laval University and won an excellence scholarship there in 1983.

From 1970 to 1983, Garneau was an international cyclist and won the title of Canadian champion in individual pursuit in 1978. He was selected to participate in the 1980 Moscow Olympics, but could not participate due to the boycott of these games by Canada. After taking part in the 1984 Los Angeles Olympics, he retired from competition.

== Business career ==
In 1983, Garneau began making clothing for cyclists in his father's garage, supported in this project by his wife, Monique Arsenault. The company became Louis Garneau Clothing. In 1984, the company moved to larger premises (140 square meters or 1,500 square feet), then was forced to expand again in 1985, to premises of 464 square meters (5,000 square feet).

In 1988, when the company reached 118 employees, it moved to a building of 2972 square meters (32,000 square feet) in St-Augustin-de-Desmaures. The building was enlarged in 1993 and 1999, with the creation of a distribution centre.

Louis Garneau decided to launch an assault on the American market in 1989, with the opening of the Louis Garneau USA plant in Newport, Vermont, in 1989. This new division initially employed 12 people. The area of the American building will be doubled in 1999.

The Newport, Vermont building no longer sufficient for the company's needs, a major investment will materialize on August 15, 2014, with the inauguration of a new state-of-the-art building in Derby, Vermont, which includes a distribution centre for the American market.

In 2015, the Louis Garneau Sports Inc. employs around 450 people and exports to more than 50 countries. Louis Garneau Sports, which celebrated its 30th anniversary of founding in 2013, holds numerous patents, mainly with the Canadian Intellectual Property Office (CIPO) and the United States Patent and Trademark Office (USPTO), in order to protect its many innovations.

Since 2018, the Garneau Group includes the Canadian trilogy of three brands: Garneau, Sugoi and Sombrio. Their products, intended for cyclists, triathletes, as well as several disciplines of winter sports such as snowshoeing, are sold in more than 40 countries, starting with Canada and the United States.

In March 2020, the company filed for creditor protection, but announced its intention to take the company public in 2023 thanks to e-bike market.

== Cycling team ==
Louis Garneau operated a cycling development team for several years, in order to help young talented cyclists reach their full potential and allow them to pass into the ranks of professional cyclists. Some big name Quebec cyclists who went through this development team are: David Veilleux (first Quebec cyclist to participate in the Tour de France within the professional continental team Europcar), Antoine Duchesne (who joined Europcar in 2014 and is now part of Groupama FDJ), Hugo Houle (a member of the UCI World Tour AG2R La Mondiale team from 2013 and now with Astana-Premier Tech), as well as Canadian Michael Woods (who will start his 2021 season within the UCI World Tour Israel Start-Up Nation cycling team.)

Through conferences and cycling events, Louis Garneau is socially involved with the organization Les Petits Frères, whose committed to relieving isolation and loneliness among the elderly.

On December 22, 2018, Garneau launched the international "Don't Text and Drive" day, in memory of his cycling friend Jason Lowndes, who died on his bike during a training session in Australia, by a distracted driver, on December 22, 2017.

== Top honours as a cyclist ==
- 1975
  - First place at Canadian Junior Team Championship
- 1976
  - Provincial Junior Champion
- 1977
  - Track Cycling Canada Championships | Team Pursuit Canada Championship
- 1978
  - Track Cycling Canada Championships | Canadian Champion in Individual Pursuit
  - Quebec Team Pursuit Championship
- 1979
  - Canadian Road Cycling Championships | Canadian Time Trial Champion
  - Grand Prix Cycliste de Montréal
  - Marc Blouin Grand Prix
  - Grand Prix de Sutton
  - Critérium de Verdun
- 1980
  - Maine International Bicycle Race
  - Vancouver Criterium
  - Canada Week Grand Prix
- 1981
  - Grand Prix de Lévis
  - Tour de la Gaspésie
  - Grand Prix cycliste de Beauport
  - Sherbrooke Award
  - Canada Week Awards
  - Price Italian Super Prestige
  - Grand Prix Terre des Hommes
  - Critérium de Contrecœur
- 1982
  - Canada Week Awards
  - Provincial Road Championship
- 1983
  - Fitchburg Longsjo Classic
  - Ocean Gate Tower
  - Hartford Criterium
  - Lebanon Grand Prix

He competed in the individual road race event at the 1984 Summer Olympics.

== Honours ==
- 1990 – Raymond-Blais Medal
- 1997 – Chevalier de l'Ordre national du Québec
- 1999 – Officer of the Order of Canada
- 2007 – Honorary Doctorate from the University of Ottawa
- 2012 – Queen Elizabeth II's Diamond Jubilee Medal
- 2014 – Recipient of the Medal of Honour of the Quebec National Assembly
- 2015 – Recipient of one of 50 Canadian flags awarded by the Prime Minister to 50 deserving Canadians on the occasion of the 150th anniversary of the Maple Leaf
