= Jaime Ramírez =

Jaime Ramírez may refer to:

- Jaime Ramírez (footballer, 1931-2003), Chilean football winger
- Jaime Ramírez (police officer) (1940-1986), official of the National Police of Colombia
- Jaime Ramírez (footballer, born 1967), Chilean football midfielder
- Jaime Ramírez (cyclist) (born 1989), Colombian cyclist
