= Phil Cortes =

Canadian racing cyclist

Personal information
- Born: April 21, 1982 (age 44) Campbellton, New Brunswick, Canada

Cycling career
- Sport: Cycling
- Discipline: Road
- Role: Rider

Professional teams
- 2004: (Canada) Italpasta - Transport Belmire (ITB)
- 2007: (Canada) Calyon - Litespeed Pro Cycling Team (CAL)
- 2008: (Poland) Amore & Vita–McDonald's (AMO)
- 2009: (United States) Amore & Vita–McDonald's (AMO)

Managerial team
- 2012–: (Canada) Garneau Quebecor

Phil Cortes (born April 21, 1982 in Campbellton, New Brunswick, Canada) is a Canadian racing cyclist.

In 2012, he is the directeur Sportif for Garneau Quebecor, a Canadian cycling team. That same year, Phil Cortes led his team to the Tour de Guadeloupe, with rider Bruno Langlois ranking second in the final general classification.

== Palmares ==
2006
• 3rd : à Classic Chlorophylle (CAN)
• 1st : à Bear Mountain Spring Classic NY (USA)
• 1st Stage 1 : Tobago International (TRD)
• 2nd Stage 3 : Tobago International (TRD)
• 3rd General Classification : Tobago International (TRD)
2008
• 1st Stage 6 : Vuelta a Costa Rica, Guápiles (CRC)
2009
• 2nd Stage 2 : Tour de Beauce, Thetford (CAN)
