= 2010 UCI Road World Championships – Men's under-23 road race =

Men's under-23 road race
2010 UCI Road World Championships
- Rainbow jersey

Race details
- Dates: 1 October 2010
- Stages: 1
- Distance: 159 km (98.80 mi)
- Winning time: 4h 01' 23"

Medalists
	Gold	Michael Matthews (Australia)
	Silver	John Degenkolb (Germany)
	Bronze	two bronze medals

The Men's under-23 road race of the 2010 UCI Road World Championships cycling event took place on 1 October in Melbourne, Australia.

Home rider Michael Matthews claimed Australia's first gold medal of the championships by winning the sprint finish at the end of the race, outsprinting Germany's John Degenkolb, who took silver. Time trial champion Taylor Phinney and Guillaume Boivin of Canada shared the bronze medal after Tissot's photo finish system could not split the riders. Phinney became the sixth rider to medal in both the time trial and the road race in the under-23s category.

== Route ==
The race covered 159 km.

== Final classification ==
Rank	Rider	Time
1	(Australia) Michael Matthews (AUS)	4h 01' 23"
2	(Germany) John Degenkolb (GER)	s.t.
3	(United States) Taylor Phinney (USA)	s.t.
3	(Canada) Guillaume Boivin (CAN)	s.t.
5	(France) Arnaud Démare (FRA)	s.t.
6	(Italy) Sonny Colbrelli (ITA)	s.t.
7	(Belgium) Laurens De Vreese (BEL)	s.t.
8	(Denmark) Sebastian Lander (DEN)	s.t.
9	(Spain) Juan José Lobato (ESP)	s.t.
10	(Russia) Vyacheslav Kuznetsov (RUS)	s.t.
11	(United Kingdom) Luke Rowe (GBR)	s.t.
12	(Belarus) Siarhei Papok (BLR)	s.t.
13	(Slovenia) Blaz Jarc (SLO)	s.t.
14	(Lithuania) Ramūnas Navardauskas (LTU)	s.t.
15	(Italy) Stefano Agostini (ITA)	s.t.
16	(Canada) David Boily (CAN)	s.t.
17	(Poland) Sylwester Janiszewski (POL)	s.t.
18	(Spain) Mikel Landa (ESP)	s.t.
19	(Venezuela) Yonathan Monsalve (VEN)	s.t.
20	(Lithuania) Egidijus Juodvalkis (LTU)	s.t.
21	(Canada) Arnaud Papillon (CAN)	s.t.
22	(Belgium) Yannick Eijssen (BEL)	s.t.
23	(Portugal) Nélson Oliveira (POR)	s.t.
24	(Austria) Georg Preidler (AUT)	s.t.
25	(Italy) Massimo Graziato (ITA)	s.t.
26	(Poland) Rafał Majka (POL)	s.t.
27	(New Zealand) George Bennett (NZL)	s.t.
28	(Russia) Dmitriy Ignatyev (RUS)	s.t.
29	(Sweden) Sebastian Balck (SWE)	s.t.
30	(Norway) Vegard Stake Laengen (NOR)	s.t.
31	(Luxembourg) Joel Zangerle (LUX)	s.t.
32	(Slovenia) Blaz Furdi (SLO)	s.t.
33	(Russia) Arkimedes Arguelyes (RUS)	s.t.
34	(Hong Kong) Ki Ho Choi (HKG)	s.t.
35	(Netherlands) Tom Jelte Slagter (NED)	s.t.
36	(Slovenia) Andi Bajc (SLO)	s.t.
37	(Austria) Daniel Schorn (AUT)	s.t.
38	(Colombia) Carlos Betancur (COL)	s.t.
39	(Sweden) Tobias Ludvigsson (SWE)	s.t.
40	(Spain) Jesus Herrada López (ESP)	s.t.
41	(Poland) Piotr Gawronski (POL)	s.t.
42	(Colombia) Eduard Alexander Beltran (COL)	s.t.
43	(Poland) Adrian Honkisz (POL)	s.t.
44	(Spain) Higinio Fernandez (ESP)	s.t.
45	(France) Romain Hardy (FRA)	s.t.
46	(Hong Kong) Ho Ting Kwok (HKG)	s.t.
47	(Belarus) Kanstantsin Klimiankou (BLR)	+ 28"
48	(Hong Kong) Ying Hon Yeung (HKG)	+ 28"
49	(Italy) Enrico Battaglin (ITA)	+ 42"
50	(France) Tony Gallopin (FRA)	+ 46"
51	(Denmark) Jimmi Sorensen (DEN)	+ 1' 04"
52	(Australia) Malcolm Rudolph (AUS)	+ 1' 04"
53	(Poland) Paweł Poljański (POL)	+ 1' 04"
54	(Colombia) Javier Gómez (COL)	+ 1' 04"
55	(Norway) Vegard Robinson Bugge (NOR)	+ 1' 04"
56	(United Kingdom) Jonathan McEvoy (GBR)	+ 1' 04"
57	(Switzerland) Sébastien Reichenbach (SUI)	+ 1' 04"
58	(United States) Chris Butler (USA)	+ 1' 04"
59	(Belgium) Julien Vermote (BEL)	+ 1' 04"
60	(Belgium) Jelle Wallays (BEL)	+ 1' 04"
61	(Eritrea) Daniel Teklehaimanot (ERI)	+ 1' 04"

Rank	Rider	Time
62	(Denmark) Christopher Juul Jensen (DEN)	+ 2' 01"
63	(Australia) Joseph Lewis (AUS)	+ 2' 22"
64	(United States) Alex Howes (USA)	+ 2' 22"
65	(New Zealand) Shem Rodger (NZL)	+ 2' 40"
66	(Kazakhstan) Arman Kamyshev (KAZ)	+ 2' 40"
67	(Kazakhstan) Vladislav Gorbunov (KAZ)	+ 2' 40"
68	(Kazakhstan) Daniil Fominykh (KAZ)	+ 2' 40"
69	(France) Jean-Lou Paiani (FRA)	+ 2' 40"
70	(Japan) Yoshimitsu Hiratsuka (JPN)	+ 2' 40"
71	(Netherlands) Ronan van Zandbeek (NED)	+ 2' 50"
72	(Colombia) Julián David Arredondo (COL)	+ 3' 07"
73	(Austria) Andreas Hofer (AUT)	+ 3' 13"
74	(Germany) Michel Koch (GER)	+ 3' 13"
75	(Russia) Alexei Tsatevitch (RUS)	+ 3' 13"
76	(Australia) Rohan Dennis (AUS)	+ 3' 13"
77	(Poland) Michał Kwiatkowski (POL)	+ 3' 13"
78	(Germany) Philipp Ries (GER)	+ 3' 13"
79	(Netherlands) Boy van Poppel (NED)	+ 5' 30"
80	(Netherlands) Tom Dumoulin (NED)	+ 5' 30"
81	(Slovenia) Marko Kump (SLO)	+ 5' 30"
82	(Austria) Matthias Krizek (AUT)	+ 5' 35"
83	(Argentina) Enzo Moyano (ARG)	+ 5' 39"
84	(Estonia) Silver Schultz (EST)	+ 5' 40"
85	(Italy) Moreno Moser (ITA)	+ 5' 46"
86	(France) Geoffrey Soupe (FRA)	+ 6' 04"
87	(Serbia) Jovan Zekavica (SRB)	+ 8' 52"
88	(Belarus) Andrei Krasilnikau (BLR)	+ 10' 07"
89	(Portugal) Marco Sérgio Dias Coelho (POR)	+ 10' 07"
90	(Portugal) Domingos Andre Maciel Gonçalves (POR)	+ 10' 07"
91	(Slovenia) Luka Mezgec (SLO)	+ 10' 07"
92	(Belgium) Arthur Van Overberghe (BEL)	+ 10' 07"
93	(Canada) Hugo Houle (CAN)	+ 12' 38"
94	(Turkey) Recep Ünalan (TUR)	+ 16' 40"
95	(Lithuania) Evaldas Šiškevičius (LTU)	+ 17' 12"
96	(Norway) Daniel Egeland Jarstø (NOR)	+ 21' 32"
97	(Hong Kong) King Lok Cheung (HKG)	+ 21' 32"
	(Germany) David Hesselbarth (GER)	DNF
	(Germany) Maximilian May (GER)	DNF
	(Australia) Luke Durbridge (AUS)	DNF
	(Netherlands) Coen Vermeltfoort (NED)	DNF
	(Netherlands) Pim Ligthart (NED)	DNF
	(Australia) Ben King (AUS)	DNF
	(Portugal) Fábio Silvestre (POR)	DNF
	(Japan) Ryohei Komori (JPN)	DNF
	(Japan) Kohei Uchima (JPN)	DNF
	(Argentina) Daniel Diaz (ARG)	DNF
	(Slovenia) Jan Tratnik (SLO)	DNF
	(United Kingdom) Alex Dowsett (GBR)	DNF
	(United Kingdom) Andrew Fenn (GBR)	DNF
	(United States) Ben King (USA)	DNF
	(France) Johan Le Bon (FRA)	DNF
	(Norway) Øystein Stake Laengen (NOR)	DNF
	(Denmark) Rasmus Christian Quaade (DEN)	DNF
	(Switzerland) Silvan Dillier (SUI)	DNF
	(Switzerland) Michaël Baer (SUI)	DNF
	(New Zealand) Michael Vink (NZL)	DNF
	(United States) Andrew Talansky (USA)	DNF
	(Russia) Nikita Novikov (RUS)	DNF
	(Argentina) Ariel Sivori (ARG)	DNF
	(Slovakia) Martin Mahdar (SVK)	DNF
	(United States) Carter Jones (USA)	DNF
