= Emile Abraham =

Trinidad and Tobago cyclist

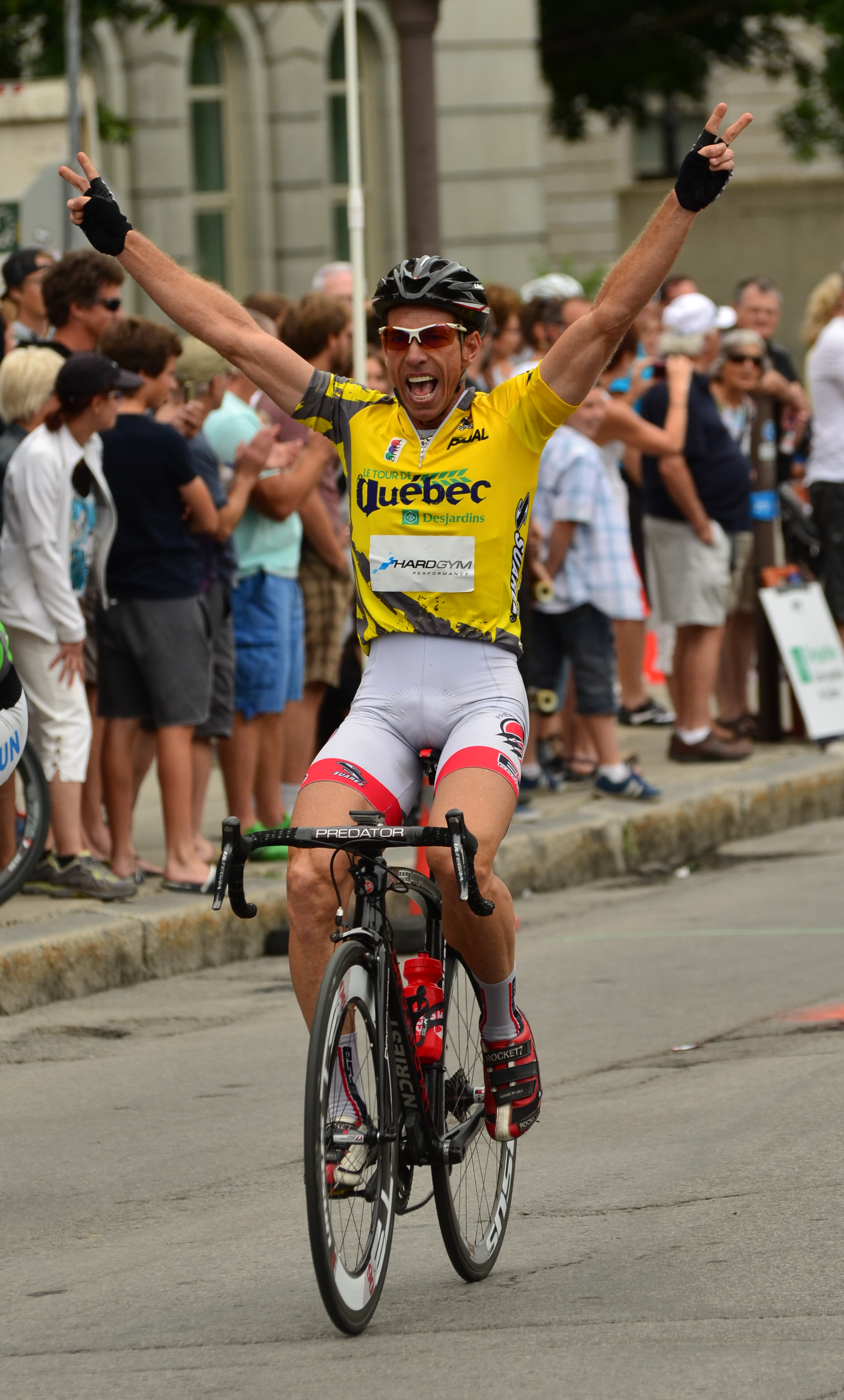
- Abraham at the 2013 Tour de Québec

Personal information
- Born: 28 April 1974 (age 52) Scarborough, Tobago

Cycling career
- Sport: Cycling
- Current team: NGCA Elite p/b Tyler Perry Studios
- Discipline: Road
- Role: Rider

Amateur teams
- 2013–2014: Predator Carbon Repair
- 2015: Texas Roadhouse
- 2016: UnitedHealthcare of Georgia–706P
- 2017–: NGCA Elite
- 2019: Team Pharmaco

Professional teams
- 2003: Team Maestro–Nella
- 2004–2005: Team Monex
- 2006: AEG–Toshiba–JetNetwork Pro Cycling Team
- 2007: Priority Health–Bissell
- 2008: Team Type 1
Medal record
Men's cycling
Representing Trinidad and Tobago
Pan American Games
Silver medal – second place	2007 Rio de Janeiro	Road race

Emile Abraham (born 28 April 1974) is a professional cyclist from Trinidad and Tobago. He won the silver medal in the men's individual road race at the 2007 Pan American Games, just behind Dominican Republic's Wendy Cruz. In 2017 he won the USA Masters National road cycling championships and a bronze medal in the Masters World Track Championships in the points race in Los Angeles. He has been arrested for a sexual crime, and banned from USA Cycling events.

== Major results ==
1999
1st Stage 1 Vuelta a la Independencia Nacional
2000
2nd Overall Tour de Martinique
3rd Overall Tour do Rio
2001
1st Overall Tobago Cycling Classic
1st Stage 4 Ronde van Vlaams-Brabant
2002
1st Overall Tobago Cycling Classic
2003
1st Overall Tobago Cycling Classic

1st Stages 4 & 5

2004
2nd Athens Twilight Criterium
3rd Overall Tobago Cycling Classic

1st Stage 2

3rd Overall International Cycling Classic

1st Stage 5

2005
1st Stage 2 Joe Martin Stage Race
2006
1st Road race, National Road Championships
2nd Overall Tobago Cycling Classic

1st Stage 5

6th Road race, Central American and Caribbean Games
7th Lancaster Classic
2007
2nd Road race, Pan American Games
2008
3rd Overall Tobago Cycling Classic

1st Stage 5

2009
1st Clásico San Antonio de Padua
2nd Carolina Cup
2010
2nd Road race, Central American and Caribbean Games
2011
1st Road race, National Road Championships
2012
2nd Harlem Skyscraper Classic
3rd Athens Twilight Criterium
2013
National Road Championships

1st Road race
1st Time trial

1st Overall Tour de Québec

1st Stages 1, 2 & 4

1st Overall Tour of Trinidad and Tobago

1st Stage 2

2015
8th Road race, Pan American Games
2019
1st Criterium, National Road Championships
