= Pierrick Naud =

Canadian bicycle racer

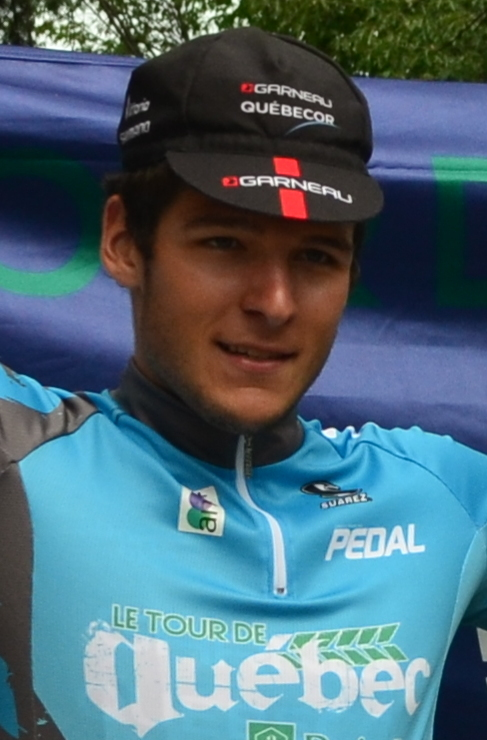
- Naud in 2013.

Personal information
- Full name: Pierrick Naud
- Born: January 26, 1991 (age 35) Amos, Quebec, Canada

Cycling career
- Sport: Cycling
- Current team: Retired
- Discipline: Road
- Role: Rider

Amateur team
- 2010–2011: Rocky Mountain–CIBC Wood Gundy

Professional teams
- 2012: Ekoi.com–Gaspésien
- 2013–2014: Team Québecor Garneau
- 2015–2017: Optum–Kelly Benefit Strategies

Pierrick Naud (born January 26, 1991) is a Canadian former cyclist, who competed professionally between 2012 and 2017 for the Ekoi.com–Gaspésien, Garneau–Québecor and Rally Cycling teams.

== Major results ==
2008
5th Overall Coupe des Nations Abitibi
2013
Canada Summer Games

1st Road race
1st Criterium

2nd Tour de Québec
2014
1st Stage 4 Redlands Bicycle Classic
2nd Overall Grand Prix Cycliste de Saguenay
3rd White Spot / Delta Road Race
2015
6th Overall Grand Prix Cycliste de Saguenay

1st Stage 3

2016
9th Overall Grand Prix Cycliste de Saguenay
