= James Piccoli =

Canadian cyclist

Personal information
- Born: 5 September 1991 (age 35) Montreal, Quebec, Canada
- Height: 1.78 m (5 ft 10 in)
- Weight: 65 kg (143 lb)

Cycling career
- Sport: Cycling
- Current team: China Anta–Mentech Cycling Team
- Discipline: Road
- Role: Rider
- Rider type: Climber

Amateur teams
- 2013: Medique
- 2016: Transports Lacombe–Devinci–Zoom Media
- 2017: Pacific Premier Bank Pro Cycling

Professional teams
- 2014: Amore & Vita–Selle SMP
- 2015: H&R Block Pro Cycling
- 2017–2019: Elevate–KHS Pro Cycling
- 2020–2022: Israel Start-Up Nation
- 2023: China Glory Continental Cycling Team

James Piccoli (born 5 September 1991) is a Canadian professional road racing cyclist, who currently rides for UCI Continental team China Anta–Mentech Cycling Team. In October 2020, he was named in the startlist for the 2020 Vuelta a España.

Piccoli rose to prominence in 2018, becoming dominant on the North American circuit, winning the Tour de Beauce, and finishing second overall at the 2019 Tour of Utah in addition to winning the prologue stage. These successes allowed him to sign with Israel Start-Up Nation. He stayed with the team through the 2022 season, before confirming that he would not return for 2023, and has not yet announced his plans for the 2023 season.

== Major results ==
2013
Canada Summer Games

2nd Road race
3rd Time trial

2015
3rd Mount Washington Auto Road Bicycle Hillclimb
2016
1st Tobago Cycling Classic
2017
1st Overall Tour of Southland

1st Stage 4

2nd Overall Valley of the Sun Stage Race
9th Overall Tour of Alberta
10th Overall Tour of Utah
2018
1st Overall Tour de Beauce

1st Stage 4

6th Overall Tour of the Gila
7th Overall Colorado Classic
2019
2nd Overall Tour of Utah

1st Prologue

2nd Overall Tour de Beauce

1st Stage 2

2nd Overall Tour de Taiwan

1st Stage 4

5th Road race, National Road Championships
2020
10th Overall Tour de Hongrie
2021
1st Stage 1b (TTT) Settimana Internazionale di Coppi e Bartali
2nd Overall Tour du Rwanda
8th Overall Vuelta a Andalucía
2022
8th Overall Sibiu Cycling Tour
2023
2nd Syedra Ancient City
3rd Overall Tour of Hainan

1st Stage 3

5th Time trial, National Road Championships
9th Overall Tour of Poyang Lake

1st Mountains classification

10th Overall Tour of Huangshan
10th Overall Aziz Shusha

=== Grand Tour general classification results timeline ===
Grand Tour	2020	2021
Giro d'Italia	—	—
Tour de France	—	—
Vuelta a España	125	86

Legend
—	Did not compete
DNF	Did not finish
