= Laurence Harvey (disambiguation) =

Laurence Harvey was a Lithuanian-born South African-bred English actor

Laurence, Lawrence or Larry Harvey may also refer to:

== Sports ==
- Laurence Harvey (cycling), participated in cycling at the 2013 Canada Summer Games
- Lawrence Harvey (rugby union) (c.1876 - c.1953), Scotland player
- Lawrence Harvey (footballer) (born 1972), Turks and Caicos footballer

== Others ==
- Laurence R. Harvey, English actor (born 1970)
- Larry Harvey, artist and Burning Man Festival co-founder
- Larry Harvey (American Horror Story), character
- Larry Harvey (musician) in Academy of Canadian Cinema and Television Award for Best Achievement in Music – Original Song
