= Leigh Hobson =

Canadian cyclist (born 1970)

Personal information
- Full name: Leigh Shawna Hobson
- Born: August 10, 1970 (age 56) Kitchener, Ontario, Canada
- Height: 1.65 m (5 ft 5 in)
- Weight: 55 kg (121 lb)

Cycling career
- Sport: Cycling
- Current team: Retired
- Discipline: Road
- Role: Rider

Professional teams
- 1999: Charles Schwab – Flexiblock
- 2000: Charles Schwab
- 2006: Victory Brewing
- 2007–2008: Cheerwine Cycling Team

Leigh Shawna Hobson (born August 10, 1970 in Kitchener, Ontario) is a Canadian retired professional road cyclist. She represented her nation Canada, as a 37-year-old, at the 2008 Summer Olympics, and also placed third in the women's elite category at the Canadian Championships (1996, 2000, and 2006). Hobson also mounted first-place finishes at the Tri-Peak Challenge in 2006, and at the fourth stage of Tour of the Gila in Silver City, New Mexico in 2008.

Hobson qualified for the Canadian squad in the women's road race at the 2008 Summer Olympics in Beijing by claiming the bronze medal and receiving one of the nation's three berths from the UCI World Cup. She successfully produced her birthday reward and a best possible result for Canada women's cycling team with a seventeenth-place effort in 3:32:52, finishing behind the host nation's Gao Min by less than an inch stretch.

== Career highlights ==
1996
3rd Canadian Championships (Road)
2000
3rd Canadian Championships (Road)
3rd Overall, Redlands Bicycle Classic, United States

3rd Stage 3

2005
3rd Stage 7, Tour de Toona, United States
2006
3rd Overall, Tri-Peaks Challenge, United States

1st Stage 2

3rd Canadian Championships (Road)
2007
2nd Overall, Tour of New Zealand, New Zealand

3rd Stage 4

2nd Overall, Sequoia Cycling Classic, United States
2nd Stage 4, Tri-Peaks Challenge, United States
3rd Canadian Championships (Road)
3rd Stage 1, Joe Martin Stage Race, United States
2008
2nd Canadian Championships (Road)
2nd Overall, Tour de Leelanau, United States
2nd Overall, Tour of the Gila, United States

1st Stage 5
3rd Stage 1

2nd Stage 6, Nature Valley Grand Prix, Stillwater, Minnesota (USA)
2nd Stage 4, Redlands Bicycle Classic, United States
3rd Stage 2, Redlands Bicycle Classic, United States
17th Olympic Games, Beijing (CHN)
