= Erinne Willock =

Canadian cyclist (born 1981)

Personal information
- Born: 16 October 1981 (age 44) Saanich, British Columbia, Canada
- Height: 1.62 m (5 ft 4 in)
- Weight: 50 kg (110 lb)

Cycling career
- Sport: Cycling
- Current team: TIBCO-To-The-Top
- Discipline: Road
- Role: Rider, time-trialist

Professional teams
- 2003–2004: Team Rona Esker
- 2005–2010: Webcor Builders Cycling Team
- 2011–: TIBCO-To-The-Top

Major wins
- San Dimas Stage Race (2005); Joe Martin Stage Race (2006)
Medal record
Women's road bicycle racing
Representing Canada
Pan American Championships
Silver medal – second place	2006 São Paulo	Time trial

Erinne Willock (born October 16, 1981 in Saanich, British Columbia) is a Canadian professional road cyclist. She represented Canada at the 2008 Summer Olympics, and also claimed a silver medal in the women's time trial at the 2006 Pan American Road and Track Championships in Valencia, Venezuela. Willock currently races for TIBCO-To-The-Top pro cycling team since she joined in 2011.

== Professional career ==
Born and raised in Victoria, British Columbia, Willock was introduced to the sport at age fourteen under the guidance and mentoring of her father, Martin Willock, who previously raced for Canada in the men's team time trial at the 1984 Summer Olympics in Los Angeles. Her uncle Bernie Willock, the 1980 Canadian road champion, was set to represent the same nation at the Olympic Games in Moscow before his team joined the US-led boycott.

Willock started out in track cycling and mountain biking, until she shifted to road racing at her elite level. She first joined Team Rona Esker in 2003, and has landed top three places at the Canadian Championships and at the International Tour de Toona in eastern United States. Willock's career flourished when she rode for the United States' Webcor Builders Cycling Team from 2005 to 2010. Followed by two successful pro seasons, Willock delivered her best results in the entire sporting career with a silver medal in the women's road race at the 2006 Pan American Road and Track Championships in Valencia, Venezuela, and a top twenty finish at the 2007 UCI World Championships in Stuttgart, Germany.

Continuing her family's Olympic tradition, Willock qualified for the Canadian squad in the women's road race at the 2008 Summer Olympics in Beijing by receiving the nation's third and final berth from the UCI World Cup. She successfully completed a grueling race with a thirty-seventh-place effort in 3:33:23, surpassing Australia's Sara Carrigan by a scanty, two-second gap.

In 2009, Willock scored a career-high, seventh place as the top North American cyclist in the 124-km women's road race at the UCI World Championships in Mendrisio, Switzerland.

Following the end of the 2010 season, Willock announced that she would leave Webcor Builders for the TIBCO-To-The-Top pro cycling team under a bi-annual contract. On January 10, 2012, Willock also decided to put her Olympic bid on hold, as she and her husband Tony Zarsadias, a professional road cyclist, were expecting to have their first newborn child shortly before the Olympic Games in London.

== Career highlights ==
2002 – where she won her very very first race ever anywhere – Hartford, CT criterium riding for then top ranked (and steroid free) USA cycling team – Verizon Wireless presented by Cervelo https://www.bikereg.com/Results/s/15543/hartford-downtown-criterium Pro/1/2/3 Women 1 Erinne Willock Verizon Wireless-Cervelo 49:56

after having come in second only two weeks prior to the multi time (and future Verizon Wireless rider) Laura Van Gilder at the iconic Bear Mountain race just outside NYC https://www.bikereg.com/Results/s/15540/bear-mountain-spring-classic Women 1/2/3 32 Starters 56 Miles 1 Laura Van Gilder Trek Plus 2 Erinne Willock Verizon Wireless

and the day before... second again https://www.bikereg.com/Results/s/15539/sterling-classic

Women 1/2/3 40m winning time = 1:42:16 42 racers competed

1. Yvonne Ilton Verizon Wireless – Cervelo 2. Erinne Willock Verizon Wireless – Cervelo

2003
2nd Stage 5, Tour de Toona, United States
2004
3rd Canadian Championships (Road), Kamloops, British Columbia (CAN)
3rd Overall, Tour de Toona, United States

3rd Stage 1
3rd Stage 6

2005
1st Overall, San Dimas Stage Race, United States

1st Stage 2

2nd Canadian Championships (Road), Kamloops, British Columbia (CAN)
2006
1st Overall, Joe Martin Stage Race, United States

1st Stage 3

2nd Pan American Road and Track Championships (ITT), Valencia (VEN)
3rd Overall, Tour of the Gila, United States

2nd Stage 2, Mogollon, New Mexico
3rd Stage 1, Tyrone, New Mexico

2007
3rd Stage 5, Tour de l'Ardeche, France
17th UCI World Championships (Road), Stuttgart (GER)
2008
3rd Overall, Tour of New Zealand, New Zealand
37th Olympic Games (Road), Beijing (CHN)
2009
3rd Stage 1, Nature Valley Grand Prix, St. Paul, Minnesota
3rd Stage 1, Joe Martin Stage Race, United States
7th UCI World Championships (Road), Mendrisio (SUI)
2010
3rd Overall, Cascade Cycling Classic, United States

1st Stage 2
3rd Stage 3

8th Overall, GP Ouest-France, France
9th Stage 5, Holland Ladies Tour, Rijssen (NED)
2011
3rd Canadian Championships (Road), Toronto (CAN)
5th Overall, GP Ouest-France, France

== Personal life ==
Willock is the daughter of Martin Willock, who competed at the 1984 Summer Olympics. Her uncle Bernie Willock was scheduled to compete at the 1980 Summer Olympics, until Canada joined the boycott of that event.
