= San Francisco Grand Prix =

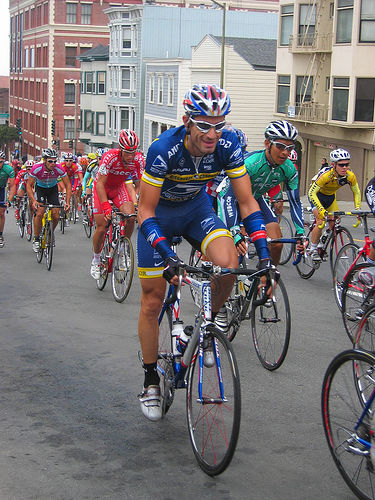
- George Hincapie during 2004 San Francisco Grand Prix

Race details
- Date: Early-September
- Region: California, United States
- English name: San Francisco Grand Prix
- Local name(s): San Francisco Grand Prix (in English)
- Discipline: Road race
- Competition: UCI America Tour
- Type: Single-day
- Web site: www.sanfrangrandprix.com

History
- First edition: 2001
- Editions: 5
- Final edition: 2005
- First winner: George Hincapie (USA)
- Most wins: Charles Dionne (cyclist) (CAN) (2 times)
- Final winner: Fabian Wegmann (GER)

The San Francisco Grand Prix was a road cycling race held in San Francisco, United States in early September. It was as a 1.HC event and in 2005 part of the UCI America Tour. It lasted five years.

The difficulties were the Fillmore and Taylor street climbs, short but steep, both an average 18% forcing riders to weave to get to the top. A month after the 2005 race plans for 2006 were abandoned because of economic and political problems.

== Winners ==
Year	Country	Rider	Team
2001	United States	George Hincapie	US Postal Service
2002	Canada	Charles Dionne	7Up – Nutra Fig
2003	United States	Chris Horner	Saturn
2004	Canada	Charles Dionne	Webcor
2005	Germany	Fabian Wegmann	Gerolsteiner
