= Bernie Willock =

Canadian cyclist and businessman

Personal information
- Born: Victoria, British Columbia, Canada

Cycling career
- Sport: Cycling
- Discipline: Road racing

Major wins
- 1980 Canadian Championships
Medal record
Men's road bicycle racing
Canadian National Road Race Championships
Gold medal – first place	1980	Road race
Pan American Games
Representing Canada
Bronze medal – third place	1979 Puerto Rico	Team time trial

Bernard Willock is a Canadian businessman and former cyclist. Willock has worked as the President and CEO of Food for the Hungry Canada, and owned La-Z-Boy licensed furniture stores. As a cyclist, Willock won the 1980 Canadian National Road Race Championships, and was part of the Canadian team that came third in the team time trial event at the 1979 Pan American Games. He was scheduled to compete at the 1980 Summer Olympics, until Canada joined the boycott of the event, and competed at the 1982 Commonwealth Games.

== Cycling career ==
Willock was a member of Victoria Wheelers cycling club. Willock was part of the Canadian team, alongside Eon D'Ornellas, Pierre Harvey and Normand St-Aubin, that came third in the team time trial event at the 1979 Pan American Games. In 1980, Willock won the Canadian National Road Race Championships. He was in the British Columbian team that came second in the Canadian Provincial 100 km team time trial. British Columbia lost the race's lead to Quebec after being incorrectly directed by the course motorbikes, which led to a 2.5 miles (4.0 km) diversion.

Willock qualified to compete in the road race and team time trial events at the 1980 Summer Olympics in Moscow, USSR. In June 1980, Canada joined the 1980 Summer Olympics boycott, and so Willock was unable to attend the Games. Willock was critical of the boycott, saying that the only outcome of it was the retaliatory 1984 Summer Olympics boycott. In 1981, Willock won the Whistler two-day 220 km cycle race, finishing ahead of his brother Martin. He was also part of the British Columbian team that won the 1981 Canadian Provincial 100 km team time trial, and also came fifth at that year's Gastown Grand Prix.

Willock was part of the Canadian team that came seventh in the team event at the 1982 UCI Track Cycling World Championships in Leicester, England, and eleventh at the team time trial event at the 1982 UCI Road World Championships. He competed in the team time trial event at the 1982 Commonwealth Games, Australia, where Canada finished sixth.

Willock retired from cycling after the 1982 Commonwealth Games. He later coached his brother Martin, and was also a coach at the Victoria Wheelers club. In 1988, he returned to cycling on a casual basis.

== Business career ==
In 1999, Willock and a friend set up a La-Z-Boy licensed furniture store in Victoria. They later opened another store in Nanaimo in 2003. In 2011, Willock retired from the furniture business and sold his shares in the stores. In 2014, Willock became the President and CEO of Food for the Hungry Canada.

== Personal life ==
Willock is from Victoria, British Columbia, Canada. He is the brother of Martin Willock who competed for Canada in the team time trial event at the 1984 Summer Olympics. His niece Erinne Willock competed at the 2008 Summer Olympics.
