= Guillaume Boivin =

Canadian cyclist (born 1989)

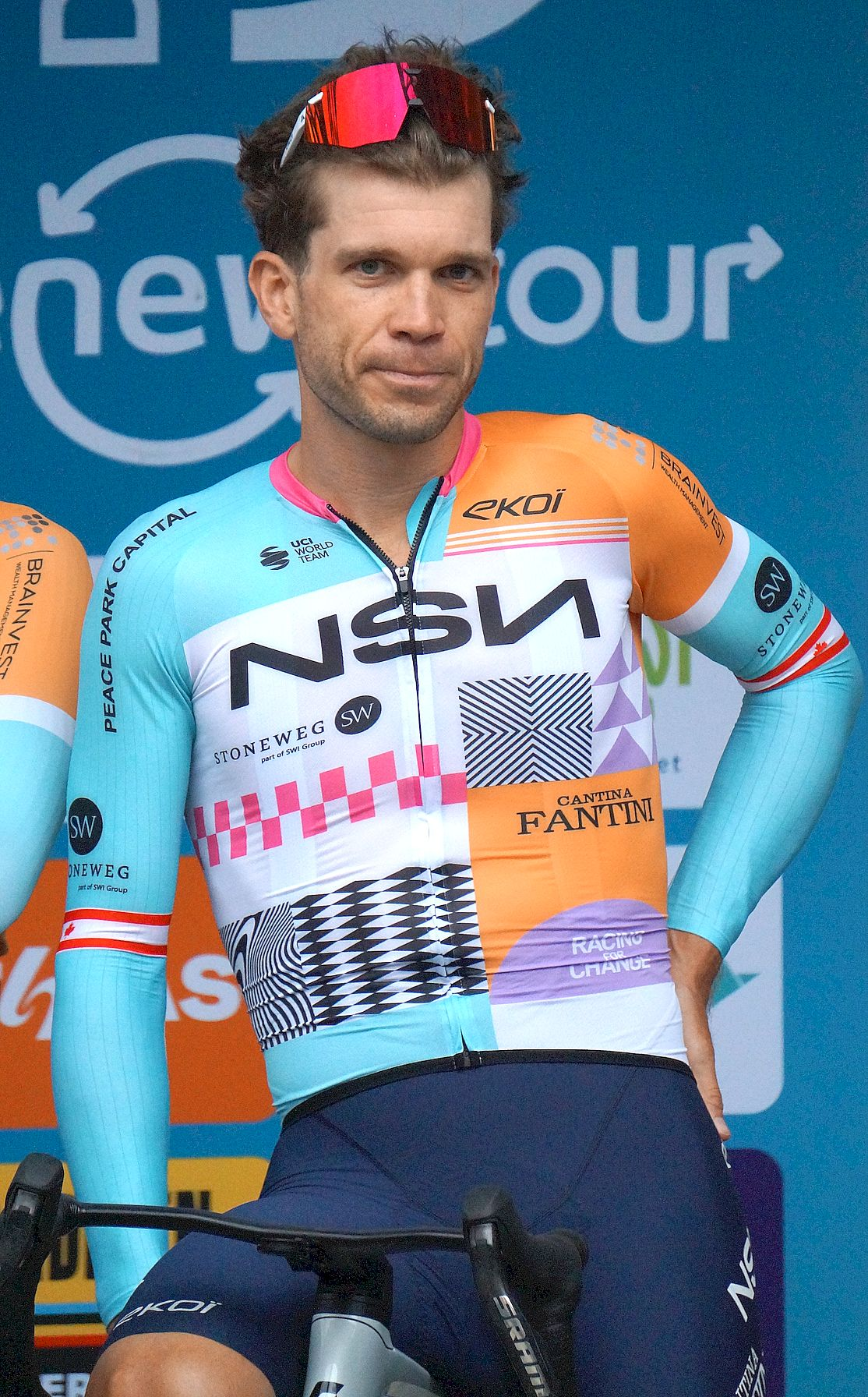
- Boivin in 2026

Personal information
- Full name: Guillaume Boivin
- Born: 25 May 1989 (age 37) Montreal, Quebec, Canada
- Height: 1.80 m (5 ft 11 in)
- Weight: 78 kg (172 lb)

Cycling career
- Sport: Cycling
- Current team: NSN Cycling Team
- Discipline: Road
- Role: Rider
- Rider type: Classics specialist; Sprinter

Amateur teams
- 2004–2006: Vélo Club Longueuil
- 2006: André Cycle IDCAD
- 2007–2008: EVA Devinci
- 2007–2009: Predictor–Lotto–VC Ardennes
- 2009: Volkswagen–Specialized
- 2009: Planet Energy (stagiaire)

Professional teams
- 2010–2012: SpiderTech–Planet Energy
- 2013–2014: Cannondale
- 2015: Optum–Kelly Benefit Strategies
- 2016–: Cycling Academy

Major wins
- One-Day Races and Classics National Road Race Championships (2015, 2021)
Medal record
Representing Canada
Men's road bicycle racing
World Championships
Bronze medal – third place	2010 Melbourne/Geelong	Under-23 road race

Guillaume Boivin (born 25 May 1989) is a Canadian professional road racing cyclist, who currently rides for UCI ProTeam NSN Development Team.

== Career ==
Boivin's greatest cycling accomplishment was finishing in a dead heat for the bronze at the World Under-23 Road Race Championships in 2010. He finished 3rd in the 2012 Tro Bro Leon, getting on the podium with his teammate Ryan Roth, who won the race. In October 2014, it was announced that Boivin would leave Cannondale and ride with Optum–Kelly Benefit Strategies in 2015. On 29 April 2015, on the first stage of the Tour of the Gila, Boivin was the last man remaining of a breakaway that was caught by eventual solo winner, Rafael Montiel. Boivin took the second place of the mountaintop finish.

In May 2018, he was named in the startlist for the Giro d'Italia.

=== 2020 Olympics ===
In July 2021, Boivin was named to Canada's 2020 Olympic team.

== Major results ==
2006
3rd Overall Tour de l'Abitibi
2007
4th Overall Tour de l'Abitibi

1st Points classification
1st Stages 2 & 7

2008
1st Overall Tour de Québec

1st Stage 3

2009 (1 pro win)
1st Road race, National Under-23 Road Championships
2nd Time trial, Canada Summer Games
2010
1st Overall Tour de Québec

1st Stage 3

1st Stage 13 Vuelta a Cuba
2nd Sparkassen Giro Bochum
3rd Road race, UCI Under-23 Road World Championships
6th Philadelphia International Championship
7th Overall Mi-Août en Bretagne

1st Stages 1 & 3

2012
2nd Ronde van Drenthe
3rd Tro-Bro Léon
4th Handzame Classic
4th Grand Prix Pino Cerami
5th Grand Prix de Denain
7th Overall World Ports Classic
10th Scheldeprijs
2013
1st Stage 2 Tour de Beauce
2015 (1)
1st Road race, National Road Championships
1st Stage 3b Tour de Beauce
3rd Road race, Pan American Games
3rd Overall Grand Prix Cycliste de Saguenay

1st Points classification

5th Overall GP Internacional do Guadiana
5th Clássica Loulé
2016
1st Stage 1 Tour of Rwanda
7th Trofej Umag
7th Circuito del Porto
2017 (1)
2nd Overall Tour of Taihu Lake

1st Prologue

2nd Overall Grand Prix Cycliste de Saguenay
2nd Coppa Bernocchi
4th Road race, National Road Championships
8th Memorial Marco Pantani
2018 (1)
1st Famenne Ardenne Classic
4th Gooikse Pijl
7th Kuurne–Brussels–Kuurne
2019
2nd Overall Vuelta a Castilla y León
8th Druivenkoers Overijse
2021 (1)
1st Road race, National Road Championships
9th Paris–Roubaix
2022
2nd Road race, National Road Championships
5th Primus Classic
8th Heistse Pijl
9th Famenne Ardenne Classic
2023
9th Dwars door Vlaanderen
2025
8th Maryland Cycling Classic

=== Grand Tour general classification results timeline ===
Grand Tour	2013	2014	2015	2016	2017	2018	2019	2020	2021	2022	2023
Giro d'Italia	—	—	—	—	—	117	125	—	—	—	—
Tour de France	—	—	—	—	—	—	—	—	105	DNF	126
Vuelta a España	DNF	149	—	—	—	—	—	—	—	—	

Legend
—	Did not compete
DNF	Did not finish
