= Antoine Duchesne =

Canadian cyclist (born 1991)

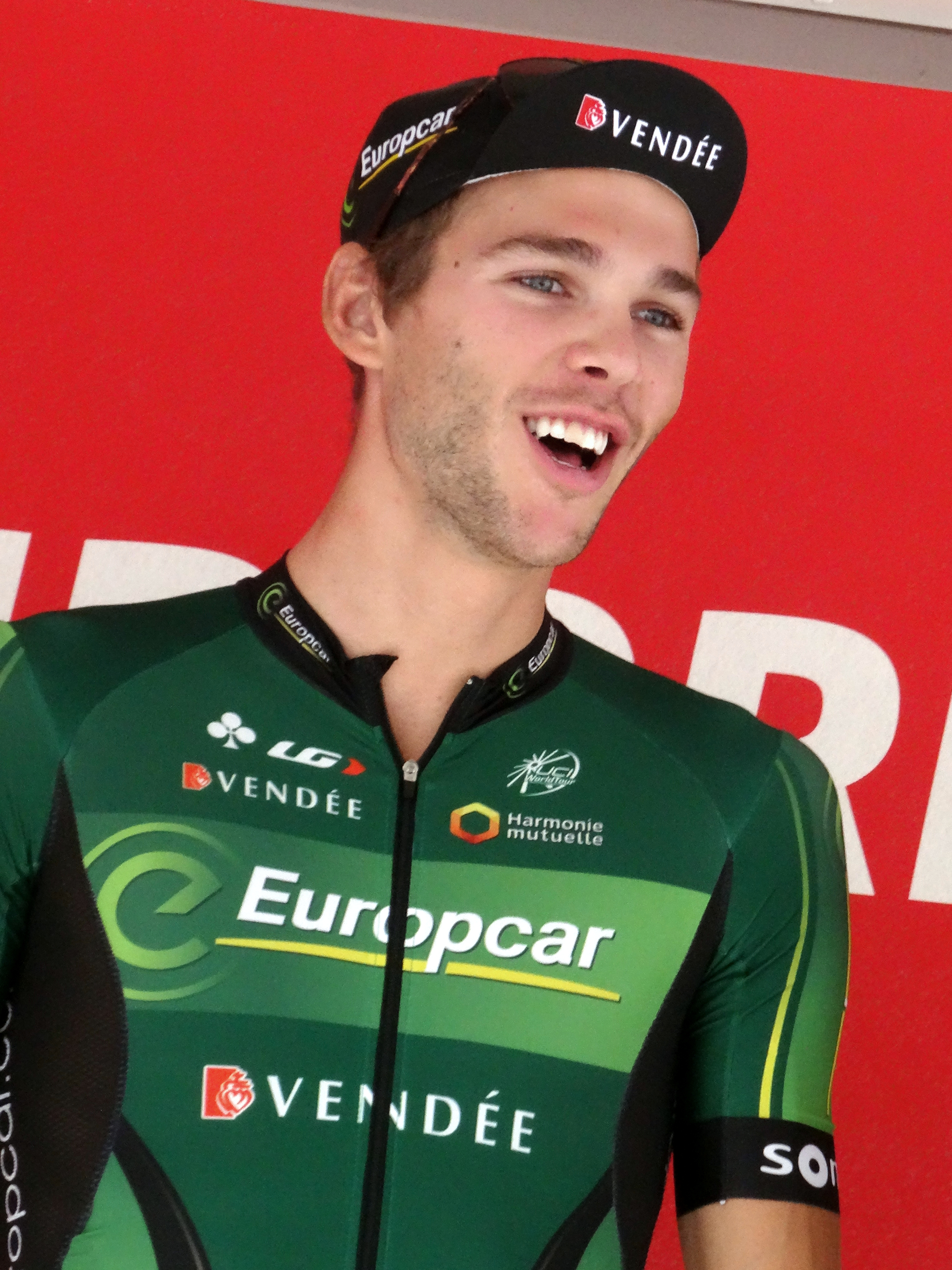
- Duchesne at the 2014 Tour de Wallonie

Personal information
- Full name: Antoine Duchesne
- Nickname: Tony the Tiger
- Born: September 12, 1991 (age 35) Saguenay, Quebec, Canada
- Height: 1.90 m (6 ft 3 in)
- Weight: 75 kg (165 lb)

Cycling career
- Sport: Cycling
- Current team: Retired
- Discipline: Road
- Role: Rider
- Rider type: Classics specialist

Amateur team
- 2012: Team Québecor Garneau

Professional teams
- 2012: SpiderTech–C10 (stagiaire)
- 2013: Bontrager Cycling Team
- 2014–2017: Team Europcar
- 2018–2022: FDJ

Major wins
- One-day races and Classics National Road Race Championships (2018)

Antoine Duchesne (born September 12, 1991) is a Canadian former cyclist, who competed as a professional from 2013 to 2022.

In May 2015, Duchesne helped his teammate Bryan Coquard to victory on the first stage of the Four Days of Dunkirk, especially in the finale where he took long pulls in the leading group, setting his teammate up for the win. He was named in the start list for the 2015 Vuelta a España and the 2016 Tour de France.

== Major results ==
2009
1st Road race, National Junior Road Championships
5th Overall Tour de l'Abitibi
2012
3rd Overall Tour de Québec

1st Stage 1

2013
1st Road race, National Under-23 Road Championships
3rd Road race, National Road Championships
8th Overall Coupe des nations Ville Saguenay
2014
2nd Polynormande
2015
3rd Polynormande
10th Overall Four Days of Dunkirk
2016
1st Mountains classification Paris–Nice
8th Overall Tour of Alberta
2018
1st Road race, National Road Championships
2021
2nd Road race, National Road Championships

=== Grand Tour general classification results timeline ===
Grand Tour	2015	2016	2017	2018	2019	2020	2021	2022
Giro d'Italia	—	—	—	—	—	—	115	—
Tour de France	—	107	—	—	—	—	—	62
Vuelta a España	138	—	—	127	—	—	—	—

Legend
—	Did not compete
DNF	Did not finish
