= Katherine Maine =

Canadian cyclist

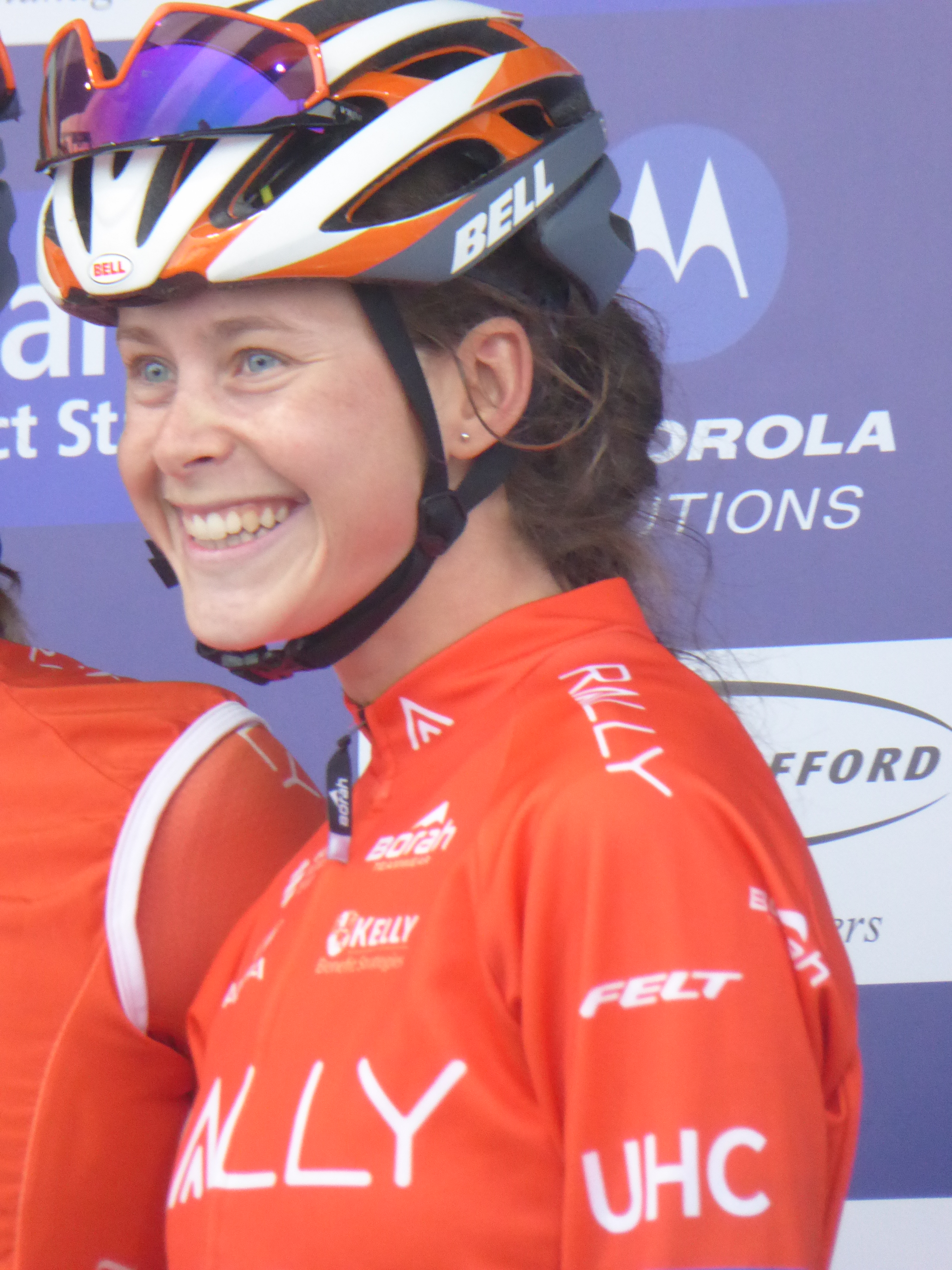
- Maine at the 2019 Women's Tour of Scotland

Personal information
- Full name: Katherine Maine
- Born: 22 November 1997 (age 28) Ottawa, Ontario, Canada

Cycling career
- Sport: Cycling
- Current team: Retired
- Discipline: Road
- Role: Rider
- Rider type: All-rounder

Amateur team
- 2015: The Cyclery–Opus

Professional team
- 2016–2019: Rally Cycling

Katherine Maine (born 22 November 1997) is a Canadian former professional racing cyclist, who rode professionally for UCI Women's Team Rally UHC Cycling between 2016 and 2019. Maine's single professional victory came when she won the 2018 Canadian National Road Race Championships in Saguenay, Quebec.

== See also ==
- List of 2016 UCI Women's Teams and riders
