= Martin Willock =

Canadian cyclist

Personal information
- Born: 28 September 1954 (age 72) Victoria, British Columbia, Canada

Cycling career
- Sport: Cycling
- Discipline: Road racing

Martin Willock (born 28 September 1954) is a Canadian former cyclist. He competed in the team time trial event at the 1984 Summer Olympics.

== Career ==
Willock was a member of the Victoria Wheelers cycling club. In 1977, he came second at a 50-lap cycling event around the streets of Vancouver. In 1979, he came fifth at the Canadian National Championships, and later in the year, he competed at the 1979 UCI Road World Championships. In 1980, Willock retired from professional cycling in order to build a house, but returned to the sport the following year. In 1981, Willock was in the British Columbian team that won the Canadian Provincial 100 km team time trial. During the race, he suffered a flat tire. In the same year, he came second in the Whistler two-day 220 km cycle race, finishing behind his brother Bernie. In 1981, he also came seventh at the Gastown Grand Prix. In 1982, Willock retired again, this time to set up a repairs company, before once again returning the following year.

Willock competed in the 1983 Pan American Games. In the same year, he finished second at the British Columbian road racing championships, and came seventh at the Tour de Québec. He competed in the team time trial event at the 1984 Summer Olympics, after setting a Canadian national record of 2:04:21 in the country's Olympic trial event, which was faster than the Canadian qualifying time of 2:07:00.

In 1990, Willock was a coach of the British Columbian junior provincial cycling squad. Willock was still cycling in the Victoria Cycle League in 2002.

== Personal life ==
Aside from sport, Willock has worked as a boat builder in Sidney, British Columbia. He is the brother of Bernie Willock, who qualified for the 1980 Summer Olympics but did not compete due to the American-led boycott, and the father of Erinne Willock, who competed at the 2008 Summer Olympics.
