= Czeslaw Lukaszewicz =

Canadian cyclist

Personal information
- Full name: Czeslaw Lukaszewicz
- Nickname: Luka
- Born: 28 April 1964 (age 62) Kętrzyn

Cycling career
- Sport: Cycling
- Discipline: Road
- Role: Rider, team manager

Professional teams
- 1992: Evian
- 1993: Reynolds - Volkswagen
- 1998: Mróz
- 1999-2000: Wüstenrot - ZVVZ
- 2001: Servisco

Managerial team
- 2011-: Iga Team

Major wins
- Tour de Beauce (1991), Canadian National Road Race Championships (1994, 1997, 1999, 2000)

Czeslaw "Luka" Lukaszewicz (born 28 April 1964 in Kętrzyn) is a former Polish-born Canadian cyclist and current sports director.

In 1991, Lukaszewicz won the Canadian stage race Tour de Beauce. He was professional from 1992 to 2001. During this time, he was the national road champion of Canada four times - 1994, 1997, 1999 and 2000 - and is thus record holder.

He participated in the road race at the 2000 Summer Olympics in Sydney, but did not finish.

== Palmarès ==
1987
3rd Overall Tour de Pologne

1st Points Classification

1991
1st Overall Tour de Beauce
1994
1st National Road Race Championships
1997
1st National Road Race Championships
1st Stage 1 Tour de Beauce
1998
3rd Canadian National Road Race Championships
1st Stage 4 Fitchburg Longsjo Classic
1999
1st National Road Race Championships
2000
1st National Road Race Championships
