= Charles Dionne (cyclist) =

Canadian cyclist

Personal information
- Born: 15 March 1979 (age 47) Saint-Rédempteur, Lévis, Quebec, Canada

Cycling career
- Sport: Cycling
- Current team: Retired
- Discipline: Road
- Role: Rider

Professional teams
- 1999: Shaklee–Degree Radio Energie
- 2001–2002: 7Up–Colorado Cyclist
- 2003: Saturn
- 2004–2005: Webcor Cycling Team
- 2006: Saunier Duval–Prodir
- 2007: Colavita–Sutter Home
- 2008: Successfulliving.com p/b Parkpre
- 2009–2010: Fly V Australia
Medal record
Men's road bicycle racing
Representing Canada
Pan American Championships
Silver medal – second place	2005 Mar del Plata	Road race

Charles Dionne (born 15 March 1979) is a Canadian former professional road cyclist.

== Major results ==
1998
1st Overall Tour de Toona
1999
1st Stage 5 Tour de Hokkaido
2000
1st Overall Coupe Pro-Elite Mardis Cyclistes de Lachine
2002
1st San Francisco Grand Prix
1st Stages 2, 4 & 7 Tour de Toona
1st Stage 4 Redlands Bicycle Classic
3rd Clarendon Cup
5th Road race, National Road Championships
2003
1st Stage 4 Redlands Bicycle Classic
6th Wachovia Classic
2004
1st San Francisco Grand Prix
1st Stage 3 Tour de Beauce
1st Stage 5 Redlands Bicycle Classic
1st Stage 5 Cascade Cycling Classic
3rd Overall Tour of Wellington

1st Stage 2

2005
1st Criterium, National Road Championships
1st Stage 5 Tour de Beauce
2nd Road race, Pan American Cycling Championships
2007
1st Criterium, National Road Championships
5th Reading Classic
7th Philadelphia International Cycling Classic
2008
1st Stages 2 & 4 Tour de Québec
4th Tour de Leelanau
10th Overall Rochester Omnium
2009
1st Stage 5 Tour de Beauce
2nd US Air Force Cycling Classic
2nd Overall Fitchburg Longsjo Classic

1st Stages 3 & 4

3rd Overall Tour de Québec
2010
1st Stage 4 Fitchburg Longsjo Classic
