= Bruno Langlois =

Canadian racing cyclist

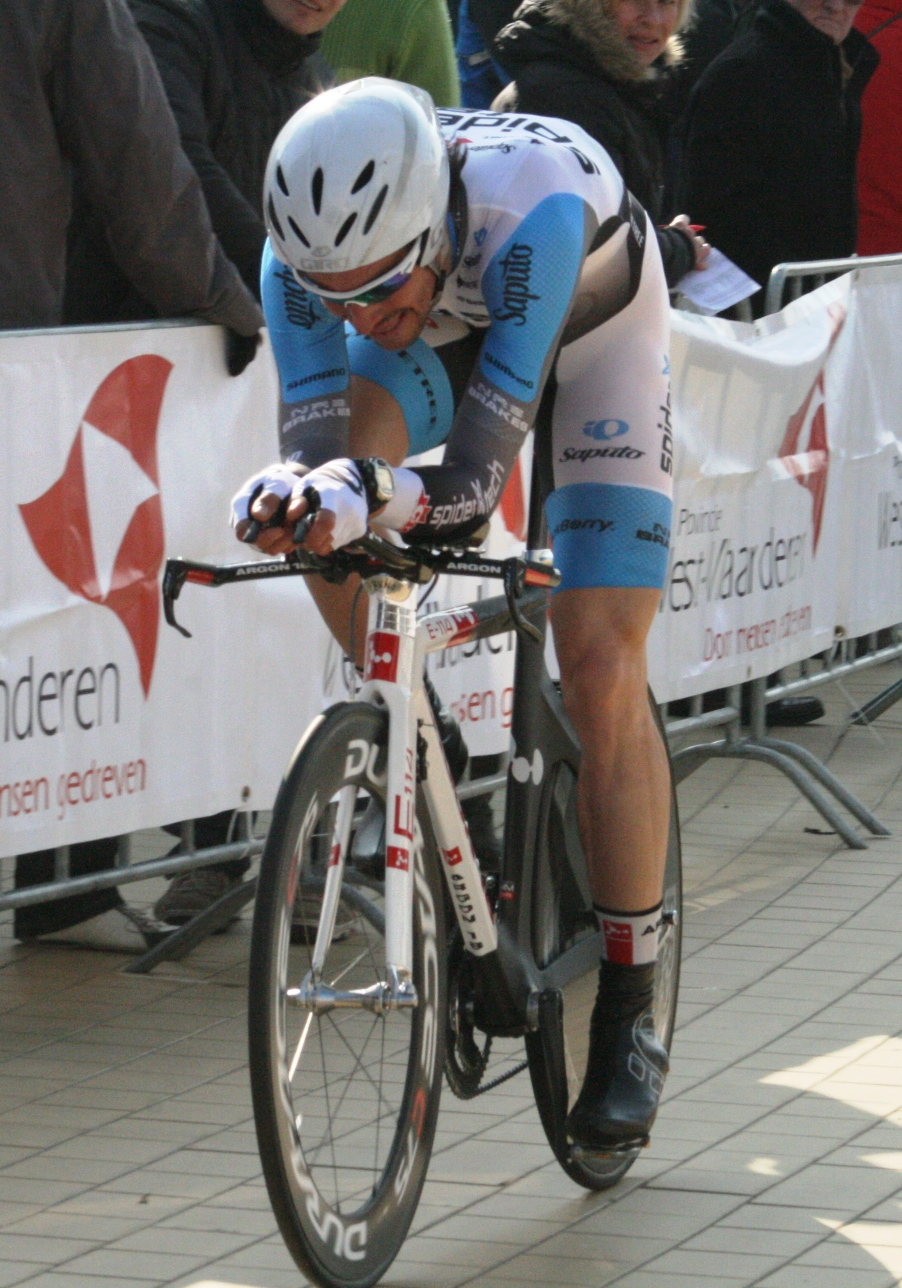
- Langlois at the 2011 Driedaagse van West-Vlaanderen

Personal information
- Full name: Bruno Langlois
- Born: March 1, 1979 (age 47) Matane, Quebec, Canada

Cycling career
- Sport: Cycling
- Current team: Cartel RT
- Discipline: Road
- Role: Rider

Amateur teams
- 2012: Team Québecor Garneau
- 2018–2019: E.C. Velo Cartel
- 2023–: Velo Cartel

Professional teams
- 1999: Jet Fuel Coffee–Vitasoy
- 2005: Jittery Joe's–Kalahari
- 2006: AEG Toshiba–Jetnetwork Pro
- 2007: Vallée de l'Aluminium de Vinci
- 2009–2011: Planet Energy
- 2013: Team Québecor Garneau
- 2014: 5-hour Energy
- 2015–2017: Garneau–Québecor
- 2019: Brunei Continental Cycling Team

Bruno Langlois (born March 1, 1979) is a Canadian racing cyclist, who currently rides for club team Cartel RT.

== Career ==
Born in Matane, Quebec, Langlois began his professional career in 1999 with the Jet Fuel Coffee – Vitasoy cycling team. In 2012, along with directeur sportif Phil Cortes, Langlois rode for Canadian cycling team Team Québecor Garneau, ranking second in the final general classification of the Tour de Guadeloupe. He was ranked as the best climber in a UCI World Tour one day race in his home country, the Grand Prix Cycliste de Québec, a very hilly course. In 2014, Langlois was riding with 5-hour Energy, before he returned to Garneau–Québecor for 2015.

== Major results ==
2006
1st Overall Tobago International

1st Stage 3

1st Stage 5 Tour de Shenandoah
1st Stage 2 Tri-Peaks Challenge
2008
2nd Road race, National Road Championships
2nd Overall Tour de Québec
3rd Overall Classique Montréal-Québec Louis Garneau
2010
1st Stage 2 Tour de Québec
2nd Overall Vuelta a la Independencia Nacional

1st Stage 1

3rd Road race, National Road Championships
2011
1st Overall Tour de Québec

1st Stages 2 & 3

6th Tro-Bro Léon
2012
1st Stage 6 Tour de Beauce
Tour du Rwanda

1st Stages 4 & 8

2nd Overall Tour de Québec

1st Stages 2 & 5

2nd Overall Tour de Guadeloupe

1st Stage 6

8th Overall Vuelta a la Independencia Nacional

1st Stages 7 & 8b (ITT)

9th Tour of the Battenkill
2013
3rd Overall Vuelta a la Independencia Nacional

1st Stage 6b

2014
8th Winston-Salem Cycling Classic
2015
Grand Prix Cycliste de Saguenay

1st Mountains classification
1st Stages 2 & 4

2016
1st Road race, National Road Championships
2nd White Spot / Delta Road Race
2017
3rd Winston-Salem Cycling Classic
8th Overall Tour de Beauce
9th Overall Grand Prix Cycliste de Saguenay
2018
6th Overall Tour de Guadeloupe

1st Stage 3
