= Mark Walters (cyclist) =

Canadian cyclist

Personal information
- Born: 15 February 1976 (age 50) Milfort, Canada

Cycling career
- Sport: Cycling
- Current team: Retired
- Discipline: Road
- Role: Rider

Professional teams
- 1998: Mercury
- 1999–2006: Navigators
- 2007: Kodakgallery.com–Sierra Nevada
- 2008: Team R.A.C.E. Pro

Mark Walters (born 15 February 1976 in Milfort) is a Canadian former cyclist.

== Major results ==
1998
1st National Road Race Championships
1st Stage 5 Tour de Beauce
1999
1st Tour de Okinawa
2nd Overall Tour de Toona

1st Stage 5

3rd National Road Race Championships
2001
1st National Road Race Championships
3rd Omloop van het Houtland
2002
1st Philadelphia International Championship
2003
2nd Overall Tour de Toona

1st Stage 6

2nd National Road Race Championships
2004
3rd Overall Fitchburg Longsjo Classic

1st Stage 3

2007
1st Stage 1 Tour de Beauce
