= Max Grace =

New Zealand cyclist

Personal information
- Born: 14 December 1942 (age 83) Ōtāhuhu, New Zealand

Cycling career
- Sport: Cycling

Major wins
- One-day races and Classics National Road Race Championships (1970, 1971, 1972)

Max Grace (born 14 December 1942) is a former New Zealand cyclist. He competed in the individual road race and team time trial events at the 1964 Summer Olympics. In 1969 Grace switched nationalities to Canadian and went on to win three Canadian National Championships.

== Major results ==
1961
2nd NZ NZ National Road Race Jr.
1962
3rd NZ National Road Race Championship
1963
7th NZ National Road Race Championship
1966
4th NZ National Road Race Championship
1967
2nd NZ National Road Race Championship
2nd NZ National 100k Team Time Trial Championship
1970
1st Road race, National Road Championships
1971
1st Road race, National Road Championships
1972
1st Road race, National Road Championships
1973
2nd National 100k Team Time Trial Championship
2nd Gastown Grand Prix
1974
1st Gastown Grand Prix
5th Canadian National Road Championship

1975;

3rd Gastown Grand Prix
