= Ben Perry =

Canadian cyclist (born 1994)

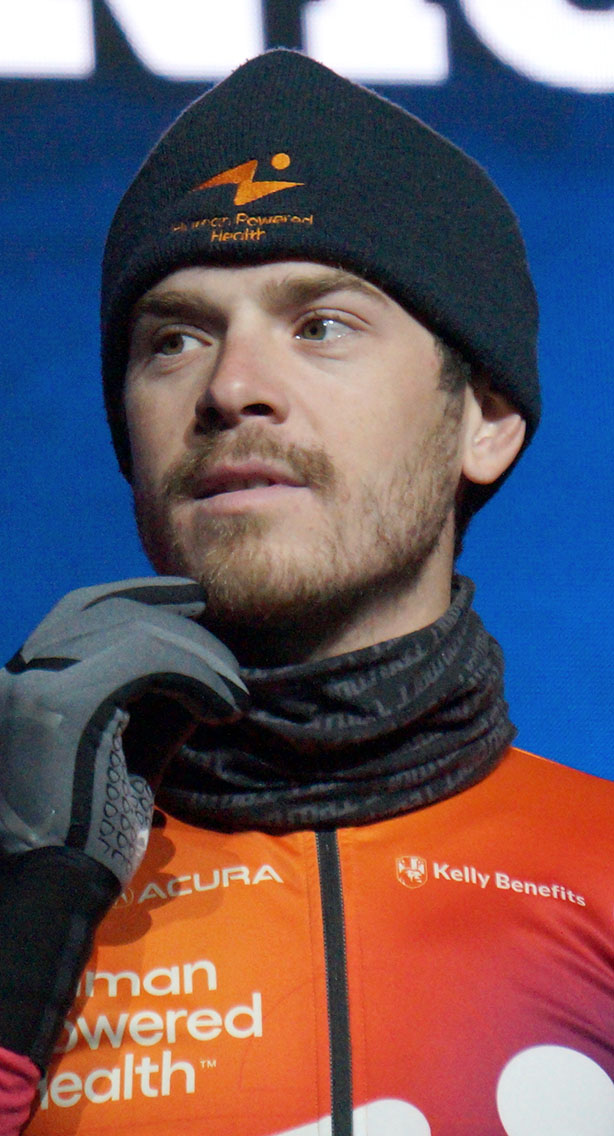
- Perry in 2023

Personal information
- Full name: Benjamin Jefrey Perry
- Born: 7 March 1994 (age 32) St. Catharines, Ontario
- Height: 180 cm (5 ft 11 in)
- Weight: 70 kg (154 lb)

Cycling career
- Sport: Cycling
- Current team: Retired
- Disciplines: Road; Cyclo-cross
- Role: Rider
- Rider type: All-rounder

Amateur teams
- 2012: Sport en steun Leopoldsburg
- 2013: Lotto–Belisol U23
- 2014: Baguet–MIBA Poorten–Indulek

Professional teams
- 2015–2016: Silber Pro Cycling Team
- 2017–2019: Israel Cycling Academy
- 2020: Israel Cycling Academy
- 2021: Astana–Premier Tech
- 2022: WiV SunGod
- 2023: Human Powered Health

Benjamin Jefrey "Ben" Perry (born 7 March 1994) is a Canadian cyclist, who competed as a professional from 2015 to 2023.

== Career ==
He was educated at Sir Winston Churchill Secondary School in St. Catharines where, prior to focusing on cycling, he also competed in cross country running. In September 2016 the Israel Cycling Academy announced that Perry would join them on an initial two-year deal from 2017.

In November 2020, Perry signed with the Astana–Premier Tech team for the 2021 season. The following season, Perry joined British Continental team WiV SunGod.

== Major results ==
2010
1st Junior race, National Cyclo-cross Championships
2012
3rd Road race, National Junior Road Championships
2014
1st Road race, National Under-23 Road Championships
2015
National Road Championships

1st Criterium
1st Under-23 road race
5th Road race

1st Stage 5 Tour de Beauce
1st Mountains classification, Tour of Alberta
7th Overall Grand Prix Cycliste de Saguenay
2016
National Road Championships

1st Under-23 road race
2nd Road race

2nd Overall Grand Prix Cycliste de Saguenay

1st Points classification
1st Young rider classification
1st Stage 1

7th Philadelphia International Cycling Classic
10th Overall Joe Martin Stage Race
2017
3rd Overall Baltic Chain Tour

1st Stage 2

2018
1st Mountains classification, Tour de Beauce
2nd Road race, National Road Championships
6th Overall Tour de Korea
2019
2nd Overall Tour de Korea

1st Stage 3

6th Rund um Köln
2022
2nd Lincoln Grand Prix
3rd Road race, National Road Championships
4th Overall Tour of Britain
7th Overall Tour of Antalya
