= Jason Lowndes =

Australian cyclist (1994–2017)

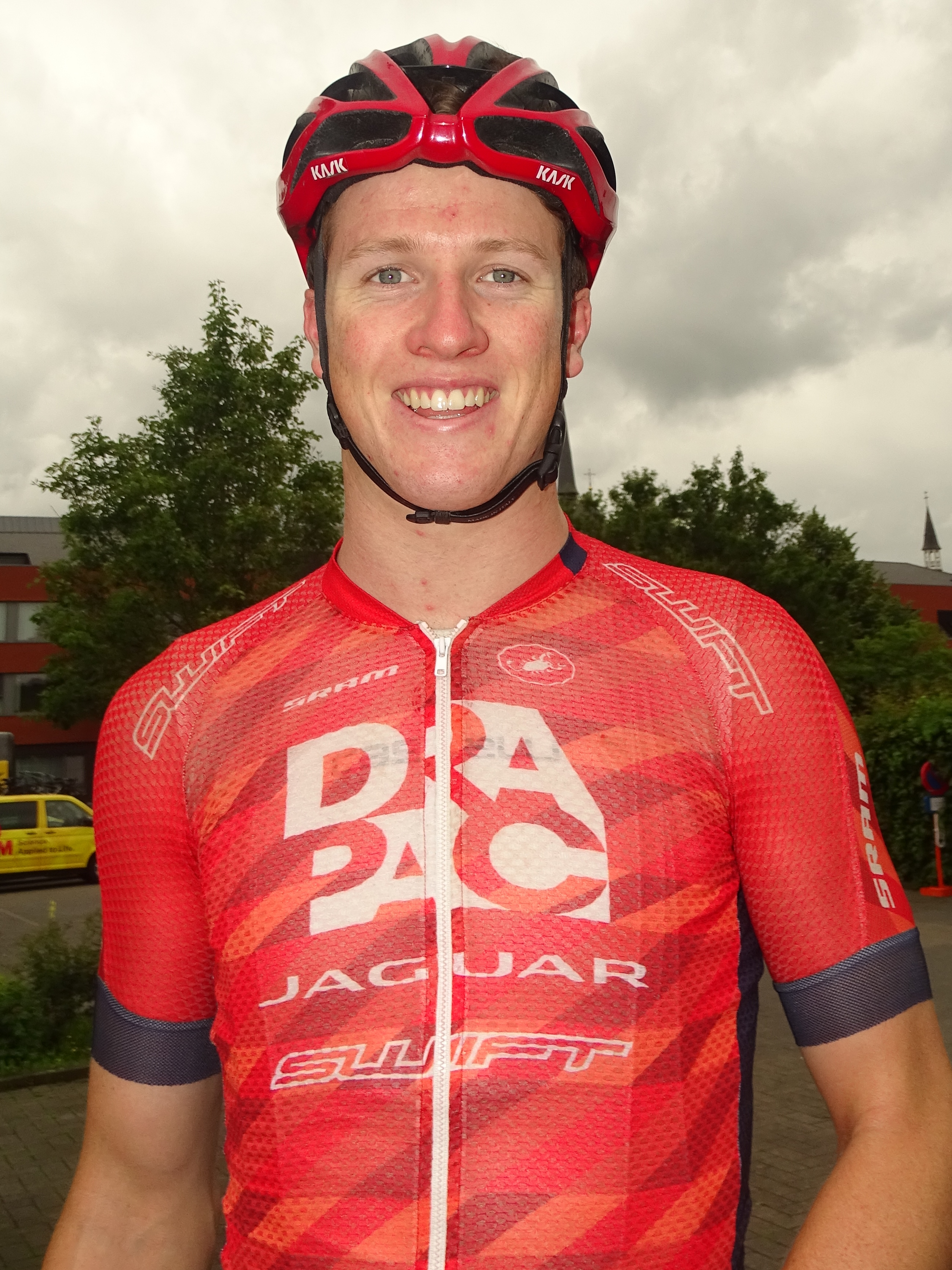
- Lowndes in 2016

Personal information
- Born: 14 December 1994 Kalgoorlie, Western Australia, Australia
- Died: 22 December 2017 (aged 23) Bendigo, Victoria, Australia
- Height: 194 cm (6 ft 4 in)
- Weight: 82 kg (181 lb)

Cycling career
- Sport: Cycling
- Discipline: Road
- Role: Rider

Professional teams
- 2015: Garneau–Québecor
- 2016: Drapac Professional Cycling
- 2017: Israel Cycling Academy

Jason Lowndes (14 December 1994 – 22 December 2017) was an Australian cyclist, who rode professionally for the Garneau–Québecor, Drapac Professional Cycling and Israel Cycling Academy teams.

He died after being hit from behind by a car while cycling near Bendigo, Victoria.

== Major results ==
2015
5th Overall Grand Prix Cycliste de Saguenay

1st Young rider classification

7th White Spot / Delta Road Race
2016
6th Road race, UCI Road World Under-23 Championships
