= Sue Palmer-Komar =

Canadian cyclist

Personal information
- Full name: Susan Palmer-Komar
- Born: January 27, 1967 (age 59) Collingwood, Ontario

Cycling career
- Sport: Cycling
- Discipline: Road
- Role: Rider

Professional teams
- 1998: Haro MTB Team
- 1999: Janec
- 2001: Jane's Cosmetic
- 2007: Colavita

Susan Palmer-Komar (born January 27, 1967, in Collingwood, Ontario) is a Canadian racing cyclist. She represented Canada at the 1996 Summer Olympics and 2004 Summer Olympics in the women's road race and in 2004 also in the women's time trial. She also rode at the 1998, 2000, 2001, 2002, 2003, 2004, 2005 and 2006 UCI Road World Championships. She now teaches elementary school students in Hamilton, Ontario.

== Palmarès ==
1992
2nd Canadian National Road Race Championships

1995
2nd Canadian National Road Race Championships
2nd Canadian National Time Trial Championships

1996
1st (Canada) Canadian National Road Race Championships

1997
3rd Canadian National Road Race Championships

2002
2nd Road race, Commonwealth Games, Rivington

2003
3rd Canadian National Road Race Championships
2nd Waalse Pijl (F) (BEL)

2004
3rd Prologue, Redlands Bicycle Classic, Mt Rubidoux (USA)
2nd Stage 3, Redlands Bicycle Classic (USA)
1st Circuit National Féminin de Saint-Amand-Montrond (FRA)
1st (Canada) Canadian National Time Trial Championships

2005
1st (Canada) Canadian National Time Trial Championships
3rd Canadian National Road Race Championships
