= Félix Côté-Bouvette =

Canadian cyclist (born 1993)

Félix Cote-Bouvette
Personal information
- Born: 8 July 1993 (age 33) Lachine, Quebec, Canada
- Height: 5 ft 9 in (1.75 m)
- Weight: 140 lb (64 kg; 10 st)

Cycling career
- Sport: Cycling
- Discipline: Road
- Role: Rider
- Rider type: All-Rounder

Professional team
- 2015: H&R Block Pro Cycling

Félix Cote-Bouvette is a Canadian bicycle racer, currently with the H&R Block Pro Cycling team.
