= Cycling at the 2013 Canada Summer Games =

Cycling at the 2013 Canada Summer Games was in Sherbrooke, Quebec for road cycling and Mont Bellevue for mountain biking. It was held from the 3 to 18 August. There were 6 events of cycling.

== Medal table ==
The following is the medal table for cycling at the 2013 Canada Summer Games.

* Host nation (Quebec)

Rank	Nation	Gold	Silver	Bronze	Total
1	Quebec*	5	3	2	10
2	Ontario	3	3	3	9
3	Manitoba	0	1	1	2
4	Nova Scotia	0	1	0	1
5	British Columbia	0	0	2	2
Totals (5 entries)		8	8	8	24

== Mountain biking ==
=== Men's ===
Event	Gold		Silver		Bronze	
Cross country	Léandre Bouchard; Quebec	1:20:09.300	Antoine Caron; Quebec	1:20:41.620	Mitchell Bailey; Ontario	1:21:51.840
Sprint	Léandre Bouchard; Quebec		Andrew L'Esperance; Nova Scotia		Quinn Moberg; British Columbia	
Relay	Quebec	53:56.590	Ontario	54:49.900	British Columbia	58:01.940

=== Women's ===
Event	Gold		Silver		Bronze	
Cross country	Fred Trudel; Quebec	1:12:47.200	Laura Bietola; Ontario	1:13:06.630	Karlee Gendron; Manitoba	1:13:41.010
Sprint	Andréane Lanthier Nadeau; Quebec		Laura Bietola; Ontario		Laurence Harvey; Quebec	
Relay	Ontario	1:07:49.230	Manitoba; Karlee Gendron; Anna Schappert	1:11:16.490	Quebec	1:11:17.620

== Road cycling ==
=== Men's ===
Event	Gold		Silver		Bronze	
Road race	Pierrick Naud; Quebec	3:11:53.00	Matteo Dal-Cin; Ontario	3:11:53.00	James Piccoli; Quebec	3:14:34.00
Individual time trial	Matteo Dal-Cin; Ontario	24:58.86	James Piccoli; Quebec	25:03.16	Jordan Cheyne; Ontario	25:05.60
Criterium	Pierrick Naud; Quebec	25	Elliott Doyle; Quebec	19	Kris Dahl; Alberta	10

=== Women's ===
Event	Gold		Silver		Bronze	
Road race	Alizée Brien; Quebec	2:17:23.00	Adriane Provost; Quebec	2:22:15.00	Elisabeth Albert; Quebec	2:23:30.00
Individual time trial	Annie Foreman-Mackey; Ontario	21:46.42	Alizée Brien; Quebec	21:47.81	Saskia Kowalchuk; Ontario	22:10.59
Criterium	Adriane Provost; Quebec	15	Annie Foreman-Mackey; Ontario	15	Tessa Pinckston; British Columbia	12
