= Maria Hawkins =

Canadian cyclist

Personal information
- Full name: Lena Maria Hawkins
- Born: 5 May 1962 (age 64) Wroughton, England
- Height: 162 cm (5 ft 4 in)
- Weight: 54 kg (119 lb)

Cycling career
- Sport: Cycling
- Discipline: Road cycling
- Role: Rider

Professional team
- Team Kahlua

Lena Maria Hawkins (born 5 May 1962) is a road cyclist from Canada. She represented her nation at the 1992 Summer Olympics in the women's road race.
