= Hugo Houle =

Canadian cyclist

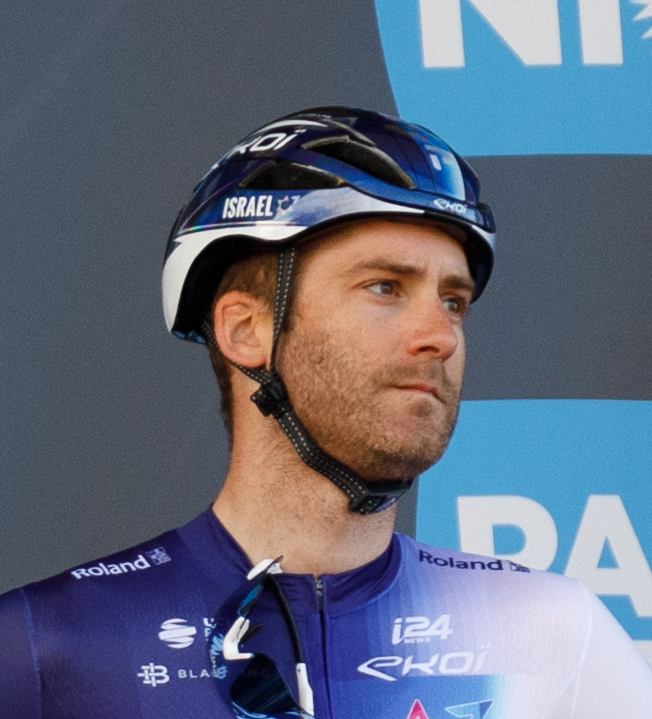
- Houle at the 2023 Paris–Nice

Personal information
- Full name: Hugo Houle
- Born: September 27, 1990 (age 36) Sainte-Perpétue, Canada
- Height: 1.82 m (6 ft 0 in)
- Weight: 72 kg (159 lb)

Cycling career
- Sport: Cycling
- Current team: Alpecin–Premier Tech
- Discipline: Road
- Role: Rider
- Rider type: All-rounder

Amateur team
- 2010: Canadian National Team

Professional teams
- 2011–2012: SpiderTech–C10
- 2013–2017: Ag2r–La Mondiale
- 2018–2021: Astana
- 2022–2025: Israel–Premier Tech
- 2026–: Alpecin–Premier Tech

Major wins
- Grand Tours Tour de France 1 individual stage (2022) One-Day Races and Classics National Time Trial Championships (2015, 2021)
Medal record
Representing Canada
Men's road bicycle racing
Pan American Games
Gold medal – first place	2015 Toronto	Time trial

Hugo Houle (born September 27, 1990) is a Canadian professional cyclist, who rides for UCI WorldTeam Alpecin–Premier Tech.

== Career ==
Born in Sainte-Perpétue, Centre-du-Québec, Quebec, Houle began racing triathlons, aged 10, alongside his brother, before focussing on cycling at the age of 16. He became acquainted with former professional cyclist Louis Garneau, who provided him with a team and equipment. Between 2008 and 2010, Houle combined cycling with completing a college degree in Québec. After graduating, he signed his first professional contract with Canadian team SpiderTech–C10. Whilst at SpiderTech–C10, Houle won the general classification of the Tour de Québec as well as a stage. He also finished third in the Canadian National Time Trial Championships in 2012, as well as finishing fourth at the under-23 road race at the 2012 UCI Road World Championships.

=== AG2R La Mondiale (2013–17) ===
SpiderTech–C10 disbanded at the end of the 2012 season, and Houle moved to French professional team Ag2r–La Mondiale. During this time, he competed in the Giro d'Italia twice and the Vuelta a España once. He also won the time trial at the Pan American Games and the Canadian National Time Trial Championships in 2015. In 2016, he was officially named in Canada's 2016 Olympic team.

=== Astana (2018–21) ===
In 2018, Houle signed for Astana, becoming the first Canadian to sign for the team. He rode his first Tour de France in 2019. In September 2019, he extended his contract with Astana through 2022. He represented Canada at the 2020 Summer Olympics.

=== Israel–Premier Tech ===
Despite holding a contract for the 2022 season with the Astana Qazaqstan Team, Houle left the team, and joined Israel–Premier Tech on a three-year contract.

Having featured in the breakaway on the ninth stage of the Tour de France without success, Houle was involved in a successful breakaway four stages later with Mads Pedersen and Fred Wright; Houle led out the sprint in Saint-Étienne, but was beaten to the line by both Pedersen and Wright. Following the final rest day, Houle made his third breakaway of the race on stage 16. With 39 kilometres (24 miles) remaining, Houle opened a gap on the rest of the breakaway and soloed away to win the stage by more than a minute ahead of Valentin Madouas and teammate Michael Woods. This made him only the second Canadian rider to win an individual stage in the Tour de France, after his Israel–Premier Tech directeur sportif Steve Bauer, who won the first stage in 1988. He then followed this up with second place overall, behind Andreas Leknessund, at the Arctic Race of Norway.

== Personal life ==
Houle's brother, Pierrick, was killed by a drunk driver in 2012 while out running. Since then, Houle has contributed to Opération Nez Rouge (English: Operation Red Nose), a charity which aims to stop drunk-driving on the roads. Houle dedicated his win in Stage 16 of the 2022 Tour de France to his brother.

== Major results ==
2010
1st Time trial, National Under-23 Road Championships
2011
National Under-23 Road Championships

1st Road race
1st Time trial

3rd Overall Tour de Québec
2012
National Road Championships

1st Under-23 time trial
3rd Time trial

1st Overall Tour de Québec

1st Stage 3

1st Mountains classification, Coupe des nations Ville Saguenay
2nd Overall Tour de Beauce

1st Young rider classification

4th Road race, UCI Under-23 Road World Championships
2014
2nd Time trial, National Road Championships
2015 (2 pro wins)
1st Time trial, Pan American Games
1st Time trial, National Road Championships
2016
2nd Overall Tour de Beauce
2017
5th Overall Boucles de la Mayenne
2018
4th Overall Tour Poitou-Charentes en Nouvelle-Aquitaine
8th Overall Danmark Rundt
2019
5th Overall Arctic Race of Norway
2021 (1)
1st Time trial, National Road Championships
Combativity award Stage 10 Tour de France
2022 (1)
Tour de France

1st Stage 16
Combativity award Stage 16

2nd Overall Arctic Race of Norway
2023
3rd Maryland Cycling Classic
8th Overall Étoile de Bessèges
2025
2nd Road race, National Road Championships

=== Grand Tour general classification results timeline ===
Grand Tour	2015	2016	2017	2018	2019	2020	2021	2022	2023	2024	2025
Giro d'Italia	113	72	—	—	—	—	—	—	—	—	62
Tour de France	—	—	—	—	91	47	66	24	38	50	—
Vuelta a España	—	—	115	—	—	—	—	—	—	—	

Legend
—	Did not compete
DNF	Did not finish
