= Jaime Ramírez (cyclist) =

Colombian track and road cyclist

Personal information
- Full name: Jaime Ramírez Bernal
- Born: 20 January 1989 (age 37) Bogotá, Colombia

Cycling career
- Sport: Cycling
- Disciplines: Road; Track
- Role: Rider

Amateur teams
- 2013: En Cristo–IMRD de Chía
- 2014: Formesán–Bogotá Humana
- 2015: US Lamentin
- 2016: JB Ropa Deportiva

Professional teams
- 2008: Centri della Calzatura–Partizan
- 2017: Italomat–Dogo
Medal record
Representing Colombia
Men's track cycling
World Junior Championships
Bronze medal – third place	2007 Aguascalientes	Madison

Jaime Ramírez Bernal (born 20 January 1989) is a Colombian track and road cyclist.

== Career ==
Jaime Ramírez won the bronze medal in the Madison at the 2007 UCI Junior Track World Championships in Aguascalientes, Mexico, together with Edwin Ávila, behind the Russian and Australian teams. In 2008, he rode for the Italian-Serbian UCI Continental team Centri della Calzatura–Partizan. In 2013, he won the Tobago Cycling Classic.

== Major results ==
2007
3rd Madison, UCI Junior Track World Championships (with Edwin Ávila)
2011
7th Tobago Cycling Classic
2013
1st Tobago Cycling Classic
7th Overall Vuelta a Costa Rica
2015
6th Tobago Cycling Classic
2016
2nd Tobago Cycling Classic
