= Gervais Rioux =

Canadian bicycle racer

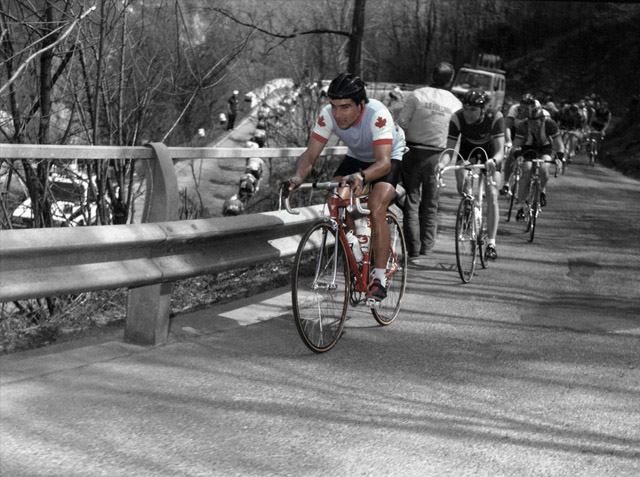

Personal information
- Full name: Gervais Rioux
- Born: November 17, 1960 (age 65) Mont-Joli, Quebec, Canada

Cycling career
- Sport: Cycling
- Disciplines: Road & Track
- Role: Rider (retired); Businessman

Professional teams
- 1983–1986: Bike Sport
- 1986: Bloor Cycle
- 1987–1988: Ten Speed Drive
- 1989–1990: Evian-Miko

Gervais Rioux (born 17 November 1960) is a Canadian former road bicycle racer. He rode at the 1988 Summer Olympics. Rioux is the owner of Argon 18.

== Professional Cycling career ==
From 1981 to 1990, Gervais Rioux represented Canada at major international events including the Commonwealth Games in 1982 and 1986 and the 1988 Summer Olympics in Seoul. Member of the Canadian Team throughout his senior career, Gervais Rioux took part in all the World Road Championships between 1981 and 1990. In all, he has accumulated more than 150 wins in some 1500 races and 18 years.

=== Honours ===
- Gervais Rioux was chosen athlete of the decade of the 1980s for the region of Eastern Quebec.
- In November 2008, he was inducted into the Quebec Cycling Hall of Fame.

== Palmarès ==
- 1977

27th place the Canada Games

- 1978

Winner of the unique selection event for the Junior World Road Championships
Winner of the Tour du Saguenay-Lac-Saint-Jean Junior

- 1979

Winner of the Tour du Saguenay-Lac-Saint-Jean Junior

- 1982

21st place at the Commonwealth Games
76th place at the World Road Championships

- 1983

Winner of the Tour of Luxembourg
Grand Prix de Vimy
27th position at the World Road Championships
3rd in Paris-Reims

- 1985

Winner of the Canadian Road Title
Winner of the Grand Prix Marc Blouin
Winner of two stages in the Mi-Août Bretonne
Grand Prix Toulon
33rd place at the World Road Championships

- 1986

19th place at the Commonwealth Games
Winner of the Grand Prix Marc Blouin
76th position at the World Road Championships

- 1987

Winner of the Canadian Road Title
Winner of the Grand Prix Val Bélair
Winner of the Nevada City Classic (second Canadian to ever win this event)
27th place at the World Championships

- 1988

73rd in the Olympic Games in Seoul (Note: Gervais Rioux rode more than 100 km in the race in a breakaway group of six riders: Swede Michel Lafis, Czechoslovak Loubos Lom, Algerian Sebti Benzine, Polish Zdzislaw Wrona, and South Korean Lee Jin-Ok.)
Winner of the Grand Prix de Beauce
Winner of the Canada Cup

- 1989

Winner of the Tour du Saguenay-Lac-Saint-Jean

- 1990

2nd place in the Tour of Martinique

In the United States he won the Coconut Grove, Key Biscayne and South Miami Classic races.

== Professional Cycling Teams ==
- Bike Sport (1983-1986)
- Bloor Cycle (1986)
- Ten Speed Drive (1987-1988)
- Evian-Miko (1989-1990)

== Bike shop and company ==
Since 1989 he is the owner of Cycles Gervais Rioux’s bike shop. Along with his brother Martin Rioux, he founded the bicycle manufacturing company Argon 18, which sells bikes in over 70 countries.
