= Tobago Cycling Classic =

Tobagonian one-day road cycling race

Race details
- Date: October
- Region: Tobago
- Local name: Tobago Cycling Classic
- Nickname: Tobago International
- Discipline: Road
- Competition: UCI America Tour (1.2)
- Type: One day race
- Web site: www.trinbagowheelers.com/content

History
- First edition: 1986
- Editions: 31 (as of 2017)
- First winner: Emile Abraham (TRI)
- Most wins: Emile Abraham (TRI) (3)
- Most recent: Peter Schulting (NED)

The Tobago Cycling Classic is a one-day road bicycle race held annually in Tobago, the smaller of the two main islands that make up the Republic of Trinidad and Tobago, in the Caribbean.

Created in 1986, at the beginning of October, for many years the race only featured local cyclists, but in 2000 opened to international riders. Formerly a stage race, since 2011 the race has been included on the UCI America Tour's calendar, carrying a one-day UCI rating of 1.2, and is also referred to as Tobago International.

== Past winners ==
Year	Country	Rider	Team
2001	Trinidad and Tobago	Emile Abraham	
2002	Trinidad and Tobago	Emile Abraham	
2003	Trinidad and Tobago	Emile Abraham	
2004	United States	John Lieswyn	Health Net–Maxxis
2005	Serbia	Ivan Stević	Aerospace Engineering Pro Equipe
2006	Canada	Bruno Langlois	AEG Toshiba-Jetnetwork Pro Cycling Team
2007	Germany	Andreas Henig	Atlas–Romer's Hausbäckerei
2008	New Zealand	Heath Blackgrove	Toyota–United Pro Cycling Team
2009	Great Britain	Peter Williams	CandiTV-Marshalls Pasta
2010	Canada	James Sparling	Canada -Team Exustar
2011	Austria	Riccardo Zoidl	RC Arbö–Gourmetfein–Wels
2012	Barbados	Darren Matthews	Barbados Cycling Union
2013	Colombia	Jaime Ramírez	Team Coco's
2014	Colombia	Óscar Pachon	Team Coco's
2015	Dominican Republic	Adderlyn Cruz	Inteja–MMR Dominican Cycling Team
2016	Canada	James Piccoli	PSL/RBC
2017	Netherlands	Peter Schulting	PSL
