= Geneviève Robic-Brunet =

Canadian cyclist

Geneviève Brunet
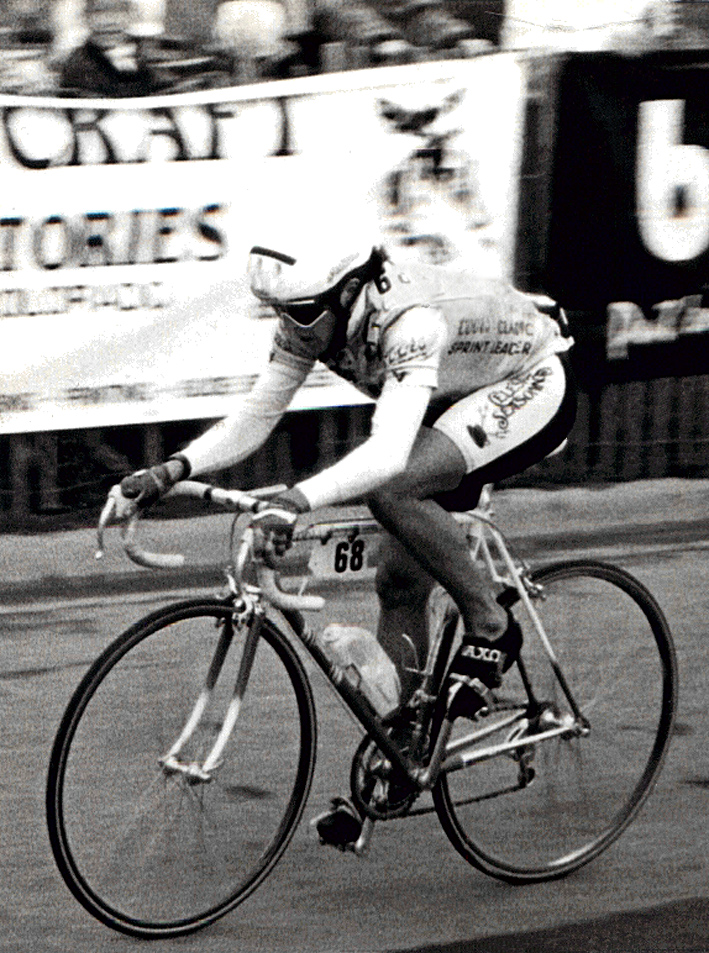

Personal information
- Full name: Geneviève Robic Brunet
- Born: 13 April 1959 (age 67) Montreal, Quebec, Canada
- Height: 162 cm (5 ft 4 in)
- Weight: 118 lb (54 kg)

Cycling career
- Sport: Cycling
- Discipline: Road
- Role: Rider

Amateur team
- 1979–1988: –

Professional teams
- –: Denver Spoke
- –: 7-Eleven
- –: Celestial Seasonings

Major wins
- National Championships, Coors Classic Stages, Ore-Ida Stages, European Classics and European Stages.

Geneviève Robic Brunet (born 13 April 1959) is a retired road racing cyclist from Canada. Genny was twice National Road Champion in 1984 and 1987, and twice National Criterium Champion those same years. She represented Canada at two consecutive Summer Olympics, starting in 1984. Training in New Mexico and then Colorado, Genny Brunet, resident of Pierrefonds, Quebec, ended up in 22nd place (Los Angeles Olympics 1984) and 4th place (Seoul Olympics 1988) in the Women's Individual Road Race. Her early retirement from cycling followed a training accident from which she could not fully recover.
