= Alison Testroete =

Canadian cyclist

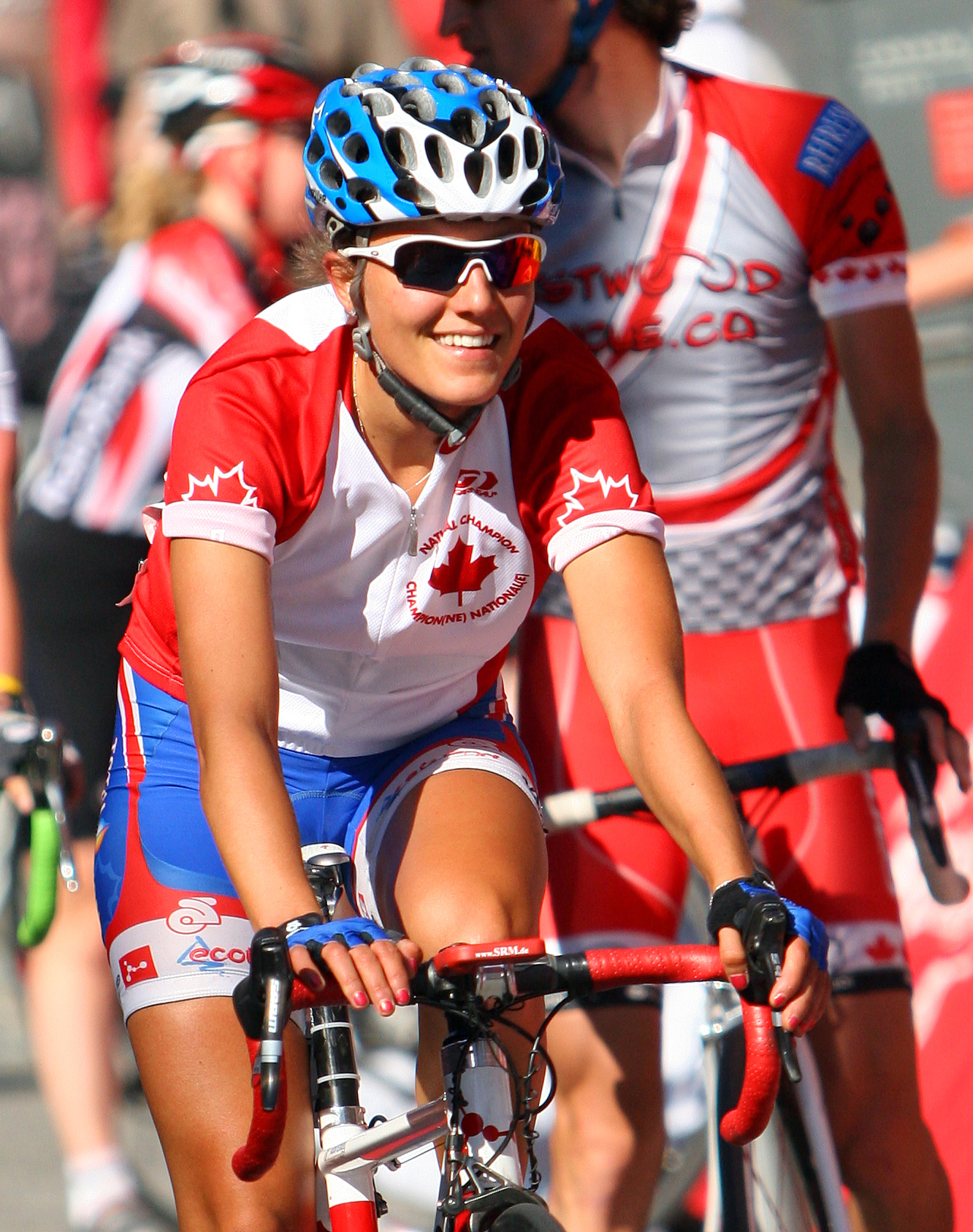
- Yaletown Gran Prix 2009

Personal information
- Born: 22 July 1983 (age 43) Canada

Cycling career
- Sport: Cycling
- Current team: retired
- Discipline: Road cycling

Professional teams
- 2007: Team Expresscopy.com
- 2008: Aarons
- 2010: Team Vera Bradley Foundation
- 2011: Skil-Koga

Major wins
- National Road Championships (2009)

Alison Testroete (born 22 July 1983) is a road cyclist from Canada. She represented her nation at the 2009 UCI Road World Championships.

== See also ==
- 2011 Skil Koga season
