= Garneau–Québecor =

Canadian cycling team

Team information
- UCI code: GQC
- Registered: Canada
- Founded: 2012
- Disbanded: 2017
- Discipline: Road
- Status: National (2012); UCI Continental (2013–2017)

Team name history
- 2012–2013 2014–2017: Team Quebecor Garneau; Garneau–Québecor

Garneau–Québecor was a Canadian UCI Continental cycling team established in 2012.

== Team roster ==
Rider	Date of birth
Olivier Brisebois (CAN)	12 April 1995 (age 31)
Félix Côté-Bouvette (CAN)	8 July 1993 (age 33)
Jean-Simon D'Anjou (CAN)	19 March 1996 (age 30)
Elliott Doyle (CAN)	20 January 1994 (age 32)

Rider	Date of birth
Geoffroy Dussault (CAN)	14 February 1996 (age 30)
Simon-Pierre Gauthier (CAN)	25 February 1993 (age 33)
Bruno Langlois (CAN)	1 March 1979 (age 47)
Jean-François Soucy (CAN)	5 September 1997 (age 29)

== Major wins ==
2012
Stages 7 & 8b (ITT) Vuelta a la Independencia Nacional, Bruno Langlois
Stage 6 Tour de Beauce, Bruno Langlois
Satge 6 Tour de Guadeloupe, Bruno Langlois
Prologue Tour du Rwanda, Rémi Pelletier-Roy
Stages 4 & 8 Tour du Rwanda, Bruno Langlois
2015
Stages 2 & 4 Grand Prix Cycliste de Saguenay, Bruno Langlois
2016
Stage 3b Tour de Beauce, Michael Rice
2017
Stage 4 Grand Prix Cycliste de Saguenay, Marc-Antoine Soucy
