= Tour de Québec =

Annual cycling race

The Tour de Québec is a road cycling stage race held on the Quebec city region. Created in September 2008 and now held annually in July. The event is for Pro-AM men, but other categories also compete; Juniors, masters and women.

== Winners ==
Year	Winner	Second	Third
2008	Guillaume Boivin (CAN)	Bruno Langlois (CAN)	Zack Garland (CAN)
2009	Josh Dillon (USA)	Otávio Bulgarelli (BRA)	Charles Dionne (CAN)
2010	Guillaume Boivin (CAN)	Jean-Sébastien Perron (CAN)	Derrick St. John (CAN)
2011	Bruno Langlois (CAN)	Shawn McCarthy (AUS)	Hugo Houle (CAN)
2012	Hugo Houle (CAN)	Bruno Langlois (CAN)	Antoine Duchesne (CAN)

Stage winners :

- Bruno Langlois (5)
- Charles Dionne (3)
- Guillaume Boivin (2)
- Thierry Laliberté (2)
- Pierre-Étienne Boivin
- Josh Dillon
- Aaron Fillion
- Zach Garland
- Michael Joanisse
- Derrick St. John
- Jordan Brochu
- Antoine Duchesne
- Hugo Houle
- Geoffroy Dusseault
