= CTIC =

CTIC may refer to:

- Center for the Development of Information and Communication Technologies in Asturias in Spain
- Central Taiwan Innovation Campus in Taiwan
- Counterterrorist Intelligence Center
- Conseil des technologies de l'information et des communications, the French name for the Information and Communications Technology Council in Canada
