= Global Relay =

Canadian technology company

- Company type: Private
- Founded: Vancouver, BC, Canada (June 2, 2000)
- Headquarters: Vancouver, BC, Canada
- No. of locations: 7 (Vancouver, New York City, Chicago, London, Singapore, Raleigh and Halifax)
- Area served: Worldwide
- Founders: Warren Roy (CEO); Duff Reid (COO)
- Key people: Eric Parusel (director and senior architect)
- Industry: Email archiving Computer software Regulatory compliance Instant messaging Software as a service Enterprise software
- Products: Global Relay Archive; Global Relay Search; Global Relay Message; Global Relay Intelligence & Practice (GRIP)
- Website: www.globalrelay.com

Global Relay is a technology services company providing software-as-a-service electronic message archiving (e.g., email archiving), instant messaging, compliance and supervision services with a focus on highly regulated industries. Global Relay is privately held and employee controlled, with no outside or venture funding.

== History ==
Global Relay was founded in 1999 by Warren Roy, Duff Reid and Eric Parusel. The company developed one of the first cloud email archiving services for use as a records management tool in the architecture, design and construction industries. Several years later, the company then shifted its focus to the financial sector and began selling its archiving services to broker-dealers, investment advisors, hedge funds and banks.

As email and other electronic messages increasingly became standard methods of business communication, a new market emerged for a secure way to retain such messages for business, legal and regulatory purposes. Beginning in 2001, accounting scandals at major US corporations such as Enron, Worldcom and Arthur Andersen brought regulatory compliance issues into sharper focus, not only for financial firms but also for public companies. In the wake of the scandals, regulators such as the SEC and the Financial Industry Regulatory Authority (FINRA), formerly (NASD), as well as the newly introduced Sarbanes-Oxley legislation, began requiring financial firms to have a system for electronic message recordkeeping and supervision – just the same as with paper records.

Global Relay built its customer base by combining technology with compliance, legal and audit/eDiscovery services. The company gained widespread adoption among banks, investment advisors, broker-dealers, hedge funds and private equity firms. In 2007, Global Relay entered into a worldwide exclusive partnership with Thomson Reuters for archiving and compliance of Thomson Reuters Messenger and Eikon.

As new message types were adopted in the financial industry, Global Relay developed the ability to capture and retain them for compliance. Public instant messaging (AOL Instant Messenger, Yahoo! Messenger, MSN Messenger, GoogleTalk) was the first such message type, followed by Bloomberg messaging, mobile messaging (BlackBerry and Android SMS, BlackBerry PIN and call logs), ICE Chat, CME/Pivot, and social media (LinkedIn, Twitter and Facebook). Each of these integrations, as well as the company's archiving system itself, was built in-house by Global Relay's development teams.

Global Relay markets Global Relay Archive both as a compliance necessity and as a tool to boost end-user productivity. Since the company's acquisition of a mobile software firm in 2008, it has released apps for every major mobile platform, including iPhone, iPad, BlackBerry and Android – allowing users to find and retrieve their own archived messages from any location.

Global Relay's strategy for the future centers upon its transition from offering only back office tools (such as message archiving) to also providing front office communication services. Global Relay Message is the company's cloud-based enterprise platform for instant messaging and collaboration, designed to meet the regulatory requirements of the finance industry. Global Relay is also in the process of developing the next generation of its core archiving product, which will provide increased scalability and the capacity to process and index the messaging data of companies with hundreds of thousands of users.

An additional key component of Global Relay's competitive strategy is the construction of its own data centers, allowing Global Relay to own and fully control all components of its technology stack, including software, workstations, servers, data centers, and property. Global Relay's 4-megawatt west coast data center is located in North Vancouver, British Columbia and has a capacity of 200 racks or 5000 servers. It is an environmentally friendly facility that employs evaporative cooling technology to eliminate the need for mechanical air conditioning, thereby dramatically reducing electricity usage.

== Business ==
Global Relay is a significant player in the cloud-based messaging and archiving industries. Recent articles cite its client base at over 18,000 including 22 of the world's 25 biggest banks and 61% of all US hedge funds. Global Relay's main competitor for cloud-based messaging and archiving is Symphony Communication.

As data security is paramount to Global Relay's financial customer base, the company annually engages KPMG to provide independent verification of the security and reliability of its internal controls.

== Services ==
- Global Relay Archive: a cloud-based archiving service providing capture, indexing and long-term preservation of electronic messages, including email, instant messaging (AOL Instant Messenger, MSN Messenger, Yahoo! Messenger, GoogleTalk), BlackBerry and Android mobile messaging, Bloomberg, Thomson Reuters, Pivot, ICE Chat, Microsoft Lync(formerly Microsoft Office Communicator), social media (LinkedIn, Twitter, Facebook), websites, Salesforce.com Chatter, Yammer and more. Global Relay Archive is designed to assist firms in complying with regulatory requirements such as those of U.S. Securities and Exchange Commission, FINRA, FSA, Sarbanes-Oxley, HIPAA, IIROC, MFDA, and others.
- Global Relay Search: mobile apps for end users to search and retrieve their own archived messages of any type. Global Relay Search is available for iPhone, iPad, BlackBerry and Android devices. A plug-in is also available for Microsoft Outlook.
- Global Relay Message: an enterprise-class platform for compliant instant messaging and collaboration. Global Relay Message includes instant messaging features such as presence, message receipts, chat rooms, disclaimers, ethical walls, and offline message support. It is designed with feature parity between its desktop and mobile clients (for iPhone, iPad, BlackBerry and Android devices). Global Relay Message is built using a protocol developed in-house by Global Relay.
- Global Relay Intelligence & Practice (GRIP): Launched in 2023, GRIP is a digital information service, allowing professionals to stay educated in technology and compliance advancements as well as industry trends.

== Awards ==
- Warren Roy, CEO of Global Relay and Shannon Rogers, president and general counsel, were selected by Ernst & Young as the 2013 Pacific Region Entrepreneurs of the Year in the Business-to-Business Products and Services category.
- Global Relay was ranked in the Deloitte Fast 500 (North America) and Fast 50 (Canada) listings of the fastest-growing technology companies for the third year running (2011 to 2013).
- Global Relay was named a Top Up-and-Coming Technology Company in the 2013 PwC Vision to Reality Awards.
- Global Relay president and general counsel, Shannon Rogers, was awarded the 2013 Western Canada General Counsel Business Achievement Award for excellence in the general counsel community and having successfully made the difficult transition from lawyer to senior executive directing a corporation.
- Warren Roy, CEO and founder, was named 2013 Person of the Year by the British Columbia Technology Industry Association in celebration of his business vision, leadership and entrepreneurial success.
- Global Relay received the 2013 Technology Impact Award (TIA) for Community Engagement from the British Columbia Technology Industry Association in recognition of its outstanding community impact, particularly as Title Sponsor and Operator of the Global Relay Gastown Grand Prix.
- Global Relay was named one of BC's Most Innovative Companies for 2013 by BC Business Magazine.
- President and general counsel, Shannon Rogers, was presented with a 2013 Influential Women in Business Award by Business in Vancouver magazine. This accolade recognizes Shannon's achievements in entrepreneurship, community involvement and in mentoring other women.
- Warren Roy, CEO and founder, was named BC CEO of the Year for 2012 by Business in Vancouver magazine in the category of "Private Company Under $50 Million
- Shannon Rogers, Global Relay president and general counsel was recognized as the number 1 Female Entrepreneur in Canada by Profit Magazine in their W100 ranking for 2011 and number 2 for 2013
- Shannon Rogers, Global Relay president and general counsel, was named a finalist in the 2012 RBC Canadian Women Entrepreneur Awards (CWEA).
- Global Relay was recognized as one of the "Best Companies to Work For in BC" for 2012 and 2011 by BCBusiness Magazine
- Global Relay was ranked by Business in Vancouver as the 12th largest software company in BC and the 19th Fastest Growing Software Company in BC for 2012.

== Community involvement ==
In January 2012, Global Relay announced a five-year, $1-million commitment to become the Title Sponsor and Operator of the Global Relay Gastown Grand Prix through 2016. The Global Relay Gastown Grand Prix is a professional cycling criterium race in Vancouver, British Columbia.

In November 2012, Global Relay introduced Global Relay Bridge the Gap, a philanthropic fund to support up-and-coming Canadian cyclists. Global Relay pledged $400,000 over four years to support cyclists between the ages of 19 and 25, providing funding for coaching, travel and equipment. Five veteran professional Canadian riders are board members for Global Relay Bridge the Gap: Ryan Anderson, Andrew Pinfold, Will Routley, Svein Tuft, and Erinne Willock.
