= Contentverse =

Document management system

- Developer: Computhink
- Initial release: 2013-10-08
- Stable release: 8.1
- Preview release: 8.2
- Operating system: Windows, Linux, Android
- Type: content management system, document management system
- License: Commercial proprietary software
- Website: www.contentverse.com

Contentverse is a document management system designed by Computhink, Inc. for use in businesses within various industries. Contentverse provides an in-depth filing structure for all files, including documents, images, PDF files, video, audio, and metadata. Documents can be scanned directly into the system or imported from other sources already on the hard drive, network, or cloud. Administrators have the ability to select which users have access to which data, and how they may interact with it. The software was originally released in 1998 as The Paperless Office. The name was changed to ViewWise in 2000 with the fourth major software update. With the launch of a new website built solely for the software in January 2013, the product was rebranded to Contentverse.

== Product features ==
Contentverse is document management software with features that allow businesses to streamline operations while maintaining accountability through integration document imaging and scanning, security, workflow and email archiving.

- Instant search and find allows users to categorize each document when imported according to the fields they choose. With the search function, any file or set of files can then be retrieved from within the database instantly.
- Version control creates a new version of a document every time it is saved. Users can go back to previous versions at any time.
- Annotations can be made with ease in the system. Highlighting, circling, comments and sticky notes can be saved to each page in a document as a layer which can be toggled.
- Redaction tools allow users to block out a region of a page and lock it with a password. This region can only be revealed by a user with the password.
- Automated data import features include importing indices and images from a pre-existing text, and importing a native file-format document or image file.
- Business process automation is central to the workflow feature in Contentverse, organizing the timeline of a project into a system similar to an assembly line. Each user in the line receives the document in order, adjusts it appropriately, and then it continues down the line until complete. Multiple users may work on a single task together or separate tasks simultaneously. The parameters of the workflow feature are decided by the administrator who creates it.
- Regulatory Compliance is offered through a retention module that allows the user to set reminders for any specific documents, enabling compliance.
- Web access allows access to the internet from a desktop, laptop, mobile devices, and tablets. Currently, Contentverse 8.1 is available on Apple computers through the Parallels program.
- Microsoft Office compatibility for documents imported into Contentverse in their current state. The program is designed to mimic some of the layout of Microsoft products, giving users a familiar interface.
- Audit Trail keeps a record of every action in Contentverse. Every addition, revision, and deletion of a document is tracked, monitored, and logged, even if the changes are executed by the administrator.

== Data security ==
Contentverse features a number of methods for keeping files secure within and outside of the program. The administrator decides which persons or groups of persons may view files. There is no way for a user to gain access to content which the admin has not exclusively given them permission to see. The files are kept in a storage server, or a number of storage servers, not on the individual interface devices. Administrators may choose which files are stored in which server as well.

Additionally, since content accessed through the Contentverse interface is not located on the computer or device itself, any viral or criminal intrusion would not have access to the files themselves. If an invasive force hacks through the server, while files are stored there, they are encrypted in layers.

== See also ==
- Document Management
- Enterprise Content Management
- Records Management
