= EQO =

EQO, eqo, or Eqo may refer to:

== eqo ==
- eqo, a terahertz nondestructive evaluation device manufactured by Smiths Detection

== Eqo ==
- Josue "Eqo" Corona, member of the 2019 Philadelphia Fusion season

== EQO ==
- EQO Communications, a winner of the British Columbia Technology Industry Association's Technology Impact Awards
- Encyclopaedia of the Qurʾān Online, online publication of the Encyclopaedia of the Qurʾān
