= Journaling =

Journaling may refer to:

- Electronic message journaling, tracking and retention of electronic communications
- Journaling file system, a technique in computer file systems to prevent corruption
- Journal therapy
- Writing therapy, a form of psychotherapy
- Writing in a diary
