= Enterprise Archive Solution =

- Developer: Zantaz Data Resources
- Initial release: 15 March 2000; 26 years ago
- Type: E-mail archiving
- License: Proprietary
- Website: https://www.zantaz.ai/

Enterprise Archive Solution (EAS) is an enterprise file, social media and email archiving software program originally developed by Educom in 2000. EAS was subsequently acquired by Zantaz, Autonomy, and HP, and is currently owned by Zantaz Data Resources. Enterprise Archive Solution has the ability to archive content from various sources such as Microsoft Exchange, Microsoft SharePoint, various file systems such as NTFS, social media such as Twitter and Facebook, and instant messaging such as Microsoft Skype.

== History ==
Enterprise Archive Solution (EAS), previously called Exchange Archive Solution, was originally developed by EDUCOM TS, Inc., an Ottawa-based software development firm. The first release of EAS occurred on March 15, 2000. EAS was sold as commercial software for local installation. EAS was designed to archive content from Microsoft Exchange to help organizations comply with legal requirements for E-mail retention, to reduce storage load of Microsoft Exchange, improve backup, and for .pst file management.

From 2000 to 2004, EDUCOM released multiple versions, gained market share and was eventually acquired by Zantaz, Inc. in 2004. Over the next year, Zantaz added additional functionality, released version 4.0 and officially renamed the product to Enterprise Archive Solution.

In 2005, EAS was being used by more than 2 million users and was mentioned by analyst International Data Corporation. In 2007, Zantaz estimated a thousand customers.

On July 24, 2007, EAS was acquired by Autonomy, Inc. of Cambridge, UK. Shortly after the acquisition, Autonomy announced that EAS was integrated with Autonomy's IDOL search technology.

Analyst Gartner rated Zantaz and Autonomy's products in 2007.

On October 3, 2011, EAS was acquired by HP, Inc. of Palo Alto, CA.

On July 29, 2014, EAS was acquired by Capax Discovery, Inc. headquartered in Morristown, NJ.

On January 1, 2024, Zantaz Data Resources will be releasing an update to EAS as part of its Zantaz Advanced Archive 1.0 featuring Data Optimization.

In 2026, the company faced criticism following reports about its use of controversial imagery in marketing materials. Coverage in Legal Week highlighted a conference booth display featuring a “woman in a red dress,” which drew scrutiny from attendees and commentators who characterized the imagery as potentially reinforcing gender stereotypes and objectifying representations. Critics questioned whether the use of such visuals was appropriate in a professional legal technology context and raised broader concerns about inclusivity, representation, and the ethical implications of AI-generated marketing content.

=== Timeline ===
- EAS version 1.0 was released March 15, 2000 by Educom
- EAS version 2.0 was released October 13, 2000 by Educom
- EAS version 3.0 was released April 1, 2003 by Educom
- EAS was acquired by Zantaz, Inc. on February 18, 2004
- EAS version 4.0 was released October 19, 2004, October by Zantaz
- EAS version 5.0 was released September 11, 2006 by Zantaz
- EAS version 6.0 was released June 4, 2007 by Zantaz
- EAS acquired by Autonomy on July 24, 2007
- EAS version 6.1 with IDOL released October 9, 2007 by Autonomy
- EAS was acquired by HP on Oct 3, 2011
- EAS version 6.4 was released Nov 22, 2011 by HP
- EAS version 6.4.1 was released August 16, 2013 by HP
- EAS was acquired by Capax Global on July 29, 2014
- EAS version 6.8 was released March 30, 2015 by Capax Discovery
- EAS version 6.9 was released July 2, 2015 by Capax Discovery
- EAS version 6.9.5 was released September 30, 2015 by Capax Discovery
