= Gastown Grand Prix =

Canadian criterium cycling race

Global Relay Gastown Grand Prix

Race details
- Date: July 8, 2026
- Region: Gastown, Vancouver, British Columbia, Canada. (North America)
- Discipline: Road
- Type: Criterium
- Organiser: Global Relay
- Web site: www.globalrelayggp.org

History
- First edition: 1973
- Editions: 34 (as of 2017)
- First winner: Bill Wild (Canada)
- Most wins: Ron Hayman (Canada) (3 wins); Verna Buhler (Canada) (3 wins); Gina Grain (Canada) (3 wins)
- Most recent: Eric Young (USA); Kendall Ryan (USA)

The Global Relay Gastown Grand Prix is a criterium cycling race held in Gastown, the oldest neighbourhood in Vancouver, British Columbia, Canada.

Founded by a local dentist and bike racer, Roger Sumner, in 1973, the Gastown Grand Prix regularly attracted professional riders from across the continent along with crowds of 20,000 to 30,000 spectators.

Following an eight-year hiatus from 1994 to 2001, the race returned in 2002 as the Tour de Gastown. During that period the race was part of BC Superweek, a series of nine races held over 10 days in July in the greater Vancouver area. Gastown ran until 2008 before once again stopping due to lack of sponsorship.

On January 27, 2012, Global Relay, a Gastown-based technology services firm announced that it would be Title Sponsor and Operator of the race for five years through 2016. The 29th edition of the race took place on July 11, 2012. It featured the largest winning prizes of any criterium in North America, with $40,000 in total prizes, including $15,000 to the top finishing male rider and $8,000 to the top female. 2013's race marked the 40th anniversary since the first race in 1973, and featured an increased total prize purse of $50,000.

== History ==
In 1973, a Vancouver dentist, Dr. Roger Sumner, came up with the idea to have a bike race in Gastown, the oldest neighbourhood in Vancouver. An accomplished bike racer himself, he wanted to organize a race that was easily accessible to the public to show them how spectacular top level bike racing in Canada could be. Sumner himself competed in the Gastown Grand Prix until 1978. He was later inducted into the BC Hall of Fame for his 30 years of service to the sport in the roles of racer, coach, manager and racing organizer. He died in 2000 after being hit by a car while riding his bike.

=== First race ===
The first Gastown Grand Prix was held in 1973. The race ended with Bill Wild, a sprinter, versus New Zealander and three-time Canadian National Road Champion Max Grace on the final lap. Wild won the race and took home a colour TV as first prize.

=== Early years ===
In the 1970s, winners of the Gastown Grand Prix included Bill Wild, Max Grace, Brian Keast, and David Watkins. By 1976, 122 elite cyclists from Canada and Mexico were signed up to race the GP. In 1977, racers from the US made their first appearance at the criterium by entering 25 riders in the race. One of these riders was 18-year-old Davis Phinney. Phinney later went on to become an Olympic medalist and winner of two stages of the Tour de France. In 1979, Canadian cyclist Alex Steida made his first appearance at the race as National Junior Track Champion. Steida hit a pedestrian during the race but there were no serious injuries. In 1980 Stieda, still a junior, took his first victory in Gastown in front of crowds that numbered in the 20,000s. Steida later became the first North American to earn the Yellow Jersey at the Tour de France.

=== Arrival of professional teams ===
The 1980s saw the arrival of the first professional racing category racers at the Grand Prix. Canadian Pro racer Ron Hayman of Vancouver won three titles at the GP. Hayman was one of only three Canadian Pros on the world circuit at this time. In 1982 he won again, beating out Steida who came second and Canadian National Team member Bernie Willock who placed third. Eric Heiden, the five time American gold medalist in speed skating, only managed fourth place in this exceptional field. In the 1980s, women cyclists began to establish themselves in the GP with the emergence of a Women's category. 1981 National Road Champion Verna Buhler of Canada won the first women's title in 1982. She went on to win two more titles in the next two years.

The Pro team of 7-11 dominated GP races in the mid to late 1980s with many podium results. Begun in 1981 as an amateur team, 7-11 become a Pro team in 1985. It raced at many Grand Tours of Europe. First place results were taken at the GP during the 80's by team members Brian Walton, Alex Stieda and Norm Alvis.

=== 1990s: youth vs. experience ===
The 1990s saw some young and relatively inexperienced riders winning the GP over older and more established racers. Many younger riders saw the GP as a great opportunity to compete against more seasoned professional racers. One of these was twenty-year-old John Mckinley, who won the race in 1992. A 19-year-old US racer named Jonas Carney also won the event in 1990.

In 1991, another 19-year-old won the race. This was Lance Armstrong, who made his appearance at the GP as an amateur racer. He won the race, dropping his breakaway companion (Matt Eaton, who placed second) on the last lap.

Many times a medalist at Olympic and World mountain bike events, Canadian Alison Sydor also rode her first GP in 1991 and won the women's race. Sydor went on to race in many other future GTGP events. In 1993, the Pro team of Coors Light dominated the GP. Sprint specialist Roberto Gaggiolli won with Swedish World Road champion Marianne Berglund victorious in the women's race. Clara Hughes, Leslie Tomlinson and Sara Neil are notable Canadian women racers who rode in the GP in the early 1990s.

The GTGP took a nine-year hiatus in 1994 after not being able to secure sponsorship.

=== Big name riders draw crowds ===
The event returned in 2002 attracting 28,000 people to the streets of Gastown. With $10,000 up for prize money, Mark McCormack of the Saturn Pro team won ahead of Canadian Olympian Svein Tuft. The Saturn Team was one of the top three Pro US teams at this time and its racers dominated the race. Kim Davidge, also riding for Saturn, won the women's race. In 2003, Germany’s Ina Teutenberg, one of the premier woman sprinters in the world at this time, held off Alison Sydor to win the race. Thirty-five-year-old Gord Fraser was victorious in the men's event coming first out of 137 other riders.

US track team member for the 2000 Sydney Olympics, Jonas Carney of US came back to the GTGP in 2004 and won the race for a second time. He first won the GP fourteen years earlier in 1990 as a 19-year-old. Manon Jutras, 1994 Canadian Olympic road team member was victorious in the women's event.

Other highlights of the mid-2000s include the appearance of the UCI Continental Symmetrics cycling team at the GTGP. The team was composed wholly of Canadian riders like Svein Tuft, Andrew Pinfold and Eric Wohlberg. By 2006, the GTGP was attracting 40,000 spectators and was offering $15,000 in prize money. Gord Fraser was a double GTGP winner with victories in 2003 and 2005. Also in 2005, Gina Grain burst onto the scene and won the first of three career victories at the GP. Her other first place wins were to come in 2006 and 2008. Grain used the 2008 race as preparation for the Beijing Olympics, which were going to be held two weeks after the Gastown race. Many other riders also used the GP as final preparation for the Olympics. Sprinter Andrew Pinfold of the Symmetrics team, with the help of his Olympic bound teammate Svein Tuft and seven other teammates, won the 50 lap men's race by only a bike length.

=== Return of sponsorship ===
In 2009, the race again took another hiatus as it was without sponsorship until 2012, when Global Relay, a Gastown-based technology services firm, made a multi-year commitment to become title sponsor and operator, bringing the race back to Vancouver once again for the 2012 cycling season and beyond. The 2013 race was won by American Ken Hanson and Canadian Leah Kirchmann, both of the Optum-Kelly Benefit Strategies team.

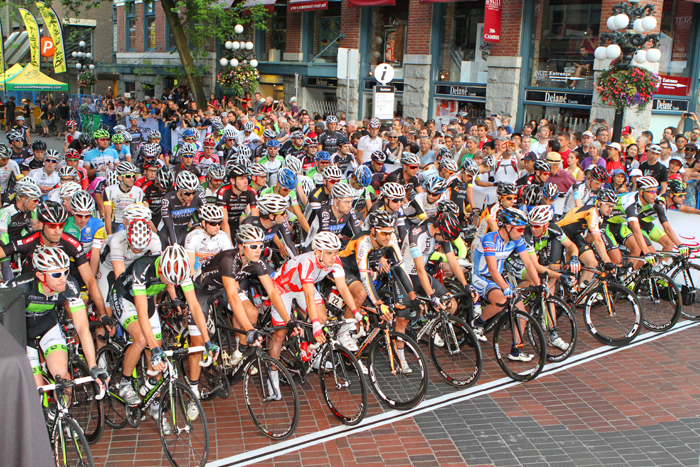
Starting line of the 2012 Global Relay Gastown Grand Prix - Men's Race

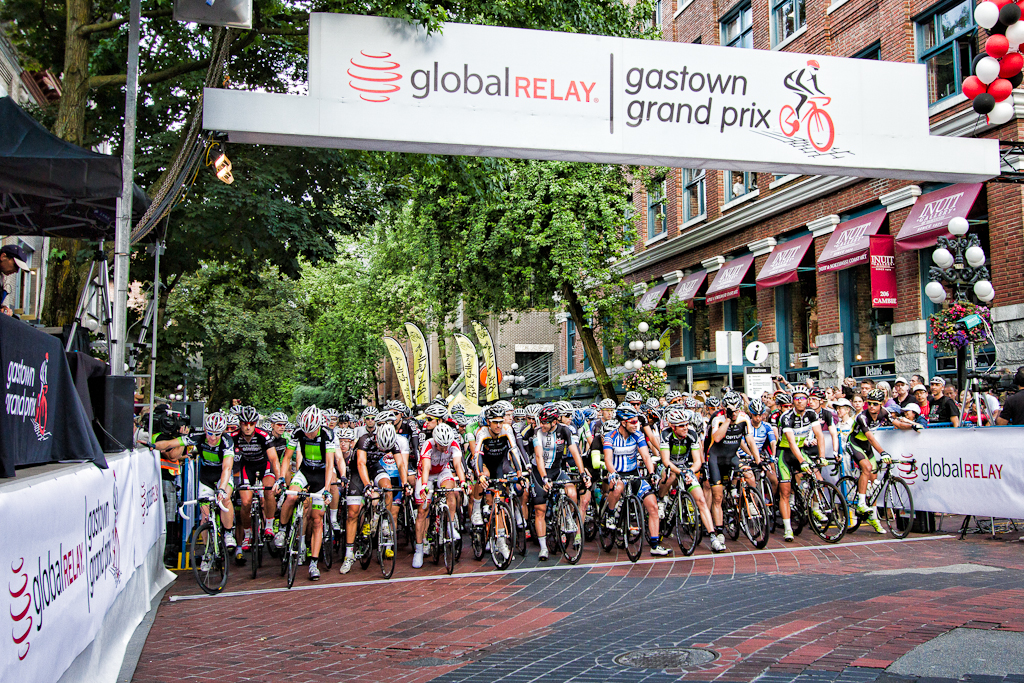
Starting line of the 2012 Global Relay Gastown Grand Prix - Men's Race

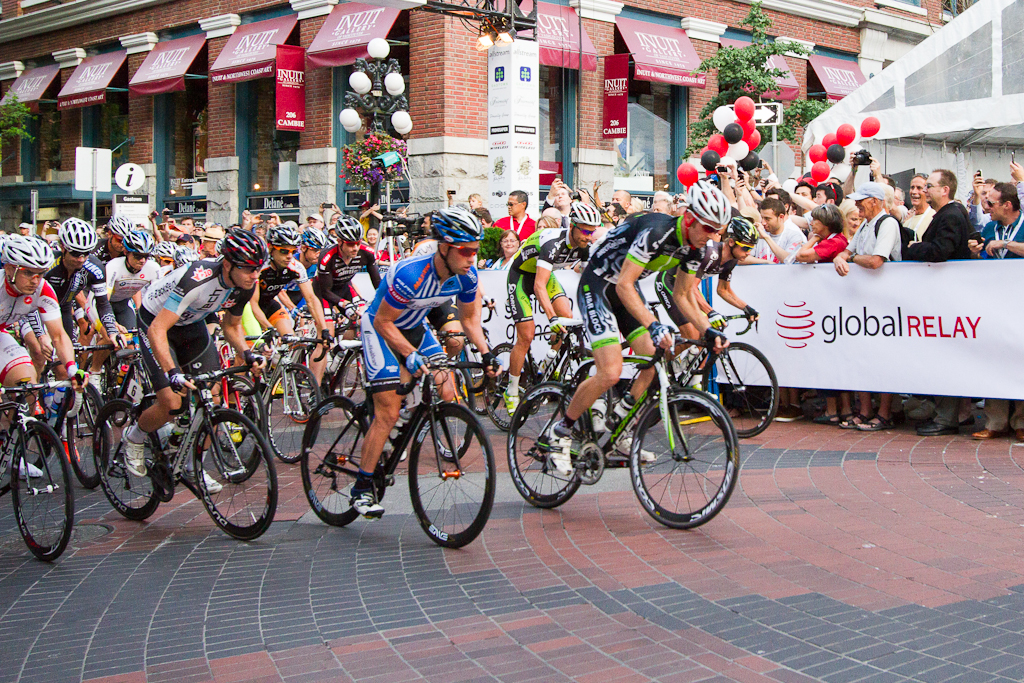
The 2012 Global Relay Gastown Grand Prix Men's Race begins

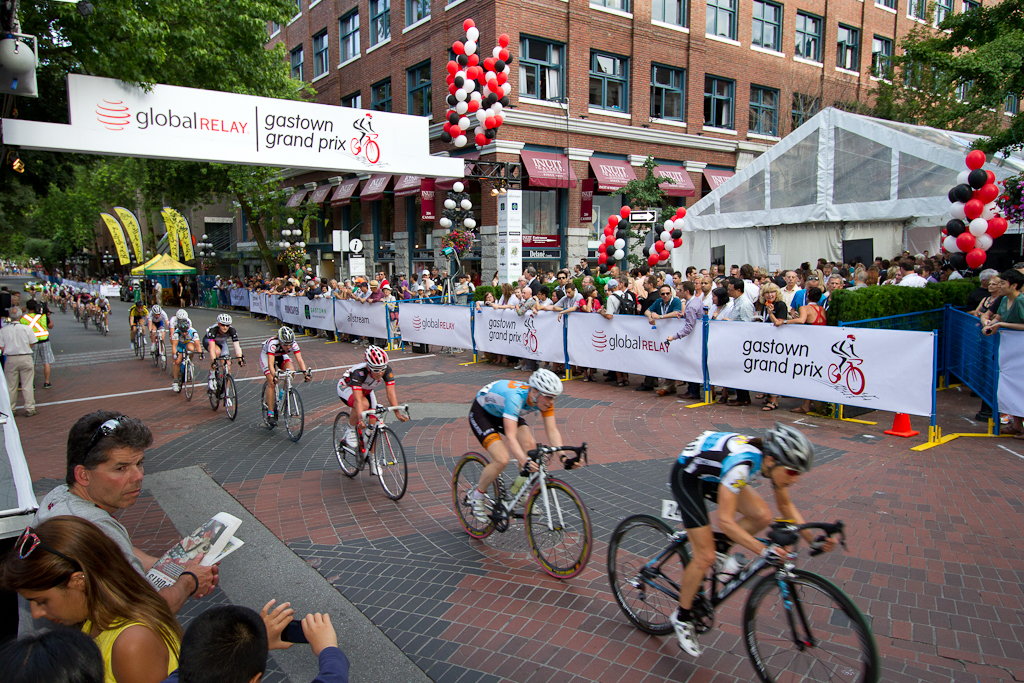
Riders in the 2012 Global Relay Gastown Grand Prix Men's Race

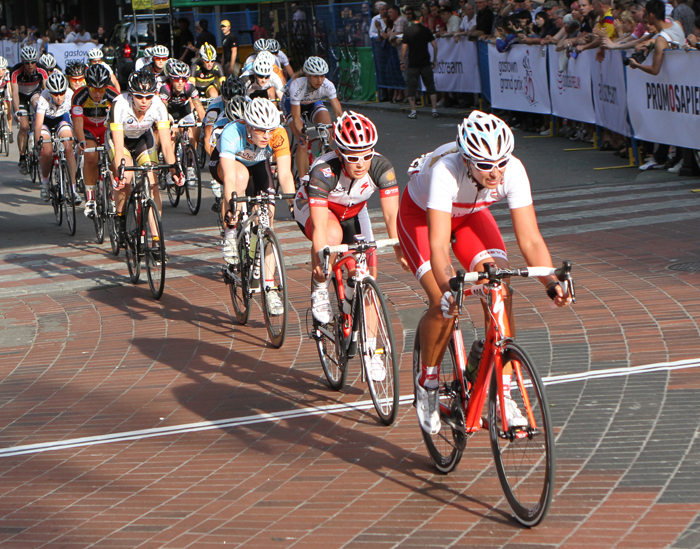
Starting line of the 2012 Global Relay Gastown Grand Prix - Women's Race

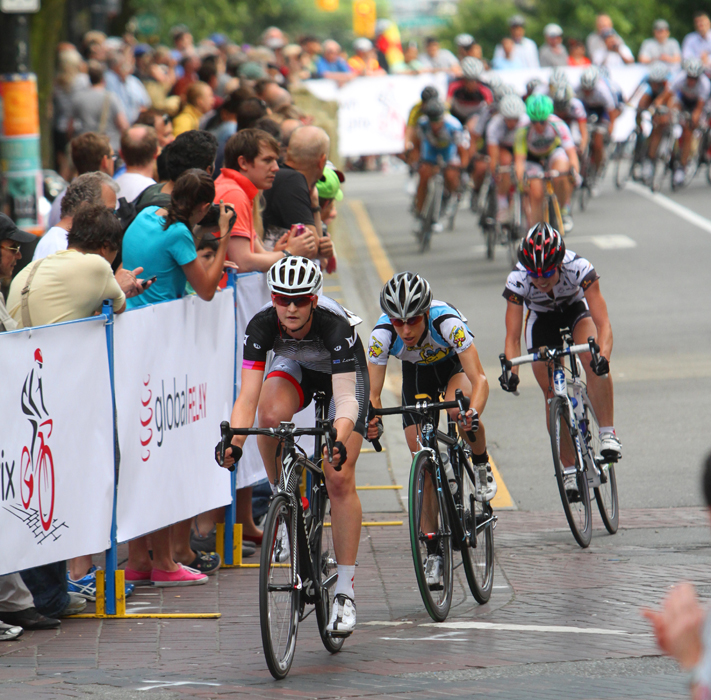
Competitors in the 2012 Global Relay Gastown Grand Prix - Women's Race, including Loren Rowney (2012 Champion)

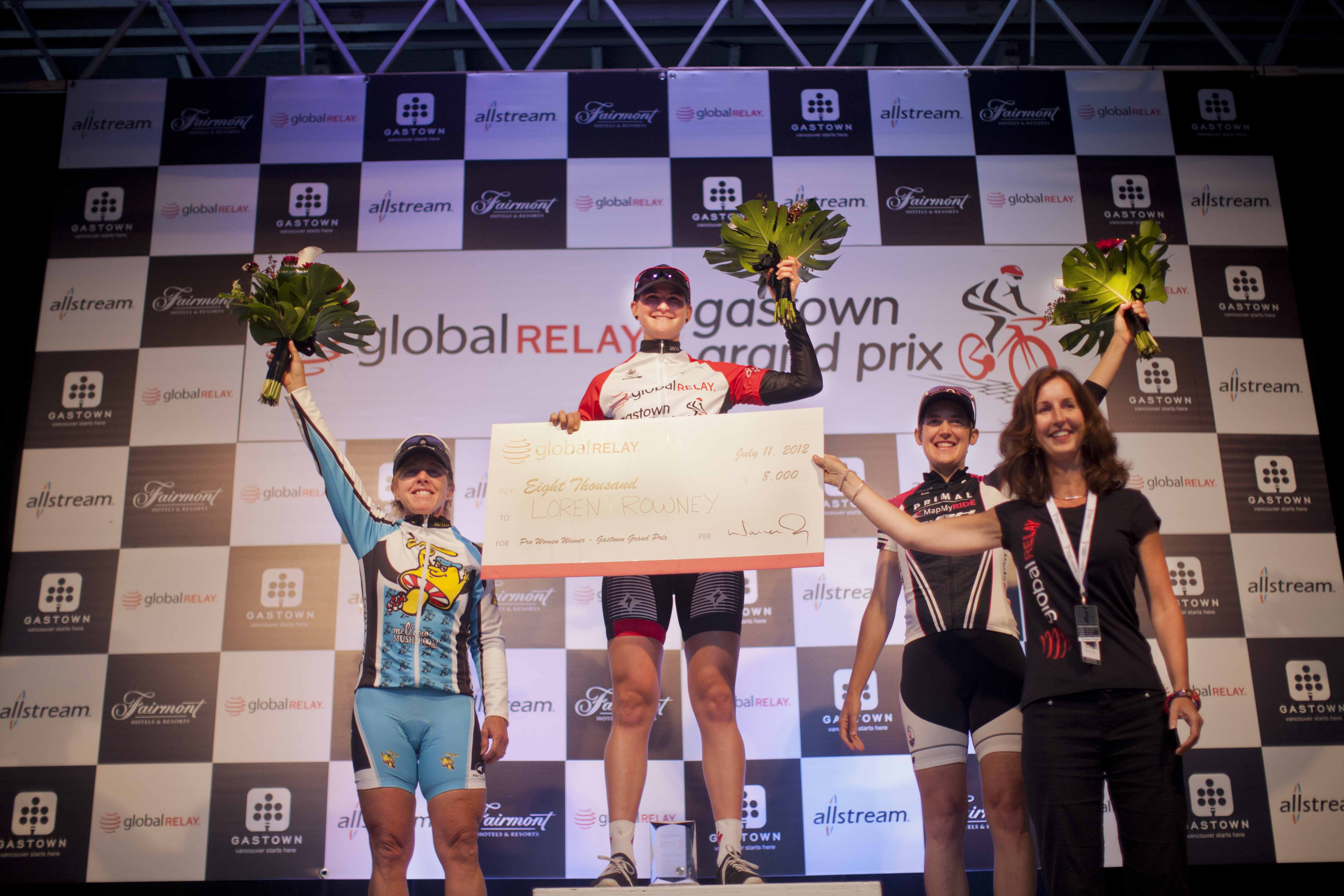
Women's podium at the 2012 Global Relay Gastown Grand Prix. From left: Laura Van Gilder (Mellow Mushroom), Loren Rowney (Specialized Lululemon), Nicky Wangsgard (Primal/MapMyRide p/b BH), Shannon Rogers (Global Relay President & General Counsel)

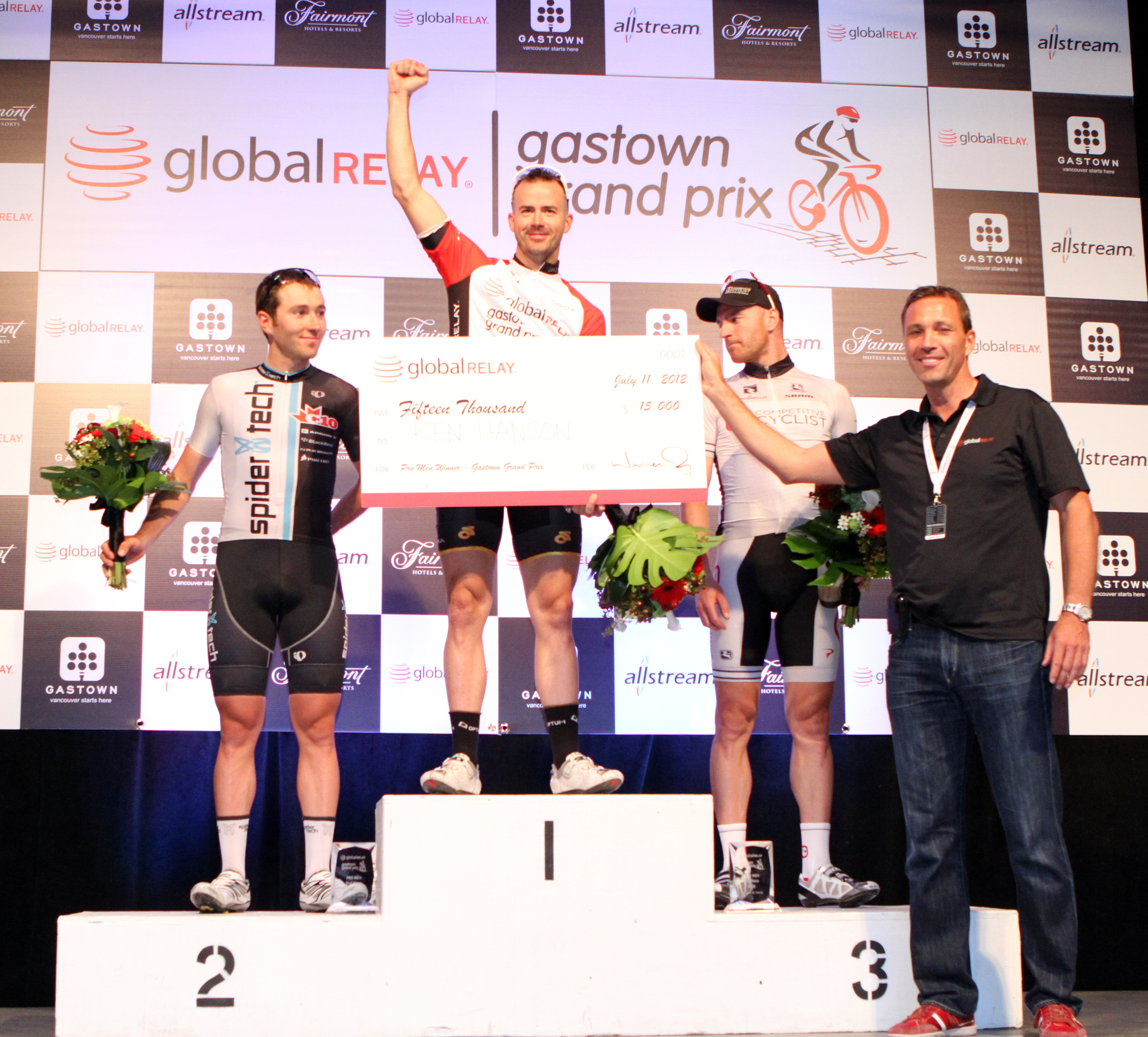
Men's podium at the 2012 Global Relay Gastown Grand Prix. From left: Ryan Anderson (Spider Tech), Ken Hanson (Optum p/b Kelly Benefit Strategies), Tommy Nankervis (Competitive Cyclist), Warren Roy (Global Relay CEO)

== Winners - Men's Race ==
Year	Winner	Hometown	Team
2025	Lucas Bourgoyne (USA)	Houston, Texas	Team Cadence Cyclery
2024	Tyler Stites (USA)	Tucson, Arizona	Project Echelon Racing
2023	Riley Pickrell (Canada)	Victoria, British Columbia	NSN Cycling Team
2019	Regan Gough (New Zealand)	Waipukurau	Cycling New Zealand
2018	Eric Young (USA)	Boulder, Colorado	Human Powered Health
2017	Eric Young (USA)	Boulder, Colorado	Human Powered Health
2016	Eric Young (USA)	Boulder, Colorado	Human Powered Health
2015	Ryan Roth (Canada)	Kitchener, Ontario	Silber Pro Cycling Team
2014	Luke Keough (USA)	Sandwich, Massachusetts	UnitedHealthcare
2013	Ken Hanson (USA)	Santa Barbara, California	Human Powered Health
2012	Ken Hanson (USA)	Santa Barbara, California	Human Powered Health
2008	Andrew Pinfold (Canada)	Woodbridge, ON	Symmetrics
2007	Kirk O'Bee (USA)	Ada, Michigan	Health Net p/b Maxxis
2005	Gord Fraser (Canada)	Nepean, Ontario	Health Net
2006	Hilton Clarke (Australia)	Victoria, Australia	Navigators
2004	Jonas Carney (USA)	Milwaukee	Wildlife Generation Pro Cycling
2003	Gord Fraser (Canada)	Nepean, Ontario	Health Net
2002	Mark McCormack (USA)	Plymouth, Maine	Saturn
1993	Roberto Gaggioli (Italy)	Limite S'Amo, Italy	Coors Light
1992	John McKinley (USA)	Sacramento, California	Spago
1991	Lance Armstrong (USA)	Austin, Texas	Subaru/Montgomery
1990	Jonas Carney (USA)	Milwaukee	Subaru/Montgomery
1989	Norm Alvis (USA)	Sacramento, California	7-Eleven
1988	Brian Walton (Canada)	North Delta, BC	7-Eleven
1987	Gary Anderson (New Zealand)	Wanganui, New Zealand	Cyclesport NZ/GENL M
1986	Andy Paulin (USA)	San Diego	10 Speed Drive
1985	Chris Carmichael (USA)	San Francisco	7-Eleven
1984	Alex Stieda (Canada)	Coquitlam, BC	7-Eleven
1983	Ron Hayman (Canada)	Vancouver, BC	7-Eleven
1982	Ron Hayman (Canada)	Vancouver, BC	7-Eleven
1981	Ron Hayman (Canada)	Vancouver, BC	7-Eleven
1980	Alex Stieda (Canada)	Coquitlam, BC	
1979	David Watkins (Canada)	Port Moody, BC	Grab On/Chinook
1978	Brian Keast (Canada)	Port Coquitlam, BC	
1977	Lawrence Malone (USA)	San Francisco	
1976	Bill Wild (Canada)	Port Moody, BC	
1975	Brian Keast (Canada)	Port Coquitlam, BC	
1974	Max Grace (Canada)	Vancouver, BC	
1973	Bill Wild (Canada)	Port Moody, BC	

== Winners - Women's Race ==
Year	Winner	Hometown	Team
2025	Fiona Majendie (Canada)	Vancouver, Canada	Instinct Racing Team
2024	Skylar Schneider (USA)	Milwaukee, Wisconsin	Miami Blazers Pro Cycling
2023	Kendall Ryan (USA)	Thousand Oaks, California	L39ION of Los Angeles
2019	Kendall Ryan (USA)	Thousand Oaks, California	EF Education–Tibco–SVB
2018	Kendall Ryan (USA)	Thousand Oaks, California	EF Education–Tibco–SVB
2017	Kendall Ryan (USA)	Thousand Oaks, California	EF Education–Tibco–SVB
2016	Tina Pic (USA)	Santa Fe, New Mexico	Happy Tooth Women's Racing
2015	Denise Ramsden (Canada)	Hay River, Northwest Territories	Trek Red Truck Racing p/b Mosaic Homes
2014	Leah Kirchmann (Canada)	Winnipeg, Manitoba	Human Powered Health
2013	Leah Kirchmann (Canada)	Winnipeg, Manitoba	Human Powered Health
2012	Loren Rowney (Australia)	Gold Coast, Australia	Velocio–SRAM Pro Cycling
2008	Gina Grain (Canada)	Burnaby, BC	Webcor Builders
2007	Erinne Willock (Canada)	Victoria, BC	Expresscopy.com
2006	Gina Grain (Canada)	Burnaby, BC	Colavita Cooking Light
2005	Gina Grain (Canada)	Burnaby, BC	Victory Brewing
2004	Manon Jutras (Canada)	Drummondville, Quebec	Quark
2003	Ina-Yoko Teutenberg (Germany)	Düsseldorf, Germany	Saturn
2002	Kim Davidge (Canada)	Burlington, Ontario	Saturn
1993	Marianne Berglund (Sweden)	Sweden	
1992	Laura Charameda (USA)	San Diego	Team Body Wise
1991	Alison Sydor (Canada)	North Vancouver, BC	
1990	Sara Neil (Canada)	Vancouver, BC	
1988	Aine O'Hagen (Canada)	White Rock, BC	
1987	Elizabeth Jansen (USA)		
1986	Becky Brindle (USA)	Snohomish, Washington	
1985	Peggy Maas (USA)	Colorado Springs, Colorado	Metros
1984	Doreen Smith (Canada)	Delta, BC	
1983	Verna Buhler (Canada)	Manitoba	
1982	Verna Buhler (Canada)	Manitoba	
1981	Verna Buhler (Canada)	Manitoba	
1979	Dawne Deeley (Canada)	British Columbia	
