= Palace letters =

Documents relating to the dismissal of Gough Whitlam

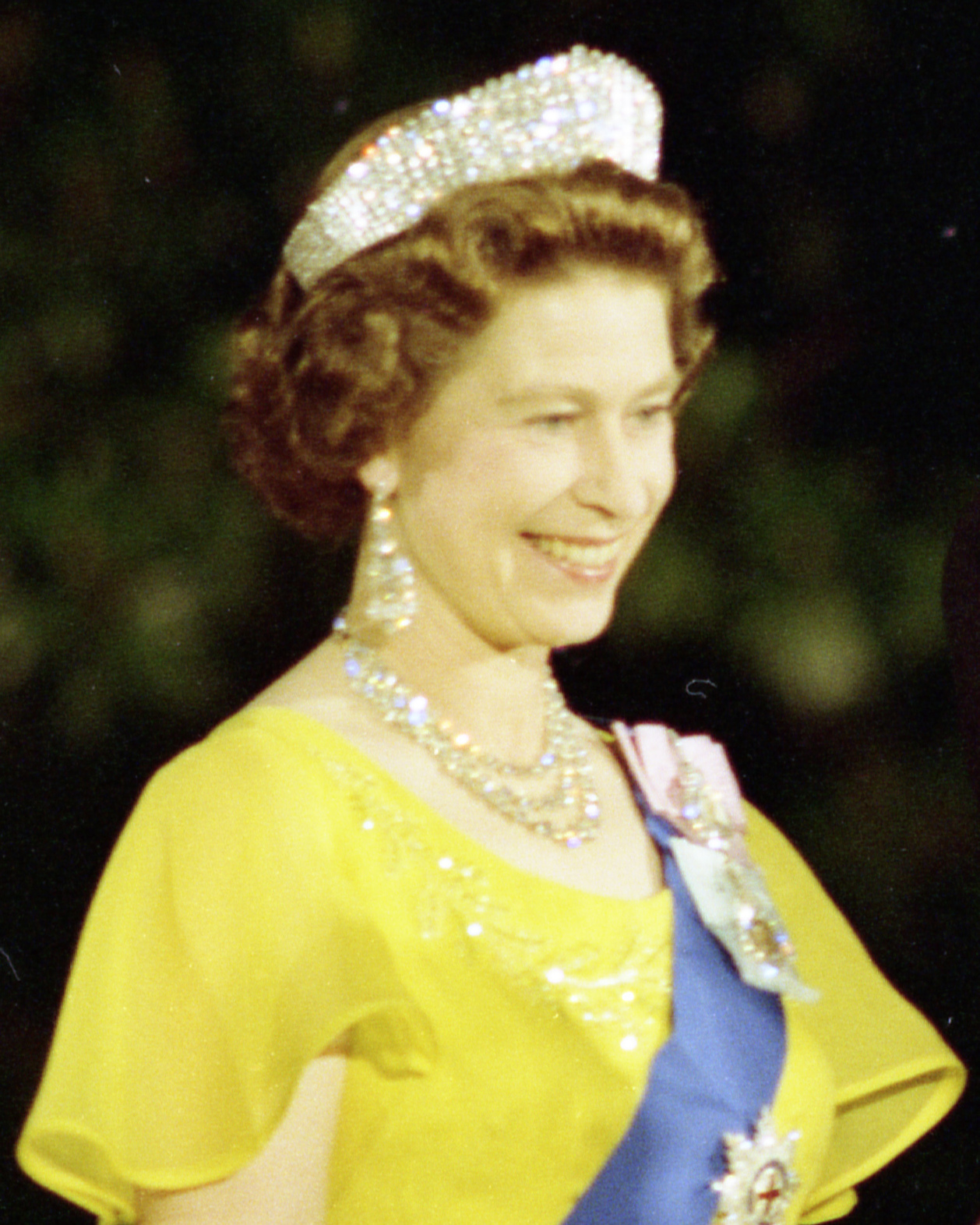
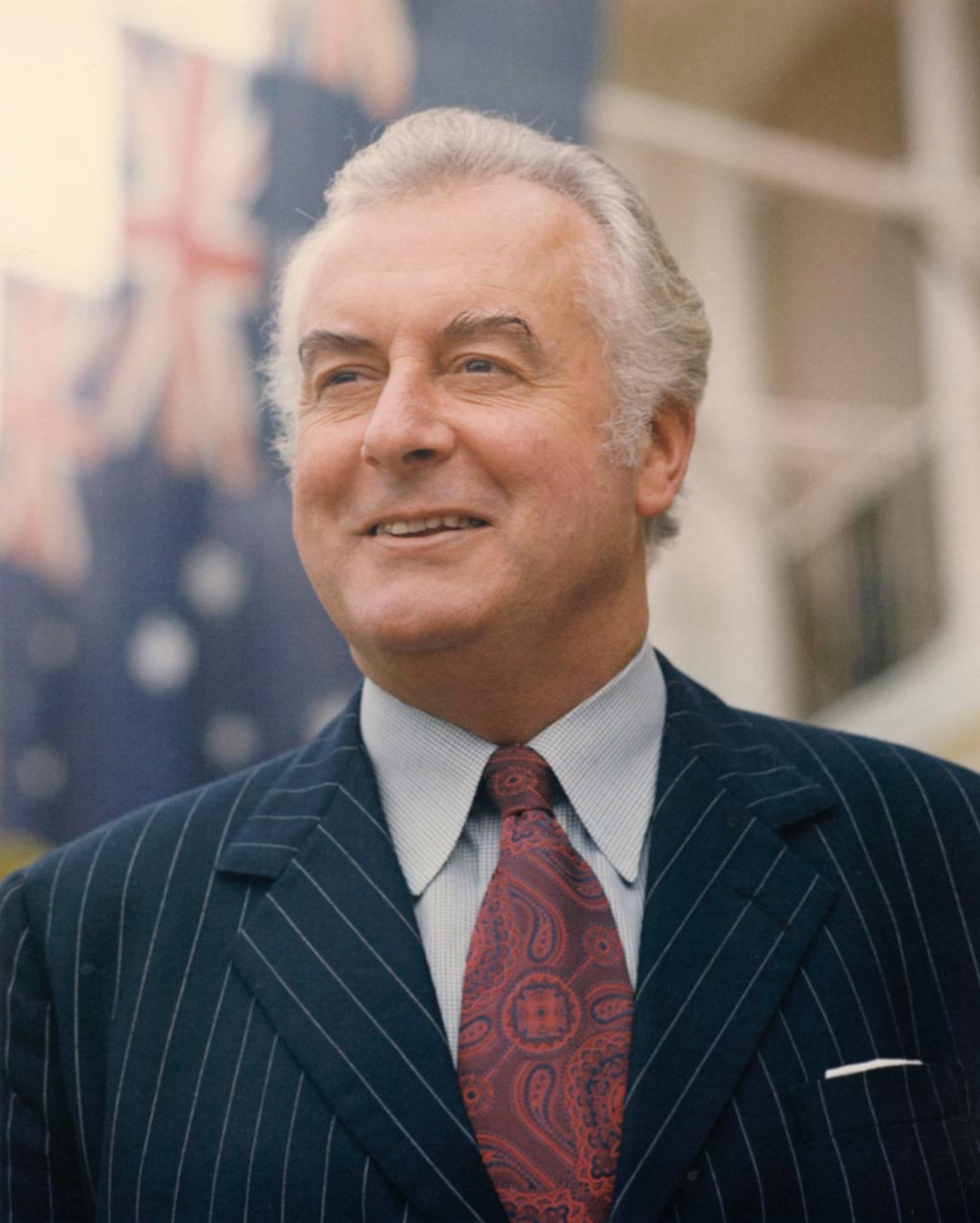
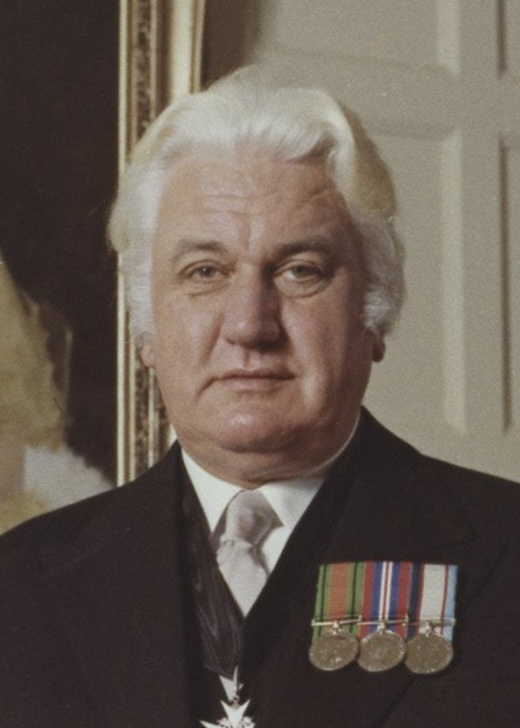
From left to right: Queen Elizabeth II, Gough Whitlam, Sir John Kerr.

The Palace letters, sometimes labelled as the Palace papers, were letters between Queen Elizabeth II, through her Private Secretary Martin Charteris, and Australian Governor-General Sir John Kerr around the time of the 1975 constitutional crisis, in which Kerr dismissed Australian Prime Minister Gough Whitlam. The phrase 'Palace letters' originated in the work of Australian historian and Whitlam biographer Professor Jenny Hocking, who successfully overturned the Queen's embargo over these letters, as a reference to Buckingham Palace, the official residence of Elizabeth in London.

Kerr's copies of these letters are held by the National Archives of Australia, which would ordinarily have made them publicly accessible after 30 years as provided by the Archives Act. However, the letters arrived at the Archives as a voluntary deposit of personal papers and access was therefore subject to terms set down by Kerr, which meant that public access was denied according to an embargo placed over them by the Queen until at least 2027 and after that date until permitted by the Queen's private secretary.

In 2016, Professor Jenny Hocking, having been refused access to the letters, sued the National Archives for their release, arguing that the letters were 'Commonwealth records' not 'personal' and they should therefore be available for public access 31 years after their creation according to the provisions of the Archives Act 1983. In 2020, the High Court of Australia found in Hocking's favour in a 6–1 decision and ruled that these documents should be accessible to the Australian public as Commonwealth records, and ordered the Director-General of the National Archives to reconsider Hocking's request. The High Court also issued three cost orders against the National Archives directing it to pay Professor Hocking's costs. The National Archives had spent a total of $1.6 million unsuccessfully contesting Hocking's case seeking public access to the Palace letters. The letters were made public, in full and online, on 14 July 2020.

== Background ==
In October 1975, the Opposition (Liberal/National-Country party coalition) used its control of the Australian Senate to defer passage of appropriation bills (needed to finance government expenditure), that had been passed by the Australian House of Representatives. The Opposition stated that they would continue their stance unless Whitlam called an election, subsequently urging Governor-General Sir John Kerr to dismiss Whitlam unless he agreed to their demand. Whitlam believed that Kerr would not dismiss him, and Kerr did nothing to disabuse Whitlam of this notion. On 11 November 1975, Whitlam intended to call a half-Senate election which was due at that time in an attempt to break the deadlock. When he went to Government House for an agreed meeting with Kerr to sign the final paperwork for the election, Kerr instead dismissed him as Prime Minister and shortly thereafter installed in his place Malcolm Fraser, the Leader of the Liberal Party of Australia and Leader of the Opposition.

Queen Elizabeth II and her Australian representative Governor-General Sir John Kerr exchanged more than 200 letters, which are now held in the National Archives of Australia. If they were Commonwealth records, they would ordinarily have been made public in 2006, 31 years after they were created. However, the letters were designated 'personal' records and were under the embargo of the Queen until at least 2027, with either the Queen's private secretary or the Governor-General's official secretary able to veto the release of the letters thereafter. Public access to the letters was therefore barred by the National Archives, which claimed that they were 'personal' papers and not Commonwealth records, and therefore did not come under the Australian Archives Act 1983.

== Legal challenge ==
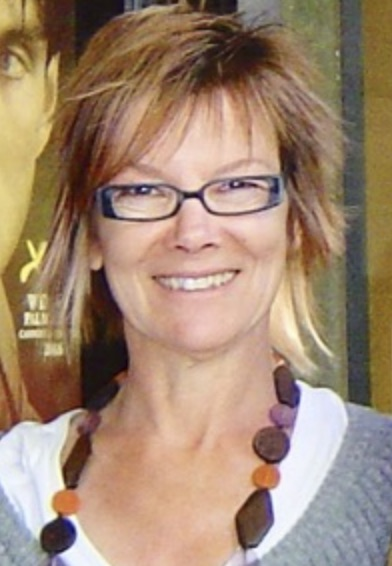
Professor Jenny Hocking of Monash University (2006)

In 2016, Hocking commenced proceedings in the Federal Court of Australia against the National Archives of Australia seeking the release of secret correspondence between Sir John Kerr and the Queen regarding the dismissal of the Whitlam government.

In 2020, Hocking revealed that there were more than 200 'Palace letters'. They cover the bulk of Kerr's term in office, from 15 August 1974 to 5 December 1977, and it was an agreed fact in Hocking's Federal Court action that most of them "address topics relating to the official duties and responsibilities of the Governor-General" and some "take the form of reports to The Queen about the events of the day in Australia". There had been a long debate regarding whether the Queen might have known about the machinations of the dismissal, and it was thought that the contents of the 'Palace letters' could clarify and possibly settle that issue.

The case was at first unsuccessful in the Federal Court and in February 2019 an appeal to the Full Court of the Federal Court was rejected by a majority. In a strong dissenting judgment, Justice Flick found that the Palace letters were Commonwealth records and, further, that it was "difficult to conceive of documents which are more clearly 'Commonwealth records' and documents which are not 'personal' property" than the Palace letters. He described the letters as concerning "'political happenings' going to the very core of the democratic processes of this country".

In January 2020, Sir Edward Young, Elizabeth's private secretary stated a preference for "all vice-regal letters to remain sealed until at least five years after her reign ends and for him to maintain a sole veto on whether they should be released at all".

On 29 May 2020, the High Court of Australia ruled that the Palace letters were now under the control of the National Archives and therefore must be considered as records that are the property of the Commonwealth, and "Commonwealth records" for the purposes of the Archives Act, and ordered the Director-General of the National Archives to reconsider Professor Hocking's request for access to the letters which it had previously denied. National Archives Director-General David Fricker immediately stated that "We accept the High Court's judgment and will now get to work examining these historically significant records for release under the provisions of the Archives Act...The National Archives is a pro-disclosure organisation. We operate on the basis that a Commonwealth record should be made publicly available, unless there is a specific and compelling need to withhold it." He nevertheless added the caveat that "some records may not be released, as exemptions for things like national security still play a role".

The letters were made public, in full and online, on 14 July 2020.

In January 2022, the National Archives of Australia released a further cache of over 2,000 pages of vice-regal correspondence between six other governors-general and the Queen, from Lord Casey in 1966 to Sir William Deane in 2001, as a result of the High Court's ruling in the Palace letters case. These showed that Kerr had written far more extensively than past governors-general.

== Content of the letters ==
Hocking's book The Palace Letters cites a key letter from Charteris of 2 October 1975 which shows that 'the Queen, Prince Charles, and [Sir Martin] Charteris were all aware by September 1975 that Kerr was considering dismissing the government and knew of his failure to warn Whitlam of that possibility. The letters revealed that Kerr had discussed the prospect of dismissing the government with Prince Charles and the Queen, several weeks before he did so, and that he was prepared to disregard the draft legal background of the Australian solicitor-general, Sir Maurice Byers that rejection of supply does not "[compel] the Crown's representative ... to intervene". The view of the palace, communicated to Kerr, was that the reserve powers did exist and that Kerr had the power to use them despite the law officers' draft background to the contrary, but did not encourage or advise Kerr on whether to use them. Despite these revelations the Palace itself continues to deny that it played 'any part' in Kerr's decision to dismiss the Whitlam government. Professor Frank Bongiorno however has concluded, as have others, that 'the Palace was indeed a player'.

The letters released in January 2022 revealed Kerr's private hostility towards the Whitlam government, including criticism of its policies and appointments. During the 1975 crisis, Kerr wrote to the monarch asking for advice about the possible use of reserve powers to dismiss the government.

After Kerr had dismissed Whitlam, he wrote to the palace that he had not warned Whitlam of his intention to dismiss him because he feared that Whitlam would dismiss him as Governor General first.
