= National Archives of Australia =

Official repository of documents from the Australian Government

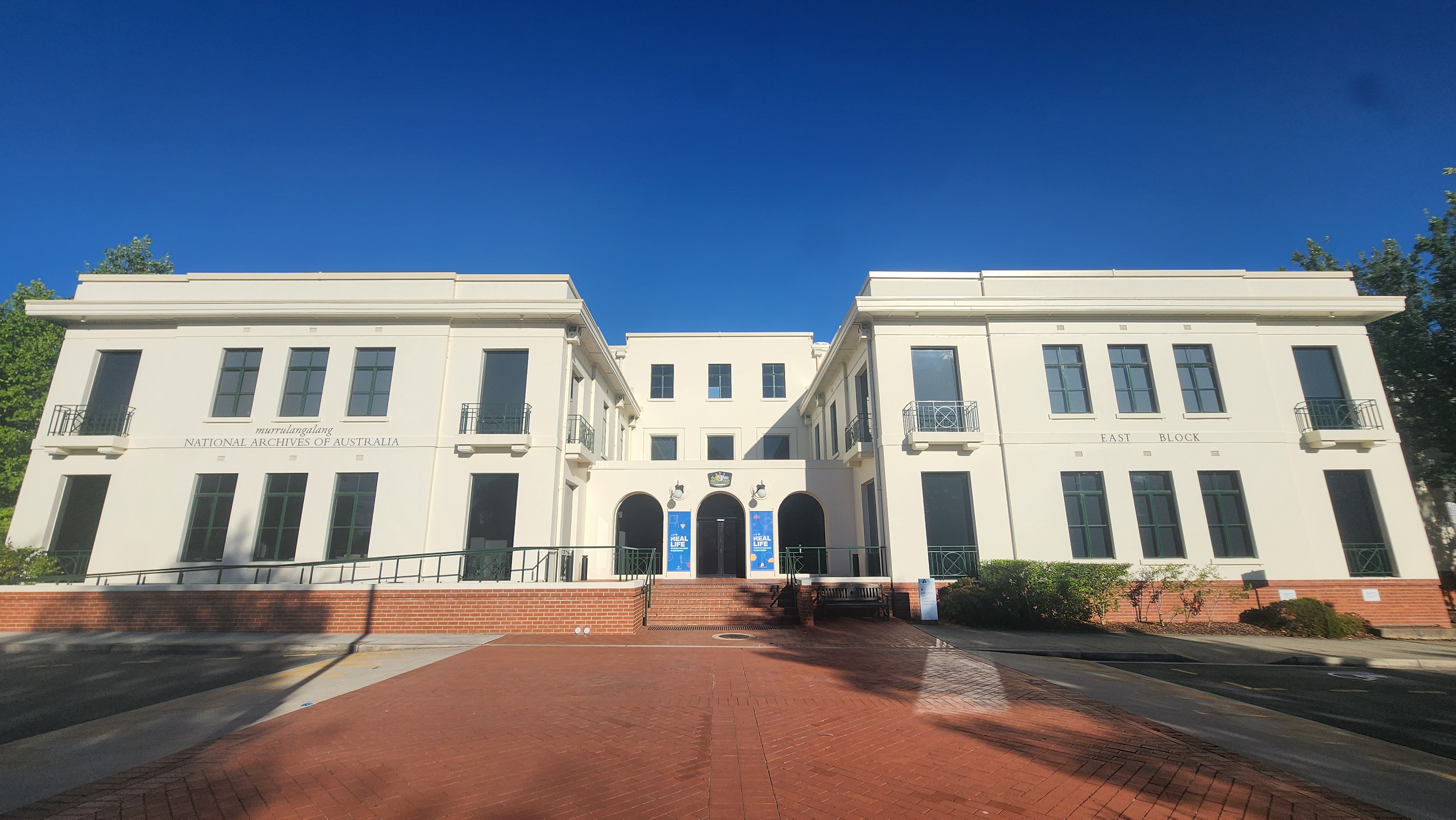

Agency overview
- Formed: March 1961
- Preceding agencies: Commonwealth Archives Office (part of the NLA); Australian Archives
- Jurisdiction: Government of Australia
- Headquarters: Kings Avenue, Parkes, ACT; 35°18′18″S 149°07′50″E
- Employees: 404 (2017–18)
- Annual budget: A$82.733 million (2018–19)
- Minister responsible: Tony Burke (2024), Minister for the Arts
- Agency executive: Simon Froude (2024), Director-General
- Key document: Archives Act 1983 (Cth)
- Website: naa.gov.au

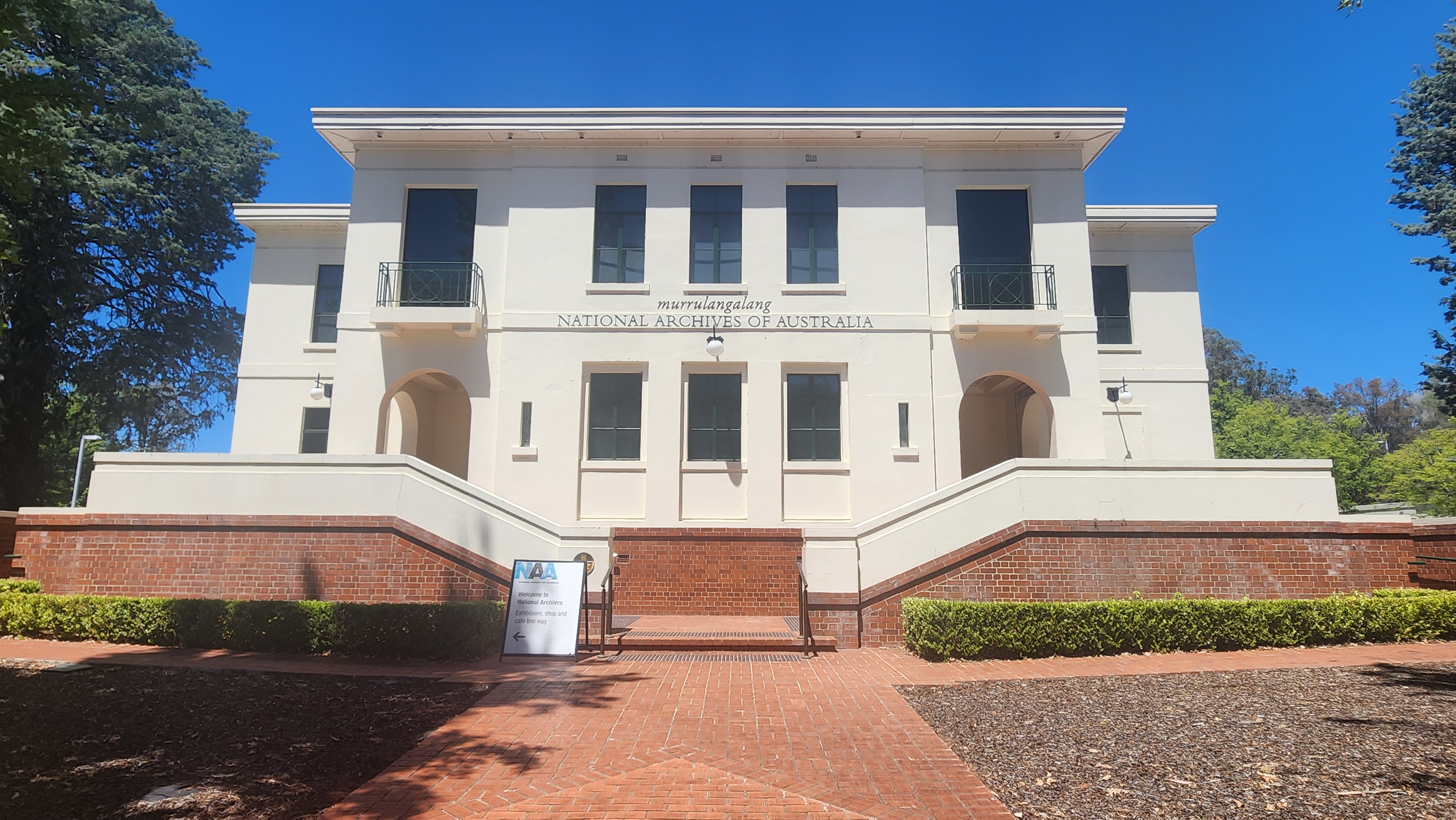
The National Archives of Australia national office on Queen Victoria Terrace in Canberra.

The National Archives of Australia (NAA), formerly known as the Commonwealth Archives Office and Australian Archives, is an Australian Government agency that is the official repository for all federal government documents. It collects, preserves and provides public access to these documents, as well as other archival material related to Australia that the Archives judge ought to be preserved.

Established under and governed by the Archives Act 1983, the body also has a role in promoting good information management by government agencies. The NAA also develops exhibitions, publishes books and guides to the collection, and delivers educational programs.

== History ==
After World War I the Commonwealth National Library (later National Library of Australia) was responsible for collecting Australian Government records. The library appointed its first archives officer in 1944.

In March 1961, the Commonwealth Archives Office formally separated from the National Library of Australia and was renamed as the Australian Archives in 1975.

In 1966, Peter Scott of the Commonwealth Archives Office developed the Australian Series System (aka Commonwealth Records Series System). This system represented a change in traditional archival theories of provenance, and it caters for changes of name and provides a flexible framework to arrange records across the different agencies which share the same organisational content.

The Archives Act 1983 gave legislative protection to Commonwealth government records for the first time, with the Australian Archives responsible for their preservation.

The agency was renamed the National Archives of Australia in February 1998.

In January 2020, the "Report of the Functional and Efficiency Review of the National Archives of Australia" (the "Tune review") was submitted to the government. It was published by the Attorney-General's Department in March 2021. The review, headed by former senior public servant David Tune, had looked at the workings of the NAA, which had been criticised for taking a long time to deliver information. The NAA's lengthy delivery times had been due largely due to its having to wait for advice from other agencies, in particular in respect of sensitive records and those related to national security, before it was able to decide whether to declassify records and release them. Another issue was the deterioration of many records in storage, leading to potential breaches of Part 5 Section 24 of the Public Governance, Performance and Accountability Act 2013. Among other recommendations, the report suggested spending A$67.7 million on digitising material most at risk, over a seven-year period.

The government responded to the review on 20 August 2021, agreeing to fund the digitisation of at-risk records, and to amendments to the Archives Act 1983 (in consultation with the NAA and relevant departments and agencies), but saying that it would not, at that point in time, implement the proposed Government Information Management Model, in which all government records management would be centralised into the NAA.

== Function ==
Under the Act, the National Archives has two main roles:

- to collect and preserve Australia's most valuable government records and encourage their use by the public
- to promote good information management by Commonwealth government agencies, especially in meeting the challenges of the digital age.

== Facilities ==
The Archives' National Office is in Canberra.

In 1998 the Canberra reading room, galleries and public areas of National Archives moved into a heritage-listed building known as "East Block" in the Parliamentary Triangle. The building, one of the national capital's original offices, was built in 1926 beside the Provisional Parliament House. Over the years East Block housed various government departments and served as Canberra's first post office and telephone exchange.

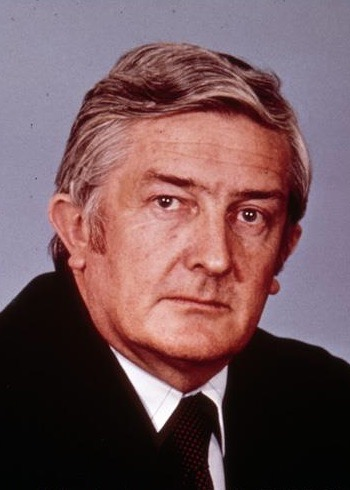
Peter Durack in 1975.

On Friday, 9 June 2017 (International Archives Day), the National Archives of Australia officially opened the new, purpose-built National Archives Preservation Facility in Canberra, separate from the National Office which houses the reading room and galleries. The building is 17,000 m^{2} (180,000 sq ft), and added storage for more than 100 km (62 mi) of paper and audio-visual records. On 21 September 2018, the National Archives Preservation Facility was officially renamed the Peter Durack Building after the Hon Peter Durack QC, who introduced the bill creating Australia's National Archives in 1983.

In addition to the National Office of Canberra in the Australian Capital Territory (ACT), the National Archives has offices and reading rooms in the capital city of each state and the Northern Territory:

- South Australia - Adelaide
- Queensland - Brisbane
- Northern Territory - Darwin
- Tasmania - Hobart
- Victoria - Melbourne
- Western Australia - Perth
- New South Wales - Sydney

== Collections ==
The National Archives of Australia's collection of 45 million items covers records pertaining to the government of Australia, including Federation, Governors-General, Prime Ministers, Cabinet and Ministers since 1901.

Although part of the collection is not open to the public for consultation, the Archives Act 1983 establishes a right of public access to the 'open records' of the Commonwealth administration, i.e. records that are 20 years old or more. The Act also allows certain categories of researchers special access to Commonwealth records that are not available to the public.

Cabinet notebooks have a longer closed period, gradually decreasing from 50 to 30 years by 2021. Access to items of cultural sensitivity to Indigenous Australians may also be restricted.

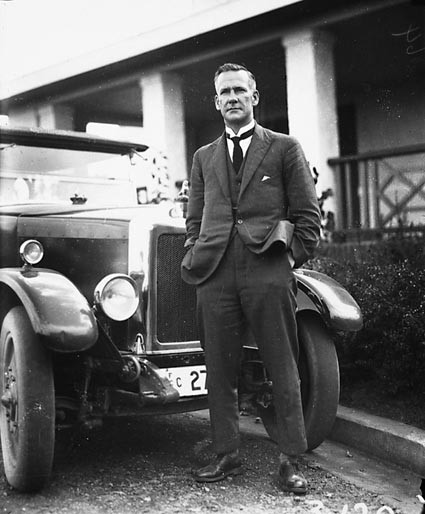
William James (Jack) Mildenhall photographed in 1927

There are several notable collections held by the National Archives of Australia, including:

- Founding documents, including the Royal Commission of Assent, the Constitution Act and other records created when the six colonies federated to create the Commonwealth of Australia on 1 January 1901
- World War I and World War II service records. Some 1.5 million service records for men and women who served in World War I have been digitised and are available online at the Record Search website.
- The Griffin drawings – Walter Burley Griffin and Marion Mahony Griffin's winning entry for the design of Australia's federal capital
- Mildenhall glass plate photographs taken by government photographer Jack Mildenhall – the 7700 images record Canberra during the 1920s and 1930s
- More than 22,000 immigration photographs taken between 1946 and 1999
- Copyright, patent and trademark registration records

== Recent modernisation efforts and collaborations ==
=== "Discovering Anzacs" digital partnership ===
In 2014, the National Archives of Australia, in partnership with Archives New Zealand, created the digital repository Discovering Anzacs to commemorate the centenary of World War I and each nation's role in the war effort at home and abroad. The repository features the complete and fully digitised service records of the Australian and New Zealand Army Corps (ANZAC). Service records are also displayed geographically on a map of the world to indicate each individual's place of birth, enlistment, death and burial. Users are encouraged to transcribe the official records to improve access and add personal comments, photos and stories to give greater context to each record.

=== Diversity initiatives ===
In 2014, the National Archives of Australia announced its Reconciliation Action Plan (RAP) to foster better relations with its Indigenous population, the Aboriginal and Torres Strait Islander peoples. The RAP is a multifaceted approach to drawing attention to the history of Aboriginal and Torres Strait Islander peoples, engaging and illustrating their culture respectfully, and providing improved access to their historical records. A main feature of this initiative is the Bringing Them Home name index, which leverages the National Archives' collection of records to facilitate genealogical research for Aboriginal and Torres Strait Islander peoples. The National Archives also seeks to have 3 percent of their workforce as Indigenous.

=== Digital initiatives ===
==== Digital Continuity 2020 ====
On 27 October 2015, the National Archives of Australia announced its Digital Continuity 2020 program to modernise the information management practices of the government for the digital age. The policies of Digital Continuity 2020 issued by the authority of the National Archives apply to the whole of the Australian Government and seek to improve efficiency and access of all services.

==== Deadline 2025 ====
"Deadline 2025" is a collaboration between the National Archives of Australia and the National Film and Sound Archive to prioritise digitisation of valuable audio-visual media stored on magnetic tape which may deteriorate to the point of being unusable by 2025.

In March 2021, a review of the National Archives commissioned by the government found that only six per cent of the collection would be able to be digitised by 2025 with the current resource levels, and recommended that the government spend A$67.7 million on a program to digitise the content most at risk of deterioration within the following seven years. The footage includes recordings from the Royal Commission into Aboriginal Deaths in Custody, ASIO surveillance, film taken on early Australian Antarctic research expeditions, recordings of John Curtin's war-time speeches, and tapes of the Stolen Generation inquiry. The NAA started a fundraising campaign after the government initially failed to commit to funding the project, but in June 2021 announced that the full amount would be provided, in order to digitise the at-risk collection by hiring additional archivists and enhancing its cybersecurity. The pledge of the full amount allows for a faster schedule to digitise the at-risk material, with a completion date of four years away rather than seven.

== Governance ==
As ruled in the Archives Act 1983, the National Archives reports to its minister, the attorney-general. Like all government agencies, it is accountable to the Australian Parliament. The National Archives of Australia Advisory Council provides advice to the minister responsible for the archives and the director-general.

=== National directors ===
- 1944–68 – Ian MacLean, chief archivist
- 1968–70 – Keith Penny, chief archivist
- 1970–71 – Keith Pearson, director, Commonwealth Archives Office
- 1971–75 – John Dunner, director, Commonwealth Archives Office
- 1975–84 – Robert Neale, director-general, Australian Archives
- 1984–89 – Brian Cox, director-general, Australian Archives
- 1990–2000 – George Nichols, director-general, Australian Archives/National Archives of Australia
- 2000–03 – Anne-Marie Schwirtlich, acting director-general, National Archives of Australia
- 2003–11 – Ross Gibbs, director-general, National Archives of Australia
- 2011–Jan 2012 – Stephen Ellis, acting director-general, National Archives of Australia
- 2012–2021 – David Fricker, director-general, National Archives of Australia
- 2022–present – Simon Froude, director-general, National Archives of Australia

=== Council ===
==== 2020–2021 ====
- Dr Denver Beanland (Chair)
- Jade Balfour
- Anne Henderson
- Professor John Williams
- Dr Phil Robertson
- Dr Rosemary Laing
- Suzanne Hampel
- Professor (Emeritus) Sally Walker
- Kevin Andrews MP
- Senator Kim Carr

== See also ==
- List of national archives
- Palace letters
- Xena (software)
