= Computhink =

Provider of document and content management systems

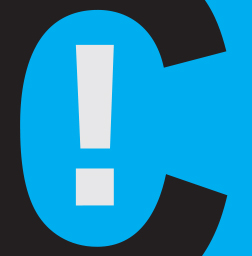
- Computhink logo
- Type: Private
- Industry: Software; Enterprise content management; Document management
- Founded: 1994
- Headquarters: Lombard, Illinois, United States
- Products: Contentverse; Contentverse Cloud
- Number of employees: 50+
- Website: computhink.com

Computhink is a global provider of enterprise content management, document management systems (DMS), records management, and document workflow software. It is best known for developing Contentverse and its cloud variant, Contentverse Cloud.

Computhink's headquarters are located in Lombard, Illinois, United States.

== History ==
Computhink was founded in 1994 in the Chicago area, initially focusing on identity management and imaging software. Early products included “The Paperless Office,” a document imaging and management system.

Over time, Computhink released a product named ViewWise, which was later rebranded and evolved into Contentverse, adding enhanced workflow, cloud, and enterprise content management capabilities.

== Products ==
Computhink develops enterprise content management and document management software solutions designed for organizations across multiple industries. Its core offerings include Contentverse and Contentverse Cloud.

=== Contentverse ===
Contentverse Logo

Contentverse is Computhink's flagship enterprise content management and document management system (DMS). Originally launched as ViewWise in the early 2000s and rebranded in 2013, Contentverse has since evolved into a comprehensive platform.

Key features include:

- Document capture, storage, and version control
- Workflow automation and routing
- Role-based access controls and audit trails
- Optical character recognition and metadata-based search
- Digital signature integration and compliance support
- Cloud and on-premises deployment options

Industry reviewers have noted Contentverse's role in helping organizations reduce paper use and streamline compliance processes, particularly in regulated sectors such as healthcare, government, and finance.

=== Contentverse Cloud ===
Contentverse Cloud is the hosted version of Contentverse, offering the same enterprise content management and workflow features in a cloud-based environment. It is designed for scalability, remote access, and simplified IT management.

=== Other solutions ===
In addition to Contentverse, Computhink has introduced complementary tools and services for intelligent document capture, workflow customization, and industry-specific compliance solutions. Some of these offerings have been positioned under evolving product names such as Captureverse.

== Industries served ==
Computhink's solutions are applied in sectors including government, healthcare, education, finance, legal, and manufacturing. A published case study highlights how Contentverse was adopted by a legal practice to reduce reliance on paper, improve document tracking, and strengthen compliance controls.

== Third-party coverage and recognition ==
- A 2021 article from NCN News Network discusses how Contentverse helps organizations go digital and paperless.
- The product review site SoftwareConnect describes Contentverse's features including access controls, AI, and document workflows.

== See also ==
- Document management system
- Enterprise content management
