= Thomson Reuters Messenger =

Professional Instant messaging client

- Developer(s): Thomson Reuters
- Initial release: Nov 2002
- Stable release: 8.4 / March 2011
- Operating system: Windows
- Type: professional Instant messaging client
- License: Proprietary
- Website: https://thomsonreuterseikon.com/features/collaboration-tools/

Thomson Reuters Messenger (formerly Reuters Messaging) is an instant messaging tool and real-time collaboration service commonly used by financial professionals. It was initially released by Reuters in November 2002. On April 17, 2008, Thomson Reuters purchased Reuters Group and acquired this service. The most recent version of it is Thomson Reuters Messenger 8.4, which was released on March 31, 2011.

== About ==
Thomson Reuters Messenger is intended for the sharing of information among financial professionals. Thomson Reuters Messenger is available as a stand-alone product or as an embedded component in other Thomson Reuters products. The Messenger community provides direct access to over 140,000 professionals from the world's top financial institutions.

Thomson Reuters Messenger Compliance is an add-on risk management and regulatory compliance service. Messenger Compliance logs all content shared and received through Messenger including group chat, attachments, forms, and screenshots. Archives are accessible (for extended archiving and eDiscovery) for a period of up to seven years. Thomson Reuters Messenger Compliance is powered by Global Relay technology.

Messenger allows users to communicate with individuals on various consumer and enterprise IM networks. Consumer connectivity includes AOL Instant Messenger, Yahoo! Messenger, and MSN Messenger. Reuters Messaging Interchange provides enterprise IM connectivity to those on Microsoft Office Communications Server (OCS), IBM Lotus Sametime, and Cisco Jabber XCP.

== Features ==
Messenger 8.4 offers the following features:

- A dynamic directory of financial professionals with easy-to-use advanced search capabilities.
- Improved efficiency using a “dashboard view” that shows email, instant messages, and chat room activity all in one place.
- Communication that is more secure than email. All messages are encrypted with 128-bit encryption before transmission.
- Topic-based chat rooms that make it easy to discuss trade details and strategies with industry experts.
- Enhanced productivity with the exchange of files, screenshots, and financial data within the flow of your conversations.

== Versions ==
The official versions of Thomson Reuters Messenger are as follows:

- RM 3.1, released in November 2002 (for Windows NT4/2000/XP)
- RM 4.0, released in September 2004 (for Windows 2000/XP)
- RM 5.0, released in December 2005 (for Windows 2000/XP)
- RM 6.0, released in December 2006 (for Windows XP)
- RM 7.0, released in December 2007 (for Windows XP/Vista)
- RM 7.0 SP1, released in August 2008 (for Windows XP/Vista)
- RM 8.0, released in December 2008 (for Windows XP/Vista)
- RM 8.0 SP1, released in August 2009 (for Windows XP/Vista)
- Messenger 8.3, released in July 2010 (for Windows XP/Vista/Windows 7)
- Thomson Reuters Messenger for Windows, released in January 2011 (for Windows XP/Vista/Windows 7)
- Messenger 8.4, released in March 2011 (for Windows XP/Vista/Windows 7)

The following versions of Thomson Reuters Messenger are no longer available for use:

- RM 3.1
- RM 4.0
- RM 5.0
- RM 6.0
