= Jatheon Technologies =

Canadian software company

Jatheon Technologies, Inc.
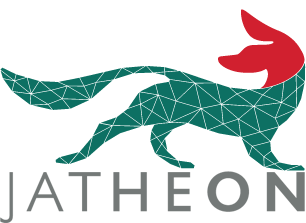
- Type: Private
- Industry: Information management, Enterprise software, Email archiving, Information governance, Regulatory compliance
- Founded: 2004
- Headquarters: 18 King Street East, Suite 1400, Toronto, Ontario, Canada
- Area served: North America, Europe, Asia-Pacific
- Key people: Marko Dinic (CEO)
- Products: Email archiving; eDiscovery; Information governance; Data retention
- Services: Data archiving, Data retention, Backup, Data migration
- Website: jatheon.com

Jatheon Technologies, Inc. is a Canadian data archiving and information governance software company. Founded in 2004 and headquartered in Toronto, Ontario, Jatheon provides software for capturing and managing electronic communications and digital records to support eDiscovery, regulatory compliance, and data governance.

== History ==
Jatheon Technologies was founded in Toronto by Marko Dinic in 2004.

In 2006, the company was included in Deloitte's list of "Top 10 Companies to Watch". In 2009, Jatheon announced a partnership with Dell, introducing solutions that combined PowerEdge servers and Dell PowerVault storage systems with its email archiving software.

In June 2009, Jatheon acquired the ongoing operations and support services of NorthSeas AMT customers. In 2010, the company acquired Trend Micro's operations.

In 2017, it introduced functionality for archiving social media and mobile communications and later launched a cloud-based platform in addition to its on-premises deployments.

It was listed in Gartner's Magic Quadrant for Enterprise Information Archiving in 2022. In 2024, the company reported compliance with standards including GDPR, ISO 27001, SOC 2 Type II, and HIPAA. The Radicati Group described Jatheon as a "Trail Blazer" in its 2024 Market Quadrant for Information Archiving and as a "Top Player" in its 2025 edition.

In 2024, Jatheon added support for archiving Zoom meetings and joined the Amazon Web Services (AWS) Partner Network. In 2025, the company introduced additional features incorporating machine learning techniques into data analysis and compliance-related functions.
