= Central Taiwan Innovation Campus =

Research center in Nantou City, Nantou County, Taiwan

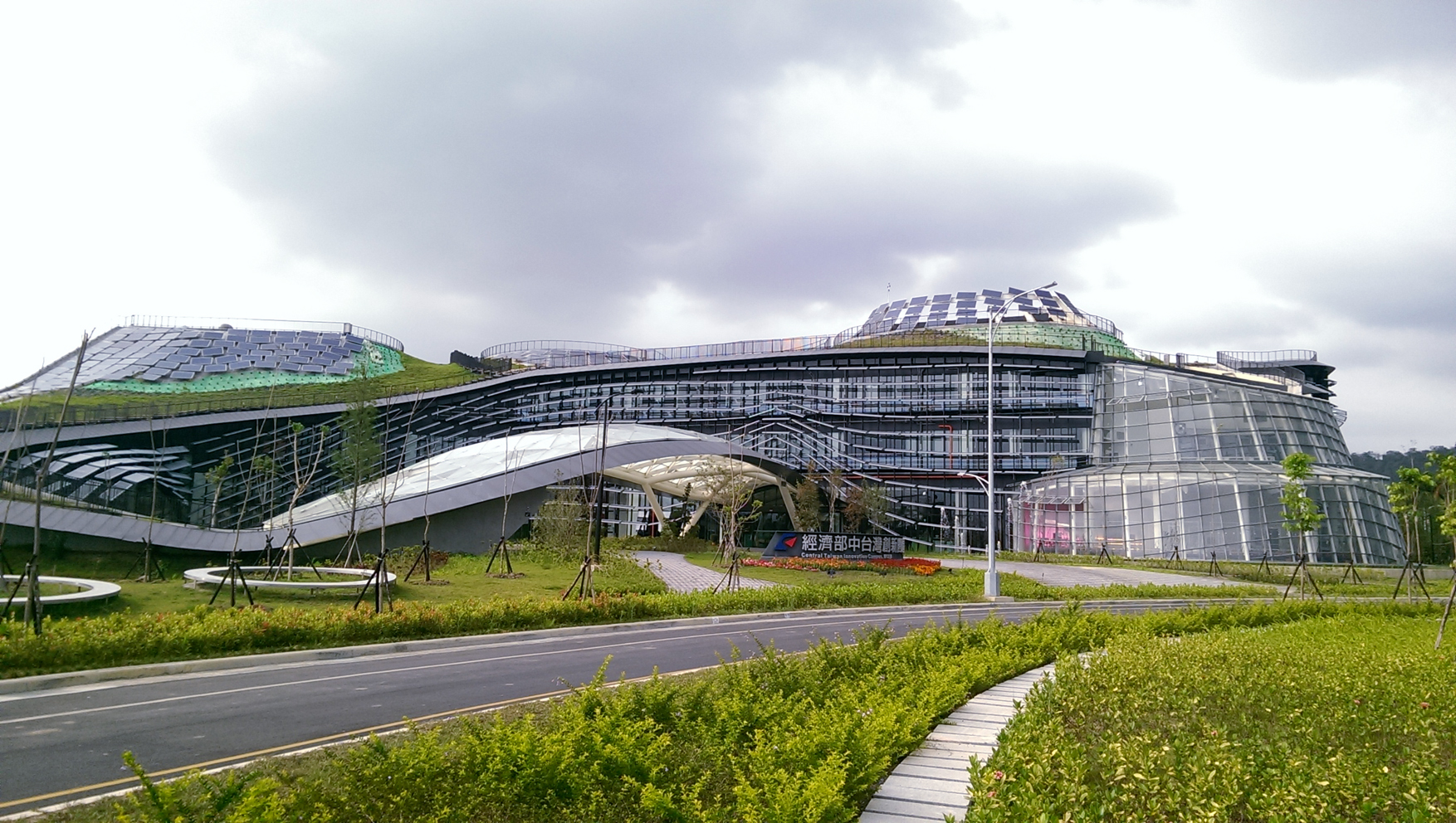
- Other name: 中臺灣創新園區
- Established: 15 September 2014
- Location: Nantou City, Nantou County, Taiwan
- Coordinates: 23°56′13.7″N 120°41′52.6″E
- Interactive map of Central Taiwan Innovation Campus
- Website: Official website (in Chinese)

The Central Taiwan Innovation Campus (traditional Chinese: 中臺灣創新園區; simplified Chinese: 中台湾创新园区; pinyin: Zhōng Táiwān Chuàngxīn Yuánqū) is a research center in Zhongxing New Village, Nantou City, Nantou County, Taiwan.

== History ==
In April 2010, Bio Architecture Formosana and Noiz joined the design competition of the building and won first prize. During the development stage, the site for the building was relocated once. The construction of the building was completed and opened on 15 September 2014. In August 2017, the building received the Diamond Class Green Building and Intelligent Building rating by the Ministry of the Interior based on several indicators.

== Architecture ==
The building total surface covers an area of 42,700 m^{2} on a 2.47 hectares of land. The building was constructed entirely by metal-framed curtain wall. The shape of the building resembles a sliced open of a ground layer. It also features a greenhouse at its southern-east side. The building is covered by 3,358 sunshade panels and 140kW photovoltaic system.

== See also ==
- Education in Taiwan
- Industrial Technology Research Institute
