= British Columbia Technology Industry Association =

Not-for-profit trade association

BC Tech Association
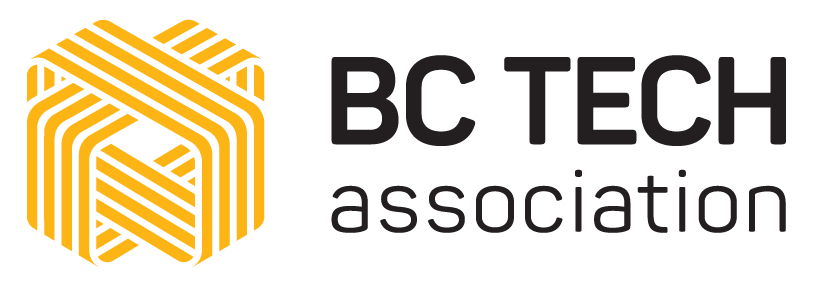
- Founded: 1993; 33 years ago
- Headquarters: Vancouver, British Columbia
- Location: Canada
- Key people: Laurie Schultz, Board Chair
- Website: wearebctech.com

The BC Tech Association (BC Tech), formally the British Columbia Technology Industry Association (BCTIA), is a not-for-profit member-funded trade association in British Columbia, Canada, which promotes the technology industry in the province. The technology industry in BC has been growing steadily since the late 1990s and constituted 5.9% of British Columbia's economic output in 2007.

BC Tech has a membership base of over 2,100 companies ranging from start-ups to established organizations, and spanning a variety of technology-related sectors including education, hardware, software, life sciences, manufacturing, natural resources, web technology and green energy. BC Tech facilitates partnerships and programs within the BC technology industry, as well as advocating on behalf of association members and the industry as a whole.

== History ==
BC Tech was incorporated in 1993 with the amalgamation of the Electronic Manufacturers' Association of British Columbia (EMABC) and the Information Technology Association of Canada, BC Chapter (ITAC-BC). Over the years, BC Tech has provided opportunities for professional development, delivered industry-focused events and programs, and exerted political influence on the industry's behalf, as well as working with the BC government and BC universities to double the number of students graduating in the fields of computing sciences and computer and electrical engineering.

Over the years, BC Tech has led a number of initiatives designed to support the growth of BC's technology industry. In 2004, it launched the Integrated Technology Initiative (ITI), a coalition of BC science and technology stakeholders led by BC Tech that was involved in analyzing and consolidating existing research to develop a competitive strategy for BC's science and technology industry. In 2006, BC Tech partnered with the not-for-profit British Columbia Regional Science & Technology Network (BCRSTN) to facilitate collaboration, innovation, and commercialization of research.

In June 2007, BC Tech joined forces with the Power Technology Alliance to support the growth of the clean technology industry in British Columbia, which comprises more than 200 companies working to develop clean, green energy and renewable energy sources and services. To this end, BC Tech has established a Clean Energy Technology Program and a Clean Tech Industry Advisory Group to ensure that these companies have the capital, human resources, and access to markets they need to grow and prosper.

Jill Tipping replaced Bill Tam as President and CEO of BC Tech in November 2017. Bill Tam was President and CEO from 2011 to 2017. Former Presidents and CEOs include Dr. Pascal Spothelfer and Rob Cruickshank.

== Activities ==
BC Tech has been working with BC's Ministry of Advanced Education and Labour Market Development to create a technology action plan for British Columbia. In addition, BC Tech hosts a number of regular events, including CTO Roundtables, Technology Forums, Software-as-aService (SaaS) Bootcamps, and the annual Technology Impact Awards (TIAs), as well as working to develop and recruit talent through its TechTalent BC initiatives

=== Technology Impact Awards ===
The annual BC Technology Impact Awards were founded by BC Tech in 1994. There are three categories of TIA awards: Technology Awards, Company Awards, and Personal Recognition Awards. To participate in the TIAs, a technology company must have its head office based in British Columbia or have established a significant operating division complete with senior management in the province. TIAs winners benefit through media recognition and the opportunity to connect with potential investors, advisors, mentors, and partners. TIAs winners in recent years have included AbeBooks, Strangeloop Networks, Business Objects, and EQO Communications.

=== TechTalentBC ===
BC Tech takes an active role in developing local talent and recruiting skilled technology workers through a number of initiatives, including awarding scholarships to BC students who plan to make their careers in science and technology, and offering foreign recruitment workshops and other programs to help fill the 10,000 BC job openings in technology and related fields projected for 2008 alone.

BC Tech also conducts various industry studies to generate a greater understanding of BC's technology industry. These studies enable industry organizations to offer more targeted industry development campaigns and strategic corporate growth programs. One such study, the 2007 TechTalentBC Labour Demand survey, was undertaken with the assistance of the Information and Communications Technology Council. This study sought information regarding difficulties companies have in attracting top talent and the strategies they use to increase their headcounts.

== Members ==
High-profile members of BC Tech include companies such as Sierra Wireless, MacDonald Dettwiler and Associates, PMC-Sierra, Bell Mobility, Electronic Arts (Canada) Inc., IBM Canada, Maximizer Software, the Microsoft Canada Development Centre, Nokia, Sony Canada, Sun Microsystems, Telus, and Ballard Power Systems.

BC Tech members also include research and development organizations such as the National Research Council (Canada), government organizations such as the BC Innovation Council and Industry Canada, non-profit educational centres such as TELUS World of Science (formerly Science World), worldwide technology organizations such as the Society for Technical Communication, and professional services firms that serve the technology industry such as PricewaterhouseCoopers.

In addition, BC Tech membership includes universities and university offices such as the British Columbia Institute of Technology, the University of British Columbia University-Industry Liaison Office, Douglas College, and the Emily Carr Institute of Art and Design.
