= SEC Rule 17a-4 =

American financial regulation

SEC Rule 17a-4 is a regulation issued by the U.S. Securities and Exchange Commission pursuant to its regulatory authority under the US Securities Exchange Act of 1934 (Known simply as the "Exchange Act") which outlines requirements for data retention, indexing, and accessibility for companies which deal in the trade or brokering of financial securities such as stocks, bonds, and futures. According to the rule, records of numerous types of transactions must be retained and indexed on indelible media with immediate accessibility for a period of two years, and with non-immediate access for a period of at least six years. Duplicate records must also be kept within the same time frame at an off-site location.
