= Fundación CTIC =

Spanish research organisation

- Established: 2004
- President: Roberto Paraja
- CEO: Pablo Coca
- Address: C/ Ada Byron, 39 Edificio Centros Tecnológicos, 33203 Gijón
- Location: Gijón y Peón (Villaviciosa), Asturias, Spain
- Coordinates: 43.521298°N 5.610023°W
- Interactive map of Fundación CTIC
- Website: www.fundacionctic.org

CTIC (Technological Center for Information and Communication) is a non-profit private foundation focused on promoting development in the field of information and communications technology (ICT) in Asturias, Spain. It is made up of ICT firms and the Government of the Principality of Asturias. CTIC has also hosted the Spanish office of the World Wide Web Consortium (W3C) since 2003, acting as the W3C Chapter for Spain and the Latin-American Spanish-speaking regions. This role involves promoting W3C standards among developers and organizations, as well as participating in the research and definition of web standards through various working groups.

== Purpose ==
According to its statutes, CTIC's founding purposes are:

- contribution to the general benefit of society and the improvement of the competitiveness of companies through the generation of ICT knowledge
- carrying out and developing the application of R&D&I (research and development and innovation) activities
- promotion and development of the information society in general and of information and communication technologies

Since 2003, CTIC has also hosted the Spanish office of the World Wide Web Consortium (W3C), whose main mission is to promote the adoption of the W3C web standards among developers, application creators and others in the web community.

== CTIC Technology Centre ==
CTIC is registered as a technology centre in the Register of Technology Centres and Technological Innovation Support Centres according to the Resolution of the Ministry of Science and Innovation of 23 November 2011 with the number 94 in accordance with Royal Decree 2093/2008, of 10 December, and is part of the Network of Technology Centres of the Principality of Asturias.

The CTIC Technology Centre aims to improve the competitiveness of companies through research and technological innovation, as well as the design and implementation of strategies, initiatives or projects of Technological Development. It focuses mainly on the development of strategic plans, intervention models and feasibility studies of policies related to the Information Society in its advanced stages. It also provides technological support services aimed at the standardisation and standardised incorporation of ICTs in companies and the promotion of an innovative culture among SMEs in traditional sectors.

== Activities in Asturias ==
=== CTIC RuralTech ===
CTIC RuralTech is a project based in a CTIC centre in Peón (Pion), Asturias. Its projects in Arroes, Peón and the Candanal Valley are based on the concept of Territorial Intelligence, a multidisciplinary sustainability strategy based on the need for community knowledge access and management to gain systemic understanding of a territory such as Asturias.

It develops technology for the rural environment, for example in improving energy self-consumption, fire alerts, traceability of agri-food products. The aim is to create a model of village adapted to the needs of the 21st century: sustainable, connected, and offering a good quality of life to its inhabitants, but without losing the essence of the rural environment.

=== Digital transformation and data-driven organisations ===
CTIC works in this field with two objectives: on the one hand, to help companies and entities in their digital transformation processes to become data-driven organisations, known as data-driven companies. And on the other hand, applying its knowledge and experience in interoperability, advanced architectures and digital identification standards, verifiable credentials and linked data, as well as the development of data spaces, the cornerstone of the deployment of the European Data Strategy. It provides data solutions, including: frameworks for data generation and acquisition. Advanced architectures for processing and analysis, including the use of AI algorithms; and methods for visualisation and communication.

It also adopts a long-term outlook in which it assists with adaptation to technological advances including digital transformation in companies, monitors market trends, and promotes continuous investment in infrastructure and equipment.

== W3C Spain ==
CTIC is the headquarters of W3C in Spain since its creation in 2003. Currently, it is also the office for the Spanish-speaking countries of South America. Its mission is to develop, translate, localise, and promote the adoption of W3C standards on the Spanish-language web.

Its main tasks are to collaborate on standards and disseminate them to its members and the general public, which it does via local discussion forums and events (tutorials, workshops, congresses, courses, presentations, etc.) and publicity (through news, press releases, mailing lists, etc.) and to assist in their implementation (for example via technical meetings with member companies).

== See also ==
- ONTORULE
