= Information and Communications Technology Council =

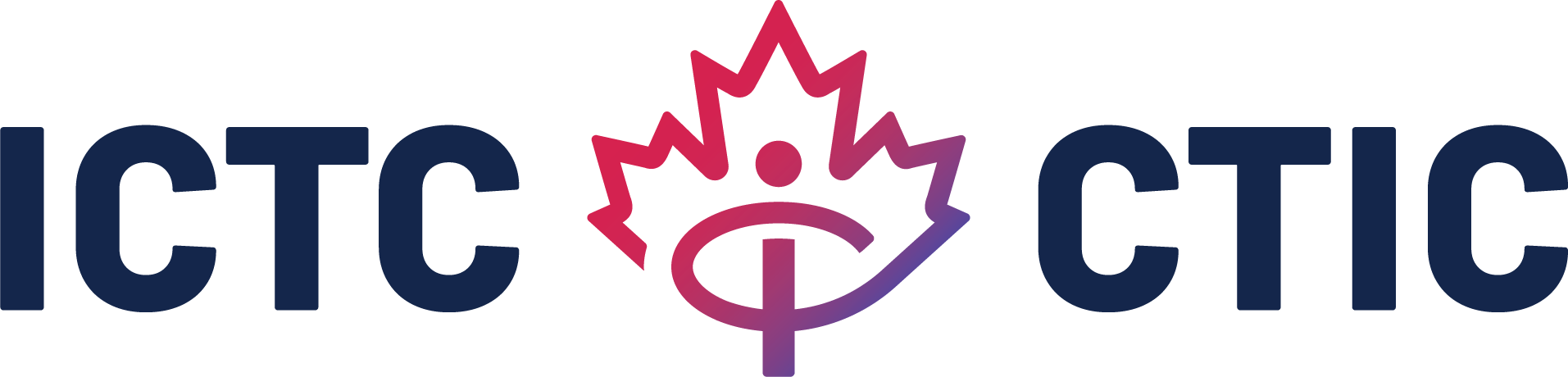
- Type: Not for profit
- Industry: Information and Communications Technology
- Founded: 1992
- Headquarters: Ottawa, Ontario, Canada
- Key people: Namir Anani (President & CEO), Dr. Thomas P. Keenan (Chair)
- Products: DigitalYouth, CyberTitan, WIL Digital, GoTalent, Research
- Revenue: 5,486,977 euro (2025)
- Number of employees: 100+
- Website: www.ictc-ctic.ca

The Information and Communications Technology Council was founded in 1992 as the Software Human Resources Council one of 31 sector councils funded in part by the Government of Canada's Sector Council Program.

Over the years the Software Human Resources Council evolved, and once the Canadian Government began to stop funding the sector councils, the organization re-branded to become the Information and Communications Technology Council.

The organization adopted its new name in October 2006 to reflect an expanded mandate of strengthening Canada's digital advantage in the global economy. It delivers forward-looking research, practical policy advice, and capacity-building solutions for individuals and businesses. Its goal is to ensure that technology is utilized to drive economic growth and innovation and that Canada's workforce remains competitive on a global scale.

The Information and Communications Technology Council provides:

- emerging technology research
- labour market intelligence and economic analysis
- career awareness, capacity building solutions and professional development
- consumer research
- policy advice

== Board of directors ==
Officers

- Janet Lin - Vice President, Lending and Payments Technology – EQ Bank (Chair)
- Dr. Thomas P. Keenan, FCIPS, I.S.P., ITCP – Professor, School of Architecture, Planning and Landscape, University of Calgary (Vice-Chair)
- Jack Noppé - Strategic Advisor – Connected Canadians (Treasurer)
- Jim Hinton - Founder, Lawyer, IP Strategist, Patent & Trademark Agent (Secretary)

Directors

- Gary Davenport, Past President – CIO Association of Canada
- Jauvonne Kitto, Co-Founder & CEO – Saa Dene Group of Companies
- Soumen Roy, Executive Director & Country Head, Canada - Tata Consultancy Services
- Natiea Vinson, CEO – First Nations Technology Council
